= 2013–14 Eintracht Braunschweig season =

Eintracht Braunschweig
2013–14 season
- Chairman: Sebastian Ebel
- Manager: Torsten Lieberknecht
- Stadium: Eintracht-Stadion, Braunschweig, Lower Saxony
- Bundesliga: 18th (relegated)
- DFB-Pokal: First round
- Top goalscorer: League: Dominick Kumbela (9); All: Dominick Kumbela (9)
- Highest home attendance: 23,325 (vs. Dortmund and B. Munich)
- Lowest home attendance: 21,600 (vs. Hoffenheim)
- Average home league attendance: 22,799
Home colours	Away colours	Third colours

The 2013–14 Eintracht Braunschweig season marks the club's first season in the Bundesliga in 28 years.

== Review and events ==
The draw for the first round of the 2013–14 DFB-Pokal happened on 15 June and paired Braunschweig with 2. Bundesliga team Arminia Bielefeld.

The team finished the 2013–14 Bundesliga season in 18th place and was therefore relegated again after one season in the top-flight. Eintracht Braunschweig had spent most of the season on a relegation spot, but had a chance to stay in the league until the very last matchday. They were officially relegated on 10 May 2014 after a 1–3 loss at 1899 Hoffenheim.

== Matches and results ==
=== Legend ===
Win Tie Loss

=== Friendly matches ===
29 June 2013	VfB Haßloch	0–14	Eintracht Braunschweig	Haßloch
13:00		Report	Kruppke 20', 26'; Hochscheidt 22'; Vrančić 23', 43'; G. Korte 33'; Kluft 52', 55', 66', 76'; Erwig-Drüppel 71'; Doğan 78' (pen.); Oehrl 81'; Boland 83'	Stadium: Sportplatz am Eichelgarten; Attendance: 2,000

6 July 2013	Braunschweiger SC Acosta	0–5	Eintracht Braunschweig	Braunschweig
15:30		Report	Oehrl 12'; Bičakčić 17'; Vrančić 75'; Theuerkauf 81'; Correia 82'	Stadium: Konrad-Koch-Stadion; Attendance: 2,700

7 July 2013	Eintracht Braunschweig	0–0	(Denmark) Aalborg BK	Salzgitter
15:00		Report		Stadium: Stadion am Salzgittersee; Attendance: 3,084

13 July 2013 Nordcup	Hamburger SV	0–0^{(2 x 30 minutes match)} (4–3 p)	Eintracht Braunschweig	Hamburg
16:00		Report; Report		Stadium: Imtech Arena; Attendance: 13,800
	Penalties
	Van der Vaart (penalty scored); Jansen (penalty missed); Sobiech (penalty scored); Badelj (penalty scored); Sala (penalty scored)		(penalty scored) Vrančić; (penalty missed) Doğan; (penalty scored) Caligiuri; (penalty scored) Reichel; (penalty missed) Oehrl

14 July 2013 Nordcup	VfL Wolfsburg	1–2^{(2 x 30 minutes match)}	Eintracht Braunschweig	Hamburg
15:30	Kutschke 51'	Report	Kratz 30'; Jackson 36'; Perthel (yellow card) 55'	Stadium: Imtech Arena; Attendance: 12,000

20 July 2013	Eintracht Braunschweig	0–4	(Spain) Athletic Bilbao	Kufstein, Austria
19:45		Report	Susaeta 19'; Ruiz de Galarreta 27'; Aduriz 47'; De Marcos 75'	Stadium: Kufstein-Arena; Attendance: 600

21 July 2013	Eintracht Braunschweig	1–0	(Turkey) Çaykur Rizespor	Fügen, Austria
18:30	Kruppke 42'	Report		Stadium: Sportplatz Fügen; Attendance: 300

27 July 2013	Eintracht Braunschweig	0–3	(England) West Ham United	Braunschweig
15:30		Report	Maïga 22', 44'; Diamé 42'	Stadium: Eintracht-Stadion; Attendance: 10,800

6 August 2013	Eintracht Braunschweig	2–0	(England) Hull City	Goslar
18:00	Ademi 53'; G. Korte 85'	Report		Stadium: S-Arena; Attendance: 1,500

3 September 2013	MTV Gifhorn	0–10	Eintracht Braunschweig	Gifhorn
18:30		Report	Pfitzner 6'; Vrančić 17'; Henn 34'; Boland 35'; Ademi 37'; Kumbela 48', 61'; Kruppke 82'; Bellarabi 88', 89'	Stadium: GWG-Stadion; Attendance: 850

7 September 2013	1. FC Magdeburg	1–2	Eintracht Braunschweig	Magdeburg
15:30	Hammann 51'	Report	Kumbela 17'; Vrančić 70'	Stadium: MDCC-Arena; Attendance: 3,713

11 October 2013	MTV Isenbüttel	1–7	Eintracht Braunschweig	Isenbüttel
18:00	Glodeck 76'	Report	Kruppke 12', 18', 27'; Mohwinkel 29' (o.g.); Oehrl 44'; G. Korte 56'; Ademi 81'	Stadium: Sportplatz Isenbüttel; Attendance: 400

8 January 2014	Eintracht Braunschweig	1–0	(Netherlands) Heracles Almelo	Algeciras, Spain
16:30	Nielsen 64'	Report; Report		Stadium: Estadio Nuevo Mirador; Attendance: 150

11 January 2014	Eintracht Braunschweig	0–2	SC Freiburg	Chiclana de la Frontera, Spain
16:00		Report; Report	Ginter 23'; Mehmedi 45' (pen.)	Stadium: Estadio Municipal de Atletismo; Attendance: 100

14 January 2014	Eintracht Braunschweig	1–0	(Switzerland) Basel	Algeciras, Spain
16:00	Ademi 39'	Report; Report		Stadium: Estadio Nuevo Mirador; Attendance: 80

19 January 2014 Stadtwerke Düsseldorf Wintercup	Fortuna Düsseldorf	1–1^{(1 x 45 minutes match)} (4–5 p)	Eintracht Braunschweig	Düsseldorf
14:00	Bancé 36'	Report; Report	Kessel 21'; Correia (yellow card) 43'	Stadium: Esprit Arena; Attendance: 19,100
	Penalties
	Benschop (penalty scored); Fink (penalty scored); Lambertz (penalty scored); Bancé (penalty scored); Malezas (penalty missed)		(penalty scored) Reichel; (penalty scored) Bellarabi; (penalty scored) Kessel; (penalty scored) Pfitzner; (penalty scored) Kumbela

19 January 2014 Stadtwerke Düsseldorf Wintercup	Bayer Leverkusen	1–0^{(1 x 45 minutes match)}	Eintracht Braunschweig	Düsseldorf
17:00	Bouhaddouz 33'	Report	Hochscheidt (yellow card) 42'	Stadium: Esprit Arena; Attendance: 19,100

15 May 2014	TSV Flettmar	1–21	Eintracht Braunschweig	Flettmar
18:30	TSV Flettmar 90'	Report	Reichel 6', 33'; Khelifi 7', 32', 86'; Hochscheidt 9', 26', 40'; Boland 15', 27', 45'; Bellarabi 34'; Kratz 43'; Pfitzner 48'; Vrančić 54'; Kruppke 66'; Erwig-Drüppel 68', 84', 87'; Ademi 73', 78'	Stadium: Sportplatz TSV Flettmar; Attendance: 800

=== Bundesliga ===
==== League fixtures and results ====
10 August 2013 1	Eintracht Braunschweig	0–1	Werder Bremen	Braunschweig
18:30	Theuerkauf (yellow card) 77'	Summary	Junuzović 82'	Stadium: Eintracht-Stadion; Attendance: 23,000; Referee: Deniz Aytekin (Oberasbach)

18 August 2013 2	Borussia Dortmund	2–1	Eintracht Braunschweig	Dortmund
17:30	Hofmann 75'; Reus 86' (pen.)	Summary	Theuerkauf (yellow card) 60'; Kratz 89'	Stadium: Signal Iduna Park; Attendance: 80,200; Referee: Peter Sippel (Munich)

25 August 2013 3	Eintracht Braunschweig	0–2	Eintracht Frankfurt	Braunschweig
15:30	Theuerkauf (yellow card) 53'; Kratz (yellow card) 56'	Summary	Meier 52', (yellow card) 74'; Aigner 62'	Stadium: Eintracht-Stadion; Attendance: 22,900; Referee: Wolfgang Stark (Ergolding)

31 August 2013 4	Hamburger SV	4–0	Eintracht Braunschweig	Hamburg
15:30	Van der Vaart 7'; Zoua 17', (yellow card) 87'; Çalhanoğlu 80', 90'	Summary	Bičakčić (yellow card) 33'; Theuerkauf (yellow card) 55'; Bellarabi (yellow card) 60'; Jackson (yellow card) 63'	Stadium: Imtech Arena; Attendance: 54,958; Referee: Knut Kircher (Rottenburg am Neckar)

15 September 2013 5	Eintracht Braunschweig	1–1	1. FC Nürnberg	Braunschweig
17:30	Kessel (yellow card) 50'; Reichel (yellow card) 65'; Elabdellaoui 70'; Kumbela (yellow card) 86'	Summary	Hloušek 28'; Ginczek (yellow card) 69'; Hasebe (yellow card) 74'	Stadium: Eintracht-Stadion; Attendance: 22,570; Referee: Marco Fritz (Korb)

20 September 2013 6	Borussia Mönchengladbach	4–1	Eintracht Braunschweig	Mönchengladbach
20:30	Wendt 22'; Xhaka (yellow card) 24'; Raffael 31', 76'; Kruse 72' (pen.)	Summary	Bellarabi (yellow card) 1'; Boland 58'; Bičakčić (yellow card) 71'	Stadium: Borussia-Park; Attendance: 50,064; Referee: Peter Gagelmann (Bremen)

29 September 2013 7	Eintracht Braunschweig	0–4	VfB Stuttgart	Braunschweig
17:30		Summary	Ibišević 40'; Boka (yellow card) 44'; Maxim 50'; Traoré 76'; Harnik 86'	Stadium: Eintracht-Stadion; Attendance: 22,760; Referee: Felix Brych (Munich)

5 October 2013 8	VfL Wolfsburg	0–2	Eintracht Braunschweig	Wolfsburg
15:30	Olić (yellow card) 60'; Diego (yellow card) 75'	Summary	Bellarabi 30'; Ademi (yellow card) 54'; Theuerkauf (yellow card) 71'; Boland (yellow card) 84'; Kumbela 86'	Stadium: Volkswagen Arena; Attendance: 30,000; Referee: Guido Winkelmann (Kerken)

19 October 2013 9	Eintracht Braunschweig	2–3	Schalke 04	Braunschweig
15:30	Ademi 20'; Bellarabi 59'	Summary	Meyer 29'; Uchida (yellow card) 43'; Goretzka 65'; Neustädter 90'	Stadium: Eintracht-Stadion; Attendance: 23,251; Referee: Robert Hartmann (Krugzell)

26 October 2013 10	Mainz 05	3–0	Eintracht Braunschweig	Mainz
15:30	Okazaki 8', 68'; Müller (yellow card) 41'; Pospěch (yellow card) 90'	Summary; Report	Boland (yellow card) 75'; Theuerkauf (yellow card) 80'; Kruppke (yellow card) 85'	Stadium: Coface Arena; Attendance: 30,657; Referee: Daniel Siebert (Berlin)

2 November 2013 11	Eintracht Braunschweig	1–0	Bayer Leverkusen	Braunschweig
15:30	Doğan (yellow card) 69'; Kumbela 81'; Reichel (yellow card) 84'	Summary	Castro (yellow card) 78'; L. Bender (yellow card) 74' (yellow-red card) 90'; Sam (yellow card) 90'	Stadium: Eintracht-Stadion; Attendance: 22,720; Referee: Peter Sippel (Munich)

8 November 2013 12	Hannover 96	0–0	Eintracht Braunschweig	Hanover
20:30	Andreasen (yellow card) 58'	Summary	Bičakčić (yellow card) 13'	Stadium: HDI-Arena; Attendance: 47,200; Referee: Knut Kircher (Rottenburg am Neckar)

23 November 2013 13	Eintracht Braunschweig	0–1	SC Freiburg	Braunschweig
15:30	Bičakčić (yellow card) 43'; Bellarabi (yellow card) 45'; Boland (yellow card) 90'	Summary	Fernandes 52'; Pilař (yellow card) 64'	Stadium: Eintracht-Stadion; Attendance: 21,810; Referee: Wolfgang Stark (Ergolding)

30 November 2013 14	Bayern Munich	2–0	Eintracht Braunschweig	Munich
15:30	Robben 2', 30'	Summary		Stadium: Allianz Arena; Attendance: 71,000; Referee: Tobias Stieler (Hamburg)

8 December 2013 15	Eintracht Braunschweig	0–2	Hertha BSC	Braunschweig
17:30	Oehrl (yellow card) 45'; Perthel (yellow card) 60' (red card) 81'; Bellarabi (yellow card) 83'	Report; Summary	Ramos 20'; Hosogai (yellow card) 37'; Ndjeng (yellow card) 43'; Schulz (yellow card) 73'; Van den Bergh (yellow card) 78'; Ciğerci 80'	Stadium: Eintracht-Stadion; Attendance: 23,100; Referee: Thorsten Kinhöfer (Herne, North Rhine-Westphalia)

14 December 2013 16	FC Augsburg	4–1	Eintracht Braunschweig	Augsburg
15:30	Verhaegh 23' (pen.); Hahn 30', 33'; Bobadilla (yellow card) 66'; De Jong (yellow card) 72'; Altıntop 75'	Summary	Oehrl 48', (yellow card) 76'; Kratz (yellow card) 54'	Stadium: SGL arena Attendance: 28,010; Referee: Knut Kircher (Rottenburg am Neckar)

21 December 2013 17	Eintracht Braunschweig	1–0	1899 Hoffenheim	Braunschweig
15:30	Oehrl 29' (pen.); Perthel (yellow card) 36' (red card) 82'; Pfitzner (yellow card) 51'	Summary	Schipplock (yellow card) 58'; Herdling (yellow card) 79'	Stadium: Eintracht-Stadion; Attendance: 21,600; Referee: Guido Winkelmann (Kerken)

26 January 2014 18	Werder Bremen	0–0	Eintracht Braunschweig	Bremen
15:30	García (yellow card) 32'; Kroos (yellow card) 35'	Summary	Pfitzner (yellow card) 31'; Theuerkauf (yellow card) 75'	Stadium: Weserstadion; Attendance: 41,040; Referee: Felix Brych (Munich)

31 January 2014 19	Eintracht Braunschweig	1–2	Borussia Dortmund	Braunschweig
20:30	Kessel 54'	Summary	Mkhitaryan (yellow card) 38'; Aubameyang 31', 65'	Stadium: Eintracht-Stadion; Attendance: 23,325; Referee: Marco Fritz (Korb)

8 February 2014 20	Eintracht Frankfurt	3–0	Eintracht Braunschweig	Frankfurt
15:30	Flum 7'; Meier 43'; Aigner 44', (yellow card) 79'; Jung (yellow card) 73'	Summary	Theuerkauf (yellow card) 74'	Stadium: Commerzbank-Arena; Attendance: 40,500; Referee: Markus Schmidt (Stuttgart)

15 February 2014 21	Eintracht Braunschweig	4–2	Hamburger SV	Braunschweig
15:30	Bellarabi (yellow card) 15'; Boland (yellow card) 32'; Theuerkauf (yellow card) 38'; Reichel (yellow card) 45'; Kumbela 51', 61', 85', (yellow card) 65'; Hochscheidt (yellow card) 87', (goal) 90'	Summary	Diekmeier (yellow card) 15'; Lasogga 23'; Rincón (yellow card) 58'; Westermann (yellow card) 60'; Bouy (yellow card) 71'; Iličević 76'; Arslan (yellow card) 79'	Stadium: Eintracht-Stadion; Attendance: 23,200; Referee: Knut Kircher (Rottenburg am Neckar)

22 February 2014 22	1. FC Nürnberg	2–1	Eintracht Braunschweig	Nuremberg
15:30	Angha (yellow card) 23'; Nilsson (red card) 32'; Schäfer (yellow card) 40'; Plattenhardt (yellow card) 42'; Kiyotake 46'; Pekhart 47'	Summary	Kumbela 34'; Reichel (yellow card) 67'; Pfitzner (yellow card) 71'	Stadium: Grundig-Stadion; Attendance: 36,657; Referee: Daniel Siebert (Berlin)

1 March 2014 23	Eintracht Braunschweig	1–1	Borussia Mönchengladbach	Braunschweig
15:30	Boland (yellow card) 42'; Ter Stegen 52' (o.g.)	Summary	Xhaka (yellow card) 16'; Davari 25' (o.g.); Jantschke (yellow card) 54'; Kramer (yellow card) 89'	Stadium: Eintracht-Stadion; Attendance: 23,200; Referee: Günter Perl (Pullach)

8 March 2014 24	VfB Stuttgart	2–2	Eintracht Braunschweig	Stuttgart
15:30	Schwaab (yellow card) 12'; Maxim 30'; Harnik 35'; Traoré (yellow card) 90'	Summary	Hochscheidt 24', (yellow card) 86'; Pfitzner (yellow card) 45'; Bičakčić 82'; Kessel (yellow card) 90'	Stadium: Mercedes-Benz Arena; Attendance: 59,000; Referee: Christian Dingert (Lebecksmühle)

15 March 2014 25	Eintracht Braunschweig	1–1	VfL Wolfsburg	Braunschweig
15:30	Bellarabi 48'; Kumbela (yellow card) 56'	Summary	Luiz Gustavo 36'; Naldo (yellow card) 60'; Ochs (yellow card) 65'; Medojević (yellow card) 75'; Rodríguez (yellow card) 84'	Stadium: Eintracht-Stadion; Attendance: 23,150; Referee: Felix Brych (Munich)

22 March 2014 26	Schalke 04	3–1	Eintracht Braunschweig	Gelsenkirchen
15:30	Goretzka 17'; Kolašinac (yellow card) 38'; Huntelaar 65'; Szalai 90'	Summary	Bellarabi (yellow card) 40'; Kessel 82'; Correia (yellow card) 85'; Theuerkauf (yellow card) 86'	Stadium: Veltins-Arena; Attendance: 61,973; Referee: Wolfgang Stark (Ergolding)

25 March 2014 27	Eintracht Braunschweig	3–1	Mainz 05	Braunschweig
20:00	Kumbela 18', 77', (yellow card) 73'; Boland (yellow card) 39'; Nielsen 45'	Summary	Müller 20'; Okazaki (yellow card) 80'	Stadium: Eintracht-Stadion; Attendance: 21,880; Referee: Robert Hartmann (Krugzell)

29 March 2014 28	Bayer Leverkusen	1–1	Eintracht Braunschweig	Leverkusen
15:30	Can (yellow card) 50'; Kießling 53' (pen.); Guardado (yellow card) 90'	Summary	Reichel 47'; Kratz (yellow card) 73'	Stadium: BayArena; Attendance: 30,210; Referee: Guido Winkelmann (Kerken)

6 April 2014 29	Eintracht Braunschweig	3–0	Hannover 96	Braunschweig
15:30	Kumbela 14'; Nielsen 21'; Elabdellaoui (yellow card) 65'; Boland (yellow card) 78'; Hochscheidt 89'	Summary	Huszti (yellow card) 44'; Hoffmann (red card) 62'; Schulz (yellow card) 73'	Stadium: Eintracht-Stadion; Attendance: 22,867; Referee: Peter Gagelmann (Bremen)

12 April 2014 30	SC Freiburg	2–0	Eintracht Braunschweig	Freiburg im Breisgau
15:30	Vrančić 8' (o.g.); Schuster 48'; Darida (yellow card) 55'; Zulechner (yellow card) 85'	Summary	Kessel (yellow card) 5'; Bičakčić (yellow card) 16'; Hochscheidt (yellow card) 52'; Bellarabi (yellow card) 80'	Stadium: Mage Solar Stadion; Attendance: 24,000; Referee: Tobias Welz (Wiesbaden)

19 April 2014 31	Eintracht Braunschweig	0–2	Bayern Munich	Braunschweig
15:30	Hochscheidt (yellow card) 55'; Henn (yellow card) 77'	Summary	Pizarro 75'; Mandžukić 86'; Schweinsteiger (yellow card) 89'	Stadium: Eintracht-Stadion; Attendance: 23,325; Referee: Daniel Siebert (Berlin)

26 April 2014 32	Hertha BSC	2–0	Eintracht Braunschweig	Berlin
15:30	Brooks 61'; Allagui 77'	Summary		Stadium: Olympiastadion; Attendance: 51,953; Referee: Thorsten Kinhöfer (Herne, North Rhine-Westphalia)

3 May 2014 33	Eintracht Braunschweig	0–1	FC Augsburg	Braunschweig
15:30	Kratz (yellow card) 36'; Kessel (yellow card) 79'	Summary	Kohr (yellow card) 48'; Bobadilla 90', (yellow card) 90'	Stadium: Eintracht-Stadion; Attendance: 22,600; Referee: Christian Dingert (Lebecksmühle)

10 May 2014 34	1899 Hoffenheim	3–1	Eintracht Braunschweig	Sinsheim
15:30	Polanski (yellow card) 3'; Strobl (yellow card) 38'; Rudy 15'; Roberto Firmino 64', (yellow card) 65'; Volland 70'	Summary	Hochscheidt 88'	Stadium: Rhein-Neckar Arena; Attendance: 30,150; Referee: Peter Sippel (Munich)

==== League table ====
Pos	Team	Pld	W	D	L	GF	GA	GD	Pts	Qualification or relegation
14	SC Freiburg	34	9	9	16	43	61	−18	36	
15	VfB Stuttgart	34	8	8	18	49	62	−13	32	
16	Hamburger SV (O)	34	7	6	21	51	75	−24	27	Qualification for the relegation play-offs
17	1. FC Nürnberg (R)	34	5	11	18	37	70	−33	26	Relegation to 2. Bundesliga
18	Eintracht Braunschweig (R)	34	6	7	21	29	60	−31	25	Relegation to 2. Bundesliga

Source: DFB
Rules for classification: 1) points; 2) goal difference; 3) number of goals scored.
(O) Play-off winners; (R) Relegated

=== DFB-Pokal ===
4 August 2013 1st round	Arminia Bielefeld	2–1	Eintracht Braunschweig	Bielefeld
14:30	Hille 36'; Riese (yellow card) 55'; Appiah (yellow card) 62'; Jerat 72' (pen.); Sembolo (yellow card) 90'; Schütz (yellow card) 90'	Summary	Perthel 66'; Doğan (red card) 90'	Stadium: Schüco-Arena; Attendance: 19,091; Referee: Felix Brych (Munich)

== Squad ==
=== Current squad ===
As of 31 January 2014

Squad Season 2013–14
No.	Player	Nat.	Birthday	at BTSV since	previous club	League matches	League goals	Cup matches	Cup goals
Goalkeepers
1	Marjan Petković	German	22 May 1979	2009	FSV Frankfurt	5	0	1	0
26	Daniel Davari	Iranian	6 Jan 1988	2009	Mainz 05 II	29	0	0	0
35	Benjamin Later	German	30 Aug 1986	2013	Youth system	0	0	0	0
Defenders
3	Ermin Bičakčić	Bosnian	24 Jan 1990	01/12	VfB Stuttgart	31	1	1	0
4	Matthias Henn	German	28 Apr 1985	2007	1. FC Kaiserslautern	2	0	0	0
5	Benjamin Kessel	German	1 Oct 1987	2010	Mainz 05 II	20	2	1	0
8	Deniz Doğan	Turk	20 Oct 1979	2007	VfB Lübeck	23	0	1	0
15	Norman Theuerkauf	German	24 Jan 1987	2009	Eintracht Frankfurt II	29	0	0	0
19	Ken Reichel	German	19 Dec 1986	2007	Hamburger SV II	27	1	1	0
21	Jan Washausen	German	2 Oct 1988	2007	Youth system	2	0	0	0
25	Marcel Correia	Portuguese	16 May 1989	2011	1. FC Kaiserslautern II	19	0	0	0
Midfielders
6	Damir Vrančić	Bosnian	4 Oct 1985	2009	Borussia Dortmund II	14	0	0	0
10	Mirko Boland	German	23 Apr 1987	01/09	MSV Duisburg II	33	1	0	0
11	Jan Hochscheidt	German	4 Oct 1987	2013	Erzgebirge Aue	20	4	1	0
14	Omar Elabdellaoui	Norwegian	5 Dec 1991	01/13	Manchester City	29	1	1	0
17	Kevin Kratz	German	21 Jan 1987	2012	Alemannia Aachen	14	1	1	0
22	Salim Khelifi	Swiss	26 Jan 1994	01/14	Lausanne-Sport	1	0	0	0
24	Timo Perthel	German	11 Feb 1989	2013	MSV Duisburg	11	0	1	1
31	Marc Pfitzner	German	28 Aug 1984	2007	Youth system	15	0	0	0
33	Marco Caligiuri	German	14 Apr 1984	2013	Mainz 05	12	0	1	0
38	Karim Bellarabi	German	8 Apr 1990	2013	Bayer Leverkusen	26	3	0	0
Strikers
7	Håvard Nielsen	Norwegian	15 Jul 1993	01/14	Red Bull Salzburg	16	2	0	0
9	Orhan Ademi	Swiss	28 Oct 1991	2012	Rheindorf Altach	25	1	1	0
12	Dominick Kumbela	Congolese	20 Apr 1984	01/10	Rot Weiss Ahlen	30	9	0	0
20	Torsten Oehrl	German	7 Jan 1986	2013	FC Augsburg	11	2	1	0
23	Jonas Erwig-Drüppel	German	20 Jul 1991	2012	Schalke 04 II	0	0	0	0
27	Gianluca Korte	German	29 Aug 1990	2011	TuS Mechtersheim	2	0	0	0
32	Dennis Kruppke (captain)	German	1 Apr 1980	01/08	SC Freiburg	15	0	1	0
No longer at the club
18	Simeon Jackson	Canadian	28 Mar 1987	2013	Norwich City	9	0	1	0
Last updated: 19 May 2014

=== Transfers ===
==== In ====
No.	Pos.	Nat.	Name	Age	EU	Moving from	Type	Transfer window	Ends	Transfer fee	Source
38	MF	(Germany)	Karim Bellarabi	23	EU	Bayer Leverkusen	Loan	Summer	2014	Undisclosed	
33	MF	(Germany)	Marco Caligiuri	29	EU	Mainz 05	Free transfer	Summer	2015	Free	
14	MF	(Norway)	Omar Elabdellaoui	21	EU	Manchester City (England)	Transfer	Summer	2015	Undisclosed	
11	MF	(Germany)	Jan Hochscheidt	25	EU	Erzgebirge Aue	Transfer	Summer	2016	Undisclosed	
18	FW	(Canada) (Jamaica)	Simeon Jackson	26	Non-EU	Norwich City (England)	Free transfer	Summer	2015	Free	
22	MF	(Switzerland) (Tunisia)	Salim Khelifi	20	EU	Lausanne-Sport (Switzerland)	Transfer	Winter	2018	Undisclosed	
35	GK	(Germany)	Benjamin Later	27	EU	Eintracht Braunschweig II	Promoted	Summer	2014	Free	
7	FW	(Norway)	Håvard Nielsen	20	EU	Red Bull Salzburg (Austria)	Loan	Winter	2015	Undisclosed	
20	FW	(Germany)	Torsten Oehrl	27	EU	FC Augsburg	Transfer	Summer	2016	Undisclosed	
24	MF	(Germany)	Timo Perthel	24	EU	MSV Duisburg	Free transfer	Summer	2015	Free	
21	DF	(Germany)	Jan Washausen	24	EU	Kickers Offenbach	Loan return	Summer	2014	N/A	

==== Out ====
No.	Pos.	Nat.	Name	Age	EU	Moving to	Type	Transfer window	Transfer fee	Source
11	MF	(Germany)	Steffen Bohl	29	EU	Free agent	End of contract	Summer	Free	
22	FW	(Canada) (Ghana)	Randy Edwini-Bonsu	23	Non-EU	Free agent	End of contract	Summer	Free	
14	MF	(Norway)	Omar Elabdellaoui	21	EU	Manchester City (England)	End of loan	Summer	N/A	
18	FW	(Canada) (Jamaica)	Simeon Jackson	26	Non-EU	Millwall (England)	Free transfer	Winter	Free	
7	MF	(Germany)	Björn Kluft	23	EU	SV Sandhausen	Loan	Summer	Undisclosed	
13	MF	(Germany)	Raffael Korte	22	EU	1. FC Saarbrücken	Loan	Summer	Undisclosed	
21	FW	(Germany)	Pierre Merkel	24	EU	Hallescher FC	Transfer	Summer	Undisclosed	
18	MF	(Germany)	Oliver Petersch	24	EU	Arminia Bielefeld	End of contract	Summer	Free	
16	DF	(Turkey)	Emre Turan	22	EU	Berliner AK	End of contract	Summer	Free	
20	FW	(China)	Zhang Chengdong	24	Non-EU	Mafra (Portugal)	End of loan	Summer	N/A	

== Management and coaching staff ==
Since 12 May 2008, Torsten Lieberknecht is the manager of Eintracht Braunschweig.

Before the season, former Eintracht Braunschweig player Patrick Bick joined the staff as the club's chief physiotherapist.

Position	Staff
Manager	Torsten Lieberknecht
Assistant manager	Darius Scholtysik
Assistant manager/athletic trainer	Jürgen Rische
Goalkeeping coach	Alexander Kunze
Sporting director	Marc Arnold
Club doctor	Dr. Frank Maier
Chief physiotherapist	Patrick Bick
Physiotherapist	Caroline Schweibs
Physiotherapist	Goce Janevski
Team manager	Holm Stelzer
Kit and equipment manager/Bus driver	Christian Skolik

== Reserve team ==
Eintracht Braunschweig II plays in the fourth-tier Regionalliga Nord for the 2013–14 season.

=== Current squad ===
As of 31 January 2014 Note: Flags indicate national team as defined under FIFA eligibility rules; some limited exceptions apply. Players may hold more than one non-FIFA nationality.

No.	Pos.	Nation	Player
1	GK	GER	Benjamin Later
2	DF	GER	Marcel Schreyer
3	DF	GER	Dennis Slamar
4	DF	GER	Maurice Fiolka
5	DF	GER	Christopher Nachtwey
6	DF	GRE	Giorgos Machlelis
7	MF	AZE	Ilter Tashkin
8	DF	GER	Gino Lago-Bentron
9	MF	GER	Yannick Rolff
10	DF	GER	Pascal Gos
11	FW	GER	Jonas Kierdorf

No.	Pos.	Nation	Player
12	GK	GER	Marcel Engelhardt
13	MF	GER	Lukas Kierdorf
14	FW	SRB	Jovan Grozdanić
15	FW	GER	Marvin Ibekwe
16	FW	GER	Mario Petry
17	MF	GER	Niclas Erlbeck
18	MF	GER	Markus Unger
19	MF	GER	Marcel Bär
20	MF	GER	Nils Göwecke
21	MF	USA	Omar Castro
—	MF	KOR	Lee Joon-hyup

=== Staff ===
Position	Staff
Manager	Henning Bürger
Assistant manager	Markus Unger
Team manager	Frank Demaré
Caretaker	Heinz Seifert
