= 2012–13 Eintracht Braunschweig season =

Eintracht Braunschweig
2012–13 season
- Chairman: Sebastian Ebel
- Manager: Torsten Lieberknecht
- Stadium: Eintracht-Stadion
- 2. Bundesliga: 2nd (promoted)
- DFB-Pokal: Second round
- Top goalscorer: Dominick Kumbela (19)
- Highest home attendance: 21,820 (vs. Köln)
- Lowest home attendance: 18,900 (vs. Sandhausen)
- Average home league attendance: 20,454
Home colours	Away colours

The 2012–13 Eintracht Braunschweig season is the 118th season in the club's football history. In 2012–13, the club plays in the 2. Bundesliga, the second tier of German football. It is the club's second consecutive season in this league, having played at this level since 2011–12, after it was promoted from the 3. Liga in 2011.

The club also took part in the 2012–13 edition of the DFB-Pokal, the German Cup, where it reached the second round and subsequently lost to Bundesliga side SC Freiburg.

== Review and events ==
Due to the ongoing rebuilding of the Eintracht-Stadion, the stadium's capacity is reduced during the season.

Eintracht Braunschweig started the season by winning five games in a row and taking over first place in the league on the second matchday. The club never left the direct promotion spots for the rest of the season. After having spent the last two decades mostly between the second and third division of German football, Eintracht's resurgence became noted by the German media. On the 31st matchday, the club secured its return to the Bundesliga after a 28-year absence with a 1–0 away win over FC Ingolstadt. Damir Vrančić scored the decisive goal from a free-kick in injury time.

With 19 goals, Dominick Kumbela also finished as the top-scorer of the 2. Bundesliga.

== Matches and results ==
=== Legend ===
Win Tie Loss

=== Friendly matches ===
23 June 2012	MTV Vater Jahn Peine	0–15	Eintracht Braunschweig	Peine
16:00		Report	Merkel 3', 17'; Kessel 5', 24'; Kruppke 19'; Doğan 30' (pen.); Erwig-Drüppel 50'; 53' (o.g.); Ademi 55', 61', 64', 82'; R. Korte 58'; Boland 81', 89'	Stadium: Vater-Jahn-Platz; Attendance: 1,300

24 June 2012	Germania Wolfenbüttel	0–14	Eintracht Braunschweig	Wolfenbüttel
15:00		Report	Bičakčić 7'; Reichel 11'; Boland 28', 37'; R. Korte 37'; Ademi 43'; Kruppke 50', 76', 83'; Merkel 57', 66'; 68' (o.g.); G. Korte 73'; Erwig-Drüppel 81'	Stadium: MKN-Sport-Park; Attendance: 2,000

6 July 2012	Arminia Bielefeld	1–0	Eintracht Braunschweig	Bielefeld
19:00	Klos 76'	Report		Stadium: Schüco Arena; Attendance: 1,470

7 July 2012	Eintracht Braunschweig	3–2	Borussia Mönchengladbach II	Salzgitter-Gebhardshagen
15:30	Reichel 33'; Kessel 75'; Janeczek 85' (o.g.)	Report	Balci 58'; Stang 78'	Stadium: Glück-Auf-Stadion; Attendance: 1,000

11 July 2012	Eintracht Braunschweig	1–1	(Greece) Panathinaikos	Wörgl, Austria
18:00	G. Korte 67'	Report	Petropoulos 75'	Stadium: Sportpark Wörgl; Attendance: 300

20 July 2012 Summer of Champions	Eintracht Braunschweig	1–1	(Spain) Valencia	Braunschweig
18:30	Doğan 9'	Report	Jonas 27'	Stadium: Eintracht-Stadion; Attendance: 13,500

27 July 2012	Eintracht Braunschweig	3–0	Carl Zeiss Jena	Salzgitter
19:45	Edwini-Bonsu 28'; Kumbela 51'; Erwig-Drüppel 68'	Report		Stadium: Stadion am Salzgittersee; Attendance: 800

28 July 2012	Eintracht Braunschweig	5–1	FSV Zwickau	Braunschweig
15:30	Ademi 31', 38', 61'; R. Korte 58'; Kessel 90'	Report	Trehkopf 69'	Stadium: Konrad-Koch-Stadion; Attendance: 1,100

28 August 2012	Wacker Braunschweig	0–11	Eintracht Braunschweig	Braunschweig
18:30		Report	Zhang 9'; Kumbela 19'; Own goal 20' (o.g.); Pfitzner 49'; Turan 52'; Boland 57'; R. Korte 64', 66'; Edwini-Bonsu 67'; Kratz 68'; Merkel 73'	Stadium: Jahnplatz; Attendance: 700

4 September 2012	Ehra-Lessien XI	1–10	Eintracht Braunschweig	Ehra-Lessien
18:30	Ivan 23'	Report	Ademi 18', 38', 41'; Edwini-Bonsu 30'; Kumbela 43'; Bohl 57'; G. Korte 67', 89'; Zhang 80', 87'	Stadium: Sportplatz Ehra-Lessien; Attendance: 925

8 September 2012	Eintracht Braunschweig	0–1	Darmstadt 98	Salzgitter
14:00		Report	Karli 63'	Stadium: Stadion am Salzgittersee; Attendance: 500

9 October 2012	FSV Adenbüttel Rethen	0–23	Eintracht Braunschweig	Vordorf-Rethen
18:30		Report	Kumbela 4', 18', 36'; Erwig-Drüppel 9'; Pfitzner 12'; Zhang 14', 22'; Boland 20'; Own goal 30' (o.g.); Vrančić 33', 38'; Own goal 51' (o.g.); G. Korte 52', 54', 66'; R. Korte 53', 64', 78'; J. Kierdorf 69'; Kessel 74'; Edwini-Bonsu 79', 86'; L. Kierdorf 83'	Stadium: Sportplatz Rethen; Attendance: 800

12 October 2012	SV Gifhorn	0–14	Eintracht Braunschweig	Gifhorn
16:30		Report	R. Korte 17'; Kruppke 19', 45'; Correia 28', 32'; Edwini-Bonsu 29'; Kratz 31'; Doğan 42'; Pfitzner 51'; Turan 59'; Merkel 60', 87'; Boland 77', 81' (pen.)	Stadium: Sportplatz Eyßelheide; Attendance: 300

8 January 2013	Rot-Weiß Erfurt	2–3	Eintracht Braunschweig	Erfurt
18:00	Oumari 72'; Nietfeld 79'	Report	Boland 32'; Kessel 51'; Petersch 84'	Stadium: Steigerwaldstadion; Attendance: 1,052

11 January 2013	Eintracht Braunschweig	1–0	Kickers Offenbach	Braunschweig
13:00	Theuerkauf 32'	Report		Stadium: Konrad-Koch-Stadion; Attendance: 567

16 January 2013	Eintracht Braunschweig	1–3	FC Ingolstadt	Belek, Turkey
14:00	Edwini-Bonsu 118'	Report	Quaner 76'; Knasmüllner 103'; Uludağ 108' (pen.)	Stadium: Gloria Golf

21 January 2013	Eintracht Braunschweig	2–0	(Switzerland) Thun	Belek, Turkey
15:00	Kumbela 49'; Vrančić 89' (pen.)	[www.eintracht.com/profis/neues/loewen-mit-20-erfolg-im-test-gegen-den-fc-thun/ Report]		Stadium: Calista Football Center

26 January 2013	Eintracht Braunschweig	0–0	Union Berlin	Braunschweig
13:00		Report		Stadium: Eintracht-Stadion; Attendance: 1,850

19 February 2013	Werder Bremen	2–0	Eintracht Braunschweig	Bremen
15:00	Wegner 22'; Akpala 59'	Report		Stadium: Weserstadion, Platz 11; Attendance: 350

23 May 2013	Göttingen XI	0–2	Eintracht Braunschweig	Göttingen
18:30		Report; Report	Vrančić 36'; Boland 55'	Stadium: Stadion am Rehbach; Attendance: 550

24 May 2013	Viktoria Königslutter	0–15	Eintracht Braunschweig	Königslutter
18:30		Report	Kessel 5'; Bär 9', 15', 24'; Boland 16', 33', 41'; Kluft 20', 63'; R. Korte 43'; Albrecht 53', 55'; Bohl 70', 86'; Turan 75'	Stadium: Stadion am Lutterspring; Attendance: 1,500

=== 2. Bundesliga ===
5 August 2012 1	Eintracht Braunschweig	1–0	1. FC Köln	Braunschweig
15:30	Kruppke (yellow card) 61'; Ademi 68'	Summary		Stadium: Eintracht-Stadion; Attendance: 21,820; Referee: Peter Gagelmann (Bremen)

12 August 2012 2	Union Berlin	0–1	Eintracht Braunschweig	Berlin
13:30	Pfertzel (yellow card) 38'	Summary	Pfitzner (yellow card) 33', (goal) 40' (pen.); Kumbela (yellow card) 81'	Stadium: Stadion An der Alten Försterei; Attendance: 16,750; Referee: Thorsten Kinhöfer (Herne)

24 August 2012 3	Eintracht Braunschweig	2–1	SC Paderborn	Braunschweig
18:00	Kumbela (yellow card) 47'; Doğan 62'; Kruppke (yellow card) 66' (goal) 67'; Bičakčić (yellow card) 90'	Summary	Yılmaz 34'; Strohdiek (yellow card) 55'; Meha (yellow card) 58'; Krösche (yellow card) 90'	Stadium: Eintracht-Stadion; Attendance: 19,500; Referee: Robert Hartmann (Krugzell)

1 September 2012 4	VfR Aalen	0–3	Eintracht Braunschweig	Aalen
13:00	Lechleiter (yellow card) 60'; Traut (yellow card) 68'	Summary	Boland 27', 56', (yellow card) 52'; Theuerkauf 50'	Stadium: Scholz-Arena; Attendance: 6,604; Referee: Florian Steuer (Menden)

15 September 2012 5	Eintracht Braunschweig	1–0	Jahn Regensburg	Braunschweig
13:00	Kruppke 67'	Summary	Kotzke (yellow card) 30'; Sembolo (yellow card) 33'; Kamavuaka (yellow card) 86'; Erfen (yellow card) 88'	Stadium: Eintracht-Stadion; Attendance: 19,670; Referee: Christian Fischer (Hemer)

23 September 2012 6	1860 Munich	1–1	Eintracht Braunschweig	Munich
13:30	Tomasov (yellow card) 29'; Volz (yellow card) 36'; Vallori (yellow card) 48'; Wojtkowiak (yellow card) 56'; Aygün 59'; Lauth (yellow card) 71'	Summary	Kumbela 19'; Kratz (yellow card) 81'	Stadium: Allianz Arena; Attendance: 31,600; Referee: Tobias Christ (Münchweiler an der Rodalb)

26 September 2012 7	Eintracht Braunschweig	3–0	MSV Duisburg	Braunschweig
17:30	Reichel (yellow card) 57'; Pfitzner 80'; Merkel 83'; Kruppke 87'	Summary	Šukalo (yellow card) 26'	Stadium: Eintracht-Stadion; Attendance: 19,115; Referee: Benjamin Cortus (Röthenbach an der Pegnitz)

30 September 2012 8	1. FC Kaiserslautern	1–1	Eintracht Braunschweig	Kaiserslautern
13:30	Dick 25'; Borysiuk (yellow card) 72'; Heintz (yellow card) 77'; Riedel (red card) 90'	Summary	Doğan (yellow card) 66'; Ademi 75'	Stadium: Fritz-Walter-Stadion; Attendance: 33,025; Referee: Daniel Siebert (Berlin)

6 October 2012 9	Eintracht Braunschweig	3–0	VfL Bochum	Braunschweig
13:00	Bičakčić 21'; Theuerkauf (yellow card) 48'; Ademi 63'; Kruppke 85'	Summary	Luthe (yellow card) 22'; Iashvili (yellow card) 25'; Freier (yellow card) 38'; Delura (yellow card) 66'; Sinkiewicz (yellow card) 83'	Stadium: Eintracht-Stadion; Attendance: 19,875; Referee: Wolfgang Stark (Landshut)

20 October 2012 10	Dynamo Dresden	0–2	Eintracht Braunschweig	Dresden
13:00	Brégerie (yellow card) 48' (yellow-red card) 51'; Koch (red card) 53'	Summary	Pfitzner (yellow card) 33'; Kruppke 37'; Boland (yellow card) 76'; Kumbela 79'	Stadium: Glücksgas Stadium; Attendance: 27,513; Referee: Guido Winkmann (Kerken)

27 October 2012 11	Eintracht Braunschweig	1–1	Hertha BSC	Braunschweig
13:00	Pfitzner (yellow card) 89'; Kruppke 25'	Summary	Niemeyer (yellow card) 13'; Ronny (yellow card) 30'; Ramos 78'	Stadium: Eintracht-Stadion; Attendance: 21,645; Referee: Jochen Drees (Münster-Sarmsheim)

2 November 2012 12	Eintracht Braunschweig	2–1	SV Sandhausen	Braunschweig
18:00	Kumbela 45', 50'	Summary	Ischdonat (yellow card) 33'; Löning 62'	Stadium: Eintracht-Stadion; Attendance: 18,900; Referee: Bastian Dankert (Rostock)

9 November 2012 13	Erzgebirge Aue	1–1	Eintracht Braunschweig	Aue
18:00	Savran (yellow card) 4'; König (yellow card) 24'; Schröder 69'	Summary	Boland (yellow card) 32'; Kruppke 40'	Stadium: Sparkassen-Erzgebirgsstadion; Attendance: 7,600; Referee: Deniz Aytekin (Oberasbach)

17 November 2012 14	Eintracht Braunschweig	3–0	FC Ingolstadt	Braunschweig
13:00	Kumbela 38', 75'; Erwig-Drüppel (yellow card) 68'; G. Korte 81'	Summary	Groß (yellow card) 57'; Schäfer (yellow card) 78'	Stadium: Eintracht-Stadion; Attendance: 19,430; Referee: Tobias Stieler (Obertshausen)

24 November 2012 15	Energie Cottbus	3–1	Eintracht Braunschweig	Cottbus
13:00	Sanogo 5', (yellow card) 79'; Rippert (yellow card) 38'; Börner 44'; Bittroff (yellow card) 72'; Brinkmann 81'; Kruska (yellow card) 90'	Summary	Kumbela 13', (yellow card) 25'; Kruppke (yellow card) 80'; Reichel (yellow card) 82'; Theuerkauf (yellow card) 63' (yellow-red card) 82'; Doğan (yellow card) 85'	Stadium: Stadion der Freundschaft; Attendance: 11,740; Referee: Manuel Gräfe (Berlin)

28 November 2012 16	Eintracht Braunschweig	1–0	FC St. Pauli	Braunschweig
17:30	Kumbela 17'; Kessel (yellow card) 80' (yellow-red card) 81'	Summary	Bartels (red card) 22'; Schachten (yellow card) 54'; Avevor (yellow card) 65'	Stadium: Eintracht-Stadion; Attendance: 21,400; Referee: Felix Zwayer (Berlin)

2 December 2012 17	FSV Frankfurt	1–2	Eintracht Braunschweig	Frankfurt
13:30	Konrad (yellow card) 68', (goal) 87'	Summary	Kruppke 12'; Theuerkauf (yellow card) 26'; Ademi 33'; Bičakčić (yellow card) 37'; Pfitzner (yellow card) 89'	Stadium: Frankfurter Volksbank Stadion; Attendance: 4,748; Referee: Robert Hartmann (Krugzell)

10 December 2012 18	1. FC Köln	2–2	Eintracht Braunschweig	Cologne
20:15	Jajalo (yellow card) 19'; Clemens 47'; Ujah 88', (yellow card) 89'	Summary	Doğan (yellow card) 2'; Kumbela 23', (yellow card) 54'; Bičakčić 90'	Stadium: RheinEnergieStadion; Attendance: 38,000; Referee: Felix Brych (Munich)

17 December 2012 19	Eintracht Braunschweig	4–3	Union Berlin	Braunschweig
20:15	Kumbela 10', 43' (pen.), 57'; Boland 75'	Summary	Nemec 4', 32'; Pfertzel (yellow card) 54'; Terodde (yellow card) 65'; Parensen (yellow card) 75'; Quiring 90'	Stadium: Eintracht-Stadion; Attendance: 21,200; Referee: Peter Sippel (Munich)

2 February 2013 20	SC Paderborn	1–2	Eintracht Braunschweig	Paderborn
13:00	Sağlık (yellow card) 25'; Naki (yellow card) 62'; Bertels 90'; Kachunga (yellow card) 90'	Summary	Petersch 9'; Kumbela (yellow card) 26'; Theuerkauf (yellow card) 70'; Doğan 74'; Davari (yellow card) 90'	Stadium: Benteler Arena; Attendance: 10,709; Referee: Günter Perl (Pullach)

8 February 2013 21	Eintracht Braunschweig	1–1	VfR Aalen	Braunschweig
18:00	Doğan (yellow card) 37'; Boland (yellow card) 66'; Merkel 86'	Summary	Valentini 45' (pen.), (yellow card) 75'; Barth (yellow card) 61'; Leandro (yellow card) 82'	Stadium: Eintracht-Stadion; Attendance: 19,850; Referee: Florian Steuer (Menden)

15 February 2013 22	Jahn Regensburg	0–1	Eintracht Braunschweig	Regensburg
18:00	Nachreiner (yellow card) 20'	Summary	Kumbela 15'; Reichel (yellow card) 33'; Ademi (yellow card) 50'; Bohl (yellow card) 54'; Theuerkauf (yellow card) 80'	Stadium: Jahnstadion; Attendance: 6,289; Referee: Robert Kampka (Mainz)

24 February 2013 23	Eintracht Braunschweig	1–2	1860 Munich	Braunschweig
13:30	Kratz (yellow card) 19'; Kumbela 56'	Summary	Friend 77'; Lauth (yellow card) 39', (goal) 85'	Stadium: Eintracht-Stadion; Attendance: 20,455; Referee: Thorsten Kinhöfer (Herne)

4 March 2013 24	MSV Duisburg	1–0	Eintracht Braunschweig	Duisburg
20:15	Bajić (yellow card) 21'; Koch (yellow card) 37'; Šukalo (yellow card) 42'; Exslager 62'; Jovanović (yellow card) 64'; Wolze (yellow card) 66'; Wiedwald (yellow card) 86'	Summary; Report	Elabdellaoui (yellow card) 50'	Stadium: Schauinsland-Reisen-Arena; Attendance: 11,770; Referee: Robert Hartmann (Krugzell)

11 March 2013 25	Eintracht Braunschweig	1–1	1. FC Kaiserslautern	Braunschweig
20:15	Pfitzner (yellow card) 21'; Kumbela 78'	Summary; Report	Šimůnek (yellow card) 13'; Weiser 44'; Hoffer (yellow card) 88'	Stadium: Eintracht-Stadion; Attendance: 20,630; Referee: Marco Fritz (Korb)

16 March 2013 26	VfL Bochum	0–1	Eintracht Braunschweig	Bochum
13:00	Scheidhauer (yellow card) 67'; Tasaka (yellow card) 79'; Rzatkowski (yellow card) 90'	Summary	Bičakčić (yellow card) 49'; Kumbela 85'	Stadium: rewirpowerSTADION; Attendance: 12,371; Referee: Sascha Stegemann (Niederkassel)

28 March 2013 27	Eintracht Braunschweig	2–1	Dynamo Dresden	Braunschweig
20:30	Bičakčić (yellow card) 22', (goal) 31'; Vrančić (yellow card) 39'; Kumbela 53'	Summary	Ouali 8'; Streker (yellow card) 22'	Stadium: Eintracht-Stadion; Attendance: 21,175; Referee: Knut Kircher (Rottenburg am Neckar)

8 April 2013 28	Hertha BSC	3–0	Eintracht Braunschweig	Berlin
20:15	Ronny 34', 76'; Ramos 55'	Summary	Doğan (yellow card) 7'; Pfitzner (yellow card) 15'; Elabdellaoui (yellow card) 33'	Stadium: Olympic Stadium; Attendance: 51,029; Referee: Peter Gagelmann (Bremen)

12 April 2013 29	SV Sandhausen	1–3	Eintracht Braunschweig	Sandhausen
18:00	Mäkelä 51'; Pischorn (yellow card) 73'; Beichler (yellow card) 82'; Falkenberg (yellow card) 84'	Summary	Kumbela 4', 39'; Kruppke 86'	Stadium: Hardtwaldstadion; Attendance: 6,300; Referee: Christian Bandurski (Oberhausen)

21 April 2013 30	Eintracht Braunschweig	1–1	Erzgebirge Aue	Braunschweig
13:30	Boland 39', (red card) 63'; Theuerkauf (yellow card) 90'	Summary	Schröder (yellow card) 76', (goal) 80'; Koçer (yellow card) 82'; Nickenig (red card) 84'	Stadium: Eintracht-Stadion; Attendance: 20,500; Referee: Christian Dingert (Thallichtenberg)

26 April 2013 31	FC Ingolstadt	0–1	Eintracht Braunschweig	Ingolstadt
18:00	Caiuby (yellow card) 73'; Mijatović (yellow card) 76'; Leitl (yellow card) 85'	Summary	Kratz (yellow card) 78'; Vrančić 90'	Stadium: Audi Sportpark; Attendance: 9,471; Referee: Martin Petersen (Stuttgart)

6 May 2013 32	Eintracht Braunschweig	0–0	Energie Cottbus	Braunschweig
20:15		Summary	Schulze (yellow card) 72'	Stadium: Eintracht-Stadion; Attendance: 20,445; Referee: Günter Perl (Pullach)

12 May 2013 33	FC St. Pauli	5–1	Eintracht Braunschweig	Hamburg
13:30	Ginczek 7', 11'; Thorandt (yellow card) 52'; Bartels 68'; Kringe (yellow card) 69'; Bruns (yellow card) 40', (goal) 70'; Ebbers 87'	Summary	G. Korte 89'	Stadium: Millerntor-Stadion; Attendance: 29,063; Referee: Peter Gagelmann (Bremen)

19 May 2013 34	Eintracht Braunschweig	2–2	FSV Frankfurt	Braunschweig
13:30	Kruppke 2', 73'	Summary	Görlitz 11', (yellow card) 45'; Konrad (yellow card) 38'; Kapllani 50'	Stadium: Eintracht-Stadion; Attendance: 21,000; Referee: Christian Dietz (Kronach)

=== DFB-Pokal ===
17 August 2012 1st round	VfB Lübeck	0–3	Eintracht Braunschweig	Lübeck
19:00	Samide (yellow card) 25'; Steinwarth (yellow card) 29'; Theißen (yellow card) 53'; Schulz (yellow card) 58'; Marheineke (red card) 70'	Summary	Kratz 13', 69'; Boland 67'	Stadium: PokerStars.de – Stadion an der Lohmühle; Attendance: 6,411; Referee: Deniz Aytekin (Oberasbach)

30 October 2012 2nd round	Eintracht Braunschweig	0–2	SC Freiburg	Braunschweig
19:00	Theuerkauf (yellow card) 32'; Kruppke (yellow card) 45'; Reichel (yellow card) 61'	Summary	Caligiuri 1'; Freis (yellow card) 31'; Flum 84'; Guédé (yellow card) 88'	Stadium: Eintracht-Stadion; Attendance: 20,167; Referee: Felix Brych (Munich)

== Players ==
=== Current squad ===
As of 11 March 2013

Squad Season 2012–13
No.	Player	Nat.	Birthday	at BTSV since	previous club	League matches	League goals	Cup matches	Cup goals
Goalkeepers
1	Marjan Petković	German	22 May 1979	2009	FSV Frankfurt	4	0	2	0
26	Daniel Davari	Iranian	6 Jan 1988	2009	Mainz 05 II	30	0	0	0
Defenders
3	Ermin Bičakčić	German	24 Jan 1990	01/12	VfB Stuttgart	33	3	2	0
4	Matthias Henn	German	28 Apr 1985	2007	1. FC Kaiserslautern	3	0	0	0
5	Benjamin Kessel	German	1 Oct 1987	2010	Mainz 05 II	15	0	0	0
8	Deniz Doğan	Turk	20 Oct 1979	2007	VfB Lübeck	29	2	2	0
15	Norman Theuerkauf	German	24 Jan 1987	2009	Eintracht Frankfurt II	31	1	2	0
16	Emre Turan	Turk	16 Nov 1990	01/11	Ankaraspor	1	0	0	0
19	Ken Reichel	German	19 Dec 1986	2007	Hamburger SV II	25	0	2	0
25	Marcel Correia	Portuguese	16 May 1989	2011	1. FC Kaiserslautern II	17	0	2	0
Midfielders
6	Damir Vrančić	Bosnian	4 Oct 1985	2009	Borussia Dortmund II	24	1	1	0
7	Björn Kluft	German	11 Jan 1990	2012	Preußen Münster	1	0	0	0
10	Mirko Boland	German	23 Apr 1987	01/09	MSV Duisburg II	30	4	2	1
11	Steffen Bohl	German	28 Dec 1983	01/11	Wehen Wiesbaden	21	0	1	0
13	Raffael Korte	German	29 Aug 1990	2011	TuS Mechtersheim	10	0	1	0
14	Omar Elabdellaoui	Norwegian	5 Dec 1991	01/13	Manchester City	14	0	0	0
17	Kevin Kratz	German	21 Jan 1987	2012	Alemannia Aachen	18	0	1	2
18	Oliver Petersch	German	26 Apr 1989	2011	Rot-Weiß Oberhausen	11	1	0	0
31	Marc Pfitzner	German	28 Aug 1984	2007	Youth system	20	2	1	0
Strikers
9	Orhan Ademi	Swiss	28 Oct 1991	2012	Rheindorf Altach	30	4	2	0
12	Dominick Kumbela	Congolese	20 Apr 1984	01/10	Rot Weiss Ahlen	30	19	2	0
20	Zhang Chengdong	Chinese	9 February 1989	2012	Mafra	12	0	0	0
21	Pierre Merkel	German	25 May 1989	2011	Idar-Oberstein	16	2	0	0
22	Randy Edwini-Bonsu	Canadian	20 Apr 1990	01/12	Oulu	8	0	1	0
23	Jonas Erwig-Drüppel	German	20 Jul 1991	2012	Schalke 04 II	6	0	0	0
27	Gianluca Korte	German	29 Aug 1990	2011	TuS Mechtersheim	11	2	2	0
32	Dennis Kruppke (captain)	German	1 Apr 1980	01/08	SC Freiburg	23	11	2	0
No longer at the club
14	Jan Washausen	German	2 Oct 1988	2007	Youth system	0	0	0	0
Last updated: 19 May 2013

=== Summer transfers ===
In:

No.	Pos.	Nation	Player
9	FW	SUI	Orhan Ademi (from Rheindorf Altach)
23	FW	GER	Jonas Erwig-Drüppel (from Schalke 04 II)
7	MF	GER	Björn Kluft (from Preußen Münster)
17	MF	GER	Kevin Kratz (from Alemannia Aachen)
20	FW	CHN	Zhang Chengdong (on loan from Mafra, previously on loan at Beira-Mar)

Out:

No.	Pos.	Nation	Player
9	FW	GER	Mathias Fetsch (to Kickers Offenbach)
7	DF	AUT	Benjamin Fuchs (to Manisaspor)
24	DF	GER	Pascal Gos (to Eintracht Braunschweig II)
30	GK	GER	Benjamin Later (to Eintracht Braunschweig II)
23	MF	GER	Julius Reinhardt (to Kickers Offenbach)
17	MF	GER	Markus Unger (to Eintracht Braunschweig II)
20	MF	GER	Nico Zimmermann (to VfR Aalen)

=== Winter transfers ===
In:

No.	Pos.	Nation	Player
14	MF	NOR	Omar Elabdellaoui (on loan from Manchester City, previously on loan at Feyenoord)

Out:

No.	Pos.	Nation	Player
14	MF	GER	Jan Washausen (on loan to Kickers Offenbach)

== Management and coaching staff ==
Since 12 May 2008 Torsten Lieberknecht is the manager of Eintracht Braunschweig.

Position	Staff
Manager	Torsten Lieberknecht
Assistant manager	Darius Scholtysik
Assistant manager/athletic trainer	Jürgen Rische
Goalkeeping coach	Alexander Kunze
Sporting director	Marc Arnold
Club doctor	Dr. Frank Maier
Physiotherapist	Caroline Schweibs
Physiotherapist	Goce Janevski
Physiotherapist	Thorsten Taenzer
Team manager	Holm Stelzer
Kit and equipment manager/Bus driver	Christian Skolik
