= Ermin Bičakčić =

Bosnian footballer (born 1990)

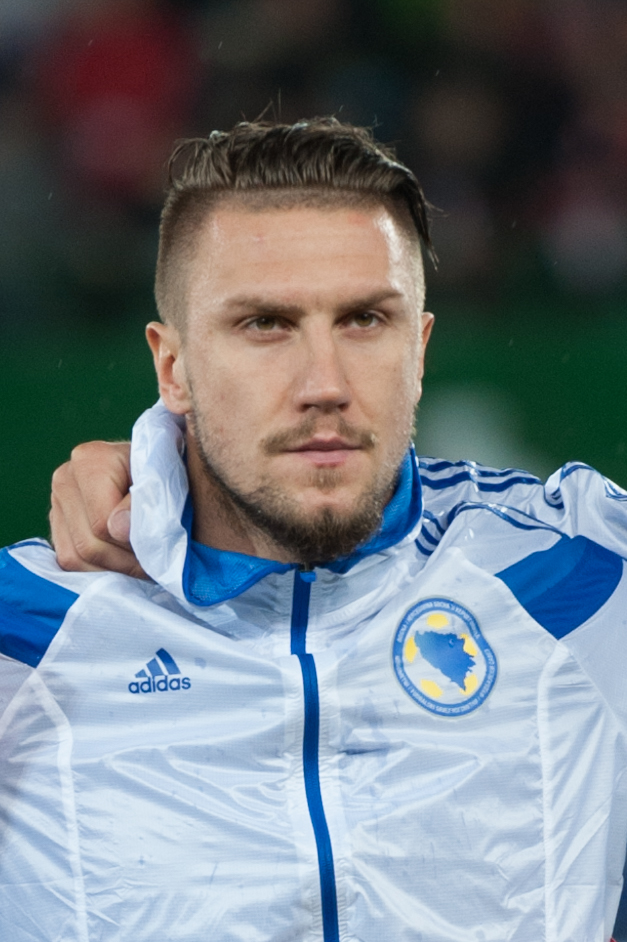
- Bičakčić with Bosnia and Herzegovina in 2015

Personal information
- Date of birth: 24 January 1990 (age 36)
- Place of birth: Zvornik, SR Bosnia and Herzegovina, SFR Yugoslavia
- Height: 1.85 m (6 ft 1 in)
- Position: Centre-back

Team information
- Current team: Valletta
- Number: 4

Youth career
- 1995–2005: SpVgg Möckmühl
- 2005: FC Heilbronn
- 2005–2010: VfB Stuttgart

Senior career*
Years	Team	Apps	(Gls)
2010–2012	VfB Stuttgart II	23	(0)
2010–2012	VfB Stuttgart	1	(0)
2012–2014	Eintracht Braunschweig	79	(5)
2014–2023	TSG Hoffenheim	130	(6)
2023–2025	Eintracht Braunschweig	54	(6)
2026	Željezničar	15	(1)
2026–	Valletta	11	(0)

International career
2008	Germany U18	1	(0)
2009	Bosnia and Herzegovina U19	4	(1)
2013–2025	Bosnia and Herzegovina	43	(3)
- * Club domestic league appearances and goals as of 21 November 2026

Ermin Bičakčić (pronounced [ěrmin bǐtʃaktʃitɕ]; born 24 January 1990) is a Bosnian professional footballer who plays as a centre-back for Maltese Premier League club Valletta.

Bičakčić started his professional career at VfB Stuttgart, playing mainly in its reserve team, before joining Eintracht Braunschweig in 2012. Two years later, he moved to TSG Hoffenheim. In 2023, he came back to Eintracht Braunschweig. He signed with Željezničar in 2026. Later that year, he joined Valletta.

Bičakčić represented Germany and Bosnia and Herzegovina at youth levels, but decided to represent the latter at the senior level. He made his senior international debut in 2013, earning over 40 caps until 2025. Bičakčić represented the nation at their first ever major championship, the 2014 FIFA World Cup.

== Club career ==
=== VfB Stuttgart ===
Because of the outbreak of the Bosnian War, Bičakčić's family fled from his native Bosnia and Herzegovina and moved to Germany, where he started playing football at local clubs, before joining VfB Stuttgart's youth academy in 2005. He made his professional debut playing for VfB Stuttgart's reserve squad against SV Sandhausen on 23 March 2010 at the age of 20. Seven months later, he made his first-team debut in a DFB-Pokal game against Chemnitzer FC. He made his league debut on 19 December against Bayern Munich. On 29 July 2011, he scored his first professional goal in a triumph over Wehen Wiesbaden.

=== Eintracht Braunschweig ===
In January 2012, Bičakčić switched to Eintracht Braunschweig on a contract until June 2013. He made his official debut for the team on 5 February against Eintracht Frankfurt. On 11 March, he scored his first goal for Eintracht Braunschweig against Energie Cottbus.

In January 2013, Bičakčić extended his deal with the side until June 2015.

He was an important piece in Eintracht Braunschweig's promotion to the Bundesliga, which was sealed on 27 April.

=== TSG Hoffenheim ===
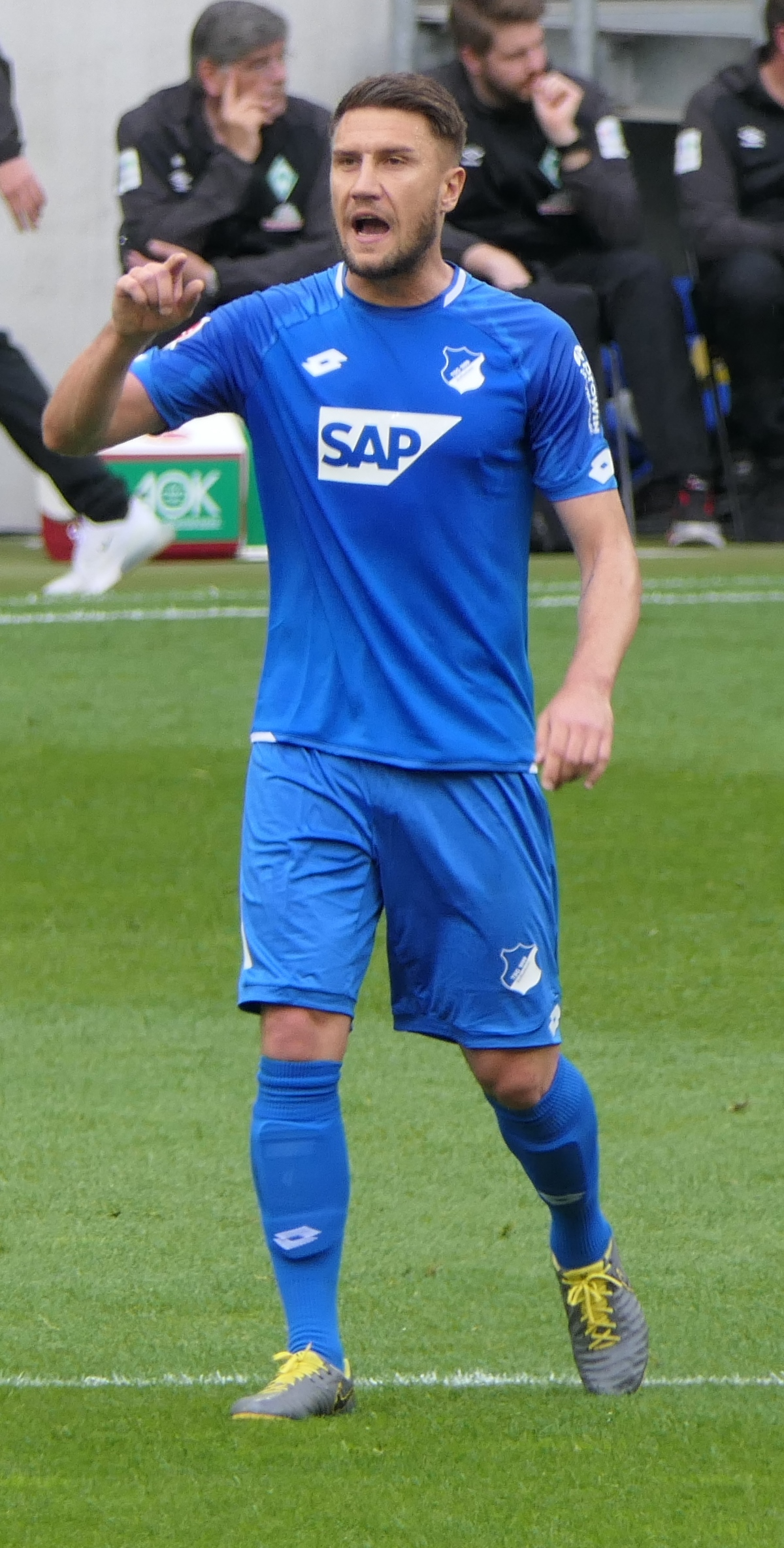
Bičakčić with TSG Hoffenheim in 2019

In May 2014, Bičakčić was transferred to TSG Hoffenheim for an undisclosed fee. He made his competitive debut for the club in a DFB-Pokal tie against USC Paloma on 17 August and managed to score a goal. A week later, he made his league debut against FC Augsburg. On 4 February 2015, he scored his first league goal against Werder Bremen.

In September 2016, he put pen to paper on a new four-year contract with the squad.

Bičakčić helped TSG Hoffenheim make their first historical UEFA Champions League appearance in the 2018–19 season. On 23 October 2018, he debuted in the competition against Lyon.

He played his 100th match for the team on 19 December against Werder Bremen.

Bičakčić signed a new three-year deal with TSG Hoffenheim in May 2019.

In September 2020, he suffered a severe knee injury, which was diagnosed as an anterior cruciate ligament tear and was ruled out for at least six months. Over 19 months after the injury, on 14 May 2022, he returned to the pitch.

In June, he penned a new one-year contract with the side.

=== Return to Eintracht Braunschweig ===
In October 2023, Bičakčić returned to Eintracht Braunschweig on a deal until June 2024. He played his first official game for the outfit since coming back on 27 October against Fortuna Düsseldorf. On 11 November, he scored first goal for Eintracht Braunschweig since his comeback against VfL Osnabrück, which secured the victory for his team.

Bičakčić made his 100th appearance for the squad against Hannover 96 on 14 April 2024.

In June 2024, he prolonged his contract with Eintracht Braunschweig for an additional season.

In July, he was named club captain.

=== Željezničar ===
In February 2026, Bičakčić moved to Željezničar on a contract until the end of the campaign. He debuted competitively for the team against Velež on 21 February. On 11 April, he scored his first goal for Željezničar in a win over Radnik Bijeljina.

=== Later stage of career ===
In July 2026, Bičakčić signed with Maltese outfit Valletta.

== International career ==
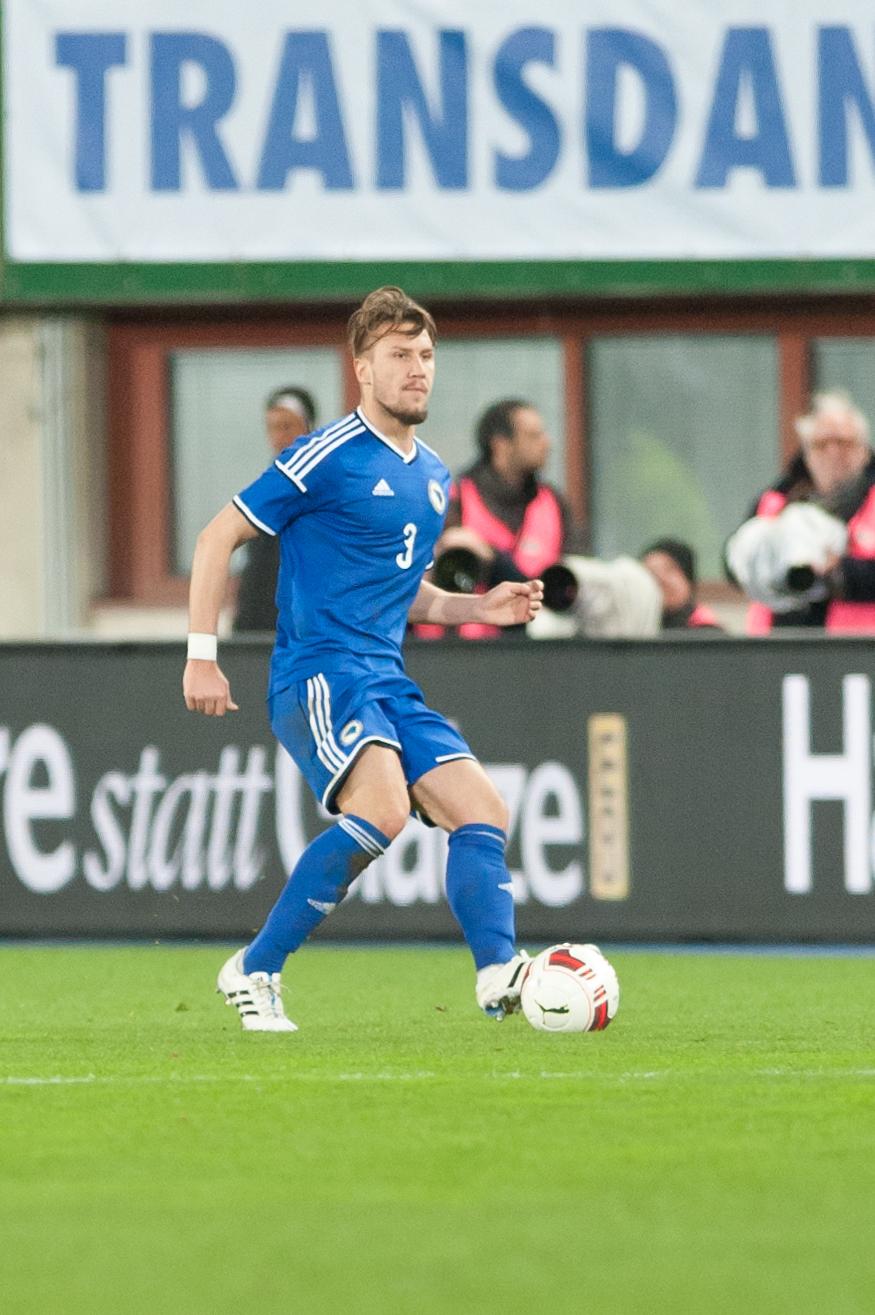
Bičakčić playing for Bosnia and Herzegovina in 2015

Despite representing Germany at the under-18 level, Bičakčić decided to play for Bosnia and Herzegovina at the senior level. He was first part of the Bosnia and Herzegovina under-19 team.

In August 2013, his request to change sports citizenship from German to Bosnian was approved by FIFA. Earlier that month, he received his first senior call up, for a friendly game against the United States, and debuted in that match on 14 August.

On 10 September, in a 2014 FIFA World Cup qualifier against Slovakia, he scored his first senior international goal.

In June 2014, Bičakčić was named in Bosnia and Herzegovina's squad for the 2014 FIFA World Cup, country's first ever major competition. He made his tournament debut in the opening group tie against Argentina on 15 June.

== Personal life ==
Bičakčić is a practising Muslim; together with international teammates Ermedin Demirović, Jusuf Gazibegović, Haris Tabaković, Nihad Mujakić, Haris Hajradinović, Dženis Burnić, Sead Kolašinac, Enver Kulašin, Nail Omerović, Benjamin Tahirović and Osman Hadžikić he visited a mosque in Ilidža during the national team's concentration.

== Career statistics ==
=== Club ===
As of match played 21 November 2026

Appearances and goals by club, season and competition
Club	Season	League			National cup (Note: Includes DFB-Pokal, Bosnian Cup)		Continental		Other		Total	
Club	Season	Division	Apps	Goals	Apps	Goals	Apps	Goals	Apps	Goals	Apps	Goals
VfB Stuttgart II	2009–10	3. Liga	12	0	–		–		–		12	0
VfB Stuttgart II	2010–11	3. Liga	10	0	–		–		–		10	0
VfB Stuttgart II	2011–12	3. Liga	1	0	–		–		–		1	0
VfB Stuttgart II	Total		23	0	–		–		–		23	0
VfB Stuttgart	2010–11	Bundesliga	1	0	2	0	2 (Note: Appearances in UEFA Europa League)	0	–		5	0
VfB Stuttgart	2011–12	Bundesliga	0	0	1	1	–		–		1	1
VfB Stuttgart	Total		1	0	3	1	2	0	–		6	1
Eintracht Braunschweig	2011–12	2. Bundesliga	15	1	–		–		–		15	1
Eintracht Braunschweig	2012–13	2. Bundesliga	33	3	2	0	–		–		35	3
Eintracht Braunschweig	2013–14	Bundesliga	31	1	1	0	–		–		32	1
Eintracht Braunschweig	Total		79	5	3	0	–		–		82	5
TSG Hoffenheim	2014–15	Bundesliga	24	1	4	1	–		–		28	2
TSG Hoffenheim	2015–16	Bundesliga	21	0	1	0	–		–		22	0
TSG Hoffenheim	2016–17	Bundesliga	18	1	1	0	–		–		19	1
TSG Hoffenheim	2017–18	Bundesliga	9	0	1	0	3 (Note: One appearance in UEFA Champions League; two appearances in UEFA Europa League)	0	–		13	0
TSG Hoffenheim	2018–19	Bundesliga	25	1	2	0	3 (Note: Appearances in UEFA Champions League)	0	–		30	1
TSG Hoffenheim	2019–20	Bundesliga	21	2	1	0	–		–		22	2
TSG Hoffenheim	2020–21	Bundesliga	2	1	1	0	0	0	–		3	1
TSG Hoffenheim	2021–22	Bundesliga	1	0	0	0	–		–		1	0
TSG Hoffenheim	2022–23	Bundesliga	9	0	0	0	–		–		9	0
TSG Hoffenheim	Total		130	6	11	1	6	0	–		147	7
Eintracht Braunschweig	2023–24	2. Bundesliga	22	4	–		–		–		22	4
Eintracht Braunschweig	2024–25	2. Bundesliga	32	2	1	0	–		2 (Note: Appearances in 2. Bundesliga relegation play-offs)	0	35	2
Eintracht Braunschweig	Total		54	6	1	0	–		2	0	57	6
Željezničar	2025–26	Bosnian Premier League	15	1	1	0	–		–		16	1
Valletta	2026–27	Maltese Premier League	11	0	0	0	2 (Note: Appearances in UEFA Conference League)	0	1 (Note: Appearance in Maltese Super Cup)	0	14	0
Career total			313	18	19	2	10	0	3	0	345	20

=== International ===
Appearances and goals by national team and year
National team	Year	Apps	Goals
Bosnia and Herzegovina
Bosnia and Herzegovina	2013	6	1
Bosnia and Herzegovina	2014	4	0
Bosnia and Herzegovina	2015	4	1
Bosnia and Herzegovina	2016	3	0
Bosnia and Herzegovina	2017	3	1
Bosnia and Herzegovina	2018	5	0
Bosnia and Herzegovina	2019	9	0
Bosnia and Herzegovina	2020	1	0
Bosnia and Herzegovina	2021	0	0
Bosnia and Herzegovina	2022	0	0
Bosnia and Herzegovina	2023	0	0
Bosnia and Herzegovina	2024	6	0
Bosnia and Herzegovina	2025	2	0
Total		43	3

Scores and results list Bosnia and Herzegovina's goal tally first, score column indicates score after each Bičakčić goal.

List of international goals scored by Ermin Bičakčić
No.	Date	Venue	Cap	Opponent	Score	Result	Competition
1	10 September 2013	Štadión pod Dubňom, Žilina, Slovakia	3	Slovakia	1–1	2–1	2014 FIFA World Cup qualification
2	6 September 2015	Bilino Polje, Zenica, Bosnia and Herzegovina	12	Andorra	1–0	3–0	UEFA Euro 2016 qualifying
3	25 March 2017	Bilino Polje, Zenica, Bosnia and Herzegovina	17	Gibraltar	5–0	5–0	2018 FIFA World Cup qualification

== Honours ==
Valletta

- Maltese Super Cup: 2026
