= Orhan Ademi =

Swiss footballer (born 1991)

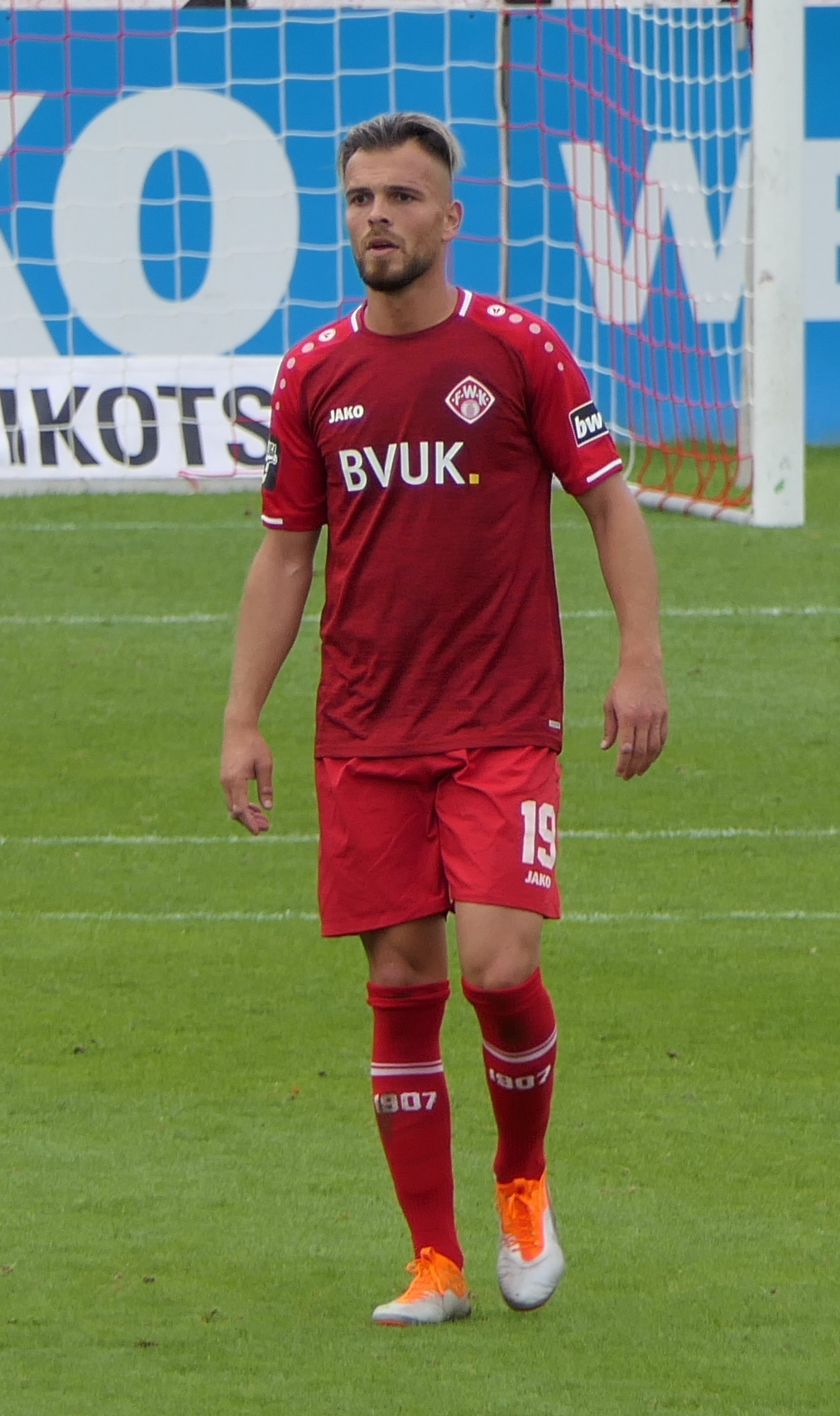
- Ademi in 2018

Personal information
- Date of birth: 28 October 1991 (age 35)
- Place of birth: Altstätten, Switzerland
- Height: 1.88 m (6 ft 2 in)
- Position: Forward

Team information
- Current team: 1. FC Bocholt
- Number: 32

Youth career
- –2008: FC Au-Berneck
- 2008–2009: Rheindorf Altach

Senior career*
Years	Team	Apps	(Gls)
2008–2012	Rheindorf Altach	96	(30)
2012–2016	Eintracht Braunschweig	79	(6)
2013–2016	Eintracht Braunschweig II	5	(4)
2015	→ VfR Aalen (loan)	11	(3)
2016–2017	SV Ried	28	(3)
2017–2019	Würzburger Kickers	68	(23)
2019–2020	Eintracht Braunschweig	13	(2)
2020–2022	MSV Duisburg	60	(14)
2022	UTA Arad	8	(0)
2023	VfB Oldenburg	12	(0)
2023–	1. FC Bocholt	4	(0)
- * Club domestic league appearances and goals as of 25 April 2024

Orhan Ademi (born 28 October 1991) is a Swiss professional footballer who plays as forward for Regionalliga West club 1. FC Bocholt.

== Early life and career ==
Ademi is of Macedonian Albanian descent. His parents emigrated to St. Gallen, Switzerland from Kumanovo. Ademi began his footballing career as a teenager at Au-Berneck before moving to SCR Altach.

== Club career ==
Ademi started his senior career in Austria, playing for SC Rheindorf Altach from 2008 until 2012. For the 2012–13 season he transferred to 2. Bundesliga side Eintracht Braunschweig. During his first season with his new club, Braunschweig and Ademi won promotion to the Bundesliga. Ademi scored his first goal in the Bundesliga against Schalke 04 on 19 October 2013.

In January 2015, Ademi joined VfR Aalen on a six-month loan deal. On 31 August 2016, he transferred to Austrian club SV Ried.

In September 2020, he moved to MSV Duisburg. He left Duisburg in the summer of 2022. On 11 July 2022, he joined UTA Arad.

On 1 February 2023, Ademi joined 3. Liga club VfB Oldenburg.

In October 2023, he joined 1. FC Bocholt on a contract until the end of the season.

== International career ==
On 2 October 2012, Ademi received his first call up to the Switzerland national under-21 football team for the two UEFA European Under-21 Football Championship 2013 qualification play-off games against Germany, although he did not see the field in either play-off game.

== Career statistics ==
As of 2 October 2022

Appearances and goals by club, season and competition
Club	Season	Division	League		Cup		Continental/ Other		Total	
Club	Season	Division	Apps	Goals	Apps	Goals	Apps	Goals	Apps	Goals
SCR Altach	2008–09	Austrian Football Bundesliga	2	0	0	0	—		3	0
SCR Altach	2009–10	2. Liga	30	5	1	0	—		31	5
SCR Altach	2010–11	2. Liga	33	17	3	1	—		36	18
SCR Altach	2011–12	2. Liga	31	8	1	0	—		32	8
SCR Altach	Total		96	30	5	1	—		101	31
Eintracht Braunschweig	2012–13	2. Bundesliga	30	4	2	0	—		32	4
Eintracht Braunschweig	2013–14	Bundesliga	25	1	1	0	—		26	1
Eintracht Braunschweig	2014–15	2. Bundesliga	5	0	1	0	—		6	0
Eintracht Braunschweig	2015–16	2. Bundesliga	18	1	2	2	—		20	3
Eintracht Braunschweig	2016–17	2. Bundesliga	1	0	0	0	—		1	0
Eintracht Braunschweig	Total		79	6	6	2	—		85	8
Eintracht Braunschweig II	2013–14	Regionalliga Nord	1	1	—		—		1	1
Eintracht Braunschweig II	2014–15	Regionalliga Nord	3	3	—		—		3	3
Eintracht Braunschweig II	2015–16	Regionalliga Nord	1	0	—		—		1	0
Eintracht Braunschweig II	Total		5	4	—		—		5	4
VfR Aalen (loan)	2014–15	2. Bundesliga	11	3	1	0	—		12	3
SV Ried	2015–16	Austrian Football Bundesliga	28	3	1	0	—		29	3
Würzburger Kickers	2017–18	3. Liga	33	12	—		—		33	12
Würzburger Kickers	2018–19	3. Liga	35	11	—		—		35	11
Würzburger Kickers	Total		68	23	—		—		68	23
Eintracht Braunschweig	2019–20	3. Liga	13	2	—		—		13	2
MSV Duisburg	2020–21	3. Liga	23	2	1	0	—		24	2
MSV Duisburg	2021–22	3. Liga	37	12	—		—		37	12
MSV Duisburg	Total		60	14	1	0	—		61	14
UTA Arad	2022–23	Liga I	8	0	1	0	—		9	0
Career total			368	85	15	3	—		383	88

== Honours ==
Würzburger Kickers

- Bavarian Cup: 2018–19
