= Kevin Kratz =

German footballer (born 1987)

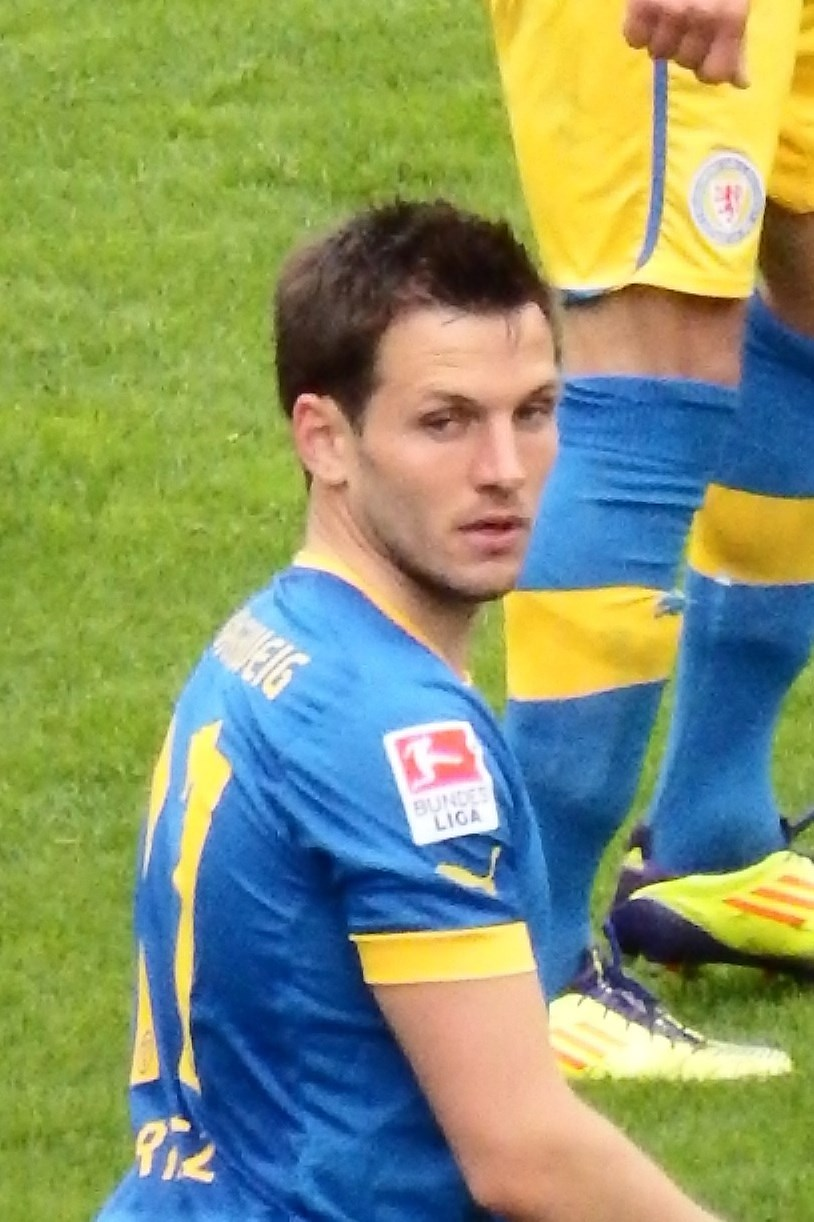
- Kratz with Eintracht Braunschweig in 2013

Personal information
- Date of birth: 21 January 1987 (age 39)
- Place of birth: Eschweiler, West Germany
- Height: 1.73 m (5 ft 8 in)
- Position: Midfielder

Youth career
- 1991–1994: SCB Laurenzberg
- 1994–1997: Germania Dürwiß
- 1997–2006: Bayer Leverkusen

Senior career*
| Years | Team | Apps | (Gls) |
| 2006–2009 | Bayer Leverkusen II | 89 | (12) |
| 2009–2012 | Alemannia Aachen | 68 | (3) |
| 2012–2014 | Eintracht Braunschweig | 32 | (1) |
| 2014–2016 | SV Sandhausen | 22 | (0) |
| 2016 | Philadelphia Union | 0 | (0) |
| 2017–2019 | Atlanta United | 48 | (3) |
| 2018–2019 | → Atlanta United 2 (loan) | 10 | (0) |
| Total | | 214 | (16) |

Managerial career
- 2019–2023: Atlanta United (academy)
- 2023-present: Roswell SC (academy)
- * Club domestic league appearances and goals

Kevin Kratz (born 21 January 1987) is a German professional football manager and former player who is the current director of coaching at Roswell Soccer Club.

== Playing career ==
=== Europe ===
After spending three seasons with Bayer 04 Leverkusen's reserve team early in his career, Kratz joined Alemannia Aachen in the 2. Bundesliga. After Aachen was relegated from the 2. Bundesliga at the end of the 2011–12 season, he transferred to Eintracht Braunschweig. With his new club, Kratz won promotion to the Bundesliga in 2013. After the 2013–14 Bundesliga season, Kratz transferred to SV Sandhausen.

=== Philadelphia Union ===
In September 2016, Kratz signed with Philadelphia Union of Major League Soccer in the United States. Union Sporting Director Earnie Stewart indicated that Kratz would find a place in the Union midfield, stating "Kevin provides us valuable depth in multiple positions across our midfield." Union coach Jim Curtin likewise indicated that Kratz would fit into a central position in the midfield but suggested that he would be used as a backup for existing Union players. Philadelphia later announced that Kratz would not be returning to the team for the 2017 season.

=== Atlanta United FC ===
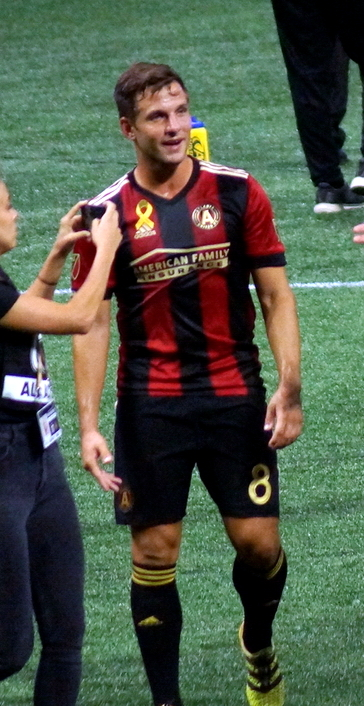
Kevin Kratz after playing for Atlanta United on 24 September 2017

On 11 December 2016, Philadelphia announced that it had completed its transaction to send midfielder Kratz to Atlanta United, acquiring the expansion club’s fourth-round pick in the 2020 MLS SuperDraft in exchange for Kratz.

After scoring on two free kicks, one being the game-winning goal, against Montreal Impact on 28 April 2018, Kratz won both MLS Goal of the Week honors and MLS Team of the Week bench honors for Week 9 of the 2018 season.

== Managerial career ==
=== Atlanta United Academy ===
In circa February 2019, Kratz re-joined Atlanta United as a talent scout and was the acting Head of Football Operations and Transfers at a point, and helped during the 2019 MLS SuperDraft with player selection.

In March 2020, Kratz was appointed as the new manager for Atlanta United's Under-16 program due to COVID-19 furloughs. Kratz is praised by his club's front office and is touted by This Week in MLS as one of the "Top 10 Youth Managers for MLS Clubs".

In 2023, Kratz led Atlanta United's Under 16 team to their first ever MLS Next Championship in a dominant tournament run, and was selected as a part of Wayne Rooney's staff in the 2023 MLS All Star Game subsequently.

=== Roswell Soccer Club ===
In September 2023, Kratz was appointed Director of Coaching for Roswell Soccer Club in Roswell, Georgia. He is the head coach of the boys' under-18 side, who compete in MLS Next. Kratz took over the squad and lead them to back-to-back promotions, firstly from the ECRL to ECNL, and then to MLS Next.

== Personal life ==
Kratz earned his U.S. green card in July 2017. This status also qualifies him as a domestic player for MLS roster purposes.

Kevin and his wife, Martina, have 3 children.

== Career statistics ==
As of matches played on 11 November 2018

Appearances and goals by club, season and competition
| Club | Season | League | | | Cup | | Other | | Total | |
| Club | Season | League | Apps | Goals | Apps | Goals | Apps | Goals | Apps | Goals |
|---|---|---|---|---|---|---|---|---|---|---|
| Bayer Leverkusen II | 2006–07 | Regionalliga Nord | 28 | 2 | — | | — | | 28 | 2 |
| Bayer Leverkusen II | 2007–08 | Oberliga Nordrhein | 28 | 4 | 1 | 0 | — | | 29 | 4 |
| Bayer Leverkusen II | 2008–09 | Regionalliga West | 33 | 6 | — | | — | | 33 | 6 |
| Bayer Leverkusen II | Total | | 89 | 12 | 1 | 0 | — | | 90 | 12 |
| Alemannia Aachen | 2009–10 | 2. Bundesliga | 18 | 1 | 1 | 0 | — | | 19 | 1 |
| Alemannia Aachen | 2010–11 | 2. Bundesliga | 30 | 2 | 4 | 0 | — | | 34 | 2 |
| Alemannia Aachen | 2011–12 | 2. Bundesliga | 20 | 0 | 1 | 1 | — | | 21 | 1 |
| Alemannia Aachen | Total | | 68 | 3 | 6 | 1 | — | | 74 | 4 |
| Eintracht Braunschweig | 2012–13 | 2. Bundesliga | 18 | 0 | 1 | 2 | — | | 19 | 2 |
| Eintracht Braunschweig | 2013–14 | Bundesliga | 14 | 1 | 1 | 0 | — | | 15 | 1 |
| Eintracht Braunschweig | Total | | 32 | 1 | 2 | 2 | — | | 34 | 3 |
| SV Sandhausen | 2014–15 | 2. Bundesliga | 15 | 0 | 0 | 0 | — | | 15 | 0 |
| SV Sandhausen | 2015–16 | 2. Bundesliga | 7 | 0 | 1 | 0 | — | | 8 | 0 |
| SV Sandhausen | Total | | 22 | 0 | 1 | 0 | — | | 23 | 0 |
| Philadelphia Union | 2016 | MLS | 0 | 0 | 0 | 0 | — | | 0 | 0 |
| Atlanta United | 2017 | MLS | 20 | 1 | 2 | 1 | — | | 22 | 2 |
| Atlanta United | 2018 | MLS | 27 | 2 | 2 | 0 | 1 | 0 | 29 | 2 |
| Atlanta United | Total | | 47 | 3 | 4 | 1 | 1 | 0 | 52 | 4 |
| Atlanta United 2 | 2018 | USL | 2 | 0 | 0 | 0 | — | | 2 | 0 |
| Career total | | | 260 | 19 | 14 | 4 | 1 | 0 | 275 | 23 |
