= Patrick Bick =

German footballer

Personal information
- Date of birth: 12 March 1977 (age 49)
- Place of birth: Illingen, West Germany
- Height: 1.74 m (5 ft 9 in)
- Position: Midfielder

Youth career
- 1982–1997: VfB Hüttigweiler

Senior career*
Years	Team	Apps	(Gls)
1997–1998	RW Hasborn-Dautweiler		
1998–1999	1. FC Saarbrücken		
1999–2000	FC Homburg		
2000–2003	SV Elversberg	70	(6)
2003	FC Augsburg	10	(2)
2004–2007	Eintracht Braunschweig	85	(14)
2007–2008	SV Wehen Wiesbaden	33	(2)
2009–2011	RB Leipzig	26	(5)
2011–2013	SSV Markranstädt		
- * Club domestic league appearances and goals

Patrick Bick (born 12 March 1977 in Illingen) is a former German football player who last played for SSV Markranstädt.

== Career ==
He made his debut on the professional league level in the 2. Bundesliga for Eintracht Braunschweig on 14 August 2005 when he came on as a substitute for Benjamin Siegert in the 51st minute in a game against LR Ahlen.

== Post-retirement ==
After retiring as a player in 2013, Bick joined Eintracht Braunschweig's staff as the club's chief physiotherapist.
