= Dennis Wegner =

German footballer

Personal information
- Date of birth: 10 January 1991 (age 35)
- Place of birth: Greifswald, Germany
- Height: 1.80 m (5 ft 11 in)
- Position: Winger

Youth career
- 1995–2009: Greifswalder FV
- 2009–2010: Hallescher FC

Senior career*
| Years | Team | Apps | (Gls) |
| 2010–2012 | Hallescher FC | 32 | (4) |
| 2012–2013 | Werder Bremen II | 33 | (13) |
| 2013–2014 | VfL Osnabrück | 9 | (1) |
| 2014–2017 | 1. FC Saarbrücken | 35 | (7) |
| 2017–2021 | TSV Steinbach | 59 | (7) |
- * Club domestic league appearances and goals as of 23:09, 12 June 2022 (UTC)

Dennis Wegner (born 10 January 1991) is a German footballer who most recently played as a winger for TSV Steinbach.
