= Domi Kumbela =

Congolese footballer (born 1984)

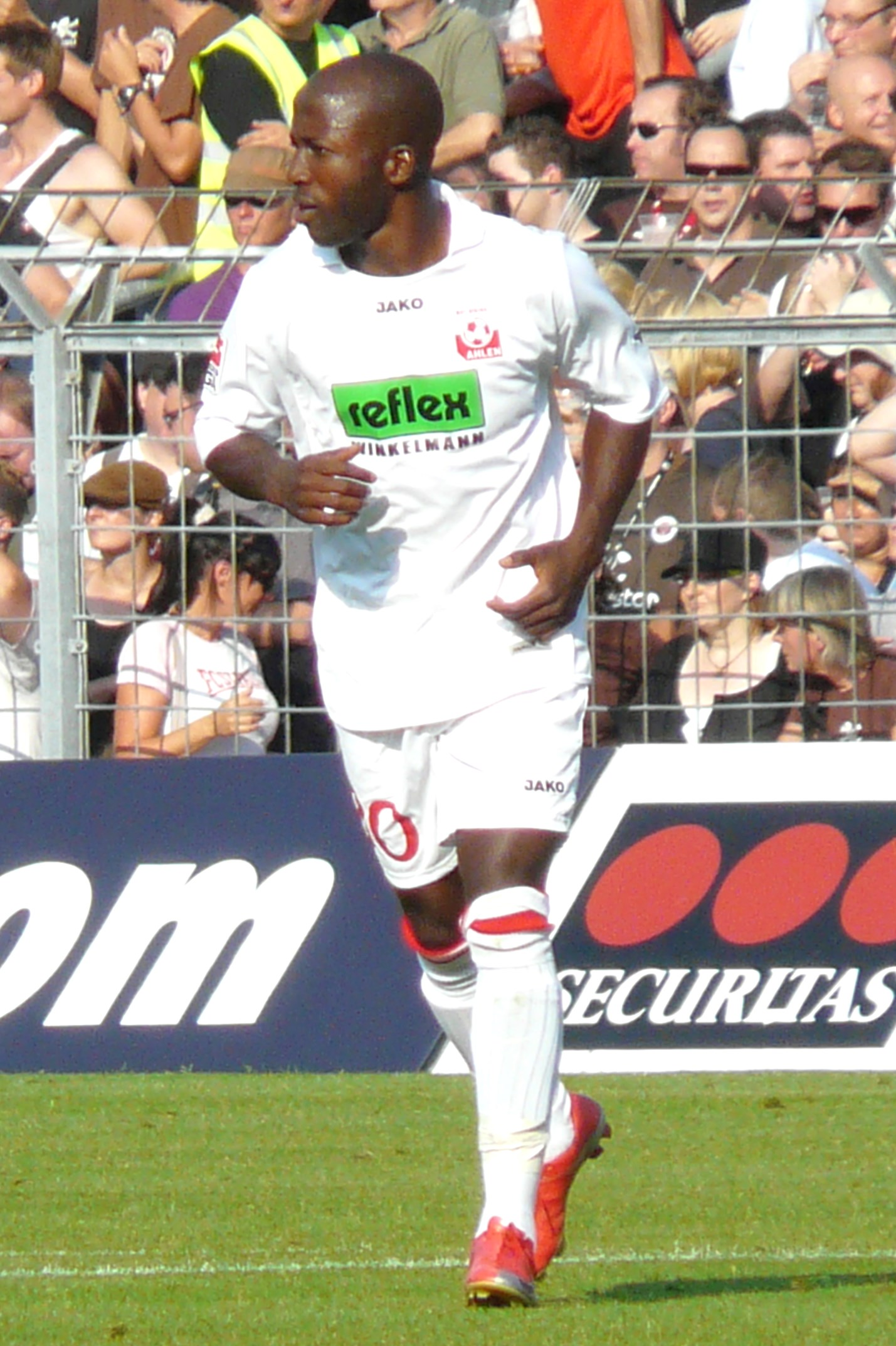
- Kumbela with Rot Weiss Ahlen in 2009

Personal information
- Date of birth: 20 April 1984 (age 42)
- Place of birth: Kinshasa, Zaire
- Height: 1.72 m (5 ft 8 in)
- Position: Striker

Youth career
- FC Rodalben
- –2000: TuS DJK Pirmasens
- 2000–2002: FK Pirmasens

Senior career*
Years	Team	Apps	(Gls)
2001–2002	FK Pirmasens	7	(1)
2003–2005	1. FC Kaiserslautern II	43	(8)
2006–2007	Rot-Weiß Erfurt	53	(17)
2008	Eintracht Braunschweig	14	(2)
2008–2009	SC Paderborn	30	(8)
2009	Rot Weiss Ahlen	6	(0)
2010–2014	Eintracht Braunschweig	146	(62)
2014–2015	Karabükspor	23	(3)
2015	Greuther Fürth	6	(0)
2016–2018	Eintracht Braunschweig	66	(17)
Total		394	(118)
- * Club domestic league appearances and goals

Domi Kumbela (born 20 April 1984), also known by his nickname Dominick, is a Congolese former professional footballer who played as a striker.

== Club career ==
Kumbela began his senior career at 1. FC Kaiserslautern's reserve side. After the club cancelled his contract in 2005 for cannabis use, Kumbela joined Regionalliga Nord side FC Rot-Weiß Erfurt. He was fired by Erfurt in 2007, when he was charged with battery after a night club brawl, an incident for which he was later sentenced to probation and a 16,000 Euro fine. Kumbela went on to play for Eintracht Braunschweig and SC Paderborn 07. After being released from Paderborn on 7 July 2009, he signed a contract with Rot Weiss Ahlen two days later. After six months in Ahlen he returned to Eintracht Braunschweig on 8 January 2010.

During his second stint in Braunschweig, Kumbela became a prolific goal scorer for the club and contributed significantly to his team's promotions from the 3. Liga to the 2. Bundesliga in 2011, and from the 2. Bundesliga to the Bundesliga in 2013. On 3 July 2014, Kumbela joined the Turkish Süper Lig side Karabükspor.

Kumbela returned to Germany for the season 2015–16 season, where he joined 2. Bundesliga side SpVgg Greuther Fürth. After six months in Fürth, his contract was terminated by mutual agreement. Kumbela then rejoined his old club Eintracht Braunschweig.

== International career ==
In December 2012 Kumbela was included in the Democratic Republic of the Congo's preliminary squad for the 2013 Africa Cup of Nations in South Africa, but declined the invitation to concentrate on club football.

== Personal life ==
Kumbela and his family came to Pforzheim, West Germany in the mid-1980s, as refugees from Zaire. In 2013, he took part in the anti-racism campaign Elf gegen Rassismus for Show Racism the Red Card Deutschland.

== Honours ==
Individual

- 2. Bundesliga top scorer: 2013
- 3. Liga top scorer: 2011
- Sportschau Goal of the Month: March 2014
- Northern German Sportsperson of the Year (Nordsportler des Jahres): 2011
