= Benjamin Kessel =

German footballer

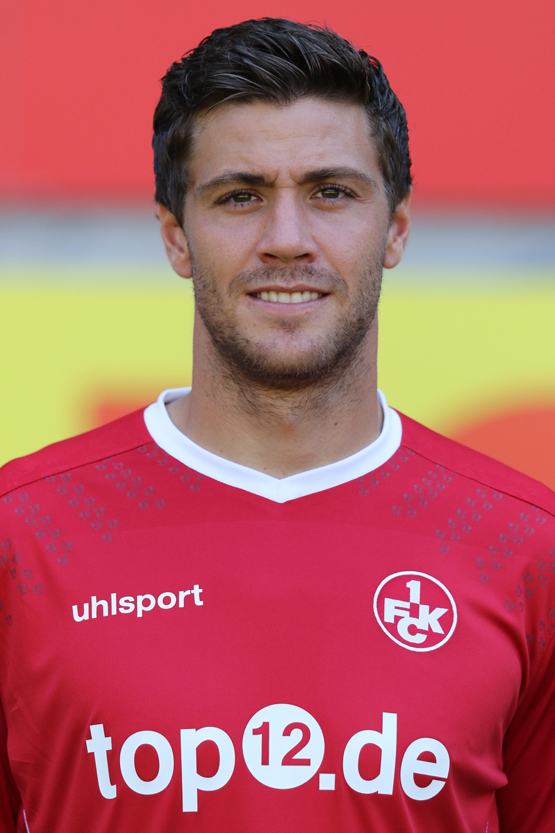
- Kessel in 2017

Personal information
- Date of birth: 1 October 1987 (age 39)
- Place of birth: Bad Kreuznach, West Germany
- Height: 1.91 m (6 ft 3 in)
- Position: Right-back

Youth career
- TuS Hackenheim
- Bavaria Ebernburg
- Eintracht Bad Kreuznach
- –2004: Hassia Bingen
- 2004–2006: 1. FC Kaiserslautern

Senior career*
Years	Team	Apps	(Gls)
2006–2007	1. FC Kaiserslautern II	17	(0)
2007–2008	Wormatia Worms	32	(1)
2008–2010	Mainz 05 II	61	(6)
2010–2015	Eintracht Braunschweig	101	(8)
2012–2013	→ Eintracht Braunschweig II	4	(0)
2015–2017	Union Berlin	40	(6)
2017–2018	1. FC Kaiserslautern	24	(1)
2018–2019	1. FC Saarbrücken	14	(1)
2019–2021	Eintracht Braunschweig	66	(6)
Total		359	(29)
- * Club domestic league appearances and goals

Benjamin Kessel (born 1 October 1987) is a former German professional footballer and current sports executive. Since March 2022, he has served as Vice President of Eintracht Braunschweig. In May 2023, he was appointed Sporting Director of the club, which competes in the German 2. Bundesliga. In July 2024, he was promoted to Managing Director of Sport.

== Career ==
Kessel joined Eintracht Braunschweig, then in the 3. Liga, in 2010 from the reserve side of 1. FSV Mainz 05. With Braunschweig he won promotion into the 2. Bundesliga in 2011 and into the Bundesliga in 2013. On 31 August 2013, Kessel made his debut in the German first-tier, in a match against Hamburger SV.

After the 2014–15 2. Bundesliga season, Kessel joined Union Berlin on a free transfer. Following a 2016–17 season plagued by injuries, Kessel's contract at the club was not extended.

In May 2017, Kessel announced his decision to return to his former club 1. FC Kaiserslautern signing a two-year contract.

In January 2019, he returned to former side Eintracht Braunschweig from 1. FC Saarbrücken having agreed a two-year contract with an option.

In 2021, he ended his professional career and started working at the youth ranks of Eintracht Braunschweig.

Shortly after ending his professional career Kessel graduated from the IST University of Management with degrees in Business Administration and Economics, earning recognition for his thesis on squad structures in professional football, which was awarded Best Thesis during the graduation ceremony. He is also a graduate of the German Football Association’s (DFB) executive management program, designed to prepare leaders in professional football.

In March 2022, Benjamin Kessel became Vice President of Eintracht Braunschweig. In May 2023, he was appointed Sporting Director of the club, which competes in the German 2. Bundesliga. In July 2024, he was promoted to Managing Director of Sport.
