= Darius Scholtysik =

German footballer (born 1966)

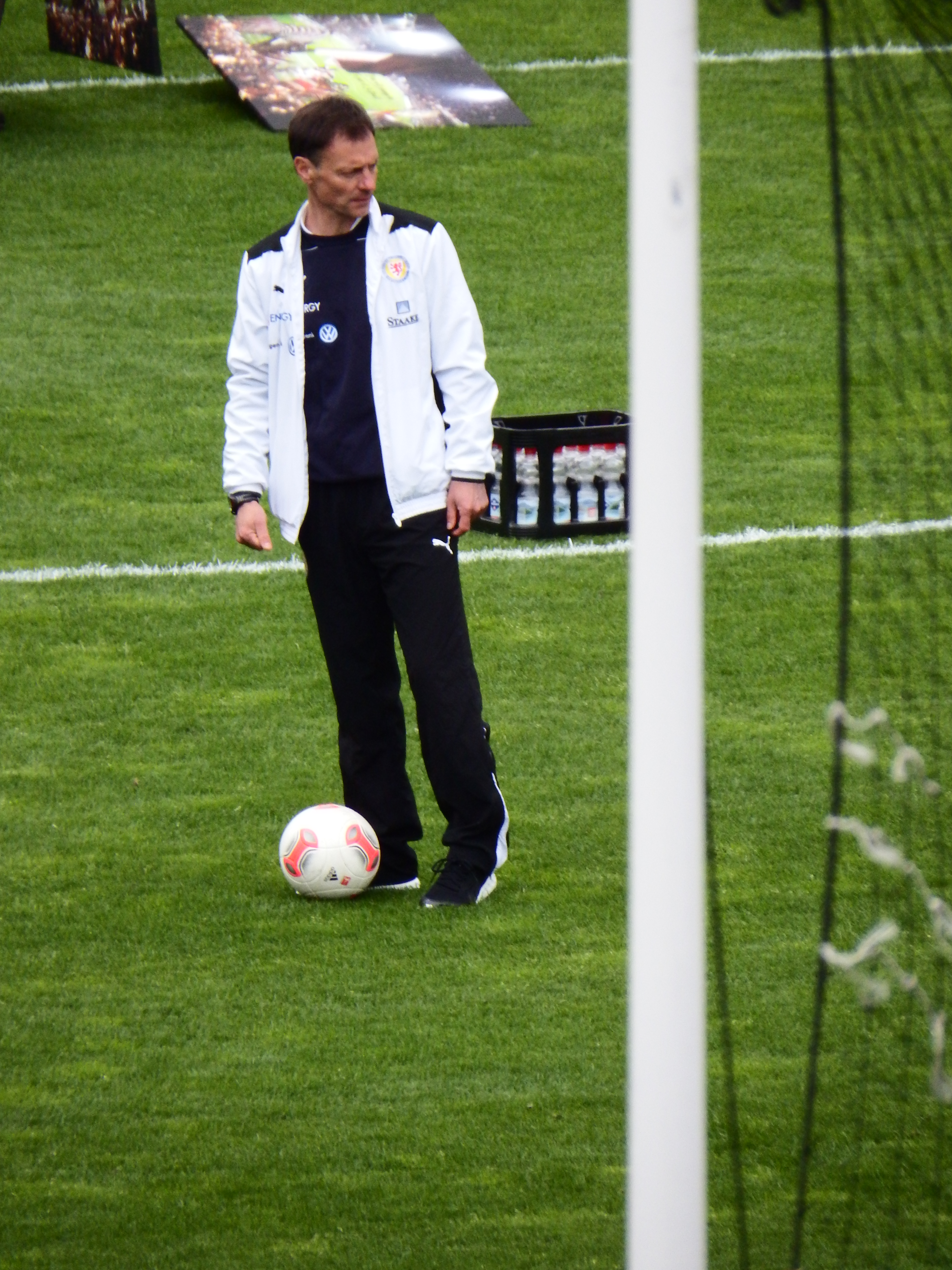
- Scholtysik in 2013

Personal information
- Date of birth: 4 August 1966 (age 60)
- Place of birth: Zabrze, Poland
- Height: 1.77 m (5 ft 10 in)
- Position: Midfielder

Team information
- Current team: 1899 Hoffenheim (assistant manager)

Senior career*
Years	Team	Apps	(Gls)
1987–1990	Bayer 05 Uerdingen	24	(0)
1990–1991	K. Stade Leuven		
1991–1992	SpVgg Bayreuth		
1992–1994	Arminia Bielefeld	30	(1)
1995–2000	Sportfreunde Siegen	69	(2)
2000–2001	Eintracht Braunschweig	4	(0)
- * Club domestic league appearances and goals

Darius Scholtysik (born 4 August 1966) is a German football coach and former player. who is the current assistant manager of Bundesliga club 1899 Hoffenheim. As a player, he spent three seasons in the Bundesliga with Bayer 05 Uerdingen. He works as assistant coach at FC Zürich.
