= Björn Kluft =

German footballer

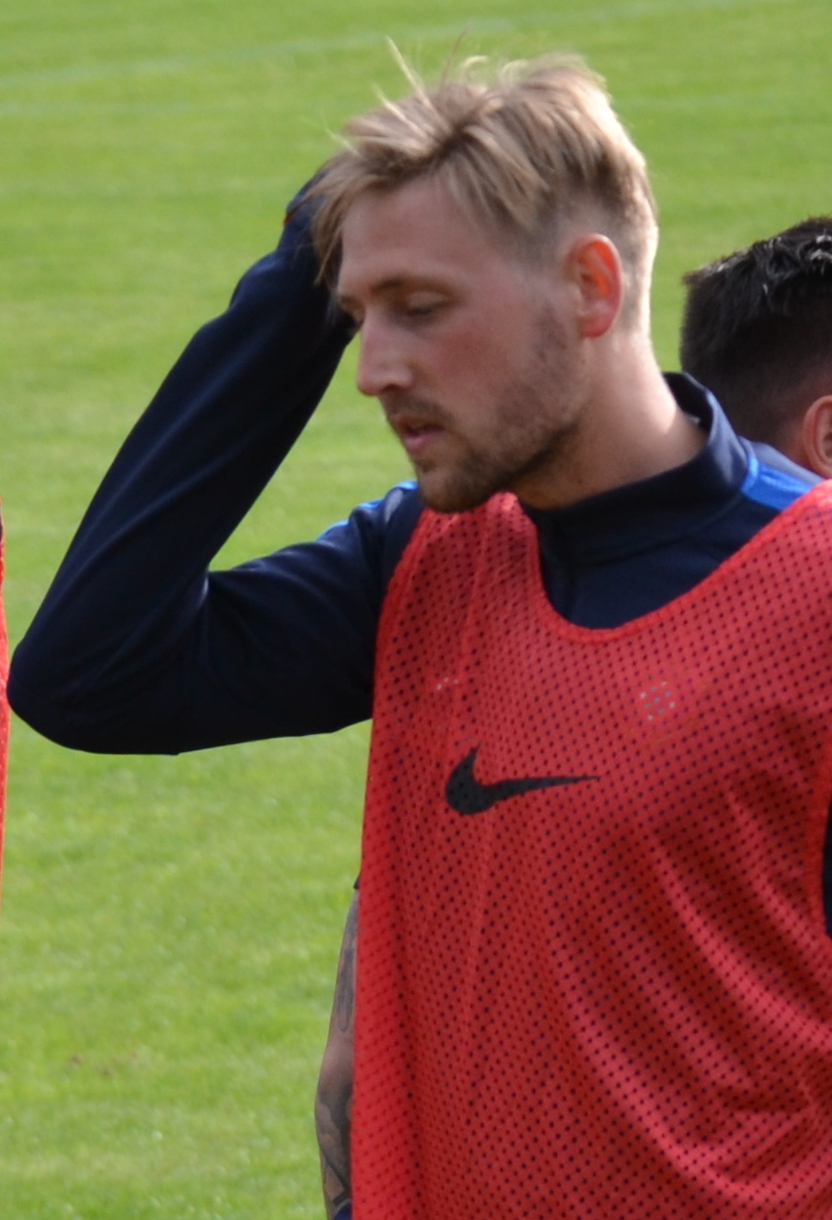
- Kluft with Erzgebirge Aue in 2016

Personal information
- Full name: Björn Kluft
- Date of birth: 11 January 1990 (age 36)
- Place of birth: Wuppertal, West Germany
- Height: 1.78 m (5 ft 10 in)
- Position: Midfielder

Team information
- Current team: TVD Velbert
- Number: 9

Youth career
- –1999: TuS Grün-Weiss Wuppertal
- 1999–2009: Bayer Leverkusen

Senior career*
Years	Team	Apps	(Gls)
2009–2010	Bayer Leverkusen II	32	(3)
2010–2011	Rot Weiss Ahlen	22	(2)
2011–2012	Preußen Münster	30	(5)
2012–2014	Eintracht Braunschweig	1	(0)
2013–2014	→ Eintracht Braunschweig II	13	(2)
2013–2014	→ SV Sandhausen (loan)	3	(0)
2015	Rot-Weiss Essen	3	(0)
2015–2017	Erzgebirge Aue	11	(1)
2017	FC 08 Homburg	13	(2)
2017–2018	Chemnitzer FC	29	(4)
2018–2019	SV Straelen	25	(0)
2019–	TVD Velbert	26	(11)
- * Club domestic league appearances and goals as of 18 December 2020

Björn Kluft (born 11 January 1990) is a German footballer who plays for TVD Velbert.

== Career ==
Kluft, who had initially started out as goalkeeper as a youth player, began his senior career in 2009 at Bayer 04 Leverkusen's reserve team. After one season he moved to 3. Liga side Rot Weiss Ahlen, where he made his professional debut on 31 July 2010 in a game against Werder Bremen II.

After Ahlen's relegation at the end of the season he joined newly promoted 3. Liga side Preußen Münster for 2011–12, where he became a regular starter. He then transferred to 2. Bundesliga side Eintracht Braunschweig for the 2012–13 season. However, due to an injury in his first pre-season friendly with Braunschweig, Kluft missed most of the season. He eventually made his competitive debut for the club on the last matchday of the season, in a 2–2 draw with FSV Frankfurt.

In August 2013, Kluft joined SV Sandhausen in the 2. Bundesliga on a one-year loan deal. In January 2015, he transferred to Rot-Weiss Essen in the Regionalliga West.
