= Deniz Doğan =

Turkish-German football coach and football player

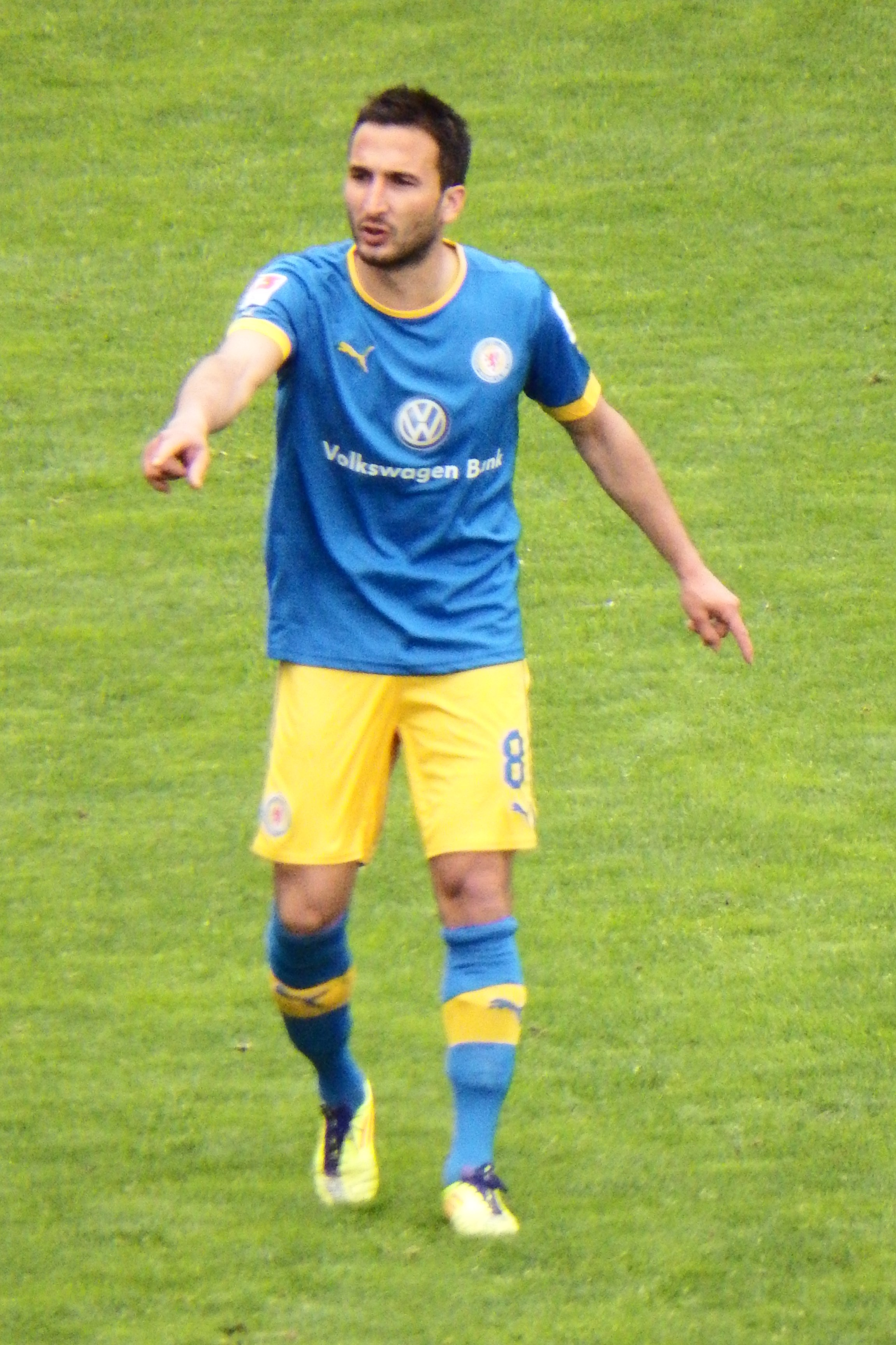

Personal information
- Full name: Deniz Doğan
- Date of birth: 20 October 1979 (age 47)
- Place of birth: Lübeck, West Germany
- Height: 1.81 m (5 ft 11 1/2 in)
- Position: Defender

Team information
- Current team: Eintracht Braunschweig II (playing assistant)
- Number: 8

Youth career
- TSV Siems Lübeck
- –1999: 1. FC Phönix Lübeck

Senior career*
Years	Team	Apps	(Gls)
1999–2001	Eichholzer SV		
2001–2003	Hamburger SV II	33	(2)
2003–2004	VfL Osnabrück	14	(0)
2004–2007	VfB Lübeck	102	(9)
2007–2015	Eintracht Braunschweig	207	(12)
2008–	Eintracht Braunschweig II	16	(4)

Managerial career
- 2015–: Eintracht Braunschweig II (playing assistant)
- * Club domestic league appearances and goals as of 29 October 2015

Deniz Doğan (born 20 October 1979) is a Turkish-German football coach and football player, who currently works for the reserve team of Eintracht Braunschweig as a playing assistant.

== Career ==
Doğan began his professional at 2. Bundesliga side VfL Osnabrück in 2003. After one season, he transferred to his hometown club VfB Lübeck. After three years in Lübeck, Doğan joined Eintracht Braunschweig in 2007, then playing in the Regionalliga Nord. He went on to play eight seasons for Braunschweig, wearing the number 8. With Braunschweig he won promotion into the 2. Bundesliga in 2011 and into the Bundesliga in 2013. On 10 August 2013, Doğan made his debut in the German first-tier, in a match against SV Werder Bremen.

Doğan retired from professional football at the end of the 2014–15 season. For the 2015–16 Regionalliga season, Doğan joined the staff of Eintracht Braunschweig's reserve team as playing assistant manager. In October 2015, he temporarily returned into the club's first team, which was missing several players due to injuries or suspension at the time.

== Personal life ==
He is the brother of former SV Meppen defender Hüseyin Dogan.
