= Jonas Erwig-Drüppel =

German footballer

Personal information
- Date of birth: 20 July 1991 (age 35)
- Place of birth: Dorsten, Germany
- Height: 1.72 m (5 ft 7 1/2 in)
- Positions: Midfielder; forward

Team information
- Current team: SV Schermbeck
- Number: 7

Youth career
- 1995–2002: SV Schermbeck
- 2002–2005: BVH Dorsten
- 2005–2008: VfL Bochum
- 2008–2010: SpVgg Erkenschwick

Senior career*
Years	Team	Apps	(Gls)
2010–2012	Schalke 04 II	44	(1)
2012–2014	Eintracht Braunschweig	6	(0)
2012–2014	→ Eintracht Braunschweig II	23	(5)
2014–2015	Jahn Regensburg	12	(0)
2015	VfB Oldenburg	12	(3)
2015–2016	SC Verl	27	(1)
2016–2018	SG Wattenscheid 09	52	(12)
2018–2019	Wuppertaler SV	20	(4)
2019–2020	Rot-Weiss Essen	8	(0)
2020–2021	Wuppertaler SV	27	(0)
2021–2024	SSVg Velbert	76	(3)
2024–	SV Schermbeck	0	(0)
- * Club domestic league appearances and goals as of 18 May 2024

Jonas Erwig-Drüppel (born 20 July 1991) is a German footballer who plays for SV Schermbeck.

== Career ==
Erwig-Drüppel began his senior career in 2010 at FC Schalke 04's reserve team. After two seasons he moved to 2. Bundesliga side Eintracht Braunschweig, where he made his professional debut on 15 September 2012 in a game against SSV Jahn Regensburg. Erwig-Drüppel's contract was not renewed after the 2013–14 Bundesliga season. On 24 July 2014, he joined SSV Jahn Regensburg. In winter 2015, he transferred to VfB Oldenburg. In the summer 2015, Erwig-Drüppel joined SC Verl.
