= Marc Pfitzner =

German professional footballer (born 1984)

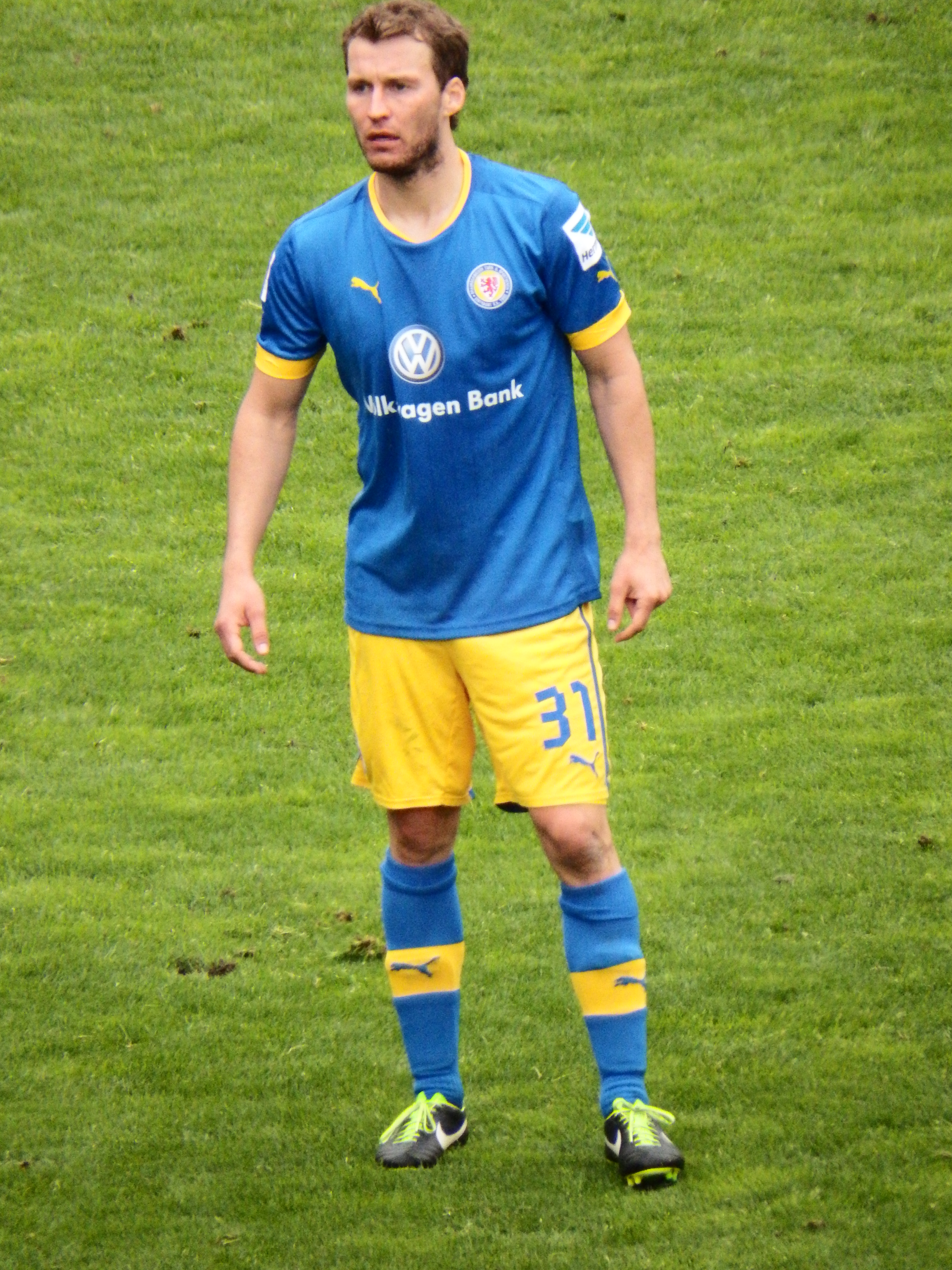
- Pfitzner with Eintracht Braunschweig in 2013

Personal information
- Date of birth: 28 August 1984 (age 42)
- Place of birth: Braunschweig, West Germany
- Height: 1.83 m (6 ft 0 in)
- Position: Midfielder

Youth career
- Victoria Braunschweig
- Türkischer SV Braunschweig
- Eintracht Braunschweig

Senior career*
Years	Team	Apps	(Gls)
2000–2002	TSV Timmerlah		
2002–2004	SV Broitzem		
2004–2005	FT Braunschweig	30	(8)
2005–2016	Eintracht Braunschweig II	85	(11)
2007–2016	Eintracht Braunschweig	197	(12)
2016–2018	SV Werder Bremen II	50	(0)
2018–2020	Eintracht Braunschweig II	14	(3)
2019–2020	Eintracht Braunschweig	44	(6)
Total		420	(40)

Managerial career
- 2023: Eintracht Braunschweig (caretaker)
- 2025: Eintracht Braunschweig (caretaker)
- * Club domestic league appearances and goals

Marc Pfitzner (born 28 August 1984) is a German former professional footballer who played as a midfielder.

== Playing career ==
=== Early career ===
Born in Braunschweig, Pfitzner started out playing as an amateur in the 8th tier Kreisliga Braunschweig for TSV Timmerlah, before moving on to two other local amateur clubs, SV Broitzem and FT Braunschweig.

=== Eintracht Braunschweig ===
He joined Eintracht Braunschweig's reserve team in 2005. Having already given up on a professional career, he finally made the jump into Eintracht Braunschweig's first team in 2007, at the age of 23. He went on to become a regular first team player in Braunschweig, appearing in 197 league games over nine seasons with the club. With Braunschweig, Pfitzner worked his way up from the 3. Liga to the 2. Bundesliga in 2011, and finally to the Bundesliga in 2013. On 29 September 2013, Pfitzner made his debut in the Bundesliga in a game against VfB Stuttgart, making him a rare case of a player who made it from the Kreisliga all the way up to the Bundesliga.

=== Werder Bremen II ===
After the 2015–16 2. Bundesliga season, Pfitzner's contract in Braunschweig was not renewed. In June 2016, he signed a two-year contract with the Werder Bremen reserves.

In May, following Werder Bremen II's relegation from the 3. Liga, it was announced Pfitzner would be one of ten players to leave the club.

=== Return to Eintracht Braunschweig ===
He returned to Eintracht Braunschweig in summer 2018, signing a one-year contract to play with the reserve side, but was promoted to the first team in December 2018. He scored 5 times in 19 3. Liga games during the 2018–19 season. In May 2019, his contract with the club was extended for a further year.

His contract was not renewed at the end of the 2019–20 season.

== Coaching career ==
After serving as assistant manager of Eintracht Braunschweig's under-19 team during the 2020–21 season, he was appointed as an assistant manager to first team head coach Michael Schiele in summer 2021. He later also served as head coach of the under-19 team, and was made head coach of the under-23 team in March 2023. Following the dismissal of Jens Härtel as manager, Pfitzner was appointed as Eintracht Braunschweig manager on an interim basis on 23 October 2023. He held this position until the appointment of Daniel Scherning on 7 November.

On 19 May 2025, Pfitzner was again appointed as caretaker manager. Eintracht Braunschweig has finished 16th in the 2. Bundesliga, and thus he managed the club for their two-legged relegation play-off match against 1. FC Saarbrücken. He led Braunschweig to a 4–2 aggregate victory and thus avoided relegation to the 3. Liga.

In August 2025, his contract as an assistant manager was extended until summer 2028.
