= Damir Vrančić =

Bosnian footballer

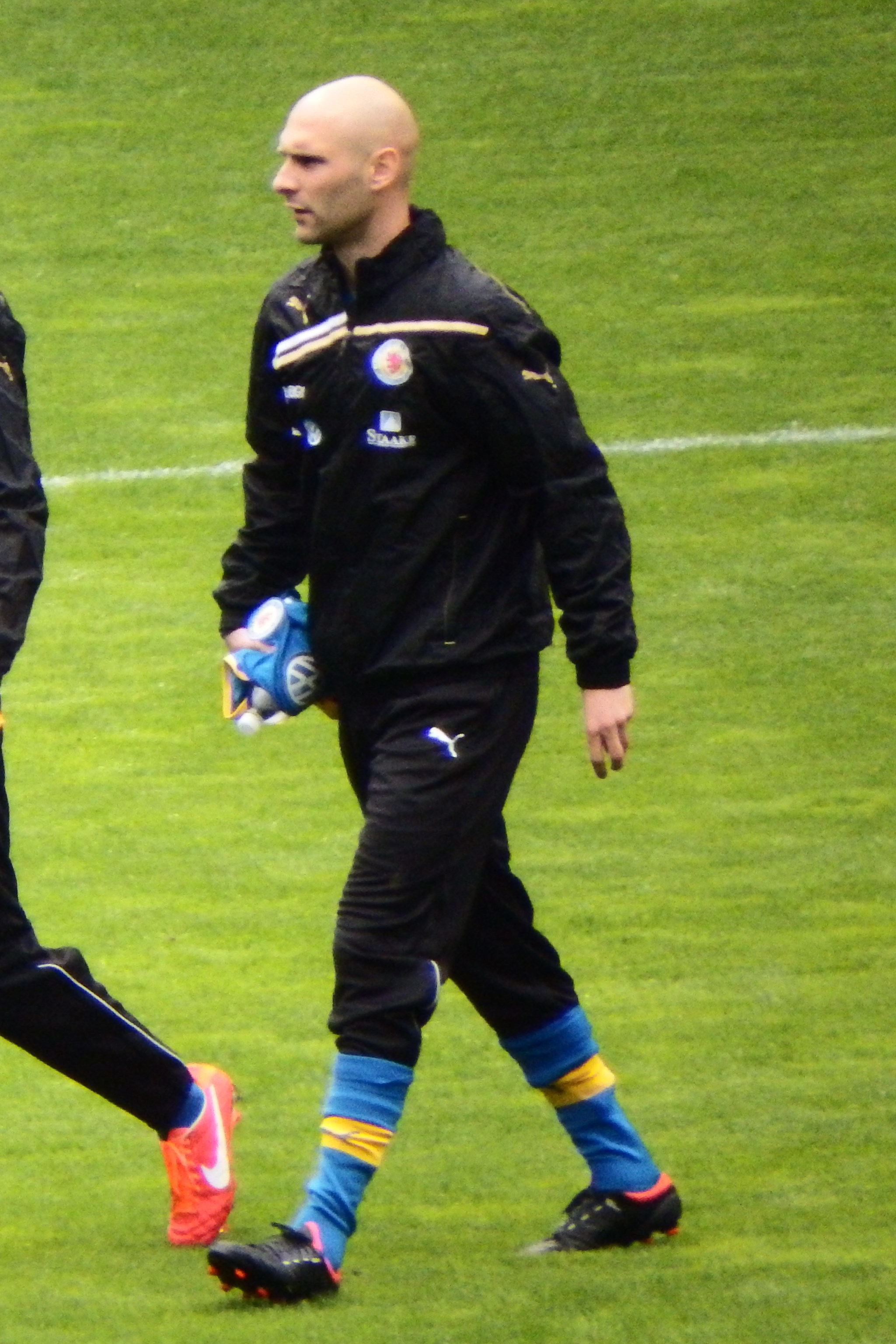

Personal information
- Full name: Damir Vrančić
- Date of birth: 4 October 1985 (age 41)
- Place of birth: Slavonski Brod, SR Croatia, SFR Yugoslavia
- Height: 1.84 m (6 ft 0 in)
- Position: Defensive midfielder

Team information
- Current team: FT Braunschweig
- Number: 5

Youth career
- 1993–2000: VfR Kesselstadt
- 2000–2002: Eintracht Frankfurt
- 2002–2004: 1. FSV Mainz 05

Senior career*
Years	Team	Apps	(Gls)
2004–2008	1. FSV Mainz 05 II	41	(12)
2005–2008	1. FSV Mainz 05	23	(2)
2008–2009	Borussia Dortmund II	30	(7)
2009–2016	Eintracht Braunschweig	132	(11)
2009–2016	Eintracht Braunschweig II	7	(0)
2016	Hallescher FC	0	(0)
2016–	FT Braunschweig	78	(21)

International career^{‡}
2012	Bosnia and Herzegovina	4	(0)

Managerial career
- 2016–: FT Braunschweig (assistant)
- * Club domestic league appearances and goals as of 4 January 2021 ‡ National team caps and goals as of 7 September 2012

Damir Vrančić (born 4 October 1985) is a Bosnian former professional footballer who played as a defensive midfielder.

== Club career ==
Vrančić made his professional debut for German Bundesliga side 1. FSV Mainz 05 in 2006. After his club's relegation to the 2. Bundesliga at the end of the season, he regularly played for Mainz at the beginning of the 2007–08 2. Bundesliga season, but started to see less playing time as the season went on. For 2008–2009 Vrančić transferred to Borussia Dortmund's reserve squad in the Regionalliga West. After one season in Dortmund, he joined Eintracht Braunschweig, playing in the 3. Liga at the time. During his time in Braunschweig, the team achieved promotion to the 2. Bundesliga in 2011, and to the Bundesliga in 2013. On the 31st matchday of the 2012–13 season, Vrančić scored the decisive goal from a free-kick in injury time when Braunschweig secured its return to the Bundesliga after a 28 years absence with a 1–0 away win over FC Ingolstadt 04.

In June 2016, Vrančić joined 3. Liga side Hallescher FC on a free transfer. However, only 13 days later the contract was terminated by mutual consent, citing health reasons. On 12 October 2016, Vrančić joined Niedersachsenliga side FT Braunschweig as playing assistant manager.

== International career ==
Vrančić was called up to Bosnia and Herzegovina in May 2007, but did not play. He finally made his debut for Bosnia and Herzegovina on 26 May 2012, in a friendly against the Republic of Ireland. He earned four caps in total. His final international was a September 2012 World Cup qualification match away against Liechtenstein.

== Personal life ==
Vrančić's younger brother Mario is also a professional footballer. He adheres to the Muslim faith.
