= Emre Turan =

Turkish footballer (born 1990)

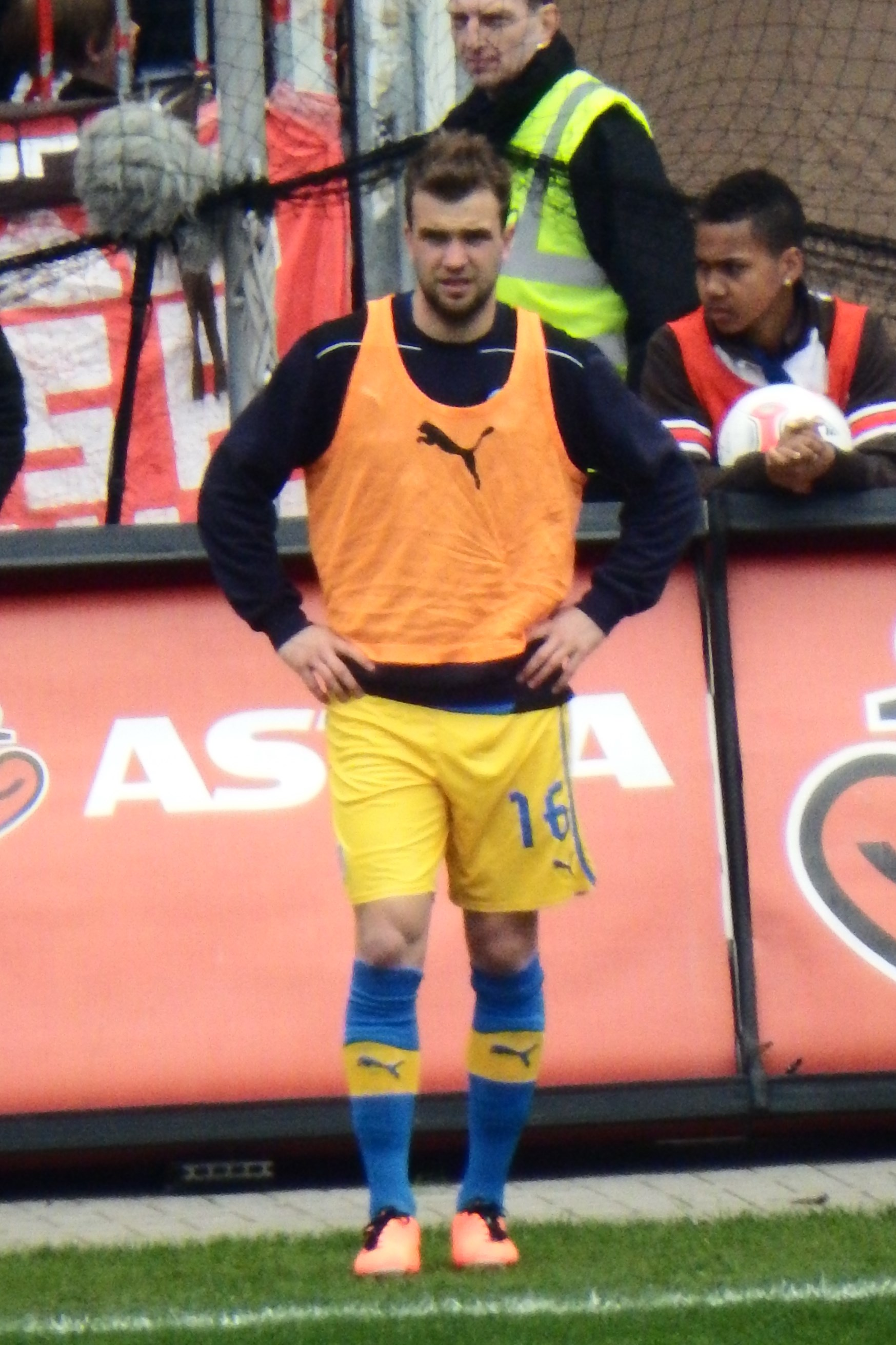
- Turan with Eintracht Braunschweig in 2013

Personal information
- Full name: Emre Turan
- Date of birth: 16 November 1990 (age 35)
- Place of birth: Berlin, Germany
- Height: 1.86 m (6 ft 1 in)
- Position: Centre-back

Team information
- Current team: Hertha 06
- Number: 23

Youth career
- –2007: Tennis Borussia
- 2007–2009: Hertha BSC

Senior career*
Years	Team	Apps	(Gls)
2009–2010	Ankaraspor	0	(0)
2010–2013	Eintracht Braunschweig	4	(0)
2010–2013	Eintracht Braunschweig II	41	(1)
2013–2015	Berliner AK 07	48	(0)
2015–2021	Optik Rathenow	154	(9)
2021–	Hertha 06	3	(0)

International career
2007–2008	Turkey U18	7	(0)
- * Club domestic league appearances and goals as of 23:03, 27 August 2021 (UTC)

Emre Turan (born 16 November 1990) is a Turkish professional footballer who plays as a centre-back for CFC Hertha 06.

== Club career ==
Born in Berlin, Turan played youth football in his hometown. In 2009, he joined Turkish top-division club Ankaraspor but after registering no first team appearances, returned to Germany the following year to sign for 3. Liga side, Eintracht Braunschweig. During his first season with the club, Braunschweig won promotion to the 2. Bundesliga. He made two appearances in the Bundesliga.

Turan's contract was not renewed beyond the 2012–2013 season. As a result, he signed for Regionalliga club Berliner AK 07 for the 2013–14 season.

After two years there, he left for fellow Regionalliga club, Optik Rathenow, with whom he has started at centre-back the past six seasons.

== International career ==
Turan has represented Turkey seven times at U18 level, playing in various matches against Russia, Holland and Switzerland.
