= Sebastian Ebel =

German businessman

Sebastian Ebel (born 11 March 1963 in Braunschweig) is a German manager and the CEO of TUI Group since October 2022. From 2007 to 2020, he was President of the sports club Eintracht Braunschweig.

== Life ==
He completed his Abitur (High school) at the Gauss School in Braunschweig. He then studied economics in Braunschweig and Marburg. He is married, has five children and lives in Braunschweig. In 1987, Ebel began his professional career as a trainee at Salzgitter AG. After Salzgitter was integrated into the Preussag Group, he was managing director of the Talkline Group. In 1997 he became Head of Telecommunications at VIAG AG in Munich. In 1998, he returned to Preussag Group as a divisional director of the subsidiary Hapag Touristik Union GmbH. In July 1999, Ebel became a member of the board of directors of TUI Deutschland GmbH, which was renamed on 1 January 2003 to TUI Group and belonged to Preussag AG. From January 2001 to 31 August 2006, he was a member of the board of directors of the former Preussag AG, which was renamed to TUI AG in 2002, where he was responsible for the departments of controlling, IT, new media, central purchasing a business travel. After disagreements arose, he left the board of TUI AG on 1 September 2006. After leaving TUI, he founded Eves Information Technology AG in Braunschweig on 1 January 2007, and became chairman of the supervisory board. He is now the managing director of, the since then founded, Eves Unternehmensberatung GmbH. Since 15 May 2008, Ebel, as board member, took over the management of category management and controlling at Auto-Teile-Unger, and since 1 October 2008, he has also been responsible for the areas of finance, investor relations, IT and logistics. On 1 October 2009, he gave up the finance department, which he had headed as an interim solution. after his contract with Auto-Teile-Unger expired in April 2011, he moved on to Vodafone Germany as CFO on 1 April 2011, replacing Volker Ruloff. On 1 February 2013, he and his close confidante Felix Joussen returned to TUI AG as "Operating Performance Directors".

== Presidency of Eintracht Braunschweig ==
On 3 December 2007, Ebel was unanimously elected to succeed Gerhard Glogowski as President of Eintracht Braunschweig. In addition, he had been chairman of the supervisory board of Eintracht Braunschweig GmbH & Co. KGaA since the company was spun off on 8 April 2008. Together with managing director Soeren Oliver Voigt, he is following a strict consolidation course and is largely responsible for the reduction of old debts (formerly €5 million). Consequently, the club was granted the license for the 2. Bundesliga for the season without any hesitation. In his first term in office, Eintracht Braunschweig managed to get promoted to the 2. Bundesliga six games before the end of the 2010–2011 season. In addition, Ebel campaigned for the expansion and conversion of the Eintracht Stadium. At the AGM on 5 December 2011, he was unanimously re-elected as president. In his second term, Eintracht Braunschweig was promoted to the 1. Bundesliga by the end of the 2012–2013 season. Ebel was once again unanimously re-elected President at the AGM after his second term. On 16 July 2020, Ebel resigned as president of Eintracht Braunschweig.
