= Pierre Merkel =

German footballer (born 1989)

Personal information
- Date of birth: 25 May 1989 (age 37)
- Place of birth: Bad Kreuznach, West Germany
- Height: 1.90 m (6 ft 3 in)
- Position: Forward

Team information
- Current team: TSV Schott Mainz
- Number: 89

Youth career
- Karadeniz Bad Kreuznach
- DJK Adler Bad Kreuznach

Senior career*
Years	Team	Apps	(Gls)
2008–2009	SV Alemannia Waldalgesheim		
2009	Eintracht Bad Kreuznach		
2009–2010	SV Alemannia Waldalgesheim		
2010–2011	SC Idar-Oberstein		
2011–2013	Eintracht Braunschweig	26	(4)
2011–2012	Eintracht Braunschweig II		
2013–2014	Hallescher FC	25	(2)
2014–2015	VfB Oldenburg	25	(13)
2015–2016	SV Elversberg	5	(0)
2015–2016	SV Elversberg II	5	(1)
2015–2016	TSV Steinbach	12	(2)
2016–2018	SC Wiedenbrück 2000	41	(8)
2018	BSG Chemie Leipzig	16	(6)
2018–2019	Wacker Nordhausen	13	(2)
2018–2019	Wacker Nordhausen II	5	(1)
2019	Berliner AK	15	(7)
2020–2022	Hassia Bingen	24	(15)
2022–	TSV Schott Mainz	0	(0)
- * Club domestic league appearances and goals as of 1 July 2022

Pierre Merkel (born 25 May 1989) is a German footballer who plays as a forward for TSV Schott Mainz.

== Career ==
Merkel was born in Bad Kreuznach. After spending the first few seasons of his career in the fifth tier Oberliga Südwest, Merkel joined 2. Bundesliga side Eintracht Braunschweig in 2011. He made his debut in professional football on 23 September 2011, coming on in the 84th minute in an away game against FSV Frankfurt, and scoring the late 1–1 equalizer on a header. His Braunschweig teammates nicknamed him "Angie" after German chancellor Angela Merkel.

In 2013, Merkel's contract in Braunschweig was terminated mutually and he joined Hallescher FC of the 3. Liga on a free transfer. After one season in Halle, Merkel moved to Regionalliga Nord side VfB Oldenburg.
