= 2011–12 Eintracht Braunschweig season =

Eintracht Braunschweig
2011–12 season
- Chairman: Sebastian Ebel
- Manager: Torsten Lieberknecht
- 2. Bundesliga: 8th
- DFB-Pokal: Lost in 1st round
- Top goalscorer: Dennis Kruppke/Dominick Kumbela (10 goals)
- Highest home attendance: 23,510 (vs. St. Pauli)
- Lowest home attendance: 18,000 (vs. Karlsruhe)
- Average home league attendance: 21,278
Home colours	Away colours

The 2011–12 season of Eintracht Braunschweig began on 5 June with a first training session. It is the club's first season in the 2. Bundesliga after being promoted from the 3. Liga. Eintracht started the season successfully with wins over 1860 Munich and Alemannia Aachen, leading the league on the first and second matchday. In the end the club finished the season as 8th, never being in serious danger of relegation.

== 2. Bundesliga ==
=== 1st Half of Season Matches ===
Win Tie Loss

17 July 2011	Eintracht Braunschweig	3–1	TSV 1860 München	Eintracht-Stadion, Braunschweig
15:30	Petković; (yellow card) Bohl; Henn; Correia; Reichel; Theuerkauf; 35' (substituted off) 87' Zimmermann; 6' (substituted off) 80' Kruppke; Vrančić; (substituted off) 75' Boland; 40' Kumbela (substituted on) 75' Petersch; (substituted on) 80' Reinhardt; (substituted on) 87' Pfitzner		Király; Malura; Schindler; Buck (red card) 58'; Feick; Benjamin (substituted off) 79'; Bülow; Bierofka (yellow card) (substituted off) 64'; Halfar; Lauth; Volland 22' (substituted off) 64' Stahl (substituted on) 64'; Aigner (substituted on) 64'; Schäffler (substituted on) 79'	Attendance: 22,167; Referee: Knut Kircher (Rottenburg)

24 July 2011	Alemannia Aachen	0–2	Eintracht Braunschweig	New Tivoli, Aachen
15:30	Waterman; Strifler; Olajengbesi; 15' (o.g.) Erb; Radjabali-Fardi; (substituted off) 76' Sibum; (substituted off) 46' Kratz; Junglas; (yellow card) (substituted off) 82' Uludag; Auer; Stiepermann (substituted on) 46' Yabo; (substituted on) 76' Lubasa; (substituted on) 82' Bäcker		Petković; Bohl; Henn; Correia; Reichel; Theuerkauf; Zimmermann (substituted off) 64'; Vrančić (yellow card); Boland; Kruppke (substituted off) 72'; Kumbela (substituted off) 88' Petersch (substituted on) 64'; Pfitzner (substituted on) 72' (goal) 79'; Fetsch (substituted on) 88'	Attendance: 17,541; Referee: Markus Wingenbach (Diez)

7 August 2011	Eintracht Braunschweig	0–3	Eintracht Frankfurt	Eintracht-Stadion, Braunschweig
13:30	Petković; (substituted off) 31' Kessel; (substituted off) 64' Henn; Correia; (yellow card) (substituted off) 46' Reichel; (yellow card) Theuerkauf; Petersch; Kruppke; Boland; Zimmermann; (yellow card) Kumbela (substituted on) 31' Vrančić; (substituted on) 46' Pfitzner; (substituted on) 64' Washausen		Nikolov; Jung; Anderson; Schildenfeld; Djakpa (substituted off) 88'; Schwegler; Lehmann; Rode (substituted off) 72'; Meier 83' 85'; Köhler 3'; Gekas (substituted off) 83' Matmour (substituted on) 72'; Hoffer (substituted on) 83'; Korkmaz (substituted on) 88'	Attendance: 23,400; Referee: Christian Dingert (Thallichtenberg)

12 August 2011	Karlsruher SC	1–3	Eintracht Braunschweig	Wildparkstadion, Karlsruhe
18:00	Orlishausen; (substituted off) 46' Müller; Hoheneder; (yellow card) Kempe; (substituted off) 73' Milchraum; 9' Staffeldt; Haas; Terrazzino; Iashvili; (substituted off) 78' Buckley; Lavrić (substituted on) 46' Konrad; (substituted on) 73' Zoller; (substituted on) 78' Krebs		Davari (yellow card); Kessel; Correia; Reichel; Boland; Pfitzner (yellow card); Vrančić 35'; Kruppke 90+2'; Zimmermann (substituted off) 76'; G. Korte (substituted off) 67'; Kumbela 27' (substituted off) 87' Fetsch (substituted on) 67'; Unger (substituted on) 76'; Turan (substituted on) 87'	Attendance: 19,648; Referee: Thomas Metzen (Mechernich)

20 August 2011	Eintracht Braunschweig	1–1	FC Erzgebirge Aue	Eintracht-Stadion, Braunschweig
13:00	Davari; Kessel; Henn; Correia; Reichel; (substituted off) 18' Vrančić; Theuerkauf; 7' Kruppke; (yellow card) (substituted off) 63' Zimmermann; Boland; (yellow card) (substituted off) 84' Kumbela (substituted on) 18' Reinhardt; (substituted on) 63' R. Korte; (substituted on) 84' Fetsch		Männel le Beau (yellow card) (substituted off) 46'; Klingbeil; Paulus; Schlitte; Hensel; Schröder; Könnecke (substituted off) 59'; Hochscheidt 31'; Koçer (yellow card) (substituted off) 66'; König (yellow card) Müller (substituted on) 46'; Ramaj (substituted on) 59'; Höfler (substituted on) 66'	Attendance: 19,400; Referee: Christian Bandurski (Oberhausen)

28 August 2011	Eintracht Braunschweig	1–0	FC St. Pauli	Eintracht-Stadion, Braunschweig
13:30	Davari; (yellow card) Kessel; Henn; Correia; Reichel; (yellow card) Theuerkauf; 65' (substituted off) 84' Kruppke; (yellow card) Pfitzner; Vrančić; Boland; (substituted off) 90+1' Kumbela (substituted on) 84' Reinhardt; (substituted on) 90+1' Fuchs		Tschauner; Schachten (yellow card); Thorandt; Sobiech; Kalla; Boll (substituted off) 43'; Schindler (substituted off) 58'; Kruse; Bruns (substituted off) 70'; Bartels (yellow card); Saglik Morena (substituted on) 43'; Daube (substituted on) 58'; Hennings (substituted on) 70'	Attendance: 23,510; Referee: Günter Perl (Pullach)

9 September 2011	F.C. Hansa Rostock	0–0	Eintracht Braunschweig	DKB-Arena, Rostock
18:00	Müller; Schyrba; Holst; (yellow card) Pannewitz; Pelzer; (yellow card) Peitz; Perthel; (substituted off) 85' Ziegenbein; Lartey; (substituted off) 72' Jänicke; (substituted off) 85' Semmer (substituted on) 72' Weilandt; (substituted on) 85' Albrecht; (substituted on) 85' Schied		Davari; Kessel; Henn; Correia; Reichel; Theuerkauf; Pfitzner (yellow card) (substituted off) 66'; Vrančić; Kruppke; Boland; Kumbela (substituted off) 84' Zimmermann (substituted on) 66'; Fuchs (substituted on) 84'	Attendance: 14,200; Referee: Daniel Siebert (Berlin)

17 September 2011	Eintracht Braunschweig	3–1	FC Energie Cottbus	Eintracht-Stadion, Braunschweig
13:00	Davari; (yellow card) Kessel; Henn; Correia; Reichel; Theuerkauf; Pfitzner; (substituted off) 65' Vrančić; 18' (yellow card) (substituted off) 72' Kruppke; 38' (substituted off) 87' Boland; 77' (yellow card) 80' (red card) Kumbela (substituted on) 65' Zimmermann; (substituted on) 72' R. Korte; (substituted on) 87' Reinhardt		Kirschbaum; Schorch (yellow card); Hünemeier; Roger; Bittroff; Banovic (yellow card); Kruska; Müller (yellow card); Ludwig; Rangelov; Fenin Bittencourt (substituted on) 46' (goal) 76' (yellow card); Steffen (substituted on) 58'; Ziebig (substituted on) 75'	Attendance: 21,825; Referee: Manuel Gräfe (Berlin)

23 September 2011	FSV Frankfurt	1–1	Eintracht Braunschweig	Frankfurter Volksbank Stadion, Frankfurt am Main
18:00	Klandt; (yellow card) 42' Huber; Schlicke; Gledson; (yellow card) 32' Gaus; (substituted off) 46' Stark; Cinaz; (yellow card) 25' (substituted off) 70' N'Diaye; Yelen; (substituted off) 54' Gueye; Benyamina (substituted on) 46' (yellow card) 87' Hofmeier; (substituted on) 54' (goal) 77' Chrisantus; (substituted on) 70' (yellow card) 90' Müller	Summary	Davari; Kessel; Henn; Correia; Reichel; Theuerkauf; (substituted off) 63' Pfitzner; (substituted off) 84' Vrančić; Kruppke; (substituted off) 63' Boland; Fetsch (substituted on) 63' Petersch; (substituted on) 63' Zimmermann; (substituted on) 87' (goal) 88' Merkel	Attendance: 4,603; Referee: Robert Hartmann (Wangen im Allgäu)

30 September 2011	Eintracht Braunschweig	1–1	Fortuna Düsseldorf	Eintracht-Stadion, Braunschweig
19:15	Pfitzner 7' (pen.); Washausen (yellow card) 21'; Boland (yellow card) 41'; Reichel (yellow card) 65'; Theuerkauf (yellow card) 90'	Summary	Rösler (yellow card) 6'; Lambertz (yellow card) 13'; Dum (yellow card) 34'; Levels (yellow card) 66'; Langeneke 85' (pen.)	Attendance: 23,050; Referee: Markus Wingenbach (Diez)

14 October 2011	SC Paderborn 07	1–0	Eintracht Braunschweig	Energieteam Arena, Paderborn
18:00	Strohdiek 7'; Brandy (yellow card) 54'; Bertels (yellow card) 76'	Summary	Pfitzner (yellow card) 37'	Attendance: 12,298; Referee: Thomas Metzen (Mechernich)

21 October 2011	Eintracht Braunschweig	0–2	Dynamo Dresden	Eintracht-Stadion, Braunschweig
13:00	Pfitzner (yellow card) 37'; Theuerkauf (yellow card) 78'; Boland (yellow card) 87'	Summary	Koch 15', 53'; Gueye (yellow card) 24'; Poté (yellow card) 35'	Attendance: 22,625; Referee: Christian Leicher (Weihmichl)

28 October 2011	SpVgg Greuther Fürth	1–3	Eintracht Braunschweig	Trolli Arena, Fürth
20:15	Peković (yellow card) 30'; Occean 84'; Schahin (yellow card) 86'; Schröck (yellow card) 87'	Summary	Kumbela 25'; Kruppke 52'; Marcel Correia (yellow card) 75'; Theuerkauf (yellow card) 82'; Vrančić 85'; Reichel (yellow card) 87'	Attendance: 10,240; Referee: Felix Zwayer (Berlin)

4 November 2011	Eintracht Braunschweig	1–2	1. FC Union Berlin	Eintracht-Stadion, Braunschweig
18:15	Kruppke 50'	Summary	Ede 5'; Parensen (yellow card) 22'; Silvio (yellow card) 37'; Stuff (yellow card) 72'; Zoundi 80'; Polenz (yellow card) 90+1'	Attendance: 22,355; Referee: Bastian Dankert (Rostock)

18 November 2011	MSV Duisburg	3–0	Eintracht Braunschweig	Schauinsland-Reisen-Arena, Duisburg
18:00	Brosinski 11', 32'; Wolze (yellow card) 15'; Berberović (yellow card) 23'; Šukalo (yellow card) 31'; Jula (yellow card) 81'; Bajić (yellow card) 83'; Pamić 85'	Summary	Kruppke (yellow card) 45'; Dogan (yellow card) 50'; Kessel (red card) 71'	Attendance: 11,237; Referee: Manuel Gräfe (Berlin)

27 November 2011	Eintracht Braunschweig	4–0	VfL Bochum	Eintracht-Stadion, Braunschweig
13:30	Kumbela 4'; Kruppke 18', 89'; Boland 60'	Summary	Inui (yellow card) 73'	Attendance: 20,280; Referee: Tobias Stieler (Obertshausen)

2 December 2011	FC Ingolstadt 04	0–1	Eintracht Braunschweig	Audi Sportpark, Ingolstadt
18:00	Bambara (yellow card) 29'; Quaner (yellow card) 63'; Görlitz (yellow card) 78'; Akaïchi (yellow card) 83'	Summary	Kumbela 44'	Attendance: 4,650; Referee: Florian Steuer (Menden)

=== 2nd Half of Season matches ===
9 December 2011	TSV 1860 München	3–0	Eintracht Braunschweig	Allianz Arena, München
18:00	Aigner 32'; Rakić 58'; Lauth 65'; Aygün (yellow card) 81'	Summary	Fuchs (yellow card) 53'; Theuerkauf (yellow card) 70'	Attendance: 16,400; Referee: Norbert Grudzinski (Hamburg)

18 December 2011	Eintracht Braunschweig	1–1	Alemannia Aachen	Eintracht-Stadion, Braunschweig
13:30	Reichel (yellow card) 25'; Theuerkauf (yellow card) 55'; Kumbela 86'	Summary	Sibum 26'; Auer (yellow card) 53'; Waterman (yellow card) 88'	Attendance: 19,950; Referee: Christian Leicher (Weihmichl)

5 February 2012	Eintracht Frankfurt	2–1	Eintracht Braunschweig	Commerzbank-Arena, Frankfurt am Main
13:30	Meier 11' 22'; Köhler (yellow card) 68'	Summary	Kruppke 5'; Fetsch (yellow card) 61'; Theuerkauf (yellow card) 82'; Boland (yellow card) 90+3'	Attendance: 36,200; Referee: Jochen Drees (Münster-Sarmsheim)

11 February 2012	Eintracht Braunschweig	0–0	Karlsruher SC	Eintracht-Stadion, Braunschweig
13:00	Washausen (yellow card) 24'; Petersch (yellow card) 87'	Summary	Groß (yellow card) 44'; Cuntz (yellow card) 90'	Attendance: 18,000; Referee: Florian Steuer (Menden)

20 February 2012	FC Erzgebirge Aue	1–1	Eintracht Braunschweig	Sparkassen-Erzgebirgsstadion, Aue
20:15	Hochscheidt 7' le Beau (yellow card) 62'; Schlitte (yellow card) 76'; Koçer (yellow card) 86'	Summary	Theuerkauf 40'	Attendance: 6,200; Referee: Daniel Siebert (Berlin)

26 February 2012	FC St. Pauli	0–0	Eintracht Braunschweig	Millerntor-Stadion, Hamburg
13:30	Boll (yellow card) 77'; Schachten (yellow card) 88'	Summary	Vrančić (yellow card) 38'; Petersch (yellow card) 65'	Attendance: 24,487; Referee: Tobias Stieler (Obertshausen)

4 March 2012	Eintracht Braunschweig	3–2	F.C. Hansa Rostock	Eintracht-Stadion, Braunschweig
13:30	Theuerkauf 7'; Kumbela 40'; Edwini-Bonsu (yellow card) 66'; Zimmermann 79'; Pfitzner (yellow card) 90'	Summary	Perthel 13'; Jänicke 52'; Borg (yellow card) 72'; Wiemann (yellow card) 78'; Jordanov (yellow card) 85'	Attendance: 22,990; Referee: Christian Fischer (Hemer)

11 March 2012	FC Energie Cottbus	1–1	Eintracht Braunschweig	Stadion der Freundschaft, Cottbus
13:30	Banović 69'	Summary	Bičakčić 40'	Attendance: 8,870; Referee: Bastian Dankert (Rostock)

16 March 2012	Eintracht Braunschweig	0–0	FSV Frankfurt	Eintracht-Stadion, Braunschweig
18:00	Bičakčić (yellow card) 80'; Doğan (yellow card) 82'	Summary	Gaus (yellow card) 45'; Yelen (yellow card) 88'	Attendance: 19,950; Referee: Martin Petersen (Stuttgart)

24 March 2012	Fortuna Düsseldorf	1–1	Eintracht Braunschweig	ESPRIT arena, Düsseldorf
13:00	Bröker 47'; Beister (yellow card) 56'; Dum (yellow card) 86'	Summary	Pfitzner (yellow card) 17'; Theuerkauf (yellow card) 44'; Kumbela 27' (yellow card) 88'; Boland (yellow card) 65'; Kruppke (yellow card) 79'	Attendance: 35,427; Referee: Markus Schmidt (Stuttgart)

30 March 2012	Eintracht Braunschweig	0–0	SC Paderborn 07	Eintracht-Stadion, Braunschweig
18:00	Pfitzner (yellow card) 53'; Washausen (yellow card) 78'; Bičakčić (yellow card) 90'	Summary	Bertels (yellow card) 36'; Wemmer (yellow card) 72'	Attendance: 20,350; Referee: Peter Sippel (München)

7 April 2012	Dynamo Dresden	2–2	Eintracht Braunschweig	Glücksgas Stadion, Dresden
13:00	Poté 22', 74'; Trojan (yellow card) 35'; Gueye (yellow card) 37'; Savić (yellow card) 81'	Summary	Zimmermann (yellow card) 20'; Vrančić 33'; Kumbela 66'	Attendance: 27,576; Referee: Tobias Christ (Münchweiler)

10 April 2012	Eintracht Braunschweig	0–0	SpVgg Greuther Fürth	Eintracht-Stadion, Braunschweig
17:30		Summary	Peković (yellow card) 56'; Schröck (yellow card) 60'	Attendance: 20,450; Referee: Daniel Siebert (Berlin)

13 April 2012	1. FC Union Berlin	1–0	Eintracht Braunschweig	Stadion An der Alten Försterei, Berlin
18:00	Terodde 30'; Pfertzel (yellow card) 58'; Zoundi (yellow card) 83'; Kohlmann (yellow card) 88'; Madouni (yellow card) 89'	Summary	Theuerkauf (yellow card) 40'; Doğan (yellow card) 90'; Reichel (yellow card) 90'	Attendance: 17,028; Referee: Patrick Ittrich (Hamburg)

20 April 2012	Eintracht Braunschweig	0–0	MSV Duisburg	Eintracht-Stadion, Braunschweig
18:00	Pfitzner (yellow card) 48'	Summary	Gjasula (yellow card) 46'; Hoffmann (yellow card) 55'; Brosinski (yellow card) 76'; Pamić (yellow card) 79'	Attendance: 19,825; Referee: Norbert Grudzinski (Hamburg)

29 April 2012	VfL Bochum	2–0	Eintracht Braunschweig	Ruhrstadion, Bochum
13:30	Freier 3'; Kramer (yellow card) 5'; Bönig (red card) 60'; Ginczek 90'	Summary	Pfitzner (yellow card) 25'; Boland (yellow card) 55'	Attendance: 18,107; Referee: Guido Winkmann (Kerken)

6 May 2012	Eintracht Braunschweig	3–1	FC Ingolstadt 04	Eintracht-Stadion, Braunschweig
13:30	Correia 4'; R. Korte 55' (yellow card) 24'; Merkel 89'	Summary	Ikeng (yellow card) 2'; Schäfer (yellow card) 12'; Knasmüllner 45'	Attendance: 20,600; Referee: Robert Kempter (Sauldorf)

== DFB-Pokal ==
=== 1st round ===
Win Tie Loss

1 August 2011	Eintracht Braunschweig	0–3	FC Bayern Munich	Eintracht-Stadion, Braunschweig
20:30			Gómez 9' (pen.); Schweinsteiger 39' (pen.); Müller 83'	Attendance: 23,645; Referee: Felix Zwayer (Berlin)

== Friendlies ==
Win Tie Loss

11 June 2011	TSV Bienenbüttel	1–12	Eintracht Braunschweig	Ilmenaustadion, Bienenbüttel
16:00	Hillmer 32'		Boland 62', 78'; Fetsch 20', 22'; Hjelm 37'; Kruppke 45' (pen.); Kumbela 58', 75'; Merkel 49'; Washausen 43'; Zimmermann 59', 81'	Attendance: 654

12 June 2011	Arminia Vechelde	0–13	Eintracht Braunschweig	Auestadion, Vechelde
15:00			Boland 34'; Fetsch 70'; Henn 77'; Kruppke 14'; Kumbela 12' (pen.) 21' 41'; Merkel 52', 66', 67', 74'; Pfitzner 53'; Reichel 58'	Attendance: 2,500

19 June 2011	TSV Hillerse	1–8	Eintracht Braunschweig	MBO-Arena, Hillerse
16:00	Ganski 63'		G. Korte 31', 35', 69'; Dakouri 6'; Pribyl 15' (o.g.); Bohl 46'; R. Korte 54'; Washausen 66'	Attendance: 1,800

22 June 2011	Eintracht Braunschweig	2–0	SC Preußen Münster	Stadion am Salzgittersee, Salzgitter-Lebenstedt
18:30	Bohl 17'; R. Korte 77'			Attendance: 1,600

26 June 2011	FC Rot-Weiß Erfurt	0–4	Eintracht Braunschweig	Stadion der Freundschaft, Bad Langensalza
15:00			Fetsch 20', 50'; Petersch 39'; Zimmermann 86'	Attendance: 1,100

1 July 2011	FSV Mainz 05	1–0	Eintracht Braunschweig	Georg-Gaßmann-Stadion, Marburg
18:00	Heller 84'			Attendance: 1,000

3 July 2011	Braunschweiger SC Acosta	2–6	Eintracht Braunschweig	Konrad-Koch-Stadion, Braunschweig
15:00	Buhe 45'; Steinhauer 81'		R. Korte 57', 70'; Kumbela 5'; Fetsch 17'; G. Korte 21'; Merkel 66'	Attendance: 2,400

8 July 2011	Eintracht Braunschweig	3–0	VfL Osnabrück	Eintracht-Stadion, Braunschweig
18:30	Fischer 51' (o.g.); Vrančić 82'; G. Korte 88'			Attendance: 6,200

26 July 2011	VfB Germania Halberstadt	1–1	Eintracht Braunschweig	Friedensstadion, Halberstadt
18:00	Beck 73'		Unger 51'	Attendance: 640

30 August 2011	FT Braunschweig	0–7	Eintracht Braunschweig	Prinzenparkstadion, Braunschweig
18:15			Zimmermann 11'; Fuchs 15'; Fetsch 20', 83'; Petersch 34'; R. Korte 54'; G. Korte 75'	Attendance: 700

2 September 2011	SV Waldhof Mannheim	1–5	Eintracht Braunschweig	Carl-Benz-Stadion, Mannheim
18:30	Reule 18'		Pfitzner 17'; Kumbela 20'; Fetsch 72'; Fuchs 85'; Petersch 88'	Attendance: 1,145

7 October 2011	Eintracht Braunschweig	3–2	Holstein Kiel	Konrad-Koch-Stadion, Braunschweig
16:00	Kumbela 25', 72', 82'		Siedschlag 40'; Heider 42'	Attendance: 400

25 October 2011	MTV Gifhorn	1–5	Eintracht Braunschweig	GWG-Arena, Gifhorn
19:00	Hernier 20'		Edwini-Bonsu 6', 14'; Bohl 26'; Fetsch 32'; Petersch 69'	Attendance: 400

11 November 2011	Eintracht Braunschweig	2–1	SV Werder Bremen	Eintracht-Stadion, Braunschweig
18:00	Edwini-Bonsu 25', 34'		Wagner 40'	Attendance: 8,700

7 January 2012	1. FC Magdeburg	2–3	Eintracht Braunschweig	Heinrich-Germer-Stadion, Magdeburg
14:00	Wolf 1', 20'		R. Korte 11'; Kumbela 82'; Zimmermann 89'	Attendance: 800

14 January 2012	Eintracht Braunschweig	1–0	(Spain) Spanish Players' Association XI	Oliva, Spain
15:30	Pfitzner 45' (pen.)

18 January 2012	Eintracht Braunschweig	2–0	(Poland) Wisła Kraków	Oliva, Spain
15:00	Doğan 7'; Theuerkauf 69'

27 January 2012	KSV Hessen Kassel	2–2	Eintracht Braunschweig	Auestadion, Kassel
18:30	Gaede 9'; Mayer 19'		Boland 75'; Kodes 87'	Attendance: 500

29 January 2012	Hallescher FC	1–2	Eintracht Braunschweig	Erdgas Sportpark, Halle, Saxony-Anhalt
13:30	Wagefeld 49' (pen.)		Vrančić 45'; Kumbela 66'	Attendance: 1,362

8 May 2012	TSV Schöppenstedt	0–14	Eintracht Braunschweig	A-Platz, Schöppenstedt
18:00			Reinhardt 8'; Edwini-Bonsu 12'; Vrančić 15'; Unger 32', 38'; Nika 54', 66', 78'; Kumbela 58'; R. Korte 60'; G. Korte 69', 82', 90'; Fetsch 88'	Attendance: 2,000

11 May 2012	FSV Fuhsetal	1–17	Eintracht Braunschweig	A-Platz, Groß Flöthe
18:00	Ozdoev 84'		Pfitzner 11'; Merkel 15'; Zimmermann 33', 65', 71', 75'; Edwini-Bonsu 34', 52', 77'; Theuerkauf 36'; Reichel 49', 81'; Bičakčić 51'; R. Korte 59', 62'; Fetsch 82'; Reinhardt 90'	Attendance: 1,350

13 May 2012	SV Meinersen-Ahnsen-Päse	0–15	Eintracht Braunschweig	Pappelstadion, Meinersen
18:00			Kumbela 11'; Fuchs 18'; Zimmermann 24', 37'; Reinhardt 25'; Merkel 42'; Vrančić 53'; Edwini-Bonsu 54', 69', 72', 78'; G. Korte 75'; Pfitzner 76'; Theuerkauf 87'; R. Korte 88'	Attendance: 1,140

== Players ==
=== Current squad ===
As of 7 May 2012

Squad Season 2011–12
No.	Player	Nat.	Birthday	at BTSV since	previous club	League matches	League goals	Cup matches	Cup goals
Goalkeepers
1	Marjan Petković	German	22 May 1979	2009	FSV Frankfurt	5	0	1	0
26	Daniel Davari	German	6 Jan 1988	2009	FSV Mainz 05 II	29	0	0	0
30	Benjamin Later	German	30 Aug 1986	2011	Youth system	0	0	0	0
Defenders
3	Ermin Bičakčić	German	24 Jan 1990	01/12	VfB Stuttgart	15	1	0	0
4	Matthias Henn	German	28 Apr 1985	2007	1. FC Kaiserslautern	13	0	1	0
5	Benjamin Kessel	German	1 Oct 1987	2010	FSV Mainz 05 II	14	0	1	0
7	Benjamin Fuchs	Austrian	20 Oct 1983	2007	SV Wehen Wiesbaden	12	0	0	0
8	Deniz Doğan	Turk	20 Oct 1979	2007	VfB Lübeck	23	0	0	0
15	Norman Theuerkauf	German	24 Jan 1987	2009	Eintracht Frankfurt II	28	2	1	0
16	Emre Turan	Turk	16 Nov 1990	01/11	Ankaraspor	1	0	0	0
19	Ken Reichel	German	19 Dec 1986	2007	Hamburger SV II	33	0	0	0
24	Pascal Gos	German	15 Aug 1991	2010	Youth system	0	0	0	0
25	Marcel Correia	Portuguese	16 May 1989	2011	1. FC Kaiserslautern II	19	1	1	0
Midfielders
6	Damir Vrančić	Bosnian	4 Oct 1985	2009	Borussia Dortmund II	30	3	0	0
10	Mirko Boland	German	23 Apr 1987	01/09	MSV Duisburg II	32	2	1	0
11	Steffen Bohl	German	28 Dec 1983	01/11	SV Wehen Wiesbaden	4	0	1	0
13	Raffael Korte	German	29 Aug 1990	2011	TuS Mechtersheim	11	1	0	0
14	Jan Washausen	German	2 Oct 1988	2007	Youth system	17	0	0	0
17	Markus Unger	German	18 Nov 1981	2010	Hessen Kassel	4	0	0	0
18	Oliver Petersch	German	26 Apr 1989	2011	Rot-Weiß Oberhausen	14	0	0	0
20	Nico Zimmermann	German	2 Sep 1985	2011	1. FC Saarbrücken	22	2	1	0
23	Julius Reinhardt	German	29 Mar 1988	2010	Chemnitzer FC	17	0	0	0
31	Marc Pfitzner	German	28 Aug 1984	2007	Youth system	28	2	1	0
Strikers
9	Mathias Fetsch	German	30 Sep 1988	2010	TSV 1860 München II	15	0	1	0
12	Dominick Kumbela	Congolese	20 Apr 1984	01/10	Rot Weiss Ahlen	32	10	1	0
21	Pierre Merkel	German	25 May 1989	2011	SC Idar-Oberstein	10	2	0	0
22	Randy Edwini-Bonsu	Canadian	20 Apr 1990	01/12	AC Oulu	8	0	0	0
27	Gianluca Korte	German	29 Aug 1990	2011	TuS Mechtersheim	4	0	0	0
32	Dennis Kruppke (captain)	German	1 Apr 1980	01/08	SC Freiburg	32	10	1	0
Last updated: 7 May 2012

=== Transfers ===
In:

No.	Pos.	Nation	Player
3	DF	GER	Ermin Bičakčić (from VfB Stuttgart)
25	DF	POR	Marcel Correia (from 1. FC Kaiserslautern II)
22	FW	CAN	Randy Edwini-Bonsu (from AC Oulu)
27	FW	GER	Gianluca Korte (from TuS Mechtersheim)
13	MF	GER	Raffael Korte (from TuS Mechtersheim)
36	GK	GER	Benjamin Later (from Youth system)
21	FW	GER	Pierre Merkel (from SC Idar-Oberstein)
18	MF	GER	Oliver Petersch (from Bayer 04 Leverkusen)
20	MF	GER	Nico Zimmermann (from 1. FC Saarbrücken)

Out:

No.	Pos.	Nation	Player
21	MF	GER	Patrick Amrhein (to SpVgg Unterhaching)
38	FW	GER	Karim Bellarabi (to Bayer 04 Leverkusen)
18	FW	GER	Marco Calamita (to VfR Aalen)
27	MF	GER	Oliver Kragl (to VfB Germania Halberstadt)
20	MF	GER	Dennis Lemke (to FC Carl Zeiss Jena)

== Management and coaching staff ==
Since 12 May 2008 Torsten Lieberknecht is the manager of Eintracht Braunschweig.

Position	Staff
Manager	Torsten Lieberknecht
Assistant manager	Darius Scholtysik
Assistant manager/athletic trainer	Jürgen Rische
Goalkeeping coach	Alexander Kunze
Sporting director	Marc Arnold
Club doctor	Dr. Frank Maier
Physiotherapist	Sascha Weiß
Physiotherapist	Caroline Schweibs
Team manager	Holm Stelzer
Kit and equipment manager/Bus driver	Christian Skolik
