= Randy Edwini-Bonsu =

Canadian soccer player (born 1990)

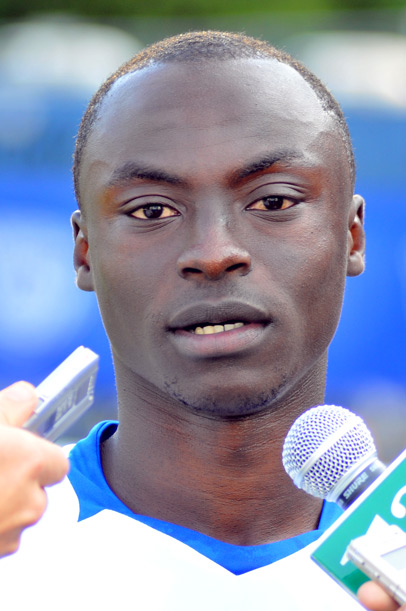
- Edwini-Bonsu with the Vancouver Whitecaps in 2009

Personal information
- Full name: Randy Edwini-Bonsu
- Date of birth: April 20, 1990 (age 36)
- Place of birth: Kumasi, Ghana
- Height: 1.65 m (5 ft 5 in)
- Position: Forward

Youth career
- Edmonton Green & Gold
- 2007: Metz
- 2007: Vancouver Whitecaps

Senior career*
Years	Team	Apps	(Gls)
2008–2010	Vancouver Whitecaps	32	(2)
2008–2010	Whitecaps Residency	26	(11)
2011	AC Oulu	20	(16)
2011–2013	Eintracht Braunschweig	16	(0)
2012–2013	Eintracht Braunschweig II	5	(1)
2014–2015	Stuttgarter Kickers	52	(7)
2015–2016	VfR Aalen	11	(0)
2016–2017	FC Homburg	20	(0)
2017–2018	Tennis Borussia Berlin	23	(6)
2019	FC Edmonton	12	(0)

International career^{‡}
2006–2007	Canada U17	15	(2)
2008–2009	Canada U20	5	(3)
2012	Canada U23	2	(0)
2010–2015	Canada	10	(1)
- * Club domestic league appearances and goals as of 2 September 2019 ‡ National team caps and goals as of 11 June 2015

Randy Edwini-Bonsu (born April 20, 1990) is a soccer player who last played for FC Edmonton in the Canadian Premier League. Born in Ghana, he played for the Canada national team.

== Club career ==
=== Early career ===
Edwini-Bonsu started playing soccer when his family immigrated from Ghana to Edmonton, Alberta in 2002, and he grew up in the city. He joined his first club at the age of fourteen. He played club soccer for the Green & Gold Soccer Club at the University of Alberta in Edmonton and, from 2004 and 2006, was a member of the Alberta provincial team, leading his province to a gold medal victory at the 2006 Canadian All-Star Championship.

At club level, Edwini-Bonsu played for Southwest United of the Edmonton Interdistrict Youth Soccer Association (EIYSA) between 2003 and 2006, and in his last year with the club he took Southwest United U-16's to an Alberta provincial title and a second-place finish at Canadian Club Championship in Moncton, New Brunswick.

In 2007, he trained with the U-18 and reserve sides of French club FC Metz.

=== Vancouver Whitecaps ===
Later in 2007 he signed with the youth academy of USL First Division side Vancouver Whitecaps. He played for Whitecaps' development team, Vancouver Whitecaps Residency, in the USL Premier Development League, helping the team to the Conference Finals in its inaugural season, scoring nine goals in 15 games along the way.

Following the conclusion of the 2008 PDL season, Edwini-Bonsu was called up to the senior Vancouver Whitecaps team, and made his professional debut on August 20, 2008, in a 0–0 tie with the Seattle Sounders.

=== AC Oulu ===
In 2011, Edwini-Bonsu played for Finnish second tier Ykkönen side AC Oulu. He was named the Ykkönen Player of the Month in September 2011.

=== Eintracht Braunschweig ===
On November 22, 2011, it was announced that Edwini-Bonsu had signed a contract with Eintracht Braunschweig through June 2013, after impressing in two friendlies while on trial, scoring a total of four goals. Edwini-Bonsu made his debut in Germany on February 5, 2012, in a 2–1 defeat to Eintracht Frankfurt, he came on as a second half sub for Mathias Fetsch.

On March 4, 2012, Edwini-Bonsu made his home debut in a league game for Eintracht Braunschweig as a sub for Damir Vrančić (32nd minute). This substitution set the basics for Eintracht beating Hansa Rostock 3–2: Edwini-Bonsu initiated an attack that led to Braunschweig's second goal. In minute 79, Edwini-Bonsu was fouled which led to the final result by a directly converted free-kick from Nico Zimmermann.

His good performance in this match got confirmed by Eintracht Braunschweig's fans who have voted him as the "Player of the Day". However, subsequently Edwini-Bonsu could not establish himself as a regular at the club, and his contract was not renewed at the end of the 2012–13 season.

=== Stuttgarter Kickers ===
After six months without a club, he signed for 3. Liga side Stuttgarter Kickers in January 2014.

=== VfR Aalen ===
After his contract had not been renewed, he moved to fellow leaguer VfR Aalen on June 30, 2015, signing a contract until 2017.

=== FC Edmonton ===
In November 2018, Edwini-Bonsu signed with Canadian Premier League club FC Edmonton. He made his debut for Edmonton on May 4 against Valour FC. On November 4, Edmonton announced Edwini-Bonsu would be leaving the club. He was regarded to have failed to establish himself as a regular starter while playing for them.

== International career ==
=== Youth ===
On November 12, 2008, he was called to a Canada U-20 training camp in Switzerland. Edwini-Bonsu represented Canada at the 2007 CONCACAF U17 Tournament in Kingston, Jamaica; Canada finished fourth in Group B. Edwini-Bonsu was later called up to a U-20 camp for Canada in November 2008 which included an exhibition match against U-21 from Young Boys Bern on November 24 in Bern and then an international friendly match against Switzerland on November 26, 2008, in Solothurn. He tied for the goal-scoring lead with three goals in three games at the 2009 CONCACAF U-20 Championship even though Canada didn't advance past the group stage. In January 2010, he was called up for the U-23 of Canada alongside his teammate Philippe Davies.

=== Senior ===
On January 31, 2010, he earned his first cap for the Canada national men's soccer team in a friendly match against Jamaica. Edwini-Bonsu didn't return to Canada's senior team until March 22, 2013, when he received his second cap in a friendly against Japan. On June 27, 2013, Edwini-Bonsu was listed as a part of the confirmed 23-man squad for Colin Miller's Canada squad for 2013 CONCACAF Gold Cup. Edwini-Bonsu scored his first goal for Canada in a friendly against Puerto Rico on March 30, 2015.

== Career statistics ==
=== Club ===
As of 5 November 2019

Club statistics
Club	Season	League			National Cup (Note: Includes appearances in the Canadian Championship and DFB-Pokal.)		League Cup		Continental		Other (Note: Includes appearances in the USL First Division Playoffs and USSF Division 2 Playoffs.)		Total	
Club	Season	Division	Apps	Goals	Apps	Goals	Apps	Goals	Apps	Goals	Apps	Goals	Apps	Goals
Vancouver Whitecaps	2008	USL First Division	4	0	0	0	—		—		0	0	4	0
Vancouver Whitecaps	2009	USL First Division	10	0	0	0	—		—		5	1	15	1
Vancouver Whitecaps	2010	USSF Division 2	18	2	3	0	—		—		1	0	22	2
Vancouver Whitecaps	Total		32	2	3	0	0	0	0	0	6	1	41	4
AC Oulu	2011	Ykkönen	20	16	0	0	0	0	—		0	0	20	16
Eintracht Braunschweig	2011–12	2. Bundesliga	8	0	0	0	—		—		0	0	8	0
Eintracht Braunschweig	2012–13	2. Bundesliga	8	0	1	0	—		—		0	0	9	0
Eintracht Braunschweig	Total		16	0	1	0	0	0	0	0	0	0	17	0
Eintracht Braunschweig II	2012–13	Oberliga Niedersachsen	5	1	—		—		—		0	0	5	1
Stuttgarter Kickers	2013–14	3. Liga	17	2	0	0	—		—		0	0	17	2
Stuttgarter Kickers	2014–15	3. Liga	35	5	1	0	—		—		0	0	36	5
Stuttgarter Kickers	Total		52	7	1	0	0	0	0	0	0	0	53	7
VfR Aalen	2015–16	3. Liga	11	0	0	0	—		—		0	0	11	0
FC Homburg	2016–17	Regionalliga Südwest	20	0	1	0	—		—		0	0	21	0
Tennis Borussia Berlin	2017–18	NOFV-Oberliga	23	6	0	0	—		—		0	0	23	6
FC Edmonton	2019	Canadian Premier League	12	0	2	0	—		—		0	0	14	0
Career total			191	32	8	0	0	0	0	0	6	1	205	33

=== International ===
As of 19 January 2019

Canada national team
Year	Apps	Goals
2010	1	0
2011	0	0
2012	0	0
2013	3	0
2014	3	0
2015	3	1
Total	10	1

=== International goals ===
Scores and results list Canada's goal tally first.

#	Date	Venue	Opponent	Score	Result	Competition
1	30 March 2015	Estadio Juan Ramón Loubriel, Bayamon, Puerto Rico	Puerto Rico	2–0	3–0	Friendly
