= Gianluca Korte =

German footballer

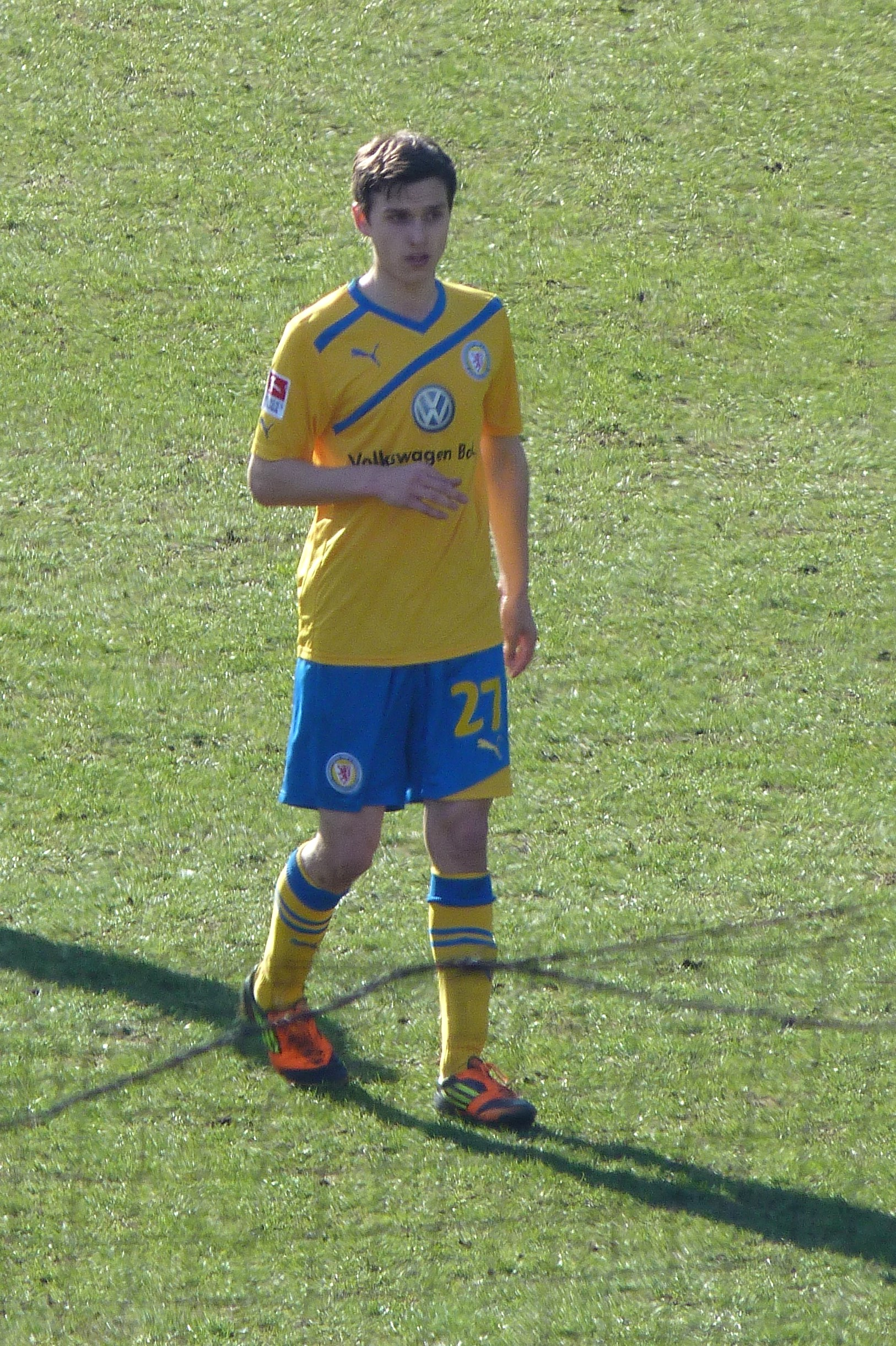
- Korte with Eintracht Braunschweig in February 2012

Personal information
- Date of birth: 29 August 1990 (age 36)
- Place of birth: Speyer, West Germany
- Height: 1.77 m (5 ft 10 in)
- Position: Midfielder

Team information
- Current team: VfR Mannheim

Youth career
- –2009: Phönix Schifferstadt

Senior career*
Years	Team	Apps	(Gls)
2009–2011	TuS Mechtersheim	61	(22)
2011–2015	Eintracht Braunschweig	17	(2)
2011–2014	→ Eintracht Braunschweig II	30	(13)
2015	→ VfR Aalen (loan)	3	(0)
2016–2020	Waldhof Mannheim	134	(33)
2020–2022	SV Wehen Wiesbaden	34	(5)
2022–2024	TSV Steinbach	31	(2)
2024–	VfR Mannheim	0	(0)
- * Club domestic league appearances and goals as of 18 May 2024

Gianluca Korte (born 29 August 1990) is a German professional footballer who plays as a midfielder for VfR Mannheim.

== Career ==
Korte was born in Speyer. He joined 2. Bundesliga club Eintracht Braunschweig in 2011 from Oberliga Südwest side TuS Mechtersheim. There he made his professional debut on 12 August 2011, in a 3–1 away win over Karlsruher SC. With Braunschweig, Korte was promoted to the Bundesliga in 2013. He made his debut in the first tier on 30 November 2013 against FC Bayern Munich.

In January 2015, Korte joined VfR Aalen on a six-months loan deal. At the end of the 2014–15 2. Bundesliga season, his contract with Braunschweig was terminated by mutual consent.

After having been without a club for six months, Korte signed with Regionalliga Südwest club SV Waldhof Mannheim on 11 January 2016.

== Personal life ==
Korte is the identical twin brother of Raffael Korte, also a professional footballer.
