= Gaede =

Gaede may refer to:

- Bill Gaede (born 1952), Argentine engineer, programmer and Cold War industrial spy
- Enrico Gaede (born 1982), German footballer
- Heinrich Moritz Gaede (1795−1834), German naturalist and entomologist
- Hans Gaede (1852-1916), German World War I general
- Kevin Gaede (born 1959), known as Kevin Gage, American actor
- Max Gaede (1871–1946), German entomologist and engineer
- Wolfgang Gaede (1878–1945), German physicist and pioneer of vacuum engineering

Gaede may also refer to:

- 14224 Gaede, main-belt asteroid
