= Raffael Korte =

German footballer

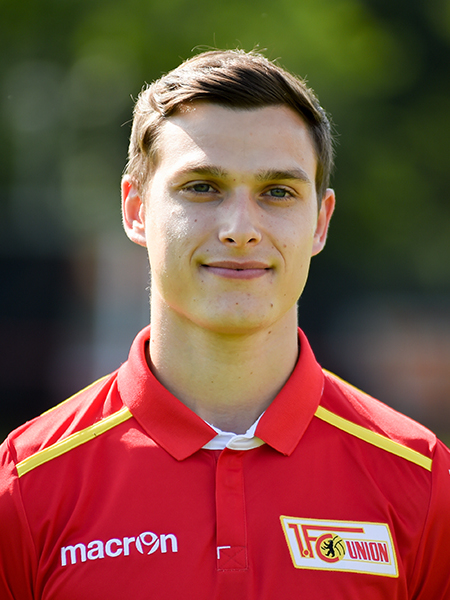
- Korte in 2016

Personal information
- Date of birth: 29 August 1990 (age 36)
- Place of birth: Speyer, West Germany
- Height: 1.75 m (5 ft 9 in)
- Position: Midfielder

Youth career
- –2009: Phönix Schifferstadt

Senior career*
Years	Team	Apps	(Gls)
2009–2011	TuS Mechtersheim	54	(19)
2011–2015	Eintracht Braunschweig	38	(2)
2011–2013	→ Eintracht Braunschweig II	20	(5)
2013–2014	→ 1. FC Saarbrücken (loan)	34	(5)
2015–2017	Union Berlin	10	(0)
2017–2020	Waldhof Mannheim	23	(5)
Total		179	(36)
- * Club domestic league appearances and goals

Raffael Korte (born 29 August 1990) is a German former professional footballer who played as a midfielder.

== Career ==
Korte was born in Speyer. He joined 2. Bundesliga club Eintracht Braunschweig in 2011 from Oberliga Südwest side TuS Mechtersheim. After two seasons in Braunschweig, he was loaned to 1. FC Saarbrücken in the 3. Liga for the 2013–14 season. After the 2014–15 2. Bundesliga season, Korte joined Union Berlin on a free transfer.

Korte retired in summer 2020 after recurring knee problems which required four surgeries.

== Personal life ==
Korte is the identical twin brother of Gianluca Korte, also a professional footballer.
