= Jan Washausen =

German footballer

Personal information
- Date of birth: 12 October 1988 (age 38)
- Place of birth: Göttingen, West Germany
- Height: 1.85 m (6 ft 1 in)
- Positions: Defender; midfielder

Team information
- Current team: New York International

Youth career
- Nikolausberger SC
- Göttingen 05
- –2006: SCW Göttingen
- 2006–2007: Eintracht Braunschweig

Senior career*
Years	Team	Apps	(Gls)
2007–2015	Eintracht Braunschweig	72	(1)
2007–2015	Eintracht Braunschweig II	46	(3)
2013	→ Kickers Offenbach (loan)	14	(0)
2015–2018	SV Elversberg	75	(4)
2018	FSV Zwickau	13	(1)
2018–2020	Hallescher FC	48	(1)
2021	SpVgg Bayreuth	0	(0)
2021	Par Neu-Isenberg	5	(0)
2022–	New York International FC		
- * Club domestic league appearances and goals as of 14 April 2022

Jan Washausen (born 12 October 1988) is a German professional footballer who plays as a defender or midfielder for New York International in the Cosmopolitan Soccer League.

== Career ==
Washausen, made his debut in senior football in 2007 for Eintracht Braunschweig, in a first round match of the DFB-Pokal against Werder Bremen. He was used mostly as a back-up in Braunschweig, making 72 appearances in eight seasons for the club. In January 2013 Washausen went out on a six-month loan to Kickers Offenbach. After returning from his loan spell, he made his Bundesliga debut for newly promoted Eintracht Braunschweig on 19 October 2013, in a home game against Schalke 04.

In 2015, Washausen joined Regionalliga Südwest side SV Elversberg.

Washausen joined American amateur club New York International FC on 14 April 2022.
