= Oliver Peters =

Oliver Peters may refer to:

- Oliver Peters, character in 12 Monkeys (TV series)
- Oliver Peters, character in Operation Diplomat (film)

== See also ==
- Oliver Petersch, footballer
