= Angola–Germany relations =

Bilateral relations

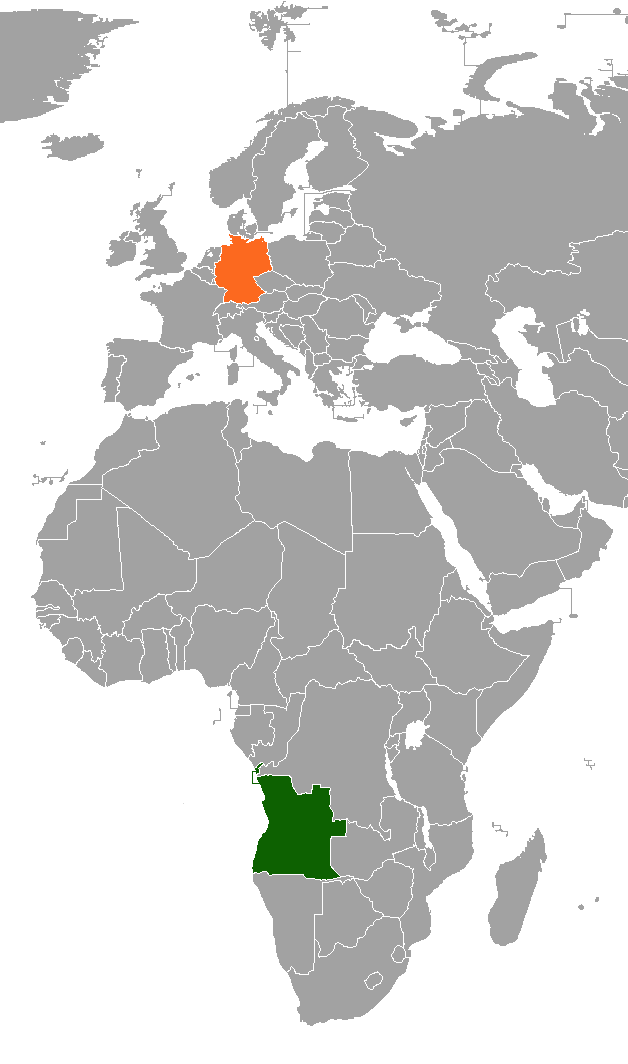

- Angola: Germany

Angola–Germany relations are the bilateral relations between Angola and Germany. Angola has an embassy in Berlin and Germany has an embassy in Luanda.

Angola was Germany's third most important trading partner in sub-Saharan Africa in 2011.

== History ==
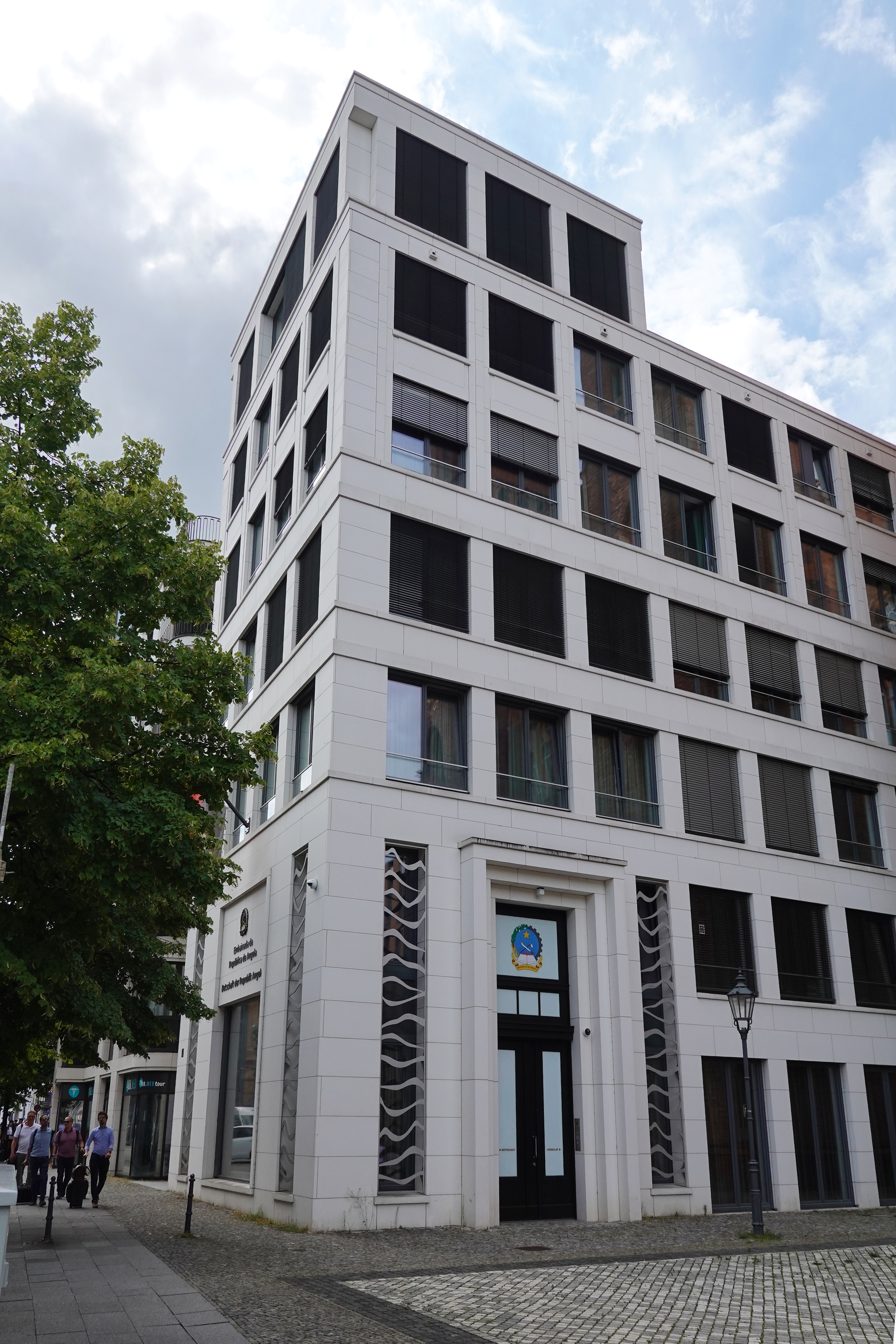
Embassy of Angola in Berlin

Angola had already been a Portuguese colony since 1483, when the German Empire took possession of the southern bordering area as German South West Africa in 1884. When World War I broke out in August 1914, Portugal was initially still neutral and only received a declaration of war from Germany in 1916. As early as December 18, 1914, however, the battle for Naulila occurred in southern Angola, as the culmination of the German Schutztruppe's punitive expedition against Portuguese West Africa (Angola). This was triggered by the deaths of several German officers and officials who had previously been picked up and escorted by Portuguese military on Angolan territory, dying in the exchange of fire after a series of misunderstandings.

With the end of the German colony of German South West Africa in 1915, over 1,400 Germans emigrated to Angola, mostly working as farmers. These Angola Germans lived mainly in the Benguela region, where there was a German school for a time, and other regions in southern Angola.

After independence and the outbreak of the Angolan Civil War in 1975, most Angola Germans left the country.

At the same time, relations between the People's Republic of Angola and the German Democratic Republic (GDR) developed amicably until the end of the GDR in 1989. Several thousand contract workers and students from Angola came to the GDR in the process. About 20% of Angola's current leaders in business and politics studied in the GDR.

After the end of the GDR in 1990, the case of Amadeu Antonio, an Angolan murdered by neo-Nazis in Eberswalde, caused an international outcry. Angolans were repeatedly among the victims of the numerous xenophobic attacks that followed.

With the enormous economic development after the end of the Angolan civil war in 2002, German attention for the country then increased again. In 2011, Chancellor Angela Merkel became the first German head of government to visit Angola. The arms deals that were also agreed upon during this visit caused discussion in German politics.

The chancellor came to Angola a second time in February 2020, where she spoke with Angolan President João Lourenço about, among other things, the delivery of coast guard boats to the Angolan Armed Forces Navy. An aviation agreement and economic and training agreements were also concluded.

== High level visits ==
Angola's former President José Eduardo dos Santos visited Germany twice, in 1981 (GDR) and in 2009. Chancellor Angela Merkel was the first German head of state to visit Angola in 2011, and she came there for a second time in February 2020.

== Economic relations ==
With the economic upswing after the end of the civil war in 2002, economic relations between Angola and Germany also increased significantly. Angola is now Germany's third most important trading partner in sub-Saharan Africa. Critics criticize the lack of attention paid to corruption and the problematic human rights situation in Angola when it comes to the role of German lenders and arms exports.

Some 20 German companies now have their own subsidiaries in Angola, including Bauer, Bosch, Commerzbank, DHL, Siemens, and Volkswagen. Germany's Krones AG is even virtually unrivaled in the Angolan market for beverage filling equipment, with a 90% share of the market.

In 2021, Germany exported 149 million euros worth of goods to Angola and in return imported 3 million euros worth of goods from the country.

== Sports ==
Angolan football player Miguel Pereira (* 1975) played for FC Schalke 04 at the age of 18 and has since been active as a player and coach in Germany. Nando Rafael (* 1984), Narciso Lubasa (* 1989), Joe Vunguidica (* 1990) and Danny da Costa (* 1993) are other German-Angolan football players.
