= Daniel Davari =

Iranian footballer (born 1988)

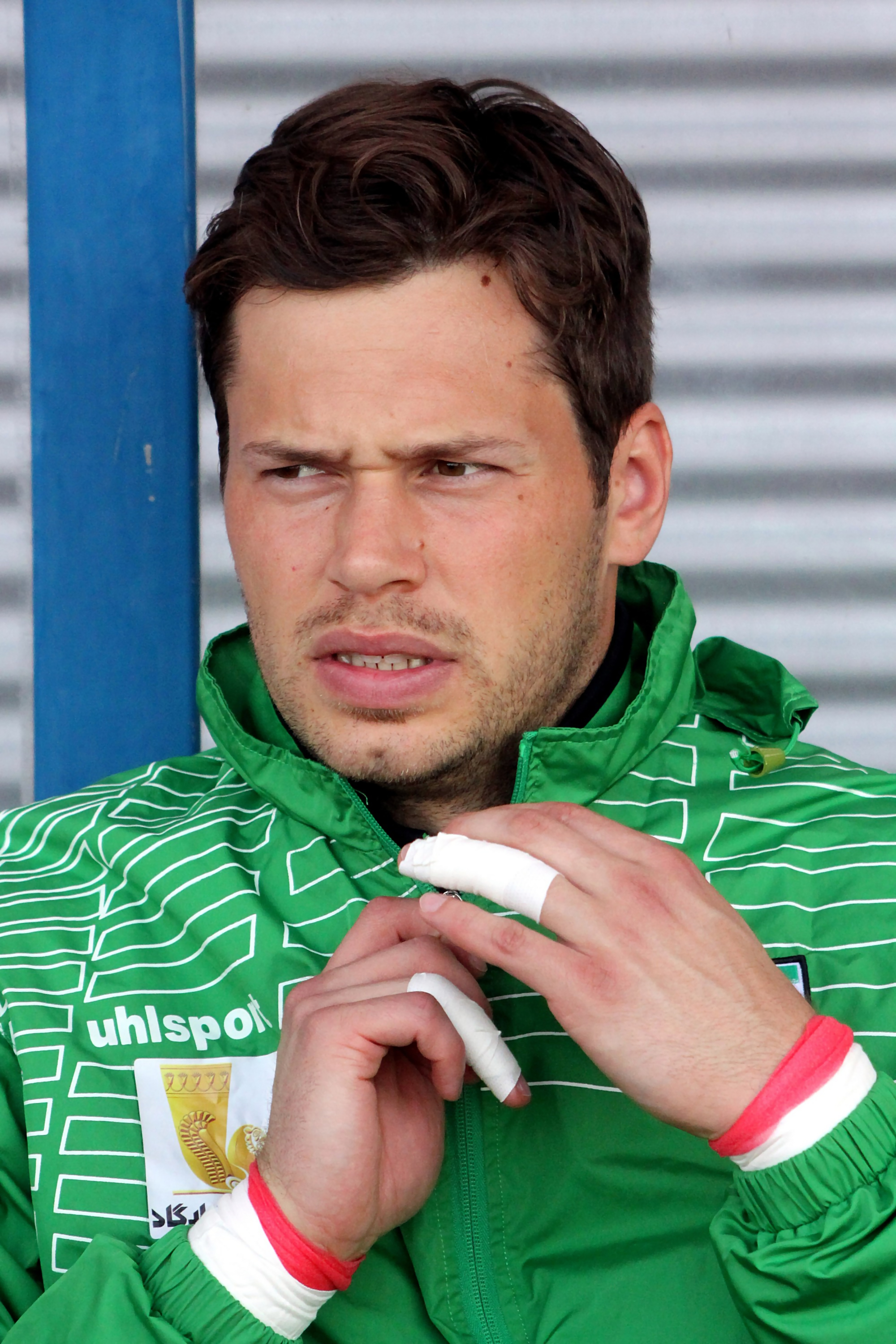
- Davari with Iran in 2014

Personal information
- Full name: Daniel Davari; Mohammad Davari
- Date of birth: 6 January 1988 (age 38)
- Place of birth: Gießen, West Germany
- Height: 1.92 m (6 ft 4 in)
- Position: Goalkeeper

Youth career
- 1994–2002: SV Garbenteich
- 2002–2004: TSG Wieseck
- 2004–2007: Mainz 05

Senior career*
Years	Team	Apps	(Gls)
2007–2009	Mainz 05 II	32	(0)
2009–2011	Eintracht Braunschweig II	12	(0)
2009–2014	Eintracht Braunschweig	92	(0)
2014–2015	Grasshoppers	10	(0)
2015–2017	Arminia Bielefeld	9	(0)
2017–2019	MSV Duisburg	7	(0)
2019–2020	Rot-Weiß Oberhausen	36	(0)
2020–2022	Rot-Weiss Essen	67	(0)
2022–2025	Rot-Weiß Oberhausen	28	(0)
Total		293	(0)

International career
2013–2014	Iran	4	(0)

Managerial career
- 2025–: VfL Osnabrück (goalkeeping coach)
- * Club domestic league appearances and goals

Daniel Davari (Persian: دانیال داوری; born 6 January 1988), known as Mohammad Davari in Iran, is a former professional footballer. He last played as a goalkeeper for Rot-Weiß Oberhausen. Born in Germany, he represented the Iran national team.

== Club career ==
=== Eintracht Braunschweig ===
Davari began his career with the reserve side of 1. FSV Mainz 05, before moving to Eintracht Braunschweig in 2009. Originally the club's back-up keeper, he became a starter for Eintracht Braunschweig when Marjan Petković had an injury early during the 2011–12 season. Although Petković returned from his injury a few weeks later, Davari kept the starting spot for the rest of the season, eventually leading Braunschweig to reach promotion to the Bundesliga.

On 13 August 2013, Davari played his first Bundesliga match against Borussia Dortmund in the 2013–14 Bundesliga season and earned a 1 rating from Kicker (based on a scale of 1 to 6, with 1 being the highest). Davari was voted the best Braunschweig player at the midpoint of the Bundesliga season. He was named the man of the match against Freiburg on 12 April 2014. On 10 May, Davari provided an assist to Jan Hochscheidt against Hoffenheim.

Davari alone had five world class saves. Iran can be very happy about a quality national team goalkeeper.

— Borussia Dortmund manager Jürgen Klopp on Davari, 31 January 2014.

=== Grasshoppers ===
On 29 May 2014, Davari signed a contract with Swiss Super League side Grasshopper Club Zürich, joining the club on 1 July after the 2014 FIFA World Cup. On 30 July, he made his Champions League debut against Lille.

=== Arminia Bielefeld ===
On 11 June 2015, Davari joined Arminia Bielefeld in the German 2.Bundesliga on a two-year deal. He made his debut on 8 May 2016 and kept a clean sheet in a match against Union Berlin.

Davari kept a clean sheet on 17 March 2017 in a 2–0 win against Kaiserslautern to lift Arminia out of a direct relegation spot.

=== MSV Duisburg ===
He signed for MSV Duisburg for the 2017–18 season.

=== Rot-Weiß Oberhausen ===
On 26 January 2019, he moved to Rot-Weiß Oberhausen.

On 17 May 2025, he played his last professionel match.

== International career ==
On 21 January 2013, it was confirmed that Daniel Davari was invited to the Iran national team by manager Carlos Queiroz. Davari, who was born in Gießen, Germany to a Polish-German mother and an Iranian father, is eligible to play for Germany, Poland and Iran. However, Davari declined Iran's invitation for the Asian Cup qualifier against Lebanon as the date coincided with a crucial club match, stating that he would accept an invitation for Iran's next match.

Davari made his debut for Team Melli against Thailand on 15 November, keeping a clean sheet in a 3–0 Asian Cup qualifier win. On 1 June 2014, Davari was called into Iran's 2014 FIFA World Cup squad by Carlos Queiroz. He was an unused substitute with Alireza Haghighi starting all three matches for Iran.

== Post-playing career ==
Davari began his career off the field as a goalkeeping coach for VfL Osnabrück.

== Personal life ==
Daniel Davari was brought up as a Catholic from an Iranian father and a Polish mother. Davari was given the name Mohammad Davari on his Iranian passport. On 28 September 2014, Davari's wife Kristina gave birth to a son named Eliah.

== Career statistics ==
Appearances and goals by club, season and competition
Club	Season	League			Cup		Continental		Total	
Club	Season	Division	Apps	Goals	Apps	Goals	Apps	Goals	Apps	Goals
Mainz 05 II	2007–08	Oberliga Rheinland-Pfalz/Saar	8	0	0	0	—		8	0
Mainz 05 II	2008–09	Oberliga Rheinland-Pfalz/Saar	24	0	0	0	—		24	0
Mainz 05 II	Total		32	0	0	0	—		32	0
Eintracht Braunschweig II	2009–10	Niedersachsenliga	4	0	0	0	—		4	0
Eintracht Braunschweig II	2010–11	Regionalliga Nord	8	0	0	0	—		8	0
Eintracht Braunschweig II	Total		12	0	0	0	—		12	0
Eintracht Braunschweig	2009–10	3. Liga	0	0	0	0	—		0	0
Eintracht Braunschweig	2010–11	3. Liga	4	0	0	0	—		4	0
Eintracht Braunschweig	2011–12	2. Bundesliga	29	0	0	0	—		29	0
Eintracht Braunschweig	2012–13	2. Bundesliga	30	0	0	0	—		30	0
Eintracht Braunschweig	2013–14	Bundesliga	29	0	0	0	—		29	0
Eintracht Braunschweig	Total		92	0	0	0	—		92	0
Grasshoppers	2014–15	Swiss Super League	10	0	3	0	2	0	15	0
Arminia Bielefeld	2015–16	2. Bundesliga	1	0	0	0	—		1	0
Arminia Bielefeld	2016–17	2. Bundesliga	8	0	0	0	—		8	0
Arminia Bielefeld	Total		9	0	0	0	—		9	0
MSV Duisburg	2017–18	2. Bundesliga	3	0	0	0	—		3	0
MSV Duisburg	2018–19	2. Bundesliga	4	0	1	0	—		5	0
MSV Duisburg	Total		7	0	1	0	—		8	0
Rot-Weiß Oberhausen	2018–19	Regionalliga West	13	0	—		—		13	0
Rot-Weiß Oberhausen	2019–20	Regionalliga West	23	0	—		—		23	0
Rot-Weiß Oberhausen	Total		36	0	—		—		36	0
Rot-Weiss Essen	2020–21	Regionalliga West	38	0	4	0	—		42	0
Rot-Weiss Essen	2021–22	Regionalliga West	29	0	—		—		29	0
Rot-Weiss Essen	Total		67	0	4	0	—		71	0
Rot-Weiß Oberhausen	2022–23	Regionalliga West	27	0	—		—		27	0
Rot-Weiß Oberhausen	2023–24	Regionalliga West	0	0	—		—		0	0
Rot-Weiß Oberhausen	2024–25	Regionalliga West	1	0	—		—		1	0
Rot-Weiß Oberhausen	Total		28	0	—		—		28	0
Career total			293	0	8	0	2	0	303	0

== See also ==
- German-Iranians
