= Marcel Correia =

Portuguese footballer

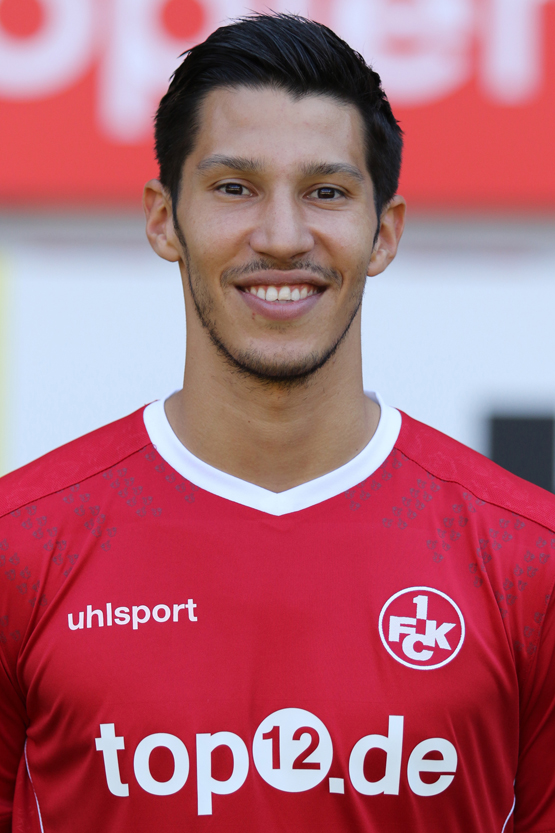
- Correia with 1. FC Kaiserslautern in 2017

Personal information
- Date of birth: 16 May 1989 (age 37)
- Place of birth: Kaiserslautern, West Germany
- Height: 1.86 m (6 ft 1 in)
- Position: Centre-back

Youth career
- 1995–2008: 1. FC Kaiserslautern

Senior career*
Years	Team	Apps	(Gls)
2008–2011	1. FC Kaiserslautern II	94	(4)
2009–2010	1. FC Kaiserslautern	0	(0)
2011–2017	Eintracht Braunschweig	113	(1)
2012–2016	→ Eintracht Braunschweig II	5	(0)
2017–2018	1. FC Kaiserslautern	11	(0)
2018–2020	Jahn Regensburg	60	(3)
2020–2022	SC Paderborn	23	(1)
2022–2024	SV Elversberg	33	(5)
- * Club domestic league appearances and goals as of 19 May 2024

Marcel Correia (born 16 May 1989) is a Portuguese professional footballer who plays as a centre back.

== Early life and career ==
Correia was born to Portuguese parents in Kaiserslautern, but does not hold German citizenship. In 1995, he joined the youth system of his hometown club 1. FC Kaiserslautern and was promoted to the club's reserve side in 2008.

In 2011, Correia transferred to 2. Bundesliga side Eintracht Braunschweig. At the end of the 2016–17 season and after two years of captaining the team, he was released by Braunschweig. In this time there, he made 19 Bundesliga and 94 2. Bundesliga appearances.

In June 2017, Correia returned to his boyhood club 1. FC Kaiserslautern, also of the 2. Bundesliga, signing a three-year contract. Due to Kaiserslautern's relegation to the 3. Liga at the end of the 2017–18 season, he became a free agent and joined SSV Jahn Regensburg.

For the 2022–23 season, Correia signed with SV Elversberg.

== Career statistics ==
As of 16 July 2020

Appearances and goals by club, season and competition
Club	Season	League			Cup (Note: Includes DFB-Pokal)		Other		Total	
Club	Season	Division	Apps	Goals	Apps	Goals	Apps	Goals	Apps	Goals
1. FC Kaiserslautern II	2008–09	Regionalliga West	18	0	—		—		18	0
1. FC Kaiserslautern II	2009–10	Regionalliga West	26	0	—		—		26	0
1. FC Kaiserslautern II	2010–11	Regionalliga West	28	1	—		—		28	1
1. FC Kaiserslautern II	Total		72	1	0	0	—		72	1
Eintracht Braunschweig	2011–12	2. Bundesliga	19	1	1	0	—		20	1
Eintracht Braunschweig	2012–13	2. Bundesliga	17	0	2	0	—		19	0
Eintracht Braunschweig	2013–14	Bundesliga	19	0	—		—		19	0
Eintracht Braunschweig	2014–15	2. Bundesliga	29	0	3	0	—		32	0
Eintracht Braunschweig	2015–16	2. Bundesliga	14	0	1	0	—		15	0
Eintracht Braunschweig	2016–17	2. Bundesliga	15	0	—		—		15	0
Eintracht Braunschweig	Total		113	1	7	0	—		120	1
1. FC Kaiserslautern	2017–18	2. Bundesliga	11	0	0	0	—		11	0
Jahn Regensburg	2018–19	2. Bundesliga	30	2	0	0	—		30	2
Jahn Regensburg	2019–20	2. Bundesliga	30	1	0	0	—		30	1
Jahn Regensburg	Total		60	3	0	0	—		60	3
Career total			255	5	7	0	—		262	5
