= Markus Unger =

German footballer (born 1981)

Personal information
- Date of birth: 18 November 1981 (age 44)
- Place of birth: Fulda, West Germany
- Height: 1.80 m (5 ft 11 in)
- Position: Midfielder

Youth career
- SV Steinhaus
- –1999: SC Borussia Fulda

Senior career*
| Years | Team | Apps | (Gls) |
| 1999–2004 | SC Borussia Fulda | 21 | (2) |
| 2004–2005 | 1. FC Schweinfurt 05 | | |
| 2005 | SV Buchonia Flieden | | |
| 2005–2006 | Kickers Emden | 24 | (3) |
| 2006–2008 | SSV Reutlingen | 46 | (6) |
| 2008 | Sportfreunde Siegen | 2 | (1) |
| 2008–2009 | Kickers Emden | 28 | (5) |
| 2009–2010 | KSV Hessen Kassel | 22 | (5) |
| 2010–2012 | Eintracht Braunschweig | 16 | (1) |
| 2010–2014 | Eintracht Braunschweig II | 46 | (20) |

Managerial career
- 2012–: Eintracht Braunschweig II (assistant)
- * Club domestic league appearances and goals

Markus Unger (born 18 November 1981) is a German former professional footballer who played as a midfielder.

== Career ==
Unger was born in Fulda. He spent his early career mostly as a journeyman in the third and fourth divisions of German football, most notably with Kickers Emden during the 2008–09 3. Liga season. In 2010, he joined Eintracht Braunschweig, where he helped the club to gain promotion back to the 2. Bundesliga. Unger went on to play the first 2. Bundesliga season of his career the next year, making four appearances. He retired from professional football in 2012, but will stay with the club both as a player and as assistant coach of Eintracht Braunschweig's reserve team. In 2014, Unger announced his retirement as a player, but stayed on as Eintracht Braunschweig II's assistant manager and as a coach at the club's youth academy.
