= Matthias Henn =

German footballer

Personal information
- Date of birth: 28 April 1985 (age 41)
- Place of birth: Birkenfeld, West Germany
- Height: 1.85 m (6 ft 1 in)
- Position: Defender

Youth career
- 1997–2002: SG Blaubach-Diedelkopf
- 2002–2004: 1. FC Kaiserslautern

Senior career*
| Years | Team | Apps | (Gls) |
| 2004–2007 | 1. FC Kaiserslautern II | 36 | (0) |
| 2004–2007 | 1. FC Kaiserslautern | 2 | (0) |
| 2007–2015 | Eintracht Braunschweig | 109 | (6) |
| 2007–2015 | → Eintracht Braunschweig II | 20 | (1) |
| 2015–2017 | Hansa Rostock | 66 | (2) |
| 2017–2018 | Teutonia Watzenborn-Steinberg | 19 | (3) |
| 2018–2019 | FC Gießen | 0 | (0) |
| Total | | 252 | (12) |
- * Club domestic league appearances and goals

Matthias Henn (born 28 April 1985) is a German former professional footballer who played as a defender.

He spent three seasons in the Bundesliga, one with Eintracht Braunschweig and two with 1. FC Kaiserslautern. After eight seasons in Braunschweig, Henn joined Hansa Rostock in 2015.
