= Mathias Fetsch =

German footballer (born 1988)

Personal information
- Date of birth: 30 September 1988 (age 38)
- Place of birth: Malsch, West Germany
- Height: 1.89 m (6 ft 2 in)
- Position: Striker

Team information
- Current team: Karlsruher SC II
- Number: 9

Youth career
- –1996: Bulacher SC
- 1996–2007: Karlsruher SC

Senior career*
Years	Team	Apps	(Gls)
2007–2008	Karlsruher SC II	42	(9)
2009	1860 Munich	2	(0)
2009–2010	1860 Munich II	46	(17)
2010–2012	Eintracht Braunschweig	45	(5)
2011–2012	→ Eintracht Braunschweig II	2	(0)
2012–2013	Kickers Offenbach	36	(12)
2013–2015	FC Augsburg II	3	(0)
2013–2015	FC Augsburg	1	(0)
2014	→ Energie Cottbus (loan)	12	(1)
2014–2015	→ Dynamo Dresden (loan)	15	(4)
2015	Dynamo Dresden	6	(0)
2016–2017	Holstein Kiel	47	(8)
2017–2020	Hallescher FC	85	(17)
2020–2022	Kickers Offenbach	68	(24)
2022–2024	Unterhaching	72	(23)
2024–2026	SC Freiburg II	54	(12)
2026–	Karlsruher SC II	9	(3)

International career
2006–2007	Germany U19	4	(1)
2007–2008	Germany U20	1	(0)
- * Club domestic league appearances and goals as of 27 September 2026

Mathias Fetsch (born 30 September 1988) is a German professional footballer who plays as a striker for Karlsruher SC II.

== Career ==
Fetsch made his professional debut for TSV 1860 Munich in the 2. Bundesliga on 22 March 2009 when he was substituted in the 83rd minute in a game against SpVgg Greuther Fürth.

On 3 June 2010, he left 1860 Munich to sign for Eintracht Braunschweig. After two years in Braunschweig, Fetsch's contract was not extended, and he signed with Kickers Offenbach for the 2012–13 season.

After Offenbach were relegated at the end of the 2012–13 season, he left for FC Augsburg. As he hardly got any playing time in Augsburg, he was loaned out to 2. Bundesliga team Energie Cottbus until the end of the 2013–14 season. For the 2014–15 season, he was loaned out to Dynamo Dresden.

In July 2017, Fetsch joined Hallescher FC from Holstein Kiel on a free transfer, signing a two-year contract.

In September 2020, he returned to Kickers Offenbach in the Regionalliga Südwest after a seven-year absence.

On 21 June 2024, Fetsch joined SC Freiburg II in Regionalliga.

== Career statistics ==
As of 25 January 2018

Appearances and goals by club, season and competition
Club	Season	League			National Cup		League Cup		Other		Total	
Club	Season	Division	Apps	Goals	Apps	Goals	Apps	Goals	Apps	Goals	Apps	Goals
Karlsruher SC II	2008–09	Regionalliga Süd	14	2	0	0	0	0	0	0	14	2
1860 Munich II	2008–09	Regionalliga Süd	13	5	0	0	0	0	0	0	13	5
1860 Munich II	2009–10	Regionalliga Süd	33	12	0	0	0	0	0	0	33	12
1860 Munich II	Total		46	17	0	0	0	0	0	0	46	17
1860 Munich	2008–09	2. Bundesliga	1	0	0	0	0	0	0	0	1	0
Eintracht Braunschweig	2010–11	3. Liga	30	5	1	1	0	0	0	0	31	6
Eintracht Braunschweig	2011–12	2. Bundesliga	15	0	1	0	0	0	0	0	16	0
Eintracht Braunschweig	Total		45	5	2	1	0	0	0	0	47	6
Kickers Offenbach	2012–13	3. Liga	35	12	4	2	0	0	0	0	39	14
FC Augsburg	2013–14	Bundesliga	1	0	0	0	0	0	0	0	1	0
FC Augsburg	2014–15	Bundesliga	0	0	0	0	0	0	0	0	0	0
FC Augsburg	Total		1	0	0	0	0	0	0	0	0	0
FC Augsburg II	2013–14	Regionalliga Bayern	3	0	0	0	0	0	0	0	3	0
Energie Cottbus (loan)	2013–14	2. Bundesliga	12	1	0	0	0	0	0	0	12	1
Dynamo Dresden (loan)	2014–15	3. Liga	15	4	1	0	0	0	0	0	16	4
Dynamo Dresden	2015–16	3. Liga	6	0	0	0	0	0	0	0	6	0
Holstein Kiel	2015–16	3. Liga	15	3	0	0	0	0	0	0	15	3
Holstein Kiel	2016–17	3. Liga	32	5	0	0	0	0	0	0	32	5
Holstein Kiel	Total		47	8	0	0	0	0	0	0	47	8
Hallescher FC	2017–18	3. Liga	17	4	0	0	0	0	0	0	17	4
Career totals			242	53	7	3	0	0	0	0	249	56

== Honours ==
SpVgg Unterhaching

- Regionalliga Bayern: 2022–23
