= Hillmer =

Hillmer is a surname. Notable people with the surname include:

- George Hillmer (1866–1935), Canadian merchant and politician
- Jack Hillmer (1918–2007), American architect
- Norman Hillmer (born 1942), Canadian historian and teacher

== See also ==
- Hiller (surname)
- Hilmer
