= Julius Reinhardt (footballer) =

German footballer

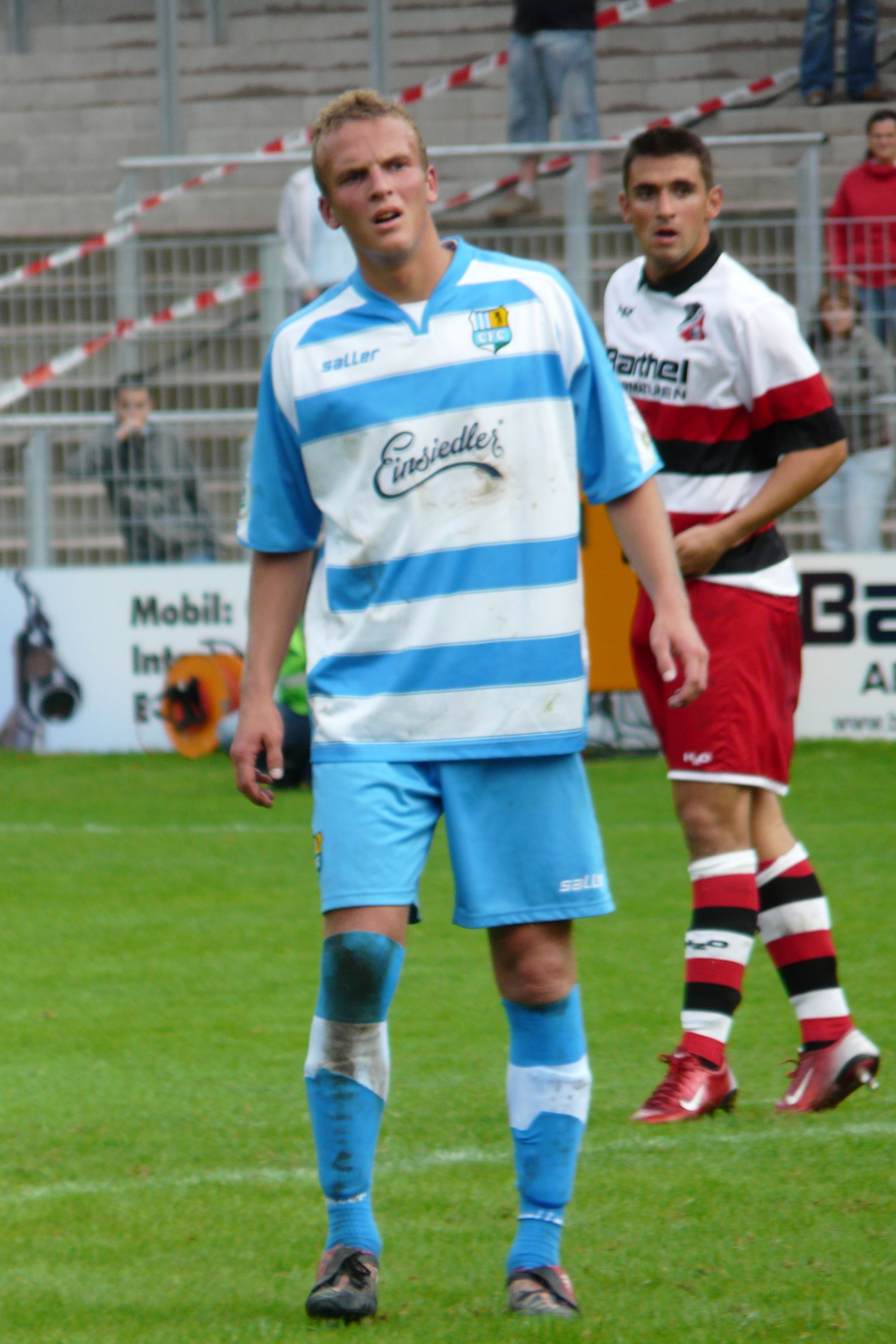
- Reinhardt (left) in 2008.

Personal information
- Date of birth: 29 March 1988 (age 38)
- Place of birth: Karl-Marx-Stadt, East Germany
- Height: 1.82 m (6 ft 0 in)
- Position: Midfielder

Youth career
- VTB Schönau
- –1997: VfB Chemnitz
- 1997–2007: Chemnitzer FC

Senior career*
Years	Team	Apps	(Gls)
2008–2010	Chemnitzer FC	53	(6)
2010–2012	Eintracht Braunschweig	33	(2)
2010–2012	→ Eintracht Braunschweig II	5	(1)
2012–2013	Kickers Offenbach	35	(3)
2013–2016	1. FC Heidenheim	56	(2)
2016–2018	Chemnitzer FC	63	(3)
2018–2021	FSV Zwickau	88	(3)

International career
- Germany U-15
- * Club domestic league appearances and goals

Julius Reinhardt (born 29 March 1988) is a German former professional footballer who played as a midfielder.

== Career ==
Reinhardt joined the first team of Chemnitzer FC in 2007 and quickly became a regular for Chemnitz. After Chemnitz' 2009–10 Regionalliga Nord campaign, in which the club finished in third place, Reinhardt transferred to then 3. Liga club Eintracht Braunschweig. During his first season in Braunschweig the club won promotion to the 2. Bundesliga. After the 2011–12 2. Bundesliga season, he left Braunschweig and joined Kickers Offenbach in the 3. Liga. He signed for 1. FC Heidenheim a year later. On 19 June 2016, Reinhardt transferred back to Chemnitzer FC for an undisclosed fee. On 1 July 2018, Reinhardt transferred to FSV Zwickau.
