= Eric Veiga =

Luxembourgish footballer

Personal information
- Date of birth: 18 February 1997 (age 29)
- Place of birth: Luxembourg City, Luxembourg
- Height: 1.83 m (6 ft 0 in)
- Position: Midfielder

Team information
- Current team: Atert Bissen
- Number: 18

Youth career
- FC Mondercange
- –2012: RFC Union
- 2013–2015: Bayer Leverkusen
- 2015–2016: Eintracht Braunschweig

Senior career*
Years	Team	Apps	(Gls)
2016–2019	Eintracht Braunschweig II	44	(4)
2019–2020	Aves	2	(0)
2020–2023	Vilafranquense	60	(1)
2023–2025	AVS	8	(0)
2025–2026	Flamurtari	30	(0)
2026–	Atert Bissen	7	(0)

International career^{‡}
2014	Luxembourg U19	3	(0)
2015	Portugal U18	3	(0)
2016	Portugal U19	1	(0)
2016–	Luxembourg	11	(0)
- * Club domestic league appearances and goals as of 20 September 2026 ‡ National team caps and goals as of 6 October 2026

Eric Veiga (born 18 February 1997) is a Luxembourgish professional footballer who plays as a left-back or midfielder for BGL Ligue club Atert Bissen.

== Club career ==
In 2015, Veiga joined the under-19 side of German club Eintracht Braunschweig from the youth of Bayer 04 Leverkusen. On 3 March 2016, he made his debut for Eintracht Braunschweig II in the Regionalliga Nord.

In July 2019, Veiga moved to Portuguese club C.D. Aves, starting for the club's U23-squad.

== International career ==
Veiga represented both Luxembourg and Portugal at youth international level. On 18 May 2016, he was called up to the Luxembourg senior team by then manager Luc Holtz for a match against Nigeria, but did not play. Veiga made his debut for Luxembourg on 2 September 2016 in a friendly against Latvia.
