= Dennis Lemke =

German footballer

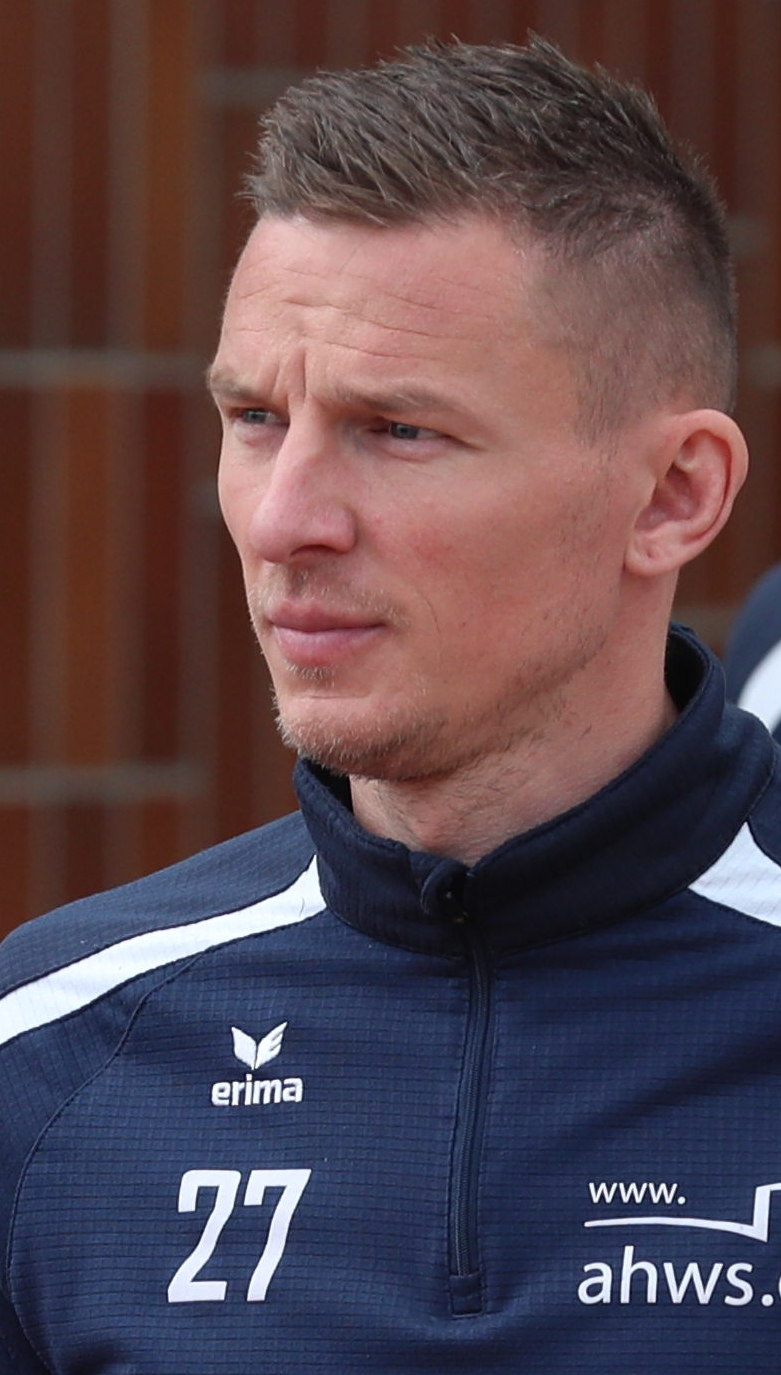
- Lemke in 2022 with VSG Altglienicke

Personal information
- Date of birth: 8 March 1989 (age 37)
- Place of birth: Berlin, West Germany
- Height: 1.74 m (5 ft 9 in)
- Position: Midfielder

Youth career
- Reinickendorfer Füchse
- Frohnauer SC
- –2003: 1. FC Lübars
- 2003–2008: Hertha BSC

Senior career*
Years	Team	Apps	(Gls)
2008–2010	Hertha BSC II	28	(2)
2010–2011	Eintracht Braunschweig	1	(0)
2010–2011	Eintracht Braunschweig II	15	(1)
2011	Carl Zeiss Jena	0	(0)
2011–2013	SV Babelsberg 03	20	(0)
2013–2014	RKC Waalwijk	0	(0)
2014	SV Babelsberg 03	15	(2)
2014–2016	Hessen Kassel	52	(3)
2016–2018	Teutonia Watzenborn-Steinberg	50	(8)
2018–2022	VSG Altglienicke	56	(3)
- * Club domestic league appearances and goals as of 20:37, 18 September 2022 (UTC)

Dennis Lemke (born 8 March 1989) is a German footballer who most recently played as a midfielder for VSG Altglienicke in the Regionalliga Nordost.

== Career ==
After playing youth football for various clubs in his hometown of Berlin, Lemke joined Eintracht Braunschweig in the 3. Liga from Hertha BSC's reserve side in 2010. At Braunschweig, Lemke made his professional debut on 21 September 2010 in a league game against FC Rot-Weiß Erfurt, but could not establish himself in the team afterwards. He subsequently left Braunschweig at the end of the season. After a short stint at Carl Zeiss Jena Lemke signed a contract with 3. Liga side SV Babelsberg 03 in 2011. In 2013, he transferred to the Dutch Eredivisie club RKC Waalwijk. In January 2014, Lemke rejoined his former team SV Babelsberg 03 on a free transfer after he had not been able to impress RKC Waalwijk. Half a season later, he signed for Hessen Kassel.
