= Marjan Petković =

German footballer

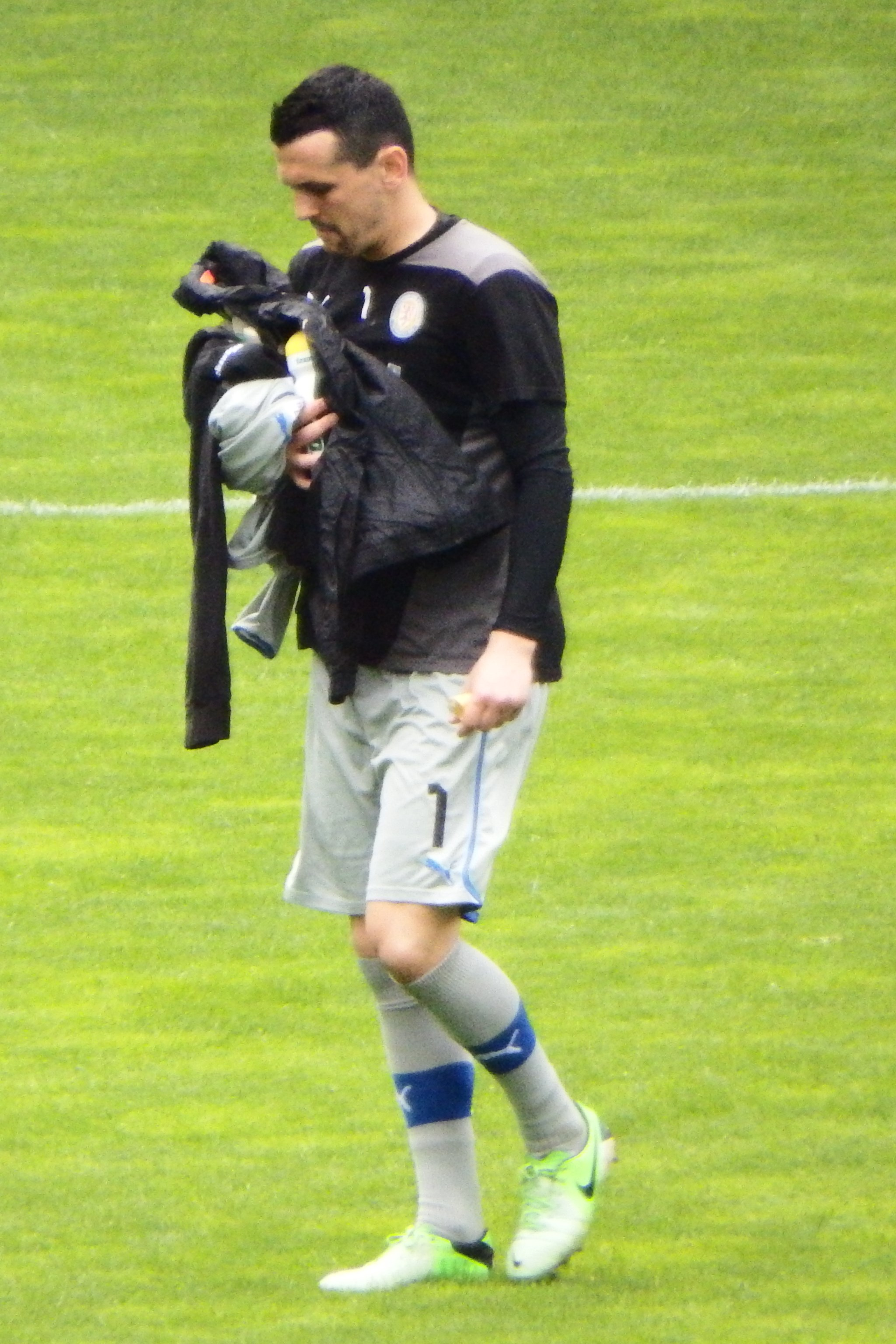

Personal information
- Date of birth: 22 May 1979 (age 47)
- Place of birth: Brackenheim, West Germany
- Height: 1.86 m (6 ft 1 in)
- Position: Goalkeeper

Youth career
- –1998: TSV Güglingen
- 1998–2000: SG Kirchardt

Senior career*
Years	Team	Apps	(Gls)
2000–2002	VfR Heilbronn	37	(0)
2002–2004	TSG 1899 Hoffenheim	0	(0)
2002–2004	→ TSG 1899 Hoffenheim II	30	(0)
2004–2008	SV Sandhausen	115	(0)
2008–2009	FSV Frankfurt	2	(0)
2009–2015	Eintracht Braunschweig	88	(0)
2011–2012	→ Eintracht Braunschweig II	5	(0)
- * Club domestic league appearances and goals as of 16:49, 27 May 2015 (UTC)

Marjan Petković (born 22 May 1979 in Brackenheim) is a German football player of Serbian descent. He is currently a free agent, having lastly played six years for Eintracht Braunschweig until 2015.

== Career ==
He made his debut on the professional league level in the 2. Bundesliga with FSV Frankfurt on 1 March 2009 when he came on as a substitute in the 65th minute after the main goalkeeper Patric Klandt was sent off for a professional foul. Petković left FSV Frankfurt after one season to join Eintracht Braunschweig in the 3. Liga. In 2010–11, he was Braunschweig's starting goalkeeper when the club won promotion back into the 2. Bundesliga. Because of an injury, Petković lost his starting spot to Daniel Davari early in the 2011–12 2. Bundesliga season. During the 2012–13 2. Bundesliga season, he made four league appearances throughout the campaign when Braunschweig won promotion to the Bundesliga. On the first matchday of the 2013–14 Bundesliga season, Petković then made his debut in the first tier, getting the start over Davari in Braunschweig's opening game against SV Werder Bremen. In 2015, after six years with Eintracht Braunschweig, he left the club after his contract had expired.
