= Benjamin Fuchs =

Austrian footballer (born 1983)

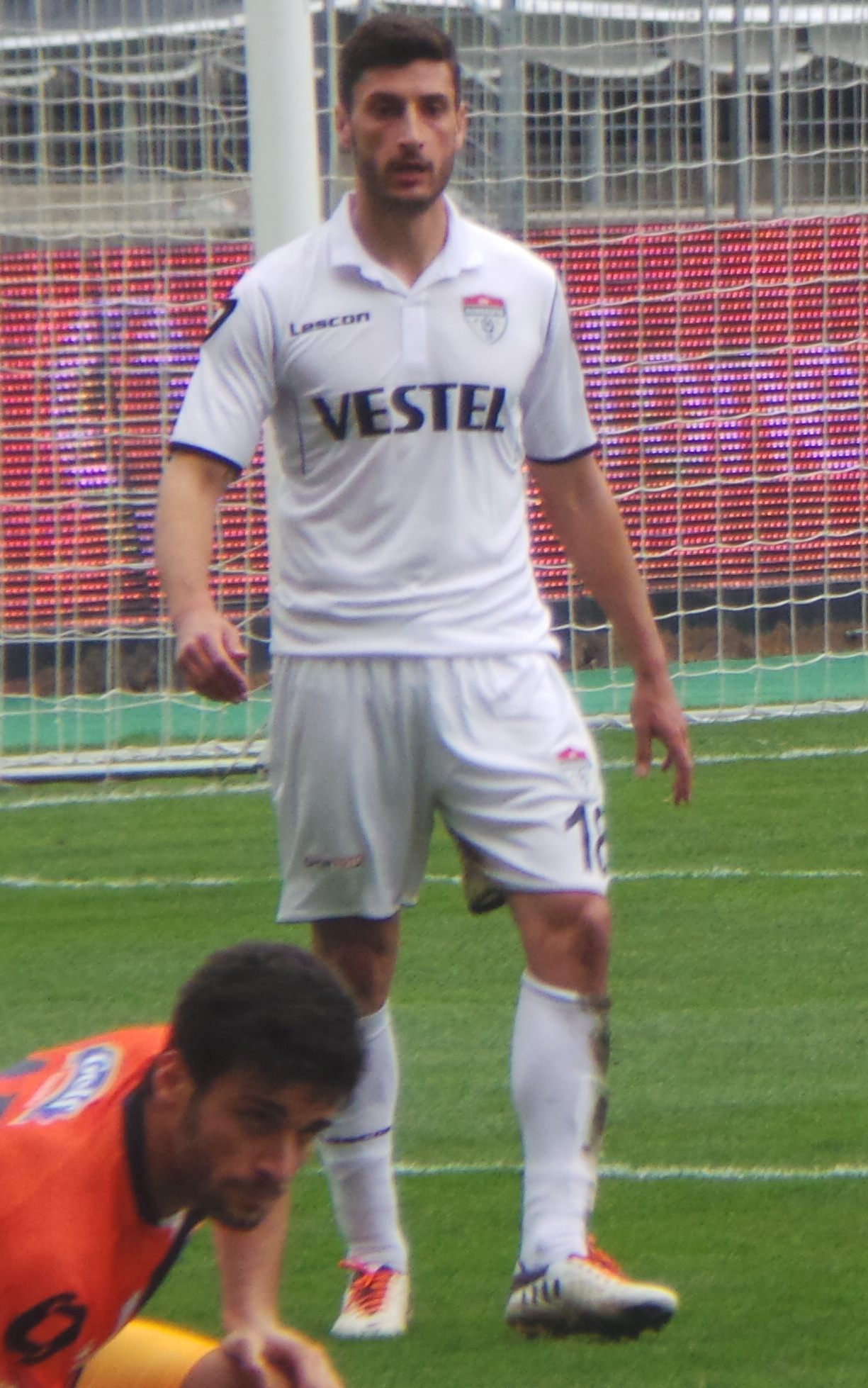
- Fuchs with Manisaspor

Personal information
- Date of birth: 20 October 1983 (age 43)
- Place of birth: Nuremberg, West Germany
- Height: 1.80 m (5 ft 11 in)
- Position: Right-back

Youth career
- 1. FC Nürnberg
- Greuther Fürth

Senior career*
Years	Team	Apps	(Gls)
2002–2006	Greuther Fürth II	105	(20)
2006	Greuther Fürth	9	(0)
2006–2007	SV Wehen	20	(0)
2007–2012	Eintracht Braunschweig	96	(4)
2007–2012	Eintracht Braunschweig II	16	(1)
2012–2014	Manisaspor	68	(1)
2014–2015	Konyaspor	21	(0)
2015–2017	Göztepe	30	(0)
2016	→ Gaziantep BB (loan)	13	(0)
2018	Gümüşhanespor	16	(0)
2018–2019	Fatih Karagümrük	9	(0)
2019–2020	Buca FK	11	(0)
Total		404	(26)

International career
	Austria U19	1	(0)
- * Club domestic league appearances and goals

Benjamin Fuchs (born 20 October 1983) is an Austrian former professional footballer who played as a right-back. He also holds German citizenship.

== Career ==
Fuchs started his senior career with Greuther Fürth, making his professional debut during the 2005–06 2. Bundesliga season. After the season, he joined Regionalliga side SV Wehen for one year, before signing with Eintracht Braunschweig in 2007. After spending four seasons with Braunschweig in the 3rd tier of German football, both Fuchs and the club made it back into the 2. Bundesliga for 2011–12. At the end of the season, his contract with Eintracht Braunschweig was not extended and Fuchs went on to join Manisaspor in the Turkish TFF First League. In 2014, Fuchs transferred to Süper Lig side Torku Konyaspor.

== Personal life ==
His mother is Turkish and his father is Austrian.
