= Oliver Petersch =

German footballer (born 1989)

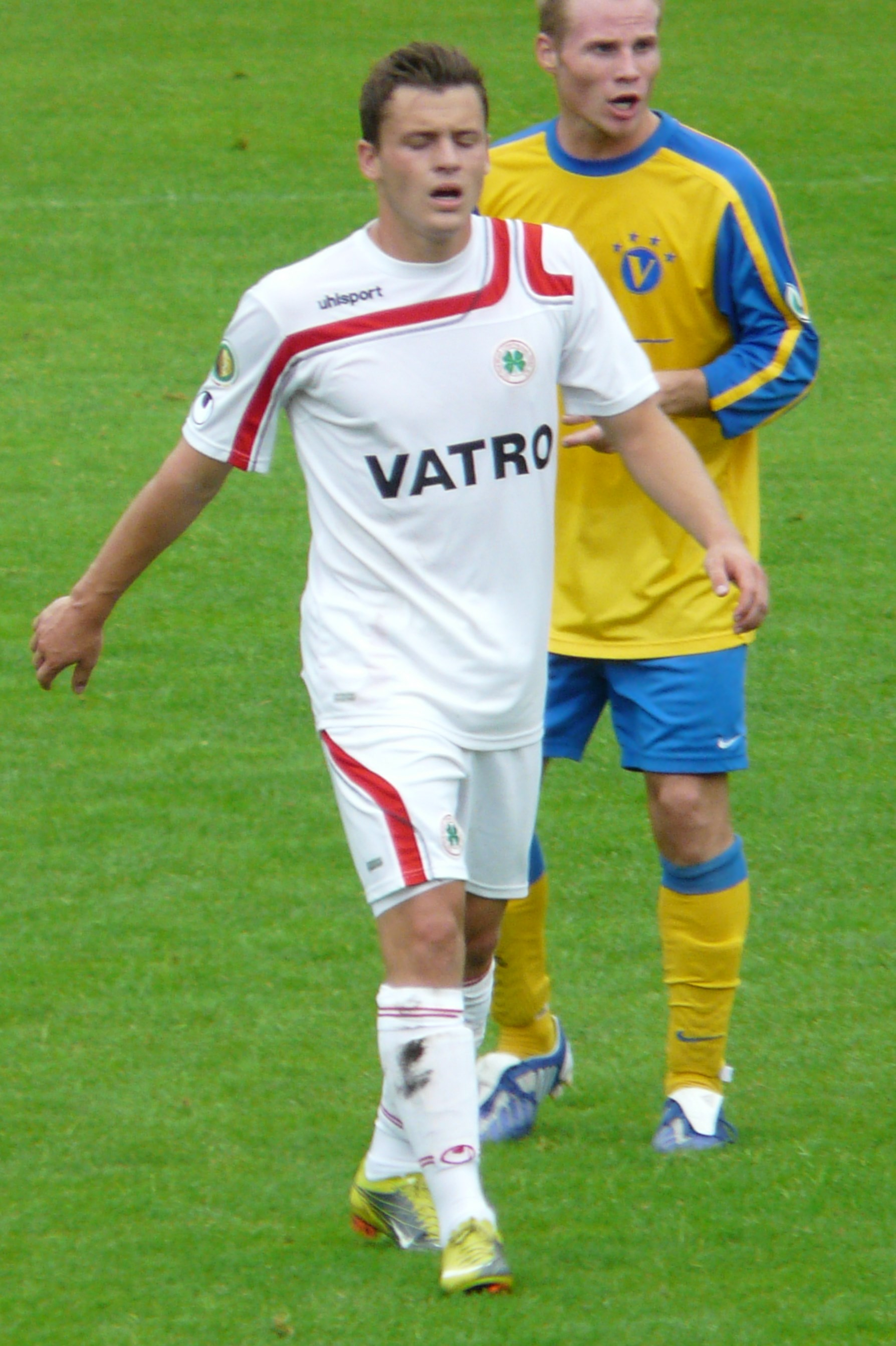
- Petersch (left) in 2010

Personal information
- Full name: Oliver Petersch
- Date of birth: 26 April 1989 (age 37)
- Place of birth: Bitburg, West Germany
- Height: 1.72 m (5 ft 8 in)
- Position: Midfielder

Youth career
- FC Bitburg
- SV Wolsfeld
- –2008: Bayer 04 Leverkusen

Senior career*
Years	Team	Apps	(Gls)
2008–2009	Bayer 04 Leverkusen II	22	(0)
2009–2011	→ Rot-Weiß Oberhausen (loan)	57	(2)
2011–2013	Eintracht Braunschweig	25	(1)
2011–2013	→ Eintracht Braunschweig II	2	(0)
2013–2014	Arminia Bielefeld	2	(0)

International career^{‡}
- Germany U-16
2006–2007	Germany U-18	6	(0)
	Germany U-19	4	(0)
2008–2009	Germany U-20	2	(0)
- * Club domestic league appearances and goals as of 26 July 2013 ‡ National team caps and goals as of 17 April 2012

Oliver Petersch (born 26 April 1989 in Bitburg) is a German footballer who played in the 2. Bundesliga.

== Career ==
Petersch began his career at the reserve side of Bayer 04 Leverkusen, but couldn't break into the club's first team. He was loaned out to Rot-Weiß Oberhausen in 2009, where he established himself as a regular in the 2. Bundesliga. After his loan spell, Petersch did not return to Leverkusen, but transferred to Eintracht Braunschweig instead. After 14 games in his initial season with the team, he missed the entire first half of the 2012–13 season due to injury. He finally returned from injury on 2 February 2013 in a league game against SC Paderborn 07, in which he also scored his first goal for Braunschweig. His contract in Braunschweig was not renewed after the 2012–13 season and Petersch went on to join Arminia Bielefeld. He was released by Bielefeld after one season with the club.
