= Kevin Pannewitz =

German footballer (born 1991)

Personal information
- Date of birth: 16 October 1991 (age 35)
- Place of birth: Berlin, Germany
- Height: 1.85 m (6 ft 1 in)
- Position: Midfielder

Team information
- Current team: FC Amed
- Number: 99

Youth career
- MSV Normannia 08
- 1. FC Lübars
- Nordberliner SC
- Frohnauer SC
- –2008: Tennis Borussia Berlin
- 2008–2009: Hansa Rostock

Senior career*
Years	Team	Apps	(Gls)
2009–2012	Hansa Rostock II	11	(3)
2009–2012	Hansa Rostock	72	(5)
2012–2013	VfL Wolfsburg	0	(0)
2013	VfL Wolfsburg II	2	(0)
2013–2015	Goslarer SC 08	30	(1)
2015–2016	VSG Altglienicke		
2016–2017	Oranienburger FC Eintracht		
2017–2018	Carl Zeiss Jena	23	(1)
2017–2018	Carl Zeiss Jena II	9	(3)
2019	SC Siemensstadt	0	(0)
2019–	FC Amed	8	(3)
- * Club domestic league appearances and goals as of 16:35, 23 February 2020 (UTC)

Kevin Pannewitz (born 16 October 1991) is a German footballer who plays as a midfielder for FC Amed.

== Club career ==
=== Youth career ===
Born in Berlin, Pannewitz began his career for hometown clubs MSV Normannia 08, 1. FC Lübars, Nordberliner SC and Frohnauer SC.

=== Professional career ===
After several seasons with Tennis Borussia Berlin, he joined FC Hansa Rostock in summer 2008.

On 10 June 2012, VfL Wolfsburg announced on their official website the signing of Kevin Pannewitz from Hansa Rostock on a two-year contract.

In May 2017 Pannewitz started training at 3. Liga side Carl Zeiss Jena in an attempt to return to professional football. In August he signed a two-year performance-related contract with the club after losing 30 kilos of body weight since January. In January 2019, he was dismissed by the club.

=== Later career ===
Almost nine months after being kicked out in Jena due to weight problems, German Kreisliga club SC Siemensstadt announced on 14 September 2019, that Pannewitz had made comeback in football and joined the club. However, before even playing for the club, less than one month after his arrival, he left the club again and joined FC Amed.

== Career statistics ==
Appearances and goals by club, season and competition
Club	Season	League			DFB-Pokal		Other		Total	
Club	Season	Division	Apps	Goals	Apps	Goals	Apps	Goals	Apps	Goals
Hansa Rostock	2009–10	2. Bundesliga	16	0	0	0	1 (Note: Appearance in the Relegation playoff)	0	17	0
Hansa Rostock	2010–11	3. Liga	35	4	1	0	—		35	4
Hansa Rostock	2011–12	2. Bundesliga	21	1	0	0	—			
Hansa Rostock	Total		72	5	1	0	1	0	74	5
Hansa Rostock II	2009–10	Regionalliga Nord	8	3	—		—		8	3
VfL Wolfsburg II	2012–13	Regionalliga Nord	2	0	—		—		2	0
Goslarer SC	2013–14	Regionalliga Nord	17	1	0	0	—		17	1
Goslarer SC	2014–15	Regionalliga Nord	16	0	0	0	—		16	0
Goslarer SC	Total		33	1	0	0	—		33	1
Carl Zeiss Jena	2017–18	3. Liga	14	1	0	0	—		14	1
Carl Zeiss Jena	2018–19	3. Liga	9	0	0	0	—		9	0
Carl Zeiss Jena	Total		23	1	0	0	—		23	1
Carl Zeiss Jena II	2017–18	Oberliga NOFV-Süd	7	3	—		—		7	3
Carl Zeiss Jena II	2018–19	Oberliga NOFV-Süd	2	0	—		—		2	0
Carl Zeiss Jena II	Total		9	3	—		—		9	3
Career total			147	13	1	0	1	0	149	13
