= Pierre le Beau =

German footballer

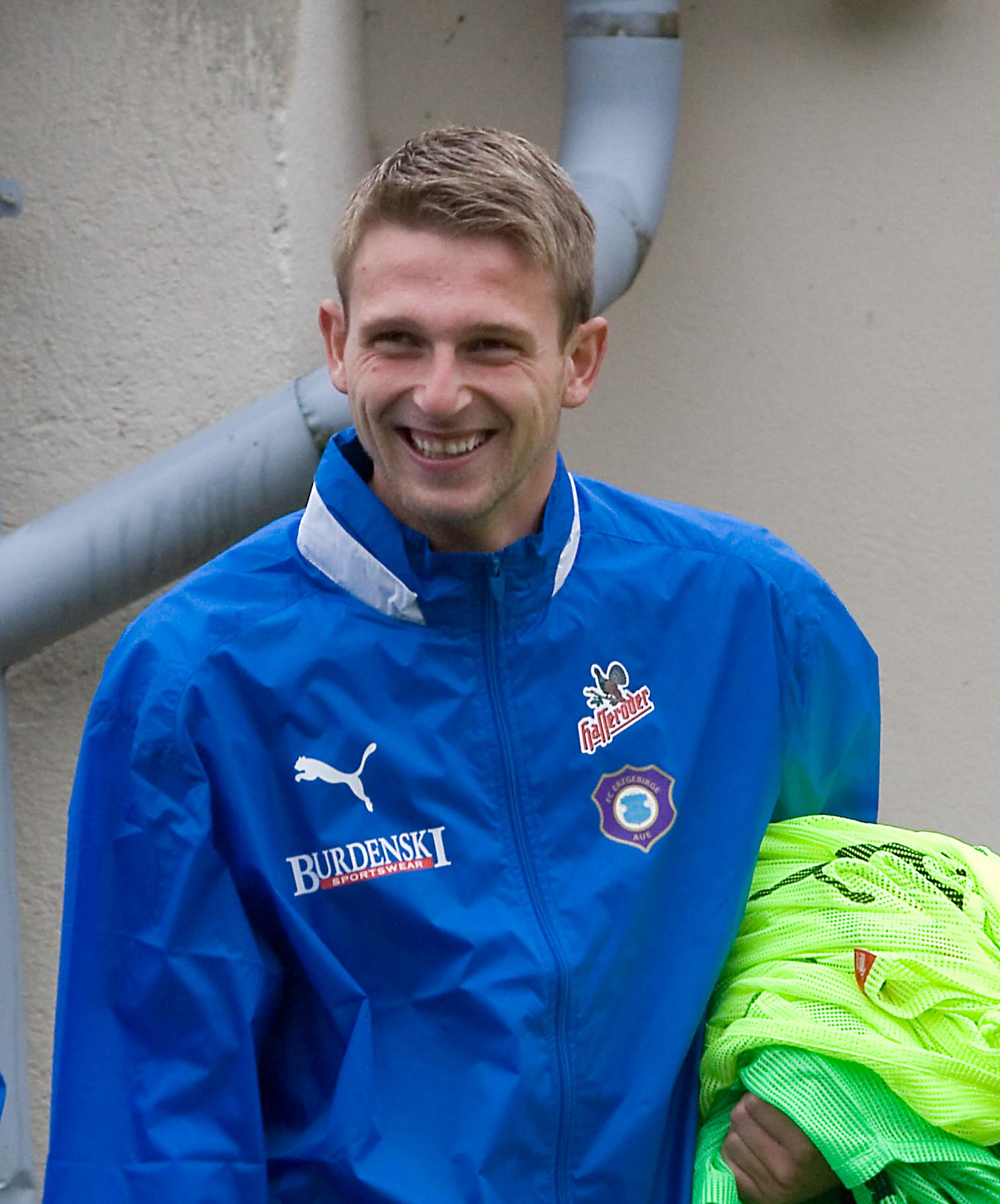
- Le Beau training with Erzgebirge Aue

Personal information
- Date of birth: 8 March 1986 (age 40)
- Place of birth: Karl-Marx-Stadt, East Germany
- Height: 1.86 m (6 ft 1 in)
- Position: Right-back

Youth career
- –2000: Chemnitzer FC
- 2000–2005: Erzgebirge Aue

Senior career*
Years	Team	Apps	(Gls)
2005–2008	Erzgebirge Aue II		
2008–2012	Erzgebirge Aue	95	(2)
2012–2014	Chemnitzer FC II	21	(3)
2012–2014	Chemnitzer FC	27	(1)
2014–2015	SSV Markranstädt	28	(4)
2015–2019	ZFC Meuselwitz	129	(7)
- * Club domestic league appearances and goals

Pierre le Beau (born 8 March 1986) is a German former professional footballer who played as a right-back.
