= New York International FC =

Soccer club based in New York City, New York

- Nickname: Lions
- Founded: 2019 (7 years ago)
- Stadium: Randalls Island Fields; New York City, New York
- President: Corentin Claisse
- Manager: Nick Platt
- Coach: Gary Philpott
- League: American Premier Soccer League
- 2024–25: Cosmopolitan Soccer League, 2nd of 12 (promoted)
- Website: nyintfc.com
Home colors	Away colors

New York International FC (NYIFC), commonly known as NY International FC, is an American soccer club based in the New York City borough of Manhattan. The club's first team competes in the American Premier Soccer League, a multi-state league in the amateur United States Adult Soccer Association system, while its second and third teams compete in the Cosmopolitan Soccer League. It plays its home games on Randalls Island.

== History ==
The club was promoted to the American Premier Soccer League for the 2025/26 season.

== Club Culture ==
=== Community work ===
The club has close links with 501(C)(3) local non-profit EVLovesNYC, a New York City-based soup kitchen and mutual aid organisation.

=== Davide Giri remembrance ===
New York International player Davide Giri was fatally stabbed on his way home from training on Thursday, December 22, 2021. The 31-year-old Italian played for the club as a defender and was a graduate student at Columbia University.

In memoriam, the club organises a yearly event, the 5k for Davide, which raises funds for local charities.

== Seasons ==
List of New York International FC seasons
Season	League	Pld	W	D	L	GF	GA	GD	Pos	USOC	Ref
2022–23	CSL2	16	10	4	2	30	15	+15	3rd of 18	DNQ	
2023–24	CSL2 ↑	18	14	1	3	70	28	+42	1st of 19	DNQ	
2024–25	CSL ↑	22	15	3	4	63	31	+32	2nd of 12	DNQ	
2025-26	APSL	Future season								DNQ	

== Honours ==
- Cosmopolitan Soccer League
  - Division 2 Champions: 2024
- CSL League Cup
  - Champions: 2024
