= Stefan Müller (footballer, born 1988) =

German footballer

Personal information
- Date of birth: 9 November 1988 (age 38)
- Place of birth: Karlsruhe, West Germany
- Height: 1.91 m (6 ft 3 in)
- Position: Defender

Team information
- Current team: KSV Hessen Kassel
- Number: 5

Youth career
- 1998–2007: Karlsruher SC

Senior career*
Years	Team	Apps	(Gls)
2007–2010	Karlsruher SC II	70	(7)
2009–2012	Karlsruher SC	31	(2)
2012–	KSV Hessen Kassel	35	(3)
- * Club domestic league appearances and goals as of 18 July 2013

Stefan Müller (born 9 November 1988) is a German footballer who plays for KSV Hessen Kassel.

Müller made his debut for Karlsruher SC on 3 April 2010, in a 1–1 away draw against 1. FC Union Berlin, after coming off the bench to replace Anton Fink in the 89th minute.
