= Nils Fischer =

German footballer

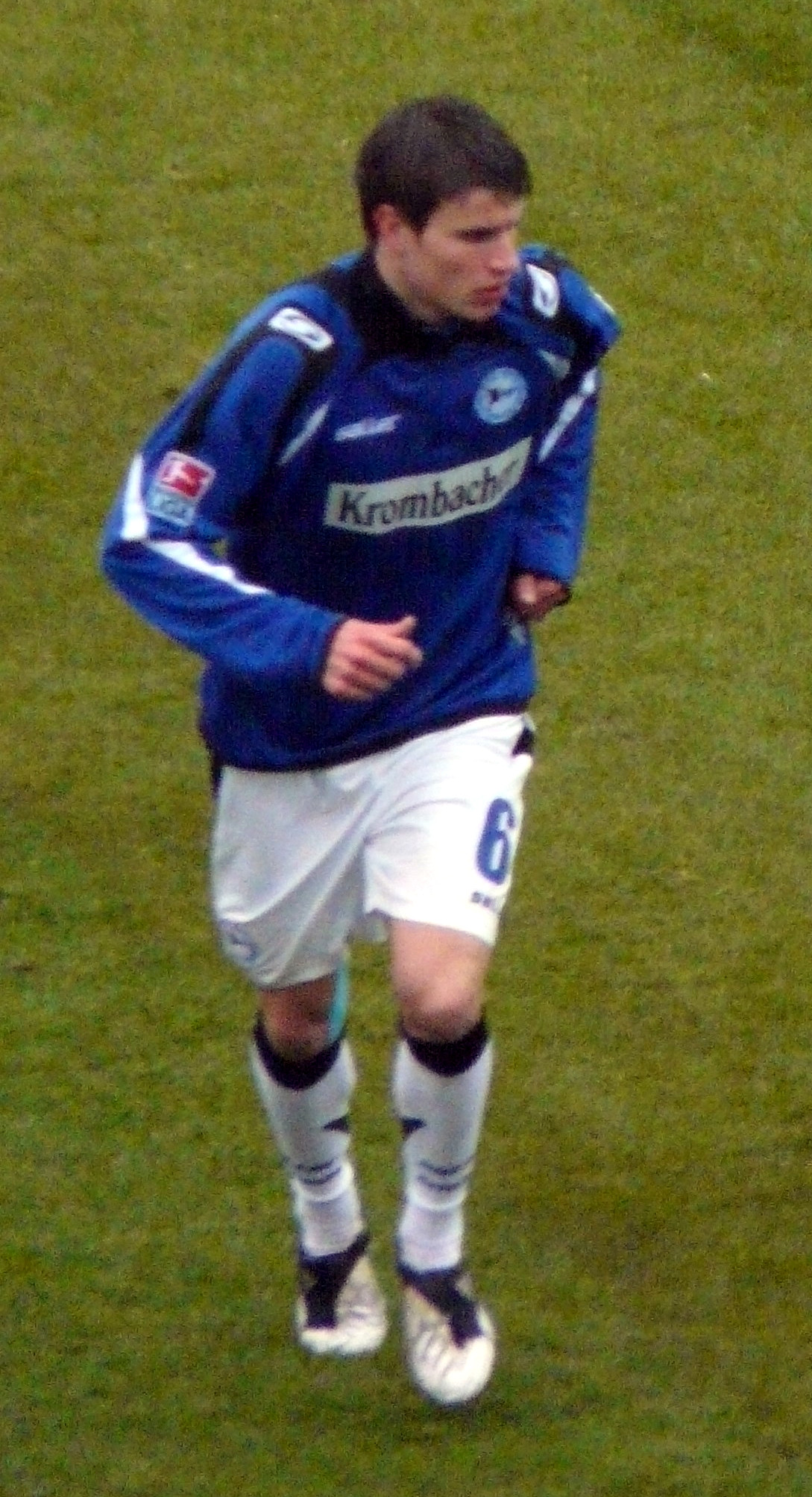

Personal information
- Full name: Nils Fischer
- Date of birth: 14 February 1987 (age 39)
- Place of birth: Bielefeld, West Germany
- Height: 1.83 m (6 ft 0 in)
- Position: Right-back

Youth career
- TuS Eintracht Bielefeld
- –1998: VfL Schildesche
- 1998–2005: Arminia Bielefeld

Senior career*
Years	Team	Apps	(Gls)
2005–2006	Arminia Bielefeld II	6	(0)
2006–2011	Arminia Bielefeld	35	(1)
2009	→ Wuppertaler SV (loan)	13	(1)
2011–2013	VfL Osnabrück	68	(0)
2013–2014	1. FC Saarbrücken	27	(2)
2014–2017	FC Homburg	78	(5)
- * Club domestic league appearances and goals

Nils Fischer (born 14 February 1987) is a retired German footballer who played as a right-back.
