= Guido Koçer =

Turkish footballer

Personal information
- Date of birth: 15 September 1988 (age 38)
- Place of birth: Worms, West Germany
- Height: 1.75 m (5 ft 9 in)
- Position: Winger

Team information
- Current team: Greifswalder FC
- Number: 7

Youth career
- 1998–2000: SV Seckach
- 2000–2003: TuS Neuhausen
- 2003–2007: Hansa Rostock

Senior career*
Years	Team	Apps	(Gls)
2007–2009	Hansa Rostock II	39	(17)
2008–2009	Hansa Rostock	4	(0)
2009–2011	SV Babelsberg 03	59	(7)
2011–2014	Erzgebirge Aue	81	(10)
2014–2016	Gençlerbirliği	28	(2)
2016	→ Yeni Malatyaspor (loan)	14	(1)
2016–2017	Giresunspor	10	(1)
2017–2019	Boluspor	72	(14)
2019–2021	Samsunspor	57	(9)
2021–2022	Bandırmaspor	25	(3)
2022–	Greifswalder FC	59	(14)

International career
2009	Turkey U21	1	(0)
- * Club domestic league appearances and goals as of 1 January 2025

Guido Koçer (born 15 September 1988) is a professional footballer who plays as a winger for German club Greifswalder FC. Born in Germany, he made one appearance for the Turkey U21 national team.

== Club career ==
Koçer began his career with SV Seckach but joined in 2000 after two years TuS Neuhausen. Koçer played three years on youth side for TuS Neuhausen, before he was scouted from Hansa Rostock in 2003. Koçer played four years for Hansa Rostock in the youth and was promoted to the 2. Bundesliga team in summer 2008. He was fired and released from his contract with Hansa Rostock on 19 March 2009. On 29 April 2009, he had a trial at Rot-Weiß Oberhausen. Koçer was then a short time free agent and was on 2 August 2009 signed by SV Babelsberg 03 on a-one year contract. Two years later he signed for Erzgebirge Aue.

== International career ==
Koçer has played for Turkey U21. He made his debut on 10 February 2009 against the Ukraine U21.
