= Hilmer =

Hilmer is a masculine given name. Notable people with the name include:

- Hilmer Ekdahl (1889–1967), cinematographer
- Hilmer Kenty (born 1955), boxer
- Hilmer Löfberg (1887–1940), diver
- Hilmer Pettersson, footballer
- Hilmer Swanson (1932–2005), radio engineer

== See also ==
- David C. Hilmers (born 1950), astronaut
- Fred Hilmer (born 1945), academic
- Hilmer doctrine in patent law
- Hilmer Lodge Stadium, in California
- Hilmer Motorsport, German racing team
