= Kevin Schlitte =

German footballer

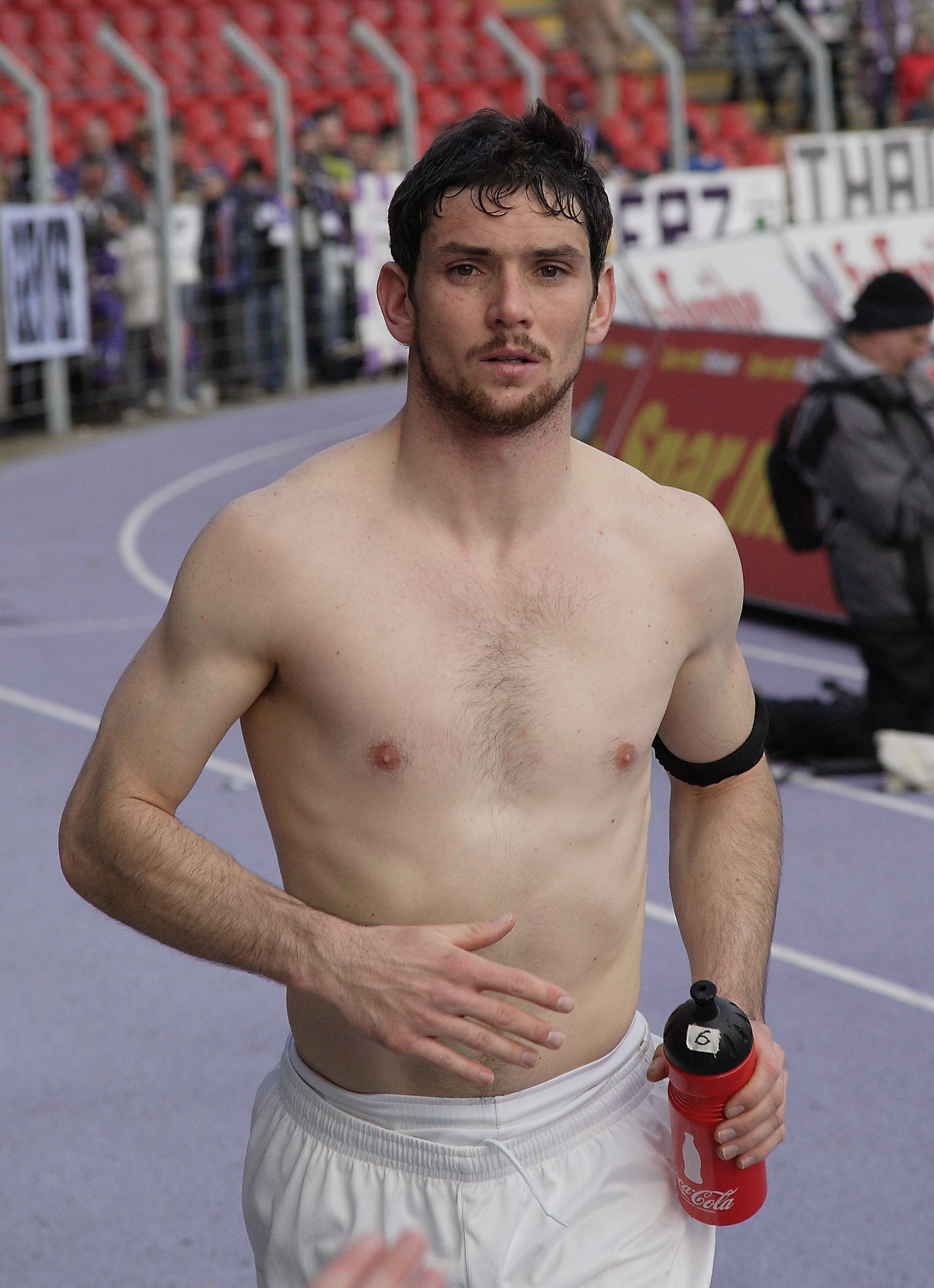
- Schlitte after a game with Aue in 2011.

Personal information
- Date of birth: 4 November 1981 (age 44)
- Place of birth: Haldensleben, East Germany
- Height: 1.84 m (6 ft 0 in)
- Position: Midfielder

Youth career
- 1987–1989: Medizin Haldensleben
- 1989–1991: Lokomotive Haldensleben
- 1991–1994: Fortuna Magdeburg
- 1994–1999: Haldensleber SC

Senior career*
Years	Team	Apps	(Gls)
1999–2002	Haldenslebener SC	14	(3)
2003	SV Südharz Walkenried	8	(1)
2004–2005	Germania Halberstadt	55	(21)
2005–2007	Carl Zeiss Jena	44	(5)
2007–2009	SC Freiburg	40	(2)
2009–2010	Hansa Rostock	30	(1)
2010–2014	Erzgebirge Aue	90	(3)
2014–2015	Germania Halberstadt	26	(3)
2015–2017	Haldensleber SC	15	(2)
2017	Blau-Weiß Neuenhofe	13	(1)
Total		335	(42)

Managerial career
- 2018–: Haldensleber SC
- * Club domestic league appearances and goals

Kevin Schlitte (born 4 November 1981) is a German former professional footballer who played as a midfielder and is actually the coach of Haldensleber SC.

== Career ==
Schlitte was born in Haldensleben, Saxony-Anhalt.

He joined SC Freiburg from Carl Zeiss Jena in 2007. After two years, he went back to East Germany to sign with Hansa Rostock. After Rostock had been relegated, he signed for Erzgebirge Aue on 28 May 2010.
