= Narciso Lubasa =

Angolan-German footballer

Personal information
- Date of birth: 7 March 1989 (age 37)
- Place of birth: Luanda, Angola
- Height: 1.86 m (6 ft 1 in)
- Position: Midfielder

Team information
- Current team: SV Eintracht Hohkeppel
- Number: 23

Youth career
- FC Viktoria Arnoldsweiler

Senior career*
Years	Team	Apps	(Gls)
2009–2012	Alemannia Aachen II		
2010–2012	Alemannia Aachen	4	(0)
2012–2013	Eintracht Trier	9	(0)
2013	KFC Uerdingen	13	(1)
2013–2014	Viktoria Arnoldsweiler	27	(5)
2014–2016	TuS Erndtebrück	40	(2)
2015	TuS Erndtebrück II	1	(0)
2016–2017	Schwarz-Weiß Rehden	19	(1)
2017–2019	VfL Oldenburg	41	(7)
2019–	SV Eintracht Hohkeppel	27	(2)
- * Club domestic league appearances and goals as of 13 November 2022

Narciso Lubasa (born 7 March 1989) is an Angolan-German footballer who plays as a midfielder for Mittelrheinliga club SV Eintracht Hohkeppel.

He played for Alemannia Aachen in the 2. Bundesliga until their relegation to the 3. Liga in summer 2012.
