= Enrico Gaede =

German former footballer

Personal information
- Date of birth: 31 January 1982 (age 44)
- Place of birth: Stralsund, East Germany
- Height: 1.82 m (6 ft 0 in)
- Position: Midfielder

Youth career
- –2000: FC Pommern Stralsund
- 2000–2001: Borussia Mönchengladbach

Senior career*
Years	Team	Apps	(Gls)
2001–2003	Borussia Mönchengladbach II		
2002–2004	Borussia Mönchengladbach	35	(0)
2005	→ Rot-Weiss Essen (loan)	9	(0)
2005–2006	F.C. Hansa Rostock	12	(0)
2007–2008	Sportfreunde Siegen	46	(2)
2008–2015	KSV Hessen Kassel	186	(30)
- * Club domestic league appearances and goals

Enrico Gaede (born 31 January 1982 in Stralsund, East Germany) is a German former footballer. He spent three seasons in the Bundesliga with Borussia Mönchengladbach and played 35 games.
