= Nico Zimmermann =

German footballer (born 1985)

Personal information
- Date of birth: 2 September 1985 (age 41)
- Place of birth: Zweibrücken, West Germany
- Height: 1.78 m (5 ft 10 in)
- Position: Attacking midfielder

Youth career
- 1. FC Kaiserslautern
- –2004: 1. FC Saarbrücken

Senior career*
| Years | Team | Apps | (Gls) |
| –2007 | 1. FC Saarbrücken II | | |
| 2005–2007 | 1. FC Saarbrücken | 1 | (0) |
| 2007–2009 | SV Elversberg | 50 | (8) |
| 2009–2011 | 1. FC Saarbrücken | 64 | (15) |
| 2011–2012 | Eintracht Braunschweig | 22 | (2) |
| 2012–2013 | VfR Aalen | 5 | (0) |
| 2013 | → Hansa Rostock (loan) | 10 | (0) |
| 2013–2015 | SV Elversberg | 17 | (2) |
| 2015 | → FC Homburg (loan) | 12 | (1) |
| 2016–2022 | SV Röchling Völklingen | 123 | (49) |
- * Club domestic league appearances and goals as of 1 February 2016

Nico Zimmermann (born 2 September 1985) is a German former professional footballer who played as a midfielder.

== Career ==
Zimmermann came through 1. FC Saarbrücken youth system, having previously played for 1. FC Kaiserslautern, and progressed to the first team, making his debut in the 2. Bundesliga, in the last game of the 2005–06 season against Eintracht Braunschweig as a substitute for Arif Karaoglan. Saarbrücken had been relegated to the Regionalliga, but Zimmermann didn't make another first-team appearance, so left the club in January 2007, joining SV Elversberg. After two and a half years with Elversberg, he returned to FCS in 2009. The club won the Regionalliga West in his first season back, and after helping the club achieve a respectable finish in the 3. Liga, he joined Eintracht Braunschweig in July 2011. After a year with Braunschweig, he signed for VfR Aalen. Six months later, he joined Hansa Rostock on a half-season loan. In August 2013 he returned to SV Elversberg, who had just been promoted to the 3. Liga
