= TuS Mechtersheim =

German football club

- Full name: Turn- und Sportverein Mechtersheim 1914
- Founded: 1914
- Ground: Stadion an der Kirschenallee
- Capacity: 2,000
- Chairman: Gösta Geiger
- Manager: Manfred Schmitt
- League: Oberliga Rheinland-Pfalz/Saar (V)
- 2025–26: Verbandsliga Südwest (VI), 1st of 16 (promoted)
Home colours	Away colours

TuS Mechtersheim are a German association football club based in Mechtersheim.

== History ==
TuS Mechtersheim was founded on 1 March 1914 as Viktoria Mechtersheim. Following the conclusion of World War I the club was remade as Sportverein Mechtersheim. With the formation of an athletics department in 1930 came the adoption of the name Turn- und Sportverein Mechtersheim. In the aftermath of World War II organizations across the country, including sports and football clubs, were ordered dissolved by occupying Allied authorities. The club was re-established as ASV Mechtersheim in 1946, before resuming its old identity as Tus Mechtersheim in March 1950.

TuS played through most of its history at the amateur level. The team won promotion to the Landesliga Südwest-Ost (VI) in 2001 before advancing through the Verbandsliga Südwest (V) to the Oberliga Südwest (IV) in 2004.

For the next eleven seasons the club played in the Oberliga, with a seventh place in 2013 as its best result. A fourteenth place in 2014–15 however meant relegation to the Verbandsliga for Mechtersheim where it won another league title in 2015–16 and returned to the Oberliga.

== Honours ==
The club's honours:

- Verbandsliga Südwest (V)
  - Champions: 2004, 2016
- Landesliga Südwest-Ost
  - Champions: 2001
- A-Klasse Speyer
  - Champions: 1980, 1986
- B-Klasse Speyer
  - Champions: 1968, 1977

== Recent seasons ==
The recent season-by-season performance of the club:

Season	Division	Tier	Position
2000–01	Landesliga Südwest-Ost	VI	1st ↑
2001–02	Verbandsliga Südwest	V	5th
2002–03	Verbandsliga Südwest	V	4th
2003–04	Verbandsliga Südwest	V	1st ↑
2004–05	Oberliga Südwest	IV	13th
2005–06	Oberliga Südwest	IV	13th
2006–07	Oberliga Südwest	IV	14th
2007–08	Oberliga Südwest	IV	14th
2008–09	Oberliga Südwest	V	9th
2009–10	Oberliga Südwest	V	8th
2010–11	Oberliga Südwest	V	8th
2011–12	Oberliga Südwest	V	11th
2012–13	Oberliga Rheinland-Pfalz/Saar	V	7th
2013–14	Oberliga Rheinland-Pfalz/Saar	V	13th
2014–15	Oberliga Rheinland-Pfalz/Saar	V	15th ↓
2015–16	Verbandsliga Südwest	VI	1st ↑
2016–17	Oberliga Rheinland-Pfalz/Saar	V	

- With the introduction of the Regionalligas in 1994 and the 3. Liga in 2008 as the new third tier, below the 2. Bundesliga, all leagues below dropped one tier. In 2012 the Oberliga Südwest was renamed Oberliga Rheinland-Pfalz/Saar.

↑ Promoted	↓ Relegated
