= Eintracht Braunschweig II =

Association football club in Germany

- Full name: Braunschweiger Turn- und Sportverein Eintracht von 1895 II
- Short name: Eintracht Braunschweig II
- Founded: 15 December 1895; 130 years ago
- Ground: Eintracht-Stadion, B-Platz
- Capacity: 3,000
- League: Oberliga Niedersachsen (V)
- 2025–26: Oberliga Niedersachsen, 12th of 16
- Website: www.eintracht.com
Home colours	Away colours

Eintracht Braunschweig II (sometimes also called Eintracht Braunschweig U-23 and formerly known as Eintracht Braunschweig Amateure) is the amateur team, formerly the reserve team, of German football club Eintracht Braunschweig.

The team has made two appearances in the first round of the DFB-Pokal in 1979–80 and 1980–81. Since 2019 the team has been playing its first season in the tier six Landesliga Braunschweig.

== History ==
The team was one of the founding members of the 1. Spielklasse Herzogtum Braunschweig, at the time one of several first tier leagues in the German Empire. Eintracht Braunschweig II even finished three times as runners-up in the league (in 1905, 1906, and 1913), each time behind the club's first team.

After World War II, the team initially played in the third tier Amateurliga Niedersachsen, gaining promotion to the highest football league in Lower Saxony, the Amateuroberliga Niedersachsen (II), in 1954. Eintracht Amateure won the league in 1956 but, as a reserve side, could not gain promotion into the first tier Oberliga Nord. After the introduction of the Bundesliga, the disbanding of the Oberliga Nord and the formation of the Regionalliga Nord in 1963, the Amateuroberliga Niedersachsen was renamed Amateurliga Niedersachsen and was now at the third level of German football. The team continued to play at the top level of Lower Saxon football until 1975, when they won promotion to the new Oberliga Nord (III), which had been introduced in 1974.

After relegation from the Oberliga in 1979 the team predominantly played in the Niedersachsenliga, interrupted by stints back in the Oberliga in 1983–84 and from 1985 to 1987. In 2003, Eintracht II won promotion to the Oberliga Niedersachsen/Bremen (which had replaced the Oberliga Nord in 1994). When two years later the Oberliga Niedersachsen/Bremen was disbanded again, the team initially missed qualification for the reformed Oberliga Nord, but won promotion back into the Oberliga in 2006.

The team continued to play at the Oberliga level until 2010, when it won its first ever promotion to the Regionalliga Nord (IV). Eintracht II was relegated again after just one season at the new level, but returned to the Regionalliga in 2013, where it played until 2018, when the senior team's relegation to the 3. Liga prompted the reserves' demotion back to the Oberliga. Eintracht closed its under-23 team following the 2018–19 season and replaced it with an amateur team which entered the Landesliga.

In 2013, Ilter Tashkin, who had not yet made an appearance in professional football at the time, became the first ever player to be capped at the senior international level whilst playing for Eintracht Braunschweig II, playing for Azerbaijan. A second player, Eric Veiga, was capped by Luxembourg in 2016.

The team also made two appearances in the German Cup (DFB-Pokal), in 1979–80 when it lost to 1. FC Nürnberg and in 1980–81, when it lost to Rot-Weiß Niebüll. Additionally, the team reached the final of the 1970 German amateur football championship, losing to SC Jülich.

== Honours ==
The team's honours:

- German amateur championship:
  - Runners-up: 1970
- Amateuroberliga Niedersachsen-Ost (II):
  - Champions: 1956
  - Runners-up: 1955
- Amateurliga Niedersachsen, Staffel 4 (Braunschweig) (III):
  - Champions: 1954
- Lower Saxony championship:
  - Champions: 1970, 2000, 2002, 2010, 2013
  - Runners-up: 1985, 2005

== Recent seasons ==
The recent season-by-season performance of the team:

Year	Division	Position
2002–03	Oberliga Niedersachsen/Bremen (IV)	9th
2003–04	Oberliga Niedersachsen/Bremen	10th (relegated)
2004–05	Niedersachsenliga-Ost (V)	1st (promoted)
2005–06	Oberliga Nord (IV)	11th
2006–07	Oberliga Nord	10th
2007–08	Oberliga Nord	10th (relegated)
2008–09	Oberliga Niedersachsen-Ost (V)	3rd
2009–10	Oberliga Niedersachsen-Ost	1st (promoted)
2010–11	Regionalliga Nord (IV)	16th (relegated)
2011–12	Oberliga Niedersachsen (V)	8th
2012–13	Oberliga Niedersachsen	1st (promoted)
2013–14	Regionalliga Nord (IV)	13th
2014–15	Regionalliga Nord	13th
2015–16	Regionalliga Nord	9th
2016–17	Regionalliga Nord	12th
2017–18	Regionalliga Nord	14th (demoted)
2018–19	Oberliga Niedersachsen (V)	4th (withdrawn)
2019–20	Landesliga Braunschweig (VI)	

- With the introduction of the 3. Liga in 2008 as the new third tier, below the 2. Bundesliga, all leagues below dropped one tier.

== Personnel ==
=== Head coaches ===
Name	From	Until
(Germany) Uwe Hain	1997	2009
(Germany) Christian Benbennek	2009	2011
(Germany) Henning Bürger	2011	2018
(Turkey) Deniz Doğan	2018	2019
