= 2015–16 Eintracht Braunschweig season =

Eintracht Braunschweig
2015–16 season
- Chairman: Sebastian Ebel
- Manager: Torsten Lieberknecht
- Stadium: Eintracht-Stadion, Braunschweig, Lower Saxony
- 2. Bundesliga: 8th
- DFB-Pokal: Round of 16
- Top goalscorer: League: Salim Khelifi (8); All: Salim Khelifi (8)
- Highest home attendance: 23,050
- Lowest home attendance: 19,667
- Average home league attendance: 21,191
Home colours	Away colours	Third colours

The 2015–16 Eintracht Braunschweig season was the 122nd season in the club's football history. In 2015–16, the club played in the 2. Bundesliga, the second tier of German football.

== Review and events ==
The 2015–16 season of Eintracht Braunschweig will begin on 15 June 2015 with their first training session.

The draw for the first round of the 2015–16 DFB-Pokal happened on 10 June and paired Braunschweig with 3. Liga team Hallescher FC.

On 30 June 2015, the team headed for an eight-day-long pre-season training camp in Mittersill, Salzburg, Austria.

The draw for the second round of the 2015–16 DFB-Pokal happened on 14 August and paired Braunschweig with Oberliga Baden-Württemberg side SSV Reutlingen 05.

In November 2015, sporting director Marc Arnold announced that the club would not head for a winter training camp this season.

== Matches and results ==
=== Legend ===
Win Tie Loss

=== Friendly matches ===
20 June 2015	Haßloch XI	2–10	Eintracht Braunschweig	Haßloch
13:00	Grässer 27'; Franzreb 48'	Report	Hochscheidt 7'; Decarli 10'; Omladič 53', 80'; Ademi 58', 66', 79'; Schönfeld 63', 85'; Boland 76'	Stadium: Friedrich-Chomas-Stadion am Eichelgarten; Attendance: 900

26 June 2015	Braunschweiger SC Acosta	0–7	Eintracht Braunschweig	Braunschweig
18:30		Report	Khelifi 14'; Ademi 18', 30'; Zuck 34'; Boland 39'; Vrančić 49'; Reichel 78'	Stadium: Konrad-Koch-Stadion; Attendance: 2,113

2 July 2015	Eintracht Braunschweig	2–1	(Ukraine) Shakhtar Donetsk	Mittersill, Austria
18:00	Ofosu-Ayeh 35'; Düker 67'	Report	Tankovskyi 84'	Stadium: Stadion Mittersill; Attendance: 400

4 July 2015	Eintracht Braunschweig	3–1	(Russia) Rubin Kazan	Bischofshofen, Austria
17:00	Düker 17'; Oehrl 78'; Khelifi 88'	Report	Portnyagin 55'

7 July 2015	Eintracht Braunschweig	1–2	(Ukraine) Dynamo Kyiv	Jenbach, Austria
17:30	Düker 14'	Report	Dragović 76'; Sydorchuk 90'	Stadium: Stadion Jenbach

13 July 2015	SV Drochtersen/Assel	0–1	Eintracht Braunschweig	Drochtersen
19:00		Report	Oehrl 17'	Stadium: Kehdinger Stadion; Attendance: 1,500

17 July 2015	Eintracht Braunschweig	1–2	(Spain) Rayo Vallecano	Braunschweig
18:30	Boland 50'	Report	Quini 54'; Miku 89'	Stadium: Eintracht-Stadion; Attendance: 3,740

2 September 2015	MTV Gifhorn	0–2	Eintracht Braunschweig	Gifhorn
18:30		Report	Ademi 22'; Hvilsom 88'	Stadium: Stadion Flutmulde; Attendance: 750

4 September 2015	Germania Halberstadt	0–4	Eintracht Braunschweig	Halberstadt
18:30		Report	Ademi 9'; Zuck 37'; Hochscheidt 71'; Hvilsom 90'	Stadium: Friedensstadion; Attendance: 678

8 October 2015	Lokomotive Leipzig	0–4	Eintracht Braunschweig	Leipzig
18:00		Report	Baffo 7'; Hvilsom 16', 38'; Matuszczyk 83'	Stadium: Bruno-Plache-Stadion; Attendance: 1,197

13 November 2015	Werder Bremen	0–2	Eintracht Braunschweig	Bremen
17:30		Report	Decarli 11'; Schönfeld 78'	Stadium: Weserstadion, Platz 11; Attendance: 827

9 January 2016	FT Braunschweig	0–5	Eintracht Braunschweig	Braunschweig
14:00		Report	Hochscheidt 7'; Zuck 28', 29'; Fiedler 70' (o.g.); Kumbela 87' (pen.)	Stadium: Prinzenparkstadion; Attendance: 935

10 January 2016	Supporters Select XI	2–24	Eintracht Braunschweig	Braunschweig
14:00	Kistner 85'; Riefenberg 89'	Report	Kumbela 12', 15', 42', 44'; Khelifi 17', 20', 33'; Decarli 25'; Kijewski 39', 54'; Pfitzner 50' (pen.); Baghdadi 57'; Schönfeld 58', 78'; Vrančić 64'; Düker 67', 74', 83', 88', 90'; Ademi 72', 87'; Ofosu-Ayeh 75', 81'	Stadium: Sportpark Kennel; Attendance: 700

15 January 2016	SV Wehen Wiesbaden	0–1	Eintracht Braunschweig	Wiesbaden
19:00		Report	Omladič 14'	Stadium: BRITA-Arena; Attendance: 250

17 January 2016	Eintracht Frankfurt	3–3	Eintracht Braunschweig	Frankfurt
14:00	Gaćinović 60'; Fabián 74', 76'	Report	Correia 37'; Ademi 64', 67'	Attendance: 0

22 January 2016	Eintracht Braunschweig	1–2	SC Verl	Braunschweig
15:00	Holtmann 90'	Report	Hecker 20'; Geisler 47'	Stadium: Eintracht-Stadion, F-Platz; Attendance: 100

24 January 2016	Hertha BSC	1–1	Eintracht Braunschweig	Berlin
11:30	Stocker 36'	Report	Schönfeld 3' (pen.)	Stadium: Amateurstadion Olympiapark; Attendance: 0

30 January 2016	Eintracht Braunschweig	2–1	(Denmark) Hobro IK	Braunschweig
14:00	Ofosu-Ayeh 16'; Kumbela 79'	Report	Kirkevold 82'	Stadium: Konrad-Koch-Stadion; Attendance: 300

18 May 2016	TSV Wendezelle	0–8	Eintracht Braunschweig	Wendeburg
19:00		Report	Kumbela 8'; Düker 21', 36'; Ademi 34'; Omladič 45'; Zuck 53'; Holtmann 58'; Khelifi 82'	Stadium: Sportplatz Wendeburg; Attendance: 2,500

19 May 2016	TSV Hillerse	0–7	Eintracht Braunschweig	Hillerse
18:00		Report	Düker 18', 69'; Boland 29'; Kumbela 40'; Zuck 71'; Omladič 87'; Vrančić 90'	Stadium: Sportanlage Hillerse; Attendance: 1,000

=== 2. Bundesliga ===
==== League fixtures and results ====
26 July 2015 1	Eintracht Braunschweig	1–3	SV Sandhausen	Braunschweig
15:30	Hochscheidt 29'	Summary	Hübner 31'; Wooten 41'; Bouhaddouz 65'	Stadium: Eintracht-Stadion; Attendance: 20,680; Referee: Jochen Drees (Münster-Sarmsheim)

31 July 2015 2	1. FC Kaiserslautern	0–0	Eintracht Braunschweig	Kaiserslautern
20:30		Summary		Stadium: Fritz-Walter-Stadion; Attendance: 33,036; Referee: Felix Brych (Munich)

15 August 2015 3	Eintracht Braunschweig	0–2	RB Leipzig	Braunschweig
13:00		Summary	Selke 68'; Forsberg 76'	Stadium: Eintracht-Stadion; Attendance: 21,315; Referee: Deniz Aytekin (Oberasbach)

21 August 2015 4	Arminia Bielefeld	0–2	Eintracht Braunschweig	Bielefeld
18:30		Summary	Matuszczyk 58'; Khelifi 84'	Stadium: SchücoArena; Attendance: 18,383; Referee: René Rohde (Rostock)

30 August 2015 5	Eintracht Braunschweig	6–0	Karlsruher SC	Braunschweig
13:30	Berggreen 9', 64'; Reichel 43', 71'; Peitz 53' (o.g.); Pfitzner 58'	Summary		Stadium: Eintracht-Stadion; Attendance: 20,630; Referee: Tobias Stieler (Hamburg)

13 September 2015 6	FSV Frankfurt	0–3	Eintracht Braunschweig	Frankfurt
13:30		Summary	Reichel 43'; Holtmann 71'; Omladič (red card) 73'; Boland 84'	Stadium: Frankfurter Volksbank Stadion; Attendance: 5,218; Referee: Timo Gerach (Landau)

20 September 2015 7	Eintracht Braunschweig	0–0	FC St. Pauli	Braunschweig
13:30		Summary		Stadium: Eintracht-Stadion; Attendance: 23,050; Referee: Benjamin Brand (Bamberg)

23 September 2015 8	MSV Duisburg	0–5	Eintracht Braunschweig	Duisburg
17:30	Feltscher (red card) 40'	Summary	Boland 12'; Berggreen 53', 68'; Reichel 74'; Khelifi 79'	Stadium: Schauinsland-Reisen-Arena; Attendance: 12,509; Referee: Martin Petersen (Stuttgart)

28 September 2015 9	Eintracht Braunschweig	0–1	SpVgg Greuther Fürth	Braunschweig
20:15	Decarli (red card) 90'	Summary	Žulj 14'	Stadium: Eintracht-Stadion; Attendance: 20,142; Referee: Patrick Ittrich (Hamburg)

4 October 2015 10	Eintracht Braunschweig	2–1	1. FC Union Berlin	Braunschweig
13:30	Boland 16', 79'	Summary	Kessel 27' (pen.)	Stadium: Eintracht-Stadion; Attendance: 22,590; Referee: Sascha Stegemann (Niederkassel)

16 October 2015 11	SC Paderborn 07	2–0	Eintracht Braunschweig	Paderborn
18:30	Stoppelkamp 18'; Proschwitz 81'	Summary		Stadium: Benteler Arena; Attendance: 11,952; Referee: Manuel Gräfe (Berlin)

25 October 2015 12	Eintracht Braunschweig	1–0	1. FC Heidenheim	Braunschweig
13:30	Khelifi 77'	Summary		Stadium: Eintracht-Stadion; Attendance: 20,340; Referee: Sven Jablonski (Bremen)

1 November 2015 13	SC Freiburg	2–2	Eintracht Braunschweig	Freiburg im Breisgau
13:30	Grifo 15'; Petersen 38'	Summary	Mujdža 52' (o.g.); Khelifi 62'	Stadium: Schwarzwald-Stadion; Attendance: 23,100; Referee: Knut Kircher (Rottenburg am Neckar)

8 November 2015 14	Eintracht Braunschweig	0–0	TSV 1860 München	Braunschweig
13:30		Summary		Stadium: Eintracht-Stadion; Attendance: 21,435; Referee: Thorben Siewer (Drolshagen)

23 November 2015 15	1. FC Nürnberg	2–1	Eintracht Braunschweig	Nuremberg
20:15	Kerk 33'; Burgstaller 84'	Summary	Omladič 53'	Stadium: Grundig-Stadion; Attendance: 21,561; Referee: Christian Dingert (Lebecksmühle)

27 November 2015 16	Eintracht Braunschweig	1–0	VfL Bochum	Braunschweig
18:40	Khelifi 41'	Summary	Novikovas (red card) 74'	Stadium: Eintracht-Stadion; Attendance: 21,030; Referee: Guido Winkmann (Kerken)

7 December 2015 17	Fortuna Düsseldorf	1–0	Eintracht Braunschweig	Düsseldorf
20:15	Pohjanpalo 25'; Haggui (red card) 56'	Summary		Stadium: Esprit Arena; Attendance: 22,757; Referee: Christian Dietz (Kronach)

11 December 2015 18	SV Sandhausen	0–2	Eintracht Braunschweig	Sandhausen
18:30		Summary	Berggreen 47'; Khelifi 78'	Stadium: Hardtwaldstadion; Attendance: 5,345; Referee: Benjamin Cortus (Röthenbach an der Pegnitz)

20 December 2015 19	Eintracht Braunschweig	1–1	1. FC Kaiserslautern	Braunschweig
13:30	Hochscheidt 30'	Summary	Čolak 75'	Stadium: Eintracht-Stadion; Attendance: 22,313; Referee: Martin Thomsen (Kleve)

7 February 2016 20	RB Leipzig	2–0	Eintracht Braunschweig	Leipzig
13:30	Forsberg 24'; Compper 30'	Summary		Stadium: Red Bull Arena; Attendance: 28,112; Referee: Felix Zwayer (Berlin)

14 February 2016 21	Eintracht Braunschweig	1–0	Arminia Bielefeld	Braunschweig
13:30	Reichel 5'; Kumbela (red card) 90'	Summary	Behrendt (red card) 89'	Stadium: Eintracht-Stadion; Attendance: 22,235; Referee: Robert Kempter (Sauldorf)

20 February 2016 22	Karlsruher SC	2–2	Eintracht Braunschweig	Karlsruhe
13:00	Manuel Torres 29' (pen.); Sallahi (red card) 60'; Diamantakos 65'	Summary	Boland 22'; Decarli 47'	Stadium: Wildparkstadion; Attendance: 12,746; Referee: Robert Kampka (Mainz)

28 February 2016 23	Eintracht Braunschweig	0–0	FSV Frankfurt	Braunschweig
13:30		Summary		Stadium: Eintracht-Stadion; Attendance: 19,667; Referee: Patrick Alt (Heusweiler)

3 March 2016 24	FC St. Pauli	1–0	Eintracht Braunschweig	Hamburg
20:15	Verhoek 82'	Summary		Stadium: Millerntor-Stadion; Attendance: 29,271; Referee: Benjamin Brand (Bamberg)

6 March 2016 25	Eintracht Braunschweig	1–1	MSV Duisburg	Braunschweig
13:30	Khelifi 60'	Summary	Chanturia 59'	Stadium: Eintracht-Stadion; Attendance: 20,158; Referee: Thorben Siewer (Drolshagen)

11 March 2016 26	SpVgg Greuther Fürth	3–0	Eintracht Braunschweig	Fürth
18:30	Žulj 23', 84'; Stiepermann 58'	Summary		Stadium: Stadion am Laubenweg; Attendance: 8,140; Referee: Timo Gerach (Landau)

18 March 2016 27	1. FC Union Berlin	3–1	Eintracht Braunschweig	Berlin
18:30	Wood 58'; Kreilach 69', 84'	Summary	Tietz 62'	Stadium: Stadion An der Alten Försterei; Attendance: 19,026; Referee: René Rohde (Rostock)

1 April 2016 28	Eintracht Braunschweig	2–1	SC Paderborn 07	Braunschweig
18:30	Holtmann 29'; Hochscheidt 32'	Summary	Stoppelkamp 2'	Stadium: Eintracht-Stadion; Attendance: 20,685; Referee: Günter Perl (Pullach)

8 April 2016 29	1. FC Heidenheim	2–2	Eintracht Braunschweig	Heidenheim an der Brenz
18:30	Schnatterer 49' (pen.); Feick 74'	Summary	Reinhardt 21' (o.g.); Kumbela 41'	Stadium: Voith-Arena; Attendance: 11,500; Referee: Robert Kempter (Sauldorf)

18 April 2016 30	Eintracht Braunschweig	2–2	SC Freiburg	Braunschweig
20:30	Holtmann 54'; Reichel 57'	Summary	Petersen 70'; Kempf 90+4'	Stadium: Eintracht-Stadion; Attendance: 19,810; Referee: Patrick Ittrich (Hamburg)

24 April 2016 31	TSV 1860 München	1–0	Eintracht Braunschweig	Munich
13:30	Okotie (yellow card) 75', (goal) 87'	Summary		Stadium: Allianz Arena; Attendance: 20,800; Referee: Tobias Welz (Wiesbaden)

30 April 2016 32	Eintracht Braunschweig	3–1	1. FC Nürnberg	Braunschweig
13:00	Khelifi 43'; Reichel 59'; Sauer 66'	Summary	Burgstaller 78'	Stadium: Eintracht-Stadion; Attendance: 21,145; Referee: Robert Kampka (Mainz)

8 May 2016 33	VfL Bochum	2–3	Eintracht Braunschweig	Bochum
15:30	Terodde 27', 34'	Summary	Holtmann 8'; Bastians 56' (o.g.); Ademi 62'; Decarli (red card) 88'	Stadium: rewirpowerSTADION; Attendance: 17,899; Referee: Robert Kempter (Sauldorf)

15 May 2016 34	Eintracht Braunschweig	0–2	Fortuna Düsseldorf	Braunschweig
15:30	Reichel (red card) 86'	Summary	Demirbay 74', 83' (pen.)	Stadium: Eintracht-Stadion; Attendance: 23,040; Referee: Daniel Siebert (Berlin)

==== League table ====
Pos	Team	Pld	W	D	L	GF	GA	GD	Pts
6	Union Berlin	34	13	10	11	56	50	+6	49
7	Karlsruher SC	34	12	11	11	35	37	−2	47
8	Eintracht Braunschweig	34	12	10	12	44	38	+6	46
9	Greuther Fürth	34	13	7	14	49	55	−6	46
10	1. FC Kaiserslautern	34	12	9	13	49	47	+2	45

Source: DFB
Rules for classification: 1) Points; 2) Goal difference; 3) Goals scored

=== DFB-Pokal ===
Win Draw Loss

8 August 2015 Round 1	Hallescher FC	0–1	Eintracht Braunschweig	Halle (Saale)
15:30 CEST (UTC+02:00)	Kleineheismann (yellow card) 17'	Summary	Ofosu-Ayeh (yellow card) 21'; Decarli (yellow card) 54'; Zuck 67'	Stadium: Erdgas Sportpark; Attendance: 9,549; Referee: Benjamin Cortus (Röthenbach an der Pegnitz)

28 October 2015 Round 2	SSV Reutlingen	0–4	Eintracht Braunschweig	Reutlingen
20:30 CET (UTC+01:00)		Summary	Holtmann 21', 61'; Berggreen 36'; Ademi 79'	Stadium: Stadion an der Kreuzeiche; Attendance: 7,524; Referee: René Rohde (Rostock)

16 December 2015 Round of 16	VfB Stuttgart	3–2 (a.e.t.)	Eintracht Braunschweig	Stuttgart
19:00 CET (UTC+01:00)	Niedermeier 21'; Werner 99'; Šunjić 118'	Summary	Baffo 6'; Ademi 110'	Stadium: Mercedes-Benz Arena; Attendance: 21,950; Referee: Peter Sippel (Munich)

== Squad ==
=== Current squad ===
As of 31 January 2016

Squad Season 2015–16
No.	Player	Nat.	Birthday	at BTSV since	previous club	League matches	League goals	Cup matches	Cup goals
Goalkeepers
1	Marcel Engelhardt	German	5 Apr 1993	2015	Youth system	0	0	0	0
16	Jasmin Fejzić	Bosnian	15 May 1986	2015	VfR Aalen	1	0	0	0
33	Rafał Gikiewicz	Polish	26 Oct 1987	2014	Śląsk Wrocław	33	0	3	0
Defenders
3	Saulo Decarli	Swiss	4 Feb 1992	2014	Livorno	29	1	3	0
4	Joseph Baffo	Swedish	7 Nov 1992	2015	Halmstads BK	27	0	2	1
17	Phil Ofosu-Ayeh	Ghanaian	15 Sep 1991	2015	VfR Aalen	20	0	3	0
19	Ken Reichel	German	19 Dec 1986	2007	Hamburger SV II	31	7	3	0
24	Maximilian Sauer	German	15 May 1994	2014	Youth system	15	1	1	0
25	Marcel Correia (captain)	Portuguese	16 May 1989	2011	1. FC Kaiserslautern II	14	0	1	0
27	Niko Kijewski	German	28 Mar 1996	2015	Youth system	7	0	0	0
28	Dennis Slamar	German	8 Sep 1994	2015	Youth system	0	0	0	0
36	Mohammad Baghdadi	German	30 Oct 1996	2014	Youth system	0	0	1	0
Midfielders
6	Damir Vrančić	Bosnian	4 Oct 1985	2009	Borussia Dortmund II	3	0	0	0
8	Adam Matuszczyk	Polish	14 Feb 1989	2015	1. FC Köln	29	1	3	0
10	Mirko Boland	German	23 Apr 1987	01/09	MSV Duisburg II	29	5	2	0
11	Jan Hochscheidt	German	4 Oct 1987	2013	FC Erzgebirge Aue	29	3	1	0
12	Nik Omladič	Slovenian	21 Aug 1989	01/15	Olimpija Ljubljana	25	1	3	0
21	Patrick Schönfeld	German	21 Jun 1989	2015	FC Erzgebirge Aue	16	0	2	0
22	Salim Khelifi	Swiss	26 Jan 1994	01/14	Lausanne-Sport	32	8	3	0
30	Hendrick Zuck	German	21 Jul 1990	2014	SC Freiburg	23	0	3	1
31	Marc Pfitzner	German	28 Aug 1984	2007	Youth system	13	1	0	0
38	Gerrit Holtmann	German	25 Mar 1995	04/15	Youth system	30	4	2	2
Strikers
7	Domi Kumbela	Congolese	20 Apr 1984	01/16	SpVgg Greuther Fürth	11	1	0	0
18	Orhan Ademi	Swiss	28 Oct 1991	2012	SC Rheindorf Altach	18	1	2	2
26	Julius Düker	German	4 Jan 1996	2014	Youth system	8	0	0	0
34	Phillip Tietz	German	9 Jul 1997	01/16	Youth system	8	1	0	0
No longer at the club
9	Emil Berggreen	Danish	10 May 1993	01/15	Hobro IK	13	5	2	1
15	Deniz Doğan	Turk	20 Oct 1979	2007	VfB Lübeck	1	0	0	0
20	Torsten Oehrl	German	7 Jan 1986	2013	FC Augsburg	1	0	0	0
23	Mads Dittmer Hvilsom	Danish	23 Aug 1992	2015	Hobro IK	5	0	2	0
Last updated: 15 May 2016

=== Transfers ===
==== Summer ====
In:

No.	Pos.	Nation	Player
1	GK	GER	Marcel Engelhardt (from Eintracht Braunschweig II)
4	DF	SWE	Joseph Baffo (from Halmstads BK)
8	MF	POL	Adam Matuszczyk (from 1. FC Köln)
16	GK	BIH	Jasmin Fejzić (from VfR Aalen)
17	DF	GHA	Phil Ofosu-Ayeh (from VfR Aalen)
18	FW	SUI	Orhan Ademi (loan return from VfR Aalen)
21	MF	GER	Patrick Schönfeld (from FC Erzgebirge Aue)
23	FW	DEN	Mads Dittmer Hvilsom (from Hobro IK)
27	DF	GER	Niko Kijewski (from Eintracht Braunschweig U-19)
28	DF	GER	Dennis Slamar (from Eintracht Braunschweig II)
30	FW	GER	Hendrick Zuck (from SC Freiburg, previously on loan)

Out:

No.	Pos.	Nation	Player
1	GK	GER	Marjan Petković
2	DF	NOR	Vegar Eggen Hedenstad (loan return to SC Freiburg)
4	DF	GER	Matthias Henn (to F.C. Hansa Rostock)
5	DF	GER	Benjamin Kessel (to 1. FC Union Berlin)
7	FW	NOR	Håvard Nielsen (loan return to RB Salzburg)
8	DF	TUR	Deniz Doğan (retired)
13	MF	GER	Raffael Korte (to 1. FC Union Berlin)
14	FW	KOR	Ryu Seung-woo (loan return to Bayer 04 Leverkusen)
15	MF	GER	Norman Theuerkauf (to 1. FC Heidenheim)
20	FW	GER	Torsten Oehrl (to SV Wehen Wiesbaden)
21	DF	GER	Jan Washausen (to SV Elversberg)
27	FW	GER	Gianluca Korte (released, previously on loan at VfR Aalen)
32	FW	GER	Dennis Kruppke (retired)
35	FW	GER	Haris Hyseni (to Eintracht Braunschweig II)

==== Winter ====
In:

No.	Pos.	Nation	Player
7	FW	COD	Domi Kumbela (from SpVgg Greuther Fürth)
34	FW	GER	Phillip Tietz (from Eintracht Braunschweig U-19)

Out:

No.	Pos.	Nation	Player
9	FW	DEN	Emil Berggreen (to 1. FSV Mainz 05)
23	FW	DEN	Mads Dittmer Hvilsom (on loan to SK Brann)

== Management and coaching staff ==
Since 12 May 2008 Torsten Lieberknecht is the manager of Eintracht Braunschweig.

Position	Staff
Manager	Torsten Lieberknecht
Assistant manager	Darius Scholtysik
Assistant manager	Henning Bürger
Assistant manager/athletic trainer	Jürgen Rische
Goalkeeping coach	Alexander Kunze
Sporting director	Marc Arnold
