= 2016–17 Eintracht Braunschweig season =

Eintracht Braunschweig
2016–17 season
- Chairman: Sebastian Ebel
- Manager: Torsten Lieberknecht
- Stadium: Eintracht-Stadion, Braunschweig, Lower Saxony
- 2. Bundesliga: 3rd
- DFB-Pokal: First round
- Top goalscorer: League: Domi Kumbela (13); All: Domi Kumbela (13)
- Highest home attendance: 23,369
- Lowest home attendance: 19,630
- Average home league attendance: 21,430
Home colours	Away colours	Third colours

The 2016–17 Eintracht Braunschweig season is the 123rd season in the club's football history. In 2016–17 the club plays in the 2. Bundesliga, the second tier of German football.

== Review and events ==
The 2016–17 season of Eintracht Braunschweig began on 27 June 2016 with their first training session. For this season, the club wore a special anniversary crest, to commemorate the 50th anniversary of the club's 1966–67 Bundesliga title.

The draw for the first round of the 2016–17 DFB-Pokal happened on 18 June and paired Braunschweig with fellow 2. Bundesliga team Würzburger Kickers.

On 20 July 2016, the team headed for a nine-day-long pre-season training camp in Herxheim bei Landau/Pfalz, Rhineland-Palatinate.

On 15 January 2017, the team headed for a week-long winter training camp in Mijas, Province of Málaga, Spain.

== Matches and results ==
=== Legend ===
Win Tie Loss

=== Friendly matches ===
3 July 2016	Braunschweiger Zeitung Select XI	1–9	Eintracht Braunschweig	Braunschweig
15:00	Gehde 23'	Report	Tietz 30'; Moll 32'; Omladič 39'; Khelifi 45'; Abdullahi 59'; Zuck 60', 65'; Hochscheidt 66'; Kumbela 81'	Stadium: Eintracht-Stadion; Attendance: 4,000

8 July 2016	Eintracht Northeim	0–3	Eintracht Braunschweig	Northeim
18:30		Report	Zuck 28'; Kumbela 66'; Abdullahi 71'	Stadium: Gustav-Wegner-Stadion; Attendance: 1,280

9 July 2016	Eintracht Braunschweig	3–3	(Denmark) OB	Salzgitter
16:00	Abdullahi 39', 57'; Biada 85'	Report	Festersen 35'; Jönsson 49'; Dieudonne 71'	Stadium: Stadion am Salzgittersee; Attendance: 1,000

15 July 2016	KSV Hessen Kassel	0–0	Eintracht Braunschweig	Kassel
18:30		Report		Stadium: Auestadion; Attendance: 824

17 July 2016	Eintracht Braunschweig	2–1	(Czech Republic) Bohemians 1905	Schöningen
15:30	Hochscheidt 12'; Abdullahi 45'	Report	Čížek 65'	Stadium: Elmstadion; Attendance: 1,802

23 July 2016	SV Waldhof Mannheim	2–7	Eintracht Braunschweig	Mannheim
18:00	Koep 30'; Sommer 45' (pen.)	Report	Abdullahi 1'; Hernández 11'; Omladič 49', 54', 76'; Tietz 68', 81'	Stadium: Carl-Benz-Stadion; Attendance: 1,367

29 July 2016	Eintracht Braunschweig	4–1	(France) SC Bastia	Braunschweig
18:00	Abdullahi 4'; Biada 61'; Kumbela 72', 89'	Report	Acheampong 71'	Stadium: Eintracht-Stadion; Attendance: 2,300

30 July 2016	Eintracht Braunschweig	1–2	Hertha BSC	Salzgitter
14:30	Ademi 17'	Report	Haraguchi 10'; Allagui 81' (pen.)	Stadium: Stadion am Salzgittersee; Attendance: 1,148

2 September 2016	Eintracht Braunschweig	3–1	FC Viktoria 1889 Berlin	Braunschweig
18:00	Kumbela 2', 18'; Biada 70'	Report	Benyamina 15' (pen.)	Stadium: Eintracht-Stadion, B-Platz; Attendance: 236

10 November 2016	Eintracht Braunschweig	1–1	SV Babelsberg 03	Braunschweig
13:00	Hochscheidt 43'	Report	Steinborn 53'	Stadium: Konrad-Koch-Stadion; Attendance: 250

7 January 2017	Eintracht Braunschweig	2–0	SC Paderborn 07	Braunschweig
14:00	Nyman 5', 26'	Report		Stadium: Eintracht-Stadion, F-Platz; Attendance: 270

14 January 2017	Eintracht Braunschweig	2–1	SV Werder Bremen	Braunschweig
15:30	Decarli 17'; Hernández 64'	Report	Gnabry 29'	Stadium: Eintracht-Stadion; Attendance: 4,550

17 January 2017	Eintracht Braunschweig	2–0	(Switzerland) FC Luzern	Mijas, Spain
15:00	Tietz 78'; Hochscheidt 87'	Report		Stadium: La Cala Resort; Attendance: 150

20 January 2017	Dinamo București (Romania)	1–0	Eintracht Braunschweig	Marbella, Spain
15:00	Palić 88' (pen.)	Report		Stadium: Estadio Municipal de Marbella

22 March 2017	VfL Oythe	0–2	Eintracht Braunschweig	Vechta
18:00		Report	Khelifi 25'; Schönfeld 38' (pen.)	Stadium: Stadion An der Hasenweide; Attendance: 850

24 March 2017	Eintracht Braunschweig	6–0	Berliner AK 07	Braunschweig
15:00	Reichel 18'; Hernández 35'; Zuck 37'; Abdullahi 40', 45'; Kumbela 55'	Report		Stadium: Eintracht-Stadion, B-Platz; Attendance: 140

=== 2. Bundesliga ===
==== League table ====
Pos	Team	Pld	W	D	L	GF	GA	GD	Pts	Promotion, qualification or relegation
1	VfB Stuttgart (C, P)	34	21	6	7	63	37	+26	69	Promotion to Bundesliga
2	Hannover 96 (P)	34	19	10	5	51	32	+19	67	Promotion to Bundesliga
3	Eintracht Braunschweig	34	19	9	6	50	36	+14	66	Qualification to promotion play-offs
4	Union Berlin	34	18	6	10	51	39	+12	60	
5	Dynamo Dresden	34	13	11	10	53	46	+7	50	

Source: DFB
Rules for classification: 1) Points; 2) Goal difference; 3) Goals scored
(C) Champions; (P) Promoted

==== Results summary ====
Overall								Home						Away					
Pld	W	D	L	GF	GA	GD	Pts	W	D	L	GF	GA	GD	W	D	L	GF	GA	GD
34	19	9	6	50	36	+14	66	13	3	1	35	17	+18	6	6	5	15	19	−4

Source: Bundesliga

==== Results by round ====
Round	1	2	3	4	5	6	7	8	9	10	11	12	13	14	15	16	17	18	19	20	21	22	23	24	25	26	27	28	29	30	31	32	33	34
Ground	H	A	H	A	H	A	H	A	H	H	A	H	A	H	A	H	A	A	H	A	H	A	H	A	H	A	A	H	A	H	A	H	A	H
Result	W	W	W	W	W	L	W	D	W	W	L	D	D	W	L	W	D	D	L	D	D	W	D	W	W	W	D	W	L	W	W	W	L	W
Position	2	2	1	1	1	1	1	1	1	1	1	1	1	1	2	1	1	2	3	3	4	4	4	4	3	2	3	2	4	2	2	2	3	3

Source: Bundesliga
A = Away; H = Home; W = Win; D = Draw; L = Loss

==== Matches ====
7 August 2016 1	Eintracht Braunschweig	2–1	Würzburger Kickers	Braunschweig
15:30	Khelifi 43'; Biada 54'	Report	Soriano 61'; Taffertshofer (red card) 68'	Stadium: Eintracht-Stadion; Attendance: 20,390; Referee: Sascha Stegemann (Niederkassel)

13 August 2016 2	FC St. Pauli	0–2	Eintracht Braunschweig	Hamburg
15:30		Report	Kumbela 40'; Biada 67'	Stadium: Millerntor-Stadion; Attendance: 29,546; Referee: Bastian Dankert (Rostock)

28 August 2016 3	Eintracht Braunschweig	6–1	1. FC Nürnberg	Braunschweig
13:30	Kumbela 43'; Decarli 45+1', 55'; Bulthuis 64' (o.g.); Omladič 87'; Nyman 88'	Report	Burgstaller 8'	Stadium: Eintracht-Stadion; Attendance: 20,840; Referee: Felix Zwayer (Berlin)

9 September 2016 4	Erzgebirge Aue	0–2	Eintracht Braunschweig	Aue
18:30		Report	Kumbela 10', 89'	Stadium: Sparkassen-Erzgebirgsstadion; Attendance: 8,050; Referee: Daniel Schlager (Rastatt)

17 September 2016 5	Eintracht Braunschweig	2–1	SV Sandhausen	Braunschweig
13:00	Nyman 62'; Hernández 74'	Report	Sukuta-Pasu 90+2'	Stadium: Eintracht-Stadion; Attendance: 19,967; Referee: Benjamin Cortus (Röthenbach an der Pegnitz)

20 September 2016 6	VfB Stuttgart	2–0	Eintracht Braunschweig	Stuttgart
17:30	Šunjić 18'; Großkreutz 64'	Report		Stadium: Mercedes-Benz Arena; Attendance: 36,800; Referee: Christian Dingert (Lebecksmühle)

23 September 2016 7	Eintracht Braunschweig	2–1	Fortuna Düsseldorf	Braunschweig
18:30	Kumbela 29'; Reichel 33'	Report	Kiesewetter 78'	Stadium: Eintracht-Stadion; Attendance: 21,555; Referee: Sven Jablonski (Bremen)

2 October 2016 8	1. FC Heidenheim	1–1	Eintracht Braunschweig	Heidenheim an der Brenz
13:30	Kleindienst 27'	Report	Kumbela 76'	Stadium: Voith-Arena; Attendance: 12,500; Referee: Thorben Siewer (Drolshagen)

17 October 2016 9	Eintracht Braunschweig	1–0	1. FC Kaiserslautern	Braunschweig
20:15	Omladič 18'	Report		Stadium: Eintracht-Stadion; Attendance: 20,790; Referee: Markus Schmidt (Stuttgart)

23 October 2016 10	Eintracht Braunschweig	1–0	SpVgg Greuther Fürth	Braunschweig
13:30	Hernández 59'	Report	Sararer (red card) 29'	Stadium: Eintracht-Stadion; Attendance: 20,900; Referee: Patrick Ittrich (Hamburg)

28 October 2016 11	Dynamo Dresden	3–2	Eintracht Braunschweig	Dresden
18:45	Kutschke 69', 74', 81'	Report	Hernández 10'; Kumbela 52'	Stadium: DDV-Stadion; Attendance: 29,097; Referee: Daniel Siebert (Berlin)

6 November 2016 12	Eintracht Braunschweig	2–2	Hannover 96	Braunschweig
13:30	Reichel 17'; Hernández 36'	Report	Harnik 38'; Karaman 66'	Stadium: Eintracht-Stadion; Attendance: 23,000; Referee: Felix Zwayer (Berlin)

18 November 2016 13	VfL Bochum	1–1	Eintracht Braunschweig	Bochum
18:30	Quaschner 84'	Report	Kumbela 68'	Stadium: Vonovia Ruhrstadion; Attendance: 17,488; Referee: Christian Dietz (Kronach)

27 November 2016 14	Eintracht Braunschweig	2–1	1860 Munich	Braunschweig
13:30	Nyman 16'; Kumbela 65'	Report	Olić 72'	Stadium: Eintracht-Stadion; Attendance: 20,850; Referee: Patrick Alt (Heusweiler)

5 December 2016 15	Union Berlin	2–0	Eintracht Braunschweig	Berlin
20:15	Hedlund 56'; Daube 82'	Report		Stadium: Stadion An der Alten Försterei; Attendance: 20,312; Referee: Christian Dingert (Lebecksmühle)

11 December 2016 16	Eintracht Braunschweig	3–2	Arminia Bielefeld	Braunschweig
13:30	Nyman 30'; Kumbela 55', 76'	Report	Voglsammer 4'; Klos 75'	Stadium: Eintracht-Stadion; Attendance: 20,760; Referee: Robert Kampka (Mainz)

17 December 2016 17	Karlsruher SC	0–0	Eintracht Braunschweig	Karlsruhe
13:00		Report		Stadium: Wildparkstadion; Attendance: 12,096; Referee: Florian Badstübner (Windsbach)

28 January 2017 18	Würzburger Kickers	1–1	Eintracht Braunschweig	Würzburg
13:00	Rama 34'	Report	Nyman 90+1'	Stadium: flyeralarm Arena; Attendance: 10,152; Referee: Daniel Schlager (Rastatt)

5 February 2017 19	Eintracht Braunschweig	1–2	FC St. Pauli	Braunschweig
13:30	Abdullahi 90+6'	Report	Sobiech 7'; Şahin 72'	Stadium: Eintracht-Stadion; Attendance: 22,775; Referee: Christian Dietz (Kronach)

10 February 2017 20	1. FC Nürnberg	1–1	Eintracht Braunschweig	Nuremberg
18:30	Sabiri 53'	Report	Nyman 23'	Stadium: Stadion Nürnberg; Attendance: 23,152; Referee: Marco Fritz (Korb)

17 February 2017 21	Eintracht Braunschweig	1–1	Erzgebirge Aue	Braunschweig
18:30	Ofosu-Ayeh 10'	Report	Nazarov 57' (pen.)	Stadium: Eintracht-Stadion; Attendance: 19,630; Referee: Lasse Koslowski (Berlin)

24 February 2017 22	SV Sandhausen	0–1	Eintracht Braunschweig	Sandhausen
18:30		Report	Boland 71'	Stadium: Hardtwaldstadion; Attendance: 4,721; Referee: Sören Storks (Velen)

6 March 2017 23	Eintracht Braunschweig	1–1	VfB Stuttgart	Braunschweig
20:15	Reichel 42' (pen.)	Report	Carlos Mané 3'; Kamiński (red card) 41'	Stadium: Eintracht-Stadion; Attendance: 23,000; Referee: Benjamin Brand (Bamberg)

13 March 2017 24	Fortuna Düsseldorf	1–2	Eintracht Braunschweig	Düsseldorf
20:15	Bormuth 37'	Report	Nyman 60'; Hernández 89'	Stadium: Esprit Arena; Attendance: 20,168; Referee: Marco Fritz (Korb)

17 March 2017 25	Eintracht Braunschweig	3–2	1. FC Heidenheim	Braunschweig
18:30	Boland 33'; Nyman 78'; Reichel 90+2'	Report	Schnatterer 3'; Feick 73' (pen.)	Stadium: Eintracht-Stadion; Attendance: 20,000; Referee: Thorben Siewer (Drolshagen)

2 April 2017 26	1. FC Kaiserslautern	0–1	Eintracht Braunschweig	Kaiserslautern
13:30		Report	Boland 79'	Stadium: Fritz-Walter-Stadion; Attendance: 23,756; Referee: Matthias Jöllenbeck (Freiburg im Breisgau)

5 April 2017 27	SpVgg Greuther Fürth	0–0	Eintracht Braunschweig	Fürth
17:30		Report		Stadium: Sportpark Ronhof Thomas Sommer; Attendance: 8,035; Referee: Robert Kampka (Mainz)

10 April 2017 28	Eintracht Braunschweig	1–0	Dynamo Dresden	Braunschweig
20:15	Reichel 90+2'	Report		Stadium: Eintracht-Stadion; Attendance: 22,880; Referee: Daniel Siebert (Berlin)

15 April 2017 29	Hannover 96	1–0	Eintracht Braunschweig	Hanover
13:00	Füllkrug 32'	Report		Stadium: HDI Arena; Attendance: 42,700; Referee: Sascha Stegemann (Niederkassel)

23 April 2017 30	Eintracht Braunschweig	2–0	VfL Bochum	Braunschweig
13:30	Nyman 46', 87'	Report		Stadium: Eintracht-Stadion; Attendance: 21,650; Referee: Florian Badstübner (Windsbach)

30 April 2017 31	1860 Munich	0–1	Eintracht Braunschweig	Munich
13:30		Report	Nyman 55'	Stadium: Allianz Arena; Attendance: 39,500; Referee: Sören Storks (Velen)

8 May 2017 32	Eintracht Braunschweig	3–1	Union Berlin	Braunschweig
20:15	Reichel 6', 64'; Kumbela 75'	Report	Punčec (red card) 54'; Thiel 65'	Stadium: Eintracht-Stadion; Attendance: 23,325; Referee: Tobias Stieler (Hamburg)

14 May 2017 33	Arminia Bielefeld	6–0	Eintracht Braunschweig	Bielefeld
15:30	Hochscheidt 13' (o.g.); Börner 24'; Yabo 65', 67', 76'; Staude 71'	Report		Stadium: Schüco-Arena; Attendance: 24,138; Referee: Deniz Aytekin (Oberasbach)

21 May 2017 34	Eintracht Braunschweig	2–1	Karlsruher SC	Braunschweig
15:30	Kumbela 2'; Biada 34'	Report	Thoelke 15'	Stadium: Eintracht-Stadion; Attendance: 22,000; Referee: Robert Kampka (Mainz)

=== Promotion play-offs ===
==== First leg ====
25 May 2017	VfL Wolfsburg	1–0	Eintracht Braunschweig	Wolfsburg
20:30 CEST	Gómez 35' (pen.)	Report		Stadium: Volkswagen Arena; Attendance: 29,100; Referee: Sascha Stegemann (Niederkassel)

==== Second leg ====
29 May 2017	Eintracht Braunschweig	0–1	VfL Wolfsburg	Braunschweig
20:30 CEST		Report	Vieirinha 49'	Stadium: Eintracht-Stadion; Attendance: 23,000; Referee: Tobias Stieler (Hamburg)

=== DFB-Pokal ===
20 August 2016 First round	Würzburger Kickers	1–0 (a.e.t.)	Eintracht Braunschweig	Würzburg
15:30	Soriano 103'	Report		Stadium: flyeralarm Arena; Attendance: 6,384; Referee: Jochen Drees (Münster-Sarmsheim)

== Squad ==
=== Current squad ===
As of 31 January 2017

Squad Season 2016–17
No.	Player	Nat.	Birthday	at BTSV since	previous club	League matches	League goals	Cup matches	Cup goals	Play-off matches	Play-off goals
Goalkeepers
1	Marcel Engelhardt	German	5 Apr 1993	2015	Youth system	0	0	0	0	0	0
16	Jasmin Fejzić	Bosnian	15 May 1986	2015	VfR Aalen	34	0	1	0	2	0
Defenders
3	Saulo Decarli	Swiss	4 Feb 1992	2014	Livorno	28	2	0	0	2	0
4	Joseph Baffo	Swedish	7 Nov 1992	2015	Halmstads BK	15	0	1	0	0	0
5	Gustav Valsvik	Norwegian	26 May 1993	2016	Strømsgodset	29	0	1	0	2	0
17	Phil Ofosu-Ayeh	Ghanaian	15 Sep 1991	2015	VfR Aalen	16	1	1	0	0	0
19	Ken Reichel	German	19 Dec 1986	2007	Hamburger SV II	32	7	1	0	2	0
24	Maximilian Sauer	German	15 May 1994	2014	Youth system	15	0	0	0	2	0
25	Marcel Correia (captain)	Portuguese	16 May 1989	2011	1. FC Kaiserslautern II	15	0	0	0	0	0
26	Michael Schulze	German	13 Jan 1989	01/17	Youth system	1	0	0	0	0	0
27	Niko Kijewski	German	28 Mar 1996	2015	Youth system	7	0	0	0	0	0
Midfielders
6	Quirin Moll	German	21 Jan 1991	2016	Dynamo Dresden	29	0	1	0	1	0
8	Adam Matuszczyk	Polish	14 Feb 1989	2015	1. FC Köln	1	0	0	0	0	0
9	Julius Biada	German	3 Nov 1992	2016	Fortuna Köln	21	3	1	0	0	0
10	Mirko Boland	German	23 Apr 1987	01/09	MSV Duisburg II	27	3	1	0	2	0
11	Jan Hochscheidt	German	4 Oct 1987	2013	FC Erzgebirge Aue	13	0	1	0	2	0
12	Nik Omladič	Slovenian	21 Aug 1989	01/15	Olimpija Ljubljana	25	2	1	0	2	0
21	Patrick Schönfeld	German	21 Jun 1989	2015	FC Erzgebirge Aue	17	0	1	0	2	0
22	Salim Khelifi	Swiss	26 Jan 1994	01/14	Lausanne-Sport	18	1	1	0	1	0
23	Onel Hernández	German	1 Feb 1993	2016	VfL Wolfsburg II	34	5	0	0	2	0
30	Hendrick Zuck	German	21 Jul 1990	2014	SC Freiburg	17	0	1	0	1	0
Strikers
7	Domi Kumbela	Congolese	20 Apr 1984	01/16	SpVgg Greuther Fürth	33	13	1	0	1	0
15	Christoffer Nyman	Swedish	5 Oct 1992	2016	IFK Norrköping	31	11	0	0	2	0
20	Suleiman Abdullahi	Nigerian	10 Dec 1996	2016	Viking	13	1	0	0	1	0
34	Phillip Tietz	German	9 Jul 1997	01/16	Youth system	2	0	0	0	1	0
No longer at the club
18	Orhan Ademi	Swiss	28 Oct 1991	2012	SC Rheindorf Altach	1	0	0	0	0	0
Last updated: 31 May 2017

=== Transfers ===
==== Summer ====
In:

No.	Pos.	Nation	Player
5	DF	(Norway) NOR	Gustav Valsvik (from Strømsgodset)
6	MF	(Germany) GER	Quirin Moll (from Dynamo Dresden)
9	MF	(Germany) GER	Julius Biada (from SC Fortuna Köln)
15	FW	(Sweden) SWE	Christoffer Nyman (from IFK Norrköping)
20	FW	(Nigeria) NGA	Suleiman Abdullahi (from Viking FK)
23	MF	(Germany) GER	Onel Hernández (from VfL Wolfsburg II)

Out:

No.	Pos.	Nation	Player
6	MF	(Bosnia and Herzegovina) BIH	Damir Vrančić (to Hallescher FC)
18	FW	(Switzerland) SUI	Orhan Ademi (to SV Ried)
26	FW	(Germany) GER	Julius Düker (to 1. FC Magdeburg)
28	DF	(Germany) GER	Dennis Slamar (to FC Carl Zeiss Jena)
31	MF	(Germany) GER	Marc Pfitzner (to SV Werder Bremen II)
33	GK	(Poland) POL	Rafał Gikiewicz (to SC Freiburg)
36	DF	(Germany) GER	Mohammad Baghdadi (to Eintracht Braunschweig II)
38	MF	(Germany) GER	Gerrit Holtmann (to 1. FSV Mainz 05)
--	FW	(Denmark) DEN	Mads Dittmer Hvilsom (on loan to Esbjerg fB, previously on loan at SK Brann)

==== Winter ====
In:

No.	Pos.	Nation	Player
26	DF	(Germany) GER	Michael Schulze (from Eintracht Braunschweig II)

== Management and coaching staff ==
Since 12 May 2008 Torsten Lieberknecht is the manager of Eintracht Braunschweig.

Position	Staff
Manager	Torsten Lieberknecht
Assistant manager	Darius Scholtysik
Assistant manager/athletic trainer	Jürgen Rische
Goalkeeping coach	Alexander Kunze
Sporting director	Marc Arnold
