= 2012–13 Arminia Bielefeld season =

Arminia Bielefeld
2012–13 season
- Manager: Stefan Krämer
- Stadium: Bielefelder Alm, Bielefeld, NRW
- 3. Liga: 2nd
- DFB-Pokal: Second round
- Top goalscorer: League: Fabian Klos (20); All: Fabian Klos (20)
- Average home league attendance: 10,329

The 2012–13 Arminia Bielefeld season is the 108th season in the club's football history.

== Review and events ==
In 2012–13 the club plays in the 3. Liga, the third tier of German football. It is the club's second season in this league, having been relegated from the 2. Fußball-Bundesliga in 2011.

The club also took part in the 2012–13 edition of the DFB-Pokal, the German Cup, where it reached the second round and will face Bundesliga side Bayer Leverkusen next.

Arminia Bielefeld also takes part in the 2012–13 edition of the Westphalia Cup, having reached the third round after a 3–1 win over FC Gütersloh in the second round.

== Matches ==
=== Legend ===
Win	Draw	Loss

=== 3. Liga ===
Match	Date	Time	Opponent	Venue	Result (Note: Arminia Bielefeld's score shown first)	Scorers	Attendance	Referee	Ref.
1	20 July 2012	20:15	Alemannia Aachen	Home	1–1	Hille 22'	12,110	Dankert	
2	28 July 2012	14:00	Borussia Dortmund II	Away	1–1	Schönfeld 19'	5,500	Christ	
3	3 August 2012	19:00	1. FC Saarbrücken	Home	3–2	Klos 32', 38', 90+3'	7,423	Blos	
4	8 August 2012	19:00	Kickers Offenbach	Away	3–1	Klos 2', Hille 4', Appiah 87'	6,643	Rohde	
5	11 August 2012	14:00	Karlsruher SC	Home	1–0	Klos 33'	8,094	Dietz	
6	25 August 2012	14:00	Rot-Weiß Erfurt	Away	2–0	Salger 26', Testroet 72'	4,412	Kunsmann	
7	29 August 2012	19:00	Stuttgarter Kickers	Home	1–0	Klos 52'	9,090	Ostheimer	
8	1 September 2012	14:00	SpVgg Unterhaching	Away	2–3	Klos 58', Appiah 60'	2,100	Göpferich	
9	15 September 2012	14:00	SV Babelsberg 03	Home	3–0	Schönfeld 44', Klos 47', 64' (pen.)	7,402	Schmickartz	
10	22 September 2012	14:00	Preußen Münster	Away	0–4	—	14,512	Welz	
11	25 September 2012	19:00	Chemnitzer FC	Home	0–0	—	5,871	Jablonski	
12	29 September 2012	14:00	SV Darmstadt 98	Away	3–1	Burmeister 35' (pen.), Testroet 53', Hille 78'	5,100	Steinberg	
13	6 October 2012	14:00	Hansa Rostock	Home	0–1	—	9,365	Hartmann	
14	20 October 2012	14:00	Wehen Wiesbaden	Away	1–0	Rahn 8'	2,963	Gerach	
15	27 October 2012	14:00	1. FC Heidenheim	Home	1–0	Salger 32'	6,828	Aytekin	
16	3 November 2012	14:00	Hallescher FC	Away	2–2	Klos 36', Hübener 41' (pen.)	6,934	Blos	
17	10 November 2012	14:00	VfB Stuttgart II	Home	1–1	Testroet 66'	6,262	Aarnink	
18	17 November 2012	14:00	VfL Osnabrück	Away	0–0	—	16,000	Zwayer	
19	24 November 2012	14:00	Wacker Burghausen	Home	3–0	Rahn 9', Appiah 60', Klos 64'	6,451	Willenborg	
20	1 December 2012	14:00	Alemannia Aachen	Away	1–2	Hille 58'	12,837	Unger	
21	8 December 2012	14:00	Borussia Dortmund II	Home	4–2	Rahn 34', Klos 70', 74', Müller 82'	7,598	Göpferich	
23	25 January 2013	19:00	Kickers Offenbach	Home	3–1	Klos 16', Hornig 54', Hille 75'	7,560	Siebert	
24	2 February 2013	14:00	Karlsruher SC	Away	0–0	—	11,460	Welz	
25	9 February 2013	14:00	Rot-Weiß Erfurt	Home	2–0	Hille 23', Schütz 71'	7,211	Wingenbach	
22	20 February 2013	19:00	1. FC Saarbrücken	Away	4–2	Klos 15', 34', Testroet 68', Glasner 90'	3,036	Gerach	
27	23 February 2013	14:00	SpVgg Unterhaching	Home	3–0	Klos 13', Hille 25', Glasner 90'	7,027	Alt	
28	2 March 2013	14:00	SV Babelsberg 03	Away	2–0	Rahn 28', Jerat 84'	3,696	Kunzmann	
29	9 March 2013	14:00	Preußen Münster	Home	1–1	Hille 20'	26,026	Weiner	
30	16 March 2013	14:00	Chemnitzer FC	Away	1–0	Klos 70'	4,750	Ostheimer	
26	23 March 2013	15:00	Stuttgarter Kickers	Away	1–1	Klos 56'	3,440	Kempter	
31	30 March 2013	14:00	SV Darmstadt 98	Home	0–0	—	10,081	Stein	
32	6 April 2013	14:00	Hansa Rostock	Away	2–0	Müller 47', Hornig 60'	9,000	Fritz	
33	13 April 2013	14:00	Wehen Wiesbaden	Home	3–1	Klos 45+1', Schönfeld 71', Rahn 75'	10,339	Rohde	
34	20 April 2013	14:00	1. FC Heidenheim	Away	0–3	—	9,100	Brand	
35	27 April 2013	14:00	Hallescher FC	Home	2–1	Testroet 6', Kojola 89' (o.g.)	14,435	Winkmann	
36	3 May 2013	18:00	VfB Stuttgart II	Away	1–0	Rahn 41'	1,100	Aarnink	
37	11 May 2013	13:30	VfL Osnabrück	Home	1–0	Hille 56'	26,500	Stark	
38	18 May 2013	13:30	Wacker Burghausen	Away	0–1	—	3,200	Fritz	

=== DFB-Pokal ===
Round	Date	Time	Opponent	Venue	Result	Scorers	Attendance	Referee	Ref.
First round	19 August 2012	16:00	SC Paderborn	Home	3–1	Schütz 55', Schönfeld 86', Hübener 90+3' (pen.)	18,587	Wingenbach	
Second round	31 October 2012	19:00	Bayer Leverkusen	Home	2–3 (a.e.t.)	Hille 11', Schütz 82'	24,771	Drees	
