= Hendrick Zuck =

German footballer

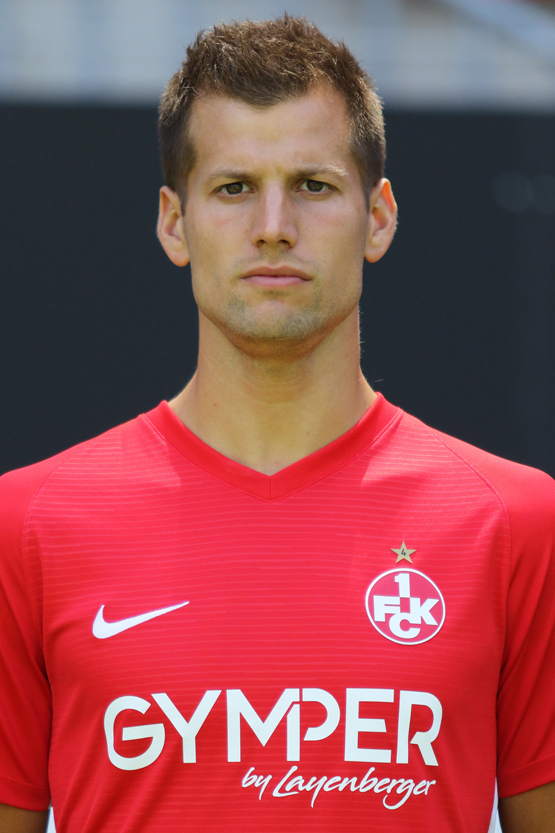
- Zuck with 1. FC Kaiserslautern in 2019

Personal information
- Date of birth: 21 July 1990 (age 36)
- Place of birth: Püttlingen, West Germany
- Height: 1.76 m (5 ft 9 in)
- Position: Left winger

Team information
- Current team: 1. FC Kaiserslautern II

Youth career
- 1992–2004: SC Großrosseln
- 2004–2009: Borussia Neunkirchen

Senior career*
Years	Team	Apps	(Gls)
2009–2010	Borussia Neunkirchen	53	(8)
2010–2012	1. FC Kaiserslautern II	61	(12)
2012–2013	1. FC Kaiserslautern	18	(4)
2013–2015	SC Freiburg	2	(0)
2013–2014	→ SC Freiburg II	30	(6)
2014–2015	→ Eintracht Braunschweig (loan)	31	(3)
2015–2018	Eintracht Braunschweig	57	(1)
2018–2025	1. FC Kaiserslautern	141	(13)
2025–	1. FC Kaiserslautern II	0	(0)
- * Club domestic league appearances and goals as of 18 May 2025

Hendrick Zuck (born 21 July 1990) is a German professional footballer who plays as a left winger for 1. FC Kaiserslautern II.

== Career ==
=== Early career ===
Zuck began his career at SC Großrosseln in 1992, where he was managed by his father. In 2004, he moved to Borussia Neunkirchen in the Oberliga Südwest, where he played for the youth team, before being promoted to the senior team. Zuck made his debut on 5 August 2008, coming on as a substitute in a 2–0 home loss against FC 08 Homburg. He scored his first goal on 8 April 2009 in a 4–1 away win against TuS Mechtersheim.

=== 1. FC Kaiserslautern ===
On 23 May 2010, Zuck joined 1. FC Kaiserslautern on a free transfer. He was placed in the club's reserve team. During the beginning of the 2012–13 season, Zuck was promoted to the club's senior team, where he signed his first professional contract, a two-year deal until June 2014. He made his debut on 6 August 2012 in a 3–3 home draw against 1. FC Union Berlin, where he scored the club's third goal, giving Kaiserslautern a 3–2 lead, before Marc Pfertzel equalised in injury time for Union Berlin.

=== SC Freiburg ===
During the winter break of the 2012–13 season, Zuck transferred to Bundesliga side SC Freiburg.

=== Eintracht Braunschweig ===
On 11 June 2014, it was announced that Zuck would join Eintracht Braunschweig on a one-year loan deal for the 2014–15 2. Bundesliga season. The loan deal was made permanent in May 2015.

=== Return to 1. FC Kaiserslautern ===
In May 2018, 1. FC Kaiserslautern announced Zuck would return to the club for the 2018–19 season having agreed a contract until 2021.

== Career statistics ==
As of match played 1 August 2020

Appearances and goals by club, season and competition
Club	Season	League			Cup		Other (Note: Includes DFB-Supercup.)		Total	
Club	Season	Division	Apps	Goals	Apps	Goals	Apps	Goals	Apps	Goals
Borussia Neunkirchen	2008–09		30	4	–		–		30	4
Borussia Neunkirchen	2009–10		23	4	–		–		23	4
Borussia Neunkirchen	Total		53	8	0	0	0	0	53	8
1. FC Kaiserslautern II	2010–11	Regionalliga West	26	5	–		–		26	5
1. FC Kaiserslautern II	2011–12	Regionalliga West	35	7	–		–		35	7
1. FC Kaiserslautern II	Total		61	12	0	0	0	0	61	12
1. FC Kaiserslautern	2012–13	2. Bundesliga	18	4	1	1	–		19	5
SC Freiburg	2013–14	Bundesliga	2	0	1	2	0	0	3	2
Eintracht Braunschweig	2014–15	2. Bundesliga	31	3	3	0	–		34	3
Eintracht Braunschweig	2015–16	2. Bundesliga	23	0	3	1	–		26	1
Eintracht Braunschweig	2016–17	2. Bundesliga	17	0	1	0	1	0	19	0
Eintracht Braunschweig	2017–18	2. Bundesliga	17	1	1	0	–		18	1
Eintracht Braunschweig	Total		88	4	8	1	1	0	97	5
1. FC Kaiserslautern	2018–19	3. Liga	21	3	1	0	–		22	3
1. FC Kaiserslautern	2019–20	3. Liga	24	2	1	0	–		25	2
1. FC Kaiserslautern	Total		45	5	2	0	0	0	47	5
Career total			267	33	12	4	1	0	280	37
