= Maximilian Sauer =

German footballer (born 1994)

Personal information
- Date of birth: 15 May 1994 (age 32)
- Place of birth: Salzgitter, Germany
- Height: 1.77 m (5 ft 10 in)
- Position: Right-back

Team information
- Current team: FSV Schöningen
- Number: 24

Youth career
- SV Innerstetal
- Fortuna Lebenstedt
- 2009–2013: VfL Wolfsburg

Senior career*
Years	Team	Apps	(Gls)
2013–2014	KSV Hessen Kassel	24	(0)
2014–2018	Eintracht Braunschweig II	28	(3)
2014–2018	Eintracht Braunschweig	49	(1)
2018–2020	Greuther Fürth	47	(0)
2018–2020	Greuther Fürth II	1	(0)
2020–2021	MSV Duisburg	31	(1)
2021–2023	HB Køge	23	(0)
2024	SV Innerstetal		
2024–	FSV Schöningen	39	(1)
- * Club domestic league appearances and goals as of 22 September 2026

Maximilian Sauer (born 15 May 1994) is a German professional footballer who plays as a right-back for Regionalliga Nord club FSV Schöningen.

== Career ==
Between 2009 and 2013, Sauer played for the youth teams of VfL Wolfsburg. In 2013, he was part of Wolfsburg's Under 19 Bundesliga winning squad.

In the 2013–2014 season, Sauer started his senior career at Regionalliga Südwest club KSV Hessen Kassel. Before the 2014–2015 season, he transferred to Eintracht Braunschweig's reserve side in the Regionalliga Nord.

On the 15th matchday of the 2014–15 2. Bundesliga season, he made his professional debut for Eintracht's senior side, playing the full 90 minutes in a match against 1. FC Nürnberg.

In the summer of 2020, he moved to MSV Duisburg. After one season, he signed for HB Køge. Sauer left Køge at the end of the 2022-23 season.

== Career statistics ==
=== Club ===
As of match played 22 May 2021

Appearances and goals by club, season and competition
Club	Season	League			Cup		Other		Total	
Club	Season	Division	Apps	Goals	Apps	Goals	Apps	Goals	Apps	Goals
Hessen Kassel	2013–14	Regionalliga Südwest	24	0	—		—		24	0
Eintracht Braunschweig II	2014–15	Regionalliga Nord	20	2	—		—		20	2
Eintracht Braunschweig II	2015–16	Regionalliga Nord	2	0	—		—		2	0
Eintracht Braunschweig II	2016–17	Regionalliga Nord	6	1	—		—		6	1
Eintracht Braunschweig II	Total		52	3	0	0	0	0	52	3
Eintracht Braunschweig	2014–15	2. Bundesliga	6	0	1	0	—		7	0
Eintracht Braunschweig	2015–16	2. Bundesliga	15	1	1	0	—		16	1
Eintracht Braunschweig	2016–17	2. Bundesliga	15	0	0	0	2 (Note: Appearances in the 2. Bundeliga promotion play-offs)	0	17	0
Eintracht Braunschweig	2017–18	2. Bundesliga	13	0	1	0	—		14	0
Eintracht Braunschweig	Total		49	1	3	0	2	0	54	1
Greuther Fürth	2018–19	2. Bundesliga	31	0	0	0	—		31	0
Greuther Fürth	2019–20	2. Bundesliga	16	0	1	0	—		17	0
Greuther Fürth	Total		47	0	1	0	0	0	48	0
MSV Duisburg	2020–21	3. Liga	31	1	1	0	—		32	1
MSV Duisburg	2021–22	3. Liga	0	0	—		—		0	0
MSV Duisburg	Total		31	1	1	0	0	0	32	1
Career total			203	5	5	0	2	0	210	5
