= Patrick Schönfeld =

German footballer

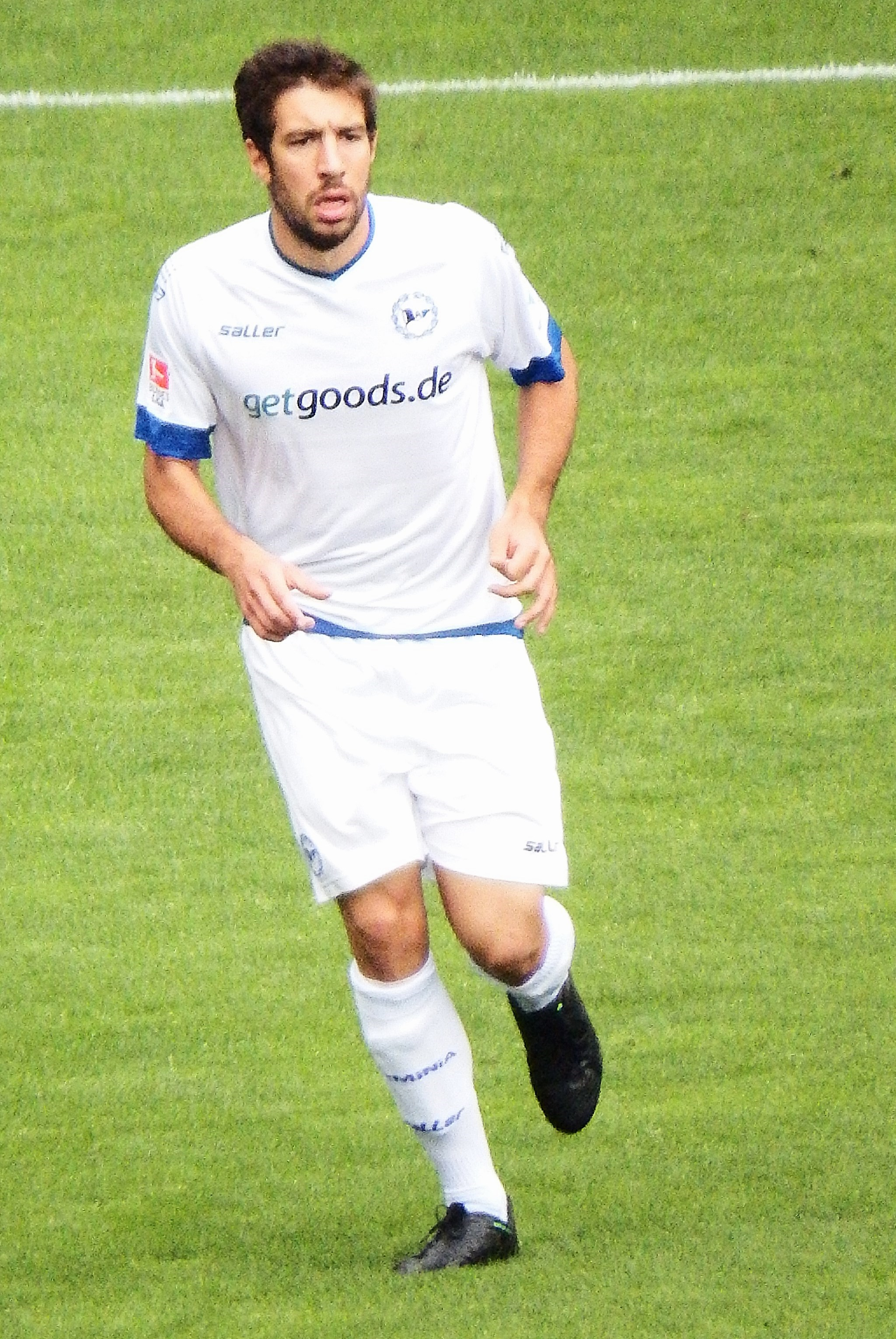
- Schönfeld with Arminia Bielefeld in August 2013

Personal information
- Date of birth: 21 June 1989 (age 37)
- Place of birth: Nuremberg, West Germany
- Height: 1.86 m (6 ft 1 in)
- Position: Midfielder

Team information
- Current team: 1. FC Nürnberg (U12 manager)

Youth career
- 1995–1996: FC Ludwigschorgast
- 1996–2003: 1. FC Nürnberg
- 2003–2006: 1. SC Feucht
- 2006–2008: SK Lauf

Senior career*
Years	Team	Apps	(Gls)
2008–2009	FSV Erlangen-Bruck	28	(8)
2009–2011	Rot-Weiß Oberhausen	46	(0)
2011–2014	Arminia Bielefeld	100	(8)
2014–2015	Erzgebirge Aue	27	(2)
2015–2018	Eintracht Braunschweig	45	(1)
2015–2018	→ Eintracht Braunschweig II	4	(1)
2018–2020	Wehen Wiesbaden	18	(2)
Total		268	(22)

Managerial career
- 2022–: 1. FC Nürnberg (U12 manager)
- * Club domestic league appearances and goals

Patrick Schönfeld (born 21 June 1989) is a German former professional footballer who played as a midfielder.

== Career ==
Schönfeld was born in Nuremberg. In 2015, he joined Eintracht Braunschweig from Erzgebirge Aue on a free transfer. Previously, he had played professionally for Rot-Weiß Oberhausen and Arminia Bielefeld.

== Post-playing career ==
After retiring in the summer 2020, Schönfeld started working in the Marketing business. Ahead of the 2022–23 season, he was appointed U12 manager at his former club, 1. FC Nürnberg.

== Career statistics ==
Appearances and goals by club, season and competition
Club	Season	League			Cup		Other		Total	
Club	Season	Division	Apps	Goals	Apps	Goals	Apps	Goals	Apps	Goals
Rot-Weiß Oberhausen	2009–10	2. Bundesliga	22	0	2	0	—		24	0
Rot-Weiß Oberhausen	2010–11	2. Bundesliga	24	0	1	0	—		25	0
Rot-Weiß Oberhausen	Total		46	0	3	0	0	0	49	0
Arminia Bielefeld	2011–12	3. Liga	35	2	1	0	—		36	2
Arminia Bielefeld	2012–13	3. Liga	33	3	2	1	—		35	4
Arminia Bielefeld	2013–14	2. Bundesliga	32	3	2	0	2 (Note: Appearances in 2014 2. Bundesliga play-offs)	0	36	3
Arminia Bielefeld	Total		100	8	5	1	2	0	107	9
Erzgebirge Aue	2014–15	2. Bundesliga	27	2	1	0	—		28	2
Eintracht Braunschweig	2015–16	2. Bundesliga	16	0	2	0	—		18	0
Eintracht Braunschweig	2016–17	2. Bundesliga	17	0	1	0	2 (Note: Appearances in 2017 Bundesliga play-offs)	0	20	0
Eintracht Braunschweig	2017–18	2. Bundesliga	12	1	0	0	—		12	1
Eintracht Braunschweig	Total		45	1	3	0	2	0	50	1
Eintracht Braunschweig II	2015–16	Regionalliga Nord	1	0	—		—		1	0
Eintracht Braunschweig II	2016–17	Regionalliga Nord	2	1	—		—		2	1
Eintracht Braunschweig II	2017–18	Regionalliga Nord	1	0	—		—		1	0
Eintracht Braunschweig II	Total		4	1	0	0	0	0	4	1
Wehen Wiesbaden	2018–19	3. Liga	15	2	2	0	1 (Note: Appearance in 2019 2. Bundesliga play-offs)	0	19	2
Wehen Wiesbaden	2018–19	2. Bundesliga	3	0	0	0	—		3	0
Wehen Wiesbaden	Total		18	2	2	0	1	0	21	2
Career total			240	14	14	1	5	0	259	15
