= Marcel Engelhardt =

German footballer (born 1993)

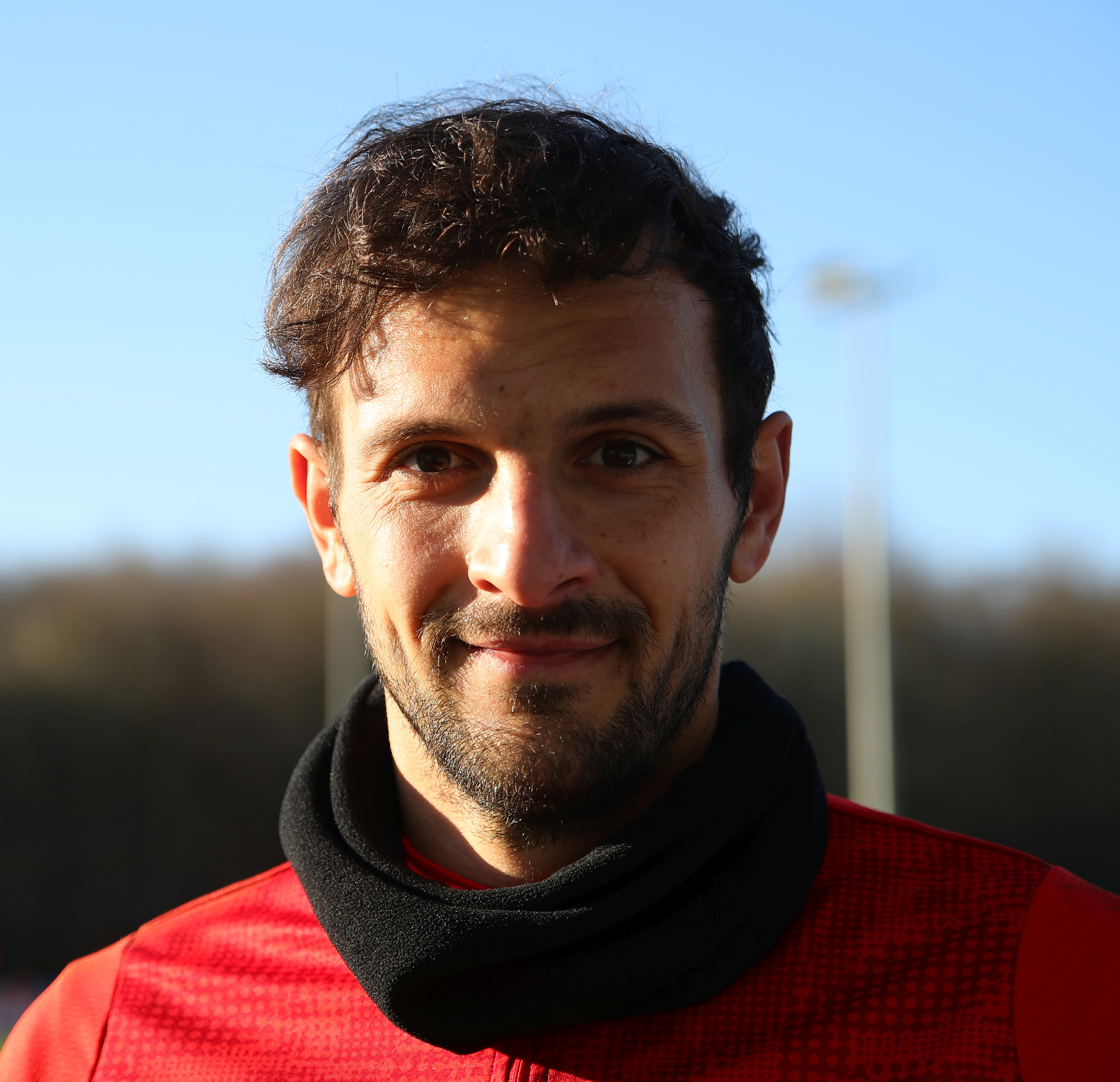
- Engelhardt in 2026

Personal information
- Date of birth: 5 April 1993 (age 33)
- Place of birth: Greven, Germany
- Height: 1.91 m (6 ft 3 in)
- Position: Goalkeeper

Team information
- Current team: Holstein Kiel
- Number: 31

Youth career
- TSV Ratekau
- –2008: VfB Lübeck
- 2008–2012: Hamburger SV

Senior career*
Years	Team	Apps	(Gls)
2012	VfB Lübeck	6	(0)
2012	VfB Lübeck II	1	(0)
2013	TSV Havelse	12	(0)
2013–	Eintracht Braunschweig II	99	(0)
2015–2021	Eintracht Braunschweig	25	(0)
2021–2022	Maritzburg United	45	(0)
2022–2023	FSV Zwickau	5	(0)
2023–	Holstein Kiel	1	(0)
- * Club domestic league appearances and goals as of 22 May 2024

Marcel Engelhardt (born 5 April 1993) is a German professional footballer who plays as a goalkeeper for 2. Bundesliga club Holstein Kiel.

== Career ==
In January 2021, Engelhardt left 2. Bundesliga club Eintracht Braunschweig to join Maritzburg United of the Premier Soccer League.

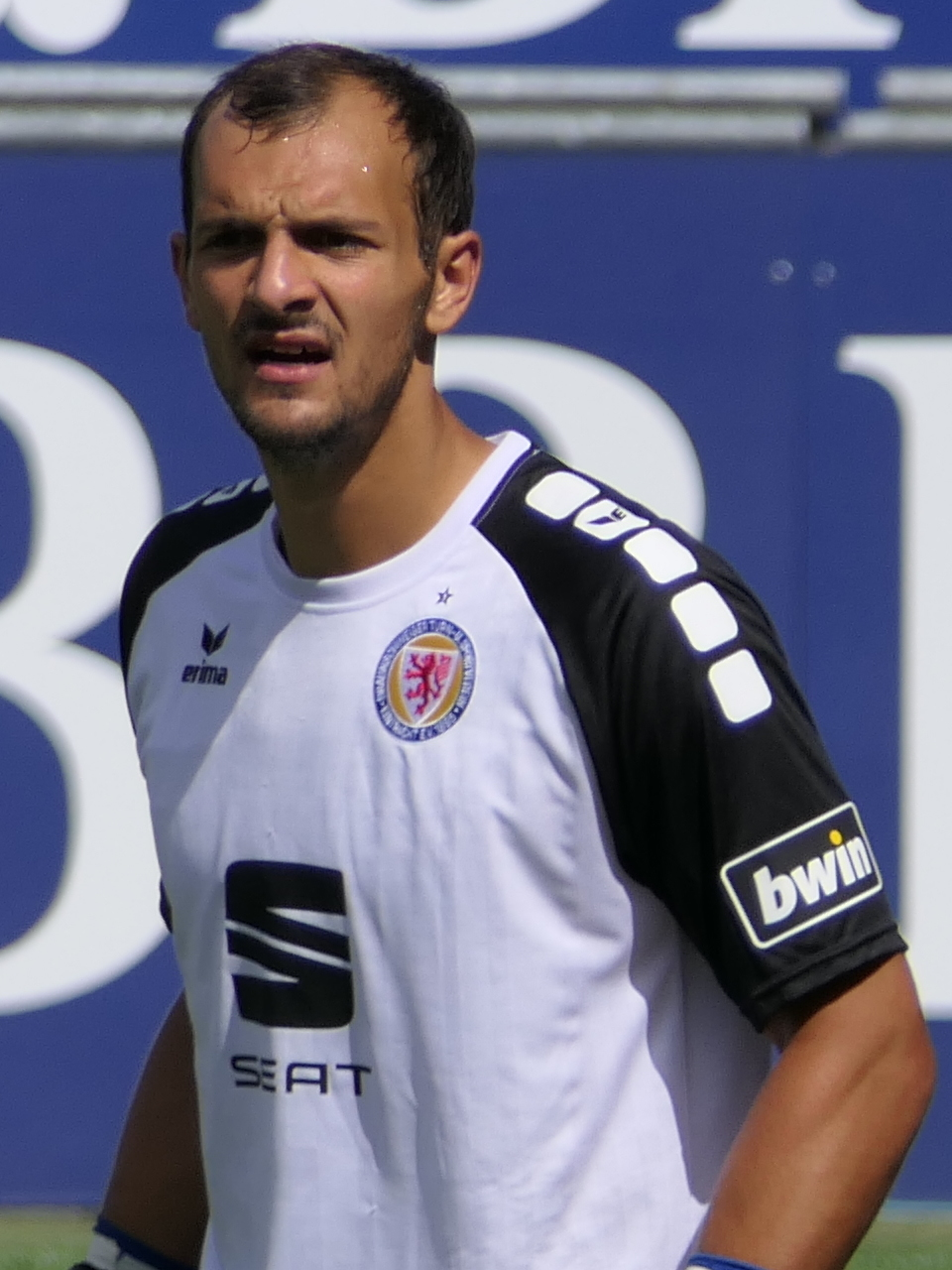
Engelhardt with Eintracht Braunschweig in 2018

== Career statistics ==
As of match played 17 May 2025

Appearances and goals by club, season and competition
Club	Season	League			Cup		Other		Total	
Club	Season	Division	Apps	Goals	Apps	Goals	Apps	Goals	Apps	Goals
VfB Lübeck	2012–13	Regionalliga Nord	6	0	—		2 (Note: Appearance(s) in Schleswig-Holstein Cup)	0	8	0
TSV Havelse	2012–13	Regionalliga Nord	12	0	—		—		12	0
Eintracht Braunschweig II	2013–14	Regionalliga Nord	29	0	—		—		29	0
Eintracht Braunschweig II	2014–15	Regionalliga Nord	33	0	—		—		33	0
Eintracht Braunschweig II	2015–16	Regionalliga Nord	28	0	—		—		28	0
Eintracht Braunschweig II	2016–17	Regionalliga Nord	8	0	—		—		8	0
Eintracht Braunschweig II	2017–18	Regionalliga Nord	1	0	—		—		1	0
Eintracht Braunschweig II	Total		99	0	0	0	0	0	99	0
Eintracht Braunschweig	2015–16	2. Bundesliga	0	0	0	0	—		0	0
Eintracht Braunschweig	2016–17	2. Bundesliga	0	0	0	0	0	0	0	0
Eintracht Braunschweig	2017–18	2. Bundesliga	1	0	0	0	—		1	0
Eintracht Braunschweig	2018–19	3. Liga	13	0	1	0	1 (Note: Appearance in Lower Saxony Cup)	0	15	0
Eintracht Braunschweig	2019–20	3. Liga	11	0	—		1	0	12	0
Eintracht Braunschweig	Total		25	0	1	0	2	0	28	0
Maritzburg United	2020–21	DStv Premiership	16	0	2	0	—		18	0
Maritzburg United	2021–22	DStv Premiership	29	0	1	0	—		30	0
Maritzburg United	Total		45	0	3	0	0	0	48	0
FSV Zwickau	2022–23	3. Liga	5	0	—		1 (Note: Appearance in Saxony Cup)	0	6	0
Holstein Kiel	2023–24	2. Bundesliga	1	0	0	0	—		1	0
Holstein Kiel	2024–25	Bundesliga	0	0	0	0	—		0	0
Holstein Kiel	Total		1	0	0	0	0	0	1	0
Career total			193	0	4	0	5	0	202	0
