= Adam Matuszczyk =

Polish footballer (born 1989)

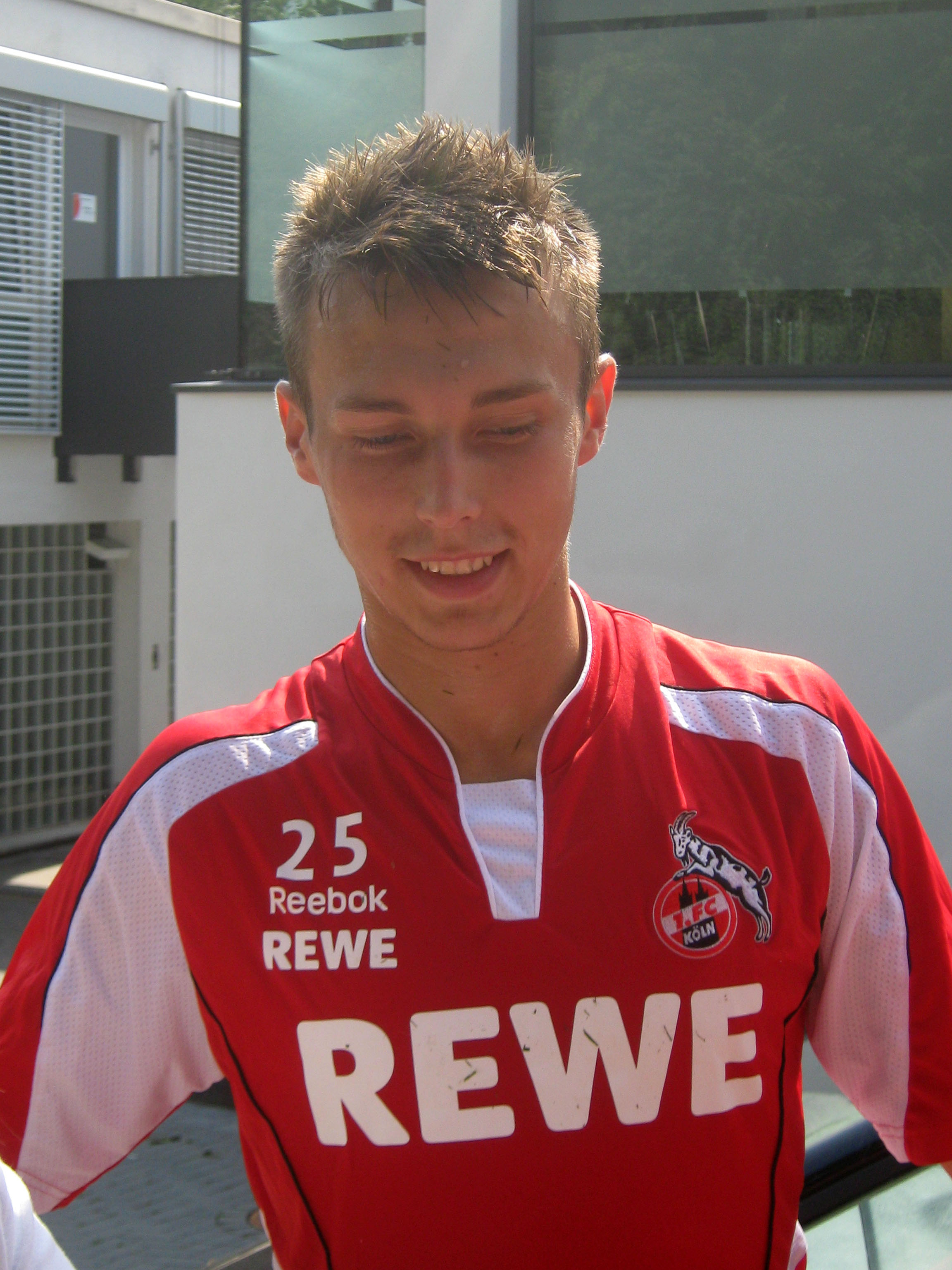

Personal information
- Full name: Adam Matuszczyk
- Date of birth: 14 February 1989 (age 37)
- Place of birth: Gliwice, Poland
- Height: 1.83 m (6 ft 0 in)
- Position: Midfielder

Team information
- Current team: Schwarz-Weiß Düren

Youth career
- 1998–2000: SpVgg Merzig
- 2000–2003: VfB Dillingen
- 2003–2008: 1. FC Köln

Senior career*
| Years | Team | Apps | (Gls) |
| 2008–2015 | 1. FC Köln II | 37 | (4) |
| 2010–2015 | 1. FC Köln | 102 | (5) |
| 2012 | → Fortuna Düsseldorf (loan) | 8 | (1) |
| 2015–2017 | Eintracht Braunschweig | 30 | (1) |
| 2017–2019 | Zagłębie Lubin | 43 | (0) |
| 2017–2018 | Zagłębie Lubin II | 4 | (0) |
| 2019–2020 | KFC Uerdingen | 35 | (1) |
| 2020–2025 | 1. FC Düren | 114 | (8) |
| 2025–2026 | Türkischer SV Düren | 23 | (2) |
| 2026– | Schwarz-Weiß Düren | 0 | (0) |

International career
| 2009–2010 | Poland U21 | 4 | (0) |
| 2010–2013 | Poland | 21 | (1) |
- * Club domestic league appearances and goals as of 21:36, 1 June 2026 (UTC)

Adam Matuszczyk ([ˈadam maˈtuʂt͡ʂɨk]; born 14 February 1989) is a Polish professional footballer who plays as a defensive midfielder for German club Schwarz-Weiß Düren. A former member of the Poland national team, he can also be deployed as a left midfielder.

== Career ==
Matuszczyk began his career with SpVgg Merzig and later joined VfB Dillingen. After successful years with the youth teams of VfB Dillingen he was scouted by 1. FC Köln in the summer of 2003 and was promoted to the reserve team in the 2008–09 season. In the first half of the season, Matuszczyk earned 11 caps and, on 3 February 2009, was promoted to the Bundesliga team of 1. FC Köln. He made his Bundesliga debut on 27 February 2010 against Bayer Leverkusen. His first Bundesliga goals came on 10 April, when he scored twice to give Köln a 2–0 away win versus Hoffenheim. In January 2012, he was loaned to Fortuna Düsseldorf.

In May 2015, Matuszczyk signed a three-year contract with Eintracht Braunschweig. However, after the 2016–17 2. Bundesliga season, he transferred to Polish club Zagłębie Lubin.

On 16 June 2017, he signed a contract with Ekstraklasa side Zagłębie Lubin.

On 31 January 2019, Matuszczyk joined Uerdingen 05 on a short term deal.

On 7 October 2020, Matuszczyk joined Mittelrheinliga side 1. FC Düren.

== International career ==
The former U-21 team player earned his first call up to the Poland national football team on 19 December 2009 for the King's Cup in Thailand. However, he was retained by his club due to the tournament's scheduling outside of the official FIFA calendar for international matches. On 4 May 2010, he was called up for the friendly games in May 2010. He made his international debut on 29 May 2010 against Finland. His first international goal came against the United States in October 2010.

== Personal life ==
He was born in Gliwice, Poland and moved to Germany in 1991 at the age of two. Thus, he also has a German passport. He is married to wife Denise with whom he has a son, Lennox.

Born as Adam Matuszczyk, he is known in Germany as Adam Matuschyk.

== Career statistics ==
=== Club ===
As of match played 31 May 2026

Appearances and goals by club, season and competition
| Club | Season | League | | | National cup (Note: Includes DFB-Pokal, Polish Cup) | | Other | | Total | | Ref. |
| Club | Season | League | Apps | Goals | Apps | Goals | Apps | Goals | Apps | Goals | Ref. |
|---|---|---|---|---|---|---|---|---|---|---|---|
| Köln II | 2008–09 | Regionalliga West | 25 | 3 | — | | — | | 25 | 3 | |
| Köln II | 2009–10 | Regionalliga West | 11 | 1 | — | | — | | 11 | 1 | |
| Köln II | 2014–15 | Regionalliga West | 1 | 0 | — | | — | | 1 | 0 | |
| Köln II | Total | | 37 | 4 | — | | — | | 37 | 4 | — |
| Köln | 2009–10 | Bundesliga | 9 | 2 | 0 | 0 | — | | 9 | 2 | |
| Köln | 2010–11 | Bundesliga | 24 | 2 | 3 | 0 | — | | 27 | 2 | |
| Köln | 2011–12 | Bundesliga | 9 | 0 | 1 | 0 | — | | 10 | 0 | |
| Köln | 2012–13 | 2. Bundesliga | 28 | 1 | 2 | 0 | — | | 30 | 1 | |
| Köln | 2013–14 | 2. Bundesliga | 22 | 0 | 3 | 1 | — | | 25 | 1 | |
| Köln | 2014–15 | Bundesliga | 10 | 0 | 2 | 0 | — | | 12 | 0 | |
| Köln | Totals | | 102 | 5 | 11 | 1 | — | | 113 | 6 | — |
| Fortuna Düsseldorf (loan) | 2011–12 | 2. Bundesliga | 8 | 1 | 0 | 0 | 2 (Note: Appearances in 2. Bundesliga promotion play-offs) | 0 | 10 | 1 | |
| Eintracht Braunschweig | 2015–16 | 2. Bundesliga | 29 | 1 | 3 | 0 | — | | 32 | 1 | |
| Eintracht Braunschweig | 2016–17 | 2. Bundesliga | 1 | 0 | 0 | 0 | — | | 1 | 0 | |
| Eintracht Braunschweig | Total | | 30 | 1 | 3 | 0 | — | | 33 | 1 | — |
| Zagłębie Lubin | 2017–18 | Ekstraklasa | 28 | 0 | 3 | 0 | — | | 31 | 0 | |
| Zagłębie Lubin | 2018–19 | Ekstraklasa | 15 | 0 | 0 | 0 | — | | 15 | 0 | |
| Zagłębie Lubin | Total | | 43 | 0 | 3 | 0 | — | | 46 | 0 | — |
| Zagłębie Lubin II | 2017–18 | III liga | 3 | 0 | 0 | 0 | — | | 3 | 0 | |
| Zagłębie Lubin II | 2018–19 | III liga | 1 | 0 | 0 | 0 | — | | 1 | 0 | |
| Zagłębie Lubin II | Total | | 4 | 0 | 0 | 0 | — | | 4 | 0 | — |
| Uerdingen 05 | 2018–19 | 3. Liga | 10 | 0 | 0 | 0 | — | | 10 | 0 | — |
| Uerdingen 05 | 2019–20 | 3. Liga | 25 | 1 | 0 | 0 | — | | 25 | 1 | — |
| Uerdingen 05 | Total | | 35 | 1 | 0 | 0 | — | | 35 | 1 | — |
| 1. FC Düren | 2020–21 | Mittelrheinliga | 0 (Note: Season cancelled due to COVID) | 0 | 1 | 0 | — | | 1 | 0 | — |
| 1. FC Düren | 2021–22 | Mittelrheinliga | 30 | 1 | 0 | 0 | — | | 30 | 1 | — |
| 1. FC Düren | 2022–23 | Regionalliga | 28 | 0 | 0 | 0 | — | | 28 | 0 | — |
| 1. FC Düren | 2023–24 | Regionalliga | 31 | 2 | 0 | 0 | — | | 31 | 2 | — |
| 1. FC Düren | 2024–25 | Regionalliga | 25 | 5 | 0 | 0 | — | | 25 | 5 | — |
| 1. FC Düren | Total | | 114 | 8 | 1 | 0 | — | | 115 | 8 | — |
| Türkischer SV Düren | 2025–26 | Bezirksliga | 23 | 2 | — | | — | | 23 | 2 | — |
| Career total | | | 396 | 22 | 18 | 1 | 2 | 0 | 416 | 23 | — |

=== International ===
Appearances and goals by national team and year
| National team | Year | Apps | Goals |
|---|---|---|---|
| Poland | 2010 | 7 | 1 |
| Poland | 2011 | 9 | 0 |
| Poland | 2012 | 4 | 0 |
| Poland | 2013 | 1 | 0 |
| Total | | 21 | 1 |

Scores and results list Poland's goal tally first, score column indicates score after each Matuszczyk goal.

List of international goals scored by Adam Matuszczyk
| No. | Date | Venue | Opponent | Score | Result | Competition |
|---|---|---|---|---|---|---|
| 1. | 9 October 2010 | Soldier Field, Chicago, United States | United States | 1–1 | 2–2 | Friendly |

== Honours ==
Köln

- 2. Bundesliga: 2013–14
