= Marc Arnold =

German-South African footballer (born 1970)

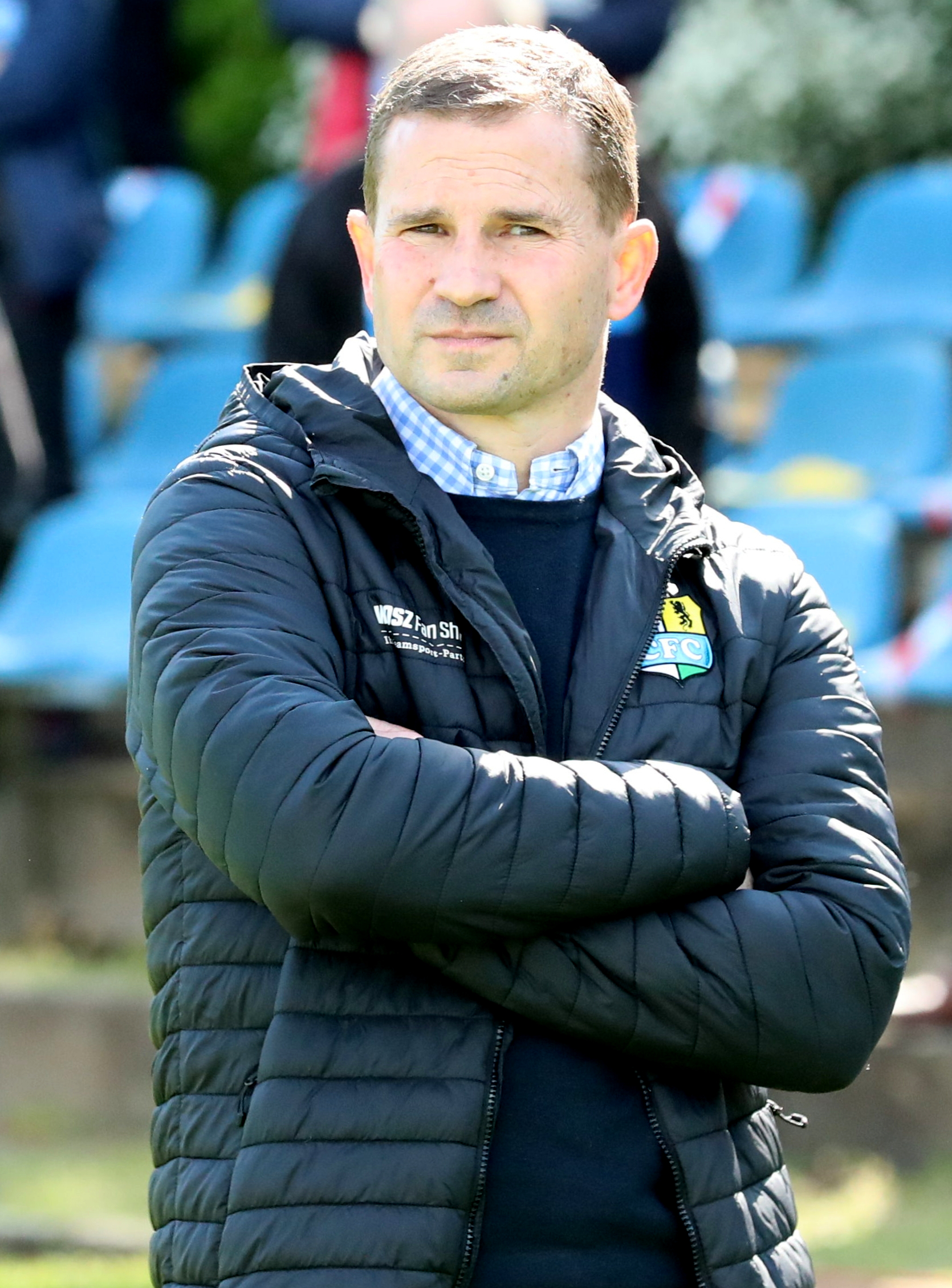

Personal information
- Date of birth: 19 September 1970 (age 56)
- Place of birth: Johannesburg, South Africa
- Height: 1.69 m (5 ft 7 in)
- Position: Midfielder

Youth career
- Rot-Weiß Lintorf
- –1991: Stuttgarter Kickers

Senior career*
Years	Team	Apps	(Gls)
1991–1992	Stuttgarter Kickers	2	(0)
1992–1993	Freiburger FC	26	(8)
1993–1994	SSV Ulm 1846	34	(24)
1994–1995	Borussia Dortmund	9	(0)
1995–1998	Hertha BSC	65	(5)
1998–2000	Karlsruher SC	27	(3)
2000–2003	LR Ahlen	68	(17)
2003–2005	Eintracht Braunschweig	26	(4)
2005–2007	KSV Hessen Kassel	47	(14)
- * Club domestic league appearances and goals

Marc Arnold (born 19 September 1970) is a German-South African former footballer who spent his entire professional career in Germany. Since his retirement as a player, he has worked as director of football at Hessen Kassel (from 2007 until 2008) and Eintracht Braunschweig (since 2008).

== Career ==
=== Club career ===
Born in Johannesburg, South Africa, Arnold began his playing career at Stuttgarter Kickers and Freiburger FC, and played for SSV Ulm 1846 between 1993 and 1994. He then joined Borussia Dortmund for the 1994–95 season. After winning the German championship with Dortmund, making nine league appearances during the campaign, Arnold left for Hertha BSC. After two seasons in the 2. Bundesliga the team won promotion to the Bundesliga, there Arnold made 26 appearances and scored two goals during the 1997–1998 season. After the season, he left for Karlsruher SC, he also played for LR Ahlen until 2003 and for Eintracht Braunschweig between 2003 and 2005.

=== International career ===
In 1998, Arnold was considered as a possible member of the South African squad for the 1998 FIFA World Cup, but didn't make the final team.

== Post-playing career ==
After retiring as a player in 2007, Arnold went into management. During the 2007–08 season, he worked as athletic director at Hessen Kassel, the club where he had ended his playing career at the end of the previous season. For the 2008–09 season, Arnold was named athletic director at then 3. Liga club Eintracht Braunschweig, which was in serious financial difficulties at the time. Under Arnold and manager Torsten Lieberknecht, the club managed to both greatly reduce its debts and improve on the field at the same time, while signing mostly talented players from the lower divisions on free transfers. During Arnold's tenure on the job, Braunschweig achieved promotion to the 2. Bundesliga in 2011, and to the Bundesliga in 2013.

== Honours ==
Borussia Dortmund

- Bundesliga: 1994–95
