= Phil Ofosu-Ayeh =

Footballer (born 1991)

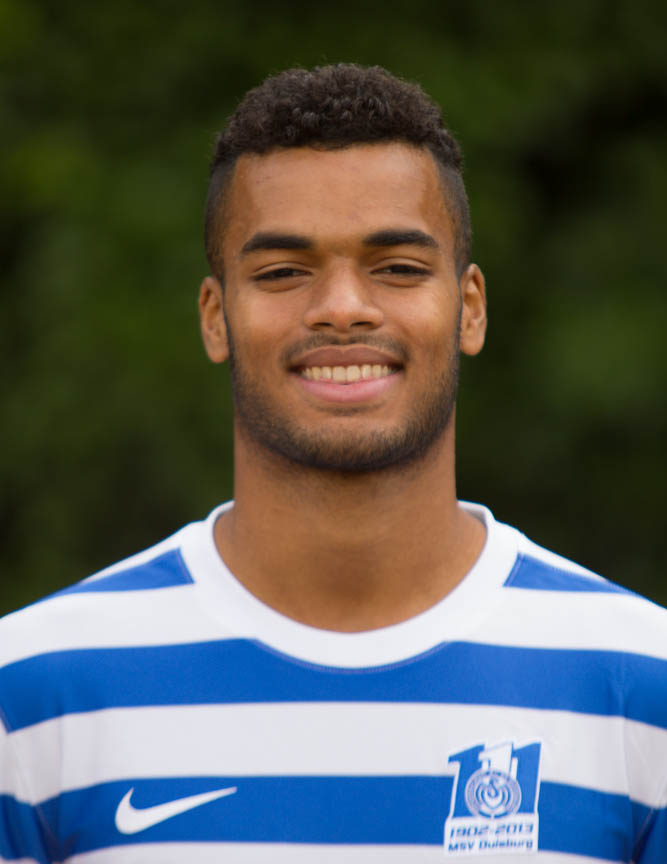
- Ofosu-Ayeh with MSV Duisburg in 2013

Personal information
- Full name: Phil Ofosu-Ayeh
- Date of birth: 15 September 1991 (age 35)
- Place of birth: Moers, Germany
- Height: 1.82 m (6 ft 0 in)
- Position: Right-back

Youth career
- 2002–2005: VfL Wilhelmshaven
- 2005–2007: SV Wilhelmshaven
- 2007–2009: VfB Oldenburg

Senior career*
| Years | Team | Apps | (Gls) |
| 2009–2011 | SV Wilhelmshaven | 30 | (2) |
| 2011–2013 | Rot-Weiß Erfurt | 59 | (1) |
| 2013–2014 | MSV Duisburg | 33 | (1) |
| 2014–2015 | VfR Aalen | 32 | (1) |
| 2015–2017 | Eintracht Braunschweig | 37 | (1) |
| 2017–2020 | Wolverhampton Wanderers | 0 | (0) |
| 2018–2019 | → Hansa Rostock (loan) | 5 | (0) |
| 2019 | → Würzburger Kickers (loan) | 4 | (0) |
| 2021–2024 | Halmstad | 65 | (5) |
| 2024–2025 | PSS Sleman | 16 | (1) |

International career
| 2015 | Ghana | 1 | (0) |
- * Club domestic league appearances and goals as of 2 February 2025

Phil Ofosu-Ayeh (born 15 September 1991) is a professional footballer who plays as a right-back. Born in Germany, Ofosu-Ayeh has made one appearance for the Ghana national team.

== Club career ==
On 29 April 2014, Ofosu-Ayeh signed a two-year contract to join VfR Aalen the following season. After Aalen's relegation, he transferred to Eintracht Braunschweig for the 2015–16 2. Bundesliga season. Ofosu-Ayeh's contract with Braunschweig was not renewed after the 2016–17 2. Bundesliga season.

On 20 June 2017, he signed a three-year deal with Sky Bet Championship side Wolverhampton Wanderers.

On 31 August 2018, Ofosu-Ayeh joined Hansa Rostock on loan until the end of 2018–19 season. On 31 January 2019, the last day of the 2018–19 winter transfer window, the dissolution of his loan contract was agreed. In his half-season at the club he made five appearances.

On 31 January 2019, Ofosu-Ayeh joined Würzburger Kickers on loan for the rest of the 2018–19 season.

He was released by Wolves on 1 July 2020 without playing a single game for them. After his departure, Ofosu-Ayeh recovered from his injuries and trained with various Swiss club such as Bülach, Red Star Zürich and Young Fellows Juventus.

After recovering from his injuries he went on trial with Swedish club Halmstads BK and was eventually able to secure a contract with the club, making his debut against Västerås SK in the Svenska Cupen. However things was cut short as shortly into the premiere match of Allsvenskan 2021, he got injured and was forced to get substituted, it was later confirmed that he had injured his cruciate ligament and was expected miss most of the season.

In July 2024, Ofosu-Ayeh joined Indonesian Liga 1 club PSS Sleman.

== International career ==
Ofosu-Ayeh, born in Moers to a German mother and a Ghanaian father, was given a call-up to the preliminary Ghana U-20 squad for the 2011 African Youth Championship, but his club at the time, SV Wilhelmshaven, refused to give him permission to play at the tournament.

On 13 October 2015, Ofosu-Ayeh made his full international debut for Ghana, in a friendly against Canada played in Washington, D.C.

== Career statistics ==
As of match played 2 February 2025

Appearances and goals by club, season and competition
| Club | Season | League | | | National cup | | League cup | | Other | | Total | |
| Club | Season | Division | Apps | Goals | Apps | Goals | Apps | Goals | Apps | Goals | Apps | Goals |
|---|---|---|---|---|---|---|---|---|---|---|---|---|
| SV Wilhelmshaven | 2009–10 | Regionalliga Nord | 4 | 1 | 0 | 0 | – | | 0 | 0 | 4 | 1 |
| SV Wilhelmshaven | 2010–11 | Regionalliga Nord | 26 | 1 | 0 | 0 | – | | 0 | 0 | 26 | 1 |
| SV Wilhelmshaven | Total | | 30 | 2 | 0 | 0 | 0 | 0 | 0 | 0 | 30 | 2 |
| Rot-Weiß Erfurt | 2011–12 | 3. Liga | 27 | 0 | 0 | 0 | – | | 0 | 0 | 27 | 0 |
| Rot-Weiß Erfurt | 2012–13 | 3. Liga | 32 | 1 | 0 | 0 | – | | 0 | 0 | 32 | 1 |
| Rot-Weiß Erfurt | Total | | 59 | 1 | 0 | 0 | 0 | 0 | 0 | 0 | 59 | 1 |
| MSV Duisburg | 2013–14 | 3. Liga | 33 | 1 | 1 | 0 | – | | 0 | 0 | 34 | 1 |
| VfR Aalen | 2014–15 | 2. Bundesliga | 32 | 1 | 3 | 0 | – | | 0 | 0 | 35 | 1 |
| Eintracht Braunschweig | 2015–16 | 2. Bundesliga | 20 | 0 | 3 | 0 | – | | 0 | 0 | 23 | 0 |
| Eintracht Braunschweig | 2016–17 | 2. Bundesliga | 16 | 1 | 1 | 0 | – | | 0 | 0 | 17 | 1 |
| Eintracht Braunschweig | Total | | 36 | 1 | 4 | 0 | 0 | 0 | 0 | 0 | 40 | 1 |
| Wolverhampton | 2017–18 | Championship | 0 | 0 | 0 | 0 | 0 | 0 | 0 | 0 | 0 | 0 |
| Hansa Rostock | 2018–19 | 3. Liga | 5 | 0 | 0 | 0 | – | | 0 | 0 | 5 | 0 |
| Halmstads BK | 2021 | Allsvenskan | 1 | 0 | 2 | 0 | – | | 0 | 0 | 3 | 0 |
| Halmstads BK | 2022 | Superettan | 25 | 2 | 0 | 0 | – | | 0 | 0 | 25 | 2 |
| Halmstads BK | 2023 | Allsvenskan | 27 | 1 | 0 | 0 | – | | 0 | 0 | 27 | 1 |
| Halmstads BK | 2024 | Allsvenskan | 12 | 2 | 0 | 0 | – | | 0 | 0 | 12 | 2 |
| Halmstads BK | Total | | 65 | 5 | 2 | 0 | 0 | 0 | 0 | 0 | 67 | 5 |
| PSS Sleman | 2024–25 | Liga 1 | 16 | 1 | 0 | 0 | – | | 0 | 0 | 16 | 1 |
| Career total | | | 251 | 10 | 10 | 0 | 0 | 0 | 0 | 0 | 261 | 10 |
