= Dennis Slamar =

German footballer

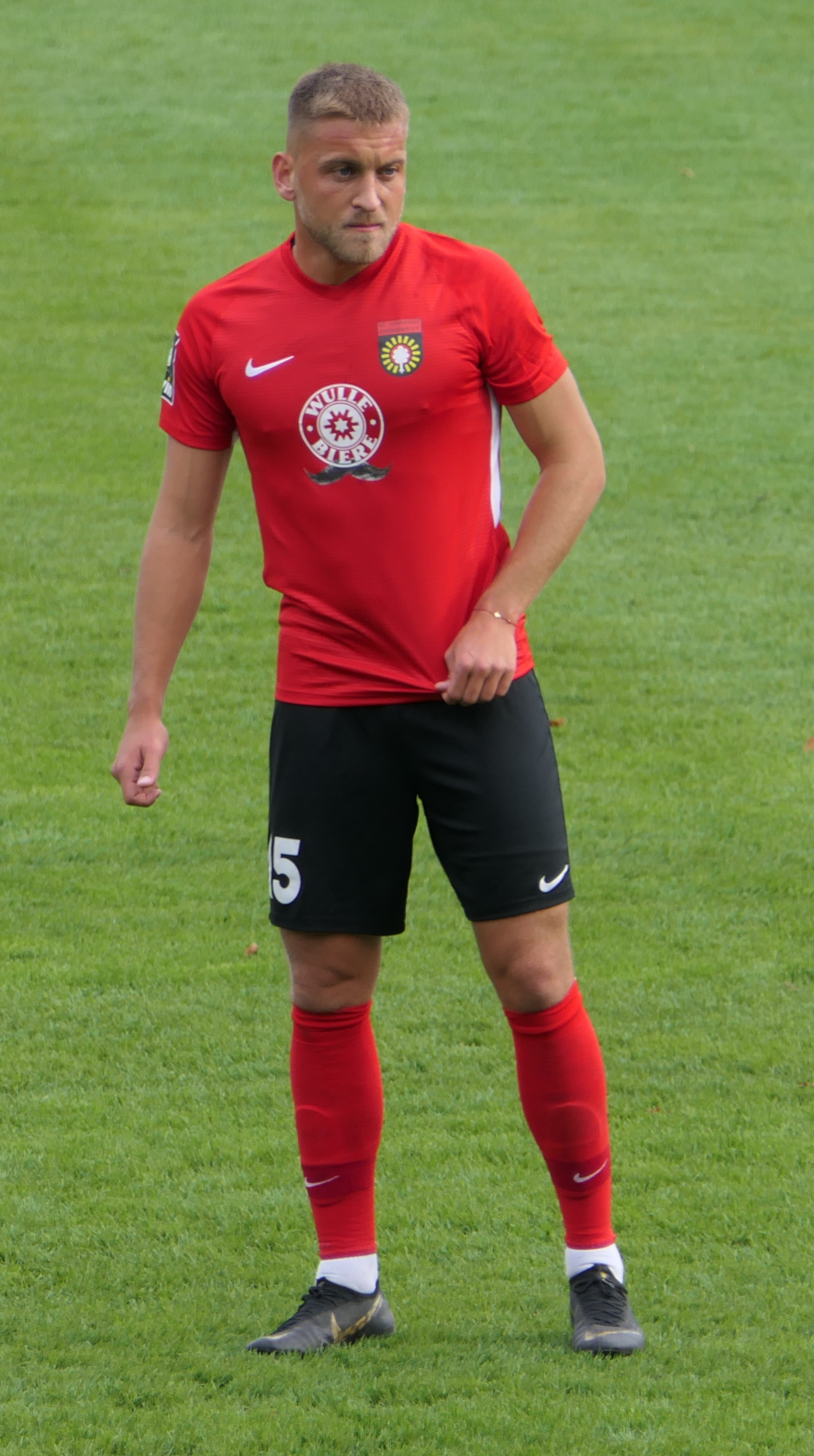

Personal information
- Date of birth: 8 September 1994 (age 32)
- Place of birth: Berlin, Germany
- Height: 1.87 m (6 ft 2 in)
- Position: Centre back

Team information
- Current team: Chemnitzer FC
- Number: 21

Youth career
- 1. FC Lübars
- Füchse Berlin Reinickendorf
- –2011: SV Tasmania-Gropiusstadt 73
- 2011: Hallescher FC
- 2012–2013: Eintracht Braunschweig

Senior career*
Years	Team	Apps	(Gls)
2013–2016	Eintracht Braunschweig II	84	(1)
2015–2016	Eintracht Braunschweig	0	(0)
2016–2019	Carl Zeiss Jena	88	(2)
2016	Carl Zeiss Jena II	3	(0)
2019–2020	Sonnenhof Großaspach	20	(0)
2020–2022	Carl Zeiss Jena	32	(2)
2022–2026	Energie Cottbus	96	(2)
2026–	Chemnitzer FC	10	(0)
- * Club domestic league appearances and goals as of 23 September 2026

Dennis Slamar (born 8 September 1994) is a German footballer who plays as a defender for Chemnitzer FC.

== Career ==
Slamar joined the youth academy of Eintracht Braunschweig in 2012 from Hallescher FC. In 2015, he was promoted to the club's senior side in the 2. Bundesliga. However, he made no appearance for the team during the 2015–16 season. In September 2016, Slamar joined Carl Zeiss Jena.

On 24 June 2019 SG Sonnenhof Großaspach confirmed, that they had signed Slamar on a 2-year contract.
