= Salim Khelifi =

Footballer (born 1994)

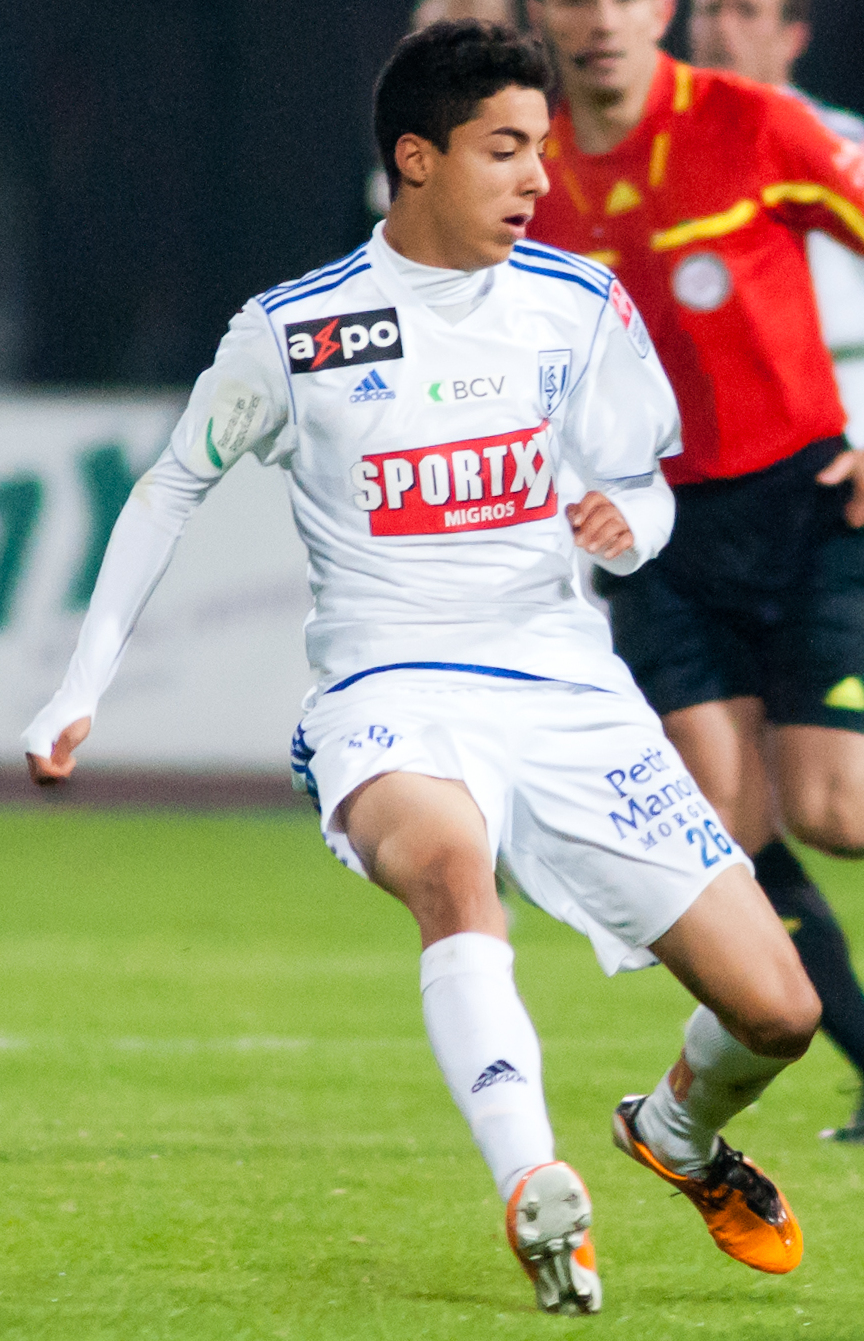
- Khelifi in 2011

Personal information
- Date of birth: 26 January 1994 (age 32)
- Place of birth: Lausanne, Switzerland
- Height: 1.73 m (5 ft 8 in)
- Position: Winger

Team information
- Current team: Puerto Cabello

Youth career
- 2002–2007: Bex
- 2007–2009: Vevey-Sports
- 2009: Bex
- 2009–2011: Lausanne-Sport

Senior career*
Years	Team	Apps	(Gls)
2011–2013	Lausanne-Sport	76	(6)
2014–2015	Eintracht Braunschweig II	6	(1)
2014–2018	Eintracht Braunschweig	86	(11)
2018–2022	Zürich	41	(5)
2020–2022	Zürich II	9	(6)
2019–2020	→ Holstein Kiel (loan)	9	(0)
2022–2024	Perth Glory	24	(3)
2024	→ Melbourne Victory (loan)	16	(0)
2025-	Puerto Cabello	8	(1)

International career^{‡}
2010–2011	Switzerland U17	14	(2)
2011–2013	Switzerland U19	18	(2)
2013–2016	Switzerland U21	11	(1)
2019	Tunisia	2	(0)
- * Club domestic league appearances and goals as of 30 May 2025 ‡ National team caps and goals as of 12 September 2020

Salim Khelifi (born 26 January 1994) is a professional footballer who plays as a winger for Puerto Cabello. Born in Switzerland, he was a youth international for Switzerland before representing the Tunisia national team.

== Club career ==
=== Lausanne-Sport ===
Khelifi made his professional debut on 6 August 2012 for Lausanne-Sport against Servette in a Swiss Super League match. He scored his first league goal for the club on 17 November 2012 in a 3–0 home win against Thun.

=== Eintracht Braunschweig ===
In January 2014 Khelifi joined Eintracht Braunschweig, who played in the Bundesliga at the time. He made his debut in the Bundesliga on 3 May 2014, replacing Karim Bellarabi in the 88th minute of Braunschweig's home game against FC Augsburg.

=== FC Zürich ===
On 21 June 2018, Khelifi signed a three-year contract with Swiss side FC Zürich.

On 23 August 2019, Khelifi joined Holstein Kiel on a season-long loan deal with an option to make the deal permanent.

On 21 May 2022, Zürich announced that Khelifi's contract will not be extended.

=== Perth Glory ===
In September 2022, Khelifi joined Australian A-League Men club Perth Glory on a one-year contract. In December 2022, his contract was extended for another two seasons.

In January 2024, Khelifi was loaned to Melbourne Victory for the remainder of the 2023-24 A-League. Perth Glory confirmed that it was not their decision to accept the loan offer, but they were instructed to do so by the Australian Professional Leagues (APL). Perth Glory was in administration at the time as attempts were made to find a buyer for the club, and they were also blocked from signing any new players or extending any loans.

== International career ==
Khelifi debuted for the Tunisia national team in a 1–0 friendly win over Mauritania on 6 September 2019.
