= Ken Reichel =

German footballer

Personal information
- Full name: Ken Reichel
- Date of birth: 19 December 1986 (age 39)
- Place of birth: West Berlin, Germany
- Height: 1.84 m (6 ft 0 in)
- Position: Defender

Youth career
- TSV Rudow
- Tasmania-Gropiusstadt

Senior career*
| Years | Team | Apps | (Gls) |
| –2004 | Tasmania-Gropiusstadt | | |
| 2005–2007 | Hamburger SV II | 35 | (3) |
| 2007–2018 | Eintracht Braunschweig | 297 | (22) |
| 2018–2020 | Union Berlin | 34 | (0) |
| 2020–2021 | VfL Osnabrück | 20 | (0) |
- * Club domestic league appearances and goals as of 12 August 2021

Ken Reichel (born 19 December 1986) is a German former professional footballer who played as a defender.

== Career ==
Reichel started out with TSV Rudow and SV Tasmania-Gropiusstadt 1973 in his hometown of Berlin, before moving to the reserve side of Hamburger SV in January 2005.

After two years in Hamburg, where he did not make it into HSV's first team, he joined Eintracht Braunschweig in 2007 and over the years became one of the key players there. With Braunschweig, Reichel played in the Regionalliga Nord, the 3. Liga, the 2. Bundesliga and the Bundesliga. In July 2017, he was named captain of the team. In June 2018, following Braunschweig's relegation to the 3. Liga, it was announced that Reichel had rejected the club's contract offer and that he would leave after more than decade at the club.

Shortly after leaving Braunschweig, Reichel joined 1. FC Union Berlin signing a two-year contract.

== Career statistics ==
As of 6 June 2018

Appearances and goals by club, season and competition
| Club | Season | League | | | Cup (Note: Includes DFB-Pokal) | | Other (Note: Includes Bundesliga relegation playoffs) | | Total | |
| Club | Season | Division | Apps | Goals | Apps | Goals | Apps | Goals | Apps | Goals |
|---|---|---|---|---|---|---|---|---|---|---|
| Hamburger SV II | 2004–05 | Regionalliga Nord | 3 | 1 | — | | — | | 3 | 1 |
| Hamburger SV II | 2005–06 | Regionalliga Nord | 9 | 0 | — | | — | | 9 | 0 |
| Hamburger SV II | 2006–07 | Regionalliga Nord | 23 | 2 | — | | — | | 23 | 2 |
| Hamburger SV II | Total | | 35 | 3 | 0 | 0 | 0 | 0 | 35 | 3 |
| Eintracht Braunschweig | 2007–08 | Regionalliga Nord | 7 | 0 | 1 | 0 | — | | 8 | 0 |
| Eintracht Braunschweig | 2008–09 | 3. Liga | 19 | 0 | — | | — | | 19 | 0 |
| Eintracht Braunschweig | 2009–10 | 3. Liga | 26 | 0 | — | | — | | 26 | 0 |
| Eintracht Braunschweig | 2010–11 | 3. Liga | 35 | 1 | 1 | 0 | — | | 36 | 1 |
| Eintracht Braunschweig | 2011–12 | 2. Bundesliga | 33 | 0 | 1 | 0 | — | | 34 | 0 |
| Eintracht Braunschweig | 2012–13 | 2. Bundesliga | 25 | 0 | 2 | 0 | — | | 27 | 0 |
| Eintracht Braunschweig | 2013–14 | Bundesliga | 27 | 1 | 1 | 0 | — | | 28 | 1 |
| Eintracht Braunschweig | 2014–15 | 2. Bundesliga | 32 | 4 | 3 | 0 | — | | 35 | 4 |
| Eintracht Braunschweig | 2015–16 | 2. Bundesliga | 31 | 7 | 3 | 0 | — | | 34 | 7 |
| Eintracht Braunschweig | 2016–17 | 2. Bundesliga | 32 | 7 | 1 | 0 | 2 | 0 | 35 | 7 |
| Eintracht Braunschweig | 2017–18 | 2. Bundesliga | 30 | 2 | 1 | 0 | 0 | 0 | 31 | 2 |
| Eintracht Braunschweig | Total | | 297 | 22 | 14 | 0 | 2 | 0 | 313 | 22 |
| Career total | | | 332 | 25 | 14 | 0 | 2 | 0 | 348 | 25 |
