= Mads Dittmer Hvilsom =

Danish footballer (born 1992)

Mads Hvilsom
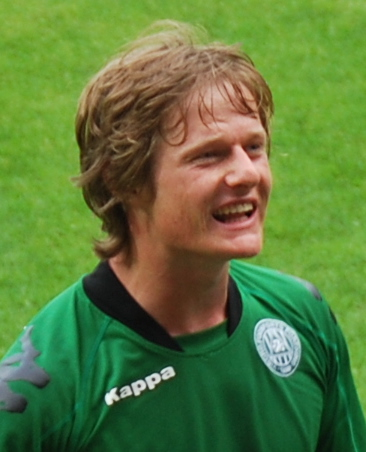
- Hvilsom in August 2011

Personal information
- Full name: Mads Dittmer Hvilsom
- Date of birth: 23 August 1992 (age 34)
- Place of birth: Himmelev, Denmark
- Height: 1.89 m (6 ft 2 in)
- Positions: Winger; forward

Youth career
- Himmelev-Veddelev
- Hvidovre
- Roskilde
- Midtjylland

Senior career*
| Years | Team | Apps | (Gls) |
| 2008–2014 | Midtjylland | 17 | (3) |
| 2011 | → Viborg (loan) | 14 | (5) |
| 2012–2014 | → Hobro (loan) | 37 | (11) |
| 2014–2015 | Hobro | 33 | (16) |
| 2015–2017 | Eintracht Braunschweig | 5 | (0) |
| 2016 | → Brann (loan) | 10 | (0) |
| 2016–2017 | → Esbjerg (loan) | 24 | (2) |
| 2017–2019 | Esbjerg | 0 | (0) |
| 2017–2019 | → SønderjyskE (loan) | 36 | (6) |
| 2019–2023 | Hobro | 42 | (13) |

International career
| | Denmark U16 | 4 | (4) |
| | Denmark U17 | 17 | (8) |
| | Denmark U18 | 9 | (4) |
- * Club domestic league appearances and goals

Mads Dittmer Hvilsom (born 23 August 1992) is a Danish retired professional footballer who played as a forward.

== Career ==
On 5 April 2009, Hvilsom made his debut for FC Midtjylland's first team in the Danish Superliga, becoming the youngest player to debut ever at just 16 years and 225 days.

He went through the youth academies of Hvidovre IF and FC Roskilde.

=== Viborg FF ===
In the summer of 2011, Hvilsom was loaned out to Viborg FF on a one-year loan deal, with the option to buy. Hvilsom debuted for Viborg FF on 8 August 2011 in a cup match against Skive IK. Four days later, Viborg FF met FC Hjørring in a league game, where Hvilsom scored his first goal for the club, followed by his second and third goals, which completed a hattrick. After the season, Midtjylland announced that Hvilsom would return from Viborg.

=== Hobro IK ===
In the summer of 2012 was Hvilsom loaned out to first division club Hobro IK. He was the club's top scorer in his first season with 11 goals. The performance was good that the clubs exchanged the loan for a permanent contract with Hobro IK, who was also moved up in the Super League. He scored 16 goals in the 2014–15 season and became the second top goalscorers in the league.

=== Eintracht Braunschweig ===
In the summer of 2015, Mads Hvilsom moved to the German 2. Bundesliga club Eintracht Braunschweig on a three-year agreement. The first reports goes on Eintracht Braunschweig had to pay up €520,000.

Mads Hvilsoms first comments on the move were:

"Of course it is a great opportunity for me. I have had some really good years in Hobro, and now it looks set to continue in Eintracht Braunschweig. I have for many years dreamed to try me at the highest level, and I am happy and proud that it finally succeeds, says Mads Hvilsom to Hobro IK website."

==== Loan to SK Brann ====
In January 2016, Hvilsom joined Norwegian club SK Brann on an eighteen-months loan deal.

=== Esbjerg fB ===
In June 2016, Hvilsom's loan deal with SK Brann was terminated and replaced by a loan-to-buy agreement with Danish club Esbjerg fB, reuniting him with former Hobro IK head coach Jonas Dal. The deal with Esbjerg, which will initially bring in Hvilsom on a 12-month loan, will keep him with the Danish side until the summer of 2019.

Esbjerg was relegated to the Danish 1st Division for the 2017/18 season. Hvilsom revealed in the beginning of June 2017, that Esbjerg had asked him to find a new club.

==== Loan to SønderjyskE ====
On 9 June 2017 it was confirmed, that SønderjyskE had signed Hvilsom on a season-long loan deal.

In April 2021, for the second time in his career, Hvilsom tore his cruciate knee ligament and once again had to undergo extensive surgery. A year later, he was back on the pitch, making three appearances in July and August 2022. But after that, he was back on the wagon, and due to suffering problems, he had to undergo another operation in October 2022. Hvilsom never fully recovered from the serious knee injuries and on 5 February 2023, the 30-year-old striker confirmed that he was forced to retire.

=== Back to Hobro IK ===
Hobro IK announced on 28 March 2019, that they had signed Hvilsom from the summer 2019, where his contract with both SønderjyskE and Esbjerg fB would expire.
