= Niko Kijewski =

German footballer

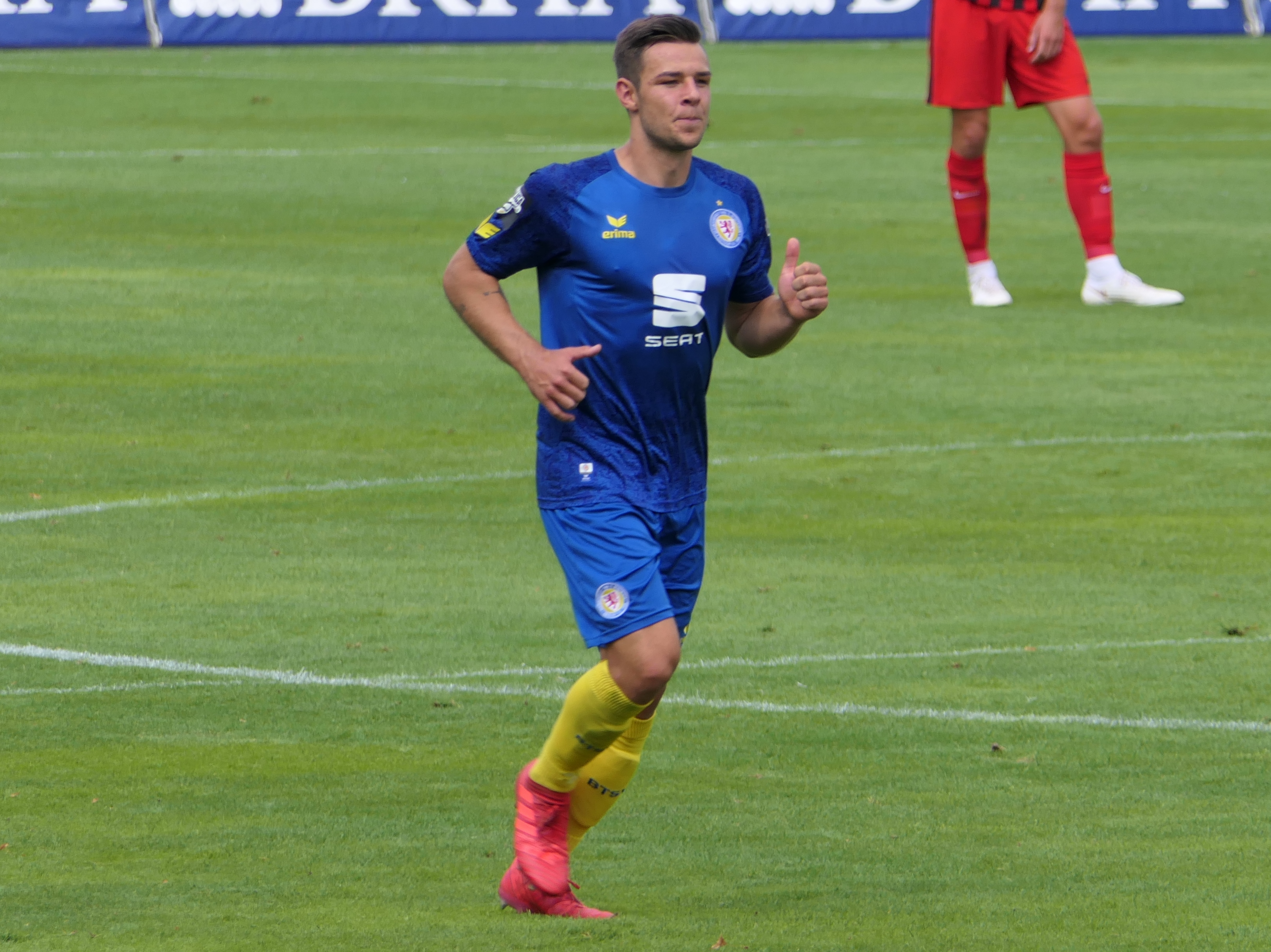
- Kijewski with Eintracht Braunschweig in 2018

Personal information
- Date of birth: 28 March 1996 (age 30)
- Place of birth: Osnabrück, Germany
- Height: 1.78 m (5 ft 10 in)
- Position: Left-back

Team information
- Current team: SC Verl
- Number: 19

Youth career
- –2011: VfL Büren
- 2011–2014: VfL Osnabrück
- 2014–2015: Eintracht Braunschweig

Senior career*
Years	Team	Apps	(Gls)
2015–2017	Eintracht Braunschweig II	41	(2)
2015–2024	Eintracht Braunschweig	149	(2)
2024–	SC Verl	64	(4)

International career^{‡}
2011	Germany U16	1	(0)
2013–2014	Germany U18	8	(0)
2014–2015	Germany U19	9	(0)
- * Club domestic league appearances and goals as of 28 May 2026 ‡ National team caps and goals as of 16:31, 17 July 2020 (UTC)

Niko Kijewski (born 28 March 1996) is a German professional footballer who plays as a left-back for 3. Liga club SC Verl.

== Club career ==
Kijewski joined the youth setup of Eintracht Braunschweig in 2014 from VfL Osnabrück. He was promoted to the club's senior side for the 2015–16 season.

In 2016, he made his professional debut for Eintracht in the 2. Bundesliga, in a match against SC Paderborn 07.

On 29 July 2024, Kijewski signed with SC Verl in 3. Liga.

== International career ==
Kijewski has represented Germany at the youth level. He was part of the German squad at the 2015 UEFA European Under-19 Championship in Greece.
