= Nik Omladič =

Slovenian footballer (born 1989)

- Omladič with Olimpija Ljubljana

Personal information
- Date of birth: 21 August 1989 (age 37)
- Place of birth: Celje, SFR Yugoslavia
- Height: 1.80 m (5 ft 11 in)
- Position: Midfielder

Team information
- Current team: GSV St. Martin/Sulmtal

Youth career
- –2005: Šmartno ob Paki
- 2005–2007: Rudar Velenje

Senior career*
Years	Team	Apps	(Gls)
2006–2010	Rudar Velenje	83	(7)
2008–2009	→ Šmartno 1928 (loan)	6	(4)
2010–2015	Olimpija Ljubljana	124	(25)
2015–2017	Eintracht Braunschweig	65	(4)
2017–2019	Greuther Fürth	15	(1)
2018	Greuther Fürth II	3	(1)
2019–2022	Hansa Rostock	54	(8)
2022	Rudar Velenje	11	(5)
2023	Hallescher FC	15	(0)
2023–2026	Koper	69	(6)
2026–	GSV St. Martin/Sulmtal	0	(0)

International career
2007	Slovenia U18	2	(0)
2007	Slovenia U19	7	(1)
2008–2009	Slovenia U20	4	(0)
2008–2009	Slovenia U21	6	(0)
2015–2017	Slovenia	6	(0)
- * Club domestic league appearances and goals as of 7 July 2026

Nik Omladič (born 21 August 1989) is a Slovenian footballer who plays as a midfielder for Austrian club GSV St. Martin/Sulmtal.

== Club career ==
Omladič started his career at his hometown club Šmartno ob Paki. As a youngster, he moved to nearby Rudar Velenje. He made his Rudar debut on 29 October 2006 in the 2. SNL tie with Dravinja. Omladič began to establish himself in the Rudar first team during the 2006–07 season, making 15 appearances and scoring one goal. In the next season he was regular in the midfield, making 24 appearances and scoring three goals. Rudar was first in the 2. SNL and won promotion to the PrvaLiga. In his first season in Slovenian top division Omladič made 31 appearances and scored one goal.

On 29 January 2010, it was announced that he signed a contract with Olimpija Ljubljana.

On 9 January 2015, Omladič joined German club Eintracht Braunschweig, signing a two-and-a-half-year contract. At the end of the 2016–17 season, he chose not to extend his contract. On 6 June 2017, he signed for Greuther Fürth.

On 27 January 2023, Omladič signed a contract with 3. Liga club Hallescher FC until the end of the 2022–23 season.

== International career ==
Omladič made his debut for the Slovenia under-21 team on 19 August 2008, coming in as a late substitute in a friendly match against England U21.

On 30 March 2015, he made his debut for the senior team in a friendly against Qatar.
