= Torsten Lieberknecht =

German football manager

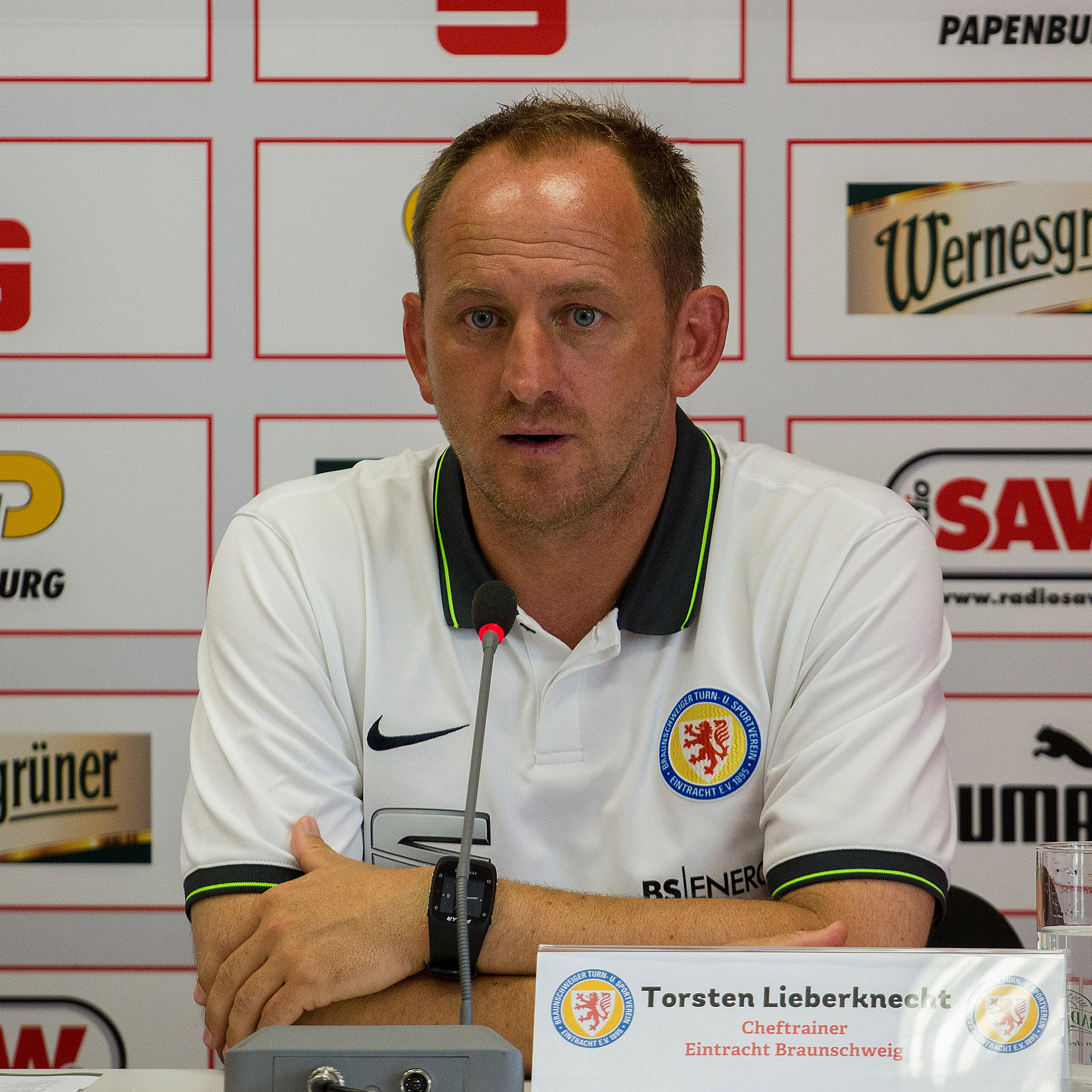
- Lieberknecht with Eintracht Braunschweig in 2015

Personal information
- Date of birth: 1 August 1973 (age 53)
- Place of birth: Bad Dürkheim, West Germany
- Height: 1.74 m (5 ft 9 in)
- Position: Midfielder

Team information
- Current team: 1. FC Kaiserslautern (head coach)

Youth career
- FV Haßloch
- 1. FC 08 Haßloch
- –1990: VfL Neustadt/Weinstraße
- 1990–1992: 1. FC Kaiserslautern

Senior career*
| Years | Team | Apps | (Gls) |
| 1992–1994 | 1. FC Kaiserslautern | 13 | (1) |
| 1994–1995 | Waldhof Mannheim | 22 | (0) |
| 1995–2002 | Mainz 05 | 89 | (3) |
| 2002–2003 | 1. FC Saarbrücken | 7 | (0) |
| 2003–2007 | Eintracht Braunschweig | 82 | (2) |
| Total | | 213 | (6) |

International career
| | Germany U-19 | 3 | (0) |
| 1994–1995 | Germany U-21 | 9 | (0) |

Managerial career
- 2008–2018: Eintracht Braunschweig
- 2018–2020: MSV Duisburg
- 2021–2024: Darmstadt 98
- 2025–: 1. FC Kaiserslautern
- * Club domestic league appearances and goals

Torsten Lieberknecht (born 1 August 1973) is a German football manager and former player who is the head coach 2. Bundesliga club of 1. FC Kaiserslautern.

== Playing career ==
Lieberknecht began his senior career at 1. FC Kaiserslautern, where he made his Bundesliga debut on 26 August 1992 in a game against SG Wattenscheid 09. He left Kaiserslautern after the 1993–1994 season to join SV Waldhof Mannheim and went on to play a total of ten seasons in the 2. Bundesliga for Mannheim, 1. FSV Mainz 05 and Eintracht Braunschweig before retiring as a player in 2007.

Lieberknecht also represented Germany nine times at the U-21 level and was part of the German squad for the 1993 FIFA World Youth Championship in Australia.

== Managerial career ==
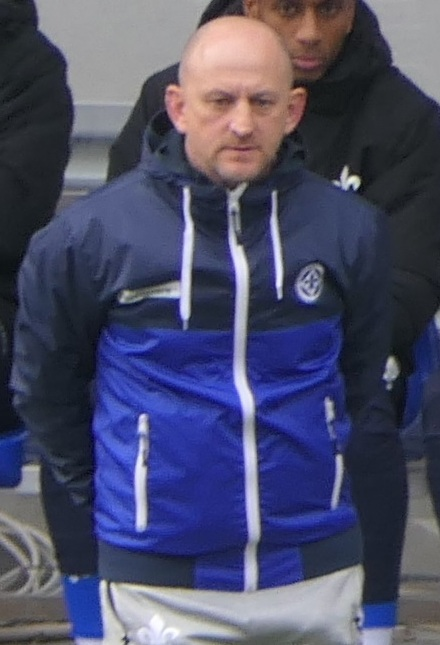
Lieberknecht with Darmstadt 98 in 2023

After retiring as a player, Lieberknecht became a youth coach at his last club, Eintracht Braunschweig. At the end of the 2007–08 Regionalliga season the club was in serious danger of missing out on qualification for Germany's new nationwide third-tier league 3. Liga, which would have meant Braunschweig's first ever relegation to the fourth level of Germany's football league system. When Benno Möhlmann, at the time the manager of Eintracht Braunschweig's first team, stepped down in May 2008, Lieberknecht was named his successor. Under him the club not only secured 3. Liga qualification on the last match day of the season, but since then has started a steady climb back up the ladder of German football. In 2010–11 Lieberknecht and his team were promoted back into the 2. Bundesliga, and quickly established themselves at this level. After having finished the previous season comfortably midtable, the club was even more successful during the 2012–13 season and in the end won promotion to the Bundesliga. This marked Eintracht Braunschweig's return into Germany's top-flight after a 28-year absence. Lieberknecht was widely recognized in the media both in Germany and abroad as one of the key figures in the club's resurgence after years in the second and third tier. After ten years, his spell at Braunschweig ended in 2018. He finished with a record of 151 wins, 99 draws, and 120 losses.

In October 2018, he was appointed by MSV Duisburg as the new head coach. He was sacked on 10 November 2020. He moved to Darmstadt 98 in June 2021. He led the club to promotion to the 2023–24 Bundesliga, but they were relegated after one season in the top flight. In September 2024, he resigned.

In April 2025, he was appointed as head coach of 1. FC Kaiserslautern.

== Managerial statistics ==
As of 22 November 2026

| Team | From | To | Record | | | | | |
| Team | From | To | G | W | D | L | Win % | Ref. |
|---|---|---|---|---|---|---|---|---|
| Eintracht Braunschweig | 12 May 2008 | 14 May 2018 | 371 | 151 | 99 | 121 | 40.70 | |
| MSV Duisburg | 1 October 2018 | 10 November 2020 | 77 | 27 | 21 | 29 | 35.06 | |
| Darmstadt 98 | 1 July 2021 | 1 September 2024 | 112 | 44 | 22 | 46 | 39.29 | |
| 1. FC Kaiserslautern | 22 April 2025 | Present | 55 | 28 | 9 | 18 | 50.91 | |
| Total | | | 613 | 250 | 149 | 214 | 40.78 | — |
