= List of German football transfers summer 2012 =

This is a list of German football transfers in the summer transfer window 2012 by club. Only transfers of the Bundesliga, and 2. Bundesliga are included.

== Bundesliga ==
=== Borussia Dortmund ===
In:

Out:

Note: Flags indicate national team as has been defined under FIFA eligibility rules. Players may hold more than one non-FIFA nationality.

| No. | Pos. | Nation | Player |
|---|---|---|---|
| 11 | FW | GER | Marco Reus (from Borussia Mönchengladbach) |
| 21 | MF | GER | Oliver Kirch (from 1. FC Kaiserslautern) |
| 23 | FW | GER | Julian Schieber (from VfB Stuttgart) |
| 28 | FW | AUS | Mustafa Amini (loan return from Central Coast Mariners) |
| 32 | MF | GER | Leonardo Bittencourt (from Energie Cottbus) |

| No. | Pos. | Nation | Player |
|---|---|---|---|
| 2 | DF | GER | Julian Koch (on loan to MSV Duisburg) |
| 6 | MF | GER | Florian Kringe (to FC St. Pauli) |
| 8 | MF | BRA | Antônio da Silva (to MSV Duisburg) |
| 18 | FW | PAR | Lucas Barrios (to Guangzhou Evergrande F.C.) |
| 23 | MF | JPN | Shinji Kagawa (to Manchester United) |
| 37 | FW | USA | Terrence Boyd (to Rapid Wien) |
| 41 | GK | GER | Johannes Focher (to Sturm Graz) |
| -- | FW | GER | Marco Stiepermann (to Energie Cottbus, previously on loan at Alemannia Aachen) |
| -- | DF | GER | Lasse Sobiech (on loan to SpVgg Greuther Fürth, previously on loan at FC St. Pauli) |
| -- | FW | GER | Daniel Ginczek (on loan to FC St. Pauli, previously on loan at VfL Bochum) |
| -- | FW | BUL | Dimitar Rangelov (to FC Luzern, previously on loan at Energie Cottbus) |

=== FC Bayern Munich ===
In:

| No. | Pos. | Nation | Player |
|---|---|---|---|
| 4 | DF | BRA | Dante (from Borussia Mönchengladbach) |
| 8 | MF | ESP | Javi Martinez (from Athletic Bilbao) |
| 9 | FW | CRO | Mario Mandžukić (from VfL Wolfsburg) |
| 11 | MF | SUI | Xherdan Shaqiri (from FC Basel) |
| 14 | FW | PER | Claudio Pizarro (from Werder Bremen) |
| 20 | FW | GER | Patrick Weihrauch (from Bayern Munich Junior Team) |
| 22 | GK | GER | Tom Starke (from 1899 Hoffenheim) |
| 23 | MF | GER | Mitchell Weiser (from 1. FC Köln) |
| 32 | GK | GER | Lukas Raeder (from Schalke 04 Youth) |
| 36 | MF | GER | Emre Can (from Bayern Munich II) |

Out:

| No. | Pos. | Nation | Player |
|---|---|---|---|
| 2 | DF | BRA | Breno (released) |
| 9 | FW | GER | Nils Petersen (on loan to Werder Bremen) |
| 11 | FW | CRO | Ivica Olić (to VfL Wolfsburg) |
| 14 | FW | JPN | Takashi Usami (loan return to Gamba Osaka) |
| 22 | GK | GER | Hans-Jörg Butt (retired) |
| 23 | MF | CRO | Danijel Pranjić (to Sporting CP) |
| 32 | GK | GER | Rouven Sattelmaier (released) |

=== FC Schalke 04 ===
In:

| No. | Pos. | Nation | Player |
|---|---|---|---|
| 11 | MF | NED | Ibrahim Afellay (on loan from FC Barcelona) |
| 19 | FW | NGR | Chinedu Obasi (from 1899 Hoffenheim, previously on loan) |
| 27 | MF | SUI | Tranquillo Barnetta (from Bayer 04 Leverkusen) |
| 33 | MF | GER | Roman Neustädter (from Borussia Mönchengladbach) |

Out:

| No. | Pos. | Nation | Player |
|---|---|---|---|
| 2 | DF | GHA | Hans Sarpei (released) |
| 6 | DF | GER | Tim Hoogland (on loan to VfB Stuttgart) |
| 7 | FW | ESP | Raúl (to Al-Sadd SC) |
| 11 | MF | GER | Alexander Baumjohann (to 1. FC Kaiserslautern) |
| 18 | MF | ESP | José Manuel Jurado (on loan to FC Spartak Moscow) |
| 24 | MF | GER | Peer Kluge (to Hertha BSC) |
| 30 | MF | GEO | Levan Kenia (to FC Karpaty Lviv) |
| 33 | GK | GER | Mathias Schober (retired) |
| -- | MF | PER | Carlos Zambrano (to Eintracht Frankfurt, previously on loan at FC St. Pauli) |
| -- | MF | CZE | Jan Morávek (to FC Augsburg previously on loan) |
| -- | FW | SUI | Mario Gavranović (to FC Zürich, previously on loan at 1. FSV Mainz 05) |
| -- | MF | ROU | Ciprian Deac (to CFR Cluj, previously on loan at Rapid București) |
| -- | MF | GHA | Anthony Annan (on loan to CA Osasuna, previously on loan at Vitesse Arnhem) |

=== Borussia Mönchengladbach ===
In:

| No. | Pos. | Nation | Player |
|---|---|---|---|
| 8 | MF | GER | Lukas Rupp (loan return from SC Paderborn 07) |
| 9 | FW | NED | Luuk de Jong (from FC Twente) |
| 15 | DF | ESP | Álvaro Domínguez (from Atlético Madrid) |
| 22 | FW | GER | Peniel Mlapa (from 1899 Hoffenheim) |
| 31 | FW | SWE | Branimir Hrgota (from Jönköpings Södra IF) |
| 34 | MF | SUI | Granit Xhaka (from FC Basel) |

Out:

| No. | Pos. | Nation | Player |
|---|---|---|---|
| 11 | FW | GER | Marco Reus (to Borussia Dortmund) |
| 13 | MF | GER | Roman Neustädter (to FC Schalke 04) |
| 20 | FW | AUS | Mathew Leckie (on loan to FSV Frankfurt) |
| 23 | MF | JPN | Yūki Ōtsu (to VVV-Venlo) |
| 28 | DF | BRA | Anderson Bamba (to Eintracht Frankfurt, previously on loan) |
| 31 | DF | BRA | Dante (to Bayern Munich) |
| -- | FW | GER | Elias Kachunga (on loan to Hertha BSC, previously on loan at VfL Osnabrück) |
| -- | GK | BEL | Logan Bailly (to OH Leuven, previously on loan at K.R.C. Genk) |
| -- | DF | GER | Tobias Levels (to Fortuna Düsseldorf, previously on loan) |

=== Bayer 04 Leverkusen ===
In:

| No. | Pos. | Nation | Player |
|---|---|---|---|
| 4 | DF | GER | Philipp Wollscheid (from 1. FC Nürnberg) |
| 7 | FW | CHI | Junior Fernándes (from Club Universidad de Chile) |
| 13 | MF | GER | Jens Hegeler (loan return from 1. FC Nürnberg) |
| 14 | MF | JPN | Hajime Hosogai (loan return from FC Augsburg) |
| 20 | DF | ESP | Dani Carvajal (from Real Madrid) |
| 23 | DF | BRA | Carlinhos (on loan from Desportivo Brasil) |
| 33 | GK | GER | Michael Rensing (from 1. FC Köln) |

Out:

| No. | Pos. | Nation | Player |
|---|---|---|---|
| 1 | GK | GER | René Adler (to Hamburger SV) |
| 4 | DF | GER | Bastian Oczipka (to Eintracht Frankfurt) |
| 7 | MF | SUI | Tranquillo Barnetta (to FC Schalke 04) |
| 13 | MF | GER | Michael Ballack (retired) |
| 14 | DF | CRO | Vedran Ćorluka (loan return to Tottenham Hotspur) |
| 19 | FW | SUI | Eren Derdiyok (to 1899 Hoffenheim) |
| 20 | DF | GER | Danny da Costa (on loan to FC Ingolstadt 04) |
| 36 | GK | GER | Fabian Giefer (to Fortuna Düsseldorf) |
| -- | MF | GRE | Athanasios Petsos (to SpVgg Greuther Fürth, previously on loan at 1. FC Kaiserslautern) |
| -- | FW | DEN | Nicolai Jørgensen (on loan to F.C. Copenhagen, previously on loan at 1. FC Kaiserslautern) |

=== VfB Stuttgart ===
In:

| No. | Pos. | Nation | Player |
|---|---|---|---|
| 10 | MF | GER | Daniel Didavi (loan return from 1. FC Nürnberg) |
| 17 | MF | TUR | Tunay Torun (from Hertha BSC) |
| 23 | DF | GER | Tim Hoogland (on loan from FC Schalke 04) |
| -- | FW | USA | Jerome Kiesewetter (from Hertha BSC II) |

Out:

| No. | Pos. | Nation | Player |
|---|---|---|---|
| 13 | MF | GER | Timo Gebhart (to 1. FC Nürnberg) |
| 17 | DF | FRA | Matthieu Delpierre (to 1899 Hoffenheim) |
| 21 | DF | NED | Khalid Boulahrouz (to Sporting CP) |
| 23 | FW | GER | Julian Schieber (to Borussia Dortmund) |
| 27 | DF | GER | Stefano Celozzi (to Eintracht Frankfurt) |

=== Hannover 96 ===
In:

| No. | Pos. | Nation | Player |
|---|---|---|---|
| 10 | MF | HUN | Szabolcs Huszti (from Zenit Saint Petersburg) |
| -- | DF | JPN | Hiroki Sakai (from Kashiwa Reysol) |
| -- | DF | BRA | Felipe (from Standard Liège) |
| -- | MF | SUI | Adrian Nikci (from FC Zürich) |

Out:

| No. | Pos. | Nation | Player |
|---|---|---|---|
| 4 | DF | AUT | Emanuel Pogatetz (to VfL Wolfsburg) |
| 8 | MF | ALB | Altin Lala (to Bayern Munich II) |
| 16 | FW | AUT | Daniel Royer (on loan to 1. FC Köln) |
| 17 | MF | GER | Moritz Stoppelkamp (to 1860 Munich) |

=== VfL Wolfsburg ===
In:

| No. | Pos. | Nation | Player |
|---|---|---|---|
| 32 | DF | BRA | Fagner (from Vasco da Gama) |
| -- | FW | CRO | Srđan Lakić (loan return from 1899 Hoffenheim) |
| -- | FW | CRO | Ivica Olić (from Bayern Munich) |
| -- | FW | CZE | Václav Pilař (from Hradec Králové, previously on loan at Viktoria Plzeň) |
| -- | GK | GER | Patrick Drewes (from VfL Wolfsburg Youth) |
| -- | FW | NED | Bas Dost (from SC Heerenveen) |
| -- | MF | GER | Kevin Pannewitz (from Hansa Rostock) |
| -- | DF | AUT | Emanuel Pogatetz (from Hannover 96) |
| -- | DF | BRA | Naldo (from Werder Bremen) |

Out:

| No. | Pos. | Nation | Player |
|---|---|---|---|
| 9 | FW | TUR | Tuncay (to Bursaspor) |
| 10 | MF | GER | Thomas Hitzlsperger (released) |
| 11 | MF | BIH | Hasan Salihamidžić (released) |
| 12 | GK | GER | André Lenz (retired) |
| 18 | FW | CRO | Mario Mandžukić (to Bayern Munich) |
| 21 | FW | GER | Kevin Scheidhauer (on loan to VfL Bochum) |
| 25 | DF | BRA | Chris (to TSG 1899 Hoffenheim) |
| 28 | FW | CIV | Ibrahim Sissoko (on loan to Panathinaikos F.C.) |
| 36 | DF | GER | Bjarne Thoelke (on loan to Dynamo Dresden) |
| 40 | FW | GER | Sebastian Polter (on loan to 1. FC Nürnberg) |
| -- | FW | SUI | Nassim Ben Khalifa (on loan to Grasshopper Club Zürich, previously on loan at BSC Young Boys) |
| -- | MF | GER | Akaki Gogia (on loan to FC St. Pauli, previously on loan at FC Augsburg) |
| 20 | MF | CZE | Petr Jiráček (to Hamburger SV) |

=== Werder Bremen ===
In:

| No. | Pos. | Nation | Player |
|---|---|---|---|
| 6 | MF | BEL | Kevin De Bruyne (on loan from Chelsea F.C.) |
| 22 | DF | GRE | Sokratis (from Genoa C.F.C, previously on loan) |
| — | FW | GER | Nils Petersen (on loan from Bayern Munich) |
| -- | FW | GER | Johannes Wurtz (from 1. FC Saarbrücken) |
| -- | DF | COD | Assani Lukimya-Mulongoti (from Fortuna Düsseldorf) |
| -- | GK | AUT | Richard Strebinger (from Hertha BSC II) |
| -- | GK | GER | Raphael Wolf (from Kapfenberger SV) |
| -- | DF | CZE | Theodor Gebre Selassie (from Slovan Liberec) |
| -- | FW | NED | Eljero Elia (from Juventus FC) |

Out:

| No. | Pos. | Nation | Player |
|---|---|---|---|
| 1 | GK | GER | Tim Wiese (to 1899 Hoffenheim) |
| 4 | DF | BRA | Naldo (to VfL Wolfsburg) |
| 6 | MF | GER | Tim Borowski (retired) |
| 10 | MF | GER | Marko Marin (to Chelsea) |
| 11 | FW | SWE | Markus Rosenberg (to West Bromwich Albion) |
| 16 | DF | FRA | Mikaël Silvestre (released) |
| 24 | FW | PER | Claudio Pizarro (to Bayern Munich) |
| 36 | FW | GER | Lennart Thy (to FC St. Pauli) |
| 37 | DF | GER | Leon Balogun (to Fortuna Düsseldorf) |
| -- | FW | GER | Sandro Wagner (to Hertha BSC, previously on loan at 1. FC Kaiserslautern) |

=== 1. FC Nürnberg ===
In:

| No. | Pos. | Nation | Player |
|---|---|---|---|
| -- | MF | GER | Timo Gebhart (from VfB Stuttgart) |
| -- | MF | JPN | Hiroshi Kiyotake (from Cerezo Osaka) |
| -- | FW | GER | Sebastian Polter (on loan from VfL Wolfsburg) |
| -- | FW | CMR | Roussel Ngankam (from Hertha BSC II) |
| -- | DF | BRA | Marcos António (from FC Rapid București) |

Out:

| No. | Pos. | Nation | Player |
|---|---|---|---|
| 6 | DF | GER | Dominic Maroh (to 1. FC Köln) |
| 8 | FW | GER | Christian Eigler (to FC Ingolstadt 04) |
| 10 | FW | SUI | Albert Bunjaku (to 1. FC Kaiserslautern) |
| 13 | MF | GER | Jens Hegeler (loan return to Bayer 04 Leverkusen) |
| 16 | MF | GER | Juri Judt (to RB Leipzig) |
| 20 | MF | GER | Daniel Didavi (loan return to VfB Stuttgart) |
| 28 | MF | GER | Manuel Zeitz (on loan to SC Paderborn 07) |
| 38 | DF | GER | Philipp Wollscheid (to Bayer 04 Leverkusen) |
| -- | FW | GER | Christoph Sauter (to Karlsruher SC, previously on loan at VfR Aalen) |

=== TSG 1899 Hoffenheim ===
In:

| No. | Pos. | Nation | Player |
|---|---|---|---|
| 1 | GK | GER | Tim Wiese (from Werder Bremen) |
| 8 | FW | SRB | Filip Malbašić (from FK Rad) |
| 11 | FW | SUI | Eren Derdiyok (from Bayer 04 Leverkusen) |
| 14 | DF | BRA | Chris (from VfL Wolfsburg) |
| 15 | DF | FRA | Matthieu Delpierre (from VfB Stuttgart) |
| 18 | FW | ESP | Joselu (from Real Madrid) |
| 40 | MF | PHI | Stephan Schröck (from SpVgg Greuther Fürth) |
| 32 | MF | USA | Joseph-Claude Gyau (from 1899 Hoffenheim II) |
| 33 | FW | JPN | Takashi Usami (on loan from Gamba Osaka, previously on loan at Bayern Munich) |

Out:

| No. | Pos. | Nation | Player |
|---|---|---|---|
| 1 | GK | GER | Daniel Haas (to 1. FC Union Berlin) |
| 8 | FW | ZIM | Knowledge Musona (on loan to FC Augsburg) |
| 15 | FW | GER | Peniel Mlapa (to Borussia Mönchengladbach) |
| 26 | DF | AUT | Andreas Ibertsberger (released) |
| 31 | MF | GER | Tobias Strobl (on loan to 1. FC Köln) |
| 33 | GK | GER | Tom Starke (to Bayern Munich) |
| 37 | DF | GER | Manuel Gulde (to SC Paderborn 07) |
| 39 | FW | CRO | Srđan Lakić (loan return to VfL Wolfsburg) |
| 41 | DF | GER | Philipp Klingmann (to Karlsruher SC) |
| -- | FW | NGR | Chinedu Obasi (to FC Schalke 04, previously on loan) |
| -- | MF | ISL | Gylfi Sigurðsson (to Tottenham Hotspur, previously on loan to Swansea City) |
| -- | MF | ARG | Franco Zuculini (to Real Zaragoza) |
| -- | DF | FIN | Jukka Raitala (to SC Heerenveen, previously on loan at CA Osasuna) |
| -- | MF | BRA | Wellington (released, previously on loan at Linense) |

=== SC Freiburg ===
In:

| No. | Pos. | Nation | Player |
|---|---|---|---|
| 6 | DF | NOR | Vegar Eggen Hedenstad (from Stabæk) |
| 16 | MF | ESP | Ezequiel (on loan from Real Betis) |
| 20 | MF | GER | Max Kruse (from FC St. Pauli) |
| 22 | FW | GER | Marco Terrazzino (from Karlsruher SC) |

Out:

| No. | Pos. | Nation | Player |
|---|---|---|---|
| 15 | DF | GER | Oliver Barth (to VfR Aalen) |
| 16 | DF | DEN | Michael Lumb (loan return to Zenit St. Petersburg) |
| 20 | DF | GER | Andreas Hinkel (retired) |
| 27 | FW | GER | Stefan Reisinger (to Fortuna Düsseldorf) |

=== 1. FSV Mainz 05 ===
In:

| No. | Pos. | Nation | Player |
|---|---|---|---|
| 17 | FW | GER | Chinedu Ede (from 1. FC Union Berlin) |
| -- | DF | CRC | Júnior Díaz (from Club Brugge K.V.) |

Out:

| No. | Pos. | Nation | Player |
|---|---|---|---|
| 9 | FW | TUN | Sami Allagui (to Hertha BSC) |
| 13 | FW | NGR | Anthony Ujah (on loan to 1. FC Köln) |
| 17 | FW | HUN | Zoltán Stieber (to SpVgg Greuther Fürth) |
| 18 | DF | GER | Malik Fathi (on loan to Kayserispor) |
| 22 | FW | SUI | Mario Gavranović (loan return to FC Schalke 04) |
| 30 | FW | TUR | Deniz Yılmaz (on loan to SC Paderborn 07) |
| 34 | DF | GER | Fabian Schönheim (on loan to 1. FC Union Berlin) |
| 35 | FW | EGY | Mohamed Zidan (to Baniyas SC) |
| 35 | FW | CRO | Petar Slišković (on loan to Dynamo Dresden) |

=== FC Augsburg ===
In:

| No. | Pos. | Nation | Player |
|---|---|---|---|
| 5 | DF | EST | Ragnar Klavan (from AZ) |
| 11 | FW | CZE | Milan Petržela (from FC Viktoria Plzeň) |
| 14 | MF | CZE | Jan Morávek (from FC Schalke 04, previously on loan) |
| 16 | MF | GER | Andreas Ottl (from Hertha BSC) |
| -- | FW | ZIM | Knowledge Musona (on loan from 1899 Hoffenheim) |
| -- | DF | GER | Ronny Philp (from Jahn Regensburg) |
| -- | DF | GER | Matthias Strohmaier (from TSV 1860 Munich youth) |
| -- | MF | GER | Kevin Vogt (from VfL Bochum) |
| -- | FW | BFA | Aristide Bancé (from Al-Ahli Dubai) |

Out:

| No. | Pos. | Nation | Player |
|---|---|---|---|
| 8 | MF | GER | Axel Bellinghausen (to Fortuna Düsseldorf) |
| 11 | FW | ANG | Nando Rafael (to Fortuna Düsseldorf) |
| 20 | MF | CMR | Marcel Ndjeng (to Hertha BSC) |
| 22 | FW | ALB | Edmond Kapllani (to FSV Frankfurt) |
| 24 | MF | GER | Daniel Brinkmann (to Energie Cottbus) |
| 28 | MF | GER | Akaki Gogia (loan return to VfL Wolfsburg) |

=== Hamburger SV ===
In:

| No. | Pos. | Nation | Player |
|---|---|---|---|
| 10 | FW | LAT | Artjoms Rudņevs (from Lech Poznań) |
| 15 | GK | GER | Rene Adler (from Bayer 04 Leverkusen) |
| 19 | MF | CZE | Petr Jiráček (from VfL Wolfsburg) |
| 20 | MF | AUT | Paul Scharner (from West Bromwich Albion F.C.) |
| 21 | MF | GER | Maximilian Beister (loan return from Fortuna Düsseldorf) |
| 23 | MF | NED | Rafael van der Vaart (from Tottenham Hotspur) |

Out:

| No. | Pos. | Nation | Player |
|---|---|---|---|
| 9 | FW | PER | Paolo Guerrero (to Corinthians) |
| 10 | FW | CRO | Mladen Petrić (to Fulham F.C.) |
| 17 | MF | TUR | Gökhan Töre (to Rubin Kazan) |
| 27 | MF | GER | Sören Bertram (to VfL Bochum) |
| 42 | MF | SEN | Mickaël Tavares (to Chernomorets Burgas) |

=== SpVgg Greuther Fürth ===
In:

| No. | Pos. | Nation | Player |
|---|---|---|---|
| 27 | FW | DEN | Tobias Mikkelsen (from FC Nordsjælland) |
| -- | GK | GER | Wolfgang Hesl (from Dynamo Dresden) |
| -- | MF | GER | Thomas Pledl (from 1860 Munich youth) |
| -- | MF | GRE | Athanasios Petsos (from Bayer 04 Leverkusen, previously on loan at 1. FC Kaiserslautern) |
| -- | DF | GER | Lasse Sobiech (on loan from Borussia Dortmund, previously on loan at FC St. Pauli) |
| -- | DF | GER | Michael Hefele (from SpVgg Unterhaching) |
| -- | DF | GHA | Baba Rahman (from Asante Kotoko F.C.) |
| -- | FW | HUN | Zoltán Stieber (from 1. FSV Mainz 05) |
| -- | GK | SEN | Issa Ndoye (from FC Volyn Lutsk) |
| -- | FW | SEN | Baye Djiby Fall (from Lokeren) |

Out:

| No. | Pos. | Nation | Player |
|---|---|---|---|
| 3 | DF | BUL | Asen Karaslavov (to Botev Plovdiv) |
| 16 | GK | BIH | Jasmin Fejzić (to VfR Aalen) |
| 15 | DF | GER | Christian Rahn (to Jahn Regensburg) |
| 17 | MF | PHI | Stephan Schröck (to 1899 Hoffenheim) |
| 22 | MF | GER | Dani Schahin (to Fortuna Düsseldorf) |
| 25 | FW | CAN | Olivier Occéan (to Eintracht Frankfurt) |
| 27 | DF | GER | Fabian Baumgärtel (on loan to Alemannia Aachen) |

=== Eintracht Frankfurt ===
In:

| No. | Pos. | Nation | Player |
|---|---|---|---|
| 4 | DF | NOR | Vadim Demidov (from Real Sociedad) |
| 23 | DF | BRA | Anderson Bamba (from Borussia Mönchengladbach, previously on loan) |
| -- | MF | GER | Stefan Aigner (from 1860 Munich) |
| -- | DF | GER | Stefano Celozzi (from VfB Stuttgart) |
| -- | GK | GER | Kevin Trapp (from 1. FC Kaiserslautern) |
| -- | DF | GER | Bastian Oczipka (from Bayer 04 Leverkusen) |
| -- | MF | GER | Martin Lanig (from 1. FC Köln) |
| -- | FW | CAN | Olivier Occéan (from SpVgg Greuther Fürth) |
| -- | MF | JPN | Takashi Inui (from VfL Bochum) |

Out:

| No. | Pos. | Nation | Player |
|---|---|---|---|
| 8 | MF | GER | Matthias Lehmann (to 1. FC Köln) |
| 11 | FW | AUT | Ümit Korkmaz (to FC Ingolstadt 04) |
| 18 | FW | CMR | Mohamadou Idrissou (to 1. FC Kaiserslautern) |
| 25 | FW | GER | Marcos Alvarez (to Stuttgarter Kickers) |
| 37 | DF | GER | Anthony Jung (to FSV Frankfurt) |
| -- | MF | USA | Ricardo Clark (to Houston Dynamo, previously on loan at Stabæk IF) |

=== Fortuna Düsseldorf ===
In:

| No. | Pos. | Nation | Player |
|---|---|---|---|
| 3 | DF | GER | Leon Balogun (from Werder Bremen) |
| 8 | FW | GER | Andre Fomitschow (from VfL Wolfsburg II) |
| 9 | FW | ANG | Nando Rafael (from FC Augsburg) |
| 11 | MF | GER | Axel Bellinghausen (from FC Augsburg) |
| 14 | DF | BRA | Bruno Soares (from MSV Duisburg) |
| 15 | MF | CRO | Ivan Paurević (from Borussia Dortmund II) |
| 16 | FW | GER | Gerrit Wegkamp (from VfL Osnabrück) |
| 18 | MF | GER | Ronny Garbuschewski (from Chemnitzer FC) |
| 19 | DF | GER | Tobias Levels (from Borussia Mönchengladbach, previously on loan) |
| 20 | MF | GER | Dani Schahin (from SpVgg Greuther Fürth) |
| 22 | DF | KOR | Cha Du-Ri (from Celtic F.C.) |
| 27 | FW | GER | Stefan Reisinger (from SC Freiburg) |
| 30 | FW | UKR | Andriy Voronin (on loan from Dynamo Moscow) |
| 32 | MF | GER | Bastian Müller (from FC Bayern München II) |
| 33 | GK | GER | Fabian Giefer (from Bayer 04 Leverkusen) |
| -- | GK | GRE | Nikolaos Papadopoulos (from Olympiacos F.C.) |

Out:

| No. | Pos. | Nation | Player |
|---|---|---|---|
| 5 | DF | COD | Assani Lukimya-Mulongoti (to Werder Bremen) |
| 8 | MF | GER | Sascha Dum (released) |
| 9 | FW | SRB | Ranisav Jovanović (to MSV Duisburg) |
| 18 | FW | GER | Thomas Bröker (to 1. FC Köln) |
| 30 | FW | GER | Sascha Rösler (to Alemannia Aachen) |
| 31 | DF | GER | Kai Schwertfeger (to Alemannia Aachen) |
| 33 | GK | GER | Markus Krauss (to Stuttgarter Kickers) |

== 2. Bundesliga ==
=== Hertha BSC ===
In:

| No. | Pos. | Nation | Player |
|---|---|---|---|
| 7 | MF | AUT | Daniel Beichler (loan return from SV Ried) |
| 8 | MF | CMR | Marcel Ndjeng (from FC Augsburg) |
| 11 | FW | TUN | Sami Allagui (from 1. FSV Mainz 05) |
| 15 | FW | GER | Elias Kachunga (on loan from Borussia Mönchengladbach, previously on loan at VfL Osnabrück) |
| 16 | FW | ISR | Ben Sahar (from RCD Espanyol, previously on loan at AJ Auxerre) |
| 25 | MF | GER | Peer Kluge (from FC Schalke 04) |
| 29 | MF | GER | Marvin Knoll (loan return from Dynamo Dresden) |
| 33 | FW | GER | Sandro Wagner (from Werder Bremen, previously on loan at 1. FC Kaiserslautern) |

Out:

| No. | Pos. | Nation | Player |
|---|---|---|---|
| 1 | GK | NED | Maikel Aerts (released) |
| 2 | DF | GER | Christian Lell (to Levante UD) |
| 5 | DF | CRO | Andre Mijatović (to FC Ingolstadt 04) |
| 8 | MF | GER | Andreas Ottl (to FC Augsburg) |
| 10 | MF | BRA | Raffael (to FC Dynamo Kyiv) |
| 11 | MF | TUR | Tunay Torun (to VfB Stuttgart) |
| 14 | DF | GER | Sebastian Neumann (to Hertha BSC II) |
| 20 | MF | GER | Patrick Ebert (to Real Valladolid) |
| 20 | FW | AUT | Marco Djuricin (on loan to Jahn Regensburg) |
| 23 | MF | GER | Fanol Perdedaj (to Hertha BSC II) |

=== 1. FC Köln ===
In:

| No. | Pos. | Nation | Player |
|---|---|---|---|
| -- | FW | GER | Thomas Bröker (from Fortuna Düsseldorf) |
| -- | MF | GER | Tobias Strobl (on loan from 1899 Hoffenheim) |
| -- | DF | GER | Dominic Maroh (from 1. FC Nürnberg) |
| -- | MF | GER | Matthias Lehmann (from Eintracht Frankfurt) |
| -- | FW | AUT | Daniel Royer (on loan from Hannover 96) |
| -- | DF | AUT | Kevin Wimmer (from LASK Linz) |
| -- | FW | NGR | Anthony Ujah (on loan from 1. FSV Mainz 05) |

Out:

| No. | Pos. | Nation | Player |
|---|---|---|---|
| 1 | GK | GER | Michael Rensing (to Bayer Leverkusen) |
| 5 | DF | GER | Sascha Riether (on loan to Fulham F.C.) |
| 10 | FW | GER | Lukas Podolski (to Arsenal) |
| 11 | FW | SLO | Milivoje Novaković (to Omiya Ardija) |
| 13 | MF | GER | Martin Lanig (to Eintracht Frankfurt) |
| 22 | GK | CRO | Miro Varvodić (to FK Qarabağ) |
| 31 | FW | GER | Mark Uth (to SC Heerenveen) |
| 33 | MF | GER | Mitchell Weiser (to Bayern Munich) |
| -- | FW | GER | Simon Terodde (to 1. FC Union Berlin, previously on loan) |

=== 1. FC Kaiserslautern ===
In:

| No. | Pos. | Nation | Player |
|---|---|---|---|
| -- | MF | GER | Mimoun Azaouagh (from VfL Bochum) |
| -- | FW | SUI | Albert Bunjaku (from 1. FC Nürnberg) |
| -- | FW | BUL | Iliyan Mitsanski (loan return from FSV Frankfurt) |
| -- | MF | AUT | Clemens Walch (loan return from Dynamo Dresden) |
| -- | GK | GER | David Hohs (from Alemannia Aachen) |
| -- | MF | GER | Enis Alushi (from SC Paderborn 07) |
| -- | FW | GHA | Kwame Nsor (from FC Metz) |
| -- | DF | TUN | Enis Hajri (from Henan Jianye F.C.) |
| -- | FW | CMR | Mohamadou Idrissou (from Eintracht Frankfurt) |

Out:

| No. | Pos. | Nation | Player |
|---|---|---|---|
| 7 | MF | GER | Oliver Kirch (to Borussia Dortmund) |
| 8 | MF | GER | Christian Tiffert (to Seattle Sounders FC) |
| 10 | MF | TUR | Olcay Şahan (to Beşiktaş J.K.) |
| 11 | FW | GER | Sandro Wagner (loan return to Werder Bremen) |
| 13 | MF | GRE | Athanasios Petsos (loan return to Bayer 04 Leverkusen) |
| 18 | FW | GER | Richard Sukuta-Pasu (on loan to Sturm Graz) |
| 22 | FW | DEN | Nicolai Jørgensen (loan return to Bayer 04 Leverkusen) |
| 29 | GK | GER | Kevin Trapp (to Eintracht Frankfurt) |
| 31 | FW | POL | Jakub Świerczok (on loan to Piast Gliwice) |
| -- | MF | AUT | Clemens Walch (to SV Ried, previously on loan at Dynamo Dresden) |

=== FC St. Pauli ===
In:

| No. | Pos. | Nation | Player |
|---|---|---|---|
| 2 | MF | GER | Florian Kringe (from Borussia Dortmund) |
| 5 | DF | PER | Carlos Zambrano (from FC Schalke 04, previously on loan) |
| 18 | FW | GER | Lennart Thy (from Werder Bremen) |
| -- | DF | GER | Sören Gonther (from SC Paderborn 07) |
| -- | DF | GER | Florian Mohr (from SC Paderborn 07) |
| -- | FW | GER | Daniel Ginczek (on loan from Borussia Dortmund, previously on loan at VfL Bochum) |
| -- | MF | GER | Akaki Gogia (on loan from VfL Wolfsburg, previously on loan at FC Augsburg) |

Out:

| No. | Pos. | Nation | Player |
|---|---|---|---|
| 2 | DF | GER | Moritz Volz (to TSV 1860 Munich) |
| 3 | DF | GER | Lasse Sobiech (loan return to Borussia Dortmund) |
| 4 | DF | GER | Fabio Morena (to SV Sandhausen) |
| 18 | MF | GER | Max Kruse (to SC Freiburg) |
| 23 | FW | GER | Deniz Naki (to SC Paderborn 07) |
| 24 | DF | GER | Carsten Rothenbach (to VfL Bochum) |
| 29 | GK | GER | Philipp Heerwagen (loan return to VfL Bochum) |
| 34 | GK | GER | Arvid Schenk (released) |

=== SC Paderborn 07 ===
In:

| No. | Pos. | Nation | Player |
|---|---|---|---|
| 10 | FW | TUR | Deniz Yılmaz (on loan from 1. FSV Mainz 05) |
| -- | MF | GER | Tobias Kempe (from FC Erzgebirge Aue) |
| -- | MF | GER | Mario Vrančić (from Borussia Dortmund II) |
| -- | DF | GER | Patrick Ziegler (from SpVgg Unterhaching) |
| -- | DF | GER | Tobias Feisthammel (from Alemannia Aachen) |
| -- | MF | GER | Manuel Zeitz (on loan from 1. FC Nürnberg) |
| -- | DF | GER | Manuel Gulde (from 1899 Hoffenheim) |
| -- | MF | ITA | Massimo Ornatelli (from Preußen Münster) |
| 31 | FW | GER | Deniz Naki (from FC St. Pauli) |

Out:

| No. | Pos. | Nation | Player |
|---|---|---|---|
| 5 | MF | GER | Enis Alushi (to 1. FC Kaiserslautern) |
| 6 | DF | GER | Florian Mohr (to FC St. Pauli) |
| 8 | FW | USA | Matthew Taylor (to SC Preußen Münster) |
| 9 | FW | GER | Nick Proschwitz (to Hull City A.F.C.) |
| 10 | MF | TUR | Mehmet Kara (to Gençlerbirliği S.K.) |
| 11 | MF | GER | Lukas Rupp (loan return to Borussia Mönchengladbach) |
| 12 | MF | GER | Sören Brandy (to MSV Duisburg) |
| 26 | DF | GER | Sören Gonther (to FC St. Pauli) |

=== TSV 1860 Munich ===
In:

| No. | Pos. | Nation | Player |
|---|---|---|---|
| 21 | MF | GRE | Grigoris Makos (from AEK Athens F.C.) |
| -- | DF | POL | Grzegorz Wojtkowiak (from Lech Poznań) |
| -- | DF | GER | Moritz Volz (from FC St. Pauli) |
| -- | DF | GER | Moritz Stoppelkamp (from Hannover 96) |
| -- | MF | CRO | Marin Tomasov (from Hajduk Split) |
| -- | FW | GER | Korbinian Vollmann (loan return from SpVgg Unterhaching) |

Out:

| No. | Pos. | Nation | Player |
|---|---|---|---|
| 15 | MF | GER | Stefan Aigner (to Eintracht Frankfurt) |
| 17 | MF | GER | Stefan Buck (to Bayern Munich II) |
| 21 | MF | GER | Sandro Kaiser (to 1. FC Heidenheim) |
| -- | DF | GER | Jonatan Kotzke (to Jahn Regensburg) |

=== 1. FC Union Berlin ===
In:

| No. | Pos. | Nation | Player |
|---|---|---|---|
| 11 | FW | GER | Simon Terodde (from 1. FC Köln, previously on loan) |
| 32 | FW | SVK | Adam Nemec (from FC Ingolstadt 04) |
| -- | DF | GER | Björn Kopplin (from VfL Bochum) |
| -- | GK | GER | Daniel Haas (from 1899 Hoffenheim) |
| -- | DF | GER | Fabian Schönheim (on loan from 1. FSV Mainz 05) |
| -- | DF | CRO | Roberto Punčec (on loan from Maccabi Tel Aviv) |
| -- | MF | CHI | Felipe Gallegos (on loan from Universidad de Chile) |

Out:

| No. | Pos. | Nation | Player |
|---|---|---|---|
| 5 | DF | ALG | Ahmed Reda Madouni (to FC Nantes) |
| 19 | FW | GER | Chinedu Ede (to 1. FSV Mainz 05) |
| 40 | GK | GER | Marcel Höttecke (released) |

=== Eintracht Braunschweig ===
In:

| No. | Pos. | Nation | Player |
|---|---|---|---|
| -- | FW | GER | Jonas Erwig-Drüppel (from FC Schalke 04 II) |
| -- | MF | GER | Björn Kluft (from Preußen Münster) |
| -- | MF | GER | Kevin Kratz (from Alemannia Aachen) |
| -- | FW | SUI | Orhan Ademi (from SC Rheindorf Altach) |

Out:

| No. | Pos. | Nation | Player |
|---|---|---|---|
| 9 | FW | GER | Mathias Fetsch (to Kickers Offenbach) |
| 20 | MF | GER | Nico Zimmermann (to VfR Aalen) |
| 23 | MF | GER | Julius Reinhardt (to Kickers Offenbach) |

=== Dynamo Dresden ===
In:

| No. | Pos. | Nation | Player |
|---|---|---|---|
| 1 | GK | GER | Markus Scholz (from VfL Bochum) |
| 7 | MF | FRA | Idir Ouali (from Le Mans) |
| 11 | MF | FRA | Anthony Losilla (from Laval) |
| 14 | MF | MNE | Hasan Pepić (from Karlsruher SC II) |
| 20 | DF | TUR | Cüneyt Köz (from Bayern Munich II) |
| 22 | DF | GER | Bjarne Thoelke (on loan from VfL Wolfsburg) |
| 29 | MF | GER | Tobias Jänicke (from Hansa Rostock) |
| 31 | FW | CRO | Petar Slišković (on loan from FSV Mainz 05) |
| 35 | GK | GER | Florian Fromlowitz (from MSV Duisburg) |
| 38 | MF | GER | Tobias Müller (from Dynamo Dresden youth) |
| 39 | FW | FRA | Lynel Kitambala (from Saint-Étienne) |

Out:

| No. | Pos. | Nation | Player |
|---|---|---|---|
| 1 | GK | GER | Dennis Eilhoff (released) |
| 3 | DF | GER | Alexander Schnetzler (to SC Pfullendorf) |
| 7 | MF | GER | Marcel Heller (to Alemannia Aachen) |
| 11 | MF | GER | Gerrit Müller (to 1. FC Heidenheim) |
| 14 | MF | GER | Maik Kegel (to Chemnitzer FC) |
| 16 | DF | GER | Martin Stoll (to Karlsruher SC) |
| 18 | MF | AUT | Clemens Walch (loan return to 1. FC Kaiserslautern) |
| 20 | MF | GER | Marvin Knoll (loan return to Hertha BSC) |
| 22 | FW | SLO | Zlatko Dedic (loan return to VfL Bochum) |
| 30 | GK | GER | Wolfgang Hesl (to SpVgg Greuther Fürth) |
| 33 | DF | GER | Jens Möckel (to Rot-Weiss Erfurt) |
| 38 | MF | GER | Sascha Pfeffer (to Chemnitzer FC) |

=== MSV Duisburg ===
In:

| No. | Pos. | Nation | Player |
|---|---|---|---|
| -- | MF | GER | Sören Brandy (from SC Paderborn 07) |
| -- | DF | GER | Julian Koch (on loan from Borussia Dortmund) |
| -- | DF | TUN | Adli Lachheb (from Erzgebirge Aue) |
| -- | FW | SRB | Ranisav Jovanović (from Fortuna Düsseldorf) |
| -- | MF | BRA | Antônio da Silva (from Borussia Dortmund) |

Out:

| No. | Pos. | Nation | Player |
|---|---|---|---|
| 5 | DF | GER | Daniel Reiche (to SV Babelsberg 03) |
| 14 | DF | BRA | Bruno Soares (to Fortuna Düsseldorf) |
| 23 | GK | GER | Florian Fromlowitz (to Dynamo Dresden) |
| 27 | FW | ROU | Emil Jula (on loan to Anorthosis Famagusta FC) |

=== VfL Bochum ===
In:

| No. | Pos. | Nation | Player |
|---|---|---|---|
| 8 | MF | JPN | Yusuke Tasaka (from Kawasaki Frontale) |
| -- | MF | GER | Sören Bertram (from Hamburger SV) |
| -- | DF | GER | Florian Brügmann (from Hamburger SV II) |
| -- | DF | GER | Mounir Chaftar (from Wacker Burghausen) |
| -- | FW | SLO | Zlatko Dedič (loan return from Dynamo Dresden) |
| -- | MF | GER | Leon Goretzka (from VfL Bochum youth) |
| -- | GK | GER | Philipp Heerwagen (loan return from FC St. Pauli) |
| -- | FW | GEO | Alexander Iashvili (from Karlsruher SC) |
| -- | DF | GER | Carsten Rothenbach (from FC St. Pauli) |
| -- | MF | GER | Marc Rzatkowski (loan return from Arminia Bielefeld) |
| -- | FW | GER | Kevin Scheidhauer (on loan from VfL Wolfsburg) |

Out:

| No. | Pos. | Nation | Player |
|---|---|---|---|
| 2 | DF | GER | Björn Kopplin (to 1. FC Union Berlin) |
| 10 | MF | GER | Mimoun Azaouagh (to 1. FC Kaiserslautern) |
| 11 | MF | JPN | Takashi Inui (to Eintracht Frankfurt) |
| 14 | MF | AUT | Denis Berger (to Hansa Rostock) |
| 16 | MF | GER | Kevin Vogt (to FC Augsburg) |
| 17 | FW | GER | Oğuzhan Kefkir (to Alemannia Aachen) |
| 18 | MF | ITA | Giovanni Federico (retired) |
| 19 | MF | GER | Kevin Freiberger (to Wacker Burghausen) |
| 21 | FW | GER | Daniel Ginczek (loan return to Borussia Dortmund) |
| 24 | DF | GER | Philipp Bönig (released) |
| 28 | DF | SWE | Matias Concha (to Malmö FF) |
| 29 | GK | GER | Markus Scholz (to Dynamo Dresden) |

=== FC Ingolstadt 04 ===
In:

| No. | Pos. | Nation | Player |
|---|---|---|---|
| 18 | MF | GER | Christian Eigler (from 1. FC Nürnberg) |
| 21 | DF | GER | Danny da Costa (on loan from Bayer 04 Leverkusen) |
| -- | FW | GER | Reagy Ofosu (from Hamburger SV II) |
| -- | FW | TUR | Alper Uludağ (from Alemannia Aachen) |
| -- | FW | AUT | Ümit Korkmaz (from Eintracht Frankfurt) |
| -- | MF | GER | Pascal Groß (from Karlsruher SC) |
| -- | DF | CRO | Andre Mijatović (from Hertha BSC) |

Out:

| No. | Pos. | Nation | Player |
|---|---|---|---|
| 4 | DF | GER | David Pisot (to VfL Osnabrück) |
| 5 | MF | GER | Manuel Hartmann (to Holstein Kiel) |
| 14 | FW | SVK | Adam Nemec (to 1. FC Union Berlin) |
| 18 | MF | BFA | Moïse Bambara (to FSV Frankfurt) |
| 20 | DF | BEL | Kristoffer Andersen (to Alemannia Aachen) |
| -- | DF | GER | Mathias Wittek (to 1. FC Heidenheim, previously on loan) |

=== FSV Frankfurt ===
In:

| No. | Pos. | Nation | Player |
|---|---|---|---|
| 9 | FW | ALB | Edmond Kapllani (from FC Augsburg) |
| 11 | FW | NED | John Verhoek (on loan from Stade Rennais F.C.) |
| 18 | MF | BFA | Moïse Bambara (from FC Ingolstadt 04) |
| 20 | FW | AUS | Mathew Leckie (on Loan from Borussia Mönchengladbach) |
| -- | DF | GER | Tim Heubach (from Borussia Mönchengladbach II) |
| -- | GK | GER | Sören Pirson (from Ergotelis F.C.) |
| -- | DF | GER | Anthony Jung (from Eintracht Frankfurt) |

Out:

| No. | Pos. | Nation | Player |
|---|---|---|---|
| 2 | DF | PHI | Dennis Cagara (to Karlsruher SC) |
| 6 | MF | GER | Daniel Gordon (to Karlsruher SC) |
| 9 | FW | ALG | Karim Benyamina (to Karlsruher SC) |
| 11 | FW | GER | Mario Fillinger (to FC Rot-Weiß Erfurt) |
| 18 | FW | BUL | Iliyan Mitsanski (loan return to 1. FC Kaiserslautern) |
| 22 | MF | GER | Samil Cinaz (to Orduspor) |
| 25 | GK | AUT | Michael Langer (to SV Sandhausen) |

=== Energie Cottbus ===
In:

| No. | Pos. | Nation | Player |
|---|---|---|---|
| 27 | FW | CIV | Boubacar Sanogo (from AS Saint-Étienne) |
| -- | MF | GER | Daniel Brinkmann (from FC Augsburg) |
| -- | FW | GER | Sebastian Glasner (from Wacker Burghausen) |
| -- | FW | GER | Marco Stiepermann (from Borussia Dortmund, previously on loan at Alemannia Aachen) |
| -- | MF | FRA | Nicolas Farina (from Evian F.C.) |
| -- | DF | FRA | Guillaume Rippert (from Evian Thonon Gaillard F.C.) |

Out:

| No. | Pos. | Nation | Player |
|---|---|---|---|
| 8 | FW | BUL | Dimitar Rangelov (loan return to Borussia Dortmund) |
| 32 | MF | GER | Leonardo Bittencourt (to Borussia Dortmund) |
| 34 | FW | NED | Jules Reimerink (to VVV-Venlo) |
| -- | DF | CAN | Adam Straith (released, previously on loan at 1. FC Saarbrücken) |
| -- | MF | SLO | Rok Kronaveter (to Győri ETO FC) |

=== FC Erzgebirge Aue ===
In:

| No. | Pos. | Nation | Player |
|---|---|---|---|
| -- | DF | AUT | Ronald Gërçaliu (from ŁKS Łódź) |
| -- | MF | GER | Nils Miatke (from FC Carl Zeiss Jena) |
| -- | DF | GER | Tobias Nickenig (from Orduspor) |
| -- | MF | ROU | Vlad Munteanu (from Concordia Chiajna) |
| -- | GK | GER | Tom Neukam (from Werder Bremen youth) |
| -- | FW | SVK | Jakub Sylvestr (on loan from Dinamo Zagreb) |

Out:

| No. | Pos. | Nation | Player |
|---|---|---|---|
| 5 | DF | TUN | Adli Lachheb (to MSV Duisburg) |
| 13 | FW | GER | Kevin Stephan (loan return to Hertha BSC II) |
| 19 | FW | GER | Patrick Sonntag (to Sportfreunde Siegen) |
| 24 | GK | GER | Michael Arnold (to Budissa Bautzen) |
| 27 | MF | GER | Tobias Kempe (to SC Paderborn 07) |

=== SV Sandhausen ===
In:

| No. | Pos. | Nation | Player |
|---|---|---|---|
| -- | DF | GER | Timo Achenbach (from Alemannia Aachen) |
| -- | FW | GER | Nicky Adler (from Wacker Burghausen) |
| -- | FW | GER | Alexander Riemann (on loan from VfB Stuttgart II) |
| -- | MF | GER | Simon Tüting (from Chemnitzer FC) |
| -- | DF | GER | Kim Falkenberg (from Alemannia Aachen) |
| -- | GK | AUT | Michael Langer (from FSV Frankfurt) |
| -- | DF | GER | Fabio Morena (from FC St. Pauli) |

Out:

| No. | Pos. | Nation | Player |
|---|---|---|---|
| 25 | MF | GER | Danny Blum (on loan to Karlsruher SC) |
| 26 | MF | GER | Dominik Rohracker (to SpVgg Unterhaching) |

=== VfR Aalen ===
In:

| No. | Pos. | Nation | Player |
|---|---|---|---|
| -- | GK | BIH | Jasmin Fejzić (from SpVgg Greuther Fürth) |
| -- | DF | GER | Benjamin Hübner (from Wehen Wiesbaden) |
| -- | MF | SLO | Kevin Kampl (from VfL Osnabrück) |
| -- | FW | GER | Michael Klauß (from Jahn Regensburg) |
| -- | FW | GER | Marcel Reichwein (from Rot-Weiß Erfurt) |
| -- | MF | GER | Nico Zimmermann (from Eintracht Braunschweig) |
| -- | MF | GER | Manuel Junglas (from Alemannia Aachen) |
| -- | DF | GER | Oliver Barth (from SC Freiburg) |
| -- | MF | GER | Daniel Buballa (from 1. FSV Mainz 05 II) |

Out:

| No. | Pos. | Nation | Player |
|---|---|---|---|
| 6 | DF | GER | Sascha Herröder (to Alemannia Aachen) |
| 8 | MF | GER | Roberto Pinto (released) |
| 15 | FW | GER | Christoph Sauter (loan return to 1. FC Nürnberg) |
| 20 | MF | GER | Jonas Marz (to KSV Hessen Kassel) |

=== Jahn Regensburg ===
In:

| No. | Pos. | Nation | Player |
|---|---|---|---|
| 3 | DF | GER | Christian Rahn (from SpVgg Greuther Fürth) |
| 39 | FW | AUT | Marco Djuricin (on loan from Hertha BSC) |
| -- | MF | GER | Patrick Haag (from Karlsruher SC II) |
| -- | MF | MAR | Abdenour Amachaibou (from SpVgg Unterhaching) |
| -- | MF | GER | Denis Weidlich (from Rot-Weiß Erfurt) |
| -- | DF | GER | Jonatan Kotzke (from 1860 Munich) |
| -- | FW | GER | Koray Altinay (from Bayern Munich II) |
| -- | MF | GER | Marius Müller (from FSV Frankfurt II) |
| -- | FW | CGO | Francky Sembolo (from SV Wilhelmshaven) |

Out:

| No. | Pos. | Nation | Player |
|---|---|---|---|
| 5 | DF | GER | Ronny Philp (to FC Augsburg) |
| 7 | MF | GER | Tobias Schweinsteiger (to Bayern Munich II) |
| 11 | FW | GER | Michael Klauß (to VfR Aalen) |
| 12 | MF | TUR | Selçuk Alibaz (to Karlsruher SC) |
| 36 | FW | GER | Jürgen Schmid (to SV Breitenbrunn) |

== See also ==
- 2012–13 Bundesliga
- 2012–13 2. Bundesliga
