= 2012–13 Dynamo Dresden season =

Dynamo Dresden
2012–13 season
- Chairman: Andreas Ritter
- Manager: Ralf Loose (to December); Steffen Menze (Interim, December–January); Peter Pacult (from January)
- Stadium: Glücksgas Stadium, Dresden, Saxony
- 2.Bundesliga: 16th
- DFB-Pokal: 2nd Round
- Top goalscorer: League: Mickaël Poté (6); All: Mickaël Poté (7)
Home colours	Away colours

The 2012–13 Dynamo Dresden season is the 63rd season in the club's football history. In 2012–13 the club plays in the 2. Fußball-Bundesliga, the second tier of German football. It is the clubs second consecutive season in this league, having played at this level since 2011–12, after winning promotion from the 3. Liga in 2011.

The club also takes part in the 2012–13 edition of the DFB-Pokal, the German Cup, where it reached the second round and will face Bundesliga side Hannover 96 next.

== Review and events ==
Dynamo Dresden was fined €20,000 for a riot in a DFB-Pokal match against Borussia Dortmund the previous season. The club were only permitted sell 13,000 tickets to their own supporters and 3,000 tickets to supporters of 1860 München for their first home game of the season.

== Matches ==
=== Legend ===
Win Draw Loss Postponed

=== 2. Bundesliga ===
4 August 2012 1	VfL Bochum	2–1	Dynamo Dresden	Bochum
15:30	Goretzka 52'; Freier 85'	Report	28' Poté	Stadium: rewirpowerSTADION; Attendance: 16.191; Referee: R. Hartmann

13 August 2012 2	Dynamo Dresden	2–2	1860 München	Dresden
20:15	Poté 38'; Wojtkowiak 64' (o.g.); Gueye (yellow card) 71'	Report	Lauth 18'; Wojtkowiak (yellow card) 37'; Stahl (yellow card) 58'; Bierofka 74'	Stadium: Glücksgas Stadium; Attendance: 9,500; Referee: Felix Zwayer

25 August 2012 3	MSV Duisburg	1–3	Dynamo Dresden	Duisburg
13:00	Exslager 90+1'	Report	Ouali 4'; Losilla 20'; Papadopoulos (yellow card) 39'; Savić (yellow card) 65'; Poté 78'	Stadium: Schauinsland-Reisen-Arena; Attendance: 10,877; Referee: Tobias Christ

31 August 2012 4	Dynamo Dresden	1–3	1. FC Kaiserslautern	Dresden
18:00	Poté 67'	Report	Bunjaku 29', 74'; Fortounis 82'	Stadium: Glücksgas Stadium; Attendance: 29,057; Referee: Frank Willenborg

15 September 2012 5	SV Sandhausen	1–1	Dynamo Dresden	Sandhausen
13:00	Löning 32'	Report	Losilla 55'	Stadium: Hardtwaldstadion; Attendance: 6,400; Referee: Benjamin Cortus (Nuremberg)

23 September 2012 6	Dynamo Dresden	0–1	FC Ingolstadt 04	Dresden
13:30		Report	Caiuby 60'	Stadium: Glücksgas Stadium; Attendance: 24,000; Referee: Christian Fischer (Hemer)

26 September 2012 7	Hertha BSC	1–0	Dynamo Dresden	Berlin
17:30	Bregerie 5' (o.g.)	Report		Stadium: Olympic Stadium; Attendance: 45,700; Referee: Günter Perl (Munich)

30 September 2012 8	Dynamo Dresden	3–1	Erzgebirge Aue	Dresden
13:30	Bregerie 24', 28'; Jänicke 89'	Report	Sylvestr 83'	Stadium: Glücksgas Stadium; Attendance: 29,200; Referee: Christian Bandurski (Essen)

7 October 2012 9	1. FC Köln	1–1	Dynamo Dresden	Cologne
13:30	Ujah 77'	20:15	Poté 31'	Stadium: RheinEnergieStadion; Attendance: 41,800; Referee: Felix Brych (Munich)

20 October 2012 10	Dynamo Dresden	0–2	Eintracht Braunschweig	Dresden
13:00		Report	Kruppke 37'; Kumbela 79'	Stadium: Glücksgas Stadium; Attendance: 27,500; Referee: Guido Winkmann (Kerken)

28 October 2012 11	FC St. Pauli	3–2	Dynamo Dresden	Hamburg
13:30 CEST (UTC+02:00)	Boll 45'; Avevor 49'; Ginczek 55'; Thorandt (yellow card) 60'	Report (in German)	Ouali 18'; Poté 28'; Losilla (yellow card) 75'; Thoelke (yellow card) 90+1'	Stadium: Millerntor-Stadion; Attendance: 21,045; Referee: Manuel Gräfe

4 November 2012 12	Dynamo Dresden	0–2	1. FC Union Berlin	Dresden
13:30		Report	Schönheim 14', 54'	Stadium: Glücksgas Stadium; Attendance: 29,500; Referee: Günter Perl (Munich)

11 November 2012 13	Energie Cottbus	2–0	Dynamo Dresden	Cottbus
13:30	Sørensen 7'; Banovic 30' (pen.)	Report		Stadium: Stadion der Freundschaft; Attendance: 20,500; Referee: Michael Weiner (Giesen)

16 November 2012 14	Dynamo Dresden	2–1	FSV Frankfurt	Dresden
18:00	Schuppan 5', 15' (pen.)	Report	Leckie 64'	Stadium: Glücksgas Stadium; Attendance: 20,000; Referee: Florian Steuer (Menden)

23 November 2012 15	SC Paderborn 07	2–2	Dynamo Dresden	Paderborn
18:00	Yilmaz 11'; Schuppan 21' (o.g.)	Report	Ouali 14'; Kitambala 38'	Stadium: Benteler Arena; Attendance: 9,100; Referee: Thorsten Schriever (Ottersdorf)

27 November 2012 16	Dynamo Dresden	0–0	VfR Aalen	Dresden
17:30		Report		Stadium: Glücksgas-Stadion; Attendance: 18,800; Referee: Norbert Grudzinski (Hamburg)

30 November 2012 17	Jahn Regensburg	0–0	Dynamo Dresden	Regensburg
18:00		Report		Stadium: Jahn-Stadion; Attendance: 6,500; Referee: Christian Bandurski (Essen)

8 December 2012 18	Dynamo Dresden	0–3	VfL Bochum	Dresden
13:00		Report	Aydin 17'; Dabrowski 25'; Kramer 88'	Stadium: Glücksgas-Stadion; Attendance: 20,700; Referee: Manuel Gräfe (Berlin)

16 December 2012 19	1860 Munich	1–1	Dynamo Dresden	Munich
13:30	Vallori 80'	Report	Gueye 61'	Stadium: Allianz Arena; Attendance: 22,200; Referee: Christian Dingert (Thallichtenberg)

1 February 2013 20	Dynamo Dresden	0–0	MSV Duisburg	Dresden
18:00		Report		Stadium: Glücksgas-Stadion; Attendance: 23,00; Referee: Knut Kircher (Rottenburg)

8 February 2013 21	1. FC Kaiserslautern	3–0	Dynamo Dresden	Kaiserslautern
20:30	Karl 24'; Idrissou 40'; Hoffer 81'	Report		Stadium: Fritz-Walter-Stadion; Attendance: 32,900; Referee: Deniz Aytekin (Oberasbach)

17 February 2013 22	Dynamo Dresden	3–1	SV Sandhausen	Dresden
13:30	Kitambala 7'; Müller 71', 75'	Report	Wooten 57'	Stadium: Glücksgas-Stadion; Attendance: 19,400; Referee: Peter Gagelmann (Bremen)

23 February 2013 23	FC Ingolstadt 04	1–1	Dynamo Dresden	Ingolstadt
13:00	Hartmann 14'	Report	Ouali 83'	Stadium: Audi Sportpark; Attendance: 6,300; Referee: Christian Fischer (Hemer)

2 March 2013 24	Dynamo Dresden	1–0	Hertha BSC	Dresden
13:00	Lasogga 38' (o.g.)	Report		Stadium: Glücksgas-Stadion; Attendance: 29,500; Referee: Michael Weiner (Giesen)

10 March 2013 25	Erzgebirge Aue	1–0	Dynamo Dresden	Aue
13:30	Hochscheidt 29'	Report		Stadium: Erzgebirgsstadion; Attendance: 14,200; Referee: Deniz Aytekin (Oberasbach)

18:00, March 3, 2013 26	Dynamo Dresden	0–2	1. FC Köln	Dresden
20:15		Report	Ujah 73', 81'	Stadium: Glücksgas Stadion; Attendance: 27,300; Referee: Wolfgang Stark (Ergolding)

28 March 2013 27	Eintracht Braunschweig	2–1	Dynamo Dresden	Braunschweig
20:30	Bicakcic 31'; Kumbela 53'	Report	Ouali 8'	Stadium: Eintracht-Stadion; Attendance: 21,200; Referee: Knut Kircher (Rottenburg)

6 April 2013 28	Dynamo Dresden	3–2	FC St. Pauli	Dresden
13:00	Trojan 62'; Losilla 66'; Schuppan 77'	Report	Mohr 50'; Ginczek 53'	Stadium: Glücksgas Stadion; Attendance: 29,200; Referee: Thorsten Kinhöfer (Herne)

12 April 2013 29	1. FC Union Berlin	0–0	Dynamo Dresden	Berlin
18:00		Report		Stadium: Alte Försterei; Attendance: 21,200; Referee: Jochen Drees (Munich)

21 April 2013 30	Dynamo Dresden	1–0	Energie Cottbus	Dresden
13:30	Fort 53'	Report		Stadium: Glücksgas Stadion; Attendance: 29,200; Referee: Peter Sippel (Munich)

27 April 2013 31	FSV Frankfurt	3–1	Dynamo Dresden	Frankfurt
13:00	Stark 55'; Verhoek 67'; Roshi 84'	Report	Fort 86'	Stadium: Frankfurter Volksbank Stadion; Attendance: 6,1000; Referee: Sascha Stegmann (Bonn)

3 May 2013 32	Dynamo Dresden	2–1	SC Paderborn 07	Dresden
18:00	Tobias Müller (footballer born 1993) 35', 70'	Report	Meha 43'	Stadium: Glücksgas Stadion; Attendance: 28,300; Referee: Daniel Siebert (Berlin)

12 May 2013 33	VfR Aalen	3–0	Dynamo Dresden	Aalen
13:30	Kister 39'; Lechleiter 79'; Leandro 89'	Report		Stadium: Scholz-Arena; Attendance: 11,100; Referee: Robert Hartman (Wangen)

19 May 2013 34	Dynamo Dresden	3–1	Jahn Regensburg	Dresden
13:30	Fort 50', 54'; Fiél 83'	Report	Koke 47'	Stadium: Glücksgas Stadion; Attendance: 29,700; Referee: Markus Schmidt (Stuttgart)

=== Relegation play-off ===
24 May 2013	VfL Osnabrück	1–0	Dynamo Dresden	Osnatel-Arena, Osnabrück
20:30 CEST	Manno 43'	Report		Attendance: 15,500; Referee: Günter Perl (Pullach)

28 May 2013	Dynamo Dresden	2–0	VfL Osnabrück	Glücksgas Stadion, Dresden
20:30 CEST	Fiél 31'; Ouali 73'	Report		Attendance: 29.253; Referee: Peter Gagelmann (Bremen)

Dynamo Dresden won 2–1 on aggregate to stay in the 2. Bundesliga

=== DFB-Pokal ===
20 August 2012 1st Round	Chemnitzer FC	0–3	Dynamo Dresden	Chemnitz
18:30		Report (in German)	Koch 32'; Poté 42'; Losilla (yellow card) 50'; Trojan (yellow card) 77'; Buchner 84' (o.g.)	Stadium: Stadion an der Gellertstraße; Attendance: 14.500; Referee: Markus Schmidt

31 October 2012 2nd Round	Hannover 96	1–1 (a.e.t.) (4–3 p)	Dynamo Dresden	Hannover
20:30	Diouf 15'	Report (in German)	Brégerie 28'	Stadium: AWD-Arena; Attendance: 35,000; Referee: Wolfgang Stark
	Penalties
	Stindl (penalty scored); Schmiedebach (penalty scored); Rausch (penalty scored); Sobiech (penalty missed); Schlaudraff (penalty scored)		(penalty missed) Losilla; (penalty scored) Fiél; (penalty scored) Solga; (penalty scored) Jungwirth; (penalty missed) Poté

== Squad ==
Note: Flags indicate national team as defined under FIFA eligibility rules; some limited exceptions apply. Players may hold more than one non-FIFA nationality.

No.	Pos.	Nation	Player
1	GK	GER	Markus Scholz
2	DF	SRB	Vujadin Savić
4	DF	SEN	Cheikh Gueye
5	DF	FRA	Romain Brégerie
6	DF	GER	Florian Jungwirth
7	MF	FRA	Idir Ouali
8	MF	CZE	Filip Trojan
9	FW	CZE	Pavel Fořt
10	FW	BEN	Mickaël Poté
11	MF	FRA	Anthony Losilla
13	GK	GER	Benjamin Kirsten
14	FW	MNE	Hasan Pepić (to January)
17	MF	GER	Lars Jungnickel
18	MF	GER	Tobias Kempe (from January)
19	MF	GRE	Yiannis Papadopoulos
20	DF	TUR	Cüneyt Köz (to January)

No.	Pos.	Nation	Player
21	DF	BIH	Muhamed Subašić
22	DF	GER	Bjarne Thoelke
23	MF	GER	Denis Streker (from January)
24	MF	GER	David Solga
25	MF	GER	Robert Koch
27	DF	GER	Sebastian Schuppan
28	DF	GER	Marcel Franke
29	MF	GER	Tobias Jänicke (from August)
30	FW	BLR	Dmitri Khlebosolov (from January)
31	FW	CRO	Petar Slišković (from August to January)
33	DF	GER	Jens Möckel (to August)
35	GK	GER	Florian Fromlowitz
37	DF	GER	Toni Leistner (to January)
38	MF	GER	Tobias Müller
39	FW	FRA	Lynel Kitambala (from August)
40	MF	ESP	Cristian Fiél

== Transfers ==
=== Summer ===
In:

No.	Pos.	Nation	Player
1	GK	GER	Markus Scholz (from VfL Bochum)
7	MF	FRA	Idir Ouali (from Le Mans)
11	MF	FRA	Anthony Losilla (from Laval)
14	MF	MNE	Hasan Pepić (from Karlsruher SC II)
20	DF	TUR	Cüneyt Köz (from Bayern Munich II)
22	DF	GER	Bjarne Thoelke (on loan from VfL Wolfsburg)
29	MF	GER	Tobias Jänicke (from Hansa Rostock)
31	FW	CRO	Petar Slišković (on loan from FSV Mainz 05)
35	GK	GER	Florian Fromlowitz (from MSV Duisburg)
38	MF	GER	Tobias Müller (from Dynamo Dresden youth)
39	FW	FRA	Lynel Kitambala (from Saint-Étienne)

Out:

No.	Pos.	Nation	Player
1	GK	GER	Dennis Eilhoff (released)
3	DF	GER	Alexander Schnetzler (to SC Pfullendorf)
7	MF	GER	Marcel Heller (to Alemannia Aachen)
11	MF	GER	Gerrit Müller (to 1. FC Heidenheim)
14	MF	GER	Maik Kegel (to Chemnitzer FC)
16	DF	GER	Martin Stoll (to Karlsruher SC)
18	MF	AUT	Clemens Walch (loan return to 1. FC Kaiserslautern)
20	MF	GER	Marvin Knoll (loan return to Hertha BSC)
22	FW	SLO	Zlatko Dedic (loan return to VfL Bochum)
30	GK	GER	Wolfgang Hesl (to SpVgg Greuther Fürth)
33	DF	GER	Jens Möckel (to Rot-Weiss Erfurt)
38	MF	GER	Sascha Pfeffer (to Chemnitzer FC)

=== Winter ===
In:

No.	Pos.	Nation	Player
18	MF	GER	Tobias Kempe (from SC Paderborn 07)
23	MF	GER	Denis Streker (on loan from 1899 Hoffenheim)
30	FW	BLR	Dmitri Khlebosolov (on loan from Spartak Moscow)

Out:

No.	Pos.	Nation	Player
14	MF	MNE	Hasan Pepic (to Juventus)
20	DF	TUR	Cüneyt Köz (on loan to Preußen Münster)
31	FW	CRO	Petar Slišković (loan return to FSV Mainz 05)
37	DF	GER	Toni Leistner (on loan to Hallescher FC)
