= Sonntag =

Sonntag is the German name of Sunday. Sonntag may also refer to:

== People ==
- Brian Sonntag (born 1951), American politician from Washington
- Brunhilde Sonntag (1936–2002), German composer, musicologist, teacher
- Eliška Sonntagová (born 2001), Czech footballer
- Ernst Sonntag, West German slalom canoeist
- Fredrik Sonntag (born 1987), Swedish ice hockey player
- Kurt L. Sonntag (born c. 1964), American army general
- Maynard Sonntag, Canadian politician from Saskatchewan
- Patrick Sonntag (born 1989), German footballer
- Robert M. Sonntag, pen name for Martin Schäuble (born 1978), German writer
- Roselore Sonntag (1934–2025), German gymnast and coach
- Steven Sonntag, American dancer
- William Louis Sonntag, Sr. (1822–1900), American landscape painter

== Music ==
- "Sonntag", song presented by Austria in the Eurovision Song Contest 1982

== Locations ==
- Sonntag, Austria, municipality in Vorarlberg, Austria
- Sonntag Nunatak, glacial island (nunatak) in the Thief Mountains of Antarctica

== See also ==
- Sontag
- Der Sonntag (Baden newspaper)
