= Hasan Pepić =

Montenegrin footballer (born 1993)

Personal information
- Date of birth: 16 March 1993 (age 33)
- Place of birth: Podgorica, Montenegro, FR Yugoslavia
- Height: 1.83 m (6 ft 0 in)
- Position: Left winger

Team information
- Current team: Bahlinger SC
- Number: 27

Youth career
- SF Rammringen
- –2004: SSV Ulm 1846
- 2004–2009: SSV Reutlingen
- 2009–2011: VfB Stuttgart

Senior career*
Years	Team	Apps	(Gls)
2011–2012	Karlsruher SC II	4	(0)
2012–2013	Dynamo Dresden II	6	(4)
2012–2013	Dynamo Dresden	4	(0)
2013	Juventus Primavera	3	(0)
2013–2014	SSV Reutlingen	24	(1)
2014–2015	SC Paderborn 07 II	25	(7)
2015–2016	Hessen Kassel	31	(1)
2016–2017	Berliner AK 07	27	(5)
2018	Germania Halberstadt	13	(7)
2018–2019	VSG Altglienicke	17	(2)
2019–	Bahlinger SC	243	(31)

International career
2010–2012	Montenegro U-19	9	(0)
- * Club domestic league appearances and goals as of 27 September 2026

Hasan Pepić (Albanian: Hasan Pepaj; born 16 March 1993 in Podgorica) is a Montenegrin footballer who plays as a left-winger for Bahlinger SC.

== Club career ==
Pepić moved to Germany at a young age, and played youth football for a number of clubs in Baden-Württemberg before signing for Dynamo Dresden in July 2012. He made his debut for the club in the first game of the 2012–13 2. Bundesliga season, as a substitute for Filip Trojan in a 2–1 defeat to VfL Bochum. After six months with Dynamo, he signed for Juventus. In August 2013 he returned to Germany to sign for SSV Reutlingen.
