= Sontag =

Sontag is a surname. Notable people with the surname include:

- Alan Sontag (born 1946), American bridge player and author
- Andrzej Sontag (born 1952), Polish triple jumper
- Brett Sontag (born 1970), American racecar driver
- Eduardo Daniel Sontag (born 1951), American/Argentine mathematician
- Frank Sontag (born 1955), American talk radio show host
- Frederick Sontag (1924–2009) American author and educator
- George Contant Sontag (1864–unknown), American outlaw
- Henriette Sontag (1806–1854), German operatic soprano
- John Sontag (1861–1893), American outlaw
- Lina Sontag (born 2003), German basketball player
- Susan Sontag (1933–2004), American essayist, novelist, filmmaker, and activist
- Tiga Sontag (born 1974), Canadian DJ/producer
- Tony Sontag (1956–2018), English darts player

== See also ==
- Phillipa Sontag (Arclight), a mutant character in Marvel Comics
- Sontag, Mississippi, community in north west Lawrence County, Mississippi
- Sonntag (disambiguation)
