= Jonas Marz =

German footballer

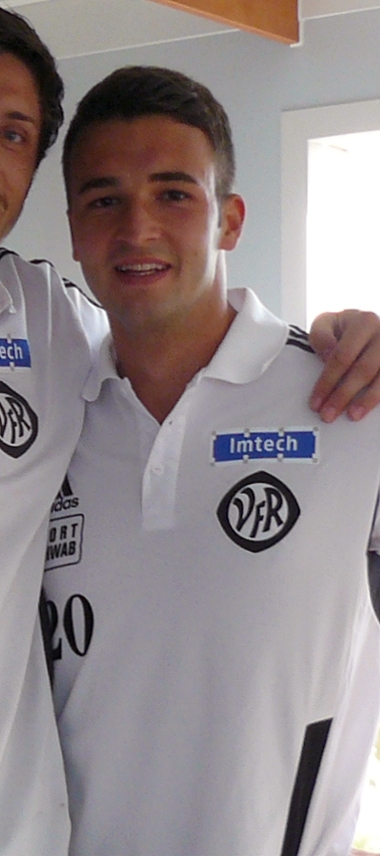
- Jonas Marz

Personal information
- Date of birth: 13 May 1989 (age 37)
- Place of birth: Speyer, West Germany
- Position: Attacking midfielder

Team information
- Current team: KSV Hessen Kassel
- Number: 21

Youth career
- FV Heiligenstein
- –2006: 1. FC Kaiserslautern
- 2006–2008: 1899 Hoffenheim

Senior career*
Years	Team	Apps	(Gls)
2008–2009	1860 Munich II	7	(0)
2009–2011	1. FC Kaiserslautern II	53	(1)
2011–2012	VfR Aalen	11	(0)
2012–	KSV Hessen Kassel	13	(0)
- * Club domestic league appearances and goals as of December 10, 2012

Jonas Marz (born 13 May 1989) is a German footballer who plays for KSV Hessen Kassel.
