= Christoph Sauter =

German footballer

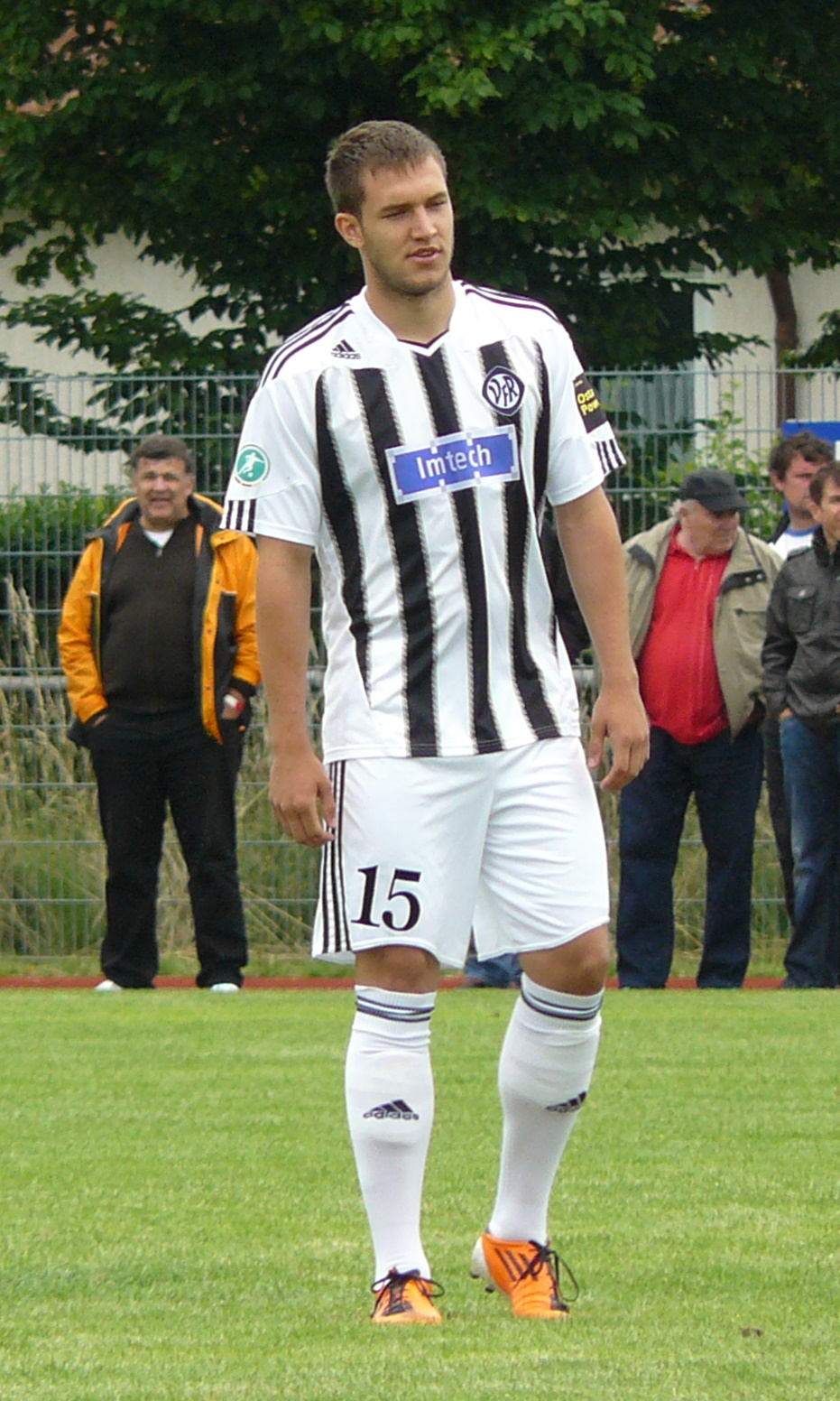
- Sauter playing for VfR Aalen

Personal information
- Date of birth: 3 August 1991 (age 35)
- Place of birth: Ludwigshafen, Germany
- Height: 1.89 m (6 ft 2 in)
- Position: Striker

Youth career
- –2004: VfR Friesenheim
- 2004–2007: Waldhof Mannheim
- 2007–2009: Mainz 05

Senior career*
Years	Team	Apps	(Gls)
2009–2010	Mainz 05 II	4	(1)
2010–2011	1. FC Nürnberg II	28	(8)
2010–2012	1. FC Nürnberg	0	(0)
2011–2012	→ VfR Aalen (loan)	27	(3)
2012–2013	Karlsruher SC	2	(0)
2013	→ Wormatia Worms (loan)	7	(2)
2013–2014	Rot-Weiss Essen	10	(0)
2014–2015	Arminia Ludwigshafen	16	(2)
Total		94	(16)

International career
2009–2010	Germany U-19	8	(1)
- * Club domestic league appearances and goals

Christoph Sauter (born 3 August 1991) is a German former professional footballer who played as a striker.
