= Tobias Müller (footballer, born 1993) =

German footballer

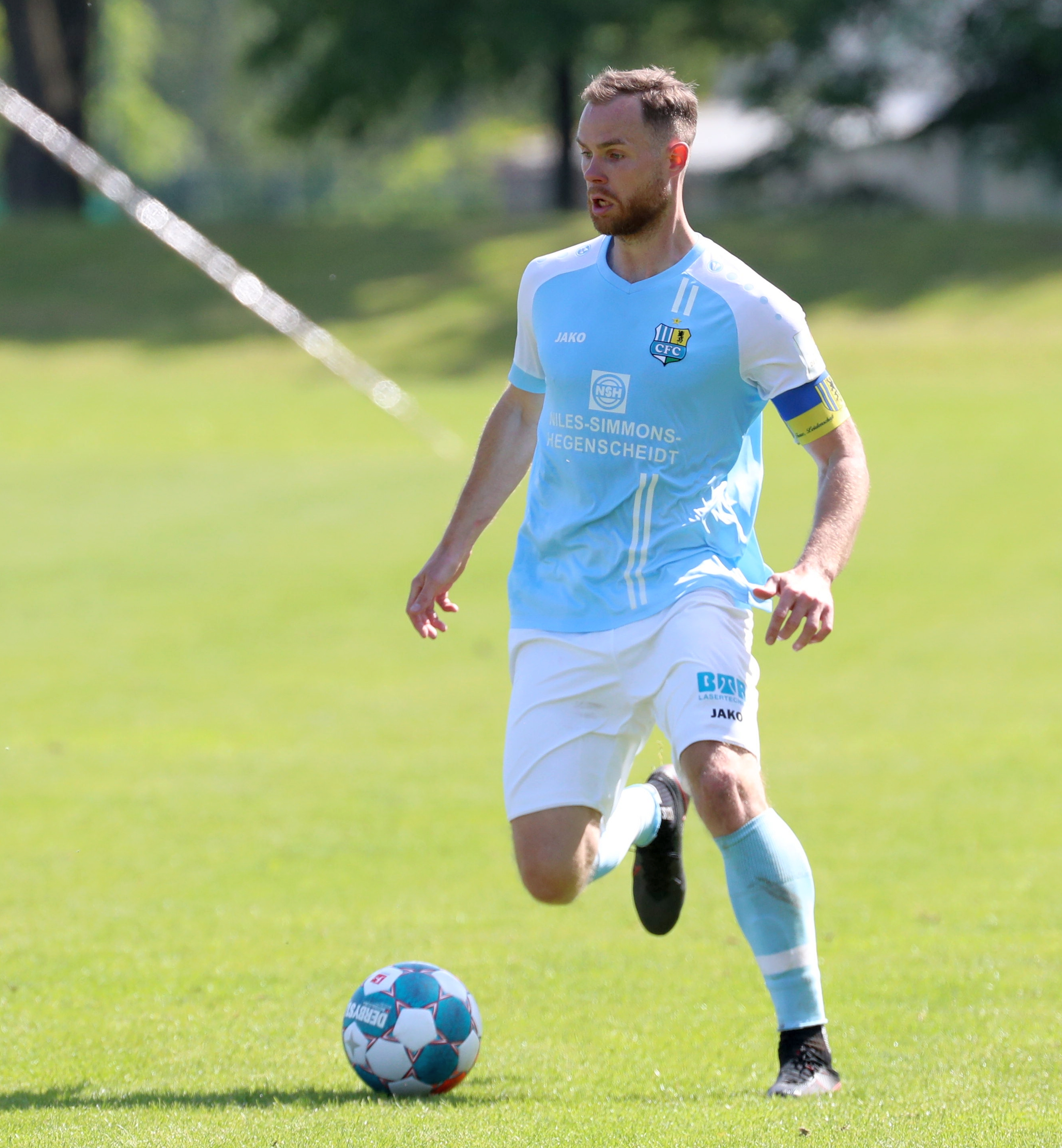

Personal information
- Date of birth: 31 May 1993 (age 33)
- Place of birth: Königshain, Germany
- Height: 1.80 m (5 ft 11 in)
- Positions: Midfielder; forward

Team information
- Current team: Chemnitzer FC
- Number: 38

Youth career
- –2010: SC Borea Dresden
- 2010–2012: Dynamo Dresden

Senior career*
Years	Team	Apps	(Gls)
2012–2015	Dynamo Dresden II	14	(7)
2012–2015	Dynamo Dresden	38	(5)
2015–2017	Hallescher FC	37	(2)
2017–2018	Viktoria Köln	15	(1)
2018–	Chemnitzer FC	177	(22)
- * Club domestic league appearances and goals as of 22 June 2026

Tobias Müller (born 31 May 1993) is a German footballer who plays as a midfielder for Chemnitzer FC.

== Career ==
Müller joined Dynamo Dresden's youth setup from SC Borea Dresden in 2010, and was promoted to the first team two years later. He made his debut on the professional league level in the 2. Bundesliga on 1 February 2013 when he started in a match against MSV Duisburg. In his second appearance for Dynamo he came on as a substitute for Lynel Kitambala and scored twice a 3–1 victory over SV Sandhausen which ended a run of seven games without a win for the club.
