= Der Sonntag (Baden newspaper) =

Weekly newspaper in Baden, Germany

Der Sonntag is a free periodical published on Sunday in the south Baden with a circulation of approximately 330,000.

Five different editions are published: one for the region of Freiburg im Breisgau, one each for the district of Emmendingen ("north Breisgau") and Lörrach, one for the Markgräferland region as well as one for Bad Säckingen and its surrounding area ("Upper Rhine"). The newspaper, which has been published weekly since 1997, focuses on politics, economy, culture, food, leisure and sport. There are also national topics covering pop, lifestyle, cinema and technology. Its publishing house belongs to the Badisches Pressehaus GmbH & Co. KG, a holding company belonging to Badische Zeitung.

The editorial offices can be found in Freiburg, Lörrach, Bad Säckingen and Müllheim.

In 2013, the publisher of the Badische Zeitung awarded the newspaper the Ralf-Dahrendorf-Preis for local journalism. Wolfgang Messner from the Stuttgarter Zeitung and Daniel Gräber from Der Sonntag shared third prize, both having reported on the dubious privatization of the Hochrhein-Eggberg-Klinik in Bad Säckingen. The combination of two different media from two different publishers was also honored.
