= Lynel Kitambala =

French footballer (born 1988)

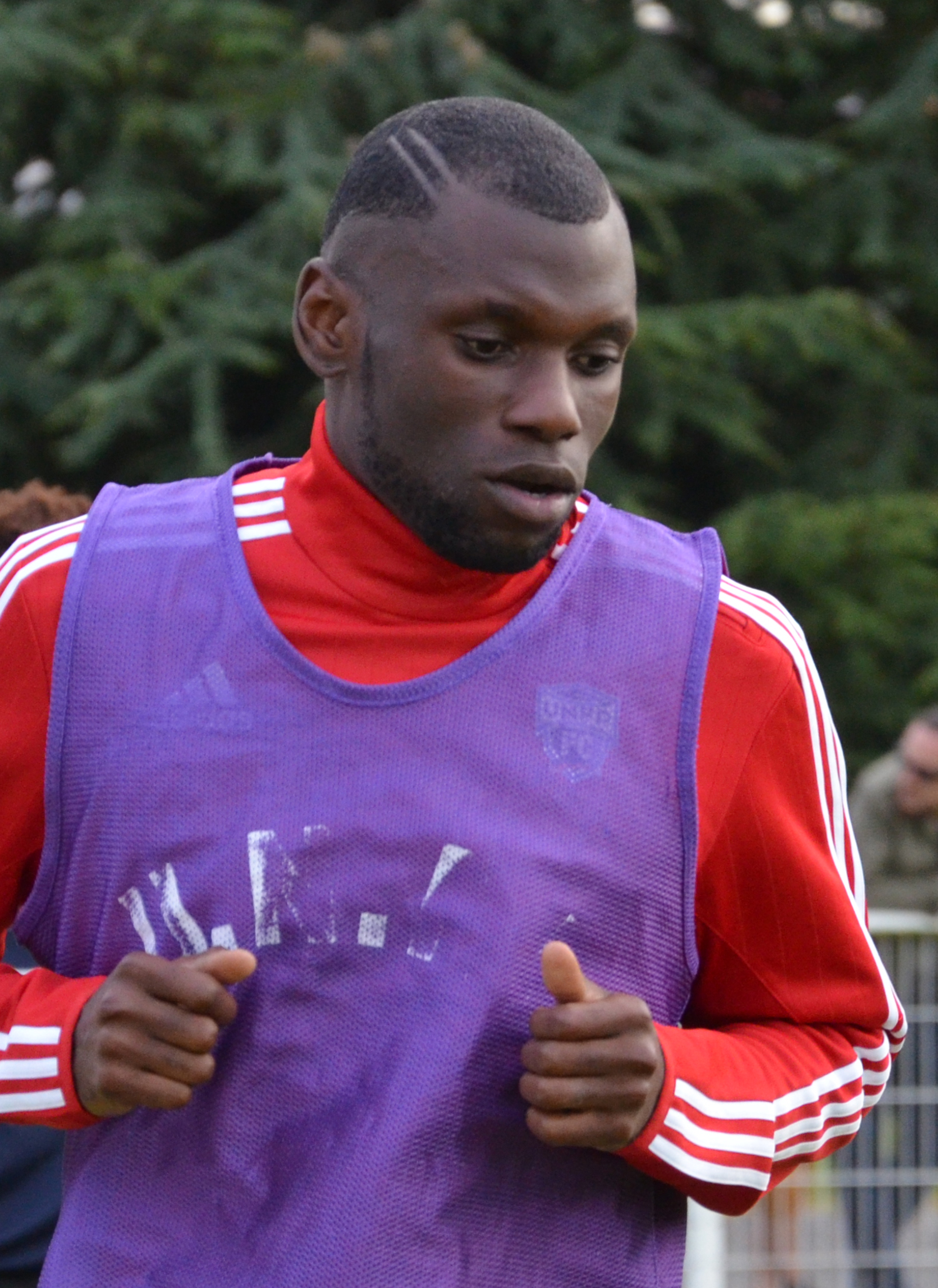
- Kitambala in 2016

Personal information
- Full name: Lynel Darcy Kitambala
- Date of birth: 26 October 1988 (age 38)
- Place of birth: Creil, France
- Height: 1.78 m (5 ft 10 in)
- Position: Winger

Team information
- Current team: Saint-Pierroise

Youth career
- 1999–2000: US Thiverny
- 2000–2002: FC Creil
- 2002–2003: US Pont Sainte-Maxence
- 2003–2004: Clairefontaine
- 2004–2008: Auxerre

Senior career*
Years	Team	Apps	(Gls)
2008–2010	Auxerre	8	(0)
2009–2010	→ Dijon (loan)	34	(13)
2010–2011	Lorient	31	(6)
2011–2014	Saint-Étienne	16	(0)
2012–2013	→ Dynamo Dresden (loan)	17	(2)
2013–2014	→ Auxerre (loan)	29	(2)
2014–2015	Sporting Charleroi	29	(5)
2015	Levski Sofia	7	(0)
2015–2016	Union SG	8	(2)
2017–2018	Apollon Smyrnis	3	(0)
2018	Senica	8	(5)
2019	Farense	7	(1)
2019–	Saint-Pierroise		

International career
2010	France U20	5	(4)
2009–2010	France U21	4	(1)
- * Club domestic league appearances and goals as of 21:39, 3 June 2019 (UTC)

Lynel Darcy Kitambala (born 26 October 1988) is a French footballer who currently plays as a winger for French club JS Saint-Pierroise.

== Personal life ==
Kitambala was born in Creil, France. He holds both French and DR Congolese nationalities.

== Career ==
After playing for four other youth clubs in France, Kitambala finished his formation with Auxerre. After he was named on the bench for Auxerre's six games during 2007–08 season, he made his first team debut in a 0–0 home draw against Valenciennes on 1 November 2008, coming on as a substitute for Dennis Oliech.

In July 2009, Kitambala joined Ligue 2 club Dijon on a season-long loan deal.

On 20 August 2010, Kitambala signed a contract with Lorient, for an undisclosed fee thought to be in the region of €1.5 million. He made his debut at Stade du Moustoir on 28 August, and scored the second goal in a 2–0 win over Lyon. On 25 September, Kitambala scored a goal in the 89th minute against Monaco, securing a 2–1 victory for Lorient. He ended the season with 8 goals in all competitions.

On 31 August 2011, Kitambala signed with Saint-Étienne for a reported fee of €2.5 million. He made his debut for the club on 10 September, in a 3–1 home loss against Lille, coming on as an 85th-minute substitute for Laurent Batlles. He made only nine league starts throughout the season, in contrast to 24 starts he made in the previous season while at Lorient. In an attempt to earn some playing time, Kitambala spent the 2012–13 season on loan in the German 2. Bundesliga, where he played for Dynamo Dresden.

On 14 September 2015, Kitambala signed a two-year contract with Bulgarian side Levski Sofia.

In February 2019, he moved to Farense.

== Career statistics ==
As of match played 16 December 2017

Appearances and goals by club, season and competition
Club	Season	League			National Cup		League Cup		Other		Total	
Club	Season	Division	Apps	Goals	Apps	Goals	Apps	Goals	Apps	Goals	Apps	Goals
Auxerre	2008–09	Ligue 1	8	0	0	0	0	0	—		8	0
Dijon (loan)	2009–10	Ligue 2	34	13	0	0	2	1	—		36	14
Auxerre II	2010–11	CFA	1	1	—		—		—		1	1
Lorient	2010–11	Ligue 1	27	6	4	1	2	1	—		33	8
Lorient	2011–12	Ligue 1	4	0	0	0	1	0	—		5	0
Lorient	Total		31	6	4	1	3	1	0	0	38	8
Lorient II	2010–11	CFA	2	0	—		—		—		2	0
Saint-Étienne	2011–12	Ligue 1	16	0	0	0	1	0	—		17	0
Saint-Étienne II	2011–12	CFA	5	1	—		—		—		5	1
Saint-Étienne II	2012–13	CFA	1	0	—		—		—		1	0
Saint-Étienne II	Total		6	1	—		—		—		6	1
Dynamo Dresden (loan)	2012–13	2. Bundesliga	17	2	1	0	—		—		18	2
Auxerre (loan)	2013–14	Ligue 2	29	2	3	2	2	0	—		34	4
Auxerre II (loan)	2013–14	CFA	2	1	—		—		—		2	1
Sporting Charleroi	2014–15	Pro League	28	5	4	0	—		—		32	5
Levski Sofia	2015–16	A Group	7	0	2	0	—		—		9	0
Union SG	2015–16	Second Division	8	2	0	0	—		—		8	2
Apollon Smyrnis	2017–18	Super League Greece	11	0	1	1	—		—		12	1
Career total			200	33	15	4	8	2	0	0	223	39
