= Bjarne Thoelke =

German footballer (born 1992)

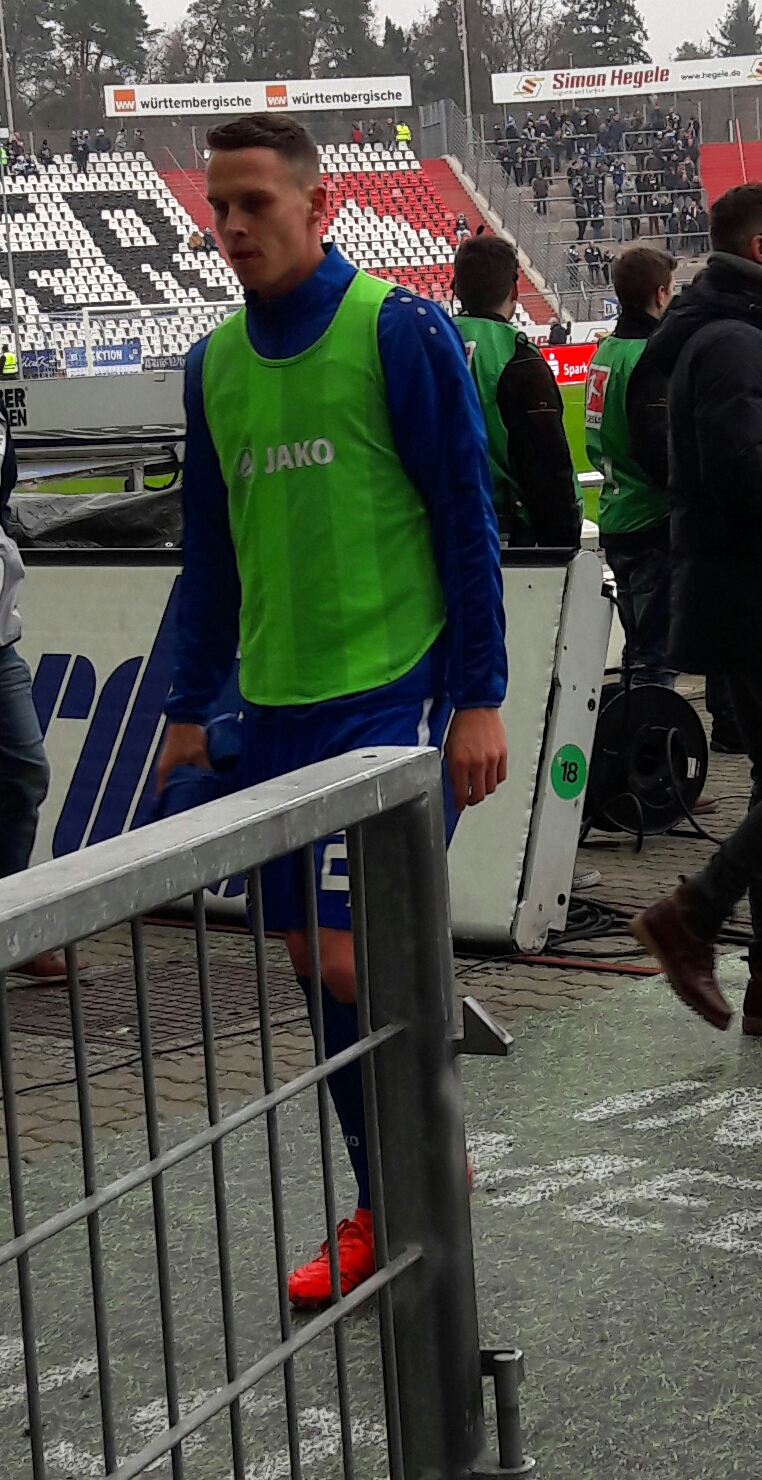
- Thoelke in 2016

Personal information
- Date of birth: 11 April 1992 (age 34)
- Place of birth: Gifhorn, Germany
- Height: 1.90 m (6 ft 3 in)
- Position: Centre back

Team information
- Current team: Eintracht Braunschweig II
- Number: 14

Youth career
- 1996–2005: VfL Wahrenholz
- 2005–2011: VfL Wolfsburg

Senior career*
Years	Team	Apps	(Gls)
2010–2015	VfL Wolfsburg II	32	(2)
2011–2015	VfL Wolfsburg	6	(0)
2012–2014	→ Dynamo Dresden (loan)	5	(0)
2015–2017	Karlsruher SC	33	(1)
2017–2018	Hamburger SV	0	(0)
2018–2020	Admira Wacker	19	(0)
2021	1. FC Saarbrücken	2	(0)
2022–2025	1. FC Saarbrücken	58	(2)
2025–	Eintracht Braunschweig II	1	(0)

International career
2009–2010	Germany U18	1	(0)
2010–2011	Germany U19	2	(0)
2011	Germany U20	1	(0)
- * Club domestic league appearances and goals as of 7 November 2025

Bjarne Thoelke (born 11 April 1992) is a German professional footballer who plays as a centre back for Eintracht Braunschweig II in Oberliga Niedersachsen.

== Club career ==
On 18 June 2012, it was announced that Thoelke went on a two-year loan deal to Dynamo Dresden until June 2014.

On 2 June 2015, Karlsruher SC announced their signing of Thoelke on a two-year contract. In June 2017, after his contract with Karlsruhe had expired, he signed for Bundesliga side Hamburger SV for a year.

In January 2021, after trialling with 1. FC Saarbrücken, Thoelke joined the 3. Liga club. He left the club as a free agent at the end of the 2020–21 season.

On 28 January 2022, 1. FC Saarbrücken signed Thoelke once again.

== Career statistics ==
As of match played 21 October 2017

Appearances and goals by club, season and competition
Club	Season	League			National Cup		Continental		Total	
Club	Season	Division	Apps	Goals	Apps	Goals	Apps	Goals	Apps	Goals
VfL Wolfsburg II	2010–11	Regionalliga Nord	12	1	—		—		12	1
VfL Wolfsburg II	2011–12	Regionalliga Nord	19	1	—		—		19	1
VfL Wolfsburg II	2014–15	Regionalliga Nord	19	2	—		—		19	2
VfL Wolfsburg II	Total		50	4	—		—		50	4
VfL Wolfsburg	2011–12	Bundesliga	6	0	0	0	—		6	0
Dynamo Dresden (loan)	2012–13	2. Bundesliga	5	0	1	0	—		6	0
Karlsruher SC	2015–16	2. Bundesliga	12	0	1	0	—		13	0
Karlsruher SC	2016–17	2. Bundesliga	21	1	0	0	—		21	1
Karlsruher SC	Total		33	1	1	0	–		34	1
Hamburger SV	2017–18	Bundesliga	0	0	0	0	—		0	0
Career total			94	5	2	0	0	0	96	5
