= Cüneyt Köz =

German footballer

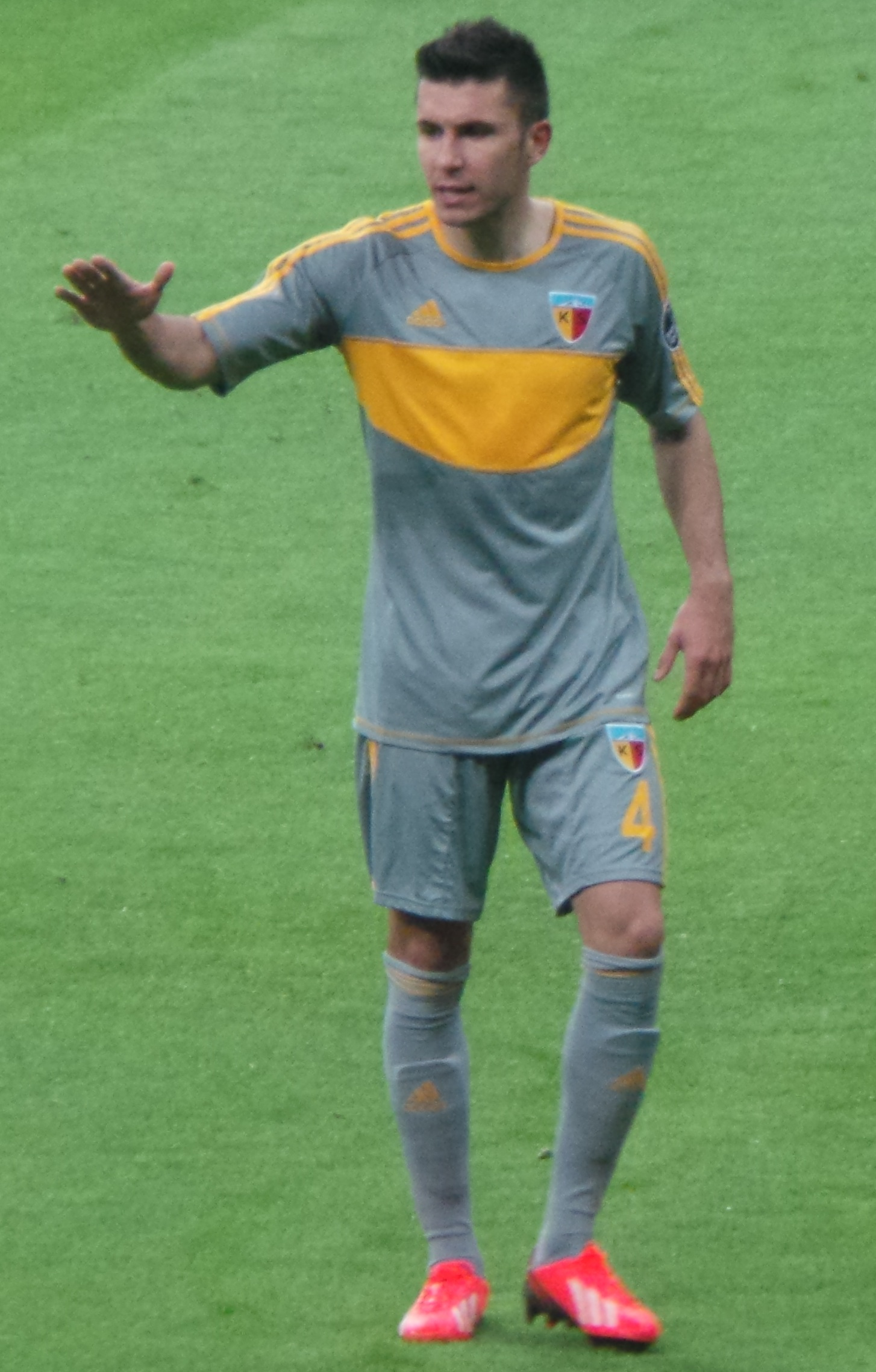
- Köz playing for Kayserispor in 2014

Personal information
- Date of birth: 12 October 1992 (age 34)
- Place of birth: Kösching, Germany
- Height: 1.80 m (5 ft 11 in)
- Position: Defender

Youth career
- –2010: FC Bayern Munich

Senior career*
Years	Team	Apps	(Gls)
2010–2012	FC Bayern Munich II	41	(3)
2012–2013	Dynamo Dresden	0	(0)
2013	→ Preußen Münster (loan)	7	(0)
2013–2016	Kayserispor	13	(0)
2016–2019	Balıkesirspor	77	(1)
2019–2021	Bursaspor	33	(2)
2022	Bandırmaspor	7	(0)
- * Club domestic league appearances and goals as of 20 May 2022

Cüneyt Köz (born 12 October 1992) is a German footballer.

== Career ==
Köz is a product of Bayern Munich's youth setup, and made his debut for their reserve team in a 3. Liga match against Kickers Offenbach in May 2010, coming on as a substitute for Saër Sène. He made nine appearances the following season, including all five at the end of the season after Rainer Ulrich was appointed as interim manager, and was a regular fixture in the first-team's pre-season friendlies in summer 2011. After 31 appearances in the 2011–12 season he signed for Dynamo Dresden in summer 2012. Six months later he signed for Preußen Münster on a half-season loan.
