= Leandro Grech =

Argentine footballer

Leandro
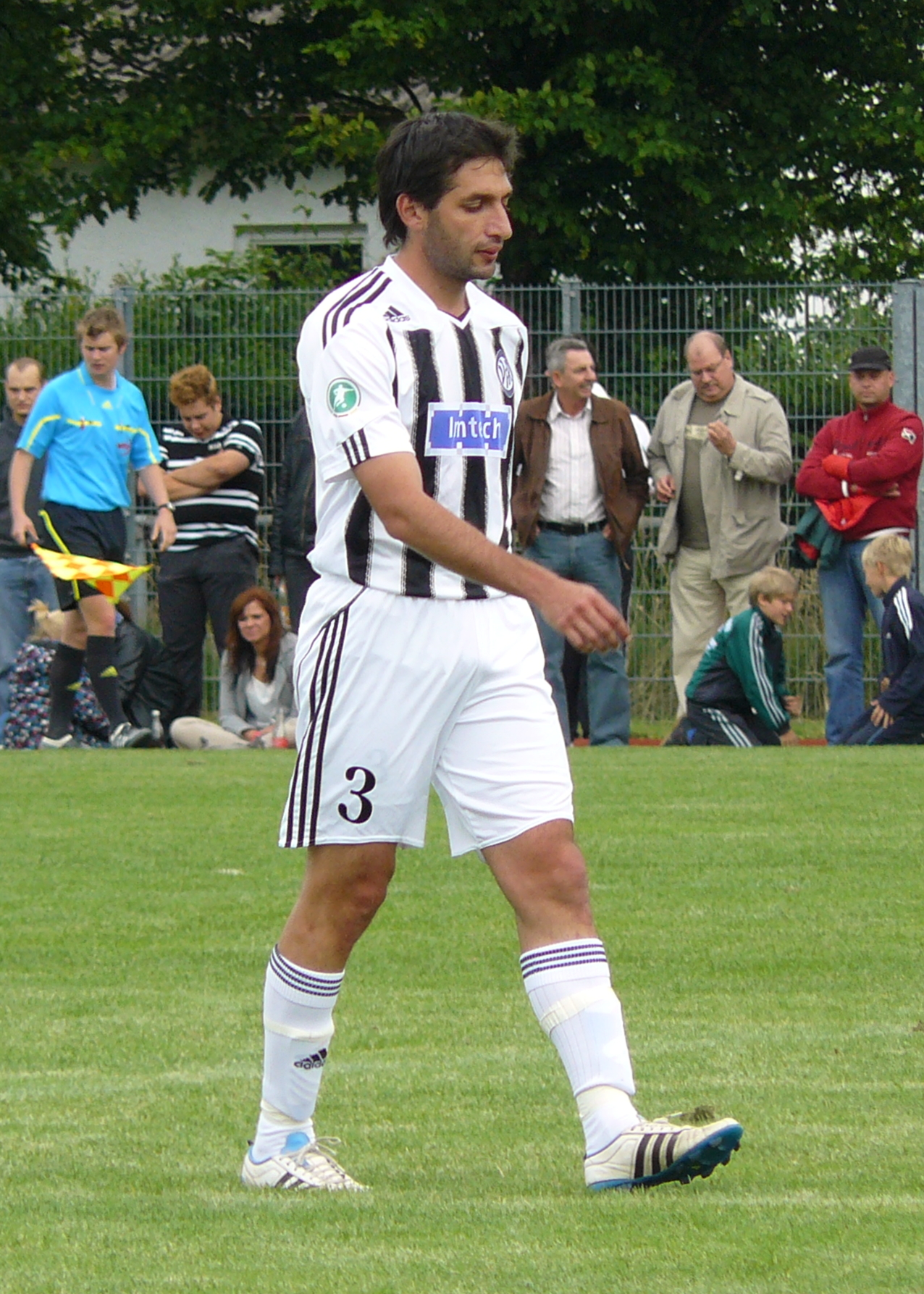
- Grech playing for VfR Aalen in 2011.

Personal information
- Full name: Leandro Grech
- Date of birth: 24 October 1980 (age 46)
- Place of birth: Rosario, Santa Fe, Argentina
- Height: 1.81 m (5 ft 11 in)
- Position: Midfielder

Senior career*
Years	Team	Apps	(Gls)
1998–1999	Argentino de Rosario	4	(0)
2000–2003	Newell's Old Boys	24	(0)
2003–2004	Colo-Colo		
2004–2005	Aurora	44	(0)
2005	Aldosivi	15	(0)
2006	San Martín de Mendoza	7	(0)
2006–2007	SC Pfullendorf	50	(6)
2008	Erzgebirge Aue	10	(1)
2008–2009	Sandhausen	35	(4)
2009–2011	SpVgg Unterhaching	68	(4)
2011–2015	VfR Aalen	141	(8)
2015–2019	SV Elversberg	124	(6)
- * Club domestic league appearances and goals as of 17:42, 21 July 2019 (UTC)

Leandro Grech (born 24 October 1980) is an Argentine footballer who most recently played for German side SV Elversberg.
