= Patrick Sonntag =

German footballer

Personal information
- Date of birth: 29 June 1989 (age 37)
- Place of birth: Germany
- Height: 1.83 m (6 ft 0 in)
- Position: Forward

Senior career*
Years	Team	Apps	(Gls)
2008–2010	Erzgebirge Aue II		
2009–2012	Erzgebirge Aue	5	(0)
2012–2013	Sportfreunde Siegen	6	(0)
2013–2014	VfB Auerbach	19	(0)
Total		30	(0)
- * Club domestic league appearances and goals

Patrick Sonntag (born 29 June 1989) is a German former professional footballer who played as a forward.
