= Idir Ouali =

French footballer (born 1988)

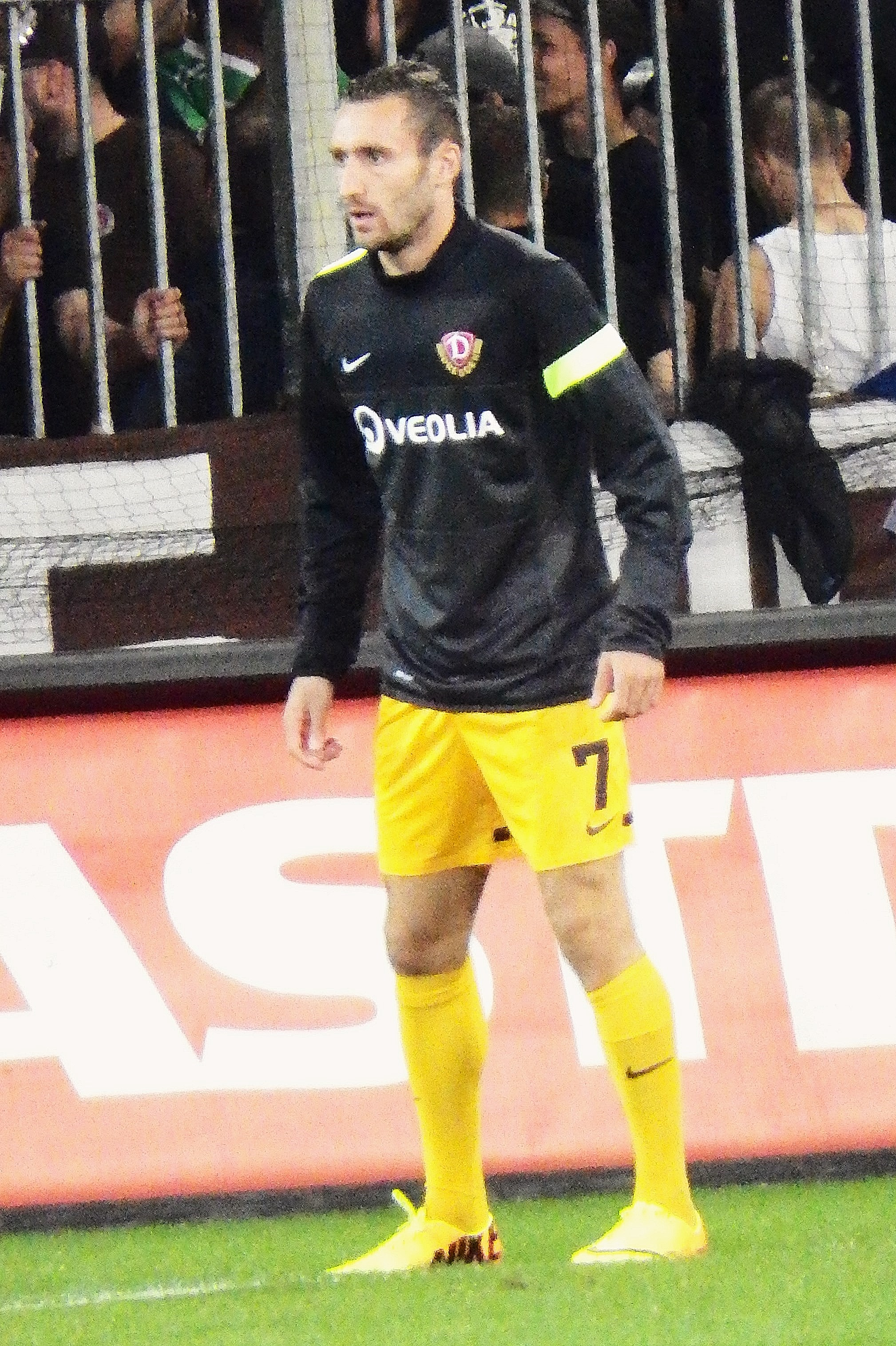
- Ouali with Dynamo Dresden in 2013

Personal information
- Date of birth: 21 May 1988 (age 38)
- Place of birth: Roubaix, France
- Height: 1.76 m (5 ft 9 in)
- Position: Midfielder

Team information
- Current team: Olympic Charleroi
- Number: 59

Youth career
- 2001–2005: SCO Roubaix 59
- 2005–2007: Mouscron

Senior career*
Years	Team	Apps	(Gls)
2007–2009	Mouscron	56	(11)
2010–2012	Le Mans	64	(11)
2010–2012	→ Le Mans B	5	(1)
2012–2014	Dynamo Dresden	64	(8)
2014–2016	SC Paderborn	19	(0)
2016–2019	Kortrijk	64	(10)
2019–2020	Hatayspor	26	(1)
2021	Ethnikos Achna	19	(3)
2022	Bahla Club		
2022–	Olympic Charleroi	25	(5)
- * Club domestic league appearances and goals as of 16 August 2023

Idir Ouali (born 21 May 1988) is a French professional footballer who plays as a midfielder for Belgian club Olympic Charleroi.

== Club career ==
Ouali began his career in the junior ranks of amateur club SCO Roubaix 59 in his native Roubaix. At age 15, his math teacher at the time recommended that he try out for Mouscron's academy, Futurosport, which was a short distance away across the Belgian border. Ouali took his advice and was admitted into the club shortly after.

=== Mouscron ===
Ouali progressed through the junior ranks of RE Mouscron, and on 27 January 2007 he made his professional debut for the club in a league game against Gent.

On 8 March 2008, Ouali started his first league game for the club against Brugge, scoring a goal in the 2–0 win. The following week, he started and scored again, this time against Charleroi. After scoring two goals in his first 2 starts for Mouscron, he was signed on 16 March 2008 to a two-year contract extension until 2010. On 14 September 2008, Ouali scored a hat-trick in a league game against Kortrijk.

On 22 December 2008, it was reported that Ouali was joining Standard Liège for a fee of €400,000. However, the transfer did not go through because of Mouscron's refusal to sell after the news of the transfer was leaked to the press before its completion.

On 28 December 2009, Mouscron were kicked out of the Belgian First Division and relegated to the Third Division after facing financial difficulties and going into administration. All the first team players of the club became free agents and were free to sign with other clubs. On 1 January 2010, Ouali went on trial with Ligue 1 side FC Sochaux. However, on 7 January 2010, it was reported that Ouali was close to signing with another Ligue 1 side, Le Mans.

=== Le Mans ===
On 8 January 2010, Ouali signed a two-and-a-half-year contract with Le Mans FC.

=== Dynamo Dresden ===
On 24 July 2012, Ouali signed a two-year contract with Dynamo Dresden. Despite the club's on-field struggles, finishing 16th and 17th in Ouali's two years at the club, he enjoyed a successful spell and reached good form. His pace caused problems for opposition defences as he established himself as an important first-team player.

=== SC Paderborn ===
Following Dynamo Dresden's relegation from the 2. Bundesliga in the 2013–14 season, Ouali signed a three-year contract with SC Paderborn 07, and represented them in the Bundesliga for the 2014–15 season. Paderborn were relegated to the 2. Bundesliga for the 2015–16 season.

=== Kortrijk ===
On 15 June 2016, Ouali joined Belgian club Kortrijk.

=== Hatayspor ===
On 5 August 2019, Ouali signed a contract with Turkish club Hatayspor.

=== Return to Belgium ===
In September 2022, Ouali returned to Belgium and signed with the third-tier Belgian National Division 1 club Olympic Charleroi.

== International career ==
In May 2013, Ouali was selected by Algeria national team coach Vahid Halilhodžić as a reserve player for a pair of 2014 World Cup qualifiers against Benin and Rwanda.

== Career statistics ==
As of match played on 24 May 2019

Appearances and goals by club, season and competition
Club	Season	League			Cup		Other		Total	
Club	Season	Division	Apps	Goals	Apps	Goals	Apps	Goals	Apps	Goals
Excelsior Mouscron	2006–07	Belgian First Division	1	0	0	0	0	0	1	0
Excelsior Mouscron	2007–08	Belgian First Division	9	5	0	0	0	0	9	5
Excelsior Mouscron	2008–09	Belgian First Division	32	6	0	0	0	0	32	6
Excelsior Mouscron	2009–10	Belgian Pro League	14	0	0	0	0	0	14	0
Excelsior Mouscron	Total		56	11	0	0	0	0	56	11
Le Mans	2009–10	Ligue 1	10	1	1	0	0	0	11	1
Le Mans	2010–11	Ligue 2	19	1	5	2	0	0	24	3
Le Mans	2011–12	Ligue 2	35	9	5	0	0	0	40	9
Le Mans	Total		64	11	11	2	0	0	75	13
Le Mans B	2010–11	CFA	5	1	—				5	1
Dynamo Dresden	2012–13	2. Bundesliga	32	5	2	0	2 (Note: Appearances in Relegation play-offs)	1	36	6
Dynamo Dresden	2013–14	2. Bundesliga	32	3	0	0	0	0	32	3
Dynamo Dresden	Total		64	8	2	0	2	1	68	9
SC Paderborn	2014–15	Bundesliga	6	0	1	0	0	0	7	0
SC Paderborn	2015–16	2. Bundesliga	13	0	1	0	0	0	14	0
SC Paderborn	Total		19	0	2	0	0	0	21	0
Kortrijk	2016–17	Belgian First Division A	24	3	2	0	9 (Note: Appearances in Europa League play-offs)	0	35	3
Kortrijk	2017–18	Belgian First Division A	20	4	5	3	8 (Note: Appearances in Europa League play-offs)	2	33	9
Kortrijk	2018–19	Belgian First Division A	20	3	1	0	2 (Note: Appearances in Europa League play-offs)	0	23	3
Kortrijk	Total		64	10	8	3	19	2	91	15
Career totals			272	41	23	5	21	3	316	49
