= Filip Trojan =

Czech retired footballer (born 1983)

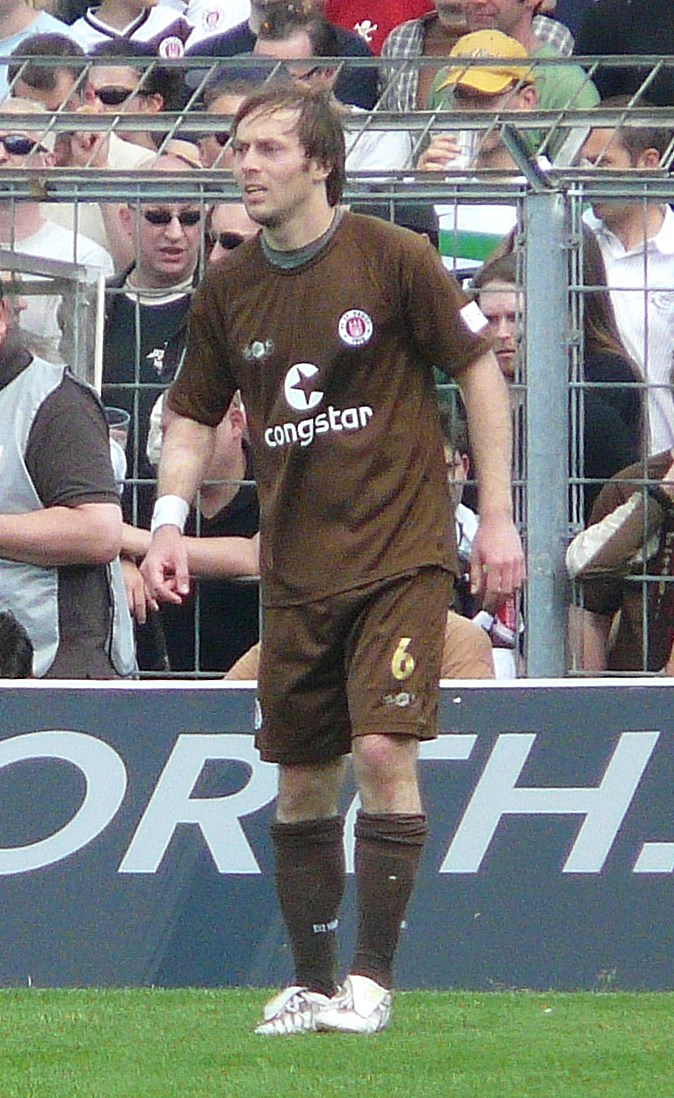
- Trojan with FC St. Pauli in 2008

Personal information
- Full name: Filip Trojan
- Date of birth: 21 February 1983 (age 43)
- Place of birth: Třebíč, Czechoslovakia
- Height: 1.72 m (5 ft 8 in)
- Position: Midfielder

Youth career
- 1994–1996: Slavia Třebíč
- 1996–1999: Slavia Prague
- 1999–2001: Schalke 04

Senior career*
Years	Team	Apps	(Gls)
1999–2004	Schalke 04	11	(0)
2003–2004	Schalke 04 II	10	(3)
2004–2007	VfL Bochum	67	(1)
2007–2009	FC St. Pauli	35	(8)
2009–2011	Mainz 05	5	(0)
2009–2011	Mainz 05 II	4	(0)
2010–2011	→ MSV Duisburg (loan)	34	(2)
2011–2014	Dynamo Dresden	66	(3)
Total		232	(17)

International career
2002–2005	Czech Republic U21	19	(3)

Managerial career
- 2016–: Dynamo Dresden (U-14)
- * Club domestic league appearances and goals

Filip Trojan (born 21 February 1983) is a Czech former professional footballer who played as a midfielder. He coaches Dynamo Dresden's U-14 side.

== Club career ==
On 20 March 2009, Trojan signed for the 1. FSV Mainz 05 who had been newly promoted to the Bundesliga.

== International career ==
Trojan represented Czech Republic youth teams.

== Honours ==
Schalke 04

- UEFA Intertoto Cup: 2003
