= 2012–13 2. Bundesliga =

39th season of the second-tier football league in Germany

2. Bundesliga
- Season: 2012–13
- Champions: Hertha BSC
- Promoted: Hertha BSC; Eintracht Braunschweig
- Relegated: MSV Duisburg; Jahn Regensburg
- Matches: 306
- Goals: 790 (2.58 per match)
- Top goalscorer: Dominick Kumbela (19 goals)
- Biggest home win: Erzgebirge Aue 6–1 VfL Bochum
- Biggest away win: SV Sandhausen 1–6 Hertha BSC
- Highest scoring: Erzgebirge Aue 6–1 VfL Bochum; SV Sandhausen 1–6 Hertha BSC; VfL Bochum 5–2 SV Sandhausen; Eintracht Braunschweig 4–3 1. FC Union Berlin
- Average attendance: 17,240

The 2012–13 2. Bundesliga was the 39th season of the 2. Bundesliga, Germany's second-level football league. The season began on 3 August 2012 and ended with the last games on 19 May 2013, with a winter break held between the weekends around 15 December 2012 and 2 February 2013.

The league comprised eighteen teams: The teams placed fourth through fifteenth of the 2011–12 season, the worst two teams from the 2011–12 Bundesliga, the best two teams from the 2011–12 3. Liga, the losers of the relegation play-off between the 16th-placed Bundesliga team and the third-placed 2. Bundesliga team and the winners of the relegation play-off between the 16th-placed 2. Bundesliga team and the third-placed 3. Liga team.

== Teams ==
At the end of the 2011–12 season, SpVgg Greuther Fürth and Eintracht Frankfurt were directly promoted to the 2012–13 Bundesliga. Greuther Fürth left the second level after fifteen seasons and will make debut for top level, while Eintracht only made a cameo appearance in the league. The two promoted teams were replaced by 1. FC Köln and 1. FC Kaiserslautern, who were relegated at the end of the 2011–12 Bundesliga season. Köln re-entered the second level after four consecutive Bundesliga seasons, while Kaiserslautern returned to the 2. Bundesliga after two years.

On the other end of the table, Alemannia Aachen and Hansa Rostock were directly relegated to the 2012–13 3. Liga. Aachen dropped to the third tier for the first time since the 1998–99 season, while Rostock concluded a cameo appearance in the league. The two relegated clubs will be replaced with 2011–12 3. Liga champions SV Sandhausen and runners-up VfR Aalen, who earned direct promotion spots are thus both made their debut on this level of the league system.

Two further spots were available via two-legged play-offs. The playoff between 16th-placed 2011–12 Bundesliga sides Hertha BSC and third-placed 2011–12 2. Bundesliga team Fortuna Düsseldorf ended 4–3 on aggregate for the latter. Consequently, Fortuna finished a three-year spell at second level and returned to the Bundesliga after fifteen years in lower leagues; in turn, Hertha concluded a cameo appearance at the top level and returned to the 2. Bundesliga. However, this decision is provisional since Hertha have appealed the result of the second leg, which was marred by several incidents of crowd disturbance.

Elsewhere, the playoff between 16th-placed 2011–12 2. Bundesliga sides Karlsruher SC and third-placed 2011–12 3. Liga team Jahn Regensburg ended 3–3 on aggregate and saw Jahn promoted via the away goal rule. The Bavarian club returned to the second level after eight years; in turn, Karlsruhe finished a three-year spell at the second level and returned to the third level for the first time since the 2000–01 season.

=== Stadiums and locations ===
Five clubs expanded the seating capacities of their stadiums. Following their promotion, Aalen, Jahn Regensburg and Sandhausen all increased the capacity of their stadiums to 12,500, 13,251 and 12,100 spectators, respectively. Elsewhere, St. Pauli's Millerntor-Stadion was undergoing reconstruction during the autumn as the entire Back Straight was being rebuilt. Finally, 1860 Munich will benefit from an expansion of Allianz Arena by co-tenants and city rivals Bayern Munich, who increased the total capacity of the ground to 71,000 people in late August 2012.

An additional three clubs will have a slightly decreased capacity, as Eintracht Braunschweig, FSV Frankfurt and Union Berlin all are rebuilding a stand of their stadiums. Braunschweig will thus be able to host 22,100 spectators, while Frankfurt and Union can accommodate 10,470 and 16,750 people, respectively, during reconstruction.

Location of teams in the 2012–13 2. Bundesliga

Team	Location	Stadium	Stadium capacity
VfR Aalen	Aalen	Scholz-Arena	13,251
VfL Bochum	Bochum	rewirpowerSTADION	29,299
MSV Duisburg	Duisburg	Schauinsland-Reisen-Arena	31,500
Dynamo Dresden	Dresden	Glücksgas-Stadion	32,066
Eintracht Braunschweig	Braunschweig	Eintracht-Stadion	22,100^{Note 2}
Energie Cottbus	Cottbus	Stadion der Freundschaft	22,528
FC Erzgebirge Aue	Aue	Sparkassen-Erzgebirgsstadion	15,711
FSV Frankfurt	Frankfurt am Main	Frankfurter Volksbank Stadion	10,470^{Note 3}
Hertha BSC	Berlin	Olympiastadion	74,244
FC Ingolstadt 04	Ingolstadt	Audi Sportpark	15,445
Jahn Regensburg	Regensburg	Jahnstadion	12,500
1. FC Kaiserslautern	Kaiserslautern	Fritz-Walter-Stadion	49,780
1. FC Köln	Cologne	RheinEnergieStadion	50,000
1860 Munich	Munich	Allianz Arena	71,000^{Note 1}
SC Paderborn 07	Paderborn	Energieteam Arena	15,000
SV Sandhausen	Sandhausen	Hardtwald	12,100
FC St. Pauli	Hamburg	Millerntor-Stadion	29,063
1. FC Union Berlin	Berlin	Alte Försterei	16,750^{Note 2}

Notes

1. The total capacity of Allianz Arena was 69,000 people before being expanded to 71,000 in late August 2012.
2. Stadium is under reconstruction for all of the 2012–13 season.
3. Stadium is under reconstruction during the 2012–13 season. The capacity will increase to 12,542 spectators upon completion of the works.

=== Personnel and sponsorships ===
Team	Head coach	Team captain	Kitmaker	Shirt sponsor
VfR Aalen	(Austria) Ralph Hasenhüttl	(Argentina) Leandro Grech	adidas	Imtech
VfL Bochum	(Germany) Peter Neururer	(Germany) Andreas Luthe	Nike	Netto
MSV Duisburg	(Germany) Kosta Runjaić	(Bosnia and Herzegovina) Branimir Bajić	Nike	Rheinpower
Dynamo Dresden	(Austria) Peter Pacult	(Germany) Robert Koch	Nike	Veolia
Eintracht Braunschweig	(Germany) Torsten Lieberknecht	(Germany) Dennis Kruppke	Puma	Volkswagen Bank
Energie Cottbus	(Germany) Rudi Bommer	(Germany) Marc-André Kruska	Umbro	Tropical Islands
Erzgebirge Aue	(Germany) Falko Götz	(Germany) René Klingbeil	Nike	Eibenstock Vakuum Technik
FSV Frankfurt	(Germany) Benno Möhlmann	(Germany) Björn Schlicke	Saller	Sparhandy
Hertha BSC	(Netherlands) Jos Luhukay	(Germany) Peter Niemeyer	Nike	Deutsche Bahn
FC Ingolstadt 04	(Germany) Tomas Oral	(Germany) Stefan Leitl	adidas	Audi
Jahn Regensburg	(Poland) Franciszek Smuda	(Germany) André Laurito	Saller	Händlmaier
1. FC Kaiserslautern	(Germany) Franco Foda	(Switzerland) Albert Bunjaku	uhlsport	Allgäuer Latschenkiefer
1. FC Köln	(Germany) Holger Stanislawski	(Slovenia) Mišo Brečko	Erima	REWE
1860 Munich	(Germany) Alexander Schmidt	(Germany) Benjamin Lauth	uhlsport	Aston Martin
SC Paderborn 07	(Germany) René Müller (caretaker)	(Germany) Markus Krösche	Saller	Möbelhaus Finke
SV Sandhausen	(Germany) Hans-Jürgen Boysen	(Germany) Frank Löning	Puma	Direct Line
FC St. Pauli	(Germany) Michael Frontzeck	(Germany) Fabian Boll	Do You Football	Deutsche Fernsehlotterie
1. FC Union Berlin	(Germany) Uwe Neuhaus	(Germany) Torsten Mattuschka	uhlsport	Becker AutoSound

=== Managerial changes ===
Team	Outgoing manager	Manner of departure	Date of vacancy	Position in table	Incoming manager	Date of appointment
1. FC Köln	(Germany) Frank Schaefer	End of tenure as caretaker	30 June 2012	Pre-season	(Germany) Holger Stanislawski	1 July 2012
1. FC Kaiserslautern	(Bulgaria) Krasimir Balakov	Sacked	30 June 2012	Pre-season	(Germany) Franco Foda	1 July 2012
Hertha BSC	(Germany) Otto Rehhagel	End of contract	30 June 2012	Pre-season	(Netherlands) Jos Luhukay	1 July 2012
Jahn Regensburg	(Germany) Markus Weinzierl	FC Augsburg purchased rights	30 June 2012	Pre-season	(Germany) Oscar Corrochano	1 July 2012
SC Paderborn 07	(Germany) Roger Schmidt	FC Red Bull Salzburg purchased rights	30 June 2012	Pre-season	(Germany) Stephan Schmidt	10 July 2012
MSV Duisburg	(Germany) Oliver Reck	Sacked	25 August 2012	18th	(Germany) Kosta Runjaić	3 September 2012
FC St. Pauli	(Germany) André Schubert	Sacked	26 September 2012	13th	(Germany) Michael Frontzeck	3 October 2012
VfL Bochum	(Germany) Andreas Bergmann	Mutual consent	28 October 2012	17th	(Germany) Karsten Neitzel (caretaker)	28 October 2012
Jahn Regensburg	(Germany) Oscar Corrochano	Sacked	4 November 2012	16th	(Poland) Franciszek Smuda	2 January 2013
1860 Munich	(Germany) Reiner Maurer	Sacked	18 November 2012	7th	(Germany) Alexander Schmidt	18 November 2012
SV Sandhausen	(Germany) Gerd Dais	Sacked	19 November 2012	17th	(Germany) Hans-Jürgen Boysen	20 November 2012
Dynamo Dresden	(Germany) Ralf Loose	Sacked	9 December 2012	16th	(Austria) Peter Pacult	3 January 2013
VfL Bochum	(Germany) Karsten Neitzel	End of tenure as caretaker	8 April 2013	16th	(Germany) Peter Neururer	8 April 2013
FC Erzgebirge Aue	(Germany) Karsten Baumann	Sacked	28 April 2013	15th	(Germany) Falko Götz	29 April 2013
SC Paderborn 07	(Germany) Stephan Schmidt	Sacked	5 May 2013	12th	(Germany) René Müller (caretaker)	5 May 2013

== League table ==
Pos	Team	Pld	W	D	L	GF	GA	GD	Pts	Promotion, qualification or relegation
1	Hertha BSC (C, P)	34	22	10	2	65	28	+37	76	Promotion to Bundesliga
2	Eintracht Braunschweig (P)	34	19	10	5	52	34	+18	67	Promotion to Bundesliga
3	1. FC Kaiserslautern	34	15	13	6	55	33	+22	58	Qualification for promotion play-offs
4	FSV Frankfurt	34	16	6	12	55	45	+10	54	
5	1. FC Köln	34	14	12	8	43	33	+10	54	
6	1860 Munich	34	12	13	9	39	31	+8	49	
7	Union Berlin	34	13	10	11	50	49	+1	49	
8	Energie Cottbus	34	12	12	10	41	36	+5	48	
9	VfR Aalen	34	12	10	12	40	39	+1	46	
10	FC St. Pauli	34	11	10	13	44	47	−3	43	
11	MSV Duisburg (Note: MSV Duisburg were denied a license for the 2013–14 2. Bundesliga season, and, in accordance with the rules of the DFL (Deutsche Fußball Liga), Duisburg are replaced by the best-placed originally relegated team, SV Sandhausen.) (R)	34	11	10	13	37	49	−12	43	Relegation to 3. Liga
12	SC Paderborn	34	11	9	14	45	45	0	42	
13	FC Ingolstadt	34	10	12	12	36	43	−7	42	
14	VfL Bochum	34	10	8	16	40	52	−12	38	
15	Erzgebirge Aue	34	9	10	15	39	46	−7	37	
16	Dynamo Dresden (O)	34	9	10	15	35	49	−14	37	Qualification for relegation play-offs
17	SV Sandhausen	34	6	8	20	38	66	−28	26	
18	Jahn Regensburg (R)	34	4	7	23	36	65	−29	19	Relegation to 3. Liga

Source: kicker.de
Rules for classification: 1) points; 2) goal difference; 3) number of goals scored.
(C) Champions; (O) Play-off winners; (P) Promoted; (R) Relegated

== Results ==
Home \ Away	AAL	AUE	BSC	UNB	BOC	EBS	FCE	SGD	DUI	FSV	FCI	FCK	KOE	M60	SCP	JRE	SVS	STP
VfR Aalen	—	2–0	0–1	3–0	2–2	0–3	1–1	3–0	0–1	3–0	2–1	1–2	2–0	1–1	0–1	2–1	2–2	0–1
Erzgebirge Aue	1–1	—	0–4	1–1	6–1	1–1	3–0	1–0	0–0	0–2	0–1	1–1	2–0	0–1	0–1	3–1	2–2	0–0
Hertha BSC	2–0	3–2	—	2–2	2–0	3–0	1–1	1–0	4–2	2–1	0–0	1–0	1–1	3–0	2–2	2–1	1–0	1–0
Union Berlin	0–0	3–0	1–2	—	2–1	0–1	3–1	0–0	2–1	1–0	1–1	2–0	2–1	2–2	0–1	1–0	3–1	4–2
VfL Bochum	0–1	0–3	0–2	1–2	—	0–1	2–2	2–1	2–2	1–3	1–1	1–2	2–1	0–0	4–0	0–2	5–2	3–0
Eintracht Braunschweig	1–1	1–1	1–1	4–3	3–0	—	0–0	2–1	3–0	2–2	3–0	1–1	1–0	1–2	2–1	1–0	2–1	1–0
Energie Cottbus	1–1	3–0	1–2	2–1	0–2	3–1	—	2–0	0–1	2–2	1–1	4–2	0–0	1–0	2–1	1–1	3–0	2–0
Dynamo Dresden	0–0	3–1	1–0	0–2	0–3	0–2	1–0	—	0–0	2–1	0–1	1–3	0–2	2–2	2–1	3–1	3–1	3–2
MSV Duisburg	1–4	2–1	2–2	1–2	0–0	1–0	2–1	1–3	—	1–2	0–2	0–0	1–1	1–3	3–2	4–2	2–1	0–0
FSV Frankfurt	6–1	1–0	3–1	3–0	2–1	1–2	1–0	3–1	1–1	—	0–2	0–1	1–1	0–1	1–1	3–1	3–1	2–1
FC Ingolstadt	2–0	1–2	1–1	2–1	2–1	0–1	2–2	1–1	0–1	0–2	—	1–1	0–3	0–2	1–3	4–2	1–1	0–0
1. FC Kaiserslautern	0–1	4–1	1–1	3–3	0–0	1–1	1–0	3–0	2–1	4–1	3–0	—	3–0	0–0	3–0	1–1	3–1	1–2
1. FC Köln	1–0	2–1	1–2	2–0	3–1	2–2	0–1	1–1	0–0	2–1	1–0	3–3	—	1–1	3–0	2–1	1–1	0–0
1860 Munich	3–0	1–1	0–0	3–0	0–1	1–1	1–1	1–1	3–0	1–2	1–1	0–1	0–2	—	1–0	1–0	4–0	0–2
SC Paderborn	2–2	2–0	0–1	1–1	4–0	1–2	0–1	2–2	0–2	3–0	1–3	1–1	1–2	2–0	—	0–0	3–0	1–1
Jahn Regensburg	1–3	1–1	1–5	3–3	0–1	0–1	0–1	0–0	2–0	1–4	1–2	1–3	2–3	1–1	0–2	—	1–3	3–0
SV Sandhausen	1–0	0–1	1–6	2–0	0–1	1–3	3–1	1–1	0–2	1–1	3–1	1–1	0–0	0–1	1–3	1–2	—	4–1
FC St. Pauli	0–1	0–3	2–3	2–2	1–1	5–1	0–0	3–2	4–1	3–0	1–1	1–0	0–1	3–1	2–2	3–2	2–1	—

Source: DFB
Legend: Blue = home team win; Yellow = draw; Red = away team win.

== Promotion/relegation play-offs ==
Dynamo Dresden, who finished 16th, faced VfL Osnabrück, the third-placed 2012–13 3. Liga side for a two-legged play-off. The winner on aggregate score after both matches will earn a spot in the 2013–14 2. Bundesliga. The two sides met in the same fixture two seasons ago, although this time the roles are reversed.

24 May 2013
20:30 CEST

VfL Osnabrück	1–0	Dynamo Dresden
Manno 43'	Report

Osnatel-Arena, Osnabrück
Attendance: 15,500
Referee: Günter Perl (Pullach)

28 May 2013
20:30 CEST

Dynamo Dresden	2–0	VfL Osnabrück
Fiél 31'; Ouali 73'	Report

Glücksgas Stadion, Dresden
Attendance: 29.253
Referee: Peter Gagelmann (Bremen)

Dynamo Dresden won 2–1 on aggregate and retained its 2. Bundesliga spot for the 2013–14 season.

== Season statistics ==
=== Top scorers ===
Rank	Player	Club	Goals
1	(Democratic Republic of the Congo) Dominick Kumbela	Eintracht Braunschweig	19
2	(Germany) Daniel Ginczek	FC St. Pauli	18
2	(Brazil) Ronny	Hertha BSC	18
4	(Cameroon) Mohammadou Idrissou	1. FC Kaiserslautern	17
5	(Ivory Coast) Boubacar Sanogo	Energie Cottbus	15
6	(Switzerland) Albert Bunjaku	1. FC Kaiserslautern	13
6	(Nigeria) Anthony Ujah	1. FC Köln	13
8	(Germany) Benjamin Lauth	TSV 1860 Munich	12
9	(Albania) Edmond Kapllani	FSV Frankfurt	11
9	(Germany) Dennis Kruppke	Eintracht Braunschweig	11
9	(Germany) Frank Löning	SV Sandhausen	11
9	(Colombia) Adrián Ramos	Hertha BSC	11

=== Top assists ===
Rank	Player	Club	Assists
1	(Brazil) Ronny	Hertha BSC	12
2	(Germany) Alexander Baumjohann	1. FC Kaiserslautern	11
3	(Germany) Torsten Mattuschka	1. FC Union Berlin	9
3	(Germany) Marc Rzatkowski	VfL Bochum	9
5	(Germany) Marco Stiepermann	Energie Cottbus	8
5	(Germany) Moritz Stoppelkamp	TSV 1860 Munich	8
7	(Cameroon) Mohammadou Idrissou	1. FC Kaiserslautern	7
7	(Colombia) Adrián Ramos	Hertha BSC	7
7	(Germany) Mario Vrančić	SC Paderborn 07	7
10	(Germany) Daniel Adlung	Energie Cottbus	6
10	(Germany) Daniel Brückner	SC Paderborn 07	6
10	(Germany) Daniel Halfar	TSV 1860 Munich	6
10	(Germany) Oliver Hein	SSV Jahn Regensburg	6
10	(Germany) Jan Hochscheidt	FC Erzgebirge Aue	6
10	(Germany) Ken Reichel	Eintracht Braunschweig	6

=== Hat-tricks ===
Player	For	Against	Result	Date
(Democratic Republic of the Congo) Dominick Kumbela	Eintracht Braunschweig	1. FC Union Berlin	4–3	17 December 2012

=== Scoring ===
- First goal of the season: Stefan Leitl for FC Ingolstadt 04 against FC Energie Cottbus (3 August 2012)
- Fastest goal of the season: Idir Ouali for Dynamo Dresden against MSV Duisburg (25 August 2012)
- Largest winning margin: 5 goals
  - Erzgebirge Aue 6–1 VfL Bochum (27 October 2012)
  - SV Sandhausen 1–6 Hertha BSC (9 November 2012)
- Highest scoring game: 7 goals
  - Erzgebirge Aue 6–1 VfL Bochum (27 October 2012)
  - SV Sandhausen 1–6 Hertha BSC (9 November 2012)
  - VfL Bochum 5–2 SV Sandhausen (18 November 2012)
  - Eintracht Braunschweig 4–3 1. FC Union Berlin (17 December 2012)
