= 2022–23 SC Paderborn 07 season =

SC Paderborn 07
2022–23 season
- President: Elmar Volkmann
- Head coach: Lukas Kwasniok
- Stadium: Benteler-Arena
- 2. Bundesliga: 6th
- DFB-Pokal: Round of 16
- Top goalscorer: League: Robert Leipertz (11); All: Marvin Pieringer (14)
| colours | Away colours | Third colours |

The 2022–23 season was the 116th season in the history of SC Paderborn and their third consecutive season in the second division. The club participated in the 2. Bundesliga and the DFB-Pokal.

== Players ==
As of 12 July 2022

Note: Flags indicate national team as defined under FIFA eligibility rules; some limited exceptions apply. Players may hold more than one non-FIFA nationality.

| No. | Pos. | Nation | Player |
|---|---|---|---|
| 1 | GK | GER | Moritz Schulze |
| 2 | DF | GER | Uwe Hünemeier |
| 4 | DF | SUI | Jasper van der Werff |
| 5 | MF | GER | Marcel Mehlem |
| 6 | MF | GER | Marco Schuster |
| 7 | FW | GER | Richmond Tachie |
| 8 | MF | GER | Ron Schallenberg (captain) |
| 10 | MF | GER | Julian Justvan |
| 11 | FW | GER | Sirlord Conteh |
| 13 | MF | GER | Robert Leipertz |
| 14 | MF | GHA | Kelvin Ofori |
| 15 | DF | GER | Tobias Müller |
| 17 | GK | GER | Leopold Zingerle |

| No. | Pos. | Nation | Player |
|---|---|---|---|
| 18 | FW | GER | Dennis Srbeny |
| 19 | FW | AUS | John Iredale |
| 20 | DF | POL | Adrian Gryszkiewicz |
| 21 | GK | GER | Jannik Huth |
| 23 | DF | PHI | Raphael Obermair |
| 24 | DF | GER | Jannis Heuer |
| 26 | MF | POR | Sebastian Klaas |
| 27 | MF | GER | Kai Klefisch |
| 28 | DF | GER | Jonas Carls |
| 30 | MF | KOS | Florent Muslija |
| 32 | DF | GER | Robin Bormuth |
| 33 | DF | GER | Marcel Hoffmeier |
| 36 | FW | GER | Felix Platte |

== Pre-season and friendlies ==
Win Draw Loss Fixtures

| 11 June 2022 Friendly | Minnesota United (United States) | 4–3 | (Germany) SC Paderborn | Saint Paul, United States |
| 19:00 (UTC-5) | | | | Stadium: Allianz Field |

| 16 June 2022 Friendly | Forward Madison (United States) | 1–2 | (Germany) SC Paderborn | Madison, United States |
| 19:00 (UTC-5) | | | | Stadium: Breese Stevens Field |

| 25 June 2022 Friendly | Verl (Germany) | 2–2 | (Germany) SC Paderborn | Paderborn, Germany |
| 13:00 CEST (UTC+2) | | | | Stadium: Trainings- und Nachwuchsleistungszentrum Platz 4 |

| 2 July 2022 Friendly | Ajax (Netherlands) | 2–5 | (Germany) SC Paderborn | Oldenzaal, Netherlands |
| 13:00 CEST (UTC+2) | Ihattaren 4', 24' | | Obermair 2'; Conteh 67'; Ofori 77'; Srbeny 78'; Iredale 89' | Stadium: Sportpark Vondersweijde; Attendance: 2600; Referee: Richard Martens |

| 8 July 2022 Friendly | SC Paderborn (Germany) | 2–0 | (Germany) VfL Bochum | Paderborn, Germany |
| 18:30 CEST (UTC+2) | Muslija 40' (pen.); Heuer 58' | | | Stadium: Home Deluxe Arena |

| 9 July 2022 Friendly | SC Paderborn (Germany) | 2–0 | (Germany) VfL Osnabrück | Paderborn, Germany |
| 13:00 CEST (UTC+2) | | | | Stadium: Trainings- und Nachwuchsleistungszentrum Platz 4 |

| 26 July 2022 Friendly | SC Paderborn (Germany) | 1–0 | (Turkey) Antalyaspor | Paderborn, Germany |
| 13:00 CEST (UTC+2) | Srbeny 29' | | | Stadium: Trainings- und Nachwuchsleistungszentrum Platz 4 |

| 11 September 2022 Friendly | SC Paderborn (Germany) | 4–1 | (Germany) Viktoria Köln | Paderborn, Germany |
| CEST (UTC+2) | | | | Attendance: 0 |

| 9 December 2022 Friendly | SC Paderborn (Germany) | 1–0 | (Germany) Hannover 96 | Paderborn, Germany |
| 12:00 CET (UTC+1) | Conteh 38' | Report |

| 10 December 2022 Friendly | SC Paderborn (Germany) | 1–2 | (Germany) VfL Osnabrück | Paderborn, Germany |
| 13:00 CET (UTC+1) | | Report | | Stadium: Trainings- und Nachwuchsleistungszentrum Platz 1 |

| 17 December 2022 Friendly | Rot-Weiss Essen (Germany) | 3–2 | (Germany) SC Paderborn | Essen, Germany |
| 13:00 CET (UTC+1) | | Report | | Stadium: Stadion Essen |

| 7 January 2023 Friendly | SC Paderborn (Germany) | 4–0 | (Germany) MSV Duisburg | Paderborn, Germany |
| 13:00 CET (UTC+1) | | | | Stadium: Trainings- und Nachwuchsleistungszentrum Platz 1 |

| 11 January 2023 Friendly | St. Gallen (Switzerland) | 1–0 | (Germany) SC Paderborn | San Pedro del Pinatar, Spain |
| 15:00 CET (UTC+1) | | | | Stadium: Pinatar Arena |

== Competitions ==
=== Overall record ===
| Competition | First match | Last match | Starting round | Final position | Record | | | | | | | |
| Competition | First match | Last match | Starting round | Final position | Pld | W | D | L | GF | GA | GD | Win % |
|---|---|---|---|---|---|---|---|---|---|---|---|---|
| 2. Bundesliga | 17 July 2022 | 28 May 2023 | Matchday 1 | 6th | 34 | 16 | 7 | 11 | 68 | 44 | +24 | 47.06 |
| DFB-Pokal | 30 July 2022 | 31 January 2023 | First round | Round of 16 | 3 | 1 | 1 | 1 | 13 | 4 | +9 | 33.33 |
| Total | | | | | 37 | 17 | 8 | 12 | 81 | 48 | +33 | 45.95 |

Source: Soccerway

=== 2. Bundesliga ===
==== League table ====
| Pos | Team | Pld | W | D | L | GF | GA | GD | Pts |
|---|---|---|---|---|---|---|---|---|---|
| 4 | Fortuna Düsseldorf | 34 | 17 | 7 | 10 | 60 | 43 | +17 | 58 |
| 5 | FC St. Pauli | 34 | 16 | 10 | 8 | 55 | 39 | +16 | 58 |
| 6 | SC Paderborn | 34 | 16 | 7 | 11 | 68 | 44 | +24 | 55 |
| 7 | Karlsruher SC | 34 | 13 | 7 | 14 | 56 | 53 | +3 | 46 |
| 8 | Holstein Kiel | 34 | 12 | 10 | 12 | 58 | 61 | −3 | 46 |

Source: DFB
Rules for classification: 1) Points; 2) Goal difference; 3) Goals scored; 4) Head-to-head results; 5) Head-to-head away goals scored; 6) Away goals scored; 7) Play-off.

==== Results summary ====
| Overall | | | | | | | | Home | | | | | | Away | | | | | |
| Pld | W | D | L | GF | GA | GD | Pts | W | D | L | GF | GA | GD | W | D | L | GF | GA | GD |
|---|---|---|---|---|---|---|---|---|---|---|---|---|---|---|---|---|---|---|---|
| 34 | 16 | 7 | 11 | 68 | 44 | +24 | 55 | 12 | 0 | 5 | 46 | 20 | +26 | 4 | 7 | 6 | 22 | 24 | −2 |

Source: DFB

==== Results by round ====
| Round | 1 | 2 | 3 | 4 | 5 | 6 | 7 | 8 | 9 | 10 | 11 | 12 | 13 | 14 | 15 | 16 | 17 | 18 | 19 | 20 | 21 | 22 | 23 | 24 | 25 | 26 | 27 | 28 | 29 | 30 | 31 | 32 | 33 | 34 |
|---|---|---|---|---|---|---|---|---|---|---|---|---|---|---|---|---|---|---|---|---|---|---|---|---|---|---|---|---|---|---|---|---|---|---|
| Ground | H | A | H | A | H | A | H | H | A | H | A | H | A | H | A | H | A | A | H | A | H | A | H | A | A | H | A | H | A | H | A | H | A | H |
| Result | W | L | W | W | W | D | W | W | L | L | W | W | D | L | L | L | L | W | W | W | W | D | L | D | L | W | L | W | D | W | D | W | D | L |
| Position | 6 | 6 | 3 | 1 | 1 | 1 | 1 | 1 | 2 | 3 | 3 | 2 | 2 | 3 | 4 | 5 | 6 | 5 | 5 | 4 | 4 | 4 | 4 | 4 | 6 | 5 | 6 | 6 | 4 | 4 | 6 | 6 | 6 | 6 |

Source: DFB
A = Away; H = Home; W = Win; D = Draw; L = Loss

==== Matches ====
The league fixtures were announced on 17 June 2022.

| 17 July 2022 1 | SC Paderborn | 5–0 | Karlsruher SC | Paderborn |
| 13:30 CEST (UTC+2) | | | | Stadium: Benteler-Arena |

| 22 July 2022 2 | Fortuna Düsseldorf | 2–1 | SC Paderborn | Düsseldorf |
| 18:30 CEST (UTC+2) | | | | Stadium: Merkur Spiel-Arena |

| 6 August 2022 3 | SC Paderborn | 4–2 | Hannover 96 | Paderborn |
| 13:00 CEST (UTC+2) | | | | Stadium: Benteler-Arena |

| 12 August 2022 4 | 1. FC Kaiserslautern | 0–1 | SC Paderborn | Kaiserslautern |
| 18:30 CEST (UTC+2) | Ritter (yellow card) 34'; Zuck (red card) 49'; Tomiak (yellow card) 52'; Lobinger (yellow card) 90+2' | Report | Pieringer (yellow card) 52'; Schallenberg (yellow card) 63'; Huth (yellow card) 66'; Platte 82' | Stadium: Fritz-Walter-Stadion; Attendance: 33,098; Referee: (Germany) Matthias Jöllenbeck |

| 20 August 2022 5 | SC Paderborn | 7–2 | Holstein Kiel | Paderborn |
| 13:00 CEST (UTC+2) | Muslija 7' (pen.); Justvan 13'; Obermair 25'; Platte 29' 38'; Pieringer 52'; Srbeny 80'; Carls (yellow card) 84' | Report | Pichler (yellow card) 6'; Korb 9'; Sander (yellow card) 37'; Erras (yellow card) 40'; Skrzybski 45+1'; Arp (yellow card) 66' | Stadium: Benteler-Arena; Attendance: 9,641; Referee: (Germany) Florian Exner |

| 27 August 2022 6 | St. Pauli | 2–2 | SC Paderborn | Hamburg |
| 13:00 CEST (UTC+2) | Otto (yellow card) 38'; Nemeth (yellow card) 72' (goal) 90+3'; Amenyido 83' | Report | Pieringer 44'; Justvan (yellow card) 61'; Conteh 90+1' | Stadium: Millerntor-Stadion; Attendance: 29,269; Referee: (Germany) Deniz Aytekin |

| 3 September 2022 7 | SC Paderborn | 1–0 | Magdeburg | Paderborn |
| 13:00 CEST (UTC+2) | Rohr (yellow card) 56'; Srbeny (yellow card) 75'; Pieringer 79' | Report | Müller (yellow card) 7'; Lawrence (yellow card) 28' (yellow-red card) 40'; Reimann (yellow card) 42' | Stadium: Benteler-Arena; Attendance: 11,213; Referee: (Germany) Sven Waschitzki |

| 10 September 2022 8 | SC Paderborn | 3–0 | Jahn Regensburg | Paderborn |
| 13:00 CEST (UTC+2) | Hoffmeier 21'; Müller (yellow card) 56'; Leipertz 69'; Pieringer 86'; Justvan (yellow card) 89' | Report | Kennedy (yellow card) 27'; Gimber (yellow card) 39'; Breitkreuz (red card) 68' | Stadium: Benteler-Arena; Attendance: 9,276; Referee: (Germany) Florian Badstübner |

| 18 September 2022 9 | Greuther Fürth | 2–1 | SC Paderborn | Fürth |
| 13:30 CEST (UTC+2) | Michalski 42'; Ache (yellow card) 44'; Green (yellow card) 68'; Hrgota 73' (yellow card) 79'; Griesbeck (yellow card) 82'; Schaffran (yellow card) 90+2' | Report | Schallenberg (yellow card) 48'; Srbeny 49'; Obermair (yellow card) 69'; Pieringer (yellow card) 82'; Huth (yellow card) 90+4' | Stadium: Sportpark Ronhof Thomas Sommer; Attendance: 8,530; Referee: (Germany) Florian Heft |

| 30 September 2022 10 | SC Paderborn | 1–2 | Darmstadt 98 | Paderborn |
| 18:30 CEST (UTC+2) | Leipertz 3' | Report | Manu 10'; Müller 24' (yellow card) 90+2'; Pfeiffer (yellow card) 71' | Stadium: Benteler-Arena; Attendance: 11,238; Referee: (Germany) Benjamin Cortus |

| 8 October 2022 11 | Hansa Rostock | 0–3 | SC Paderborn | Rostock |
| 13:00 CET (UTC+1) | Scherff (yellow card) 72'; Thill (yellow card) 74' | Report | Hünemeier (yellow card) 8'; Schallenberg 19'; Leipertz 80'; Pieringer 88' | Stadium: Ostseestadion; Attendance: 24,500; Referee: (Germany) Felix Zwayer |

| 16 October 2022 12 | SC Paderborn | 3–0 | Sandhausen | Paderborn |
| 13:30 CET (UTC+1) | Pieringer 10'; Rohr (yellow card) 23'; Leipertz 47'; Heuer 54' | Report | Sicker (yellow card) 7'; Höhn (yellow card) 78' | Stadium: Benteler-Arena; Attendance: 9,663; Referee: (Germany) Tobias Reichel |

| 22 October 2022 13 | Eintracht Braunschweig | 0–0 | SC Paderborn | Braunschweig |
| 13:00 CET (UTC+1) | Schultz (yellow card) 28' | Report | Platte (yellow card) 29'; Muslija (yellow card) 60'; Müller (yellow card) 90' | Stadium: Eintracht-Stadion; Attendance: 16,844; Referee: (Germany) Florian Lechner |

| 30 October 2022 14 | SC Paderborn | 3–2 | Hamburg | Paderborn |
| 13:30 CET (UTC+1) | Leipertz 3' 51'; Muslija (yellow card) 42'; Rohr (yellow card) 82' | Report | Glatzel 23'; Dompé 45+1'; Bénes 69' | Stadium: Benteler-Arena; Attendance: 15,000; Referee: (Germany) Florian Badstübner |

| 5 November 2022 15 | 1. FC Heidenheim | 3–0 | SC Paderborn | Heidenheim an der Brenz |
| 13:00 CET (UTC+1) | Maloney (yellow card) 19'; Beste 35' 90+1'; Thomalla 76' | Report | Schallenberg (yellow card) 54'; Hoffmeier (yellow card) 54' | Stadium: Voith-Arena; Attendance: 9,444; Referee: (Germany) Timo Gerach |

| 8 November 2022 16 | SC Paderborn | 0–2 | Arminia Bielefeld | Paderborn |
| 18:30 CET (UTC+1) | Huth (red card) 8'; Muslija (yellow card) 36'; Pieringer (yellow card) 55' | Report | Klünter (yellow card) 21' (yellow-red card) 69'; Vasiliadis (yellow card) 28' (goal) 45+2'; Serra 40'; Oczipka (yellow card) 55'; Lepinjica (yellow card) 80'; Fraisl (yellow card) 82' | Stadium: Benteler-Arena; Attendance: 15,000; Referee: (Germany) Martin Thomsen |

| 13 November 2022 17 | 1. FC Nürnberg | 2–1 | SC Paderborn | Nürnberg |
| 13:30 CET (UTC+1) | Tempelmann (yellow card) 31'; Duah 36' 55'; Breunig (yellow card) 75'; Sadik Fofana (yellow card) 81'; Shuranov (yellow card) 90+4' | Report | Pieringer (yellow card) 25' (yellow-red card) 88'; Justvan 64' | Stadium: Max-Morlock-Stadion; Attendance: 25,527; Referee: (Germany) Robert Kampka |

| 27 January 2023 18 | Karlsruher SC | 0–1 | SC Paderborn | Karlsruhe |
| 18:30 CET (UTC+1) | Nebel (yellow card) 63'; Ambrosius (yellow card) 90+5' | Report | Müller (yellow card) 5'; Conteh (yellow card) 62'; Hoffmeier (yellow card) 84'; Leipertz 90+2' | Stadium: BBBank Wildpark; Attendance: 17,151; Referee: (Germany) Patrick Alt |

| 3 February 2023 19 | SC Paderborn | 4–1 | Fortuna Düsseldorf | Paderborn |
| 18:30 CET (UTC+1) | Pieringer 37'; Heuer 62'; Muslija 68' (pen.); Leipertz 81' | Report | Peterson (yellow card) 11'; Hennings 59' (pen.) | Stadium: Benteler-Arena; Attendance: 12,179; Referee: (Germany) Tobias Reichel |

| 11 February 2023 20 | Hannover 96 | 3–4 | SC Paderborn | Hanover |
| 13:00 CET (UTC+1) | Teuchert 2' 4'; Leopold (yellow card) 34'; Nielsen (yellow card) 41'; Beier 83'; Momuluh (yellow card) 87' | Report | Leipertz 6' 55'; Schallenberg (yellow card) 21'; Muslija 26' (pen.) (yellow card) 65'; Pieringer (yellow card) 69'; Conteh 71'; Rohr (yellow card) 73' | Stadium: Heinz-von-Heiden-Arena; Attendance: 25,100; Referee: (Germany) Benjamin Cortus |

| 17 February 2023 21 | SC Paderborn | 1–0 | 1. FC Kaiserslautern | Paderborn |
| 18:30 CET (UTC+1) | Heuer 78' | Report | Zuck (yellow card) 52'; Tomiak (yellow card) 75'; Bormuth (yellow card) 89' | Stadium: Benteler-Arena; Attendance: 14,701; Referee: (Germany) Sven Jablonski |

| 25 February 2023 22 | Holstein Kiel | 1–1 | SC Paderborn | Kiel |
| 13:00 CET (UTC+1) | Erras (yellow card) 62'; Reese 66' (pen.) | Report | Schallenberg (yellow card) 21'; Rohr 31'; Humphreys (yellow card) 70' | Stadium: Holstein-Stadion; Attendance: 12,469; Referee: (Germany) Wolfgang Haslberger |

| 3 March 2023 23 | SC Paderborn | 1–2 | FC St. Pauli | Paderborn |
| 18:30 CET (UTC+1) | Mets 50' (o.g.); Niclas Nadj (yellow card) 66'; Muslija (yellow card) 75'; Conteh (yellow card) 75' (yellow-red card) 75' | Report | Daschner 15' 42'; Irvine (yellow card) 45'; Vasilj (yellow card) 84' | Stadium: Benteler-Arena; Attendance: 15,000; Referee: (Germany) Aarne Aarnink |

| 11 March 2023 24 | 1. FC Magdeburg | 0–0 | SC Paderborn | Magdeburg |
| 13:00 CET (UTC+1) | El Hankouri (yellow card) 42'; Castaignos (yellow card) 58'; Condé (yellow card) 90+1' | Report | Hoffmeier (yellow card) 89' | Stadium: MDCC-Arena; Attendance: 20,325; Referee: (Germany) Nicolas Winter |

| 18 March 2023 25 | SSV Jahn Regensburg | 1–0 | SC Paderborn | Regensburg |
| 13:00 CET (UTC+1) | Owusu 49' (pen.); Gimber (yellow card) 89' | Report | | Stadium: Jahnstadion Regensburg; Attendance: 10,189; Referee: (Germany) Martin Thomsen |

| 2 April 2023 26 | SC Paderborn | 3–2 | Greuther Fürth | Paderborn |
| 13:30 CET (UTC+1) | Schallenberg 13'; Muslija 61'; Klefisch (yellow card) 75'; Conteh 76' | Report | Michalski (yellow card) 47'; Abiama 82'; Hrgota 87' | Stadium: Benteler-Arena; Attendance: 10,952; Referee: (Germany) Michael Bacher |

| 9 April 2023 27 | Darmstadt 98 | 2–1 | SC Paderborn | Darmstadt |
| 13:30 CET (UTC+1) | Bader 35'; Karić (yellow card) 50'; Manu 59' | Report | Muslija (yellow card) 38' (goal) 44' (pen.); Obermair (yellow card) 45+1'; Schallenberg (yellow card) 49' | Stadium: Merck-Stadion am Böllenfalltor; Attendance: 16,674; Referee: (Germany) Max Burda |

| 15 April 2023 28 | SC Paderborn | 3–0 | Hansa Rostock | Paderborn |
| 13:00 CET (UTC+1) | Rohr 48'; Muslija 78'; Platte 87'; Schuster (yellow card) 90+1' | Report | Schumacher (yellow card) 20'; Scherff (red card) 27' | Stadium: Benteler-Arena; Attendance: 12,456; Referee: (Germany) Martin Petersen |

| 23 April 2023 29 | SV Sandhausen | 2–2 | SC Paderborn | Sandhausen |
| 13:30 CET (UTC+1) | Zhirov (yellow card) 29'; Ademi 31'; Evina 48' | Report | Mulija 19'; Platte (yellow card) 22'; Rohr 27' | Stadium: BWT-Stadion am Hardtwald; Attendance: 3,806; Referee: (Germany) Tobias Stieler |

| 28 April 2023 30 | SC Paderborn | 5–1 | Eintracht Braunschweig | Paderborn |
| 18:30 CET (UTC+1) | Justvan 28'; Obermair 45+1'; Conteh 51'; Schallenberg (yellow card) 54'; Müller (yellow card) 56'; Srbeny 90' 90+4' | Report | Nikolaou (yellow card) 40'; Ujah 53'; Krauße (yellow card) 59'; Kuruçay (yellow card) 64'; Behrendt (yellow card) 90+2' | Stadium: Benteler-Arena; Attendance: 13,266; Referee: (Germany) Benjamin Cortus |

| 5 May 2023 31 | Hamburger SV | 2–2 | SC Paderborn | Hamburg |
| 18:30 CET (UTC+1) | Schonlau (yellow card) 28'; Glatzel 39'; Kittel 49'; Heyer (yellow card) 55'; Muheim (yellow card) 72'; Bénes (yellow card) 86' | Report | Justvan 43'; Muslija 73' (pen.); Niclas Nadj (yellow card) 81' | Stadium: Volksparkstadion; Attendance: 57,000; Referee: (Germany) Robin Braun |

| 14 May 2023 32 | SC Paderborn | 3–2 | 1. FC Heidenheim | Paderborn |
| 13:30 CET (UTC+1) | Klefisch 26'; Pieringer 50'; Muslija 52'; Srbeny (yellow card) 83'; Rohr (yellow card) 86' | Report | Kleindienst 30'; Burnić (yellow card) 34'; Thomalla 37' | Stadium: Benteler-Arena; Attendance: 11,946; Referee: (Germany) Daniel Siebert (referee) |

| 20 May 2023 33 | Arminia Bielefeld | 2–2 | SC Paderborn | Bielefeld |
| 13:00 CET (UTC+1) | Lasme 8' (yellow card) 79'; Vasiliadis 36' | Report | Pieringer 24'; Conteh 58' | Stadium: SchücoArena; Attendance: 26,515; Referee: (Germany) Frank Willenborg |

| 28 May 2023 34 | SC Paderborn | 0–1 | 1. FC Nürnberg | Paderborn |
| 15:30 CET (UTC+1) | Schallenberg (yellow card) 64' | Report | Schleimer 20'; Horn (yellow card) 40'; Nathaniel Brown (yellow card) 73' | Stadium: Benteler-Arena; Attendance: 15,000; Referee: (Germany) Sascha Stegemann |

=== DFB-Pokal ===
| 30 July 2022 First round | Einheit Wernigerode | 0–10 | SC Paderborn | Wernigerode (Note: The Einheit Wernigerode v SC Paderborn match took place at the Sportforum Wernigerode instead of Einheit Wernigerode's home stadium, the Mannsberg-Stadion.) |
| 15:31 CEST (UTC+2) | | Report | Justvan 7', 46'; Leipertz 10', 58'; Pieringer 40', 50', 53', 90'; Srbeny 49'; Tachie 67' | Stadium: Sportforum Wernigerode; Attendance: 3,000; Referee: Richard Hempel |

| 19 October 2022 Second round | SC Paderborn | 2–2 (a.e.t.) (5–4 p) | Werder Bremen | Paderborn |
| 18:00 CEST (UTC+2) | Platte 22'; Conteh 42'; Pieringer (yellow card) 85'; Rohr (yellow card) 90+1'; Heuer (yellow card) 114' | Report | Bittencourt 65'; Weiser (yellow card) 68', (goal) 84'; Schmidt (yellow card) 95'; Füllkrug (yellow card) 104' | Stadium: Home Deluxe Arena; Attendance: 15,000; Referee: Frank Willenborg |
| | Penalties |
| | Leipertz (penalty scored); Justvan (penalty scored); Muslija (penalty scored); Srbeny (penalty scored); Tachie (penalty scored) | | (penalty scored) Füllkrug; (penalty scored) Veljković; (penalty scored) Schmidt; (penalty scored) Gruev; (penalty missed) Bittencourt |

| 31 January 2023 Round of 16 | SC Paderborn | 1–2 | VfB Stuttgart | Paderborn |
| 18:00 CET (UTC+1) | Mavropanos 3' (o.g.); Pieringer (yellow card) 18'; Muslija (yellow card) 89' | Report | Perea (yellow card) 15'; Guirassy (yellow card) 55', (goal) 90+5'; Mavropanos (yellow card) 72'; Karazor (yellow card) 74'; Dias 86' | Stadium: Home Deluxe Arena; Attendance: 14,000; Referee: Daniel Schlager |
