= List of German football transfers winter 2023–24 =

This is a list of German football transfers in the winter transfer window 2023–24 by club. Only transfers of the Bundesliga, and 2. Bundesliga are included.

== Bundesliga ==
Note: Flags indicate national team as has been defined under FIFA eligibility rules. Players may hold more than one non-FIFA nationality.

=== Bayern Munich ===
In:

No.	Pos.	Nation	Player
15	DF	ENG	Eric Dier (on loan from Tottenham Hotspur)
17	MF	ESP	Bryan Zaragoza (from Granada)
23	DF	FRA	Sacha Boey (from Galatasaray)

Out:

No.	Pos.	Nation	Player
41	DF	GER	Frans Krätzig (on loan to Austria Wien)

=== Borussia Dortmund ===
In:

No.	Pos.	Nation	Player
10	FW	ENG	Jadon Sancho (on loan from Manchester United)
22	DF	NED	Ian Maatsen (on loan from Chelsea)

Out:

No.	Pos.	Nation	Player
7	MF	USA	Giovanni Reyna (on loan to Nottingham Forest)
24	DF	BEL	Thomas Meunier (to Trabzonspor)

=== RB Leipzig ===
In:

No.	Pos.	Nation	Player
6	MF	MKD	Eljif Elmas (from Napoli)

Out:

No.	Pos.	Nation	Player
10	MF	SWE	Emil Forsberg (to New York Red Bulls)
11	FW	GER	Timo Werner (on loan to Tottenham Hotspur)
18	MF	POR	Fábio Carvalho (loan return to Liverpool)
26	MF	GUI	Ilaix Moriba (on loan to Getafe)
—	DF	ESP	Angeliño (on loan to Roma, previously on loan at Galatasaray)
—	DF	ESP	Hugo Novoa (on loan to Villarreal B, previously on loan at Utrecht)
—	MF	USA	Caden Clark (to Minnesota United, previously on loan at Vendsyssel)

=== Union Berlin ===
In:

No.	Pos.	Nation	Player
2	DF	GER	Kevin Vogt (from TSG Hoffenheim)
11	FW	CIV	Chris Bedia (from Servette)
14	FW	BEL	Yorbe Vertessen (from PSV)

Out:

No.	Pos.	Nation	Player
11	FW	CIV	David Datro Fofana (loan return to Chelsea)
17	FW	GER	Kevin Behrens (to VfL Wolfsburg)
23	DF	ITA	Leonardo Bonucci (to Fenerbahçe)
27	FW	SUR	Sheraldo Becker (to Real Sociedad)
36	MF	GER	Aljoscha Kemlein (on loan to FC St. Pauli)
38	MF	GER	Laurenz Dehl (to Austria Klagenfurt)
39	GK	GER	Yannic Stein (on loan to VfB Lübeck)
—	MF	JPN	Keita Endo (on loan to FC Tokyo, previously on loan at Eintracht Braunschweig)
—	DF	GER	Mathis Bruns (to FSV Luckenwalde, previously on loan at Stuttgarter Kickers)

=== SC Freiburg ===
In:

No.	Pos.	Nation	Player
23	MF	KOS	Florent Muslija (from SC Paderborn)
41	DF	HUN	Attila Szalai (on loan from TSG Hoffenheim)

Out:

No.	Pos.	Nation	Player

=== Bayer Leverkusen ===
In:

No.	Pos.	Nation	Player
9	FW	ESP	Borja Iglesias (on loan from Real Betis)

Out:

No.	Pos.	Nation	Player
11	MF	GER	Nadiem Amiri (to Mainz 05)

=== Eintracht Frankfurt ===
In:

No.	Pos.	Nation	Player
9	FW	AUT	Saša Kalajdžić (on loan from Wolverhampton Wanderers)
11	FW	FRA	Hugo Ekitike (on loan from Paris Saint-Germain)
19	FW	FRA	Jean-Mattéo Bahoya (from Angers)
25	MF	NED	Donny van de Beek (on loan from Manchester United)
—	DF	GER	Nathaniel Brown (from 1. FC Nürnberg)
—	DF	SUI	Aurèle Amenda (from Young Boys)

Out:

No.	Pos.	Nation	Player
6	MF	CRO	Kristijan Jakić (on loan to FC Augsburg)
18	FW	GER	Jessic Ngankam (on loan to Mainz 05)
21	FW	ARG	Lucas Alario (to Internacional)
23	MF	NOR	Jens Petter Hauge (on loan to Bodø/Glimt)
28	MF	GER	Marcel Wenig (on loan to 1. FC Nürnberg)
30	MF	USA	Paxten Aaronson (on loan to Vitesse)
—	DF	GER	Nathaniel Brown (on loan to 1. FC Nürnberg)
—	DF	SUI	Aurèle Amenda (on loan to Young Boys)
—	FW	COL	Rafael Borré (to Internacional, previously on loan at Werder Bremen)

=== VfL Wolfsburg ===
In:

No.	Pos.	Nation	Player
17	FW	GER	Kevin Behrens (from Union Berlin)

Out:

No.	Pos.	Nation	Player
8	DF	FRA	Nicolas Cozza (on loan to Nantes)
35	GK	GER	Philipp Schulze (on loan to Hallescher FC)
42	DF	GER	Felix Lange (on loan to SV Rödinghausen)

=== Mainz 05 ===
In:

No.	Pos.	Nation	Player
11	FW	GER	Jessic Ngankam (on loan from Eintracht Frankfurt)
18	MF	GER	Nadiem Amiri (from Bayer Leverkusen)

Out:

No.	Pos.	Nation	Player
4	MF	MAR	Aymen Barkok (on loan to Hertha BSC)
34	MF	NED	Anwar El Ghazi (free agent)
—	MF	GER	Niklas Tauer (on loan to Eintracht Braunschweig, previously on loan at Schalke 04)

=== Borussia Mönchengladbach ===
In:

No.	Pos.	Nation	Player

Out:

No.	Pos.	Nation	Player
11	MF	AUT	Hannes Wolf (to New York City)
38	MF	LUX	Yvandro Borges Sanches (on loan to NEC Nijmegen)

=== 1. FC Köln ===
In:

No.	Pos.	Nation	Player

Out:

No.	Pos.	Nation	Player
19	MF	GRE	Dimitrios Limnios (to Panathinaikos)
30	DF	GER	Noah Katterbach (to Hamburger SV)
47	MF	LUX	Mathias Olesen (on loan to Yverdon)

=== TSG Hoffenheim ===
In:

No.	Pos.	Nation	Player
19	DF	CZE	David Jurásek (on loan from Benfica)

Out:

No.	Pos.	Nation	Player
17	MF	GER	Julian Justvan (on loan to Darmstadt 98)
18	MF	MLI	Diadie Samassékou (on loan to Cádiz)
22	DF	GER	Kevin Vogt (to Union Berlin)
41	DF	HUN	Attila Szalai (on loan to SC Freiburg)
48	DF	GER	Joshua Quarshie (on loan to Fortuna Düsseldorf)

=== Werder Bremen ===
In:

No.	Pos.	Nation	Player
21	MF	NOR	Isak Hansen-Aarøen (from Manchester United)
22	DF	ARG	Julián Malatini (from Defensa y Justicia)
28	MF	FRA	Skelly Alvero (on loan from Lyon)

Out:

No.	Pos.	Nation	Player
19	FW	COL	Rafael Borré (loan return to Eintracht Frankfurt)
23	MF	GER	Nicolai Rapp (to Karlsruher SC)
—	FW	GER	Abdenego Nankishi (on loan to 1860 Munich, previously on loan at Heracles Almelo)

=== VfL Bochum ===
In:

No.	Pos.	Nation	Player
17	MF	MKD	Agon Elezi (from Varaždin)
26	GK	GER	Andreas Luthe (from 1. FC Kaiserslautern)

Out:

No.	Pos.	Nation	Player
18	DF	ENG	Jordi Osei-Tutu (on loan to PAS Giannina)
24	MF	GER	Mats Pannewig (on loan to SC Wiedenbrück)
39	FW	FRA	Lys Mousset (free agent)
—	FW	PHI	Gerrit Holtmann (on loan to Darmstadt 98, previously on loan at Antalyaspor)

=== FC Augsburg ===
In:

No.	Pos.	Nation	Player
11	MF	ESP	Pep Biel (on loan from Olympiacos)
17	MF	CRO	Kristijan Jakić (on loan from Eintracht Frankfurt)

Out:

No.	Pos.	Nation	Player
14	MF	JPN	Masaya Okugawa (on loan to Hamburger SV)
34	FW	FRA	Nathanaël Mbuku (on loan to Saint-Étienne)
38	DF	CRO	David Čolina (on loan to Vejle)
39	DF	ENG	Japhet Tanganga (loan return to Tottenham Hotspur)
42	DF	GER	Aaron Zehnter (to SC Paderborn)
48	FW	FRA	Irvin Cardona (on loan to Saint-Étienne)
—	DF	DEN	Frederik Winther (to Hammarby, previously on loan to Estoril)

=== VfB Stuttgart ===
In:

No.	Pos.	Nation	Player
5	MF	GER	Mahmoud Dahoud (on loan from Brighton & Hove Albion)

Out:

No.	Pos.	Nation	Player
19	FW	SRB	Jovan Milošević (on loan to St. Gallen)
22	FW	GER	Thomas Kastanaras (on loan to SSV Ulm)
—	MF	GER	Mateo Klimowicz (to San Luis, previously on loan)

=== 1. FC Heidenheim ===
In:

No.	Pos.	Nation	Player

Out:

No.	Pos.	Nation	Player

=== Darmstadt 98 ===
In:

No.	Pos.	Nation	Player
17	MF	GER	Julian Justvan (on loan from TSG Hoffenheim)
25	FW	PHI	Gerrit Holtmann (on loan from VfL Bochum, previously on loan at Antalyaspor)
40	FW	GER	Sebastian Polter (on loan from Schalke 04)

Out:

No.	Pos.	Nation	Player
10	FW	SUI	Filip Stojilković (on loan to 1. FC Kaiserslautern)
17	DF	GER	Frank Ronstadt (to 1. FC Kaiserslautern)

== 2. Bundesliga ==
=== Schalke 04 ===
In:

No.	Pos.	Nation	Player
21	DF	FRA	Brandon Soppy (on loan from Atalanta, previously on loan at Torino)
23	MF	MKD	Darko Churlinov (on loan from Burnley)

Out:

No.	Pos.	Nation	Player
14	FW	JPN	Sōichirō Kōzuki (on loan to Górnik Zabrze)
21	MF	GER	Niklas Tauer (loan return to Mainz 05)
28	GK	GER	Justin Heekeren (on loan to Patro Eisden)
40	FW	GER	Sebastian Polter (on loan to Darmstadt 98)

=== Hertha BSC ===
In:

No.	Pos.	Nation	Player
18	MF	MAR	Aymen Barkok (on loan from Mainz 05)
23	MF	ENG	Bradley Ibrahim (from Arsenal)

Out:

No.	Pos.	Nation	Player
15	FW	COM	Myziane Maolida (on loan to Hibernian)
21	DF	GER	Anderson Lucoqui (to Eintracht Braunschweig)
28	FW	FRA	Kélian Nsona (on loan to Žilina)

=== Hamburger SV ===
In:

No.	Pos.	Nation	Player
17	MF	JPN	Masaya Okugawa (on loan from FC Augsburg)
33	DF	GER	Noah Katterbach (from 1. FC Köln)

Out:

No.	Pos.	Nation	Player
37	DF	KOS	Valon Zumberi (on loan to FC Schaffhausen)
—	GK	SWE	Marko Johansson (on loan to Hansa Rostock, previously on loan at Halmstad)
—	FW	BFA	Daouda Beleme (on loan to VfB Lübeck, previously on loan at FC Ingolstadt)

=== Fortuna Düsseldorf ===
In:

No.	Pos.	Nation	Player
5	DF	GER	Joshua Quarshie (on loan from TSG Hoffenheim)
22	FW	GER	Christoph Daferner (on loan from 1. FC Nürnberg)
36	FW	AUT	Marlon Mustapha (on loan from Como)

Out:

No.	Pos.	Nation	Player
10	FW	GER	Daniel Ginczek (to MSV Duisburg)

=== FC St. Pauli ===
In:

No.	Pos.	Nation	Player
20	MF	SWE	Erik Ahlstrand (from Halmstad)
36	MF	GER	Aljoscha Kemlein (on loan from Union Berlin)

Out:

No.	Pos.	Nation	Player

=== SC Paderborn ===
In:

No.	Pos.	Nation	Player
10	FW	NED	Koen Kostons (from MVV Maastricht)
32	DF	GER	Aaron Zehnter (from FC Augsburg)

Out:

No.	Pos.	Nation	Player
10	FW	GER	Max Kruse (retired)
15	DF	GER	Tobias Müller (to 1. FC Magdeburg)
18	MF	GER	Michael Martin (to Sirius)
30	MF	KOS	Florent Muslija (to SC Freiburg)
40	MF	GER	Niclas Nadj (on loan to SC Verl)

=== Karlsruher SC ===
In:

No.	Pos.	Nation	Player
17	MF	GER	Nicolai Rapp (from Werder Bremen)

Out:

No.	Pos.	Nation	Player

=== Holstein Kiel ===
In:

No.	Pos.	Nation	Player
2	DF	DEN	Mikkel Kirkeskov (from Zagłębie Lubin)
11	FW	SWE	Alexander Bernhardsson (from Elfsborg)

Out:

No.	Pos.	Nation	Player
11	FW	GER	Ba-Muaka Simakala (on loan to 1. FC Kaiserslautern)

=== 1. FC Kaiserslautern ===
In:

No.	Pos.	Nation	Player
24	FW	GER	Ba-Muaka Simakala (on loan from Holstein Kiel)
25	FW	SUI	Filip Stojilković (on loan from Darmstadt 98)
26	MF	CZE	Filip Kaloč (on loan from Baník Ostrava)
27	DF	GER	Frank Ronstadt (from Darmstadt 98)
32	GK	GER	Robin Himmelmann (free agent)
40	FW	NGA	Dickson Abiama (from Greuther Fürth)

Out:

No.	Pos.	Nation	Player
1	GK	GER	Andreas Luthe (to VfL Bochum)
13	FW	USA	Terrence Boyd (to Waldhof Mannheim)
27	FW	GER	Lex-Tyger Lobinger (on loan to VfL Osnabrück)
37	DF	GER	Erik Durm (retired)

=== Hannover 96 ===
In:

No.	Pos.	Nation	Player

Out:

No.	Pos.	Nation	Player
7	MF	GER	Max Besuschkow (on loan to Austria Klagenfurt)
18	DF	GER	Derrick Köhn (to Galatasaray)
38	FW	GER	Thaddäus-Monju Momuluh (on loan to Arminia Bielefeld)

=== 1. FC Magdeburg ===
In:

No.	Pos.	Nation	Player
8	FW	CPV	Bryan Teixeira (on loan from Sturm Graz)
18	FW	GER	Emir Kuhinja (from SGV Freiberg)
21	DF	GER	Tobias Müller (from SC Paderborn)

Out:

No.	Pos.	Nation	Player
2	DF	ITA	Cristiano Piccini (to Sampdoria)
8	MF	GER	Ahmet Arslan (on loan to Dynamo Dresden)
12	DF	SYR	Belal Halbouni (to Vancouver Whitecaps)
27	DF	GER	Malcolm Cacutalua (to Panevėžys)

=== Greuther Fürth ===
In:

No.	Pos.	Nation	Player
1	GK	GER	Nils Körber (from Hansa Rostock)
20	FW	GER	Leander Popp (from Hertha BSC II)

Out:

No.	Pos.	Nation	Player
1	GK	SWE	Andreas Linde (to Häcken)
11	FW	NGA	Dickson Abiama (to 1. FC Kaiserslautern)

=== Hansa Rostock ===
In:

No.	Pos.	Nation	Player
3	DF	GRE	Kostas Stafylidis (free agent)
40	GK	SWE	Marko Johansson (on loan from Hamburger SV, previously on loan at Halmstad)
45	FW	ISL	Sveinn Aron Guðjohnsen (from Elfsborg)

Out:

No.	Pos.	Nation	Player
11	FW	GER	Serhat-Semih Güler (to 1860 Munich)
23	GK	GER	Nils Körber (to Greuther Fürth)
25	DF	GER	Thomas Meißner (to Gostivar)

=== 1. FC Nürnberg ===
In:

No.	Pos.	Nation	Player
20	FW	SWE	Sebastian Andersson (free agent)
27	DF	GER	Nathaniel Brown (on loan from Eintracht Frankfurt)
33	MF	GER	Marcel Wenig (on loan from Eintracht Frankfurt)

Out:

No.	Pos.	Nation	Player
10	MF	NOR	Mats Møller Dæhli (to Molde)
27	DF	GER	Nathaniel Brown (to Eintracht Frankfurt)
29	DF	GER	Tim Handwerker (on loan to Utrecht)
33	FW	GER	Christoph Daferner (on loan to Fortuna Düsseldorf)
41	MF	MAR	Ali Loune (on loan to Austria Klagenfurt)

=== Eintracht Braunschweig ===
In:

No.	Pos.	Nation	Player
8	MF	GER	Niklas Tauer (on loan from Mainz 05, previously on loan at Schalke 04)
12	MF	SWE	Hampus Finndell (on loan from Djurgården)
15	DF	GER	Anderson Lucoqui (from Hertha BSC)

Out:

No.	Pos.	Nation	Player
8	MF	JPN	Keita Endo (loan return to Union Berlin)
30	DF	GER	Brian Behrendt (to Hallescher FC)
36	FW	GER	Kaan Caliskaner (on loan to Jagiellonia Białystok)

=== SV Elversberg ===
In:

No.	Pos.	Nation	Player
3	DF	FRA	Florian Le Joncour (from RWDM)

Out:

No.	Pos.	Nation	Player
35	DF	AUT	Nico Antonitsch (to Hapoel Petah Tikva)

=== VfL Osnabrück ===
In:

No.	Pos.	Nation	Player
2	DF	GRE	Thanasis Androutsos (from Olympiacos)
21	FW	GER	Lex-Tyger Lobinger (on loan from 1. FC Kaiserslautern)
37	FW	AUT	Thomas Goiginger (from LASK)

Out:

No.	Pos.	Nation	Player
15	MF	GER	Paterson Chato (to Austria Lustenau)
24	DF	AUT	Manuel Haas (free agent)

=== Wehen Wiesbaden ===
In:

No.	Pos.	Nation	Player
25	FW	SRB	Nikolas Agrafiotis (from Excelsior)

Out:

No.	Pos.	Nation	Player
15	DF	ITA	Max Reinthaler (to 1860 Munich)

== See also ==
- 2023–24 Bundesliga
- 2023–24 2. Bundesliga
