= 2020–21 SC Paderborn 07 season =

SC Paderborn
2020–21 season
- Chairman: Elmar Volkmann
- Manager: Steffen Baumgart
- Stadium: Benteler-Arena
- 2. Bundesliga: 9th
- DFB-Pokal: Round of 16
- Top goalscorer: League: Dennis Srbeny (16); All: Dennis Srbeny (18)
| Home colours | Away colours | Third colours |

The 2020–21 SC Paderborn 07 season was the 114th edition of SC Paderborn 07's existence, the club's first season return in the 2. Bundesliga, the second tier of Germany football, following their promotion from the 3. Liga in the 2020–21 season. The club contested in the DFB-Pokal. The season covered the period from 1 July 2020 to 30 June 2021.

== Players ==
=== First-team squad ===
As of 23 January 2021

Note: Flags indicate national team as defined under FIFA eligibility rules; some limited exceptions apply. Players may hold more than one non-FIFA nationality.

| No. | Pos. | Nation | Player |
|---|---|---|---|
| 1 | GK | GER | Moritz Schulze |
| 2 | DF | GER | Uwe Hünemeier |
| 3 | DF | GER | Frederic Ananou |
| 5 | MF | COD | Chadrac Akolo |
| 6 | MF | BEL | Aristote Nkaka (on loan from Anderlecht) |
| 7 | FW | GER | Prince Osei Owusu |
| 8 | MF | GER | Ron Schallenberg |
| 9 | MF | GER | Kai Pröger |
| 10 | MF | GER | Julian Justvan |
| 11 | FW | GER | Sven Michel |
| 12 | DF | GER | Jesse Tugbenyo |
| 13 | DF | GER | Sebastian Schonlau (captain) |
| 14 | DF | SUI | Nicolas Bürgy |
| 16 | MF | GER | Johannes Dörfler |

| No. | Pos. | Nation | Player |
|---|---|---|---|
| 17 | GK | GER | Leopold Zingerle |
| 18 | FW | GER | Dennis Srbeny |
| 20 | FW | GER | Marco Terrazzino |
| 21 | GK | GER | Jannik Huth |
| 22 | MF | GHA | Christopher Antwi-Adjei |
| 23 | MF | GER | Maximilian Thalhammer |
| 24 | MF | GER | Marcel Heller |
| 25 | DF | POR | Marcel Correia |
| 27 | MF | GER | Chris Führich (on loan from Borussia Dortmund II) |
| 29 | DF | NGR | Jamilu Collins |
| 31 | MF | SWE | Svante Ingelsson (on loan from Udinese) |
| 36 | DF | ENG | Chima Okoroji (on loan from SC Freiburg) |
| 39 | MF | GRE | Sebastian Vasiliadis |

=== Players out on loan ===
Note: Flags indicate national team as defined under FIFA eligibility rules; some limited exceptions apply. Players may hold more than one non-FIFA nationality.

| No. | Pos. | Nation | Player |
|---|---|---|---|
| — | MF | ENG | Antony Evans (at Crewe Alexandra) |
| — | MF | BIH | Rifet Kapić (at FC Sheriff Tiraspol) |

| No. | Pos. | Nation | Player |
|---|---|---|---|
| — | MF | GER | Pascal Steinwender (at VfB Lübeck) |

== Pre-season and friendlies ==
Win Draw Loss Fixtures

| 13 August 2020 Friendly | SC Paderborn | 2–1 | KFC Uerdingen 05 | Paderborn, Germany |
| 13:00 CEST (UTC+2) | Ritter 42'; Antwi-Adjei 86' | Report | Kinsombi 64' | Stadium: TNLZ |

| 22 August 2020 Friendly | Borussia Mönchengladbach | 2–0 | SC Paderborn | Harsewinkel, Germany |
| 15:00 CEST (UTC+2) | Wolf 50'; Lainer 68' | Report | | Stadium: Sportanlage Klosterpforte; Attendance: 0 Referee: Robin Braun |

| 28 August 2020 Friendly | Borussia Dortmund | 1–1 | SC Paderborn | Dortmund, Germany |
| 15:30 CEST (UTC+2) | Pherai 30' | Report | Pröger 67' | Stadium: Kunstrasenplatz Fußballpark BVB Hohenbuschei; Attendance: 0 |

| 5 September 2020 Friendly | Fortuna Düsseldorf | 1–0 | SC Paderborn | Düsseldorf, Germany |
| 15:00 CEST (UTC+2) | | | | Stadium: Merkur Spiel-Arena |

| 8 October 2020 Friendly | Schalke 04 | 5–1 | SC Paderborn | Gelsenkirchen, Germany |
| 14:00 CEST (UTC+2) | Uth 21', 31', 81'; Ibišević 45'; Raman 56' | Report | Pröger 13' | Stadium: Parkstadion; Attendance: 300; Referee: Thorben Siewer (Germany) |

== Competitions ==
=== Overview ===
| Competition | First match | Last match | Starting round | Final position | Record | | | | | | | |
| Competition | First match | Last match | Starting round | Final position | Pld | W | D | L | GF | GA | GD | Win % |
|---|---|---|---|---|---|---|---|---|---|---|---|---|
| 2. Bundesliga | 18 September 2020 | 23 May 2021 | Matchday 1 | 9th | 34 | 12 | 11 | 11 | 53 | 45 | +8 | 35.29 |
| DFB-Pokal | 13 September 2020 | 2 February 2021 | First round | Round of 16 | 3 | 2 | 0 | 1 | 10 | 5 | +5 | 66.67 |
| Total | | | | | 37 | 14 | 11 | 12 | 63 | 50 | +13 | 37.84 |

Source: Soccerway

=== 2. Bundesliga ===
==== League table ====
| Pos | Team | Pld | W | D | L | GF | GA | GD | Pts |
|---|---|---|---|---|---|---|---|---|---|
| 7 | Darmstadt 98 | 34 | 15 | 6 | 13 | 63 | 55 | +8 | 51 |
| 8 | 1. FC Heidenheim | 34 | 15 | 6 | 13 | 49 | 49 | 0 | 51 |
| 9 | SC Paderborn | 34 | 12 | 11 | 11 | 53 | 45 | +8 | 47 |
| 10 | FC St. Pauli | 34 | 13 | 8 | 13 | 51 | 56 | −5 | 47 |
| 11 | 1. FC Nürnberg | 34 | 11 | 11 | 12 | 46 | 51 | −5 | 44 |

Source: DFB
Rules for classification: 1) Points; 2) Goal difference; 3) Goals scored; 4) Head-to-head points; 5) Head-to-head goal difference; 6) Head-to-head away goals scored; 7) Away goals scored; 8) Play-off.

==== Results summary ====
| Overall | | | | | | | | Home | | | | | | Away | | | | | |
| Pld | W | D | L | GF | GA | GD | Pts | W | D | L | GF | GA | GD | W | D | L | GF | GA | GD |
|---|---|---|---|---|---|---|---|---|---|---|---|---|---|---|---|---|---|---|---|
| 34 | 12 | 11 | 11 | 53 | 45 | +8 | 47 | 8 | 5 | 4 | 32 | 26 | +6 | 4 | 6 | 7 | 21 | 19 | +2 |

Source: Kicker

==== Results by round ====
| Round | 1 | 2 | 3 | 4 | 5 | 6 | 7 | 8 | 9 | 10 | 11 | 12 | 13 | 14 | 15 | 16 | 17 | 18 | 19 | 20 | 21 | 22 | 23 | 24 | 25 | 26 | 27 | 28 | 29 | 30 | 31 | 32 | 33 | 34 |
|---|---|---|---|---|---|---|---|---|---|---|---|---|---|---|---|---|---|---|---|---|---|---|---|---|---|---|---|---|---|---|---|---|---|---|
| Ground | A | H | A | H | A | H | A | H | A | H | A | H | A | A | H | A | H | H | A | H | A | H | A | H | A | H | A | H | A | H | H | A | H | A |
| Result | L | L | D | W | D | W | W | W | L | L | L | D | W | L | W | D | W | D | L | D | W | D | L | L | W | D | L | W | D | D | W | W | L | D |
| Position | 15 | 16 | 15 | 14 | 14 | 9 | 5 | 3 | 7 | 10 | 12 | 13 | 11 | 13 | 11 | 10 | 10 | 9 | 9 | 10 | 10 | 9 | 10 | 11 | 9 | 10 | 11 | 9 | 9 | 9 | 9 | 8 | 10 | 9 |

Source: Kicker
A = Away; H = Home; W = Win; D = Draw; L = Loss

==== Matches ====
The league fixtures were announced on 7 August 2020.

| 20 September 2020 1 | Holstein Kiel | 1–0 | SC Paderborn | Kiel |
| 13:30 | Mühling 59' | Report | | Stadium: Holstein-Stadion; Attendance: 1,709; Referee: Bastian Dankert |

| 28 September 2020 2 | SC Paderborn | 3–4 | Hamburger SV | Paderborn |
| 20:30 | Srbeny 34' (pen.); Führich 36', 38' | Report | Wintzheimer 14'; Terodde 24', 57'; Hunt 82' (pen.) | Stadium: Benteler-Arena; Attendance: 300; Referee: Guido Winkmann |

| 3 October 2020 3 | 1. FC Heidenheim | 0–0 | SC Paderborn | Heidenheim |
| 13:00 | | Report | | Stadium: Voith-Arena; Attendance: 2,559; Referee: Timo Gerach |

| 18 October 2020 4 | SC Paderborn | 1–0 | Hannover 96 | Paderborn |
| 13:30 | Dörfler 26' | Report | | Stadium: Benteler-Arena; Attendance: 2,258; Referee: Manuel Gräfe |

| 25 October 2020 5 | SV Sandhausen | 1–1 | SC Paderborn | Sandhausen |
| 13:30 | Scheu 37' | Report | Srbeny 28' (pen.) | Stadium: BWT-Stadion am Hardtwald; Attendance: 0 Referee: Benjamin Cortus |

| 31 October 2020 6 | SC Paderborn | 3–1 | Jahn Regensburg | Paderborn |
| 13:00 | Hünemeier 20', 79'; Terrazzino 62' | Report | Albers 23' | Stadium: Benteler-Arena; Attendance: 0 Referee: Sven Jablonski |

| 8 November 2020 7 | SV Darmstadt 98 | 0–4 | SC Paderborn | Darmstadt |
| 13:30 | | Report | Schallenberg 13'; Führich 22'; Srbeny 25', 61' (pen.) | Stadium: Merck-Stadion am Böllenfalltor; Attendance: 0 Referee: Florian Heft |

| 21 November 2020 8 | SC Paderborn | 2–0 | FC St. Pauli | Paderborn |
| 13:00 | Srbeny 39'; Führich 56' | Report | | Stadium: Benteler-Arena; Attendance: 0 Referee: Christian Dingert |

| 28 November 2020 9 | Karlsruher SC | 1–0 | SC Paderborn | Karlsruhe |
| 13:00 | Gordon 7' | Report | | Stadium: Wildparkstadion; Attendance: 0 Referee: Michael Bacher |

| 6 December 2020 10 | SC Paderborn | 0–2 | 1. FC Nürnberg | Paderborn |
| 13:30 | | Report | Hack 8'; Lohkemper 49' | Stadium: Benteler-Arena; Attendance: 0 Referee: Robert Hartmann |

| 11 December 2020 11 | VfL Bochum | 3–0 | SC Paderborn | Bochum |
| 18:30 | Žulj 54', 60' (pen.); Zoller 61' | Report | | Stadium: Ruhrstadion; Attendance: 0 Referee: Tobias Stieler |

| 16 December 2020 12 | SC Paderborn | 2–2 | Eintracht Braunschweig | Paderborn |
| 18:30 | Srbeny 8' (pen.); Führich 19' | Report | Kaufmann 29'; Proschwitz 81' | Stadium: Benteler-Arena; Attendance: 0 Referee: Guido Winkmann |

| 19 December 2020 13 | VfL Osnabrück | 0–1 | SC Paderborn | Osnabrück |
| 13:00 | | Report | Michel 56' | Stadium: Bremer Brücke; Attendance: 0 Referee: Martin Petersen |

| 4 January 2021 14 | Fortuna Düsseldorf | 2–1 | SC Paderborn | Düsseldorf |
| 13:00 | Peterson 22'; Karaman 55' | Report | Führich 79' | Stadium: Merkur Spielarena; Attendance: 0 Referee: Arne Aarnink |

| 10 January 2021 15 | SC Paderborn | 2–1 | Erzgebirge Aue | Paderborn |
| 13:30 | | Report | | Stadium: Benteler-Arena; Attendance: 0 Referee: Martin Thomsen |

| 15 January 2021 16 | SpVgg Greuther Fürth | 1–1 | SC Paderborn | Fürth |
| 18:30 | | Report | | Stadium: Sportpark Ronhof; Attendance: 0 Referee: Matthias Joellenbeck |

| 23 January 2021 17 | SC Paderborn | 1–0 | Würzburger Kickers | Paderborn |
| 13:00 CET (UTC+1) | | | | Stadium: Benteler-Arena; Attendance: 0 Referee: Lasse Koslowski |

| 27 January 2021 18 | SC Paderborn | 1–1 | Holstein Kiel | Paderborn |
| 20:30 CET (UTC+1) | | | | Stadium: Benteler-Arena; Referee: Patrick Ittrich |

| 30 January 2021 19 | Hamburger SV | 3–1 | SC Paderborn | Hamburg |
| 13:00 CET (UTC+1) | | | | Stadium: Volksparkstadion; Referee: Daniel Siebert |

| 12 February 2021 21 | Hannover 96 | 0–0 | SC Paderborn | Hanover |
| 18:30 CET (UTC+1) | | | | Stadium: HDI-Arena; Referee: Tobias Reichel |

| 20 February 2021 22 | SC Paderborn | 2–1 | SV Sandhausen | Paderborn |
| 13:00 CET (UTC+1) | | | | Stadium: Benteler-Arena; Referee: Robert Hartmann |

| 23 February 2021 20 | SC Paderborn | 2–2 | 1. FC Heidenheim | Paderborn |
| 18:30 CET (UTC+1) | | | | Stadium: Benteler-Arena; Referee: Guido Winkmann |

| 26 February 2021 23 | Jahn Regensburg | 1–0 | SC Paderborn | Regensburg |
| 18:30 CET (UTC+1) | | | | Stadium: Jahnstadion Regensburg; Referee: Benjamin Cortus |

| 5 March 2021 24 | SC Paderborn | 2–3 | Darmstadt 98 | Paderborn |
| 18:30 CET (UTC+1) | | | | Stadium: Benteler-Arena |

| 15 March 2021 25 | FC St. Pauli | 0–2 | SC Paderborn | Hamburg |
| 20:30 CET (UTC+1) | | | | Stadium: Millerntor-Stadion |

| 19 March 2021 26 | SC Paderborn | 2–2 | Karlsruher SC | Paderborn |
| 18:30 CET (UTC+1) | | | | Stadium: Benteler-Arena |

| 4 April 2021 27 | 1. FC Nürnberg | 2–1 | SC Paderborn | Nuremberg |
| 13:30 CEST (UTC+2) | | | | Stadium: Max-Morlock-Stadion |

| 10 April 2021 28 | SC Paderborn | 3–0 | VfL Bochum | Paderborn |
| 13:00 CEST (UTC+2) | | | | Stadium: Benteler-Arena |

| 16 April 2021 29 | Eintracht Braunschweig | 0–0 | SC Paderborn | Braunschweig |
| 18:30 CEST (UTC+2) | | | | Stadium: Eintracht-Stadion |

| 21 April 2021 30 | SC Paderborn | 2–2 | VfL Osnabruck | Paderborn |
| 18:30 CEST (UTC+2) | | | | Stadium: Benteler-Arena |

| 24 April 2021 31 | SC Paderborn | 2–1 | Fortuna Düsseldorf | Paderborn |
| 13:00 CEST (UTC+2) | | | | Stadium: Benteler-Arena |

| 9 May 2021 32 | Erzgebirge Aue | 3–8 | SC Paderborn | Würzburg |
| 13:30 CEST (UTC+2) | | | | Stadium: Flyeralarm Arena |

| 16 May 2021 33 | SC Paderborn | 2–4 | Greuther Fürth | Paderborn |
| 15:30 CEST (UTC+2) | | | | Stadium: Benteler-Arena |

| 23 May 2021 34 | Würzburger Kickers | 1–1 | SC Paderborn | Würzburg |
| 15:30 CEST (UTC+2) | | | | Stadium: Flyeralarm Arena |

=== DFB-Pokal ===
| 13 September 2020 First round | SC Wiedenbrück | 0–5 | SC Paderborn | Gütersloh |
| 15:30 CEST (UTC+2) | Maier (yellow card) 8'; Szeleschus (yellow card) 41' | Report | Michel 24'; Srbeny 32', 45+1', 58'; Führich 83' | Stadium: Heidewald Stadion; Attendance: 120; Referee: Frank Willenborg |

| 22 December 2020 Second round | Union Berlin | 2–3 | SC Paderborn | Berlin |
| 20:45 CET (UTC+1) | Prömel 6'; Hünemeier 57' (o.g.) | Report | Michel 3', 36'; Srbeny 31'; Dörfler (yellow card) 63'; Schonlau (yellow card) 90' | Stadium: Stadion An der Alten Försterei; Attendance: 0 Referee: Frank Willenborg |

| 2 February 2021 Round of 16 | Borussia Dortmund | 3–2 (a.e.t.) | SC Paderborn | Dortmund |
| 20:45 CET (UTC+1) | Can 6'; Sancho 16'; Delaney (yellow card) 77'; Haaland 95'; Dahoud (yellow card) 120+3' | Report | Srbeny (yellow card) 51'; Ingelsson (yellow card) 52'; Ananou (yellow card) 75'; Justvan 79'; Owusu 90+7' (pen.); Antwi-Adjei (yellow card) 104' | Stadium: Signal Iduna Park; Attendance: 0 Referee: Tobias Stieler |
