= 2021–22 SC Paderborn 07 season =

SC Paderborn 07
2021–22 season
- President: Elmar Volkmann
- Head coach: Lukas Kwasniok
- Stadium: Benteler-Arena
- 2. Bundesliga: 7th
- DFB-Pokal: First round
colours	colours	colours

The 2021–22 season was the 115th season in the existence of SC Paderborn 07 and the club's second consecutive season in the second division of German football. In addition to the domestic league, SC Paderborn participated in this season's edition of the DFB-Pokal.

== Players ==
=== First-team squad ===
Note: Flags indicate national team as defined under FIFA eligibility rules; some limited exceptions apply. Players may hold more than one non-FIFA nationality.

No.	Pos.	Nation	Player
1	GK	GER	Moritz Schulze
2	DF	GER	Uwe Hünemeier
3	DF	TOG	Frederic Ananou
4	DF	SUI	Jasper van der Werff (on loan from RB Salzburg)
5	MF	GER	Marcel Mehlem
6	MF	GER	Marco Schuster
7	FW	GER	Prince Osei Owusu
8	MF	GER	Ron Schallenberg (captain)
9	MF	GER	Kai Pröger
10	MF	GER	Julian Justvan
11	FW	GER	Sven Michel
12	DF	GER	Jesse Tugbenyo
13	DF	GER	Robin Yalçın
14	MF	GHA	Kelvin Ofori
15	MF	GER	Soufiane El-Faouzi
16	MF	GER	Johannes Dörfler

No.	Pos.	Nation	Player
17	GK	GER	Leopold Zingerle
18	FW	GER	Dennis Srbeny
21	GK	GER	Jannik Huth
22	MF	GER	Marco Stiepermann
23	MF	GER	Maximilian Thalhammer
24	DF	GER	Jannis Heuer
25	DF	POR	Marcel Correia
27	FW	ALB	Marvin Çuni (on loan from Bayern Munich II)
28	DF	GER	Jonas Carls
29	DF	NGR	Jamilu Collins
30	MF	KOS	Florent Muslija
35	MF	GER	Fabrice Hartmann (on loan from RB Leipzig)
36	FW	GER	Felix Platte
38	MF	GER	Adrian Oeynhausen
40	DF	GER	Justus Henke

=== Players out on loan ===
Note: Flags indicate national team as defined under FIFA eligibility rules; some limited exceptions apply. Players may hold more than one non-FIFA nationality.

No.	Pos.	Nation	Player
19	FW	AUS	John Iredale (at SV Wehen Wiesbaden)
—	MF	GER	Luca Marseiler (at Viktoria Köln)

== Pre-season and friendlies ==
Win Draw Loss Fixtures

26 June 2021 Friendly	SC Paderborn (Germany)	5–1	(Germany) SC Verl	Paderborn, Germany
13:00 CEST (UTC+2)				Stadium: Trainings- und Nachwuchsleistungszentrum Platz 4

3 July 2021 Friendly	Hannover 96 (Germany)	1–1	(Germany) SC Paderborn	Hanover, Germany
15:00 CEST (UTC+2)	Muslija 7' (pen.)		Justvan 74'	Stadium: HDI-Arena; Attendance: 0

4 July 2021 Friendly	SC Paderborn (Germany)	2–4	(Germany) Borussia Dortmund II	Germany
13:00 CEST (UTC+2)

10 July 2021 Friendly	Ajax (Netherlands)	4–1	(Germany) SC Paderborn	Oldenzaal, Netherlands
12:00 CEST (UTC+2)	Haller 16'; Kudus 38'; Danilo 57'; Labyad (penalty missed) 78', 78'	Report	Hünemeier 66'	Stadium: Sportpark De Vondersweijde; Referee: Martin van den Kerkhof

14 July 2021 Friendly	SC Paderborn (Germany)	2–1	(Germany) Eintracht Braunschweig	Germany
15:30 CEST (UTC+2)

17 July 2021 Friendly	SC Paderborn (Germany)	3–1	(Germany) Borussia Mönchengladbach	Paderborn, Germany
15:00 CEST (UTC+2)	Hünemeier 13'; Heuer 54'; Srbeny 61'		Noß 58'	Stadium: Benteler-Arena; Attendance: 2,413; Referee: Thorben Siewer

3 September 2021 Friendly	FC Gütersloh (Germany)	2–5	(Germany) SC Paderborn	Gütersloh, Germany
18:00 CEST (UTC+2)	Klantzos 53'; Kording 83'		Dag 2', 76'; Owusu 4', 32', 68'	Stadium: Heidewaldstadion

7 October 2021 Friendly	Borussia Dortmund (Germany)	0–3	(Germany) SC Paderborn	Dortmund, Germany
16:00 CEST (UTC+2)			Platte 78', 89'; Owusu 87'	Stadium: Borussia Dortmund Trainingsgelände; Attendance: 400

10 November 2021 Friendly	1. FC Köln (Germany)	4–0	(Germany) SC Paderborn	Cologne, Germany
13:00 CET (UTC+1)	Schindler 23'; Modeste 34'; Wydra 65'; Kainz 84'			Stadium: Franz-Kremer-Stadion

4 January 2022 Friendly	VfL Wolfsburg (Germany)	5–4	(Germany) SC Paderborn	Wolfsburg, Germany
14:00 CET (UTC+1)	Weghorst 10', 25', 29'; Philipp 22'; Steffen 49'		Platte 34'; Michel 37' (pen.); Yalçın 58'; Pröger 81'	Stadium: AOK Stadion; Attendance: 0 Referee: Robert Schröder

8 January 2022 Friendly	SC Paderborn (Germany)	2–0	(Germany) SC Verl	Paderborn, Germany
12:00 CET (UTC+1)	Srbeny 40'; Platte 86'	Report		Stadium: Benteler-Arena; Referee: Timo Gansloweit

== Competitions ==
=== Overall record ===
Competition	First match	Last match	Starting round	Final position	Record							
Competition	First match	Last match	Starting round	Final position	Pld	W	D	L	GF	GA	GD	Win %
2. Bundesliga	24 July 2021	15 May 2022	Matchday 1	7th	34	13	12	9	56	44	+12	38.24
DFB-Pokal	6 August 2021		First round	First round	1	0	0	1	1	2	−1	0.00
Total					35	13	12	10	57	46	+11	37.14

Source: Soccerway

=== 2. Bundesliga ===
==== League table ====
Pos	Team	Pld	W	D	L	GF	GA	GD	Pts
5	FC St. Pauli	34	16	9	9	61	46	+15	57
6	1. FC Heidenheim	34	15	7	12	43	45	−2	52
7	SC Paderborn	34	13	12	9	56	44	+12	51
8	1. FC Nürnberg	34	14	9	11	49	49	0	51
9	Holstein Kiel	34	12	9	13	46	54	−8	45

Source: DFB
Rules for classification: 1) Points; 2) Goal difference; 3) Goals scored; 4) Head-to-head points; 5) Head-to-head goal difference; 6) Head-to-head away goals scored; 7) Away goals scored; 8) Play-off.

==== Results summary ====
Overall								Home						Away					
Pld	W	D	L	GF	GA	GD	Pts	W	D	L	GF	GA	GD	W	D	L	GF	GA	GD
34	13	12	9	56	44	+12	51	4	7	6	26	24	+2	9	5	3	30	20	+10

Source: DFB

==== Results by round ====
Round	1	2	3	4	5	6	7	8	9	10	11	12	13	14	15	16	17	18	19	20	21	22	23	24	25	26	27	28	29	30	31	32	33	34
Ground	A	H	A	H	A	H	A	H	A	H	H	A	H	A	H	A	H	H	A	H	A	H	A	H	A	H	A	A	H	A	H	A	H	A
Result	D	D	W	W	W	L	W	L	W	D	L	W	W	D	D	D	L	L	W	L	D	D	L	D	W	D	L	W	D	W	W	D	W	L
Position	9	11	5	3	2	2	1	4	3	4	5	4	3	3	4	4	6	9	8	9	8	8	8	8	8	8	8	8	8	8	7	7	6	7

Source: DFB
A = Away; H = Home; W = Win; D = Draw; L = Loss

==== Matches ====
The league fixtures were announced on 25 June 2021.

24 July 2021 1	1. FC Heidenheim	0–0	SC Paderborn	Heidenheim
13:30 CEST (UTC+2)				Stadium: Voith-Arena; Referee: Michael Bacher

30 July 2021 2	SC Paderborn	2–2	1. FC Nürnberg	Paderborn
18:30 CEST (UTC+2)	Heuer 18'; Michel 85'		Dæhli 54'; Schäffler 58'	Stadium: Benteler-Arena; Referee: Sven Jablonski

15 August 2021 3	Werder Bremen	1–4	SC Paderborn	Bremen
13:30 CEST (UTC+2)	Schmidt 52'		Platte 9', 17'; Michel 36'; Schallenberg 55'	Stadium: Weserstadion; Referee: Martin Petersen

21 August 2021 4	SC Paderborn	3–1	FC St. Pauli	Paderborn
13:30 CEST (UTC+2)				Stadium: Benteler-Arena

29 August 2021 5	Dynamo Dresden	0–3	SC Paderborn	Dresden
13:30 CEST (UTC+2)			Michel 8'; Pröger 24', 26'	Stadium: Rudolf-Harbig-Stadion

12 September 2021 6	SC Paderborn	0–1	Schalke 04	Paderborn
13:30 CEST (UTC+2)			Terodde	Stadium: Benteler-Arena

19 September 2021 7	Erzgebirge Aue	1–4	SC Paderborn	Aue
13:30 CEST (UTC+2)	Gueye 51'		Stiepermann 4', 48'; Michel 26'; Platte 38'	Stadium: Erzgebirgsstadion

25 September 2021 8	SC Paderborn	1–2	Holstein Kiel	Paderborn
13:30 CEST (UTC+2)	Porath; Joshua Mees		Michel	Stadium: Benteler-Arena

3 October 2021 9	Fortuna Düsseldorf	2–3	SC Paderborn	Düsseldorf
13:30 CEST (UTC+2)				Stadium: Merkur Spiel-Arena

15 October 2021 10	SC Paderborn	1–1	Jahn Regensburg	Paderborn
18:30 CEST (UTC+2)				Stadium: Benteler-Arena

22 October 2021 11	SC Paderborn	1–2	Hamburger SV	Paderborn
18:30 CEST (UTC+2)				Stadium: Benteler-Arena

31 October 2021 12	Karlsruher SC	2–4	SC Paderborn	Karlsruhe
13:30 CET (UTC+1)				Stadium: Wildparkstadion

6 November 2021 13	SC Paderborn	2–1	FC Ingolstadt	Paderborn
13:30 CET (UTC+1)				Stadium: Benteler-Arena

19 November 2021 14	Hannover 96	0–0	SC Paderborn	Hanover
13:30 CET (UTC+1)				Stadium: HDI-Arena

28 November 2021 15	SC Paderborn	1–1	Hansa Rostock	Paderborn
13:30 CET (UTC+1)				Stadium: Benteler-Arena

4 December 2021 16	SV Sandhausen	1–1	SC Paderborn	Sandhausen
13:30 CET (UTC+1)				Stadium: BWT-Stadion am Hardtwald

11 December 2021 17	SC Paderborn	0–1	Darmstadt 98	Paderborn
20:30 CET (UTC+1)				Stadium: Benteler-Arena

18 December 2021 18	SC Paderborn	1–2	1. FC Heidenheim	Paderborn
13:30 CET (UTC+1)				Stadium: Benteler-Arena

15 January 2022 19	1. FC Nürnberg	1–2	SC Paderborn	Nuremberg
13:30 CET (UTC+1)				Stadium: Max-Morlock-Stadion

22 January 2022 20	SC Paderborn	3–4	Werder Bremen	Paderborn
13:30 CET (UTC+1)				Stadium: Benteler-Arena

5 February 2022 21	FC St. Pauli	2–2	SC Paderborn	St. Pauli
13:30 CET (UTC+1)				Stadium: Millerntor-Stadion

12 February 2022 22	SC Paderborn	0–0	Dynamo Dresden	Paderborn
13:30 CET (UTC+1)				Stadium: Benteler-Arena; Referee: Sven Jablonski

18 February 2022 23	Schalke 04	2–0	SC Paderborn	Gelsenkirchen
18:30 CET (UTC+1)	Bülter 22'; Churlinov 74'			Stadium: Veltins-Arena; Referee: Florian Badstübner

25 February 2022 24	SC Paderborn	3–3	Erzgebirge Aue	Paderborn
18:30 CET (UTC+1)				Stadium: Benteler-Arena; Referee: Thorben Siewer

4 March 2022 25	Holstein Kiel	3–4	SC Paderborn	Kiel
18:30 CET (UTC+1)				Stadium: Holstein-Stadion; Referee: Patrick Hanselbauer

12 March 2022 26	SC Paderborn	1–1	Fortuna Düsseldorf	Paderborn
13:30 CET (UTC+1)				Stadium: Benteler-Arena; Referee: Michael Bacher

20 March 2022 27	Jahn Regensburg	1–0	SC Paderborn	Regensburg
13:30 CET (UTC+1)				Stadium: Jahnstadion Regensburg; Attendance: 7,680; Referee: Martin Petersen

2 April 2022 28	Hamburger SV	1–2	SC Paderborn	Hamburg
13:30 CEST (UTC+2)				Stadium: Volksparkstadion; Attendance: 27,136; Referee: Martin Thomsen

10 April 2022 29	SC Paderborn	2–2	Karlsruher SC	Paderborn
13:30 CEST (UTC+2)				Stadium: Benteler-Arena; Attendance: 9,652; Referee: Christof Günsch

17 April 2022 30	FC Ingolstadt	0–1	SC Paderborn	Ingolstadt
13:30 CEST (UTC+2)				Stadium: Audi Sportpark

24 April 2022 31	SC Paderborn	3–0	Hannover 96	Paderborn
13:30 CEST (UTC+2)				Stadium: Benteler-Arena

30 April 2022 32	Hansa Rostock	0–0	Werder Bremen	Rostock
13:30 CEST (UTC+2)				Stadium: Ostseestadion

6 May 2022 33	SC Paderborn	2–0	SV Sandhausen	Paderborn
18:30 CEST (UTC+2)				Stadium: Benteler-Arena

15 May 2022 34	Darmstadt 98	3–0	SC Paderborn	Darmstadt
15:30 CEST (UTC+2)				Stadium: Merck-Stadion am Böllenfalltor

=== DFB-Pokal ===
6 August 2021 First round	Dynamo Dresden	2–1	SC Paderborn	Dresden
20:45 CEST (UTC+2)	Knipping 54'; Kade 88'	Report	Michel 60'	Stadium: Rudolf-Harbig-Stadion; Attendance: 12,702; Referee: Christof Günsch
