= Ron Schallenberg =

German footballer (born 1998)

Personal information
- Date of birth: 6 October 1998 (age 28)
- Place of birth: Paderborn, Germany
- Height: 1.85 m (6 ft 1 in)
- Position: Defensive midfielder

Team information
- Current team: Schalke 04
- Number: 6

Youth career
- 2001–2009: SV Marienloh
- 2009–2016: SC Paderborn

Senior career*
Years	Team	Apps	(Gls)
2016–2018	SC Paderborn II	41	(0)
2017–2023	SC Paderborn	95	(7)
2018–2020	→ SC Verl (loan)	48	(8)
2023–	Schalke 04	91	(3)
- * Club domestic league appearances and goals as of 31 August 2026

Ron Schallenberg (born 6 October 1998) is a German professional footballer who plays as a defensive midfielder for Bundesliga club Schalke 04.

== Career ==
=== SC Paderborn ===
Schallenberg made his debut for SC Paderborn in the first round of the 2020–21 DFB-Pokal on 13 September 2020, coming on as a substitute in the 36th minute for Sebastian Vasiliadis against fourth-division side SC Wiedenbrück, which finished as a 5–0 away win. He made his 2. Bundesliga debut for the club on 28 September 2020, coming on as a substitute in the 73rd minute for Julian Justvan against Hamburger SV, which finished as a 4–3 home loss.

=== Schalke 04 ===
On 19 June 2023, Schallenberg agreed to join Schalke 04, newly relegated from the Bundesliga, signing a three-year contract.

== Career statistics ==
As of match played 30 August 2026

Appearances and goals by club, season and competition
Club	Season	League			DFB-Pokal		Other		Total	
Club	Season	Division	Apps	Goals	Apps	Goals	Apps	Goals	Apps	Goals
SC Paderborn II	2016–17	Oberliga Westfalen	21	0	—		—		21	0
SC Paderborn II	2017–18	Oberliga Westfalen	20	0	—		—		20	0
SC Paderborn II	Total		41	0	—		—		41	0
SC Verl (loan)	2018–19	Regionalliga West	27	4	—		—		27	4
SC Verl (loan)	2019–20	Regionalliga West	21	4	3	1	2 (Note: Appearances in 3. Liga promotion play-offs)	1	26	6
SC Verl (loan)	Total		48	8	3	1	2	1	53	10
SC Paderborn	2020–21	2. Bundesliga	31	1	3	0	—		34	1
SC Paderborn	2021–22	2. Bundesliga	31	3	1	0	—		32	3
SC Paderborn	2022–23	2. Bundesliga	33	3	2	0	—		35	3
SC Paderborn	Total		95	7	6	0	—		101	7
Schalke 04	2023–24	2. Bundesliga	26	0	2	0	—		28	0
Schalke 04	2024–25	2. Bundesliga	31	3	1	0	—		32	3
Schalke 04	2025–26	2. Bundesliga	33	0	1	0	—		34	0
Schalke 04	2026–27	Bundesliga	1	0	1	0	—		2	0
Schalke 04	Total		91	3	5	0	—		96	3
Career total			275	18	14	1	2	1	291	20

== Honours ==
Schalke 04

- 2. Bundesliga: 2025–26
