= Sven Michel =

Sven Michel may refer to:

- Sven Michel (curler) (born 1988), Swiss curler
- Sven Michel (footballer) (born 1990), German footballer
