= John Iredale =

Australian association football player

Personal information
- Full name: John Warwick Iredale
- Date of birth: 1 August 1999 (age 27)
- Place of birth: Sydney, Australia
- Height: 1.88 m (6 ft 2 in)
- Position: Striker

Team information
- Current team: Gwangju FC
- Number: 18

Youth career
- West Pennant Hills Cherrybrook
- NWS Spirit
- Marconi Stallions
- Blacktown City
- NSWIS
- 2015–2017: Sydney FC
- 2017–2019: SC Heerenveen

Senior career*
Years	Team	Apps	(Gls)
2017	Sydney FC	0	(0)
2019–2021	VfL Wolfsburg II	21	(15)
2021–2022	SC Paderborn	0	(0)
2021–2022	→ SV Wehen Wiesbaden (loan)	12	(3)
2022–2024	SV Wehen Wiesbaden	55	(9)
2024	AaB	14	(3)
2025–2026	Seoul E-Land FC	26	(9)
2026–	Gwangju FC	14	(5)

International career^{‡}
2018	Australia U20	2	(0)
2021	Australia U23	2	(0)
2024–	Australia	2	(1)
- * Club domestic league appearances and goals as of 22 September 2026 ‡ National team caps and goals as of 26 March 2024

John Warwick Iredale (born 1 August 1999) is an Australian professional soccer player who plays as a striker for K League 1 club Gwangju FC and the Australia national team.

== Early life ==
Iredale grew up in Cherrybrook, attending Cherrybrook Public School and Oakhill College.

== Club career ==
Iredale is a youth academy graduate of Sydney FC. He made his senior debut for the club on 2 August 2017 in a 8–0 cup win against Darwin Rovers.

On 26 August 2021, SV Wehen Wiesbaden announced the signing of Iredale on a season long loan deal. He made his professional debut for the club on 28 August in a 4–2 league defeat against 1. FC Magdeburg. On 2 August 2022, he joined the club on a permanent basis by signing a two-year contract.

On 8 July 2024, Iredale joined Danish Superliga club AaB.

On 7 January 2025, Iredale joined Seoul E-Land FC.

On 10 June 2026, Iredale joined Gwangju FC.

== International career ==
John Iredale is a former Australian youth international. He was member of the team which reached quarter-finals at the 2018 AFC U-19 Championship. On 30 August 2018, he received his first call-up to the senior team for a training camp which was held in Turkey.

In December 2023, Iredale was included in his first ever Socceroos squad, being named in Australia's 26-man team for the 2023 AFC Asian Cup. However, he remained as an unused substitute throughout Australia's Asian Cup campaign, with the Socceroos falling short to South Korea 2–1 in the quarter finals.

On 21 March 2024, Iredale made his international debut in a 2–0 win against Lebanon, coming on for Adam Taggart in the 67th minute. He proceeded to score his first international goal five days later against the same opponent, this time with the match ending in a 5–0 win for Australia.

== Career statistics ==
=== Club ===
As of 1 November 2026

Appearances and goals by club, season and competition
Club	Season	League			Cup		Other		Total	
Club	Season	Division	Apps	Goals	Apps	Goals	Apps	Goals	Apps	Goals
Sydney FC	2017–18	A-League	0	0	1	0	—		1	0
VfL Wolfsburg II	2019–20	Regionalliga Nord	13	10	—		—		13	10
VfL Wolfsburg II	2020–21	Regionalliga Nord	8	5	—		—		8	5
VfL Wolfsburg II	Total		21	15	0	0	0	0	21	15
SC Paderborn	2021–22	2. Bundesliga	0	0	0	0	—		0	0
SC Paderborn	2022–23	2. Bundesliga	0	0	0	0	—		0	0
SC Paderborn	Total		0	0	0	0	0	0	0	0
SV Wehen Wiesbaden (loan)	2021–22	3. Liga	12	3	0	0	—		12	3
SV Wehen Wiesbaden	2022–23	3. Liga	32	6	0	0	4 (Note: Two Appearances in the Hessian Cup and in the 2022–23 2. Bundesliga Relegation play-offs)	2	36	8
SV Wehen Wiesbaden	2023–24	2. Bundesliga	23	3	0	0	1 (Note: Appearance in the 2023–24 2. Bundesliga Relegation play-offs)	1	24	4
SV Wehen Wiesbaden	Total		55	9	0	0	5	3	60	12
AaB	2024–25	Danish Superliga	14	3	3	1	—		17	4
Seoul E-Land	2025	K League 2	27	10	0	0	1 (Note: Appearance in the 2025 K League promotion play-offs)	0	28	10
Seoul E-Land	2026	K League 2	4	2	—		—		4	2
Seoul E-Land	Total		31	12	0	0	1	0	32	12
Gwangju	2026	K League 1	18	11	0	0	0	0	18	11
Career total			151	53	4	1	6	2	161	56

=== International ===
As of match played 26 March 2024

Appearances and goals by national team and year
National team	Year	Apps	Goals
Australia	2024	2	1
Total		2	1

Scores and results list Australia's goal tally first, score column indicates score after each Iredale goal.

List of international goals scored by John Iredale
No.	Date	Venue	Opponent	Score	Result	Competition
1	26 March 2024	Canberra Stadium, Canberra, Australia	Lebanon	4–0	5–0	2026 FIFA World Cup qualification
