= Uwe Hünemeier =

German footballer

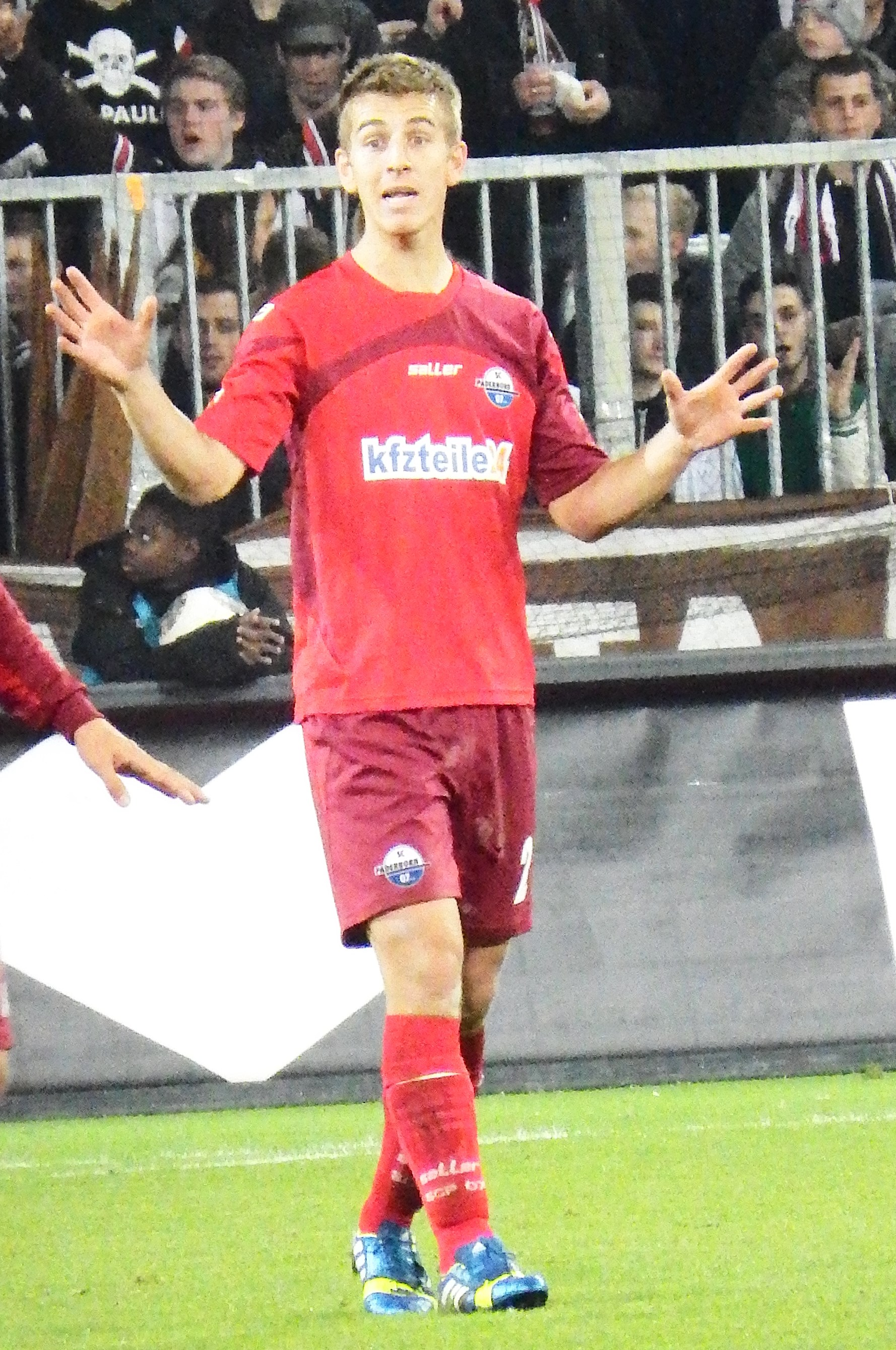
- Hünemeier playing for SC Paderborn in 2013

Personal information
- Full name: Uwe Hünemeier
- Date of birth: 9 January 1986 (age 40)
- Place of birth: Gütersloh, Germany
- Height: 1.88 m (6 ft 2 in)
- Position: Centre back

Youth career
- 1992–1997: DJK Bokel
- 1997–2000: FC Gütersloh
- 2000–2004: Borussia Dortmund

Senior career*
Years	Team	Apps	(Gls)
2004–2010	Borussia Dortmund II	130	(13)
2005–2010	Borussia Dortmund	5	(0)
2010–2013	Energie Cottbus	78	(10)
2013–2015	SC Paderborn	67	(4)
2015–2018	Brighton & Hove Albion	27	(1)
2018–2023	SC Paderborn	115	(4)
Total		422	(32)

International career
2003	Germany U17	3	(0)
- * Club domestic league appearances and goals

Uwe Hünemeier (born 9 January 1986) is a German former professional footballer who played as a centre back.

== Club career ==
Born in Gütersloh, North Rhine-Westphalia, Hünemeier began with the football team at DJK Bokel. Because of its benefits other clubs wanted to sign him and Hünemeier joined the youth of FC Gütersloh 2000. He also appeared in relation to his performance positively in appearance and in 2000, he joined the youth of Borussia Dortmund. In 2004, he came to the second team of the club. A year later, he was awarded a professional contract and now belonged to the first team.

He made his debut for the senior Borussia Dortmund squad on 17 December 2005, when he started in a Bundesliga game against Bayern Munich and played the whole 90 minutes.

Hünemeier signed for Brighton & Hove Albion in August 2015. He scored his first goal for Brighton in a 3–1 win over Birmingham City on 4 April 2017. Brighton finished the season as runners up, and gained automatic promotion to the Premier League.

With Brighton promoted to the Premier League for the 2017–18 season, Hünemeier assumed the role of back-up centre defender with Lewis Dunk and Shane Duffy forming Brighton's established centre-back partnership. He made his Premier League debut as a substitute against Everton in a 1–1 draw on 15 October 2017, coming on for the injured Duffy.

In May 2018, Paderborn announced Hünemeier would return to the club for the new season, having signed a contract until summer 2020.

== International career ==
Hünemeier made three appearances for the German U17s.

== Career statistics ==
Appearances and goals by club, season and competition
Club	Season	League			National cup (Note: Appearances in German FA Cup and English FA Cup.)		League cup (Note: Appearances in English League Cup)		Other		Total		Ref.
Club	Season	League	Apps	Goals	Apps	Goals	Apps	Goals	Apps	Goals	Apps	Goals	Ref.
Borussia Dortmund II	2004–05	Regionalliga Nord	11	0	—		—		—		11	0	
Borussia Dortmund II	2006–07	Regionalliga Nord	27	1	—		—		—		27	1	
Borussia Dortmund II	2007–08	Regionalliga Nord	36	3	—		—		—		36	3	
Borussia Dortmund II	2008–09	Regionalliga West	23	3	—		—		—		23	3	
Borussia Dortmund II	2009–10	3. Liga	33	6	—		—		—		33	6	
Borussia Dortmund II	Total		130	13	0	0	0	0	0	0	130	13	—
Borussia Dortmund	2005–06	Bundesliga	2	0	0	0	—		0	0	2	0	
Borussia Dortmund	2006–07	Bundesliga	1	0	0	0	—		0	0	1	0	
Borussia Dortmund	2008–09	Bundesliga	1	0	0	0	—		0	0	1	0	
Borussia Dortmund	2009–10	Bundesliga	1	0	0	0	—		0	0	1	0	
Borussia Dortmund	Total		5	0	0	0	0	0	0	0	5	0	—
Energie Cottbus	2010–11	2. Bundesliga	30	9	4	0	—		—		34	9	
Energie Cottbus	2011–12	2. Bundesliga	25	1	1	0	—		—		26	1	
Energie Cottbus	2012–13	2. Bundesliga	23	0	1	0	—		—		24	0	
Energie Cottbus	Total		78	10	6	0	0	0	0	0	84	10	—
SC Paderborn	2013–14	2. Bundesliga	33	2	2	0	—		—		35	2	
SC Paderborn	2014–15	Bundesliga	32	2	1	0	—		—		33	2	
SC Paderborn	2015–16	2. Bundesliga	2	0	1	0	—		—		3	0	
SC Paderborn	Total		67	4	4	0	0	0	0	0	71	4	—
Brighton & Hove Albion	2015–16	Championship	15	0	0	0	0	0	2 (Note: Appearance in Championship play-offs)	0	17	0	
Brighton & Hove Albion	2016–17	Championship	11	1	2	0	2	0	0	0	15	1	
Brighton & Hove Albion	2017–18	Premier League	1	0	3	0	2	0	0	0	6	0	
Brighton & Hove Albion	Total		27	1	5	0	4	0	2	0	38	1	—
SC Paderborn	2018–19	2. Bundesliga	22	1	4	3	—		—		26	4	
SC Paderborn	2019–20	Bundesliga	16	1	1	1	—		—		17	2	
SC Paderborn	2020–21	2. Bundesliga	26	2	2	0	—		—		28	2	
SC Paderborn	2021–22	2. Bundesliga	29	0	1	0	—		—		30	0	
SC Paderborn	2022–23	2. Bundesliga	22	0	3	0	—		—		25	0	
SC Paderborn	2023–24	2. Bundesliga	0	0	0	0	—		—		0	0	
SC Paderborn	Total		115	4	11	4	0	0	0	0	126	8	—
Career total			422	32	26	4	4	0	2	0	454	36	—

== Honours ==
Borussia Dortmund ll

- Regionalliga West: 2008–09 Regionalliga

SC Paderborn

- 2.Bundesliga runner-up: 2013–14

Brighton & Hove Albion

- EFL Championship runner-up: 2016–17
