= Dennis Srbeny =

German footballer (born 1994)

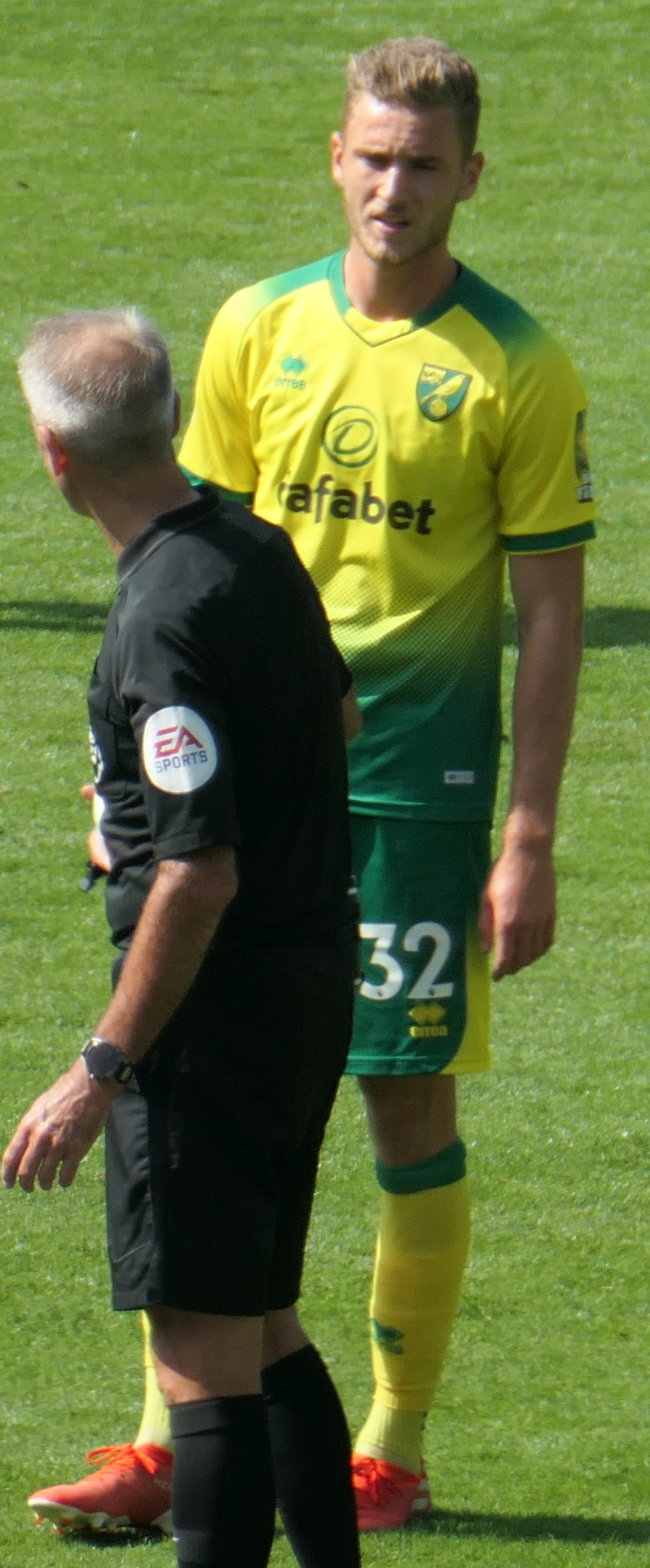
- Srbeny playing for Norwich City

Personal information
- Full name: Dennis Srbeny
- Date of birth: 5 May 1994 (age 32)
- Place of birth: Berlin, Germany
- Position: Forward

Team information
- Current team: Greuther Fürth
- Number: 7

Youth career
- 2008–2011: Tennis Borussia Berlin
- 2011–2013: Hertha Zehlendorf

Senior career*
Years	Team	Apps	(Gls)
2013–2015	Hansa Rostock II	34	(13)
2014–2015	Hansa Rostock	20	(1)
2015–2017	BFC Dynamo	55	(28)
2017–2018	SC Paderborn	15	(9)
2018–2020	Norwich City	37	(3)
2020–2023	SC Paderborn	116	(29)
2023–	Greuther Fürth	86	(8)
- * Club domestic league appearances and goals as of 18 May 2026

Dennis Srbeny (born 5 May 1994) is a German professional footballer who plays as a forward for 2. Bundesliga club Greuther Fürth.

== Career ==
=== SC Paderborn ===
Srbeny joined 3. Liga side SC Paderborn in summer 2017 from BFC Dynamo. He spent six months with the club, scoring 9 goals and making 8 assists in 15 league appearances.

=== Norwich City ===
On 25 January 2018, Srbeny signed for Championship side Norwich City on a two-and-a-half-year deal for an undisclosed fee. He scored his first league goal for Norwich on 7 April 2018, against Aston Villa in a 3–1 win at Carrow Road.

=== Return to SC Paderborn ===
On 8 January 2020, SC Paderborn announced that Srbeny would return to the club on a two-and-a-half-year deal.

On 9 May 2021, Srbeny scored a brace in SC Paderborn's 8–3 away win against Erzgebirge Aue, which was also the highest scoring game in the 2. Bundesliga for the 2020–21 season.

Srbeny made 38 appearances and scored 20 goals for SC Paderborn in the 2020–21 season.

== Career statistics ==
As of match played 1 July 2023

Appearances and goals by club, season and competition
Club	Season	League			National cup		League cup		Other		Total	
Club	Season	Division	Apps	Goals	Apps	Goals	Apps	Goals	Apps	Goals	Apps	Goals
Hansa Rostock	2013–14	3. Liga	2	0	—		—		—		2	0
Hansa Rostock	2014–15	3. Liga	18	1	—		—		—		18	1
Hansa Rostock	Total		20	1	0	0	—		0	0	20	1
BFC Dynamo	2015–16	Regionalliga Nordost	22	10	0	0	—		—		22	10
BFC Dynamo	2016–17	Regionalliga Nordost	33	18	—		—		—		33	18
BFC Dynamo	Total		55	28	0	0	—		0	0	55	28
SC Paderborn	2017–18	3. Liga	15	9	3	0	—		—		18	9
Norwich City	2017–18	Championship	14	1	—		—		—		14	1
Norwich City	2018–19	Championship	15	1	1	0	4	2	—		20	3
Norwich City	2019–20	Premier League	8	1	0	0	1	0	—		9	1
Norwich City	Total		37	3	1	0	5	2	0	0	43	5
SC Paderborn	2019–20	Bundesliga	17	5	—		—		—		17	5
SC Paderborn	2020–21	2. Bundesliga	34	16	3	4	—		—		37	20
SC Paderborn	2021–22	2. Bundesliga	32	4	1	0	—		0	0	33	4
SC Paderborn	2022–23	2. Bundesliga	33	4	2	1	—		0	0	35	5
SC Paderborn	Total		116	29	6	5	0	0	0	0	122	34
Career total			243	70	10	5	5	2	0	0	258	77

== Honours ==
Norwich City

- EFL Championship: 2018–19
