= Jamilu Collins =

Nigerian footballer (born 1994)

Personal information
- Date of birth: 5 August 1994 (age 32)
- Place of birth: Kaduna, Nigeria
- Height: 1.83 m (6 ft 0 in)
- Position: Left-back

Team information
- Current team: SV Tasmania Berlin
- Number: 15

Youth career
- –2012: Abuja Football College Academy
- 2012–2013: Rijeka

Senior career*
Years	Team	Apps	(Gls)
2012–2017	Rijeka	0	(0)
2013–2014	→ Pomorac (loan)	29	(0)
2014–2015	→ Rijeka II	24	(0)
2015	→ Krka (loan)	13	(0)
2016	→ Šibenik (loan)	14	(0)
2016–2017	→ Istra 1961 (loan)	11	(0)
2017	→ Šibenik (loan)	12	(2)
2017–2022	SC Paderborn	127	(2)
2022–2025	Cardiff City	43	(1)
2025–2026	Erzgebirge Aue	21	(0)
2026–	SV Tasmania Berlin	6	(1)

International career^{‡}
2018–	Nigeria	29	(0)
Medal record
Africa Cup of Nations
Third place	2019 Egypt
- * Club domestic league appearances and goals as of 23 September 2026 ‡ National team caps and goals as of 22:55, 26 March 2024 (UTC)

Jamilu Collins (born 5 August 1994) is a Nigerian professional footballer who plays as a left-back for Regionalliga Nordost club SV Tasmania Berlin and the Nigeria national team.

== Club career ==
=== Rijeka and loans ===
Born in Kaduna, Collins spent his youth years with Abuja Football College Academy. He was one of several players who moved from Abuja to the Rijeka youth team in mid-2012. In October 2012, Collins signed his first professional contract with Rijeka.

In August 2013, he was loaned to NK Pomorac in Druga HNL, where he collected 29 caps. In the following season, he played for HNK Rijeka's reserve side in Croatia's Treća HNL, where he was capped on 24 occasions. In May 2015, he signed a new one-year contract with the club, with an option to extend it for an additional year.

In June 2015, Rijeka sent Collins on loan to Krka in the Slovenian PrvaLiga, where he made 13 appearances before returning to Rijeka in January 2016. The following month, Collins was loaned to Sibenik in Druga HNL, where he was a regular starter. Following return from the loan, Rijeka extended Collins' contract until June 2017. He was immediately loaned to fellow Prva HNL club Istra 1961.

=== SC Paderborn ===
On 6 September 2017, free agent Collins joined 3. Liga side SC Paderborn on a two-year contract following trials at the club. He scored his first goal for the club two years later with a 35-yard shot against Bayern Munich in a 3–2 defeat.

=== Cardiff City ===
On 20 May 2022, Collins signed for EFL Championship team Cardiff City. Collins said “I’m really excited to be in Cardiff, and I can’t wait to get started. The Club has great history, and when I got the call to come to Cardiff, I was so excited, I couldn’t resist. I’m looking forward to the challenge of the new season. The goal is to fight for the Premier League. I can’t wait to meet the supporters and to fight for the jersey."

On 7 June 2024, the club announced it had extended the player's contract. Collins left the club at the end of the 2024–2025 season.

=== Later career ===
Collins moved to Regionalliga Nordost club SV Tasmania Berlin in August 2026, signing a two-year contract.

== International career ==
Collins received his first call-up to the Nigeria national team for an Africa Cup of Nations qualification match against Seychelles on 11 September 2018. He made his debut a day later in a friendly against Liberia. Coach Gernot Rohr handed the 24-year-old his competitive debut in the next Afcon qualifying fixture against Libya in Uyo. Nigeria defeated the visitors 4–0 and the left-back came close to marking his Super Eagles debut with a goal. He featured in the reverse fixture in Sfax, Tunisia, which ended in a 3–2 victory for Nigeria to top Group E.

On 25 December 2021, he was shortlisted in 2021 AFCON Nations Cup by caretaker coach Eguavoen as part of the 28-man Nigeria squad.

== Career statistics ==
=== Club ===
As of match played 1 August 2025

Appearances and goals by club, season and competition
Club	Season	League			National cup		League cup		Other		Total	
Club	Season	Division	Apps	Goals	Apps	Goals	Apps	Goals	Apps	Goals	Apps	Goals
Rijeka	2013–14	1. HNL	0	0	0	0	—		—		0	0
Rijeka	2014–15	1. HNL	0	0	0	0	—		—		0	0
Rijeka	2015–16	1. HNL	0	0	0	0	—		—		0	0
Rijeka	2016–17	1. HNL	0	0	0	0	—		—		0	0
Rijeka	Total		0	0	0	0	—		—		0	0
Pomorac (loan)	2013–14	2. HNL	29	0	1	0	—		—		30	0
Rijeka II	2014–15	3. HNL	24	0	—		—		—		24	0
Krka (loan)	2015–16	Slovenian PrvaLiga	13	0	1	0	—		—		14	0
Šibenik (loan)	2015–16	2. HNL	14	0	0	0	—		—		14	0
Istra 1961 (loan)	2016–17	1. HNL	11	0	1	0	—		—		12	0
Šibenik (loan)	2016–17	2. HNL	12	2	0	0	—		—		12	2
SC Paderborn	2017–18	3. Liga	19	0	1	0	—		—		20	0
SC Paderborn	2018–19	2. Bundesliga	34	0	4	0	—		—		38	0
SC Paderborn	2019–20	Bundesliga	30	1	2	0	—		—		32	1
SC Paderborn	2020–21	2. Bundesliga	24	0	1	0	—		—		25	0
SC Paderborn	2021–22	2. Bundesliga	20	1	1	0	—		—		21	1
SC Paderborn	Total		127	2	9	0	—		—		136	2
Cardiff City	2022–23	EFL Championship	4	0	0	0	0	0	—		4	0
Cardiff City	2023–24	EFL Championship	36	1	0	0	1	0	—		37	1
Cardiff City	2024–25	EFL Championship	3	0	0	0	0	0	—		3	0
Cardiff City	Total		43	1	0	0	1	0	0	0	44	1
Career total			273	5	12	0	1	0	0	0	286	5

=== International ===
As of matches played on 26 March 2024

Appearances and goals by national team and year
National team	Year	Apps	Goals
Nigeria	2018	4	0
Nigeria	2019	10	0
Nigeria	2020	1	0
Nigeria	2021	9	0
Nigeria	2022	1	0
Nigeria	2023	2	0
Nigeria	2024	2	0
Total		29	0
