= Marcel Hoffmeier =

German footballer

Personal information
- Date of birth: 15 July 1999 (age 27)
- Place of birth: Geseke, Germany
- Height: 1.80 m (5 ft 11 in)
- Positions: Centre-back; midfielder

Team information
- Current team: SC Paderborn
- Number: 33

Youth career
- –2009: Rot-Weiß Horn
- 2009–2018: SV Lippstadt

Senior career*
Years	Team	Apps	(Gls)
2018–2019	SV Lippstadt	44	(3)
2019–2022	Preußen Münster	71	(5)
2022–	SC Paderborn	89	(2)
- * Club domestic league appearances and goals as of 27 December 2025

Marcel Hoffmeier (born 15 July 1999) is a German professional footballer who plays as a centre-back or midfielder for Bundesliga club SC Paderborn.

== Career ==
Hoffmeier started his career at Lippstadt club Rot-Weiß Horn and moved to the youth team of SV Lippstadt in 2009, where he also made his first appearances in the men's division in the Regionalliga West and Oberliga Westfalen in the 2018–19 season. For the 2019–20 season, he moved to 3. Liga team Preußen Münster, where he had his first professional appearance in an away 4–2 defeat at FSV Zwickau.

On 4 June 2022, Hoffmeier signed with SC Paderborn.

== Career statistics ==
As of match played 29 August 2025

Appearances and goals by club, season and competition
Club	Season	League			DFB-Pokal		Other		Total	
Club	Season	Division	Apps	Goals	Apps	Goals	Apps	Goals	Apps	Goals
SV Lippstadt	2017–18	Oberliga Westfalen	11	0	—		1 (Note: Appearance in DFB-Pokal qualification)	1	12	1
SV Lippstadt	2018–19	Regionalliga West	33	3	—		3 (Note: Appearance(s) in Westphalian Cup)	1	36	4
SV Lippstadt	Total		44	3	—		4	2	48	5
Preußen Münster	2019–20	3. Liga	2	0	—		1	0	3	0
Preußen Münster	2020–21	Regionalliga West	33	2	—		2	0	35	2
Preußen Münster	2021–22	Regionalliga West	36	3	2	1	4	1	42	5
Preußen Münster	Total		71	5	2	1	7	1	80	7
SC Paderborn	2022–23	2. Bundesliga	32	1	3	0	—		35	1
SC Paderborn	2023–24	2. Bundesliga	32	0	2	0	—		34	0
SC Paderborn	2024–25	2. Bundesliga	21	0	2	0	—		23	0
SC Paderborn	2025–26	2. Bundesliga	4	1	1	0	—		5	1
SC Paderborn	2026–27	Bundesliga	0	0	0	0	—		0	0
SC Paderborn	Total		89	2	8	0	—		97	2
Career total			204	10	10	1	11	3	225	14
