= Florent Muslija =

Kosovan footballer (born 1998)

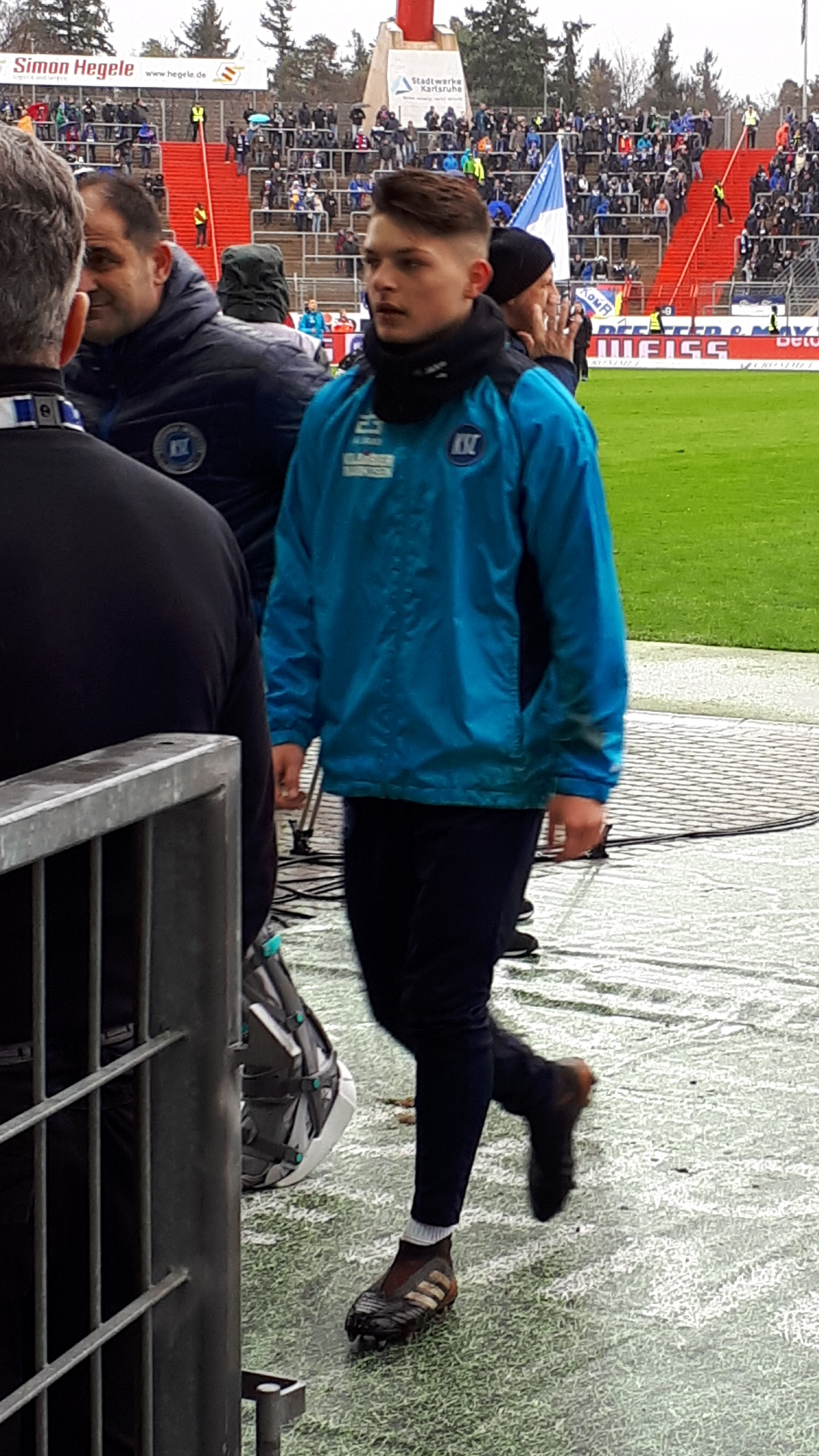
- Muslija with Karlsruher SC in 2018

Personal information
- Date of birth: 6 July 1998 (age 28)
- Place of birth: Achern, Germany
- Height: 1.72 m (5 ft 8 in)
- Position: Midfielder

Team information
- Current team: SC Freiburg
- Number: 23

Youth career
- 2004–2007: SV Sasbach
- 2007–2017: Karlsruher SC

Senior career*
Years	Team	Apps	(Gls)
2017–2018	Karlsruher SC	43	(2)
2018–2022	Hannover 96	76	(9)
2022–2024	SC Paderborn	65	(23)
2024–	SC Freiburg	19	(0)
2025–	SC Freiburg II	2	(1)
2025–2026	→ Fortuna Düsseldorf (loan)	28	(4)

International career^{‡}
2018	Germany U20	5	(1)
2019–	Kosovo	40	(3)
- * Club domestic league appearances and goals as of 18 May 2026 ‡ National team caps and goals as of 20:43, 31 March 2026 (UTC)

Florent Muslija (Gheg Albanian pronunciation: [fɫɔˈɾɛnt musˈliːja]; born 6 July 1998) is a professional footballer who plays as a midfielder for Bundesliga club SC Freiburg. Born in Germany, he plays for the Kosovo national team.

== Club career ==
=== Karlsruher SC ===
On 21 May 2017, Muslija made his debut as professional footballer in a 2–1 away defeat against Eintracht Braunschweig after coming on as a substitute in the 70th minute in place of Kai Luibrand. Three days after the debut, he signed a two-year professional contract with Karlsruher SC. On 9 November 2017, Muslija extended his contract prematurely until 2021.

=== Hannover 96 ===
On 31 August 2018, Muslija in last day of the 2018 summer transfer window signed a four-year contract with Bundesliga club Hannover 96. Hannover 96 reportedly paid a €2 million transfer fee. His debut with Hannover 96 came on 30 September in Matchday 6 of 2018–19 Bundesliga against Eintracht Frankfurt after coming on as a substitute in the 69th minute in place of Julian Korb.

=== SC Paderborn ===
On 2 January 2022, Muslija signed a one-and-a-half-year contract with 2. Bundesliga club SC Paderborn and received squad number 30. Thirteen days later, he made his debut in a 2–1 away win against 1. FC Nürnberg after being named in the starting line-up. Seven days after debut, Muslija scored his first goals for SC Paderborn in his second appearance for the club in a 3–4 home defeat over Werder Bremen in 2. Bundesliga.

=== SC Freiburg ===
On 24 January 2024, Muslija joined Bundesliga side SC Freiburg and received squad number 23.

On 8 August 2025, he was loaned to Fortuna Düsseldorf in 2. Bundesliga, with an option to buy.

== International career ==
=== Germany ===
==== Under-20 ====
On 25 August 2017, Muslija received a call-up from Germany U20 for the unofficial friendly match against Greuther Fürth and 2017–18 Under 20 Elite League match against Czech Republic U20. On 7 September 2018, he made his debut with Germany U20 in a 2018–19 Under 20 Elite League match against Czech Republic U20 after coming on as a substitute in the 62nd minute in place of Linton Maina.

=== Kosovo ===
On 21 June 2019, The Football Federation of Kosovo confirmed through a communiqué that Muslija had decided to play for the Kosovo national team. On 30 August 2019, Muslija received a call-up from Kosovo for the UEFA Euro 2020 qualifying matches against Czech Republic and England. On 7 September 2019, he made his debut with Kosovo in a UEFA Euro 2020 qualifying match against Czech Republic after coming on as a substitute in the 56th minute in place of Edon Zhegrova.

== Career statistics ==
=== Club ===
As of match played 17 May 2026

Appearances and goals by club, season and competition
Club	Season	League			DFB-Pokal		Continental		Other		Total	
Club	Season	Division	Apps	Goals	Apps	Goals	Apps	Goals	Apps	Goals	Apps	Goals
Karlsruher SC	2016–17	2. Bundesliga	1	0	0	0	—		—		1	0
Karlsruher SC	2017–18	3. Liga	37	1	1	0	—		6 (Note: Four appearances in Baden Cup, two appearances in 2. Bundesliga relegation play-offs)	0	44	1
Karlsruher SC	2018–19	3. Liga	5	1	1	0	—		1 (Note: Appearance in Baden Cup)	0	7	1
Karlsruher SC	Total		43	2	2	0	—		7	0	52	2
Hannover 96	2018–19	Bundesliga	17	2	1	0	—		—		18	2
Hannover 96	2019–20	2. Bundesliga	20	1	1	0	—		—		21	1
Hannover 96	2020–21	2. Bundesliga	26	5	2	0	—		—		28	5
Hannover 96	2021–22	2. Bundesliga	13	1	1	1	—		—		14	2
Hannover 96	Total		76	9	5	1	—		—		81	10
SC Paderborn	2021–22	2. Bundesliga	16	6	—		—		—		16	6
SC Paderborn	2022–23	2. Bundesliga	33	10	2	0	—		—		35	10
SC Paderborn	2023–24	2. Bundesliga	16	7	3	2	—		—		19	9
SC Paderborn	Total		65	23	5	2	—		—		70	25
SC Freiburg	2023–24	Bundesliga	10	0	—		3 (Note: Appearances in UEFA Europa League)	0	—		13	0
SC Freiburg	2024–25	Bundesliga	9	0	2	0	0	0	—		11	0
SC Freiburg	2026–27	Bundesliga	0	0	0	0	0	0	—		0	0
SC Freiburg	Total		19	0	2	0	3	0	—		24	0
Fortuna Düsseldorf (loan)	2025–26	2. Bundesliga	28	4	2	1	—		—		30	5
Career total			231	38	16	4	3	0	7	0	258	42

=== International ===
As of match played 31 March 2026

National team	Year	Apps	Goals
Kosovo	2019	3	0
Kosovo	2020	1	0
Kosovo	2021	3	0
Kosovo	2022	6	1
Kosovo	2023	10	0
Kosovo	2024	6	0
Kosovo	2025	9	1
Kosovo	2026	2	1
Total		40	3

Scores and results list Kosovo's goal tally first, score column indicates score after each Muslija goal.

List of international goals scored by Florent Muslija
No.	Date	Venue	Opponent	Score	Result	Competition
1	27 September 2022	Fadil Vokrri Stadium, Pristina, Kosovo	Cyprus	1–0	5–1	2022–23 UEFA Nations League C
2	18 November 2025	Fadil Vokrri Stadium, Pristina, Kosovo	Switzerland	1–1	1–1	2026 FIFA World Cup qualification
3	26 March 2026	Tehelné pole, Bratislava, Slovakia	Slovakia	3–2	4–3	2026 FIFA World Cup qualification
