= Prince Owusu (footballer, born January 1997) =

Ghanaian footballer (born 1997)

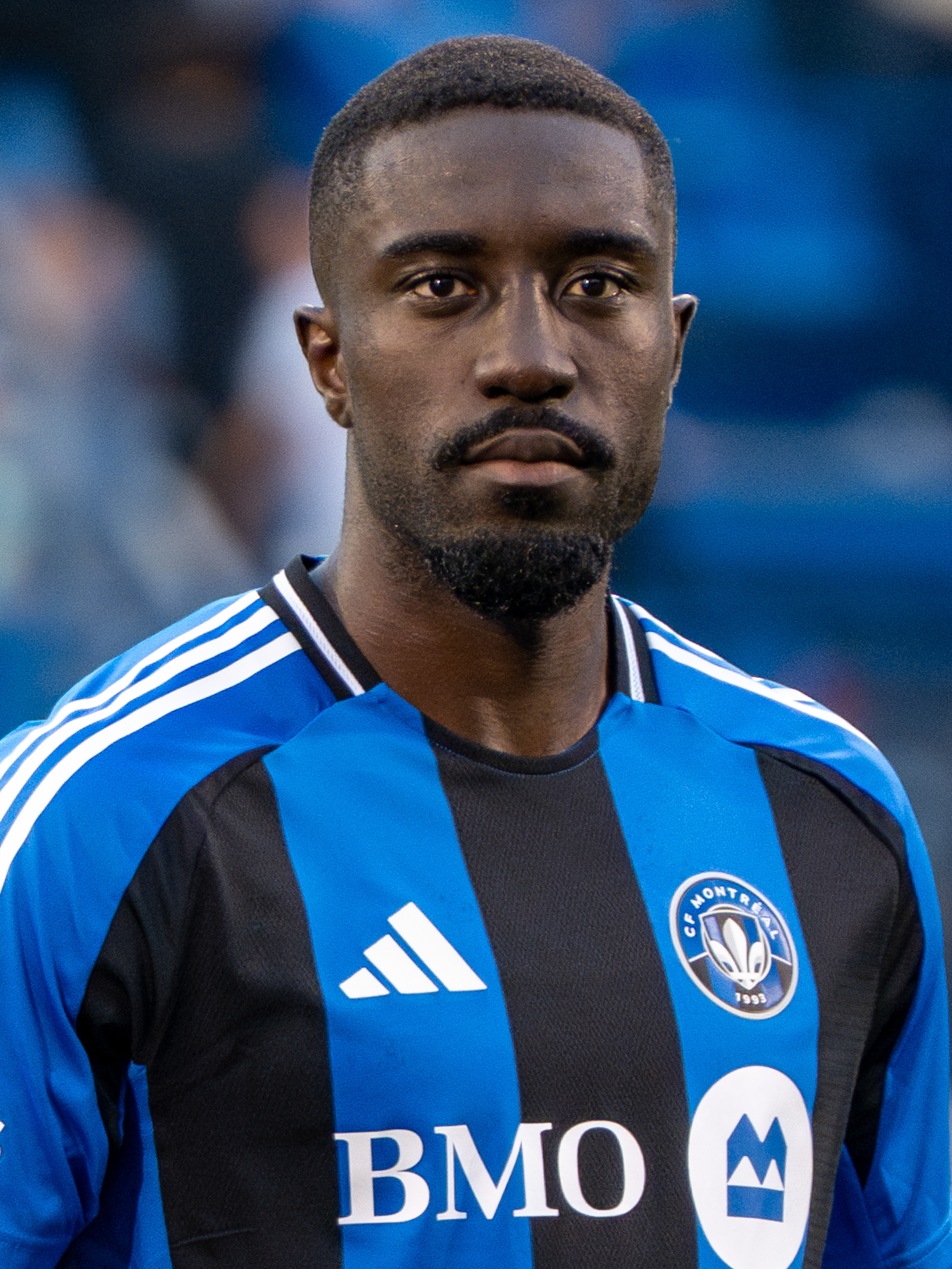
- Owusu with CF Montréal in 2025

Personal information
- Full name: Prince Osei Owusu
- Date of birth: 7 January 1997 (age 29)
- Place of birth: Wertheim am Main, Germany
- Height: 1.91 m (6 ft 3 in)
- Position: Forward

Team information
- Current team: CF Montréal
- Number: 9

Youth career
- SV Grün-Weiss Sommerrain
- FC Stuttgart-Cannstatt
- 2009–2015: VfB Stuttgart

Senior career*
Years	Team	Apps	(Gls)
2015–2017	VfB Stuttgart II	24	(0)
2017–2018	TSG Hoffenheim II	36	(17)
2018–2020	Arminia Bielefeld	11	(0)
2019	→ 1860 Munich (loan)	16	(3)
2019–2020	→ 1860 Munich (loan)	28	(4)
2020–2022	SC Paderborn	28	(0)
2022	Erzgebirge Aue	12	(2)
2022–2023	Jahn Regensburg	32	(9)
2023–2024	Toronto FC	37	(9)
2025–	CF Montréal	60	(28)

International career^{‡}
2011	Germany U15	2	(2)
2014–2015	Germany U18	7	(2)
2015	Germany U19	2	(1)
2025–	Ghana	2	(0)
- * Club domestic league appearances and goals as of 10 October 2026 ‡ National team caps and goals as of 18 November 2025

Prince Osei Owusu (born 7 January 1997) is a professional footballer who plays as a forward for CF Montréal in Major League Soccer. Born in Germany, he plays for the Ghana national team.

== Early life ==
Despite his mother not wanting him to play football, Owusu was always playing, prompting his father to eventually register him with SV Grün-Weiss Sommerrain, before later joining FC Stuttgart-Cannstatt. At age 12, he had a trial with the Stuttgarter Kickers, but did not make the squad, but later had a trial with the VfB Stuttgart academy, where he was accepted.

== Club career ==
On 25 July 2015, Owusu made his professional debut with VfB Stuttgart II in the 3. Liga against Dynamo Dresden. In August 2015, he signed a three-year extension with the club.

In January 2017, he signed with 1899 Hoffenheim II.

In April 2018, it was announced Owusu would join 2. Bundesliga side Arminia Bielefeld for the 2018–19 season. On 26 January 2019, he was loaned out to 1860 Munich for the rest of the season. On 31 August 2019, he returned to 1860 Munich for another loan spell until the end of 2019–20 season. Upon his return from his loan in the summer of 2020, he was allowed to leave the club with a year remaining on his contract, with the club leaving him off of their pre-season training camp roster.

In October 2020, Owusu signed with SC Paderborn.

In January 2022, Owusu moved to 2. Bundesliga side Erzgebirge Aue until the end of the 2021–22 season. The agreement included an option for another season in case Erzgebirge Aue avoided relegation.

In July 2022, Owusu moved to 2. Bundesliga club Jahn Regensburg.

On 4 August 2023, Owusu was signed by Major League Soccer side Toronto FC. On 23 March 2024, he scored his first MLS goal, in a 2–0 victory over Atlanta United FC. After finishing as the team's leading goal scorer in 2024, with nine league goals and twelve in all competitions, the club declined his contract option for the 2025 season.

In January 2025, CF Montréal acquired his MLS rights from Toronto FC in exchange for $175,000 in GAM and $75,000 in conditional GAM and signed him to a two-year contract, with an option for a third season. Following the 2025 season, Owusu was awarded the Giuseppe-Saputo Trophy as the club's Most Valuable Player.

== International career ==
Owusu has represented Germany at U-15, U-18, and U-19 levels.

On 11 November 2025, Owusu was called up for the first time to the Ghana national team for friendlies against Japan and South Korea.

== Personal life ==
Born in Germany, Owusu is of Ghanaian descent.

== Career statistics ==
=== Club ===
As of match played 21 October 2026

Appearances and goals by club, season and competition
Club	Season	League			National cup (Note: Includes DFB-Pokal, Canadian Championship)		Other		Total	
Club	Season	Division	Apps	Goals	Apps	Goals	Apps	Goals	Apps	Goals
VfB Stuttgart II	2015–16	3. Liga	14	0	—		—		14	0
VfB Stuttgart II	2016–17	Regionalliga Südwest	10	0	—		—		10	0
VfB Stuttgart II	Total		24	0	—		—		24	0
TSG Hoffenheim II	2016–17	Regionalliga Südwest	9	4	—		—		9	4
TSG Hoffenheim II	2017–18	Regionalliga Südwest	27	13	—		—		27	13
TSG Hoffenheim II	Total		36	17	—		—		36	17
Arminia Bielefeld	2018–19	2. Bundesliga	11	0	2	2	—		13	2
1860 Munich (loan)	2018–19	3. Liga	16	3	—		0	0	16	3
1860 Munich (loan)	2019–20	3. Liga	28	4	—		1 (Note: Appearance in Bavarian Cup)	1	29	5
1860 Munich (loan)	Total		44	7	—		1	1	45	8
SC Paderborn	2020–21	2. Bundesliga	21	0	2	1	—		23	1
SC Paderborn	2021–22	2. Bundesliga	7	0	1	0	—		8	0
SC Paderborn	Total		28	0	3	1	—		31	1
Erzgebirge Aue	2021–22	2. Bundesliga	12	2	—		—		12	2
Jahn Regensburg	2022–23	2. Bundesliga	32	9	2	1	—		34	10
Toronto FC	2023	Major League Soccer	6	0	0	0	0	0	6	0
Toronto FC	2024	Major League Soccer	31	9	5	3	3 (Note: Appearances in Leagues Cup)	0	39	12
Toronto FC	Total		37	9	5	3	3	0	45	12
CF Montréal	2025	Major League Soccer	34	13	3	2	3	2	40	17
CF Montréal	2026	Major League Soccer	26	15	6	3	—		32	18
CF Montréal	Total		60	28	9	5	3	2	72	35
Career total			284	72	21	12	7	3	312	89
