= Julian Justvan =

German footballer

Personal information
- Date of birth: 2 April 1998 (age 28)
- Place of birth: Landshut, Germany
- Height: 1.77 m (5 ft 10 in)
- Position: Attacking midfielder

Team information
- Current team: 1. FC Nürnberg
- Number: 10

Youth career
- SV Wörth
- Greuther Fürth
- –2014: FC Dingolfing
- 2014–2017: 1860 Munich

Senior career*
| Years | Team | Apps | (Gls) |
| 2016–2017 | 1860 Munich II | 9 | (2) |
| 2017–2020 | VfL Wolfsburg II | 81 | (20) |
| 2020–2023 | SC Paderborn | 96 | (8) |
| 2023–2024 | TSG Hoffenheim | 4 | (0) |
| 2024 | → Darmstadt 98 (loan) | 14 | (2) |
| 2024– | 1. FC Nürnberg | 65 | (15) |

International career^{‡}
| 2015–2016 | Germany U18 | 7 | (1) |
- * Club domestic league appearances and goals as of 18 May 2026 ‡ National team caps and goals as of 14:19, 20 September 2020 (UTC)

Julian Justvan (born 2 April 1998) is a German professional footballer plays as an attacking midfielder for 2. Bundesliga side 1. FC Nürnberg.

== Career ==
Justvan made his professional debut for SC Paderborn in the 2. Bundesliga on 20 September 2020, coming on as a substitute in the 78th minute for Sven Michel against Holstein Kiel, with the away match finishing as a 1–0 loss.

On 19 January 2024, Justvan joined Darmstadt 98 on loan until the end of the 2023–24 season.

On 20 August 2024, Justvan signed a long-term contract with 1. FC Nürnberg in 2. Bundesliga.

== National team ==
Justvan played seven times for Germany's U18s alongside teammates such as Ridle Baku, Christoph Daferner, Nicklas Shipnoski and Dominik Franke and scored one goal.

== Career statistics ==
As of match played on 16 August 2024

Appearances and goals by club, season and competition
| Club | Season | League | | | DFB-Pokal | | Other | | Total | |
| Club | Season | Division | Apps | Goals | Apps | Goals | Apps | Goals | Apps | Goals |
|---|---|---|---|---|---|---|---|---|---|---|
| TSV 1860 Munich II | 2016–17 | Regionalliga Bayern | 9 | 2 | — | | — | | 9 | 2 |
| VfL Wolfsburg II | 2017–18 | Regionalliga Nord | 30 | 6 | — | | — | | 30 | 6 |
| VfL Wolfsburg II | 2018–19 | Regionalliga Nord | 30 | 7 | — | | 2 (Note: Appearances in the 2018–19 Regionalliga Promotion play-offs) | 0 | 32 | 7 |
| VfL Wolfsburg II | 2019–20 | Regionalliga Nord | 21 | 7 | — | | — | | 21 | 7 |
| VfL Wolfsburg II | Total | | 81 | 20 | 0 | 0 | 2 | 0 | 83 | 20 |
| SC Paderborn | 2020–21 | 2. Bundesliga | 29 | 2 | 2 | 1 | — | | 31 | 3 |
| SC Paderborn | 2021–22 | 2. Bundesliga | 33 | 1 | 1 | 0 | — | | 34 | 1 |
| SC Paderborn | 2022–23 | 2. Bundesliga | 34 | 5 | 3 | 2 | — | | 37 | 7 |
| SC Paderborn | Total | | 96 | 8 | 6 | 3 | 0 | 0 | 102 | 11 |
| TSG Hoffenheim | 2023–24 | Bundesliga | 4 | 0 | 1 | 1 | — | | 5 | 1 |
| TSG Hoffenheim | 2024–25 | Bundesliga | 0 | 0 | 1 | 0 | 0 | 0 | 1 | 0 |
| TSG Hoffenheim | Total | | 4 | 0 | 2 | 1 | 0 | 0 | 6 | 1 |
| TSG Hoffenheim II | 2023–24 | Regionalliga Südwest | 1 | 0 | — | | — | | 1 | 0 |
| Darmstadt 98 (loan) | 2023–24 | Bundesliga | 14 | 2 | — | | — | | 14 | 2 |
| Career totals | | | 205 | 32 | 8 | 4 | 2 | 0 | 215 | 36 |
