= Kai Luibrand =

German footballer

Personal information
- Date of birth: 24 April 1994 (age 32)
- Place of birth: Biberach an der Riss, Germany
- Height: 1.81 m (5 ft 11 in)
- Position: Forward

Team information
- Current team: FV Illertissen
- Number: 9

Youth career
- –2013: SSV Ulm

Senior career*
Years	Team	Apps	(Gls)
2013–2014	TSV Reichenbach		
2014	Kickers Pforzheim	5	(0)
2015–2018	Karlsruher SC II	76	(18)
2016–2018	Karlsruher SC	6	(0)
2018–2019	SSV Ulm	2	(0)
2019–	FV Illertissen	18	(9)
- * Club domestic league appearances and goals as of 16:50, 21 November 2019 (UTC)

Kai Luibrand (born 24 April 1994) is a German footballer who plays as a forward for FV Illertissen.
