= Lukas Scherff =

German footballer

Personal information
- Date of birth: 14 July 1996 (age 30)
- Place of birth: Schwerin, Germany
- Height: 1.75 m (5 ft 9 in)
- Position: Defender

Youth career
- Schweriner SC
- –2010: Eintracht Schwerin
- 2010–2015: Hansa Rostock

Senior career*
Years	Team	Apps	(Gls)
2014–2024	Hansa Rostock	116	(8)
2015–2024	Hansa Rostock II	29	(2)
2016–2017	→ FC Schönberg 95 (loan)	44	(5)
- * Club domestic league appearances and goals as of 19 May 2024

Lukas Scherff (born 14 July 1996) is a German professional footballer who plays as a defender.
