= Jannis Heuer =

German footballer

Personal information
- Date of birth: 29 July 1999 (age 27)
- Place of birth: Burgwedel, Germany
- Height: 1.89 m (6 ft 2 in)
- Position: Defender

Team information
- Current team: Greuther Fürth
- Number: 22

Youth career
- –2014: Hannover 96
- 2014–2018: VfL Wolfsburg

Senior career*
Years	Team	Apps	(Gls)
2018–2021	VfL Wolfsburg II	24	(4)
2021–2024	SC Paderborn	63	(5)
2024–2026	1. FC Kaiserslautern	26	(1)
2025–2026	→ Preußen Münster (loan)	30	(3)
2026–	Greuther Fürth	0	(0)
- * Club domestic league appearances and goals as of 18 May 2026

Jannis Heuer (born 29 July 1999) is a German professional footballer who plays as a defender for 2. Bundesliga club Greuther Fürth.

== Career ==
Heuer was born in Burgwedel. After playing youth football for Hannover 96, he switched to VfL Wolfsburg in 2014. He made his senior debut for VfL Wolfsburg II on 9 December 2018 in a 6–1 win over Eintracht Norderstedt. In total, he scored four goals in 24 appearances for Wolfsburg II. He joined SC Paderborn on a two-year contract in July 2021. He made his debut for SC Paderborn on 24 July 2021 when he was named in the starting eleven for a 0–0 2. Bundesliga draw with 1. FC Heidenheim. In March 2023, he extended his contract with the club.

On 10 June 2024, Heuer joined fellow 2. Bundesliga club 1. FC Kaiserslautern.

On 7 August 2025, Heuer was loaned by Preußen Münster.

On 25 June 2026, Heuer moved to Greuther Fürth on a three-year deal.
