= Tobias Müller (footballer, born 1994) =

German footballer

Personal information
- Date of birth: 8 July 1994 (age 32)
- Place of birth: Tiefenbronn, Germany
- Height: 1.88 m (6 ft 2 in)
- Position: Defender

Team information
- Current team: 1. FC Magdeburg
- Number: 5

Youth career
- –2010: Germania Brötzingen
- 2010–2013: FC Nöttingen

Senior career*
Years	Team	Apps	(Gls)
2013–2015	FC Nöttingen	58	(3)
2015–2017	SC Freiburg II	52	(0)
2017–2018	Hallescher FC	26	(0)
2018–2022	1. FC Magdeburg	126	(6)
2022–2024	SC Paderborn	26	(0)
2024–	1. FC Magdeburg	55	(1)
- * Club domestic league appearances and goals as of 18 May 2026

Tobias Müller (born 8 July 1994) is a German professional footballer who plays as a defender for 2. Bundesliga club 1. FC Magdeburg.

== Club career ==
On 23 May 2022, Müller signed with SC Paderborn for the 2022–23 season.

On 2 January 2024, Müller returned to 1. FC Magdeburg.
