= Johannes Dörfler =

German footballer

Personal information
- Date of birth: 23 August 1996 (age 30)
- Place of birth: Düsseldorf, Germany
- Height: 1.86 m (6 ft 1 in)
- Position: Winger

Team information
- Current team: 1. FC Bocholt
- Number: 36

Youth career
- –2012: Borussia Mönchengladbach
- 2012–2015: 1. FC Mönchengladbach

Senior career*
Years	Team	Apps	(Gls)
2015	1. FC Mönchengladbach	1	(1)
2015–2016	MSV Duisburg II	25	(1)
2016–2019	KFC Uerdingen	61	(7)
2019–2024	SC Paderborn II	10	(0)
2019–2024	SC Paderborn	33	(1)
2020	→ FSV Zwickau (loan)	9	(0)
2022–2023	→ Waldhof Mannheim (loan)	3	(0)
2024–	1. FC Bocholt	41	(3)
- * Club domestic league appearances and goals as of 24 June 2026

Johannes Dörfler (born 23 August 1996) is a German professional footballer who plays as a winger for 1. FC Bocholt.

== Club career ==
For the 2022–23 season, Dörfler joined Waldhof Mannheim on loan.
