= Kai Pröger =

German footballer (born 1992)

Personal information
- Date of birth: 15 May 1992 (age 34)
- Place of birth: Wilhelmshaven, Germany
- Height: 1.77 m (5 ft 10 in)
- Position: Right winger

Team information
- Current team: VfB Oldenburg
- Number: 11

Youth career
- –2011: Heidmühler FC

Senior career*
Years	Team	Apps	(Gls)
2011–2012	Heidmühler FC		
2012–2013	VfB Oldenburg II	13	(8)
2013–2014	VfB Oldenburg	48	(12)
2014–2015	Mainz 05 II	2	(0)
2015–2017	BFC Dynamo	66	(16)
2017–2019	Rot-Weiss Essen	50	(15)
2019–2022	SC Paderborn	108	(14)
2022–2024	Hansa Rostock	63	(14)
2024–2025	Jahn Regensburg	27	(2)
2025–2026	VfL Osnabrück	28	(1)
2026–	VfB Oldenburg	10	(3)
- * Club domestic league appearances and goals as of 22 September 2026

Kai Pröger (born 15 May 1992) is a German professional footballer who plays as a right winger for Regionalliga Nord club VfB Oldenburg.

== Career ==
Pröger made his professional debut for Mainz 05 II in the 3. Liga on 2 August 2014, coming on as a substitute in the 63rd minute for Marc Wachs in the 2–2 away draw against Fortuna Köln.

In January 2019, Präger joined 2. Bundesliga side SC Paderborn from fourth-tier Rot-Weiss Essen on a 2.5-year contract until 2021.

After an extension until 2022, Pröger signed with Hansa Rostock in May 2022.

In summer 2024, he joined Jahn Regensburg.

On 25 June 2025, Pröger moved to VfL Osnabrück in 3. Liga.

== Honours ==
VfL Osnabrück

- 3. Liga: 2025–26
