= Sven Michel (footballer) =

German footballer

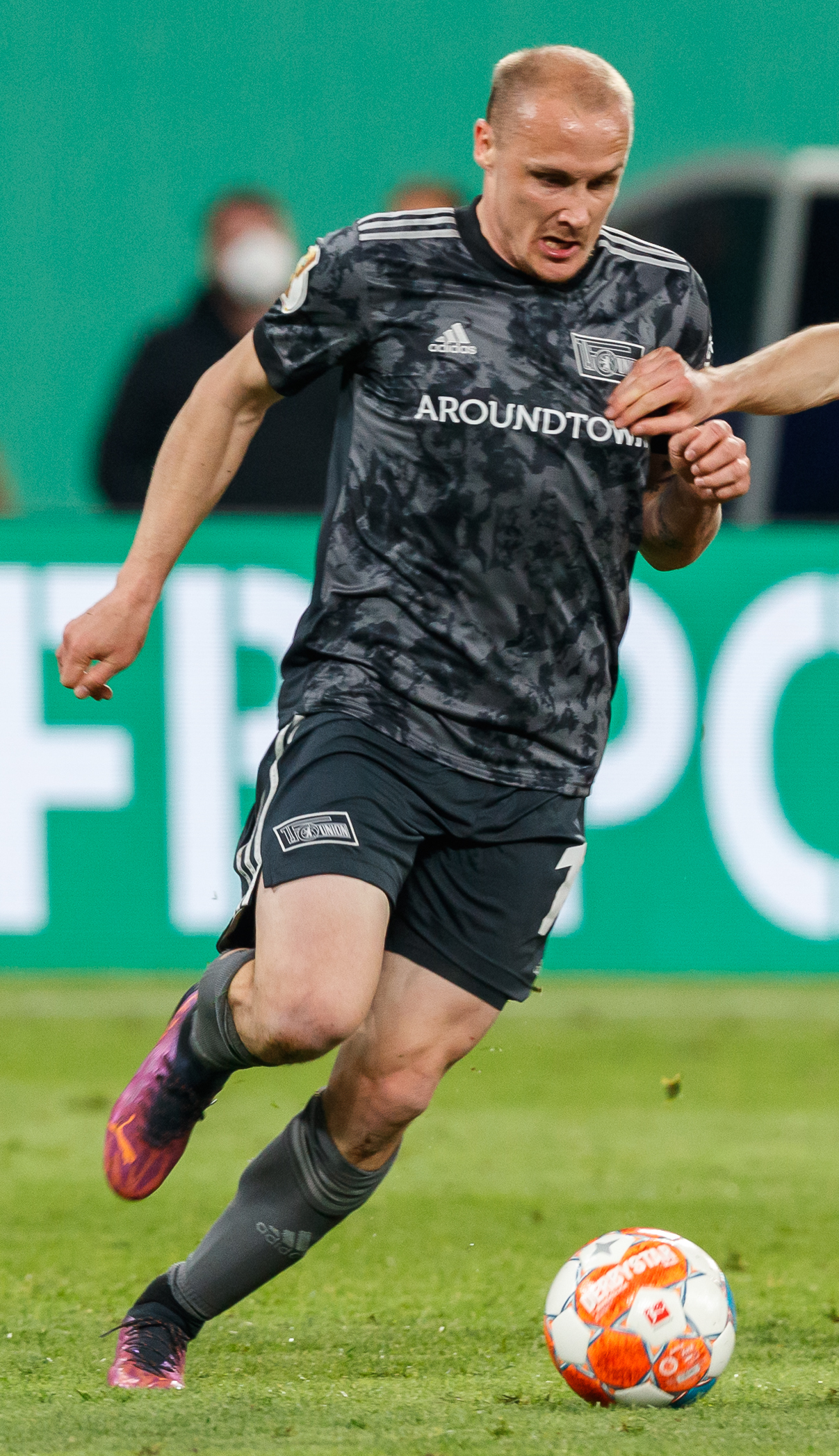
- Michel with Union Berlin in 2022

Personal information
- Date of birth: 15 July 1990 (age 36)
- Place of birth: Freudenberg, Germany
- Height: 1.77 m (5 ft 10 in)
- Position: Forward

Team information
- Current team: SC Paderborn
- Number: 11

Youth career
- TuS Alchen
- –2003: Fortuna Freudenberg
- 2003–2004: Borussia Dortmund
- 2004–2010: SuS Niederschelden

Senior career*
Years	Team	Apps	(Gls)
2010–2013	Sportfreunde Siegen	54	(34)
2013–2014	Borussia M'gladbach II	34	(12)
2014–2016	Energie Cottbus	66	(12)
2016–2022	SC Paderborn	161	(60)
2022–2023	Union Berlin	34	(6)
2023–2024	FC Augsburg	22	(2)
2024–	SC Paderborn	54	(7)
- * Club domestic league appearances and goals as of 24 October 2026

Sven Michel (born 15 July 1990) is a German professional footballer who plays as a forward for Bundesliga club SC Paderborn.

== Club career ==
On 5 July 2024, Michel returned to SC Paderborn in the 2. Bundesliga.

== Career statistics ==
As of match played 24 October 2026

Appearances and goals by club, season and competition
Club	Season	League			National cup		Europe		Other		Total	
Club	Season	Division	Apps	Goals	Apps	Goals	Apps	Goals	Apps	Goals	Apps	Goals
Sportfreunde Siegen	2011–12	NRW-Liga	34	11	0	0	—		—		34	11
Sportfreunde Siegen	2012–13	Regionalliga West	20	14	1	0	—		—		21	14
Sportfreunde Siegen	Total		54	25	1	0	—		—		55	25
Borussia Mönchengladbach II	2012–13	Regionalliga West	15	6	—		—		—		15	6
Borussia Mönchengladbach II	2013–14	Regionalliga West	19	6	—		—		—		19	6
Borussia Mönchengladbach II	Total		34	12	—		—		—		34	12
Energie Cottbus	2013–14	2. Bundesliga	14	2	0	0	—		—		14	2
Energie Cottbus	2014–15	3. Liga	29	8	5	2	—		—		34	10
Energie Cottbus	2015–16	3. Liga	23	2	2	2	—		—		25	4
Energie Cottbus	Total		66	12	7	4	—		—		73	16
SC Paderborn	2016–17	3. Liga	26	5	5	5	—		—		31	10
SC Paderborn	2017–18	3. Liga	37	19	7	2	—		—		44	21
SC Paderborn	2018–19	2. Bundesliga	26	10	3	0	—		0	0	29	10
SC Paderborn	2019–20	Bundesliga	29	5	1	0	—		—		30	1
SC Paderborn	2020–21	2. Bundesliga	24	7	3	3	—		—		27	10
SC Paderborn	2021–22	2. Bundesliga	19	14	1	1	—		0	0	20	15
SC Paderborn	Total		161	60	20	11	—		0	0	181	71
Union Berlin	2021–22	Bundesliga	13	3	2	0	—		—		15	3
Union Berlin	2022–23	Bundesliga	21	3	2	1	6 (Note: Appearances in UEFA Europa League)	2	—		29	6
Union Berlin	Total		34	6	4	1	6	2	0	0	44	9
FC Augsburg	2023–24	Bundesliga	22	2	1	0	—		—		23	2
SC Paderborn	2024–25	2. Bundesliga	26	4	2	1	—		—		28	5
SC Paderborn	2025–26	2. Bundesliga	27	3	1	1	—		2 (Note: Appearances in 2. Bundesliga promotion play-offs)	0	30	4
SC Paderborn	2026–27	Bundesliga	1	0	0	0	—		—		1	0
SC Paderborn	Total		54	7	3	2	—		2	0	59	9
Career total			425	124	36	18	6	2	2	0	471	139

== Honours ==
Energie Cottbus

- Brandenburg Cup: 2014–15

SC Paderborn

- Westphalian Cup: 2016–17, 2017–18

Individual

- Regionalliga West top scorer: 2012–13
