= Sebastian Vasiliadis =

German footballer

Personal information
- Date of birth: 4 October 1997 (age 29)
- Place of birth: Auenwald, Germany
- Height: 1.75 m (5 ft 9 in)
- Position: Midfielder

Team information
- Current team: 1. FC Saarbrücken
- Number: 19

Youth career
- –2013: TSG Backnang
- 2013–2016: VfR Aalen

Senior career*
Years	Team	Apps	(Gls)
2015–2018	VfR Aalen	60	(7)
2018–2021	SC Paderborn	79	(7)
2021–2023	Arminia Bielefeld	48	(3)
2023–2024	Hansa Rostock	20	(0)
2024–	1. FC Saarbrücken	41	(8)
- * Club domestic league appearances and goals as of 30 May 2026

Sebastian Vasiliadis (Greek: Σεμπάστιαν Βασιλειάδης; born 4 October 1997) is a German professional footballer who plays as a midfielder for 3. Liga club 1. FC Saarbrücken.

== Club career ==
=== SC Paderborn ===
On 1 July 2018, Vasiliadis signed a two years' contract with 2. Bundesliga club SC Paderborn for an undisclosed fee. On 25 November 2018, he scored a brace in a 5–1 away win against 1. FC Heidenheim in the last ten minutes of the match. In the 2018–19 season, in a remarkable turn of events, Vasiliadis (6 goals, 8 assists) helped the newly promoted side club managed another top-two finish, which returned Paderborn to the Bundesliga after years of turbulence. He started the 2019–20 season as the undisputed leader in the middle line.

On 2 February 2020, Vasiliadis scored his first goal in the season in a 2–4 home loss against VfL Wolfsburg with a right footed shot from outside the box to the centre of the goal, after an assist from Abdelhamid Sabiri.

=== Arminia Bielefeld ===
In January 2021, it was reported that Vasiliadis would join Arminia Bielefeld from SC Paderborn in the summer, at which point he was out of contract. Bielefeld had first shown interest in Vasiliadis the previous summer, but the two clubs could not agree on a transfer fee at the time. The move was confirmed in May. Vasiliadis signed a three-year contract. On 30 October 2021, he made his debut with the club as a late substitute in a 2–1 home loss against Mainz 05. In December 2021, Vasiliadis contracted COVID-19 forcing him to isolate at home.

=== Hansa Rostock ===
On 23 June 2023, Sebastian moved to 2. Bundesliga club Hansa Rostock on a contract until 30 June 2026.

=== Saarbrücken ===
On 25 June 2024, Vasiliadis signed with 1. FC Saarbrücken in 3. Liga.

== International career ==
Born in Germany, Vasiliadis comes from a Greek family and is eligible to represent both Germany and Greece internationally.

On 11 November 2019, Vasiliadis was called by Greece national team coach John van 't Schip ahead for the upcoming UEFA Euro 2020 qualifying fixtures against Armenia and Finland, on 15 and 18 November 2019 respectively, but did not feature in either match.

== Personal life ==
Vasiliadis was born in Auenwald, Germany, to Greek father and German mother.

== Career statistics ==
As of 30 March 2024

Appearances and goals by club, season and competition
Club	Season	League			Cup		Other		Total	
Club	Season	Division	Apps	Goals	Apps	Goals	Apps	Goals	Apps	Goals
VfR Aalen II	2014–15	Oberliga Baden-Württemberg	3	0	0	0	0	0	3	0
VfR Aalen	2015–16	3. Liga	8	0	0	0	0	0	8	0
VfR Aalen	2016–17	3. Liga	28	2	0	0	0	0	28	2
VfR Aalen	2017–18	3. Liga	24	5	0	0	0	0	24	5
VfR Aalen	Total		60	7	0	0	0	0	60	7
SC Paderborn	2018–19	2. Bundesliga	28	6	3	0	0	0	31	6
SC Paderborn	2019–20	Bundesliga	32	1	1	0	0	0	33	1
SC Paderborn	2020–21	2. Bundesliga	19	0	1	0	0	0	20	0
SC Paderborn	Total		79	7	5	0	0	0	84	7
Arminia Bielefeld	2021–22	Bundesliga	19	0	0	0	0	0	15	0
Arminia Bielefeld	2022–23	2.Bundesliga	29	3	0	0	2 (Note: Appearances in relegation play-offs)	0	31	3
Arminia Bielefeld	Total		48	3	0	0	2	0	50	3
Hansa Rostock	2023–24	2.Bundesliga	17	0	1	0	0	0	18	0
Career total			207	17	6	0	2	0	215	17
