= 2022–23 SSV Jahn Regensburg season =

SSV Jahn Regensburg
2022–23 season
- Chairman: Hans Rothammer
- Coach: Mersad Selimbegović (until 9 May); Joe Enochs (from 10 May)
- Stadium: Jahnstadion Regensburg
- 2. Bundesliga: 17 (relegated)
- DFB-Pokal: Second round
- Top goalscorer: League: Prince Osei Owusu (7); All: Prince Osei Owusu (8)
- Highest home attendance: 15,210 (sell-out)
- Lowest home attendance: 8,112
- Average home league attendance: 10756
- Biggest win: 3–0 vs. Arminia Bielefeld and 1. FC Kaiserslautern
- Biggest defeat: 0–6 vs. Karlsruher SC

The 2022–23 season was the 115th in the history of SSV Jahn Regensburg and their sixth consecutive season in the second division. The club participated in the 2. Bundesliga and the DFB-Pokal where they were eliminated in the second round. After a good start, the team was finally relegated to the 3. Liga.

== Players ==
As of 6 January 2023

Note: Flags indicate national team as defined under FIFA eligibility rules; some limited exceptions apply. Players may hold more than one non-FIFA nationality.

No.	Pos.	Nation	Player
1	GK	MKD	Dejan Stojanović
5	MF	GER	Benedikt Gimber (captain)
6	DF	GER	Benedikt Saller
7	MF	GER	Nicklas Shipnoski (on loan from FC Schalke 04)
8	MF	GER	Maximilian Thalhammer
9	FW	GER	Prince Osei Owusu
10	FW	GER	Kaan Caliskaner
11	DF	GER	Konrad Faber
12	FW	CRO	Dario Vizinger (on loan from Wolfsberger AC)
14	MF	GER	Blendi Idrizi (on loan from FC Schalke 04)
15	MF	NZL	Sarpreet Singh (on loan from Bayern Munich II)
16	FW	GER	Oscar Schönfelder (on loan from Werder Bremen)
18	FW	GER	Aygün Yıldırım
19	FW	DEN	Andreas Albers

No.	Pos.	Nation	Player
20	DF	GAM	Leon Guwara
21	GK	GER	Thorsten Kirschbaum
22	FW	GER	Minos Gouras
23	DF	GER	Steve Breitkreuz
24	DF	CAN	Scott Kennedy
26	FW	GER	Charalambos Makridis
27	DF	GER	Lasse Günther ([on loan from FC Augsburg)
28	DF	GER	Sebastian Nachreiner
29	FW	GER	Joshua Mees (on loan from Holstein Kiel)
30	MF	GER	Christian Viet
32	GK	GER	Alexander Weidinger
33	DF	SUI	Jan Elvedi
40	GK	GER	Jonas Urbig

=== Out on loan ===
Note: Flags indicate national team as defined under FIFA eligibility rules; some limited exceptions apply. Players may hold more than one non-FIFA nationality.

No.	Pos.	Nation	Player
27	FW	NED	Joël Zwarts (at ADO Den Haag until 30 June 2022)

== Transfers ==
=== In ===
No.	Pos	Player	Transferred from	Transfer Type	Fee	Date	Contract ends	Source
8	MF	Maximilian Thalhammer	SC Paderborn 07	Free transfer	None	1 July 2022	30 June 2025	
22	FW	Minos Gouras	1. FC Saarbrücken	Free transfer	None	1 July 2022	30 June 2025	
1	GK	Dejan Stojanović	Middlesbrough F.C.	Unknown	Unknown	1 July 2022	30 June 2024	
9	FW	Prince Osei Owusu	FC Erzgebirge Aue	Unknown	Unknown	1 July 2022	30 June 2024	
16	FW	Oscar Schönfelder	SV Werder Bremen	Loan	Unknown	1 July 2022	30 June 2023	
29	FW	Joshua Mees	Holstein Kiel	Loan	Unknown	1 July 2022	30 June 2023	
30	MF	Christian Viet	FC St. Pauli	Unknown	Unknown	1 July 2022	30 June 2024	
27	DF	Lasse Günther	FC Augsburg	Loan	Unknown	10 August 2022	30 June 2023	
14	MF	Blendi Idrizi	FC Schalke 04	Loan	Unknown	30 August 2022	30 June 2023	
12	FW	Dario Vizinger	Wolfsberger AC	Loan	Unknown	1 September 2022	30 June 2023	
40	GK	Jonas Urbig	1. FC Köln	Loan	Unknown	6 January 2023	30 June 2024	

=== Out ===
No.	Pos	Player	Transferred to	Transfer Type	Fee	Date	Source
7	MF	Max Besuschkow	Hannover 96	Free transfer	None	30 June 2022	
1	GK	Alexander Meyer	Borussia Dortmund	Free transfer	None	30 June 2022	
15	MF	Carlo Boukhalfa	SC Freiburg	Loan ended	N/A	30 June 2022	
13	FW	Erik Wekesser	1. FC Nürnberg	Free transfer	None	30 June 2022	
4	DF	Jan-Niklas Beste	SV Werder Bremen	Loan ended	N/A	30 June 2022	
14	FW	David Otto	TSG 1899 Hoffenheim	Loan ended	N/A	30 June 2022	
27	FW	Joël Zwarts	ADO Den Haag	Loan	Unknown	14 July 2022	
25	MF	Björn Zempelin	N/A	End of career	N/A	9 August 2022	

== Pre-season and friendlies ==
Win Draw Loss Fixtures

18 June 2022 Friendly	Jahn Regensburg	7–1	Taubertal-Auswahl	Tauberrettersheim
15:00 CEST (UTC+2)	Gouras 11'; Albers 26', 40'; Elvedi 35'; Yıldırım 79'; Schmidt 83'; Owusu 84'	Report	Schmieg 35'

19 June 2022 Friendly	Jahn Regensburg	9–0	FC Gottfrieding	Gottfrieding
12:00 CEST (UTC+2)	Owusu 10' (pen.), 12', 17'; Zwarts 11', 28'; Schönfelder 14'; Makridis 21'; Schmidt 31'; Thalhammer 35'	Report

19 June 2022 Friendly	Jahn Regensburg	10–0	VfR Laberweinting	Gottfrieding
13:00 CEST (UTC+2)	Guwara 3'; Albers 8' (pen.); Yıldırım 10', 19', 41'; Makridis 17'; Elvedi 24'; Schmidt 29', 43'; Bauer 33'	Report

24 June 2022 Friendly	Jahn Regensburg	10–3	SV Fortuna Regensburg	Regensburg
18:30 CEST (UTC+2)	Schmidt 3'; Yıldırım 10'; Thalhammer 31', 44'; Zwarts 34'; Mees 48'; Shipnoski 55'; Owusu 56'; Viet 70'; Gimber 86'	Report	Morina 16'; Terakaj 18'; Makridis 33' (o.g.)

25 June 2022 Friendly	Jahn Regensburg	2–0	SC Eltersdorf	Regensburg
13:00 CEST (UTC+2)	Albers 54' (pen.), 83'	Report		Stadium: Sportpark am Kaulbachweg

1 July 2022 Friendly	Jahn Regensburg	6–2	FSV Zwickau	Regensburg
14:00 CEST (UTC+2)	Thalhammer 37'; Albers 64'; Gimber 68'; Zwarts 78', 90'; Yıldırım 81'	Report	Krüger 11'; Agbaje 56'	Stadium: Sportpark am Kaulbachweg

2 July 2022 Friendly	Jahn Regensburg	0–0	Bayreuth	Rieden
14:00 CEST (UTC+2)		Report		Stadium: Sportgelände Rieden - Platz 1 Attendance: 1,200

8 July 2022 Friendly	Jahn Regensburg	2–1	Unterhaching	Regensburg
15:00 CEST (UTC+2)	Schmidt 59'; Kennedy 73'	Report	Maier 18'	Stadium: Sportpark am Kaulbachweg; Referee: Tobias Wittmann

9 July 2022 Friendly	Jahn Regensburg	2–2	(England) Norwich City	Grassau
14:00 CEST (UTC+2)	Albers 1'; Mees 41'	Report	Cantwell 17'; Rowe 64'	Stadium: Sportzentrum Brandstätt

22 September 2022 Friendly	Jahn Regensburg	3–3	(Austria) SKN St. Pölten	Schalding-Heining
16:00 CEST (UTC+2)	Owusu 4', 11'; Gimber 26'	Report	Montnor 21'; Barlov 52'; Hartwig 73'	Stadium: Sportgelände; Referee: Martin Speckner

8 January 2023 Friendly	SpVgg Bayreuth	0–0	Jahn Regensburg	Bayreuth
13:00 CEST (UTC+2)		Report		Stadium: Hans-Walter-Wild-Stadion; Attendance: about 500

14 January 2023 Friendly	Jahn Regensburg	1–0	(Austria) Kapfenberger SV	Regensburg
13:00 CEST (UTC+2)	Shipnoski 50'	Report		Stadium: Kaulbachweg; Attendance: about 250; Referee: Michael Bacher

21 January 2023 Friendly	Jahn Regensburg	4–0	(Austria) SK Vorwärts Steyr	Regensburg
13:00 CEST (UTC+2)	Owusu 51', 66'; Lageder 59' (o.g.); Graf 68'	Report		Stadium: Kaulbachweg

21 January 2023 Friendly	Jahn Regensburg	5–1	DJK Vilzing	Regensburg
15:00 CEST (UTC+2)	Yıldırım 34', 66'; Gouras 57'; Vizinger 63', 77'	Report	Stowasser 50'	Stadium: Kaulbachweg

== Competitions ==
=== Overall record ===
Competition	First match	Last match	Starting round	Final position	Record							
Competition	First match	Last match	Starting round	Final position	Pld	W	D	L	GF	GA	GD	Win %
2. Bundesliga	16 July 2022	28 May 2023	Matchday 1		34	8	7	19	34	58	−24	23.53
DFB-Pokal	1 August 2022	19 October 2022	First round	Second round	2	0	1	1	2	5	−3	0.00
Total					36	8	8	20	36	63	−27	22.22

Last updated: 5 August 2023
Source: Competitions

=== 2. Bundesliga ===
==== League table ====
Pos	Team	Pld	W	D	L	GF	GA	GD	Pts	Promotion, qualification or relegation
14	1. FC Nürnberg	34	10	9	15	32	49	−17	39	
15	Eintracht Braunschweig	34	9	9	16	42	59	−17	36	
16	Arminia Bielefeld (R)	34	9	7	18	50	62	−12	34	Qualification for relegation play-offs
17	Jahn Regensburg (R)	34	8	7	19	34	58	−24	31	Relegation to 3. Liga
18	SV Sandhausen (R)	34	7	7	20	35	63	−28	28	Relegation to 3. Liga

Source: DFB
Rules for classification: 1) Points; 2) Goal difference; 3) Goals scored; 4) Head-to-head results; 5) Head-to-head away goals scored; 6) Away goals scored; 7) Play-off.
(R) Relegated

==== Results summary ====
Overall								Home						Away					
Pld	W	D	L	GF	GA	GD	Pts	W	D	L	GF	GA	GD	W	D	L	GF	GA	GD
34	8	7	19	34	58	−24	31	4	7	6	17	28	−11	4	0	13	17	30	−13

Last updated: 5 August 2023.
Source: DFB

==== Results by round ====
Round	1	2	3	4	5	6	7	8	9	10	11	12	13	14	15	16	17	18	19	20	21	22	23	24	25	26	27	28	29	30	31	32	33	34
Ground	H	A	H	A	H	A	H	A	H	A	H	A	H	H	A	H	A	A	H	A	H	A	H	A	H	A	H	A	H	A	A	H	A	H
Result	W	W	D	L	L	L	D	L	W	L	D	W	W	L	L	D	L	L	L	L	D	L	L	W	W	L	D	L	D	L	L	L	W	L
Position	2	1	1	6	13	13	12	14	11	12	13	10	9	9	9	9	12	14	17	18	17	17	18	16	14	16	16	16	16	17	17	17	17	17

Updated to match(es) played on 5 August 2023. Source: DFB
A = Away; H = Home; W = Win; D = Draw; L = Loss

==== Matches ====
The league fixtures were announced on 17 June 2022.

16 July 2022 1	Jahn Regensburg	2–0	Darmstadt 98	Regensburg
13:00 CEST (UTC+2)	Mees 1'; Albers 67'	Report	Pfeiffer (red card) 37'	Stadium: Jahnstadion Regensburg; Attendance: 8,509; Referee: Patrick Alt

24 July 2022 2	Arminia Bielefeld	0–3	Jahn Regensburg	Bielefeld
13:30 CEST (UTC+2)		Report	Gimber 45+3'; Thalhammer 56'; Gouras 90+1'	Stadium: SchücoArena; Attendance: 18,144; Referee: Frank Willenborg

6 August 2022 3	Jahn Regensburg	0–0	1. FC Nürnberg	Regensburg
13:00 CEST (UTC+2)		Report		Stadium: Jahnstadion Regensburg; Attendance: 15,210 (sell-out); Referee: Daniel Schlager

14 August 2022 4	Hannover 96	1–0	Jahn Regensburg	Hanover
13:30 CEST (UTC+2)		Report	Breitkreuz 83'	Stadium: HDI-Arena; Attendance: 20,700; Referee: Martin Petersen

20 August 2022 5	Jahn Regensburg	0–6	Karlsruher SC	Regensburg
13:00 CEST (UTC+2)		Report	Franke 7'; Nebel 14'; Gondorf 43'; Schleusener 48', 66'; Breithaupt 78'	Stadium: Jahnstadion Regensburg; Attendance: 9,612; Referee: Michael Bacher

26 August 2022 6	Fortuna Düsseldorf	0–4	Jahn Regensburg	Düsseldorf
18:30 CEST (UTC+2)	Ginczek 59'; Kownacki 65' (pen.); Klaus 78'; Appelkamp 85'	Report		Stadium: Merkur Spiel-Arena; Attendance: 20,745; Referee: Florian Heft

3 September 2022 7	Jahn Regensburg	0–0	Holstein Kiel	Regensburg
13:00 CEST (UTC+2)		Report		Stadium: Jahnstadion Regensburg; Attendance: 8,893; Referee: Florian Lechner

10 September 2022 8	SC Paderborn 07	3–0	Jahn Regensburg	Paderborn
13:00 CEST (UTC+2)	Hoffmeier 21'; Leipertz 69'; Pieringer 86'	Report		Stadium: Home Deluxe Arena; Attendance: 9,276; Referee: Florian Badstübner

18 September 2022 9	Jahn Regensburg	2–0	FC St. Pauli	Regensburg
13:30 CEST (UTC+2)	Albers 8' (pen.), 41'	Report		Stadium: Jahnstadion Regensburg; Attendance: 12,124; Referee: Nicholas Winter

2 October 2022 10	1. FC Magdeburg	1–0	Jahn Regensburg	Magdeburg
13:30 CEST (UTC+2)	Schuler 68'	Report		Stadium: MDCC-Arena; Attendance: 19,008; Referee: Deniz Aytekin

7 October 2022 11	Jahn Regensburg	2–2	SpVgg Greuther Fürth	Regensburg
18:30 CEST (UTC+2)	Caliskaner 42', 62'	Report	Michalski 34'; Asta 76'	Stadium: Jahnstadion Regensburg; Attendance: 10,716; Referee: Michael Bacher

16 October 2022 12	1. FC Kaiserslautern	0–3	Jahn Regensburg	Kaiserslautern
13:30 CEST (UTC+2)	Albers 8', 57'; Owusu 85'	Report		Stadium: Fritz-Walter-Stadion; Attendance: 33,060; Referee: Martin Thomsen

22 October 2022 13	Jahn Regensburg	2–1	SV Sandhausen	Regensburg
13:00 CEST (UTC+2)	Zhirov 1'; Albers 70'	Report	Esswein 12'	Stadium: Jahnstadion Regensburg; Attendance: 8,123; Referee: Arne Aarnink

29 October 2022 14	Jahn Regensburg	0–3	FC Hansa Rostock	Regensburg
13:00 CEST (UTC+2)		Report	Pröger 7', 26'; Elvedi 64' (o.g.)	Stadium: Jahnstadion Regensburg; Attendance: 10,380; Referee: Florian Exner

6 November 2022 15	Hamburger SV	3–1	Jahn Regensburg	Hamburg
13:30 CET (UTC+1)	Caliskaner 7'	Report	Vušković 12'; Königsdörffer 79'; Glatzel 90'	Stadium: Volksparkstadion; Attendance: 51,314; Referee: Sascha Stegemann

9 November 2022 16	Jahn Regensburg	1–1	Eintracht Braunschweig	Regensburg
18:30 CET (UTC+1)	Makridis 11'	Report	Lauberbach 15'	Stadium: Jahnstadion Regensburg; Attendance: 8,232; Referee: Martin Petersen

12 November 2022 17	1. FC Heidenheim	5–4	Jahn Regensburg	Heidenheim
13:00 CET (UTC+1)	Kleindienst 21', 39'; Beck 36'; Thomalla 76'; Schimmer 90+4'	Report	Owusu 14'; Makridis 45+1'; Shipnoski 55'; Yıldırım 90+2'	Stadium: Voith-Arena; Attendance: 9,695; Referee: Florian Heft

28 January 2023 18	SV Darmstadt 98	2–0	Jahn Regensburg	Darmstadt
13:00 CET (UTC+1)	Manu 18'; Holland 29'	Report	Kennedy (red card) 21'	Stadium: Merck-Stadion am Böllenfalltor; Attendance: 15,798; Referee: Daniel Schlager

4 February 2023 19	Jahn Regensburg	1–3	Arminia Bielefeld	Regensburg
13:00 CET (UTC+1)	Elvedi 2'	Report	Vasiliadis 14'; Klos 85', 90+1'	Stadium: Jahnstadion Regensburg; Attendance: 8,547; Referee: Sven Waschitzki-Günther

11 February 2023 20	1. FC Nürnberg	1–0	Jahn Regensburg	Nuremberg
13:00 CET (UTC+1)	Valentini 56'	Report		Stadium: Max-Morlock-Stadion; Attendance: 27,118; Referee: Arne Aarnink

18 February 2023 21	Jahn Regensburg	1–1	Hannover 96	Regensburg
13:00 CET (UTC+1)	Singh 15'	Report	Teuchert 88'	Stadium: Jahnstadion Regensburg; Attendance: 8112; Referee: Max Burda

24 February 2023 22	Karlsruher SC	1–0	Jahn Regensburg	Karlsruhe
18:30 CET (UTC+1)	Kaufmann 24'	Report		Stadium: Wildparkstadion; Attendance: 18,191; Referee: Patrick Alt

4 March 2023 23	Jahn Regensburg	0–1	Fortuna Düsseldorf	Regensburg
13:00 CET (UTC+1)		Report	Kownacki 88' (pen.)	Stadium: Jahnstadion Regensburg; Attendance: 10,119; Referee: Robert Kampka

12 March 2023 24	Holstein Kiel	1–2	Jahn Regensburg	Kiel
13:30 CET (UTC+1)	Skrzybski 45+4'	Report	Caliskaner 45'; Owusu 87'	Stadium: Holstein-Stadion; Attendance: 10,698; Referee: Alexander Sather

18 March 2023 25	Jahn Regensburg	1–0	SC Paderborn 07	Regensburg
13:30 CET (UTC+1)	Owusu 49' (pen.)	Report		Stadium: Jahnstadion Regensburg; Attendance: 10,189; Referee: Martin Thomsen

1 April 2023 26	FC St. Pauli	1–0	Jahn Regensburg	Hamburg
13:00 CEST (UTC+2)	Owusu 23' (o.g.)	Report		Stadium: Millerntor-Stadion; Attendance: 29,235 (sell-out); Referee: Bastian Dankert

9 April 2023 27	Jahn Regensburg	2–2	1. FC Magdeburg	Regensburg
13:30 CEST (UTC+2)	Gnaka 52' (o.g.); Caliskaner 90'	Report	Atik 11'; Elfadli 81'	Stadium: Jahnstadion Regensburg; Attendance: 10,011; Referee: Tobias Stieler

14 April 2023 28	SpVgg Greuther Fürth	2–1	Jahn Regensburg	Fürth
18:30 CEST (UTC+2)	Green 66' (pen.); Abiama 77'	Report	Owusu 48'	Stadium: Sportpark Ronhof Thomas Sommer; Attendance: 12,570; Referee: Patrick Alt

23 April 2023 29	Jahn Regensburg	0–0	1. FC Kaiserslautern	Regensburg
13:30 CEST (UTC+2)		Report		Stadium: Jahnstadion Regensburg; Attendance: 14,668; Referee: Florian Lechner

30 April 2023 30	SV Sandhausen	2–1	Jahn Regensburg	Sandhausen
13:30 CEST (UTC+2)	Papela 16'; Đumić 52'	Report	Owusu 64'	Stadium: BWT-Stadion am Hardtwald; Attendance: 5,243; Referee: Deniz Aytekin

6 May 2023 31	FC Hansa Rostock	2–0	Jahn Regensburg	Rostock
13:00 CEST (UTC+2)	Pröger 34'; Verhoek 80'	Report		Stadium: Ostseestadion; Attendance: 25,000; Referee: Frank Willenborg

14 May 2023 32	Jahn Regensburg	1–5	Hamburger SV	Regensburg
13:30 CEST (UTC+2)	Caliskaner 55'	Report	Glatzel 5'; Kittel 17' (pen.), 45+1'; Muheim 30'; Bilbija 81'	Stadium: Jahnstadion Regensburg; Attendance: 15,210 (sell-out); Referee: Alexander Sather

20 May 2023 33	Eintracht Braunschweig	1–2	Jahn Regensburg	Braunschweig
13:00 CEST (UTC+2)	Pherai 2'	Report	Makridis 21'; Owusu 49'	Stadium: Eintracht-Stadion; Attendance: 20,267; Referee: Max Burda

28 May 2023 34	Jahn Regensburg	2–3	1. FC Heidenheim	Regensburg
15:30 CET (UTC+1)	Owusu 51', 56'	Report	Saller 58' (o.g.); Beste 90+3' (pen.); Kleindienst 90+9'	Stadium: Jahnstadion; Attendance: 14,189; Referee: Sören Storks

=== DFB-Pokal ===
30 July 2022 First round	Jahn Regensburg	2–2 (a.e.t.) (4–3 p)	1. FC Köln	Regensburg
15:31 CEST (UTC+2)	Albers 18'; Owusu 27'	Report	Uth 28'; [[Dejan Ljubičić]Ljubičić]] 63'	Stadium: Jahnstadion Regensburg; Attendance: 13,236; Referee: Felix Brych

19 October 2022 Second round	Jahn Regensburg	0–3	Fortuna Düsseldorf	Regensburg
20:45 CEST (UTC+2)		Report	Peterson 5'; Kownacki 16'; Iyoha 53'	Stadium: Jahnstadion Regensburg; Attendance: 7,892; Referee: Timo Gerach

== Statistics ==
As of 5 August 2023.

No.	Pos	Nat	Player	Total		2. Liga		DFB-Pokal	
No.	Pos	Nat	Player	Apps	Goals	Apps	Goals	Apps	Goals
1	GK	(Austria) AUT	Dejan Stojanović	16	0	14	0	2	0
5	MF	(Germany) GER	Benedikt Gimber	24	1	23	1	1	0
6	DF	(Germany) GER	Benedikt Saller	20	0	18	0	2	0
7	MF	(Germany) GER	Nicklas Shipnoski	21	1	20	1	1	0
8	MF	(Germany) GER	Maximilian Thalhammer	27	1	25	1	2	0
9	FW	(Germany) GER	Prince Osei Owusu	29	8	27	7	2	1
10	FW	(Germany) GER	Kaan Caliskaner	26	5	24	5	2	0
11	DF	(Germany) GER	Konrad Faber	22	0	21	0	1	0
12	FW	(Croatia) CRO	Dario Vizinger	10	0	9	0	1	0
14	MF	(Germany) GER	Blendi Idrizi	18	0	17	0	1	0
15	MF	(New Zealand) NZL	Sarpreet Singh	11	1	11	1	0	0
16	FW	(Germany) GER	Oscar Schönfelder	0	0	0	0	0	0
18	FW	(Germany) GER	Aygün Yıldırım	21	1	20	1	1	0
19	FW	(Denmark) DEN	Andreas Albers	31	7	29	6	2	1
20	DF	(The Gambia) GAM	Leon Guwara	18	0	17	0	1	0
21	GK	(Germany) GER	Thorsten Kirschbaum	3	0	3	0	0	0
22	FW	(Germany) GER	Minos Gouras	19	1	17	1	2	0
23	DF	(Germany) GER	Steve Breitkreuz	20	0	18	0	2	0
24	DF	(Canada) CAN	Scott Kennedy	19	0	18	0	1	0
25	MF	(Germany) GER	Björn Zempelin	0	0	0	0	0	0
26	FW	(Germany) GER	Charalambos Makridis	22	2	20	2	2	0
27	DF	(Germany) GER	Lasse Günther	15	0	14	0	1	0
28	DF	(Germany) GER	Sebastian Nachreiner	9	0	9	0	0	0
29	FW	(Germany) GER	Joshua Mees	25	1	23	1	2	0
30	MF	(Germany) GER	Christian Viet	18	0	17	0	1	0
32	GK	(Germany) GER	Alexander Weidinger	0	0	0	0	0	0
33	DF	(Switzerland) SUI	Jan Elvedi	30	1	28	1	2	0
40	GK	(Germany) GER	Jonas Urbig	12	0	12	0	0	0
