= 2021–22 SSV Jahn Regensburg season =

SSV Jahn Regensburg
2021–22 season
- Chairman: Hans Rothammer
- Coach: Mersad Selimbegović
- Stadium: Jahnstadion Regensburg
- 2. Bundesliga: 15th
- DFB-Pokal: Second round
- Top goalscorer: League: Andreas Albers (9); All: Andreas Albers (10)
- Highest home attendance: 13,252
- Lowest home attendance: 3,412
- Average home league attendance: 6763
- Biggest win: 3–0 vs. SV Sandhausen, Holstein Kiel and FC Ingolstadt
- Biggest defeat: 0–3 vs. 1. FC Heidenheim
Home colours	Away colours	Third colours
- All statistics correct as of 19:09, 19 May 2022 (UTC).

The 2021–22 SSV Jahn Regensburg season is the 115th season in the club's football history. This was the club's fourth consecutive season in the 2. Bundesliga, the second tier of German football, following promotion from the 3. Liga in 2016–17.

The club also competed in the 2021–22 edition of the DFB-Pokal.

== Transfers ==
=== In ===
No.	Pos	Player	Transferred from	Transfer Type	Fee	Date	Contract ends	Source
8	FW	Aygün Yıldırım	SC Verl	Unknown	Unknown	1 July 2021	30 June 2023	
21	GK	Thorsten Kirschbaum	VVV-Venlo	Unknown	Unknown	1 July 2021	30 June 2023	
11	MF	Konrad Faber	SC Freiburg II	Unknown	Unknown	1 July 2021	30 June 2023	
37	MF	Björn Zempelin	SSV Jahn Regensburg II	N/A	N/A	1 July 2021	30 June 2023	
20	DF	Leon Guwara	VVV-Venlo	Unknown	Unknown	1 July 2021	30 June 2023	
23	DF	Steve Breitkreuz	FC Erzgebirge Aue	Free transfer	None	1 July 2021	30 June 2023	
22	MF	Carlo Boukhalfa	SC Freiburg II	Loan	Unknown	1 July 2021	30 June 2022	
15	MF	Sarpreet Singh	FC Bayern Munich	Loan	Unknown	1 July 2021	30 June 2022	
27	FW	Joël Zwarts	SBV Excelsior	unknown	Unknown	1 July 2021	30 June 2024	
32	GK	Alexander Weidinger	SpVgg Unterhaching	Loan ended	Unknown	7 January 2022	30 June 2023	
9	FW	Nicklas Shipnoski	Fortuna Düsseldorf	Loan	Unknown	31 January 2022	30 June 2023	

=== Out ===
No.	Pos	Player	Transferred to	Transfer Type	Fee	Date	Source
17	MF	Oliver Hein	End of career	N/A	N/A	30 June 2021	
22	MF	Sebastian Stolze	Hannover 96	Free transfer	None	30 June 2021	
21	FW	Jan-Marc Schneider	PAS Giannina	Free transfer	None	30 June 2021	
27	MF	Aaron Opoku	Unknown	Loan ended	N/A	30 June 2021	
8	FW	Albion Vrenezi	Türkgücü München	Free transfer	None	30 June 2021	
31	DF	Tom Baack	SC Verl	Loan	Unknown	30 June 2021	
11	MF	Florian Heister	FC Viktoria Köln	Unknown	Unknown	30 June 2021	
32	GK	Alexander Weidinger	SpVgg Unterhaching	Loan	Unknown	30 June 2021	
20	DF	Federico Palacios	FC Viktoria Köln	Unknown	Unknown	30 June 2021	
16	DF	Markus Palionis	SSV Jahn Regensburg II	N/A	N/A	30 June 2021	
23	MF	Nicolas Wähling	SSV Ulm 1846	Unknown	Unknown	30 June 2021	
9	MF	Jann George	FC Erzgebirge Aue	Unknown	Unknown	4 January 2022	
29	FW	André Becker	Würzburger Kickers	Loan	Unknown	22 January 2022	

== Pre-season and friendlies ==
Win Draw Loss Fixtures

Date	Kickoff^{A}	Venue	City	Opponent	Res.^{B}	Att.	Goalscorers		Ref.
Date	Kickoff^{A}	Venue	City	Opponent	Res.^{B}	Att.	SSV Jahn Regensburg	Opponent	Ref.
26 June 2021	17:00	Sportpark am Kaulbachweg	Regensburg	FC Blau-Weiß Linz	4–0		Otto 45+1'; Boukhalfa 48'; George 53'; Becker 87'		
3 July 2021	14:00	Sportpark am Kaulbachweg	Regensburg	SpVgg Bayreuth	4–0		Gimber 17'; Albers 47'; Caliskaner 58'; Fischer 77'		
9 July 2021	18:00		Ried	SV Ried	2–0	1000	Gimber 20'; Besuschkow 24'		
10 July 2021	16:00		Holzkirchen	FC Wacker Innsbruck	2–2		Fischer 16'; Caliskaner 90'	Fridrikas 14'; Soares 68'	
16 July 2021	13:00		Schalding-Heining	FC Slovan Liberec	1–0		Albers 88' (pen.)		
17 July 2021	15:30	Sportpark am Kaulbachweg	Regensburg	Türkgücü München	1–0	300	Becker 64'		
2 September 2021	13:30	Sportpark am Kaulbachweg	Regensburg	SpVgg Greuther Fürth	1–2		Caliskaner	Itten 45'; Hrgota 87'	
7 October 2021	15:00		Augsburg	FC Augsburg	0–1	0		Sarenren Bazee 67'	
11 November 2021	15:00	Sportpark am Kaulbachweg	Regensburg	FC Erzgebirge Aue	3–1	ca. 100	Otto 12', 20'; Nachreiner 50'	Mance 31'	
8 January 2022	13:30	Merck-Stadion am Böllenfalltor	Darmstadt	SV Darmstadt 98	2–4	249	Breitkreuz 18'; Otto 90'	Skarke 14'; Gjasula 30'; Tietz 41'; Goller 76'	
27 January 2022	14:00		Augsburg	FC Augsburg	3–3	0	Makridis 9', 35'; Caliskaner 90'	Niederlechner 12'; Vargas 26'; Gregoritsch 69'	
25 March 2022	13:00	Sportpark am Kaulbachweg	Regensburg	SpVgg Greuther Fürth	0–3			Itter 16'; Green 45+2'; Pululu 47'	

== 2. Bundesliga ==
=== 2. Bundesliga fixtures & results ===
Win Draw Loss Postponed

MD	Date Kickoff^{A}	H/A	Opponent	Res.^{B} F–A	Att.	Goalscorers		Table		Ref.
MD	Date Kickoff^{A}	H/A	Opponent	Res.^{B} F–A	Att.	SSV Jahn Regensburg	Opponent	Pos.	Pts.	Ref.
1	24 July 2021 13:30	A	SV Darmstadt 98	2–0	4500	Singh 21'; Gimber 61'		5	3	
2	31 July 2021 13:30	H	SV Sandhausen	3–0	5018	Boukhalfa 34'; Kennedy 70'; Zwarts 82'		2	6	
3	14 August 2021 13:30	A	Holstein Kiel	3–0	3700	Besuschkow 20'; Gimber 40'; Korb 58' (o.g.)		1	9	
4	21 August 2021 13:30	H	FC Schalke 04	4–1	5324	Beste 8'; Breitkreuz 55'; Otto 73'; Singh 86'	Terodde 81'	1	12	
5	29 August 2021 13:30	A	FC St. Pauli	0–2	10,003 (sell-out)		Burgstaller 74', 89'	1	12	
6	12 September 2021 13:30	H	1. FC Nürnberg	2–2	10,105 (sell-out)	Besuschkow 38'; Wekesser 53'	Tempelmann 20'; Dovedan 79'	1	13	
7	18 September 2021 13:30	A	Fortuna Düsseldorf	1–1	19,256	Besuschkow 18'	Boženík 33'	2	14	
8	24 September 2021 13:30	H	FC Erzgebirge Aue	3–2	8,127	Beste 7'; Besuschkow 11'; Albers 90'	Kühn 52'; Bussmann 87'	1	17	
9	2 October 2021 13:30	A	Karlsruher SC	1–1	8,790	Albers 56' (pen.); Gimber 58'	Wanitzek 14'; Thiede 51'	2	18	
10	15 October 2021 18:30	A	SC Paderborn 07	1–1	7,913	Makridis 2'	Pröger 71'	2	19	
11	24 October 2021 13:30	H	Hannover 96	3–1	8,462	Singh 17'; Boukhalfa 22'; Zwarts 90+2'	Kerk 54'	2	22	
12	31 October 2021 13:30	A	FC Ingolstadt 04	3–0	7,024	Otto 9'; Besuschkow 63' (pen.); Caliskaner 73'		2	25	
13	6 November 2021 13:30	H	FC Hansa Rostock	2–3	8,618	Singh 34'; Makridis 90'	Verhoek 43', 52'; Behrens 49'	2	25	
14	20 November 2021 13:30	A	Hamburger SV	1–4	23,505	Beste 33'	Reis 31'; Alidou 45'; Kittel 65'; Suhonen 87'	4	25	
15	26 November 2021 18:30	H	Dynamo Dresden	3–1	3,412	Saller 34'; Caliskaner 80'; Makridis 82'	Daferner 47'	3	28	
16	5 December 2021 13:30	A	1. FC Heidenheim	0–3	750 (sell-out)		Kühlwetter 23'; Leipertz 77'; Schöppner 90+1'	3	28	
17	10 December 2021 18:30	H	SV Werder Bremen	2–3	0	Breitkreuz 5'; Singh 90+2'	Bittencourt 39'; Friedl 59'; Ducksch 89'	5	28	
18	19 December 2021 13:30	H	SV Darmstadt 98	0–2	0		Karic 70'; Kempe 90+3'	8	28	
19	16 January 2022 13:30	A	SV Sandhausen	3–0	500 (sell-out)	Breitkreuz 11'; Guwara 33'; Boukhalfa 52'		7	31	
20	23 January 2022 13:30	H	Holstein Kiel	1–2	0	Kennedy 12'	Korb 35'; Mühling 59' (pen.)	8	31	
21	5 February 2022 13:30	A	FC Schalke 04	1–2	10,000 (sell-out)	Albers 32'	Terodde 64'; Thiaw 73'	9	31	
22	12 February 2022 20:30	H	FC St. Pauli	2–3	7,605 (sell-out)	Albers 56'; Otto 73'	Amenyido 7'; Burgstaller 11'; Kyereh 66'	10	31	
23	19 February 2022 20:30	A	1. FC Nürnberg	0–2	23,042		Köpke 35'; Duman 55'	10	31	
24	27 February 2022 13:30	H	Fortuna Düsseldorf	0–0	6,319			10	32	
25	6 March 2022 13:30	A	FC Erzgebirge Aue	0–1	6,268		Owusu 23'	10	32	
26	13 March 2022 13:30	H	Karlsruher SC	1–1	13,258	Beste 31'	Hofmann 70'	10	33	
27	20 March 2022 13:30	H	SC Paderborn 07	1–0	7,680	Albers 66'		10	36	
28	2 April 2022 13:30	A	Hannover 96	1–1	9,200	Albers 23'	Stolze 39'	10	37	
29	8 April 2022 18:30	H	FC Ingolstadt 04	1–1	12,089	Albers 56'	Guwara 36' (o.g.)	10	38	
30	17 April 2022 13:30	A	FC Hansa Rostock	1–1	26,000	Shipnoski 59'	Verhoek 44'	9	39	
31	23 April 2022 13:30	H	Hamburger SV	2–4	13,252	Boukhalfa 46'; Albers 56'	Muheim 23'; Suhonen 66'; Vagnoman 90'; Kinsombi 90+6'	10	39	
32	30 April 2022 13:30	A	Dynamo Dresden	1–1	20,376	Albers 88'	Daferner 73'	11	40	
33	7 May 2022 13:30	H	1. FC Heidenheim	0–2	10,175		Mainka 51'; Mohr 82'	13	40	
34	15 May 2022 15:30	A	SV Werder Bremen	0–2	41,000 (sell-out)		Füllkrug 10'; Ducksch 51'	15	40	

==== League table ====
Pos	Team	Pld	W	D	L	GF	GA	GD	Pts	Promotion, qualification or relegation
13	Hansa Rostock	34	10	11	13	41	52	−11	41	
14	SV Sandhausen	34	10	11	13	42	54	−12	41	
15	Jahn Regensburg	34	10	10	14	50	51	−1	40	
16	Dynamo Dresden (R)	34	7	11	16	33	46	−13	32	Qualification for relegation play-offs
17	Erzgebirge Aue (R)	34	6	8	20	32	72	−40	26	Relegation to 3. Liga

Source: DFB
Rules for classification: 1) Points; 2) Goal difference; 3) Goals scored; 4) Head-to-head points; 5) Head-to-head goal difference; 6) Head-to-head away goals scored; 7) Away goals scored; 8) Play-off.
(R) Relegated

== DFB-Pokal ==
Win Draw Loss Postponed

RD	Date	Kickoff^{A}	Venue	City	Opponent	Result^{B}	Attendance	Goalscorers		Ref.
RD	Date	Kickoff^{A}	Venue	City	Opponent	Result^{B}	Attendance	SSV Jahn Regensburg	Opponent	Ref.
First round	8 August 2021	15:30	Stadion Oberwerth	Koblenz	TuS Rot-Weiß Koblenz	3–0	1350	Beste 27'; Albers 31'; Besuschkow 47'		
Second round	27 October 2021	20:45	Jahnstadion Regensburg	Regensburg	FC Hansa Rostock	3–3 (a.e.t.) (2–4 p)	7,360	Singh 71'; Zwarts 90+1'; Breitkreuz 101'	Riedel 9'; Mamba 56'; Breier 120+1'	

== Statistics ==
As of 19 May 2022.

No.	Pos	Nat	Player	Total		2. Liga		DFB-Pokal	
No.	Pos	Nat	Player	Apps	Goals	Apps	Goals	Apps	Goals
1	GK	(Germany) GER	Alexander Meyer	33	0	31	0	2	0
4	DF	(Germany) GER	Jan-Niklas Beste	28	5	26	4	2	1
5	DF	(Germany) GER	Benedikt Gimber	32	3	30	3	2	0
6	MF	(Germany) GER	Benedikt Saller	31	1	30	1	1	0
7	MF	(Germany) GER	Max Besuschkow	35	6	33	5	2	1
8	FW	(Germany) GER	Aygün Yıldırım	16	0	16	0	0	0
9	MF	(Germany) GER	Jann George	4	0	3	0	1	0
9	FW	(Germany) GER	Nicklas Shipnoski	13	1	13	1	0	0
10	FW	(Germany) GER	Kaan Caliskaner	18	2	17	2	1	0
11	MF	(Germany) GER	Konrad Faber	29	0	27	0	2	0
13	FW	(Germany) GER	Erik Wekesser	33	1	31	1	2	0
14	FW	(Germany) GER	David Otto	22	3	20	3	2	0
15	MF	(New Zealand) NZL	Sarpreet Singh	27	6	25	5	2	1
18	MF	(Germany) GER	Christoph Moritz	4	0	4	0	0	0
19	FW	(Denmark) DEN	Andreas Albers	34	10	32	9	2	1
20	DF	(The Gambia) GAM	Leon Guwara	19	1	18	1	1	0
21	GK	(Germany) GER	Thorsten Kirschbaum	3	0	3	0	0	0
22	MF	(Germany) GER	Carlo Boukhalfa	33	4	31	4	2	0
23	DF	(Germany) GER	Steve Breitkreuz	31	4	29	3	2	1
24	DF	(Canada) CAN	Scott Kennedy	24	2	23	2	1	0
26	FW	(Germany) GER	Charalambos Makridis	27	3	26	3	1	0
27	FW	(Netherlands) NED	Joël Zwarts	25	3	23	2	2	1
28	DF	(Germany) GER	Sebastian Nachreiner	12	0	10	0	2	0
29	FW	(Germany) GER	André Becker	2	0	2	0	0	0
30	GK	(Germany) GER	Kevin Kunz	0	0	0	0	0	0
32	GK	(Germany) GER	Alexander Weidinger	1	0	1	0	0	0
33	DF	(Switzerland) SUI	Jan Elvedi	23	0	23	0	0	0
37	MF	(Germany) GER	Björn Zempelin	2	0	2	0	0	0
