= 2021–22 DFB-Pokal =

Tournament details
- Country: Germany
- Venue(s): Olympiastadion, Berlin
- Dates: 6 August 2021 – 21 May 2022
- Teams: 64

Final positions
- Champions: RB Leipzig (1st title)
- Runners-up: SC Freiburg

Tournament statistics
- Matches played: 63
- Goals scored: 217 (3.44 per match)
- Attendance: 684,039 (10,858 per match)
- Top goal scorer(s): Robert Glatzel (5 goals)
- Goals scored in penalty shoot-outs not included.

The 2021–22 DFB-Pokal was the 79th season of the annual German football cup competition. Sixty-four teams participated in the competition, including all teams from the previous year's Bundesliga and 2. Bundesliga. The competition began on 6 August 2021 with the first of six rounds and ended on 21 May 2022 with the final at the Olympiastadion in Berlin, a nominally neutral venue, which has hosted the final since 1985. The DFB-Pokal is considered the second-most important club title in German football after the Bundesliga championship. The DFB-Pokal is run by the German Football Association (DFB).

Bundesliga side Borussia Dortmund were the defending champions, having defeated RB Leipzig 4–1 in the previous final to clinch their fifth title, but lost to FC St. Pauli in the round of 16. RB Leipzig's win over SC Freiburg in this year's edition marked the first East German victory since the reunification of Germany.

As Leipzig already qualified for the 2022–23 edition of the UEFA Champions League through their position in the Bundesliga, the UEFA Europa League group stage spot reserved for the cup winners went to the sixth-placed team, and the league's UEFA Europa Conference League play-off round spot to the seventh-placed team. As winners, Leipzig hosted the 2022 edition of the DFL-Supercup at the start of the next season, and faced the champion of the 2021–22 Bundesliga, Bayern Munich.

== Participating clubs ==
The following teams qualified for the competition:

Bundesliga the 18 clubs of the 2020–21 season	2. Bundesliga; the 18 clubs of the 2020–21 season	3. Liga; the top 4 clubs of the 2020–21 season
FC Augsburg; Hertha BSC; Union Berlin; Arminia Bielefeld; Werder Bremen; Borussia Dortmund; Eintracht Frankfurt; SC Freiburg; 1899 Hoffenheim; 1. FC Köln; RB Leipzig; Bayer Leverkusen; Mainz 05; Borussia Mönchengladbach; Bayern Munich; Schalke 04; VfB Stuttgart; VfL Wolfsburg	Erzgebirge Aue; VfL Bochum; Eintracht Braunschweig; Darmstadt 98; Fortuna Düsseldorf; Greuther Fürth; Hamburger SV; Hannover 96; 1. FC Heidenheim; Karlsruher SC; Holstein Kiel; 1. FC Nürnberg; VfL Osnabrück; SC Paderborn; Jahn Regensburg; SV Sandhausen; FC St. Pauli; Würzburger Kickers	Dynamo Dresden; Hansa Rostock; FC Ingolstadt; 1860 Munich
Representatives of the regional associations 24 representatives of 21 regional associations of the DFB, qualified (in general) through the 2020–21 Verbandspokal (Note: The three regions with the most participating teams in their league competitions (Bavaria, Lower Saxony, and Westphalia) were allowed to enter two teams for the competition.)
Baden: Waldhof Mannheim; Bavaria (Note: In addition to the Bavarian Cup winners, the winners of the Bavarian Regional League Cup also qualified.): Türkgücü München (CW); SpVgg Bayreuth (LC); Berlin: BFC Dynamo (Note: The Berlin Football Association registered BFC Dynamo for the DFB-Pokal; however, on 1 July 2021, another club, later revealed to be Blau-Weiß Berlin, filed an appeal against this decision with the DFB Federal Court. The appeal was turned down on 26 July 2021, allowing BFC Dynamo to participate in the DFB-Pokal.); Brandenburg: SV Babelsberg; Bremen: Bremer SV; Hamburg: Eintracht Norderstedt; Hesse: Wehen Wiesbaden	Lower Rhine: Wuppertaler SV; Lower Saxony (Note: The Lower Saxony Cup was split into two paths: one for 3. Liga and Regionalliga Nord teams, and the other for amateur teams. The winners of each path qualified.): SV Meppen (3L/RL); VfL Oldenburg (Am.) (Note: The amateurs' path of the Lower Saxony Cup was abandoned on 19 May 2021. VfL Oldenburg was awarded the DFB-Pokal berth after a draw between the remaining participants.); Mecklenburg-Vorpommern: Greifswalder FC (Note: The Mecklenburg-Vorpommern Cup was abandoned on 20 May 2021. The Mecklenburg-Vorpommern State Football Association entered the second-best-ranked team, Greifswalder FC, in the DFB-Pokal since the best-ranked team, Hansa Rostock, had already qualified through their 3. Liga position.); Middle Rhine: Viktoria Köln; Rhineland: Rot-Weiß Koblenz (Note: The Rhineland Cup was completed on 24 July 2021, after the DFB-Pokal registration deadline. Therefore, a "qualification match" was played between Rot-Weiß Koblenz, the best-ranked remaining team, and VfB Linz, who were drawn from the other remaining participants.); Saarland: SV Elversberg; Saxony: Lokomotive Leipzig	Saxony-Anhalt: 1. FC Magdeburg (Note: On 24 April 2021, the Saxony-Anhalt Cup was paused and continued in 2021–22 starting with the round of 16. The 3. Liga teams Hallescher FC and 1. FC Magdeburg played a "qualification match" to determine the DFB-Pokal participant. On 28 May 2021, this decision was overturned by the association court. The dispute was settled on 23 June 2021, allowing Magdeburg to participate in the DFB-Pokal.); Schleswig-Holstein: Weiche Flensburg; South Baden: FC 08 Villingen; Southwest: 1. FC Kaiserslautern (Note: The Southwestern Cup was abandoned on 14 June 2021. The Southwest German Football Association entered the best-ranked team, 1. FC Kaiserslautern, in the DFB-Pokal.); Thuringia: Carl Zeiss Jena; Westphalia (Note: In addition to the Westphalian Cup winners, the best-placed Westphalian team of the Regionalliga West also qualified.): Sportfreunde Lotte (CW) (Note: Sportfreunde Lotte qualified regardless of the outcome of the final of the Westphalian Cup, as Preußen Münster, the other finalists, already qualified for the DFB-Pokal through their Regionalliga West position.); Preußen Münster (RL); Württemberg: SSV Ulm

== Format ==
=== Participation ===
The DFB-Pokal began with a round of 64 teams. The 36 teams of the Bundesliga and 2. Bundesliga, along with the top four finishers of the 3. Liga, were automatically qualified for the tournament. Of the remaining slots, 21 were given to the cup winners of the regional football associations, the Verbandspokal. The three remaining slots were given to the three regional associations with the most men's teams, which were Bavaria, Lower Saxony, and Westphalia. The best-placed amateur team of the Regionalliga Bayern was given the spot for Bavaria. For Lower Saxony, the Lower Saxony Cup was split into two paths: one for 3. Liga and Regionalliga Nord teams, and the other for amateur teams. The winners of each path qualified. For Westphalia, the best-placed team of the Regionalliga West also qualified. As every team was entitled to participate in local tournaments which qualified for the association cups, every team could in principle compete in the DFB-Pokal. Reserve teams and combined football sections were not permitted to enter, along with no two teams of the same association or corporation.

=== Draw ===
The draws for the different rounds were conducted as follows:

For the first round, the participating teams were split into two pots of 32 teams each. The first pot contained all teams which qualified through their regional cup competitions, the best four teams of the 3. Liga, and the bottom four teams of the 2. Bundesliga. Every team from this pot was drawn to a team from the second pot, which contained all remaining professional teams (all the teams of the Bundesliga and the remaining fourteen 2. Bundesliga teams). The teams from the first pot were set as the home team in the process.

The two-pot scenario was also applied for the second round, with the remaining 3. Liga and/or amateur team(s) in the first pot and the remaining Bundesliga and 2. Bundesliga teams in the other pot. Once again, the 3. Liga and/or amateur team(s) served as hosts. This time the pots did not have to be of equal size though, depending on the results of the first round. Theoretically, it was even possible that there could be only one pot, if all of the teams from one of the pots from the first round had beat all the others in the second pot. Once one pot was empty, the remaining pairings were drawn from the other pot, with the first-drawn team for a match serving as hosts.

For the remaining rounds, the draw was conducted from just one pot. Any remaining 3. Liga and/or amateur team(s) were the home team if drawn against a professional team. In every other case, the first-drawn team served as hosts.

=== Match rules ===
Teams met in one game per round. Matches took place for 90 minutes, with two halves of 45 minutes each. If still tied after regulation, 30 minutes of extra time were played, consisting of two periods of 15 minutes each. If the score was still level after this, the match was decided by a penalty shoot-out. A coin toss would decide who took the first penalty. A maximum of nine players could be listed on the substitute bench, while a maximum of five substitutions were allowed. However, each team was only given three opportunities to make substitutions, with a fourth opportunity in extra time, excluding substitutions made at half-time, before the start of extra time and at half-time in extra time. From the round of 16 onward, a video assistant referee was appointed for all DFB-Pokal matches. Though technically possible, VAR was not used for home matches of Bundesliga clubs prior to the round of 16 in order to provide a uniform approach to all matches.

=== Suspensions ===
If a player received five yellow cards in the competition, he was then suspended from the next cup match. Similarly, receiving a second yellow card suspended a player from the next cup match. If a player received a direct red card, they were suspended a minimum of one match, but the German Football Association reserved the right to increase the suspension.

=== Champion qualification ===
The winners of the DFB-Pokal earned automatic qualification for the group stage of next year's edition of the UEFA Europa League. If they had already qualified for the UEFA Champions League through position in the Bundesliga, then the spot would go to the team in sixth place, and the league's second qualifying round spot would go to the team in seventh place. The winners also hosted the DFL-Supercup at the start of the next season, and faced the champions of the previous year's Bundesliga, unless the same team won the Bundesliga and the DFB-Pokal, completing a double. In that case, the runners-up of the Bundesliga would take the spot and host instead.

== Schedule ==
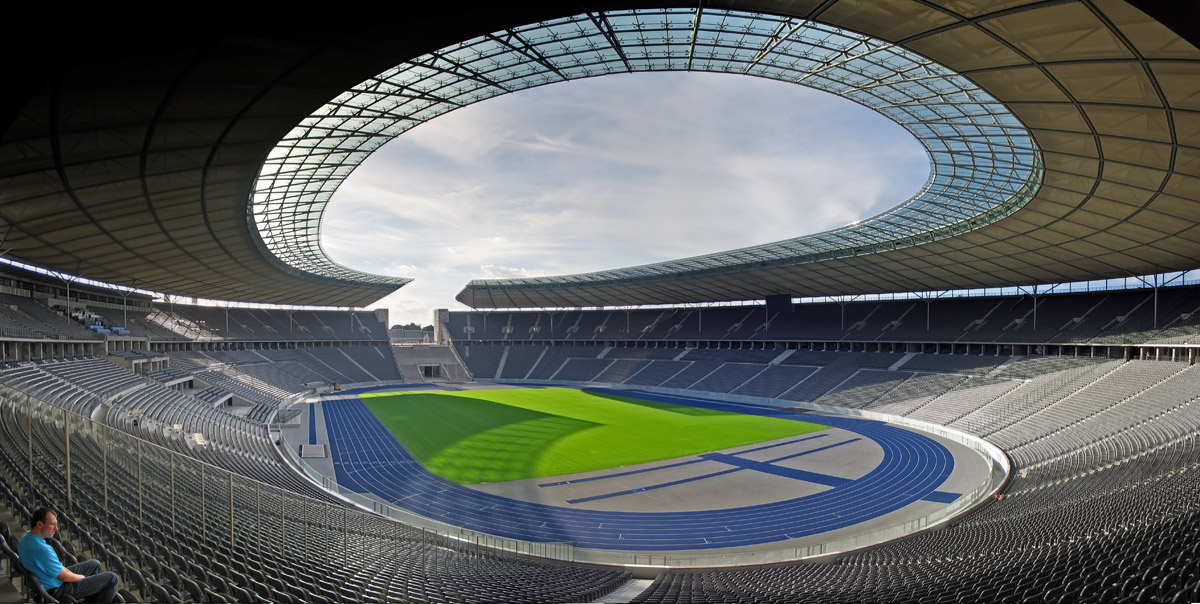
The Olympiastadion in Berlin hosted the final.

All draws were held at the German Football Museum in Dortmund, on a Sunday evening at 18:00 after each round (unless noted otherwise). The draws were televised on ARD's Sportschau, broadcast on Das Erste. From the quarter-finals onwards, the draw for the DFB-Pokal Frauen also took place at the same time.

The rounds of the 2021–22 competition were scheduled as follows:

Round	Draw date	Matches
First round	4 July 2021	6–9 August 2021 (Note: Due to special circumstances, one match was played on 25 August 2021.)
Second round	29 August 2021 (Note: Originally scheduled for 15 August 2021.)	26–27 October 2021
Round of 16	31 October 2021	18–19 January 2022
Quarter-finals	30 January 2022	1–2 March 2022
Semi-finals	6 March 2022	19–20 April 2022
Final	6 March 2022	21 May 2022 at Olympiastadion, Berlin

== Matches ==
A total of sixty-three matches took place, starting with the first round on 6 August 2021 and culminating with the final on 21 May 2022 at the Olympiastadion in Berlin.

Times up to 30 October 2021 and from 27 March 2022 are CEST (UTC+2). Times from 31 October 2021 to 26 March 2022 are CET (UTC+1).

=== First round ===
The draw for the first round was held on 4 July 2021 at 18:30, with Thomas Broich drawing the matches. The thirty-two matches took place from 6 to 25 August 2021.

6 August 2021	Dynamo Dresden	2–1	SC Paderborn	Dresden
20:45	Knipping 54'; Kade 88'	Report	Michel 60'	Stadium: Rudolf-Harbig-Stadion; Attendance: 12,702; Referee: Christof Günsch

6 August 2021	1860 Munich	1–1 (a.e.t.) (5–4 p)	Darmstadt 98	Munich
20:45	Steinhart 75'	Report	Pfeiffer 80'	Stadium: Grünwalder Stadion; Attendance: 4,158; Referee: Tobias Reichel
	Penalties
	Steinhart (penalty scored); Tallig (penalty scored); Dressel (penalty scored); Staude (penalty scored); Salger (penalty scored)		(penalty missed) Pfeiffer; (penalty scored) Holland; (penalty scored) Schnellhardt; (penalty scored) Manu; (penalty scored) Tietz

7 August 2021	Weiche Flensburg	2–4 (a.e.t.)	Holstein Kiel	Flensburg
15:30	Herrmann 104', 110'	Report	Arp 94' (pen.); Sander 105'; Reese 120'; Bartels 120+2'	Stadium: Manfred-Werner-Stadion; Attendance: 1,700; Referee: Frank Willenborg

7 August 2021	Lokomotive Leipzig	0–3	Bayer Leverkusen	Leipzig
15:30		Report	Demirbay 5' (pen.), 87'; Bellarabi 14'	Stadium: Bruno-Plache-Stadion; Attendance: 6,185; Referee: Florian Lechner

7 August 2021	SV Sandhausen	0–4	RB Leipzig	Sandhausen
15:30		Report	Orbán 19'; Haidara 45'; Nkunku 59'; Szoboszlai 81'	Stadium: BWT-Stadion am Hardtwald; Attendance: 4,067; Referee: Daniel Schlager

7 August 2021	SpVgg Bayreuth	3–6	Arminia Bielefeld	Bayreuth
15:30	Knežević 14'; Maderer 52'; Nilsson 68' (o.g.)	Report	Laursen 11'; Klos 28'; Lasme 51', 85'; Nilsson 73'; Kunze 79'	Stadium: Hans-Walter-Wild-Stadion; Attendance: 5,000; Referee: Robert Hartmann

7 August 2021	Greifswalder FC	2–4	FC Augsburg	Greifswald
15:30	Knechtel 2'; Jovanović 69'	Report	Winther 41'; Niederlechner 52'; Jensen 68'; Hahn 80'	Stadium: Volksstadion Greifswald; Attendance: 4,000; Referee: Max Burda

7 August 2021	VfL Osnabrück	2–0	Werder Bremen	Osnabrück
15:30	Trapp 45'; Köhler 90+6'	Report		Stadium: Stadion an der Bremer Brücke; Attendance: 5,341; Referee: Patrick Ittrich

7 August 2021	Eintracht Norderstedt	0–4	Hannover 96	Norderstedt
15:30		Report	Ochs 20'; Ducksch 45+1' (pen.), 63'; Muslija 65'	Stadium: Edmund-Plambeck-Stadion; Attendance: 745; Referee: Matthias Jöllenbeck

7 August 2021	Wuppertaler SV	1–2 (a.e.t.)	VfL Bochum	Wuppertal
15:30	Šarić 22'	Report	Zoller 53'; Tesche 111'	Stadium: Stadion am Zoo; Attendance: 4,490; Referee: Patrick Alt

7 August 2021	BFC Dynamo	0–6	VfB Stuttgart	Berlin
15:30		Report	Al Ghaddioui 26'; Sosa 45+1'; Mavropanos 53'; Klimowicz 68'; Sankoh 82'; Churlinov 88'	Stadium: Stadion im Sportforum; Attendance: 3,500; Referee: Eric Müller

7 August 2021	SSV Ulm	0–1	1. FC Nürnberg	Ulm
18:30		Report	Duman 79'	Stadium: Donaustadion; Attendance: 6,743; Referee: Michael Bacher

7 August 2021	SV Babelsberg	2–2 (a.e.t.) (5–4 p)	Greuther Fürth	Potsdam
18:30	Rausch 37'; Hoffmann 70'	Report	Hrgota 22' (pen.); Green 85'	Stadium: Karl-Liebknecht-Stadion; Attendance: 3,030; Referee: Robin Braun
	Penalties
	Frahn (penalty scored); Wegener (penalty scored); Lela (penalty missed); Reimann (penalty scored); Moravec (penalty scored); Danko (penalty scored)		(penalty scored) Green; (penalty scored) Seguin; (penalty missed) Hrgota; (penalty scored) Barry; (penalty scored) Sarpei; (penalty missed) Bauer

7 August 2021	1. FC Magdeburg	2–3	FC St. Pauli	Magdeburg
18:30	Conteh 31', 54'	Report	Burgstaller 3', 58'; Medić 40'	Stadium: MDCC-Arena; Attendance: 15,000; Referee: Robert Schröder

7 August 2021	Wehen Wiesbaden	0–3	Borussia Dortmund	Wiesbaden
20:45		Report	Haaland 26', 31' (pen.), 51'	Stadium: BRITA-Arena; Attendance: 4,882; Referee: Benjamin Cortus

8 August 2021	SV Meppen	0–1	Hertha BSC	Meppen
15:30		Report	Selke 90+1'	Stadium: Hänsch-Arena; Attendance: 6,000; Referee: Robert Kampka

8 August 2021	SV Elversberg	2–2 (a.e.t.) (7–8 p)	Mainz 05	Spiesen-Elversberg
15:30	Schnellbacher 73', 110'	Report	Burkardt 89', 116'	Stadium: Waldstadion an der Kaiserlinde; Attendance: 2,600; Referee: Thorben Siewer
	Penalties
	Schnellbacher (penalty scored); Fellhauer (penalty scored); Baumgärtel (penalty scored); Dragon (penalty scored); Conrad (penalty scored); Laprévotte (penalty scored); Müller (penalty scored); Von Piechowski (penalty missed)		(penalty scored) Niakhaté; (penalty scored) Stöger; (penalty scored) Boëtius; (penalty scored) Burkardt; (penalty scored) Brosinski; (penalty scored) Martín; (penalty scored) St. Juste; (penalty scored) Stach

8 August 2021	Carl Zeiss Jena	1–1 (a.e.t.) (2–4 p)	1. FC Köln	Jena
15:30	Wolfram 5'	Report	Skhiri 69'	Stadium: Ernst-Abbe-Sportfeld; Attendance: 2,728; Referee: Florian Badstübner
	Penalties
	Oesterhelweg (penalty missed); Bürger (penalty missed); Dedidis (penalty scored); Lange (penalty scored)		(penalty scored) Lemperle; (penalty scored) Schaub; (penalty scored) Thielmann; (penalty scored) Duda

8 August 2021	FC Villingen	1–4	Schalke 04	Villingen-Schwenningen
15:30	Plavci 31'	Report	Bülter 17', 51'; Zalazar 49'; Mikhailov 79'	Stadium: MS-Technologie-Arena; Attendance: 4,992; Referee: Wolfgang Haslberger

8 August 2021	Waldhof Mannheim	2–0	Eintracht Frankfurt	Mannheim
15:30	Seegert 48'; Boyamba 52'	Report		Stadium: Carl-Benz-Stadion; Attendance: 11,000; Referee: Sascha Stegemann

8 August 2021	Rot-Weiß Koblenz	0–3	Jahn Regensburg	Koblenz
15:30		Report	Beste 27'; Albers 31'; Besuschkow 68'	Stadium: Stadion Oberwerth; Attendance: 1,350; Referee: Mitja Stegemann

8 August 2021	Türkgücü München	0–1	Union Berlin	Munich
15:30		Report	Kruse 23'	Stadium: Grünwalder Stadion; Attendance: 2,500; Referee: Martin Petersen

8 August 2021	VfL Oldenburg	0–5	Fortuna Düsseldorf	Oldenburg (Note: The VfL Oldenburg v Fortuna Düsseldorf match took place at the Marschweg-Stadion instead of VfL Oldenburg's home stadium, the Stadion Alexanderstraße.)
15:30		Report	Henning 13', 61' (pen.); Abbes 23' (o.g.); Kownacki 26' (pen.); Shipnoski 70'	Stadium: Marschweg-Stadion; Attendance: 4,200; Referee: Sven Jablonski

8 August 2021	Preußen Münster	2–0 (awd.)	VfL Wolfsburg	Münster
15:30	Hoffmeier 74'	Report	Brekalo 90'; Weghorst 103'; Baku 120+1'	Stadium: Preußenstadion; Attendance: 6,703; Referee: Christian Dingert
Note: The match originally ended 1–3 for Wolfsburg after extra time. Wolfsburg used a total of six substitutes, while only five were allowed, and were disqualified after a protest by Preußen Münster.

8 August 2021	Eintracht Braunschweig	1–2	Hamburger SV	Braunschweig
18:30	Ihorst 44'	Report	Gyamerah 29'; Glatzel 68'	Stadium: Eintracht-Stadion; Attendance: 6,167; Referee: Tobias Welz

8 August 2021	Würzburger Kickers	0–1	SC Freiburg	Würzburg
18:30		Report	Schmid 45'	Stadium: Flyeralarm Arena; Attendance: 2,820; Referee: Benjamin Brand

8 August 2021	Hansa Rostock	3–2 (a.e.t.)	1. FC Heidenheim	Rostock
18:30	Mainka 57' (o.g.); Rizzuto 94'; Munsy 119'	Report	Mainka 25'; Schimmer 108'	Stadium: Ostseestadion; Attendance: 15,000; Referee: Arne Aarnink

9 August 2021	FC Ingolstadt	2–1	Erzgebirge Aue	Ingolstadt
18:30	Bilbija 6'; Kaya 79'	Report	Zolinski 67'	Stadium: Audi Sportpark; Attendance: 3,322; Referee: Daniel Siebert

9 August 2021	Viktoria Köln	2–3 (a.e.t.)	1899 Hoffenheim	Cologne
18:30	Handle 33'; Greger 102'	Report	Kramarić 27' (pen.), 107'; Dabbur 94'	Stadium: Sportpark Höhenberg; Attendance: 3,402; Referee: Franz Bokop

9 August 2021	Sportfreunde Lotte	1–4	Karlsruher SC	Lotte
18:30	Brauer 72'	Report	Schleusener 44'; Hofmann 50'; Kaufmann 58'; Cueto 79'	Stadium: Stadion am Lotter Kreuz; Attendance: 5,000; Referee: Riem Hussein

9 August 2021	1. FC Kaiserslautern	0–1	Borussia Mönchengladbach	Kaiserslautern
20:45		Report	Stindl 11'	Stadium: Fritz-Walter-Stadion; Attendance: 5,000; Referee: Harm Osmers

25 August 2021 (Note: The Bremer SV v Bayern Munich match, originally scheduled on 6 August 2021, 20:45, was postponed because Bremer SV was put in quarantine, after several positive SARS‑CoV‑2 tests by their players.)	Bremer SV	0–12	Bayern Munich	Bremen (Note: The Bremer SV v Bayern Munich match took place at the Wohninvest Weserstadion instead of Bremer SV's home stadium, the Stadion am Panzenberg.)
20:15		Report	Choupo-Moting 8', 28', 35', 82'; Musiala 16', 48'; Warm 27' (o.g.); Tillman 47'; Sané 65'; Cuisance 80'; Sarr 86'; Tolisso 88'	Stadium: Wohninvest Weserstadion; Attendance: 10,093; Referee: Nicolas Winter

=== Second round ===
The draw for the second round was held on 29 August 2021 at 18:30, with Ronald Rauhe drawing the matches. The sixteen matches took place from 26 to 27 October 2021.

26 October 2021	Preußen Münster	1–3	Hertha BSC	Münster
18:30	Deters 41'	Report	Jovetić 3'; Belfodil 79'; Richter 83'	Stadium: Preußenstadion; Attendance: 11,037; Referee: Frank Willenborg

26 October 2021	SV Babelsberg	0–1	RB Leipzig	Potsdam
18:30		Report	Szoboszlai 45'	Stadium: Karl-Liebknecht-Stadion; Attendance: 6,218; Referee: Benjamin Cortus

26 October 2021	1860 Munich	1–0	Schalke 04	Munich
18:30	Lex 5'	Report		Stadium: Grünwalder Stadion; Attendance: 15,000; Referee: Robert Kampka

26 October 2021	1899 Hoffenheim	5–1	Holstein Kiel	Sinsheim
18:30	Van den Bergh 3' (o.g.); Wahl 31' (o.g.); Stiller 59'; Dabbur 72'; Bruun Larsen 84'	Report	Neumann 47'	Stadium: PreZero Arena; Attendance: 5,033; Referee: Robert Hartmann

26 October 2021	Borussia Dortmund	2–0	FC Ingolstadt	Dortmund
20:00	Hazard 72', 81'	Report		Stadium: Signal Iduna Park; Attendance: 28,000; Referee: Matthias Jöllenbeck

26 October 2021	VfL Osnabrück	2–2 (a.e.t.) (2–3 p)	SC Freiburg	Osnabrück
20:45	Gugganig 90+7'; Klaas 109'	Report	Grifo 33'; K. Schlotterbeck 120'	Stadium: Stadion an der Bremer Brücke; Attendance: 12,000; Referee: Robert Schröder
	Penalties
	Kleinhansl (penalty missed); Klaas (penalty scored); Gugganig (penalty scored); Itter (penalty missed); Wooten (penalty missed)		(penalty missed) Höler; (penalty scored) Günter; (penalty scored) Eggestein; (penalty scored) K. Schlotterbeck; (penalty missed) Jeong

26 October 2021	1. FC Nürnberg	1–1 (a.e.t.) (2–4 p)	Hamburger SV	Nuremberg
20:45	Duman 59'	Report	David 45'	Stadium: Max-Morlock-Stadion; Attendance: 20,000; Referee: Bastian Dankert
	Penalties
	Geis (penalty scored); Duman (penalty scored); Tempelmann (penalty missed); Sørensen (penalty missed)		(penalty scored) Kinsombi; (penalty scored) Kittel; (penalty scored) Schonlau; (penalty scored) David

26 October 2021	Mainz 05	3–2 (a.e.t.)	Arminia Bielefeld	Mainz
20:45	Burkardt 53'; Onisiwo 59'; Ingvartsen 114'	Report	Okugawa 2'; Klos 89'	Stadium: Mewa Arena; Attendance: 10,000; Referee: Sascha Stegemann

27 October 2021	Waldhof Mannheim	1–3 (a.e.t.)	Union Berlin	Mannheim
18:30	Rossipal 4'	Report	Behrens 18', 118'; Awoniyi 94'	Stadium: Carl-Benz-Stadion; Attendance: 15,000; Referee: Benjamin Brand

27 October 2021	VfL Bochum	2–2 (a.e.t.) (5–4 p)	FC Augsburg	Bochum
18:30	Pantović 12', 53'	Report	Oxford 55'; Vargas 58'	Stadium: Vonovia Ruhrstadion; Attendance: 15,220; Referee: Martin Petersen
	Penalties
	Rexhbeçaj (penalty scored); Mašović (penalty scored); Blum (penalty scored); Polter (penalty scored); Riemann (penalty scored)		(penalty scored) Gouweleeuw; (penalty scored) Finnbogason; (penalty scored) Strobl; (penalty scored) Gregoritsch; (penalty missed) Maier

27 October 2021	Dynamo Dresden	2–3 (a.e.t.)	FC St. Pauli	Dresden
18:30	Daferner 66'; Ziereis 73' (o.g.)	Report	Paqarada 63'; Dittgen 72'; Buchtmann 101'	Stadium: Rudolf-Harbig-Stadion; Attendance: 16,000; Referee: Sven Waschitzki

27 October 2021	Bayer Leverkusen	1–2	Karlsruher SC	Leverkusen
18:30	Frimpong 54'	Report	Cueto 5'; Choi 63'	Stadium: BayArena; Attendance: 13,060; Referee: Tobias Welz

27 October 2021	Hannover 96	3–0	Fortuna Düsseldorf	Hanover
20:45	Kerk 30'; Beier 90+2', 90+5'	Report		Stadium: HDI-Arena; Attendance: 8,000; Referee: Florian Badstübner

27 October 2021	Borussia Mönchengladbach	5–0	Bayern Munich	Mönchengladbach
20:45	Koné 2'; Bensebaini 15', 21' (pen.); Embolo 51', 57'	Report		Stadium: Borussia-Park; Attendance: 48,500; Referee: Tobias Stieler

27 October 2021	Jahn Regensburg	3–3 (a.e.t.) (2–4 p)	Hansa Rostock	Regensburg
20:45	Singh 71'; Zwarts 90+1'; Breitkreuz 101'	Report	Riedel 9'; Mamba 56'; Breier 120+1'	Stadium: Jahnstadion Regensburg; Attendance: 7,000; Referee: Tobias Reichel
	Penalties
	Wekesser (penalty scored); Boukhalfa (penalty scored); Albers (penalty missed); Guwara (penalty missed)		(penalty scored) Bahn; (penalty scored) Malone; (penalty scored) Behrens; (penalty scored) Breier

27 October 2021	VfB Stuttgart	0–2	1. FC Köln	Stuttgart
20:45		Report	Modeste 72', 77'	Stadium: Mercedes-Benz Arena; Attendance: 25,000; Referee: Deniz Aytekin

=== Round of 16 ===
The draw for the round of 16 was held on 31 October 2021 at 18:30. The matches were drawn by Peter Zimmermann, the chairman of SG Ahrtal, one of the football clubs affected by the 2021 floods in Germany. The eight matches took place from 18 to 19 January 2022.

18 January 2022	1860 Munich	0–1	Karlsruher SC	Munich
18:30		Report	Wanitzek 69' (pen.)	Stadium: Grünwalder Stadion; Attendance: 0 (Note: The match was played behind closed doors due to the COVID-19 pandemic in Germany.); Referee: Martin Petersen

18 January 2022	1. FC Köln	1–1 (a.e.t.) (3–4 p)	Hamburger SV	Cologne
18:30	Modeste 120+2' (pen.)	Report	Glatzel 92'	Stadium: RheinEnergieStadion; Attendance: 750; Referee: Daniel Schlager
	Penalties
	Özcan (penalty missed); Modeste (penalty scored); Ljubičić (penalty scored); Duda (penalty scored); Kainz (penalty missed)		(penalty scored) Kinsombi; (penalty missed) Kittel; (penalty scored) Vušković; (penalty scored) Gyamerah; (penalty scored) Schonlau

18 January 2022	FC St. Pauli	2–1	Borussia Dortmund	Hamburg
20:45	Amenyido 4'; Witsel 40' (o.g.)	Report	Haaland 58' (pen.)	Stadium: Millerntor-Stadion; Attendance: 2,000; Referee: Harm Osmers

18 January 2022	VfL Bochum	3–1	Mainz 05	Bochum
20:45	Pantović 56' (pen.), 59'; Löwen 80'	Report	Onisiwo 36'	Stadium: Vonovia Ruhrstadion; Attendance: 750; Referee: Felix Brych

19 January 2022	Hannover 96	3–0	Borussia Mönchengladbach	Hanover
18:30	Beier 4', 51'; Kerk 36' (pen.)	Report		Stadium: HDI-Arena; Attendance: 500; Referee: Florian Badstübner

19 January 2022	RB Leipzig	2–0	Hansa Rostock	Leipzig
18:30	Poulsen 6'; Olmo 82'	Report		Stadium: Red Bull Arena; Attendance: 1,000; Referee: Sven Jablonski

19 January 2022	1899 Hoffenheim	1–4	SC Freiburg	Sinsheim
20:45	N. Schlotterbeck 53' (o.g.)	Report	Grifo 10', 36' (pen.); Schade 55'; Demirović 68'	Stadium: PreZero Arena; Attendance: 500; Referee: Robert Schröder

19 January 2022	Hertha BSC	2–3	Union Berlin	Berlin
20:45	Khedira 54' (o.g.); Serdar 90+5'	Report	Voglsammer 11'; Stark 50' (o.g.); Knoche 55'	Stadium: Olympiastadion; Attendance: 3,000; Referee: Deniz Aytekin

=== Quarter-finals ===
The draw for the quarter-finals was held on 30 January 2022 at 19:15. Felix Neureuther was scheduled to draw the matches, but had to cancel; the draw was then performed by Norbert Dickel. The four matches will take place from 1 to 2 March 2022.

1 March 2022	Union Berlin	2–1	FC St. Pauli	Berlin
20:45	Becker 45'; Voglsammer 75'	Report	Kyereh 21'	Stadium: Stadion An der Alten Försterei; Attendance: 10,000; Referee: Florian Badstübner

2 March 2022	Hamburger SV	2–2 (a.e.t.) (3–2 p)	Karlsruher SC	Hamburg
18:30	Glatzel 52', 90+1'	Report	Heise 40'; Hofmann 50'	Stadium: Volksparkstadion; Attendance: 25,000; Referee: Felix Zwayer
	Penalties
	Schonlau (penalty missed); Vagnoman (penalty scored); Vušković (penalty scored); Glatzel (penalty scored)		(penalty scored) Gondorf; (penalty scored) Heise; (penalty missed) Wanitzek; (penalty missed) Van Rhijn; (penalty missed) O'Shaughnessy

2 March 2022	Hannover 96	0–4	RB Leipzig	Hanover
18:30		Report	Nkunku 17', 22'; Laimer 67'; Silva 73'	Stadium: HDI-Arena; Attendance: 25,000; Referee: Marco Fritz

2 March 2022	VfL Bochum	1–2 (a.e.t.)	SC Freiburg	Bochum
20:45	Polter 64'	Report	Petersen 51'; Sallai 120'	Stadium: Vonovia Ruhrstadion; Attendance: 10,000; Referee: Robert Schröder

=== Semi-finals ===
The draw for the semi-finals was held on 6 March 2022, with Laura Nolte drawing the matches. The two matches will take place from 19 to 20 April 2022.

19 April 2022	Hamburger SV	1–3	SC Freiburg	Hamburg
20:45	Glatzel 88'	Report	Petersen 11'; Höfler 17'; Grifo 35' (pen.)	Stadium: Volksparkstadion; Attendance: 57,000; Referee: Deniz Aytekin

20 April 2022	RB Leipzig	2–1	Union Berlin	Leipzig
20:45	Silva 61' (pen.); Forsberg 90+3'	Report	Becker 25'	Stadium: Red Bull Arena; Attendance: 47,069; Referee: Felix Brych

=== Final ===
The final took place on 21 May 2022 at the Olympiastadion in Berlin.

21 May 2022
20:00 CEST

SC Freiburg	1–1 (a.e.t.)	RB Leipzig
Eggestein 19'	Report	Nkunku 76'
Penalties
Petersen (penalty scored); Günter (penalty missed); K. Schlotterbeck (penalty scored); Demirović (penalty missed)	2–4	(penalty scored) Nkunku; (penalty scored) Orbán; (penalty scored) Olmo; (penalty scored) Henrichs

Olympiastadion, Berlin
Attendance: 74,322
Referee: Sascha Stegemann (Niederkassel)

== Top goalscorers ==
The following were the top scorers of the DFB-Pokal, sorted first by number of goals, and then alphabetically if necessary. Goals scored in penalty shoot-outs are not included.

Rank	Player	Team	Goals
1	(Germany) Robert Glatzel	Hamburger SV	5
2	(Germany) Maximilian Beier	Hannover 96	4
2	(Cameroon) Eric Maxim Choupo-Moting	Bayern Munich	4
2	(Norway) Erling Haaland	Borussia Dortmund	4
2	(Serbia) Miloš Pantović	VfL Bochum	4
2	(Italy) Vincenzo Grifo	SC Freiburg	4
7	(Germany) Jonathan Burkardt	Mainz 05	3
7	(France) Anthony Modeste	1. FC Köln	3
7	(France) Christopher Nkunku	RB Leipzig	3
10	24 players		2
