= Scott Kennedy (soccer) =

Canadian soccer player

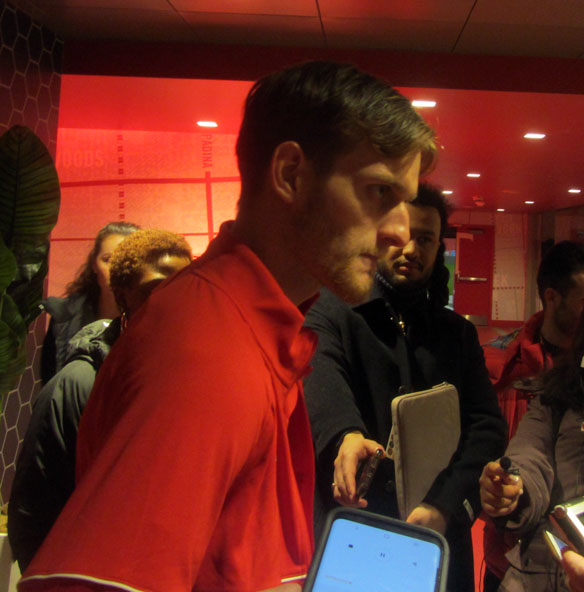
- Kennedy in 2023

Personal information
- Full name: Scott Fitzgerald Kennedy
- Date of birth: March 31, 1997 (age 29)
- Place of birth: Calgary, Alberta, Canada
- Height: 1.90 m (6 ft 3 in)
- Position: Centre-back

Team information
- Current team: SGV Heilbronn-Freiberg
- Number: 28

Youth career
- Calgary West
- Calgary Chinooks

Senior career*
Years	Team	Apps	(Gls)
2015–2016	SBC Traunstein	31	(2)
2016–2017	FC Amberg	11	(1)
2017–2018	SV Grödig	24	(4)
2018–2020	Austria Klagenfurt	38	(3)
2020–2023	Jahn Regensburg	68	(2)
2023–2024	Wolfsberger AC	18	(1)
2024–2026	Eupen	46	(2)
2026–	SGV Heilbronn-Freiberg	6	(1)

International career^{‡}
2021–	Canada	14	(0)
Medal record
Representing Canada
Men's soccer
CONCACAF Nations League
Runner-up	2023
- * Club domestic league appearances and goals as of 21:26, September 10, 2026 (UTC) ‡ National team caps and goals as of July 9, 2023

Scott Fitzgerald Kennedy (born March 31, 1997) is a Canadian professional soccer player who plays as a centre-back for Regionalliga Südwest side SGV Heilbronn-Freiberg and the Canada national team.

== Club career ==
=== Early career ===
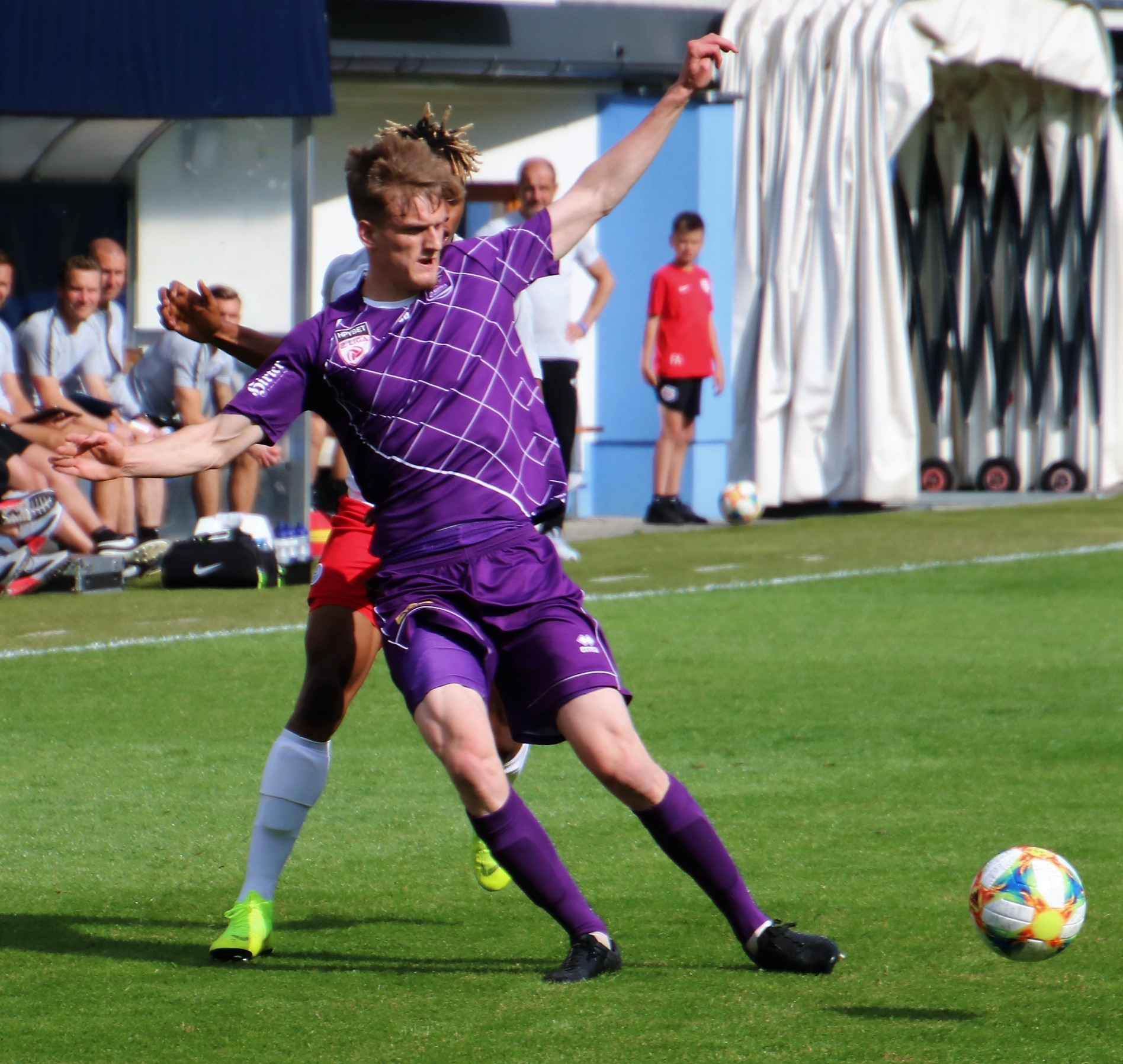
Kennedy with Austria Klagenfurt in 2019

Kennedy moved to Germany as an 18-year-old, signing with SBC Traunstein in 2015, and later with FC Amberg in 2016. Kennedy would move to Austria in June 2017, joining Austrian Regionalliga West club SV Grödig. In July 2018, he signed with Austria Klagenfurt.

=== Jahn Regensburg ===
In August 2020, Kennedy joined then 2. Bundesliga side Jahn Regensburg on a three-year contract. He made his debut on October 31 against SC Paderborn. Kennedy's performances in his first season impressed, particularly in the 2020–21 DFB-Pokal, during which Regensburg knocked out Bundesliga side 1. FC Köln to advance to the quarter-finals.

Kennedy's third season was marked by club struggles and injury, including a shoulder injury that forced him out of Canada's team for the 2022 FIFA World Cup. At the end of the season Jahn Regensburg was relegated to the 3. Liga, and Kennedy departed the club upon the expiration of his contract.

=== Wolfsberger AC ===
In July 2023, Austrian Bundesliga side Wolfsberger AC announced they had signed Kennedy to a two-year contract with an option for a third. He made his debut for his new club on July 29, playing the entire match in a 2-1 victory over Blau-Weiß Linz. Kennedy scored his first goal on November 26, netting the only goal in a 1-0 victory over Austria Wien.

=== Eupen ===
In September 2024, Challenger Pro League side Eupen announced they had signed Kennedy on a two-year deal until June 2026. He made his first appearance for Eupen on September 15 against Zulte Waregem.

=== Heilbronn-Freiberg ===
In summer 2026, he joined Regionalliga Südwest side SGV Heilbronn-Freiberg.

== International career ==
While with Regensburg, Kennedy began to get interest in representing Canada internationally. On May 26, 2021, Jahn Regensburg confirmed Kennedy had been called up to Canada for their upcoming 2022 FIFA World Cup qualification matches. He made his debut for Canada on June 8 in the match against Suriname, playing the full 90 minutes in a 4–0 victory. On July 1, he was named to the final squad of the 2021 CONCACAF Gold Cup, but was replaced 9 days later by Frank Sturing for medical reasons.

In late October 2022, Kennedy suffered a shoulder injury in a league match that his coach Mersad Selimbegovic confirmed would sideline him for "a few months," ruling him out of consideration for the 2022 FIFA World Cup squad.

In June 2023, Kennedy was called-up to the final 23-man squad contesting the 2023 CONCACAF Nations League Finals. On June 19, he was called-up to the final squad for the 2023 CONCACAF Gold Cup. On July 9, during Canada's Quarter-final match against the United States, Kennedy would score an own-goal leading to a 2-2 draw. Canada would then lose 2–3 during the subsequent penalty shootout, eliminating them from the tournament.

== Personal life ==
Kennedy is of German descent through his mother, and holds dual Canadian-German citizenship.

== Career statistics ==
=== Club ===
As of match played September 8, 2026

Appearances and goals by club, season and competition
Club	Season	League			National cup (Note: Includes DFB-Pokal, Austrian Cup)		Total	
Club	Season	Division	Apps	Goals	Apps	Goals	Apps	Goals
SBC Traunstein	2015–16	Landesliga Bayern-Südost	31	2	0	0	31	2
FC Amberg	2016–17	Bayernliga	11	1	2	0	13	1
SV Grödig	2017–18	Austrian Regionalliga West	24	4	2	0	26	4
Austria Klagenfurt	2018–19	Austrian 2. Liga	29	3	2	0	31	3
Austria Klagenfurt	2019–20	Austrian 2. Liga	9	0	0	0	9	0
Austria Klagenfurt	Total		38	3	2	0	40	3
Jahn Regensburg	2020–21	2. Bundesliga	22	0	3	1	25	1
Jahn Regensburg	2021–22	2. Bundesliga	23	2	1	0	24	2
Jahn Regensburg	2022–23	2. Bundesliga	23	0	1	0	24	0
Jahn Regensburg	Total		68	2	5	1	73	3
Wolfsberger AC	2023–24	Austrian Bundesliga	18	1	2	0	20	1
Wolfsberger AC	2024–25	Austrian Bundesliga	0	0	1	0	1	0
Wolfsberger AC	Total		18	1	3	0	21	0
Eupen	2024–25	Challenger Pro League	19	1	1	0	20	1
Eupen	2025–26	Challenger Pro League	27	1	1	0	28	1
Eupen	Total		46	2	2	0	48	2
SGV Heilbronn-Freiberg	2026–27	Regionalliga Südwest	6	1	–		6	1
Career total			242	16	17	1	258	17

=== International ===
As of match played July 9, 2023

Appearances and goals by national team and year
National team	Year	Apps	Goals
Canada
Canada	2021	5	0
Canada	2022	3	0
Canada	2023	6	0
Total		14	0
