= Dejan Stojanović (disambiguation) =

Dejan Stojanović (born 1959) is a Serbian writer.

Dejan Stojanović may also refer to:

- Dejan Stojanović (footballer) (born 1993), Austrian footballer
- Dejan Stojanović (musician), drummer for the rock band Smak
