= 2024–25 KAS Eupen season =

K.A.S. Eupen
2024–25 season
- Manager: Mersad Selimbegović
- Stadium: Kehrwegstadion
- Challenger Pro League: 10th
- Belgian Cup: Round of 32
- Top goalscorer: League: Isaac Nuhu (10); All: Isaac Nuhu (11)
- Biggest win: RFC Liège 0–3 Eupen

The 2024–25 season was the 80th season in the history of the K.A.S. Eupen, and the club's first season back in the Challenger Pro League since 2016. In addition to the domestic league, the team participated in the Belgian Cup.

== Competitions ==
=== Overall record ===
Competition	First match	Last match	Starting round	Final position	Record							
Competition	First match	Last match	Starting round	Final position	Pld	W	D	L	GF	GA	GD	Win %
Challenger Pro League	18 August 2024	18 April 2025	Matchday 1		28	8	6	14	38	47	−9	28.57
Belgian Cup	6 September 2024	30 October 2024	Sixth round	Round of 32	2	1	0	1	3	5	−2	50.00
Total					30	9	6	15	41	52	−11	30.00

Last updated: 18 April 2025
Source: Competitions

=== Challenger Pro League ===
==== League table ====
Pos	Team	Pld	W	D	L	GF	GA	GD	Pts
8	Lierse	28	11	7	10	40	35	+5	40
9	RFC Liège	28	9	7	12	38	44	−6	34
10	Eupen	28	8	6	14	38	47	−9	30
11	Lommel	28	8	5	15	32	46	−14	29
12	Francs Borains	28	8	4	16	29	50	−21	28

Source: Challenger Pro League
Rules for classification: 1) Points; 2) Matches won; 3) Goal difference; 4) Goals scored; 5) Away matches won; 6) Away goal difference; 7) Away goals made.

==== Results summary ====
Overall								Home						Away					
Pld	W	D	L	GF	GA	GD	Pts	W	D	L	GF	GA	GD	W	D	L	GF	GA	GD
3	1	1	1	6	4	+2	4	0	1	0	2	2	0	1	0	1	4	2	+2

Source: Worldfootball

==== Results by round ====
Round	1	2	3	4
Ground	A	H	A	H
Result	W	D	L	
Position	3			

Source: Worldfootball
A = Away; H = Home; W = Win; D = Draw; L = Loss

==== Matches ====
The match schedule was released on 11 June 2024.

18 August 2024 1	RFC Liège	0–3	Eupen	Liège
16:00				Stadium: Stade de Rocourt

23 August 2024 2	Eupen	2–2	Beveren	Eupen
20:00				Stadium: Kehrwegstadion

30 August 2024 3	RWDM	2–1	Eupen	Molenbeek-Saint-Jean
20:00				Stadium: Edmond Machtens Stadium

15 September 2024 4	Eupen	1–3	Zulte Waregem	Eupen
13:30				Stadium: Kehrwegstadion

21 September 2024 5	Lierse	3–0	Eupen

27 September 2024 6	Eupen	3–1	Jong Genk

5 October 2024 7	RFC Seraing	1–2	Eupen

19 October 2024 8	Lommel	1–1	Eupen

27 October 2024 9	Eupen	0–1	Lokeren-Temse

2 November 2024 10	RSCA Futures	2–2	Eupen

10 November 2024 11	Eupen	0–4	Patro Eisden Maasmechelen

22 November 2024 12	Club NXT	0–4	Eupen

1 December 2024 13	Eupen	3–4	La Louvière

8 December 2024 14	Royal Francs Borains	3–2	Eupen

14 December 2024 15	Eupen	v	Deinze

21 December 2024 16	Eupen	0–1	RFC Liège

18 January 2025 18	Eupen	0–1	RWD Molenbeek

25 January 2025 19	Zulte Waregem	3–2	Eupen

28 January 2025 17	Lokeren-Temse	0–0	Eupen

1 February 2025 20	Eupen	3–2	Lommel

9 February 2025 21	Eupen	1–3	Lierse

16 February 2025 22	Jong Genk	0–0	Eupen

22 February 2025 23	Eupen	2–2	RSCA Futures

28 February 2025 24	La Louvière	2–0	Eupen

8 March 2025 25	Eupen	3–1	Royal Francs Borains

26	Bye

30 March 2025 27	Eupen	1–0	Club NXT

4 April 2025 28	Beveren	3–0	Eupen

12 April 2025 29	Eupen	2–1	RFC Seraing

18 April 2025 30	Patro Eisden Maasmechelen	1–0	Eupen

=== Belgian Cup ===
6 September 2024 Sixth round	KV Diksmuide-Oostende	2–3	Eupen	Ostend
20:00	20'; 90'		Nuhu 31'; Emond 59'; Pantović 66'	Stadium: Diaz Arena

30 October 2024 Round of 32	Eupen	0–3	Union Saint-Gilloise
20:00
