= Aygün Yıldırım =

German footballer

Personal information
- Date of birth: 4 April 1995 (age 31)
- Place of birth: Ahlen, Germany
- Height: 1.80 m (5 ft 11 in)
- Position: Forward

Team information
- Current team: SV Rödinghausen
- Number: 18

Youth career
- –2006: DJK Vorwärts Ahlen
- 2006–2014: Rot Weiss Ahlen

Senior career*
Years	Team	Apps	(Gls)
2014–2016	Rot Weiss Ahlen	70	(18)
2016–2017	Rot Weiss Ahlen	26	(1)
2017–2018	SC Wiedenbrück	32	(13)
2018–2019	Sportfreunde Lotte	7	(0)
2019	→ SC Verl (loan)	13	(9)
2019–2021	SC Verl	66	(34)
2021–2023	Jahn Regensburg	39	(1)
2023–2024	Arminia Bielefeld	27	(2)
2025	1461 Trabzon	14	(0)
2025–	SV Rödinghausen	15	(0)
- * Club domestic league appearances and goals as of 24 June 2026

Aygün Yıldırım (born 4 April 1995) is a German professional footballer who plays as a forward for SV Rödinghausen.

== Career ==
In May 2021 2. Bundesliga club SSV Jahn Regensburg announced the signing of Yıldırım for the 2021–22 season. He joined from 3. Liga side SC Verl and signed a contract until 2023.

He joined Arminia Bielefeld in June 2023. He was released from Arminia Bielefeld on 4 November 2024.
