= Maximilian Thalhammer =

German footballer

Personal information
- Date of birth: 10 July 1997 (age 29)
- Place of birth: Freising, Germany
- Height: 1.92 m (6 ft 4 in)
- Position: Midfielder

Team information
- Current team: Waldhof Mannheim
- Number: 8

Youth career
- –2014: SE Freising
- 2014–2016: FC Ingolstadt 04

Senior career*
| Years | Team | Apps | (Gls) |
| 2016– | FC Ingolstadt 04 II | 35 | (3) |
| 2017–2020 | FC Ingolstadt 04 | 35 | (3) |
| 2018–2019 | → Jahn Regensburg (loan) | 22 | (1) |
| 2020–2022 | SC Paderborn | 21 | (0) |
| 2022–2023 | Jahn Regensburg | 30 | (1) |
| 2023–2024 | VfL Osnabrück | 16 | (0) |
| 2024– | Waldhof Mannheim | 55 | (1) |

International career^{‡}
| 2016 | Germany U20 | 5 | (0) |
- * Club domestic league appearances and goals as of 29 May 2026 ‡ National team caps and goals as of 14:17, 3 February 2018 (UTC)

Maximilian Thalhammer (born 10 July 1997) is a German professional footballer who plays as a midfielder for 3. Liga club Waldhof Mannheim. He previously played for SC Paderborn 07,SSV Jahn Regensburg and FC Ingolstadt 04.

== Club career ==
On 13 June 2024, Thalhammer signed with Waldhof Mannheim in 3. Liga.
