= Dejan Stojanović (footballer) =

Serbian association football player

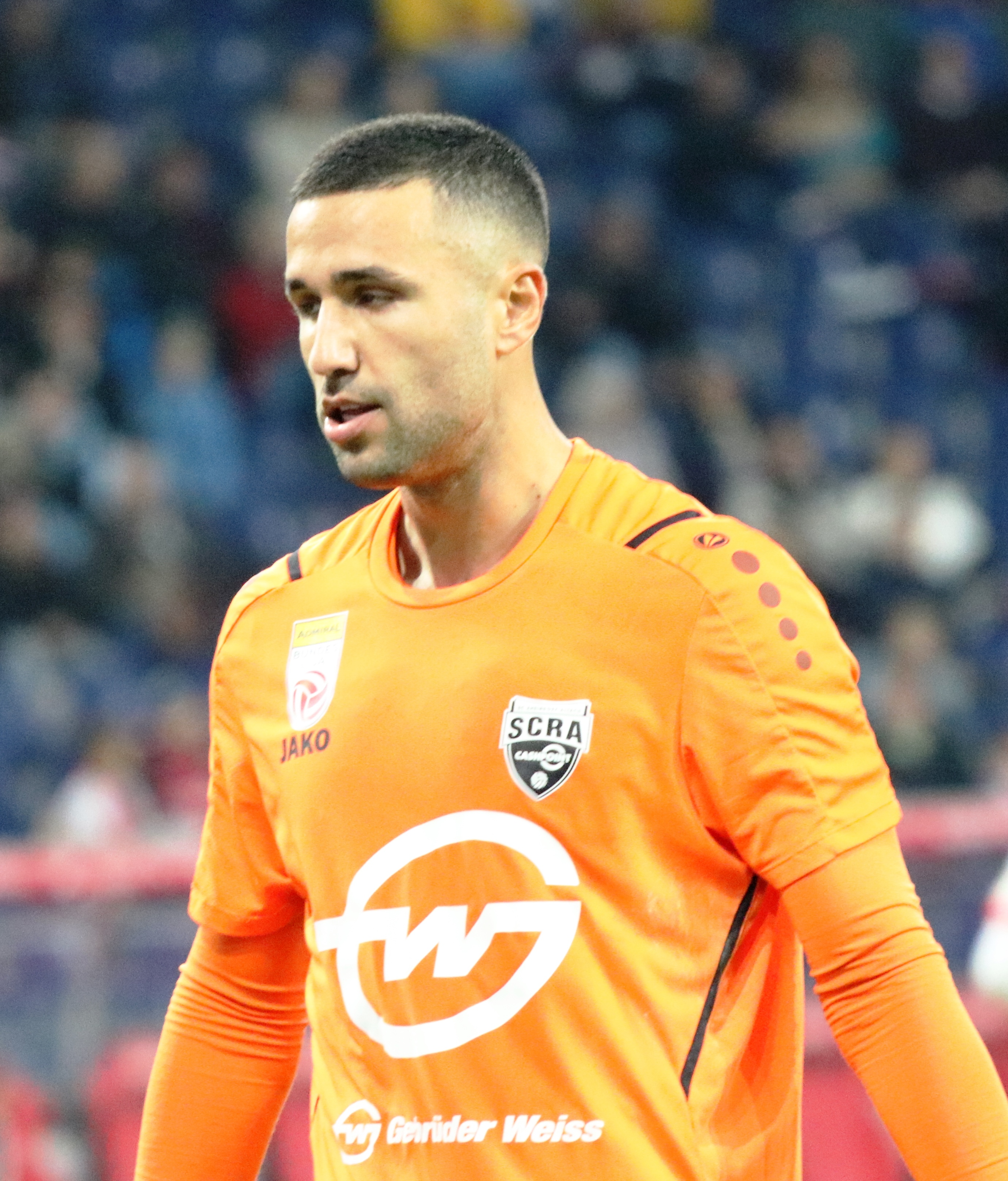
- Stojanović with Rheindorf Altach in 2024

Personal information
- Date of birth: 19 July 1993 (age 33)
- Place of birth: Feldkirch, Austria
- Height: 1.95 m (6 ft 5 in)
- Position: Goalkeeper

Team information
- Current team: Rheindorf Altach
- Number: 1

Senior career*
Years	Team	Apps	(Gls)
2010–2011	FC Lustenau 07	24	(0)
2011–2016	Bologna	10	(0)
2015	→ Crotone (loan)	2	(0)
2016–2020	St. Gallen	69	(0)
2020–2022	Middlesbrough	8	(0)
2021	→ FC St. Pauli (loan)	19	(0)
2022	→ FC Ingolstadt 04 (loan)	3	(0)
2022–2023	SSV Jahn Regensburg	14	(0)
2023–	Rheindorf Altach	87	(0)

International career
2010–2011	Macedonia U21	1	(0)
- * Club domestic league appearances and goals as of 10 June 2026

Dejan Stojanović (Serbian: Дејан Cтojaнoвић; born 19 July 1993) is a professional footballer who plays as a goalkeeper for Rheindorf Altach. Born in Austria, he is a former youth international for North Macedonia.

== Club career ==
Stojanović made 23 league appearances for FC Lustenau 07 in the 2010–11 season after initially starting the season as the backup keeper. He took over as the Lustenau starting keeper in the 13th round of the Austrian First League and started the next 23 games before he was rested in the final league game of the season.

On 21 January 2015, he signed for Serie B club F.C. Crotone on loan from Bologna until the end of the season.

On 31 August 2016, Stojanović signed for Swiss club FC St. Gallen on a one-year deal.

He moved to an English club for the first time on 16 January 2020, joining Middlesbrough on a three-and-a-half-year contract.

On 5 January 2021, Stojanovic joined 2. Bundesliga side FC St. Pauli on loan until 30 June 2021.

On 31 December 2021, Stojanovic joined 2. Bundesliga side FC Ingolstadt 04 on loan for the remainder of the season.

On 1 July 2022, Stojanovic joined 2. Bundesliga side SSV Jahn Regensburg.

== International career ==
Stojanović was called up to the Macedonia national under-21 team and played in a friendly match against Montenegro U-21 in 2011. In the same year, he accepted the call from Austria U-19 and was named on subs bench for the three 2012 UEFA European Under-19 Football Championship qualification matches.

== Career statistics ==
As of 29 October 2022

Appearances and goals by club, season and competition
Club	Season	League			National cup		League cup		Europe		Total	
Club	Season	Division	Apps	Goals	Apps	Goals	Apps	Goals	Apps	Goals	Apps	Goals
FC Lustenau 07	2009–10	Austrian First League	1	0	0	0	—		—		1	0
FC Lustenau 07	2010–11	Austrian First League	23	0	2	0	—		—		25	0
FC Lustenau 07	Total		24	0	2	0	—		—		26	0
Bologna	2011–12	Serie A	0	0	0	0	—		—		0	0
Bologna	2012–13	Serie A	4	0	1	0	—		—		5	0
Bologna	2013–14	Serie A	1	0	1	0	—		—		2	0
Bologna	2014–15	Serie B	5	0	1	0	—		—		6	0
Bologna	2015–16	Serie A	0	0	0	0	—		—		0	0
Bologna	Total		10	0	3	0	—		—		13	0
Crotone (loan)	2014–15	Serie B	2	0	0	0	—		—		2	0
St. Gallen	2016–17	Swiss Super League	4	0	2	0	—		—		6	0
St. Gallen	2017–18	Swiss Super League	13	0	3	0	—		—		16	0
St. Gallen	2018–19	Swiss Super League	34	0	2	0	—		—		36	0
St. Gallen	2019–20	Swiss Super League	18	0	1	0	—		2	0	21	0
St. Gallen	Total		69	0	10	0	—		2	0	81	0
Middlesbrough	2019–20	EFL Championship	8	0	0	0	0	0	—		8	0
Middlesbrough	2020–21	EFL Championship	0	0	0	0	1	0	—		1	0
Middlesbrough	Total		8	0	0	0	1	0	—		9	0
FC St. Pauli (loan)	2020–21	2. Bundesliga	19	0	0	0	—		—		19	0
FC Ingolstadt 04 (loan)	2021–22	2. Bundesliga	9	0	0	0	—		—		9	0
Jahn Regensburg	2022–23	2. Bundesliga	14	0	2	0	—		—		16	0
Career total			155	0	17	0	1	0	2	0	175	0
