= Björn Zempelin =

German footballer

Personal information
- Full name: Björn Karl Zempelin
- Date of birth: 7 February 2000 (age 26)
- Place of birth: Germany
- Height: 1.71 m (5 ft 7 in)
- Position: Midfielder

Team information
- Current team: ASV Cham
- Number: 8

Youth career
- SC Sinzing
- –2019: Jahn Regensburg

Senior career*
Years	Team	Apps	(Gls)
2019–2022	Jahn Regensburg II	25	(1)
2020–2022	Jahn Regensburg	3	(0)
2023–	ASV Cham	50	(10)
- * Club domestic league appearances and goals as of 20 July 2024

Björn Karl Zempelin (born 7 February 2000) is a German professional footballer who plays as a midfielder for ASV Cham in Bayernliga.

== Career ==
Zempelin made his professional debut for Jahn Regensburg in the 2. Bundesliga on 9 May 2021, coming on as a substitute in the 84th minute for Kaan Caliskaner against VfL Bochum. The away match finished as a 5–1 loss.

In summer 2022, he decided to give his psychology studies priority and his contract was dissolved by mutual consent.

He returned to playing in January 2023 in the fifth-tier Bayernliga with ASV Cham.
