= Leon Guwara =

Footballer (born 1996)

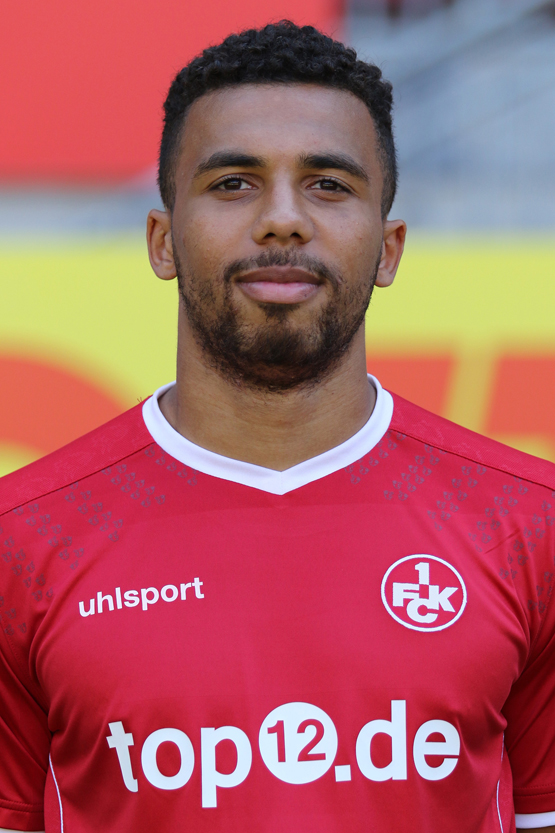
- Guwara with 1. FC Kaiserslautern in 2017

Personal information
- Date of birth: 28 June 1996 (age 30)
- Place of birth: Cologne, Germany
- Height: 1.85 m (6 ft 1 in)
- Position: Left-back

Youth career
- –2003: Schwarz-Weiß Köln
- 2003–2014: 1. FC Köln
- 2014–2015: Werder Bremen

Senior career*
Years	Team	Apps	(Gls)
2014–2018	Werder Bremen II	43	(3)
2016–2018	Werder Bremen	1	(0)
2016–2017	→ Darmstadt 98 (loan)	17	(0)
2017–2018	→ 1. FC Kaiserslautern (loan)	25	(0)
2018–2021	Utrecht	28	(0)
2021	→ VVV-Venlo (loan)	16	(0)
2021–2023	Jahn Regensburg	38	(1)
2023–2025	FC Ingolstadt	26	(0)
2025–2026	Energie Cottbus	15	(0)

International career^{‡}
2012	Germany U16	1	(0)
2012–2013	Germany U17	6	(0)
2014	Germany U19	3	(0)
2015–2016	Germany U20	6	(0)
2021–	Gambia	2	(0)
- * Club domestic league appearances and goals as of 28 May 2026 ‡ National team caps and goals as of 19:26, 20 June 2021 (UTC)

Leon Guwara (born 28 June 1996) is a professional footballer who plays as a left-back. Born in Germany, he plays for the Gambia national team.

== Club career ==
Guwara joined 1. FC Köln as a child from Schwarz-Weiß Köln in 2003. He made 19 appearances for the U-19 team in the 2013–14 season of the Under 19 Bundesliga.

In April 2014, it was announced that Guwara would be joining Werder Bremen for the 2014–15 season. He made his Bundesliga debut for Werder Bremen on 5 February 2016 against Borussia Mönchengladbach.

On 31 August 2016, Guwara joined Darmstadt 98 on a season-long loan.

In June 2017, he joined 1. FC Kaiserslautern on loan for the 2017–18.

In May 2018, Eredivisie side FC Utrecht announced the signing of Guwara for the 2018–19. Guwara agreed a three-year contract with the club with the option of a fourth. During the winter break of the 2020–21 season, he was loaned out to league rivals VVV-Venlo for the rest of the season.

In June 2021, 2. Bundesliga side Jahn Regensburg announced the transfer free signing of Guwara for the 2021–22 season. Guwara agreed a two-year contract.

On 15 July 2025, Guwara joined 3. Liga club Energie Cottbus.

== International career ==
Guwara was born in Germany to a Gambian father and a German mother. He has represented Germany at various youth international levels. He debuted for the Gambia in a 2–0 friendly win over Niger on 5 June 2021.

== Career statistics ==
=== Club ===
As of match played on 21 October 2023

Appearances and goals by club, season and competition
Club	Season	League			Cup		Continental		Other		Total	
Club	Season	Division	Apps	Goals	Apps	Goals	Apps	Goals	Apps	Goals	Apps	Goals
Werder Bremen II	2014–15	Regionalliga Nord	25	1	–		–		2	0	27	1
Werder Bremen II	2015–16	3. Liga	18	2	–		–		–		18	2
Werder Bremen II	Total		43	3	0	0	0	0	2	0	45	3
Werder Bremen	2014–15	Bundesliga	1	0	1	0	–		–		2	0
Darmstadt 98 (loan)	2016–17	Bundesliga	17	0	0	0	–		–		17	0
1. FC Kaiserslautern (loan)	2017–18	2. Bundesliga	25	0	2	0	–		–		27	0
Utrecht	2018–19	Eredivisie	12	0	2	0	–		–		14	0
Utrecht	2019–20	Eredivisie	15	0	3	1	2	0	–		20	1
Utrecht	2020–21	Eredivisie	1	0	0	0	0	0	–		1	0
Utrecht	Total		28	0	5	1	2	0	0	0	35	1
VVV-Venlo	2020–21	Eredivisie	16	0	1	0	–		–		17	0
Jahn Regensburg	2021–22	2. Bundesliga	18	1	1	0	–		–		19	1
Jahn Regensburg	2022–23	2. Bundesliga	20	0	1	0	–		–		21	0
Jahn Regensburg	Total		38	1	2	0	–		–		40	1
FC Ingolstadt	2023–24	3. Liga	12	0	0	0	—		2	0	14	0
Career total			180	4	11	1	2	0	4	0	197	5

=== International ===
As of matches played on 20 June 2021

Appearances and goals by national team and year
National team	Year	Apps	Goals
Gambia	2021	2	0
Total		2	0
