= Nicklas Shipnoski =

German footballer

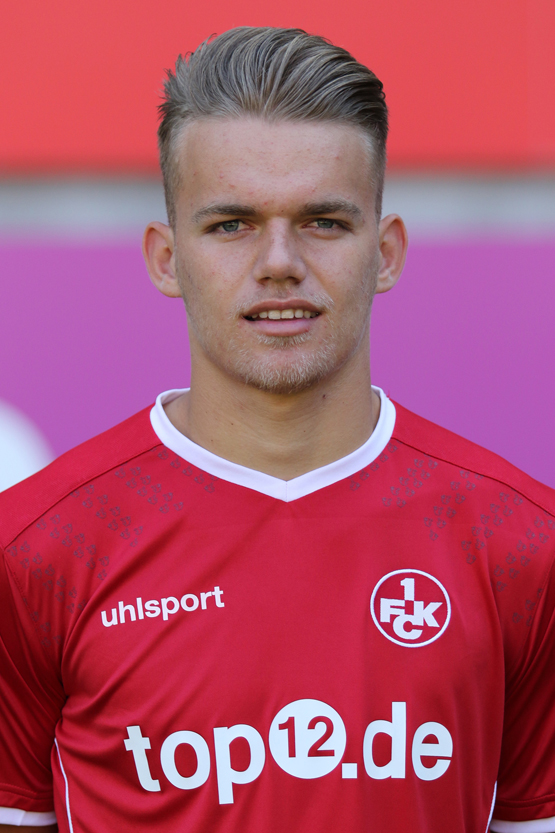
- Shipnoski with 1. FC Kaiserslautern in 2017

Personal information
- Date of birth: 1 January 1998 (age 28)
- Place of birth: Worms, Germany
- Height: 1.84 m (6 ft 0 in)
- Position: Forward

Team information
- Current team: 1. FC Kaiserslautern II
- Number: 7

Youth career
- –2006: SV Kirchheimbolanden
- 2006–2017: 1. FC Kaiserslautern

Senior career*
Years	Team	Apps	(Gls)
2016–2018	1. FC Kaiserslautern	11	(0)
2017–2018	1. FC Kaiserslautern II	21	(11)
2018–2020	Wehen Wiesbaden	35	(6)
2020–2021	1. FC Saarbrücken	33	(15)
2021–2023	Fortuna Düsseldorf	11	(0)
2022–2023	→ Jahn Regensburg (loan)	34	(2)
2023–2024	Arminia Bielefeld	32	(4)
2024–2026	Waldhof Mannheim	45	(6)
2026–	SGV Freiberg	7	(0)
2026–	1. FC Kaiserslautern II	7	(0)

International career^{‡}
2015–2016	Germany U18	5	(2)
2016–2017	Germany U19	6	(1)
2018	Germany U20	1	(0)
- * Club domestic league appearances and goals as of 24 September 2026 ‡ National team caps and goals as of 7 August 2021

Nicklas Shipnoski (born 1 January 1998) is a German professional footballer who plays as a forward for 1. FC Kaiserslautern II.

== Club career ==
On 3 July 2023, Shipnoski signed with Arminia Bielefeld.

On 12 June 2024, Shipnoski moved to Waldhof Mannheim. On 16 January 2026, his contract with Waldhof Mannheim was mutually terminated.

== International career ==
Shipnoski has represented Germany at U18, U19, and U20 levels.

== Career statistics ==
As of match played 28 May 2023

Appearances and goals by club, season and competition
Club	Season	League			Cup		Other		Total	
Club	Season	Division	Apps	Goals	Apps	Goals	Apps	Goals	Apps	Goals
1. FC Kaiserslautern	2016–17	2. Bundesliga	3	0	0	0	—		3	0
1. FC Kaiserslautern	2017–18	2. Bundesliga	8	0	1	0	—		9	0
1. FC Kaiserslautern	Total		11	0	1	0	0	0	12	0
1. FC Kaiserslautern II	2016–17	Regionalliga Südwest	2	0	—		—		2	0
Wehen Wiesbaden	2018–19	3. Liga	23	6	1	0	2	0	26	6
Wehen Wiesbaden	2019–20	2. Bundesliga	12	0	1	0	—		13	0
Wehen Wiesbaden	Total		35	6	2	0	2	0	39	6
1. FC Saarbrücken	2020–21	3. Liga	33	15	0	0	0	0	33	15
Fortuna Düsseldorf	2021–22	2. Bundesliga	11	0	1	0	0	0	12	0
Jahn Regensburg	2021–22	2. Bundesliga	12	1	0	0	0	0	12	1
Jahn Regensburg	2022–23	2. Bundesliga	22	1	1	0	0	0	23	1
Jahn Regensburg	Total		34	2	1	0	0	0	35	2
Career total			125	23	5	0	2	0	132	23
