= Charalambos Makridis =

German footballer

Personal information
- Date of birth: 5 July 1996 (age 30)
- Place of birth: Minden, Germany
- Height: 1.80 m (5 ft 11 in)
- Position: Forward

Team information
- Current team: SC Preußen Münster
- Number: 14

Youth career
- –2012: SV Kutenhausen-Todtenhausen
- 2012–2016: SC Verl

Senior career*
Years	Team	Apps	(Gls)
2016	SC Verl	18	(4)
2016–2020	Borussia Mönchengladbach	0	(0)
2016–2020	→ Borussia Mönchengladbach II	81	(22)
2020–2023	Jahn Regensburg	73	(6)
2023–2024	VfL Osnabrück	24	(2)
2024–	SC Preußen Münster	58	(2)
- * Club domestic league appearances and goals as of 18 May 2026

Charalambos Makridis (Greek: Χαράλαμπος Μακρίδης; born 5 July 1996) is a German professional footballer who plays as a forward for 3. Liga club SC Preußen Münster.

== Club career ==
He made his professional debut in the DFB-Pokal on 30 October 2019 against Borussia Dortmund.

On 21 June 2024, Makridis joined SC Preußen Münster, recently promoted to 2. Bundesliga.

== Personal ==
Makridis is of Greek descent and his family moved to Germany from Xiropotamos, Thessaloniki
