= Benedikt Saller =

German footballer

Personal information
- Date of birth: 22 September 1992 (age 34)
- Place of birth: Munich, Germany
- Height: 1.79 m (5 ft 10 in)
- Position: Defensive midfielder

Team information
- Current team: Jahn Regensburg
- Number: 6

Youth career
- –2009: 1860 Munich
- 2009–2014: Mainz 05

Senior career*
Years	Team	Apps	(Gls)
2011–2016	Mainz 05 II	127	(10)
2013–2016	Mainz 05	16	(2)
2016–	Jahn Regensburg	257	(10)
- * Club domestic league appearances and goals as of 14:26, 26 September 2026 (UTC)

Benedikt Saller is a German professional footballer who plays as a defensive midfielder for SSV Jahn Regensburg.
