= Jan-Niklas Beste =

German footballer

Personal information
- Date of birth: 4 January 1999 (age 27)
- Place of birth: Hamm, Germany
- Height: 1.74 m (5 ft 9 in)
- Positions: Left-back; winger

Team information
- Current team: SC Freiburg
- Number: 19

Youth career
- VfL Mark 1928
- –2007: Hammer SpVg
- 2007–2018: Borussia Dortmund

Senior career*
Years	Team	Apps	(Gls)
2017–2018	Borussia Dortmund	0	(0)
2018–2022	Werder Bremen	0	(0)
2018–2022	→ Werder Bremen II	28	(2)
2019–2020	→ Emmen (loan)	6	(0)
2020–2022	→ Jahn Regensburg (loan)	42	(6)
2022–2024	1. FC Heidenheim	65	(20)
2024–2025	Benfica	13	(0)
2025–	SC Freiburg	49	(2)

International career^{‡}
2014–2015	Germany U16	7	(0)
2015–2016	Germany U17	15	(2)
2017–2018	Germany U19	6	(3)
2018	Germany U20	2	(1)
- * Club domestic league appearances and goals as of 17:30, 31 October 2026 (UTC) ‡ National team caps and goals as of 16 October 2018

Jan-Niklas Beste (born 4 January 1999) is a German professional footballer who plays as a left-back or winger for Bundesliga club SC Freiburg.

== Club career ==
After joining Borussia Dortmund at the age of eight, Beste made his competitive debut for the senior squad on 12 August 2017 in a 2017–18 DFB-Pokal match-up against Rielasingen-Arlen. Despite appearing for the senior squad in pre-season friendlies that summer as well, he spent the rest of the 2017–18 season on the Under-19 squad.

On 4 July 2018, Beste moved to Werder Bremen, where he also was assigned to the reserves squad for the first season with them.

On 18 June 2019, he was loaned to FC Emmen in the Netherlands for the 2019–20 season. He made his Eredivisie debut for Emmen on 24 August 2019 in a game against Willem II.

In July 2020, he again left Werder Bremen for a loan spell, joining SSV Jahn Regensburg for two seasons.

On 15 June 2022, Beste signed a three-year contract with 1. FC Heidenheim. On 26 August 2023, he scored his club's first ever goal in the Bundesliga from a free-kick in a 3–2 home defeat against Hoffenheim.

On 11 July 2024, Beste signed a five-year contract with Primeira Liga club Benfica. On 19 September, he made his UEFA Champions League debut in a 2–1 away win over Red Star Belgrade.

In January 2025, Beste returned to Bundesliga, signing with SC Freiburg.

== International career ==
Beste was a youth international footballer for Germany. In March 2024, he was called up for the Germany national team for the friendly matches against France and the Netherlands. However, he suffered an adductor strain during training which forced him to withdraw ahead of the aforementioned fixtures.

== Career statistics ==
=== Club ===
As of match played 31 October 2026

Appearances and goals by club, season and competition
Club	Season	League			National cup (Note: Includes DFB-Pokal, Taça de Portugal)		League cup (Note: Includes Taça da Liga)		Europe		Total	
Club	Season	Division	Apps	Goals	Apps	Goals	Apps	Goals	Apps	Goals	Apps	Goals
Borussia Dortmund	2017–18	Bundesliga	0	0	1	0	0	0	—		1	0
Werder Bremen II	2018–19	Regionalliga Nord	28	2	—		—		—		28	2
Emmen (loan)	2019–20	Eredivisie	6	0	0	0	—		—		6	0
Jahn Regensburg (loan)	2020–21	2. Bundesliga	16	2	2	0	—		—		18	2
Jahn Regensburg (loan)	2021–22	2. Bundesliga	26	4	2	1	—		—		28	5
Jahn Regensburg (loan)	Total		42	6	4	1	—		—		46	7
1. FC Heidenheim	2022–23	2. Bundesliga	34	12	2	0	—		—		36	12
1. FC Heidenheim	2023–24	Bundesliga	31	8	1	0	—		—		32	8
1. FC Heidenheim	Total		65	20	3	0	—		—		68	20
Benfica	2024–25	Primeira Liga	13	0	2	2	2	0	5 (Note: Appearances in UEFA Champions League)	0	22	2
SC Freiburg	2024–25	Bundesliga	13	0	—		—		—		13	0
SC Freiburg	2025–26	Bundesliga	28	2	5	0	—		15 (Note: Appearances in UEFA Europa League)	1	48	3
SC Freiburg	2026–27	Bundesliga	8	0	2	0	—		2 (Note: Appearances in UEFA Conference League)	0	12	0
SC Freiburg	Total		49	2	7	0	—		17	1	73	3
Career total			203	30	17	3	2	0	22	1	244	34

== Honours ==
SC Freiburg

- UEFA Europa League runner-up: 2025–26
