= Julian Riedel =

German footballer (born 1991)

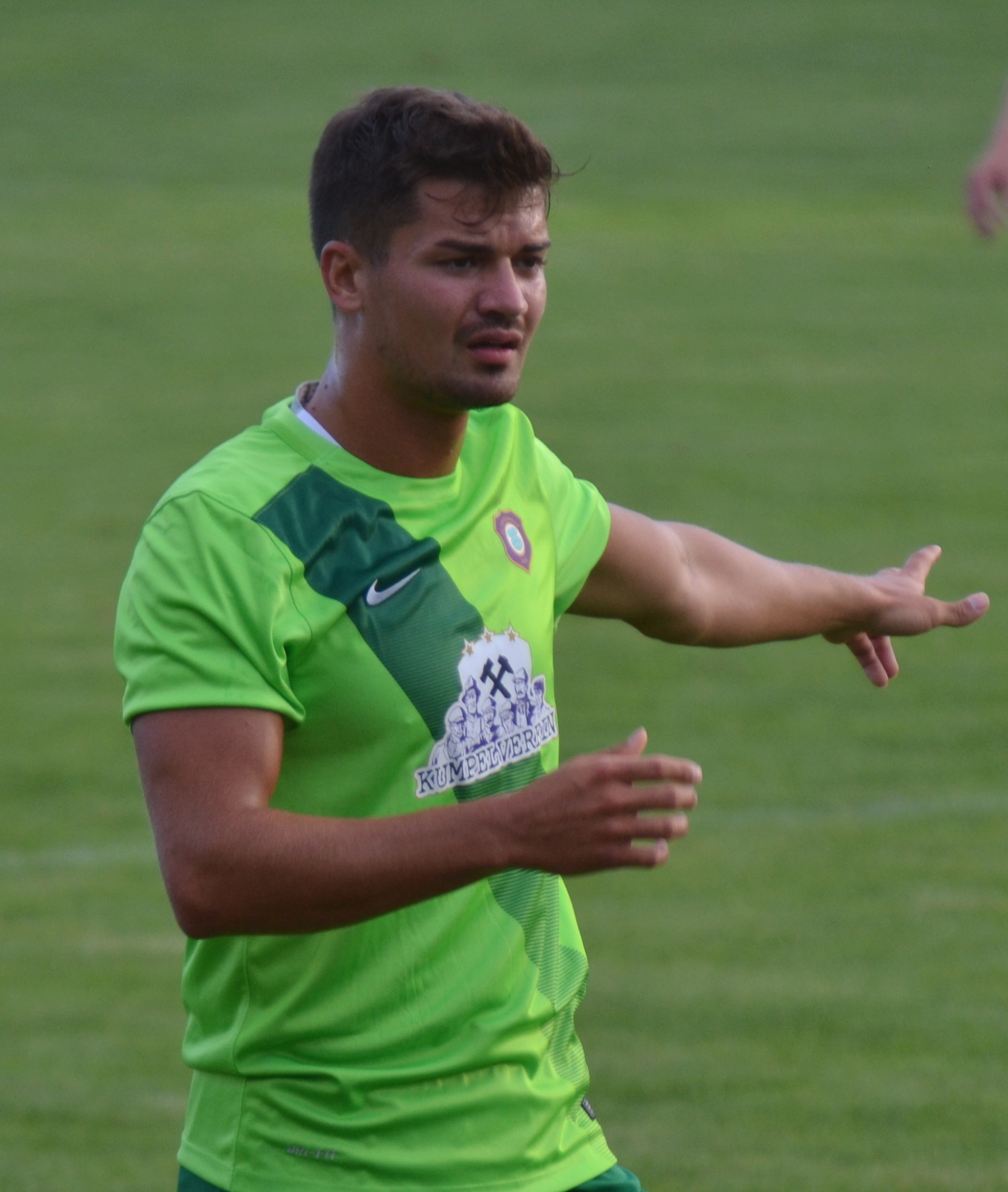
- Riedel with Erzgebirge Aue in 2016

Personal information
- Date of birth: 10 August 1991 (age 35)
- Place of birth: Leverkusen, Germany
- Height: 1.83 m (6 ft 0 in)
- Position: Defender

Team information
- Current team: 1. FC Bocholt
- Number: 3

Youth career
- 1998: TuS 05 Quettingen
- 1998–2010: Bayer Leverkusen

Senior career*
Years	Team	Apps	(Gls)
2010–2013	Bayer Leverkusen II	68	(1)
2012–2013	Bayer Leverkusen	0	(0)
2013–2015	Preußen Münster	37	(0)
2015–2017	Erzgebirge Aue	37	(0)
2017–2022	Hansa Rostock	139	(2)
2022–2024	Waldhof Mannheim	54	(0)
2024–	1. FC Bocholt	54	(0)
- * Club domestic league appearances and goals as of 24 June 2026

Julian Riedel (born 10 August 1991) is a German professional footballer who plays as a defender for 1. FC Bocholt.

== Career ==
Riedel came through Bayer Leverkusen's youth setup and made one appearance for the first team – he made his debut in a UEFA Europa League tie against Rosenborg in December 2012, and scored the decisive goal in a 1–0 win.

He signed for Preußen Münster in July 2013.

On 15 June 2022, Riedel signed with Waldhof Mannheim.

== Career statistics ==
As of match played 1 August 2020

Appearances and goals by club, season and competition
Club	Season	League			DFB-Pokal		Other		Total	
Club	Season	Division	Apps	Goals	Apps	Goals	Apps	Goals	Apps	Goals
Bayer Leverkusen II	2010–11	Regionalliga West	16	0	—		—		16	0
Bayer Leverkusen II	2011–12	Regionalliga West	14	0	—		—		14	0
Bayer Leverkusen II	2012–13	Regionalliga West	38	1	—		—		38	1
Bayer Leverkusen II	Total		68	1	—		0	0	68	1
Bayer Leverkusen	2012–13	Bundesliga	0	0	0	0	1 (Note: Appearance in the Europa League)	1	1	1
Preußen Münster	2013–14	3. Liga	23	0	0	0	—		23	0
Preußen Münster	2014–15	3. Liga	14	0	1	0	—		15	0
Preußen Münster	Total		37	0	1	0	0	0	38	0
Erzgebirge Aue	2015–16	3. Liga	25	0	1	0	—		26	0
Erzgebirge Aue	2016–17	2. Bundesliga	12	0	1	0	—		13	0
Erzgebirge Aue	Total		37	0	2	0	0	0	39	0
Hansa Rostock	2017–18	3. Liga	36	0	1	0	—		37	0
Hansa Rostock	2018–19	3. Liga	34	0	2	0	—		36	0
Hansa Rostock	2019–20	3. Liga	26	0	1	0	—		27	0
Hansa Rostock	2020–21	3. Liga	0	0	0	0	—		0	0
Hansa Rostock	Total		96	0	4	0	0	0	100	0
Career total			238	1	7	0	1	1	246	2
