= Alexander Weidinger =

German footballer

Personal information
- Date of birth: 18 June 1997 (age 29)
- Place of birth: Regensburg, Germany
- Height: 1.97 m (6 ft 6 in)
- Position: Goalkeeper

Team information
- Current team: Jahn Regensburg)
- Number: 32

Youth career
- –2016: Jahn Regensburg

Senior career*
Years	Team	Apps	(Gls)
2016–	Jahn Regensburg II	46	(0)
2017–	Jahn Regensburg	14	(0)
2021–2022	→ SpVgg Unterhaching (loan)	18	(0)
- * Club domestic league appearances and goals as of 14:54, 26 September 2026 (UTC)

Alexander Weidinger (born 18 June 1997) is a German professional footballer who plays as a goalkeeper for Jahn Regensburg. For half a season he was loaned to SpVgg Unterhaching.
