= Konrad Faber =

German footballer

Personal information
- Date of birth: 14 November 1997 (age 28)
- Place of birth: Breisach, Germany
- Height: 1.79 m (5 ft 10 in)
- Position: Midfielder

Team information
- Current team: VfL Osnabrück
- Number: 28

Youth career
- –2014: FC Emmendingen
- 2014–2017: Freiburger FC

Senior career*
Years	Team	Apps	(Gls)
2015–2018	Freiburger FC	6	(0)
2018–2021	SC Freiburg II	61	(5)
2021–2024	Jahn Regensburg	90	(2)
2024–2026	St. Gallen	31	(1)
2025–2026	→ Dynamo Dresden (loan)	23	(0)
2026–	VfL Osnabrück	0	(0)
- * Club domestic league appearances and goals as of 18 May 2026

Konrad Faber (born 4 November 1997) is a German professional footballer who plays as a midfielder for 2. Bundesliga team VfL Osnabrück.

== Career ==
In summer 2021, he joined Jahn Regensburg and made his debut in the 2. Bundesliga against Darmstadt 98.

On 31 May 2024, Faber signed a three-year contract with St. Gallen in Switzerland. On 26 June 2025, Faber moved on a season-long loan to Dynamo Dresden.

On 7 July 2026, Faber moved to VfL Osnabrück in 2. Bundesliga.
