= Steve Breitkreuz =

German professional footballer

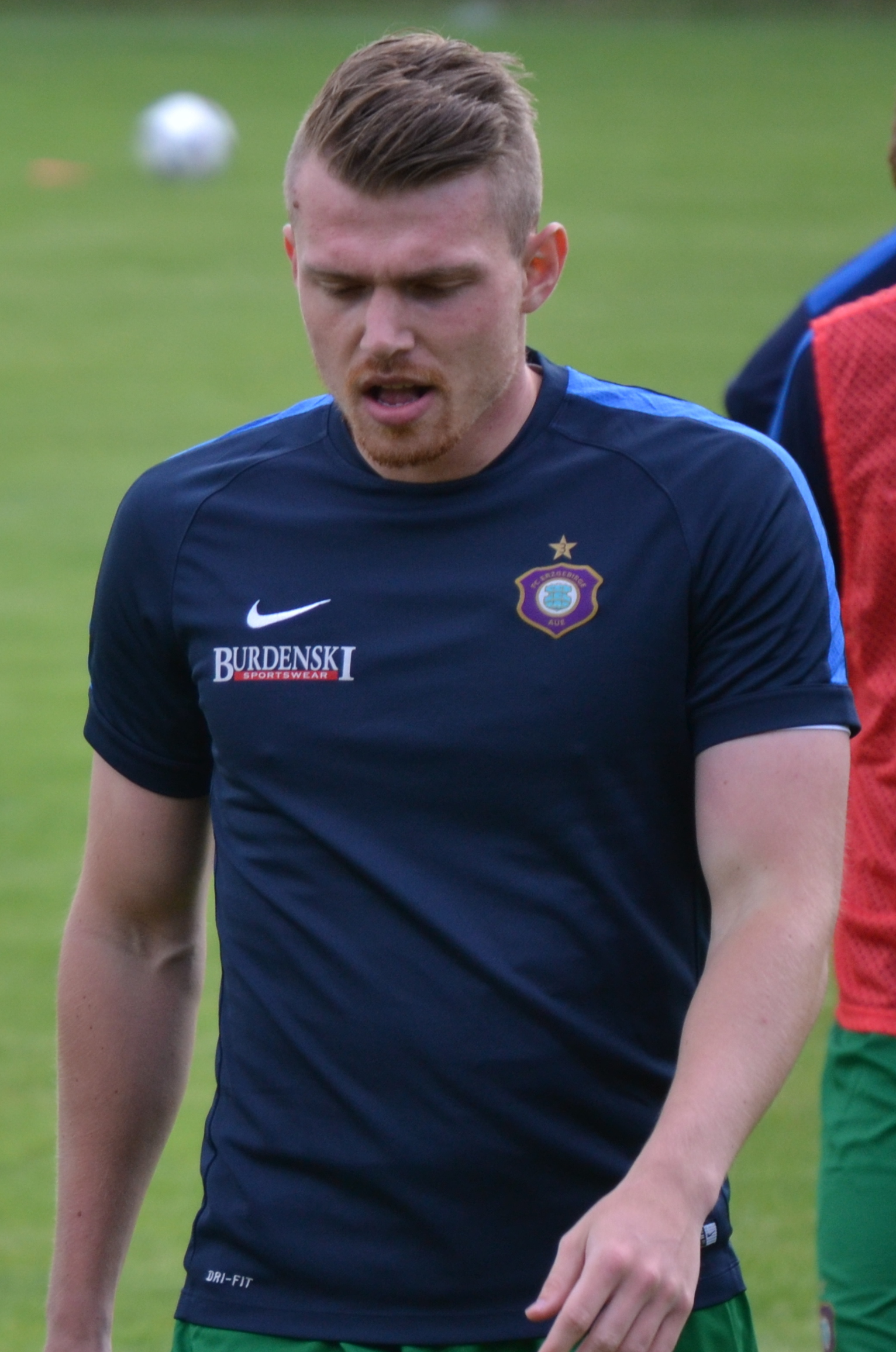
- Breitkreuz in 2016

Personal information
- Date of birth: 18 January 1992 (age 34)
- Place of birth: Berlin, Germany
- Height: 1.89 m (6 ft 2 in)
- Position: Defender

Youth career
- –2006: Lichterfelder FC
- 2006–2011: Hertha BSC

Senior career*
Years	Team	Apps	(Gls)
2011–2015	Hertha BSC II	70	(5)
2015–2017	Erzgebirge Aue	70	(6)
2017–2018	Eintracht Braunschweig	15	(0)
2018–2021	Erzgebirge Aue	43	(0)
2021–2023	SSV Jahn Regensburg	51	(3)
2023–2026	Bayern Munich II	49	(6)
- * Club domestic league appearances and goals as of 22:45, 1 March 2025 (UTC)

Steve Breitkreuz (born 18 January 1992) is a German professional footballer who plays as a defender. He is the twin brother of fellow footballer Patrick Breitkreuz.

== Career ==
Breitkreuz joined Erzgebirge Aue from Hertha BSC II in 2015. On 1 June 2017, Eintracht Braunschweig announced his signing on a three-year contract. A year later, he returned to Erzgebirge Aue for the 2018–19 season having signed a three-year contract.

In the summer of 2021, he joined SSV Jahn Regensburg.

On 4 July 2023, Breitkreuz signed with Regionalliga Bayern club Bayern Munich II, ahead of the 2023–24 season.
