= Carlo Boukhalfa =

German footballer (born 1999)

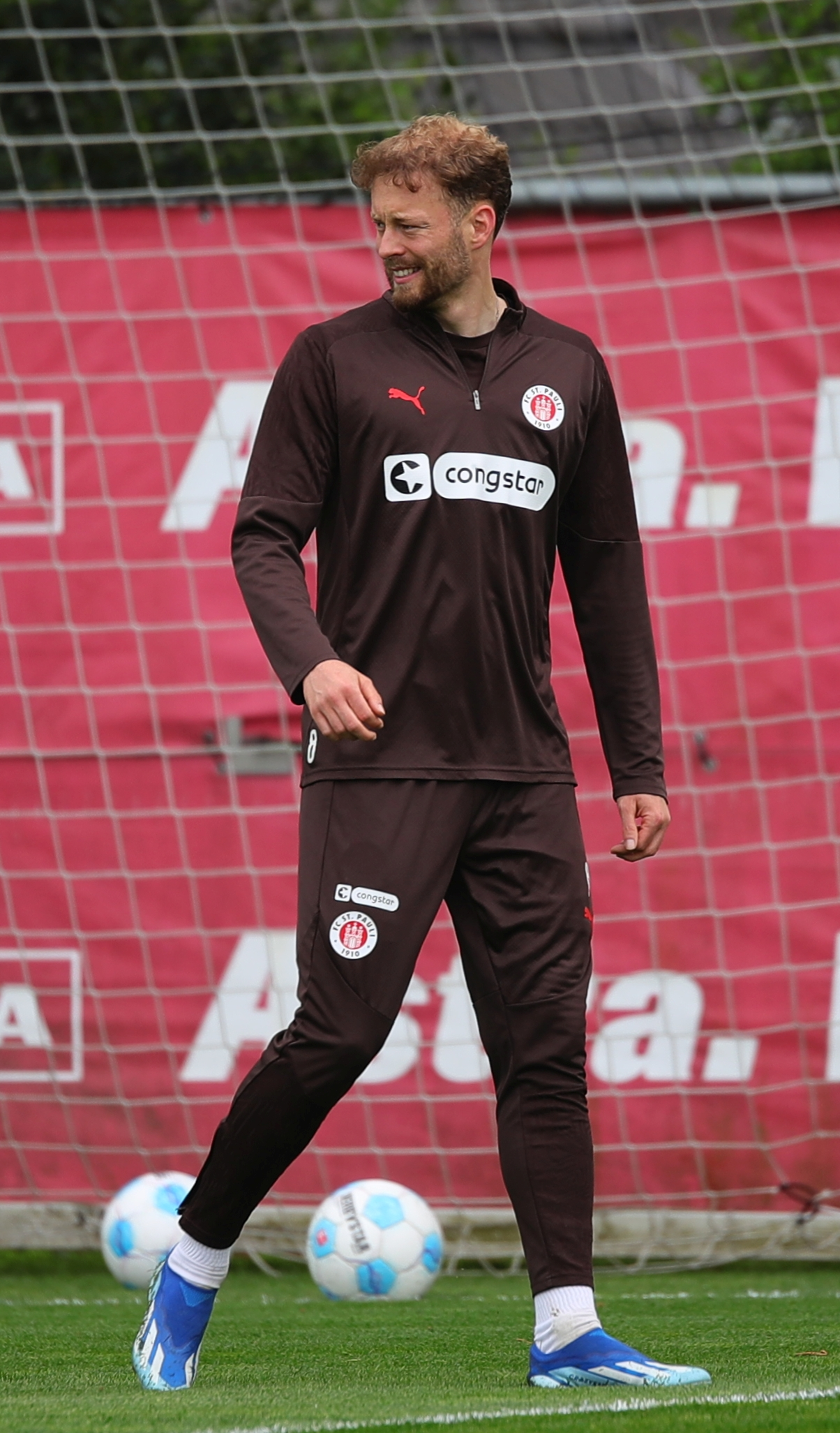
- Carlo Boukhalfa in 2025

Personal information
- Full name: Carlo Gregor Boukhalfa
- Date of birth: 3 May 1999 (age 27)
- Place of birth: Freiburg im Breisgau, Germany
- Height: 1.85 m (6 ft 1 in)
- Position: Midfielder

Team information
- Current team: St. Gallen
- Number: 11

Youth career
- –2012: PTSV Jahn Freiburg
- 2012–2018: SC Freiburg

Senior career*
Years	Team	Apps	(Gls)
2018–2021	SC Freiburg II	54	(8)
2020–2022	SC Freiburg	0	(0)
2021–2022	→ Jahn Regensburg (loan)	31	(4)
2022–2025	FC St. Pauli	51	(3)
2022	FC St. Pauli II	1	(0)
2025–	St. Gallen	42	(13)
- * Club domestic league appearances and goals as of 28 September 2026

Carlo Gregor Boukhalfa (born 3 May 1999) is a German professional footballer who plays as a midfielder for Swiss club St. Gallen.

== Career ==
Boukhalfa made his professional debut for SC Freiburg in the first round of the 2020–21 DFB-Pokal on 13 September 2020, coming on as a half-time substitute for Yannik Keitel in the away match against 3. Liga side Waldhof Mannheim. In summer 2021, he was loaned to SSV Jahn Regensburg for one season.

On 27 May 2021, it was announced that Boukhalfa had signed for 2. Bundesliga club FC St. Pauli on a permanent basis.

On 1 July 2025, Boukhalfa signed a two-season contract with St. Gallen in Switzerland.

== Personal life ==
Born in Germany, Boukhalfa is of Algerian descent.

== Career statistics ==
As of match played 28 September 2026

Appearances and goals by club, season and competition
Club	Season	League			National Cup		Total	
Club	Season	Division	Apps	Goals	Apps	Goals	Apps	Goals
SC Freiburg II	2018–19	Regionalliga Südwest	15	0	–		15	0
SC Freiburg II	2019–20	Regionalliga Südwest	23	6	–		23	6
SC Freiburg II	2020–21	Regionalliga Südwest	16	2	–		16	2
SC Freiburg II	Total		54	8	–		54	8
SC Freiburg	2020–21	Bundesliga	0	0	1	0	1	0
Jahn Regensburg	2021–22	2. Bundesliga	31	4	2	0	33	4
FC St. Pauli	2022–23	2. Bundesliga	9	0	1	0	10	0
FC St. Pauli	2023–24	2. Bundesliga	17	1	2	1	19	2
FC St. Pauli	2024–25	Bundesliga	25	2	2	0	27	2
FC St. Pauli	Total		51	3	5	1	56	4
FC St. Pauli II	2022–23	Regionalliga Nord	1	0	–		1	0
FC St. Gallen	2025–26	Swiss Super League	36	12	5	2	41	14
FC St. Gallen	2026–27	Swiss Super League	6	1	0	0	6	1
FC St. Gallen	Total		42	13	5	2	47	15
Career total			179	28	13	3	192	31

== Honours ==
FC St. Pauli

- 2.Bundesliga: 2023–24
