= Kaan Çalışkaner =

German footballer (born 1999)

Personal information
- Date of birth: 3 November 1999 (age 26)
- Place of birth: Cologne, Germany
- Height: 1.92 m (6 ft 4 in)
- Positions: Centre-forward; central midfielder

Team information
- Current team: 1. FC Saarbrücken
- Number: 22

Youth career
- –2017: Bergisch Gladbach
- 2018: 1. FC Köln

Senior career*
Years	Team	Apps	(Gls)
2018–2020	1. FC Köln II	41	(10)
2020–2023	Jahn Regensburg	78	(8)
2023–2024	Eintracht Braunschweig	11	(0)
2024	→ Jagiellonia Białystok (loan)	14	(2)
2024	→ Jagiellonia Białystok II (loan)	1	(0)
2024–2025	Motor Lublin	25	(1)
2025–	1. FC Saarbrücken	13	(1)
- * Club domestic league appearances and goals as of 30 May 2026

Kaan Çalışkaner (born 3 November 1999) is a German professional footballer who plays as a centre-forward or central midfielder for 3. Liga club 1. FC Saarbrücken.

== Career ==
In July 2020, Çalışkaner signed for Jahn Regensburg on a three-year contract. He made his professional debut for Jahn Regensburg in the 2020–21 DFB-Pokal on 13 September 2020, starting in the home match against 3. Liga side 1. FC Kaiserslautern.

On 18 July 2023, Çalışkaner signed a two-year contract with Eintracht Braunschweig. On 10 January 2024, he joined Ekstraklasa club Jagiellonia Białystok on loan until the end of the season. He scored once in 14 league appearances as Jagiellonia won the first top-flight title in the club's history, before going back to Eintracht in June 2024.

Çalışkaner returned to Poland for the following season, after signing a one-year deal with newly promoted Motor Lublin on 16 July 2024.

On 17 September 2025, Çalışkaner joined 3. Liga club 1. FC Saarbrücken.

== Personal life ==
Born in Germany, Çalışkaner is of Turkish descent.

== Honours ==
Jagiellonia Białystok

- Ekstraklasa: 2023–24
