= Mersad Selimbegović =

Bosnian footballer

Personal information
- Date of birth: 29 April 1982 (age 44)
- Place of birth: Rogatica, SR Bosnia and Herzegovina, SFR Yugoslavia
- Position: Defender

Team information
- Current team: Alemannia Aachen (manager)

Senior career*
Years	Team	Apps	(Gls)
2004–2005	Žepče		
2005–2006	Željezničar		
2006–2012	Jahn Regensburg	69	(0)

Managerial career
- 2019–2023: Jahn Regensburg
- 2023–2024: Hansa Rostock
- 2024–2025: Eupen
- 2025–: Alemannia Aachen
- * Club domestic league appearances and goals

Mersad Selimbegović (born 29 April 1982) is a Bosnian professional football coach and former player who manages Alemannia Aachen.

== Career ==
Before Rostock, he managed Jahn Regensburg. He left Hansa Rostock at the end of the 2023–24 season following relegation.

In August 2024 he became manager of Belgian club Eupen. In November 2025 he returned to Germany with Alemannia Aachen.
