= List of German football transfers summer 2021 =

This is a list of German football transfers in the summer transfer window 2021 by club. Only transfers of the Bundesliga, and 2. Bundesliga are included.

== Bundesliga ==
Note: Flags indicate national team as has been defined under FIFA eligibility rules. Players may hold more than one non-FIFA nationality.

=== FC Bayern Munich ===
In:

No.	Pos.	Nation	Player
2	DF	FRA	Dayot Upamecano (from RB Leipzig)
3	DF	ENG	Omar Richards (from Reading)
26	GK	GER	Sven Ulreich (from Hamburger SV)

Out:

No.	Pos.	Nation	Player
8	MF	ESP	Javi Martínez (to Qatar SC)
11	MF	BRA	Douglas Costa (loan return to Juventus)
15	FW	GER	Fiete Arp (on loan to Holstein Kiel)
17	DF	GER	Jérôme Boateng (free agent)
27	DF	AUT	David Alaba (to Real Madrid)
28	MF	POR	Tiago Dantas (loan return to Benfica)
35	GK	GER	Alexander Nübel (on loan to Monaco)
36	MF	GER	Angelo Stiller (to 1899 Hoffenheim)
—	DF	GER	Lars Lukas Mai (on loan to Werder Bremen, previously on loan at Darmstadt 98)
—	MF	GER	Adrian Fein (on loan to Greuther Fürth, previously on loan at PSV)
—	FW	NED	Joshua Zirkzee (on loan to Anderlecht, previously on loan at Parma)

=== RB Leipzig ===
In:

No.	Pos.	Nation	Player
2	DF	FRA	Mohamed Simakan (from Strasbourg)
3	DF	ESP	Angeliño (from Manchester City, previously on loan)
21	FW	NED	Brian Brobbey (from Ajax)
32	DF	CRO	Joško Gvardiol (from Dinamo Zagreb)
33	FW	POR	André Silva (from Eintracht Frankfurt)
39	DF	GER	Benjamin Henrichs (from Monaco, previously on loan)
—	MF	USA	Caden Clark (from New York Red Bulls)

Out:

No.	Pos.	Nation	Player
5	DF	FRA	Dayot Upamecano (to Bayern Munich)
6	DF	FRA	Ibrahima Konaté (to Liverpool)
19	FW	NOR	Alexander Sørloth (on loan to Real Sociedad)
20	MF	GER	Lazar Samardžić (to Udinese)
21	FW	NED	Justin Kluivert (loan return to Roma)
35	MF	GER	Fabrice Hartmann (on loan to SC Paderborn)
—	MF	USA	Caden Clark (on loan to New York Red Bulls)
—	MF	AUT	Hannes Wolf (to Borussia Mönchengladbach, previously on loan)

=== Borussia Dortmund ===
In:

No.	Pos.	Nation	Player
1	GK	SUI	Gregor Kobel (from VfB Stuttgart)
4	DF	FRA	Soumaïla Coulibaly (from Paris Saint-Germain Academy)
21	FW	NED	Donyell Malen (from PSV)
32	MF	FRA	Abdoulaye Kamara (from Paris Saint-Germain)

Out:

No.	Pos.	Nation	Player
6	MF	DEN	Thomas Delaney (to Sevilla)
7	FW	ENG	Jadon Sancho (to Manchester United)
26	DF	POL	Łukasz Piszczek (to Goczałkowice-Zdrój)
—	DF	GER	Jeremy Toljan (to Sassuolo, previously on loan)
—	DF	ARG	Leonardo Balerdi (to Marseille, previously on loan)
—	MF	ESP	Sergio Gómez (to Anderlecht, previously on loan at Huesca)

=== VfL Wolfsburg ===
In:

No.	Pos.	Nation	Player
3	DF	BEL	Sebastiaan Bornauw (from 1. FC Köln)
8	MF	BEL	Aster Vranckx (from Mechelen)
10	FW	GER	Lukas Nmecha (from Manchester City, previously on loan at Anderlecht)
17	FW	GER	Maximilian Philipp (from Dynamo Moscow, previously on loan)
22	MF	ENG	Felix Nmecha (from Manchester City)
28	FW	GER	Luca Waldschmidt (from Benfica)

Out:

No.	Pos.	Nation	Player
5	DF	NED	Jeffrey Bruma (to Kasımpaşa)
29	FW	EGY	Omar Marmoush (on loan to VfB Stuttgart)
35	GK	GER	Lino Kasten (on loan to St. Pölten)
39	DF	GER	Tim Siersleben (on loan to 1. FC Heidenheim)
40	MF	BRA	João Victor (to Al Jazira)
—	MF	USA	Bryang Kayo (on loan to Viktoria Berlin)
—	FW	KOR	Hong Yun-sang (on loan to St. Pölten)
—	MF	GER	Elvis Rexhbeçaj (on loan to VfL Bochum, previously on loan at 1. FC Köln)
—	FW	USA	Ulysses Llanez (on loan to St. Pölten, previously on loan at Heerenveen)
—	MF	GER	Felix Klaus (to Fortuna Düsseldorf, previously on loan)

=== Eintracht Frankfurt ===
In:

No.	Pos.	Nation	Player
19	FW	COL	Rafael Santos Borré (from River Plate)
23	MF	NOR	Jens Petter Hauge (on loan from Milan)
25	DF	GER	Christopher Lenz (from Union Berlin)
28	FW	ESP	Fabio Blanco (from Valencia Juvenil)
29	MF	DEN	Jesper Lindstrøm (from Brøndby)
31	GK	GER	Jens Grahl (from VfB Stuttgart)
38	FW	ESP	Enrique Herrero (from Villarreal Juvenil)
40	GK	GER	Diant Ramaj (from 1. FC Heidenheim)
—	FW	TUR	Ali Akman (from Bursaspor)

Out:

No.	Pos.	Nation	Player
9	FW	SRB	Luka Jović (loan return to Real Madrid)
23	GK	GER	Markus Schubert (loan return to Schalke 04)
30	DF	NED	Jetro Willems (to Greuther Fürth)
33	FW	POR	André Silva (to RB Leipzig)
34	FW	ANG	Jabez Makanda (free agent)
36	MF	AUT	Lukas Fahrnberger (free agent)
38	DF	GER	Yannick Brugger (to Admira Wacker)
40	GK	GER	Elias Bördner (on loan to Viktoria Köln)
42	DF	GER	Felix Irorere (to Karlsruher SC)
43	DF	GER	Fynn Otto (on loan to Hallescher FC)
—	FW	TUR	Ali Akman (on loan to NEC Nijmegen)
—	MF	URU	Rodrigo Zalazar (on loan to Schalke 04, previously on loan at FC St. Pauli)
—	GK	DEN	Frederik Rønnow (to Union Berlin, previously on loan at Schalke 04)
—	MF	GER	Nils Stendera (to Hessen Kassel, previously on loan at Lok Leipzig)
—	FW	SRB	Dejan Joveljić (to LA Galaxy, previously on loan at Wolfsberger AC)

=== Bayer 04 Leverkusen ===
In:

No.	Pos.	Nation	Player
5	DF	NED	Mitchel Bakker (from Paris Saint-Germain)
6	DF	CIV	Odilon Kossounou (from Club Brugge)
8	MF	GER	Robert Andrich (from Union Berlin)
29	MF	DEN	Zidan Sertdemir (from Nordsjælland youth)
31	FW	FRA	Amine Adli (from Toulouse)
33	DF	ECU	Piero Hincapié (from Talleres)
40	GK	RUS	Andrey Lunyov (from Zenit)

Out:

No.	Pos.	Nation	Player
2	DF	COL	Santiago Arias (loan return to Atlético Madrid)
5	MF	GER	Sven Bender (to TSV Brannenburg)
6	DF	AUT	Aleksandar Dragović (to Red Star Belgrade)
8	MF	GER	Lars Bender (to TSV Brannenburg)
9	FW	JAM	Leon Bailey (to Aston Villa)
16	DF	CRO	Tin Jedvaj (to Lokomotiv Moscow)
18	DF	BRA	Wendell (to Porto)
28	MF	ENG	Demarai Gray (to Everton)
32	FW	TUR	Samed Onur (to Fatih Karagümrük)
39	MF	TUR	Cem Türkmen (to Clermont)
—	FW	GER	Yannik Schlößer (on loan to 1. FC Nürnberg II)

=== 1. FC Union Berlin ===
In:

No.	Pos.	Nation	Player
3	DF	GER	Paul Jaeckel (from Greuther Fürth)
4	DF	NED	Rick van Drongelen (from Hamburger SV)
7	MF	GER	Levin Öztunalı (from Mainz 05)
8	MF	GER	Rani Khedira (from FC Augsburg)
9	FW	GER	Andreas Voglsammer (from Arminia Bielefeld)
14	FW	NGA	Taiwo Awoniyi (from Liverpool, previously on loan)
15	MF	POL	Paweł Wszołek (from Legia Warsaw)
17	FW	GER	Kevin Behrens (from SV Sandhausen)
18	MF	JPN	Keita Endo (from Yokohama F. Marinos, previously on loan)
19	GK	DEN	Frederik Rønnow (from Eintracht Frankfurt, previously on loan at Schalke 04)
24	MF	JPN	Genki Haraguchi (from Hannover 96)
25	DF	GER	Timo Baumgartl (on loan from PSV)
26	DF	POL	Tymoteusz Puchacz (from Lech Poznań)
—	MF	GER	Julius Kade (from Dynamo Dresden)

Out:

No.	Pos.	Nation	Player
4	DF	GER	Nico Schlotterbeck (loan return to SC Freiburg)
7	MF	GER	Akaki Gogia (to Zürich)
9	FW	FIN	Joel Pohjanpalo (loan return to Bayer Leverkusen)
15	FW	GER	Marius Bülter (to Schalke 04)
19	DF	GER	Florian Hübner (to 1. FC Nürnberg)
20	GK	GER	Loris Karius (loan return to Liverpool)
24	FW	CRO	Petar Musa (loan return to Slavia Prague)
25	DF	GER	Christopher Lenz (to Eintracht Frankfurt)
30	MF	GER	Robert Andrich (to Bayer Leverkusen)
34	MF	GER	Christian Gentner (to Luzern)
—	GK	GER	Nikolai Kemlein (to Hertha BSC II)
—	MF	GER	Nicolai Rapp (to Werder Bremen, previously on loan at Darmstadt 98)
—	MF	GER	Julius Kade (to Dynamo Dresden)

=== Borussia Mönchengladbach ===
In:

No.	Pos.	Nation	Player
11	MF	AUT	Hannes Wolf (from RB Leipzig, previously on loan)
20	DF	GER	Luca Netz (from Hertha BSC)

Out:

No.	Pos.	Nation	Player
3	DF	SUI	Michael Lang (to Basel)
16	MF	GUI	Ibrahima Traoré (free agent)
17	DF	SWE	Oscar Wendt (to Göteborg)
19	MF	AUT	Valentino Lazaro (loan return to Inter Milan)
20	FW	PAR	Julio Villalba (to Guayaquil City)
31	GK	GER	Max Grün (to Viktoria Aschaffenburg)
43	MF	BEL	Rocco Reitz (on loan to Sint-Truiden)
—	GK	GER	Moritz Nicolas (on loan to Viktoria Köln, previously on loan at VfL Osnabrück)
—	DF	DEN	Andreas Poulsen (on loan to FC Ingolstadt, previously on loan at Austria Wien)

=== VfB Stuttgart ===
In:

No.	Pos.	Nation	Player
1	GK	GER	Florian Müller (from Mainz 05, previously on loan at SC Freiburg)
5	DF	GRE	Konstantinos Mavropanos (loan extension from Arsenal)
8	MF	FRA	Enzo Millot (from Monaco)
17	FW	EGY	Omar Marmoush (on loan from VfL Wolfsburg)
19	FW	DEN	Wahid Faghir (from Vejle Boldklub)
22	FW	GER	Chris Führich (from SC Paderborn)
27	FW	AUS	Alou Kuol (from Central Coast Mariners)
32	MF	FRA	Naouirou Ahamada (from Juventus B, previously on loan)
34	MF	TUR	Ömer Faruk Beyaz (from Fenerbahçe)
37	DF	JPN	Hiroki Itō (on loan from Júbilo Iwata)

Out:

No.	Pos.	Nation	Player
1	GK	SUI	Gregor Kobel (to Borussia Dortmund)
8	MF	GER	Gonzalo Castro (free agent)
13	GK	GER	Jens Grahl (to Eintracht Frankfurt)
19	MF	MKD	Darko Churlinov (on loan to Schalke 04)
22	FW	ARG	Nicolás González (to Fiorentina)
26	DF	GER	Antonis Aidonis (on loan to Dynamo Dresden)
35	DF	POL	Marcin Kamiński (to Schalke 04)
36	MF	GER	Luca Mack (to Újpest)
—	DF	GER	Maxime Awoudja (on loan to WSG Tirol, previously on loat at Türkgücü München)
—	DF	ESP	Pablo Maffeo (on loan to Mallorca, previously on loan at Huesca)

=== SC Freiburg ===
In:

No.	Pos.	Nation	Player
8	MF	GER	Maximilian Eggestein (from Werder Bremen)

Out:

No.	Pos.	Nation	Player
8	MF	FRA	Baptiste Santamaria (to Rennes)
14	MF	NED	Guus Til (loan return to Spartak Moscow)
21	GK	GER	Florian Müller (loan return to Mainz 05)
28	MF	KOR	Kwon Chang-hoon (to Suwon Bluewings)
34	MF	GER	Lino Tempelmann (on loan to 1. FC Nürnberg)
39	MF	GER	Carlo Boukhalfa (on loan to Jahn Regensburg)
40	GK	GER	Niclas Thiede (on loan to SC Verl)
—	DF	ENG	Chima Okoroji (to SV Sandhausen, previously on loan at SC Paderborn)
—	MF	ALB	Amir Abrashi (to Grasshoppers, previously on loat at Basel)
—	MF	GER	Florian Kath (to 1. FC Magdeburg, previously on loan)
—	MF	AUS	Brandon Borrello (to Dynamo Dresden, previously on loan at Fortuna Düsseldorf)

=== 1899 Hoffenheim ===
In:

No.	Pos.	Nation	Player
13	MF	GER	Angelo Stiller (from Bayern Munich)
16	MF	GER	Sebastian Rudy (from Schalke 04, previously on loan)
17	DF	GER	David Raum (from Greuther Fürth)

Out:

No.	Pos.	Nation	Player
5	DF	GRE	Kostas Stafylidis (on loan to VfL Bochum)
17	DF	ENG	Ryan Sessegnon (loan return to Tottenham Hotspur)
19	FW	ALG	Ishak Belfodil (to Hertha BSC)
28	DF	USA	Chris Richards (loan return to Bayern Munich)
35	FW	GER	Maximilian Beier (on loan to Hannover 96)
—	DF	NED	Justin Hoogma (on loan to Greuther Fürth, previously on loan at Utrecht)
—	MF	ISR	Ilay Elmkies (on loan to Admira Wacker, previously on loan at ADO Den Haag)

=== 1. FSV Mainz 05 ===
In:

No.	Pos.	Nation	Player
6	MF	GER	Anton Stach (from Greuther Fürth)
7	MF	KOR	Lee Jae-sung (from Holstein Kiel)
23	DF	ANG	Anderson Lucoqui (from Arminia Bielefeld)
30	DF	SUI	Silvan Widmer (from Basel)

Out:

No.	Pos.	Nation	Player
6	MF	GER	Danny Latza (to Schalke 04)
7	FW	SWE	Robin Quaison (to Al-Ettifaq)
8	MF	GER	Levin Öztunalı (to Union Berlin)
9	FW	GER	Robert Glatzel (loan return to Cardiff City)
14	MF	CMR	Pierre Kunde (to Olympiacos)
15	DF	GER	Luca Kilian (on loan to 1. FC Köln)
22	DF	GER	Danny da Costa (loan return to Eintracht Frankfurt)
23	DF	AUT	Phillipp Mwene (to PSV)
36	FW	AUT	Marlon Mustapha (on loan to Admira Wacker)
—	DF	GER	Jonathan Meier (on loan to Hansa Rostock, previously on loan at Dynamo Dresden)
—	FW	GHA	Abass Issah (on loan to Rijeka, previously on loan at Twente)
—	GK	GER	Florian Müller (to VfB Stuttgart, previously on loan at SC Freiburg)
—	FW	KOR	Ji Dong-won (to FC Seoul, previously on loan at Eintracht Braunschweig)

=== FC Augsburg ===
In:

No.	Pos.	Nation	Player
10	MF	GER	Arne Maier (on loan from Hertha BSC, previously on loan at Arminia Bielefeld)
25	GK	GER	Daniel Klein (from 1899 Hoffenheim II)
29	FW	GER	Lasse Günther (from Bayern Munich II)
30	MF	GER	Niklas Dorsch (from Gent)

Out:

No.	Pos.	Nation	Player
5	DF	CZE	Marek Suchý (to Mladá Boleslav)
8	MF	GER	Rani Khedira (to Union Berlin)
18	MF	SVK	László Bénes (loan return to Borussia Mönchengladbach)
23	FW	GER	Marco Richter (to Hertha BSC)
39	GK	GER	Benjamin Leneis (on loan to 1. FC Magdeburg)
45	FW	GER	Lukas Petkov (on loan to SC Verl)
—	FW	GER	Julian Schieber (retired)
—	DF	GER	Felix Götze (loan extension to 1. FC Kaiserslautern)
—	DF	CRO	Jozo Stanić (on loan to Wehen Wiesbaden, previously on loan at FSV Zwickau)
—	DF	AUT	Kevin Danso (to Lens, previously on loan at Fortuna Düsseldorf)

=== Hertha BSC ===
In:

No.	Pos.	Nation	Player
8	MF	GER	Suat Serdar (from Schalke 04)
10	MF	NED	Jurgen Ekkelenkamp (from Ajax)
14	FW	ALG	Ishak Belfodil (from 1899 Hoffenheim)
15	FW	MNE	Stevan Jovetić (from Monaco)
23	FW	GER	Marco Richter (from FC Augsburg)
27	MF	GHA	Kevin-Prince Boateng (from Monza)
32	GK	DEN	Oliver Christensen (from OB)

Out:

No.	Pos.	Nation	Player
7	FW	AUS	Mathew Leckie (to Melbourne City)
8	MF	FRA	Matteo Guendouzi (loan return to Arsenal)
10	FW	BRA	Matheus Cunha (to Atlético Madrid)
14	DF	PAR	Omar Alderete (on loan to Valencia)
15	FW	COL	Jhon Córdoba (to Krasnodar)
23	MF	GER	Eduard Löwen (on loan to VfL Bochum)
24	FW	SRB	Nemanja Radonjić (loan return to Marseille)
27	FW	GER	Jessic Ngankam (on loan to Greuther Fürth)
28	MF	GER	Sami Khedira (retired)
32	DF	GER	Luca Netz (to Borussia Mönchengladbach)
—	MF	GER	Arne Maier (on loan to FC Augsburg, previously on loan at Arminia Bielefeld)

=== Arminia Bielefeld ===
In:

No.	Pos.	Nation	Player
3	DF	POR	Guilherme Ramos (from Feirense)
8	MF	AUT	Alessandro Schöpf (from Schalke 04)
10	FW	FRA	Bryan Lasme (from Sochaux)
11	MF	JPN	Masaya Okugawa (from Red Bull Salzburg, previously on loan)
13	GK	GRE	Stefanos Kapino (from Werder Bremen, previously on loan at SV Sandhausen)
18	FW	GER	Florian Krüger (from Erzgebirge Aue)
20	MF	AUT	Patrick Wimmer (from Austria Wien)
21	MF	GER	Robin Hack (from 1. FC Nürnberg)
23	FW	GER	Janni Serra (from Holstein Kiel)
39	MF	GRE	Sebastian Vasiliadis (from SC Paderborn)
—	DF	GER	Lennart Czyborra (on loan from Genoa)

Out:

No.	Pos.	Nation	Player
4	DF	ANG	Anderson Lucoqui (to Mainz 05)
6	DF	NED	Mike van der Hoorn (on loan to Utrecht)
7	FW	AUT	Christian Gebauer (on loan to FC Ingolstadt)
8	FW	JPN	Ritsu Dōan (loan return to PSV)
10	MF	GER	Reinhold Yabo (retired)
14	FW	FRO	Jóan Símun Edmundsson (to Waasland-Beveren)
17	MF	BEN	Cebio Soukou (to SV Sandhausen)
18	FW	VEN	Sergio Córdova (loan return to FC Augsburg)
20	MF	GER	Nils Seufert (to Greuther Fürth)
21	FW	GER	Andreas Voglsammer (to Union Berlin)
28	MF	NED	Michel Vlap (loan return to Anderlecht)
30	MF	GER	Marcel Hartel (to FC St. Pauli)
31	MF	GER	Arne Maier (loan return to Hertha BSC)
33	GK	GER	Nikolai Rehnen (free agent)
34	GK	SWE	Oscar Linnér (on loan to Brescia)
36	FW	GER	Sven Schipplock (to VfB Stuttgart II)
38	MF	GER	Jomaine Consbruch (on loan to Eintracht Braunschweig)
—	FW	GER	Noel Niemann (on loan to TSV Hartberg, previously on loan at Türkgücü München)
—	FW	GER	Sebastian Müller (on loan to Eintracht Braunschweig, previously on loan at VfL Osnabrück)
—	DF	GER	Can Özkan (to Fortuna Düsseldorf II, previously on loan at Næstved)
—	MF	GER	Joey Müller (to Schalke 04 II, previously on loan at Wuppertaler SV)
—	FW	GER	Mervin Kalac (to SC Paderborn II, previously on loan at SV Lippstadt)

=== 1. FC Köln ===
In:

No.	Pos.	Nation	Player
4	DF	GER	Timo Hübers (from Hannover 96)
7	MF	AUT	Dejan Ljubicic (from Rapid Wien)
13	FW	GER	Mark Uth (from Schalke 04)
20	GK	GER	Marvin Schwäbe (from Brøndby)
—	DF	GER	Luca Kilian (on loan from Mainz 05)

Out:

No.	Pos.	Nation	Player
4	DF	GER	Robert Voloder (on loan to Maribor)
6	MF	GER	Marco Höger (to Waldhof Mannheim)
7	FW	NGA	Tolu Arokodare (loan return to Valmiera)
8	DF	GER	Ismail Jakobs (to Monaco)
13	MF	GER	Max Meyer (free agent)
15	MF	GRE	Dimitrios Limnios (on loan to Twente)
16	GK	GER	Ron-Robert Zieler (loan return to Hannover 96)
20	MF	GER	Elvis Rexhbeçaj (loan return to VfL Wolfsburg)
24	MF	GER	Dominick Drexler (to Schalke 04)
31	MF	GER	Marius Wolf (loan return to Borussia Dortmund)
32	GK	GER	Julian Krahl (to Viktoria Berlin)
33	DF	BEL	Sebastiaan Bornauw (to VfL Wolfsburg)
43	FW	NGA	Emmanuel Dennis (loan return to Club Brugge)
—	DF	GER	Yann Aurel Bisseck (on loan to AGF, previously on loan at Vitória Guimarães B)
—	DF	POR	João Queirós (to Chaves)
—	DF	GER	Lasse Sobiech (to Darmstadt 98, previously on loan at Zürich)
—	MF	BEL	Birger Verstraete (to Antwerp, previously on loan)
—	MF	GER	Marcel Risse (to Viktoria Köln, previously on loan)
—	MF	FRA	Vincent Koziello (to Oostende, previously on loan at Nacional)

=== VfL Bochum ===
In:

No.	Pos.	Nation	Player
6	MF	GER	Patrick Osterhage (from Borussia Dortmund II)
10	FW	JPN	Takuma Asano (free agent)
16	DF	GRE	Kostas Stafylidis (on loan from 1899 Hoffenheim)
20	MF	GER	Elvis Rexhbeçaj (on loan from VfL Wolfsburg, previously on loan at 1. FC Köln)
21	GK	GER	Michael Esser (from Hannover 96)
22	MF	GHA	Christopher Antwi-Adjei (from SC Paderborn)
38	MF	GER	Eduard Löwen (on loan from Hertha BSC)
40	FW	GER	Sebastian Polter (from Fortuna Sittard)

Out:

No.	Pos.	Nation	Player
10	MF	GER	Thomas Eisfeld (free agent)
25	GK	GER	Patrick Drewes (to SV Sandhausen)
32	MF	AUT	Robert Žulj (to Al-Ittihad Kalba SC)
—	DF	GER	Moritz Römling (on loan to Türkgücü München, previously on loan at Wuppertaler SV)
—	MF	GER	Lars Holtkamp (to Bonner SC, previously on loan at Wuppertaler SV)

=== SpVgg Greuther Fürth ===
In:

No.	Pos.	Nation	Player
5	DF	NED	Justin Hoogma (on loan from 1899 Hoffenheim, previously on loan at Utrecht)
6	MF	GER	Adrian Fein (on loan from Bayern Munich, previously on loan at PSV)
8	MF	GER	Nils Seufert (from Arminia Bielefeld)
13	MF	GER	Max Christiansen (from Waldhof Mannheim)
15	DF	NED	Jetro Willems (from Eintracht Frankfurt)
17	FW	GER	Jessic Ngankam (on loan from Hertha BSC)
23	DF	GER	Gideon Jung (from Hamburger SV)
28	MF	TUN	Jeremy Dudziak (from Hamburger SV)

Out:

No.	Pos.	Nation	Player
5	DF	ALB	Mërgim Mavraj (to Türkgücü München)
8	MF	BIH	Marijan Ćavar (to Široki Brijeg)
15	MF	GER	Sebastian Ernst (to Hannover 96)
22	DF	GER	David Raum (to 1899 Hoffenheim)
23	DF	GER	Paul Jaeckel (to Union Berlin)
24	MF	GER	Anton Stach (to Mainz 05)
—	DF	GER	Alexander Lungwitz (to Würzburger Kickers, previously on loan at Bayern Munich II)

== 2. Bundesliga ==
=== Werder Bremen ===
In:

No.	Pos.	Nation	Player
3	DF	GER	Anthony Jung (from Brøndby)
7	FW	GER	Marvin Ducksch (from Hannover 96)
15	FW	CIV	Roger Assalé (on loan from Dijon)
23	MF	GER	Nicolai Rapp (from Union Berlin, previously on loan at Darmstadt 98)
25	DF	KOR	Kyu-hyun Park (from Ulsan Hyundai, previously on loan)
26	DF	GER	Lars Lukas Mai (on loan from Bayern Munich, previously on loan at Darmstadt 98)

Out:

No.	Pos.	Nation	Player
5	DF	SWE	Ludwig Augustinsson (to Sevilla)
7	MF	KOS	Milot Rashica (to Norwich City)
8	FW	JPN	Yuya Osako (to Vissel Kobe)
9	FW	GER	Davie Selke (loan return to Hertha BSC)
15	FW	GAM	Kebba Badjie (on loan to Hallescher FC)
18	DF	FIN	Niklas Moisander (to Malmö)
19	FW	USA	Josh Sargent (to Norwich City)
23	DF	CZE	Theodor Gebre Selassie (to Slovan Liberec)
29	MF	GER	Patrick Erras (to Holstein Kiel)
35	MF	GER	Maximilian Eggestein (to SC Freiburg)
38	GK	GER	Eduardo Haesler (on loan to Nordsjælland)
—	MF	GER	Yannik Engelhardt (on loan to SC Freiburg II)
—	MF	GER	Benjamin Goller (on loan to Darmstadt 98, previously on loan at Karlsruher SC)
—	GK	GRE	Stefanos Kapino (to Arminia Bielefeld, previously on loan at SV Sandhausen)
—	FW	GER	Johannes Eggestein (to Royal Antwerp, previously on loan at LASK)

=== FC Schalke 04 ===
In:

No.	Pos.	Nation	Player
2	DF	NED	Thomas Ouwejan (on loan from AZ, previously on loan at Udinese)
3	DF	JPN	Ko Itakura (on loan from Manchester City, previously on loan at Groningen)
4	MF	ISL	Victor Pálsson (from Darmstadt 98)
7	MF	MKD	Darko Churlinov (on loan from VfB Stuttgart)
8	MF	GER	Danny Latza (from Mainz 05)
9	FW	GER	Simon Terodde (from Hamburger SV)
10	MF	URU	Rodrigo Zalazar (on loan from Eintracht Frankfurt, previously on loan at FC St. Pauli)
11	FW	GER	Marius Bülter (from Union Berlin)
15	DF	BEL	Dries Wouters (from Genk)
21	FW	GER	Marvin Pieringer (on loan from SC Freiburg II, previously on loan at Würzburger Kickers)
24	MF	GER	Dominick Drexler (to 1. FC Köln)
27	MF	AUT	Reinhold Ranftl (from LASK)
30	GK	AUT	Martin Fraisl (from ADO Den Haag)
35	DF	POL	Marcin Kamiński (from VfB Stuttgart)
39	MF	RUS	Yaroslav Mikhailov (on loan from Zenit)

Out:

No.	Pos.	Nation	Player
2	DF	GER	Kilian Ludewig (loan return to Red Bull Salzburg)
3	DF	MAR	Hamza Mendyl (on loan to Gaziantep)
5	DF	SRB	Matija Nastasić (to Fiorentina)
6	MF	ESP	Omar Mascarell (to Elche)
7	FW	GER	Mark Uth (to 1. FC Köln)
8	MF	GER	Suat Serdar (to Hertha BSC)
9	FW	BEL	Benito Raman (to Anderlecht)
10	MF	ALG	Nabil Bentaleb (free agent)
13	DF	BRA	William (loan return to VfL Wolfsburg)
16	MF	MAR	Nassim Boujellab (on loan to FC Ingolstadt)
17	DF	FRA	Benjamin Stambouli (to Adana Demirspor)
18	FW	POR	Gonçalo Paciência (loan return to Eintracht Frankfurt)
20	DF	BIH	Sead Kolašinac (loan return to Arsenal)
21	FW	NED	Klaas-Jan Huntelaar (free agent)
22	FW	GER	Steven Skrzybski (to Holstein Kiel)
23	GK	DEN	Frederik Rønnow (loan return to Eintracht Frankfurt)
24	DF	GER	Bastian Oczipka (free agent)
28	MF	AUT	Alessandro Schöpf (to Arminia Bielefeld)
30	DF	GER	Shkodran Mustafi (free agent)
37	MF	GER	Levent Mercan (on loan to Fatih Karagümrük)
40	MF	GER	Can Bozdoğan (on loan to Beşiktaş)
—	FW	WAL	Rabbi Matondo (on loan to Cercle Brugge, previously on loan at Stoke City)
—	GK	GER	Markus Schubert (to Vitesse, previously on loan at Eintracht Frankfurt)
—	DF	GER	Jonas Carls (to SC Paderborn, previously on loan at Vitória Guimarães)
—	MF	USA	Weston McKennie (to Juventus, previously on loan)
—	MF	GER	Sebastian Rudy (to 1899 Hoffenheim, previously on loan)
—	FW	GHA	Bernard Tekpetey (to Ludogorets Razgrad, previously on loan)
—	FW	TUR	Ahmed Kutucu (to İstanbul Başakşehir, previously on loan at Heracles Almelo)

=== Holstein Kiel ===
In:

No.	Pos.	Nation	Player
4	MF	GER	Patrick Erras (from Werder Bremen)
6	MF	GER	Marcel Benger (from Borussia Mönchengladbach II)
9	FW	ISL	Hólmbert Friðjónsson (from Brescia)
10	MF	GER	Lewis Holtby (from Blackburn Rovers)
14	FW	GER	Steven Skrzybski (from Schalke 04)
20	FW	GER	Fiete Arp (on loan from Bayern Munich)
23	DF	GER	Julian Korb (free agent)

Out:

No.	Pos.	Nation	Player
7	MF	KOR	Lee Jae-sung (to Mainz 05)
20	DF	GER	Jannik Dehm (to Hannover 96)
23	FW	GER	Janni Serra (to Arminia Bielefeld)
26	MF	GER	Jonas Meffert (to Hamburger SV)
33	FW	GER	Benjamin Girth (to Eintracht Braunschweig)
35	GK	GER	Dominik Reimann (to 1. FC Magdeburg)
36	MF	GER	Niklas Hauptmann (loan return to 1. FC Köln)
—	MF	GHA	David Atanga (to Oostende, previously on loan at Admira Wacker)
—	FW	GER	Daniel Hanslik (to 1. FC Kaiserslautern, previously on loan)
—	FW	GER	Makana Baku (to Göztepe, previously on loan at Warta Poznań)
—	FW	GER	Lion Lauberbach (to Eintracht Braunschweig, previously on loan at Hansa Rostock)

=== Hamburger SV ===
In:

No.	Pos.	Nation	Player
4	DF	GER	Sebastian Schonlau (from SC Paderborn)
9	FW	GER	Robert Glatzel (from Cardiff City, previously on loan at Mainz 05)
11	FW	DEN	Mikkel Kaufmann (on loan from Copenhagen)
14	MF	NED	Ludovit Reis (from Barcelona B, previously on loan at VfL Osnabrück)
16	GK	SWE	Marko Johansson (from Malmö)
23	MF	GER	Jonas Meffert (from Holstein Kiel)
28	DF	SUI	Miro Muheim (on loan from FC St. Gallen)

Out:

No.	Pos.	Nation	Player
4	DF	NED	Rick van Drongelen (to Union Berlin)
7	DF	GER	Khaled Narey (to Fortuna Düsseldorf)
8	MF	TUN	Jeremy Dudziak (to Greuther Fürth)
9	FW	GER	Simon Terodde (to Schalke 04)
14	MF	GER	Aaron Hunt (free agent)
20	MF	ALB	Klaus Gjasula (to Darmstadt 98)
24	MF	BEL	Amadou Onana (to Lille)
26	GK	GER	Sven Ulreich (to Bayern Munich)
28	DF	GER	Gideon Jung (to Greuther Fürth)
42	MF	GER	Ogechika Heil (on loan to Go Ahead Eagles)
—	MF	GER	Aaron Opoku (on loan to VfL Osnabrück, previously on loan at Jahn Regensburg)
—	FW	ENG	Xavier Amaechi (on loan to Bolton Wanderers, previously on loan at Karlsruher SC)

=== Fortuna Düsseldorf ===
In:

No.	Pos.	Nation	Player
4	MF	JPN	Ao Tanaka (on loan from Kawasaki Frontale)
11	MF	GER	Felix Klaus (from VfL Wolfsburg, previously on loan)
16	DF	ROU	Dragoș Nedelcu (on loan from FCSB)
20	DF	GER	Khaled Narey (from Hamburger SV)
27	FW	GER	Nicklas Shipnoski (from 1. FC Saarbrücken)

Out:

No.	Pos.	Nation	Player
4	DF	AUT	Kevin Danso (loan return to FC Augsburg)
11	FW	TUR	Kenan Karaman (to Beşiktaş)
14	MF	GHA	Kelvin Ofori (to SC Paderborn)
20	MF	AUS	Brandon Borrello (loan return to SC Freiburg)
29	MF	GER	Gökhan Gül (to Gençlerbirliği)
30	GK	RUS	Anton Mitryushkin (to Dynamo Dresden)
32	DF	SVN	Luka Krajnc (loan return to Frosinone)
—	DF	GER	Jean Zimmer (to 1. FC Kaiserslautern, previously on loan)

=== Karlsruher SC ===
In:

No.	Pos.	Nation	Player
6	MF	GER	Leon Jensen (from FSV Zwickau)
16	DF	GER	Philip Heise (from Norwich City, previously on loan)
17	MF	GER	Lucas Cueto (from Viktoria Köln)
18	DF	GER	Kilian Jakob (from SC Freiburg II, previously on loan at Türkgücü München)
20	DF	GER	Felix Irorere (from Eintracht Frankfurt)
24	FW	GER	Fabian Schleusener (from 1. FC Nürnberg)
30	GK	GER	Niklas Heeger (from VfB Stuttgart II)
37	MF	GER	Fabio Kaufmann (from Eintracht Braunschweig)

Out:

No.	Pos.	Nation	Player
5	DF	GER	David Pisot (to SpVgg Unterhaching)
6	DF	AUT	Kevin Wimmer (loan return to Stoke City)
9	FW	ENG	Xavier Amaechi (loan return to Hamburger SV)
18	MF	GER	David Trivunic (to FC Nöttingen)
20	MF	GER	Alexander Groiß (to 1. FC Saarbrücken)
23	DF	LUX	Dirk Carlson (to Erzgebirge Aue)
24	FW	SEN	Babacar Guèye (to Erzgebirge Aue)
25	MF	GER	Janis Hanek (to Astoria Walldorf)
27	DF	GER	Marlon Dinger (to Astoria Walldorf II)
39	MF	GER	Benjamin Goller (loan return to Werder Bremen)
—	DF	GER	Bastian Allgeier (on loan to SSV Ulm)
—	DF	GER	Luca Bolay (on loan to 1. FC Nürnberg II)
—	FW	GER	Sven Kronemayer (on loan to Astoria Walldorf II)
—	FW	GER	Marvin Pourié (to Würzburger Kickers, previously on loan at 1. FC Kaiserslautern)

=== SV Darmstadt 98 ===
In:

No.	Pos.	Nation	Player
7	MF	GER	Benjamin Goller (on loan from Werder Bremen, previously on loan at Karlsruher SC)
9	FW	GER	Phillip Tietz (from Wehen Wiesbaden)
13	GK	GER	Morten Behrens (from 1. FC Magdeburg)
16	FW	GER	Luca Pfeiffer (on loan from Midtjylland)
17	DF	GER	Frank Ronstadt (from Würzburger Kickers)
19	DF	AUT	Emir Karic (from SCR Altach)
20	DF	GER	Jannik Müller (from DAC Dunajská Streda)
21	GK	GER	Steve Kroll (from SpVgg Unterhaching)
23	MF	ALB	Klaus Gjasula (from Hamburger SV)
24	DF	GER	Lasse Sobiech (from 1. FC Köln, previously on loan at Zürich)
43	MF	AUT	Nemanja Celic (from WSG Tirol)

Out:

No.	Pos.	Nation	Player
4	MF	ISL	Victor Pálsson (to Schalke 04)
7	FW	GER	Felix Platte (to SC Paderborn)
13	GK	GER	Carl Klaus (to 1. FC Nürnberg)
15	DF	GER	Mathias Wittek (free agent)
17	DF	GER	Lars Lukas Mai (loan return to Bayern Munich)
19	FW	TUR	Serdar Dursun (to Fenerbahçe)
20	MF	GER	Christian Clemens (free agent)
21	DF	GER	Immanuel Höhn (to SV Sandhausen)
23	MF	GER	Nicolai Rapp (loan return to Union Berlin)
28	MF	SUI	Samuele Campo (loan return to Basel)
29	FW	GER	Henry Crosthwaite (on loan to Rot-Weiß Koblenz)
31	GK	GER	Florian Stritzel (to Wehen Wiesbaden)
36	DF	GER	Silas Zehnder (to Viktoria Aschaffenburg)
37	DF	GER	Patrick Herrmann (to Weiche Flensburg)
38	MF	GER	Alexander Vogler (to SV Lippstadt)

=== 1. FC Heidenheim ===
In:

No.	Pos.	Nation	Player
4	DF	GER	Tim Siersleben (on loan from VfL Wolfsburg)
10	FW	GER	Tim Kleindienst (from Gent, previously on loan)

Out:

No.	Pos.	Nation	Player
4	DF	GER	Oliver Steurer (to MSV Duisburg)
7	MF	GER	Marc Schnatterer (to Wehen Wiesbaden)
21	MF	GER	Maximilian Thiel (to Wehen Wiesbaden)
39	GK	GER	Kevin Ibrahim (to TSV Steinbach)
40	GK	GER	Diant Ramaj (to Eintracht Frankfurt)
—	DF	GER	Jonas Brändle (to Sonnenhof Großaspach, previously on loan)
—	MF	GER	Gökalp Kılıç (to FC Memmingen, previously on loan at SSV Ulm)

=== SC Paderborn ===
In:

No.	Pos.	Nation	Player
4	DF	SUI	Jasper van der Werff (on loan from Red Bull Salzburg, previously on loan at Basel)
5	MF	GER	Marcel Mehlem (from Union St. Gilloise)
6	MF	GER	Marco Schuster (from Waldhof Mannheim)
13	DF	GER	Robin Yalçın (from Sivasspor)
14	MF	GHA	Kelvin Ofori (from Fortuna Düsseldorf)
19	FW	AUS	John Iredale (from VfL Wolfsburg II)
22	MF	GER	Marco Stiepermann (from Norwich City)
24	DF	GER	Jannis Heuer (from VfL Wolfsburg II)
27	FW	GER	Chris Führich (from Borussia Dortmund II, previously on loan)
28	DF	GER	Jonas Carls (from Schalke 04, previously on loan at Vitória Guimarães)
30	MF	GER	Luca Marseiler (from SpVgg Unterhaching)
35	MF	GER	Fabrice Hartmann (on loan from RB Leipzig)
36	FW	GER	Felix Platte (from Darmstadt 98)

Out:

No.	Pos.	Nation	Player
5	MF	COD	Chadrac Akolo (loan return to Amiens)
6	MF	BEL	Aristote Nkaka (loan return to Anderlecht)
13	DF	GER	Sebastian Schonlau (to Hamburger SV)
14	DF	SUI	Nicolas Bürgy (loan return to Young Boys)
19	FW	AUS	John Iredale (on loan to Wehen Wiesbaden)
20	MF	GER	Marco Terrazzino (to Lechia Gdańsk)
22	MF	GHA	Christopher Antwi-Adjei (to VfL Bochum)
24	MF	GER	Marcel Heller (free agent)
27	FW	GER	Chris Führich (to VfB Stuttgart)
31	MF	SWE	Svante Ingelsson (loan return to Udinese)
36	DF	ENG	Chima Okoroji (loan return to SC Freiburg)
39	MF	GRE	Sebastian Vasiliadis (to Arminia Bielefeld)
—	MF	ENG	Jayden Bennetts (to VfB Stuttgart II)
—	MF	BIH	Rifet Kapić (free agent, previously on loan at Sheriff Tiraspol)
—	MF	ENG	Antony Evans (free agent, previously on loan at Crewe Alexandra)

=== FC St. Pauli ===
In:

No.	Pos.	Nation	Player
7	MF	AUS	Jackson Irvine (from Hibernian)
8	MF	SWE	Eric Smith (from Gent, previously on loan)
18	DF	CRO	Jakov Medić (from Wehen Wiesbaden)
21	DF	GER	Lars Ritzka (from SC Verl)
22	GK	BIH	Nikola Vasilj (from Zorya Luhansk)
27	FW	TOG	Etienne Amenyido (from VfL Osnabrück)
30	MF	GER	Marcel Hartel (from Arminia Bielefeld)

Out:

No.	Pos.	Nation	Player
8	MF	URU	Rodrigo Zalazar (loan return to Eintracht Frankfurt)
12	MF	JPN	Ryo Miyaichi (to Yokohama F. Marinos)
15	DF	GER	Daniel Buballa (to Viktoria Köln)
21	GK	MKD	Dejan Stojanović (loan return to Middlesbrough)
22	FW	EGY	Omar Marmoush (loan return to VfL Wolfsburg)
24	DF	NOR	Tore Reginiussen (to Alta)
33	GK	GER	Svend Brodersen (to Yokohama)
—	DF	GER	Florian Carstens (to Wehen Wiesbaden, previously on loan)
—	MF	GER	Kevin Lankford (to Wehen Wiesbaden, previously on loan)
—	MF	GER	Maximilian Franzke (to 1. FC Magdeburg, previously on loan)
—	MF	GER	Ersin Zehir (to Antalyaspor, previously on loan at VfB Lübeck)

=== 1. FC Nürnberg ===
In:

No.	Pos.	Nation	Player
2	DF	GER	Kilian Fischer (from Türkgücü München)
6	MF	GER	Lino Tempelmann (on loan from SC Freiburg)
8	MF	GER	Taylan Duman (from Borussia Dortmund II)
16	DF	GER	Christopher Schindler (from Huddersfield Town)
19	DF	GER	Florian Hübner (from Union Berlin)
24	MF	NOR	Mats Møller Dæhli (from Genk, previously on loan)
31	GK	GER	Carl Klaus (from Darmstadt 98)
34	DF	RUS	Konstantin Rausch (free agent)

Out:

No.	Pos.	Nation	Player
13	DF	GER	Pius Krätschmer (to 1. FC Saarbrücken)
17	MF	GER	Robin Hack (to Holstein Kiel)
18	MF	GER	Hanno Behrens (to Hansa Rostock)
21	DF	GER	Kevin Goden (to 1860 Munich)
23	FW	GER	Fabian Schleusener (to Karlsruher SC)
25	DF	GER	Oliver Sorg (free agent)
28	DF	GER	Lukas Mühl (to Austria Wien)
29	GK	GER	Christian Früchtl (loan return to Bayern Munich)
30	GK	AUT	Andreas Lukse (to First Vienna)
33	DF	AUT	Georg Margreitter (to Grasshoppers)
—	MF	POR	Iuri Medeiros (to Braga, previously on loan)
—	FW	POL	Dominik Steczyk (to Piast Gliwice, previously on loan)

=== Erzgebirge Aue ===
In:

No.	Pos.	Nation	Player
3	DF	LUX	Dirk Carlson (from Karlsruher SC)
11	FW	GER	Nicolas-Gerrit Kühn (on loan from Bayern Munich II)
18	MF	GER	Soufiane Messeguem (from VfL Wolfsburg II)
19	MF	MNE	Omar Sijarić (from Türkgücü München)
22	FW	SEN	Babacar Guèye (from Karlsruher SC)
23	DF	GER	Anthony Barylla (from 1. FC Saarbrücken)
30	MF	GER	Sam Schreck (on loan from Groningen)
34	GK	LUX	Tim Kips (from F91 Dudelange)
37	FW	CRO	Antonio Mance (on loan from Osijek, previously on loan at Puskás Akadémia)
40	DF	TUN	Ramzi Ferjani (from Nitra)

Out:

No.	Pos.	Nation	Player
4	DF	GER	Fabian Kalig (free agent)
11	FW	GER	Florian Krüger (to Arminia Bielefeld)
12	DF	GER	Steve Breitkreuz (to Jahn Regensburg)
13	MF	GER	Louis Samson (to Hallescher FC)
20	DF	GER	Calogero Rizzuto (to Hansa Rostock)
22	DF	GER	Niklas Jeck (on loan to Union Titus Pétange)
34	GK	KOR	Kevin Harr (free agent)
37	FW	GER	Pascal Testroet (to SV Sandhausen)
40	GK	GER	Jean-Marie Plath (to Union Fürstenwalde)

=== Hannover 96 ===
In:

No.	Pos.	Nation	Player
6	MF	GER	Tom Trybull (from Norwich City, previously on loan at Blackburn Rovers)
10	MF	GER	Sebastian Ernst (from Greuther Fürth)
14	FW	GER	Maximilian Beier (on loan from 1899 Hoffenheim)
22	FW	GER	Sebastian Stolze (from Jahn Regensburg)
23	DF	SVN	Luka Krajnc (from Frosinone, previously on loan at Fortuna Düsseldorf)
25	DF	GER	Jannik Dehm (from Holstein Kiel)
29	MF	CMR	Gaël Ondoua (from Servette)
31	DF	GER	Julian Börner (from Sheffield Wednesday)
37	MF	GER	Sebastian Kerk (from VfL Osnabrück)

Out:

No.	Pos.	Nation	Player
2	DF	CRO	Josip Elez (to Hajduk Split)
5	DF	GUI	Simon Falette (to Hatayspor)
6	MF	SVN	Jaka Bijol (loan return to CSKA Moscow)
10	MF	JPN	Genki Haraguchi (to Union Berlin)
15	DF	GER	Timo Hübers (to 1. FC Köln)
17	FW	GER	Marvin Ducksch (to Werder Bremen)
22	GK	GER	Michael Ratajczak (retired)
23	DF	TUR	Barış Başdaş (to Samsunspor)
27	MF	GER	Kingsley Schindler (loan return to 1. FC Köln)
29	MF	GER	Simon Stehle (on loan to 1. FC Kaiserslautern)
31	GK	GER	Michael Esser (to VfL Bochum)
34	MF	GER	Niklas Tarnat (free agent)
40	MF	USA	McKinze Gaines (free agent)

=== Jahn Regensburg ===
In:

No.	Pos.	Nation	Player
8	FW	GER	Aygün Yıldırım (from SC Verl)
11	MF	GER	Konrad Faber (from SC Freiburg II)
15	MF	NZL	Sarpreet Singh (on loan from Bayern Munich II)
20	DF	GAM	Leon Guwara (from Utrecht, previously on loan at VVV-Venlo)
21	GK	GER	Thorsten Kirschbaum (from VVV-Venlo)
22	MF	GER	Carlo Boukhalfa (on loan from SC Freiburg)
23	DF	GER	Steve Breitkreuz (from Erzgebirge Aue)
27	FW	NED	Joël Zwarts (from Excelsior)

Out:

No.	Pos.	Nation	Player
8	MF	KOS	Albion Vrenezi (to Türkgücü München)
11	MF	GER	Florian Heister (to Viktoria Köln)
17	MF	GER	Oliver Hein (retired)
21	FW	GER	Jan-Marc Schneider (to PAS Giannina)
23	MF	GER	Nicolas Wähling (to SSV Ulm)
22	MF	GER	Sebastian Stolze (to Hannover 96)
27	MF	GER	Aaron Opoku (loan return to Hamburger SV)
31	DF	GER	Tom Baack (on loan to SC Verl)
32	GK	GER	Alexander Weidinger (on loan to SpVgg Unterhaching)
—	FW	GER	Federico Palacios (to Viktoria Köln, previously on loan at MSV Duisburg)

=== SV Sandhausen ===
In:

No.	Pos.	Nation	Player
1	GK	GER	Patrick Drewes (from VfL Bochum)
5	MF	GER	Carlo Sickinger (from 1. FC Kaiserslautern)
7	MF	BEN	Cebio Soukou (from Arminia Bielefeld)
8	MF	GER	Christian Kinsombi (from KFC Uerdingen)
11	MF	GER	Gianluca Gaudino (from Young Boys)
15	DF	GER	Immanuel Höhn (from Darmstadt 98)
19	DF	KOS	Bashkim Ajdini (from VfL Osnabrück)
22	MF	AUT	Marcel Ritzmaier (from Barnsley, previously on loan at Rapid Wien)
23	MF	GER	Christian Conteh (on loan from Feyenoord)
25	DF	SEN	Oumar Diakhité (from Eintracht Braunschweig)
27	DF	GER	Arne Sicker (from MSV Duisburg)
35	FW	CUW	Charlison Benschop (from Apollon Limassol)
36	DF	ENG	Chima Okoroji (from SC Freiburg, previously on loan at SC Paderborn)
37	FW	GER	Pascal Testroet (from Erzgebirge Aue)

Out:

No.	Pos.	Nation	Player
1	GK	GRE	Stefanos Kapino (loan return to Werder Bremen)
3	DF	GER	Diego Contento (free agent)
6	MF	GER	Denis Linsmayer (to FC Ingolstadt)
7	MF	GRE	Nikos Zografakis (to Energie Cottbus)
15	GK	GER	Philipp Heerwagen (free agent)
18	FW	GER	Kevin Behrens (to Union Berlin)
19	MF	DEN	Nikolas Nartey (loan return to VfB Stuttgart)
20	MF	GER	Emanuel Taffertshofer (to Wehen Wiesbaden)
21	MF	VEN	Enrique Peña Zauner (to Eintracht Braunschweig)
22	DF	GER	Gerrit Nauber (to Go Ahead Eagles)
23	DF	GER	Nils Röseler (to FC Ingolstadt)
24	DF	GER	Philipp Klingmann (retired)
26	MF	KOS	Besar Halimi (to Riga)
27	MF	GER	Robin Scheu (to 1. FC Saarbrücken)
29	MF	CRO	Ivan Paurević (to Riga)
30	DF	GER	Sören Dieckmann (to Fortuna Köln)
32	FW	GER	Patrick Schmidt (loan return to 1. FC Heidenheim)
33	DF	GER	Alexander Rossipal (to Waldhof Mannheim)

=== Dynamo Dresden ===
In:

No.	Pos.	Nation	Player
2	DF	GEO	Guram Giorbelidze (on loan from Wolfsberger AC)
3	DF	GER	Michael Akoto (from Mainz 05 II)
17	MF	GER	Morris Schröter (from FSV Zwickau)
19	MF	GER	Luca Herrmann (from SC Freiburg II)
20	MF	KOR	Seo Jong-min (from Eintracht Frankfurt youth)
21	DF	AUT	Michael Sollbauer (from Barnsley)
22	GK	RUS	Anton Mitryushkin (from Fortuna Düsseldorf)
23	DF	GER	Antonis Aidonis (on loan from VfB Stuttgart)
25	MF	AUS	Brandon Borrello (from SC Freiburg, previously on loan at Fortuna Düsseldorf)
30	MF	GER	Julius Kade (from Union Berlin)

Out:

No.	Pos.	Nation	Player
3	DF	GER	Leroy Kwadwo (to MSV Duisburg)
6	DF	GER	Marco Hartmann (free agent)
13	MF	GER	Marvin Stefaniak (loan return to VfL Wolfsburg)
17	MF	GER	Maximilian Großer (to Hamburger SV II)
19	DF	GER	Jonathan Meier (loan return to Mainz 05)
20	MF	GER	Julius Kade (to Union Berlin)
22	DF	GER	Niklas Kreuzer (to Hallescher FC)
23	GK	GER	Stefan Kiefer (free agent)
27	DF	GER	Jonas Kühn (on loan to Sonnenhof Großaspach)
29	FW	GER	Phill Harres (on loan to SSV Ulm)
37	FW	SVN	Luka Štor (on loan to Apollon Limassol)
—	FW	CZE	Vasil Kušej (to Prostějov, previously on loan at Ústí nad Labem)

=== Hansa Rostock ===
In:

No.	Pos.	Nation	Player
9	FW	SUI	Ridge Munsy (from Würzburger Kickers)
11	FW	GER	Streli Mamba (on loan from Kairat)
13	FW	GER	Kevin Schumacher (from TSV Havelse)
14	MF	SWE	Svante Ingelsson (from Udinese, previously on loan at SC Paderborn)
16	DF	USA	Ryan Malone (from VfB Lübeck)
17	MF	GER	Hanno Behrens (from 1. FC Nürnberg)
23	DF	GER	Jonathan Meier (on loan from Mainz 05, previously on loan at Dynamo Dresden)
25	DF	GER	Thomas Meißner (from Puskás Akadémia)
27	DF	GER	Calogero Rizzuto (from Erzgebirge Aue)

Out:

No.	Pos.	Nation	Player
9	FW	GER	Erik Engelhardt (to Energie Cottbus)
10	MF	GER	Korbinian Vollmann (free agent)
11	MF	GER	Aaron Herzog (to Hallescher FC)
14	DF	ITA	Max Reinthaler (to FSV Zwickau)
15	FW	GER	Lion Lauberbach (loan return to Holstein Kiel)
16	DF	GER	Nils Butzen (to FSV Zwickau)
23	DF	GER	Sven Sonnenberg (to Heracles Almelo)
25	MF	GER	Oliver Daedlow (on loan to TSV Havelse)
26	MF	GER	Philip Türpitz (to Türkgücü München)
27	MF	GER	Luca Horn (on loan to FSV Zwickau)
29	FW	GER	Gian Luca Schulz (on loan to Energie Cottbus)
—	DF	GER	Paul Wiese (to Virginia Cavaliers, previously on loan at Bonner SC)

=== FC Ingolstadt 04 ===
In:

No.	Pos.	Nation	Player
2	DF	DEN	Andreas Poulsen (on loan from Borussia Mönchengladbach, previously on loan at Austria Wien)
8	MF	MAR	Nassim Boujellab (on loan from Schalke 04)
13	DF	GER	Nils Röseler (from SV Sandhausen)
23	MF	GER	Denis Linsmayer (from SV Sandhausen)
26	DF	GER	Jan-Hendrik Marx (from Waldhof Mannheim)
28	MF	FRA	Yassin Ben Balla (from Eintracht Braunschweig)
—	FW	AUT	Christian Gebauer (on loan from Arminia Bielefeld)

Out:

No.	Pos.	Nation	Player
4	DF	DEN	Bjørn Paulsen (to Hammarby)
13	FW	BRA	Caiuby (free agent)
18	DF	GER	Gordon Büch (to Racing FC)
22	MF	FIN	Ilmari Niskanen (to Dundee United)
23	MF	GER	Robin Krauße (to Eintracht Braunschweig)
—	MF	GER	Maximilian Wolfram (to Carl Zeiss Jena, previously on loan at FSV Zwickau)

== See also ==
- 2021–22 Bundesliga
- 2021–22 2. Bundesliga
