= List of German football transfers summer 2022 =

This is a list of German football transfers in the summer transfer window 2022 by club. Only transfers of the Bundesliga, and 2. Bundesliga are included.

== Bundesliga ==
Note: Flags indicate national team as has been defined under FIFA eligibility rules. Players may hold more than one non-FIFA nationality.

=== FC Bayern Munich ===
In:

No.	Pos.	Nation	Player
17	FW	SEN	Sadio Mané (from Liverpool)
38	MF	NED	Ryan Gravenberch (from Ajax)
40	DF	MAR	Noussair Mazraoui (from Ajax)

Out:

No.	Pos.	Nation	Player
3	DF	ENG	Omar Richards (to Nottingham Forest)
4	DF	GER	Niklas Süle (to Borussia Dortmund)
9	FW	POL	Robert Lewandowski (to Barcelona)
22	MF	ESP	Marc Roca (to Leeds United)
24	MF	FRA	Corentin Tolisso (to Lyon)
36	GK	GER	Christian Früchtl (to Austria Wien)
—	GK	GER	Ron-Thorben Hoffmann (to Eintracht Braunschweig, previously on loan at Sunderland)
—	DF	GER	Lars Lukas Mai (to Lugano, previously on loan at Werder Bremen)

=== Borussia Dortmund ===
In:

No.	Pos.	Nation	Player
4	DF	GER	Nico Schlotterbeck (from SC Freiburg)
6	MF	TUR	Salih Özcan (from 1. FC Köln)
9	FW	CIV	Sébastien Haller (from Ajax)
25	DF	GER	Niklas Süle (from Bayern Munich)
27	FW	GER	Karim Adeyemi (from Red Bull Salzburg)
33	GK	GER	Alexander Meyer (from Jahn Regensburg)
35	GK	POL	Marcel Lotka (from Hertha BSC)

Out:

No.	Pos.	Nation	Player
5	DF	FRA	Dan-Axel Zagadou (free agent)
9	FW	NOR	Erling Haaland (to Manchester City)
20	MF	BRA	Reinier (loan return to Real Madrid)
27	FW	GER	Steffen Tigges (to 1. FC Köln)
28	MF	BEL	Axel Witsel (to Atlético Madrid)
29	DF	GER	Marcel Schmelzer (retired)
34	DF	CRO	Marin Pongračić (loan return to VfL Wolfsburg)
35	GK	SUI	Marwin Hitz (to FC Basel)
38	GK	SUI	Roman Bürki (to St. Louis City)

=== Bayer Leverkusen ===
In:

No.	Pos.	Nation	Player
23	FW	CZE	Adam Hložek (from Sparta Prague)

Out:

No.	Pos.	Nation	Player
13	FW	ARG	Lucas Alario (to Eintracht Frankfurt)
15	MF	AUT	Julian Baumgartlinger (free agent)
21	GK	GER	Lennart Grill (on loan to Union Berlin)
39	DF	TOG	Sadik Fofana (on loan to 1. FC Nürnberg)

=== RB Leipzig ===
In:

No.	Pos.	Nation	Player
21	GK	GER	Janis Blaswich (from Heracles Almelo)
24	MF	AUT	Xaver Schlager (from VfL Wolfsburg)

Out:

No.	Pos.	Nation	Player
13	GK	GER	Philipp Tschauner (retired)
14	MF	USA	Tyler Adams (to Leeds United)
31	GK	ESP	Josep Martínez (on loan to Genoa)
37	MF	GER	Sidney Raebiger (to Greuther Fürth)
45	MF	GER	Mehmet Ibrahimi (on loan to Eintracht Braunschweig)
46	MF	GER	Ben Klefisch (on loan to Viktoria Köln)
—	GK	GER	Tim Schreiber (on loan to Holstein Kiel, previously on loan at Hallescher FC)
—	DF	GER	Frederik Jäkel (on loan to Arminia Bielefeld, previously on loan at Oostende)
—	MF	GER	Tom Krauß (on loan to Schalke 04, previously on loan at 1. FC Nürnberg)
—	FW	GER	Dennis Borkowski (on loan to Dynamo Dresden, previously on loan at 1. FC Nürnberg)
—	GK	SUI	Yvon Mvogo (to Lorient, previously on loan at PSV)
—	MF	GER	Eric Martel (to 1. FC Köln, previously on loan at Austria Wien)
—	FW	KOR	Hwang Hee-chan (to Wolverhampton Wanderers, previously on loan)

=== Union Berlin ===
In:

No.	Pos.	Nation	Player
5	DF	NED	Danilho Doekhi (from Vitesse)
14	MF	GER	Paul Seguin (from Greuther Fürth)
19	MF	GER	Janik Haberer (from SC Freiburg)
21	MF	GER	Tim Skarke (from Darmstadt 98)
32	MF	SRB	Miloš Pantović (from VfL Bochum)
37	GK	GER	Lennart Grill (on loan from Bayer Leverkusen)
38	FW	USA	Jordan Siebatcheu (from Young Boys)
40	FW	GER	Jamie Leweling (from Greuther Fürth)

Out:

No.	Pos.	Nation	Player
1	GK	GER	Andreas Luthe (to 1. FC Kaiserslautern)
11	FW	NGR	Anthony Ujah (free agent)
14	FW	NGR	Taiwo Awoniyi (to Nottingham Forest)
20	DF	GER	Bastian Oczipka (free agent)
21	MF	GER	Grischa Prömel (to 1899 Hoffenheim)
39	FW	GER	Suleiman Abdullahi (to Göteborg)
—	GK	GER	Lennart Moser (to Eupen, previously on loan at Austria Klagenfurt)
—	MF	POL	Paweł Wszołek (to Legia Warsaw, previously on loan)
—	FW	GER	Leon Dajaku (to Sunderland, previously on loan)
—	FW	DEN	Marcus Ingvartsen (to Mainz 05, previously on loan)

=== SC Freiburg ===
In:

No.	Pos.	Nation	Player
11	MF	GHA	Daniel-Kofi Kyereh (from FC St. Pauli)
28	DF	GER	Matthias Ginter (from Borussia Mönchengladbach)
38	FW	AUT	Michael Gregoritsch (from FC Augsburg)
42	MF	JPN	Ritsu Dōan (from PSV)

Out:

No.	Pos.	Nation	Player
4	DF	GER	Nico Schlotterbeck (to Borussia Dortmund)
11	FW	BIH	Ermedin Demirović (to FC Augsburg)
19	MF	GER	Janik Haberer (to Union Berlin)
—	GK	GER	Niclas Thiede (to SC Verl, previously on loan)
—	DF	GER	Gian-Luca Itter (to Greuther Fürth, previously on loan)
—	MF	GER	Carlo Boukhalfa (to FC St. Pauli, previously on loan at Jahn Regensburg)
—	FW	GER	Marvin Pieringer (to Schalke 04, previously on loan)

=== 1. FC Köln ===
In:

No.	Pos.	Nation	Player
3	DF	DEN	Kristian Pedersen (from Birmingham City)
6	MF	GER	Eric Martel (from RB Leipzig, previously on loan at Austria Wien)
8	MF	GER	Denis Huseinbasic (from Kickers Offenbach)
15	DF	GER	Luca Kilian (from Mainz 05, previously on loan)
21	FW	GER	Steffen Tigges (from Borussia Dortmund)
23	FW	ARM	Sargis Adamyan (from 1899 Hoffenheim, previously on loan at Club Brugge)
37	MF	GER	Linton Maina (from Hannover 96)

Out:

No.	Pos.	Nation	Player
6	MF	TUR	Salih Özcan (to Borussia Dortmund)
21	MF	AUT	Louis Schaub (to Hannover 96)
23	DF	GER	Jannes Horn (to VfL Bochum)
30	FW	GER	Marvin Obuz (on loan to Holstein Kiel)
31	MF	CZE	Tomáš Ostrák (to St. Louis City)
—	DF	GER	Yann Aurel Bisseck (to AGF, previously on loan)

=== Mainz 05 ===
In:

No.	Pos.	Nation	Player
4	MF	MAR	Aymen Barkok (from Eintracht Frankfurt)
5	DF	GER	Maxim Leitsch (from VfL Bochum)
10	MF	FRA	Angelo Fulgini (from Angers)
11	FW	DEN	Marcus Ingvartsen (from Union Berlin, previously on loan)
17	DF	FRA	Anthony Caci (from Strasbourg)
21	DF	GER	Danny da Costa (from Eintracht Frankfurt)
31	MF	GER	Dominik Kohr (from Eintracht Frankfurt, previously on loan)
37	FW	NED	Delano Burgzorg (from Heracles Almelo, previously on loan)

Out:

No.	Pos.	Nation	Player
4	DF	NED	Jerry St. Juste (to Sporting CP)
5	MF	NED	Jean-Paul Boëtius (free agent)
18	DF	GER	Daniel Brosinski (free agent)
19	DF	FRA	Moussa Niakhaté (to Nottingham Forest)
22	MF	AUT	Kevin Stöger (to VfL Bochum)
26	MF	GER	Paul Nebel (on loan to Karlsruher SC)
34	DF	AUT	David Nemeth (to FC St. Pauli)
—	DF	GER	Luca Kilian (to 1. FC Köln, previously on loan)
—	DF	GER	Jonathan Meier (to Dynamo Dresden, previously on loan at Hansa Rostock)
—	DF	BEL	Dimitri Lavalée (to Mechelen, previously on loan at Sint-Truiden)

=== 1899 Hoffenheim ===
In:

No.	Pos.	Nation	Player
6	MF	GER	Grischa Prömel (from Union Berlin)
20	MF	GER	Finn Ole Becker (from FC St. Pauli)

Out:

No.	Pos.	Nation	Player
6	DF	NOR	Håvard Nordtveit (free agent)
11	MF	AUT	Florian Grillitsch (free agent)
28	DF	USA	Chris Richards (loan return to Bayern Munich)
—	DF	GRE	Kostas Stafylidis (to VfL Bochum, previously on loan)
—	MF	SRB	Mijat Gaćinović (to AEK Athens, previously on loan at Panathinaikos)
—	FW	BRA	Klauss (to St. Louis City, previously on loan at Sint-Truiden)
—	FW	ARM	Sargis Adamyan (to 1. FC Köln, previously on loan at Club Brugge)
—	FW	GER	David Otto (to FC St. Pauli, previously on loan at Jahn Regensburg)

=== Borussia Mönchengladbach ===
In:

No.	Pos.	Nation	Player
3	DF	JPN	Ko Itakura (from Manchester City, previously on loan at Schalke 04)
22	MF	DEN	Oscar Fraulo (from Midtjylland)

Out:

No.	Pos.	Nation	Player
22	MF	SVK	László Bénes (to Hamburger SV)
28	DF	GER	Matthias Ginter (to SC Freiburg)
37	FW	ENG	Keanan Bennetts (free agent)
46	GK	GER	Jonas Kersken (on loan to SV Meppen)
—	DF	DEN	Andreas Poulsen (to AaB, previously on loan at FC Ingolstadt)

=== Eintracht Frankfurt ===
In:

No.	Pos.	Nation	Player
4	DF	CMR	Jérôme Onguéné (from Red Bull Salzburg)
5	DF	CRO	Hrvoje Smolčić (from Rijeka)
6	MF	CRO	Kristijan Jakić (from Dinamo Zagreb, previously on loan)
9	FW	FRA	Randal Kolo Muani (from Nantes)
11	FW	GER	Faride Alidou (from Hamburger SV)
21	FW	ARG	Lucas Alario (from Bayer Leverkusen)
23	MF	NOR	Jens Petter Hauge (from Milan, previously on loan)
24	DF	POR	Aurélio Buta (from Royal Antwerp)
27	MF	GER	Mario Götze (from PSV)
28	MF	GER	Marcel Wenig (from Bayern Munich Academy)

Out:

No.	Pos.	Nation	Player
3	DF	AUT	Stefan Ilsanker (to Genoa)
9	FW	NED	Sam Lammers (loan return to Atalanta)
13	DF	AUT	Martin Hinteregger (retired)
21	FW	GER	Ragnar Ache (on loan to Greuther Fürth)
24	DF	GER	Danny da Costa (to Mainz 05)
27	MF	MAR	Aymen Barkok (to Mainz 05)
37	DF	GER	Erik Durm (to 1. FC Kaiserslautern)
46	MF	CYP	Antonio Foti (on loan to Hannover 96)
—	GK	GER	Elias Bördner (to Viktoria Köln, previously on loan)
—	MF	GER	Dominik Kohr (to Mainz 05, previously on loan)
—	MF	URU	Rodrigo Zalazar (to Schalke 04, previously on loan)
—	MF	SUI	Steven Zuber (to AEK Athens, previously on loan)
—	MF	SLO	Martin Pečar (to Austria Wien, previously on loan)

=== VfL Wolfsburg ===
In:

No.	Pos.	Nation	Player
2	DF	GER	Kilian Fischer (from 1. FC Nürnberg)
16	FW	POL	Jakub Kamiński (from Lech Poznań)
38	MF	CRO	Bartol Franjić (from Dinamo Zagreb)
39	MF	AUT	Patrick Wimmer (from Arminia Bielefeld)

Out:

No.	Pos.	Nation	Player
2	DF	BRA	William (free agent)
24	MF	AUT	Xaver Schlager (to RB Leipzig)
25	DF	USA	John Brooks (free agent)
28	FW	BEL	Dodi Lukebakio (loan return to Hertha BSC)
—	MF	KOR	Hong Yun-sang (on loan to 1. FC Nürnberg II, previously on loan at St. Pölten)

=== VfL Bochum ===
In:

No.	Pos.	Nation	Player
5	MF	POL	Jacek Góralski (from Kairat Almaty)
7	MF	AUT	Kevin Stöger (from Mainz 05)
10	MF	GER	Philipp Förster (from VfB Stuttgart)
16	DF	GRE	Kostas Stafylidis (from 1899 Hoffenheim, previously on loan)
18	DF	ENG	Jordi Osei-Tutu (from Arsenal, previously on loan at Rotherham United)
20	DF	UKR	Ivan Ordets (on loan from Dynamo Moscow)
23	DF	GAM	Saidy Janko (on loan from Real Valladolid)
33	FW	GER	Philipp Hofmann (from Karlsruher SC)
35	FW	CGO	Silvère Ganvoula (loan return from Cercle Brugge)
38	DF	GER	Jannes Horn (from 1. FC Köln)

Out:

No.	Pos.	Nation	Player
5	DF	SUI	Saulo Decarli (to Eintracht Braunschweig)
7	FW	GER	Danny Blum (to APOEL FC)
11	DF	UGA	Herbert Bockhorn (free agent)
14	MF	GER	Tom Weilandt (to Greifswalder FC)
19	FW	NED	Jürgen Locadia (to Persepolis)
20	MF	GER	Elvis Rexhbeçaj (loan return to VfL Wolfsburg)
23	MF	GER	Robert Tesche (to VfL Osnabrück)
27	MF	SRB	Miloš Pantović (to Union Berlin)
28	FW	GER	Luis Hartwig (on loan to SKN St. Pölten)
29	DF	GER	Maxim Leitsch (to Mainz 05)
30	DF	GER	Moritz Römling (on loan to Rot-Weiss Essen, previously on loan at Türkgücü München)
37	DF	GER	Armel Bella-Kotchap (to Southampton)
38	MF	GER	Eduard Löwen (loan return to Hertha BSC)
40	FW	GER	Sebastian Polter (to Schalke 04)

=== FC Augsburg ===
In:

No.	Pos.	Nation	Player
9	FW	BIH	Ermedin Demirović (from SC Freiburg)
10	MF	GER	Arne Maier (from Hertha BSC, previously on loan)
23	DF	GER	Maximilian Bauer (from Greuther Fürth)

Out:

No.	Pos.	Nation	Player
11	FW	AUT	Michael Gregoritsch (to SC Freiburg)
14	MF	CZE	Jan Morávek (free agent)
21	FW	SUI	Andi Zeqiri (loan return to Brighton & Hove Albion)
27	FW	ISL	Alfreð Finnbogason (free agent)
41	MF	GER	Tim Civeja (on loan to FC Ingolstadt)
—	DF	CRO	Jozo Stanić (on loan to Varaždin, previously on loan at Wehen Wiesbaden)

=== VfB Stuttgart ===
In:

No.	Pos.	Nation	Player
4	DF	GER	Josha Vagnoman (from Hamburger SV)
5	DF	GRE	Konstantinos Mavropanos (from Arsenal, previously on loan)
11	FW	COL	Juan José Perea (from PAS Giannina)
21	DF	JPN	Hiroki Ito (from Júbilo Iwata, previously on loan)

Out:

No.	Pos.	Nation	Player
10	MF	GER	Daniel Didavi (free agent)
11	MF	GER	Erik Thommy (to Sporting Kansas City)
17	FW	EGY	Omar Marmoush (loan return to VfL Wolfsburg)
20	MF	GER	Philipp Förster (to VfL Bochum)
50	FW	FRA	Alexis Tibidi (on loan to SCR Altach)
—	DF	ESP	Pablo Maffeo (to Mallorca, previously on loan)

=== Hertha BSC ===
In:

No.	Pos.	Nation	Player
5	DF	CRO	Filip Uremović (from Rubin Kazan, previously on loan at Sheffield United)
16	DF	ENG	Jonjoe Kenny (from Everton)
34	MF	CRO	Ivan Šunjić (on loan from Birmingham City)
—	FW	NGR	Chidera Ejuke (on loan from CSKA Moscow)

Out:

No.	Pos.	Nation	Player
1	GK	GER	Alexander Schwolow (on loan to Schalke 04)
5	DF	GER	Niklas Stark (to Werder Bremen)
12	GK	GER	Nils Körber (to Hansa Rostock)
13	MF	GER	Lukas Klünter (free agent)
14	FW	ALG	Ishak Belfodil (free agent)
37	GK	POL	Marcel Lotka (to Borussia Dortmund)
46	FW	GER	Anton Kade (to Basel)
—	MF	GER	Arne Maier (to FC Augsburg, previously on loan)
—	MF	GER	Eduard Löwen (to St. Louis City, previously on loan at VfL Bochum)
—	MF	NED	Javairô Dilrosun (to Feyenoord, previously on loan at Bordeaux)
—	FW	NED	Daishawn Redan (on loan to Utrecht, previously on loan at PEC Zwolle)

=== Schalke 04 ===
In:

No.	Pos.	Nation	Player
2	DF	NED	Thomas Ouwejan (from AZ, previously on loan)
3	DF	AUT	Leo Greiml (from Rapid Wien)
6	MF	GER	Tom Krauß (on loan from RB Leipzig, previously on loan at 1. FC Nürnberg)
10	MF	URU	Rodrigo Zalazar (from Eintracht Frankfurt, previously on loan)
13	GK	GER	Alexander Schwolow (on loan from Hertha BSC)
20	MF	FRA	Florent Mollet (from Montpellier)
21	FW	GER	Marvin Pieringer (from SC Freiburg, previously on loan)
22	DF	MLI	Ibrahima Cissé (from Gent)
27	DF	SUI	Cédric Brunner (from Arminia Bielefeld)
28	GK	GER	Justin Heekeren (from Rot-Weiß Oberhausen)
29	MF	GER	Tobias Mohr (from 1. FC Heidenheim)
39	DF	JPN	Maya Yoshida (from Sampdoria)
40	FW	GER	Sebastian Polter (from VfL Bochum)

Out:

No.	Pos.	Nation	Player
3	DF	JPN	Ko Itakura (loan return to Manchester City)
7	MF	MKD	Darko Churlinov (loan return to VfB Stuttgart)
16	DF	NOR	Andreas Vindheim (loan return to Sparta Prague)
18	MF	GER	Marc Rzatkowski (to Arminia Bielefeld)
26	DF	SEN	Salif Sané (free agent)
27	DF	AUT	Reinhold Ranftl (on loan to Austria Wien)
30	GK	AUT	Martin Fraisl (free agent)
39	MF	RUS	Yaroslav Mikhaylov (loan return to Zenit)
—	MF	MAR	Nassim Boujellab (on loan to HJK Helsinki, previously on loan at FC Ingolstadt)
—	DF	GER	Timo Becker (to Holstein Kiel, previously on loan at Hansa Rostock)
—	DF	MAR	Hamza Mendyl (to OH Leuven, previously on loan at Gaziantep)
—	MF	GER	Levent Mercan (to Fatih Karagümrük, previously on loan)
—	FW	WAL	Rabbi Matondo (to Rangers, previously on loan at Cercle Brugge)

=== Werder Bremen ===
In:

No.	Pos.	Nation	Player
4	DF	GER	Niklas Stark (from Hertha BSC)
5	DF	GER	Amos Pieper (from Arminia Bielefeld)
6	MF	DEN	Jens Stage (from Copenhagen)
9	FW	SCO	Oliver Burke (from Sheffield United, previously on loan at Millwall)
19	MF	TOG	Dikeni Salifou (from FC Augsburg youth)
26	DF	ENG	Lee Buchanan (from Derby County)

Out:

No.	Pos.	Nation	Player
15	FW	CIV	Roger Assalé (loan return to Dijon)
16	MF	GER	Oscar Schönfelder (on loan to Jahn Regensburg)
21	DF	TUR	Ömer Toprak (to Antalyaspor)
25	DF	KOR	Kyu-hyun Park (on loan to Dynamo Dresden)
26	DF	GER	Lars Lukas Mai (loan return to Bayern Munich)
31	DF	ITA	Simon Straudi (to Austria Klagenfurt)
40	GK	GER	Luca Plogmann (free agent)
—	DF	POL	Maik Nawrocki (to Legia Warsaw, previously on loan)
—	MF	GER	Jan-Niklas Beste (to 1. FC Heidenheim, previously on loan at Jahn Regensburg)
—	FW	GAM	Kebba Badjie (to VfB Oldenburg, previously on loan at Hallescher FC)

== 2. Bundesliga ==
=== Arminia Bielefeld ===
In:

No.	Pos.	Nation	Player
4	DF	GER	Frederik Jäkel (on loan from RB Leipzig, previously on loan at Oostende)
6	DF	GER	Oliver Hüsing (from 1. FC Heidenheim)
16	MF	GER	Marc Rzatkowski (from Schalke 04)
22	DF	SUI	Silvan Sidler (from Luzern)
30	DF	PAN	Andrés Andrade (from LASK, previously on loan)
37	MF	AUT	Benjamin Kanuric (from Rapid Wien)

Out:

No.	Pos.	Nation	Player
1	GK	GER	Stefan Ortega (to Manchester City)
2	DF	GER	Amos Pieper (to Werder Bremen)
4	DF	SWE	Joakim Nilsson (to St. Louis City)
7	MF	GER	Gonzalo Castro (free agent)
8	MF	AUT	Alessandro Schöpf (free agent)
16	MF	GER	Fabian Kunze (to Hannover 96)
20	MF	AUT	Patrick Wimmer (to VfL Wolfsburg)
27	DF	SUI	Cédric Brunner (to Schalke 04)
—	DF	NED	Mike van der Hoorn (to Utrecht, previously on loan)
—	FW	GER	Sebastian Müller (on loan to Hallescher FC, previously on loan at Eintracht Braunschweig)

=== Greuther Fürth ===
In:

No.	Pos.	Nation	Player
3	DF	GER	Oualid Mhamdi (from Viktoria Köln)
5	DF	TUN	Oussama Haddadi (free agent)
6	MF	GER	Sidney Raebiger (from RB Leipzig)
17	MF	JPN	Lucien Littbarski (from VfL Wolfsburg youth)
27	DF	GER	Gian-Luca Itter (from SC Freiburg, previously on loan)
30	FW	GER	Armindo Sieb (from Bayern Munich II)
39	FW	GER	Ragnar Ache (on loan from Eintracht Frankfurt)

Out:

No.	Pos.	Nation	Player
1	GK	GER	Marius Funk (to FC Ingolstadt)
4	DF	GER	Maximilian Bauer (to FC Augsburg)
16	FW	NOR	Håvard Nielsen (to Hannover 96)
17	FW	GER	Jessic Ngankam (loan return to Hertha BSC)
24	DF	NED	Nick Viergever (to Utrecht)
30	GK	GER	Sascha Burchert (free agent)
32	DF	FRA	Abdourahmane Barry (to Amiens)
33	MF	GER	Paul Seguin (to Union Berlin)
40	FW	GER	Jamie Leweling (to Union Berlin)

=== Hamburger SV ===
In:

No.	Pos.	Nation	Player
7	FW	GER	Filip Bilbija (from FC Ingolstadt)
8	MF	SVK	László Bénes (from Borussia Mönchengladbach)
11	FW	GHA	Ransford-Yeboah Königsdörffer (from Dynamo Dresden)
19	GK	GER	Matheo Raab (from 1. FC Kaiserslautern)
28	DF	SUI	Miro Muheim (from St. Gallen, previously on loan)
44	DF	CRO	Mario Vušković (from Hajduk Split, previously on loan)

Out:

No.	Pos.	Nation	Player
2	DF	GER	Jan Gyamerah (to 1. FC Nürnberg)
6	MF	GER	David Kinsombi (to SV Sandhausen)
7	MF	GEO	Giorgi Chakvetadze (loan return to Gent)
11	FW	DEN	Mikkel Kaufmann (loan return to Copenhagen)
19	FW	GER	Manuel Wintzheimer (to 1. FC Nürnberg)
27	DF	GER	Josha Vagnoman (to VfB Stuttgart)
48	FW	GER	Faride Alidou (to Eintracht Frankfurt)

=== Darmstadt 98 ===
In:

No.	Pos.	Nation	Player
14	FW	DEN	Magnus Warming (on loan from Torino)
28	MF	FRA	Yassin Ben Balla (from FC Ingolstadt)
29	FW	SWE	Oscar Vilhelmsson (from Göteborg)
30	GK	GER	Alexander Brunst (from Vejle)

Out:

No.	Pos.	Nation	Player
13	GK	GER	Morten Behrens (on loan to Waldhof Mannheim)
16	FW	GER	Luca Pfeiffer (loan return to Midtjylland)
24	DF	GER	Lasse Sobiech (to Stellenbosch)
27	MF	GER	Tim Skarke (to Union Berlin)
30	MF	POL	Adrian Stanilewicz (free agent)
34	MF	GER	Leon Müller (to FSV Frankfurt)
43	MF	AUT	Nemanja Celic (on loan to LASK)
—	FW	GER	Henry Crosthwaite (on loan to Astoria Walldorf, previously on loan at Rot-Weiß Koblenz)

=== FC St. Pauli ===
In:

No.	Pos.	Nation	Player
2	DF	GRE	Manolis Saliakas (from PAS Giannina)
4	DF	AUT	David Nemeth (from Mainz 05)
5	DF	KOS	Betim Fazliji (from Gallen)
11	FW	GER	Johannes Eggestein (from Antwerp)
16	MF	GER	Carlo Boukhalfa (from SC Freiburg, previously on loan at Jahn Regensburg)
24	MF	AUS	Connor Metcalfe (from Melbourne City)
27	FW	GER	David Otto (from 1899 Hoffenheim, previously on loan at Jahn Regensburg)

Out:

No.	Pos.	Nation	Player
2	DF	SWE	Sebastian Ohlsson (free agent)
3	DF	WAL	James Lawrence (free agent)
4	DF	GER	Philipp Ziereis (to LASK)
9	FW	AUT	Guido Burgstaller (to Rapid Wien)
10	MF	GER	Christopher Buchtmann (free agent)
11	MF	GER	Maximilian Dittgen (to FC Ingolstadt)
16	FW	DEN	Simon Makienok (free agent)
17	MF	GHA	Daniel-Kofi Kyereh (to SC Freiburg)
20	MF	GER	Finn Ole Becker (to 1899 Hoffenheim)
26	MF	GER	Rico Benatelli (free agent)
—	DF	GER	Marvin Senger (to MSV Duisburg, previously on loan at 1. FC Kaiserslautern)
—	MF	GER	Christian Viet (to Jahn Regensburg, previously on loan at Borussia Dortmund II)

=== 1. FC Heidenheim ===
In:

No.	Pos.	Nation	Player
21	MF	GER	Adrian Beck (from SSV Ulm)
26	MF	GER	Tim Köther (from Fortuna Düsseldorf II)
27	DF	GER	Thomas Keller (from FC Ingolstadt)
33	DF	USA	Lennard Maloney (from Borussia Dortmund II)
37	MF	GER	Jan-Niklas Beste (from Werder Bremen, previously on loan at Jahn Regensburg)

Out:

No.	Pos.	Nation	Player
5	DF	GER	Oliver Hüsing (to Arminia Bielefeld)
13	FW	GER	Robert Leipertz (to SC Paderborn)
15	FW	GER	Maurice Malone (loan return to FC Augsburg)
25	MF	GER	Julian Stark (to SC Freiburg II)
27	MF	AUT	Konstantin Kerschbaumer (to Wolfsberger AC)
29	MF	GER	Tobias Mohr (to Schalke 04)
36	DF	GER	Tim Seifert (to Berliner AK 07)
38	DF	GER	Gianni Mollo (free agent)

=== SC Paderborn 07 ===
In:

No.	Pos.	Nation	Player
4	DF	SUI	Jasper van der Werff (from Red Bull Salzburg, previously on loan)
7	FW	GER	Richmond Tachie (from Borussia Dortmund II)
11	FW	GER	Sirlord Conteh (from 1. FC Magdeburg)
13	FW	GER	Robert Leipertz (from 1. FC Heidenheim)
15	DF	GER	Tobias Müller (from 1. FC Magdeburg)
20	DF	POL	Adrian Gryszkiewicz (from Górnik Zabrze)
23	DF	PHI	Raphael Obermair (from 1. FC Magdeburg)
26	MF	GER	Sebastian Klaas (from VfL Osnabrück)
27	MF	GER	Kai Klefisch (from Viktoria Köln)
32	DF	GER	Robin Bormuth (from Karlsruher SC)
33	MF	GER	Marcel Hoffmeier (from Preußen Münster)

Out:

No.	Pos.	Nation	Player
3	DF	TOG	Frederic Ananou (to Hansa Rostock)
9	FW	GER	Kai Pröger (to Hansa Rostock)
12	DF	GER	Jesse Edem Tugbenyo (on loan to SC Verl)
13	MF	GER	Robin Yalçın (to Sivasspor)
16	DF	GER	Johannes Dörfler (on loan to Waldhof Mannheim)
19	FW	SUI	Kemal Ademi (loan return to Khimki)
22	MF	GER	Marco Stiepermann (to Wuppertaler SV)
23	MF	GER	Maximilian Thalhammer (to Jahn Regensburg)
25	DF	POR	Marcel Correia (to SV Elversberg)
27	FW	GER	Marvin Çuni (loan return to Bayern Munich II)
29	DF	NGR	Jamilu Collins (to Cardiff City)
31	MF	GER	Philipp Klement (loan return to VfB Stuttgart)
40	DF	GER	Justus Henke (on loan to Wuppertaler SV)
—	MF	GER	Luca Marseiler (to Viktoria Köln)

=== 1. FC Nürnberg ===
In:

No.	Pos.	Nation	Player
3	DF	TOG	Sadik Fofana (on loan from Bayer Leverkusen)
13	DF	GER	Erik Wekesser (from Jahn Regensburg)
18	FW	GER	Manuel Wintzheimer (from Hamburger SV)
23	FW	SUI	Kwadwo Duah (from St. Gallen)
25	MF	GER	Shawn Blum (from 1. FC Kaiserslautern youth)
28	DF	GER	Jan Gyamerah (from Hamburger SV)
32	DF	GER	Louis Breunig (from Würzburger Kickers)
33	FW	GER	Christoph Daferner (from Dynamo Dresden)

Out:

No.	Pos.	Nation	Player
2	DF	GER	Kilian Fischer (to VfL Wolfsburg)
10	FW	AUT	Nikola Dovedan (free agent)
14	MF	GER	Tom Krauß (loan return to RB Leipzig)
18	FW	GER	Dennis Borkowski (loan return to RB Leipzig)
21	MF	GER	Tim Latteier (to SpVgg Bayreuth)
27	FW	GER	Paul-Philipp Besong (on loan to Erzgebirge Aue)
33	DF	CRO	Mario Šuver (to Borussia Dortmund II)
34	DF	RUS	Konstantin Rausch (free agent)
35	DF	GER	Noel Knothe (to FSV Frankfurt)
—	DF	GER	Linus Rosenlöcher (to Erzgebirge Aue, previously on loan at Esbjerg fB)
—	MF	SLO	Adam Gnezda Čerin (to Panathinaikos, previously on loan at Rijeka)

=== Holstein Kiel ===
In:

No.	Pos.	Nation	Player
1	GK	GER	Tim Schreiber (on loan from RB Leipzig, previously on loan at Hallescher FC)
17	DF	GER	Timo Becker (from Schalke 04, previously on loan at Hansa Rostock)
20	FW	GER	Fiete Arp (from Bayern Munich II, previously on loan)
25	MF	GER	Marvin Schulz (from Luzern)
30	FW	GER	Marvin Obuz (on loan from 1. FC Köln)

Out:

No.	Pos.	Nation	Player
1	GK	GRE	Ioannis Gelios (to Bandırmaspor)
7	MF	GER	Ahmet Arslan (on loan to Dynamo Dresden)
25	DF	GER	Phil Neumann (to Hannover 96)
29	FW	GER	Joshua Mees (on loan to Jahn Regensburg)

=== Fortuna Düsseldorf ===
In:

No.	Pos.	Nation	Player
4	MF	JPN	Ao Tanaka (from Kawasaki Frontale, previously on loan)
22	DF	AUT	Benjamin Böckle (from Liefering)
30	DF	NED	Jordy de Wijs (from Queens Park Rangers, previously on loan)

Out:

No.	Pos.	Nation	Player
6	MF	GER	Edgar Prib (free agent)
7	DF	GER	Florian Hartherz (to Maccabi Netanya)
15	GK	GER	Kai Eisele (to Karlsruher SC)
18	MF	GER	Thomas Pledl (free agent)
22	DF	GRE	Leonardo Koutris (loan return to Olympiacos)
32	FW	SVK	Róbert Boženík (loan return to Feyenoord)
36	DF	TOG	Nikell Touglo (to Viktoria Berlin)
47	FW	GER	Lex-Tyger Lobinger (to 1. FC Kaiserslautern)

=== Hannover 96 ===
In:

No.	Pos.	Nation	Player
3	DF	GER	Ekin Çelebi (from VfB Stuttgart II)
5	DF	GER	Phil Neumann (from Holstein Kiel)
6	MF	GER	Fabian Kunze (from Arminia Bielefeld)
7	MF	GER	Max Besuschkow (from Jahn Regensburg)
8	MF	GER	Enzo Leopold (from SC Freiburg II)
11	MF	AUT	Louis Schaub (from 1. FC Köln)
16	FW	NOR	Håvard Nielsen (from Greuther Fürth)
18	DF	GER	Derrick Köhn (from Willem II)
19	MF	GER	Eric Uhlmann (from RB Leipzig youth)
24	MF	CYP	Antonio Foti (on loan from Eintracht Frankfurt)
33	GK	GER	Toni Stahl (from Energie Cottbus)

Out:

No.	Pos.	Nation	Player
1	GK	DEN	Martin Hansen (to OB)
3	DF	SWE	Niklas Hult (free agent)
8	MF	GER	Mike Frantz (to 1. FC Saarbrücken)
11	MF	GER	Linton Maina (to 1. FC Köln)
13	MF	GER	Dominik Kaiser (free agent)
17	FW	AUT	Lukas Hinterseer (to Hansa Rostock)
20	MF	GER	Philipp Ochs (to SV Sandhausen)
24	DF	TUN	Marc Lamti (free agent)
28	DF	GER	Marcel Franke (to Karlsruher SC)
30	GK	GER	Marlon Sündermann (free agent)
35	MF	NED	Mark Diemers (loan return to Feyenoord)
40	FW	GER	Lawrence Ennali (on loan to Rot-Weiss Essen)
—	MF	GER	Simon Stehle (on loan to Viktoria Köln, previously on loan at 1. FC Kaiserslautern)

=== Karlsruher SC ===
In:

No.	Pos.	Nation	Player
1	GK	GER	Kai Eisele (from Fortuna Düsseldorf)
4	DF	GER	Florian Ballas (from Erzgebirge Aue)
7	FW	SUI	Simone Rapp (from Vaduz)
14	FW	DEN	Mikkel Kaufmann (on loan from Copenhagen, previously on loan at Hamburger SV)
26	MF	GER	Paul Nebel (on loan from Mainz 05)
28	DF	GER	Marcel Franke (from Hannover 96)
36	MF	AUT	Kelvin Arase (from Rapid Wien)

Out:

No.	Pos.	Nation	Player
1	GK	AUT	Markus Kuster (free agent)
4	DF	NED	Ricardo van Rhijn (free agent)
7	DF	GER	Marc Lorenz (to Preußen Münster)
14	MF	GER	Benjamin Goller (loan return to Werder Bremen)
28	GK	GER	Paul Löhr (free agent)
30	GK	GER	Niklas Heeger (to Dynamo Dresden)
32	DF	GER	Robin Bormuth (to SC Paderborn)
33	FW	GER	Philipp Hofmann (to VfL Bochum)
34	DF	GER	Jannis Rabold (free agent)
37	FW	GER	Fabio Kaufmann (to Eintracht Braunschweig)
—	MF	GER	Lukas Fröde (to Hansa Rostock, previously on loan)

=== Hansa Rostock ===
In:

No.	Pos.	Nation	Player
6	MF	GER	Dennis Dressel (from 1860 Munich)
11	MF	GER	Morris Schröter (from Dynamo Dresden)
19	FW	GER	Kai Pröger (from SC Paderborn)
22	FW	AUT	Lukas Hinterseer (from Hannover 96)
23	GK	GER	Nils Körber (from Hertha BSC)
24	DF	PHI	John-Patrick Strauß (from Erzgebirge Aue)
27	DF	TOG	Frederic Ananou (from SC Paderborn)
29	MF	LUX	Sébastien Thill (from Progrès Niederkorn, previously on loan at Sheriff Tiraspol)
30	GK	GER	Max Hagemoser (from 1. FC Köln youth)
34	MF	GER	Lukas Fröde (from Karlsruher SC, previously on loan)

Out:

No.	Pos.	Nation	Player
2	DF	GER	Timo Becker (loan return to Schalke 04)
3	DF	GER	Julian Riedel (to Waldhof Mannheim)
6	MF	GER	Björn Rother (to Rot-Weiss Essen)
8	MF	GER	Bentley Baxter Bahn (to Waldhof Mannheim)
11	FW	GER	Streli Mamba (loan return to Kairat Almaty)
17	MF	GER	Hanno Behrens (to Persija Jakarta)
19	FW	GER	Robin Meißner (loan return to Hamburger SV)
21	MF	SLO	Nik Omladič (free agent)
22	GK	GER	Luis Klatte (to Babelsberg 03)
23	DF	GER	Jonathan Meier (loan return to Mainz 05)
26	FW	UKR	Danylo Sikan (loan return to Shakhtar Donetsk)
30	GK	GER	Ben Voll (to Viktoria Köln)
38	MF	GER	Tobias Schwede (to 1. FC Saarbrücken)
—	FW	GER	Michel Ulrich (to Chemnitzer FC, previously on loan at Berliner AK 07)

=== SV Sandhausen ===
In:

No.	Pos.	Nation	Player
6	MF	GER	Abu-Bekir El-Zein (from Borussia Dortmund Youth Sector)
9	FW	CZE	Matěj Pulkrab (from Sparta Prague)
10	MF	GER	David Kinsombi (from Hamburger SV)
11	MF	GER	Philipp Ochs (from Hannover 96)
37	MF	ISR	Joseph Ganda (from Admira Wacker)

Out:

No.	Pos.	Nation	Player
10	MF	GER	Julius Biada (to 1. FC Saarbrücken)
11	FW	GER	Erich Berko (to Maccabi Netanya)
13	GK	GER	Rick Wulle (free agent)
14	DF	GER	Tim Kister (retired)
16	GK	GER	Felix Wiedwald (free agent)
21	MF	GER	Nils Seufert (loan return to Greuther Fürth)
24	FW	LUX	Maurice Deville (free agent)
29	FW	AUS	Alou Kuol (loan return to VfB Stuttgart)
37	FW	GER	Pascal Testroet (to FC Ingolstadt)
—	MF	GER	Carlo Sickinger (to SV Elversberg, previously on loan)
—	MF	GER	Gianluca Gaudino (to Lausanne, previously on loan at SCR Altach)

=== Jahn Regensburg ===
In:

No.	Pos.	Nation	Player
1	GK	AUT	Dejan Stojanović (from Middlesbrough, previously on loan at FC Ingolstadt)
8	MF	GER	Maximilian Thalhammer (from SC Paderborn)
9	FW	GER	Prince Osei Owusu (from Erzgebirge Aue)
16	MF	GER	Oscar Schönfelder (on loan from Werder Bremen)
22	FW	GER	Minos Gouras (from 1. FC Saarbrücken)
29	FW	GER	Joshua Mees (on loan from Holstein Kiel)
30	MF	GER	Christian Viet (from FC St. Pauli, previously on loan at Borussia Dortmund II)

Out:

No.	Pos.	Nation	Player
1	GK	GER	Alexander Meyer (to Borussia Dortmund)
4	MF	GER	Jan-Niklas Beste (loan return to Werder Bremen)
7	MF	GER	Max Besuschkow (to Hannover 96)
13	DF	GER	Erik Wekesser (to 1. FC Nürnberg)
14	FW	GER	David Otto (loan return to 1899 Hoffenheim)
15	MF	NZL	Sarpreet Singh (loan return to Bayern Munich II)
18	MF	GER	Christoph Moritz (free agent)
22	MF	GER	Carlo Boukhalfa (loan return to SC Freiburg)
30	GK	GER	Kevin Kunz (to Carl Zeiss Jena)
—	MF	GER	Tom Baack (to SC Verl, previously on loan)
—	FW	GER	André Becker (to Viktoria Köln, previously on loan at Würzburger Kickers)

=== 1. FC Magdeburg ===
In:

No.	Pos.	Nation	Player
5	DF	GER	Jamie Lawrence (on loan from Bayern Munich II)
6	MF	GER	Daniel Elfadli (from VfR Aalen)
11	MF	MAR	Mohamed El Hankouri (from Groningen)
12	DF	CAN	Belal Halbouni (from Werder Bremen II)
17	FW	BRA	Léo Scienza (from Schalke 04 II)
21	DF	GER	Tim Stappmann (from Rot-Weiß Oberhausen)
25	DF	CIV	Silas Gnaka (from Eupen)
27	DF	GER	Malcolm Cacutalua (from Erzgebirge Aue)
28	GK	GER	Tim Boss (from Wehen Wiesbaden)

Out:

No.	Pos.	Nation	Player
2	DF	GER	Tobias Knost (to SC Verl)
5	DF	GER	Tobias Müller (to SC Paderborn)
6	MF	POL	Adrian Małachowski (to Waldhof Mannheim)
8	MF	GER	Sebastian Jakubiak (free agent)
15	DF	GER	Henry Rorig (to VfL Osnabrück)
17	FW	GER	Sirlord Conteh (to SC Paderborn)
27	DF	GER	Korbinian Burger (to Erzgebirge Aue)
28	DF	PHI	Raphael Obermair (to SC Paderborn)
31	MF	GER	Nico Granatowski (free agent)
39	GK	GER	Benjamin Leneis (free agent)
—	MF	GER	Ole Hoch (to Germania Halberstadt, previously on loan)
—	DF	GER	Philipp Harant (to Chemie Leipzig, previously on loan at Berliner AK 07)

=== Eintracht Braunschweig ===
In:

No.	Pos.	Nation	Player
1	GK	GER	Ron-Thorben Hoffmann (from Bayern Munich, previously on loan at Sunderland)
3	DF	SUI	Saulo Decarli (from VfL Bochum)
8	MF	GER	Mehmet Ibrahimi (on loan from RB Leipzig)
10	MF	NED	Immanuel Pherai (from Borussia Dortmund II)
11	FW	GER	Luc Ihorst (from Werder Bremen II, previously on loan)
19	DF	GER	Anton Donkor (from Waldhof Mannheim)
37	FW	GER	Fabio Kaufmann (from Karlsruher SC)

Out:

No.	Pos.	Nation	Player
1	GK	GER	Yannik Bangsow (on loan to Alemannia Aachen)
3	DF	GER	Lasse Schlüter (free agent)
8	MF	GER	Iba May (free agent)
10	MF	POL	Martin Kobylański (to 1860 Munich)
13	GK	GER	Julian Bauer (to 1. FC Saarbrücken)
18	FW	GER	Fabrice Hartmann (loan return to RB Leipzig)
19	FW	GER	Sebastian Müller (loan return to Arminia Bielefeld)
21	MF	GER	Jomaine Consbruch (loan return to Arminia Bielefeld)
34	DF	GER	Jannis Kleeberg (to Berliner AK 07)

=== 1. FC Kaiserslautern ===
In:

No.	Pos.	Nation	Player
1	GK	GER	Andreas Luthe (from Union Berlin)
18	GK	GER	Julian Krahl (from Viktoria Köln)
22	DF	GER	Lars Bünning (from SV Meppen)
27	FW	GER	Lex-Tyger Lobinger (from Fortuna Düsseldorf)
31	FW	GER	Ben Zolinski (from Erzgebirge Aue)
37	DF	GER	Erik Durm (from Eintracht Frankfurt)

Out:

No.	Pos.	Nation	Player
3	DF	GER	Marvin Senger (loan return to FC St. Pauli)
4	DF	GER	Alexander Winkler (free agent)
14	FW	GER	Lucas Röser (to SSV Ulm)
24	MF	GER	Felix Götze (loan return to FC Augsburg)
25	MF	GER	Simon Stehle (loan return to Hannover 96)
27	MF	GER	Anil Gözütok (free agent)
31	GK	GER	Lorenz Otto (to SSV Ulm)
40	GK	GER	Matheo Raab (to Hamburger SV)
—	FW	GER	Elias Huth (to Erzgebirge Aue, previously on loan at Hallescher FC)

== See also ==
- 2022–23 Bundesliga
- 2022–23 2. Bundesliga
