= 2020–21 Karlsruher SC season =

Karlsruher SC
2020–21 season
- Chairman: Ingo Wellenreuther
- Manager: Christian Eichner
- Stadium: Wildparkstadion
- 2. Bundesliga: 6th
- DFB-Pokal: First round
- Top goalscorer: League: Philipp Hofmann (13 goals); All: Philipp Hofmann (13 goals)
Home colours	Away colours

The 2020–21 Karlsruher SC season was the club's 69th season in existence and the club's 2nd consecutive season in the second flight of German football. In addition to the domestic league, Karlsruher SC participated in this season's edition of the DFB-Pokal, being eliminated in the first round. The season covers the period from 1 July 2020 to 30 June 2021.

== Players ==
=== First-team squad ===
As of 8 October 2020

Note: Flags indicate national team as defined under FIFA eligibility rules; some limited exceptions apply. Players may hold more than one non-FIFA nationality.

No.	Pos.	Nation	Player
1	GK	AUT	Markus Kuster
2	DF	GER	Sebastian Jung
3	DF	GER	Philip Heise
4	MF	GER	Lukas Fröde
5	DF	GER	David Pisot
7	MF	GER	Marc Lorenz
8	MF	GER	Jérôme Gondorf (captain)
10	MF	GER	Marvin Wanitzek
11	MF	KOR	Choi Kyoung-rok
16	DF	GER	Philip Heise
17	FW	AUT	Marco Djuricin
18	MF	GER	David Trivunic
19	FW	GER	Dominik Kother
20	MF	GER	Alexander Groiß

No.	Pos.	Nation	Player
21	DF	GER	Marco Thiede
22	DF	AUT	Christoph Kobald
23	DF	LUX	Dirk Carlson
24	FW	SEN	Babacar Guèye
25	MF	GER	Janis Hanek
27	DF	GER	Marlon Dinger
28	GK	GER	Paul Löhr
31	FW	GER	Malik Batmaz
32	DF	GER	Robin Bormuth
33	FW	GER	Philipp Hofmann
34	DF	GER	Jannis Rabold
35	GK	GER	Marius Gersbeck
39	MF	GER	Benjamin Goller

=== Out on loan ===
Note: Flags indicate national team as defined under FIFA eligibility rules; some limited exceptions apply. Players may hold more than one non-FIFA nationality.

No.	Pos.	Nation	Player
9	FW	GER	Marvin Pourié

== Pre-season and friendlies ==
Win Draw Loss Fixtures

22 August 2020 Friendly	LASK (Austria)	0–2	(Germany) Karlsruher SC	Pasching, Austria
17:00 CEST (UTC+2)			Hofmann 45'; Djuricin 85'	Stadium: Raiffeisen Arena; Attendance: 0

8 October 2020 Friendly	Mainz 05 (Germany)	2–4	(Germany) Karlsruher SC	Mainz, Germany
14:00 CEST (UTC+2)	Hack 59'; Mateta 60'	Report	Goller 27'; Batmaz 55'; Djuricin 66'; Guèye 82'	Stadium: Stadion am Bruchweg; Attendance: 60; Referee: Robert Kampka

== Competitions ==
=== Overview ===
Competition	First match	Last match	Starting round	Record							
Competition	First match	Last match	Starting round	Pld	W	D	L	GF	GA	GD	Win %
2. Bundesliga	19 September 2020	23 May 2021	Matchday 1	5	1	1	3	4	5	−1	20.00
DFB-Pokal	12 September 2020	12 September 2020	First round	1	0	0	1	0	1	−1	0.00
Total				6	1	1	4	4	6	−2	16.67

Last updated: September 2020
Source: Competitions

=== 2. Bundesliga ===
==== League table ====
Pos	Team	Pld	W	D	L	GF	GA	GD	Pts
4	Hamburger SV	34	16	10	8	71	44	+27	58
5	Fortuna Düsseldorf	34	16	8	10	55	46	+9	56
6	Karlsruher SC	34	14	10	10	51	44	+7	52
7	Darmstadt 98	34	15	6	13	63	55	+8	51
8	1. FC Heidenheim	34	15	6	13	49	49	0	51

Source: DFB
Rules for classification: 1) Points; 2) Goal difference; 3) Goals scored; 4) Head-to-head points; 5) Head-to-head goal difference; 6) Head-to-head away goals scored; 7) Away goals scored; 8) Play-off.

==== Results summary ====
Overall								Home						Away					
Pld	W	D	L	GF	GA	GD	Pts	W	D	L	GF	GA	GD	W	D	L	GF	GA	GD
11	5	1	5	17	13	+4	16	2	0	3	8	7	+1	3	1	2	9	6	+3

Last updated: December 2020.
Source: Kicker

==== Results by round ====
Round	1	2	3	4	5	6	7	8	9	10	11	12	13	14	15	16
Ground	A	H	A	H	A	A	H	A	A	H	A	H	A	H	A	H
Result	L	L	L	W	D	D	W	W	W	W	L					
Position	16	17	18	17	15	17	15	9	8	5	9					

Updated to match(es) played on December 2020. Source: Kicker
A = Away; H = Home; W = Win; D = Draw; L = Loss

==== Matches ====
The league fixtures were announced on 7 August 2020.

19 September 2020 1	Hannover 96	2–0	Karlsruher SC	Hannover
13:00	Kaiser 25'; Maina 85'	Report		Stadium: HDI-Arena; Attendance: 500; Referee: Tobias Stieler

27 September 2020 2	Karlsruher SC	0–1	VfL Bochum	Karlsruhe
13:30		Report	Zoller 14'	Stadium: Wildparkstadion; Attendance: 1,200; Referee: Marco Fritz

3 October 2020 3	Jahn Regensburg	1–0	Karlsruher SC	Regensburg
13:00	Albers 44'	Report		Stadium: Jahnstadion Regensburg; Attendance: 3,042; Referee: Lasse Koslowski

17 October 2020 4	Karlsruher SC	3–0	SV Sandhausen	Karlsruhe
13:00	Hofmann 3'; Kother 30'; Kobald 47'	Report		Stadium: Wildparkstadion; Attendance: 1,200; Referee: Frank Willenborg

23 October 2020 5	1. FC Nürnberg	1–1	Karlsruher SC	Nuremberg
18:30	Lohkemper 15'	Report	Wanitzek 53'	Stadium: Max-Morlock-Stadion; Attendance: 0 Referee: Harm Osmers

1 November 2020 6	Karlsruher SC	3–4	SV Darmstadt 98	Karlsruhe
13:30	Hofmann 22', 81'; Wanitzek 44'	Report	Kempe 9', 90+3'; Pálsson 65'; Dursun 77'	Stadium: Wildparkstadion; Attendance: 0 Referee: Arne Aarnink

8 November 2020 7	FC St. Pauli	0–3	Karlsruher SC	Hamburg
13:30		Report	Thiede 4'; Gondorf 50'; Hofmann 76'	Stadium: Millerntor-Stadion; Attendance: 0 Referee: Alexander Sather

21 November 2020 8	Eintracht Braunschweig	1–3	Karlsruher SC	Braunschweig
13:00	Proschwitz 31'	Report	Choi 14', 63'; Wanitzek 18'	Stadium: Eintracht-Stadion; Attendance: 0 Referee: Patrick Hanslbauer

28 November 2020 9	Karlsruher SC	1–0	SC Paderborn 07	Karlsruhe
13:00	Daniel Gordon 7'	Report		Stadium: Wildparkstadion; Attendance: 0 Referee: Michael Bacher

5 December 2020 10	VfL Osnabrück	1–2	Karlsruher SC	Osnabrück
13:00	Beermann 28'	Report	Dominik Kother 77'; Philipp Hofmann 88'	Stadium: Bremer Brücke; Attendance: 0 Referee: Patrick Ittrich

11	Karlsruher SC	1–2	Fortuna Düsseldorf	Karlsruhe
13:30	Hofmann 72'	Report	Krajnc 12'; Peterson 57'	Stadium: Wildparkstadion; Attendance: 0 Referee: Tobias Reichel

17 December 2020 12	Erzgebirge Aue	v	Karlsruher SC	Aue
20:30		Report		Stadium: Sparkassen-Erzgebirgsstadion; Attendance: 0

21 December 2020 13	Karlsruher SC	v	Hamburger SV	Karlsruhe
20:30		Report		Stadium: Wildparkstadion; Attendance: 0

2 January 2021 14	Würzburger Kickers	v	Karlsruher SC	Würzburg
13:00		Report		Stadium: flyeralarm Arena; Attendance: 0

8 January 2021 15	Karlsruher SC	v	SpVgg Greuther Fürth	Karlsruhe
18:30		Report		Stadium: Wildparkstadion; Attendance: 0

=== DFB-Pokal ===
==== Matches ====
12 September 2020 First round	Karlsruher SC	0–1 (a.e.t.)	Union Berlin	Karlsruhe
18:30		Report	Schlotterbeck 118'	Stadium: Wildparkstadion; Attendance: 450; Referee: Benjamin Cortus
