= Alexander Groiß =

German footballer (born 1998)

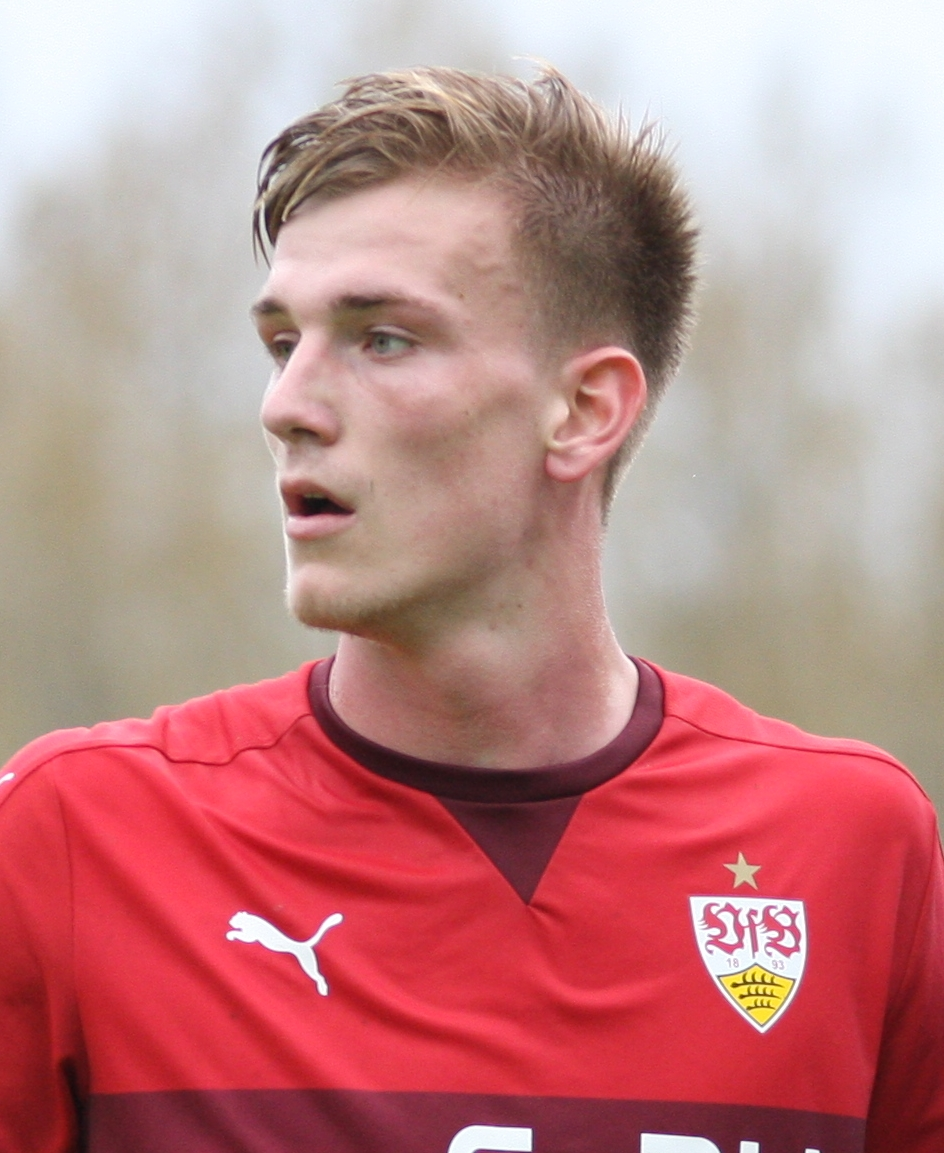
- Groiß in 2016

Personal information
- Date of birth: 1 July 1998 (age 28)
- Place of birth: Aalen, Germany
- Height: 1.90 m (6 ft 3 in)
- Position: Defensive midfielder

Team information
- Current team: VfB Stuttgart II
- Number: 6

Youth career
- –2012: FC Schechingen
- 2012–2017: VfB Stuttgart

Senior career*
Years	Team	Apps	(Gls)
2016–2018	VfB Stuttgart II	36	(0)
2018–2021	Karlsruher SC	39	(0)
2021–2022	1. FC Saarbrücken	23	(0)
2022–2023	SpVgg Bayreuth	23	(0)
2023–	VfB Stuttgart II	64	(3)

International career^{‡}
2013	Germany U15	2	(0)
2015	Germany U18	6	(0)
2016	Germany U19	1	(0)
- * Club domestic league appearances and goals as of 30 May 2026 ‡ National team caps and goals as of 04:23, 19 September 2018 (UTC)

Alexander Groiß (born 1 July 1998) is a German professional footballer who plays as a defensive midfielder for 3. Liga club VfB Stuttgart II.

== Career statistics ==
As of match played 10 September 2022

Appearances and goals by club, season and competition
Club	Season	League			DFB-Pokal		Total	
Club	Season	Division	Apps	Goals	Apps	Goals	Apps	Goals
Stuttgart II	2015–16	3. Liga	2	0	—		2	0
Stuttgart II	2017–18	Regionalliga Südwest	31	0	—		31	0
Stuttgart II	2018–19	Regionalliga Südwest	3	0	—		3	0
Stuttgart II	Total		36	0	—		36	0
Karlsruher SC	2018–19	3. Liga	17	0	—		17	0
Karlsruher SC	2019–20	2. Bundesliga	12	0	—		12	0
Karlsruher SC	2020–21	2. Bundesliga	10	0	1	0	11	0
Karlsruher SC	Total		39	0	1	0	40	0
1. FC Saarbrücken	2021–22	3. Liga	23	0	—		23	0
SpVgg Bayreuth	2022–23	3. Liga	5	0	1	0	6	0
Career total			103	0	2	0	105	0
