= Markus Kuster =

Austrian footballer

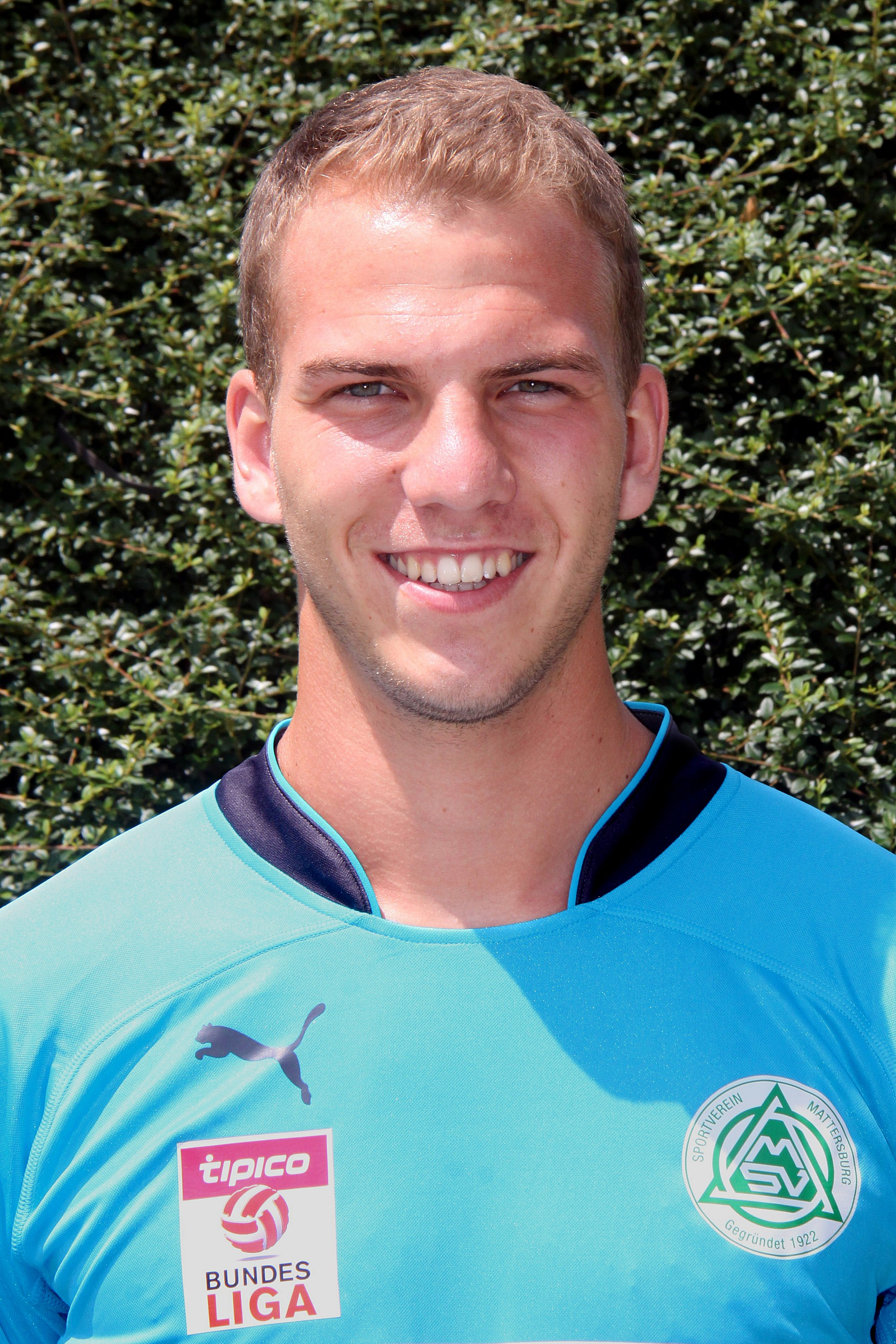
- Kuster with SV Mattersburg in July 2015

Personal information
- Date of birth: 22 February 1994 (age 32)
- Place of birth: Vienna, Austria
- Height: 1.94 m (6 ft 4 in)
- Position: Goalkeeper

Team information
- Current team: Winterthur
- Number: 1

Youth career
- 2001–2007: SK Parma
- 2007–2009: SC Neusiedl am See
- 2009–2010: AKA Burgenland

Senior career*
Years	Team	Apps	(Gls)
2009–2014	SV Mattersburg II	51	(0)
2011–2020	SV Mattersburg	199	(0)
2020–2022	Karlsruher SC	5	(0)
2023–2025	Winterthur	34	(0)
2025	Enosis Neon Paralimni	6	(0)
2026–	Winterthur	6	(0)

International career^{‡}
2014–2016	Austria U21	6	(0)
- * Club domestic league appearances and goals as of 18 September 2026 ‡ National team caps and goals as of 30 March 2017

Markus Kuster (born 22 February 1994) is an Austrian professional footballer who plays as a goalkeeper for Swiss Challenge League club Winterthur.

== Club career ==
On 19 December 2022, Kuster signed with Winterthur in Switzerland until the end of the 2022–23 season.

== International career ==
Kuster was called up to the Austrian first team on 25 March 2017 for a friendly match against Finland, replacing the injured Andreas Lukse.
