= Babacar Guèye =

Senegalese footballer

Personal information
- Date of birth: 31 December 1994 (age 31)
- Place of birth: Dakar, Senegal
- Height: 1.90 m (6 ft 3 in)
- Position: Forward

Senior career*
Years	Team	Apps	(Gls)
2013–2014	AS Douanes		
2014–2015	Troyes B	17	(9)
2014–2016	Troyes	14	(1)
2016–2018	Hannover 96	2	(0)
2017	→ Zulte Waregem (loan)	12	(2)
2017–2018	→ Sint-Truidense (loan)	15	(1)
2018	Hannover 96 II	5	(2)
2018–2020	SC Paderborn	27	(6)
2020–2021	Karlsruher SC	31	(3)
2021–2022	Erzgebirge Aue	14	(2)
2022	Kocaelispor	12	(4)
2022–2023	Ohod	9	(2)
2026–	Immigration	3	(0)
- * Club domestic league appearances and goals as of 12 February 2022

Babacar Guèye (born 31 December 1994) is a Senegalese professional footballer who plays as a forward.

== Career ==
On 31 January 2022, after half a year with the club, Guèye agreed the termination of his contract with Erzgebirge Aue which was to run until 2023.

On 8 February 2022, Guèye signed a 1.5-year contract with Kocaelispor in Turkey.

On 3 August 2022, Guèye joined Saudi Arabian club Ohod on a free transfer.

In August 2023, Guèye joined the Voltigeurs de Châteaubriant football club.

== Career statistics ==
=== Club ===
As of match played 31 January 2022

Appearances and goals by club, season and competition
Club	Season	League			Cup		Other		Total	
Club	Season	Division	Apps	Goals	Apps	Goals	Apps	Goals	Apps	Goals
Troyes II	2014–15	CFA	12	5	—		—		12	5
Troyes II	2015–16	CFA	5	4	—		—		5	4
Troyes II	Total		17	9	0	0	0	0	17	9
Troyes	2014–15	Ligue 2	3	0	0	0	0	0	3	0
Troyes	2015–16	Ligue 1	11	1	1	0	0	0	12	1
Troyes	Total		14	1	1	0	0	0	15	1
Hannover 96	2016–17	2. Bundesliga	2	0	2	0	—		4	0
Zulte Waregem (loan)	2016–17	First Division A	12	2	3	1	—		15	3
Sint-Truidense (loan)	2017–18	First Division A	15	1	1	0	—		16	1
Hannover 96 II	2018–19	Regionalliga Nord	5	2	—		—		5	2
SC Paderborn	2018–19	2. Bundesliga	24	6	2	2	—		26	8
SC Paderborn	2019–20	Bundesliga	3	0	0	0	—		3	0
SC Paderborn	Total		27	6	2	2	0	0	29	8
Karlsruher SC	2019–20	2. Bundesliga	9	1	0	0	—		9	1
Karlsruher SC	2020–21	2. Bundesliga	22	2	0	0	—		22	2
Karlsruher SC	Total		31	3	0	0	0	0	31	3
Erzgebirge Aue	2021–22	2. Bundesliga	14	2	1	0	—		15	2
Career total			137	26	10	3	0	0	147	29

== Honours ==
Zulte Waregem

- Belgian Cup: 2016–17
