= Tim Seifert (footballer) =

German footballer

Personal information
- Date of birth: 25 June 2002 (age 24)
- Place of birth: Illertissen, Germany
- Height: 1.83 m (6 ft 0 in)
- Position: Defender

Team information
- Current team: TSV Essingen

Youth career
- –2015: SSV Ulm
- 2015–2018: Bayern Munich
- 2018–2021: 1. FC Heidenheim

Senior career*
Years	Team	Apps	(Gls)
2021–2022	1. FC Heidenheim	1	(0)
2022–2023	Berliner AK	14	(0)
2023–	TSV Essingen	33	(6)
- * Club domestic league appearances and goals as of 1 June 2024

Tim Seifert (born 25 June 2002) is a German footballer who plays as a defender for Oberliga Baden-Württemberg club TSV Essingen.

== Career ==
After playing youth football for SSV Ulm, Bayern Munich and 1. FC Heidenheim, Seifert started his senior career at 1. FC Heidenheim, having been promoted to their first-team in summer 2021. He made his senior debut on 31 July 2021, coming on as an 85th-minute substitute in a 2–1 2. Bundesliga win over FC Ingolstadt.

In June 2022, Seifert moved to Berliner AK.
