= Andreas Lukse =

Austrian footballer

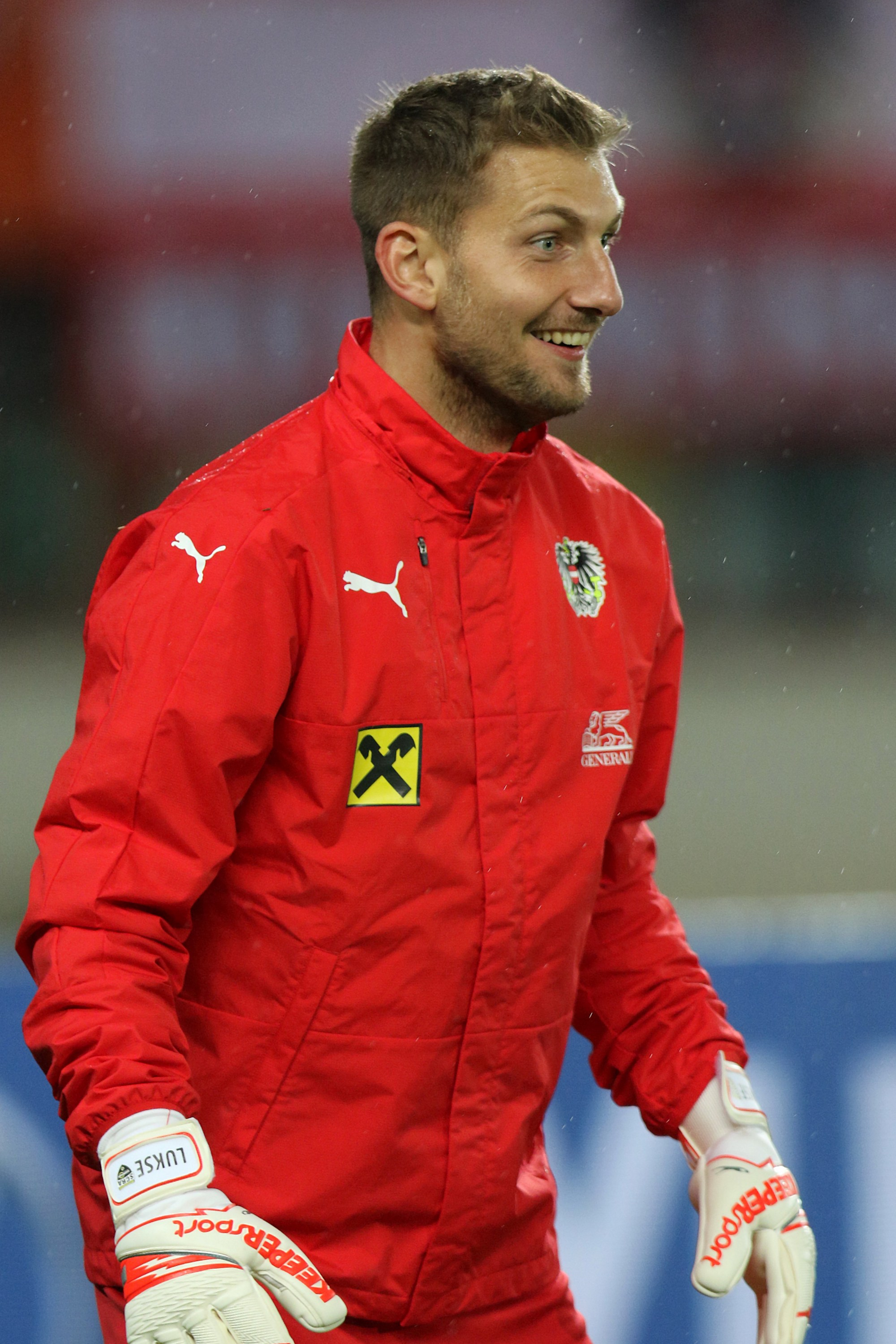
- Lukse warming up for Austria in 2016

Personal information
- Full name: Andreas Lukse
- Date of birth: 8 November 1987 (age 38)
- Place of birth: Vienna, Austria
- Height: 1.87 m (6 ft 2 in)
- Position: Goalkeeper

Team information
- Current team: Blau-Weiß Linz
- Number: 12

Youth career
- 1994–2005: Rapid Wien

Senior career*
Years	Team	Apps	(Gls)
2005–2009	Rapid Wien Amateure	74	(0)
2008	→ DSV Leoben (loan)	12	(0)
2008–2011	Rapid Wien	9	(0)
2009–2010	→ Sturm Graz Amateure (loan)	3	(0)
2010–2011	→ First Vienna (loan)	16	(0)
2011–2013	FC Lustenau	28	(0)
2013–2014	Kapfenberger SV	26	(0)
2014–2019	Rheindorf Altach	80	(0)
2019–2021	1. FC Nürnberg	2	(0)
2021–2023	First Vienna	44	(0)
2023–	Blau-Weiß Linz	5	(0)

International career^{‡}
2004	Austria U17	4	(0)
2005	Austria U19	6	(0)
2006	Austria U20	4	(0)
2007–2008	Austria U21	2	(0)
2016	Austria	1	(0)
- * Club domestic league appearances and goals as of 27 December 2024 ‡ National team caps and goals as of 7 January 2017

Andreas Lukse (born 8 November 1987) is an Austrian professional footballer who plays for Blau-Weiß Linz.

== Club career ==
On 5 July 2019, Lukse signed for 1. FC Nürnberg on a free transfer from SC Rheindorf Altach.

On 7 August 2023, Lukse signed for Blau-Weiß Linz.

== International career ==
Lukse got his first call up to the senior Austria squad for a friendly against Switzerland in November 2015.
