= Dirk Carlson =

Luxembourgish footballer (born 1998)

Personal information
- Date of birth: 1 April 1998 (age 28)
- Place of birth: Portland, Oregon, U.S.
- Height: 1.86 m (6 ft 1 in)
- Position: Left back

Team information
- Current team: Dinamo Batumi
- Number: 14

Senior career*
Years	Team	Apps	(Gls)
2015–2016	RFC Union Luxembourg	1	(0)
2016–2018	Union Titus Pétange	32	(0)
2018–2019	Grasshoppers II	29	(0)
2019–2021	Karlsruher SC	26	(0)
2021–2022	Erzgebirge Aue	28	(0)
2022–2023	ADO Den Haag	4	(0)
2023	→ SKN St. Pölten (loan)	12	(0)
2023–2026	SKN St. Pölten	78	(3)
2026–	Dinamo Batumi	1	(0)

International career^{‡}
2016–	Luxembourg	78	(0)
- * Club domestic league appearances and goals as of 17 May 2026 ‡ National team caps and goals as of 16 November 2026

Dirk Carlson (born 1 April 1998) is a professional footballer who plays for Georgian club Dinamo Batumi as a left back. Born in the United States, he plays for the Luxembourg national team.

== Club career ==
Carlson has previously played club football for RFC Union Luxembourg, Union Titus Pétange, Grasshopper Club Zürich, Karlsruher SC and Erzgebirge Aue.

On 6 February 2023, Carlson joined SKN St. Pölten in Austria on loan until the end of the season, with an option to buy. At the end of the season, the transfer was made permanent, with Carlson signing a three-year contract with the club.

In early July 2026, Carlson signed for Erovnuli Liga club Dinamo Batumi on a deal until the end of 2027.

== International career ==
He made his international debut for the Luxembourg national team on 2 September 2016 in a 3–1 defeat against Latvia.

=== International ===
As of match played 16 November 2026

Appearances and goals by national team and year
National team	Year	Apps	Goals
Luxembourg
Luxembourg	2016	3	0
Luxembourg	2017	2	0
Luxembourg	2018	8	0
Luxembourg	2019	10	0
Luxembourg	2020	7	0
Luxembourg	2021	8	0
Luxembourg	2022	7	0
Luxembourg	2023	8	0
Luxembourg	2024	8	0
Luxembourg	2025	8	0
Luxembourg	2026	9	0
Total		78	0
