= Janis Hanek =

German footballer

Personal information
- Date of birth: 12 February 1999 (age 27)
- Place of birth: Rastatt, Germany
- Height: 1.79 m (5 ft 10 in)
- Position: Midfielder

Team information
- Current team: SV Oberachern
- Number: 29

Youth career
- –2008: Rastatter SC
- 2008–2018: Karlsruher SC

Senior career*
Years	Team	Apps	(Gls)
2017–2018	Karlsruher SC II	2	(0)
2018–2021	Karlsruher SC	8	(0)
2021–2022	FC Astoria Walldorf	17	(0)
2023–	SV Oberachern	12	(0)
- * Club domestic league appearances and goals as of 1 June 2024

Janis Hanek (born 12 February 1999) is a German professional footballer who plays as a midfielder for SV Oberachern.

== Career ==
Hanek made his professional debut for Karlsruher SC on 19 August 2018, appearing in the first round of the 2018–19 DFB-Pokal against Bundesliga side Hannover 96. He was substituted on in the 62nd minute for Saliou Sané, with the match finishing as a 6–0 home loss.
