= Kebba Badjie =

Gambian footballer (born 1999)

Personal information
- Date of birth: 22 August 1999 (age 27)
- Place of birth: Serekunda, The Gambia
- Height: 1.79 m (5 ft 10 in)
- Position: Left winger

Team information
- Current team: Jerv
- Number: 11

Youth career
- –2017: Blumenthaler SV
- 2018: Niendorfer TSV

Senior career*
Years	Team	Apps	(Gls)
2018–2019	VfL Oldenburg	21	(9)
2019–2021	Werder Bremen II	32	(16)
2021–2022	Werder Bremen	0	(0)
2021–2022	→ Hallescher FC (loan)	15	(0)
2022–2023	VfB Oldenburg	23	(3)
2024–2026	Raufoss	24	(6)
2026–	Jerv	25	(10)
- * Club domestic league appearances and goals as of 15 November 2026

Kebba Badjie (born 22 August 1999) is a Gambian professional footballer who plays as a left winger for Norwegian Second Division club Jerv.

== Career ==
Born in Serekunda, The Gambia, Badjie grew up in the country before fleeing to Germany aged 14. After playing youth football for Blumenthaler SV and Niendorfer TSV, he started his senior career at VfL Oldenburg in the Regionalliga Nord in 2018, whilst working in a warehouse. After nine goals in 21 games for VfL Oldenburg, he joined Werder Bremen II in summer 2019. He signed a professional contract with Werder Bremen in January 2021, and joined Hallescher FC in the 3. Liga on a year-long loan in summer 2021.

In June 2022 Badjie moved to VfB Oldenburg, newly promoted to the 3. Liga.

In March 2024, Badjie joined Norwegian First Division club Raufoss.
