= Paul Löhr =

German footballer

Personal information
- Full name: Paul Frederic Löhr
- Date of birth: 14 January 2001 (age 25)
- Place of birth: Kirn, Germany
- Height: 1.83 m (6 ft 0 in)
- Position: Goalkeeper

Youth career
- 2013–2021: Karlsruher SC

Senior career*
Years	Team	Apps	(Gls)
2021–2022	Karlsruher SC	1	(0)
- * Club domestic league appearances and goals as of 15 May 2022

Paul Frederic Löhr (born 14 January 2001) is a German professional footballer who plays as a goalkeeper.

== Early life ==
Löhr was born in Kirn.

== Career ==
Having joined the Karlsruher SC's academy in 2013, Löhr signed a contract until summer 2022 with the club in October 2020. He made his debut for the club as a late substitute in a 2–1 2. Bundesliga win over 1. FC Heidenheim on 23 May 2021. In June 2021, he suffered a tear of the meniscus and the cruciate ligament in the left knee, ruling him out for "at least eight months".
