= Fabrice Hartmann =

German footballer (born 2001)

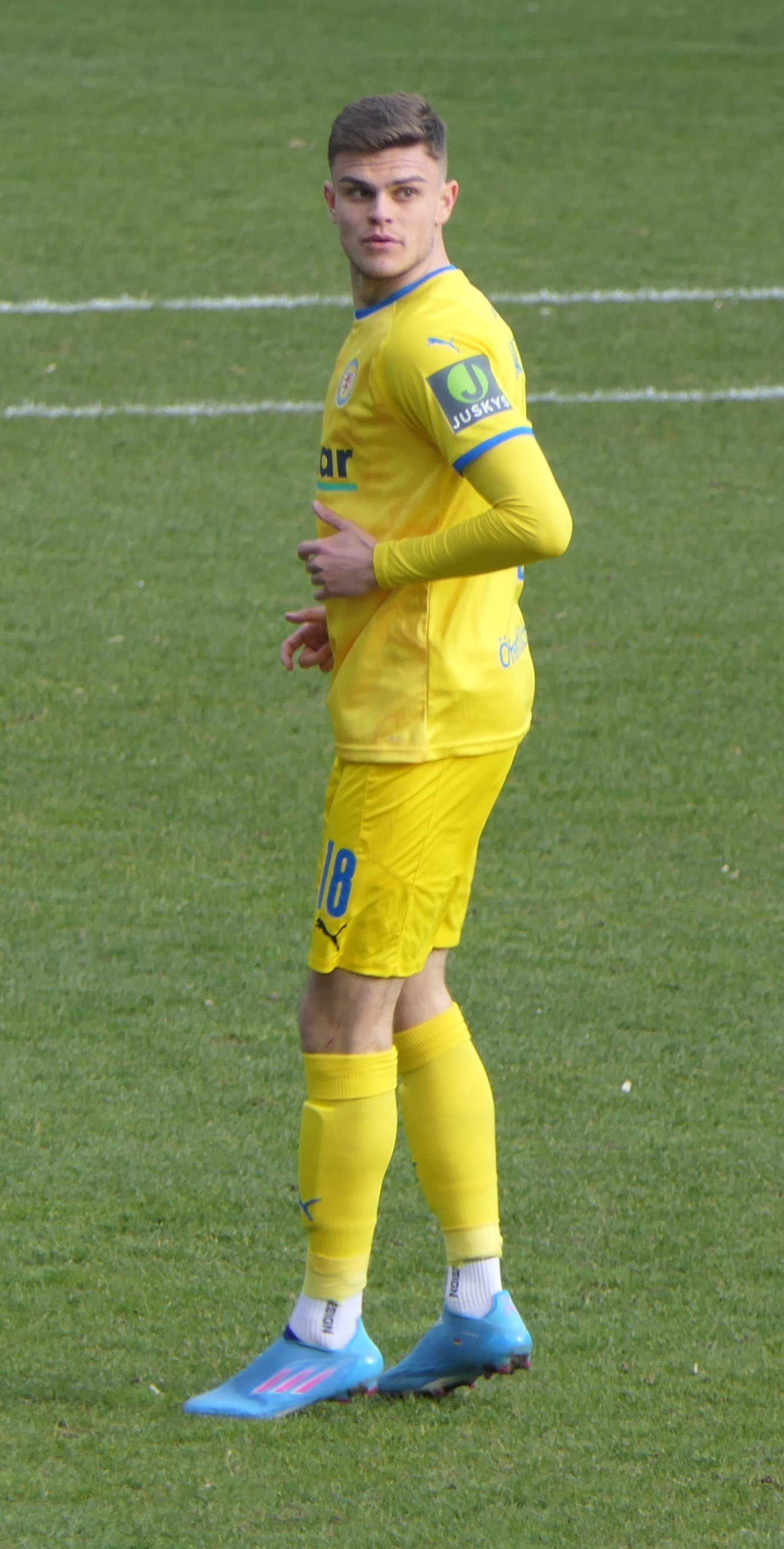

Personal information
- Full name: Fabrice Daniel Hartmann
- Date of birth: 2 March 2001 (age 25)
- Place of birth: Dessau, Germany
- Height: 1.78 m (5 ft 10 in)
- Positions: Winger; forward

Team information
- Current team: Hallescher FC
- Number: 18

Youth career
- –2012: SG Rot-Weiß Thalheim
- 2012–2020: RB Leipzig

Senior career*
Years	Team	Apps	(Gls)
2018–2024	RB Leipzig	0	(0)
2021–2022	→ SC Paderborn (loan)	2	(0)
2021–2022	→ SC Paderborn II (loan)	3	(0)
2022	→ Eintracht Braunschweig (loan)	6	(0)
2022–2023	→ Sligo Rovers (loan)	13	(3)
2023–2024	→ Sligo Rovers (loan)	31	(5)
2024–	Hallescher FC	53	(11)

International career^{‡}
2016	Germany U15	2	(2)
2016–2017	Germany U16	10	(4)
2017–2018	Germany U17	10	(2)
2019	Germany U18	1	(0)
2019	Germany U19	2	(0)
- * Club domestic league appearances and goals as of 23 September 2026 ‡ National team caps and goals as of 9 September 2019

Fabrice Daniel Hartmann (born 2 March 2001) is a German professional footballer who plays as a winger and forward for Regionalliga Nord club Hallescher FC.

== Club career ==
=== RB Leipzig ===
Hartmann made his professional debut for RB Leipzig on 26 July 2018, coming on as a substitute in the 89th minute for Matheus Cunha in the UEFA Europa League qualifying match against Swedish club BK Häcken of the Allsvenskan, which finished as a 4–0 home win.

On 28 January 2022, Hartmann was loaned to Eintracht Braunschweig until the end of the season.

==== Sligo Rovers loans ====
On 27 July 2022, he moved on loan to League of Ireland Premier Division club Sligo Rovers until 30 June 2023. It was announced on 12 August 2022 that Hartmann would not be available to play for the club in 2022 due to an 'administrative error' which saw his registration miss the deadline. He scored the first goal of his senior career on 6 March 2023 when he scored the final goal in a 2–1 win at home to St Patrick's Athletic. On 22 April 2023, he scored 2 goals in a 3–1 win over UCD. He scored 3 goals in 13 games during his loan spell, before it ended on 30 June 2023, when he returned to pre-season training with RB Leipzig. On 29 July 2023, Sligo Rovers announced they had re-signed Hartmann on loan until 30 June 2024.

=== Hallescher ===
On 31 August 2024, Hartmann's contract with RB Leipzig was terminated by mutual consent. 6 days later, on 5 September 2024, it was announced that he had signed for Regionalliga Nord side Hallescher FC.

== Career statistics ==
As of match played 23 September 2026

Appearances and goals by club, season and competition
Club	Season	League			National Cup		Continental		Total	
Club	Season	Division	Apps	Goals	Apps	Goals	Apps	Goals	Apps	Goals
RB Leipzig	2018–19	Bundesliga	0	0	0	0	1 (Note: Appearances in the UEFA Europa League)	0	1	0
SC Paderborn 07 (loan)	2021–22	2. Bundesliga	2	0	0	0	—		2	0
SC Paderborn 07 II (loan)	2021–22	Oberliga Westfalen	3	0	—		—		3	0
Eintracht Braunschweig (loan)	2021–22	3. Liga	6	0	0	0	—		6	0
Sligo Rovers (loan)	2022	LOI Premier Division	0	0	0	0	0	0	0	0
Sligo Rovers (loan)	2023	LOI Premier Division	13	3	—		—		13	3
Sligo Rovers (loan)	Total		13	3	0	0	0	0	13	3
Sligo Rovers (loan)	2023	LOI Premier Division	10	1	—		—		10	1
Sligo Rovers (loan)	2024	LOI Premier Division	21	4	—		—		21	4
Sligo Rovers (loan)	Total		31	5	—		—		31	5
Hallescher FC	2024–25	Regionalliga Nordost	23	7	0	0	—		23	7
Hallescher FC	2025–26	Regionalliga Nordost	21	4	0	0	—		21	4
Hallescher FC	2026–27	Regionalliga Nordost	9	0	1	0	—		10	0
Hallescher FC	Total		53	11	1	0	—		54	11
Career Total			109	19	1	0	1	0	111	19
