= Jannis Rabold =

German footballer

Personal information
- Date of birth: 27 March 2001 (age 25)
- Place of birth: Karlsruhe, Germany
- Height: 1.72 m (5 ft 8 in)
- Position: Right-back

Team information
- Current team: FC Nöttingen
- Number: 22

Youth career
- –2014: 1. SV Mörsch
- 2014–2020: Karlsruher SC

Senior career*
Years	Team	Apps	(Gls)
2020–2022	Karlsruher SC	8	(0)
2022–2023	Schweinfurt 05	26	(0)
2023–2024	ATSV Mutschelbach	17	(0)
2024–	FC Nöttingen	0	(0)

International career^{‡}
2016	Germany U15	2	(0)
2016–2017	Germany U16	5	(0)
- * Club domestic league appearances and goals as of 1 June 2024 ‡ National team caps and goals as of 17 December 2020

Jannis Rabold (born 27 March 2001) is a German footballer who plays as a right-back for FC Nöttingen.

== Career ==
Rabold made his professional debut for Karlsruher SC in the 2. Bundesliga on 17 December 2020, coming on as a substitute in the 89th minute for Marco Thiede against Erzgebirge Aue. The away match finished as a 1–4 loss for Karlsruhe.
