= 2019–20 SSV Jahn Regensburg season =

SSV Jahn Regensburg
2019–20 season
- Chairman: Hans Rothammer
- Coach: Mersad Selimbegović
- Stadium: Continental Arena
- 2. Bundesliga: 12th
- DFB-Pokal: First round
- Top goalscorer: League: Andreas Albers; Sebastian Stolze (8 each); All: Andreas Albers; Marco Grüttner; Sebastian Stolze (8 each)
- Highest home attendance: 15,210 vs. VfB Stuttgart and Hamburger SV (sell-out)
- Lowest home attendance: 7,804 vs. SV Wehen Wiesbaden
- Average home league attendance: 11421
- Biggest win: 5–0 vs. SV Wehen Wiesbaden
- Biggest defeat: 0–6 vs. Arminia Bielefeld
Home colours	Away colours	Third colours
- All statistics correct as of 17:01, 16 July 2020 (UTC).

The 2019–20 SSV Jahn Regensburg season is the 113th season in the club's football history. In 2019–20, the club played in the 2. Bundesliga, the second tier of German football. It is the club's third season back in this league after having won promotion from the 3. Liga in 2016–17.

The club also took part in the 2019–20 edition of the DFB-Pokal, the German Cup, but was eliminated in the first round.

== Events ==
At the end of the last season, manager Achim Beierlorzer left Regensburg and joined 1. FC Köln which were newly promoted to the Bundesliga. He was replaced by former assistant manager Mersad Selimbegović.

The season was interrupted by the COVID-19 pandemic after 25th matchday. After two months, in May 2020, the season was re-started with the match against Holstein Kiel. This match was held without attendance like all the following matches until the end of the season.

Regensburg could secure their place in the league with the victory over Karlsruher SC on 32nd matchday.

== Transfers ==
=== In ===
No.	Pos.	Name	Age	EU	Moving from	Type	Transfer Window	Contract ends	Transfer fee	Ref.
31	DF	Tom Baack	20	Yes	VfL Bochum	Free transfer	Summer	30 June 2022	None	
13	FW	Erik Wekesser	21	Yes	FC Astoria Walldorf	Free transfer	Summer	30 June 2022	None	
1	GK	Alexander Meyer	28	Yes	VfB Stuttgart	Free transfer	Summer	30 June 2021	None	
21	FW	Jan-Marc Schneider	25	Yes	FC St. Pauli	Free transfer	Summer	30 June 2021	None	
11	DF	Florian Heister	22	Yes	TSV Steinbach Haiger	Free transfer	Summer	30 June 2022	None	
36	DF	(England) Chima Okoroji	22	Yes	SC Freiburg	Loan	Summer	30 June 2020	N/A	
34	DF	Tim Knipping	26	Yes	SV Sandhausen	Free transfer	Summer	30 June 2022	Unknown	
7	MF	Max Besuschkow	22	Yes	Royale Union Saint-Gilloise	Transfer	Summer	30 June 2022	N/A	
19	FW	(Denmark) Andreas Albers	29	Yes	Viborg FF	Free transfer	Summer	30 June 2021	None	
23	FW	Nicolas Wähling	21	Yes	TSG 1899 Hoffenheim	Free transfer	Summer	30 June 2022	None	
5	DF	Benedikt Gimber	22	Yes	FC Ingolstadt 04	Transfer	Summer	30 June 2022	Unknown	
20	FW	Federico Palacios Martínez	24	Yes	1. FC Nürnberg	Transfer	Summer	30 June 2022	Unknown	
24	FW	Aaron Seydel	23	Yes	1. FSV Mainz 05	Loan	Winter	30 June 2020	None	
26	FW	Charalambos Makridis	22	Yes	Borussia Mönchengladbach II	Transfer	Winter	30 June 2023	Unknown	
30	GK	Kevin Kunz	27	Yes	Austria Lustenau	Transfer	Winter	30 June 2021	Unknown	

=== Out ===
No.	Pos.	Name	Age	EU	Moving to	Type	Transfer Window	Transfer fee	Ref.
23	FW	(Armenia) Sargis Adamyan	26	No	TSG 1899 Hoffenheim	Transfer	Summer	1.5 million €	
29	MF	Adrian Fein	20	Yes	Hamburger SV	Loan ended	Summer	N/A	
21	FW	Jonas Nietfeld	25	Yes	Hallescher FC	Released	Summer	None	
24	DF	(Turkey) Ali Odabas	25	No	FSV Zwickau	Released	Summer	None	
11	FW	Sebastian Freis	34	Yes		Retired	Summer	N/A	
19	DF	Jonas Föhrenbach	23	Yes	1. FC Heidenheim	Loan ended	Summer	N/A	
25	FW	Hamadi Al Ghaddioui	28	Yes	VfB Stuttgart	Transfer	Summer	300,000 €	
20	FW	(Kosovo) Albion Vrenezi	25	No	Würzburger Kickers	Loan	Summer	N/A	
1	GK	Philipp Pentke	34	Yes	TSG 1899 Hoffenheim	Released	Summer	None	
26	MF	André Dej	27	Yes	FC Viktoria Köln	Transfer	Summer	Unknown	
29	MF	Adrian Fein	20	Yes	Hamburger SV	Loan ended	Summer	N/A	
4	DF	(Denmark) Asger Sørensen	22	Yes	1. FC Nürnberg	Loan ended	Summer	N/A	
5	DF	Dominic Volkmer	23	Yes	FC Carl Zeiss Jena	Transfer	Summer	Unknown	
33	GK	André Weis	29	Yes	FC Viktoria Köln	Transfer	Winter	Unknown	
3	DF	Alexander Nandzik	26	Yes	1. FC Kaiserslautern	Loan	Winter	Unknown	

== Preseason and friendlies ==
Win Draw Loss Void

Date	Kickoff^{A}	Venue	City	Opponent	Res.^{B}	Att.	Goalscorers		Ref.
Date	Kickoff^{A}	Venue	City	Opponent	Res.^{B}	Att.	SSV Jahn Regensburg	Opponent	Ref.
28 June 2019	18:30		Wackersdorf	TV Wackersdorf	20–1	1,800	Wekesser 17', 28', 40'; Lais 17'; Derstroff 26'; Grüttner 30', 45'; Heister 50'; 53' (o.g.); Besuschkow 54'; Volkmer 56', 66', 80'; Saller 57'; Schneider 58'; George 74'; Palionis 76'; Geipl 82'; Stolze 85', 90+1'	Wilk 42'	
29 June 2019	11:00	ASV-Sportzentrum	Neumarkt	ASV Neumarkt	8–0	500	Nachreiner 11'; Hoffmann 22', 36'; Schneider 29'; Heister 32'; Grüttner 41', 43'; Stowasser 53'		
6 July 2019	15:00	Plattlinger Rennbahn	Plattling	SV Schalding-Heining	1–0		Derstroff 18'		
12 July 2019	17:00		Pleystein	Carl Zeiss Jena	4–3	550	Albers 26'; Schneider 62'; Stolze 66'; Grüttner 68'	Eckardt 16'; Skenderović 22', 45+1'	
13 July 2019	15:00		Ergolding	SpVgg Unterhaching	1–2		Schneider 84'	Schröter 61'; J.-P. Müller 76'	
17 July 2019	15:30		Zuzenhausen	TSG 1899 Hoffenheim	2–3		Grüttner 2', 34'	Hübner 52'; Akpoguma 90'; Stafylidis 105'	
21 July 2019	16:00		Heimstetten	1. FSV Mainz 05	2–1		Besuschkow 40'; Grüttner 49' (pen.)	Latza 68'	
5 September 2019	13:00	Am Sportplatz 1	Neustadt an der Waldnaab	FSV Zwickau	0–0				
10 October 2019			Fürth	SpVgg Greuther Fürth	2–0		Derstroff 16'; Albers 75'		
14 November 2019	14:00	Sportpark Unterhaching	Unterhaching	SpVgg Unterhaching	4–3		George 41'; Wekesser 41'; Palacios 72'; Stolze 82'	Schröter 12'; Stroh-Engel 21'; Hain 69'	
11 January 2020	14:00	Kaulbachweg	Regensburg	WSG Swarovski Tirol	3–1		Derstroff 60'; Albers 67'; Wekesser 68'	Rieder 38'	
17 January 2020	14:00		Ingolstadt	FC Ingolstadt 04	1–1	0	Wekesser 68'	Kaya 80' (pen.)	
18 January 2020	15:00		Würzburg	Würzburger Kickers	2–2	0	Besuschkow 39' (pen.); Okoroji 75'	Pfeiffer 8'; Herrmann 70'	
23 January 2020	13:00	Kaulbachweg	Regensburg	FC Blau-Weiß Linz	5–0		George 12'; Stolze 34'; Grüttner 72'; Palionis 100'; Wekesser 110'		

== 2. Bundesliga ==
=== 2. Bundesliga fixtures & results ===
Win Draw Loss Postponed

MD	Date Kickoff^{A}	H/A	Opponent	Res.^{B} F–A	Att.	Goalscorers		Table		Ref.
MD	Date Kickoff^{A}	H/A	Opponent	Res.^{B} F–A	Att.	SSV Jahn Regensburg	Opponent	Pos.	Pts.	Ref.
1	28 July 2019 15:30	H	VfL Bochum	3–1	10,268	Saller 42'; Stolze 50'; Baack 90+5'	Blum 76' (pen.)	1	3	
2	3 August 2019 15:30	A	Hannover 96	1–1	28,000	Albers 79'	Weydandt 66'	5	4	
3	18 August 2019 13:30	A	SpVgg Greuther Fürth	0–1	9,665		Green 74'	10	4	
4	24 August 2019 13:00	H	Arminia Bielefeld	1–3	9,514	Besuschkow 83'	Edmundsson 43'; Prietl 63'; Yabo 83'	13	4	
5	31 August 2019 13:00	A	Wehen Wiesbaden	5–0	3,857	Grüttner 34', 60', 76'; Kuhn 42' (o.g.); George 84'		8	7	
6	14 September 2019 13:00	H	VfB Stuttgart	2–3	15,210 (sell-out)	Besuschkow; Palacios 90+3'	González 24'; Badstuber 76'; Al Ghaddioui 90+2'	12	7	
7	22 September 2019 13:30	A	Dynamo Dresden	1–2	27,260	George 27'	Koné 55'; Ballas 89'	14	7	
8	28 September 2019 13:00	H	Hamburger SV	1–1	15,210 (sell-out)	Stolze 29'; Albers 85'	Nachreiner 72' (o.g.); Hunt 75'	13	8	
9	6 October 2019 13:30	A	Holstein Kiel	2–1	10,055	George 30'; Albers 87'	M. Baku 16'	10	11	
10	19 October 2019 13:00	H	SV Sandhausen	1–0	11,342	Grüttner 58'		5	14	
11	27 October 2019 13:30	A	1. FC Nürnberg	1–1	34,365	Schneider 90+4'	Behrens 38'	6	15	
12	1 November 2019 18:30	H	VfL Osnabrück	3–3	10,179	Schneider 34'; Grüttner 43'; Okoroji 53'	Álvarez 49'; Heyer 63', 72'	7	16	
13	10 November 2019 13:30	A	SV Darmstadt 98	2–2	13,350	Đumić 15' (o.g.); Albers 90+4'	Dursun 88', 90'	7	17	
14	24 November 2019 13:30	H	1. FC Heidenheim	3–1	11,762	Knipping 45+1'; Albers 74'; George 85'	Multhaup 62'	5	20	
15	29 November 2019 18:30	A	Karlsruher SC	1–4	12,454	Besuschkow 70'	Fink 17'; Hofmann 21', 56'; Wanitzek 90'	8	20	
16	8 December 2019 13:30	H	FC St. Pauli	1–0	15,026	Grüttner 42'		6	23	
17	13 December 2019 18:30	A	Erzgebirge Aue	0–1	8,300		Gonther 44'	8	23	
18	22 December 2019 13:30	A	VfL Bochum	3–2	18,679	Stolze 15', 64'; Albers 32'	Ganvoula 15', 64'; Losilla 83'	7	26	
19	28 January 2020 20:30	H	Hannover 96	1–0	8,418	Besuschkow 45+6' (pen.)		5	29	
20	31 January 2020 18:30	H	SpVgg Greuther Fürth	0–2	11,013		Wittek 11'; Nielsen 15'	7	29	
21	9 February 2020 13:30	A	Arminia Bielefeld	0–6	18,160		Soukou 15'; Edmundsson 35'; Prietl 65'; Correia 86' (o.g.); Yabo 87'; Brunner 90'	8	29	
22	15 February 2020 13:00	H	Wehen Wiesbaden	1–0	7.804	Wekesser 52'		6	32	
23	22 February 2020 13:00	A	VfB Stuttgart	0–2	46,924		Didavi 58'; Castro 59'	8	32	
24	28 February 2020 18:30	H	Dynamo Dresden	1–2	11,309	Wekesser 63'	Schmidt 70'; Makienok 77'	9	32	
25	7 March 2020 18:30	A	Hamburger SV	1–2	41,317	Grüttner 40'	Letschert 24'; Hunt 50'	10	32	
26	16 May 2020 13:00	H	Holstein Kiel	2–2	0	Stolze 75'; Albers 90+2' (pen.)	Lee 3'; Porath 58'	10	33	
27	23 May 2020 18:30	A	SV Sandhausen	0–0	0			10	34	
28	26 May 2020 18:30	H	1. FC Nürnberg	2–2	0	Albers 44'; Stolze 48'	Ishak 11'; Knipping 90+4' (o.g.)	11	35	
29	29 May 2020 18:30	A	VfL Osnabrück	2–2	0	Stolze 48'; Besuschkow 37' (pen.)	Álvarez 67', 70'	12	36	
30	6 June 2020 13:00	H	SV Darmstadt 98	3–0	0	Correia 7'; Besuschkow 52'; George 77'		12	39	
31	13 June 2020 13:00	A	1. FC Heidenheim	1–4	0	Seydel 75'	Leipertz 2'; Kleindienst 65', 81'; Schimmer 86'	12	39	
32	17 June 2020 18:30	H	Karlsruher SC	2–1	0	Wekesser 42'; Stolze 62'	Gueye 77'	10	42	
33	21 June 2020 15:30	A	FC St. Pauli	1–1	0	Hein 27'	Diamantakos 11'	10	43	
34	28 June 2020 15:30	H	Erzgebirge Aue	1–2	0	Makridis 2'	Testroet 45+3'; Zulechner 87'	12	43	

=== League table ===
Pos	Team	Pld	W	D	L	GF	GA	GD	Pts
10	SV Sandhausen	34	10	13	11	43	45	−2	43
11	Holstein Kiel	34	11	10	13	53	56	−3	43
12	Jahn Regensburg	34	11	10	13	50	56	−6	43
13	VfL Osnabrück	34	9	13	12	46	48	−2	40
14	FC St. Pauli	34	9	12	13	41	50	−9	39

Source: DFB
Rules for classification: 1) Points; 2) Goal difference; 3) Goals scored; 4) Head-to-head points; 5) Head-to-head goal difference; 6) Head-to-head away goals scored; 7) Away goals scored; 8) Play-off.

== DFB-Pokal ==
Win Draw Loss Postponed

RD	Date	Kickoff^{A}	Venue	City	Opponent	Result^{B}	Attendance	Goalscorers		Ref.
RD	Date	Kickoff^{A}	Venue	City	Opponent	Result^{B}	Attendance	SSV Jahn Regensburg	Opponent	Ref.
First round	11 August 2018	15:30	Hermann-Neuberger-Stadion	Völklingen	1. FC Saarbrücken	2–3	5,021	Besuschkow 64' (pen.); Grüttner 74'	Jurcher 53', 90+3'; Zeitz 76'	

== Player information ==
As of 27 June 2020.

No.	Pos	Nat	Player	Total		2. Liga		DFB-Pokal	
No.	Pos	Nat	Player	Apps	Goals	Apps	Goals	Apps	Goals
1	GK	(Germany) GER	Alexander Meyer	32	0	31	0	1	0
3	DF	(Germany) GER	Alexander Nandzik	3	0	3	0	0	0
5	DF	(Germany) GER	Benedikt Gimber	22	0	22	0	0	0
5	DF	(Germany) GER	Dominic Volkmer	2	0	1	0	1	0
6	DF	(Germany) GER	Benedikt Saller	29	1	28	1	1	0
7	MF	(Germany) GER	Max Besuschkow	33	7	32	6	1	1
8	MF	(Germany) GER	Andreas Geipl	26	0	25	0	1	0
9	FW	(Germany) GER	Jann George	28	5	27	5	1	0
10	FW	(Germany) GER	Julian Derstroff	11	1	11	1	0	0
11	DF	(Germany) GER	Florian Heister	9	0	9	0	0	0
13	FW	(Germany) GER	Erik Wekesser	28	3	28	3	0	0
14	DF	(Portugal) POR	Marcel Correia	31	1	31	1	0	0
15	FW	(Germany) GER	Marco Grüttner	33	8	32	7	1	1
16	DF	(Lithuania) LTU	Markus Palionis	3	0	2	0	1	0
17	MF	(Germany) GER	Oliver Hein	17	1	16	1	1	0
18	MF	(Germany) GER	Marc Lais	7	0	6	0	1	0
19	FW	(Denmark) DEN	Andreas Albers	34	8	33	8	1	0
20	FW	(Germany) GER	Federico Palacios Martínez	8	1	8	1	0	0
21	FW	(Germany) GER	Jan-Marc Schneider	14	2	13	2	1	0
22	FW	(Germany) GER	Sebastian Stolze	28	8	27	8	1	0
23	FW	(Germany) GER	Nicolas Wähling	3	0	3	0	0	0
24	FW	(Germany) GER	Aaron Seydel	9	1	9	1	0	0
26	FW	(Germany) GER	Charalambos Makridis	9	1	9	1	0	0
28	DF	(Germany) GER	Sebastian Nachreiner	30	0	30	0	0	0
30	GK	(Germany) GER	Kevin Kunz	0	0	0	0	0	0
31	DF	(Germany) GER	Tom Baack	4	1	4	1	0	0
32	GK	(Germany) GER	Alexander Weidinger	4	0	4	0	0	0
33	GK	(Germany) GER	André Weis	0	0	0	0	0	0
34	DF	(Germany) GER	Tim Knipping	15	1	15	1	0	0
36	DF	(England) ENG	Chima Okoroji	35	1	34	1	1	0

== Notes ==
A. Kickoff time in Central European Time/Central European Summer Time.
B. SSV Jahn Regensburg goals first.
