= 2020–21 SSV Jahn Regensburg season =

SSV Jahn Regensburg
2020–21 season
- Chairman: Hans Rothammer
- Coach: Mersad Selimbegović
- Stadium: Jahnstadion Regensburg
- 2. Bundesliga: 14th
- DFB-Pokal: Quarter-finals
- Top goalscorer: League: Andreas Albers (13 goals); All: Andreas Albers (13 goals)
- Biggest win: 3–0 vs. Eintracht Braunschweig
- Biggest defeat: 1–5 vs. VfL Bochum
Home colours	Away colours	Third colours
- All statistics correct as of 15:51, 26 June 2021 (UTC).

The 2020–21 SSV Jahn Regensburg season is the 114th season in the club's football history. This was the club's fourth consecutive season in the 2. Bundesliga, the second tier of German football, following promotion from the 3. Liga in 2016–17.

The club also competed in the 2020–21 edition of the DFB-Pokal.

== Events ==
On 26 February 2021, coach Mersad Selimbegović tested positive for COVID-19. He was quarantined and Regensburg had to play the match against SC Paderborn 07 without their head coach. They won the match 1–0. Two days after, several more players were tested positive for COVID-19 and the whole team was quarantined for two weeks and the DFB-Pokal quarter-final match against SV Werder Bremen had to be postponed. The following league matches against VfL Osnabrück and SpVgg Greuther Fürth had to be postponed, too.

== Transfers ==
=== In ===
No.	Pos	Player	Transferred from	Transfer Type	Fee	Date	Contract ends	Source
10	FW	Kaan Caliskaner	1. FC Köln II	Free transfer	None	1 July 2020	30 June 2023	
29	FW	André Becker	FC Astoria Walldorf	Free transfer	None	1 July 2020	30 June 2023	
4	DF	Jan-Niklas Beste	SV Werder Bremen	Loan	N/A	1 July 2020	30 June 2022	
33	DF	Jan Elvedi	SC Kriens	Free transfer	None	1 July 2020	30 June 2022	
24	DF	Scott Kennedy	Austria Klagenfurt	Free transfer	None	1 July 2020	30 June 2023	
18	MF	Christoph Moritz	Hamburger SV	Free transfer	None	1 July 2020	30 June 2022	
27	MF	Aaron Opoku	Hamburger SV	Loan	N/A	1 July 2020	30 June 2021	
14	FW	David Otto	TSG 1899 Hoffenheim	Loan	N/A	20 January 2021	30 June 2022	

=== Out ===
No.	Pos	Player	Transferred to	Transfer Type	Fee	Date	Source
8	MF	Andreas Geipl	1. FC Heidenheim	Free transfer	None	30 June 2020	
10	FW	Julian Derstroff	Hallescher FC	Free transfer	None	30 June 2020	
15	FW	Marco Grüttner	SGV Freiberg	Free transfer	None	30 June 2020	
24	FW	Aaron Seydel	1. FSV Mainz 05	Loan ended	N/A	30 June 2020	
36	DF	Chima Okoroji	SC Freiburg	Loan ended	N/A	30 June 2020	
34	DF	Tim Knipping	Dynamo Dresden	Transfer	Unknown	30 June 2020	
14	DF	Marcel Correia	SC Paderborn 07	Free transfer	None	30 June 2020	
18	MF	Marc Lais	SV Wehen Wiesbaden	Transfer	Unknown	30 June 2020	
20	FW	Federico Palacios Martínez	MSV Duisburg	Loan	N/A	30 June 2021	

== Pre-season and friendlies ==
Win Draw Loss Fixtures

Date	Kickoff^{A}	Venue	City	Opponent	Res.^{B}	Att.	Goalscorers		Ref.
Date	Kickoff^{A}	Venue	City	Opponent	Res.^{B}	Att.	SSV Jahn Regensburg	Opponent	Ref.
11 August 2020	17:00	Sportpark am Kaulbachweg	Regensburg	1. FC Nürnberg	0–1	0		Lohkemper 20'	
15 August 2020	16:00		Regensburg	Türkgücü München	0–0	0			
22 August 2020	15:00		Munich	TSV 1860 Munich	1–4	0	Besuschkow 44' (pen.)	Mölders 9'; Tallig 35'; Steinhart 57' (pen.); Moll 80' (pen.)	
29 August 2020	17:00		Heimstetten	FC Augsburg	1–1	0	Caliskaner 35'	Löwen 81' (pen.)	
1 September 2020				SpVgg Greuther Fürth	0–3	0		Abiama 58'; Nielsen 67'; Green 68'	
5 September 2020			Pasching	LASK	1–1	0	Albers 33'	Holland 51'	
6 September 2020			Regensburg	SK Vorwärts Steyr	4–1	0	Medineli 52'; Caliskaner 54', 61'; Wähling 87' (pen.)	Vojic 90'	
9 October 2020			Nuremberg	1. FC Nürnberg	0–2	0		Krauß 13' (pen.); Misidjan 16'	
11 November 2020	13:00		Würzburg	SV Darmstadt 98	3–3	0	Opoku 26'; Caliskaner 75'; Schneider 87'	Platte 17'; Honsak 39'; Schnellhardt 47'	
4 January 2021	15:00		Augsburg	FC Augsburg	0–1	0		Hahn 9'	

== 2. Bundesliga ==
=== Fixtures & results ===
Win Draw Loss Postponed

MD	Date Kickoff^{A}	H/A	Opponent	Res.^{B} F–A	Att.	Goalscorers		Table		Ref.
MD	Date Kickoff^{A}	H/A	Opponent	Res.^{B} F–A	Att.	SSV Jahn Regensburg	Opponent	Pos.	Pts.	Ref.
1	18 September 2020 18:30	H	1. FC Nürnberg	1–1	3,011	Besuschkow 58' (pen.)	Handwerker 43'	9	1	
2	26 September 2020 13:00	A	SV Darmstadt 98	0–0	1,721			13	2	
3	3 October 2020 13:00	H	Karlsruher SC	1–0	3,042	Albers 44'		7	5	
4	18 October 2020 13:30	A	Fortuna Düsseldorf	2–2	0	Albers 1'; Stolze 20'	Karaman 81'; Hennings 86'	5	6	
5	23 October 2020 18:30	H	Eintracht Braunschweig	3–0	0	Vrenezi 5', 70'; Besuschkow 61'		4	9	
6	31 October 2020 13:00	A	SC Paderborn 07	1–3	0	Albers 23'	Hünemeier 20', 79'; Terrazzino 62'	7	9	
7	8 November 2020 13:30	H	VfL Osnabrück	2–4	0	Albers 12'; Opoku 75'	Kerk 22', 41', 72'; Amenyido	8	9	
8	22 November 2020 13:30	A	SpVgg Greuther Fürth	1–3	0	Jaeckel 33' (o.g.)	Jaeckel 3'; Seguin 56'; Green 63'	13	9	
9	28 November 2020 13:00	H	Würzburger Kickers	2–1	0	Beste 83'; Stolze 88'	Hansen 90+2'	13	12	
10	6 December 2020 13:30	A	Erzgebirge Aue	2–0	0	Albers 8'; Stolze 40' (pen.)		9	15	
11	12 December 2020 13:00	H	Holstein Kiel	2–3	0	Vrenezi 17'; Beste 83'	Lee 32', 37'; Bartels 66'	11	15	
12	15 December 2020 18:30	A	1. FC Heidenheim	0–0	0			12	16	
13	18 December 2020 18:30	H	Hannover 96	0–0	0			13	17	
14	3 January 2021 13:30	A	Hamburger SV	1–3	0	Besuschkow 33'	Kinsombi 21'; Terodde 39'; Jatta 62'	14	17	
15	10 January 2021 13:30	H	VfL Bochum	0–2	0		Zoller 80'; Eisfeld 90+5'	14	17	
16	17 January 2021 13:30	H	SV Sandhausen	3–1	0	George 58', 68'; Stolze 63'	Keita-Ruel 6'	13	20	
17	24 January 2021 13:30	A	FC St. Pauli	0–2	0		Burgstaller 27'; Marmoush 49'	13	20	
18	27 January 2021 20:30	A	1. FC Nürnberg	1–0	0	Albers 88'		11	23	
10	30 January 2021 13:30	H	SV Darmstadt 98	1–1	0	Caliskaner 90+7'	Skarke 30'	11	24	
20	7 February 2021 13:30	A	Karlsruher SC	0–0	0			11	25	
21	13 February 2021 13:00	H	Fortuna Düsseldorf	1–1	0	Otto 39'	Karaman 52'	11	26	
22	19 February 2021 18:30	A	Eintracht Braunschweig	0–2	0		Nikolaou 58'; Proschwitz 65'	13	26	
23	26 February 2021 18:30	H	SC Paderborn 07	1–0	0	Stolze 53'		12	29	
24	14 April 2021 18:30	A	VfL Osnabrück	1–0	0	Albers 26' (pen.)		11	32	
25	17 March 2021 18:30	H	SpVgg Greuther Fürth	1–2	0	George 67'	Hrgota 13', 64'	12	32	
26	21 March 2021 13:30	A	Würzburger Kickers	1–1	0	Albers 75'	Munsy 22'	12	33	
27	4 April 2021 13:30	H	Erzgebirge Aue	1–1	0	George 5'	Gonther 85'	12	34	
28	13 May 2021 15:30	A	Holstein Kiel	2–3	0	Albers 16' (pen.); Vrenezi 75'	Bartels 20'; Lorenz 79'; Mühling 83'	13	34	
29	18 April 2021 13:30	H	1. FC Heidenheim	0–3	0		Thomalla 11'; Mainka 36'; Kleindienst 80' (pen.)	13	34	
30	21 April 2021 18:30	A	Hannover 96	1–3	0	Albers 57'	Haraguchi 1'; Weydandt 14'; Ducksch 82'	14	34	
31	25 April 2021 13:30	H	Hamburger SV	1–1	0	Albers 45'	Kittel 83'	14	35	
32	9 May 2021 13:30	A	VfL Bochum	1–5	0	Albers 26'	Tesche 29'; Beste 38' (o.g.); Holtmann 61'; Žulj 78'; Ganvoula 90+2' (pen.)	14	35	
33	16 May 2021 15:30	A	SV Sandhausen	0–2	0		Bachmann 5'; Behrens 42'	14	35	
34	23 May 2021 15:30	H	FC St. Pauli	3–0	0	George 14'; Albers 44'; Stolze 64'		14	38	

=== League table ===
Pos	Team	Pld	W	D	L	GF	GA	GD	Pts	Qualification or relegation
12	Erzgebirge Aue	34	12	8	14	44	53	−9	44	
13	Hannover 96	34	12	6	16	53	51	+2	42	
14	Jahn Regensburg	34	9	11	14	37	50	−13	38	
15	SV Sandhausen	34	10	4	20	41	60	−19	34	
16	VfL Osnabrück (R)	34	9	6	19	35	58	−23	33	Qualification for relegation play-offs

Source: DFB
Rules for classification: 1) Points; 2) Goal difference; 3) Goals scored; 4) Head-to-head points; 5) Head-to-head goal difference; 6) Head-to-head away goals scored; 7) Away goals scored; 8) Play-off.
(R) Relegated

== DFB-Pokal ==
Win Draw Loss Postponed

RD	Date	Kickoff^{A}	Venue	City	Opponent	Result^{B}	Attendance	Goalscorers		Ref.
RD	Date	Kickoff^{A}	Venue	City	Opponent	Result^{B}	Attendance	SSV Jahn Regensburg	Opponent	Ref.
First round	13 September 2020	15:30	Fritz-Walter-Stadion	Kaiserslautern	1. FC Kaiserslautern	1–1 (a.e.t.) (3–4 p)	0	Vrenezi 4'	Kraus 64'	
Second round	23 December 2020	20:45	Brita-Arena	Wiesbaden	SV Wehen Wiesbaden	0–0 (a.e.t.) (2–4 p)	0			
Round of 16	3 February 2021	20:45	Jahnstadion Regensburg	Regensburg	1. FC Köln	2–2 (a.e.t.) (4–3 p)	0	Kennedy 35'; George 44'	Jakobs 4'; Dennis 22'	
Quarter-final	7 April 2021	18:30	Jahnstadion Regensburg	Regensburg	SV Werder Bremen	0–1	0		Osako 52'	

== Statistics ==
As of 26 June 2021.

No.	Pos	Nat	Player	Total		2. Liga		DFB-Pokal	
No.	Pos	Nat	Player	Apps	Goals	Apps	Goals	Apps	Goals
1	GK	(Germany) GER	Alexander Meyer	37	0	33	0	4	0
4	DF	(Germany) GER	Jan-Niklas Beste	18	2	16	2	2	0
5	DF	(Germany) GER	Benedikt Gimber	25	0	22	0	3	0
6	MF	(Germany) GER	Benedikt Saller	30	0	27	0	3	0
7	MF	(Germany) GER	Max Besuschkow	35	3	32	3	3	0
8	MF	(Kosovo) KOS	Albion Vrenezi	31	5	27	4	4	1
9	MF	(Germany) GER	Jann George	28	6	25	5	3	1
10	FW	(Germany) GER	Kaan Caliskaner	36	1	32	1	4	0
11	DF	(Germany) GER	Florian Heister	11	0	10	0	1	0
13	FW	(Germany) GER	Erik Wekesser	34	0	30	0	4	0
14	FW	(Germany) GER	David Otto	19	1	17	1	2	0
16	DF	(Lithuania) LTU	Markus Palionis	7	0	6	0	1	0
17	MF	(Germany) GER	Oliver Hein	22	0	20	0	2	0
18	MF	(Germany) GER	Christoph Moritz	25	0	23	0	2	0
19	FW	(Denmark) DEN	Andreas Albers	38	13	34	13	4	0
20	FW	(Germany) GER	Federico Palacios Martínez	2	0	1	0	1	0
21	FW	(Germany) GER	Jan-Marc Schneider	18	0	17	0	1	0
22	MF	(Germany) GER	Sebastian Stolze	30	6	26	6	4	0
23	MF	(Germany) GER	Nicolas Wähling	2	0	1	0	1	0
24	DF	(Canada) CAN	Scott Kennedy	25	1	22	0	3	1
26	FW	(Germany) GER	Charalambos Makridis	15	0	13	0	2	0
27	MF	(Germany) GER	Aaron Opoku	22	1	21	1	1	0
28	DF	(Germany) GER	Sebastian Nachreiner	21	0	18	0	3	0
29	FW	(Germany) GER	André Becker	31	0	29	0	2	0
30	GK	(Germany) GER	Kevin Kunz	2	0	2	0	0	0
31	DF	(Germany) GER	Tom Baack	1	0	1	0	0	0
32	GK	(Germany) GER	Alexander Weidinger	0	0	0	0	0	0
33	DF	(Switzerland) SUI	Jan Elvedi	33	0	29	0	4	0
37	MF	(Germany) GER	Björn Zempelin	1	0	1	0	0	0
