= List of German football transfers summer 2019 =

This is a list of German football transfers in the summer transfer window 2019 by club. Only transfers of the Bundesliga, and 2. Bundesliga are included.

== Bundesliga ==
Note: Flags indicate national team as has been defined under FIFA eligibility rules. Players may hold more than one non-FIFA nationality.

=== FC Bayern Munich ===
In:

No.	Pos.	Nation	Player
5	DF	FRA	Benjamin Pavard (from VfB Stuttgart)
10	MF	BRA	Philippe Coutinho (on loan from FC Barcelona)
11	DF	FRA	Michaël Cuisance (from Borussia Moenchengladbach)
14	MF	CRO	Ivan Perisic (on loan from Inter Milan)
15	FW	GER	Fiete Arp (from Hamburger SV)
21	DF	FRA	Lucas Hernandez (from Atlético Madrid)

Out:

No.	Pos.	Nation	Player
5	DF	GER	Mats Hummels (to Borussia Dortmund)
7	MF	FRA	Franck Ribéry (released)
10	MF	NED	Arjen Robben (retired)
11	MF	COL	James Rodríguez (loan return to Real Madrid)
13	DF	BRA	Rafinha (to Flamengo)
20	FW	KOR	Jeong Woo-yeong (to SC Freiburg)
37	MF	GER	Meritan Shabani (to Wolverhampton Wanderers)
—	DF	AUT	Marco Friedl (to Werder Bremen, previously on loan)

=== Borussia Dortmund ===
In:

No.	Pos.	Nation	Player
9	FW	ESP	Paco Alcácer (from Barcelona, previously on loan)
14	DF	GER	Nico Schulz (from 1899 Hoffenheim)
15	DF	GER	Mats Hummels (from Bayern Munich)
19	MF	GER	Julian Brandt (from Bayer Leverkusen)
22	DF	ESP	Mateu Morey (from FC Barcelona Juvenil)
23	MF	BEL	Thorgan Hazard (from Borussia Mönchengladbach)

Out:

No.	Pos.	Nation	Player
4	DF	FRA	Abdou Diallo (to Paris Saint Germain)
14	FW	SWE	Alexander Isak (to Real Sociedad)
15	DF	GER	Jeremy Toljan (loan to Sassuolo Calcio)
17	MF	ESP	Sergio Gómez Martín (loan to SD Huesca)
18	MF	GER	Sebastian Rode (to Eintracht Frankfurt)
20	FW	GER	Maximilian Philipp (to FC Dynamo Moscow)
21	MF	GER	André Schürrle (loan to FC Spartak Moscow)
22	MF	USA	Christian Pulisic (loan return to Chelsea)
23	MF	JPN	Shinji Kagawa (to Real Zaragoza)
30	DF	GER	Felix Passlack (loan to Fortuna Sittard)
36	DF	TUR	Omer Toprak (loan to SV Werder Bremen)

=== RB Leipzig ===
In:

No.	Pos.	Nation	Player
17	MF	ENG	Ademola Lookman (from Everton)
18	MF	FRA	Christopher Nkunku (from Paris Saint-Germain)
19	MF	AUT	Hannes Wolf (from Red Bull Salzburg)
26	DF	WAL	Ethan Ampadu (on loan from Chelsea)
33	GK	GER	Philipp Tschauner (from Hannover 96)
36	DF	BRA	Luan Cândido (from Palmeiras B)

Out:

No.	Pos.	Nation	Player
7	FW	POR	Bruma (to PSV Eindhoven)
32	GK	GER	Julian Krahl (to 1. FC Köln)

=== Bayer 04 Leverkusen ===
In:

No.	Pos.	Nation	Player
8	DF	NED	Daley Sinkgraven (from AFC Ajax)
10	MF	GER	Kerem Demirbay (from 1899 Hoffenheim)
11	MF	GER	Nadiem Amiri (from 1899 Hoffenheim)
19	FW	FRA	Moussa Diaby (from Paris Saint-Germain)

Out:

No.	Pos.	Nation	Player
10	MF	GER	Julian Brandt (to Borussia Dortmund)
11	FW	SWE	Isaac Kiese Thelin (loan return to Anderlecht)
24	GK	GER	Thorsten Kirschbaum (to VVV-Venlo)

=== Borussia Mönchengladbach ===
In:

No.	Pos.	Nation	Player
10	FW	FRA	Marcus Thuram (from EA Guingamp)
18	DF	AUT	Stefan Lainer (from Red Bull Salzburg)
25	DF	ALG	Ramy Bensebaini (from Stade Rennes)
31	GK	GER	Max Grün (from Darmstadt 98)
36	FW	SUI	Breel Embolo (from FC Schalke 04)

Out:

No.	Pos.	Nation	Player
10	MF	BEL	Thorgan Hazard (to Borussia Dortmund)
27	MF	FRA	Michaël Cuisance (to FC Bayern Munich)
35	GK	GER	Moritz Nicolas (on loan to 1. FC Union Berlin)

=== VfL Wolfsburg ===
In:

No.	Pos.	Nation	Player
19	DF	SUI	Kevin Mbabu (from Young Boys)
40	FW	BRA	João Victor (from LASK Linz)
6	DF	BRA	Paulo Otávio (from FC Ingolstadt 04)
24	MF	AUT	Xaver Schlager (from Red Bull Salzburg)

Out:

No.	Pos.	Nation	Player
3	DF	NED	Paul Verhaegh (to FC Twente)
34	MF	GER	Marvin Stefaniak (on loan to Greuther Fürth)
35	DF	GER	Gian-Luca Itter (to SC Freiburg)
—	FW	BEL	Landry Dimata (to Anderlecht, previously on loan)
—	MF	GER	Paul Seguin (to Greuther Fürth, previously on loan)

=== Eintracht Frankfurt ===
In:

No.	Pos.	Nation	Player
8	FW	SRB	Luka Jović (from Benfica, previously on loan)
10	MF	SRB	Filip Kostić (from Hamburger SV, previously on loan)
7	FW	SRB	Dejan Joveljić (from Red Star Belgrade)
8	MF	SUI	Djibril Sow (From Young Boys)
25	DF	GER	Erik Durm (from Huddersfield Town)
28	MF	GER	Dominik Kohr (from Bayer Leverkusen)
17	MF	GER	Sebastian Rode (from Borussia Dortmund)

Out:

No.	Pos.	Nation	Player
8	FW	SRB	Luka Jović (to Real Madrid)
9	FW	FRA	Sébastien Haller (to West Ham United)
15	DF	NED	Jetro Willems (on loan to Newcastle United)
25	MF	GER	Patrice Kabuya (to Hamburger SV II)
34	FW	SWE	Branimir Hrgota (released)
—	DF	ECU	Andersson Ordóñez (to L.D.U. Quito, previously on loan)
—	FW	GER	Danny Blum (to VfL Bochum, previously on loan at Las Palmas)
—	DF	GER	Noel Knothe (released, previously on loan at FC Pipinsried)

=== Werder Bremen ===
In:

No.	Pos.	Nation	Player
32	DF	AUT	Marco Friedl (from Bayern Munich, previously on loan)
—	FW	GER	Niclas Füllkrug (from Hannover 96)
—	MF	GER	Benjamin Goller (from FC Schalke 04)

Out:

No.	Pos.	Nation	Player
4	DF	GER	Robert Bauer (to Arsenal Tula)
—	DF	GER	Luca-Milan Zander (to FC St. Pauli, previously on loan)

=== 1899 Hoffenheim ===
In:

No.	Pos.	Nation	Player
5	DF	GRE	Kostas Stafylidis (from FC Augsburg)
9	FW	TOG	Ihlas Bebou (from Hannover 96)
16	MF	GER	Sebastian Rudy (on loan from FC Schalke 04)
23	FW	ARM	Sargis Adamyan (from Jahn Regensburg)

Out:

No.	Pos.	Nation	Player
10	MF	GER	Kerem Demirbay (to Bayer Leverkusen)
16	DF	GER	Nico Schulz (to Borussia Dortmund)
18	MF	GER	Nadiem Amiri (to Bayer Leverkusen)
26	FW	GER	David Otto (on loan to 1. FC Heidenheim)
37	FW	GER	Robin Hack (to 1. FC Nürnberg)
34	FW	BRA	Joelinton (to Newcastle United)
—	GK	SUI	Gregor Kobel (on loan to VfB Stuttgart, previously on loan at FC Augsburg)

=== Fortuna Düsseldorf ===
In:

No.	Pos.	Nation	Player
18	MF	GER	Thomas Pledl (from FC Ingolstadt 04)
24	GK	USA	Zack Steffen (on loan from Manchester City)
27	FW	POL	Dawid Kownacki (on loan from Sampdoria)
29	DF	AUT	Markus Suttner (from Brighton & Hove Albion, previously on loan)
33	GK	GER	Florian Kastenmeier (from VfB Stuttgart II)
34	MF	ENG	Lewis Baker (on loan from Chelsea)
37	FW	GHA	Bernard Tekpetey (on loan from FC Schalke 04)

Out:

No.	Pos.	Nation	Player
9	FW	BEL	Benito Raman (to FC Schalke 04)
20	FW	BEL	Dodi Lukebakio (loan return to Watford, later sold to Hertha BSC)
33	FW	JPN	Takashi Usami (loan return to FC Augsburg)

=== Hertha BSC ===
In:

No.	Pos.	Nation	Player
7	MF	GER	Eduard Löwen (from 1. FC Nürnberg)
20	DF	BEL	Dedryck Boyata (from Celtic)
28	FW	BEL	Dodi Lukebakio (from Watford, previously on loan at Fortuna Düsseldorf)

Out:

No.	Pos.	Nation	Player
20	MF	AUT	Valentino Lazaro (to Inter Milan)
28	MF	SUI	Fabian Lustenberger (to Young Boys)
35	GK	GER	Marius Gersbeck (to Karlsruher SC)
36	MF	GER	Julius Kade (to 1. FC Union Berlin)

=== 1. FSV Mainz 05 ===
In:

No.	Pos.	Nation	Player
2	DF	FRA	Ronaël Pierre-Gabriel (from Monaco)
3	DF	ESP	Aarón Martín (from Espanyol, previously on loan)
4	DF	NED	Jerry St. Juste (from Feyenoord)
11	FW	KOR	Ji Dong-won (from FC Augsburg)
17	DF	GER	Jonathan Meier (from Bayern Munich II)
20	MF	SUI	Edimilson Fernandes (from West Ham United, previously on loan at Fiorentina)
22	FW	NGR	Taiwo Awoniyi (on loan from Liverpool)
30	FW	GER	Cyrill Akono (from Preußen Münster)
33	GK	ISR	Omer Hanin (from Hapoel Hadera)

Out:

No.	Pos.	Nation	Player
1	GK	GER	René Adler (retired)
20	FW	NGR	Anthony Ujah (to 1. FC Union Berlin)
25	MF	CIV	Jean-Philippe Gbamin (to Everton)
26	DF	GER	Niko Bungert (retired)
28	FW	GHA	Abass Issah (on loan to FC Utrecht)
33	GK	GER	Jannik Huth (to SC Paderborn 07)
38	MF	GER	Gerrit Holtmann (to SC Paderborn 07)

=== SC Freiburg ===
In:

No.	Pos.	Nation	Player
7	MF	FRA	Jonathan Schmid (from FC Augsburg)
24	DF	GER	Gian-Luca Itter (from VfL Wolfsburg)
28	MF	KOR	Kwon Chang-hoon (from Dijon FCO)
29	FW	KOR	Jeong Woo-yeong (from FC Bayern Munich)

Out:

No.	Pos.	Nation	Player
7	FW	GER	Florian Niederlechner (to FC Augsburg)
15	DF	GER	Pascal Stenzel (on loan to VfB Stuttgart)
31	DF	GER	Keven Schlotterbeck (on loan to 1. FC Union Berlin)
37	GK	GER	Constantin Frommann (on loan to SG Sonnenhof Großaspach)
—	DF	GER	Jonas Föhrenbach (to 1. FC Heidenheim, previously on loan at Jahn Regensburg)
--	FW	GER	Fabian Schleusener (to 1. FC Nürnberg, previously on loan at SV Sandhausen)

=== FC Schalke 04 ===
In:

No.	Pos.	Nation	Player
4	DF	TUR	Ozan Kabak (from VfB Stuttgart)
9	FW	BEL	Benito Raman (from Fortuna Düsseldorf)
--	FW	GHA	Bernard Tekpetey (from SC Paderborn 07)
20	DF	ENG	Jonjoe Kenny (on loan from Everton)
23	GK	GER	Markus Schubert (from Dynamo Dresden)

Out:

No.	Pos.	Nation	Player
1	GK	GER	Ralf Fährmann (on loan to Norwich City F.C.)
21	DF	GER	Sascha Riether (retired)
23	FW	GER	Cedric Teuchert (on loan to Hannover 96)
36	FW	SUI	Breel Embolo (to Borussia Mönchengladbach)
39	MF	GER	Benjamin Goller (to Werder Bremen)
—	FW	GHA	Bernard Tekpetey (on loan to Fortuna Düsseldorf)

=== FC Augsburg ===
In:

No.	Pos.	Nation	Player
3	FW	DEN	Mads Valentin (from FC Nordsjælland)
5	DF	CZE	Marek Suchy (from FC Basel)
7	FW	GER	Florian Niederlechner (from SC Freiburg)
16	FW	SUI	Ruben Vargas (from FC Luzern)
17	FW	NGR	Noah Sarenren Bazee (from Hannover 96)
21	GK	CZE	Tomas Koubek (from Stade Rennes)
22	DF	BRA	Iago (from Sport Club Internacional)
25	MF	ECU	Carlos Gruezo (from FC Dallas)
36	DF	ENG	Reece Oxford (from West Ham United)
--	DF	SUI	Stephan Lichtsteiner (from Free Agent)

Out:

No.	Pos.	Nation	Player
3	DF	GRE	Kostas Stafylidis (to 1899 Hoffenheim)
17	MF	FRA	Jonathan Schmid (to SC Freiburg)
22	FW	KOR	Ji Dong-won (to Mainz 05)
36	DF	AUT	Martin Hinteregger (to Eintracht Frankfurt, previously on loan)
38	DF	AUT	Kevin Danso (on loan to Southampton FC)
40	GK	SUI	Gregor Kobel (loan return to TSG Hoffenheim)
--	FW	GER	Julian Günther-Schmidt (to FC Carl Zeiss Jena, previously on loan)
--	FW	JPN	Takashi Usami (to Gamba Osaka, previously on loan at Fortuna Düsseldorf)

=== 1. FC Köln ===
In:

No.	Pos.	Nation	Player
—	MF	GHA	Kingsley Schindler (from Holstein Kiel)
—	GK	GER	Julian Krahl (from RB Leipzig)
—	DF	NED	Kingsley Ehizibue (from PEC Zwolle)
--	MF	BEL	Birger Verstraete (from K.A.A. Gent)
--	MF	BEL	Sebastiaan Bornauw (from R.S.C. Anderlecht)

Out:

No.	Pos.	Nation	Player
28	GK	GER	Jan-Christoph Bartels (on loan to SV Wehen Wiesbaden)
—	FW	FRA	Serhou Guirassy (to Amiens, previously on loan)

=== SC Paderborn 07 ===
In:

No.	Pos.	Nation	Player
—	FW	GER	Streli Mamba (from Energie Cottbus)
—	DF	GER	Luca Kilian (from Borussia Dortmund II)
—	GK	GER	Jannik Huth (from Mainz 05)
—	FW	GER	Johannes Dörfler (from KFC Uerdingen 05)
—	MF	GER	Marcel Hilßner (from Hansa Rostock)
—	MF	BIH	Rifet Kapić (from Grasshoppers, previously on loan at Sarajevo)
—	MF	BRA	Cauly (from MSV Duisburg)
--	MF	GER	Gerrit Holtmann (from 1. FSV Mainz 05)
—	DF	GER	Jan-Luca Rumpf (from Sportfreunde Siegen)

Out:

No.	Pos.	Nation	Player
12	DF	GER	Felix Herzenbruch (to Rot-Weiss Essen)
21	MF	GER	Philipp Klement (to VfB Stuttgart)
33	DF	GER	Lukas Boeder (to MSV Duisburg)
37	FW	GHA	Bernard Tekpetey (to FC Schalke 04)
—	FW	GER	Luca Pfeiffer (to Würzburger Kickers, previously on loan at VfL Osnabrück)
--	FW	GER	Phillip Tietz (to SV Wehen Wiesbaden, previously on loan at FC Carl Zeiss Jena)
--	FW	GER	Julius Düker (to SV Meppen, previously on loan at Eintracht Braunschweig)

=== 1. FC Union Berlin ===
In:

No.	Pos.	Nation	Player
20	FW	NGR	Suleiman Abdullahi (from Eintracht Braunschweig, previously on loan)
—	MF	AUT	Florian Flecker (from TSV Hartberg)
—	MF	GER	Julius Kade (from Hertha BSC)
—	GK	GER	Moritz Nicolas (on loan from Borussia Mönchengladbach)
--	DF	GER	Keven Schlotterbeck (on loan from SC Freiburg)
--	FW	NED	Sheraldo Becker (from ADO Den Haag)
--	FW	GER	Laurenz Dehl (from 1. FC Union Berlin youth)
--	MF	GER	Maurice Opfermann (from 1. FC Union Berlin youth)
--	FW	NGR	Anthony Ujah (from 1. FSV Mainz 05)
--	MF	GER	Robert Andrich (from 1. FC Heidenheim)
--	FW	DEN	Marcus Ingvartsen (from K.R.C. Genk)
--	MF	GER	Christian Gentner (from VfB Stuttgart)
--	FW	GER	Marius Bülter (on loan from 1. FC Magdeburg)
--	DF	SRB	Neven Subotić (from AS Saint-Étienne)

Out:

No.	Pos.	Nation	Player
17	FW	POR	Carlos Mané (loan return to Sporting CP)
30	GK	GER	Lennart Moser (on loan to FC Energie Cottbus)
31	MF	GER	Berkan Taz (on loan to FC Energie Cottbus)
--	DF	GER	Peter Kurzweg (to FC Ingolstadt 04, previously on loan at Würzburger Kickers)

== 2. Bundesliga ==
=== VfB Stuttgart ===
In:

No.	Pos.	Nation	Player
1	GK	SUI	Gregor Kobel (on loan from TSG Hoffenheim, previously on loan at FC Augsburg)
3	MF	JPN	Wataru Endo (on loan from Sint-Truidense V.V.)
5	DF	ENG	Nathaniel Phillips (on loan from Liverpool F.C.)
7	FW	FRA	Tanguy Coulibaly (from Paris Saint-Germain F.C.)
9	FW	AUT	Saša Kalajdžić (from FC Admira Wacker Mödling)
14	FW	COD	Silas (from Paris FC)
15	DF	GER	Pascal Stenzel (on loan from SC Freiburg)
16	MF	GER	Atakan Karazor (from Holstein Kiel)
17	DF	GER	Maxime Awoudja (from FC Bayern Munich II)
18	FW	GER	Hamadi Al Ghaddioui (from Jahn Regensburg)
21	MF	GER	Philipp Klement (from SC Paderborn 07)
31	MF	ARG	Mateo Klimowicz (from Instituto Atlético Central Córdoba)
33	GK	GER	Fabian Bredlow (from 1. FC Nürnberg)

Out:

No.	Pos.	Nation	Player
3	DF	GER	Dennis Aogo (released)
18	DF	TUR	Ozan Kabak (to FC Schalke 04)
20	MF	GER	Christian Gentner (to 1. FC Union Berlin)
21	DF	FRA	Benjamin Pavard (to Bayern Munich)
26	GK	GER	Alexander Meyer (to Jahn Regensburg)
29	MF	POL	David Kopacz (on loan to Górnik Zabrze)
32	DF	GER	Andreas Beck (to K.A.S. Eupen)
37	DF	BRA	Ailton (on loan to Qarabağ FK, previously on loan at S.C. Braga)
—	MF	SUI	Anto Grgić (to FC Sion, previously on loan)
—	MF	TUR	Berkay Özcan (to Hamburger SV, previously on loan)
—	MF	GHA	Hans Nunoo Sarpei (to Greuther Fürth, previously on loan)

=== Hannover 96 ===
In:

No.	Pos.	Nation	Player
19	FW	SWE	Emil Hansson (from Feyenoord)
33	FW	GER	Cedric Teuchert (on loan from FC Schalke 04)

Out:

No.	Pos.	Nation	Player
8	MF	BRA	Walace (to Udinese)
13	FW	TOG	Ihlas Bebou (to 1899 Hoffenheim)
24	FW	GER	Niclas Füllkrug (to Werder Bremen)
25	DF	GER	Oliver Sorg (to 1. FC Nürnberg)
27	MF	SUI	Pirmin Schwegler (to Western Sydney Wanderers)
37	FW	NGR	Noah Sarenren Bazee (to FC Augsburg)
—	MF	GER	Mike-Steven Bähre (to Barnsley, previously on loan)

=== 1. FC Nürnberg ===
In:

No.	Pos.	Nation	Player
—	FW	GER	Felix Lohkemper (from 1. FC Magdeburg)
—	DF	GER	Oliver Sorg (from Hannover 96)
—	FW	GER	Robin Hack (from 1899 Hoffenheim)
--	FW	GER	Fabian Schleusener (from SC Freiburg, previously on loan at SV Sandhausen)

Out:

No.	Pos.	Nation	Player
1	GK	GER	Fabian Bredlow (to VfB Stuttgart)
17	MF	GER	Eduard Löwen (to Hertha BSC)

=== Hamburger SV ===
In:

No.	Pos.	Nation	Player
1	GK	POR	Daniel Heuer Fernandes (from Darmstadt 98)
2	DF	GER	Jan Gyamerah (from VfL Bochum)
6	MF	GER	David Kinsombi (from Holstein Kiel)
8	MF	GER	Jeremy Dudziak (from FC St. Pauli)
16	FW	AUT	Lukas Hinterseer (from VfL Bochum)
25	DF	NED	Timo Letschert (from Sassuolo)
41	MF	TUR	Berkay Özcan (from VfB Stuttgart, previously on loan)

Out:

No.	Pos.	Nation	Player
5	DF	SCO	David Bates (on loan to Sheffield Wednesday)
6	DF	BRA	Douglas (to Zenit)
10	FW	GER	Pierre-Michel Lasogga (to Al-Arabi)
15	FW	GER	Fiete Arp (to Bayern Munich)
—	MF	SRB	Filip Kostić (to Eintracht Frankfurt, previously on loan)

=== 1. FC Heidenheim ===
In:

No.	Pos.	Nation	Player
—	DF	GER	Oliver Hüsing (from Hansa Rostock)
—	FW	GER	David Otto (on loan from 1899 Hoffenheim)
—	DF	GER	Jonas Föhrenbach (from SC Freiburg, previously on loan at Jahn Regensburg)

Out:

No.	Pos.	Nation	Player
8	MF	GER	Robert Andrich (to 1. FC Union Berlin)
9	FW	GER	Robert Glatzel (to Cardiff City)
38	MF	GER	Tim Skarke (from Darmstadt 98)
39	GK	GER	Matthias Köbbing (to FC 08 Homburg)

=== Holstein Kiel ===
In:

No.	Pos.	Nation	Player
—	FW	GER	Daniel Hanslik (from VfL Wolfsburg II)
—	DF	KOR	Seo Young-jae (from MSV Duisburg)
—	DF	GER	Phil Neumann (from FC Ingolstadt 04)
—	MF	GER	Lion Lauberbach (from FSV Zwickau)
—	FW	GER	Makana Baku (from Sonnenhof Großaspach)
—	GK	GRE	Ioannis Gelios (from Hansa Rostock)

Out:

No.	Pos.	Nation	Player
2	DF	GER	Arne Sicker (to MSV Duisburg)
6	MF	GER	David Kinsombi (to Hamburger SV)
22	MF	GER	Atakan Karazor (to VfB Stuttgart)
27	MF	GHA	Kingsley Schindler (to 1. FC Köln)

=== Arminia Bielefeld ===
In:

No.	Pos.	Nation	Player
—	GK	HUN	Ágoston Kiss (on loan from Haladás)
—	FW	BEN	Cebio Soukou (from Hansa Rostock)

Out:

No.	Pos.	Nation	Player
—	FW	GER	Leandro Putaro (to Eintracht Braunschweig, previously on loan)

=== Jahn Regensburg ===
In:

No.	Pos.	Nation	Player
—	DF	GER	Tom Baack (from VfL Bochum)
—	FW	GER	Erik Wekesser (from Astoria Walldorf)
—	GK	GER	Alexander Meyer (from VfB Stuttgart)
—	FW	GER	Jan-Marc Schneider (from FC St. Pauli)
—	DF	GER	Florian Heister (from Steinbach Haiger)

Out:

No.	Pos.	Nation	Player
11	FW	GER	Sebastian Freis (retired)
19	DF	GER	Jonas Föhrenbach (loan return to SC Freiburg)
21	FW	GER	Jonas Nietfeld (to Hallescher FC)
23	FW	ARM	Sargis Adamyan (to 1899 Hoffenheim)
24	DF	TUR	Ali Odabas (to FSV Zwickau)
25	FW	GER	Hamadi Al Ghaddioui (to VfB Stuttgart)

=== FC St. Pauli ===
In:

No.	Pos.	Nation	Player
19	DF	GER	Luca-Milan Zander (from Werder Bremen, previously on loan)
—	MF	GER	Rico Benatelli (from Dynamo Dresden)
—	FW	UKR	Borys Tashchy (from MSV Duisburg)

Out:

No.	Pos.	Nation	Player
8	MF	GER	Jeremy Dudziak (to Hamburger SV)
20	MF	GER	Richard Neudecker (to VVV-Venlo)
29	FW	GER	Jan-Marc Schneider (to Jahn Regensburg)
35	DF	GER	Brian Koglin (to 1. FC Magdeburg)
—	MF	GER	Maurice Litka (to Preußen Münster, previously on loan at KFC Uerdingen 05)

=== SV Darmstadt 98 ===
In:

No.	Pos.	Nation	Player
—	MF	GER	Erich Berko (from Dynamo Dresden)
—	DF	ENG	Mandela Egbo (from Borussia Mönchengladbach II)
—	GK	GER	Marcel Schuhen (from SV Sandhausen)
—	MF	GER	Tim Skarke (from 1. FC Heidenheim)
—	FW	GER	Braydon Manu (from Hallescher FC)

Out:

No.	Pos.	Nation	Player
1	GK	POR	Daniel Heuer Fernandes (to Hamburger SV)
38	GK	GER	Max Grün (to Borussia Mönchengladbach)
—	DF	DEN	Patrick Banggaard (to SønderjyskE, previously on loan at Pafos)

=== VfL Bochum ===
In:

No.	Pos.	Nation	Player
4	DF	GER	Simon Lorenz (loan return from TSV 1860 Munich)
5	DF	SUI	Saulo Decarli (from Club Brugge)
6	DF	ENG	Jordi Osei-Tutu (on loan from Arsenal F.C.)
15	DF	GER	Maxwell Gyamfi (from VfL Bochum youth)
17	FW	GER	Danny Blum (from Eintracht Frankfurt, previously on loan at Las Palmas)
25	GK	GER	Patrick Drewes (from Würzburger Kickers)
28	FW	GER	Ulrich Bapoh (loan return from FC Twente)
35	FW	CGO	Silvère Ganvoula (from R.S.C. Anderlecht, previously on loan)

Out:

No.	Pos.	Nation	Player
2	DF	GER	Tim Hoogland (to Melbourne Victory FC)
13	MF	GER	Sidney Sam (released)
16	FW	AUT	Lukas Hinterseer (to Hamburger SV)
17	MF	AUS	Robbie Kruse (to Melbourne Victory FC)
18	DF	GER	Jan Gyamerah (to Hamburger SV)
25	MF	GER	Jannik Bandowski (to SpVgg Unterhaching)
30	FW	AZE	Baris Ekincier (on loan to SK Austria Klagenfurt)
31	DF	GER	Tom Baack (to Jahn Regensburg)
32	GK	GER	Felix Dornebusch (released)
40	GK	GER	Joshua Wehking (to Hamburger SV II)
—	FW	GRE	Vangelis Pavlidis (to Willem II Tilburg, previously on loan)

=== Dynamo Dresden ===
In:

No.	Pos.	Nation	Player
15	DF	GER	Chris Löwe (from Huddersfield Town)
17	MF	GER	René Klingenburg (from Preußen Münster)
—	GK	GER	Kevin Broll (from Sonnenhof Großaspach)

Out:

No.	Pos.	Nation	Player
1	GK	GER	Markus Schubert (to FC Schalke 04)
8	MF	GER	Rico Benatelli (to FC St. Pauli)
35	MF	GER	Marius Hauptmann (to FSV Zwickau)
40	MF	GER	Erich Berko (to Darmstadt 98)
—	FW	TOG	Peniel Mlapa (to VVV-Venlo, previously on loan)

=== SpVgg Greuther Fürth ===
In:

No.	Pos.	Nation	Player
14	MF	GHA	Hans Nunoo Sarpei (from VfB Stuttgart, previously on loan)
18	DF	GER	Marco Meyerhöfer (from Waldhof Mannheim)
33	MF	GER	Paul Seguin (from VfL Wolfsburg, previously on loan)
—	MF	GER	Marvin Stefaniak (on loan from VfL Wolfsburg)
—	DF	GER	Alexander Lungwitz (from Bayern Munich Youth)
—	FW	GER	Robin Kehr (from Borussia Dortmund Youth Sector)

Out:

No.	Pos.	Nation	Player
18	MF	GER	Benedikt Kirsch (to Türkgücü-Ataspor München)
22	DF	CRO	Mario Maloča (to Lechia Gdańsk)

=== Erzgebirge Aue ===
In:

No.	Pos.	Nation	Player
—	MF	TUR	Hikmet Çiftçi (from 1. FC Köln II)

Out:

No.	Pos.	Nation	Player
—	DF	GER	Luke Hemmerich (to Würzburger Kickers, previously on loan at Energie Cottbus)

=== SV Sandhausen ===
In:

No.	Pos.	Nation	Player
1	GK	AUT	Martin Fraisl (from FC Botoșani)
5	MF	GER	Marlon Frey (from Jong PSV)
7	MF	GER	Philip Türpitz (from 1. FC Magdeburg)
8	FW	GER	Mario Engels (from Roda JC Kerkrade)
10	FW	GER	Julius Biada (from 1. FC Kaiserslautern)
11	FW	MAR	Aziz Bouhaddouz (from Al-Batin)
27	MF	GER	Robin Scheu (from Fortuna Köln)
29	MF	CRO	Ivan Paurević (from Ufa)

Out:

No.	Pos.	Nation	Player
1	GK	GER	Marcel Schuhen (to Darmstadt 98)
7	FW	USA	Andrew Wooten (to Philadelphia Union)
8	MF	TUN	Mohamed Gouaida (to Waldhof Mannheim)
11	FW	GER	Fabian Schleusener (loan return to SC Freiburg)
22	DF	GER	Korbinian Vollmann (to Hansa Rostock)

=== VfL Osnabrück ===
In:

No.	Pos.	Nation	Player
—	MF	GER	Sven Köhler (from Lippstadt 08)
—	MF	GER	Moritz Heyer (from Hallescher FC)
—	FW	GER	Nico Granatowski (from SV Meppen)
—	DF	GER	Kevin Wolze (from MSV Duisburg)

Out:

No.	Pos.	Nation	Player
11	FW	GER	Luca Pfeiffer (loan return to SC Paderborn 07)
19	FW	GER	Steffen Tigges (to Borussia Dortmund II)

=== Karlsruher SC ===
In:

No.	Pos.	Nation	Player
—	DF	LUX	Dirk Carlson (from Grasshoppers II)
—	MF	GER	Lukas Fröde (from MSV Duisburg)
--	GK	GER	Marius Gersbeck (from Hertha BSC)

Out:

No.	Pos.	Nation	Player
17	DF	GER	Tim Kircher (on loan to Carl Zeiss Jena)

=== SV Wehen Wiesbaden ===
In:

No.	Pos.	Nation	Player
—	MF	GER	Paterson Chato (from Sportfreunde Lotte)
—	DF	GER	Michel Niemeyer (from 1. FC Magdeburg)
27	DF	GER	Michael Guthörl (from Greuther Fürth II)
—	DF	GER	Tobias Mißner (from Borussia Dortmund Youth Sector)
—	MF	GER	Marvin Ajani (from Hallescher FC)
--	FW	GER	Phillip Tietz (from SC Paderborn 07, previously on loan at FC Carl Zeiss Jena)
--	GK	GER	Jan-Christoph Bartels (on loan from 1. FC Köln)

Out:

No.	Pos.	Nation	Player
23	DF	GER	Alf Mintzel (retired)
27	FW	GER	Simon Brandstetter (to Mainz 05 II)

== See also ==
- 2019–20 Bundesliga
- 2019–20 2. Bundesliga
