= Andreas Albers =

Danish footballer (born 1990)

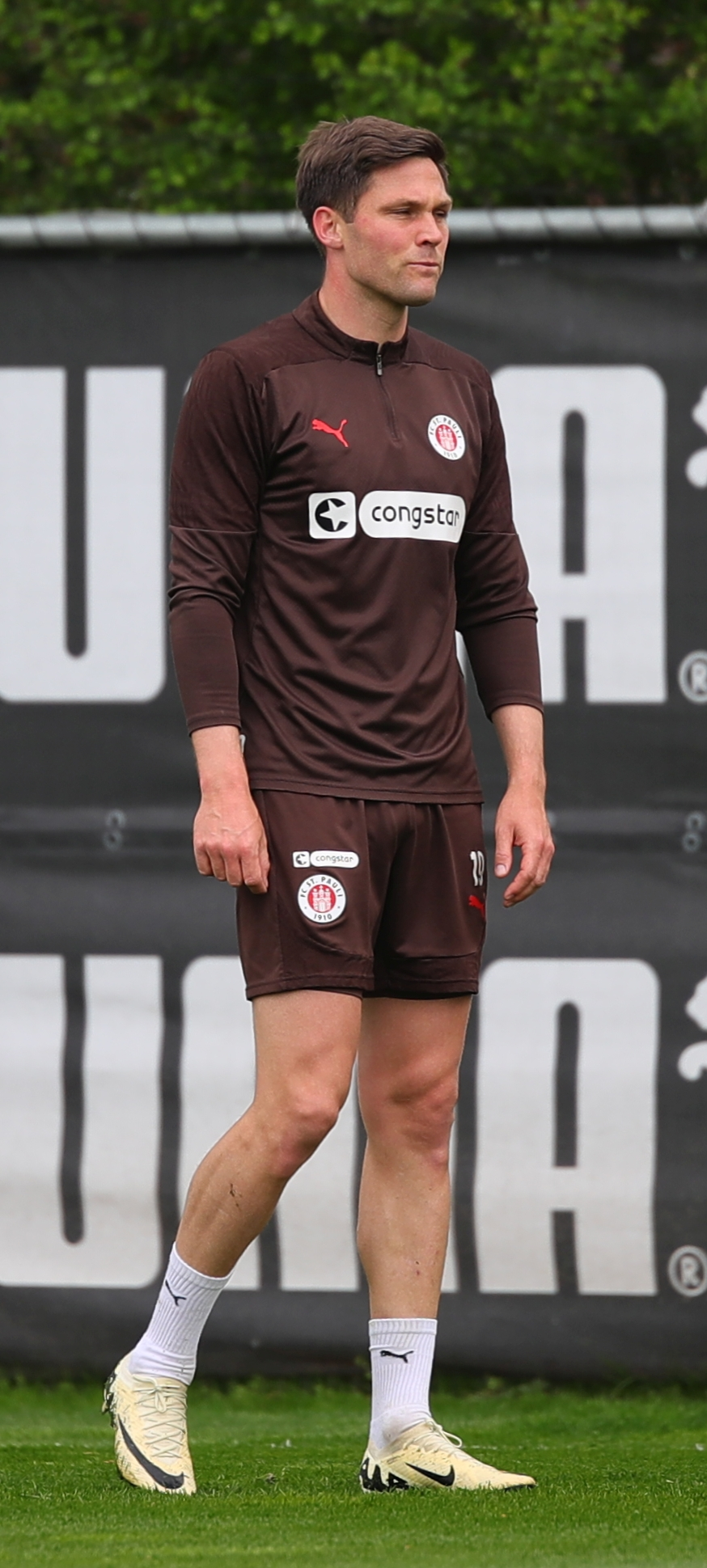
- Albers in 2025

Personal information
- Full name: Andreas Albers Nielsen
- Date of birth: 23 March 1990 (age 36)
- Place of birth: Skive, Denmark
- Height: 1.93 m (6 ft 4 in)
- Position: Forward

Youth career
- –2009: Skive IK

Senior career*
Years	Team	Apps	(Gls)
2009–2011	Skive IK	44	(10)
2011–2013	Vejle Kolding	56	(12)
2013–2015	Vejle BK	63	(26)
2015–2017	Silkeborg IF	61	(16)
2017–2019	Viborg FF	62	(28)
2019–2023	Jahn Regensburg	133	(36)
2023–2025	FC St. Pauli	31	(2)
Total		450	(130)
- * Club domestic league appearances and goals as of 07:11, 18 May 2025 (UTC)

Andreas Albers Nielsen (born 23 March 1990) is a Danish professional footballer who plays as a forward.

== Club career ==
=== Skive IK ===
Albers was promoted to the first team squad in the summer 2009.

=== Vejle Boldklub ===
On 7 January 2011, it was confirmed that Albers had signed a two-and-a-half-year contract with Vejle Boldklub. In the 2012–13 season. Albers played 30 league games, scoring 7 goals. After a good last season with 11 goals in 32 games, he left the club.

=== Silkeborg IF ===
Silkeborg IF confirmed on 22 May 2015 that they had signed Albers on a two-year contract. After his transfer, Albers stated that he had rejected offers from many Danish Superliga clubs, in favor of joining Silkeborg.

Albers revealed in December 2016 that he and the club had some difficulties about extending his contract. So the plan was to sell him in the January window, but however, he stayed in the club. Albers was not happy with his stay at Silkeborg because he sat to many minutes on the bench. He went out to medias in May 2017 and said, that it was his last season in Silkeborg and he would leave the club in the summer window.

=== Viborg FF ===
On 21 June 2017, Albers signed with Danish 1st Division club Viborg FF.

=== Jahn Regensburg ===
On 1 July 2019, Albers joined SSV Jahn Regensburg on a free transfer. He made his debut for the club on 28 July, coming off the bench for Sebastian Stolze in the 83rd minute and immediately proved himself decisive with an assist to Tom Baack in injury time to seal a 3–1 league victory against VfL Bochum. In the following league game, Albers scored his first goal for Jahn Regensburg, securing a 1–1 draw against Hannover 96.

=== St. Pauli ===
On 23 June 2023, Albers signed a contract with FC St. Pauli.

== Career statistics ==
As of match played 15 February 2025

Appearances and goals by club, season and competition
Club	Season	League			National cup (Note: Includes Danish Cup, DFB-Pokal)		Other		Total	
Club	Season	Division	Apps	Goals	Apps	Goals	Apps	Goals	Apps	Goals
Skive IK	2008–09	Danish 1st Division	8	1	—		—		8	1
Skive IK	2009–10	Danish 1st Division	22	5	—		—		22	5
Skive IK	2010–11	Danish 1st Division	14	4	—		—		14	4
Skive IK	Total		44	10	—		—		44	10
Vejle Boldklub	2010–11	Danish 1st Division	13	0	—		—		13	0
Vejle Boldklub	2011–12	Danish 1st Division	13	5	2	0	—		15	5
Vejle Boldklub	2012–13	Danish 1st Division	30	7	1	0	—		31	7
Vejle Boldklub	2013–14	Danish 1st Division	31	15	3	3	—		34	18
Vejle Boldklub	2014–15	Danish 1st Division	32	11	1	0	—		33	11
Vejle Boldklub	Total		119	38	7	3	—		126	41
Silkeborg IF	2015–16	Danish 1st Division	30	11	3	3	—		33	14
Silkeborg IF	2016–17	Danish Superliga	31	5	3	2	—		34	7
Silkeborg IF	Total		61	16	6	5	—		67	21
Viborg FF	2017–18	Danish 1st Division	31	17	1	0	—		32	17
Viborg FF	2018–19	Danish 1st Division	31	11	2	2	—		33	13
Viborg FF	Total		62	28	3	2	—		65	30
Jahn Regensburg	2019–20	2. Bundesliga	33	8	1	0	—		34	8
Jahn Regensburg	2020–21	2. Bundesliga	34	13	4	0	—		38	13
Jahn Regensburg	2021–22	2. Bundesliga	32	9	2	1	—		34	10
Jahn Regensburg	2022–23	2. Bundesliga	34	6	2	1	—		36	7
Jahn Regensburg	Total		133	36	9	2	—		142	38
FC St. Pauli	2023–24	2. Bundesliga	17	1	1	0	—		18	1
FC St. Pauli	2024–25	Bundesliga	14	1	1	0	—		15	1
FC St. Pauli	Total		31	2	2	0	—		33	2
Career total			450	130	27	12	—		477	142

== Honours ==
FC St. Pauli

- 2.Bundesliga: 2023–24
