= Kusi Kwame =

Ghanaian-German footballer

Personal information
- Date of birth: 9 August 1989 (age 37)
- Place of birth: Hamburg, Germany
- Height: 1.79 m (5 ft 10 in)
- Position: Full-back

Team information
- Current team: SV Blankenese
- Number: 6

Youth career
- Weiß-Blau 63 Hamburg
- Niendorfer TSV
- –2007: VfL 93 Hamburg

Senior career*
| Years | Team | Apps | (Gls) |
| 2007–2010 | USC Paloma | 56 | (1) |
| 2010–2012 | Holstein Kiel | 5 | (0) |
| 2010–2012 | Holstein Kiel II | 36 | (0) |
| 2012–2013 | VfR Neumünster | 34 | (3) |
| 2013–2017 | Fortuna Köln | 110 | (0) |
| 2017–2018 | Rot-Weiß Erfurt | 14 | (0) |
| 2018–2020 | Hamburger SV II | 24 | (1) |
| 2020–2022 | 1. FC Phönix Lübeck | 32 | (0) |
| 2022–2024 | ETSV Hamburg | 40 | (1) |
| 2024– | SV Blankenese | 12 | (0) |

Managerial career
- 2023–2024: ETSV Hamburg (assistant)
- 2023: ETSV Hamburg (caretaker)
- * Club domestic league appearances and goals as of 20:44, 25 December 2024 (UTC)

Kusi Kwame (born 9 August 1989) is a Ghanaian-German footballer who plays as a full-back for SV Blankenese.
