= Nicolas Wähling =

German footballer

Personal information
- Full name: Nicolas William Wähling
- Date of birth: 24 August 1997 (age 29)
- Place of birth: Ludwigsburg, Germany
- Height: 1.87 m (6 ft 2 in)
- Position: Forward

Team information
- Current team: SG Barockstadt Fulda-Lehnerz
- Number: 10

Youth career
- –2010: FC Neureut
- 2010–2015: Karlsruher SC
- 2015–2016: 1899 Hoffenheim

Senior career*
Years	Team	Apps	(Gls)
2016–2019	1899 Hoffenheim II	84	(13)
2019–2020	Jahn Regensburg II	9	(0)
2019–2021	Jahn Regensburg	4	(0)
2021–2022	SSV Ulm 1846	33	(6)
2022–2023	Energie Cottbus	35	(12)
2023–2024	TSV Steinbach	26	(3)
2024–2025	Cavalry FC	35	(1)
2026	FC Carl Zeiss Jena	15	(1)
2026-	SG Barockstadt	8	(0)
- * Club domestic league appearances and goals as of 24 September 2026

Nicolas William Wähling (born 24 August 1997) is a German professional footballer who plays as a forward for SG Barockstadt Fulda-Lehnerz in the Regionalliga Südwest.

== Early life ==
Wähling began playing youth football with FC Neureut, later moving to Karlsruher SC at U14 level, where he spent five years. Afterwards, he joined the youth system of 1899 Hoffenheim.

== Club career ==
=== Germany ===
From 2016 to 2019, Wähling played with 1899 Hoffenheim II.

In July 2019, he signed a three-year contract with 2. Bundesliga club SSV Jahn Regensburg. He agree to terminate his contract after two seasons, to facilitate a move to a new club, after having made four league appearances and one cup appearance, as well as nine appearances with the second team in the Bayernliga Süd.

In July 2021, he signed with SSV Ulm until June 2023, with an option for another season. After one season, he departed the club.

In July 2022, he signed with Regionalliga Nordost club Energie Cottbus. He departed the club at the end of the season, upon the expiration of his contract. After the season, he went on trial with 2.Bundesliga club SV Elversberg.

In August 2023, Wähling signed with TSV Steinbach Haiger in the Regionalliga Südwest on a one-year contract. At the end of the season, he departed the club.

=== Canada ===
In July 2024, Wähling signed with Canadian Premier League club Cavalry FC until December 2025. He made his debut on 13 July against York United FC. Wähling would score his first goal for the club in a 6-0 win in the 2025 Canadian Championship against League1 Alberta side Edmonton Scottish.

=== Return to Germany ===
In January 2026, Wähling signed with FC Carl Zeiss Jena in the German fourth tier Regionalliga Nordost.

== Personal life ==
Wähling is the son of a German father and an English mother. He is the younger brother of Alexander Wähling and the older brother of Oliver, Christopher, and Jaime, all of whom are also footballers.

== Career statistics ==
As of 29 June 2026

Appearances and goals by club, season and competition
Club	Season	League			National cup		Continental		Other		Total	
Club	Season	Division	Apps	Goals	Apps	Goals	Apps	Goals	Apps	Goals	Apps	Goals
1899 Hoffenheim II	2016–17	Regionalliga Südwest	21	2	–		–		–		21	2
1899 Hoffenheim II	2017–18	Regionalliga Südwest	31	9	–		–		–		31	9
1899 Hoffenheim II	2018–19	Regionalliga Südwest	32	2	–		–		–		32	2
1899 Hoffenheim II	Total		84	13	0	0	0	0	0	0	84	13
Jahn Regensburg II	2019–21	Bayernliga Süd	9	3	–		–		–		9	3
Jahn Regensburg	2019–20	2. Bundesliga	3	0	0	0	–		–		3	0
Jahn Regensburg	2020–21	2. Bundesliga	1	0	1	0	–		–		2	0
Jahn Regensburg	Total		4	0	1	0	0	0	0	0	5	0
SSV Ulm	2021–22	Regionalliga Südwest	33	6	1	0	–		–		34	6
Energie Cottbus	2022–23	Regionalliga Nordost	35	12	0	0	–		–		35	12
TSV Steinbach Haiger	2023–24	Regionalliga Südwest	26	3	–		–		–		26	3
Cavalry FC	2024	Canadian Premier League	13	0	0	0	0	0	1	0	14	0
Cavalry FC	2025	Canadian Premier League	22	1	3	1	2	0	2	0	29	2
Cavalry FC	Total		35	1	3	1	2	0	3	0	43	2
Carl Zeiss Jena	2025–26	Regionalliga Nordost	9	1	0	0	0	0	1	1	16	2
Career total			241	39	5	1	2	0	4	1	252	41
