= Federico Palacios =

German footballer

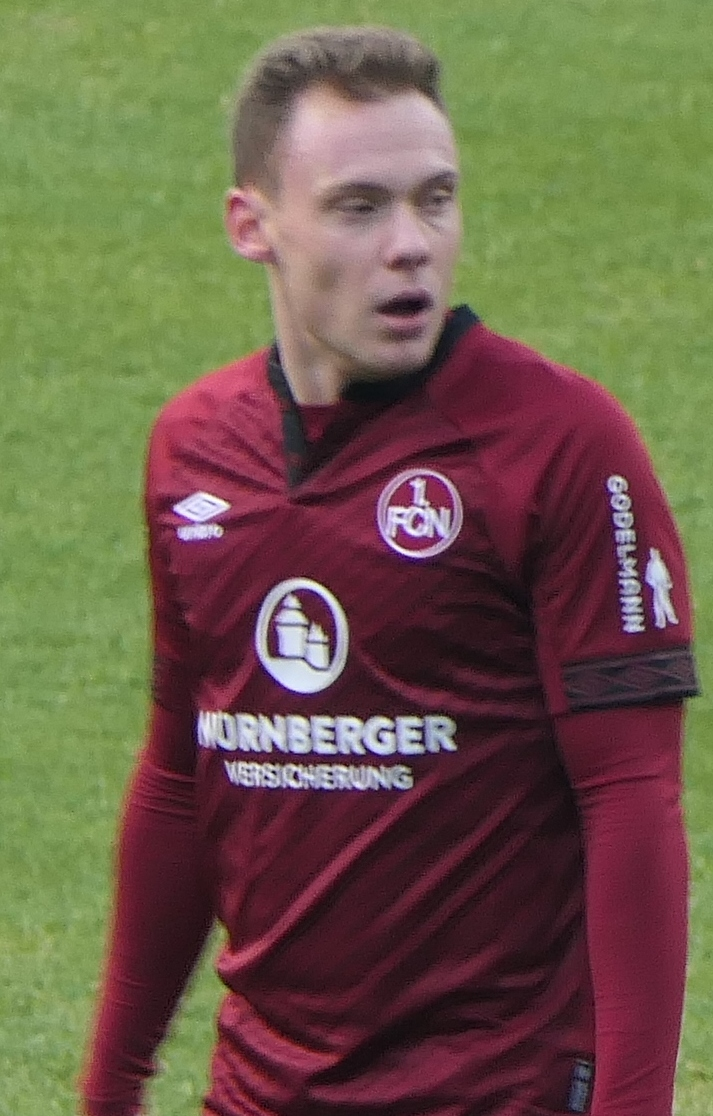
- Palacios with 1. FC Nürnberg in 2019

Personal information
- Full name: Federico Palacios Martínez
- Date of birth: 9 April 1995 (age 31)
- Place of birth: Hanover, Germany
- Height: 1.70 m (5 ft 7 in)
- Position: Striker

Team information
- Current team: FSV Schöningen
- Number: 9

Youth career
- SV Linden 07
- SG Limmer
- TSV Limmer
- –2009: SC Langenhagen
- 2009–2013: VfL Wolfsburg

Senior career*
Years	Team	Apps	(Gls)
2014–2018	RB Leipzig	9	(0)
2014–2017	RB Leipzig II	62	(32)
2015	→ Rot-Weiß Erfurt (loan)	8	(0)
2018–2019	1. FC Nürnberg	27	(2)
2019	1. FC Nürnberg II	1	(0)
2019–2021	Jahn Regensburg	9	(1)
2019	Jahn Regensburg II	2	(0)
2021	→ MSV Duisburg (loan)	11	(3)
2021–2023	Viktoria Köln	16	(0)
2023–2024	FK Panevėžys	43	(3)
2025–	FSV Schöningen	50	(1)

International career
2009–2010	Germany U15	3	(2)
2010–2011	Germany U16	6	(1)
2012	Germany U17	2	(0)
2013–2014	Germany U19	2	(0)
- * Club domestic league appearances and goals as of 22 September 2026

Federico Palacios Martínez (born 9 April 1995) is a German professional footballer who plays as a striker for FSV Schöningen.

== Personal life ==
Born in Germany, Palacios is of Spanish descent.

== Club career ==
=== Youth ===
Palacios joined the youth ranks of VfL Wolfsburg in 2009. His four and a half years stay culminated in winning the Under 19 Bundesliga in 2013. After a tremendous first half in the 2013–14 Under 19 Bundesliga season, scoring 29 goals in only 14 matches, Palacios attracted the attention of several clubs in Germany.

=== RB Leipzig ===
In January 2014, Palacios signed a professional contract with RB Leipzig until summer 2018. Leipzig had to pay a transfer fee of reportedly €600,000. He made his senior debut on 25 January 2014 coming on as a substitute for Denis Thomalla in a 3. Liga match against Wacker Burghausen.

He made his Bundesliga debut for RB Leipzig on 4 February 2017 as an 80th-minute substitute for Dominik Kaiser in an away 0–1 loss to Borussia Dortmund.

=== Rot-Weiß Erfurt ===
On 20 January 2015, he was loaned to 3. Liga side Rot-Weiß Erfurt until the end of the 2014–15 season.

=== 1. FC Nürnberg ===
In January 2018, 1. FC Nürnberg announced the signing of Palacios for an undisclosed fee.

=== SSV Jahn Regensburg ===
On 2 September 2019, SSV Jahn Regensburg announced the signing of Palacios on a three-year deal. He was loaned to MSV Duisburg on 20 January 2021 until the end of the 2020–21 season.

=== Viktoria Köln ===
After the 2020–21 season, he joined Viktoria Köln.

=== FK Panevėžys ===
On 30 June 2023, Palacios joined Lithuanian club Panevėžys, on a contract for the rest of the 2023 A Lyga season.

=== FSV Schöningen ===
On 3 February 2025 FSV Schöningen (Oberliga Niedersachsen) announced about transfer.

== International career ==
Palacios played for the Germany U17 national team and Germany U19 national team each two times.

== Career statistics ==
As of match played on 22 May 2021

Appearances and goals by club, season and competition
Club	Season	League			Cup		Other		Total	
Club	Season	Division	Apps	Goals	Apps	Goals	Apps	Goals	Apps	Goals
RB Leipzig	2013–14	3. Liga	5	0	0	0	—		5	0
RB Leipzig	2014–15	2. Bundesliga	2	0	1	0	—		3	0
RB Leipzig	2016–17	Bundesliga	2	0	0	0	—		2	0
RB Leipzig	2017–18	Bundesliga	0	0	0	0	—		0	0
RB Leipzig	Total		9	0	1	0	0	0	10	0
Rot-Weiß Erfurt (loan)	2014–15	3. Liga	8	0	0	0	—		8	0
RB Leipzig II	2014–15	NOFV-Oberliga Süd	4	4	—				4	4
RB Leipzig II	2015–16	Regionalliga Nordost	28	6	—				28	6
RB Leipzig II	2016–17	Regionalliga Nordost	30	22	—				30	22
RB Leipzig II	Total		62	32	0	0	0	0	62	32
1. FC Nürnberg	2017–18	2. Bundesliga	9	0	0	0	—		9	0
1. FC Nürnberg	2018–19	Bundesliga	17	2	3	1	—		20	3
1. FC Nürnberg	2019–20	2. Bundesliga	1	0	0	0	—		1	0
1. FC Nürnberg	Total		27	2	3	1	0	0	30	3
1. FC Nürnberg II	2019–20	Regionalliga Bayern	1	0	—				1	0
Jahn Regensburg	2019–20	2. Bundesliga	8	1	0	0	—		8	1
Jahn Regensburg	2020–21	2. Bundesliga	1	0	1	0	—		2	0
Jahn Regensburg	Total		9	1	1	0	0	0	10	1
Jahn Regensburg II	2019–20	Bayernliga	2	0	—				2	0
MSV Duisburg (loan)	2020–21	3. Liga	11	3	—				11	3
Career totals			125	33	5	1	0	0	130	34

== Honours ==
VfL Wolfsburg U19

- Under 19 Bundesliga: 2013

RB Leipzig

- 3. Liga runners-up: 2013–14
