= Max Besuschkow =

German professional footballer

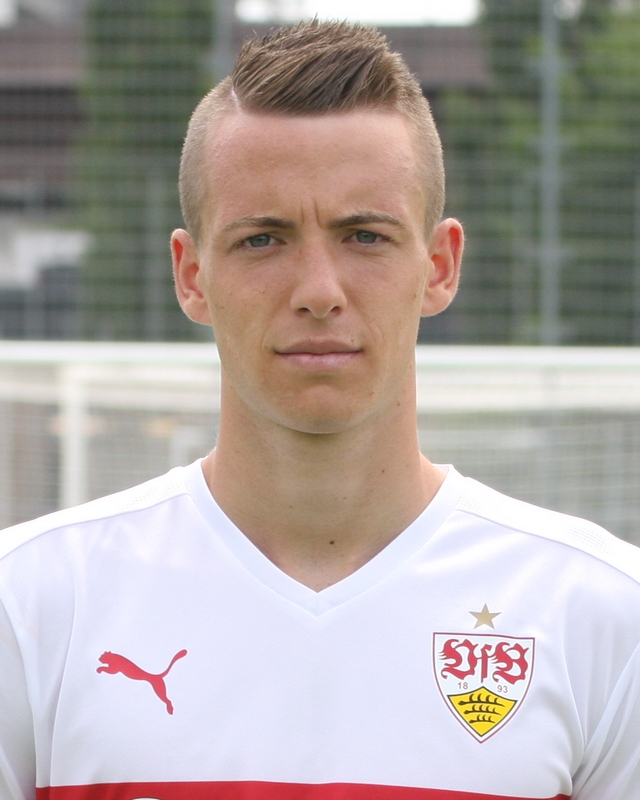
- Besuschkow with VfB Stuttgart II in 2015

Personal information
- Date of birth: 31 May 1997 (age 29)
- Place of birth: Tübingen, Germany
- Height: 1.85 m (6 ft 1 in)
- Position: Midfielder

Team information
- Current team: MSV Duisburg

Youth career
- 2002–2006: FC Rottenburg
- 2006–2015: VfB Stuttgart

Senior career*
Years	Team	Apps	(Gls)
2015–2017	VfB Stuttgart II	36	(7)
2016–2017	VfB Stuttgart	0	(0)
2017–2019	Eintracht Frankfurt	3	(0)
2018	→ Holstein Kiel (loan)	1	(0)
2018–2019	→ Union SG (loan)	26	(0)
2019–2022	Jahn Regensburg	97	(14)
2022–2024	Hannover 96	32	(1)
2023–2024	Hannover 96 II	2	(0)
2024	→ Austria Klagenfurt (loan)	15	(2)
2024–2026	FC Ingolstadt	58	(9)
2026–	MSV Duisburg	12	(0)

International career
2011	Germany U15	2	(0)
2013	Germany U16	6	(1)
2013–2014	Germany U17	13	(2)
2014–2015	Germany U18	4	(0)
2015–2016	Germany U19	10	(3)
- * Club domestic league appearances and goals as of 17:43, 7 November 2026 (UTC)

Max Besuschkow (born 31 May 1997) is a German professional footballer who plays as a midfielder for MSV Duisburg.

== Club career ==
On 25 July 2015, Besuschkow made his debut for VfB Stuttgart II in the 3. Liga against Dynamo Dresden.

On 3 January 2017, Besuschkow joined Bundesliga club Eintracht Frankfurt on a contract until June 2020. In January 2018, he joined 2. Bundesliga side Holstein Kiel on loan for the second half of the season.

On 23 July 2018, Besuschkow was loaned out to Royale Union Saint-Gilloise until June 2020.

Besuschkow joined Hannover 96 in 2022. He was loaned out to Austria Klagenfurt for the second half of the 2023–24 season.

On 2 September 2024, Besuschkow joined FC Ingolstadt.

After two years at Ingolstadt, he moved to MSV Duisburg for the 2026–27 season.

== International career ==
Besuschkow played for German under-17 team at the 2014 UEFA European Under-17 Championship.

== Career statistics ==
As of 7 November 2026

Appearances and goals by club, season and competition
Club	Season	League			Cup		Other		Total	
Club	Season	Division	Apps	Goals	Apps	Goals	Apps	Goals	Apps	Goals
VfB Stuttgart II	2015–16	3. Liga	33	4	—		—		33	4
VfB Stuttgart II	2016–17	Regionalliga Südwest	3	3	—		—		3	3
VfB Stuttgart II	Total		36	7	—		—		36	7
Eintracht Frankfurt	2016–17	Bundesliga	3	0	1	0	—		4	0
Holstein Kiel (loan)	2017–18	2. Bundesliga	1	0	0	0	—		1	0
Union SG (loan)	2018–19	Belgian First Division B	21	0	4	0	4 (Note: Appearances in Europa League play-offs)	0	29	0
Jahn Regensburg	2019–20	2. Bundesliga	32	6	1	1	—		33	7
Jahn Regensburg	2020–21	2. Bundesliga	32	3	3	0	—		35	3
Jahn Regensburg	2021–22	2. Bundesliga	33	5	2	1	—		35	6
Jahn Regensburg	Total		97	14	6	2	—		103	16
Hannover 96	2022–23	2. Bundesliga	31	1	2	0	—		33	1
Hannover 96	2023–24	2. Bundesliga	1	0	1	0	—		2	0
Hannover 96	Total		32	1	3	0	—		35	1
Austria Klagenfurt (loan)	2023–24	Austrian Football Bundesliga	15	2	0	0	—		15	2
FC Ingolstadt	2024–25	3. Liga	24	4	—		—		24	4
FC Ingolstadt	2025–26	3. Liga	34	5	—		—		34	5
FC Ingolstadt	Total		58	9	—		—		58	9
MSV Duisburg	2026–27	3. Liga	12	0	0	0	—		12	0
Career total			275	33	14	2	4	0	293	35
