= Alexander Meyer (footballer, born 1991) =

German footballer (born 1991)

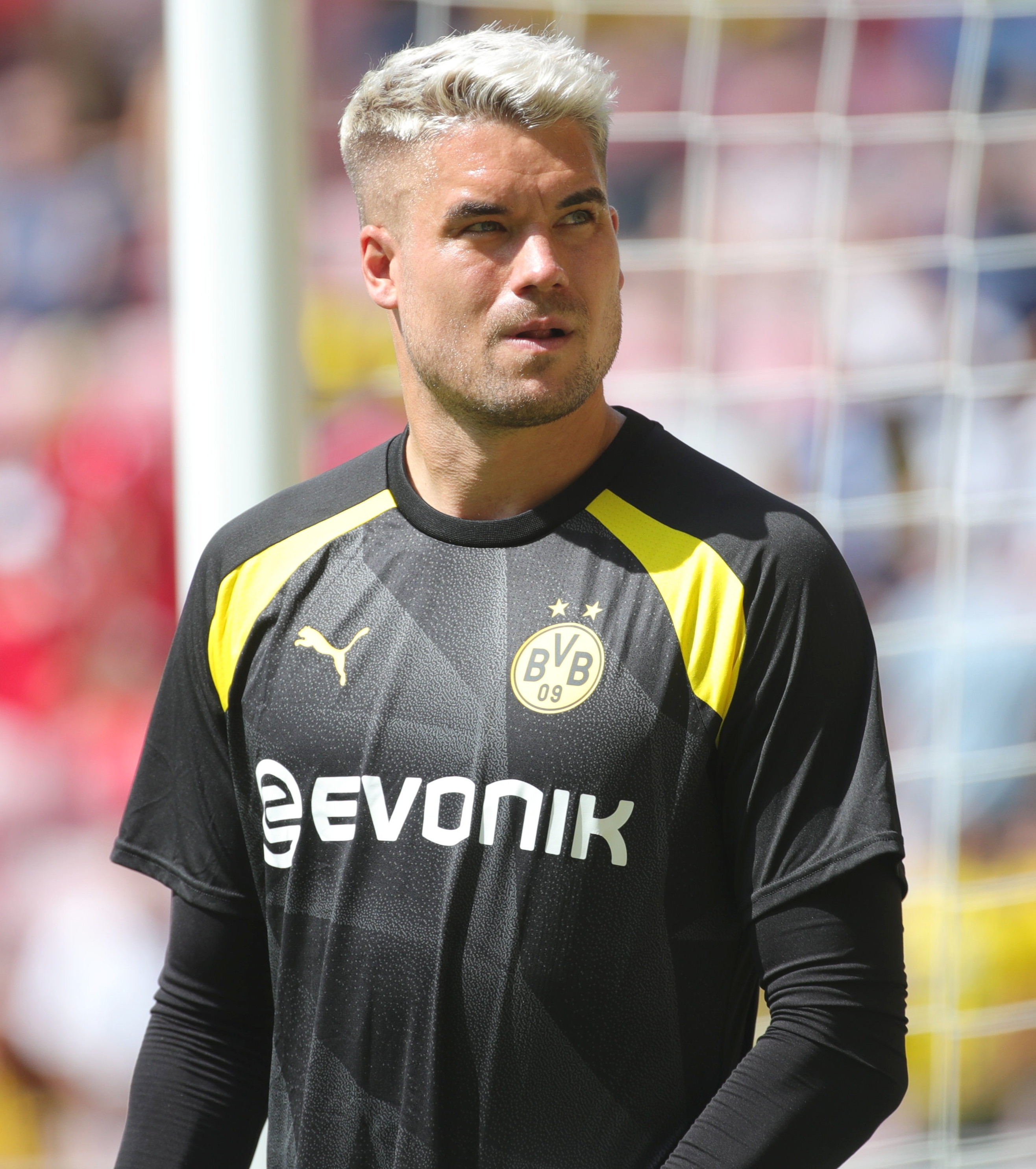
- Meyer with Borussia Dortmund in 2023

Personal information
- Full name: Alexander Niklas Meyer-Schade
- Date of birth: 13 April 1991 (age 35)
- Place of birth: Bad Oldesloe, Germany
- Height: 1.95 m (6 ft 5 in)
- Position: Goalkeeper

Team information
- Current team: Borussia Dortmund
- Number: 33

Youth career
- –2005: VfL Oldesloe
- 2005–2009: Hamburger SV

Senior career*
Years	Team	Apps	(Gls)
2009–2012	Hamburger SV II	10	(0)
2012–2016	TSV Havelse	96	(0)
2016–2017	Energie Cottbus	19	(0)
2017–2019	VfB Stuttgart	0	(0)
2018	VfB Stuttgart II	4	(0)
2019–2022	Jahn Regensburg	94	(0)
2022–	Borussia Dortmund	17	(0)
- * Club domestic league appearances and goals as of 17:21, 9 November 2024 (UTC)

Alexander Niklas Meyer-Schade (born 13 April 1991) is a German professional footballer who plays as a goalkeeper for Bundesliga club Borussia Dortmund.

== Career ==
In August 2017, Meyer joined Bundesliga club VfB Stuttgart. After not making a first team appearance in two seasons, he joined second-division club Jahn Regensburg in 2019. He made his professional debut for Regensburg in the 2. Bundesliga on 28 July 2019, starting in the home match against VfL Bochum.

In 2022, he joined Bundesliga club Borussia Dortmund. He made his debut in a 3–0 win over FC Copenhagen in the 2022–23 UEFA Champions League, keeping a clean sheet in the first top flight match of his career.

== Career statistics ==
As of match played 1 September 2026

Appearances and goals by club, season and competition
Club	Season	League			Cup		Continental		Other		Total	
Club	Season	Division	Apps	Goals	Apps	Goals	Apps	Goals	Apps	Goals	Apps	Goals
Hamburger SV II	2010–11	Regionalliga Nord	8	0	—		—		—		8	0
Hamburger SV II	2011–12	Regionalliga Nord	2	0	—		—		—		2	0
Hamburger SV II	Total		10	0	—		—		—		10	0
TSV Havelse	2012–13	Regionalliga Nord	12	0	2	0	—		—		14	0
TSV Havelse	2013–14	Regionalliga Nord	15	0	1	0	—		—		16	0
TSV Havelse	2014–15	Regionalliga Nord	33	0	3	0	—		—		36	0
TSV Havelse	2015–16	Regionalliga Nord	26	0	1	0	—		—		27	0
TSV Havelse	Total		96	0	7	0	—		—		103	0
Energie Cottbus	2016–17	Regionalliga Nordost	14	0	3	0	—		—		17	0
Energie Cottbus	2017–18	Regionalliga Nordost	5	0	1	0	—		—		6	0
Energie Cottbus	Total		19	0	4	0	—		—		23	0
VfB Stuttgart II	2017–18	Regionalliga Südwest	4	0	—		—		—		4	0
VfB Stuttgart	2017–18	Bundesliga	0	0	0	0	—		—		0	0
VfB Stuttgart	2018–19	Bundesliga	0	0	0	0	—		—		0	0
VfB Stuttgart	Total		0	0	0	0	—		—		0	0
Jahn Regensburg	2019–20	2. Bundesliga	31	0	1	0	—		—		32	0
Jahn Regensburg	2020–21	2. Bundesliga	33	0	4	0	—		—		37	0
Jahn Regensburg	2021–22	2. Bundesliga	30	0	2	0	—		—		32	0
Jahn Regensburg	Total		94	0	7	0	—		—		101	0
Borussia Dortmund	2022–23	Bundesliga	7	0	0	0	5 (Note: Appearance(s) in UEFA Champions League)	0	—		12	0
Borussia Dortmund	2023–24	Bundesliga	8	0	0	0	1	0	—		9	0
Borussia Dortmund	2024–25	Bundesliga	2	0	1	0	1	0	0	0	4	0
Borussia Dortmund	2025–26	Bundesliga	0	0	0	0	0	0	—		0	0
Borussia Dortmund	2026–27	Bundesliga	0	0	1	0	0	0	—		1	0
Borussia Dortmund	Total		17	0	2	0	7	0	0	0	26	0
Career total			240	0	20	0	7	0	0	0	267	0
