= Kevin Kunz =

German footballer (born 1992)

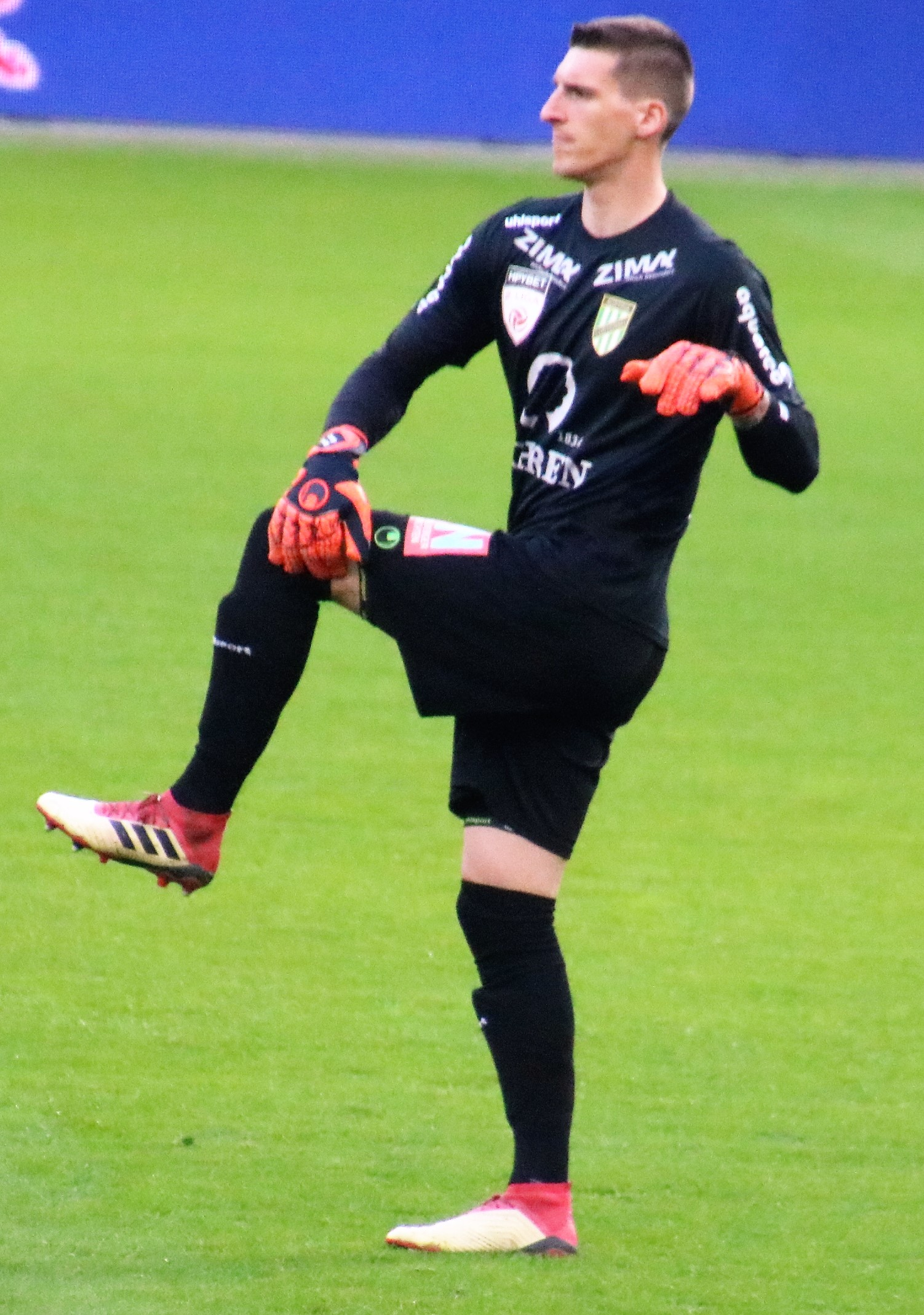
- Kunz in 2019

Personal information
- Date of birth: 22 January 1992 (age 34)
- Place of birth: Neckergartach, Germany
- Height: 1.90 m (6 ft 3 in)
- Position: Goalkeeper

Youth career
- –2012: SGV Freiberg

Senior career*
Years	Team	Apps	(Gls)
2012–2015	SG Sonnenhof Großaspach	34	(0)
2015–2018	Chemnitzer FC	96	(0)
2018–2020	Austria Lustenau	33	(0)
2020–2022	Jahn Regensburg II	6	(0)
2020–2022	Jahn Regensburg	2	(0)
2022–2024	Carl Zeiss Jena	64	(0)
2024	MSV Duisburg	0	(0)
Total		235	(0)
- * Club domestic league appearances and goals

Kevin Kunz (born 22 January 1992) is a German former professional footballer who played as a goalkeeper.

== Club career ==
Kunz signed with SSV Jahn Regensburg in January 2020. After two years each at Regensburg and Carl Zeiss Jena, he signed in June 2024 with MSV Duisburg. In December 2024, he announced his retirement from football.

== Career statistics ==
Appearances and goals by club, season and competition
Club	Season	Division	League		Cup		Total	
Club	Season	Division	Apps	Goals	Apps	Goals	Apps	Goals
Sonnenhof Großaspach	2012–13	Regionalliga Südwest	2	0	—		2	0
Sonnenhof Großaspach	2013–14	Regionalliga Südwest	11	0	—		11	0
Sonnenhof Großaspach	2014–15	Regionalliga Südwest	21	0	—		21	0
Sonnenhof Großaspach	Total		34	0	—		34	0
Chemnitzer FC	2015–16	3. Liga	31	0	1	0	32	0
Chemnitzer FC	2016–17	3. Liga	38	0	—		38	0
Chemnitzer FC	2017–18	3. Liga	27	0	1	0	28	0
Chemnitzer FC	Total		96	0	2	0	96	0
Austria Lustenau	2018–19	2. Liga	21	0	2	0	23	0
Austria Lustenau	2019–20	2. Liga	12	0	—		12	0
Austria Lustenau	Total		33	0	2	0	35	0
Jahn Regensburg II	2020–21	Bayernliga	4	0	—		4	0
Jahn Regensburg II	2021–22	Bayernliga	2	0	—		2	0
Jahn Regensburg II	Total		6	0	—		6	0
Jahn Regensburg	2020–21	2. Bundesliga	2	0	—		2	0
Carl Zeiss Jena	2022–23	Regionalliga Nordost	32	0	1	0	33	0
Carl Zeiss Jena	2023–24	Regionalliga Nordost	32	0	1	0	33	0
Carl Zeiss Jena	Total		64	0	2	0	64	0
MSV Duisburg	2024–25	Regionalliga West	0	0	—		0	0
Career total			235	0	6	0	241	0
