= David Otto =

German footballer (born 1999)

Personal information
- Date of birth: 3 March 1999 (age 27)
- Place of birth: Pforzheim, Germany
- Height: 1.85 m (6 ft 1 in)
- Position: Forward

Team information
- Current team: Viktoria Köln
- Number: 10

Youth career
- 1. FC 08 Birkenfeld
- TSG Hoffenheim

Senior career*
| Years | Team | Apps | (Gls) |
| 2017–2019 | TSG Hoffenheim II | 10 | (1) |
| 2017–2022 | TSG Hoffenheim | 3 | (0) |
| 2019–2021 | → 1. FC Heidenheim (loan) | 30 | (1) |
| 2021–2022 | → Jahn Regensburg (loan) | 37 | (4) |
| 2022–2023 | FC St. Pauli | 27 | (2) |
| 2023–2025 | SV Sandhausen | 73 | (13) |
| 2025– | Viktoria Köln | 38 | (8) |

International career^{‡}
| 2016 | Germany U18 | 3 | (1) |
| 2017 | Germany U19 | 1 | (0) |
| 2018–2019 | Germany U20 | 8 | (3) |
- * Club domestic league appearances and goals as of 29 May 2026 ‡ National team caps and goals as of 30 January 2023

David Otto (German pronunciation: [ˈdaːvɪt ˈʔɔtoː, -fɪt -]; born 3 March 1999) is a German professional footballer who plays as a forward for 3. Liga club Viktoria Köln.

== Career ==
On 20 May 2019, it was confirmed that Otto would play the 2019–20 season for 1. FC Heidenheim on loan from TSG Hoffenheim.

On 20 January 2021, Otto signed on loan with SSV Jahn Regensburg until the end of the 2021–22 season.

On 30 June 2022, Otto signed for FC St. Pauli.

On 25 July 2023, Otto moved to SV Sandhausen in 3. Liga.

== Career statistics ==
As of match played 23 May 2026

Appearances and goals by club, season and competition
| Club | Season | League | | | DFB-Pokal | | Continental | | Other | | Total | |
| Club | Season | Division | Apps | Goals | Apps | Goals | Apps | Goals | Apps | Goals | Apps | Goals |
|---|---|---|---|---|---|---|---|---|---|---|---|---|
| TSG Hoffenheim II | 2017–18 | Regionalliga Südwest | 2 | 0 | — | | — | | — | | 2 | 0 |
| TSG Hoffenheim II | 2018–19 | Regionalliga Südwest | 8 | 1 | — | | — | | — | | 8 | 1 |
| TSG Hoffenheim II | Total | | 10 | 1 | — | | — | | — | | 10 | 1 |
| TSG Hoffenheim | 2017–18 | Bundesliga | — | | — | | 1 (Note: Appearance in UEFA Europa League) | 0 | — | | 1 | 0 |
| TSG Hoffenheim | 2018–19 | Bundesliga | 3 | 0 | 0 | 0 | — | | — | | 3 | 0 |
| TSG Hoffenheim | Total | | 3 | 0 | 0 | 0 | 1 | 0 | — | | 4 | 0 |
| 1. FC Heidenheim (loan) | 2019–20 | 2. Bundesliga | 25 | 1 | 2 | 0 | — | | 2 (Note: Appearance(s) in Bundesliga relegation play-offs) | 0 | 29 | 1 |
| 1. FC Heidenheim (loan) | 2020–21 | 2. Bundesliga | 5 | 0 | — | | — | | — | | 5 | 0 |
| 1. FC Heidenheim (loan) | Total | | 30 | 1 | 2 | 0 | — | | 2 | 0 | 34 | 1 |
| Jahn Regensburg (loan) | 2020–21 | 2. Bundesliga | 17 | 1 | 2 | 0 | — | | — | | 19 | 1 |
| Jahn Regensburg (loan) | 2021–22 | 2. Bundesliga | 20 | 3 | 2 | 0 | — | | — | | 22 | 3 |
| Jahn Regensburg (loan) | Total | | 37 | 4 | 4 | 0 | — | | — | | 41 | 4 |
| FC St. Pauli | 2022–23 | 2. Bundesliga | 27 | 2 | 2 | 1 | — | | — | | 29 | 3 |
| SV Sandhausen | 2023–24 | 3. Liga | 38 | 8 | 2 | 0 | — | | — | | 40 | 8 |
| SV Sandhausen | 2024–25 | 3. Liga | 35 | 5 | 1 | 0 | — | | — | | 36 | 5 |
| SV Sandhausen | Total | | 73 | 13 | 3 | 0 | — | | — | | 76 | 13 |
| Viktoria Köln | 2025–26 | 3. Liga | 38 | 9 | 1 | 1 | — | | 4 (Note: Appearances in Middle Rhine Cup) | 0 | 43 | 10 |
| Career total | | | 218 | 30 | 12 | 2 | 1 | 0 | 6 | 0 | 237 | 32 |
