= Jan-Marc Schneider =

German footballer

Personal information
- Date of birth: 25 March 1994 (age 32)
- Place of birth: Hamburg, Germany
- Height: 1.78 m (5 ft 10 in)
- Position: Winger

Team information
- Current team: SV Todesfelde
- Number: 35

Youth career
- SV Halstenbek-Rellingen
- –2011: Hamburger SV
- 2011–2012: SV Blankenese

Senior career*
Years	Team	Apps	(Gls)
2012–2013	SV Blankenese		
2013–2014	Eintracht Norderstedt	29	(4)
2014–2015	SV Halstenbek-Rellingen	28	(29)
2015–2019	FC St. Pauli II	85	(37)
2017–2019	FC St. Pauli	27	(2)
2019–2021	Jahn Regensburg	29	(2)
2021–2022	PAS Giannina	31	(4)
2023	FSV Zwickau	14	(3)
2023–2024	VfB Lübeck	29	(2)
2024–	SV Todesfelde	43	(7)

International career
	Germany U15	1	(0)
- * Club domestic league appearances and goals as of 22 September 2026

Jan-Marc Schneider (born 25 March 1994) is a German professional footballer who plays as a forward for Regionalliga Nord club SV Todesfelde.

== Career ==
On 23 October 2017, Schneider scored his first professional goal for FC St. Pauli's first team. On 10 July 2021, he signed a contract with PAS Giannina.

In January 2023, Schneider joined FSV Zwickau on a contract until the end of the season.

On 28 June 2023, Schneider signed a two-year contract with VfB Lübeck.
