= Marco Grüttner =

German footballer

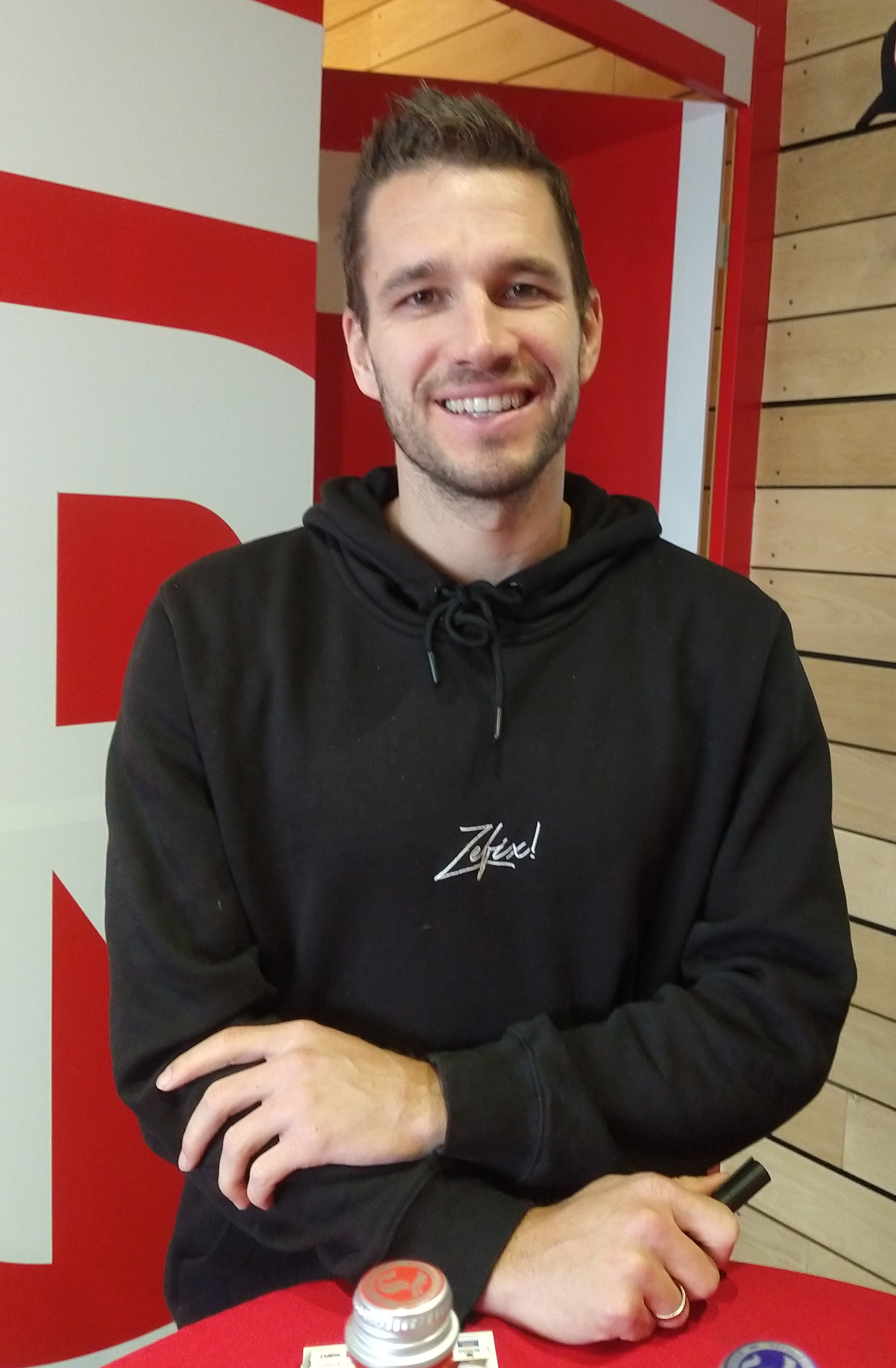
- Grüttner in 2019

Personal information
- Date of birth: 17 October 1985 (age 41)
- Place of birth: Ludwigsburg, West Germany
- Height: 1.85 m (6 ft 1 in)
- Position: Striker

Youth career
- GSV Erdmannhausen
- –2004: SGV Freiberg

Senior career*
Years	Team	Apps	(Gls)
2004–2006	SGS Großaspach	55	(14)
2006–2007	TSV Schwieberdingen	30	(24)
2007–2009	SGV Freiberg	66	(38)
2009–2010	SSV Ulm 1846	15	(4)
2010–2011	VfR Aalen	32	(7)
2011–2013	Stuttgarter Kickers	64	(29)
2013–2016	VfB Stuttgart II	100	(20)
2016–2020	SSV Jahn Regensburg	133	(47)
2020–2022	SGV Freiberg	84	(47)
- * Club domestic league appearances and goals

Marco Grüttner (born 17 October 1985) is a German former footballer who played as a striker.

== Career ==
Grüttner began his career playing amateur football in Baden-Württemberg before joining SSV Ulm 1846 of the Regionalliga Süd in 2009. He spent half a season with the club before joining VfR Aalen of the same level, who he helped win the title and promotion to the 3. Liga. He made his debut at this level on 31 July 2010 as a substitute for Elia Soriano in a 2–1 defeat to TuS Koblenz, but he only scored once in eighteen appearances in the 2010–11 season.

In July 2011, Grüttner signed for Stuttgarter Kickers of the Regionalliga Süd, and he was the club's top scorer that season as they won the division. Grüttner finished as the third top scorer of the 2012–13 3. Liga with 18 goals as the Kickers survived relegation, finishing 17th.

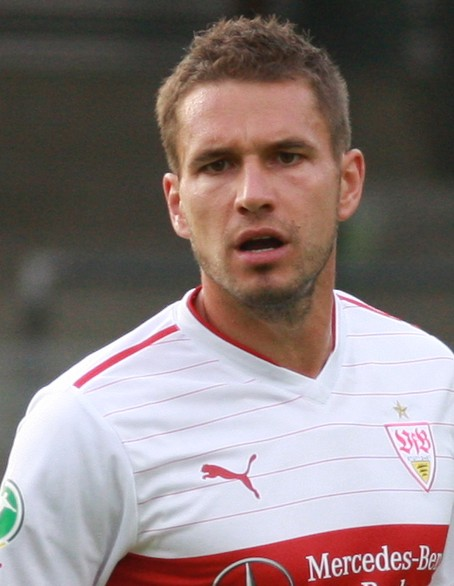
Grüttner playing for Stuttgart in 2013

On 1 July 2013, Grüttner moved to VfB Stuttgart II, and on 10 April 2013 he signed a contract that would keep with the team through June 2016.

In the 2016 summer transfer window, he joined SSV Jahn Regensburg. He was made captain of the team by coach Achim Beierlorzer at the start of the 2017–18 season. In August 2017, he agreed to a one-year contract extension with Regensburg, tying him to the club until summer 2019. In June 2018, his contract was extended by a further year. In November 2019, he decided to return to Baden-Württemberg at the end of the 2019–20 season.

In September 2018, he was awarded the Fair-Play-Medal by the DFB for the 2017–18 season.

== Honours ==
VfR Aalen

- Regionalliga Süd: 2009–10

Stuttgarter Kickers

- Regionalliga Süd: 2011–12
