= Chima Okoroji =

German footballer

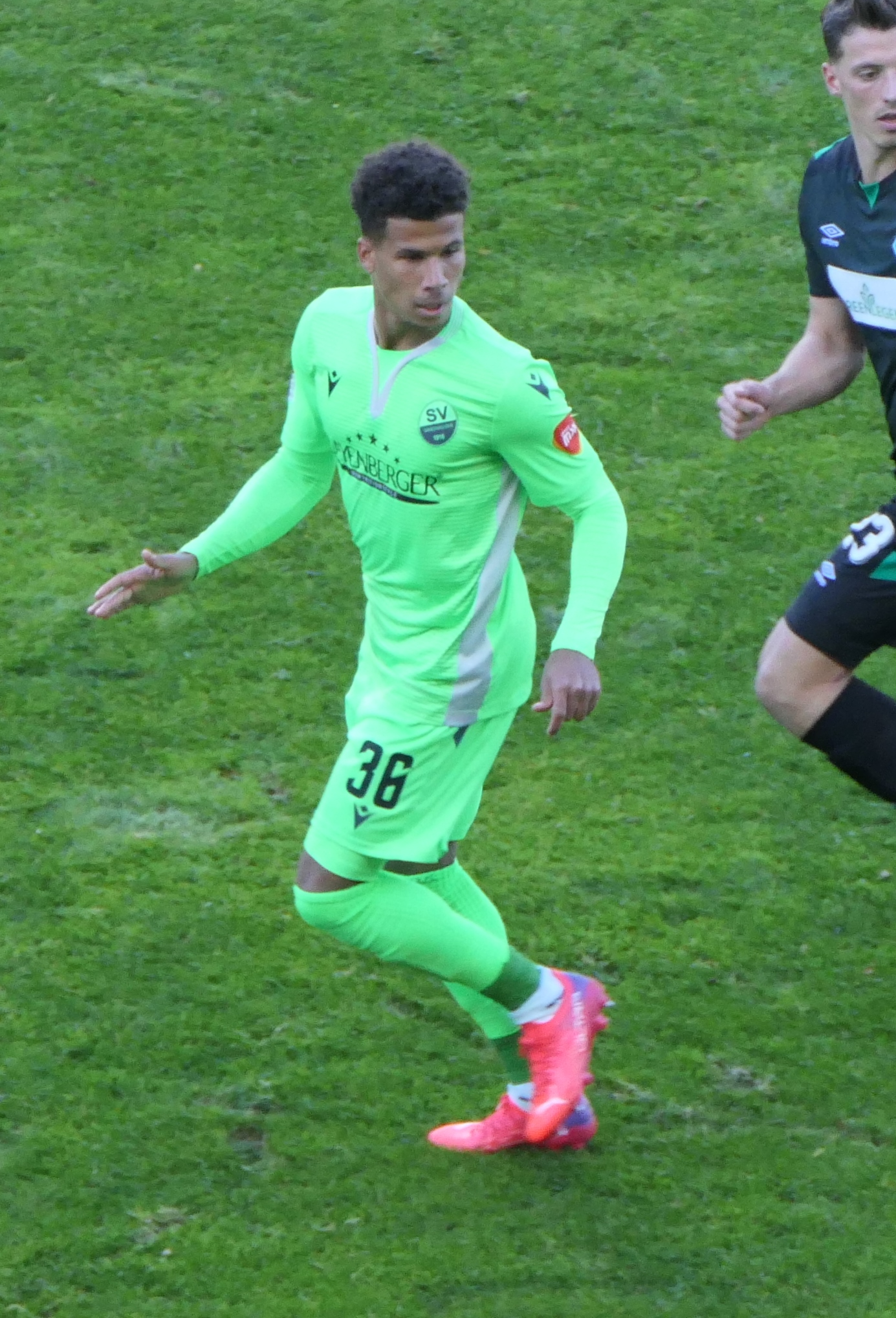

Personal information
- Full name: Chima Sean Okoroji
- Date of birth: 19 April 1997 (age 29)
- Place of birth: Munich, Germany
- Height: 1.77 m (5 ft 10 in)
- Position: Left-back

Team information
- Current team: St. Gallen
- Number: 36

Youth career
- –2004: TSV Grünwald
- 2004–2014: Bayern Munich
- 2015–2016: FC Augsburg

Senior career*
Years	Team	Apps	(Gls)
2015–2017	FC Augsburg II	39	(0)
2017–2021	SC Freiburg II	49	(1)
2018–2021	SC Freiburg	2	(0)
2019–2020	→ Jahn Regensburg (loan)	34	(1)
2020–2021	→ SC Paderborn (loan)	15	(0)
2021–2023	SV Sandhausen	52	(1)
2023–	St. Gallen	103	(3)
- * Club domestic league appearances and goals as of 28 September 2026

Chima Sean Okoroji (born 19 April 1997) is a German professional footballer who plays as a left-back for Swiss club St. Gallen.

== Club career ==
Okoroji made his professional debut for SC Freiburg in the Bundesliga on 21 October 2018, coming on as a substitute in the 73rd minute for Roland Sallai in the 1–1 away draw against Hertha BSC.

On 22 July 2023, Okoroji signed a two-year contract with St. Gallen in Switzerland.

== Personal life ==
Okoroji was born in Germany, to a Nigerian father and an English mother from Liverpool.
