= Tim Knipping =

German footballer (born 1992)

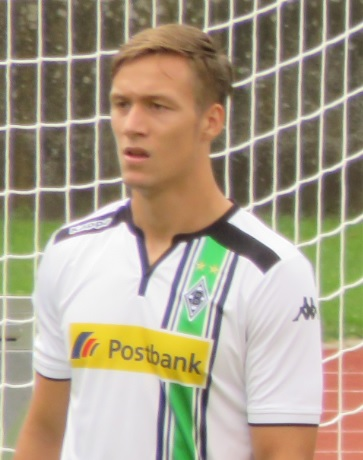
- Knipping with Borussia Mönchengladbach II in 2015

Personal information
- Date of birth: 24 November 1992 (age 33)
- Place of birth: Kassel, Germany
- Height: 1.89 m (6 ft 2 in)
- Position: Centre back

Team information
- Current team: KSV Hessen Kassel
- Number: 4

Youth career
- –2006: Olympia Kassel
- 2006–2011: KSV Hessen Kassel

Senior career*
Years	Team	Apps	(Gls)
2011–2012	KSV Hessen Kassel	37	(1)
2012–2014	1. FC Saarbrücken	44	(1)
2014–2016	Borussia Mönchengladbach II	67	(7)
2016–2019	SV Sandhausen	22	(2)
2019–2020	Jahn Regensburg	15	(0)
2020–2023	Dynamo Dresden	85	(2)
2023–2025	SV Sandhausen	23	(0)
2024–2025	→ SpVgg Unterhaching (loan)	27	(1)
2026–	KSV Hessen Kassel	13	(0)
- * Club domestic league appearances and goals as of 24 September 2026

Tim Knipping (born 24 November 1992) is a German professional footballer who plays as a centre-back for KSV Hessen Kassel.

== Career ==
Knipping began his career with KSV Hessen Kassel, and broke into the first team near the end of the 2010–11 season. He joined 1. FC Saarbrücken in July 2012 and made his 3. Liga debut for the club two months later, as a substitute for Sven Sökler in a 2–1 away win over Stuttgarter Kickers. After Saarbrücken were relegated at the end of the 2013–14 season, Knipping moved to Borussia Mönchengladbach II. In 2016, he joined SV Sandhausen. In summer 2019, he moved to SSV Jahn Regensburg. He was disappointed with his playing time in Regensburg and joined Dynamo Dresden who were relegated to the 3. Liga.

On 6 August 2024, Knipping joined Unterhaching on loan.

On 4 January 2026, Knipping returned to KSV Hessen Kassel on a contract until 30.06.2027.
