= Julian Derstroff =

German footballer

Personal information
- Full name: Julian-Maurice Derstroff
- Date of birth: 5 January 1992 (age 34)
- Place of birth: Zweibrücken, Germany
- Height: 1.82 m (6 ft 0 in)
- Position: Forward

Team information
- Current team: Mainz 05 II
- Number: 8

Youth career
- 1997–2002: SV Ixheim
- 2002–2011: 1. FC Kaiserslautern

Senior career*
| Years | Team | Apps | (Gls) |
| 2011–2013 | 1. FC Kaiserslautern II | 8 | (2) |
| 2011–2013 | 1. FC Kaiserslautern | 19 | (1) |
| 2013–2015 | Borussia Dortmund II | 45 | (8) |
| 2015–2016 | Mainz 05 II | 35 | (12) |
| 2016–2018 | SV Sandhausen | 28 | (2) |
| 2018–2020 | Jahn Regensburg | 15 | (0) |
| 2019 | Jahn Regensburg II | 1 | (0) |
| 2020–2022 | Hallescher FC | 64 | (10) |
| 2022– | Mainz 05 II | 107 | (23) |

International career
| 2012–2013 | Germany U20 | 5 | (1) |
- * Club domestic league appearances and goals as of 24 September 2026

Julian-Maurice Derstroff (born 5 January 1992) is a German professional footballer who plays as a forward for Mainz 05 II. He played for 1. FC Kaiserslautern, Borussia Dortmund II, 1. FSV Mainz 05 II and SV Sandhausen before joining Regensburg.

== Career ==
Derstroff was born in Zweibrücken and made his Bundesliga debut with 1. FC Kaiserslautern on 11 February 2012 in a 2–0 away loss to Bayern Munich.
