= SV Blankenese =

German football club

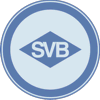
- Full name: Sportvereinigung Blankenese von 1903
- Founded: 1 October 1903
- League: Kreisliga 7 Hamburg (VIII)
- 2019–20: 5th

Spielvereinigung Blankenese von 1903 is a German football club from the district of Blankenese in Hamburg.

== History ==
The club was founded in 1903 and became one of the original members of the Stadtliga Hamburg (later Verbandsliga/Landesliga Hamburg, now Oberliga Hamburg) in 1945. SV played as an elevator club from the 1950s onward, even reaching the fourth tier by 1960. After two consecutive promotions, SV came back to the renamed Amateurliga (III) in 1963, then bounced between tiers before having a stable tenure in 1966.

In 1971 SV finished second to VfL Pinneberg and qualified for promotion to the old Regionalliga Nord (II), only to finish last in the table. In 1978 it went down to the renamed Landesliga (V) but six years later managed a comeback to the Verbandsliga (IV) for one more season before falling further to the Bezirksliga (VI) after two straight demotions. SV bounced between the fifth and sixth tiers after 1987 but moved up to the Landesliga in 1992 and the Verbandsliga (V) after three years. In 2002 the club had to leave for the Landesliga Hammonia (VI) and after staying there for 11 years, won the division title. The next two campaigns became unsuccessful, pushing the Blankenese club from the Oberliga Hamburg (V) to the Bezirksliga West (VII) where they play now.

== Honors ==
- Landesliga Hamburg-Hammonia
  - Winners (1): 2013
