= Markus Palionis =

Lithuanian footballer (born 1987)

Personal information
- Date of birth: 12 May 1987 (age 39)
- Place of birth: Kaunas, Lithuania, Soviet Union
- Height: 1.94 m (6 ft 4 in)
- Position: Defender

Team information
- Current team: FC Hansa Rostock (assistant manager)

Youth career
- 1995–1999: TSV Freilassing
- 1999–2002: TSV Bad Reichenhall
- 2002–2005: Bayern Munich
- 2005–2006: Wacker Burghausen

Senior career*
Years	Team	Apps	(Gls)
2006–2007	Wacker Burghausen II	6	(1)
2006–2008	Wacker Burghausen	43	(1)
2008–2010	Dynamo Dresden	57	(0)
2010–2014	SC Paderborn	40	(0)
2014–2021	Jahn Regensburg	83	(5)
2017–2022	Jahn Regensburg II	32	(3)
Total		261	(10)

International career
2003	Lithuania U17	2	(0)
2007	Lithuania U21	2	(0)
2008–2021	Lithuania	13	(0)
- * Club domestic league appearances and goals

Markus Palionis (born 12 May 1987) is a Lithuanian former professional footballer who played as a defender. He is currently the assistant manager of FC Hansa Rostock.

== Career ==
Born in Kaunas in the former Soviet Union, Palionis grew up in Germany and holds a German passport.

On 9 October 2014, he joined SSV Jahn Regensburg. In March 2018, he agreed a contract extension until 2020 with the club.

Palionis retired from professional playing in summer 2021. After spending one season with Jahn Regensburg II he ended his playing career.
