= Oliver Hein =

German footballer

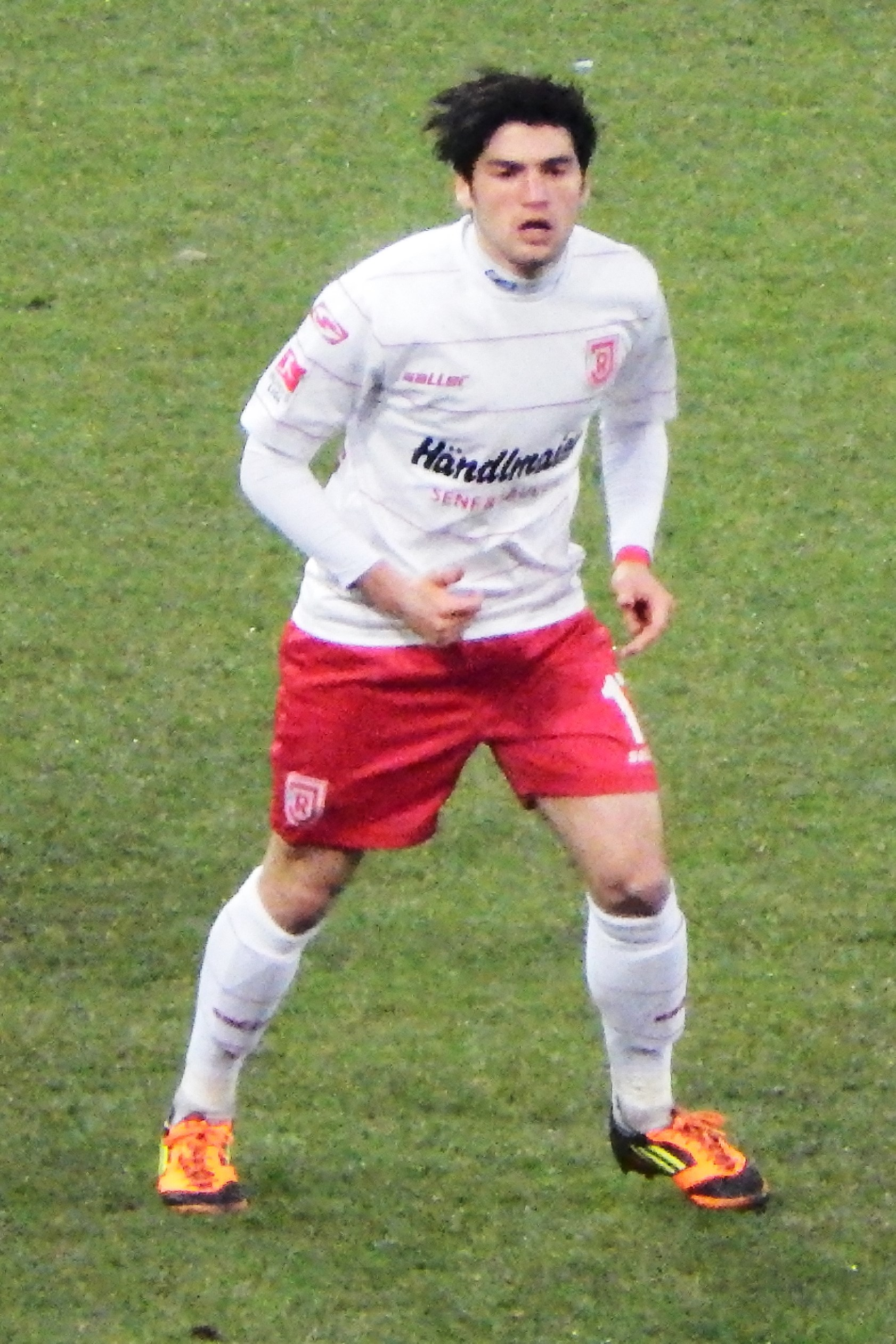
- Hein in 2013

Personal information
- Full name: Oliver Hein
- Date of birth: 20 March 1990 (age 36)
- Place of birth: Straubing, West Germany
- Height: 1.76 m (5 ft 9 in)
- Positions: Right-back; defensive midfielder

Youth career
- SV Salching
- –2007: FC Dingolfing
- 2007–2009: Jahn Regensburg

Senior career*
Years	Team	Apps	(Gls)
2009–2021	Jahn Regensburg	233	(9)
- * Club domestic league appearances and goals

Oliver Hein (born 20 March 1990) is a German former professional footballer who played as a right-back or defensive midfielder for SSV Jahn Regensburg.

== Career ==
Born in Straubing, Hein joined SSV Jahn Regensburg from FC Dingolfing in 2007. He made his professional debut for Jahn Regensburg during the 2009–10 3. Liga season in a 1–0 away loss to VfL Osnabrück.

During the 2013–14 season, manager Thomas Stratos moved him from the defensive midfield position to right-back.

In February 2020, Hein agreed a contract extension with Jahn Regensburg. He also announced his intention to retire in summer 2021 after 14 seasons with the club.
