= Sebastian Stolze =

German footballer

Personal information
- Date of birth: 29 January 1995 (age 31)
- Place of birth: Leinefelde, Germany
- Height: 1.82 m (6 ft 0 in)
- Position: Striker

Team information
- Current team: Jahn Regensburg
- Number: 22

Youth career
- SV Viktoria Kirchworbis
- –2006: SC Leinefelde 1912
- 2006–2013: Rot-Weiß Erfurt
- 2014: VfL Wolfsburg

Senior career*
Years	Team	Apps	(Gls)
2013–2014	Rot-Weiß Erfurt	13	(1)
2014–	VfL Wolfsburg II	79	(22)
2017–2018	→ Jahn Regensburg (loan)	28	(3)
2018–2021	Jahn Regensburg	82	(16)
2021–2023	Hannover 96	35	(3)
2023–2025	SV Sandhausen	66	(4)
2025–	Jahn Regensburg	28	(1)

International career^{‡}
2013–2014	Germany U19	3	(2)
2014	Germany U20	5	(1)
Medal record
Winner	European U19 Championship	2014
- * Club domestic league appearances and goals as of 14:46, 26 September 2026 (UTC) ‡ National team caps and goals as of 17:21, 15 November 2015 (UTC)

Sebastian Stolze (born 29 January 1995) is a German professional footballer who plays as a striker for Jahn Regensburg.

== Club career ==
During the 2017–18 season, he was loaned out from VfL Wolfsburg. After his loan ended, he signed a three-year contract with Regensburg.

Stolze joined Hannover 96 ahead of the 2021–22 season.

He returned to Regensburg in summer 2025 after the relegation of Sandhausen.

== International career ==
Stolze was a member of the Germany under-20 team. Previously he also played for the under-19 team, where he was part of the winning squad at the 2014 European Championships.
