= Erik Wekesser =

German footballer

Personal information
- Date of birth: 3 July 1997 (age 29)
- Place of birth: Schwetzingen, Germany
- Height: 1.86 m (6 ft 1 in)
- Positions: Left-back; left winger

Team information
- Current team: Fortuna Düsseldorf
- Number: 7

Youth career
- –2015: 1. FC Kaiserslautern

Senior career*
Years	Team	Apps	(Gls)
2015–2017	1. FC Kaiserslautern II	42	(1)
2015–2017	1. FC Kaiserslautern	0	(0)
2017–2018	TuS Koblenz	13	(0)
2018–2019	FC Astoria Walldorf	46	(17)
2019–2022	Jahn Regensburg	89	(4)
2022–2024	1. FC Nürnberg	34	(0)
2024–2026	1. FC Kaiserslautern	27	(0)
2026–	Fortuna Düsseldorf	0	(0)

International career^{‡}
2014–2015	Germany U18	6	(4)
2015	Germany U19	2	(0)
- * Club domestic league appearances and goals as of 18 May 2026 ‡ National team caps and goals as of 15 November 2015

Erik Wekesser (born 3 July 1997) is a German professional footballer who plays as a left-back or left winger for 3. Liga club Fortuna Düsseldorf.

== Career ==
Wekesser joined Jahn Regensburg in 2019.

On 2 February 2022, Wekesser agreed to join 1. FC Nürnberg for the 2022–23 season.

On 12 June 2024, Wekesser returned to 1. FC Kaiserslautern.
