= Florian Heister =

German footballer

Personal information
- Date of birth: 2 March 1997 (age 29)
- Place of birth: Neuss, Germany
- Height: 1.79 m (5 ft 10 in)
- Position: Midfielder

Team information
- Current team: Fortuna Köln
- Number: 17

Youth career
- –2011: Borussia Mönchengladbach
- 2012–2014: SC Kapellen-Erft

Senior career*
| Years | Team | Apps | (Gls) |
| 2014–2017 | Viktoria Köln | 16 | (1) |
| 2017–2019 | TSV Steinbach Haiger | 54 | (2) |
| 2019–2021 | Jahn Regensburg | 19 | (0) |
| 2021–2024 | Viktoria Köln | 38 | (0) |
| 2024–2026 | Alemannia Aachen | 54 | (0) |
| 2026– | Fortuna Köln | 0 | (0) |
- * Club domestic league appearances and goals as of 9 August 2026

Florian Heister (born 2 March 1997) is a German professional footballer who plays as a midfielder for 3. Liga club Fortuna Köln.
