= 2022–23 FC Erzgebirge Aue season =

FC Erzgebirge Aue
2022–23 season
- President: Helge Leonhardt
- Head coach: Timo Rost (until 20 September); Carsten Müller (20 September – 7 December); Pavel Dochev (from 7 December)
- Stadium: Erzgebirgsstadion
- 3. Liga: 14th
- DFB-Pokal: First round
- Saxony Cup: Quarter-final
Home colours	Away colours	Third colours

The 2022–23 FC Erzgebirge Aue season is the club's 77th season in existence and the club's first season return in the second flight of German football. In addition to the domestic league, FC Erzgebirge Aue are participating in this season's edition of the DFB-Pokal. The season covers the period from 1 July 2022 to 30 June 2023.

== Season summary ==
Timo Rost was appointed as manager of Aue at the start of the season, succeeding Pavel Dochev, but was sacked on 20 September with Aue bottom of the 3. Liga, being succeeded by interim manager Carsten Müller. Müller's spell s caretaker manager ended of 7 December when Aue reappointed Dochev. Aue finished 14th on 45 points, 8 points above relegated SV Meppen.

== Players ==
=== First-team squad ===
As of 4 February 2023

Note: Flags indicate national team as defined under FIFA eligibility rules; some limited exceptions apply. Players may hold more than one non-FIFA nationality.

No.	Pos.	Nation	Player
1	GK	GER	Martin Männel (captain)
2	MF	GER	Tim Danhof
3	MF	GER	Ulrich Taffertshofer
5	DF	GER	Korbinian Burger
6	DF	GER	Alexander Sorge
7	MF	GER	Ivan Knežević
8	MF	GER	Tom Baumgart
9	FW	GER	Antonio Jonjić
10	FW	AZE	Dimitrij Nazarov
13	MF	GER	Erik Majetschak
14	FW	UKR	Borys Tashchy
19	MF	MNE	Omar Sijarić
21	DF	GER	Marco Schikora

No.	Pos.	Nation	Player
22	FW	GER	Paul-Philipp Besong (on loan from Nürnberg)
23	DF	GER	Anthony Barylla
24	DF	GER	Steffen Nkansah
25	GK	GER	Philipp Klewin
26	DF	GER	Kilian Jakob
29	DF	GER	Linus Rosenlöcher
30	FW	GER	Maximilian Thiel
31	MF	GER	Nico Gorzel
32	FW	GER	Elias Huth
33	MF	GER	Sam Schreck
34	MF	GER	Marvin Stefaniak
36	GK	GER	Lukas Sedlak

=== Out on loan ===
Note: Flags indicate national team as defined under FIFA eligibility rules; some limited exceptions apply. Players may hold more than one non-FIFA nationality.

No. / Pos. / Nation / Player; — / DF / TUN / Ramzi Ferjani (at Wormatia Worms until 30 June 2023)	No. / Pos. / Nation / Player; — / DF / GER / Felix Göttlicher (at Würzburger Kickers until 30 June 2023)

== Friendly matches ==
Pre-season match details
Date	Time	Opponent	Venue	Result F–A	Scorers	Attendance	Ref.
26 June 2022	14:00	Berliner AK 07	Home	4–0	Klar 11' (o.g.), Huth 18', Göttlicher 85', Burger 90' (pen.)		
2 July 2022	18:30	Lokomotive Leipzig	Home	4–0	Nazarov 20', Jastremski 50', Barylla 74', 79'		
3 July 2022	14:30	SV Leukersdorf	Away	29–0	Rosenlöcher 5', Besong 7', 27', 32', 34', 40', Nazarov 8', 22', 36', Huth 9', 31', o.g. 37', Gorzel 38', Sorge 43', Hache 51', Jastremski 52', 55', 57', 60', 70', 84', 86', 88' Baumgart 62', 67', 74', 80' (pen.), Danhof 78', 79'		
9 July 2022	14:00	Greuther Fürth II	Home	2–2	Huth 23', Baumgart 88'		
13 July 2022	17:30	ZFC Meuselwitz	Away	3–2	Nazarov 3', 36', Stefaniak 29'	759	
11 December 2022	13:00	Hallescher FC	Home	1–0	Jastremski 21'		
5 January 2023	12:30	VfB Oldenburg	Neutral (Note: Match played in Harsewinkel.)	5–1	Stefaniak 2', 46', Sijarić 19', 44', Tashchy 75'		
7 January 2023	14:00	1. FC Nürnberg	Away (Note: Match played at Sportpark Valznerweiher.)	3–3	Huth 36', Jastremski 69', Nazarov 84'		
10 January 2023	13:00	Energie Cottbus	Home	3–1	Jonjić 12', Stefaniak 61', Huth 76' (pen.)		

== Competitions ==
=== 3. Liga ===
==== League table ====
Pos	Team	Pld	W	D	L	GF	GA	GD	Pts
12	MSV Duisburg	38	11	13	14	54	58	−4	46
13	Borussia Dortmund II (Note: Reserve teams are ineligible for promotion or DFB-Pokal qualification.)	38	13	6	19	47	49	−2	45
14	Erzgebirge Aue	38	12	9	17	49	62	−13	45
15	Rot-Weiss Essen	38	9	15	14	43	56	−13	42
16	Hallescher FC	38	10	11	17	49	60	−11	41

Source: DFB
Rules for classification: 1) Points; 2) Goal difference; 3) Goals scored; 4) Head-to-head results; 5) Head-to-head away goals scored; 6) Away goals scored; 7) Play-off.

==== Matches ====
The league fixtures were announced on 24 June 2022.

3. Liga match details
Match	Date	Time	Opponent	Venue	Result F–A	Scorers	Attendance	Referee	Ref.
1	24 July 2022	13:00	SC Freiburg II	Away	1–1	Stefaniak 3'	2,400	Exner	
2	7 August 2022	14:00	VfL Osnabrück	Home	1–1	Stefaniak 16'	7,775	Haslberger	
3	10 August 2022	19:00	Waldhof Mannheim	Away	0–1		7,468	Welz	
4	14 August 2022	14:00	Wehen Wiesbaden	Home	1–5	Thiel 76'	6,304	Kampka	
5	20 August 2022	14:00	1. FC Saarbrücken	Away	0–0		9,458	Braun	
6	28 August 2022	14:00	Dynamo Dresden	Home	0–1		12,983	Badstübner	
7	2 September 2022	19:00	Rot-Weiss Essen	Away	1–2	Schreck 55'	16,070	Eckermann	
8	11 September 2022	14:00	FSV Zwickau	Home	0–1		11,538	Aytekin	
9	16 September 2022	19:00	1860 Munich	Away	1–3	Schikora 90'	15,000	Alt	
10	30 September 2022	19:00	SV Meppen	Home	3–0	Baumgart 31', Nazarov 45', Nkansah 49'	5,480	Sather	
11	8 October 2022	14:00	VfB Oldenburg	Away	3–1	Baumgart 15', Jastremski 54', Danhof 90'	4,650	Gansloweit	
12	14 October 2022	19:00	Hallescher FC	Home	1–1	Schreck 88'	10,214	Hanslbauer	
13	23 October 2022	14:00	SC Verl	Away	2–3	Stefaniak 4', Tashchy 82'	1,175	Kessel	
14	29 October 2022	14:00	SV Elversberg	Home	1–1	Besong 60'	6,733	Greif	
15	5 November 2022	14:00	Viktoria Köln	Away	0–3		2,862	Erbst	
16	8 November 2022	19:00	MSV Duisburg	Home	0–2		6,313	Speckner	
17	11 November 2022	19:00	Borussia Dortmund II	Away	1–0	Schikora 46'	1,306	Nouhoum	
18	16 January 2023	19:00	FC Ingolstadt	Away	2–1	Jonjić 45', Nazarov 67' (pen.)	4,283	Hartmann	
19	21 January 2023	14:00	SpVgg Bayreuth	Home	4–0	Jonjić 23', Burger 38', Besong 45', Nazarov 76'	7,378	Cortus	
20	28 January 2023	14:00	SC Freiburg II	Home	0–0		6,019	Benen	
21	4 February 2023	14:00	VfL Osnabrück	Away	1–3	Nazarov 21' (pen.)	12,827	Lechner	
22	10 February 2023	19:00	Waldhof Mannheim	Home	2–1	Sijarić 20', Jonjić 40'	7,200	Schultes	
23	17 February 2023	19:00	Wehen Wiesbaden	Away	2–1	Schikora 33', Jonjić 65'	3,751	Haslberger	
24	26 February 2023	14:00	1. FC Saarbrücken	Home	2–1	Nazarov 48', Jonjić 80'	7,161	Stegemann	
25	4 March 2023	14:00	Dynamo Dresden	Away	0–1		30,808	Welz	
26	11 March 2023	14:00	Rot-Weiss Essen	Home	2–1	Nazarov 22' (pen.), 30' (pen.)	7,076	Bauer	
27	14 March 2023	19:00	FSV Zwickau	Away	2–0	Nazarov 62', Tashchy 90'	8,771	Heft	
28	18 March 2023	14:00	1860 Munich	Home	1–3	Besong 71'	10,896	Oldhafer	
29	25 March 2023	14:00	SV Meppen	Away	2–3	Schreck 5', Sijarić 65'	6,798	Storks	
30	1 April 2023	14:00	VfB Oldenburg	Home	1–0	Nazarov 80' (pen.)	5,827	Exner	
31	8 April 2023	14:00	Hallescher FC	Away	2–5	Majetschak 6', Stefaniak 22'	10,756	Alt	
32	15 April 2023	14:00	SC Verl	Home	2–3	Barylla 50', Tashchy 82' (pen.)	5,865	Fuchs	
33	22 April 2023	14:00	SV Elversberg	Away	1–0	Sijarić 74'	5,828	Nouhoum	
34	29 April 2023	14:00	Viktoria Köln	Home	1–1	Nazarov 82' (pen.)	6,340	Wildfeuer	
35	5 May 2023	19:00	MSV Duisburg	Away	0–3		11,999	Gansloweit	
36	15 May 2023	19:00	Borussia Dortmund II	Home	3–3	Besong 26', 85', Tashchy 62'	7,203	Nouhoum	
37	20 May 2023	14:00	FC Ingolstadt	Home	0–3		9,421	Eckermann	
38	27 May 2023	13:30	SpVgg Bayreuth	Away	3–3	Stefaniak 39', Tashchy 84', 90'	5,314	Jürgensen	

=== DFB-Pokal ===
DFB-Pokal match details
Round	Date	Time	Opponent	Venue	Result F–A	Scorers	Attendance	Referee	Ref.
First round	31 July 2022	18:01	Mainz 05	Home	0–3		8,446	Aytekin	

=== Saxony Cup ===
Saxony Cup match details
Round	Date	Time	Opponent	Venue	Result F–A	Scorers	Attendance	Ref.
Third round	25 September 2022	16:00	FC Eilenburg	Away	2–1	Thiel 2', Baumgart 29'		
Fourth round	19 November 2022	14:00	Budissa Bautzen	Away	4–0	Knežević, Huth (2), Jastremski		
Quarter-final	22 March 2023	20:20	Chemnitzer FC	Away	0–3		14,000	
