= 2023–24 FC Erzgebirge Aue season =

FC Erzgebirge Aue
2023–24 season
- President: Helge Leonhardt
- Head coach: Pavel Dochev
- Stadium: Erzgebirgsstadion
- 3. Liga: 6th
- Saxony Cup: Runners-up
- Top goalscorer: League: Marcel Bär (7); All: Marcel Bär (7)

The 2023–24 season was FC Erzgebirge Aue's 99th season in existence and second consecutive in the 3. Liga. They also competed in the Saxony Cup.

== Players ==
=== First-team squad ===
As of 1 September 2023

Note: Flags indicate national team as defined under FIFA eligibility rules; some limited exceptions apply. Players may hold more than one non-FIFA nationality.

No.	Pos.	Nation	Player
1	GK	GER	Martin Männel (captain)
2	MF	GER	Tim Danhof
4	DF	GER	Niko Vukancic
5	DF	GER	Korbinian Burger
7	FW	GER	Sean Seitz
8	MF	GER	Joshua Schwirten
9	MF	GER	Steffen Meuer
10	MF	MNE	Mirnes Pepić
11	MF	MNE	Omar Sijarić
12	MF	GER	Franco Schädlich
13	MF	GER	Erik Majetschak
14	FW	UKR	Borys Tashchy
15	FW	GER	Marcel Bär

No.	Pos.	Nation	Player
16	MF	GER	Finn Hetzsch
17	FW	GER	Luc Thomas Elsner
21	DF	GER	Marco Schikora
22	GK	GER	Louis Lord
23	DF	GER	Anthony Barylla
24	DF	GER	Steffen Nkansah
25	GK	LUX	Tim Kips
26	DF	GER	Kilian Jakob
29	DF	GER	Linus Rosenlöcher
30	FW	GER	Maximilian Thiel
34	MF	GER	Marvin Stefaniak
36	GK	GER	Max Uhlig
40	DF	TUN	Ramzi Ferjani

== Transfers ==
=== In ===
Pos.	Player	Transferred from	Fee	Date	Source

=== Out ===
Pos.	Player	Transferred to	Fee	Date	Source

== Pre-season and friendlies ==
Win Draw Loss Fixtures

1 July 2023 Friendly	SV Erlbach (Germany)	1–10	(Germany) Erzgebirge Aue
15:00 CEST (UTC+2)

2 July 2023 Friendly	Fortschritt Lunzenau (Germany)	0–20	(Germany) Erzgebirge Aue
15:00 CEST (UTC+2)

7 July 2023 Friendly	Lokomotive Leipzig (Germany)	1–0	(Germany) Erzgebirge Aue
19:00 CEST (UTC+2)

15 July 2023 Friendly	Erzgebirge Aue (Germany)	2–1	(Poland) Śląsk Wrocław
14:00 CEST (UTC+2)

19 July 2023 Friendly	Erzgebirge Aue (Germany)	2–1	(Germany) Carl Zeiss Jena
17:00 CEST (UTC+2)

22 July 2023 Friendly	BSG Chemie Leipzig (Germany)	0–1	(Germany) Erzgebirge Aue
15:00 CEST (UTC+2)

29 July 2023 Friendly	1. FC Köln (Germany)	2–0	(Germany) Erzgebirge Aue	Euskirchen
14:00 CEST (UTC+2)	Waldschmidt 6'; Selke 17'			Stadium: Erftstadion Euskirchen; Attendance: 3,200

30 July 2023 Friendly	Fortuna Düsseldorf (Germany)	1–2	(Germany) Erzgebirge Aue	Düsseldorf
11:00 CEST (UTC+2)				Stadium: Trainingsplatz im Arena-Sportpark; Attendance: 0

11 August 2023 Friendly	Erzgebirge Aue (Germany)	4–0	(Germany) VfB Auerbach
19:00 CEST (UTC+2)

7 September 2023 Friendly	1. FC Magdeburg (Germany)	1–1	(Germany) Erzgebirge Aue	Magdeburg
12:00 CEST (UTC+2)	Castaignos 41' (pen.)		Schwirten 15'	Stadium: Platz 2 MCDD-Arena

6 January 2024 Friendly	Hertha BSC (Germany)	v	(Germany) Erzgebirge Aue	Berlin
14:00 CET (UTC+1)				Stadium: Stadion auf dem Wurfplatz

== Competitions ==
=== Overall record ===
Competition	First match	Last match	Starting round	Record							
Competition	First match	Last match	Starting round	Pld	W	D	L	GF	GA	GD	Win %
3. Liga	6 August 2023	18 May 2024	Matchday 1	15	6	4	5	18	18	+0	40.00
Saxony Cup	31 October 2023		Third round	1	1	0	0	4	0	+4	100.00
Total				16	7	4	5	22	18	+4	43.75

Last updated: 12 November 2023
Source: Soccerway

=== 3. Liga ===
==== League table ====
Pos	Team	Pld	W	D	L	GF	GA	GD	Pts	Promotion, qualification or relegation
4	Dynamo Dresden	38	19	5	14	58	40	+18	62	Qualification for DFB-Pokal
5	1. FC Saarbrücken	38	15	15	8	60	43	+17	60	
6	Erzgebirge Aue	38	16	12	10	51	47	+4	60	
7	Rot-Weiss Essen	38	17	8	13	60	53	+7	59	
8	SV Sandhausen	38	15	11	12	58	57	+1	56	

Source: DFB
Rules for classification: 1) Points; 2) Goal difference; 3) Goals scored; 4) Head-to-head results; 5) Head-to-head away goals scored; 6) Away goals scored; 7) Play-off.

==== Results summary ====
Overall								Home						Away					
Pld	W	D	L	GF	GA	GD	Pts	W	D	L	GF	GA	GD	W	D	L	GF	GA	GD
15	6	4	5	18	18	0	22	4	0	3	10	7	+3	2	4	2	8	11	−3

Last updated: 12 November 2023.

==== Results by round ====
Round	1	2	3	4	5	6	7	8	9	10	11	12	13	14	15
Ground	H	A	H	A	A	H	A	H	A	H	A	H	A	H	A
Result	W	D	W	D	W	W	L	L	L	W	D	L	W	L	D
Position	5	5	2	3	2	2	3	2	9	4	4	5	4	7	7

Updated to match(es) played on 12 November 2023. Source:
A = Away; H = Home; W = Win; D = Draw; L = Loss

==== Matches ====
The league fixtures were unveiled on 7 July 2023.

6 August 2023 1	Erzgebirge Aue	1–0	FC Ingolstadt	Aue
19:30 CEST (UTC+2)	Thiel 90'	Report		Stadium: Erzgebirgsstadion; Attendance: 10,343; Referee: Lukas Benen

20 August 2023 2	Rot-Weiss Essen	1–1	Erzgebirge Aue	Essen
19:30 CEST (UTC+2)	Müsel 30'	Report	Seitz 17'	Stadium: Stadion an der Hafenstraße; Attendance: 15,117; Referee: Patrick Schwengers

23 August 2023 3	Erzgebirge Aue	2–1	SV Sandhausen	Aue
19:00 CEST (UTC+2)	Seitz 4'; Schwirten 86'	Report	Otto 6'	Stadium: Erzgebirgsstadion; Attendance: 7,500; Referee: Michael Bacher

26 August 2023 4	VfB Lübeck	1–1	Erzgebirge Aue	Lübeck
14:00 UTC+2	Akono 53'	Report	Stefaniak 73' (pen.)	Stadium: Stadion an der Lohmühle; Attendance: 5,292; Referee: Daniel Bartnitzki

2 September 2023 5	1860 Munich	1–2	Erzgebirge Aue	Munich
14:00 UTC+2	Zwarts 54'	Report	Bär 85'; Thiel 87'	Stadium: Stadion an der Grünwalder Straße; Attendance: 15,000; Referee: Eric Weisbach

17 September 2023 6	Erzgebirge Aue	3–1	Hallescher FC	Aue
13:30 UTC+2	Meuer 62'; Schwirten 79'; Bär 90+6'	Report	Baumann 25'	Stadium: Erzgebirgsstadion; Attendance: 13,654; Referee: Cristian Ballweg

24 September 2023 7	Dynamo Dresden	2–1	Erzgebirge Aue	Dresden
19:30 UTC+2	Vukančić 9' (o.g.); Borkowski 84'	Report	Bär 90+4'	Stadium: Rudolf-Harbig-Stadion; Attendance: 31,834; Referee: Harm Osmers

1 October 2023 8	Erzgebirge Aue	0–1	Jahn Regensburg	Aue
19:30 UTC+2		Report	Ziegele 75'	Stadium: Erzgebirgsstadion; Attendance: 7,533; Referee: Robert Kampka

4 October 2023 9	Preußen Münster	4–0	Erzgebirge Aue	Münster
19:00 UTC+2	Kyerewaa 12'; Batmaz 34', 51', 69'	Report		Stadium: Preußenstadion; Attendance: 9,396; Referee: Fabienne Michel

7 October 2023 10	Erzgebirge Aue	2–0	1. FC Saarbrücken	Aue
16:30 UTC+2	Tashchy 65'; Seitz 74'	Report		Stadium: Erzgebirgsstadion; Attendance: 8,006; Referee: Timo Gansloweit

14 October 2023 11	Viktoria Köln	2–2	Erzgebirge Aue	Cologne
14:00 UTC+2	Marseiler 46'; Becker 90+3'	Report	Stefaniak 70'; Danhof 75'	Stadium: Sportpark Höhenberg; Attendance: 4,099; Referee: Mario Hildenbrand

22 October 2023 12	Erzgebirge Aue	1–2	SSV Ulm 1846	Aue
19:30 UTC+2	Bär 1'	Report	Weschenfelder-Scienza 48'; Maier 64'	Stadium: Erzgebirgsstadion; Attendance: 8,106; Referee: Patrick Kessel

29 October 2023 13	SC Freiburg II	0–1	Erzgebirge Aue	Freiburg
19:30 UTC+1		Report	Majetschak 34'	Stadium: Dreisamstadion; Attendance: 1,938; Referee: Cristian Ballweg

3 November 2023 14	Erzgebirge Aue	1–2	SC Verl	Aue
19:00 UTC+1	Stefaniak 66'	Report	Wolfram 89'; Corboz 90+1'	Stadium: Erzgebirgsstadion; Attendance: 7,703; Referee: Felix Weller

11 November 2023 15	SpVgg Unterhaching	0–0	Erzgebirge Aue	Unterhaching
14:00 UTC+1		Report		Stadium: Sportpark Unterhaching; Attendance: 5,000; Referee: Lukas Benen

=== Saxony Cup ===
31 October 2023 Third round	BSG Stahl Riesa	0–4	Erzgebirge Aue	Riesa
13:00 CET (UTC+1)			Thiel 12', 40'; Ferjani 60'; Kallenbach 66'	Stadium: Feralpi-Arena; Referee: Ronny Walter

17 November 2023 Round of 16	SSV Markranstädt	v	Erzgebirge Aue	Markranstädt
18:00 CET (UTC+1)				Stadium: Stadion am Bad
