= 2021–22 FC Erzgebirge Aue season =

Erzgebirge Aue
2021–22 season
- Manager: Aleksey Shpilevsky (until September 2021); Marc Hensel and Carsten Müller (September 2021 – February 2022); Pavel Dochev (from February 2022)
- Stadium: Erzgebirgsstadion
- 2. Bundesliga: 17th (relegated)
- DFB-Pokal: First round

The 2021–22 season is FC Erzgebirge Aue's 76th season in existence and the club's 6th consecutive season in the 2. Bundesliga, the second tier of German football. The club will also participate in the DFB-Pokal.

== Background ==
Erzgebirge Aue finished the 2020–21 season in 12th place in the 2. Bundesliga on 44 points. Manager Dirk Schuster left the club in May 2021, and was replaced by Aleksey Shpilevsky the following month.

== Season summary ==
Manager Shiplevsky was sacked after 7 matches in September 2021, being replaced by the interim coaching duo of Marc Hensel and Carsten Müller. Sporting director Pavel Dochev took over as head coach in February 2022.

== Friendly matches ==
Pre-season match details
Date	Time	Opponent	Venue	Result F–A	Scorers	Attendance	Ref.
1 July 2021	19:00	Eintracht Bamberg		5–0	Hochscheidt 13', Nazarov 60', 63' (pen.), Jonjic 73', Zolinski 78'		
3 July 2021	14:30	Greuther Fürth II		3–0	Zolinski 20', 30', Kühn 45'		
6 July 2021	16:00	VfL Wolfsburg	Away (Note: Match played at AOK-Stadion.)	1–2	Messeguem 88'	390	
10 July 2021	14:00	1. FC Magdeburg	Home	1–2	Zolinksi 90+1'		
4 September 2021	14:00	Hallescher FC	Home	6–0	Gueye 6', Mance 37', Trujic 52', 55', Schreck 62', Nazarov 77'	0	

== Competitions ==
=== 2. Bundesliga ===
==== League table ====
Pos	Team	Pld	W	D	L	GF	GA	GD	Pts	Promotion, qualification or relegation
14	SV Sandhausen	34	10	11	13	42	54	−12	41	
15	Jahn Regensburg	34	10	10	14	50	51	−1	40	
16	Dynamo Dresden (R)	34	7	11	16	33	46	−13	32	Qualification for relegation play-offs
17	Erzgebirge Aue (R)	34	6	8	20	32	72	−40	26	Relegation to 3. Liga
18	FC Ingolstadt (R)	34	4	9	21	30	65	−35	21	Relegation to 3. Liga

Source: DFB
Rules for classification: 1) Points; 2) Goal difference; 3) Goals scored; 4) Head-to-head points; 5) Head-to-head goal difference; 6) Head-to-head away goals scored; 7) Away goals scored; 8) Play-off.
(R) Relegated

==== Matches ====
2. Bundesliga match details
Match	Date	Time	Opponent	Venue	Result F–A	Scorers	Attendance	League position	Ref.
1	25 July 2021	13:30	1. FC Nürnberg	Away	0–0	—	11,089	9th	
2	1 August 2021	13:30	FC St. Pauli	Home	0–0	—	6,828	13th	
3	13 August 2021	18:30	Schalke 04	Away	1–1	Härtel 86'	20,126	13th	
4	22 August 2021	13:30	SV Sandhausen	Home	1–3	Guèye 65'	6,600	16th	
5	28 August 2021	13:30	Holstein Kiel	Away	0–3	—	3,848	18th	
6	12 September 2021	13:30	Fortuna Düsseldorf	Home	0–1	—	6,064	18th	
7	19 September 2021	13:30	SC Paderborn	Home	1–4	Gueye 51'	5,150	18th	
8	24 September 2021	18:30	Jahn Regensburg	Away	2–3	Kühn 52', Bussmann 87'	8,127	18th	
9	1 October 2021	18:30	Hamburger SV	Home	1–1	Jonjic 23'	7,750	17th	
10	16 October 2021	13:30	Karlsruher SC	Away	1–2	Barylla 83'	12,000	18th	
11	22 October 2021	18:30	FC Ingolstadt	Home	1–0	Sijarić 62'	7,349	17th	
12	30 October 2021	13:30	Hannover 96	Away	1–1	Nazarov 45+1'	9,300	17th	
13	7 November 2021	13:30	1. FC Heidenheim	Home	2–0	Jonjic 34', 45'	6,899	17th	
14	20 November 2021	13:30	Hansa Rostock	Away	2–1	Kühn 19', Jonjic 66'	21,750	14th	
15	27 November 2021	13:30	Darmstadt 98	Home	1–2	Jonjic 85'	0 (Note: Match played behind closed doors.)	15th	
16	3 December 2021	18:30	Werder Bremen	Away	0–4	—	15,024	16th	
17	12 December 2021	13:30	Dynamo Dresden	Home	0–1	—	0	16th	
18	18 December 2021	13:30	1. FC Nürnberg	Home	1–3	Hochscheidt 8'	0	17th	
19	15 January 2022	13:30	FC St. Pauli	Away	2–2	Zolinski 17', Trujić 72'	1,724	17th	
20	22 January 2022	20:30	Schalke 04	Home	0–5	—	1,000	17th	
21	5 February 2022	13:30	SV Sandhausen	Away	0–2	—	3,246	17th	
22	11 February 2022	18:30	Holstein Kiel	Home	2–3	Trujić 79', Hochscheidt 84'	4,788	17th	
23	20 February 2022	13:30	Fortuna Düsseldorf	Away	1–3	Owusu 77'	10,000	18th	
24	25 February 2022	18:30	SC Paderborn	Away	3–3	Nazarov 63' pen., Zolinski 65', 70' pen.	3,319	17th	
25	6 March 2022	13:30	Jahn Regensburg	Home	1–0	Owusu 23'	6,268	17th	
27	18 March 2022	18:30	Karlsruher SC	Home	0–3	—	6,619	17th	
28	1 April 2022	18:30	FC Ingolstadt	Away	2–3	Jonjic 69', Gonther 89'	4,189	17th	
26	5 April 2022	18:30	Hamburger SV	Away	0–4	—	21,890	17th	
29	9 April 2022	13:30	Hannover 96	Home	1–3	Trujić 54'	6,196	18th	
30	17 April 2022	13:30	1. FC Heidenheim	Away	2–0	Zolinski 54', 79'	7,768	17th	
31	24 April 2022	13:30	Hansa Rostock	Home	2–2	Fröde 8' o.g., Nazarov 45'	10,929	17th	
32	30 April 2022	20:30	Darmstadt 98	Away	0–6	—	13,850	17th	
33	8 May 2022	13:30	Werder Bremen	Home	0–3	—	12,273	17th	
34	15 May 2022	15:30	Dynamo Dresden	Away	1–0	Kühn 53'	29,382	17th	

=== DFB-Pokal ===
DFB-Pokal match details
Round	Date	Time	Opponent	Venue	Result F–A	Scorers	Attendance	Ref.
First round	9 August 2021	18:30	FC Ingolstadt	Away	1–2	Zolinski 67'	3,322	

== Transfers ==
=== Transfers in ===
Date	Position	Name	Previous club (Note: Brackets around club names denote the player's contract with that club had expired before he joined Erzgebirge Aue)	Fee	Ref.
1 July 2021	DF	Anthony Barylla	(1. FC Saarbrücken)	Free	
1 July 2021	DF	Ramzi Ferjani	(FC Nitra)	Free	
1 July 2021	MF	Soufiane Messeguem	(VfL Wolfsburg II)	Free	
5 July 2021	DF	Dirk Carlson	Karlsruher SC	Undisclosed	
15 July 2021	GK	Tim Kips	F91 Dudelange	Undisclosed	
15 July 2021	FW	Omar Sijarić	Türkgücü München	Undisclosed	

=== Loans in ===
Date	Position	Name	Club	Return	Ref.
29 June 2021	FW	Nicolas Kühn	Bayern Munich	End of season	
28 July 2021	FW	Sam Schreck	FC Groningen	End of season	
25 August 2021	FW	Antonio Mance	NK Osijek	End of season	

=== Transfers out ===
Date	Position	Name	Subsequent club (Note: Brackets around club names denote the player joined that club after his contract with Erzgebirge Aue expired)	Fee	Ref.
23 June 2021	FW	Florian Krüger	Arminia Bielefeld	€1,000,000	
30 June 2021	DF	Steve Breitkreuz	(Jahn Regensburg)	Released	
30 June 2021	GK	Kevin Harr		Released	
30 June 2021	DF	Calogero Rizzuto		Released	
30 June 2021	MF	Louis Samson	(Hallescher FC)	Released	
8 July 2021	FW	Pascal Testroet	SV Sandhausen	Undisclosed	

=== Loans out ===
Date	Position	Name	Club	Return	Ref.
