= 2020–21 1. FC Nürnberg season =

1. FC Nürnberg
2020–21 season
- Board Member: Dieter Hecking (sports); Niels Rossow (financial)
- Head coach: Robert Klauß
- Stadium: Max-Morlock-Stadion
- 2. Bundesliga: 11th
- DFB-Pokal: First round
- Top goalscorer: League: Manuel Schäffler (10); All: Manuel Schäffler (10)
Home colours	Away colours	Third colours

The 2020–21 1. FC Nürnberg season was the club's 121st season in existence and the club's 2nd consecutive season in the second flight of German football. In addition to the domestic league, 1. FC Nürnberg participated in this season's edition of the DFB-Pokal. The season covers the period from 12 July 2020 to 30 June 2021.

== Players ==
=== Current squad ===
As of 31 January 2021

Note: Flags indicate national team as defined under FIFA eligibility rules; some limited exceptions apply. Players may hold more than one non-FIFA nationality.

No.	Pos.	Nation	Player
1	GK	(Germany) GER	Patric Klandt
4	DF	(Denmark) DEN	Asger Sørensen
5	MF	(Germany) GER	Johannes Geis
6	DF	(Germany) GER	Tim Handwerker
7	FW	(Germany) GER	Felix Lohkemper
9	FW	(Germany) GER	Manuel Schäffler
10	MF	(Austria) AUT	Nikola Dovedan
13	DF	(Germany) GER	Pius Krätschmer
14	MF	(Germany) GER	Tom Krauß (on loan from RB Leipzig)
15	MF	(Germany) GER	Fabian Nürnberger
17	MF	(Germany) GER	Robin Hack
18	MF	(Germany) GER	Hanno Behrens
19	FW	(Germany) GER	Dennis Borkowski (on loan from RB Leipzig)
20	FW	(Germany) GER	Pascal Köpke
21	DF	(Germany) GER	Kevin Goden

No.	Pos.	Nation	Player
22	DF	(Germany) GER	Enrico Valentini (captain)
23	FW	(Germany) GER	Fabian Schleusener
24	MF	(Norway) NOR	Mats Møller Dæhli (on loan from KRC Genk)
25	DF	(Germany) GER	Oliver Sorg
26	GK	(Germany) GER	Christian Mathenia
27	FW	(Germany) GER	Paul-Philipp Besong
28	DF	(Germany) GER	Lukas Mühl
29	GK	(Germany) GER	Christian Früchtl (on loan from Bayern Munich)
30	GK	(Austria) AUT	Andreas Lukse
33	DF	(Austria) AUT	Georg Margreitter (vice-captain)
35	DF	(Germany) GER	Noel Knothe
40	DF	(Germany) GER	Linus Rosenlöcher
43	MF	(Germany) GER	Tim Latteier
44	FW	(Ukraine) UKR	Erik Shuranov

=== Out on loan ===
Note: Flags indicate national team as defined under FIFA eligibility rules; some limited exceptions apply. Players may hold more than one non-FIFA nationality.

No.	Pos.	Nation	Player
—	MF	(Slovenia) SVN	Adam Gnezda Čerin (at HNK Rijeka until 30 June 2021)
—	DF	(Croatia) CRO	Jakov Medić (at Wehen Wiesbaden until 30 June 2021)
—	FW	(Poland) POL	Dominik Steczyk (at Piast Gliwice until 30 June 2021)
—	MF	(Portugal) POR	Iuri Medeiros (at S.C. Braga until 30 June 2021)
—	FW	(Germany) GER	Lukas Schleimer (at 1. FC Saarbrücken until 30 June 2021)

== Pre-season and friendlies ==
Win Draw Loss Fixtures

11 August 2020 Friendly	Jahn Regensburg	0–1	1. FC Nürnberg	Regensburg, Germany
17:00 CEST (UTC+2)		Report		Stadium: Sportpark Kaulbachweg; Attendance: 0 Referee: Martin Speckner

15 August 2020 Friendly	1. FC Nürnberg	1–2	FC Augsburg	Nuremberg, Germany
15:30 CEST (UTC+2)		Report		Stadium: Max-Morlock-Stadion; Attendance: 0

22 August 2020 Friendly	1. FC Nürnberg	5–2	1899 Hoffenheim	Rottach-Egern, Germany
17:00 CEST (UTC+2)		Report		Stadium: Stadion am Birkenmoos; Attendance: 0

29 August 2020 Friendly	Türkgücü München	1–2	1. FC Nürnberg	Rosenheim, Germany
16:00 CEST (UTC+2)		Report		Stadium: Jahnstadion; Attendance: 0 Referee: Michael Bacher

5 September 2020 Friendly	Union Berlin	2–1	1. FC Nürnberg	Berlin, Germany
17:30 CEST (UTC+2)		Report		Stadium: Stadion An der Alten Försterei; Attendance: 4,500; Referee: Daniel Siebert

9 October 2020 Friendly	1. FC Nürnberg	2–0	Jahn Regensburg	Nuremberg, Germany
13:00 CEST (UTC+2)		Report		Stadium: Max-Morlock-Platz; Attendance: 0

12 November 2020 Friendly	Eintracht Frankfurt	0–2	1. FC Nürnberg	Frankfurt, Germany
14:00 CET (UTC+1)		Report	Geis 47'; Lohkemper 86'	Stadium: Trainingsgelände am Waldstadion; Attendance: 0

25 March 2021 Friendly	Mainz 05	2–2	1. FC Nürnberg	Mainz, Germany
14:00 CET (UTC+1)	Hack 10'; Mustapha 54'	Report	Dovedan 33'; Schleusener 59'	Stadium: Stadion am Bruchweg

== Competitions ==
=== Overview ===
Competition	First match	Last match	Starting round	Final position	Record							
Competition	First match	Last match	Starting round	Final position	Pld	W	D	L	GF	GA	GD	Win %
2. Bundesliga	18 September 2020	23 May 2021	Matchday 1	11th	34	11	11	12	46	51	−5	32.35
DFB-Pokal	12 September 2020	12 September 2020	First round	First round	1	0	0	1	0	3	−3	0.00
Total					35	11	11	13	46	54	−8	31.43

Last updated: 27 March 2021
Source: Competitions

=== 2. Bundesliga ===
==== League table ====
Pos	Team	Pld	W	D	L	GF	GA	GD	Pts
9	SC Paderborn	34	12	11	11	53	45	+8	47
10	FC St. Pauli	34	13	8	13	51	56	−5	47
11	1. FC Nürnberg	34	11	11	12	46	51	−5	44
12	Erzgebirge Aue	34	12	8	14	44	53	−9	44
13	Hannover 96	34	12	6	16	53	51	+2	42

Source: DFB
Rules for classification: 1) Points; 2) Goal difference; 3) Goals scored; 4) Head-to-head points; 5) Head-to-head goal difference; 6) Head-to-head away goals scored; 7) Away goals scored; 8) Play-off.

==== Results summary ====
Overall								Home						Away					
Pld	W	D	L	GF	GA	GD	Pts	W	D	L	GF	GA	GD	W	D	L	GF	GA	GD
34	11	11	12	46	51	−5	44	5	7	5	22	23	−1	6	4	7	24	28	−4

Last updated: March 2021.

==== Results by round ====
Round	1	2	3	4	5	6	7	8	9	10	11	12	13	14	15	16	17	18	19	20	21	22	23	24	25	26	27	28	29	30	31	32	33	34
Ground	A	H	H	A	H	A	H	A	H	A	H	A	H	A	H	A	H	H	A	A	H	A	H	A	H	A	H	A	H	A	H	A	H	A
Result	D	W	L	D	D	L	D	W	L	W	W	L	W	L	D	L	L	L	L	W	L	W	D	L	D	D	W	D	D	W	W	L	D	W
Position	9	6	11	9	12	15	16	10	13	12	8	9	7	11	12	12	12	14	14	12	14	12	13	14	14	14	13	13	13	13	12	12	12	11

Updated to match(es) played on September 2020. Source:
A = Away; H = Home; W = Win; D = Draw; L = Loss

==== Matches ====
18 September 2020 1	Jahn Regensburg	1–1	1. FC Nürnberg	Regensburg
18:30	Besuschkow 58' (pen.)	Report	Handwerker 43'	Stadium: Jahnstadion Regensburg; Attendance: 3,011; Referee: Matthias Jöllenbeck; Man of the Match: Hein

27 September 2020 2	1. FC Nürnberg	1–0	SV Sandhausen	Nuremberg
13:30	Mühl 77'	Report		Stadium: Max-Morlock-Stadion; Attendance: 6,505; Referee: Tobias Reichel; Man of the Match: Fraisl

5 October 2020 3	1. FC Nürnberg	2–3	SV Darmstadt 98	Nuremberg
20:30	Hack 3'; Lohkemper 61'	Report	Dursun 56'; Mehlem 76'; Rapp 90+3'	Stadium: Max-Morlock-Stadion; Attendance: 6,772; Referee: Sören Storks; Man of the Match: Mehlem

19 October 2020 4	FC St. Pauli	2–2	1. FC Nürnberg	Hamburg
20:30	Zalazar 28' (pen.); Buballa 78'	Report	Schäffler 8'; Geis 49' (pen.)	Stadium: Millerntor-Stadion; Attendance: 1,000; Referee: Florian Heft; Man of the Match: Zalazar

23 October 2020 5	1. FC Nürnberg	1–1	Karlsruher SC	Nuremberg
18:30	Lohkemper 15'	Report	Wanitzek 53'	Stadium: Max-Morlock-Stadion; Attendance: 0 (Note: The match was played behind closed doors due to the COVID-19 pandemic in Germany.); Referee: Harm Osmers; Man of the Match: Fröde

31 October 2020 6	Eintracht Braunschweig	3–2	1. FC Nürnberg	Braunschweig
13:00	Wiebe 21'; Kobylański 52'; Proschwitz 90+3' (pen.)	Report	Köpke 31', 42'	Stadium: Eintracht-Stadion; Attendance: 2,788; Referee: Sven Waschitzki; Man of the Match: Köpke

7 November 2020 7	1. FC Nürnberg	1–1	Fortuna Düsseldorf	Nuremberg
13:00	Schäffler 15' (pen.)	Report	Karaman 30'	Stadium: Max-Morlock-Stadion; Attendance: 0 Referee: Robert Schröder; Man of the Match: Danso

23 November 2020 8	VfL Osnabrück	1–4	1. FC Nürnberg	Osnabrück
20:30	Kerk 90+1' (pen.)	Report	Schäffler 25', 71'; Nürnberger 29'; Lohkemper 43'	Stadium: Stadion an der Bremer Brücke; Attendance: 0 Referee: Felix Zwayer; Man of the Match: Schäffler

29 November 2020 9	1. FC Nürnberg	2–3	SpVgg Greuther Fürth	Nuremberg
13:30	Schäffler 8'; Dovedan 78'	Report	Nielsen 3', 37'; Hrgota 47'	Stadium: Max-Morlock-Stadion; Attendance: 0 Referee: Felix Brych; Man of the Match: Nielsen

6 December 2020 10	SC Paderborn 07	0–2	1. FC Nürnberg	Paderborn
13:30			Hack 8'; Lohkemper 49'	Stadium: Benteler-Arena; Attendance: 0 Referee: Robert Hartmann; Man of the Match: Lohkemper

13 December 2020 11	1. FC Nürnberg	2–1	Würzburger Kickers	Nuremberg
13:30	Schäffler 36'; Sørensen 90+2'	Report	Baumann 56'	Stadium: Max-Morlock-Stadion; Attendance: 0 Referee: Daniel Schlager; Man of the Match: Schäffler

16 December 2020 12	Holstein Kiel	1–0	1. FC Nürnberg	Kiel
18:30	Bartels 80'	Report		Stadium: Holstein-Stadion; Attendance: 0 Referee: Thorben Siewer; Man of the Match: Bartels

20 December 2020 13	1. FC Nürnberg	1–0	FC Erzgebirge Aue	Nuremberg
13:30	Hack 36'	Report		Stadium: Max-Morlock-Stadion; Attendance: 0 Referee: Florian Heft; Man of the Match: Mathenia

2 January 2021 14	1. FC Heidenheim	2–0	1. FC Nürnberg	Heidenheim
13:00	Thomalla 45'; Mainka 76'	Report		Stadium: Voith-Arena; Attendance: 0 Referee: Michael Bacher; Man of the Match: Mainka

9 January 2021 15	1. FC Nürnberg	1–1	Hamburger SV	Nuremberg
13:00	Nürnberger 14'	Report	Terodde 33'	Stadium: Max-Morlock-Stadion; Attendance: 0 Referee: Felix Brych; Man of the Match: Nürnberger

16 January 2021 16	VfL Bochum	3–1	1. FC Nürnberg	Bochum
13:00	Žulj 31'; Tesche 73', 83'	Report	Schäffler 29'	Stadium: Ruhrstadion; Attendance: 0 Referee: Guido Winkmann; Man of the Match: Tesche

24 January 2021 17	1. FC Nürnberg	2–5	Hannover 96	Nuremberg
13:30	Schäffler 35'; Geis 89'	Report	Ducksch 20' (pen.); Hübers 24'; Haraguchi 58'; Muslija 72'; Twumasi 86'	Stadium: Max-Morlock-Stadion; Attendance: 0 Referee: Florian Lechner; Man of the Match: Haraguchi

27 January 2021 18	1. FC Nürnberg	0–1	Jahn Regensburg	Nuremberg
20:30		Report	Albers 88'	Stadium: Max-Morlock-Stadion; Attendance: 0 Referee: Sven Waschitzki; Man of the Match: Albers

31 January 2021 19	SV Sandhausen	2–0	1. FC Nürnberg	Sandhausen
13:30	Röseler 43'; Keita-Ruel 90'	Report		Stadium: Hardtwaldstadion; Attendance: 0 Referee: Matthias Jöllenbeck; Man of the Match: Röseler

6 February 2021 20	SV Darmstadt 98	1–2	1. FC Nürnberg	Darmstadt
13:00	Holland 90' (pen.)	Report	Schleusener 76'; Rapp 90+2' (ogg.)	Stadium: Stadion am Böllenfalltor; Attendance: 0 Referee: Martin Thomsen; Man of the Match: Handwerker

14 February 2021 21	1. FC Nürnberg	1–2	FC St. Pauli	Nuremberg
13:30	Borkowski 77'	Report	Burgstaller 45+1'; Marmoush 65'	Stadium: Max-Morlock-Stadion; Attendance: 0 Referee: Alexander Sather; Man of the Match: Burgstaller

21 February 2021 22	Karlsruher SC	0–1	1. FC Nürnberg	Karlsruhe
13:30		Report	Møller Dæhli 90'	Stadium: Wildparkstadion; Attendance: 0 Referee: Bastian Dankert; Man of the Match: Gersbeck

28 February 2021 23	1. FC Nürnberg	0–0	Eintracht Braunschweig	Nuremberg
13:30		Report		Stadium: Max-Morlock-Stadion; Attendance: 0 Referee: Marco Fritz; Man of the Match: Diakhité

7 March 2021 24	Fortuna Düsseldorf	3–1	1. FC Nürnberg	Düsseldorf
13:30	Hoffmann 48' Sobottka 77' Sorg 90+5' (ogg.)	Report	Borkowski 62'	Stadium: Merkur Spiel-Arena; Attendance: 0 Referee: Martin Petersen; Man of the Match: Sobottka

14 March 2021 25	1. FC Nürnberg	1–1	VfL Osnabrück	Nuremberg
13:30	Schäffler 61'	Report	Heider 73'	Stadium: Max-Morlock-Stadion; Attendance: 0 Referee: Sven Waschitzki; Man of the Match: Kerk

21 March 2021 26	SpVgg Greuther Fürth	2–2	1. FC Nürnberg	Fürth
13:30	Nielsen 8' Abiama 90+3'	Report	Valentini 57' Shuranov 76'	Stadium: Sportpark Ronhof; Attendance: 0 Referee: Felix Zwayer; Man of the Match: Valentini

4 April 2021 27	1. FC Nürnberg	2–1	SC Paderborn 07	Nuremberg
13:30	Schäffler 37' Krauß 75'	Report	Antwi-Adjei 44'	Stadium: Max-Morlock-Stadion; Attendance: 0 Referee: Alexander Sather; Man of the Match: Krauß

11 April 2021 28	Würzburger Kickers	1–1	1. FC Nürnberg	Würzburg
13:30	Dietz 78'	Report	Shuranov 5'	Stadium: Flyeralarm Arena; Attendance: 0 Referee: Tobias Reichel; Man of the Match: Ronstadt

27 April 2021 29	1. FC Nürnberg	1–1	Holstein Kiel	Nuremberg
18:30	Borkowski 31'	Report	Serra 67'	Stadium: Max-Morlock-Stadion; Attendance: 0 Referee: Sören Storks; Man of the Match: Valentini

20 April 2021 30	FC Erzgebirge Aue	0–1	1. FC Nürnberg	Aue
18:30		Report	Hack 85'	Stadium: Erzgebirgsstadion; Attendance: 0 Referee: Manuel Gräfe; Man of the Match: Møller Dæhli

24 April 2021 31	1. FC Nürnberg	3–1	1. FC Heidenheim	Nuremberg
13:00	Geis 2' Nürnberger 26' Krauß 54'	Report	Kleindienst 19' (pen.)	Stadium: Max-Morlock-Stadion; Attendance: 0 Referee: Sascha Stegemann; Man of the Match: Geis

10 May 2021 32	Hamburger SV	5–2	1. FC Nürnberg	Hamburg
20:30	Meißner 30' Jatta 36' Terodde 45+2', 80' (pen.) Kittel 76'	Report	Shuranov 41' Rosenlöcher 89'	Stadium: Volksparkstadion; Attendance: 0 Referee: Felix Zwayer; Man of the Match: Kittel

16 May 2021 33	1. FC Nürnberg	1–1	VfL Bochum	Nuremberg
15:30	Margreitter 38'	Report	Žulj 76'	Stadium: Max-Morlock-Stadion; Attendance: 0 Referee: Markus Schmidt; Man of the Match: Margreitter

23 May 2021 34	Hannover 96	1–2	1. FC Nürnberg	Hannover
15:30	Ducksch 36'	Report	Shuranov 6', 74'	Stadium: Niedersachsenstadion; Attendance: 0 Referee: Thorben Siewer; Man of the Match: Shuranov

=== DFB-Pokal ===
12 September 2020 First round	1. FC Nürnberg	0–3	RB Leipzig	Nuremberg
15:30		Report	Haidara 3'; Poulsen 67'; Hwang 90'	Stadium: Max-Morlock-Stadion; Attendance: 0 Referee: Marco Fritz
