= Linus Rosenlöcher =

German footballer (born 2000)

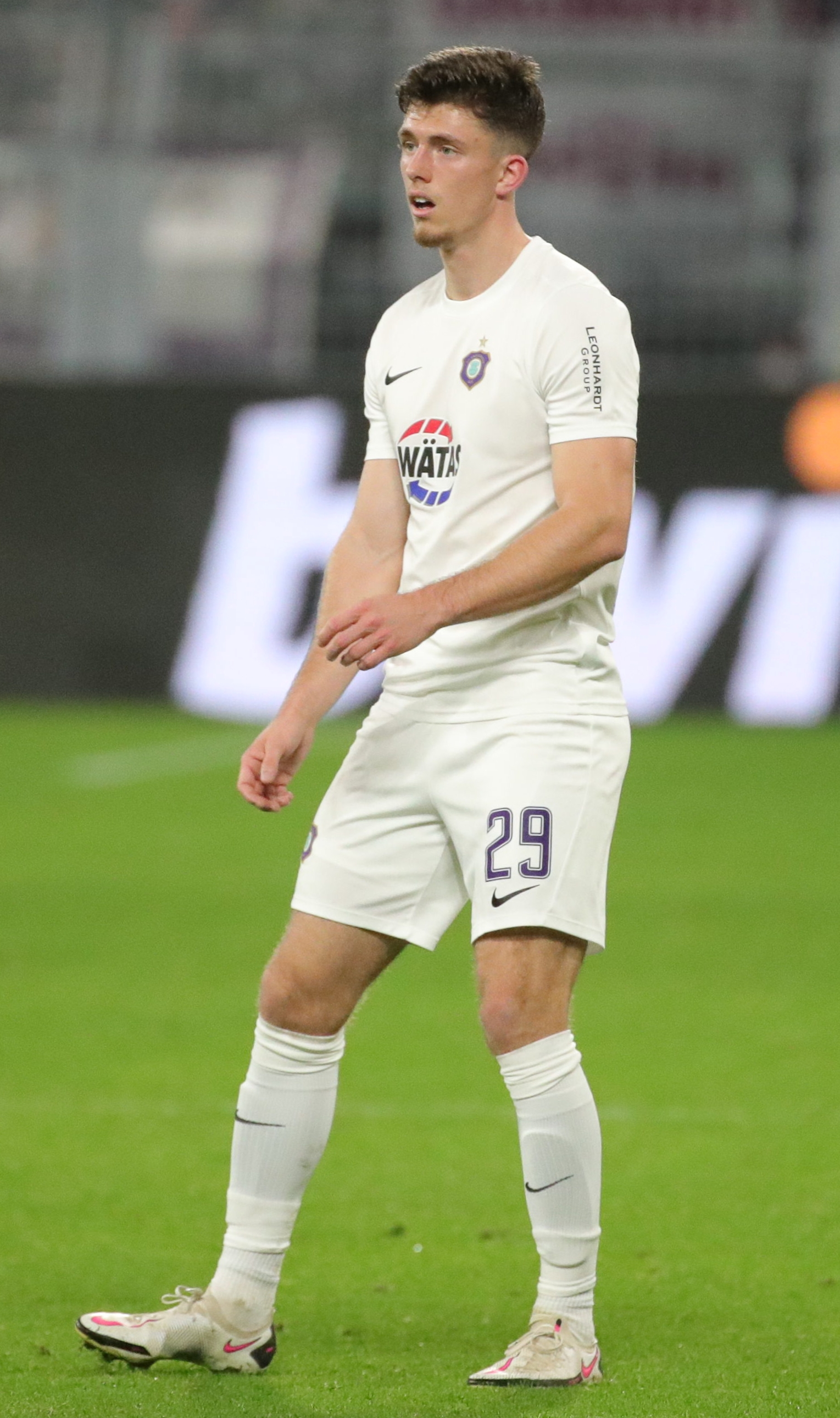
- Rosenlöcher in 2022

Personal information
- Date of birth: 9 September 2000 (age 26)
- Place of birth: Munich, Germany
- Height: 1.82 m (6 ft 0 in)
- Position: Left-back

Team information
- Current team: FC Ingolstadt
- Number: 19

Youth career
- FC Hochzoll
- Tuspo Nürnberg
- –2016: SpVgg Mögeldorf
- 2016–2019: 1. FC Nürnberg

Senior career*
Years	Team	Apps	(Gls)
2018–2021	1. FC Nürnberg II	32	(4)
2020–2022	1. FC Nürnberg	5	(1)
2022	→ Esbjerg fB (loan)	11	(0)
2022–2025	Erzgebirge Aue	77	(0)
2025–	FC Ingolstadt	27	(0)
- * Club domestic league appearances and goals as of 29 May 2026

Linus Rosenlöcher (German pronunciation: [ˈliːnʊs ˈʁoːzn̩ˌlœçɐ]; born 9 September 2000) is a German professional footballer who plays as a left-back for 3. Liga club FC Ingolstadt.

== Career ==
=== 1. FC Nürnberg ===
Rosenlöcher played for FC Hochzoll, Tuspo Nürnberg and SpVgg Mögeldorf in his youth career, before joining the youth academy of 1. FC Nürnberg in 2016. He made his professional debut for Nürnberg's senior team in the 2. Bundesliga on 27 January 2021, coming on as a substitute in the 74th minute for Tim Latteier against Jahn Regensburg. The home match finished as a 1–0 loss for Nürnberg.

==== Loan to Esbjerg fB ====
On 11 January 2022, Rosenlöcher joined Danish 1st Division club Esbjerg fB on a loan-deal for the rest of the season, with a buying option. He made his debut on 25 February in Esbjerg's 4–2 defeat to Fremad Amager.

=== Erzgebirge Aue ===
On 4 June 2022, Rosenlöcher signed a two-year contract with Erzgebirge Aue.

=== Ingolstadt ===
On 6 June 2025, Rosenlöcher moved to FC Ingolstadt.

== Career statistics ==
As of match played on 4 July 2024

Appearances and goals by club, season and competition
Club	Season	League			National cup		Other		Total	
Club	Season	Division	Apps	Goals	Apps	Goals	Apps	Goals	Apps	Goals
1. FC Nürnberg II	2018–19	Regionalliga Bayern	1	0	—		—		1	0
1. FC Nürnberg II	2019–20	Regionalliga Bayern	17	3	—		2	0	17	3
1. FC Nürnberg II	2021–22	Regionalliga Bayern	14	1	—		—		14	1
1. FC Nürnberg II	Total		32	4	0	0	2	0	34	4
1. FC Nürnberg	2020–21	2. Bundesliga	5	1	0	0	—		5	1
1. FC Nürnberg	2021–22	2. Bundesliga	0	0	0	0	—		0	0
1. FC Nürnberg	Total		5	1	0	0	0	0	5	1
Esbjerg fB (loan)	2021–22	Danish 1st Division	11	0	0	0	—		11	0
Erzgebirge Aue	2022–23	3. Liga	29	0	1	0	—		30	0
Erzgebirge Aue	2023–24	3. Liga	18	0	0	0	—		18	0
Erzgebirge Aue	Total		47	0	1	0	0	0	48	0
Career total			95	5	1	0	2	0	98	5
