= Nicolas Kühn =

German footballer (born 2000)

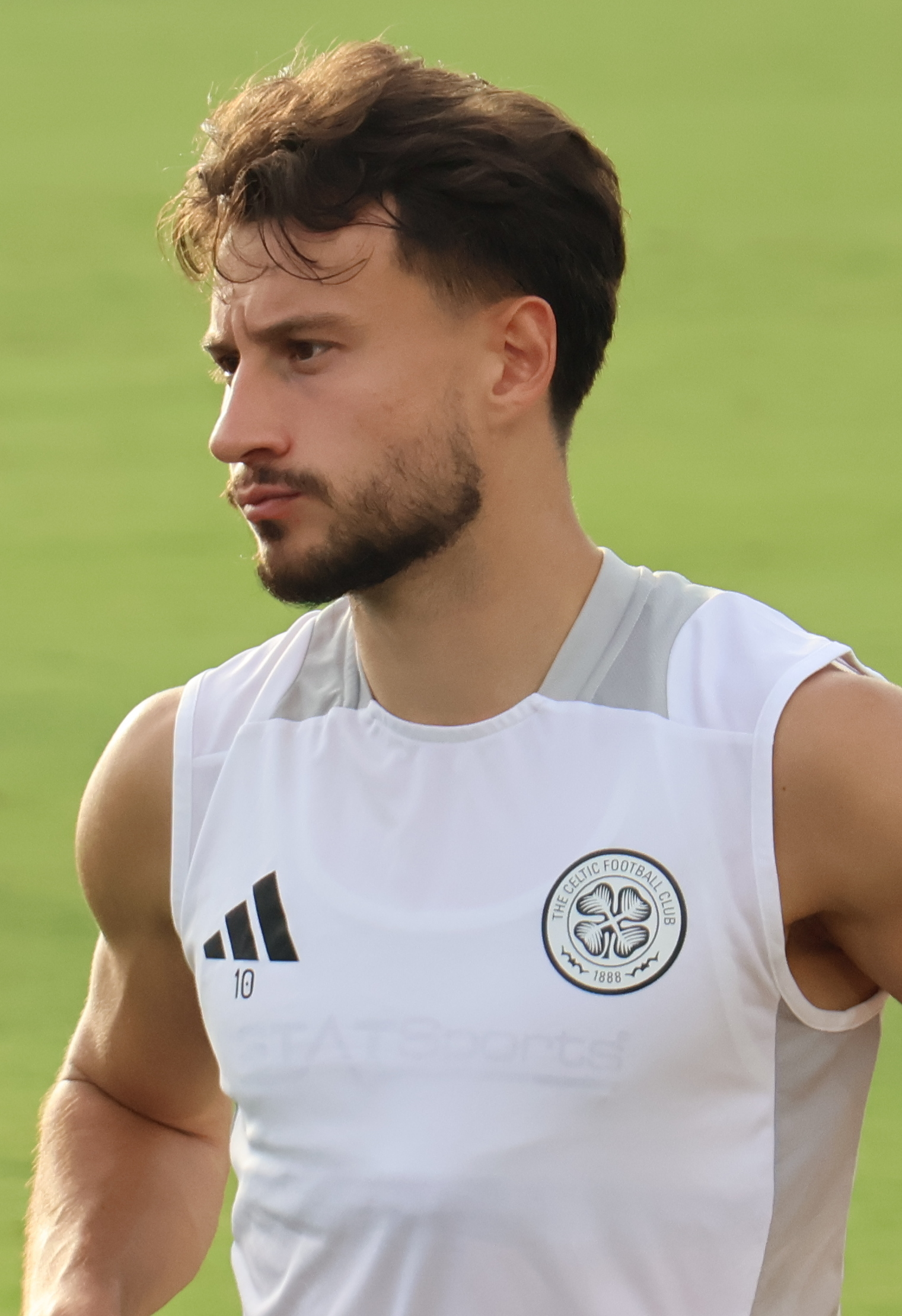
- Kühn training with Celtic in 2024

Personal information
- Full name: Nicolas-Gerrit Kühn
- Date of birth: 1 January 2000 (age 26)
- Place of birth: Wunstorf, Germany
- Height: 1.75 m (5 ft 9 in)
- Positions: Winger; forward

Team information
- Current team: Borussia Mönchengladbach (on loan from Como)
- Number: 19

Youth career
- TSV Klein Heidorn
- 1. FC Wunstorf
- 2009–2011: FC St. Pauli
- 2011–2015: Hannover 96
- 2015–2018: RB Leipzig

Senior career*
Years	Team	Apps	(Gls)
2018–2020	Jong Ajax	43	(5)
2020	Ajax	0	(0)
2020	→ Bayern Munich II (loan)	16	(2)
2020–2022	Bayern Munich II	21	(4)
2021–2022	→ Erzgebirge Aue (loan)	27	(3)
2022–2024	Rapid Wien	36	(5)
2024–2025	Celtic	46	(15)
2025–	Como	23	(1)
2026–	→ Borussia Mönchengladbach (loan)	2	(0)

International career^{‡}
2015	Germany U15	2	(1)
2015–2016	Germany U16	5	(4)
2016–2017	Germany U17	12	(9)
2018	Germany U18	2	(2)
2018–2019	Germany U19	7	(1)
2019	Germany U20	4	(2)
- * Club domestic league appearances and goals as of 17:28, 31 October 2026 (UTC) ‡ National team caps and goals as of 15:42, 1 July 2020 (UTC)

Nicolas-Gerrit Kühn (born 1 January 2000) is a German professional footballer who plays as a winger or forward for Bundesliga club Borussia Mönchengladbach, on loan from Serie A club Como.

== Club career ==
=== Early years ===
Born in Wunstorf, Hanover Region, Kühn began playing football at TSV Klein Heidorn and 1. FC Wunstorf, before joining the youth academy of FC St. Pauli, where he played for two years. In 2011, Kühn moved to Hannover 96, where he joined the U13 team. In the 2014–15 season, at the age of 15, he had already made two appearances for their U17 team in the Under 17 Bundesliga. For the 2015–16 season, Kühn moved to the U17 team of RB Leipzig, for whom he scored 18 goals in 22 appearances in the Under 17 Bundesliga. In the 2016–17 season, the striker scored 6 goals in 13 matches in the Under 17 Bundesliga, but fell out with a high ankle sprain. Upon his return for the second half of the season, he was already a part of the team competing in the Under 19 Bundesliga. In the 2017–18 season he was permanently moved up to the U19-team, for whom he also competed in the UEFA Youth League, and regularly trained with the first team.

=== Ajax ===
Kühn signed for Dutch club Ajax from RB Leipzig in January 2018 for a fee of €2 million.

=== Bayern Munich ===
In January 2020, Kühn moved on loan to Bayern Munich for six months. The move was made permanent on 14 July 2020, when Kühn signed a three-year contract and was placed in the reserve team Bayern Munich II.

==== Loan to Erzgebirge Aue ====
In June 2021, Kühn moved on loan for the 2021–22 season to Erzgebirge Aue, with an option to purchase, however the team was relegated and did not activate the option.

=== Rapid Wien ===
In May 2022, Kühn left Bayern Munich and joined Austrian Bundesliga club Rapid Wien for a €500,000 reported fee.

=== Celtic ===
On 16 January 2024, Kühn signed a five-and-a-half-year contract with Scottish Premiership club Celtic, for a fee reported to be around £3 million. On 27 January 2024, Kühn made his debut coming on as a sub against Ross County. On 3 February 2024, Kühn scored his first goal for Celtic in a 1–1 draw against Aberdeen.

On 5 November 2024 in the UEFA Champions League as part of a 3–1 Celtic win, Kühn scored two goals against RB Leipzig, with whom he had played at youth team level. Following the match, he was described by the BBC as "one of the most important players in the Celtic team".

After scoring his 15th and 16th goals of the season against St Mirren on 4 January 2025, Kuhn's form saw a dip, only scoring twice in his next 19 games, one of which was the opener in Celtic's 1–1 Champions League draw Bayern Munich at the Allianz Arena on 18 February. He scored twice as Celtic secured a fourth consecutive league title on 26 April by beating Dundee United 5–0 at Tannadice Park.

=== Como ===
In July 2025, Celtic manager Brendan Rodgers confirmed that Kühn would be transferring to Italian Serie A club Como. The transfer completed on 11 July.

==== Loan to Borussia Mönchengladbach ====
On 1 September 2026, he returned to his native Germany and joined Bundesliga club Borussia Mönchengladbach, on loan for the 2026–27 season.

== International career ==
Kühn has played at every youth age group for Germany from under-15 to under-20.

== Style of play ==
Kühn was described by the Bundesliga website as "a player who loves nothing more than to have the ball at his feet and dribble at his opponents, Kühn resembles a Coman type of player. With a high level of confidence, Kühn is not afraid to take risks by seeking one-on-ones and taking on his opponents, using his pace and excellent close control to deadly effect. Kühn is also a rather rare commodity in being left-footed, but he is equally at home on the left or the right, or even behind the strikers as a support man."

== Career statistics ==
As of match played 31 October 2026

Appearances and goals by club, season and competition
Club	Season	League			National cup (Note: Includes Austrian Cup, Scottish Cup, Coppa Italia)		League cup (Note: Includes Scottish League Cup)		Europe		Total	
Club	Season	Division	Apps	Goals	Apps	Goals	Apps	Goals	Apps	Goals	Apps	Goals
Jong Ajax	2017–18	Eerste Divisie	5	0	–		–		–		5	0
Jong Ajax	2018–19	Eerste Divisie	21	2	–		–		–		21	2
Jong Ajax	2019–20	Eerste Divisie	17	3	–		–		–		17	3
Jong Ajax	Total		43	5	–		–		–		43	5
Bayern Munich II (loan)	2019–20	3. Liga	16	2	—		—		—		16	2
Bayern Munich II	2020–21	3. Liga	21	4	—		—		—		21	4
Erzgebirge Aue (loan)	2021–22	2. Bundesliga	27	3	0	0	–		–		27	3
Rapid Vienna	2022–23	Austrian Bundesliga	20	3	3	0	–		6 (Note: Appearances in UEFA Europa Conference League)	1	29	4
Rapid Vienna	2023–24	Austrian Bundesliga	16	2	3	1	–		3	0	22	3
Rapid Vienna	Total		36	5	6	1	–		9	1	51	7
Celtic	2023–24	Scottish Premiership	14	2	4	1	–		–		18	3
Celtic	2024–25	Scottish Premiership	32	13	6	1	3	4	10 (Note: Appearances in UEFA Champions League)	3	51	21
Celtic	Total		46	15	10	2	3	4	10	3	69	24
Como	2025–26	Serie A	23	1	2	0	–		–		25	1
Borussia Mönchengladbach (loan)	2026–27	Bundesliga	2	0	0	0	–		–		2	0
Career total			214	35	18	3	3	4	19	4	254	46

== Honours ==
Jong Ajax

- Eerste Divisie: 2017–18

Bayern Munich II

- 3. Liga: 2019–20

Celtic

- Scottish Premiership: 2023–24, 2024–25
- Scottish Cup: 2023–24
- Scottish League Cup: 2024–25

Individual

- Fritz Walter Medal U19 Gold Medal: 2019
