= Dmitry Nazarov (footballer) =

Azerbaijani footballer (born 1990)

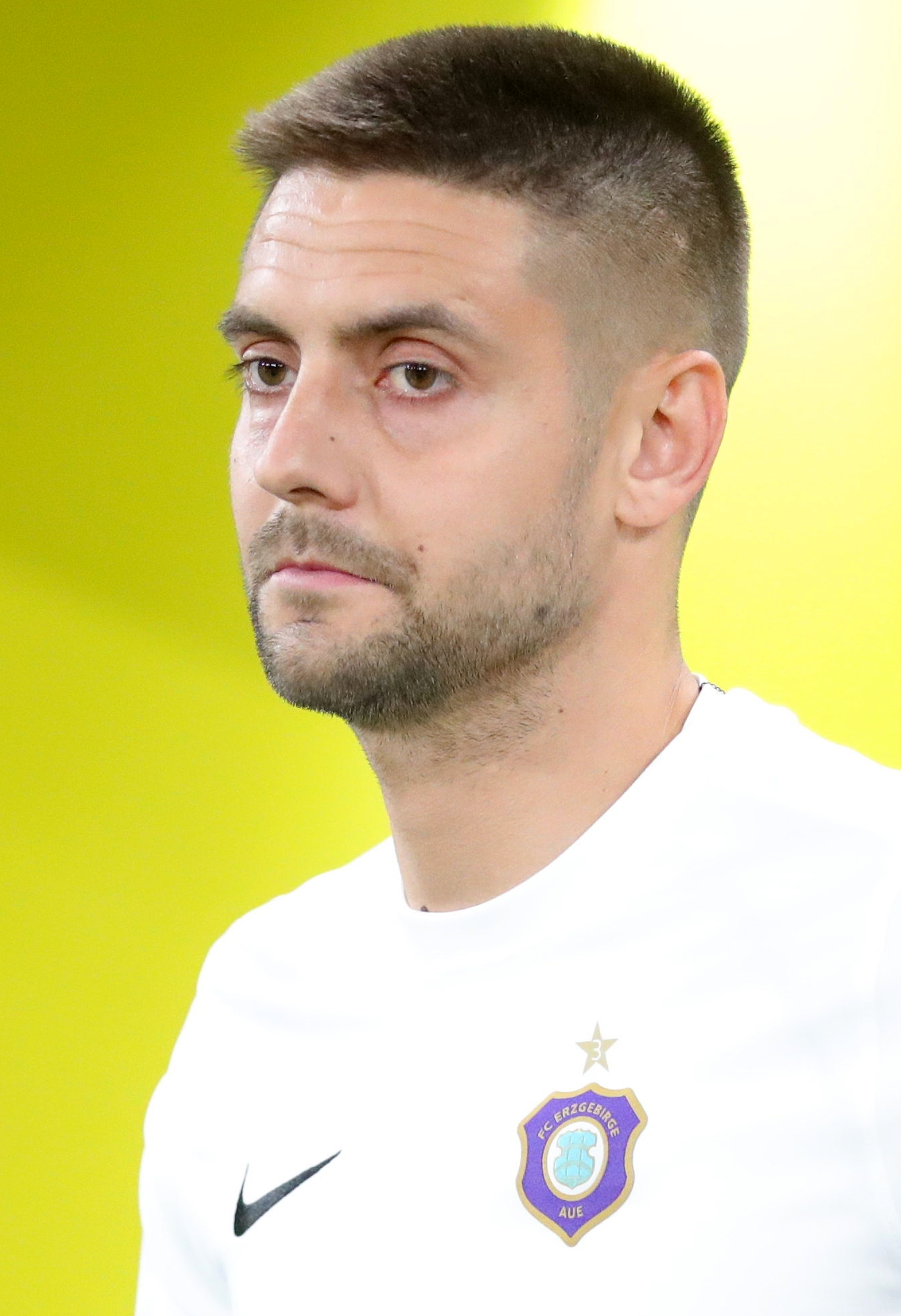
- Nazarov in 2022

Personal information
- Full name: Dmitry Valentinovich Nazarov
- Date of birth: 4 April 1990 (age 36)
- Place of birth: Krasnoarmeysk, Kazakh SSR
- Height: 1.85 m (6 ft 1 in)
- Position: Striker

Team information
- Current team: Kickers Offenbach
- Number: 10

Youth career
- 2001–2006: Wormatia Worms
- 2006–2009: 1. FC Kaiserslautern

Senior career*
Years	Team	Apps	(Gls)
2009–2010	1. FC Kaiserslautern II	22	(2)
2010–2012	Eintracht Frankfurt II	39	(11)
2012–2013	Preußen Münster	36	(6)
2013–2016	Karlsruher SC	77	(10)
2016–2023	Erzgebirge Aue	205	(45)
2023–	Kickers Offenbach	50	(15)

International career^{‡}
2014–	Azerbaijan	46	(7)
- * Club domestic league appearances and goals as of 1 January 2025 ‡ National team caps and goals as of 1 April 2024

Dmitry Valentinovich Nazarov (Azerbaijani: Dmitri Valentin oğlu Nazarov; Russian: Дмитрий Валентинович Назаров; born 4 April 1990) is a professional footballer who plays for German Regionalliga club Kickers Offenbach and the Azerbaijan national team.

== Early life ==
Dmitry Valentinovich Nazarov was born on 4 April 1990 in Taiynsha, then Kazakh SSR, one of the republics of the Soviet Union. His grandfather was ethnic Azerbaijani. His family moved to Germany when he was one year old.

== Club career ==
On 7 June 2013, Nazarov signed a three-year contract with 2. Bundesliga side Karlsruher SC. On 2 July 2016, he signed a two-year contract with 2. Bundesliga side FC Erzgebirge Aue.

On 22 June 2023, Nazarov signed with Kickers Offenbach in Regionalliga Südwest.

== International career ==
Because Nazarov was born in Kazakhstan, he was eligible to play for the national teams of Kazakhstan and all other former Soviet Union republics. In October 2012, he was spotted by then Azerbaijan's German head coach Berti Vogts and nominated for a match against Russia on 16 October. However, he was not able to make his debut because the Azerbaijani Football Federation failed to organize the issue of his Azerbaijani passport. He finally debuted on 27 May 2014 in an away match against the United States in San Francisco.

== Career statistics ==
=== Club ===
As of match played 11 November 2022

Appearances and goals by club, season and competition
Club	Season	League			DFB-Pokal		Other		Total	
Club	Season	Division	Apps	Goals	Apps	Goals	Apps	Goals	Apps	Goals
Kaiserslautern II	2009–10	Regionalliga West	22	2	—		—		22	2
Eintracht Frankfurt II	2010–11	Regionalliga Süd	10	2	—		—		10	2
Eintracht Frankfurt II	2011–12	Regionalliga Süd	29	9	—		—		29	9
Eintracht Frankfurt II	Total		39	11	—		0	0	39	11
Preußen Münster	2012–13	3. Liga	36	6	2	1	—		38	7
Karlsruher SC	2013–14	2. Bundesliga	26	6	1	0	—		27	6
Karlsruher SC	2014–15	2. Bundesliga	25	2	2	0	2 (Note: Appearances in the 2. Bundesliga promotion play-offs)	0	29	2
Karlsruher SC	2015–16	2. Bundesliga	26	2	1	0	—		27	2
Karlsruher SC	Total		77	10	4	0	2	0	83	10
Erzgebirge Aue	2016–17	2. Bundesliga	28	9	1	0	—		29	9
Erzgebirge Aue	2017–18	2. Bundesliga	30	3	1	0	2	0	33	3
Erzgebirge Aue	2018–19	2. Bundesliga	24	4	1	0	—		25	4
Erzgebirge Aue	2019–20	2. Bundesliga	32	10	2	0	—		34	10
Erzgebirge Aue	2020–21	2. Bundesliga	30	8	1	0	—		31	8
Erzgebirge Aue	2021–22	2. Bundesliga	30	4	1	0	—		31	4
Erzgebirge Aue	2022–23	3. Liga	14	1	1	0	—		15	1
Erzgebirge Aue	Total		188	39	8	0	2	0	198	39
Career total			362	68	14	1	4	0	380	69

=== International ===
As of match played 16 November 2019

Appearances and goals by national team and year
National team	Year	Apps	Goals
Azerbaijan	2014	7	1
Azerbaijan	2015	7	3
Azerbaijan	2016	8	1
Azerbaijan	2017	5	1
Azerbaijan	2018	10	1
Azerbaijan	2019	6	0
Total		43	7

As of 17 November 2018
Scores and results list Azerbaijan's goal tally first, score column indicates score after each Nazarov goal.

List of international goals scored by Dmitry Nazarov
No.	Date	Venue	Cap	Opponent	Score	Result	Competition
1	9 September 2014	Bakcell Arena, Baku, Azerbaijan	4	Bulgaria	1–1	1–2	UEFA Euro 2016 qualification
2	28 March 2015	Tofiq Bahramov Stadium, Baku, Azerbaijan	8	Malta	2–0	2–0	UEFA Euro 2016 qualification
3	7 June 2015	NV Arena, Sankt Pölten, Austria	9	Serbia	1–1	1–4	Friendly
4	10 October 2015	Tofiq Bahramov Stadium, Baku, Azerbaijan	13	Italy	1–1	1–3	UEFA Euro 2016 qualification
5	3 June 2016	Stadion Rohrbach, Rohrbach an der Lafnitz, Austria	18	Canada	1–1	1–1	Friendly
6	26 March 2017	Tofiq Bahramov Stadium, Baku, Azerbaijan	23	Germany	1–1	1–4	2018 FIFA World Cup qualification
7	11 October 2018	Tórsvøllur, Tórshavn, Faroe Islands	34	Faroe Islands	2–0	3–0	2018–19 UEFA Nations League D

Note: Some sources have credited Nazarov with scoring the first goal in a 2–0 victory over Faroe Islands in 2018, however this was an own-goal scored by Sonni Nattestad.
