= Sam Schreck =

German footballer (born 1999)

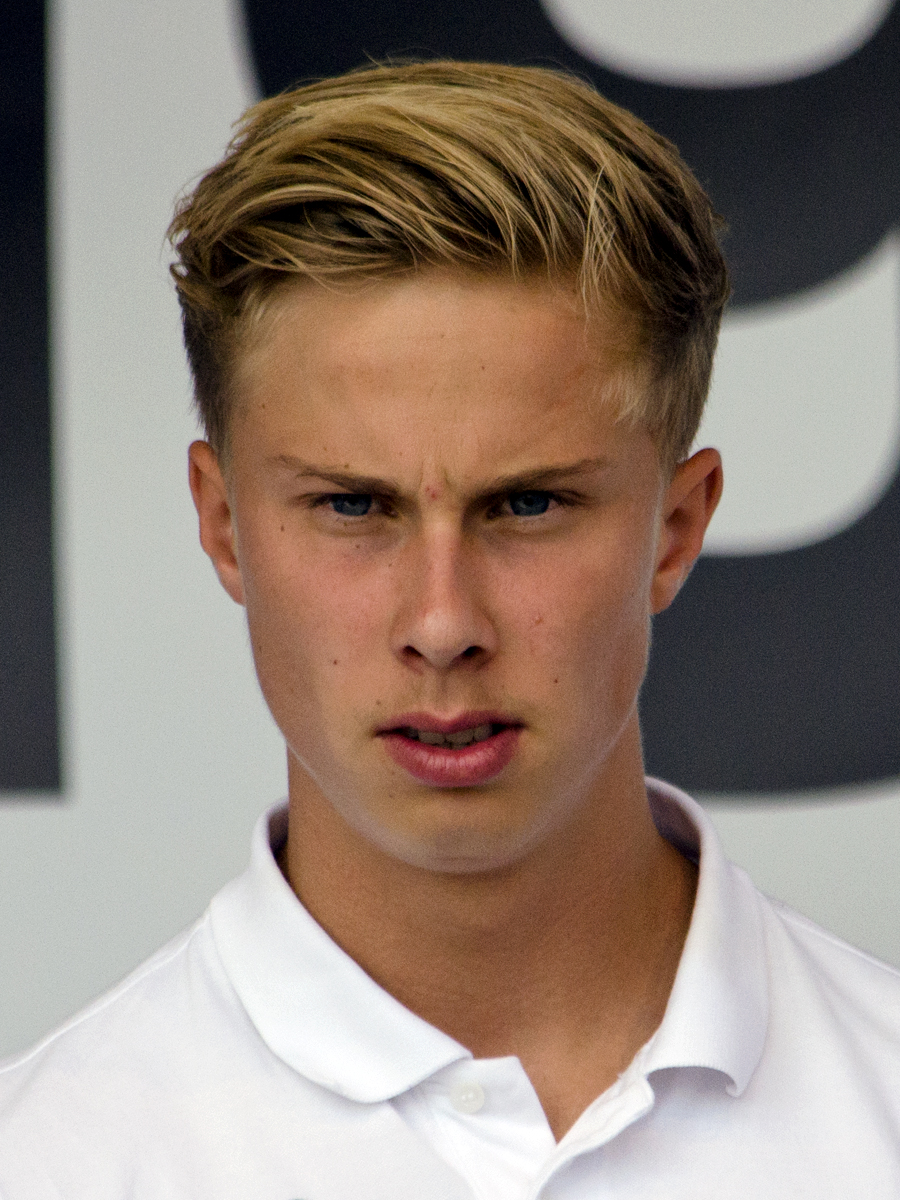
- Schreck in 2018

Personal information
- Full name: Sam Francis Schreck
- Date of birth: 29 January 1999 (age 27)
- Place of birth: Pinneberg, Germany
- Height: 1.80 m (5 ft 11 in)
- Position: Midfielder

Team information
- Current team: Arminia Bielefeld
- Number: 8

Youth career
- –2006: TuS Appen
- 2006–2010: Hamburger SV
- 2010–2011: TuS Appen
- 2011–2013: Kummerfelder SV
- 2013–2016: FC St. Pauli
- 2016–2018: Bayer Leverkusen

Senior career*
| Years | Team | Apps | (Gls) |
| 2018–2019 | Bayer Leverkusen | 0 | (0) |
| 2019–2022 | FC Groningen | 26 | (0) |
| 2021–2022 | → Erzgebirge Aue (loan) | 26 | (0) |
| 2022–2023 | Erzgebirge Aue | 28 | (3) |
| 2023– | Arminia Bielefeld | 69 | (2) |

International career^{‡}
| 2014–2015 | Germany U16 | 10 | (1) |
| 2015–2016 | Germany U17 | 13 | (2) |
| 2017 | Germany U18 | 3 | (2) |
| 2017–2018 | Germany U19 | 6 | (1) |
| 2018 | Germany U20 | 2 | (0) |
- * Club domestic league appearances and goals as of 18 May 2026 ‡ National team caps and goals as of 18:02, 29 November 2018 (UTC)

Sam Francis Schreck (born 29 January 1999) is a German professional footballer who plays as a midfielder for 2. Bundesliga club Arminia Bielefeld.

== Club career ==
Schreck made his professional debut for Bayer Leverkusen in the UEFA Europa League on 29 November 2018, starting against Bulgarian club Ludogorets Razgrad before coming off in the 73rd minute for Kai Havertz. The home match finished as a 1–1 draw.

On 6 August 2022, Schreck returned to Erzgebirge Aue on a permanent basis after playing for the club on loan in the previous season and signed a one-year contract with an option to extend. In June 2023, Schreck signed for Arminia Bielefeld.

== International career ==
Schreck began his youth international career with Germany's under-16 team, first appearing on 12 September 2014 against Belgium. He was included in Germany's squad for the 2016 UEFA European Under-17 Championship in Azerbaijan. The team managed to reach the semi-finals, before losing 2–1 against Spain.

== Career statistics ==
=== Club ===
As of match played on 1 April 2023

Appearances and goals by club, season and competition
| Club | Season | League | | | National Cup | | Continental | | Total | |
| Club | Season | Division | Apps | Goals | Apps | Goals | Apps | Goals | Apps | Goals |
|---|---|---|---|---|---|---|---|---|---|---|
| Bayer Leverkusen | 2018–19 | Bundesliga | 0 | 0 | 0 | 0 | 2 (Note: Appearance in UEFA Europa League) | 0 | 2 | 0 |
| Groningen | 2019–20 | Eredivisie | 13 | 0 | 0 | 0 | – | | 2 | 0 |
| Groningen | 2020–21 | Eredivisie | 13 | 0 | 1 | 0 | – | | 14 | 0 |
| Groningen | 2021–22 | Eredivisie | 0 | 0 | 0 | 0 | – | | 0 | 0 |
| Groningen | Total | | 26 | 0 | 1 | 0 | 0 | 0 | 27 | 0 |
| Erzgebirge Aue (loan) | 2021–22 | 2. Bundesliga | 26 | 0 | 1 | 0 | — | | 27 | 0 |
| Erzebirge Aue | 2022–23 | 3. Liga | 23 | 3 | 0 | 0 | 1 (Note: Appearance in the Saxony Cup) | 0 | 24 | 3 |
| Career total | | | 75 | 3 | 2 | 0 | 3 | 0 | 80 | 3 |

== Honours ==
Arminia Bielefeld

- 3. Liga: 2024–25
- DFB-Pokal runner-up: 2024–25
- Westphalian Cup: 2024–25
