= Joshua Schwirten =

German footballer (born 2002)

Personal information
- Date of birth: 7 January 2002 (age 24)
- Place of birth: Bergisch Gladbach, Germany
- Height: 1.82 m (6 ft 0 in)
- Position: Attacking midfielder

Youth career
- –2009: TuS Immekeppel
- 2009–2021: 1. FC Köln

Senior career*
Years	Team	Apps	(Gls)
2021–2023	1. FC Köln II	57	(13)
2023–2024	Erzgebirge Aue	27	(2)
2024–2026	Roda JC	39	(3)

International career
2021–2022	Germany U20	2	(0)
- * Club domestic league appearances and goals as of 3 February 2026

Joshua Schwirten (born 7 January 2002) is a German professional footballer who plays as a forward.

== Club career ==
Schwirten started playing football for TuS Immekeppel before joining the youth academy of 1. FC Köln in the 2009–10 season. He advanced through the club's youth system and was part of the under-17 team that won the Under 17 Bundesliga in July 2019.

Ahead of the 2020–21 season, Schwirten moved up from the under-19 to the under-21 team, making his Regionalliga West debut on 3 April 2021, in a 2–1 victory over SV Bergisch Gladbach 09. In his second match, a 5–2 win against VfB Homberg, he scored his first Regionalliga West goal. During the 2021–22 season, he made 22 appearances for 1. FC Köln II, tallying seven goals and four assists. In February 2021, he extended his contract with the club until 30 June 2023. In the 2022–23 season, he featured in 29 matches, contributing to eleven goals.

For the 2023–24 season, Schwirten joined Erzgebirge Aue in the 3. Liga. He debuted on matchday three in a home match against SV Sandhausen, scoring the decisive goal in a 2–1 win. The following year, he joined Dutch second-division Eerste Divisie side Roda JC.

== Career statistics ==
As of match played 21 February 2025

Appearances and goals by club, season and competition
Club	Season	League			Cup		Other		Total	
Club	Season	Division	Apps	Goals	Apps	Goals	Apps	Goals	Apps	Goals
1. FC Köln II	2020–21	Regionalliga West	6	1	—		—		6	1
1. FC Köln II	2021–22	Regionalliga West	22	7	—		—		22	7
1. FC Köln II	2022–23	Regionalliga West	29	5	—		—		29	5
1. FC Köln II	Total		57	13	—		—		57	13
Erzgebirge Aue	2023–24	3. Liga	27	2	0	0	—		27	2
Roda JC	2024–25	Eerste Divisie	19	0	1	0	—		20	0
Career total			103	15	1	0	0	0	104	15
