= Tim Latteier =

German footballer

Personal information
- Date of birth: 20 May 2000 (age 26)
- Place of birth: Kitzingen, Germany
- Height: 1.76 m (5 ft 9 in)
- Position: Midfielder

Team information
- Current team: SGV Heilbronn-Freiberg
- Number: 22

Youth career
- –2011: TSV 1860 Scheinfeld
- 2011–2019: 1. FC Nürnberg

Senior career*
Years	Team	Apps	(Gls)
2019–2022	1. FC Nürnberg II	52	(11)
2020–2022	1. FC Nürnberg	9	(0)
2022–2024	SpVgg Bayreuth	49	(4)
2024–2025	FSV Frankfurt	31	(4)
2025–2026	1. FC Schweinfurt 05	25	(0)
2026–	SGV Heilbronn-Freiberg	2	(0)
- * Club domestic league appearances and goals as of 24 September 2026

Tim Latteier (born 20 May 2000) is a German footballer who plays as a midfielder for SGV Heilbronn-Freiberg.

== Career ==
Latteier made his professional debut for 1. FC Nürnberg in the 2. Bundesliga on 24 January 2021, coming on as a substitute in the 69th minute for Enrico Valentini against Hannover 96. The home match finished as a 5–2 loss for Nürnberg.

For the 2022–23 season, Latteier moved to SpVgg Bayreuth. On 21 August 2023, he extended his contracht with SpVgg Bayreuth for another year.
