= Soufiane Messeguem =

German footballer (born 2001)

Personal information
- Full name: Soufiane Messegeuem
- Date of birth: 5 February 2001 (age 25)
- Place of birth: Coburg, Germany
- Height: 1.80 m (5 ft 11 in)
- Position: Midfielder

Team information
- Current team: Académico de Viseu
- Number: 14

Youth career
- Magdeburger SV Börde 1949
- –2016: 1. FC Magdeburg
- 2016–2020: VfL Wolfsburg

Senior career*
Years	Team	Apps	(Gls)
2020–2021	VfL Wolfsburg II	7	(0)
2021–2022	Erzgebirge Aue	21	(0)
2022–	Académico de Viseu	119	(3)

International career^{‡}
2018–2019	Germany U18	4	(0)
2019	Germany U19	6	(0)
2020	Germany U20	6	(0)
- * Club domestic league appearances and goals as of 19 June 2026 ‡ National team caps and goals as of 20:52, 25 November 2021 (UTC)

Soufiane Messeguem (born 5 February 2001) is a German professional footballer who plays as a midfielder for Primeira Liga club Académico de Viseu.

== Club career ==
Messeguem was born in Coburg, Bavaria, and played youth football for Magdeburger SV Börde 1949, 1. FC Magdeburg and VfL Wolfsburg. Messeguem made his senior debut for VfL Wolfsburg II on 18 September 2020 in a 3–2 win over HSC Hannover in the Regionalliga Nord. In summer 2021, Messeguem signed for 2. Bundesliga side Erzgebirge Aue on a three-year contract, he made his debut as a substitute in a 0–0 draw with 1. FC Nürnberg on 25 July 2021.

On 22 July 2022, Messeguem signed a four-year contract with Académico de Viseu in Portugal.

== International career ==
Messeguem has represesented Germany at under-18, under-19 and under-20 levels.
