= Lenn Jastremski =

German footballer (born 2001)

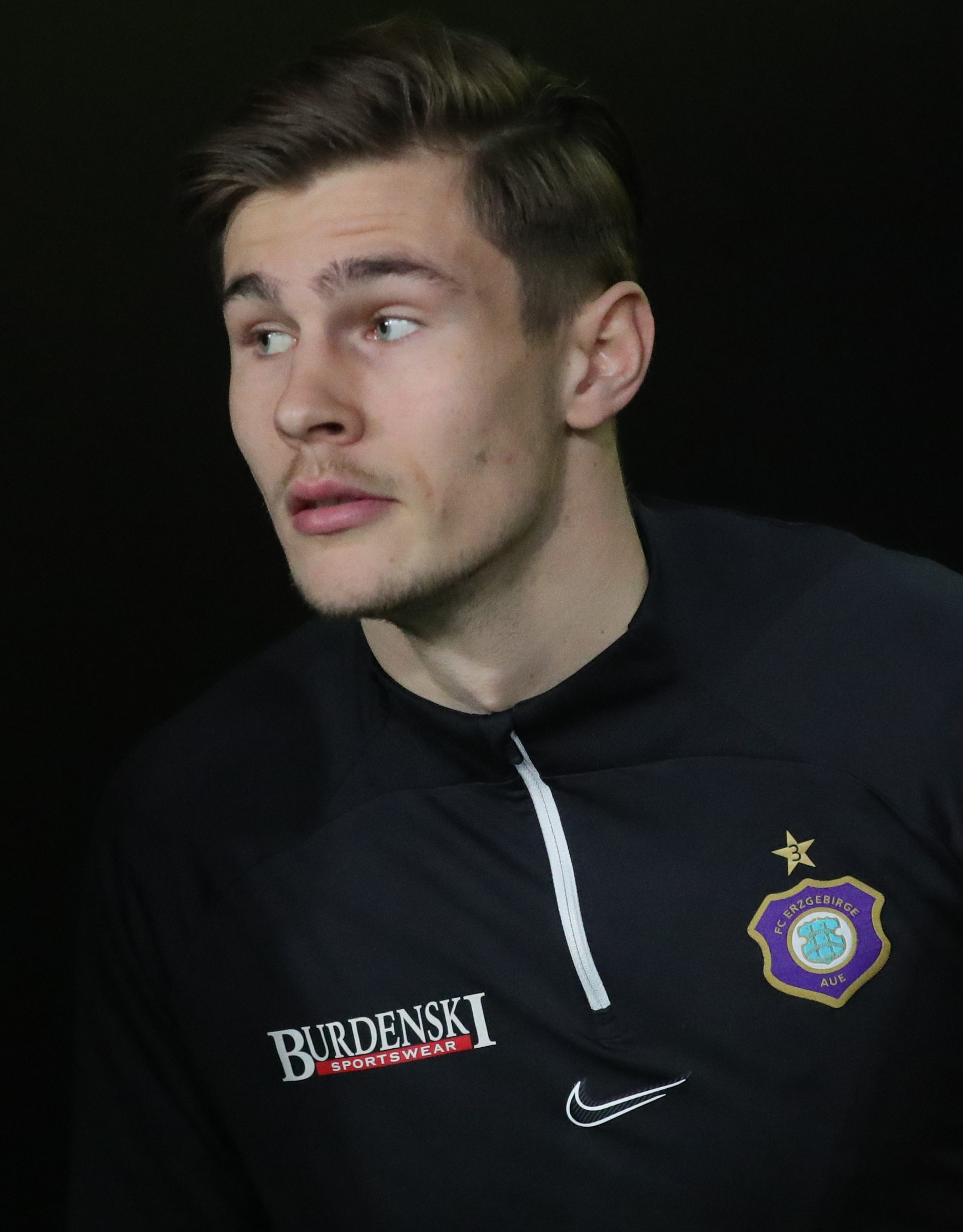
- Jastremski in 2022

Personal information
- Date of birth: 24 January 2001 (age 25)
- Place of birth: Salzgitter, Germany
- Height: 1.90 m (6 ft 3 in)
- Position: Centre-forward

Team information
- Current team: Austria Lustenau
- Number: 9

Youth career
- –2009: FC Pfeil Broistedt
- 2009–2020: VfL Wolfsburg

Senior career*
Years	Team	Apps	(Gls)
2020	VfL Wolfsburg II	1	(0)
2020–2024	Bayern Munich II	32	(4)
2021–2022	→ Viktoria Köln (loan)	11	(2)
2022–2023	→ Erzgebirge Aue (loan)	15	(1)
2023	→ Grazer AK (loan)	14	(5)
2023	→ SSV Ulm (loan)	1	(0)
2024	→ Grazer AK (loan)	15	(5)
2024–2025	SpVgg Unterhaching	33	(7)
2025–	Austria Lustenau	31	(3)

International career^{‡}
2018–2019	Germany U18	4	(0)
2019	Germany U19	8	(3)
2020	Germany U20	3	(0)
- * Club domestic league appearances and goals as of 15 August 2026 ‡ National team caps and goals as of 21 October 2023

Lenn Jastremski (born 24 January 2001) is a German professional footballer who plays as a centre-forward for Austrian Bundesliga club Austria Lustenau.

== Career statistics ==
As of 17 May 2026

Appearances and goals by club, season and competition
Club	Season	League			National Cup (Note: Includes DFB-Pokal)		League Cup		Total	
Club	Season	Division	Apps	Goals	Apps	Goals	Apps	Goals	Apps	Goals
VfL Wolfsburg II	2019–20	Regionalliga Nord	1	0	—		—		1	0
Bayern Munich II	2020–21	3. Liga	28	4	—		—		28	4
Bayern Munich II	2021–22	Regionalliga Bayern	4	0	—		—		4	0
Bayern Munich II	Total		32	4	—		—		32	4
Viktoria Köln (loan)	2021–22	3. Liga	11	2	—		1 (Note: Appearance in Middle Rhine Cup)	1	12	3
Erzgebirge Aue (loan)	2022–23	3. Liga	15	1	1	0	2 (Note: Appearance in Saxony Cup)	1	18	2
Grazer AK (loan)	2022–23	2. Liga	14	5	—		—		14	5
SSV Ulm (loan)	2023–24	3. Liga	1	0	—		2 (Note: Appearance in Württemberg Cup)	1	3	1
Grazer AK (loan)	2023–24	2. Liga	15	5	—		—		15	5
SpVgg Unterhaching	2024–25	3. Liga	31	7	—		1 (Note: Appearance in Bavarian Cup)	0	33	7
SC Austria Lustenau	2025–26	2. Liga	28	2	—		2	1	30	3
Career total			148	26	3	1	6	3	157	30
