= Elias Huth =

German footballer (born 1997)

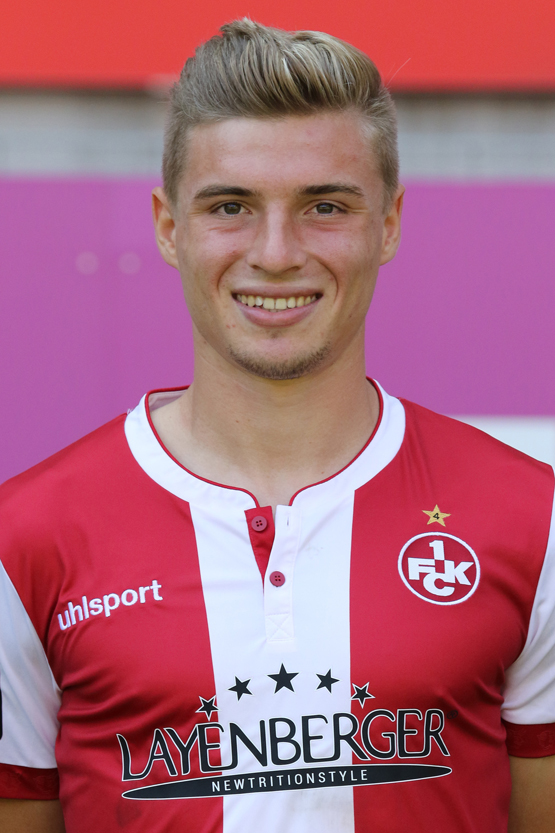
- Huth with 1. FC Kaiserslautern in 2018

Personal information
- Full name: Elias Paul Huth
- Date of birth: 10 February 1997 (age 29)
- Place of birth: Karlstein-Großwelzheim, Germany
- Height: 1.85 m (6 ft 1 in)
- Position: Forward

Team information
- Current team: Sportfreunde Siegen
- Number: 29

Youth career
- Germania Großwelzheim
- Kickers Offenbach
- Bayern Alzenau
- Eintracht Frankfurt
- –2015: FSV Frankfurt
- 2015–2016: Hannover 96

Senior career*
Years	Team	Apps	(Gls)
2016–2018	Hannover 96 II	32	(11)
2016–2018	Hannover 96	1	(0)
2017–2018	→ Rot-Weiß Erfurt (loan)	36	(7)
2018–2022	1. FC Kaiserslautern	67	(5)
2019–2020	→ FSV Zwickau (loan)	31	(14)
2022	→ Hallescher FC (loan)	18	(10)
2022–2023	Erzgebirge Aue	29	(0)
2023–2025	Jahn Regensburg	54	(8)
2025–2026	Vitesse	37	(5)
2026–	Sportfreunde Siegen	6	(1)
- * Club domestic league appearances and goals as of 19:36, 16 September 2026 (UTC)

Elias Paul Huth (born 10 February 1997) is a German professional footballer who plays as a forward for Regionalliga West club Sportfreunde Siegen.

== Career ==
In June 2017, Huth joined 3. Liga club Rot-Weiß Erfurt on a season-long loan.

On 21 January 2022, Huth moved to Hallescher FC.
