= Enrico Valentini =

German footballer

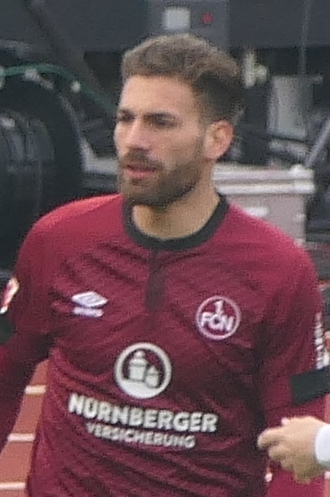
- Valentini with 1. FC Nürnberg in 2019

Personal information
- Date of birth: 20 February 1989 (age 37)
- Place of birth: Nuremberg, West Germany
- Height: 1.82 m (6 ft 0 in)
- Position: Right back

Team information
- Current team: 1. FC Nürnberg (U14 coach)

Youth career
- 1994–2008: 1. FC Nürnberg

Senior career*
Years	Team	Apps	(Gls)
2008–2010	1. FC Nürnberg II	57	(8)
2010–2014	VfR Aalen	97	(9)
2014–2017	Karlsruher SC	80	(2)
2017–2025	1. FC Nürnberg	167	(5)

Managerial career
- 2025–: 1. FC Nürnberg (U-14)
- * Club domestic league appearances and goals

Enrico Valentini (born 20 February 1989) is a German professional football coach and a former player. He is the head coach of the Under-14 team of 1. FC Nürnberg.

== Career ==
Valentini was released by 1. FC Nürnberg II on 29 May 2010 and signed for VfR Aalen.

On 9 February 2014, he signed a three-year contract with Karlsruher SC to join them in July.

== Personal life ==
Born in Germany, Valentini is of Italian descent.

== Career statistics ==
As of match played on 25 January 2021.

Appearances and goals by club, season and competition
Club	Season	League			Cup		Other		Total		Ref.
Club	Season	Division	Apps	Goals	Apps	Goals	Apps	Goals	Apps	Goals	Ref.
1. FC Nürnberg II	2008–09	Regionalliga Süd	26	1	—		—		26	1	
1. FC Nürnberg II	2009–10	Regionalliga Süd	31	7	—		—		31	7	
1. FC Nürnberg II	Total		57	8	—		—		57	8	—
VfR Aalen	2010–11	3. Liga	19	0	—		—		19	0	
VfR Aalen	2011–12	3. Liga	27	0	—		—		27	0	
VfR Aalen	2012–13	2. Bundesliga	28	4	2	1	—		30	5	
VfR Aalen	2013–14	2. Bundesliga	23	5	1	0	—		24	5	
VfR Aalen	Total		97	9	3	1	—		100	10	—
Karlsruher SC	2014–15	2. Bundesliga	31	0	2	0	2 (Note: Appearances in the Bundesliga promotion playoff.)	0	35	0	
Karlsruher SC	2015–16	2. Bundesliga	26	2	0	0	—		26	2	
Karlsruher SC	2016–17	2. Bundesliga	23	0	1	0	—		24	0	
Karlsruher SC	Total		80	2	3	0	2	0	85	2	—
1. FC Nürnberg	2017–18	2. Bundesliga	33	0	3	1	—		36	1	
1. FC Nürnberg	2018–19	Bundesliga	15	0	2	0	—		17	0	
1. FC Nürnberg	2019–20	2. Bundesliga	19	0	2	0	—		21	0	
1. FC Nürnberg	2020–21	2. Bundesliga	15	0	1	0	—		16	0	
1. FC Nürnberg	Total		82	0	8	1	—		91	1	—
Career total			316	19	14	2	2	0	332	21	—
