= Nico Gorzel =

German footballer (born 1998)

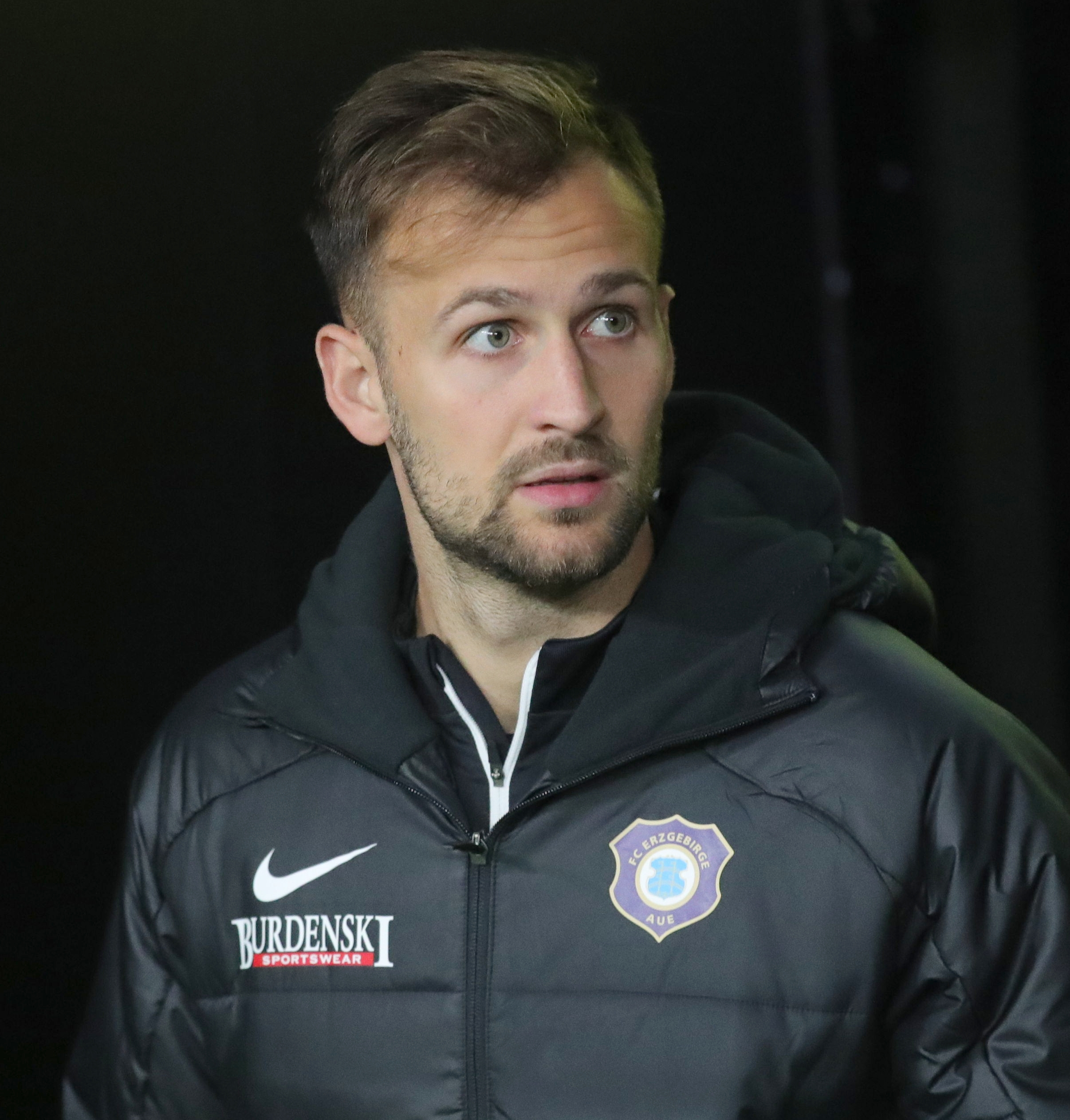
- Gorzel in 2022

Personal information
- Date of birth: 29 July 1998 (age 28)
- Place of birth: Freilassing, Germany
- Height: 1.75 m (5 ft 9 in)
- Position: Defensive midfielder

Youth career
- 2002–2016: Red Bull Salzburg

Senior career*
Years	Team	Apps	(Gls)
2016–2018	FC Liefering	51	(0)
2018–2019	Wiener Neustadt	28	(1)
2019–2020	SKN St. Pölten	9	(0)
2020–2022	Türkgücü München	46	(1)
2022–2023	Erzgebirge Aue	22	(0)
2024–2026	Austria Lustenau	54	(4)
- * Club domestic league appearances and goals as of 17 May 2026

Nico Gorzel (born 29 July 1998) is a German professional footballer who plays as a defensive midfielder.

== Career ==
On 17 September 2019, Gorzel joined Austrian Bundesliga club SKN St. Pölten on a free transfer, signing a contract until the summer 2021.

Gorzel joined 3. Liga club Erzgebirge Aue on 19 June 2022, after his former club Türkgücü München had been relegated after filing for insolvency.

On 24 January 2024, Gorzel signed a 1.5-year contract with Austria Lustenau.
