= Omar Sijarić =

Montenegrin footballer (born 2001)

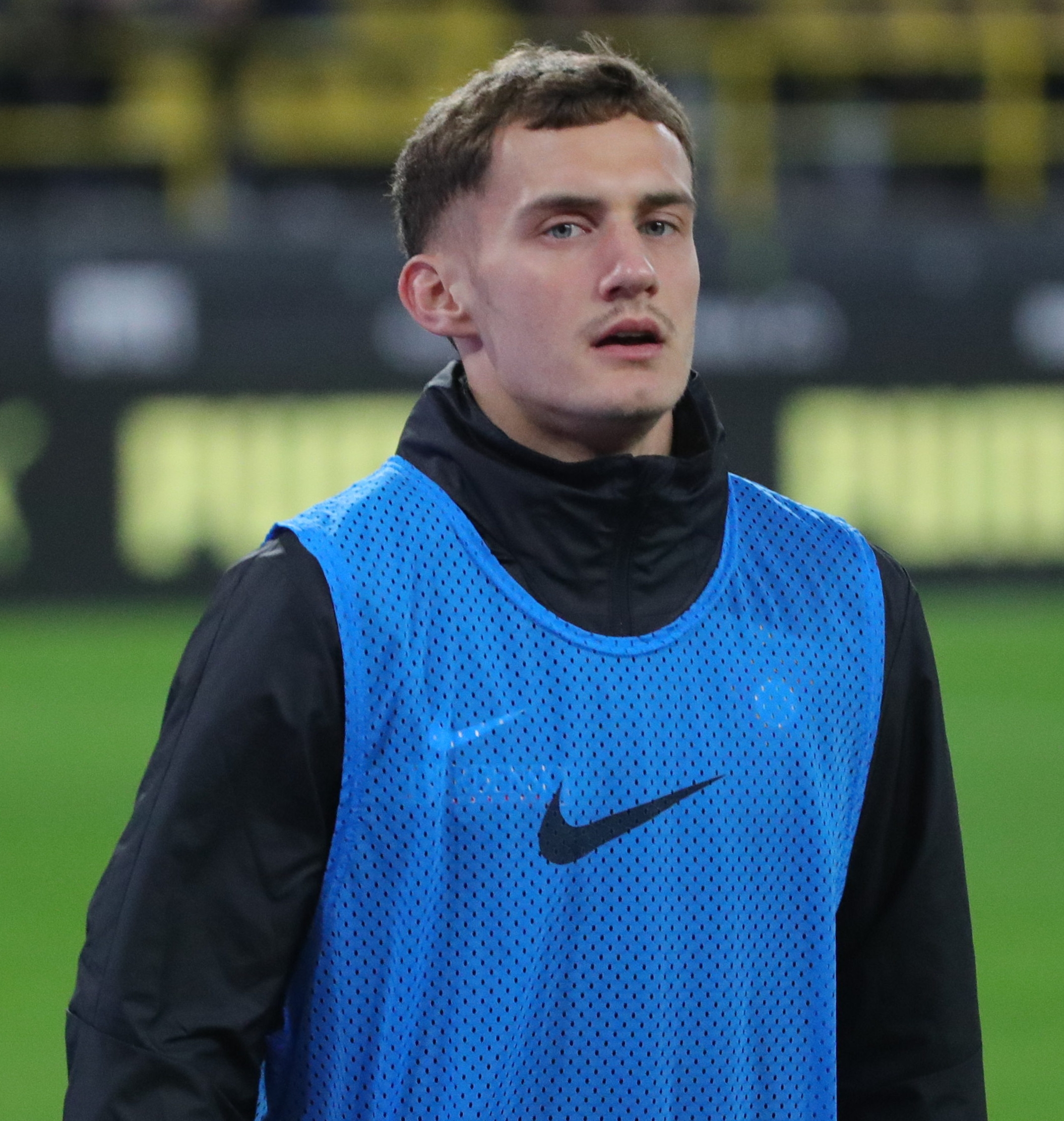
- Sijarić in 2022

Personal information
- Full name: Omar-Šarif Sijarić
- Date of birth: 2 November 2001 (age 24)
- Place of birth: Pfullendorf, Germany
- Height: 1.79 m (5 ft 10 in)
- Position: Right winger

Team information
- Current team: Borac Banja Luka
- Number: 17

Youth career
- –2017: SC Pfullendorf
- 2017–2020: 1. FC Heidenheim

Senior career*
Years	Team	Apps	(Gls)
2020–2021	Türkgücü München	27	(1)
2021–2025	Erzgebirge Aue	103	(10)
2025	Rijeka	0	(0)
2026–	Borac Banja Luka	7	(0)

International career
2019	Montenegro U19	4	(0)
2021	Montenegro U21	2	(0)
- * Club domestic league appearances and goals as of 11 June 2026

Omar-Šarif Sijarić (born 2 November 2001) is a professional footballer who plays as a right winger for Bosnian Premier League club Borac Banja Luka. Born in Germany, he represented Montenegro internationally on junior levels.

== Club career ==
Sijarić was born in Pfullendorf. After playing youth football with SC Pfullendorf and 1. FC Heidenheim, Sijarić joined Türkgücü München in August 2020. He made his debut for the club on 16 October 2020 as a substitute in a 2–0 defeat away to 1. FC Magdeburg, and scored the first goal of his career on 7 May 2021 with the opening goal of a 2–1 defeat to SC Verl. He scored once in 27 appearances across the 2020–21 season.

On 15 July 2021, Sijarić signed for 2. Bundesliga club Erzgebirge Aue on a three-year contract. He made his debut on 25 July 2021 in a 0–0 draw with 1. FC Nürnberg.

On 3 June 2025, Sijarić joined Rijeka in Croatia on a three-year contract.

== International career ==
He has played for Montenegro at under-19 and under-21 levels.

== Career statistics ==
As of match played 10 April 2026

Appearances and goals by club, season and competition
Club	Season	League			National cup (Note: Includes DFB-Pokal, Saxony Cup, Croatian Cup)		Total	
Club	Season	Division	Apps	Goals	Apps	Goals	Apps	Goals
Türkgücü München	2020–21	3. Liga	27	1	—		27	1
Erzgebirge Aue	2021–22	2. Bundesliga	16	1	1	0	17	1
Erzgebirge Aue	2022–23	3. Liga	25	3	2	0	27	3
Erzgebirge Aue	2023–24	3. Liga	27	0	—		27	0
Erzgebirge Aue	2024–25	3. Liga	35	6	6	1	41	7
Erzgebirge Aue	Total		103	10	9	1	112	11
Rijeka	2025–26	Croatian Football League	0	0	1	0	1	0
Borac Banja Luka	2025–26	Bosnian Premier League	7	0	—		7	0
Borac Banja Luka	2026–27	Bosnian Premier League	0	0	0	0	0	0
Borac Banja Luka	Total		7	0	0	0	7	0
Career total			137	11	10	1	147	12
