= Korbinian Burger =

German footballer (born 1995)

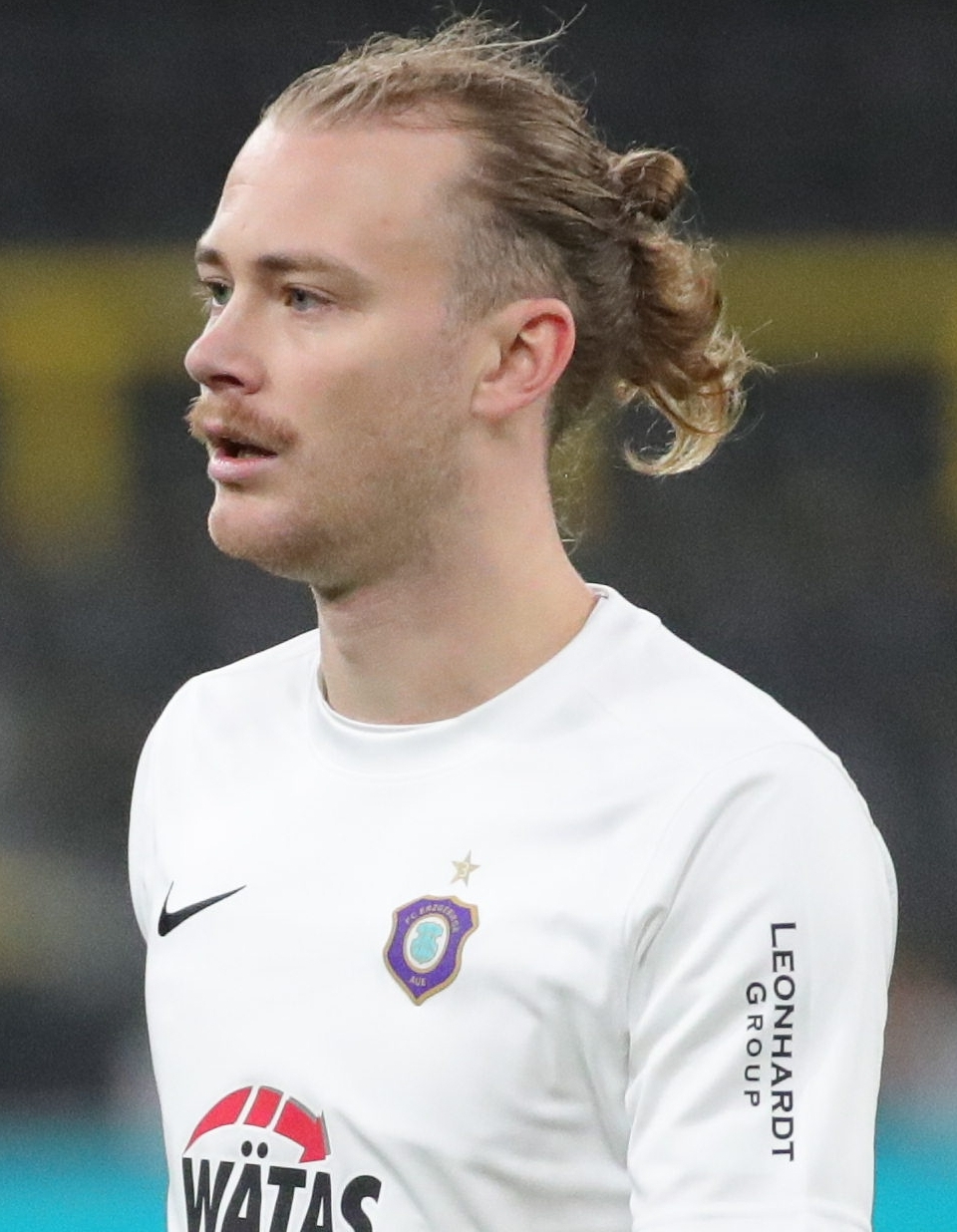
- Burger with Erzgebirge Aue in 2022

Personal information
- Date of birth: 27 April 1995 (age 31)
- Place of birth: Cham, Germany
- Height: 1.89 m (6 ft 2 in)
- Position: Centre-back

Team information
- Current team: Mainz 05 II
- Number: 5

Youth career
- FC Chammünster
- –2010: ASV Cham
- 2010–2014: 1860 Munich

Senior career*
Years	Team	Apps	(Gls)
2014–2015	1860 Munich II	17	(0)
2015–2017	Bayern Munich II	28	(0)
2017–2018	Greuther Fürth II	23	(2)
2017–2018	Greuther Fürth	0	(0)
2018–2020	Sonnenhof Großaspach	50	(0)
2020–2022	1. FC Magdeburg	41	(1)
2022–2024	Erzgebirge Aue	43	(1)
2024–	Mainz 05 II	59	(3)
- * Club domestic league appearances and goals as of 24 September 2026

Korbinian Burger (born 27 April 1995) is a German professional footballer who plays as a centre-back for Mainz 05 II. His sister is pop singer Leony.

== Career ==
On 15 June 2022, Burger joined Erzgebirge Aue on a two-year contract.

On 29 June 2024, Burger moved to Mainz 05 II in the Regionalliga.
