= Erik Majetschak =

German footballer (born 2000)

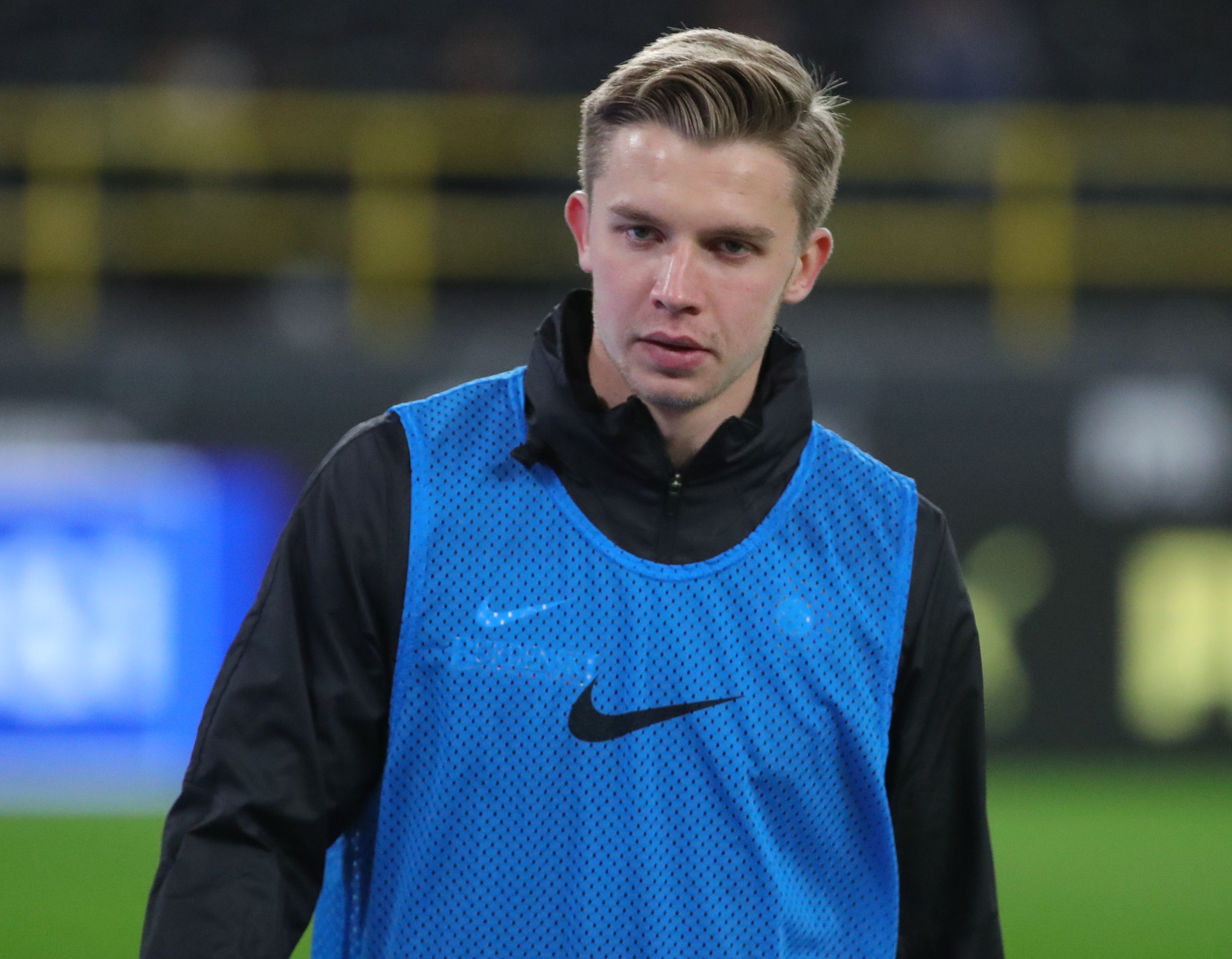
- Majetschak in 2022

Personal information
- Full name: Erik Majetschak
- Date of birth: 1 March 2000 (age 26)
- Place of birth: Bad Lausick, Germany
- Height: 1.80 m (5 ft 11 in)
- Position: Midfielder

Team information
- Current team: Jahn Regensburg
- Number: 13

Youth career
- 2011–2019: RB Leipzig

Senior career*
Years	Team	Apps	(Gls)
2018–2019	RB Leipzig	0	(0)
2019–2026	Erzgebirge Aue	131	(7)
2026–	Jahn Regensburg	7	(0)

International career
2015	Germany U15	2	(0)
2015–2016	Germany U16	9	(3)
2016–2017	Germany U17	16	(2)
2018	Germany U18	2	(1)
- * Club domestic league appearances and goals as of 14:37, 26 September 2026 (UTC)

Erik Majetschak (born 1 March 2000) is a German professional footballer who plays as a midfielder for 3. Liga club Jahn Regensburg.

== Club career ==
Majetschak made his professional debut for RB Leipzig on 2 August 2018, coming on as a substitute in the 64th minute for Emil Forsberg in the UEFA Europa League qualifying match against Swedish club BK Häcken of the Allsvenskan, which finished as a 1–1 away draw.

On 20 June 2019, Majetschak joined Erzgebirge Aue on a three-year contract.

After Aue's relegation to the Regionalliga, Majetschak moved to Jahn Regensburg and signed a two-year contract.
