= Antonio Jonjić =

German footballer (born 1999)

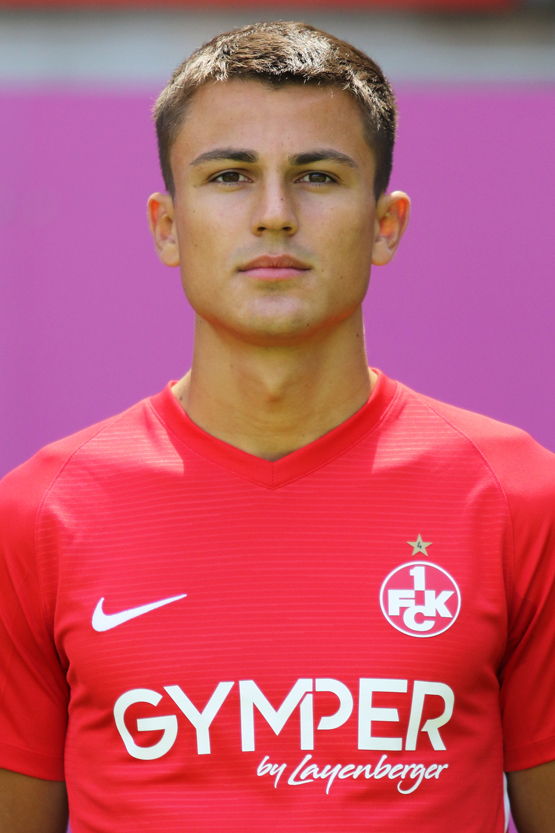
- Jonjić with 1. FC Kaiserslautern in 2019

Personal information
- Date of birth: 2 August 1999 (age 27)
- Place of birth: Ludwigshafen, Germany
- Height: 1.83 m (6 ft 0 in)
- Position: Midfielder

Team information
- Current team: TB Jahn Zeiskam
- Number: 10

Youth career
- Waldhof Mannheim
- –2013: 1899 Hoffenheim
- 2013–2018: 1. FC Kaiserslautern

Senior career*
Years	Team	Apps	(Gls)
2018–	1. FC Kaiserslautern II	24	(2)
2018–2020	1. FC Kaiserslautern	17	(0)
2020–2023	Erzgebirge Aue	52	(11)
2023–2024	Wehen Wiesbaden	11	(0)
2024–2025	Hansa Rostock	17	(0)
2025–	TB Jahn Zeiskam	0	(0)
- * Club domestic league appearances and goals as of 3 September 2025

Antonio Jonjić (born 2 August 1999) is a German professional footballer who plays as a midfielder for sixth-tier Verbandsliga Südwest club TB Jahn Zeiskam.

== Career ==
Jonjić made his professional debut for 1. FC Kaiserslautern in the 3. Liga on 26 January 2019, coming on as a substitute in the 83rd minute for Christoph Hemlein in the 2–0 home win against Sonnenhof Großaspach.

Jonjić moved to FC Erzgebirge Aue on 5 October 2020, the last day of the 2020 summer transfer window. He signed a three-year contract.

On 9 May 2023, Jonjić moved to SV Wehen Wiesbaden, from the upcoming season on a free transfer.

On 28 August 2024, Jonjić signed with Hansa Rostock.
