= Marco Schikora =

German footballer

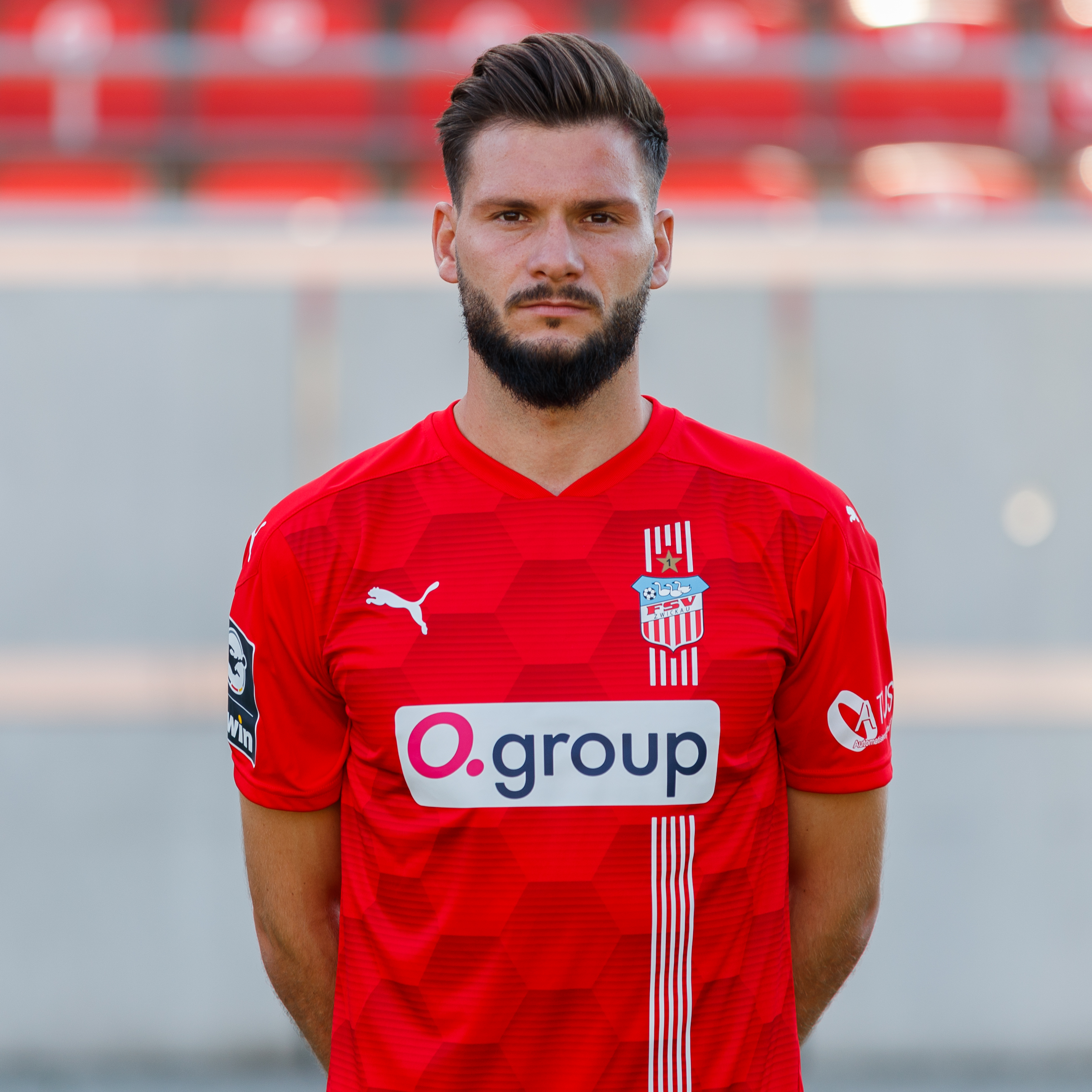
- Schikora with FSV Zwickau in July 2021

Personal information
- Date of birth: 20 September 1994 (age 32)
- Place of birth: Stadthagen, Germany
- Height: 1.82 m (6 ft 0 in)
- Position: Full-back

Team information
- Current team: SBV Vitesse
- Number: 6

Youth career
- –2012: TSV Havelse
- 2012–2014: Germania Egestorf/Langreder

Senior career*
Years	Team	Apps	(Gls)
2014–2018	Germania Egestorf/Langreder	97	(11)
2018–2019	Viktoria Berlin	32	(3)
2019–2020	Kickers Offenbach	19	(3)
2020–2022	FSV Zwickau	64	(9)
2022–2024	Erzgebirge Aue	72	(6)
2024–2025	SV Sandhausen	34	(2)
2025–	SBV Vitesse	36	(6)
- * Club domestic league appearances and goals as of 28 April 2026

Marco Schikora (born 20 September 1994) is a German footballer who plays as a full-back for Eerste Divisie side SBV Vitesse.

== Career ==
Born in Stadthagen, Schikora played youth football with TSV Havelse before joining Germania Egestorf/Langreder in 2012. After six years at Germania Egestorf/Langreder, he joined Viktoria Berlin in the summer of 2018, and made 32 league appearances, scoring 3 goals, before joining Kickers Offenbach on a one-year contract the following summer. He appeared 19 times in the league for Kickers Offenbach across the 2019–20 season, in which he scored 3 goals before joining 3. Liga side FSV Zwickau in August 2020.

In June 2022, Schikora signed for 3. Liga club Erzgebirge Aue on a two-year deal after leaving Zwickau.

On 6 June 2024, Schikora moved to SV Sandhausen in 3. Liga.

On 11 September 2025, Schikora joined SBV Vitesse on a one-year contract, following a trial period with the club.
