= Paul-Philipp Besong =

German footballer

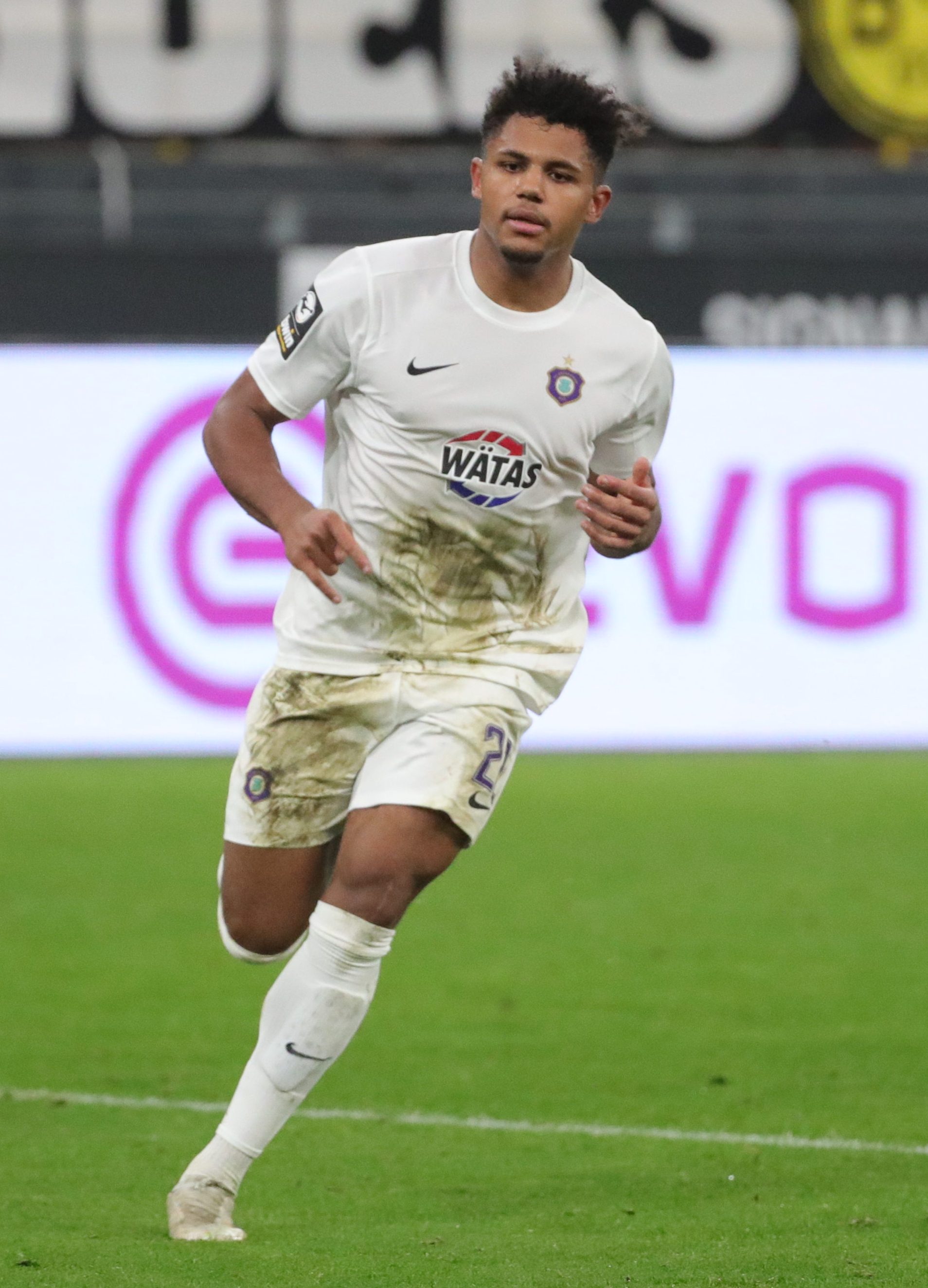
- Besong in 2022

Personal information
- Date of birth: 6 October 2000 (age 26)
- Place of birth: Fröndenberg, Germany
- Height: 1.84 m (6 ft 0 in)
- Position: Forward

Team information
- Current team: FSV Zwickau
- Number: 17

Youth career
- 2008–2009: SV Bausenhagen
- 2009–2019: Borussia Dortmund

Senior career*
Years	Team	Apps	(Gls)
2019–2023	FC Nürnberg II	19	(8)
2022–2023	→ Erzgebirge Aue (loan)	31	(5)
2023–2025	Borussia Dortmund II	26	(7)
2025–2026	SSV Ulm	18	(1)
2026	→ Sportfreunde Siegen (loan)	10	(1)
2026–	FSV Zwickau	11	(1)
- * Club domestic league appearances and goals as of 8 October 2026

Paul-Philipp Besong (born 6 October 2000) is a German professional footballer who plays as a forward for Regionalliga Nordost club FSV Zwickau.

== Career ==
Besong is a youth product of SV Bausenhagen, before moving to the youth academy of Borussia Dortmund in 2009 where he spent most of his development. On 26 June 2019, he transferred to 1. FC Nürnberg, where he was initially assigned to their reserves. He was unable to play for Nürnberg's senior team as he was set back by a cruciate ligament tear in the summer of 2020, and a meniscus injury in the summer of 2021. He was loaned to Erzgebirge Aue in the 3. Liga for the 2022–23 season. After his loan, he was then sold to Borussia Dortmund II on 16 June 2023 on a two-year contract.

On 26 July 2025, Besong joined 3. Liga club SSV Ulm on a two-year deal.

On June 30, 2026, Besong signed a two-year contract with the Regionalliga club FSV Zwickau.

== Personal life ==
Born in Germany, Besong was born to a Cameroonian father and German mother.
