= Anthony Barylla =

German footballer (born 1997)

Personal information
- Date of birth: 1 June 1997 (age 29)
- Place of birth: Gera, Germany
- Height: 1.80 m (5 ft 11 in)
- Position: Right-back

Team information
- Current team: VSG Altglienicke
- Number: 16

Youth career
- –2010: SV Schmölln 1913
- 2010–2016: RB Leipzig

Senior career*
Years	Team	Apps	(Gls)
2016–2017	RB Leipzig II	24	(2)
2017–2019	FSV Zwickau	62	(2)
2019–2021	1. FC Saarbrücken	55	(3)
2021–2026	Erzgebirge Aue	120	(3)
2026–	VSG Altglienicke	5	(0)
- * Club domestic league appearances and goals as of 23 September 2026

Anthony Barylla (born 1 June 1997) is a German professional footballer who plays as a right-back for VSG Altglienicke.

== Career ==
=== RB Leipzig ===
Barylla is a product of the RB Leipzig youth academy.

=== FSV Zwickau ===
In July 2017, Barylla moved to FSV Zwickau. He made his competitive debut for the club on 23 July 2017 in a 1–0 away defeat to Chemnitzer FC. He was subbed on for Morris Schröter in the 84th minute. He scored his first competitive goal for the club on 31 March 2018 in a 2–1 away defeat to Carl Zeiss Jena. His goal, assisted by Fabian Schnabel, came in the 81st minute.

=== 1. FC Saarbrücken ===
1. FC Saarbrücken announced on 2 June 2019, that they had signed Barylla.

== Personal life ==
Anthony's father, André, was a professional footballer who played for Zwickau. Barylla's uncle, Dirk Pfitzner, was also a professional footballer, who played for FC Sachsen Leipzig, FC Rot-Weiß Erfurt, and FC Carl Zeiss Jena. He now owns a fashion business in Erfurt.
