= Pavel Dochev =

Bulgarian footballer

Personal information
- Date of birth: 28 September 1965 (age 61)
- Place of birth: Sofia, Bulgaria
- Height: 1.76 m (5 ft 9 in)
- Position: Defender

Senior career*
| Years | Team | Apps | (Gls) |
| 1984–1991 | Lokomotiv Sofia | 168 | (4) |
| 1991–1992 | CSKA Sofia | 29 | (1) |
| 1992–1993 | Hamburger SV | 8 | (0) |
| 1993–1994 | CSKA Sofia | 21 | (1) |
| 1994–1995 | Holstein Kiel | 27 | (5) |
| 1995–2002 | SC Paderborn | 208 | (21) |
| Total | | 461 | (32) |

International career
| 1987–1994 | Bulgaria | 24 | (0) |

Managerial career
- 2003–2005: SC Paderborn
- 2005–2008: Rot-Weiß Erfurt
- 2008–2009: SC Paderborn
- 2010: CSKA Sofia
- 2010–2011: SV Sandhausen
- 2012–2013: Preußen Münster
- 2015–2017: Erzgebirge Aue
- 2017–2019: Hansa Rostock
- 2019–2021: Viktoria Köln
- 2021: MSV Duisburg
- 2022: Erzgebirge Aue
- 2022–2024: Erzgebirge Aue
- 2025–2026: SSV Ulm
- * Club domestic league appearances and goals

Pavel Dochev (Bulgarian: Павел Дочев) (born 28 September 1965) is a Bulgarian football coach and former player. A defender, since his retirement from professional football in 2002 Dochev has managed several teams, mostly in Germany.

== Coaching career ==
Before being appointed as the new manager of Hansa Rostock, he previously managed Erzgebirge Aue, with whom he finished second in the 2015–16 3. Liga season, thus gaining direct return to the 2. Bundesliga after just one season. During the same season, he won the regional cup of Saxony.
