= Eins Erzgebirgsstadion =

Association football stadium in Aue, Germany

Coordinates: 50°35′52″N 12°42′40″E

eins Erzgebirgsstadion
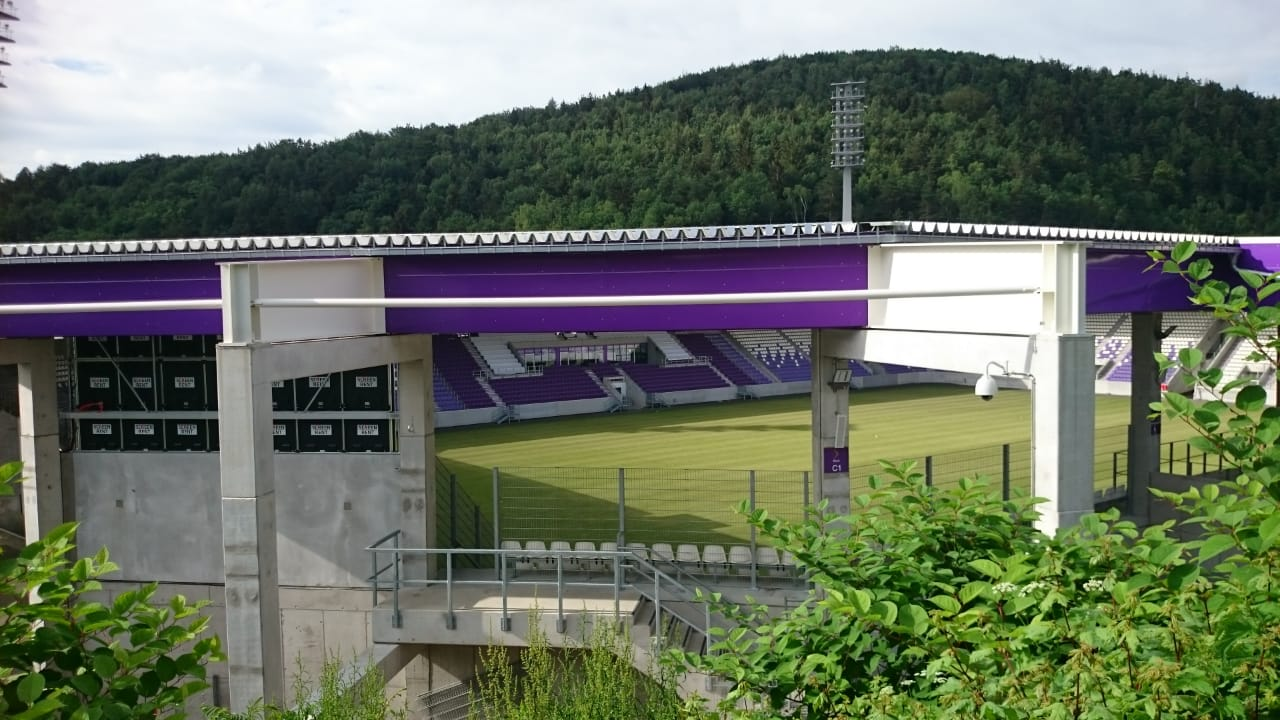
- Interactive map of eins Erzgebirgsstadion
- Former names: Städtisches Stadion (1928–1950); Otto-Grotewohl-Stadion (1950–1991); Erzgebirgsstadion (1991–2011); Sparkassen-Erzgebirgsstadion (2011–2017); Erzgebirgsstadion (2017-2025) eins Erzgebirgsstadion (since 2025)
- Address: Gerd-Schädlich-Platz 1; 08280 Aue-Bad Schlema
- Location: Aue, Saxony
- Owner: Town of Aue-Bad Schlema
- Capacity: 15.500
- Surface: Natural grass

Construction
- Opened: 27 May 1928
- Renovated: 1950, 1986–1992; 2010, 2015–2017
- Cost: 17.3 million

Tenant
- FC Erzgebirge Aue (1950–present)

The eins Erzgebirgsstadion is a football stadium in Aue-Bad Schlema, Saxony, Germany. It is the home ground of 3. Liga football club FC Erzgebirge Aue.

== History ==
The earliest stadium on this site was known the "Städtisches Stadion" and was opened on 29 May 1928. It was opened as a multi-purpose sports venue, featuring a playing field and an athletics track.

After the establishment of the German Democratic Republic, the stadium was completely rebuilt in 1950 over a 4-month period. The stadium was opened on 20 August 1950 and was named "Otto Grotewohl Stadium", in honour of the then East German Prime Minister, Otto Grotewohl. Between 1986 and 1992, the stadium was subject to large-scale renovations, and the stadium was renamed to Erzgebirgsstadion in 1991. The stadium has since been redeveloped in 2010, and again in 2017.

== Gallery ==
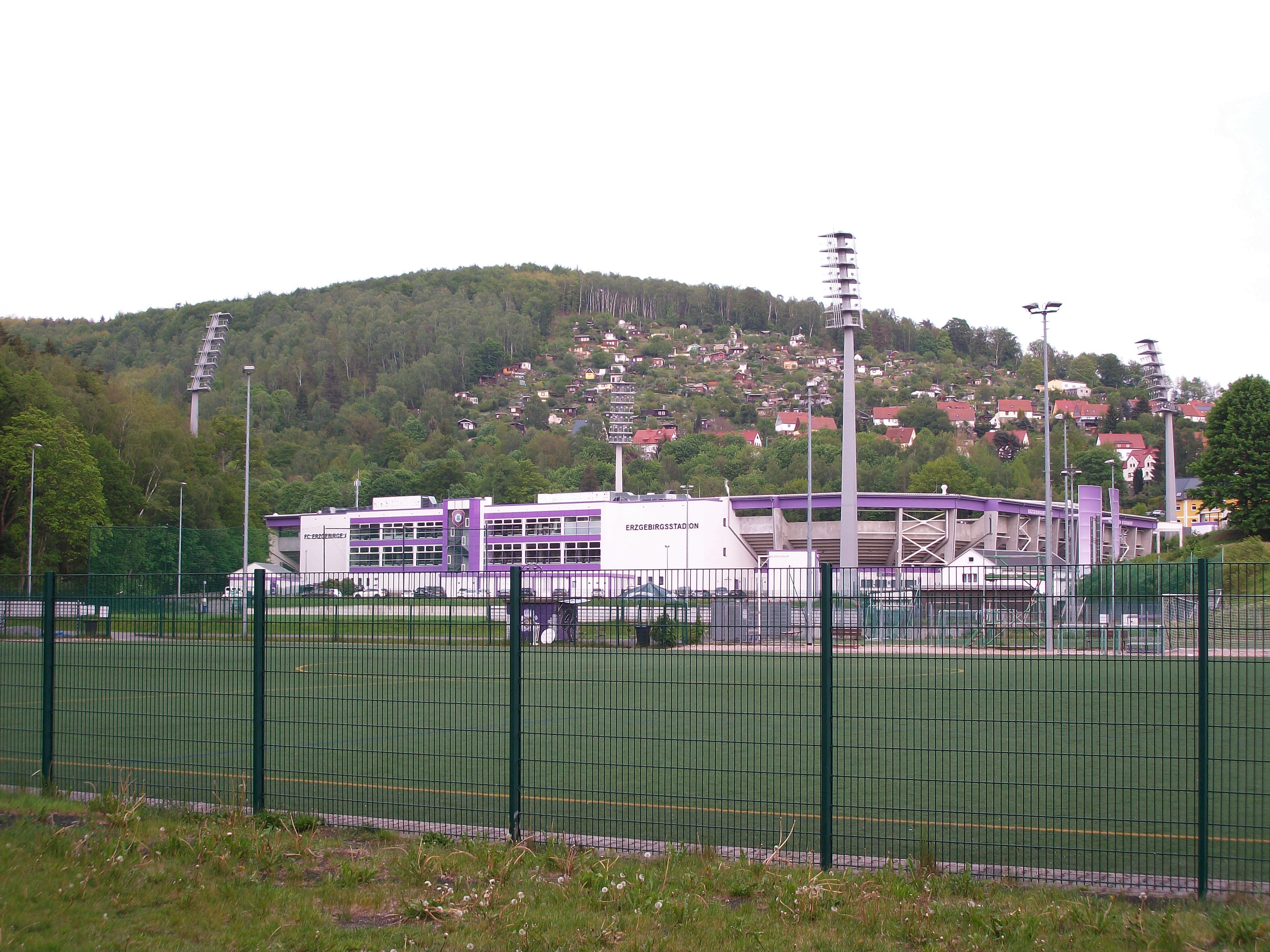

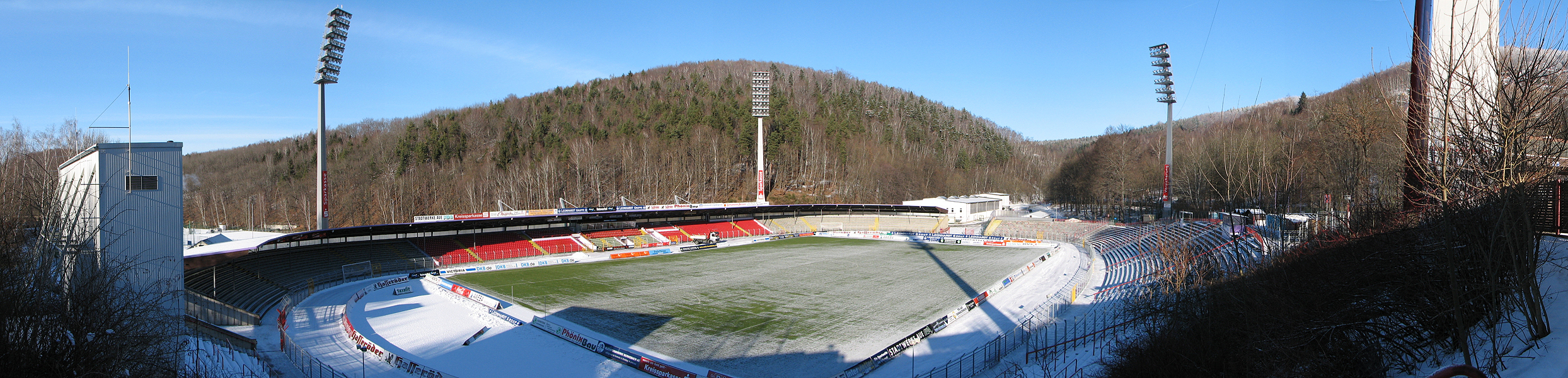
