= 2019–20 FC Erzgebirge Aue season =

Erzgebirge Aue
2019–20 season
- Chairman: Helge Leonhardt
- Manager: Dirk Schuster
- Stadium: Erzgebirgsstadion
- 2. Bundesliga: 7th
- DFB-Pokal: Second round
- Highest home attendance: 15,500 vs Dynamo Dresden, 2. Bundesliga, 29 September 2019
- Lowest home attendance: 8,000 vs Arminia Bielefeld, 2. Bundesliga, 31 January 2020
- Average home league attendance: 11,558 (Note: Only matches with spectators present are included in the average.)
Home colours	Away colours	Third colours

The 2019–20 FC Erzgebirge Aue season was the 74th season in the football club's history. They competed in the 2. Bundesliga, the second tier of German football, in which they finished 7th, and the DFB-Pokal, where they were eliminated in the second round. They played their home matches at the Erzgebirgsstadion, located in Aue, Saxony, Germany.

== Season summary ==
Erzgebirge Aue finished 14th in the 2. Bundesliga during the 2018–19 season. On 26 August 2019, Dirk Schuster was appointed as the new head coach of Erzgebirge Aue. The club finished 7th on 47 points.

== Players ==
As of emd of season

=== First-team squad ===
No.	Name	Position	Nat.	Place of birth	Date of birth	Signed from
Goalkeepers
1	Martin Männel	GK	(Germany)	Hennigsdorf	16 March 1988	FC Energie Cottbus
34	Daniel Haas	GK	(Germany)	Erlenbach am Main	1 August 1983	Union Berlin
40	Robert Jendrusch	GK	(Germany)	Bad Schlema	28 May 1996	—
Defenders
3	Marko Mihojević	DF	(Bosnia and Herzegovina)	Trebinje	21 April 1996	on loan from PAOK
4	Fabian Kalig	DF	(Germany)	Wiesbaden	28 March 1993	1. FSV Mainz 05 II
12	Steve Breitkreuz	CB	(Germany)	Berlin	18 January 1992	Eintracht Braunschweig
15	Dennis Kempe	CB	(Germany)	Wesel	24 June 1986	Karlsruher SC
20	Calogero Rizzuto	DF	(Germany)	Saarbrücken	5 January 1992	1. FC Kaiserslautern II
21	Malcolm Cacutalua	DF	(Germany)	Troisdorf	15 November 1994	Arminia Bielefeld
26	Sören Gonther	CB	(Germany)	Schrecksbach	15 December 1986	Dynamo Dresden
36	Filip Kusić	DF	(Serbia)	Munich	3 June 1996	1. FC Köln
Midfielders
5	Clemens Fandrich	MF	(Germany)	Cottbus	10 January 1991	FC Luzern
7	Jan Hochscheidt	MF	(Germany)	Trier	4 October 1987	Eintracht Braunschweig
8	Tom Baumgart	MF	(Germany)	Freiberg	12 November 1997	Chemnitzer FC
13	Louis Samson	MF	(Germany)	Berlin	3 July 1995	Eintracht Braunschweig
16	Erik Majetschak	MF	(Germany)	Bad Lausick	1 March 2000	RB Leipzig
17	Philipp Riese	MF	(Germany)	Meuselwitz	12 November 1989	1. FC Heidenheim
23	Nicolás Sessa	MF	(Germany)	Stuttgart	23 March 1996	VfR Aalen
24	John-Patrick Strauß	MF	(Philippines)	Wetzlar	28 January 1996	RB Leipzig II
25	Dominik Wydra	MF	(Austria)	Vienna	21 March 1994	VfL Bochum
Forwards
10	Dimitrij Nazarov	FW	(Azerbaijan)	Taiynsha	4 April 1990	Karlsruher SC
11	Florian Krüger	CF	(Germany)	Staßfurt	13 February 1999	—
14	Philipp Zulechner	FW	(Austria)	Vienna	12 April 1990	SK Sturm Graz
27	Njegoš Kupusović	WF	(Serbia)	Serbia	22 February 2001	on loan from Red Star Belgrade
33	Christoph Daferner	FW	(Germany)	Pöttmes	12 January 1998	on loan from SC Freiburg
37	Pascal Testroet	FW	(Germany)	Bocholt	26 September 1990	Dynamo Dresden

=== Left club during season ===
No.	Name	Position	Nat.	Place of birth	Date of birth	Joined
Defenders
22	Niklas Jeck	DF	(Germany)	Stollberg	18 September 2001	VfB Auerbach (loan)
39	Paul Horschig	DF	(Germany)	Görlitz	1 March 2000	VfB Auerbach (loan)
—	Sascha Härtel	DF	(Germany)	Bad Schlema	9 March 1999	FSV Zwickau (loan)
Midfielders
6	Hikmet Çiftçi	MF	(Turkey)	Neuss	10 March 1998	1. FC Kaiserslautern
38	Robert Herrmann	MF	(Germany)	Strausberg	10 August 1993	Würzburger Kickers (loan)

== Transfers ==
=== Transfers in ===
Date	Position	Nationality	Name	From	Fee	Ref.
12 June 2019	MF	(Turkey)	Hikmet Çiftçi	1. FC Köln II	Free	
14 June 2019	MF	(Germany)	Nicolás Sessa	VfR Aalen	Free	
20 June 2019	MF	(Germany)	Erik Majetschak	RB Leipzig	Free	
29 June 2019	DF	(Germany)	Sören Gonther	Dynamo Dresden	Undisclosed	

=== Loans in ===
Date from	Position	Nationality	Name	From	Date until	Ref.
17 June 2019	FW	(Germany)	Christoph Daferner	SC Freiburg	30 June 2020	
20 June 2019	FW	(Serbia)	Njegoš Kupusović	Red Star Belgrade	30 June 2020	
4 July 2019	DF	(Bosnia and Herzegovina)	Marko Mihojević	PAOK	30 June 2020	
12 January 2020	DF	(Denmark)	Jacob Rasmussen	ACF Fiorentina	30 June 2020	

=== Transfers out ===
Date	Position	Nationality	Name	To	Fee	Ref.
6 June 2019	DF	(Germany)	Luke Hemmerich	Würzburger Kickers	Free	
27 June 2019	MF	(Bosnia and Herzegovina)	Mario Kvesić	1. FC Magdeburg	Free	
5 July 2019	MF	(Germany)	Elias Löder	Germania Halberstadt	Free	
2 August 2019	GK	(Germany)	Maximilian Schlosser	VfB Auerbach	Free	
8 January 2020	MF	(Turkey)	Hikmet Çiftçi	1. FC Kaiserslautern	Free	

=== Loans out ===
Date from	Position	Nationality	Name	To	Date until	Ref.
19 June 2019	MF	(Germany)	Sascha Härtel	FSV Zwickau	30 June 2020	
16 August 2019	DF	(Germany)	Robert Herrmann	Würzburger Kickers	30 June 2020	
30 August 2019	DF	(Germany)	Niklas Jeck	VfB Auerbach	30 June 2020	
31 August 2019	MF	(Germany)	Paul Horschig	VfB Auerbach	30 June 2020	

== Friendly matches ==
19 June 2019	SV BW Albernau	0–26	Erzgebirge Aue	Zschorlau
18:00 CEST		Report	Daferner 9', 24', 27', 35', 36'; Hochscheidt 14', 21'; Testroet 19', 20', 34', 42', 44'; Çiftçi 48', 54'; Mause 62', 76', 85', 90'; Krüger 65', 69', 72'; Strauß 73'; Rizzuto 74'; Soares 75'; Fandrich 83'; Sessa 86'	Stadium: Sportplatz Albernau Zschorlau; Attendance: 2,054; Referee: Christian Schlömann

21 June 2019	SC Syrau	0–4	Erzgebirge Aue	Syrau
18:00 CEST		Report	Krüger 27'; Herrmann 55'; Horschig 57'; Baumgart 80'	Stadium: Waldstadion; Attendance: 1,170; Referee: Tim Ziegler

22 June 2019	TSV Geyer	0–22	Erzgebirge Aue	Geyer
13:30 CEST		Report	Testroet 2', 24', 37'; Zulechner 7', 18', 28'; Çiftçi 20', 45'; Herrmann 36'; Zejnullahu 41'; Rizzuto 51', 59'; Krüger 56', 60', 79'; Mause 70', 78', 80', 81', 84'; Kupusović 71'; Majetshak 73'	Stadium: Sportplatz Geyer; Attendance: 2,178; Referee: Rico Teichmann

26 June 2019	1. FC Lokomotive Leipzig	1–3	Erzgebirge Aue	Leipzig
18:30 CEST	Mvibudulu 2'	Report	Testroet 36', 45'; Zulechner 50'	Stadium: Bruno-Plache-Stadion; Attendance: 963; Referee: Stefan Prager

29 June 2019	Energie Cottbus	2–3	Erzgebirge Aue	Cottbus
14:00 CEST	Beyazıt 66', 86' (pen.)	kicker Erzgebirge Aue		Stadium: Stadion der Freundschaft; Attendance: 1,308; Referee: Daniel Köppen

9 July 2019	Erzgebirge Aue	3–1	Viktoria Berlin	Baabe
18:00 CEST	Kusić 83'; Testroet 95'; Rizzuto 100'	Report	Menz 53'	Stadium: Insel Rügen; Attendance: 843; Referee: Christoph Dallmann

12 July 2019	Erzgebirge Aue	2–1	FC Fredericia	Baabe
18:00 CEST	Krüger 76'; Daferner 80'	Report	Strauß 7' (o.g.)	Stadium: Insel Rügen; Attendance: 700; Referee: Christian Allwardt

17 July 2019	Erzgebirge Aue	4–1	Hertha BSC	Aue
18:00 CEST	Testroet 27'; Nazarov 41'; Çiftçi 45'; Baumgart 79'	kicker Erzgebirge Aue	Selke 74'	Stadium: Erzgebirgsstadion; Attendance: 3,332

20 July 2019	Erzgebirge Aue	1–1	1. FC Union Berlin	Aue
16:00 CEST	Daferner 85'	kicker Erzgebirge Aue	Ujah 17'	Stadium: Erzgebirgsstadion; Referee: Martin Bärmann

13 August 2019	ZFC Meuselwitz	1–2	Erzgebirge Aue	Meuselwitz
18:00 CEST	Albert 79'	Report	Daferner 19'; Sessa 63'	Stadium: bluechip-Arena; Attendance: 905; Referee: Daniel Kresin

7 September 2019	VfB Auerbach	0–1	Erzgebirge Aue	Auerbach
13:30 CEST		Report	Zulechner 70'	Stadium: VfB Stadion; Attendance: 1,050; Referee: Lars Albert

10 October 2019	Erzgebirge Aue	2–3	Hallescher FC	Aue
14:00 CEST	Zulechner 15', 27'	Report	Guttau 24'; Nietfeld 30'; Vollert 71'	Stadium: Erzgebirgsstadion; Referee: Lars Albert

10 January 2020	1. FC Magdeburg	1–1	Erzgebirge Aue	Novo Sancti Petri
16:00 CET	Steininger 71'	Report	Nazarov 80'

14 January 2020	Erzgebirge Aue	2–3	SpVgg Unterhaching	Novo Sancti Petri
15:00 CET	Nazarov 31'; Krüger 35'	Report	Dombrowka 10'; Hain 79', 85'	Referee: Ernesto Pereira

21 January 2020	Erzgebirge Aue	3–1	1. FC Lokomotive Leipzig	Aue
18:30 CET	Krüger 3'; Kempe 39'; Testroet 86'	Report	Steinborn 45'	Stadium: Erzgebirgsstadion; Attendance: 730; Referee: Alexander Sather

== Competitions ==
=== 2. Bundesliga ===
==== League table ====
Pos	Team	Pld	W	D	L	GF	GA	GD	Pts
5	Darmstadt 98	34	13	13	8	48	43	+5	52
6	Hannover 96	34	13	9	12	54	49	+5	48
7	Erzgebirge Aue	34	13	8	13	46	48	−2	47
8	VfL Bochum	34	11	13	10	53	51	+2	46
9	Greuther Fürth	34	11	11	12	46	45	+1	44

Source: DFB
Rules for classification: 1) Points; 2) Goal difference; 3) Goals scored; 4) Head-to-head points; 5) Head-to-head goal difference; 6) Head-to-head away goals scored; 7) Away goals scored; 8) Play-off.

==== Results ====
28 July 2019 1	Greuther Fürth	0–2	Erzgebirge Aue	Fürth
15:30 CEST	Wittek (yellow card) 46'	Report	Nazarov 25'; Kalig (yellow card) 56'; Riese (yellow card) 60'; Fandrich (yellow card) 66'; Baumgart (yellow card) 85'; Hochscheidt 90'	Stadium: Sportpark Ronhof Thomas Sommer; Attendance: 9,970; Referee: Daniel Siebert

4 August 2019 2	Erzgebirge Aue	3–2	SV Wehen Wiesbaden	Aue
15:30 CEST	Krüger 19'; Nazarov 35' (yellow card) 40'; Testroet (yellow card) 48'; Sören Gonther (yellow card) 55'; Baumgart 82'; Mihojević (yellow card) 90+5'	Report	Ajani (yellow card) 23'; Tietz (yellow card) 36' (goal) 43'; Lorch (yellow card) 76'; Sebastian Mrowca (yellow card) 79'; Dittgen 89' (yellow card) 90'	Stadium: Erzgebirgsstadion; Attendance: 9,500; Referee: Robert Kempter

17 August 2019 3	Arminia Bielefeld	3–1	Erzgebirge Aue	Bielefeld
13:00 CEST	Nilsson 21'; Klos 60'; Prietl (yellow card) 81'; Voglsammer 85' (pen.)	Report	Nazarov (yellow card) 47'; Kusić (yellow card) 52'; Daferner 76'; Zulechner (yellow card) 90+2'	Stadium: Bielefelder Alm; Attendance: 15,021; Referee: Martin Thomsen

23 August 2019 4	Erzgebirge Aue	0–0	VfB Stuttgart	Aue
18:30 CEST	Riese (yellow card) 80'	Report	Sosa (yellow card) 10' (yellow-red card) 67'; Badstuber (yellow card) 27'; Castro 45+3'; González (yellow card) 88'; Divadi (yellow card) 90+8'	Stadium: Erzgebirgsstadion; Attendance: 13,950; Referee: Felix Zwayer

1 September 2019 5	Holstein Kiel	1–1	Erzgebirge Aue	Kiel
13:30 CEST	Lee (yellow card) 35' (goal) 73' van den Bergh (yellow card) 42'; Ignjovski (yellow card) 90+4'	Report	Gonther (yellow card) 45+1'; Hochscheidt 48'; Nazarov (penalty missed) 54'; Kalig (yellow card) 82'; Riese (yellow card) 90+2'	Stadium: Holstein-Stadion; Attendance: 9,465; Referee: Lasse Koslowski

15 September 2019 6	Erzgebirge Aue	1–0	VfL Osnabrück	Aue
13:30 CEST	Baumgart 40'; Rizzuto (yellow card) 61' (yellow-red card) 75'	Report	van Aken (yellow card) 18'; Wolze (yellow card) 34'; Álvarez (yellow card) 59'; Taffertshofer (yellow card) 69'; Heyer (yellow card) 71'	Stadium: Erzgebirgsstadion; Attendance: 9,750; Referee: Thorben Siewer

22 September 2019 7	Hamburger SV	4–0	Erzgebirge Aue	Hamburg
13:30 CEST	Vagnoman 18'; Hinterseer 32'; Harnik 47'; Hunt 62' van Drongelen (yellow card) 70'	Report	Daferner (yellow card) 37'; Fandrich (yellow card) 66'; Strauß (yellow card) 75'	Stadium: Volksparkstadion; Attendance: 44,021; Referee: Tobias Reichel

29 September 2019 8	Erzgebirge Aue	4–1	Dynamo Dresden	Aue
13:30 CEST	Nazarov 27' (pen.), 39' (yellow card) 54'; Testroet 45+1', 70'; Kalig (yellow card) 77'; Gonther (yellow card) 82'	Report	Koné 18'; Atik (yellow card) 64'; Hartmann (yellow card) 66'	Stadium: Erzgebirgsstadion; Attendance: 15,500; Referee: Robert Hartmann

5 October 2019 9	SV Sandhausen	2–2	Erzgebirge Aue	Sandhausen
13:00 CEST	Bouhaddouz 16'; Behrens 26'; Nauber (yellow card) 40'; Biada (yellow card) 45'	Report	Zhirov 5' (o.g.); Rizzuto (yellow card) 37'; Mihojević (yellow card) 59'; Fandrich (yellow card) 71'> Testroet 77' (pen.)	Stadium: BWT-Stadion am Hardtwald; Attendance: 5,042; Referee: Christof Günsch

18 October 2019 10	Erzgebirge Aue	4–3	1. FC Nürnberg	Aue
18:30 CEST	Nazarov 62' (pen.); Hochscheidt 75'; Mihojević 86' (yellow card) 90+9'; Testroet (yellow card) 90+1'; Krüger 90+4'; Männel (yellow card) 90+9'	Report	Frey 51' (penalty missed) 90+10'; Sørensen (red card) 61'; Geis 78', 90+2' (pen.); Mühl (yellow card) 90+3'	Stadium: Erzgebirgsstadion; Attendance: 14,000; Referee: Daniel Schlager

25 October 2019 11	SV Darmstadt 98	1–0	Erzgebirge Aue	Darmstadt
18:30 CEST	Herrmann (yellow card) 33'; Dursun (yellow card) 73'; Holland (yellow card) 86'; Đumić 87'; Skarke (yellow card) 90'	Report		Stadium: Merck-Stadion am Böllenfalltor; Attendance: 14,095; Referee: Manuel Gräfe

2 November 2019 12	Erzgebirge Aue	1–1	1. FC Heidenheim	Aue
13:00 CET	Fandrich (yellow card) 25'; Riese 54'; Männel (yellow card) 80'; Rizzuto (yellow card) 89'	Report	Kleindienst (yellow card) 26'; Schmidt (yellow card) 20'; Griesbeck (yellow card) 34'; Hüsing (yellow card) 49'; Schimmer 88'; Multhaup (yellow card) 90+2'	Stadium: Erzgebirgsstadion; Attendance: 8,700; Referee: Florian Heft

11 November 2019 13	Karlsruher SC	1–1	Erzgebirge Aue	Karlsruhe
20:30 CET	Fink 64'	Report	Hochscheidt 7' (red card) 41'; Riese (yellow card) 48'; Rizzuto (yellow card) 55'; Männel (yellow card) 89'	Stadium: Wildparkstadion; Attendance: 12,283; Referee: Sven Waschitzki

22 November 2019 14	Erzgebirge Aue	3–1	FC St. Pauli	Aue
18:30 CET	Krüger 14'; Nazarov 24' (pen.); Riese (yellow card) 55'; Testroet 62'; Fandrich (yellow card) 88'	Report	Ohlsson (yellow card) 33'; Veerman 56'	Stadium: Erzgebirgsstadion; Attendance: 14,000; Referee: Markus Schmidt

30 November 2019 15	VfL Bochum	2–0	Erzgebirge Aue	Bochum
13:00 CET	Losilla (yellow card) 32' (goal) 61'; Soares (yellow card) 71'; Samson 90+4' (o.g.)	Report	Mihojević (yellow card) 29' (red card) 84'; Baumgart (yellow card) 72'; Zulechner (yellow card) 81'	Stadium: Ruhrstadion; Attendance: 14,794; Referee: Patrick Alt

7 December 2019 16	Hannover 96	3–2	Erzgebirge Aue	Hanover
13:00 CET	Bakalorz 32'; Anton (yellow card) 46'; Stendera (yellow card) 61'; Weydandt 75'; Haraguchi 90'	Report	Strauß 16'; Bakalorz 49' (o.g.); Krüger (yellow card) 57'; Riese (yellow card) 74'; Gonther (yellow card) 90+3'	Stadium: Niedersachsenstadion; Attendance: 26,200; Referee: Michael Bacher

13 December 2019 17	Erzgebirge Aue	1–0	Jahn Regensburg	Aue
18:30 CET	Gonther 44'	Report	Besuschkow (yellow card) 29'; Gimber (yellow card) 57'; Saller (yellow card) 62'	Stadium: Erzgebirgsstadion; Attendance: 8,300; Referee: Johann Pfeifer

21 December 2019 18	Erzgebirge Aue	3–1	Greuther Fürth	Aue
13:00 CET	Hochscheidt 13'; Nazarov 64' (pen.); Krüger 66'; Fandrich (yellow card) 88'	Report	Raum (yellow card) 29'; Hrgota (yellow card) 38' (goal) 80' (pen.); Mavraj (yellow card) 82'; Mohr (yellow card) 90+2'	Stadium: Erzgebirgsstadion; Attendance: 13,200; Referee: Martin Thomsen

28 January 2020 19	SV Wehen Wiesbaden	1–0	Erzgebirge Aue	Wiesbaden
20:30 CET	Aigner (yellow card) 7'; Chato 14'; Mrowca (yellow card) 21' (red card) 68'; Röcker (yellow card) 39'; Dittgen (yellow card) 51'; Kyereh (yellow card) 60'	Report	Rizzuto (yellow card) 36'	Stadium: Brita-Arena; Attendance: 4,037; Referee: Patrick Ittrich

31 January 2020 20	Erzgebirge Aue	0–0	Arminia Bielefeld	Aue
18:30 CET	Rizzuto (yellow card) 21'; Mihojević (yellow card) 68'; Kempe (yellow card) 74'	Report	Brunner (yellow card) 24'; Edmundsson (yellow card) 77'	Stadium: Erzgebirgsstadion; Attendance: 8,000; Referee: Guido Winkmann

8 February 2020 21	VfB Stuttgart	3–0	Erzgebirge Aue	Stuttgart
13:00 CET	González (yellow card) 6'; Karazor (yellow card) 15'; Didavi 34', 42'; Phillips (yellow card) 45+2'; Gómez 90+1'	Report	Gonther (yellow card) 35'; Nazarov (yellow card) 56'	Stadium: Mercedes-Benz Arena; Attendance: 50,846; Referee: René Rohde

16 February 2020 22	Erzgebirge Aue	1–2	Holstein Kiel	Aue
13:30 CET	Fandrich (yellow card) 22'; Riese (yellow card) 49'; Nazarov 70'; Samson (yellow card) 77'	Report	Özcan 42'; Iyoha 63' (yellow card) 90+3'; Thesker (yellow card) 67'	Stadium: Erzgebirgsstadion; Attendance: 8,700; Referee: Robert Kampka

21 February 2020 23	VfL Osnabrück	0–0	Erzgebirge Aue	Osnabrück
18:30 CET	Taffertshofer (yellow card) 45+2'	Report	Strauß (yellow card) 38'; Baumgart (yellow card) 61'; Rizzuto (yellow card) 68'	Stadium: Stadion an der Bremer Brücke; Attendance: 14,014; Referee: Martin Thomsen

29 February 2020 24	Erzgebirge Aue	3–0	Hamburger SV	Aue
13:00 CET	Baumgart (yellow card) 16'; Testroet 39'; Männel (yellow card) 59'; Hochscheidt 74', 88'	Report	Hunt (yellow card) 38'; Jung (yellow card) 45' (red card) 59'; Beyer (yellow card) 56' van Drongelen (yellow card) 75'	Stadium: Erzgebirgsstadion; Attendance: 15,100; Referee: Nicolas Winter

8 March 2020 25	Dynamo Dresden	2–1	Erzgebirge Aue	Dresden
13:30 CET	Donyoh (yellow card) 21'; Petrák (yellow card) 24'; Schmidt 44', 59'	Report	Hochscheidt 6'; Rasmussen (yellow card) 22'; Baumgart (yellow card) 43'; Rizzuto (yellow card) 86' (red card) 90+2'	Stadium: Rudolf-Harbig-Stadion; Attendance: 30,573; Referee: Manuel Gräfe

14 March 2020	Erzgebirge Aue	v	SV Sandhausen	Aue
13:00 CET		Report		Stadium: Erzgebirgsstadion
Note: Match postponed on 13 March 2020 due to outbreak of SARS-CoV-2

22 March 2020	1. FC Nürnberg	v	Erzgebirge Aue	Nuremberg
13:30 CET		Report		Stadium: Max-Morlock-Stadion
Note: Match postponed on 16 March 2020 due to outbreak of SARS-CoV-2

5 April 2020	Erzgebirge Aue	v	SV Darmstadt 98	Aue
13:30 CEST				Stadium: Erzgebirgsstadion
Note: Match postponed on 24 March 2020 due to fears over coronavirus pandemic.

12 April 2020	1. FC Heidenheim	v	Erzgebirge Aue	Heidenheim an der Brenz
				Stadium: Voith-Arena
Note: Match postponed on 24 March 2020 due to fears over coronavirus pandemic.

19 April 2020	Erzgebirge Aue	v	Karlsruher SC	Aue
				Stadium: Erzgebirgsstadion
Note: Match postponed on 24 March 2020 due to fears over coronavirus pandemic.

26 April 2020	FC St. Pauli	v	Erzgebirge Aue	Hamburg
				Stadium: Millerntor-Stadion
Note: Match postponed on 24 March 2020 due to fears over coronavirus pandemic.

3 May 2020	Erzgebirge Aue	v	VfL Bochum	Aue
				Stadium: Erzgebirgsstadion
Note: Match postponed on 24 March 2020 due to fears over coronavirus pandemic.

10 May 2020	Erzgebirge Aue	v	Hannover 96	Aue
				Stadium: Erzgebirgsstadion
Note: Match postponed on 24 March 2020 due to fears over coronavirus pandemic.

16 May 2020 26	Erzgebirge Aue	3–1	SV Sandhausen	Aue
13:00 CEST	Nazarov 5' (pen.); Krüger (yellow card) 43' (goal) 64'; Cacutalua 70'	Report	Diekmeier (red card) 4'; Taffertshofer (yellow card) 23'; Scheu (yellow card) 46'; Biada 80'	Stadium: Erzgebirgsstadion; Attendance: 0 (Note: Match played behind closed doors); Referee: Florian Badstübner

22 May 2020 27	1. FC Nürnberg	1–1	Erzgebirge Aue	Nuremberg
18:30 CEST	Nürnberger (yellow card) 30'; Sørensen (yellow card) 43'; Gonther 63' (o.g.); Mavropanos (yellow card) 76'; Hack (yellow card) 83'; Frey (yellow card) 90+1'	Report	Nazarov 51'; Fandrich (yellow card) 76'; Rasmussen (yellow card) 90'; Männel (yellow card) 90+3'	Stadium: Max-Morlock-Stadion; Attendance: 0 Referee: Felix Brych

26 May 2020 28	Erzgebirge Aue	1–3	SV Darmstadt 98	Aue
18:30 CEST	Krüger 8'; Rasmussen (yellow card) 14'; Kempe (yellow card) 55'; Hochscheidt (yellow card) 60'	Report	Kempe 19' (pen.) (yellow card) 45+1'; Rapp (yellow card) 40'; Dursun 72', 81'	Stadium: Erzgebirgsstadion; Attendance: 0 Referee: Christof Günsch

31 May 2020 29	1. FC Heidenheim	3–0	Erzgebirge Aue	Heidenheim an der Brenz
13:30 CEST	Schnatterer (penalty missed) 24'; Rizzuto 48' (o.g.); Busch (yellow card) 56'; Kerschbaumer 58'; Schimmer 86'	Report	Rizzuto (yellow card) 23'; Rasmussen (yellow card) 45'; Riese (yellow card) 90+1'	Stadium: Voith-Arena; Attendance: 0 Referee: Robert Kempter

7 June 2020 30	Erzgebirge Aue	1–0	Karlsruher SC	Aue
13:30 CEST	Krüger 10'; Fandrich (yellow card) 68'	Report	Fröde (yellow card) 43'; Ben-Hatira (yellow card) 88'	Stadium: Erzgebirgsstadion; Attendance: 0 Referee: Daniel Siebert

14 June 2020 31	FC St. Pauli	2–1	Erzgebirge Aue	Hamburg
13:30 CEST	Østigård (yellow card) 11'; Penney (yellow card) 16'; Diamantakos 22' (penalty missed) 45+2'; Veerman 41'	Report	Rasmussen (yellow card) 45+1'; Gonther 74'; Strauß (yellow card) 80'	Stadium: Millerntor-Stadion; Attendance: 0 Referee: Thorben Siewer

17 June 2020 32	Erzgebirge Aue	1–2	VfL Bochum	Aue
18:30 CEST	Riese (yellow card) 21'; Nazarov (yellow card) 73'; Samson (yellow card) 83' (red card) 86'; Daferner (yellow card) 90+3'; Kupusović 90+5'	Report	Losilla (yellow card) 9' (goal) 42'; Eisfeld 29'; Osei-Tutu (yellow card) 58'; Janelt (yellow card) 74'; Pantović (red card) 87'	Stadium: Erzgebirgsstadion; Attendance: 0 Referee: Lasse Koslowski

21 June 2020 33	Erzgebirge Aue	2–1	Hannover 96	Aue
15:30 CEST	Testroet 23'; Baumgart (yellow card) 64'; Fandrich 67'	Report	Anton (yellow card) 16'; Franke (yellow card) 55'; Ducksch 79'; Guidetti (yellow card) 90+1'	Stadium: Erzgebirgsstadion; Attendance: 0 Referee: Florian Badstübner

28 June 2020 34	Jahn Regensburg	1–2	Erzgebirge Aue	Regensburg
15:30 CEST	Makridis 2'; Correia (yellow card) 39'; Grüttner (yellow card) 45+2'; Gimber (yellow card) 63'; Geipl (yellow card) 81'	Report	Cacutalua (yellow card) 25'; Fandrich (yellow card) 36'; Testroet 45+3'; Kempe (yellow card) 50'; Rasmussen (yellow card) 85'; Zulechner 87'	Stadium: Arena Regensburg; Attendance: 0 Referee: Johann Pfeifer

=== DFB-Pokal ===
10 August 2019 First round	Wacker Nordhausen	1–4	Erzgebirge Aue	Nordhausen
15:30 CEST	Kammlott (yellow card) 21'; Mickels 22' (yellow card) 44'; Becker (yellow card) 50' (red card) 74'; Heidinger (yellow card) 76'	Report	Baumgart 38' (yellow card) 53'; Hochschieidt 57'; Rizzuto (yellow card) 68'; Testroet 80', 84'	Stadium: Albert-Kuntz-Sportpark; Attendance: 4,347; Referee: Christof Günsch

30 October 2019 Second round	Fortuna Düsseldorf	2–1	Erzgebirge Aue	Düsseldorf
20:45 CET	Gießelmann (yellow card) 34'; Hennings 45' (pen.); Sobottka (yellow card) 50'; Nuhu 75'	Report	Krüger 12'; Samson (yellow card) 81'	Stadium: Merkur Spiel-Arena; Attendance: 20,141; Referee: Tobias Reichel
