= 2020–21 FC Erzgebirge Aue season =

Erzgebirge Aue
2020–21 season
- Chairman: Helge Leonhardt
- Manager: Dirk Schuster
- Stadium: Erzgebirgsstadion
- 2. Bundesliga: 12th
- DFB-Pokal: First round
Home colours	Away colours	Third colours

The 2020–21 FC Erzgebirge Aue season is the club's 75th season in existence and the club's 5th consecutive season in the second flight of German football, the 2. Bundesliga, following a 7th-place finish in the previous season. The club will also participate in the DFB-Pokal.

== Friendly matches ==
Win	Draw	Loss

Date	Time (Note: Time shown in local time (CEST or CET))	Opponent	Venue	Result (Note: Erzgebirge Aue's score shown first)	Scorers	Attendance	Ref.
14 August 2020	16:00	Kickers Offenbach	Neutral	0–1 (Note: Match played over 70 minutes)	—	0 (Note: Match played behind closed doors)	
18 August 2020	16:00	Pogoń Szczecin	Neutral	4–0	Krüger (3) 51', 75', 80', Strauß 86'	0	
25 August 2020	15:00	1. FC Magdeburg	Neutral	3–1	Baumgart 25', Gnjatić 31', Zulechner 59'	452	
29 August 2020	14:00	Bayern Munich II	Neutral	3–0	Zulechner 52', Rizzuto 65', Härtel 75'	0	
5 September 2020	14:00	Erzgebirge Aue	Home	0–1	—	0	

== Competitions ==
=== 2. Bundesliga ===
==== League table ====
Pos	Team	Pld	W	D	L	GF	GA	GD	Pts
10	FC St. Pauli	34	13	8	13	51	56	−5	47
11	1. FC Nürnberg	34	11	11	12	46	51	−5	44
12	Erzgebirge Aue	34	12	8	14	44	53	−9	44
13	Hannover 96	34	12	6	16	53	51	+2	42
14	Jahn Regensburg	34	9	11	14	37	50	−13	38

Source: DFB
Rules for classification: 1) Points; 2) Goal difference; 3) Goals scored; 4) Head-to-head points; 5) Head-to-head goal difference; 6) Head-to-head away goals scored; 7) Away goals scored; 8) Play-off.

==== Matches ====
The league fixtures were announced on 7 August 2020.

Win	Draw	Loss

Match	Date	Time	Opponent	Venue	Result	Scorers	Attendance	Referee	Ref.
1	19 September 2020	13:00	Würzburger Kickers	Away	3–0	Strauß 60', Testroet 63', Baumgart 90+2'	0	Siewer	
2	25 September 2020	18:30	Greuther Fürth	Home	1–1	Krüger 23'	999	Brych	
4	18 October 2020	13:30	1. FC Heidenheim	Home	2–1	Cacutalua 54', Testroet 79'	500	Brand	
3	21 October 2020 (Note: The match was originally due to be played on 4 October 2020 at 13:30 CEST but was postponed due to positive cases of COVID-19 within Erzgebirge Aue's squad, and was rescheduled to 21 October 2020 at 18:30 CEST.)	18:30	Hamburger SV	Away	0–3	—	1,000	Günsch	
5	25 October 2020	13:30	VfL Bochum	Away	0–2	—	300	Winter	
6	31 October 2020	13:00	Holstein Kiel	Home	1–1	Krüger 2'	500	Badstübner	
7	7 November 2020	13:00	Hannover 96	Away	0–0	—	0	Bacher	
8	22 November 2020	13:30	SV Darmstadt 98	Home	3–0	Testroet 7', 56' (pen.), Nazarov 90+3'	0	Thomsen	
9	28 November 2020	13:00	SV Sandhausen	Away	4–1	Krüger 31', Zolinski 40', 63', Testroet 74'	0	Cortus	
10	6 December 2020	13:30	Jahn Regensburg	Home	0–2	—	0	Günsch	
11	13 December 2020	13:30	FC St. Pauli	Away	2–2	Testroet 10', Krüger 78'	0	Koslowski	
12	17 December 2020	20:30	Karlsruher SC	Home	4–1	Krüger 2', Testroet 19', 51', Zulechner 89'	0	Alt	
13	20 December 2020	13:30	1. FC Nürnberg	Away	0–1	—	0	Heft	
14	3 January 2021	13:30	Eintracht Braunschweig	Home	3–1	Krüger 42', 67', Testroet 88'	0	Siebert	
15	10 January 2021	13:30	SC Paderborn 07	Away	1–2	Krüger 6'	0	Thomsen	
16	16 January 2021	13:00	Fortuna Düsseldorf	Home	0–3	—	0	Günsch	
17	22 January 2021	18:30	VfL Osnabrück	Away	1–0	Strauß 13'	0	Sather	
18	26 January 2021	18:30	Würzburger Kickers	Home	2–1	Krüger 78', Ballas 85'	0	Gerach	
19	29 January 2021	18:30	Greuther Fürth	Away	0–3	—	0	Schröder	
20	5 February 2021	18:30	Hamburger SV	Home	3–3	Hochscheidt 26', Fandrich 50', Krüger 61'	0	Badstübner	
21	13 February 2021	13:00	1. FC Heidenheim	Away	0–2	—	0	Koslowski	
22	19 February 2021	18:30	VfL Bochum	Home	1–0	Bussmann 29'	0	Petersen	
23	27 February 2021	13:00	Holstein Kiel	Away	0–1	—	0	Thomsen	
24	6 March 2021	13:00	Hannover 96	Home	1–1	Testroet 64'	0	Aarnink	
25	13 March 2021	13:00	Darmstadt 98	Away	1–4	Nazarov 79' (pen.)	0	Willenborg	
26	20 March 2021	13:00	SV Sandhausen	Home	2–0	Krüger 54', Testroet 70'	0	Siewer	
27	4 April 2021	13:30	Jahn Regensburg	Away	1–1	Gonther 85'	0	Alt	
28	10 April 2021	13:00	FC St. Pauli	Home	1–3	Testroet 73'	0	Heft	
30	20 April 2021	18:30	1. FC Nürnberg	Home	0–1	—	0	Gräfe	
31	23 April 2021	18:30	Eintracht Braunschweig	Away	2–0	Nazarov 49', Zulechner 82'	0	Lechner	
29	26 April 2021 (Note: The match was originally due to be played on 17 April 2021 but was postponed and rescheduled due to an outbreak of COVID-19 within Karlsruher SC's squad.)	18:00	Karlsruher SC	Away	0–0	—	0	Thomsen	
32	9 May 2021	13:30	SC Paderborn 07	Home	3–8	Nazarov 1', 4', 56' (pen.)	0	Sather	
33	16 May 2021	15:30	Fortuna Düsseldorf	Away	0–3	—	0	Cortus	
34	23 May 2021	15:30	VfL Osnabrück	Home	2–1	Nazarov 65', 76'	0	Petersen	

=== DFB-Pokal ===
Win	Draw	Loss

Round	Date	Time	Opponent	Venue	Result	Scorers	Attendance	Referee	Ref.
First round	12 September 2020	18:30	SSV Ulm	Away	0–2	—	0	Bacher	

== Transfers ==
=== Transfers in ===
Date	Position	Name	From	Fee	Ref.
1 August 2020	DF	Florian Ballas	Dynamo Dresden	Free transfer	
1 August 2020	DF	Gaëtan Bussmann	(France) En Avant Guingamp	Free transfer	
12 August 2020	GK	Philipp Klewin	Arminia Bielefeld	Free transfer	
12 August 2020	MF	Ognjen Gnjatić	(Poland) Korona Kielce	Free transfer	
27 August 2020	GK	Kevin Harr	Hamburger SV	Free transfer	
16 September 2020	FW	Ben Zolinski	SC Paderborn 07	Free transfer	
5 October 2020	MF	Antonio Jonjić	1. FC Kaiserslautern	Undisclosed	

=== Transfers out ===
Date	Position	Name	To	Fee	Ref.
1 July 2020	MF	Dominik Wydra	Eintracht Braunschweig	Free transfer	
1 July 2020	MF	Nicolás Sessa	1. FC Kaiserslautern	Free transfer	
1 July 2020	DF	Dennis Kempe	Wehen Wiesbaden	Released	
1 July 2020	GK	Robert Jendrusch	Ingolstadt 04	Free transfer	
31 July 2020	MF	Robert Herrmann	Würzburger Kickers	Free transfer	
24 August 2020	MF	Paul Horschig	VfB Auerbach	Free transfer	
