= 2019–20 Hamburger SV season =

Hamburger SV
2019–20 season
- President: Marcell Jansen
- Manager: Dieter Hecking
- Stadium: Volksparkstadion
- 2. Bundesliga: 4th
- DFB-Pokal: Second round
- Top goalscorer: League: Sonny Kittel (11); All: Sonny Kittel (12)
- Highest home attendance: 57,000 vs. Stuttgart
- Lowest home attendance: 41,737 vs. Bochum
- Average home league attendance: 49,369
- Biggest win: 4–0 vs. Nürnberg (16 Aug. 2019); 4–0 vs. Erzgebirge Aue (22 Sep. 2019); 6–2 vs. Stuttgart (26 Oct. 2019)
- Biggest defeat: 1–5 vs Sandhausen (28 Jun. 2020)
Home colours	Away colours	Third colours
- All statistics correct as of 3 November 2019.

The 2019–20 Hamburger SV season was the 101st season in the football club's history and their second season in the 2. Bundesliga. In addition to the domestic league, Hamburger SV also participated in this season's edition of the domestic cup, the DFB-Pokal. This was the 67th season for Hamburg in the Volksparkstadion, located in Hamburg, Germany. The season covers a period from 1 July 2019 to 30 June 2020.

== Background ==
The 2018–19 season was Hamburger SV's first season in the second-tier of German football after spending 56 years in the top tier of football in Germany. During the 2018–19 season, Hamburg spent most of the first half of the season atop the 2. Bundesliga table, before a dip in form caused the team to finish fourth in the league table, missing out at a chance of promotion. Pierre-Michel Lasogga lead Hamburg in goals during the campaign scoring 19 goals across all competitions.

== Players ==
N	Pos.	Nat.	Name	Age	EU	Since	App	Goals	Ends	Transfer fee	Notes
1	GK	(Portugal)	Daniel Heuer Fernandes	33	EU	2019	3	0	2021	€1.3M	
2	DF	(Germany)	Jan Gyamerah	30	EU	2019	3	0	2021	Free	
3	DF	(Brazil)	Ewerton	37	Non-EU	2019	1	0	2020	€2.1M	
4	DF	(Netherlands)	Rick van Drongelen	27	EU	2017	54	2	2022	€3.0M	
6	MF	(Germany)	David Kinsombi	30	EU	2019	3	0	2021	€3.1M	
7	MF	(Germany)	Khaled Narey	31	EU	2018	34	8	2022	€1.8M	
8	MF	(Germany)	Jeremy Dudziak	30	EU	2019	3	1	2022	Free	
9	DF	(Greece)	Kyriakos Papadopoulos	34	EU	2017	31	1	2020	€6.7M	
10	MF	(Germany)	Sonny Kittel	33	EU	2019	3	1	2023	Free	
11	FW	(United States)	Bobby Wood	33	Non-EU	2016	57	12	2021	€4.1M	
12	GK	(Germany)	Tom Mickel	37	EU	2015	3	0	2021	Free	

- Last updated: 17 August 2019
- Source: Hamburger SV and FootballDatabase (for EU passport, country as international player, contract ending and transfer fee)
- Ordered by squad number.

== Non-competitive ==
=== Pre-season exhibitions ===
29 June 2019	Buchholz 08	1–13	Hamburger SV	Buchholz in der Nordheide
CEST				Stadium: Otto-Koch-Kampfbahn; Attendance: 44,475

10 July 2019	Olympiacos	1–1	Hamburger SV	Jenbach
CEST		Report		Stadium: Stadion Jenbach

13 July 2019	Hamburger SV	0–1	Huddersfield Town	Kitzbühel
10:00 CEST		Report		Stadium: Sportplatz Langau

20 July 2019	Hamburger SV	1–1	Anderlecht	Hamburg
7:30 CEST		Report		Stadium: Volksparkstadion

=== Midseason exhibitions ===
10 January 2020 11	Hamburger SV	0–4	Schalke 04	Hamburg, Germany
18:00 CET (UTC+1)		Report	Gregoritsch 18'; Raman 58'; Schöpf 64'; Matondo 87'	Stadium: Volksparkstadion; Attendance: 11,918; Referee: Pascal Müller (Germany)

19 January 2020 Test	Basel	0–2	Hamburger SV	St. Jakob-Park, Basel Switzerland
15:00		FCB report	10' Jeremy Dudziak; (yellow card) 66' David; 71' Sonny Kittel	Attendance: 6,489; Referee: (Switzerland) Lukas Fähndrich

== Competitive ==
=== 2. Bundesliga ===
==== Table ====
Pos	Team	Pld	W	D	L	GF	GA	GD	Pts	Promotion, qualification or relegation
2	VfB Stuttgart (P)	34	17	7	10	62	41	+21	58	Promotion to Bundesliga
3	1. FC Heidenheim	34	15	10	9	45	36	+9	55	Qualification for promotion play-offs
4	Hamburger SV	34	14	12	8	62	46	+16	54	
5	Darmstadt 98	34	13	13	8	48	43	+5	52	
6	Hannover 96	34	13	9	12	54	49	+5	48	

Source: DFB
Rules for classification: 1) Points; 2) Goal difference; 3) Goals scored; 4) Head-to-head points; 5) Head-to-head goal difference; 6) Head-to-head away goals scored; 7) Away goals scored; 8) Play-off.
(P) Promoted

==== Results by round ====
Round	1	2	3	4	5	6	7	8	9	10	11	12	13	14	15	16	17	18	19	20	21	22	23	24	25	26	27	28	29	30	31	32	33	34
Ground	H	A	H	A	H	A	H	A	H	A	H	A	A	H	A	H	A	A	H	A	H	A	H	A	H	A	H	A	H	H	A	H	A	H
Result	D	W	W	W	W	L	W	D	W	D	W	D	D	W	L	L	D	D	W	W	W	D	L	L	W	D	D	L	W	D	W	D	L	L
Position	7	3	1	1	1	2	2	2	1	1	1	1	2	1	2	2	2	2	2	2	2	3	3	3	3	2	2	3	3	3	2	3	4	4

Source: HSV Fixture List
A = Away; H = Home; W = Win; D = Draw; L = Loss

==== Results ====
Win Draw Loss

28 July 2019 1	Hamburger SV	1–1	Darmstadt 98	Hamburg
13:30 CEST	Hinterseer (yellow card) 83'; Papadopoulos (yellow card) 85'; Hunt 90+8' (pen.)	Report	Herrmann (yellow card) 44'; Skarke 46'; Đumić (yellow card) 61'; Mehlem (yellow card) 72'	Stadium: Volksparkstadion; Attendance: 44,475; Referee: Robert Hartmann

5 August 2019 2	1. FC Nürnberg	0–4	Hamburger SV	Nuremberg
14:30 CEST	Handwerker (yellow card) 45'	Report	Dudziak 12' (yellow card) 64'; Kittel 30'; Narey 72'; Handwerker 81' (o.g.)	Stadium: Max-Morlock-Stadion; Attendance: 44,497; Referee: Harm Osmers

16 August 2019 3	Hamburger SV	1–0	VfL Bochum	Hamburg
12:30 CEST	Hinterseer 60'; Jatta (yellow card) 62'	Report	Lorenz (yellow card) 40'	Stadium: Volksparkstadion; Attendance: 41,737; Referee: Christian Dingert

25 August 2019 4	Karlsruher SC	2–4	Hamburger SV	Karlsruhe
13:30 CEST	Fröde (yellow card) 44'; Gordon (yellow card) 59' (goal) 76'; Hofmann 88'	Report	Hinterseer 16' (pen.) (yellow card) 30'; Kittel 34', 67'; Gyamerah (yellow card) 54'; Fein (yellow card) 82'; Jairo 90+1'	Stadium: Wildparkstadion; Attendance: 15,000; Referee: Sören Storks

1 September 2019 5	Hamburger SV	3–0	Hannover 96	Hamburg
13:30	Kittel 35'; Kinsombi 59'; Jatta 75'	Report		Stadium: Volksparkstadion; Attendance: 54,732; Referee: Bastian Dankert

16 September 2019 6	FC St. Pauli	2–0	Hamburger SV	Hamburg
20:30	Diamantakos 18' (yellow card) 18'; van Drongelen 62' (o.g.); Ohlsson (yellow card) 72'	Report	Leibold (yellow card) 33'; Jung (yellow card) 60'	Stadium: Millerntor-Stadion; Attendance: 29,546; Referee: Sven Jablonski

22 September 2019 7	Hamburger SV	4–0	Erzgebirge Aue	Hamburg
13:30	Vagnoman 18'; Hinterseer 32'; Harnik 47'; Hunt 62'; van Drongelen (yellow card) 70'	Report	Daferner (yellow card) 37'; Fandrich (yellow card) 66'; Strauß (yellow card) 75'	Stadium: Volksparkstadion; Attendance: 44,021; Referee: Tobias Reichel

28 September 2019 8	Jahn Regensburg	2–2	Hamburger SV	Regensburg
13:00	Gimber (yellow card) 8'; George (yellow card) 13'; Stolze 29'; Correia (yellow card) 38'; Saller (yellow card) 76'; Albers 85'	Report	Nachreiner 72' (o.g.); Hunt 75'; Hinterseer (yellow card) 82'	Stadium: Continental Arena; Attendance: 15,210; Referee: Tobias Welz

5 October 2019 9	Hamburger SV	2–0	Greuther Fürth	Hamburg
13:00	Dudziak 49'; van Drongelen (yellow card) 60'; Kittel 85'	Report	Green (yellow card) 25'; Sarpei (yellow card) 59'	Stadium: Volksparkstadion; Attendance: 44,180; Referee: Florian Heft

21 October 2019 10	Arminia Bielefeld	1–1	Hamburger SV	Bielefeld
20:30	Klos 50' (yellow card) 53'; Brunner (yellow card) 89'	Report	Hinterseer 15'	Stadium: Bielefelder Alm; Attendance: 26,515; Referee: Frank Willenborg

26 October 2019 11	Hamburger SV	6–2	VfB Stuttgart	Hamburg
13:00	Kittel 13' (pen.), 36'; Jatta 24'; Castro 57' (o.g.); Vagnoman (yellow card) 74'; Harnik 76'; Fein 90+1'	Report	Gonzalez 33'; Kempf (yellow card) 49'; Silas 63'; Förster (yellow card) 66'	Stadium: Volksparkstadion; Attendance: 57,000; Referee: Deniz Aytekin

3 November 2019 12	Wehen Wiesbaden	1–1	Hamburger SV	Wiesbaden
13:30	Mrowca (yellow card) 31'; Aigner (red card) 57'; Knöll 90+1'	Report	Kinsombi 48'	Stadium: BRITA-Arena; Attendance: 9,100; Referee: René Rohde

9 November 2019 13	Holstein Kiel	1–1	Hamburger SV	Kiel
13:00	Neumann (yellow card) 32'; Serra 43'; Thesker (yellow card) 90'	Report	Jatta (red card) 26'; Jung (yellow card) 90'; Letschert 90+1'; Leibold (yellow card) 90+4'	Stadium: Holstein-Stadion; Attendance: 15,000; Referee: Christian Dingert

23 November 2019 14	Hamburger SV	2–1	Dynamo Dresden	Hamburg
13:00	Moritz (yellow card) 49'; Kittel 67'; Kinsombi 90+4'	Report	Kreuzer 47' (yellow card) 54'; Burnić (yellow card) 63'; Nikolaou (yellow card) 67'	Stadium: Volksparkstadion; Attendance: 51,586; Referee: Marco Fritz

29 November 2019 15	VfL Osnabrück	2–1	Hamburger SV	Osnabrück
18:30	Schmidt 37'; Blacha 45+2'; Álvarez (yellow card) 69'	Report	Leibold (yellow card) 62'; Kittel 64'	Stadium: Stadion an der Bremer Brücke; Attendance: 15,800; Referee: (Germany) Tobias Reichel

6 December 2019 16	Hamburger SV	0–1	FC Heidenheim	Hamburg
18:30		Report	Föhrenbach 82'	Stadium: Volksparkstadion; Attendance: 42,190; Referee: (Germany) Felix Brych

15 December 2019 17	SV Sandhausen	1–1	Hamburger SV	Sandhausen
13:30	Zhirov 39'; Halimi (yellow card) 60'	Report	Jatta (yellow card) 57'; Hinterseer 75'	Stadium: BWT-Stadion am Hardtwald; Attendance: 12,958; Referee: (Germany) Deniz Aytekin

21 December 2019 18	Darmstadt 98	2–2	Hamburger SV	Darmstadt
13:00	Dursun 32' 58'	Report	Hinterseer 18'; Jatta 45' (yellow card) 66'	Stadium: Merck-Stadion am Böllenfalltor; Attendance: 14,875; Referee: (Germany) Aarne Aarnink

30 January 2020 19	Hamburger SV	4–1	1. FC Nürnberg	Hamburg
20:30	Schaub (yellow card) 2'; Jatta 17'; van Drongelen (yellow card) 20'; Hinterseer 28' (pen.); Kittel 67' (pen.); Jung 82'	Report	Frey (yellow card) 20'; Čerin (yellow card) 41'; Behrens (yellow card) 49'; Handwerker 51'; Margreitter (yellow card) 66'	Stadium: Volksparkstadion; Attendance: 39,985; Referee: (Germany) Markus Schmidt

3 February 2020 20	VfL Bochum	1–3	Hamburger SV	Bochum
20:30	Gamboa (yellow card) 38'; Zoller 65'	Report	Hinterseer (yellow card) 62'; Leibold 68'; Pohjanpalo 73'; Kittel 87'	Stadium: Vonovia-Ruhrstadion; Attendance: 24,421; Referee: (Germany) Daniel Schlager

8 February 2020 21	Hamburger SV	2–0	Karlsruher SC	Hamburg
13:00	Beyer (yellow card) 51'; Hinterseer 67' 81'	Report	Hofmann (yellow card) 43'	Stadium: Volksparkstadion; Attendance: 49,581; Referee: (Germany) Bastian Dankert

15 February 2020 22	Hannover 96	1–1	Hamburger SV	Hanover
13:00	Anton (yellow card) 30'; Kaiser (yellow card) 30'; Teuchert (yellow card) 39' (goal) 51'; Albornoz (yellow card) 83'	Report	Pohjanpalo 90+6'	Stadium: HDI-Arena; Attendance: 49,000; Referee: (Germany) Matthias Jöllenbeck

22 February 2020 23	Hamburger SV	0–2	FC St. Pauli	Hamburg
13:00		Report	Diamantakos (yellow card) 12'; Veerman 20' (yellow card) 64'; Penney 29'; Ohlsson (yellow card) 62'; Buballa (yellow card) 82'	Stadium: Volksparkstadion; Attendance: 57,000; Referee: (Germany) Manuel Gräfe

29 February 2020 24	Erzgebirge Aue	3–0	Hamburger SV	Aue
13:00	Baumgart (yellow card) 16'; Testroet 39'; Männel (yellow card) 59'; Hochscheidt 74' 88'	Report	Hunt (yellow card) 38'; Jung (yellow card) 45' (yellow-red card) 58'; Beyer (yellow card) 56'; van Drongelen (yellow card) 75'	Stadium: Erzgebirgsstadion; Attendance: 15,100; Referee: (Germany) Nicolas Winter

7 March 2020 25	Hamburger SV	2–1	Jahn Regensburg	Hamburg
13:00	Letschert 24'; Jatta (yellow card) 39'; Hunt 50'; Daniel Heuer (yellow card) 67'; Moritz (yellow card) 70'	Report	Okoroji (yellow card) 22'; Grüttner 40' (yellow card) 71'; Wekesser (yellow card) 66'; Saller (yellow card) 90+3'	Stadium: Volksparkstadion; Attendance: 41,317; Referee: (Germany) Aarne Aarnink

17 May 2020 26	Greuther Fürth	2–2	Hamburger SV	Fürth
13:00	Nielsen 35', 90+4'; Seguin (yellow card) 74'; Leweling (yellow card) 82'	Report	Samperio (yellow card) 21'; Beyer (yellow card) 26'; Pohjanpalo 41'; Dudziak 48'; Letschert (yellow card) 64'	Stadium: Sportpark Ronhof Thomas Sommer; Attendance: 0 (Note: Match played behind closed doors)

24 May 2020 27	Hamburger SV	0–0	Arminia Bielefeld	Hamburg
				Stadium: Volksparkstadion; Attendance: 0

28 May 2020 28	VfB Stuttgart	3–2	Hamburger SV	Stuttgart
20:30 CEST	Badstuber (yellow card) 45'; Endo 47'; González 60' (pen.); Förster (yellow card) 80'; Castro 90+2'	Report	Pohjanpalo 16'; Hunt 45+2' (pen.) (yellow card) 88'; Vagnoman (yellow card) 78'	Stadium: Mercedes-Benz Arena; Attendance: 0 Referee: Christian Dingert

31 May 2020 29	Hamburger SV	3–2	Wehen Wiesbaden	Hamburg
TBD	Kinsombi 14' 76'; Pohjanpalo 27'		Schäffler 12' 57' (pen.)	Stadium: Volksparkstadion; Attendance: 0

8 June 2020 30	Hamburger SV	3–3	Holstein Kiel	Hamburg
TBD	Pohjanpalo 23' 67'; Aaron Hunt 21' (pen.)		Mühling 9'; Iyoha 9'; Jae-Sung 90+3'	Stadium: Volksparkstadion; Attendance: 0

12 June 2020 31	Dynamo Dresden	0–1	Hamburger SV	Dresden
TBD				Stadium: Rudolf-Harbig-Stadion; Attendance: 0

16 June 2020 32	Hamburger SV	1–1	VfL Osnabrück	Hamburg
TBD				Stadium: Volksparkstadion; Attendance: 0

21 June 2020 33	1. FC Heidenheim	2–1	Hamburger SV	Heidenheim
15:30				Stadium: Voith-Arena; Attendance: 0

28 June 2020 34	Hamburger SV	1–5	SV Sandhausen	Hamburg
15:30				Stadium: Volksparkstadion; Attendance: 0

=== DFB-Pokal ===
11 August 2019 First round	Chemnitzer FC	2–2 (a.e.t.) (5–6 p)	Hamburger SV	Chemnitz
18:30	Božić 57' (pen.); Langer 68'	Report	Hinterseer 62'; Kittel 75'	Stadium: Stadion an der Gellertstraße; Attendance: 13,130; Referee: Robert Kampka
	Penalties
	Müller (penalty scored); Sarmov (penalty scored); Bonga (penalty scored); Schoppenhauer (penalty missed); Tallig (penalty scored); Itter (penalty scored); Reddemann (penalty missed)		(penalty scored) Kittel; (penalty scored) Hinterseer; (penalty missed) Narey; (penalty scored) Wintzheimer; (penalty scored) Jairo; (penalty scored) Van Drongelen; (penalty scored) Fein

29 October 2019 Second round	Hamburger SV	1–2 (a.e.t.)	Stuttgart	Hamburg
18:30	Hunt 16' (pen.)	Report	González 2' (pen.); Al Ghaddioui 113'	Stadium: Volksparkstadion; Attendance: 45,503; Referee: Bastian Dankert

== Statistics ==
=== Appearances and goals ===
As of 17 August 2019

No.	Pos.	Nat.	Name	2. Bundesliga	DFB-Pokal	Total
