= Florian Krüger =

German footballer

Personal information
- Date of birth: 13 February 1999 (age 27)
- Place of birth: Staßfurt, Germany
- Height: 1.86 m (6 ft 1 in)
- Position: Centre-forward

Team information
- Current team: MSV Duisburg
- Number: 26

Youth career
- 2003–2011: SV 09 Staßfurt
- 2011–2015: 1. FC Magdeburg
- 2015–2018: Schalke 04

Senior career*
Years	Team	Apps	(Gls)
2018–2021	Erzgebirge Aue	82	(20)
2021–2022	Arminia Bielefeld	31	(1)
2022–2024	Groningen	22	(4)
2023–2024	→ Eintracht Braunschweig (loan)	22	(2)
2024–2025	Beerschot	6	(0)
2025	→ 1. FC Saarbrücken (loan)	15	(7)
2025–	MSV Duisburg	39	(6)

International career
2014–2015	Germany U16	5	(3)
2015	Germany U17	3	(1)
2016	Germany U18	4	(1)
2020–2021	Germany U21	6	(1)
- * Club domestic league appearances and goals as of 17:43, 7 November 2026 (UTC)

Florian Krüger (born 13 February 1999) is a German professional footballer who plays as a centre-forward for German 3. Liga club MSV Duisburg.

== Career ==
=== Erzgebirge Aue ===
Born in Staßfurt, Krüger made his professional debut for Erzgebirge Aue in the 2. Bundesliga on 24 November 2018, starting in the away match against VfL Bochum. He assisted Pascal Testroet in the 2nd minute for Aue's opening goal, with the match finishing as a 2–1 loss. On 5 November 2020, his contract was extended until 30 June 2023.

=== Arminia Bielefeld ===
On 23 June 2021, Krüger signed for Bundesliga side Arminia Bielefeld on a four-year contract for a fee of €1 million.

=== Groningen ===
On 30 August 2022, Krüger signed a four-year contract with Groningen in the Netherlands.

=== Eintracht Braunschweig ===
On 29 August 2023, Krüger signed for 2. Bundesliga club Eintracht Braunschweig on a season-long loan deal with the option to buy.

=== Beerschot ===
On 6 September 2024, Krüger moved to Beerschot in Belgium. On 3 February 2025, he returned to Germany and joined 3. Liga club 1. FC Saarbrücken on loan.

=== MSV Duisburg ===
In September 2025, he moved to MSV Duisburg.

== Career statistics ==
As of 7 November 2026

Appearances and goals by club, season and competition
Club	Season	League			National cup		Other		Total	
Club	Season	Division	Apps	Goals	Apps	Goals	Apps	Goals	Apps	Goals
Erzgebirge Aue	2018–19	2. Bundesliga	16	2	0	0	0	0	16	2
Erzgebirge Aue	2019–20	2. Bundesliga	32	7	2	1	0	0	34	8
Erzgebirge Aue	2020–21	2. Bundesliga	34	11	1	0	0	0	35	11
Erzgebirge Aue	Total		82	20	3	1	0	0	85	21
Arminia Bielefeld	2021–22	Bundesliga	27	1	2	0	0	0	29	1
Arminia Bielefeld	2022–23	2. Bundesliga	4	0	1	0	0	0	5	0
Arminia Bielefeld	Total		31	1	3	0	0	0	34	1
Groningen	2022–23	Eredivisie	22	4	1	0	0	0	23	4
Eintracht Braunschweig (loan)	2023–24	2. Bundesliga	22	2	0	0	0	0	22	2
Beerschot	2024–25	Belgian Pro League	6	0	1	0	0	0	7	0
1. FC Saarbrücken (loan)	2024–25	2. Bundesliga	15	7	0	0	2 (Note: Appearances in relegation play-offs)	1	16	8
MSV Duisburg	2025–26	3. Liga	29	3	—		—		29	3
MSV Duisburg	2026–27	3. Liga	10	3	1	0	—		11	3
MSV Duisburg	Total		39	6	1	0	—		40	6
Career total			217	40	9	1	2	0	228	41
