= Fabian Kalig =

German footballer

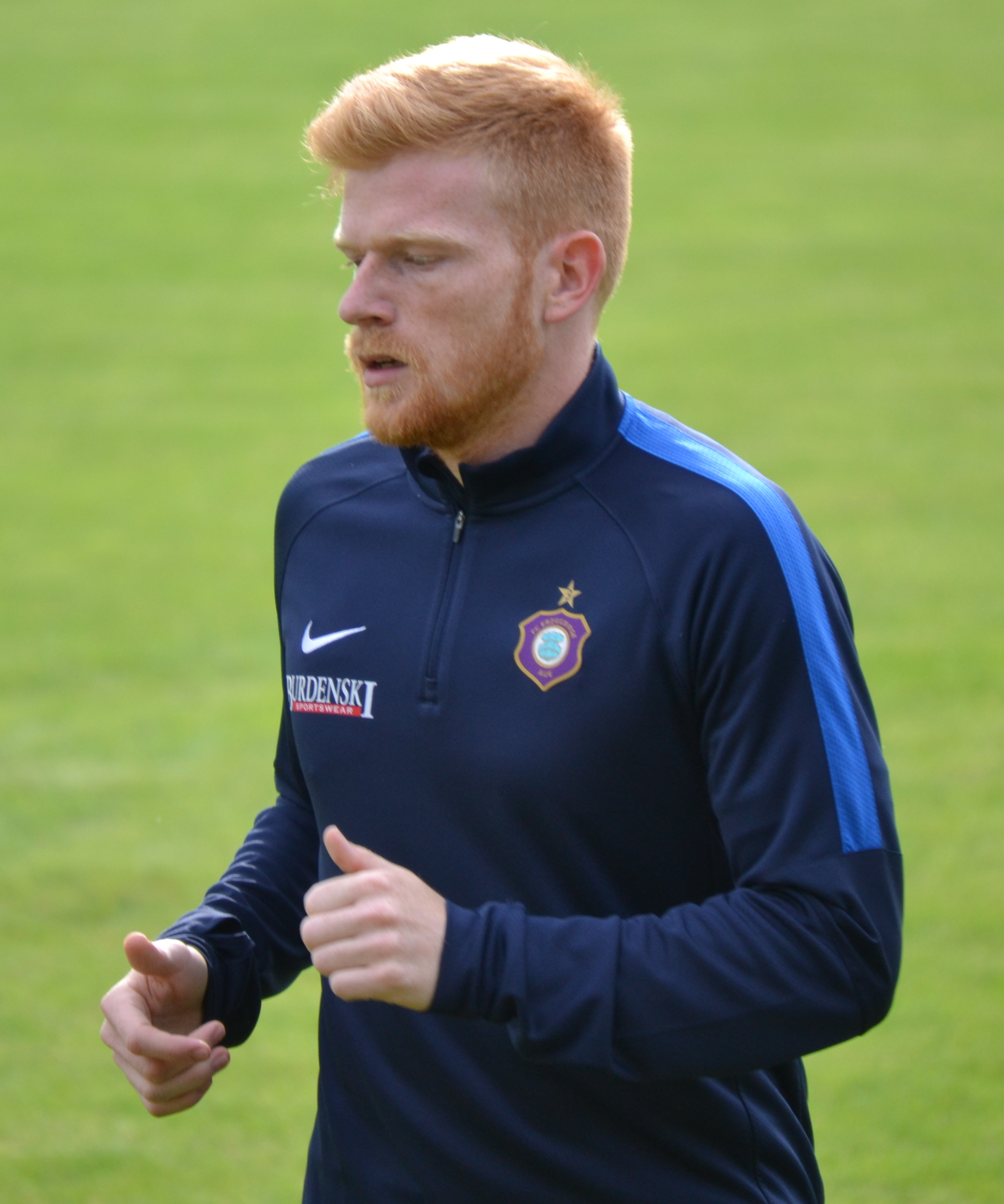
- Kalig in 2016

Personal information
- Full name: Fabian Kalig
- Date of birth: 28 March 1993 (age 33)
- Place of birth: Wiesbaden, Germany
- Height: 1.80 m (5 ft 11 in)
- Position: Defender

Youth career
- –2007: SV Niedernhausen
- 2007–2012: Mainz 05

Senior career*
Years	Team	Apps	(Gls)
2012–2016	Mainz 05 II	126	(7)
2016–2021	Erzgebirge Aue	85	(1)
Total		211	(8)
- * Club domestic league appearances and goals

Fabian Kalig (born 28 March 1993) is a German former professional footballer who played as a defender.

== Career ==
Born in Wiesbaden, Kalig played for SV Niedernhausen and 1. FSV Mainz 05 II before, on 13 June 2016, he signed for Erzgebirge Aue on a two-year contract. In May 2018, he extended his contract with Aue until the end of June 2021.

Kalig announced his retirement from playing at the age of 28 in September 2021 due to cartilage damage.

== Career statistics ==
Appearances and goals by club, season and competition
Club	Season	League			DFB-Pokal		Other		Total	
Club	Season	Division	Apps	Goals	Apps	Goals	Apps	Goals	Apps	Goals
Mainz 05 II	2012–13	Regionalliga Südwest	34	1	—		0	0	34	1
Mainz 05 II	2013–14	Regionalliga Südwest	23	3	—		2 (Note: Appearance(s) in play-offs for 3. Liga)	0	25	3
Mainz 05 II	2014–15	3. Liga	33	1	—		0	0	33	1
Mainz 05 II	2015–16	3. Liga	36	2	—		0	0	36	2
Mainz 05 II	Total		126	7	—		2	0	128	7
Erzgebirge Aue	2016–17	2. Bundesliga	18	1	0	0	0	0	18	1
Erzgebirge Aue	2017–18	2. Bundesliga	31	0	1	0	2 (Note: Appearance(s) in play-offs for 2. Bundesliga)	0	34	0
Erzgebirge Aue	2018–19	2. Bundesliga	27	0	1	0	0	0	28	0
Erzgebirge Aue	2019–20	2. Bundesliga	9	0	1	0	0	0	10	0
Erzgebirge Aue	2020–21	2. Bundesliga	0	0	0	0	0	0	0	0
Erzgebirge Aue	Total		85	1	3	0	2	0	90	1
Career total			211	8	3	0	4	0	218	8
