= Martin Männel =

German footballer (born 1988)

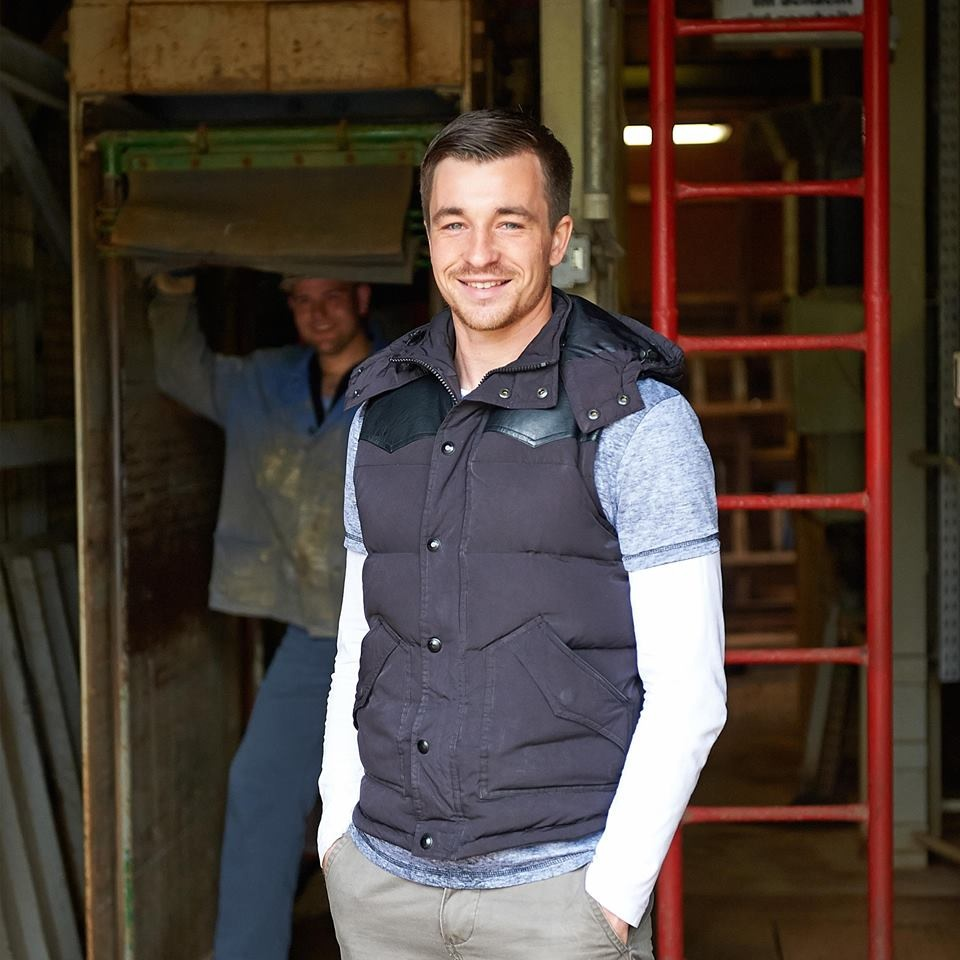
- Männel in 2014

Personal information
- Date of birth: 16 March 1988 (age 38)
- Place of birth: Hennigsdorf, East Germany
- Height: 1.84 m (6 ft 0 in)
- Position: Goalkeeper

Team information
- Current team: Erzgebirge Aue
- Number: 1

Youth career
- 1996–1998: FSV Velten
- 1998–2001: SC Oberhavel Velten
- 2001–2005: Energie Cottbus

Senior career*
Years	Team	Apps	(Gls)
2005–2008	Energie Cottbus II	34	(0)
2008–	Erzgebirge Aue	569	(1)

International career
2003–2004	Germany U16	4	(0)
2004–2005	Germany U17	4	(0)
2005–2006	Germany U18	5	(0)
2006–2007	Germany U19	11	(0)
2007–2008	Germany U20	6	(0)
- * Club domestic league appearances and goals as of 23 September 2026

Martin Männel (born 16 March 1988) is a German professional footballer, who plays for and captains club Erzgebirge Aue as a goalkeeper. Since his arrival in 2008, Männel has been spending his career with the Veilchen side.

On 24 May 2015, he gained notoriety after scoring a goal against 1. FC Heidenheim that tied the match on the final score of 2–2.

== Club career ==
Männel began his football career at the age of eight at FSV Velten and, later on, SC Oberhavel Velten. At the age of 14, he moved to Energie Cottbus, where he attended the so-called "Elite School of Football", the Lausitzer Sports Academy. Männel progressed through all the youth departments and, in 2005, became the starting goalkeeper of Cottbus' reserve team when he was just 17 years old.

For the 2008–09 season, he signed a two-year contract with Erzgebirge Aue, being involved in the same operation that also brought his teammates Arne Feick, Jan Hochscheidt and Marc Hensel to Saxony. Thanks to some impressive performances, he quickly replaced Stephan Flauder as the club's main goalkeeper, and he achieved his biggest sporting success early on by winning the promotion to the 2. Bundesliga with Erzgebirge at the end of the 2009–10 season. During the same year, Männel signed a contract extension with the club until 2012. The first appearance in the second tier for both the goalkeeper and Erzgebirge turned out to beat pretty successful: in fact, while at the winter break the newly promoted team surprisingly topped the league table, at the end of the season they finished in fifth place.

At the beginning of the 2013–14 season, Männel initially lost his starting place in goal to newly arrived Sascha Kirschstein, but managed to regain it during the second half of the league. In February 2014, he extended his contract with Aue until June 2016.

On 24 May 2015, while his side was involved in a relegation battle, Männel scored a header from a corner kick in the 88th minute of a match against 1. FC Heidenheim, thus establishing the final score of 2–2. Despite their efforts, the club still suffered relegation to the 3. Liga: however, after only one year down, the club returned to the 2. Bundesliga in 2016.

During the 2019–20 and 2020–21 seasons, Männel gained some fame as a frequent "penalty blocker": in fact, he saved 7 out of the 12 penalties he has faced combinely. These statistics include a last-minute save of Michael Frey's attempt to secure Erzgebirge a 4–3 win against 1. FC Nürnberg, on 18 October 2019, and the two saves he performed (Denis Thomalla and Christian Kühlwetter being the respective penalty takers) in a 2–0 loss against 1. FC Heidenheim, on 13 February 2021.

== International career ==
Männel was a youth international for Germany. During his time at Energie Cottbus, he was called-up to the under-19 national team for the first time. On 21 July 2007, he suffered a hearing trauma while he was playing in a game against Serbia U19, as an explosive device blasted right next to his goal.

== Personal life ==
Martin Männel is married to the television reporter Doreen Männel, who has worked as an editor at MDR Fernsehen. They have two sons, born in 2012 and 2018.

== Career statistics ==
As of match played 8 November 2022

Appearances and goals by club, season and competition
Club	Season	League			DFB-Pokal		Other		Total	
Club	Season	Division	Apps	Goals	Apps	Goals	Apps	Goals	Apps	Goals
Energie Cottbus II	2007–08	Regionalliga Nord	34	0	–		0	0	34	0
Erzgebirge Aue	2008–09	3. Liga	29	0	–		0	0	29	0
Erzgebirge Aue	2009–10	3. Liga	37	0	–		0	0	37	0
Erzgebirge Aue	2010–11	2. Bundesliga	33	0	1	0	0	0	34	0
Erzgebirge Aue	2011–12	2. Bundesliga	34	0	2	0	0	0	36	0
Erzgebirge Aue	2012–13	2. Bundesliga	32	0	2	0	0	0	34	0
Erzgebirge Aue	2013–14	2. Bundesliga	22	0	0	0	0	0	22	0
Erzgebirge Aue	2014–15	2. Bundesliga	33	1	2	0	0	0	35	1
Erzgebirge Aue	2015–16	3. Liga	37	0	3	0	0	0	40	0
Erzgebirge Aue	2016–17	2. Bundesliga	24	0	1	0	0	0	25	0
Erzgebirge Aue	2017–18	2. Bundesliga	34	0	1	0	2 (Note: Appearances in 2. Bundesliga relegation play-offs)	0	37	0
Erzgebirge Aue	2018–19	2. Bundesliga	30	0	1	0	0	0	31	0
Erzgebirge Aue	2019–20	2. Bundesliga	30	0	2	0	0	0	32	0
Erzgebirge Aue	2020–21	2. Bundesliga	33	0	1	0	0	0	34	0
Erzgebirge Aue	2021–22	2. Bundesliga	27	0	1	0	0	0	28	0
Erzgebirge Aue	2022–23	3. Liga	7	0	0	0	0	0	7	0
Erzgebirge Aue	Total		442	1	17	0	2	0	461	1
Career total			476	1	17	0	2	0	495	1
