= Stephan Flauder =

German footballer

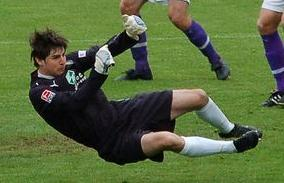
- Flauder with Erzgebirge Aue in 2008

Personal information
- Date of birth: 30 May 1986 (age 40)
- Place of birth: Frankfurt (Oder), East Germany
- Height: 1.97 m (6 ft 6 in)
- Position: Goalkeeper

Youth career
- 1993–2005: Frankfurter FC Viktoria

Senior career*
Years	Team	Apps	(Gls)
2005–2012	Erzgebirge Aue II	64	(0)
2008–2013	Erzgebirge Aue	14	(0)
2013–2015	BFC Dynamo	50	(0)
2015–2017	Berliner AK 07	35	(0)
2017–2018	Tennis Borussia Berlin	30	(0)
2018–2020	Viktoria Berlin	55	(0)
2020–2022	Kickers Offenbach	66	(0)
- * Club domestic league appearances and goals as of 14 May 2022

Stephan Flauder (born 30 May 1986) is a German footballer who plays as a goalkeeper.

== Career ==
Flauder began his career with Erzgebirge Aue and was promoted to the first team in 2008, making his debut on the last day of the 2007–08 season in a 1–1 draw with 1860 Munich with Aue already relegated from the 2. Bundesliga. Since then he has served as understudy to Martin Männel, as the club returned to the second tier in 2010.

He left Aue in 2013 to sign for BFC Dynamo. In his first season with BFC, coached by Volkan Uluc, he played the DFB-Pokal match against VfB Stuttgart, narrowly lost 2–0 in Friedrich-Ludwig-Jahn-Sportpark and secured the wine-reds' promotion to Regionalliga in 2014.
