= Malcolm Cacutalua =

German footballer

Personal information
- Date of birth: 15 November 1994 (age 31)
- Place of birth: Troisdorf, Germany
- Height: 1.88 m (6 ft 2 in)
- Position: Defender

Youth career
- –2009: 1. FC Köln
- 2009–2010: Sportfreunde Troisdorf
- 2010–2011: SV Bergisch Gladbach 09
- 2011–2013: Bayer Leverkusen

Senior career*
Years	Team	Apps	(Gls)
2013–2014	Bayer Leverkusen II	31	(1)
2013–2016	Bayer Leverkusen	0	(0)
2014	→ Greuther Fürth (loan)	0	(0)
2014	→ Greuther Fürth II (loan)	1	(0)
2014–2016	→ VfL Bochum (loan)	32	(0)
2016–2017	Arminia Bielefeld	12	(1)
2017–2022	Erzgebirge Aue	71	(5)
2022–2024	Magdeburg	5	(0)
2024	Panevėžys	18	(0)

International career^{‡}
2013–2014	Germany U20	12	(1)
2015	Germany U21	1	(0)
- * Club domestic league appearances and goals as of 13 September 2024 ‡ National team caps and goals as of 1 July 2017

Malcolm Cacutalua (born 15 November 1994) is a German professional footballer who plays as a defender for lithuanian Panevėžys Club.

Cacutalua was born in Germany and born to an Angolan father and German mother. He has been a German youth international.

== Club career ==
On 3 June 2022, Cacutalua signed with Magdeburg.

On 14 March 2024, he signed with lithuanian Panevėžys Club, but left the club in September 2024.

== International career ==
=== Career statistics ===
As of match played 25 September 2020

Appearances and goals by club, season and competition
Club	Season	League			Cup		Other		Total	
Club	Season	Division	Apps	Goals	Apps	Goals	Apps	Goals	Apps	Goals
Bayer Leverkusen II	2012–13	Regionalliga West	1	0	—		0	0	1	0
Bayer Leverkusen II	2013–14	Regionalliga West	30	1	—		0	0	30	1
Bayer Leverkusen II	Total		31	1	0	0	0	0	31	1
Greuther Fürth II	2014–15	Regionalliga Bayern	1	0	—		0	0	1	0
Greuther Fürth	2014–15	2. Bundesliga	0	0	1	0	0	0	1	0
VfL Bochum	2014–15	2. Bundesliga	21	0	1	0	0	0	22	0
VfL Bochum	2015–16	2. Bundesliga	11	0	1	0	0	0	12	0
VfL Bochum	Total		32	0	2	0	0	0	34	0
Arminia Bielefeld	2016–17	2. Bundesliga	12	1	2	0	0	0	14	1
Erzgebirge Aue	2017–18	2. Bundesliga	25	3	0	0	2 (Note: Appearance(s) in 2. Bundesliga relegation play-offs)	0	27	3
Erzgebirge Aue	2018–19	2. Bundesliga	17	0	0	0	0	0	17	0
Erzgebirge Aue	2019–20	2. Bundesliga	9	1	0	0	0	0	9	1
Erzgebirge Aue	2020–21	2. Bundesliga	2	0	0	0	0	0	2	0
Erzgebirge Aue	Total		53	4	0	0	2	0	55	4
Career total			129	6	5	0	2	0	136	6
