= Hikmet Çiftçi =

Turkish footballer

Personal information
- Date of birth: 10 March 1998 (age 28)
- Place of birth: Neuss, Germany
- Height: 1.77 m (5 ft 10 in)
- Position: Midfielder

Team information
- Current team: Vanspor
- Number: 19

Youth career
- 2004–2006: Vatan Neuss
- 2006–2017: 1. FC Köln

Senior career*
Years	Team	Apps	(Gls)
2017–2019	1. FC Köln II	66	(6)
2019–2020	Erzgebirge Aue	1	(0)
2020–2023	1. FC Kaiserslautern	69	(2)
2023	→ Göztepe (loan)	12	(0)
2023–2024	Tuzlaspor	28	(1)
2024–2026	Bandırmaspor	61	(2)
2026–	Vanspor	6	(0)

International career^{‡}
2017	Turkey U19	1	(0)
2018–2019	Turkey U21	3	(0)
- * Club domestic league appearances and goals as of 18 October 2026 ‡ National team caps and goals as of 22 January 2020

Hikmet Çiftçi (born 10 March 1998) is a Turkish professional footballer who plays as a midfielder for TFF 1. Lig club Vanspor.

== Career ==
On 11 June 2019, Çiftçi signed his first professional contract with Erzgebirge Aue. He made his professional debut with Erzgebirge Aue in a 3–1 2. Bundesliga loss to Arminia Bielefeld on 17 August 2019.

On 8 January 2020, Çiftçi transferred to 1. FC Kaiserslautern.

On 20 January 2023, he was loaned to Göztepe until the end of the season.

On 22 August 2023, his contract with Kaiserslautern was terminated by mutual consent.
