= Filip Kusić =

Serbian footballer (born 1996)

Personal information
- Date of birth: 3 June 1996 (age 30)
- Place of birth: Munich, Germany
- Height: 1.87 m (6 ft 2 in)
- Position: Centre-back

Team information
- Current team: 1. FC Lokomotive Leipzig
- Number: 36

Youth career
- –2013: Mainz 05
- 2013–2014: Energie Cottbus

Senior career*
Years	Team	Apps	(Gls)
2014–2015	Energie Cottbus II	24	(0)
2015–2016	FC Oberlausitz Neugersdorf	31	(5)
2016	FC Oberlausitz Neugersdorf II	1	(0)
2016–2018	1. FC Köln II	60	(3)
2017–2018	1. FC Köln	1	(0)
2018–2020	Erzgebirge Aue	20	(0)
2020–2022	Türkgücü München	48	(0)
2022–2023	FSV Zwickau	12	(0)
2024–2025	Energie Cottbus	39	(0)
2026–	1. FC Lokomotive Leipzig	20	(2)

International career
2014	Serbia U19	3	(0)
- * Club domestic league appearances and goals as of 23 September 2026

Filip Kusić (Serbian Cyrillic: Филип Кусић; born 3 June 1996) is a professional footballer who plays as a centre-back for 1. FC Lokomotive Leipzig. Born in Germany, he represented Serbia internationally as a junior.
