= Paul Horschig =

German footballer

Personal information
- Date of birth: 1 March 2000 (age 26)
- Place of birth: Germany
- Height: 1.91 m (6 ft 3 in)
- Position: Defensive midfielder

Team information
- Current team: Chemie Leipzig
- Number: 39

Youth career
- –2017: Borea Dresden
- 2017–2019: Erzgebirge Aue

Senior career*
Years	Team	Apps	(Gls)
2019–2020	Erzgebirge Aue	1	(0)
2019–2020	→ VfB Auerbach (loan)	15	(1)
2020–2021	VfB Auerbach	9	(0)
2021–	Chemie Leipzig	103	(3)
- * Club domestic league appearances and goals as of 1 January 2025

Paul Horschig (born 1 March 2000) is a German footballer who plays as a defensive midfielder for Chemie Leipzig.

== Career ==
Horschig made his professional debut for Erzgebirge Aue in the 2. Bundesliga on 19 May 2019, coming on as a substitute in the 84th minute for Clemens Fandrich in the away match against Darmstadt 98, which finished as a 0–1 loss. In August 2019, he joined VfB Auerbach in the Regionalliga Nordost for the 2019–20 season.
