= Tom Baumgart =

German footballer (born 1997)

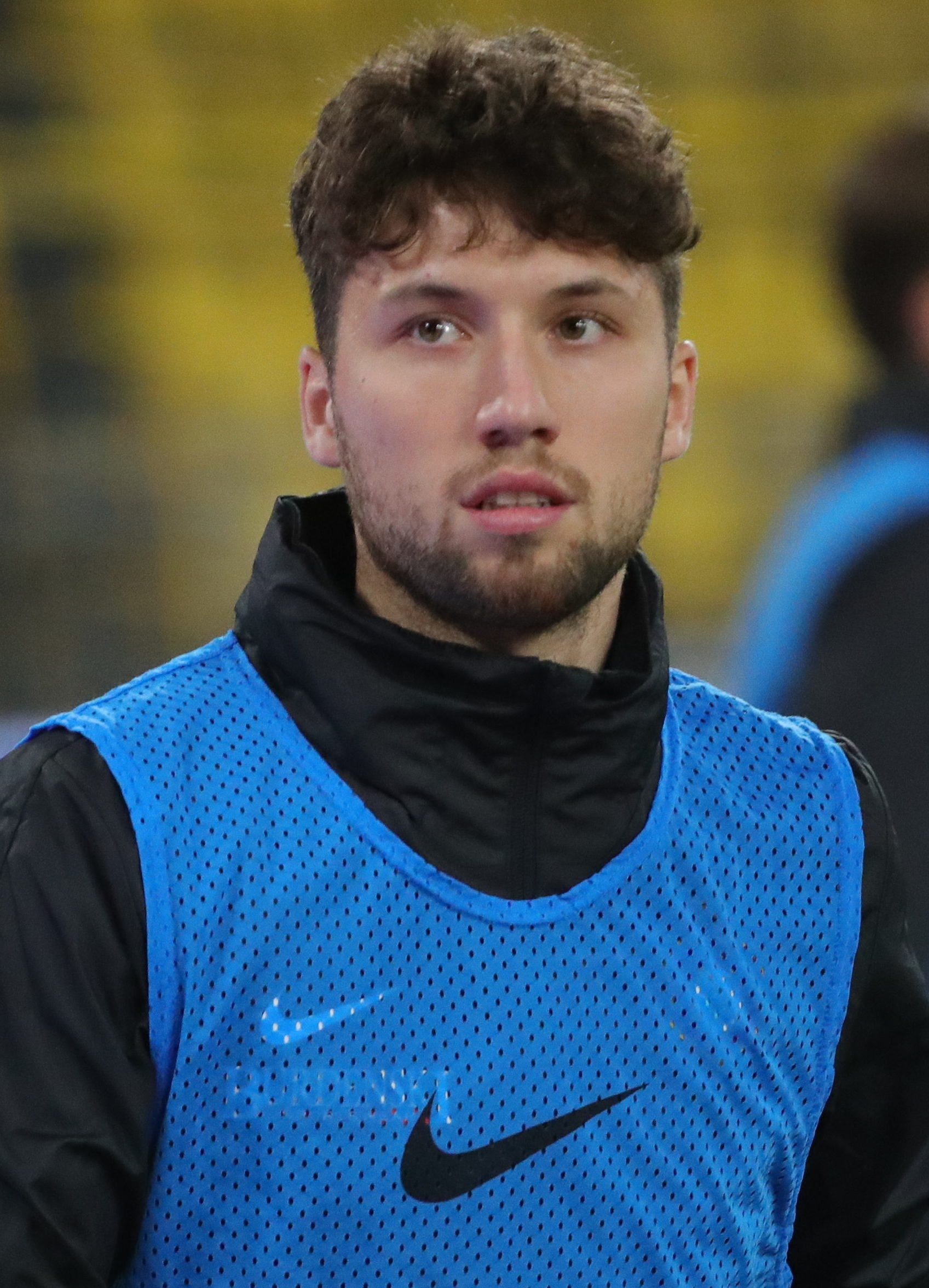
- Baumgart in 2022

Personal information
- Date of birth: 12 November 1997 (age 28)
- Place of birth: Freiberg, Germany
- Height: 1.82 m (6 ft 0 in)
- Position: Forward

Team information
- Current team: Chemnitzer FC
- Number: 29

Youth career
- SV Mulda
- –2016: Chemnitzer FC

Senior career*
Years	Team	Apps	(Gls)
2016–2018	Chemnitzer FC	56	(10)
2018–2023	Erzgebirge Aue	80	(5)
2023–2024	Hallescher FC	23	(2)
2024–	Chemnitzer FC	54	(10)
- * Club domestic league appearances and goals as of 22 June 2026

Tom Baumgart (born 12 November 1997) is a German professional footballer who plays as a forward for Chemnitzer FC.

== Career ==
Born in Freiberg, Baumgart played for SV Mulda and Chemnitzer FC before, in June 2018, Baumgart signed for Erzgebirge Aue. In November 2019, Baumgart extended his contract with Erzgebirge Aue by a further two years.

On 8 June 2023, Baumgart agreed to join Hallescher FC.

== Career statistics ==
As of match played 11 November 2022

Appearances and goals by club, season and competition
Club	Season	League			National cup		Other		Total	
Club	Season	Division	Apps	Goals	Apps	Goals	Apps	Goals	Apps	Goals
Chemnitzer FC	2015–16	3. Liga	13	1	0	0	0	0	13	1
Chemnitzer FC	2016–17	3. Liga	16	3	—		0	0	16	3
Chemnitzer FC	2017–18	3. Liga	27	6	0	0	0	0	27	6
Chemnitzer FC	Total		56	10	0	0	0	0	56	10
Erzgebirge Aue	2018–19	2. Bundesliga	9	0	0	0	0	0	9	0
Erzgebirge Aue	2019–20	2. Bundesliga	24	2	1	1	0	0	25	3
Erzgebirge Aue	2020–21	2. Bundesliga	15	1	1	0	0	0	16	1
Erzgebirge Aue	2021–22	2. Bundesliga	17	0	0	0	0	0	17	0
Erzgebirge Aue	2022–23	3. Liga	10	2	0	0	0	0	10	2
Erzgebirge Aue	Total		75	5	2	1	0	0	77	6
Career total			131	15	2	1	0	0	133	16
