= Dennis Kempe =

German footballer (born 1986)

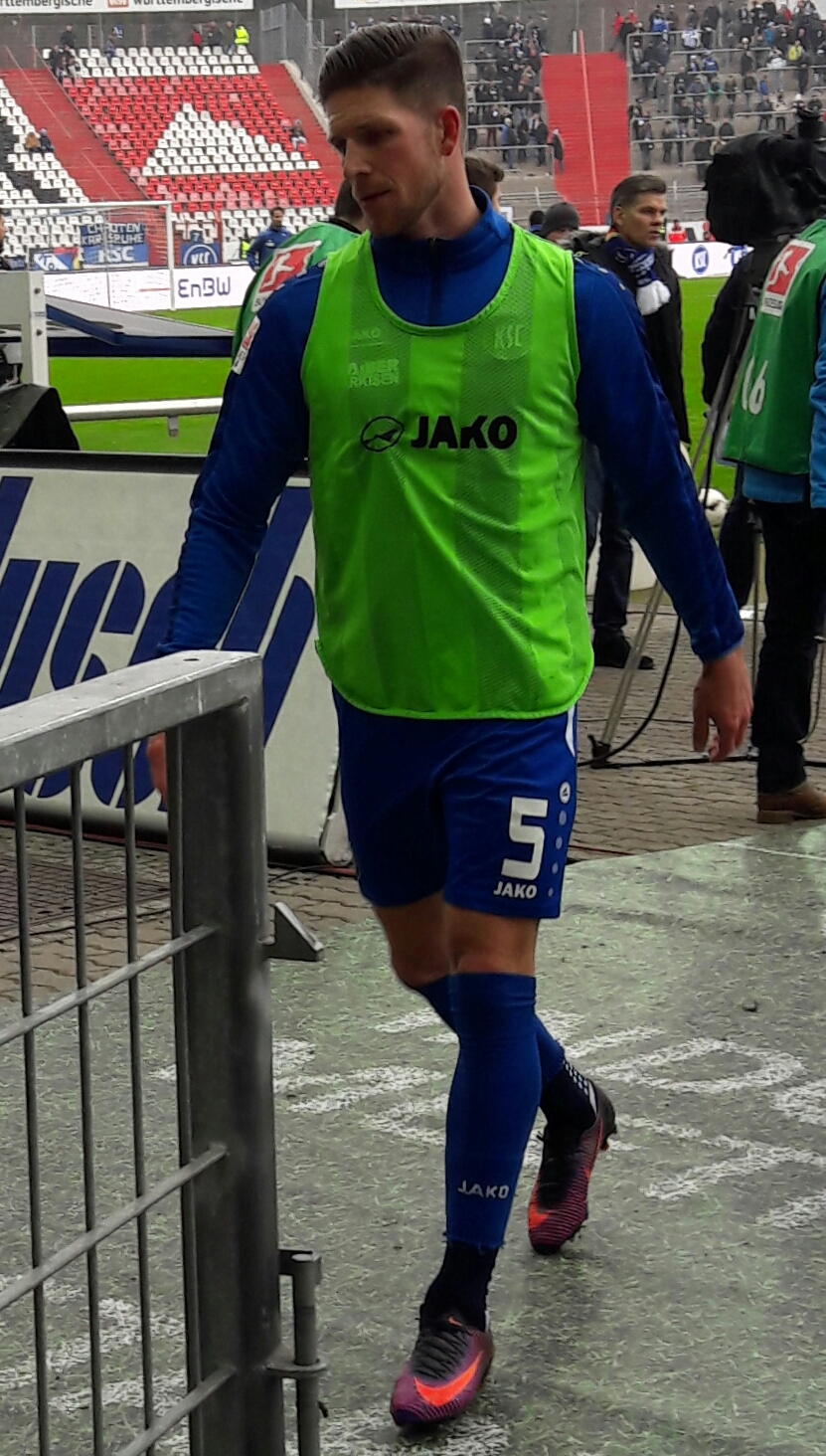
- Kempe in 2016

Personal information
- Date of birth: 24 June 1986 (age 40)
- Place of birth: Wesel, West Germany
- Height: 1.87 m (6 ft 2 in)
- Position: Defender

Youth career
- –1999: TV Voerde
- 1999–2002: SuS Dinslaken
- 2002–2006: Borussia Mönchengladbach

Senior career*
Years	Team	Apps	(Gls)
2006–2007	Borussia Mönchengladbach II	7	(0)
2007–2008	VfL Wolfsburg II	11	(0)
2008–2009	1. FC Kleve	28	(0)
2009–2010	FC Vaduz	12	(0)
2010–2011	VfR Aalen	28	(0)
2011–2017	Karlsruher SC	114	(6)
2017–2020	Erzgebirge Aue	63	(2)
2020–2023	Wehen Wiesbaden	55	(3)
Total		318	(11)

International career
2001	Germany U16	1	(0)
2005	Germany U19	4	(0)
- * Club domestic league appearances and goals

Dennis Kempe (born 24 June 1986) is a German former professional footballer who played as a defender for Borussia Mönchengladbach II, VfL Wolfsburg II, 1. FC Kleve, FC Vaduz, VfR Aalen, Karlsruher SC, Erzgebirge Aue and Wehen Wiesbaden.

== Club career ==
=== Early career ===
Born in Wesel, Kempe played youth football with TV Voerde and SuS Dinslaken before joining the academy of Borussia Mönchengladbach in 2002. Having made his senior debut for Borussia Mönchengladbach II in August 2006, Kempe played for VfL Wolfsburg II and 1. FC Kleve before signing for Liechtenstein based Swiss Challenge League club FC Vaduz in the summer of 2009. After making 12 league appearances across the 2009–10 season for Vaduz, Kempe joined 3. Liga club VfR Aalen on 2 September 2010 on a one-year contract.

=== Karlsruher SC ===
In the summer of 2011, Kempe joined Karlsruher SC on a one-year contract, with him making his debut for the club on 17 July 2011 in a 3–2 win at home to MSV Duisburg, He was a regular player for Karlsruhe during the first half of the season, but as a result of influenza, did not appear for the club during the second half of the season. Despite this, at the end of the 2011–12 season, following Karlsruhe's relegation to the 3. Liga, Kempe signed a new two-year contract with the club, lasting until 30 June 2014.

The 2012–13 season saw Kempe make 23 appearances in the 3. Liga, scoring thrice, as the club were promoted back to the 2. Bundesliga. On 18 September 2013, Kempe signed a two-year contract extension with Karlsruhe, keeping him at the club until 2016. Kempe remained a fairly regular player at Karlsruhe, though he often suffered from injuries that limited his playing time.

In April 2016, he extended his contract with Karlsruhe by a further two years. Across the 2016–17 season, he made 21 appearances for the club in the 2. Bundesliga as they were relegated back to the 3. Liga.

=== Erzgebirge Aue ===
He joined 2. Bundesliga side Erzgebirge Aue on a two-year contract in the summer of 2017, despite still having a year remaining on his contract at Karlsruhe. Over the course of the 2017–18 season, he made 25 appearances in the 2. Bundesliga, scoring once, whilst he made 17 appearances over the 2018–19 season, scoring once. In May 2019, his contract was extended by a further year to the summer of 2020. He was released at the end of the 2019–20 season.

=== Wehen Wiesbaden ===
In August 2020, Kempe joined newly relegated 3. Liga side Wehen Wiesbaden on a one-year contract. He retired at the end of the 2022–23 season during which Wehen Wiesbaden achieved promotion to the 2. Bundesliga.

== International career ==
Kempe played for Germany at under-16 and under-19 level.

== Personal life ==
His father Thomas Kempe was also a professional footballer as is his younger brother Tobias.
