= Philipp Riese =

German footballer

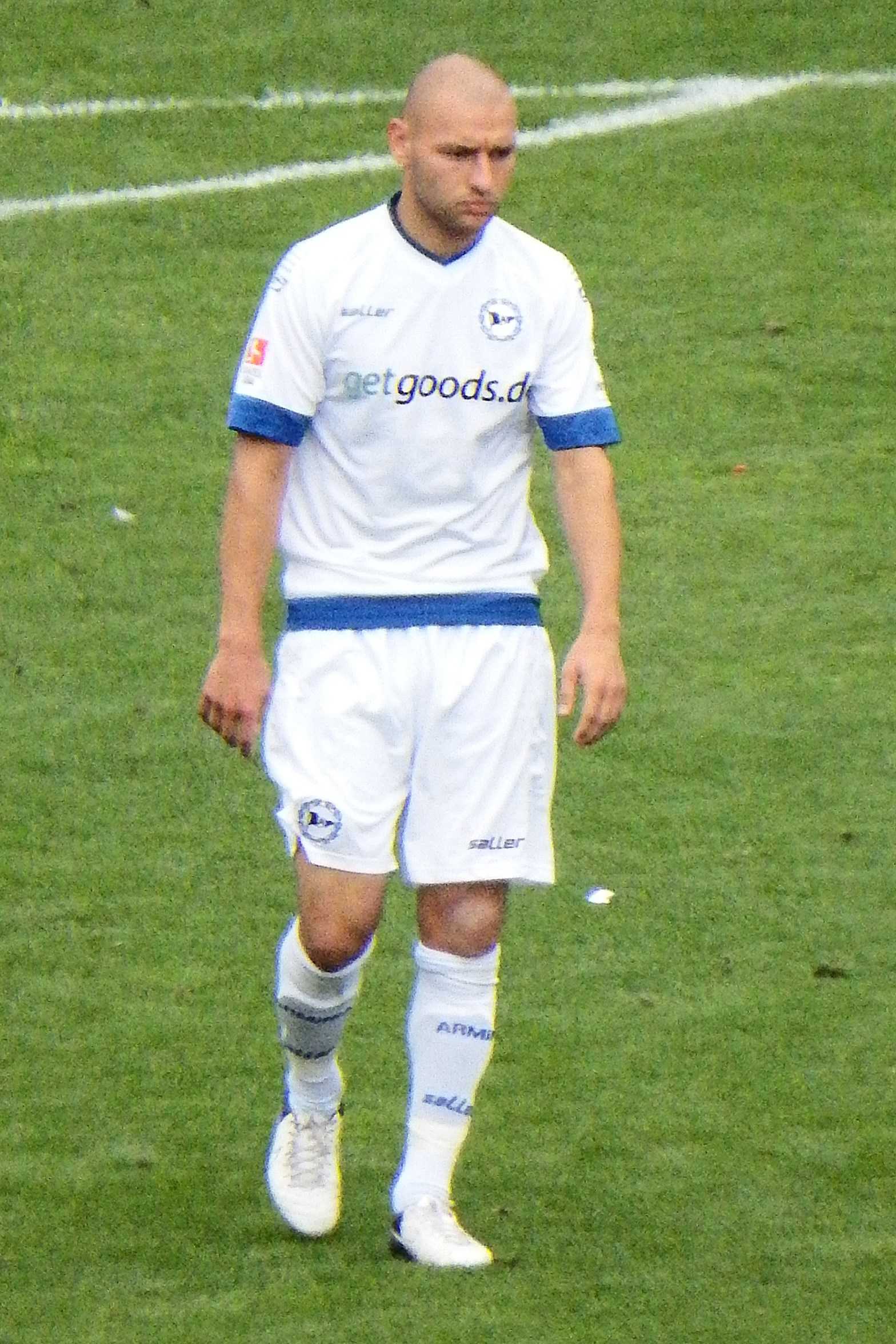
- Riese with Arminia Bielefeld in 2013

Personal information
- Date of birth: 12 November 1989 (age 37)
- Place of birth: Meuselwitz, East Germany
- Height: 1.75 m (5 ft 9 in)
- Position: Central midfielder

Youth career
- 1994–1999: FSV Meuselwitz
- 1999–2004: VfB Leipzig
- 2004–2006: 1. FC Lokomotive Leipzig
- 2006–2009: ZFC Meuselwitz

Senior career*
Years	Team	Apps	(Gls)
2009–2012	ZFC Meuselwitz	87	(2)
2012–2014	Arminia Bielefeld	49	(3)
2014–2015	1. FC Heidenheim	10	(0)
2015–2022	Erzgebirge Aue	167	(5)
2022–2023	Erzgebirge Aue	0	(0)

Managerial career
- 2022: Erzgebirge Aue (assistant)
- 2023–: Erzgebirge Aue (assistant)
- * Club domestic league appearances and goals

Philipp Riese (born 12 November 1989) is a German professional football coach and a former central midfielder. He is an assistant coach with Erzgebirge Aue.

== Career ==
Riese announced his retirement as a player in the summer 2022, and in November 2022 he decided to come back to playing with Erzgebirge Aue. On 4 February 2023, Riese retired from playing once again.
