= Sebastian Mrowca =

Polish footballer

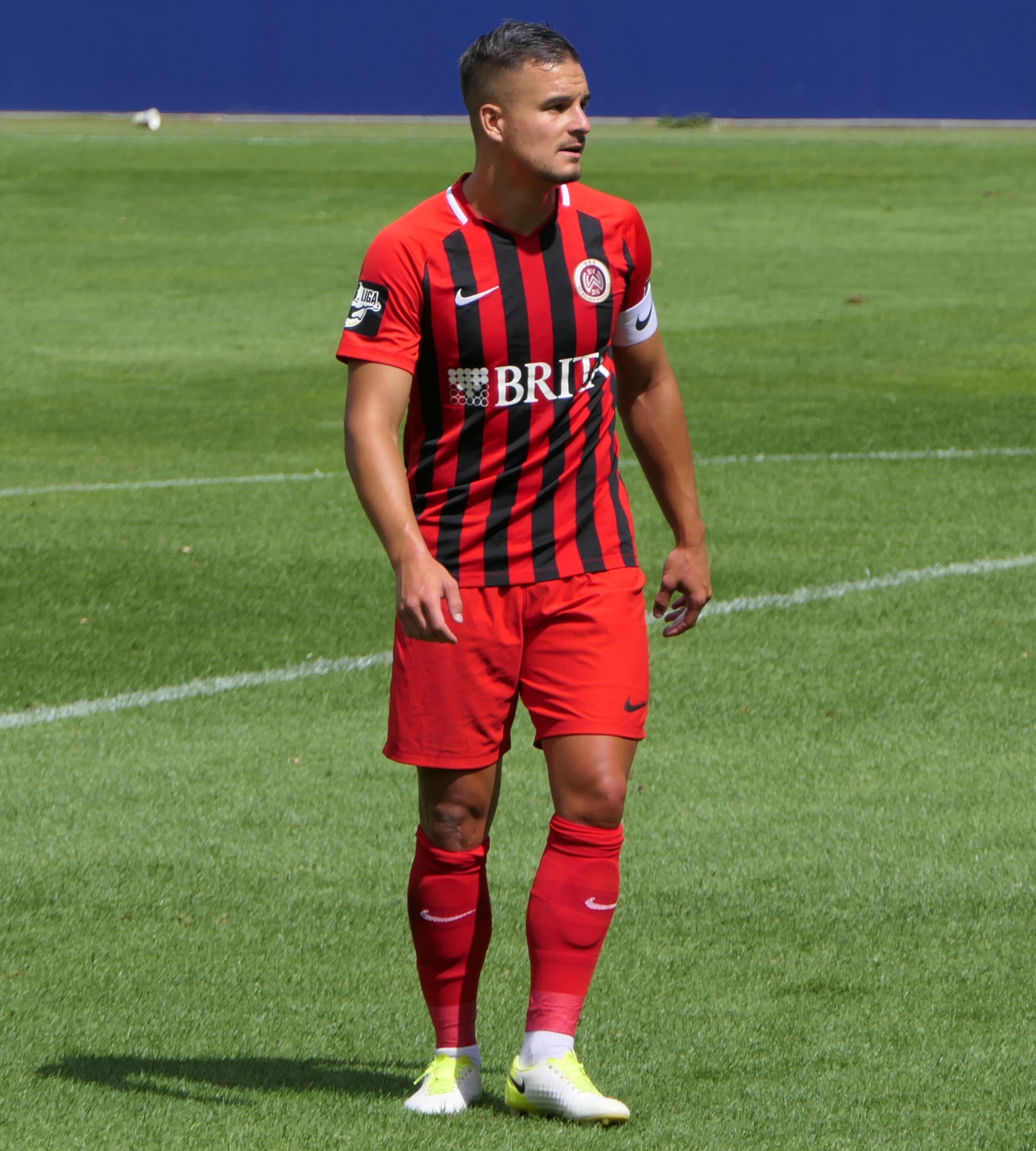
- Mrowca with SV Wehen Wiesbaden in 2018

Personal information
- Date of birth: 16 January 1994 (age 32)
- Place of birth: Hausham, Germany
- Height: 1.75 m (5 ft 9 in)
- Position: Defensive midfielder

Youth career
- 2004–2013: Bayern Munich

Senior career*
Years	Team	Apps	(Gls)
2013	Bayern Munich II	0	(0)
2013–2014	Energie Cottbus	1	(0)
2014–2023	SV Wehen Wiesbaden	197	(4)
2023–2025	SC Preußen Münster	40	(1)

International career
2013	Poland U19	4	(0)
2014	Poland U20	2	(0)
- * Club domestic league appearances and goals as of 24 May 2025

Sebastian Mrowca (born 16 January 1994) is a professional footballer who plays as a defensive midfielder. Born in Germany, he has represented Poland at youth level.

== Club career ==
=== Bayern Munich ===
Mrowca joined the youth ranks of German record champions Bayern Munich at the age of ten in 2004. Later he became captain of their U19 team. During the 2012–13 Regionalliga season he was promoted to their reserve team. He didn't make any appearance but was on the bench for three times.

=== Energie Cottbus ===
In June 2013, Mrowca signed for Energie Cottbus on a three-year deal until 2016. He made his 2. Bundesliga debut in the first match of the 2013–14 season on 22 July 2013 against Fortuna Düsseldorf.

=== SV Wehen Wiesbaden ===
He left Energie Cottbus after just one season and signed a two-year contract with 3. Liga club SV Wehen Wiesbaden in the Hessian capital.

=== SC Preußen Münster ===
On 26 June 2023, after nine years at Wehen Wiesbaden, Mrowca moved to 3. Liga club SC Preußen Münster. He left the club upon the expiration of his contract in June 2025.
