= Robert Herrmann =

German footballer (born 1993)

Personal information
- Date of birth: 10 August 1993 (age 33)
- Place of birth: Strausberg, Germany
- Height: 1.81 m (5 ft 11 in)
- Position: Left-back

Team information
- Current team: Lupo Martini Wolfsburg
- Number: 28

Youth career
- –2004: FC Strausberg
- 2004–2012: Union Berlin

Senior career*
Years	Team	Apps	(Gls)
2011–2013	Union Berlin II	23	(0)
2013–2014	Hannover 96 II	33	(6)
2014–2017	VfL Wolfsburg II	92	(8)
2017–2018	SV Sandhausen II	16	(3)
2017–2018	SV Sandhausen	1	(0)
2018–2021	Erzgebirge Aue	14	(0)
2019–2020	→ Würzburger Kickers (loan)	31	(3)
2020–2022	Würzburger Kickers	45	(5)
2022–2023	FSV Zwickau	22	(0)
2023–	Lupo Martini Wolfsburg	20	(8)
- * Club domestic league appearances and goals as of 20 May 2024

Robert Herrmann (born 10 August 1993) is a German footballer who plays as a left back for Lupo Martini Wolfsburg.
