= Nicolás Sessa =

German footballer (born 1996)

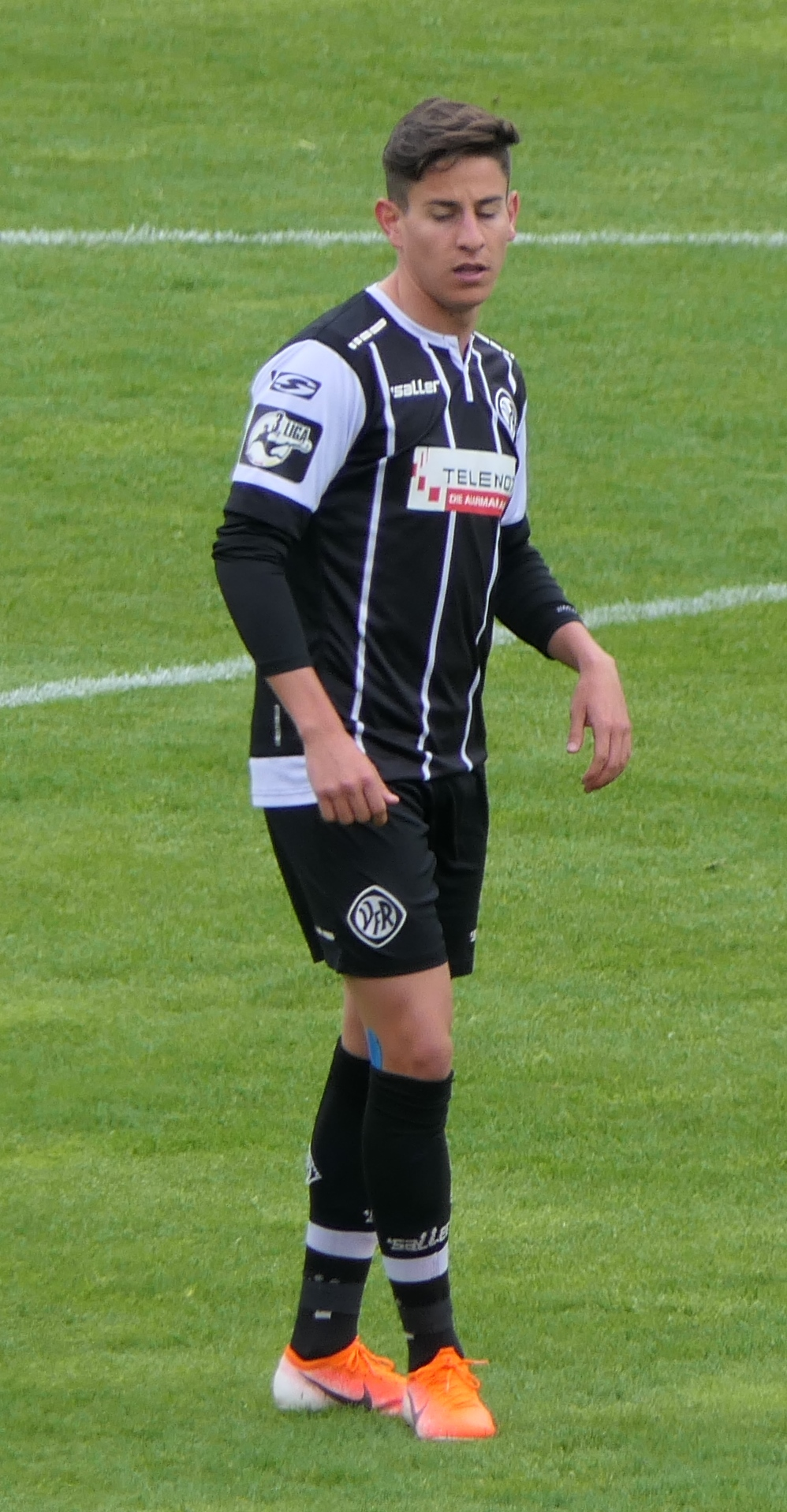
- Sessa with VfR Aalen in 2019

Personal information
- Date of birth: 23 March 1996 (age 30)
- Place of birth: Stuttgart, Germany
- Height: 1.72 m (5 ft 8 in)
- Position: Midfielder

Team information
- Current team: VfB Stuttgart II
- Number: 30

Youth career
- SV Fellbach
- FSV Waiblingen
- 1. FC Normannia Gmünd
- –2012: SSV Reutlingen
- 2012: SGV Freiberg
- 2013–2015: 1899 Hoffenheim

Senior career*
| Years | Team | Apps | (Gls) |
| 2015–2017 | 1899 Hoffenheim II | 38 | (3) |
| 2017–2018 | VfB Stuttgart II | 39 | (17) |
| 2017–2018 | VfB Stuttgart | 0 | (0) |
| 2018–2019 | VfR Aalen | 30 | (6) |
| 2019–2020 | Erzgebirge Aue | 2 | (0) |
| 2020–2022 | 1. FC Kaiserslautern | 27 | (0) |
| 2022 | 1. FC Kaiserslautern II | 1 | (0) |
| 2022–2024 | SC Verl | 54 | (13) |
| 2024– | VfB Stuttgart II | 53 | (10) |

International career
| 2013 | Germany U18 | 1 | (1) |
- * Club domestic league appearances and goals as of 30 May 2026

Nicolás Sessa (born 23 March 1996) is a German professional footballer who plays as a midfielder for 3. Liga club VfB Stuttgart II.

== Career ==
In August 2022, after 1. FC Kaiserslautern's promotion to the 2. Bundesliga, Sessa left the club to join 3. Liga side SC Verl.

== Personal life ==
Sessa is of Argentine descent through his father. His younger brother Kevin is also a footballer.
