= Philipp Zulechner =

Austrian footballer (born 1990)

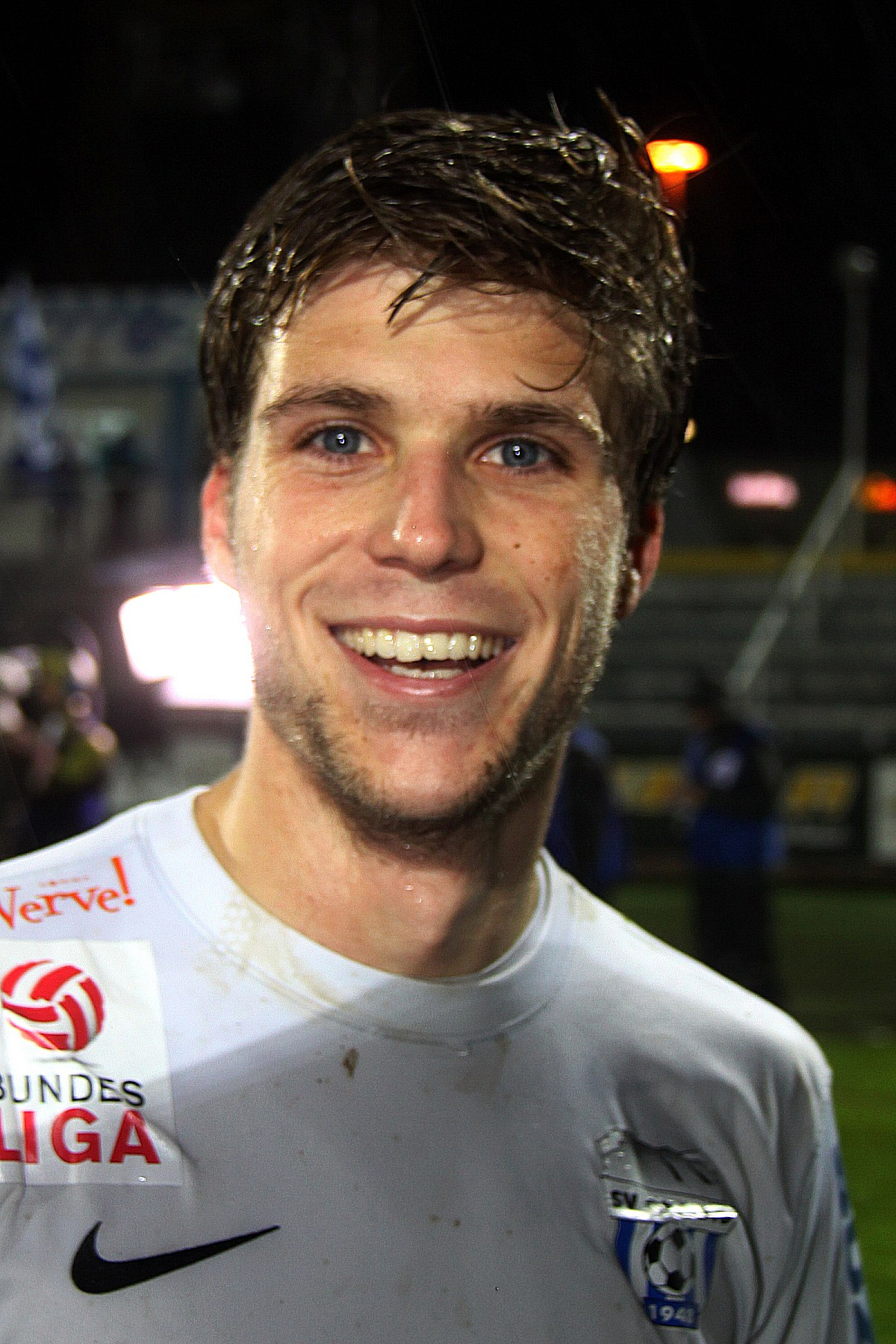
- Zulechner with SV Grödig in 2013

Personal information
- Date of birth: 12 April 1990 (age 36)
- Place of birth: Vienna, Austria
- Height: 1.82 m (6 ft 0 in)
- Position: Forward

Senior career*
Years	Team	Apps	(Gls)
2007–2010	Red Bull Salzburg	0	(0)
2010	SV Grödig	11	(0)
2010–2013	SV Horn	75	(31)
2013–2014	SV Grödig	20	(15)
2014–2016	SC Freiburg	9	(1)
2015	→ Austria Wien (loan)	23	(1)
2016	→ Young Boys (loan)	8	(0)
2016–2018	Sturm Graz	33	(5)
2019–2021	Erzgebirge Aue	60	(7)
2022	Hallescher FC	11	(2)
2022	Odd 2	4	(1)
2022	Odd	2	(0)
Total		266	(63)

International career
2013	Austria	1	(0)
- * Club domestic league appearances and goals

Philipp Zulechner (born 12 April 1990) is an Austrian former professional footballer who played as a forward.

== Club career ==
In January 2014, Zulechner moved to Germany and signed for Bundesliga side Freiburg.

In January 2015, after a year with Freiburg, he returned to his native Austria and joined Austria Wien on loan for the remainder of the season. Austria Wien had the option to extend the loan for another year as well as to sign him on a permanent basis.

On 8 December 2015, it was announced that Zulechner would join Swiss Young Boys on loan effective 1 January 2016, the deal including an option for a permanent sign in July 2016.

On 31 August 2016, Zulechner joined Sturm Graz on a free transfer signing a two-year contract. He suffered from a staphylococcus infection, which led to him spending two weeks in a wheelchair. He left Sturm Graz at the end of the season.

Zulechner joined 2. Bundesliga club Erzgebirge Aue on 30 January 2019. In November 2019, he extended his contract with Aue until 2023. His contract with Aue was terminated in August 2021.

On 31 January 2022, Zulechner signed for 3. Liga club Hallescher FC. In the summer he moved on to Norwegian top-tier club Odd, but the stay became short-lived and he was released at the end of 2022.

In June 2023, at the age of 33, Zulechner announced his retirement from playing.

== International career ==
Zulechner made his senior international debut for the Austria on 19 November 2013 in a 1–0 victory in a friendly against the United States.
