= Pascal Testroet =

German footballer

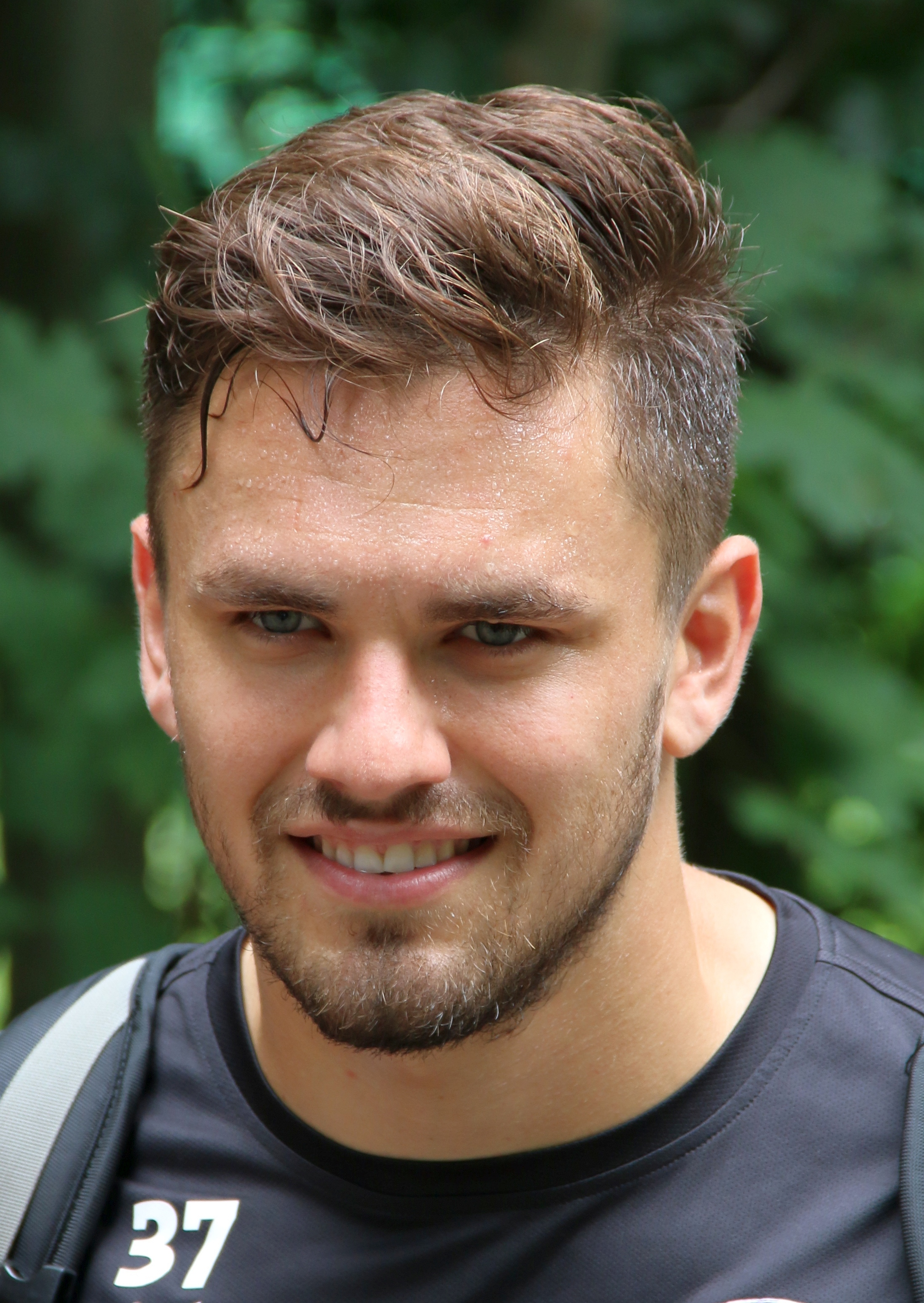
- Testroet with Dynamo Dresden in 2016

Personal information
- Date of birth: 26 September 1990 (age 36)
- Place of birth: Bocholt, West Germany
- Height: 1.84 m (6 ft 0 in)
- Position: Forward

Team information
- Current team: SV Sandhausen
- Number: 37

Youth career
- 1995–1996: SV Biemenhorst
- 1996–1999: FC Olympia Bocholt
- 1999–2000: VfL Rhede
- 2000–2008: Schalke 04

Senior career*
Years	Team	Apps	(Gls)
2009–2011	Werder Bremen II	59	(15)
2011–2012	Kickers Offenbach	21	(7)
2012–2015	Arminia Bielefeld	51	(9)
2013–2014	→ VfL Osnabrück (loan)	28	(9)
2015–2018	Dynamo Dresden	60	(21)
2018–2021	Erzgebirge Aue	95	(34)
2021–2022	SV Sandhausen	27	(10)
2022–2025	FC Ingolstadt	86	(23)
2025–	SV Sandhausen	30	(21)
- * Club domestic league appearances and goals as of 26 June 2026

Pascal Testroet (born 26 September 1990) is a German professional footballer who plays as a forward for SV Sandhausen.

== Career ==
Testroet played over 50 matches in the 3. Liga for Werder Bremen's reserve side. On 8 June 2011, he signed a contract with 3. Liga team Kickers Offenbach.

In August 2018, he joined Erzgebirge Aue from 2. Bundesliga rivals Dynamo Dresden having agreed a three-year deal.

On 1 June 2022, Testroet signed with FC Ingolstadt.

== Career statistics ==
As of match played on 9 July 2021

Appearances and goals by club, season and competition
Club	Season	League			Cup		Total	
Club	Season	Division	Apps	Goals	Apps	Goals	Apps	Goals
Schalke 04 II	2007–08	Oberliga Westfalen	1	1	—		1	1
Werder Bremen II	2008–09	3. Liga	11	1	—		11	1
Werder Bremen II	2009–10	3. Liga	17	8	—		17	8
Werder Bremen II	2010–11	3. Liga	31	6	—		31	6
Werder Bremen II	Total		59	15	—		59	15
Kickers Offenbach	2011–12	3. Liga	21	7	—		21	7
Arminia Bielefeld	2012–13	3. Liga	32	5	2	0	34	5
Arminia Bielefeld	2014–15	3. Liga	19	4	1	0	3	1
Arminia Bielefeld	Total		51	9	3	0	54	9
VfL Osnabrück (loan)	2013–14	3. Liga	28	9	—		28	9
Arminia Bielefeld II	2014–15	Oberliga Westfalen	2	1	—		2	1
Dynamo Dresden	2015–16	3. Liga	30	18	—		30	18
Dynamo Dresden	2016–17	2. Bundesliga	23	3	2	0	25	3
Dynamo Dresden	2017–18	2. Bundesliga	7	0	—		7	0
Dynamo Dresden	Total		60	21	2	0	62	21
Erzgebirge Aue	2018–19	2. Bundesliga	33	15	1	1	34	16
Erzgebirge Aue	2019–20	2. Bundesliga	29	7	2	2	31	9
Erzgebirge Aue	2020–21	2. Bundesliga	33	12	1	0	32	12
Erzgebirge Aue	Total		95	34	4	3	97	37
Career total			327	97	9	3	224	100
