= Robert Jendrusch =

German footballer

Personal information
- Date of birth: 28 May 1996 (age 30)
- Place of birth: Bad Schlema, Germany
- Height: 1.91 m (6 ft 3 in)
- Position: Goalkeeper

Team information
- Current team: 1. FC Kaan-Marienborn
- Number: 26

Youth career
- 2001–2002: SV Auerhammer
- 2002–2015: Erzgebirge Aue

Senior career*
Years	Team	Apps	(Gls)
2013–2014	Erzgebirge Aue II	19	(0)
2015–2020	Erzgebirge Aue	10	(0)
2020–2022	FC Ingolstadt 04	8	(0)
2022–	1. FC Kaan-Marienborn	16	(0)
- * Club domestic league appearances and goals as of 12 November 2022

Robert Jendrusch (born 28 May 1996) is a German professional footballer who plays as a goalkeeper for 1. FC Kaan-Marienborn.

== Post-football career ==
After retiring from professional football, Jendrusch ended his active playing career and transitioned into a new professional field. Since 2024, he has been the franchise partner and manager of the Munich branch of baby&family, a German retail chain specializing in baby and toddler products.

In this role, he focuses on personal customer service, sustainable product choices, and family-oriented retail experiences. This marks his transition from professional sports into entrepreneurship outside of football.
