= Calogero Rizzuto =

German footballer

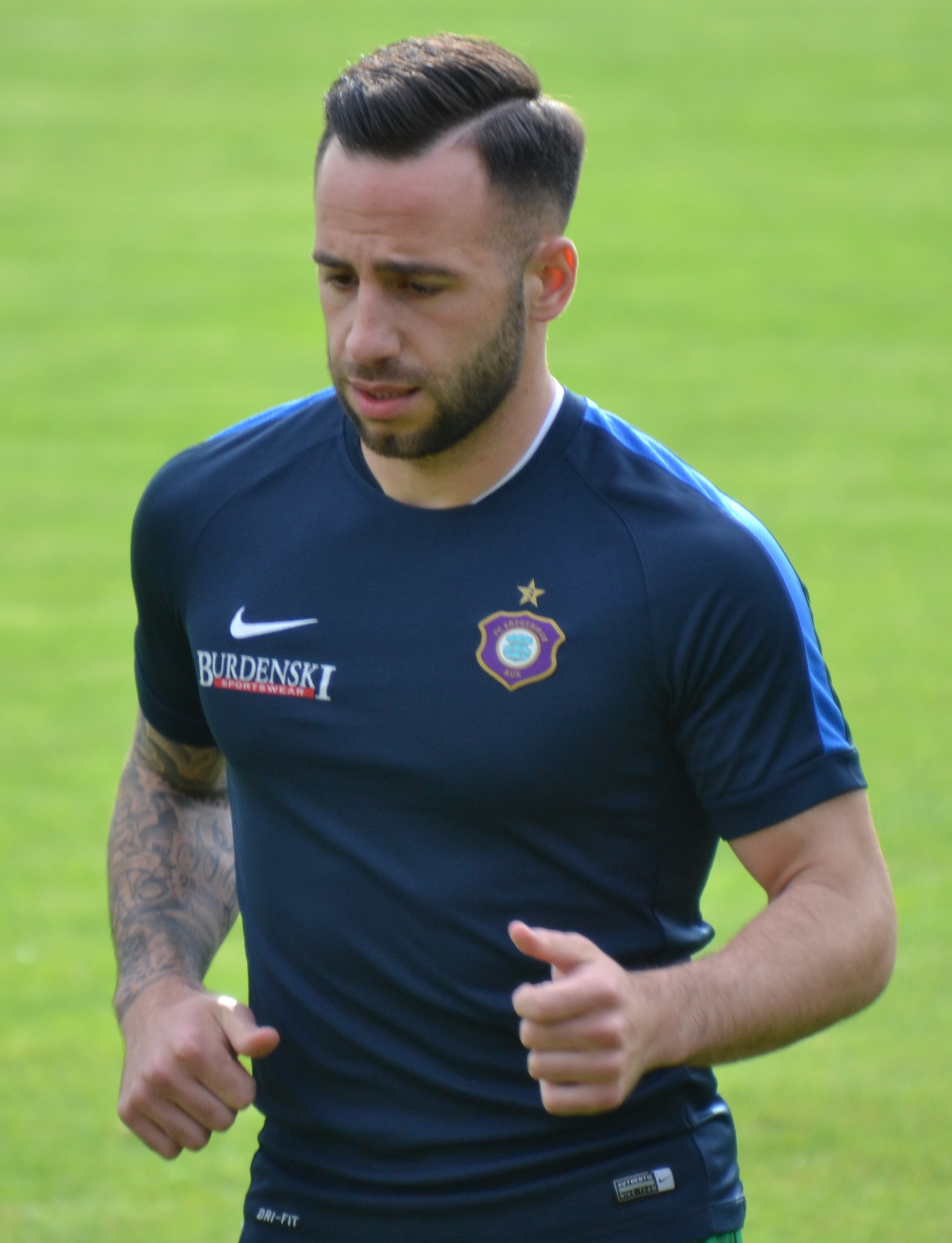
- Rizzuto with Erzgebirge Aue in 2016

Personal information
- Date of birth: 5 January 1992 (age 34)
- Place of birth: Saarbrücken, Germany
- Height: 1.70 m (5 ft 7 in)
- Position: Right-back

Team information
- Current team: 1. FC Saarbrücken
- Number: 7

Youth career
- 2008–2011: 1. FC Kaiserslautern

Senior career*
Years	Team	Apps	(Gls)
2011–2015	1. FC Kaiserslautern II	96	(1)
2015–2021	Erzgebirge Aue	170	(1)
2021–2022	Hansa Rostock	28	(0)
2022–	1. FC Saarbrücken	122	(10)

International career^{‡}
2009	Germany U17	2	(0)
- * Club domestic league appearances and goals as of 30 May 2026 ‡ National team caps and goals as of 25 January 2017

Calogero Rizzuto (born 5 January 1992) is a German professional footballer who plays as a right-back for 1. FC Saarbrücken.

Rizzuto is a former youth international for Germany at the U17 level.
