= Sascha Härtel =

German footballer

Personal information
- Date of birth: 9 March 1999 (age 27)
- Place of birth: Bad Schlema, Germany
- Height: 1.74 m (5 ft 9 in)
- Position: Defender

Youth career
- –2011: Concordia Schneeberg
- 2011–2018: Erzgebirge Aue

Senior career*
Years	Team	Apps	(Gls)
2017–2022	Erzgebirge Aue	16	(1)
2019	→ Sportfreunde Lotte (loan)	8	(0)
2019–2020	→ FSV Zwickau (loan)	1	(0)
- * Club domestic league appearances and goals as of 15 May 2022

Sascha Härtel (born 9 March 1999) is a German professional footballer who plays as a defender.

== Career ==
Härtel made his professional debut for Erzgebirge Aue on 18 August 2018, starting in the first round of the 2018–19 DFB-Pokal against Bundesliga side Mainz 05. The match finished as a 3–1 home loss for Aue.
