= John-Patrick Strauß =

Filipino footballer (born 1996)

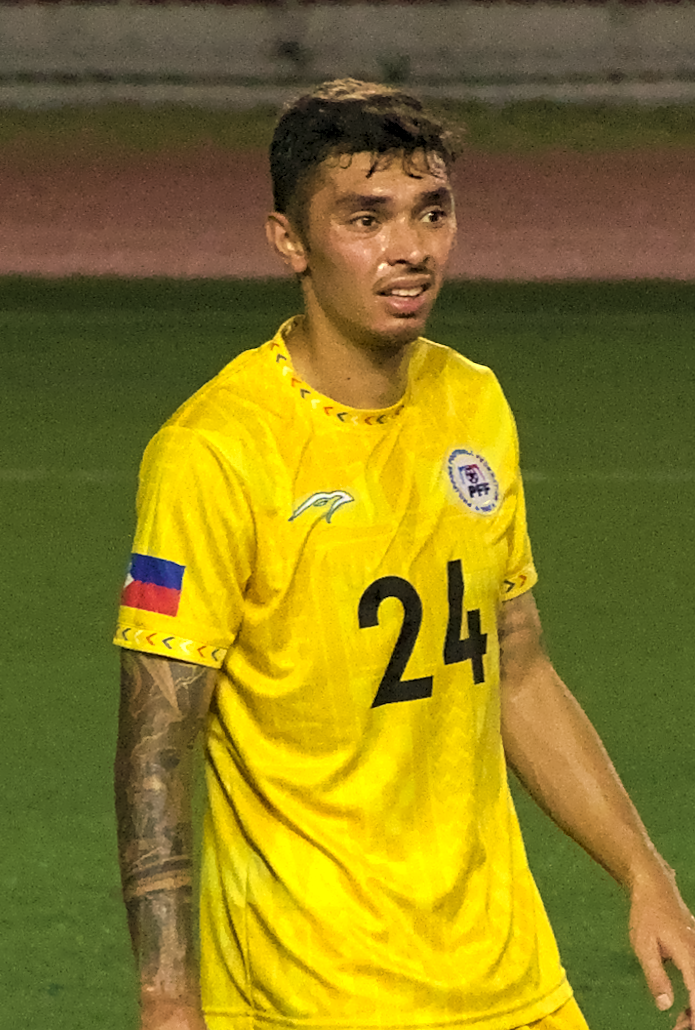
- Strauß playing for Philippines in 2023

Personal information
- Full name: John-Patrick Regalario Strauß
- Date of birth: 28 January 1996 (age 30)
- Place of birth: Wetzlar, Germany
- Height: 1.77 m (5 ft 10 in)
- Positions: Right-back; defensive midfielder

Team information
- Current team: Bangkok United

Youth career
- 2000–2008: FC Cleeberg
- 2008–2012: TSG Wieseck
- 2012–2015: RB Leipzig

Senior career*
Years	Team	Apps	(Gls)
2015–2017	RB Leipzig II	52	(10)
2017–2022	Erzgebirge Aue	103	(3)
2022–2024	Hansa Rostock	24	(1)
2024–2026	Muangthong United	54	(2)
2026–	Bangkok United	0	(0)

International career^{‡}
2018–2024	Philippines	18	(2)
- * Club domestic league appearances and goals as of 00:39, 18 May 2026 (UTC) ‡ National team caps and goals as of 08:45; 12 October 2024 (UTC)

John-Patrick Regalario Strauß (born 28 January 1996) is a professional footballer who plays as a right-back or a defensive midfielder for Thai League 1 club Bangkok United.

== Club career ==
=== Youth ===
Born in Wetzlar, Germany, Strauß had his youth career at FC Cleeberg, TSG Wieseck and RB Leipzig.

=== RB Leipzig II ===
In 2016, after playing for the U17 and U19 team of Leipzig, Strauß was promoted to the second team.

=== Erzgebirge Aue ===
In 2017, Strauß signed a three-year contract with 2. Bundesliga club Erzgebirge Aue, he joined the club on a free transfer. In 2022, Erzgebirge Aue were relegated to 3. Liga.

=== Hansa Rostock ===
In 2022, after his 5-year stint with Aue, Strauß signed a two-year contract with 2. Bundesliga club Hansa Rostock, joining the club on a free transfer.

== International career ==
Strauß was born to a German father and a Filipino mother that made him eligible to play for Germany and the Philippines.

=== Philippines ===
In September 2018, Strauß received a call-up from the Philippines for a national team training camp and a friendly game against Bahrain. Strauß received his first cap for the Philippines in a friendly match against Oman, he came in as a substitute replacing Martin Steuble in the 67th minute of the match.

Strauß scored his first goal for the Philippines in a 4–1 win against Guam in the second round of the 2022 FIFA World Cup qualifiers. Two months later, Strauß scored his second goal for the Philippines in a 2–1 away win against Maldives.

== Career statistics ==
=== International ===
As of 11 October 2024

Appearances and goals by national team and year
National team	Year	Apps	Goals
Philippines	2018	5	0
Philippines	2019	7	2
Philippines	2022	1	0
Philippines	2023	4	0
Philippines	2024	1	0
Total		18	2

Scores and results list the Philippines' goal tally first.

#	Date	Venue	Opponent	Score	Result	Competition
1.	10 September 2019	GFA National Training Center, Dededo, Guam	Guam	4–1	4–1	2022 FIFA World Cup qualification
2.	14 November 2019	National Football Stadium, Malé, Maldives	Maldives	2–0	2–1	2022 FIFA World Cup qualification
