= Clemens Fandrich =

German footballer (born 1991)

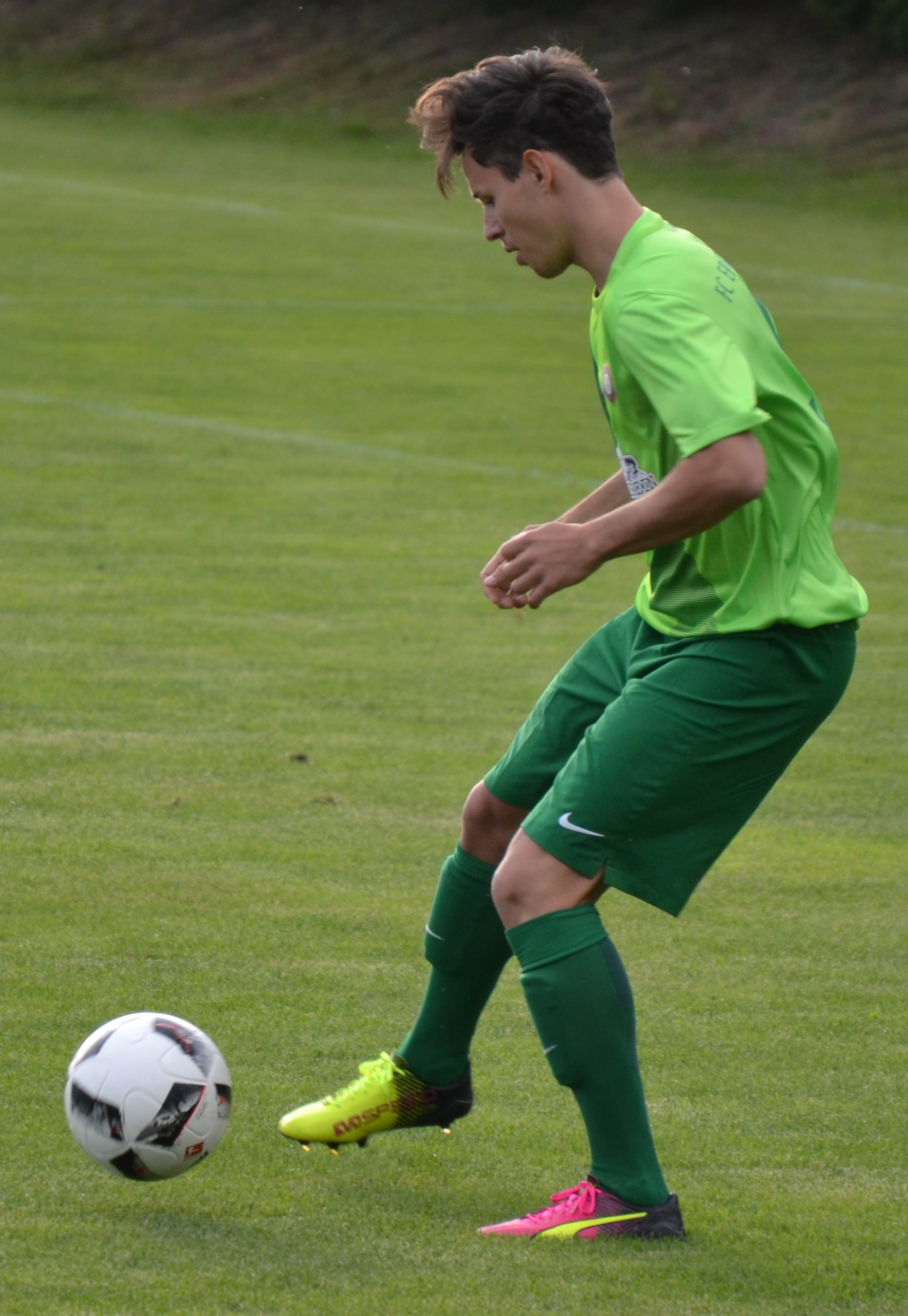
- Fandrich playing for Erzgebirge Aue in 2016

Personal information
- Date of birth: 10 January 1991 (age 35)
- Place of birth: Cottbus, Germany
- Height: 1.77 m (5 ft 10 in)
- Position: Attacking midfielder

Youth career
- 1995–1996: SV Werben
- 2007–2009: Energie Cottbus

Senior career*
Years	Team	Apps	(Gls)
2009–2013	Energie Cottbus II	21	(2)
2009–2013	Energie Cottbus	27	(1)
2013–2015	RB Leipzig	42	(3)
2015	→ Erzgebirge Aue (loan)	12	(2)
2015–2016	FC Luzern	22	(0)
2016–2022	Erzgebirge Aue	166	(6)
2022–2023	Rot-Weiss Essen	23	(0)
2023	VfB 1921 Krieschow	2	(0)
- * Club domestic league appearances and goals as of 07:37, 4 July 2024 (UTC)

Clemens Fandrich (born 10 January 1991) is a German professional footballer who plays as an attacking midfielder.

== Career ==
In 2013, Fandrich left his hometown club Energie Cottbus to sign for RB Leipzig for a fee of €80,000.

In June 2015, Fandrich left RB Leipzig, signing for Swiss Super League side FC Luzern. However, in the summer of 2016, Fandrich signed for Erzgebirge Aue from FC Luzern on a free transfer.

In October 2023 Fandrich signed with NOFV-Oberliga Süd side VfB 1921 Krieschow.
