= Jan Hochscheidt =

German footballer

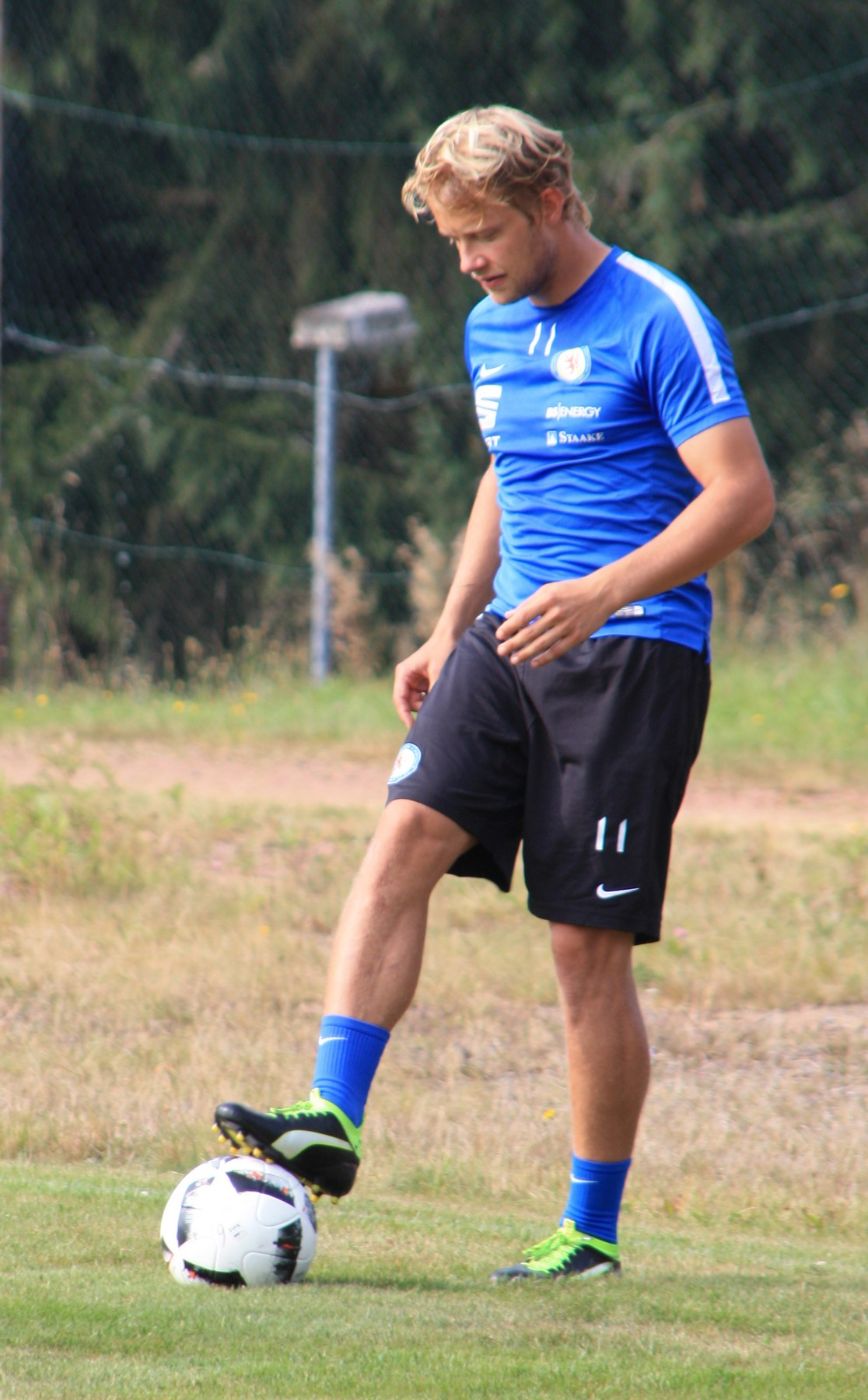
- Hochscheidt in 2016

Personal information
- Date of birth: 4 October 1987 (age 39)
- Place of birth: Trier, West Germany
- Height: 1.79 m (5 ft 10 in)
- Position: Midfielder

Youth career
- 1994–2000: Hertha Zehlendorf
- 2000–2004: Union Berlin
- 2004–2006: Energie Cottbus

Senior career*
| Years | Team | Apps | (Gls) |
| 2006–2008 | Energie Cottbus II | 42 | (5) |
| 2008–2013 | Erzgebirge Aue | 164 | (26) |
| 2013–2018 | Eintracht Braunschweig | 109 | (12) |
| 2014 | → Eintracht Braunschweig II | 2 | (0) |
| 2018–2022 | Erzgebirge Aue | 116 | (19) |
| Total | | 431 | (62) |
- * Club domestic league appearances and goals

Jan Hochscheidt (born 4 October 1987) is a German former professional footballer who played as a midfielder.

== Career ==
After starting his senior career in the reserve side of Energie Cottbus, Hochscheidt moved to Erzgebirge Aue in 2008, where he made his professional debut. After the 2012–13 2. Bundesliga season he transferred to Bundesliga side Eintracht Braunschweig.

In May 2018, Erzgebirge Aue announced Hochscheidt would return to the club for the 2018–19 season having agreed a contract until 2021. On 20 December 2019, he extended his contract with Aue until 2023.

He retired from playing in 2022. He later became part of Erzgebirge Aue's coaching staff.
