= List of German football transfers summer 2020 =

This is a list of transfers involving German football clubs during the 2020 summer transfer window. Only transfers of the Bundesliga and 2. Bundesliga are included.

Due to the COVID-19 pandemic in Germany and the resulting impact on the scheduling of the 2019–20 and 2020–21 seasons, the German Football Association modified the dates for the summer transfer window. To allow for the registration of players based on previously signed contracts, the window opened on 1 July 2020 for a single day. The transfer window then re-opened on 15 July and closed on 5 October 2020.

== Bundesliga ==
Note: Flags indicate national team as has been defined under FIFA eligibility rules. Players may hold more than one non-FIFA nationality.

=== Bayern Munich ===
In:

No.	Pos.	Nation	Player
10	FW	GER	Leroy Sané (from Manchester City)
11	FW	BRA	Douglas Costa (on loan from Juventus)
13	FW	CMR	Eric Maxim Choupo-Moting (from Paris Saint-Germain)
20	DF	FRA	Bouna Sarr (from Marseille)
22	MF	ESP	Marc Roca (from Espanyol)
23	DF	FRA	Tanguy Nianzou (from Paris Saint-Germain)
35	GK	GER	Alexander Nübel (from Schalke 04)

Out:

No.	Pos.	Nation	Player
2	DF	ESP	Álvaro Odriozola (loan return to Real Madrid)
6	MF	ESP	Thiago (to Liverpool)
10	MF	BRA	Philippe Coutinho (loan return to Barcelona)
14	MF	CRO	Ivan Perišić (loan return to Inter Milan)
28	MF	NZL	Sarpreet Singh (on loan to 1. FC Nürnberg)
33	DF	GER	Lars Lukas Mai (on loan to Darmstadt 98)
34	MF	GER	Oliver Batista Meier (on loan to Heerenveen)
36	GK	GER	Christian Früchtl (on loan to 1. FC Nürnberg)

=== Borussia Dortmund ===
In:

No.	Pos.	Nation	Player
20	MF	BRA	Reinier (on loan from Real Madrid)
22	MF	ENG	Jude Bellingham (from Birmingham City)
23	MF	GER	Emre Can (from Juventus, previously on loan)
24	DF	BEL	Thomas Meunier (from Paris Saint-Germain)

Out:

No.	Pos.	Nation	Player
5	DF	MAR	Achraf Hakimi (loan return to Real Madrid)
18	DF	ARG	Leonardo Balerdi (on loan to Marseille)
30	MF	NED	Immanuel Pherai (on loan to PEC Zwolle)
—	DF	TUR	Ömer Toprak (to Werder Bremen, previously on loan)
—	FW	GER	André Schürrle (retired, previously on loan at Spartak Moscow)
—	MF	GER	Dženis Burnić (to 1. FC Heidenheim, previously on loan at Dynamo Dresden)

=== RB Leipzig ===
In:

No.	Pos.	Nation	Player
3	DF	ESP	Angeliño (loan extension from Manchester City)
11	FW	KOR	Hwang Hee-chan (from Red Bull Salzburg)
19	FW	NOR	Alexander Sørloth (from Crystal Palace, previously on loan at Trabzonspor)
20	MF	GER	Lazar Samardžić (from Hertha BSC)
33	GK	ESP	Josep Martínez (from Las Palmas)
39	DF	GER	Benjamin Henrichs (on loan from AS Monaco)

Out:

No.	Pos.	Nation	Player
11	FW	GER	Timo Werner (to Chelsea)
19	MF	AUT	Hannes Wolf (on loan to Borussia Mönchengladbach)
21	FW	CZE	Patrik Schick (loan return to Roma)
26	DF	WAL	Ethan Ampadu (loan return to Chelsea)
28	GK	SUI	Yvon Mvogo (on loan to PSV)
37	DF	GER	Frederik Jäkel (on loan to Oostende)
42	DF	GER	Malik Talabidi (to Wil)
49	FW	DEN	Mads Bidstrup (to Brentford B)
53	MF	GER	Tom Krauß (on loan to 1. FC Nürnberg)

=== Borussia Mönchengladbach ===
In:

No.	Pos.	Nation	Player
11	MF	AUT	Hannes Wolf (on loan from RB Leipzig)
19	MF	AUT	Valentino Lazaro (on loan from Inter Milan, previously on loan at Newcastle United)

Out:

No.	Pos.	Nation	Player
5	MF	GER	Tobias Strobl (to FC Augsburg)
—	GK	GER	Moritz Nicolas (on loan to VfL Osnabrück, previously on loan at Union Berlin)

=== Bayer Leverkusen ===
In:

No.	Pos.	Nation	Player
14	FW	CZE	Patrik Schick (from Roma, previously on loan at RB Leipzig)
21	GK	GER	Lennart Grill (from 1. FC Kaiserslautern)

Out:

No.	Pos.	Nation	Player
28	GK	AUT	Ramazan Özcan (retired)
29	MF	GER	Kai Havertz (to Chelsea)
30	MF	POL	Adrian Stanilewicz (to Darmstadt 98)
31	FW	GER	Kevin Volland (to Monaco)
32	MF	MAR	Ayman Azhil (on loan to RKC Waalwijk)

=== 1899 Hoffenheim ===
In:

No.	Pos.	Nation	Player
16	MF	GER	Sebastian Rudy (loan extension from Schalke 04)
17	MF	ENG	Ryan Sessegnon (on loan from Tottenham Hotspur)
20	MF	SRB	Mijat Gaćinović (from Eintracht Frankfurt)

Out:

No.	Pos.	Nation	Player
17	MF	SUI	Steven Zuber (to Eintracht Frankfurt)
28	GK	GER	Michael Esser (to Hannover 96)
31	DF	BRA	Lucas Ribeiro (on loan to Internacional)
41	MF	ISR	Ilay Elmkies (on loan to ADO Den Haag)
—	GK	SUI	Gregor Kobel (to VfB Stuttgart, previously on loan)
—	MF	GER	Leonardo Bittencourt (to Werder Bremen, previously on loan)
—	FW	BRA	Felipe Pires (to Moreirense, previously on loan at Rijeka)

=== VfL Wolfsburg ===
In:

No.	Pos.	Nation	Player
4	DF	FRA	Maxence Lacroix (from Sochaux)
21	FW	POL	Bartosz Białek (from Zagłębie Lubin)

Out:

No.	Pos.	Nation	Player
4	MF	ESP	Ignacio Camacho (retired)
26	FW	USA	Ulysses Llanez (on loan to Heerenveen)
31	DF	GER	Robin Knoche (to Union Berlin)
32	DF	COD	Marcel Tisserand (to Fenerbahçe)
36	GK	GER	Phillip Menzel (to Austria Klagenfurt)
43	MF	GER	Julian Justvan (to SC Paderborn)
—	DF	GER	Felix Uduokhai (to FC Augsburg, previously on loan)
—	MF	GER	John Yeboah (to Willem II, previously on loan at VVV-Venlo)

=== SC Freiburg ===
In:

No.	Pos.	Nation	Player
1	GK	GER	Benjamin Uphoff (from Karlsruher SC)
8	MF	FRA	Baptiste Santamaria (from Angers)
11	FW	BIH	Ermedin Demirović (from Alavés, previously on loan at St. Gallen)
14	MF	NED	Guus Til (on loan from Spartak Moscow)
21	GK	GER	Florian Müller (on loan from Mainz 05)

Out:

No.	Pos.	Nation	Player
1	GK	GER	Alexander Schwolow (to Hertha BSC)
4	DF	GER	Nico Schlotterbeck (on loan to Union Berlin)
8	MF	GER	Mike Frantz (to Hannover 96)
11	FW	GER	Luca Waldschmidt (to Benfica)
16	MF	FRA	Yoric Ravet (to Grenoble)
21	FW	AUS	Brandon Borrello (on loan to Fortuna Düsseldorf)
25	DF	GER	Robin Koch (to Leeds United)
—	DF	GER	Pascal Stenzel (to VfB Stuttgart, previously on loan)
—	MF	GER	Jérôme Gondorf (to Karlsruher SC, previously on loan)
—	DF	ENG	Chima Okoroji (on loan to SC Paderborn, previously on loan at Jahn Regensburg)
—	FW	GER	Christoph Daferner (to Dynamo Dresden, previously on loan at Erzgebirge Aue)

=== Eintracht Frankfurt ===
In:

No.	Pos.	Nation	Player
11	MF	SUI	Steven Zuber (from 1899 Hoffenheim)
21	FW	GER	Ragnar Ache (from Sparta Rotterdam)
33	FW	POR	André Silva (from Milan, previously on loan)

Out:

No.	Pos.	Nation	Player
5	MF	SUI	Gelson Fernandes (retired)
11	MF	SRB	Mijat Gaćinović (to 1899 Hoffenheim)
16	MF	ESP	Lucas Torró (to Osasuna)
23	DF	GER	Marco Russ (retired)
26	MF	GER	Nils Stendera (on loan to Lok Leipzig)
30	MF	GER	Şahverdi Çetin (to MKE Ankaragücü)
38	MF	GER	Patrick Finger (to Olympia Biebesheim)
39	FW	POR	Gonçalo Paciência (on loan to Schalke 04)
–	DF	GUI	Simon Falette (to Hannover 96, previously on loan at Fenerbahçe)
—	FW	SRB	Dejan Joveljić (on loan to Wolfsberger AC, previously on loan at Anderlecht)
—	FW	CRO	Ante Rebić (to Milan, previously on loan)
—	MF	URU	Rodrigo Zalazar (on loan to FC St. Pauli, previously on loan at Korona Kielce)

=== Hertha BSC ===
In:

No.	Pos.	Nation	Player
1	GK	GER	Alexander Schwolow (from SC Freiburg)
15	FW	COL	Jhon Córdoba (from 1. FC Köln)
42	DF	NED	Deyovaisio Zeefuik (from FC Groningen)

Out:

No.	Pos.	Nation	Player
1	GK	GER	Thomas Kraft (retired)
3	MF	NOR	Per Ciljan Skjelbred (to Rosenborg)
8	FW	CIV	Salomon Kalou (to Botafogo)
12	GK	GER	Dennis Smarsch (to FC St. Pauli)
14	FW	GER	Pascal Köpke (to 1. FC Nürnberg)
15	MF	SRB	Marko Grujić (loan return to Liverpool)
19	FW	BIH	Vedad Ibišević (to Schalke 04)
30	FW	GER	Marius Wolf (loan return to Borussia Dortmund)
36	FW	TUR	Muhammed Kiprit (to KFC Uerdingen)
40	MF	GER	Lazar Samardžić (to RB Leipzig)
—	MF	SVK	Ondrej Duda (to 1. FC Köln, previously on loan at Norwich City)

=== Union Berlin ===
In:

No.	Pos.	Nation	Player
1	GK	GER	Andreas Luthe (from FC Augsburg)
4	DF	GER	Nico Schlotterbeck (on loan from SC Freiburg)
10	FW	GER	Max Kruse (from Fenerbahçe)
14	FW	NGR	Taiwo Awoniyi (on loan from Liverpool, previously on loan at Mainz 05)
15	FW	GER	Marius Bülter (from 1. FC Magdeburg, previously on loan)
18	MF	JPN	Keita Endo (on loan from Yokohama Marinos)
23	DF	GER	Niko Gießelmann (from Fortuna Düsseldorf)
31	DF	GER	Robin Knoche (from VfL Wolfsburg)
33	MF	GER	Sebastian Griesbeck (from 1. FC Heidenheim)
36	FW	GER	Cedric Teuchert (from Schalke 04, previously on loan at Hannover 96)

Out:

No.	Pos.	Nation	Player
1	GK	POL	Rafał Gikiewicz (to FC Augsburg)
3	DF	SRB	Neven Subotić (to Denizlispor)
9	FW	GER	Sebastian Polter (to Fortuna Sittard)
10	FW	SWE	Sebastian Andersson (to 1. FC Köln)
14	DF	GER	Ken Reichel (to VfL Osnabrück)
16	FW	GER	Laurenz Dehl (on loan to Hallescher FC)
17	MF	AUT	Florian Flecker (to Würzburger Kickers)
18	MF	TUR	Yunus Mallı (loan return to VfL Wolfsburg)
20	FW	NGR	Suleiman Abdullahi (on loan to Eintracht Braunschweig)
23	MF	GER	Felix Kroos (to Eintracht Braunschweig)
26	MF	GER	Julius Kade (to Dynamo Dresden)
29	DF	GER	Michael Parensen (retired)
31	DF	GER	Keven Schlotterbeck (loan return to SC Freiburg)
35	GK	GER	Moritz Nicolas (loan return to Borussia Mönchengladbach)
39	GK	GER	Leo Oppermann (to Hamburger SV II)
—	DF	GER	Nicolai Rapp (loan extension to Darmstadt 98)
—	DF	USA	Lennard Maloney (to Borussia Dortmund II, previously on loan at Chemnitzer FC)

=== Schalke 04 ===
In:

No.	Pos.	Nation	Player
11	FW	BIH	Vedad Ibišević (from Hertha BSC)
18	FW	POR	Gonçalo Paciência (on loan from Eintracht Frankfurt)

Out:

No.	Pos.	Nation	Player
2	MF	USA	Weston McKennie (on loan to Juventus)
3	DF	ESP	Juan Miranda (loan return to Barcelona)
11	FW	AUT	Michael Gregoritsch (loan return to FC Augsburg)
18	MF	GER	Daniel Caligiuri (to FC Augsburg)
19	FW	AUT	Guido Burgstaller (to FC St. Pauli)
20	DF	ENG	Jonjoe Kenny (loan return to Everton)
21	DF	FRA	Jean-Clair Todibo (loan return to Barcelona)
35	GK	GER	Alexander Nübel (to Bayern Munich)
—	DF	ESP	Pablo Insua (to Huesca, previously on loan)
—	DF	GER	Jonas Carls (on loan to Vitória Guimarães, previously on loan at Viktoria Köln)
—	FW	GHA	Bernard Tekpetey (on loan to Ludogorets Razgrad, previously on loan at Fortuna Düsseldorf)
—	FW	GER	Cedric Teuchert (to Union Berlin, previously on loan at Hannover 96)

=== Mainz 05 ===
In:

No.	Pos.	Nation	Player
13	DF	BEL	Dimitri Lavalée (from Standard Liège)
15	DF	GER	Luca Kilian (from SC Paderborn)

Out:

No.	Pos.	Nation	Player
1	GK	GER	Florian Müller (on loan to SC Freiburg)
2	DF	FRA	Ronaël Pierre-Gabriel (on loan to Brest)
13	DF	NED	Jeffrey Bruma (loan return to VfL Wolfsburg)
17	DF	GER	Jonathan Meier (on loan to Dynamo Dresden)
22	FW	NGR	Taiwo Awoniyi (loan return to Liverpool)
—	MF	ROU	Alexandru Maxim (to Gaziantep, previously on loan)
—	FW	GER	Gerrit Holtmann (to VfL Bochum, previously on loan at SC Paderborn)
—	FW	GER	Aaron Seydel (to Darmstadt 98, previously on loan at Jahn Regensburg)

=== 1. FC Köln ===
In:

No.	Pos.	Nation	Player
7	FW	NGR	Tolu Arokodare (on loan from Valmiera)
9	FW	SWE	Sebastian Andersson (from Union Berlin)
15	MF	GRE	Dimitrios Limnios (from PAOK)
16	GK	GER	Ron-Robert Zieler (on loan from Hannover 96)
18	MF	SVK	Ondrej Duda (from Hertha BSC, previously on loan at Norwich City)

Out:

No.	Pos.	Nation	Player
7	MF	GER	Marcel Risse (on loan to Viktoria Köln)
8	MF	BEL	Birger Verstraete (on loan to Antwerp)
9	FW	GER	Simon Terodde (to Hamburger SV)
11	MF	GHA	Kingsley Schindler (on loan to Hannover 96)
15	FW	COL	Jhon Córdoba (to Hertha BSC)
18	GK	GER	Thomas Kessler (retired)
23	FW	GER	Mark Uth (loan return to Schalke 04)
31	GK	USA	Brady Scott (to Nashville SC)
36	MF	GER	Niklas Hauptmann (on loan to Holstein Kiel)
37	DF	GER	Toni Leistner (loan return to QPR)
—	DF	GER	Yann Aurel Bisseck (on loan to Vitória Guimarães, previously on loan at Roda JC Kerkrade)
—	DF	GER	Lasse Sobiech (on loan to FC Zürich, previously on loan at Mouscron)
—	MF	CZE	Tomáš Ostrák (on loan to MFK Karviná, previously on loan at TSV Hartberg)
—	MF	FRA	Vincent Koziello (on loan to Nacional, previously on loan at Paris FC)
—	MF	AUT	Louis Schaub (on loan to FC Luzern, previously on loan at Hamburger SV)
—	GK	GER	Jan-Christoph Bartels (to Waldhof Mannheim, previously on loan at Wehen Wiesbaden)

=== FC Augsburg ===
In:

No.	Pos.	Nation	Player
1	GK	POL	Rafał Gikiewicz (from Union Berlin)
2	DF	POL	Robert Gumny (from Lech Poznań)
19	DF	GER	Felix Uduokhai (from VfL Wolfsburg, previously on loan)
20	MF	GER	Daniel Caligiuri (from Schalke 04)
33	MF	GER	Tobias Strobl (from Borussia Mönchengladbach)

Out:

No.	Pos.	Nation	Player
1	GK	GER	Andreas Luthe (to Union Berlin)
2	DF	SUI	Stephan Lichtsteiner (retired)
9	FW	VEN	Sergio Córdova (on loan to Arminia Bielefeld)
10	MF	GER	Daniel Baier (retired)
13	GK	GER	Fabian Giefer (to Würzburger Kickers)
15	DF	CRO	Jozo Stanić (on loan to FSV Zwickau)
16	DF	CRO	Tin Jedvaj (loan return to Bayer Leverkusen)
31	DF	GER	Philipp Max (to PSV)
34	MF	AUT	Georg Teigl (to Austria Wien)
37	FW	GER	Maurice Malone (on loan to Wehen Wiesbaden)
—	DF	AUT	Kevin Danso (on loan to Fortuna Düsseldorf, previously on loan at Southampton)
—	DF	GER	Tim Rieder (to 1. FC Kaiserslautern, previously on loan at 1860 Munich)

=== Werder Bremen ===
In:

No.	Pos.	Nation	Player
10	MF	GER	Leonardo Bittencourt (from 1899 Hoffenheim, previously on loan)
16	FW	GER	Oscar Schönfelder (from Mainz 05 youth)
17	DF	GER	Felix Agu (from VfL Osnabrück)
21	DF	TUR	Ömer Toprak (from Borussia Dortmund, previously on loan)
22	MF	NED	Tahith Chong (on loan from Manchester United)
29	MF	GER	Patrick Erras (from 1. FC Nürnberg)

Out:

No.	Pos.	Nation	Player
3	DF	GER	Kevin Vogt (loan return to 1899 Hoffenheim)
4	DF	SUI	Michael Lang (loan return to Borussia Mönchengladbach)
14	FW	PER	Claudio Pizarro (retired)
17	MF	TUR	Nuri Şahin (to Antalyaspor)
22	MF	GER	Fin Bartels (to Holstein Kiel)
39	MF	GER	Benjamin Goller (on loan to Karlsruher SC)
40	GK	GER	Luca Plogmann (on loan to SV Meppen)
—	MF	GER	Thore Jacobsen (loan extension to 1. FC Magdeburg)
—	DF	GER	Jan-Niklas Beste (on loan to Jahn Regensburg, previously on loan at Emmen)
—	DF	SWE	Felix Beijmo (to Malmö, previously on loan at Greuther Fürth)

=== Arminia Bielefeld ===
In:

No.	Pos.	Nation	Player
5	DF	DEN	Jacob Barrett Laursen (from Odense)
6	DF	NED	Mike van der Hoorn (from Swansea City)
7	MF	AUT	Christian Gebauer (from SCR Altach)
8	MF	JPN	Ritsu Doan (on loan from PSV)
15	DF	BEL	Nathan de Medina (from Mouscron)
18	FW	VEN	Sergio Córdova (on loan from FC Augsburg)
22	FW	GER	Noel Niemann (from 1860 Munich)

Out:

No.	Pos.	Nation	Player
7	MF	GER	Patrick Weihrauch (to Dynamo Dresden)
8	DF	GER	Florian Hartherz (to Fortuna Düsseldorf)
11	DF	GER	Stephan Salger (to 1860 Munich)
24	DF	ESP	Álex Pérez (to Logroñés)
25	DF	FRA	Jonathan Clauss (to Lens)
31	GK	HUN	Ágoston Kiss (loan return to Haladás)
32	MF	GER	Keanu Staude (to Würzburger Kickers)
40	GK	GER	Philipp Klewin (to Erzgebirge Aue)
—	FW	GER	Mervin Kalac (on loan to SV Lippstadt 08)

=== VfB Stuttgart ===
In:

No.	Pos.	Nation	Player
1	GK	SUI	Gregor Kobel (from 1899 Hoffenheim, previously on loan)
2	DF	GER	Waldemar Anton (from Hannover 96)
3	MF	JPN	Wataru Endo (from Sint-Truiden, previously on loan)
5	DF	GRE	Konstantinos Mavropanos (on loan from Arsenal, previously on loan at 1. FC Nürnberg)
15	DF	GER	Pascal Stenzel (from SC Freiburg, previously on loan)
29	FW	FRA	Momo Cissé (from Le Havre)

Out:

No.	Pos.	Nation	Player
5	DF	ENG	Nathaniel Phillips (loan return to Liverpool)
27	FW	GER	Mario Gómez (retired)
—	DF	ESP	Pablo Maffeo (on loan to Huesca, previously on loan at Girona)
—	MF	DEN	Nikolas Nartey (on loan to SV Sandhausen, previously on loan at Hansa Rostock)
—	MF	POL	David Kopacz (to Würzburger Kickers, previously on loan at Górnik Zabrze)
—	MF	COD	Chadrac Akolo (to Amiens, previously on loan)
—	FW	GRE	Anastasios Donis (to Reims, previously on loan)

== 2. Bundesliga ==
=== Fortuna Düsseldorf ===
In:

No.	Pos.	Nation	Player
4	DF	AUT	Kevin Danso (on loan from FC Augsburg, previously on loan at Southampton)
7	DF	GER	Florian Hartherz (from Arminia Bielefeld)
8	MF	POL	Jakub Piotrowski (from Genk, previously on loan at Waasland-Beveren)
15	MF	GER	Edgar Prib (from Hannover 96)
20	FW	AUS	Brandon Borrello (on loan from SC Freiburg)

Out:

No.	Pos.	Nation	Player
4	DF	GHA	Kasim Adams (loan return to 1899 Hoffenheim)
5	DF	TUR	Kaan Ayhan (to Sassuolo)
8	MF	GER	Aymen Barkok (loan return to Eintracht Frankfurt)
10	MF	KOS	Valon Berisha (loan return to Lazio)
12	GK	GER	Jannick Theißen (to Schalke 04 II)
15	MF	GER	Erik Thommy (loan return to VfB Stuttgart)
19	DF	DEN	Zanka (loan return to Fenerbahçe)
20	FW	GER	Steven Skrzybski (loan return to Schalke 04)
23	DF	GER	Niko Gießelmann (to Union Berlin)
24	GK	USA	Zack Steffen (loan return to Manchester City)
26	DF	GER	Diego Contento (to SV Sandhausen)
29	DF	AUT	Markus Suttner (to Austria Wien)
32	DF	GER	Robin Bormuth (to Karlsruher SC)
37	FW	GHA	Bernard Tekpetey (loan return to Schalke 04)

=== SC Paderborn ===
In:

No.	Pos.	Nation	Player
1	GK	GER	Moritz Schulze (from RB Leipzig youth)
3	DF	GER	Frederic Ananou (from FC Ingolstadt)
10	MF	GER	Julian Justvan (from VfL Wolfsburg)
20	MF	GER	Pascal Steinwender (from VfB Oldenburg)
23	MF	GER	Maximilian Thalhammer (from FC Ingolstadt)
25	DF	POR	Marcel Correia (from Jahn Regensburg)
27	MF	GER	Chris Führich (on loan from Borussia Dortmund II)
31	MF	SWE	Svante Ingelsson (on loan from Udinese, previously on loan at Kalmar FF)
36	DF	ENG	Chima Okoroji (on loan from SC Freiburg, previously on loan at Jahn Regensburg)

Out:

No.	Pos.	Nation	Player
4	DF	GER	Jan-Luca Rumpf (to Fortuna Köln)
7	MF	GER	Marlon Ritter (to 1. FC Kaiserslautern)
8	MF	ALB	Klaus Gjasula (to Hamburger SV)
15	DF	GER	Luca Kilian (to Mainz 05)
20	DF	LUX	Laurent Jans (loan return to Metz)
24	MF	BIH	Rifet Kapić (on loan to Sheriff Tiraspol)
25	DF	TUN	Mohamed Dräger (loan return to SC Freiburg)
31	FW	GER	Ben Zolinski (to Erzgebirge Aue)
38	FW	GER	Gerrit Holtmann (loan return to Mainz 05)
—	MF	GER	Marcel Hilßner (to Coventry City, previously on loan at Hallescher FC)
—	MF	GER	Felix Drinkuth (to FSV Zwickau, previously on loan at Hallescher FC)

=== 1. FC Heidenheim ===
In:

No.	Pos.	Nation	Player
3	MF	GER	Jan Schöppner (from SC Verl)
8	MF	GER	Andreas Geipl (from Jahn Regensburg)
17	MF	GER	Florian Pick (from 1. FC Kaiserslautern)
18	DF	GER	Marvin Rittmüller (from 1. FC Köln II)
20	MF	GER	Dženis Burnić (from Borussia Dortmund, previously on loan at Dynamo Dresden)
24	FW	GER	Christian Kühlwetter (from 1. FC Kaiserslautern)

Out:

No.	Pos.	Nation	Player
10	FW	GER	Tim Kleindienst (to Gent)
17	MF	GER	Maurice Multhaup (to VfL Osnabrück)
18	MF	GER	Sebastian Griesbeck (to Union Berlin)
28	DF	GER	Arne Feick (to Würzburger Kickers)
29	DF	GER	Robert Strauß (retired)
31	DF	GER	Jonas Brändle (on loan to Sonnenhof Großaspach)
33	DF	GER	Timo Beermann (to VfL Osnabrück)
35	MF	GHA	Andrew Owusu (to Sonnenhof Großaspach)
36	MF	GER	Niklas Dorsch (to Gent)

=== Hamburger SV ===
In:

No.	Pos.	Nation	Player
3	DF	GER	Moritz Heyer (from VfL Osnabrück)
9	FW	GER	Simon Terodde (from 1. FC Köln)
20	MF	ALB	Klaus Gjasula (from SC Paderborn)
24	MF	BEL	Amadou Onana (from 1899 Hoffenheim youth)
37	DF	GER	Toni Leistner (from QPR, previously on loan at 1. FC Köln)

Out:

No.	Pos.	Nation	Player
13	MF	GER	Christoph Moritz (to Jahn Regensburg)
15	DF	GER	Jordan Beyer (loan return to Borussia Mönchengladbach)
19	FW	FIN	Joel Pohjanpalo (loan return to Bayer Leverkusen)
20	MF	AUT	Louis Schaub (loan return to 1. FC Köln)
22	FW	AUT	Martin Harnik (loan return to Werder Bremen)
25	DF	NED	Timo Letschert (to AZ Alkmaar)
29	MF	GER	Adrian Fein (loan return to Bayern Munich)
33	GK	GER	Julian Pollersbeck (to Lyon)
—	DF	SCO	David Bates (on loan to Cercle Brugge, previously on loan at Sheffield Wednesday)
—	MF	TUR	Berkay Özcan (to İstanbul Başakşehir, previously on loan)

=== Darmstadt 98 ===
In:

No.	Pos.	Nation	Player
17	DF	GER	Lars Lukas Mai (on loan from Bayern Munich)
22	FW	GER	Aaron Seydel (from Mainz 05, previously on loan at Jahn Regensburg)
23	DF	GER	Nicolai Rapp (loan extension from Union Berlin)
30	MF	POL	Adrian Stanilewicz (from Bayer Leverkusen)

Out:

No.	Pos.	Nation	Player
3	DF	GER	Sebastian Hertner (to VfB Lübeck)
9	FW	GER	Johannes Wurtz (to Wehen Wiesbaden)
22	FW	SRB	Ognjen Ožegović (to Adanaspor)
25	MF	GER	Yannick Stark (to Dynamo Dresden)
34	MF	GER	Leon Müller (on loan to TuS Rot-Weiß Koblenz)
35	DF	BIH	Dario Đumić (loan return to FC Utrecht)
38	GK	GER	Carl Leonhard (to 1. FC Kaiserslautern II)

=== Hannover 96 ===
In:

No.	Pos.	Nation	Player
3	DF	SWE	Niklas Hult (from AEK Athens)
5	DF	GUI	Simon Falette (from Eintracht Frankfurt, previously on loan at Fenerbahçe)
6	MF	SLO	Jaka Bijol (on loan from CSKA Moscow)
7	FW	GHA	Patrick Twumasi (from Alavés, previously on loan at Gaziantep)
8	MF	GER	Mike Frantz (from SC Freiburg)
18	FW	CMR	Franck Evina (from Bayern Munich II, previously on loan at KFC Uerdingen)
19	FW	KOS	Valmir Sulejmani (from Waldhof Mannheim)
21	DF	JPN	Sei Muroya (from FC Tokyo)
23	DF	TUR	Barış Başdaş (from Fatih Karagümrük)
27	MF	GHA	Kingsley Schindler (on loan from 1. FC Köln)
31	GK	GER	Michael Esser (from 1899 Hoffenheim)

Out:

No.	Pos.	Nation	Player
1	GK	GER	Ron-Robert Zieler (on loan to 1. FC Köln)
5	DF	BRA	Felipe (to Boluspor)
6	MF	GER	Marvin Bakalorz (to Denizlispor)
7	MF	GER	Edgar Prib (to Fortuna Düsseldorf)
9	FW	SWE	John Guidetti (loan return to Alavés)
16	FW	USA	Sebastian Soto (to Norwich City)
18	MF	GER	Marc Stendera (to FC Ingolstadt)
21	DF	GER	Jannes Horn (loan return to 1. FC Köln)
24	DF	GER	Sebastian Jung (to Karlsruher SC)
31	DF	GER	Waldemar Anton (to VfB Stuttgart)
33	FW	GER	Cedric Teuchert (loan return to Schalke 04)
40	FW	GER	Marco Stefandl (to Atlas Delmenhorst)
—	FW	SWE	Emil Hansson (to Fortuna Sittard, previously on loan at RKC Waalwijk)
–	MF	GER	Tim Walbrecht (on loan to Wehen Wiesbaden)

=== Erzgebirge Aue ===
In:

No.	Pos.	Nation	Player
2	DF	FRA	Gaëtan Bussmann (from Guingamp)
6	DF	GER	Florian Ballas (from Dynamo Dresden)
25	GK	GER	Philipp Klewin (from Arminia Bielefeld)
31	FW	GER	Ben Zolinski (from SC Paderborn)
33	MF	BIH	Ognjen Gnjatić (from Korona Kielce)
34	GK	GER	Kevin Harr (from Hamburger SV II)

Out:

No.	Pos.	Nation	Player
2	DF	DEN	Jacob Rasmussen (loan return to Fiorentina)
3	DF	BIH	Marko Mihojević (loan return to PAOK)
15	DF	GER	Dennis Kempe (to Wehen Wiesbaden)
23	MF	GER	Nicolás Sessa (to 1. FC Kaiserslautern)
25	MF	AUT	Dominik Wydra (to Eintracht Braunschweig)
27	FW	SRB	Njegoš Kupusović (loan return to Red Star Belgrade)
33	FW	GER	Christoph Daferner (loan return to SC Freiburg)
34	GK	GER	Daniel Haas (retired)
40	GK	GER	Robert Jendrusch (to FC Ingolstadt)
—	DF	GER	Robert Herrmann (to Würzburger Kickers, previously on loan)
—	MF	GER	Paul Horschig (to VfB Auerbach, previously on loan)

=== VfL Bochum ===
In:

No.	Pos.	Nation	Player
4	DF	SRB	Erhan Mašović (from Club Brugge)
11	DF	UGA	Herbert Bockhorn (from Huddersfield Town)
13	MF	GHA	Raman Chibsah (from Gaziantep)
15	FW	HUN	Soma Novothny (from Újpest FC)
19	FW	GER	Tarsis Bonga (from Chemnitzer FC)
21	FW	GER	Gerrit Holtmann (from Mainz 05, previously on loan at SC Paderborn)
24	DF	GRE	Vasilis Lampropoulos (from Deportivo La Coruña, previously on loan)
30	FW	AZE	Baris Ekincier (loan return from SK Austria Klagenfurt)

Out:

No.	Pos.	Nation	Player
4	DF	GER	Simon Lorenz (to Holstein Kiel)
6	DF	ENG	Jordi Osei-Tutu (loan return to Arsenal)
15	DF	GER	Maxwell Gyamfi (to Hamburger SV II)
18	FW	GER	Manuel Wintzheimer (loan return to Hamburger SV)
19	DF	GER	Patrick Fabian (retired)
20	MF	GER	Vitaly Janelt (to Brentford F.C.)
21	DF	GER	Stefano Celozzi (released)
28	MF	GER	Ulrich Bapoh (to VfL Osnabrück)
36	MF	GER	Jan Wellers (to Rot-Weiß Oberhausen)
—	DF	AUT	Dominik Baumgartner (to Wolfsberger AC, previously on loan)

=== Greuther Fürth ===
In:

No.	Pos.	Nation	Player
9	FW	DEN	Emil Berggreen (from Twente)
19	FW	NGR	Dickson Abiama (from SC Eltersdorf)
24	MF	GER	Anton Stach (from VfL Wolfsburg II)
32	DF	FRA	Abdourahmane Barry (from Liefering)

Out:

No.	Pos.	Nation	Player
3	DF	GER	Maximilian Wittek (to Vitesse)
10	FW	GER	Daniel Keita-Ruel (to SV Sandhausen)
13	DF	GER	Marco Caligiuri (retired)
22	DF	SWE	Felix Beijmo (loan return to Werder Bremen)
24	DF	GER	Maximilian Sauer (to MSV Duisburg)
36	DF	GER	Alexander Lungwitz (on loan to Bayern Munich II)
—	MF	GER	Patrick Sontheimer (to Würzburger Kickers, previously on loan)

=== SV Sandhausen ===
In:

No.	Pos.	Nation	Player
3	DF	GER	Diego Contento (from Fortuna Düsseldorf)
9	FW	GER	Daniel Keita-Ruel (from Greuther Fürth)
19	MF	DEN	Nikolas Nartey (on loan from VfB Stuttgart, previously on loan at Hansa Rostock)
23	DF	GER	Nils Röseler (from VVV-Venlo)
37	MF	MAR	Anas Ouahim (from VfL Osnabrück)

Out:

No.	Pos.	Nation	Player
4	DF	NED	Jesper Verlaat (to Waldhof Mannheim)
19	DF	KOS	Leart Paqarada (to FC St. Pauli)
31	MF	AUT	Stefan Kulovits (retired)
39	DF	GER	Roman Hauk (to Astoria Walldorf)

=== Holstein Kiel ===
In:

No.	Pos.	Nation	Player
3	DF	GER	Marco Komenda (from SV Meppen)
6	MF	GER	Ahmet Arslan (from VfB Lübeck)
19	DF	GER	Simon Lorenz (from VfL Bochum)
21	GK	GER	Thomas Dähne (from Wisła Płock)
31	MF	GER	Fin Bartels (from Werder Bremen)
36	MF	GER	Niklas Hauptmann (on loan from 1. FC Köln)

Out:

No.	Pos.	Nation	Player
1	GK	GER	Timon Weiner (on loan to 1. FC Magdeburg)
2	DF	KOR	Seo Young-jae (to Daejeon Hana Citizen)
3	DF	GER	Dominik Schmidt (to MSV Duisburg)
6	DF	BIH	Darko Todorović (loan return to Red Bull Salzburg)
9	FW	TUN	Salim Khelifi (loan return to Zürich)
13	MF	GER	Salih Özcan (loan return to 1. FC Köln)
14	MF	GER	Michael Eberwein (to Hallescher FC)
16	MF	GER	Philipp Sander (on loan to SC Verl)
19	FW	GER	Emmanuel Iyoha (loan return to Fortuna Düsseldorf)
29	DF	GER	Tobias Fleckstein (to MSV Duisburg)

=== Jahn Regensburg ===
In:

No.	Pos.	Nation	Player
4	DF	GER	Jan-Niklas Beste (on loan from Werder Bremen, previously on loan at Emmen)
10	FW	GER	Kaan Caliskaner (from 1. FC Köln II)
18	MF	GER	Christoph Moritz (from Hamburger SV)
24	DF	CAN	Scott Kennedy (from Austria Klagenfurt)
29	FW	GER	André Becker (from Astoria Walldorf)
33	DF	SUI	Jan Elvedi (from Kriens)

Out:

No.	Pos.	Nation	Player
8	MF	GER	Andreas Geipl (to 1. FC Heidenheim)
10	FW	GER	Julian Derstroff (to Hallescher FC)
14	DF	POR	Marcel Correia (to SC Paderborn)
15	FW	GER	Marco Grüttner (to SGV Freiberg)
18	MF	GER	Marc Lais (to Wehen Wiesbaden)
24	FW	GER	Aaron Seydel (loan return to Mainz 05)
34	DF	GER	Tim Knipping (to Dynamo Dresden)
36	DF	ENG	Chima Okoroji (loan return to SC Freiburg)
—	MF	GER	Kevin Hoffmann (to VfR Aalen, previously on loan)

=== VfL Osnabrück ===
In:

No.	Pos.	Nation	Player
1	GK	GER	Moritz Nicolas (on loan from Borussia Mönchengladbach, previously on loan at Union Berlin)
9	FW	VEN	Christian Santos (from Deportivo La Coruña)
13	DF	GER	Ken Reichel (from Union Berlin)
16	MF	GER	Ulrich Bapoh (from VfL Bochum)
27	FW	GER	Luc Ihorst (on loan from Werder Bremen II)
30	MF	GER	Maurice Multhaup (from 1. FC Heidenheim)
33	DF	GER	Timo Beermann (from 1. FC Heidenheim)
37	MF	GER	Sebastian Kerk (from 1. FC Nürnberg)

Out:

No.	Pos.	Nation	Player
1	GK	GER	Nils Körber (loan return to Hertha BSC)
2	MF	GER	Manuel Farrona-Pulido (to Hansa Rostock)
6	DF	GER	Moritz Heyer (to Hamburger SV)
9	FW	GER	Marcos Álvarez (to Cracovia)
10	MF	MAR	Anas Ouahim (to SV Sandhausen)
11	FW	GAM	Assan Ceesay (loan return to Zürich)
13	DF	NED	Joost van Aken (loan return to Sheffield Wednesday)
27	DF	GER	Felix Agu (to Werder Bremen)
30	FW	GER	Benjamin Girth (loan return to Holstein Kiel)
34	FW	GER	Hakim Traoré (on loan to VfB Oldenburg)

=== FC St. Pauli ===
In:

No.	Pos.	Nation	Player
1	GK	GER	Dennis Smarsch (from Hertha BSC)
3	DF	WAL	James Lawrence (from Anderlecht, previously on loan)
8	MF	URU	Rodrigo Zalazar (on loan from Eintracht Frankfurt, previously on loan at Korona Kielce)
9	FW	AUT	Guido Burgstaller (from Schalke 04)
11	MF	GER	Maximilian Dittgen (from Wehen Wiesbaden)
13	MF	GER	Lukas Daschner (from MSV Duisburg)
14	MF	NGR	Aremu Afeez (from Start)
16	FW	DEN	Simon Makienok (from Dynamo Dresden)
17	FW	GER	Daniel-Kofi Kyereh (from Wehen Wiesbaden)
23	DF	KOS	Leart Paqarada (from SV Sandhausen)

Out:

No.	Pos.	Nation	Player
2	DF	POL	Jakub Bednarczyk (on loan to Zagłębie Lubin)
3	DF	NOR	Leo Østigård (loan return to Brighton & Hove Albion)
8	DF	GER	Marc Hornschuh (to Hamburger SV II)
9	FW	SWE	Viktor Gyökeres (loan return to Brighton & Hove Albion)
17	DF	ENG	Matt Penney (loan return to Sheffield Wednesday)
18	FW	GRE	Dimitrios Diamantakos (to Hajduk Split)
20	DF	KOR	Park Yi-young (on loan to Türkgücü München)
22	MF	GER	Maximilian Franzke (on loan to 1. FC Magdeburg)
23	MF	GER	Johannes Flum (to SC Freiburg II)
25	FW	NED	Henk Veerman (to Heerenveen)
27	DF	GER	Jan-Philipp Kalla (to Victoria Hamburg)
28	MF	POL	Waldemar Sobota (to Śląsk Wrocław)
31	MF	GER	Ersin Zehir (on loan to VfB Lübeck)
32	MF	GER	Christian Conteh (to Feyenoord)
38	DF	GER	Florian Carstens (on loan to Wehen Wiesbaden)

=== Karlsruher SC ===
In:

No.	Pos.	Nation	Player
1	GK	AUT	Markus Kuster (from SV Mattersburg)
2	DF	GER	Sebastian Jung (from Hannover 96)
16	DF	GER	Philip Heise (on loan from Norwich City, previously on loan at 1. FC Nürnberg)
26	MF	GER	Jérôme Gondorf (from SC Freiburg, previously on loan)
32	DF	GER	Robin Bormuth (from Fortuna Düsseldorf)
39	MF	GER	Benjamin Goller (on loan from Werder Bremen)

Out:

No.	Pos.	Nation	Player
1	GK	GER	Benjamin Uphoff (to SC Freiburg)
2	DF	TUR	Burak Çamoğlu (to Hatayspor)
6	DF	GER	Damian Roßbach (to Hansa Rostock)
11	FW	GER	Martin Röser (to VfB Lübeck)
18	MF	GER	Justin Möbius (to Preußen Münster)
27	MF	AUT	Lukas Grozurek (loan return to Sturm Graz)
28	GK	GER	Sven Müller (to Hallescher FC)
29	GK	AUT	Mario Schragl (to Sonnenhof Großaspach)
30	FW	GER	Anton Fink (to SSV Ulm)
—	FW	GER	Marvin Pourié (on loan to 1. FC Kaiserslautern, previously on loan at Eintracht Braunschweig)
—	MF	GER	Tim Kircher (to VfB Lübeck, previously on loan at Carl Zeiss Jena)

=== 1. FC Nürnberg ===
In:

No.	Pos.	Nation	Player
8	MF	NZL	Sarpreet Singh (on loan from Bayern Munich)
9	FW	GER	Manuel Schäffler (from Wehen Wiesbaden)
13	DF	GER	Pius Krätschmer (from Schweinfurt 05)
14	MF	GER	Tom Krauß (on loan from RB Leipzig)
20	FW	GER	Pascal Köpke (from Hertha BSC)
29	GK	GER	Christian Früchtl (on loan from Bayern Munich)

Out:

No.	Pos.	Nation	Player
3	DF	GRE	Konstantinos Mavropanos (loan return to Arsenal)
9	FW	SWE	Mikael Ishak (to Lech Poznań)
10	MF	GER	Sebastian Kerk (to VfL Osnabrück)
14	FW	SUI	Michael Frey (loan return to Fenerbahçe)
16	MF	SLO	Adam Gnezda Čerin (on loan to Rijeka)
19	DF	GER	Philip Heise (loan return to Norwich City)
21	GK	GER	Felix Dornebusch (to Eintracht Braunschweig)
29	MF	GER	Patrick Erras (to Werder Bremen)
40	MF	POR	Iuri Medeiros (on loan to Braga)
—	MF	CZE	Ondřej Petrák (to Slovan Bratislava, previously on loan at Dynamo Dresden)
—	FW	GER	Törles Knöll (to Slaven Belupo, previously on loan at Wehen Wiesbaden)

=== Würzburger Kickers ===
In:

No.	Pos.	Nation	Player
1	GK	GER	Fabian Giefer (from FC Augsburg)
6	DF	GER	Tobias Kraulich (from 1. FC Nürnberg II)
7	FW	SLO	Mitja Lotrič (from Celje)
8	FW	BUL	Vladimir Nikolov (from Septemvri Sofia)
10	MF	GER	Keanu Staude (from Arminia Bielefeld)
12	MF	GER	Patrick Sontheimer (from Greuther Fürth, previously on loan)
19	DF	NED	Douglas (free agent)
23	MF	AUT	Florian Flecker (from Union Berlin)
27	MF	COD	Nzuzi Toko (from Göteborg)
28	DF	GER	Arne Feick (from 1. FC Heidenheim)
29	MF	POL	David Kopacz (from VfB Stuttgart, previously on loan at Górnik Zabrze)
38	DF	GER	Robert Herrmann (from Erzgebirge Aue, previously on loan)
39	GK	GER	Hendrik Bonmann (from 1860 Munich)

Out:

No.	Pos.	Nation	Player
1	GK	GER	Leon Bätge (to VSG Altglienicke)
6	MF	POL	Niklas Zulciak (to FC Concordia 03)
7	MF	GER	Fabio Kaufmann (to Eintracht Braunschweig)
8	MF	GER	Dave Gnaase (to KFC Uerdingen)
10	MF	KOS	Albion Vrenezi (loan return to SSV Jahn Regensburg)
13	DF	GER	Kevin Frisorger (to Pirmasens)
17	MF	GER	Jonas David (loan return to Hamburger SV)
18	FW	GER	Maximilian Breunig (on loan to Admira Wacker)
19	MF	GER	Yassin Ibrahim (to SV Rödinghausen)
23	DF	GER	Johannes Kraus (to FC 08 Homburg)
24	GK	GER	Nico Stephan (to 1. FC Geesdorf)
27	DF	GER	Sebastian Schuppan (retired)
30	MF	GER	Simon Rhein (loan return to 1. FC Nürnberg)
31	FW	GER	Dominik Widemann (to Sonnenhof Großaspach)
40	GK	GER	Vincent Müller (to PSV Eindhoven)

=== Eintracht Braunschweig ===
In:

No.	Pos.	Nation	Player
4	MF	GER	Jannis Nikolaou (from Dynamo Dresden)
6	MF	AUT	Dominik Wydra (from Erzgebirge Aue)
8	MF	GER	Iba May (from VfL Wolfsburg II)
9	FW	SRB	Njegoš Kupusović (from Red Star Belgrade, previously on loan at Erzgebirge Aue)
12	GK	GER	Felix Dornebusch (from 1. FC Nürnberg)
14	DF	GER	Nico Klaß (from Rot-Weiß Oberhausen)
18	MF	GER	Felix Kroos (from Union Berlin)
20	FW	NGR	Suleiman Abdullahi (on loan from Union Berlin)
28	MF	FRA	Yassin Ben Balla (from MSV Duisburg)
32	DF	GER	Michael Schultz (from Waldhof Mannheim)
37	MF	GER	Fabio Kaufmann (from Würzburger Kickers)

Out:

No.	Pos.	Nation	Player
6	DF	GER	Steffen Nkansah (to FSV Zwickau)
7	MF	GER	Bernd Nehrig (to Viktoria Berlin)
8	MF	GER	Stephan Fürstner (to Mainz 05 II)
9	FW	SUI	Orhan Ademi (to MSV Duisburg)
12	GK	RUS	Roman Birjukov (to Lüneburger SK Hansa)
14	DF	GER	Robin Becker (to Dynamo Dresden)
20	MF	GER	Merveille Biankadi (loan return to 1. FC Heidenheim)
21	GK	GER	Yannik Bangsow (on loan to Viktoria Köln)
24	DF	GER	Kevin Goden (loan return to 1. FC Nürnberg)
29	DF	GER	Alfons Amade (loan return to 1899 Hoffenheim II)
30	FW	GER	Marvin Pourié (loan return to Karlsruher SC)
31	MF	GER	Marc Pfitzner (retired)
34	FW	GER	Mike Feigenspan (to KFC Uerdingen)
—	DF	GER	Nick Otto (to SSV Jeddeloh, previously on loan)

== See also ==
- 2020–21 Bundesliga
- 2020–21 2. Bundesliga
