= 2020–21 Eintracht Braunschweig season =

Eintracht Braunschweig
2020–21 season
- Chairman: Sebastian Ebel
- Coach: Marco Antwerpen
- Stadium: Eintracht-Stadion
- 2. Bundesliga: 15th
- DFB-Pokal: Second round
- Top goalscorer: League: All: Martin Kobylański (3)
Home colours	Away colours	Third colours
- All statistics correct as of 22 December 2020.

The 2020–21 Eintracht Braunschweig season is the club's 127th season in existence and its first season back in the second flight of German football. In addition to the domestic league, Eintracht Braunschweig participated in this season's edition of the DFB-Pokal. The season covers the period from 1 July 2020 to 30 June 2021.

== Players ==
=== First-team squad ===
As of 1 September 2020

Note: Flags indicate national team as defined under FIFA eligibility rules; some limited exceptions apply. Players may hold more than one non-FIFA nationality.

No.	Pos.	Nation	Player
1	GK	GER	Marcel Engelhardt
3	DF	GER	Lasse Schlüter
4	MF	GER	Jannis Nikolaou
5	DF	GER	Benjamin Kessel
6	DF	AUT	Dominik Wydra
7	MF	GER	Bernd Nehrig
8	MF	GER	Iba May
10	MF	POL	Martin Kobylanski
11	FW	GER	Leandro Putaro
12	GK	GER	Felix Dornebusch
14	DF	GER	Nico Klaß
15	FW	GER	Marcel Bär
16	GK	BIH	Jasmin Fejzić
17	FW	GER	Yari Otto

No.	Pos.	Nation	Player
19	DF	GER	Felix Burmeister (captain)
20	FW	NGR	Suleiman Abdullahi (on loan from Union Berlin)
21	GK	GER	Yannik Bangsow
22	FW	GER	Manuel Schwenk
23	MF	GER	Danilo Wiebe
27	DF	GER	Niko Kijewski
28	MF	FRA	Yassin Ben Balla
32	DF	GER	Michael Schultz
33	FW	GER	Nick Proschwitz
37	MF	GER	Fabio Kaufmann
38	MF	GER	Leon Bürger
39	MF	GER	Patrick Kammerbauer (on loan from Freiburg)
40	DF	GER	Robin Ziegele

== Transfers ==
=== In ===
No.	Pos.	Nation	Player
4	MF	GER	Jannis Nikolaou (from Dynamo Dresden)
6	MF	AUT	Dominik Wydra (from Erzgebirge Aue)
14	DF	GER	Nico Klaß (from Rot-Weiß Oberhausen)
32	DF	GER	Michael Schultz (from Waldhof Mannheim)
—	MF	FRA	Yassin Ben Balla (from MSV Duisburg)
—	MF	GER	Fabio Kaufmann (from Würzburger Kickers)

=== Out ===
No.	Pos.	Nation	Player
8	MF	GER	Stephan Fürstner (to Mainz 05 II)
12	GK	RUS	Roman Birjukov (to Lüneburger SK Hansa)
14	DF	GER	Robin Becker (to Dynamo Dresden)
20	MF	GER	Merveille Biankadi (loan return to 1. FC Heidenheim)
24	DF	GER	Kevin Goden (loan return to 1. FC Nürnberg)
29	DF	GER	Alfons Amade (loan return to 1899 Hoffenheim II)
30	FW	GER	Marvin Pourié (loan return to Karlsruher SC)

== Pre-season and friendlies ==
Win Draw Loss Fixtures

9 August 2020 Friendly	Werder Bremen	2–0	Eintracht Braunschweig	Bremen, Germany
13:00 CEST (UTC+2)	Augustinsson 15'; Klaassen 21'	Report		Stadium: Weserstadion Platz 11; Attendance: 0

15 August 2020 Friendly	VfL Wolfsburg	0–1	Eintracht Braunschweig	Wolfsburg, Germany
11:00 CEST (UTC+2)		Report	Bär 46'	Stadium: AOK Stadion; Attendance: 0 Referee: Harm Osmers

21 August 2020 Friendly	Eintracht Braunschweig	1–0	Dynamo Dresden	Münster, Germany
15:30 CEST (UTC+2)	Klaß 58'	Report		Stadium: Preußenstadion; Attendance: 0

25 August 2020 Friendly	Hertha BSC	Cancelled	Eintracht Braunschweig	Berlin, Germany
16:00 CEST (UTC+2)				Stadium: Olympiastadion

29 August 2020 Friendly	Eintracht Braunschweig	0–1	Hansa Rostock	Braunschweig, Germany
15:00 CEST (UTC+2)		Report	Verhoek 42'	Stadium: Eintracht-Stadion; Attendance: 390

4 September 2020 Friendly	Eintracht Braunschweig	0–1	(Netherlands) De Graafschap	Braunschweig, Germany
14:15 CEST (UTC+2)		Report	Dekker 35'	Stadium: Eintracht-Stadion

5 September 2020 Friendly	Eintracht Braunschweig	2–0	(Netherlands) Heracles Almelo	Lotte, Germany
14:30 CEST (UTC+2)	Nikolaou 32'; Schultz 64'	Report		Stadium: Stadion am Lotter Kreuz; Attendance: 0

12 September 2020 Friendly	Hallescher FC	1–3	Eintracht Braunschweig	Halle, Germany
14:00 CEST (UTC+2)				Stadium: Erdgas Sportpark

25 March 2021 Friendly	Union Berlin	1–2	Eintracht Braunschweig	Berlin, Germany
15:00 CET (UTC+1)	Bülter 74'	Report	Abdullahi 19', 37'	Stadium: Stadion An der Alten Försterei; Attendance: 0

== Competitions ==
=== Overview ===
Competition	First match	Last match	Starting round	Final position	Record							
Competition	First match	Last match	Starting round	Final position	Pld	W	D	L	GF	GA	GD	Win %
2. Bundesliga	18 September 2020	23 May 2021	Matchday 1		13	3	3	7	13	29	−16	23.08
DFB-Pokal	11 September 2020	22 December 2020	First round	Second round	2	1	0	1	5	6	−1	50.00
Total					15	4	3	8	18	35	−17	26.67

Last updated: 22 December 2020
Source: Soccerway

=== 2. Bundesliga ===
==== League table ====
Pos	Team	Pld	W	D	L	GF	GA	GD	Pts	Qualification or relegation
14	Jahn Regensburg	34	9	11	14	37	50	−13	38	
15	SV Sandhausen	34	10	4	20	41	60	−19	34	
16	VfL Osnabrück (R)	34	9	6	19	35	58	−23	33	Qualification for relegation play-offs
17	Eintracht Braunschweig (R)	34	7	10	17	30	59	−29	31	Relegation to 3. Liga
18	Würzburger Kickers (R)	34	6	7	21	37	69	−32	25	Relegation to 3. Liga

Source: DFB
Rules for classification: 1) Points; 2) Goal difference; 3) Goals scored; 4) Head-to-head points; 5) Head-to-head goal difference; 6) Head-to-head away goals scored; 7) Away goals scored; 8) Play-off.
(R) Relegated

==== Results summary ====
Overall								Home						Away					
Pld	W	D	L	GF	GA	GD	Pts	W	D	L	GF	GA	GD	W	D	L	GF	GA	GD
34	7	10	17	30	59	−29	31	6	4	7	17	23	−6	1	6	10	13	36	−23

Last updated: 23 May 2021.
Source: Soccerway

==== Results by round ====
Round	1	2	3	4	5	6	7	8	9	10	11	12	13	14	15	16	17	18	19	20	21	22	23	24	25	26	27	28	29	30	31	32	33	34
Ground	A	H	A	H	A	H	A	H	A	H	H	A	H	A	H	A	H	H	A	H	A	H	A	H	A	H	A	A	H	A	H	A	H	A
Result	L	D	L	W	L	W	D	L	L	W	L	D	L	L	D	D	L	W	L	L	L	W	D	W	D	D	L	W	D	L	L	D	L	L
Position	16	15	17	15	17	16	16	16	16	16	16	16	16	16	16	16	17	17	17	17	17	17	17	17	17	17	17	17	17	17	17	17	17	17

Updated to match(es) played on 23 May 2021. Source:
A = Away; H = Home; W = Win; D = Draw; L = Loss

==== Matches ====
The league fixtures were announced on 7 August 2020.

20 September 2020 1	1. FC Heidenheim	2–0	Eintracht Braunschweig	Heidenheim
13:30	Schmidt 17' (pen.); Sessa 75'	Report		Stadium: Voith-Arena; Attendance: 2,052; Referee: Nicolas Winter

26 September 2020 2	Eintracht Braunschweig	0–0	Holstein Kiel	Braunschweig
13:00		Report		Stadium: Eintracht-Stadion; Attendance: 3,512; Referee: Martin Thomsen

3 October 2020 3	Hannover 96	4–1	Eintracht Braunschweig	Hannover
13:00	Maina 54'; Weydandt 71'; Hult 74'; Haraguchi 86'	Report	Kobylański 51'	Stadium: HDI-Arena; Attendance: 7,300; Referee: Daniel Siebert

17 October 2020 4	Eintracht Braunschweig	2–1	VfL Bochum	Braunschweig
13:00	Kaufmann 23'; Proschwitz 67'	Report	Zoller 5'	Stadium: Eintracht-Stadion; Attendance: 3,815; Referee: Christof Günsch

23 October 2020 5	Jahn Regensburg	3–0	Eintracht Braunschweig	Regensburg
18:30	Vrenezi 5', 78'; Besuschkow 61'	Report		Stadium: Jahnstadion Regensburg; Attendance: 0 Referee: Michael Bacher

31 October 2020 6	Eintracht Braunschweig	3–2	1. FC Nürnberg	Braunschweig
13:00	Wiebe 21'; Kobylański 52'; Proschwitz 90+3' (pen.)	Report	Köpke 31', 42'	Stadium: Eintracht-Stadion; Attendance: 2,788; Referee: Sven Waschitzki

6 November 2020 7	Sandhausen	2–2	Eintracht Braunschweig	Sandhausen
18:30 CET	Esswein 3'; Behrens 26'; Diekmeier (yellow card) 58'; Linsmayer (yellow card) 90'	Report	Proschwitz 46'; Kroos (yellow card) 77'; Wydra (yellow card) 90'; Otto 90+2'	Stadium: BWT-Stadion am Hardtwald; Attendance: 0 Referee: (Germany) Patrick Alt
Note: Played Behind Closed Doors

21 November 2020 8	Eintracht Braunschweig	1–3	Karlsruher SC	Braunschweig
13:00 CET	Proschwitz 31'; Wiebe (yellow card) 49'; Otto (yellow card) 83'	Report	Gordon (yellow card) 8'; Ziegele 14' (o.g.); Wanitzek 18' (yellow card) 61'; Choi Kyoung-rok (yellow card) 48' (goal) 63'; Bormuth (yellow card) 53'; Carlson (yellow card) 75'	Stadium: Eintracht-Stadion; Attendance: 0 Referee: (Germany) Patrick Hanslbauer
Note: Played Behind Closed Doors

27 November 2020 9	Darmstadt 98	4–0	Eintracht Braunschweig	Darmstadt
18:30 CET	Kempe 6' (pen.) 36' (pen.); Dursun 7' 33'	Report	Wiebe (yellow card) 15'; Kammerbauer (yellow card) 25'; Schultz (yellow card) 35'; Otto (yellow card) 72'	Stadium: Merck-Stadion am Böllenfalltor; Attendance: 0 Referee: (Germany) Alexander Sather
Note: Played Behind Closed Doors

5 December 2020 10	Eintracht Braunschweig	2–1	FC St Pauli	Braunschweig
13:00 CET	Nikolaou (yellow card) 7'; Wiebe (yellow card) 17'; Kessel (yellow card) 45'; Bär 67'; Kaufmann 82'	Report	Dittgen 2'; Benatelli (yellow card) 75'	Stadium: Eintracht-Stadion; Attendance: 0 Referee: (Germany) Timo Gerach
Note: Played Behind Closed Doors

13 December 2020 11	Eintracht Braunschweig	0–2	Osnabrück	Braunschweig
13:30 CET	Burmeister (yellow card) 44'; Abdullahi (yellow card) 50'	Report	Kerk 3'; Taffertshofer (yellow card) 17'; Reis (yellow card) 40'; Trapp (yellow card) 59'; Multhaup 65'	Stadium: Eintracht-Stadion; Attendance: 0 Referee: (Germany) Martin Thomsen
Note: Played Behind Closed Doors

=== DFB-Pokal ===
11 September 2020 First round	Eintracht Braunschweig	5–4	Hertha BSC	Braunschweig
20:45 CEST (UTC+2)	Kobylański 2', 44', 66'; Mittelstädt 17' (o.g.); Kijewski (yellow card) 34'; Wiebe (yellow card) 69'; Abdullahi 73'	Report	Lukebakio 23', 83'; Cunha 29'; Pekarík 65'	Stadium: Eintracht-Stadion; Attendance: 500; Referee: Tobias Stieler

22 December 2020 Second round	Eintracht Braunschweig	0–2	Borussia Dortmund	Braunschweig
20:00 CET (UTC+1)	Ben Balla (yellow card) 19'; Nikolaou (yellow card) 88'	Report	Hummels 12'; Bellingham (yellow card) 24'; Morey (yellow card) 44'; Sancho 90+2'	Stadium: Eintracht-Stadion; Attendance: 0 Referee: Benjamin Cortus
