= Nils Rütten =

German footballer

Personal information
- Date of birth: 20 July 1995 (age 31)
- Place of birth: Würselen, Germany
- Height: 1.84 m (6 ft 0 in)
- Position: Defensive midfielder

Youth career
- –2003: FC Germania Bauchem
- 2003–2014: Borussia Mönchengladbach

Senior career*
Years	Team	Apps	(Gls)
2014–2018	Borussia Mönchengladbach II	91	(6)
2018–2019	Bonner SC	15	(0)
2019	Eintracht Braunschweig	10	(0)
Total		116	(6)
- * Club domestic league appearances and goals

Nils Rütten (born 20 July 1995) is a German former professional footballer who played as a defensive midfielder.

== Career ==
Rütten made his professional debut for Eintracht Braunschweig in the 3. Liga on 16 February 2019, coming on as a substitute in the 87th minute for Marcel Bär in the 3–1 away win against Fortuna Köln.

He retired at the age of 23 after the 2018–19 season and began studying law at university.
