= Feigenspan =

Feigenspan is a surname of German origin. Notable people with the surname include:

- Christian William Feigenspan (1876–1939), American businessman
- Eckehard Feigenspan (born 1935), German footballer
- Mike Feigenspan (born 1995), German footballer
