= Mike Feigenspan =

German footballer

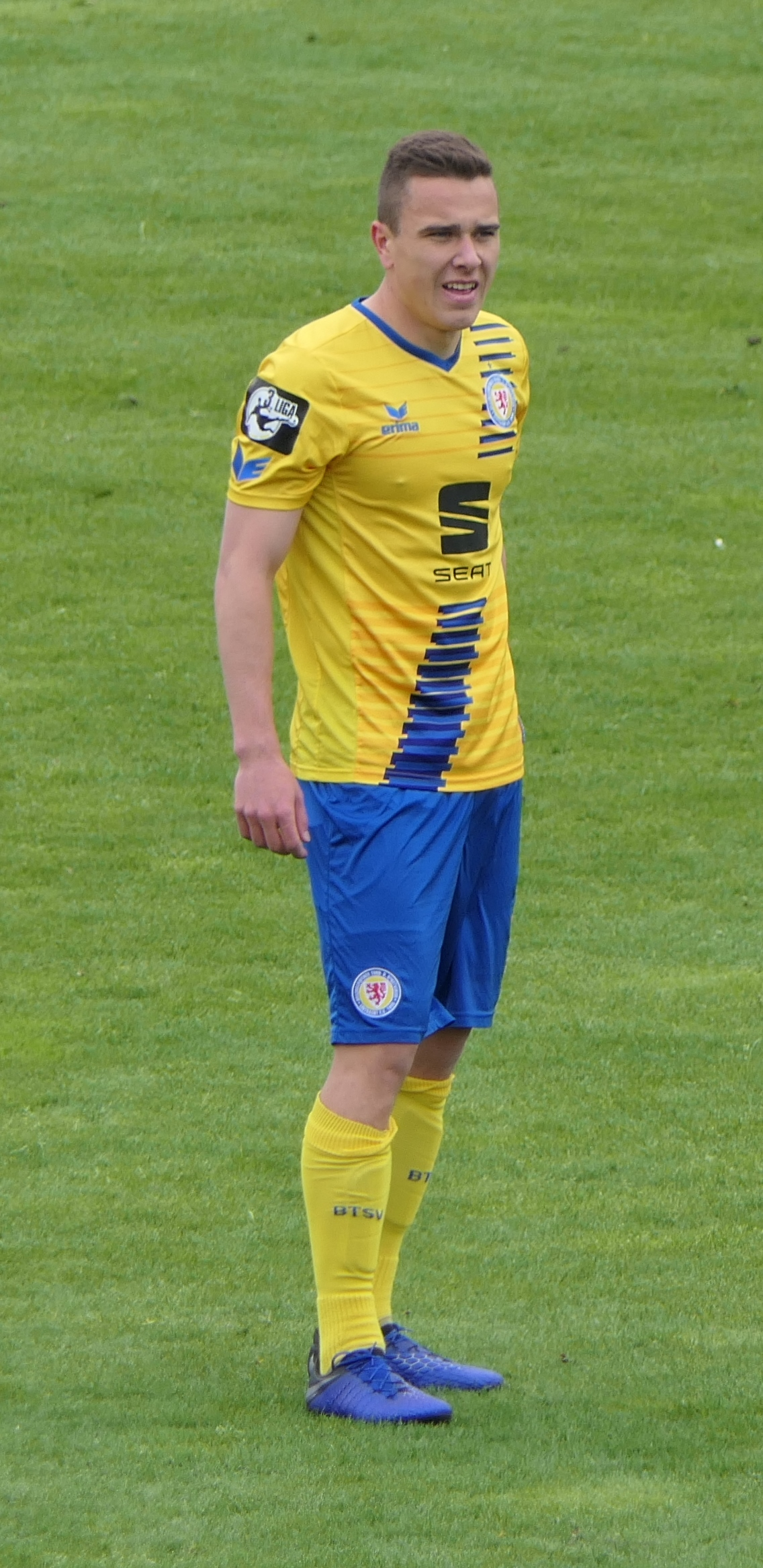
- Feigenspan with Eintracht Braunschweig in 2019

Personal information
- Date of birth: 5 August 1995 (age 31)
- Place of birth: Kassel, Germany
- Height: 1.80 m (5 ft 11 in)
- Position: Winger

Team information
- Current team: SGV Freiberg
- Number: 11

Youth career
- –2013: SC Paderborn
- 2013–2014: OSC Vellmar

Senior career*
Years	Team	Apps	(Gls)
2013–2014	OSC Vellmar II	4	(5)
2014	OSC Vellmar	3	(0)
2014–2016	Hessen Kassel	58	(14)
2014	Hessen Kassel II	8	(6)
2016–2019	Borussia Mönchengladbach II	64	(20)
2019–2020	Eintracht Braunschweig	42	(8)
2020–2021	KFC Uerdingen 05	33	(3)
2021–2022	Hessen Kassel	13	(3)
2022–2023	SV Meppen	19	(1)
2023	Kickers Offenbach	28	(2)
2024–	SGV Freiberg	10	(3)
- * Club domestic league appearances and goals as of 29 April 2024

Mike Feigenspan (born 5 August 1995) is a German professional footballer who plays as a winger for SGV Freiberg.

== Career ==
On 11 January 2019, Feigenspan joined 3. Liga club Eintracht Braunschweig, signing a 1.5-year contract until 30 June 2020 with the option of another season. He made his debut for Braunschweig in the 3. Liga on 27 January 2019, coming on as a substitute in the 74th minute for Leandro Putaro in the home match against Hansa Rostock. Feigenspan scored Braunschweig's second goal of the match with a header in the 88th minute via an assist from Marcel Bär, securing the 2–0 win for the club.

On 31 January 2023, Feigenspan signed with Kickers Offenbach.
