= Nick Proschwitz =

German professional footballer (born 1986)

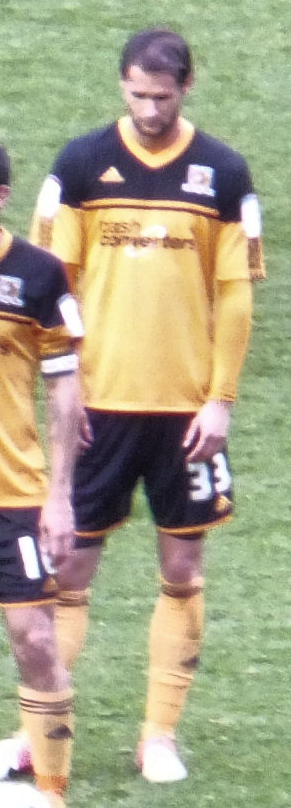
- Proschwitz playing for Hull City in 2012

Personal information
- Full name: Nick Proschwitz
- Date of birth: 28 November 1986 (age 39)
- Place of birth: Weißenfels, East Germany
- Height: 1.92 m (6 ft 4 in)
- Position: Forward

Team information
- Current team: VfB Eppingen (player); 1899 Hoffenheim (U17 coach)

Youth career
- 2003–2004: Greuther Fürth

Senior career*
| Years | Team | Apps | (Gls) |
| 2004–2005 | 1899 Hoffenheim II | 2 | (0) |
| 2005–2006 | Hamburger SV II | 22 | (0) |
| 2007–2008 | VfL Wolfsburg II | 21 | (4) |
| 2008–2009 | Hannover 96 II | 33 | (10) |
| 2009–2010 | Vaduz | 29 | (23) |
| 2010–2011 | Thun | 31 | (8) |
| 2011 | FC Luzern | 0 | (0) |
| 2011–2012 | SC Paderborn | 33 | (17) |
| 2012–2014 | Hull City | 29 | (3) |
| 2014 | → Barnsley (loan) | 14 | (4) |
| 2014–2015 | Brentford | 18 | (1) |
| 2015 | → Coventry City (loan) | 9 | (1) |
| 2015–2016 | SC Paderborn 07 | 19 | (5) |
| 2016–2017 | Sint-Truidense | 30 | (4) |
| 2017–2018 | Sparta Rotterdam | 7 | (3) |
| 2017 | Jong Sparta | 4 | (0) |
| 2018–2019 | SV Meppen | 27 | (14) |
| 2019–2021 | Eintracht Braunschweig | 62 | (12) |
| 2021–2023 | 1899 Hoffenheim II | 58 | (32) |
| 2022–2023 | 1899 Hoffenheim | 1 | (0) |
| 2023– | VfB Eppingen | 5 | (1) |
- * Club domestic league appearances and goals as of 12:21, 19 August 2024 (UTC)

Nick Proschwitz (born 28 November 1986) is a German professional footballer who plays as a forward for VfB Eppingen. He began his career in Germany and Switzerland, before moving to England in 2012 where he spent the next three years.

== Playing career ==
=== Germany ===
Born in Weißenfels, Proschwitz played football as a youth for teams in Michelau, Lichtenfels and Hallstadt, before joining the youth team at Greuther Fürth. He signed a contract for the 2004–05 season with the reserve team of TSG Hoffenheim, before spending the 2005–06 season in the reserve team of Hamburger SV, where he played in the fourth tier. In 2007, he dropped a league to the reserve team of VfL Wolfsburg in the fifth tier where he achieved his first promotion back to the fourth tier, scoring four goals in the process. Following his success in Wolfsburg, however, he opted to switch to league rivals Hannover 96 II, scoring 10 times in 33 games.

=== Switzerland ===
In 2009, he transferred to the Liechtenstein side FC Vaduz, who had been recently relegated back to the Swiss Challenge League, the second highest league in Switzerland. He made his debut on 16 July 2009, and went on to score 23 goals in 29 appearances for the club.

He remained with Vaduz for only a single season. In May 2010, he signed a three-year contract with FC Thun, who had just been promoted to the Swiss Super League, the top tier of Swiss football, the first time he had played in the highest league in a country, scoring eight goals up to April 2011. On 12 April 2011, he made it clear that he wished to leave Thun and move to FC Luzern in the summer transfer window.

=== SC Paderborn ===
He signed a three-year deal with Luzern, a contract which would last until 2014. A change in management at FC Luzern, however, meant that Proschwitz was surplus to requirements, and was immediately transferred out of the club before the season had even kicked off. He returned to Germany, signing with 2. Bundesliga side SC Paderborn. He made his debut on 17 July 2011 against Hansa Rostock, scoring the first goal of the game. He played 35 times for Paderborn in 2011–12, scoring 19 times. Along with Alexander Meier and Olivier Occéan, he was the joint top scorer in division.

Following the 2011–12 season, his future was once again uncertain, with several clubs interested in signing him from Paderborn, including his former youth team SpVgg Greuther Fürth and English Championship side Hull City. On 12 July 2012, it was reported that Proschwitz and his agent had flown out to Hull City's pre-season training camp in Portugal to discuss personal terms with the English club.

=== Hull City ===
On 19 July 2012, he signed for Hull City on a three-year contract for a fee of €3.3 million (£2.6 million). His debut came when Hull defeated Rotherham United on penalties after a 1–1 draw in a League Cup first round tie on 11 August. Proschwitz scored one of the penalties to help ensure Hull City booked their place in the next round of the League Cup. He made his league debut a week later, in the Championship opener at home to Brighton which resulted in a 1–0 win. His first goals for the club came in a 2–1 victory against Ipswich Town on 20 October 2012, in which he scored twice after coming on as a late substitute.

On 5 January 2013, Nick kept his side in the FA Cup in the 3rd Round tie against Leyton Orient with a 90th-minute equaliser, a goal that would become a contender for the club's goal of the season competition.

On 4 May 2013, in the final match of season that would see Hull promoted to the Premier League, Proschwitz scored a vital 58th-minute equaliser against Cardiff City. The goal was his 3rd of the season in the league and his 5th in total. In the same match however, he did see his late penalty saved by David Marshall that, if scored, would have secured victory for the Tigers and consequently promotion; as it was, Cardiff counter-attacked and gained a penalty of their own merely seconds later, which they duly converted to leave the final score at 2–2. There would be another fifteen minutes of anxious waiting by Hull players, staff and fans alike for Watford's (Hull's promotion rivals') loss to Leeds to be confirmed, meaning Proschwitz's penalty miss was not, as it could have been, ultimately significant. He made his Premier League debut as a late substitute in a 1–0 loss to Tottenham Hotspur on 27 October 2013.

On 23 January 2014, Proschwitz signed for Barnsley on loan for the remainder of the 2013–14 season. He made 14 appearances and scored four goals during his loan with Barnsley.

=== Brentford ===
On 7 August 2014, Proschwitz signed for newly promoted Championship side Brentford on a free transfer. He signed an initial one-year contract with an option for a further two years. Lacking fitness, Proschwitz made his Bees debut from the bench on the opening day of the 2014–15 season, coming on for Andre Gray after 67 minutes of a 1–1 draw with Charlton Athletic. He made his first start in the following match against Dagenham & Redbridge in the League Cup first round and scored Brentford's third goal in an incredible 6–6 draw, which was settled on penalties in the Bees' favour. Proschwitz made his first league start for the club in a 2–1 victory over Blackpool on 19 August and scored his first league goal of the season three games later, tapping in Jon Toral's cross to seal a 2–0 win over Rotherham United.

On 27 February 2015, Proschwitz moved to Coventry City on loan until the end of the 2014–15 season. He made 9 appearances for the club, and scored his first and only Sky Blues goal in a 3–1 home defeat to Crewe Alexandra.

He was released by Brentford at the end of the season.

=== Return to SC Paderborn ===
Following his release from Brentford, Proschwitz returned to Germany and SC Paderborn in the summer of 2015. After 5 goals in 19 2. Bundesliga appearances during the first half of the season, he was released on 25 January 2016, after an incident in which he allegedly exposed himself to a woman during a late-night drinking session at SC Paderborn's mid-season training camp.

=== Sint-Truidense ===
Proschwitz signed for Belgian First Division A club Sint-Truidense on 2 February 2016. He scored just 4 goals in 33 appearances for the club, before departing the club at the end of the 2016–17 season.

=== Sparta Rotterdam ===
On 4 September 2017, Proschwitz moved to the Netherlands to join Eredivisie club Sparta Rotterdam on a one-year deal. He finally made his debut on 29 October, coming on as an 85th minute substitute in a 2–1 home win over FC Groningen.

=== SV Meppen ===
In September 2018, Proschwitz joined SV Meppen on trial, and signed for the club on a three-year contract the following month. He scored 14 goals in 27 matches in the 2018–19 3. Liga.

=== Eintracht Braunschweig ===
In May 2019 it was confirmed, that Proschwitz had joined Eintracht Braunschweig on a two-year contract. After winning promotion in 2020 Braunschweig became his second and ultimately last club in the German second division but Eintracht couldn't avoid immediate relegation to the third tier in 2021.

=== Return to Hoffenheim II ===
On 20 August 2021, Proschwitz returned to Regionalliga Südwest club Hoffenheim II. He finished the 2021–22 season as the top scorer in the division and made the first Bundesliga appearance of his career as a substitute in the first team's final match of the season.

=== VfB Eppingen ===
In September 2023, Proschwitz signed a contract with Verbandsliga Nordbaden club VfB Eppingen.

== Coaching career ==
On 1 July 2023, Proschwitz was announced as an U17 coach at Hoffenheim.

== Career statistics ==
Appearances and goals by club, season and competition
| Club | Season | League | | | National cup (Note: Includes DFB-Pokal, FA Cup, Belgian Cup) | | League cup (Note: Includes Football League Cup) | | Other | | Total | |
| Club | Season | Division | Apps | Goals | Apps | Goals | Apps | Goals | Apps | Goals | Apps | Goals |
|---|---|---|---|---|---|---|---|---|---|---|---|---|
| Hamburger SV II | 2005–06 | Regionalliga Nord | 15 | 0 | — | | — | | — | | 15 | 0 |
| Hamburger SV II | 2006–07 | Regionalliga Nord | 7 | 0 | — | | — | | — | | 7 | 0 |
| Hamburger SV II | Total | | 22 | 0 | 0 | 0 | 0 | 0 | 0 | 0 | 22 | 0 |
| VfL Wolfsburg II | 2006–07 | Oberliga Nord | 15 | 12 | — | | — | | — | | 15 | 12 |
| VfL Wolfsburg II | 2007–08 | Regionalliga Nord | 21 | 4 | — | | — | | — | | 21 | 4 |
| VfL Wolfsburg II | Total | | 36 | 16 | 0 | 0 | 0 | 0 | 0 | 0 | 36 | 16 |
| Hannover 96 II | 2008–09 | Regionalliga Nord | 33 | 11 | — | | — | | — | | 33 | 11 |
| FC Vaduz | 2009–10 | Swiss Challenge League | 29 | 23 | | | — | | 4 (Note: Appearance(s) in UEFA Europa League qualification) | 0 | 33 | 23 |
| FC Thun | 2010–11 | Swiss Super League | 31 | 8 | 1 | 0 | — | | — | | 32 | 8 |
| SC Paderborn 07 | 2011–12 | 2. Bundesliga | 33 | 17 | 2 | 2 | — | | — | | 35 | 19 |
| Hull City | 2012–13 | Championship | 27 | 3 | 3 | 2 | 1 | 0 | — | | 31 | 5 |
| Hull City | 2013–14 | Premier League | 2 | 0 | 1 | 1 | 3 | 1 | — | | 6 | 2 |
| Hull City | Total | | 29 | 3 | 4 | 3 | 4 | 1 | 0 | 0 | 37 | 7 |
| Barnsley (loan) | 2013–14 | Championship | 14 | 4 | 0 | 0 | 0 | 0 | — | | 14 | 4 |
| Brentford | 2014–15 | Championship | 18 | 1 | 0 | 0 | 2 | 1 | — | | 20 | 2 |
| Coventry City (loan) | 2014–15 | League One | 9 | 1 | 0 | 0 | 0 | 0 | — | | 9 | 1 |
| SC Paderborn 07 | 2015–16 | 2. Bundesliga | 19 | 5 | 2 | 0 | — | | — | | 21 | 5 |
| Sint-Truidense VV | 2015–16 | Belgian Pro League | 6 | 3 | 0 | 0 | — | | 6 (Note: Appearances in Belgian Pro League Europa League play-offs) | 0 | 12 | 3 |
| Sint-Truidense VV | 2016–17 | Belgian First Division A | 16 | 1 | 3 | 2 | — | | 2 | 0 | 21 | 3 |
| Sint-Truidense VV | Total | | 22 | 4 | 3 | 2 | 0 | 0 | 8 | 0 | 33 | 6 |
| Sparta Rotterdam | 2017–18 | Eredivisie | 7 | 3 | 0 | 0 | — | | — | | 7 | 3 |
| Jong Sparta | 2017–18 | Tweede Divisie | 4 | 0 | — | | — | | — | | 4 | 0 |
| SV Meppen | 2018–19 | 3. Liga | 27 | 14 | — | | — | | — | | 27 | 14 |
| Eintracht Braunschweig | 2019–20 | 3. Liga | 29 | 5 | — | | — | | — | | 29 | 5 |
| Eintracht Braunschweig | 2020–21 | 2. Bundesliga | 31 | 7 | 1 | 0 | — | | — | | 32 | 7 |
| Eintracht Braunschweig | 2021–22 | 3. Liga | 2 | 0 | 0 | 0 | — | | — | | 2 | 0 |
| Eintracht Braunschweig | Total | | 62 | 12 | 1 | 0 | 0 | 0 | 0 | 0 | 63 | 12 |
| TSG Hoffenheim II | 2021–22 | Regionalliga Südwest | 34 | 20 | — | | — | | — | | 34 | 20 |
| TSG Hoffenheim II | 2022–23 | Regionalliga Südwest | 24 | 11 | — | | — | | — | | 24 | 11 |
| TSG Hoffenheim II | Total | | 68 | 31 | 0 | 0 | 0 | 0 | 0 | 0 | 68 | 31 |
| TSG Hoffenheim | 2021–22 | Bundesliga | 1 | 0 | 0 | 0 | — | | — | | 1 | 0 |
| Career total | | | 464 | 153 | 13 | 7 | 6 | 2 | 12 | 0 | 495 | 162 |

== Honours ==
Hull City

- Football League Championship runner-up: 2012–13

Individual

- Swiss Challenge League top scorer: 2009–10 (23 goals in 29 games for FC Vaduz)
- 2. Bundesliga top scorer: 2011–12 (17 goals in 33 games for SC Paderborn 07)
- Regionalliga Südwest top scorer: 2021–22 (20 goals in 34 games for 1899 Hoffenheim II)
