= Felix Dornebusch =

German footballer (born 1994)

Personal information
- Date of birth: 12 July 1994 (age 32)
- Place of birth: Witten, Germany
- Height: 1.93 m (6 ft 4 in)
- Position: Goalkeeper

Team information
- Current team: Stuttgarter Kickers
- Number: 1

Youth career
- 1998–2005: Teutonia Ehrenfeld
- 2005–2006: SG Wattenscheid 09
- 2006–2011: Schalke 04
- 2011–2013: VfL Bochum

Senior career*
Years	Team	Apps	(Gls)
2012–2015	VfL Bochum II	38	(0)
2013–2019	VfL Bochum	9	(0)
2019–2020	1. FC Nürnberg	7	(0)
2020–2021	Eintracht Braunschweig	8	(0)
2021–2022	Fortuna Sittard	0	(0)
2023	VfB Oldenburg	8	(0)
2023–	Stuttgarter Kickers	75	(0)
- * Club domestic league appearances and goals as of 24 September 2026

Felix Dornebusch (born 12 July 1994) is a German professional footballer who plays as a goalkeeper for Stuttgarter Kickers.

== Career ==
In January 2023, free agent Dornebusch joined 3. Liga club VfB Oldenburg.

On 7 June 2023, Dornebusch moved to Stuttgarter Kickers.

== Career statistics ==
As of match played 7 December 2024

Appearances and goals by club, season and competition
Club	Season	League			Cup		Other		Total	
Club	Season	Division	Apps	Goals	Apps	Goals	Apps	Goals	Apps	Goals
VfL Bochum II	2011–12	Regionalliga West	0	0	—		—		0	0
VfL Bochum II	2012–13	Regionalliga West	1	0	—		—		1	0
VfL Bochum II	2013–14	Regionalliga West	15	0	—		—		15	0
VfL Bochum II	2014–15	Regionalliga West	22	0	—		—		22	0
VfL Bochum II	Total		38	0	—		—		38	0
VfL Bochum	2013–14	2. Bundesliga	0	0	0	0	—		0	0
VfL Bochum	2014–15	2. Bundesliga	0	0	0	0	—		0	0
VfL Bochum	2015–16	2. Bundesliga	0	0	0	0	—		0	0
VfL Bochum	2016–17	2. Bundesliga	0	0	0	0	—		0	0
VfL Bochum	2017–18	2. Bundesliga	9	0	1	0	—		10	0
VfL Bochum	2018–19	2. Bundesliga	0	0	1	0	—		1	0
VfL Bochum	Total		9	0	2	0	—		11	0
1. FC Nürnberg	2019–20	2. Bundesliga	7	0	—		0	0	7	0
Eintracht Braunschweig	2020–21	2. Bundesliga	8	0	0	0	—		8	0
Fortuna Sittard	2021–22	Eredivisie	0	0	0	0	—		0	0
VfB Oldenburg	2022–23	3. Liga	8	0	—		—		8	0
Stuttgarter Kickers	2023–24	Regionalliga Südwest	34	0	—		4	0	38	0
Stuttgarter Kickers	2024–25	Regionalliga Südwest	20	0	—		0	0	20	0
Stuttgarter Kickers	Total		54	0	—		4	0	58	0
Career total			124	0	2	0	4	0	130	0
