= Nico Klaß =

German footballer

Personal information
- Full name: Nico Klaß
- Date of birth: 3 April 1997 (age 29)
- Place of birth: Duisburg, Germany
- Height: 1.87 m (6 ft 2 in)
- Position: Centre-back

Team information
- Current team: Rot-Weiß Oberhausen
- Number: 14

Youth career
- 2007–2016: MSV Duisburg

Senior career*
Years	Team	Apps	(Gls)
2016–2018	TV Jahn Hiesfeld	49	(3)
2018–2020	Rot-Weiß Oberhausen	34	(2)
2020–2021	Eintracht Braunschweig	15	(0)
2021–	Rot-Weiß Oberhausen	0	(0)
- * Club domestic league appearances and goals as of 12 August 2021

Nico Klaß (born 3 April 1997) is a German footballer who plays as a centre-back for Rot-Weiß Oberhausen.

== Career ==
Klaß made his professional debut for Eintracht Braunschweig in the 2. Bundesliga on 26 September 2020, coming on as an 81st-minute substitute for Suleiman Abdullahi in the 0–0 home draw against Holstein Kiel.
