= Yari Otto =

German footballer

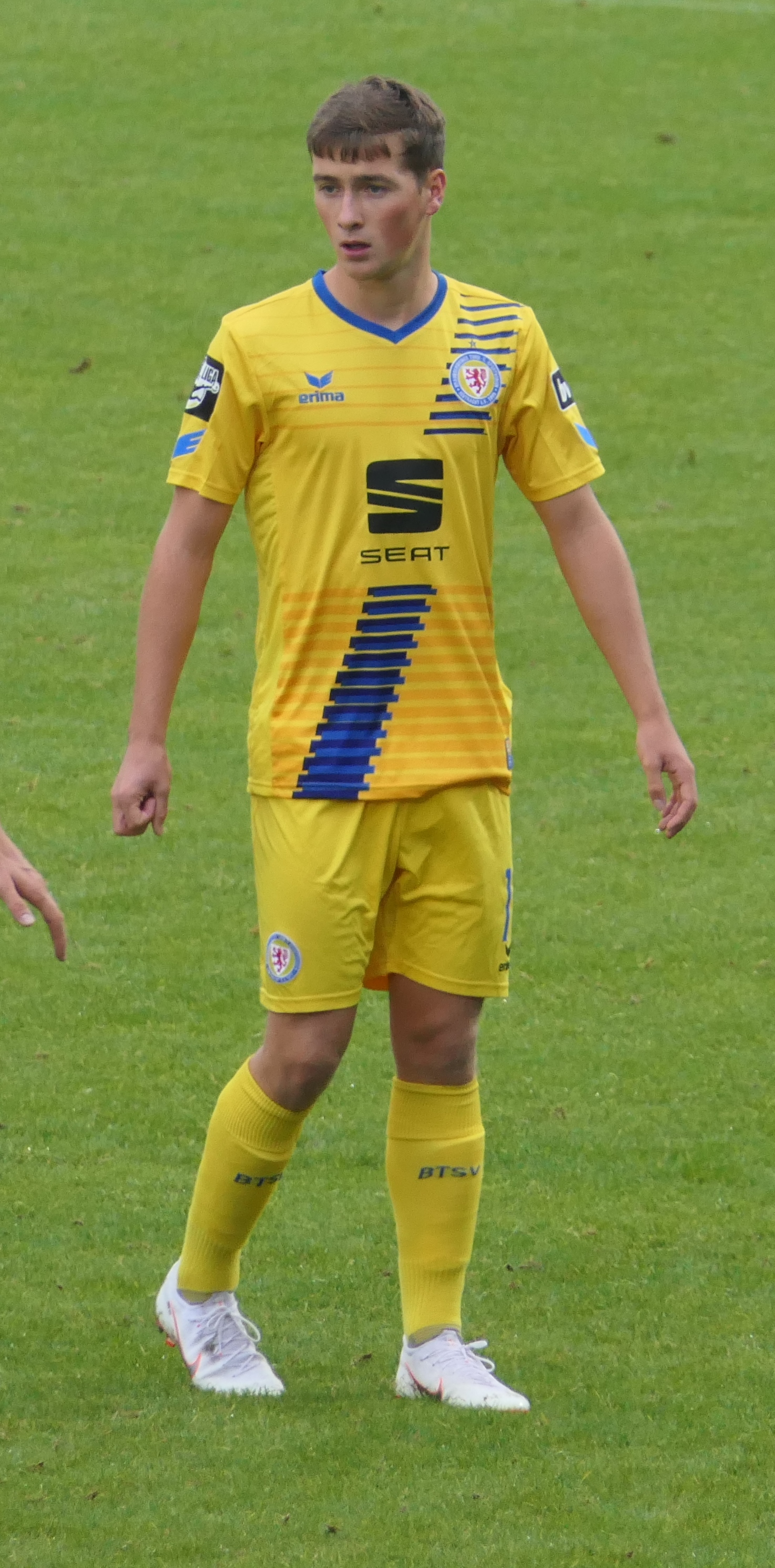
- Otto with Eintracht Braunschweig in 2018

Personal information
- Date of birth: 27 May 1999 (age 27)
- Place of birth: Wolfsburg, Germany
- Height: 1.80 m (5 ft 11 in)
- Position: Midfielder

Team information
- Current team: SC Verl
- Number: 17

Youth career
- –2011: TSG Mörse
- 2011–2018: VfL Wolfsburg

Senior career*
| Years | Team | Apps | (Gls) |
| 2018 | Eintracht Braunschweig II | 2 | (0) |
| 2018–2022 | Eintracht Braunschweig | 91 | (7) |
| 2022– | SC Verl | 135 | (12) |

International career^{‡}
| 2014–2015 | Germany U16 | 9 | (3) |
| 2015–2016 | Germany U17 | 14 | (4) |
| 2017–2018 | Germany U19 | 9 | (1) |
- * Club domestic league appearances and goals as of 28 May 2026 ‡ National team caps and goals as of 20:01, 3 August 2018 (UTC)

Yari Otto (born 27 May 1999) is a German professional footballer who plays as a midfielder for 3. Liga club SC Verl.

== Personal life ==
Yari's brother Nick is also a footballer.
