= Leon Bürger =

German footballer

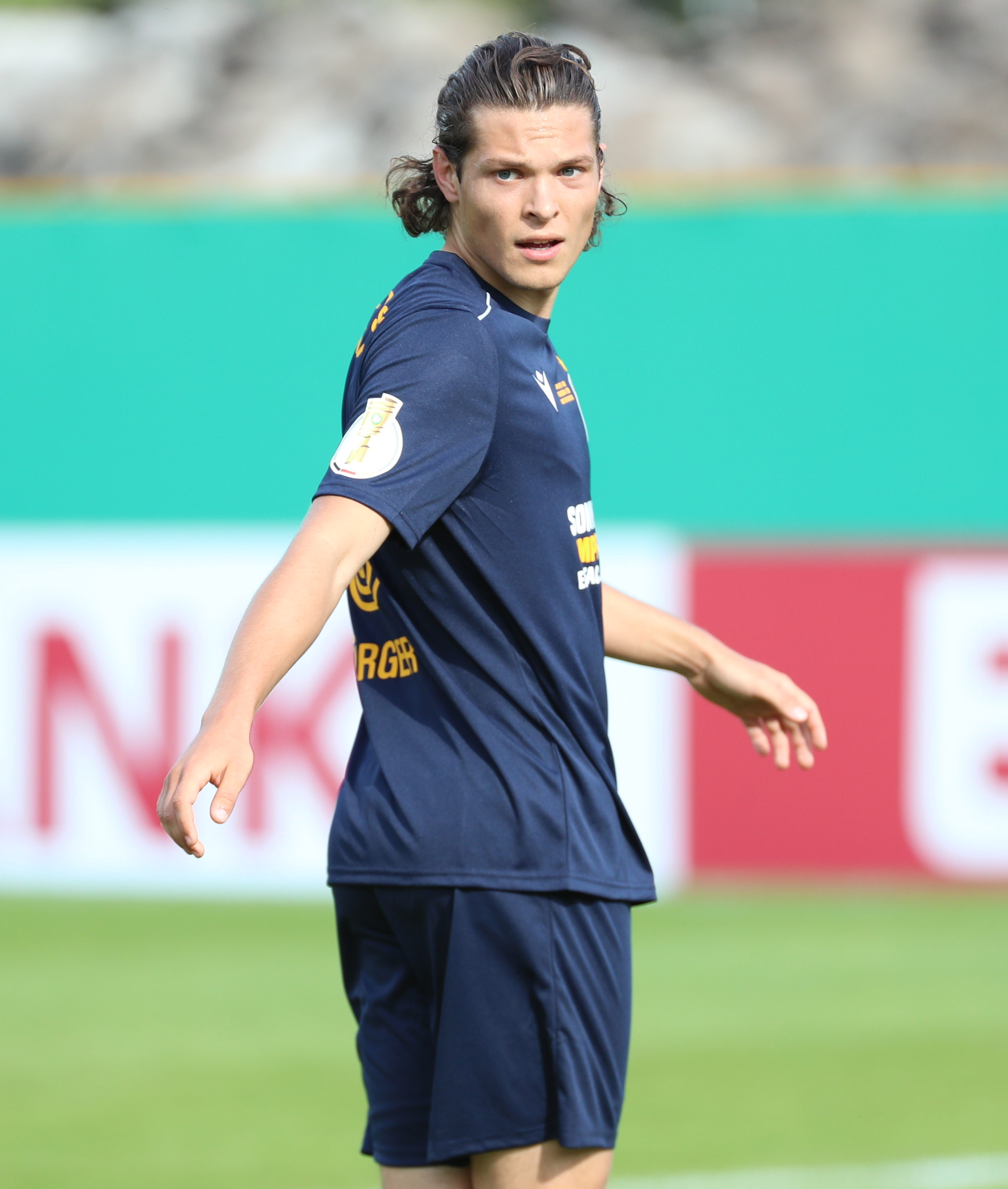
- Bürger in 2021

Personal information
- Date of birth: 11 November 1999 (age 26)
- Place of birth: Germany
- Height: 1.81 m (5 ft 11 in)
- Position: Midfielder

Team information
- Current team: Babelsberg 03
- Number: 22

Youth career
- –2014: Carl Zeiss Jena
- 2014–2016: VfL Wolfsburg
- 2016–2018: Eintracht Braunschweig

Senior career*
Years	Team	Apps	(Gls)
2018–2019	Eintracht Braunschweig II	10	(2)
2018–2021	Eintracht Braunschweig	12	(2)
2021–2022	Carl Zeiss Jena	31	(1)
2022–2023	SC Verl	4	(0)
2023	→ Babelsberg 03 (loan)	13	(0)
2023–	Babelsberg 03	52	(0)

International career^{‡}
2017	Germany U18	1	(0)
2018	Germany U19	1	(0)
- * Club domestic league appearances and goals as of 22 June 2026 ‡ National team caps and goals as of 15:03, 6 October 2018 (UTC)

Leon Bürger (born 11 November 1999) is a German footballer who plays as a midfielder for Regionalliga club Babelsberg 03.

== Club career ==
On 31 January 2023, Bürger joined Babelsberg 03 in Regionalliga on loan. On 29 August 2023, Bürger returned to Babelsberg 03 on a permanent basis with a two-year contract.

== Personal life ==
Bürger is the son of former footballer and manager Henning Bürger.
