= Leandro Putaro =

German footballer

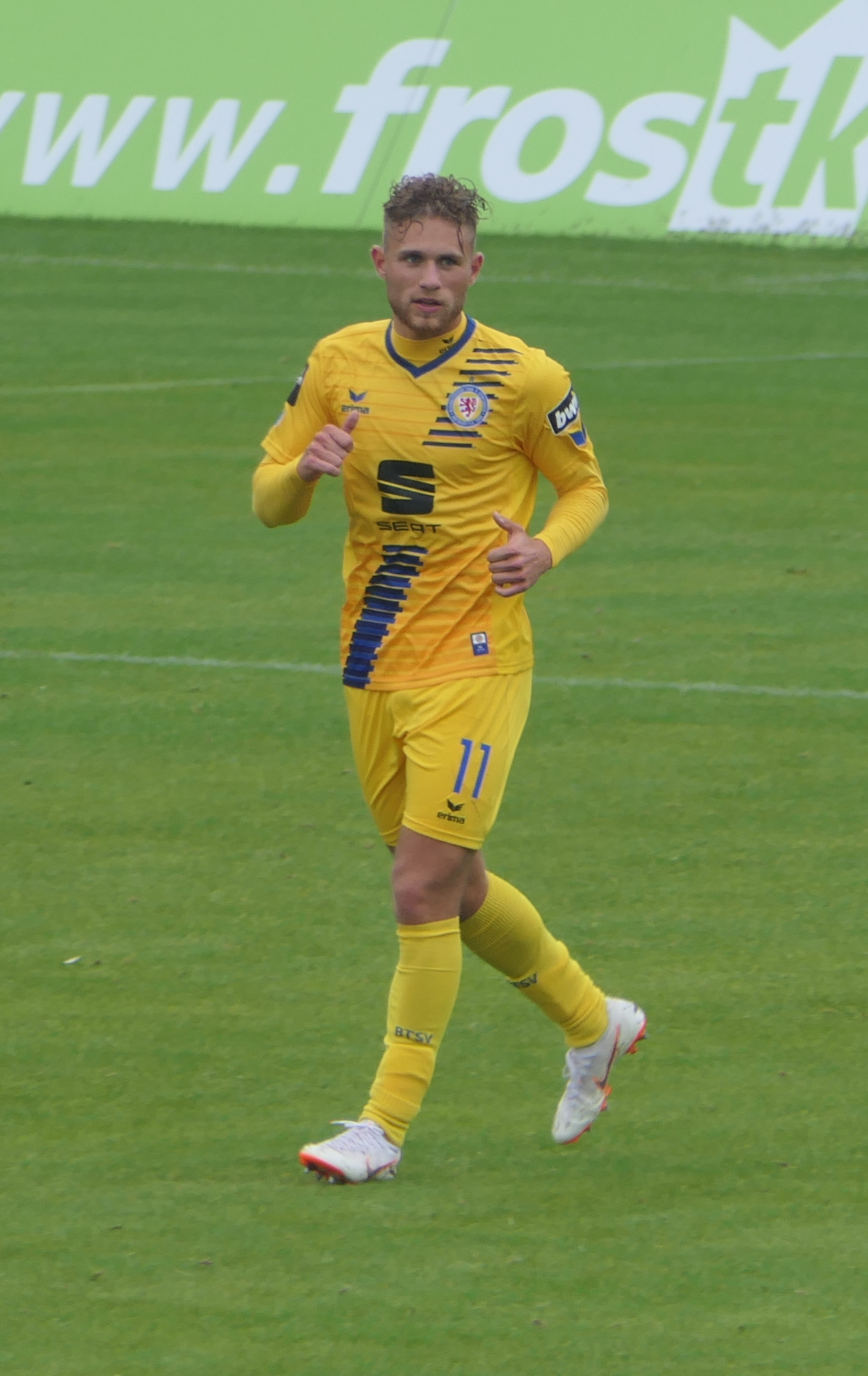
- Putaro with Eintracht Braunschweig in 2018

Personal information
- Date of birth: 7 January 1997 (age 29)
- Place of birth: Göttingen, Germany
- Height: 1.87 m (6 ft 2 in)
- Position: Striker

Team information
- Current team: Berliner FC Dynamo
- Number: 20

Youth career
- SV Göttingen 07
- RSV Göttingen 05
- –2010: Hannover 96
- 2010–2016: VfL Wolfsburg

Senior career*
Years	Team	Apps	(Gls)
2016–2017	VfL Wolfsburg	4	(0)
2016–2017	→ Arminia Bielefeld (loan)	15	(0)
2017–2019	Arminia Bielefeld	19	(2)
2018–2019	→ Eintracht Braunschweig (loan)	26	(2)
2019–2021	Eintracht Braunschweig	18	(1)
2021–2022	SC Verl	41	(9)
2022–2024	VfL Osnabrück	23	(0)
2023–2024	→ Arminia Bielefeld (loan)	25	(3)
2024–2025	Alemannia Aachen	8	(0)
2025–	BFC Dynamo	27	(4)

International career^{‡}
2012–2013	Germany U16	5	(0)
2013	Germany U17	3	(1)
2015–2016	Germany U19	7	(2)
2016	Germany U20	2	(0)
- * Club domestic league appearances and goals as of 22 June 2026 ‡ National team caps and goals as of 13:55, 11 July 2019 (UTC)

Leandro Putaro (born 7 January 1997) is a German professional footballer who plays as a striker for BFC Dynamo.

== Club career ==
=== VfL Wolfsburg ===
Putaro is a youth exponent from VfL Wolfsburg. He made his Bundesliga debut on 6 February 2016 against Schalke 04. He substituted Nicklas Bendtner after 81 minutes in a 3–0 away loss.

=== Arminia Bielefeld ===
For the 2016–17 season Putaro went on loan to 2. Bundesliga side Arminia Bielefeld.

In June 2017, the deal was made permanent and Putaro signed on three-year deal with Bielefeld.

=== Eintracht Braunschweig ===
On 17 August 2018, Putaro joined Eintracht Braunschweig on loan until the end of 2018–19 season.

=== SC Verl ===
Putaro moved to 3. Liga club SC Verl on 2 February 2021, a day after having been released from his contract by Eintracht Braunschweig.

=== Return to Arminia Bielefeld ===
On 29 August 2023, Putaro returned to Arminia Bielefeld on loan.

=== Alemannia Aachen ===
On 23 June 2024, Putaro signed with 3. Liga side Alemannia Aachen.

== International career ==
Putaro was born in Germany and is of Italian descent. Putaro is a German youth international at various levels.

== Career statistics ==
As of match played 1 February 2021

Appearances and goals by club, season and competition
Club	Season	League			DFB-Pokal		Other		Total	
Club	Season	Division	Apps	Goals	Apps	Goals	Apps	Goals	Apps	Goals
VfL Wolfsburg	2015–16	Bundesliga	4	0	0	0	1 (Note: Appearance in the Champions League)	0	5	0
Arminia Bielefeld (loan)	2016–17	2. Bundesliga	15	0	1	0	—		16	0
Arminia Bielefeld	2017–18	2. Bundesliga	19	2	1	0	—		20	2
Eintracht Braunschweig (loan)	2018–19	3. Liga	26	2	1	0	—		27	2
Eintracht Braunschweig	2019–20	3. Liga	16	1	0	0	—		16	1
Eintracht Braunschweig	2020–21	3. Liga	2	0	0	0	—		2	0
Eintracht Braunschweig	Total		18	1	0	0	0	0	18	1
Career total			82	5	3	0	1	0	86	5
