= Suleiman Abdullahi =

Nigerian footballer (born 1996)

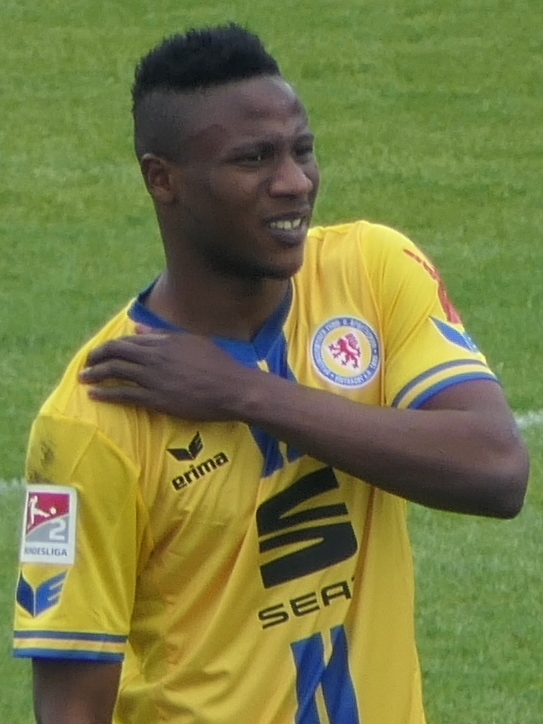
- Abdullahi with Eintracht Braunschweig in 2018

Personal information
- Full name: Suleiman Abdullahi
- Date of birth: 10 December 1996 (age 29)
- Place of birth: Kaduna, Nigeria
- Height: 1.85 m (6 ft 1 in)
- Position: Striker

Youth career
- Gee Lee Academy
- 2014–2015: El-Kanemi Warriors

Senior career*
| Years | Team | Apps | (Gls) |
| 2015 | Viking FK 2 | 1 | (2) |
| 2015–2016 | Viking FK | 40 | (13) |
| 2016–2019 | Eintracht Braunschweig | 41 | (8) |
| 2018–2019 | → Union Berlin (loan) | 19 | (2) |
| 2019–2022 | Union Berlin | 6 | (1) |
| 2020–2021 | → Eintracht Braunschweig (loan) | 16 | (2) |
| 2022–2024 | IFK Göteborg | 19 | (0) |
- * Club domestic league appearances and goals as of 17:06, 10 February 2025 (UTC)

Suleiman Abdullahi (born 10 December 1996) is a Nigerian professional footballer who plays as a striker. He last played for Allsvenskan club IFK Göteborg.

== Career ==
Abdullahi was born in Kaduna, Nigeria. He signed a contract for Viking FK in 2015. He made his debut for Viking on 6 April 2015 against Mjøndalen, they lost the game 1–0.

In June 2016, Abdullahi signed a four-year contract with 2. Bundesliga side Eintracht Braunschweig. In spring 2018 he injured his ankle which kept him out of action until the end of 2017–18 season. In two seasons with Braunschweig he made 41 league appearances scoring 8 goals and making 6 assists.

In August 2018, following Braunschweig's relegation, Abdullahi joined 1. FC Union Berlin on loan for the season. Union Berlin secured an option to sign him permanently until 2022. It was reported he would be able to return to training four to six weeks later as a result of his ankle injury.

On 1 June 2019, 1. FC Union Berlin signed Abdullahi on a permanent transfer following his loan spell at the club.

In August 2020, Abdullahi returned to Eintracht Braunschweig, joining on loan for the 2020–21 season.

On 28 June 2022, Abdullahi signed a contract until the end of 2025 with Swedish club IFK Göteborg.

On 10 February 2025, Abdullahi left IFK Göteborg after mutually agreeing to terminate the contract.

== Career statistics ==
=== Club ===
As of match played 16 May 2021

Appearances and goals by club, season and competition
| Club | Season | League | | | National Cup | | Continental | | Other | | Total | |
| Club | Season | Division | Apps | Goals | Apps | Goals | Apps | Goals | Apps | Goals | Apps | Goals |
|---|---|---|---|---|---|---|---|---|---|---|---|---|
| Viking | 2015 | Eliteserien | 27 | 8 | 4 | 1 | — | | – | | 31 | 9 |
| Viking | 2016 | Eliteserien | 13 | 5 | 2 | 1 | — | | – | | 15 | 6 |
| Viking | Total | | 40 | 13 | 6 | 2 | — | | — | | 46 | 15 |
| Eintracht Braunschweig | 2016–17 | 2. Bundesliga | 13 | 1 | 0 | 0 | — | | 1 (Note: Appearance(s) in promotion play-offs) | 0 | 14 | 1 |
| Eintracht Braunschweig | 2017–18 | 2. Bundesliga | 28 | 7 | 1 | 0 | — | | — | | 29 | 7 |
| Eintracht Braunschweig | Total | | 41 | 8 | 1 | 0 | — | | 1 | 0 | 43 | 8 |
| Union Berlin | 2018–19 | 2. Bundesliga | 19 | 2 | 1 | 0 | — | | 2 | 1 | 22 | 3 |
| Union Berlin | 2019–20 | Bundesliga | 6 | 1 | 0 | 0 | — | | — | | 6 | 1 |
| Union Berlin | Total | | 25 | 3 | 1 | 0 | — | | 2 | 1 | 28 | 4 |
| Eintracht Braunschweig | 2020–21 | 2. Bundesliga | 16 | 2 | 2 | 1 | — | | — | | 18 | 3 |
| Career total | | | 122 | 26 | 10 | 3 | 0 | 0 | 3 | 1 | 135 | 30 |
