= Kevin Goden =

German footballer (born 1999)

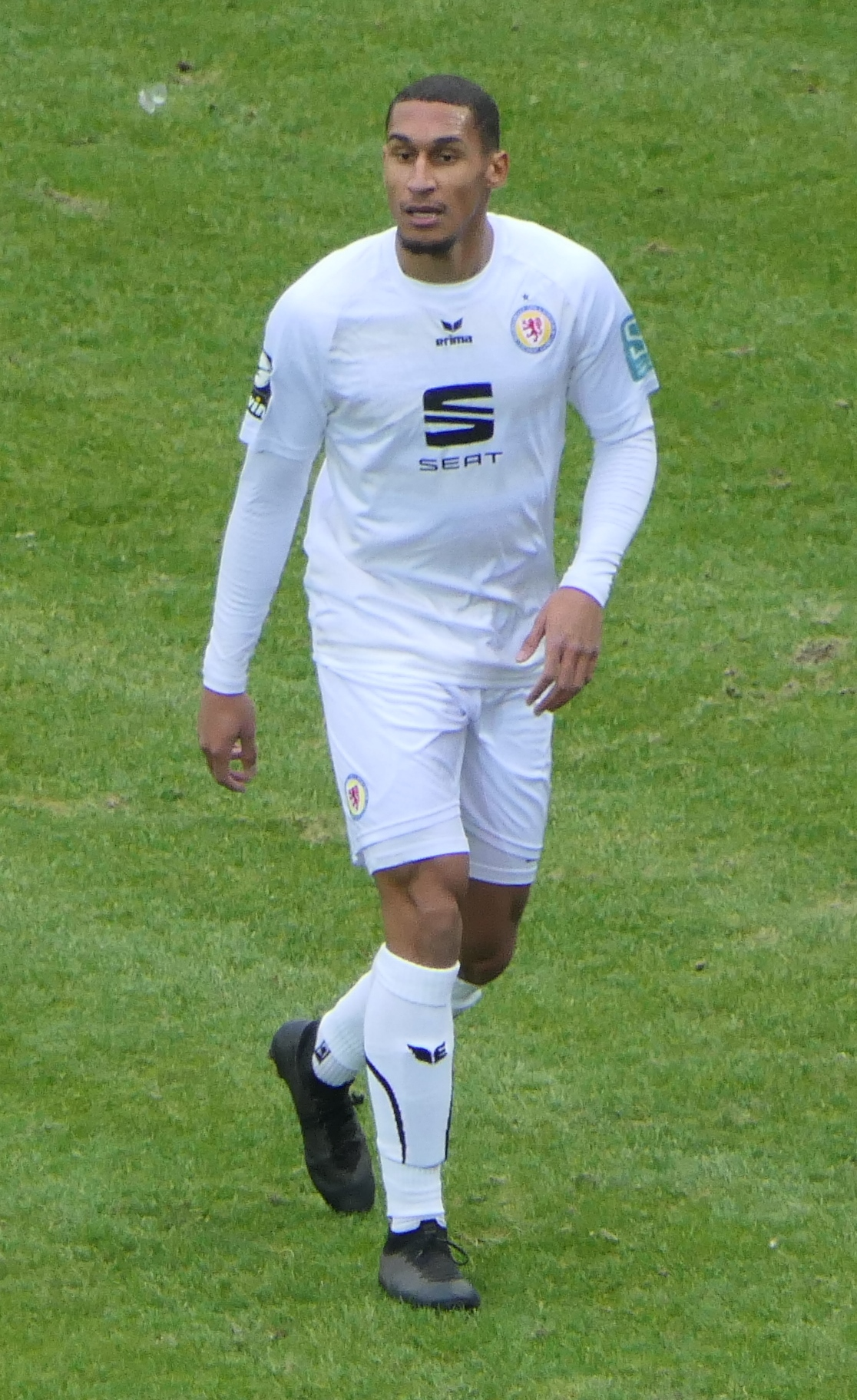
- Goden with Eintracht Braunschweig in 2019

Personal information
- Date of birth: 22 February 1999 (age 27)
- Place of birth: Bonn, Germany
- Height: 1.83 m (6 ft 0 in)
- Position: Centre-forward

Team information
- Current team: Sportfreunde Siegen
- Number: 27

Youth career
- 2009–2018: 1. FC Köln

Senior career*
Years	Team	Apps	(Gls)
2017–2018	1. FC Köln II	2	(0)
2017–2018	1. FC Köln	0	(0)
2018–2021	1. FC Nürnberg II	13	(6)
2018–2021	1. FC Nürnberg	5	(0)
2019–2020	→ Eintracht Braunschweig (loan)	7	(0)
2021–2022	1860 Munich	23	(3)
2021–2023	1860 Munich II	23	(11)
2023–2024	1. FC Düren	26	(14)
2024	Waldhof Mannheim	8	(1)
2024–2025	Alemannia Aachen	21	(1)
2025–	Sportfreunde Siegen	21	(5)

International career^{‡}
2018	Germany U19	1	(0)
- * Club domestic league appearances and goals as of 23 September 2026 ‡ National team caps and goals as of 25 April 2018

Kevin Goden (born 22 February 1999) is a German professional footballer who plays as a centre-forward for Regionalliga West club Sportfreunde Siegen.

== Career ==
Goden made his professional debut for 1. FC Köln on 19 December 2017, coming on as a substitute for Chris Führich in the 2017–18 DFB-Pokal round of 16 away match against Schalke 04.

In May 2018, 1. FC Nürnberg announced Goden would join the club for the 2018–19 season.

In September 2019, Goden joined Eintracht Braunschweig on a season-long loan deal.

On 7 January 2024, Goden signed with Waldhof Mannheim in 3. Liga.

On 29 June 2024, Goden moved to Alemannia Aachen.
