= Michael Schultz (footballer) =

German footballer (born 1993)

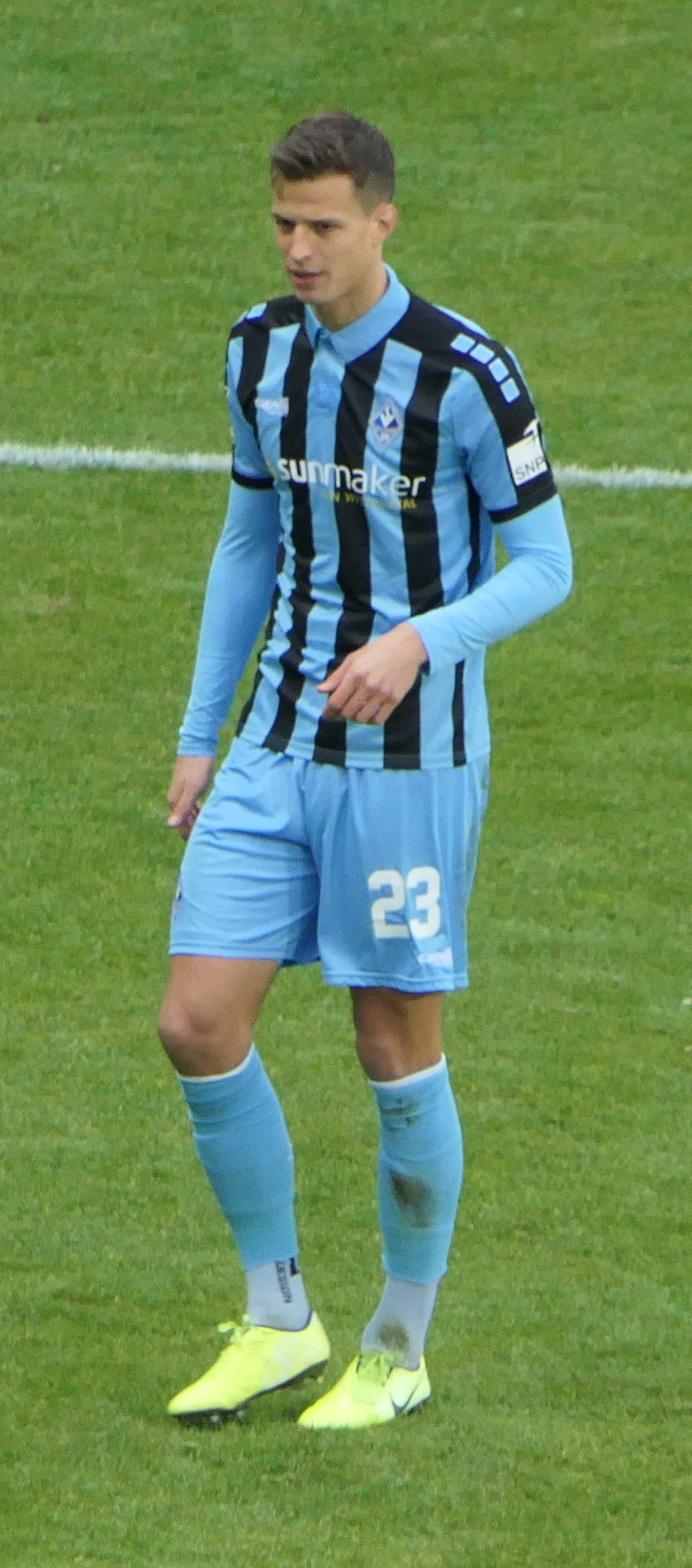
- Schultz with Waldhof Mannheim in December 2019

Personal information
- Date of birth: 30 May 1993 (age 33)
- Place of birth: Landau, Germany
- Height: 1.94 m (6 ft 4 in)
- Position: Centre back

Team information
- Current team: Wehen Wiesbaden
- Number: 14

Youth career
- –2005: Viktoria Herxheim
- 2005–2012: Karlsruher SC

Senior career*
Years	Team	Apps	(Gls)
2012–2014	Karlsruher SC II	67	(3)
2014–2016	1. FC Kaiserslautern II	47	(6)
2016–2020	Waldhof Mannheim	106	(7)
2018	Waldhof Mannheim II	3	(0)
2020–2023	Eintracht Braunschweig	49	(2)
2021	→ Viktoria Köln (loan)	14	(3)
2023–2024	Viktoria Köln	52	(5)
2024–2026	Rot-Weiss Essen	67	(0)
2026–	Wehen Wiesbaden	0	(0)
- * Club domestic league appearances and goals as of 20 May 2026

Michael Schultz (born 30 May 1993) is a German professional footballer who plays as a centre-back for 3. Liga club Wehen Wiesbaden.

== Career ==
Schultz made his debut in the 3. Liga for Waldhof Mannheim on 21 July 2019, starting in the home match against Chemnitzer FC which finished as a 1–1 draw.

On 12 January 2023, Schultz returned to Viktoria Köln.

On 25 June 2024, Schultz moved to Rot-Weiss Essen in 3. Liga.
