= Iba May =

German footballer (born 1998)

Personal information
- Date of birth: 6 June 1998 (age 28)
- Place of birth: Berlin, Germany
- Height: 1.83 m (6 ft 0 in)
- Position: Midfielder

Team information
- Current team: Hertha Zehlendorf
- Number: 11

Youth career
- –2013: Tennis Borussia Berlin
- 2013–2017: VfL Wolfsburg

Senior career*
| Years | Team | Apps | (Gls) |
| 2017–2020 | VfL Wolfsburg II | 58 | (5) |
| 2020–2022 | Eintracht Braunschweig | 15 | (0) |
| 2023 | Viktoria 1889 Berlin | 16 | (0) |
| 2023–2025 | Austria Klagenfurt | 0 | (0) |
| 2024 | → Viktoria 1889 Berlin (loan) | 9 | (0) |
| 2025– | Hertha Zehlendorf | 30 | (2) |
- * Club domestic league appearances and goals as of 22 June 2026

Iba May (born 6 June 1998) is a German professional footballer who plays as a midfielder for Hertha Zehlendorf.

== Career ==
May made his professional debut for Eintracht Braunschweig in the 2020–21 DFB-Pokal on 11 September 2020, coming on as a substitute in the 88th minute for Fabio Kaufmann in the home match against Hertha BSC, which finished as a 5–4 win.

In the summer of 2023, May signed a two-year contract with Austria Klagenfurt in Austria. On 23 January 2024, he was loaned back to Viktoria 1889 Berlin.
