= Marcel Bär =

German footballer

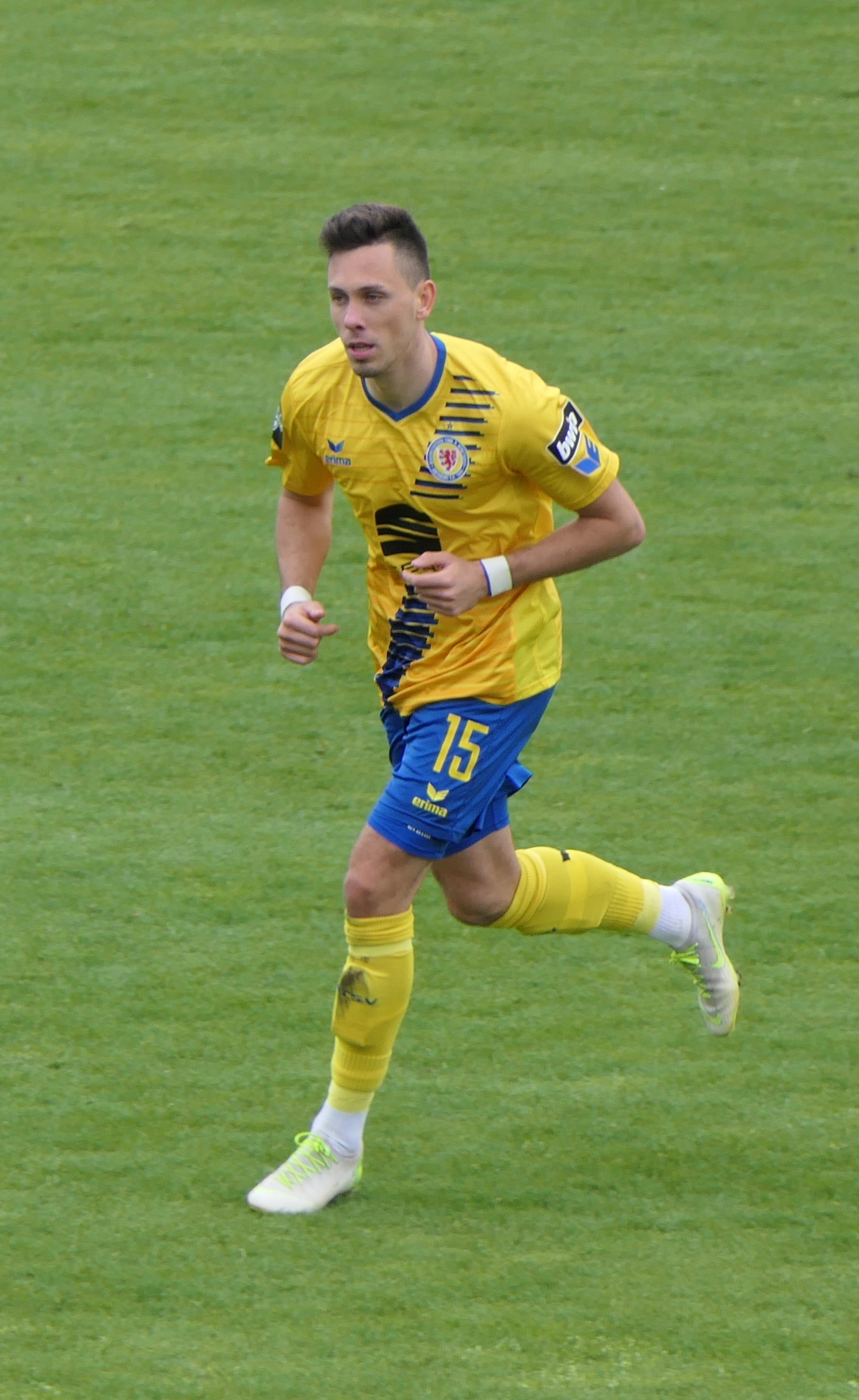
- Bär with Eintracht Braunschweig in 2019

Personal information
- Date of birth: 8 June 1992 (age 34)
- Place of birth: Gifhorn, Germany
- Height: 1.84 m (6 ft 0 in)
- Position: Winger

Team information
- Current team: Erzgebirge Aue
- Number: 15

Youth career
- SV Gifhorn
- –2010: MTV Gifhorn

Senior career*
Years	Team	Apps	(Gls)
2010–2012	MTV Gifhorn		
2012–2015	Eintracht Braunschweig II	83	(14)
2015–2016	Carl Zeiss Jena	31	(6)
2016–2017	FSV Zwickau	30	(5)
2017–2019	VfR Aalen	52	(13)
2019–2021	Eintracht Braunschweig	82	(14)
2021–2023	1860 Munich	62	(27)
2023–	Erzgebirge Aue	87	(37)
- * Club domestic league appearances and goals as of 23 September 2026

Marcel Bär (born 8 June 1992) is a German professional footballer who plays as a winger for club Erzgebirge Aue.

== Career ==
=== Early career ===
Born in Gifhorn, Bär began his career in the youth teams of local sides SV Gifhorn and MTV Gifhorn, being promoted to the first team by the latter in 2010.

=== Eintracht Braunschweig II ===
Bär played for Eintracht Braunschweig II during the 2013–14 and 2014–15 Regionalliga Nord seasons where he scored nine goals in 62 appearances.

=== Carl Zeiss Jena and FSV Zwickau ===
He then played for Regionalliga Nordost club Carl Zeiss Jena the following season where he scored six goals in 33 appearances.

He played for FSV Zwickau in the 2016–17 3. Liga season where he scored five goals in 31 appearances.

=== VfR Aalen ===
He played for VfR Aalen the following two seasons where he scored 13 goals in 52 appearances.

=== Return to Eintracht Braunschweig ===
He returned to Eintracht Braunschweig to play for the first team where he scored 14 goals in 84 appearances in the 2018–19, 2019–20, and 2020–21 seasons.

=== Erzgebirge Aue ===
He signed a contract with Erzgebirge Aue on 23 June 2023.

== Career statistics ==
As of match played 14 October 2023

Appearances and goals by club, season and competition
Club	Season	League			Cup		Total		Ref.
Club	Season	Division	Apps	Goals	Apps	Goals	Apps	Goals	Ref.
Eintracht Braunschweig II	2013–14	Regionalliga Nord	29	4	—		29	4	
Eintracht Braunschweig II	2014–15	Regionalliga Nord	33	5	—		33	5	
Eintracht Braunschweig II	Total		62	9	—		62	9	—
Carl Zeiss Jena	2015–16	Regionalliga Nordost	31	6	2	0	33	6	
FSV Zwickau	2016–17	3. Liga	30	5	1	0	31	5	
VfR Aalen	2017–18	3. Liga	33	6	—		33	6	
VfR Aalen	2018–19	3. Liga	19	7	—		19	7	
VfR Aalen	Total		52	13	—		52	13	—
Eintracht Braunschweig	2018–19	3. Liga	17	2	—		17	2	
Eintracht Braunschweig	2019–20	3. Liga	35	8	—		35	8	
Eintracht Braunschweig	2020–21	2. Bundesliga	30	4	2	0	32	4	
Eintracht Braunschweig	Total		82	14	2	0	84	14	—
1860 Munich	2021–22	3. Liga	37	21	3	0	40	21	
1860 Munich	2022–23	3. Liga	25	6	1	0	26	6	
1860 Munich	Total		62	27	4	0	66	27	—
Erzgebirge Aue	2023–24	3. Liga	9	3	—		9	3	
Career Total			328	77	9	0	337	77	—
