= 2016–17 SpVgg Greuther Fürth season =

SpVgg Greuther Fürth
2016–17 season
- Manager: Janos Radoki
- Stadium: Sportpark Ronhof
- 2. Bundesliga: 8th place
- DFB-Pokal: Round of 16
- Top goalscorer: League: Serdar Dursun (10); All: Serdar Dursun (11)
- Highest home attendance: 13,209 vs 1860 Munich
- Lowest home attendance: 6,390 vs Sandhausen
- Average home league attendance: 9,525
Home colours	Away colours	Third colours

The 2016–17 SpVgg Greuther Fürth season is the 114th season in the club's football history.

== Review and events ==
In 2016–17 the club plays in the 2. Bundesliga.

The club also takes part in the 2016–17 edition of the DFB-Pokal, the German Cup.

== Friendly matches ==
25 June 2016	1. FC Sand	0–3	SpVgg Greuther Fürth	Untersteinbach
17:00 CEST (UTC+02)				Attendance: 550

2 July 2016	ASV Veitsbronn-Siegelsdorf	0–12	SpVgg Greuther Fürth	Veitsbronn
16:00 CEST (UTC+02)				Attendance: 400

13 July 2016	SpVgg Greuther Fürth	2–0	VfR Aalen	Dietenhofen
18:30 CEST (UTC+02)				Attendance: 400

15 July 2016	ASV Zirndorf	0–7	SpVgg Greuther Fürth	Zirndorf
18:00 CEST (UTC+02)				Attendance: 830

16 July 2016	SpVgg Greuther Fürth	2–3	SC Paderborn	Bad Kissingen
16:00 CEST (UTC+02)				Attendance: 350

23 July 2016	SpVgg Greuther Fürth	2–2	SG Sonnenhof Großaspach	Walchsee (Austria)
10:30 CEST (UTC+02)				Attendance: 150

25 July 2016	SpVgg Greuther Fürth	2–2	Cayuk Rizespor (Turkey)	Walchsee (Austria)
18:00 CEST (UTC+02)				Attendance: 150

27 July 2016	SpVgg Greuther Fürth	2–2	Akhisar Belediyespor (Turkey)	Salzburg (Austria)
18:15 CEST (UTC+02)				Stadium: Austria Stadion; Attendance: 50

30 July 2016	VfB Stuttgart	3–1	SpVgg Greuther Fürth	Stuttgart
16:30 CEST (UTC+02)				Attendance: 2270

== Competitions ==
Win Draw Loss

=== 2. Bundesliga ===
==== League table ====
Pos	Team	Pld	W	D	L	GF	GA	GD	Pts
6	1. FC Heidenheim	34	12	10	12	43	39	+4	46
7	FC St. Pauli	34	12	9	13	39	35	+4	45
8	SpVgg Greuther Fürth	34	12	9	13	33	40	−7	45
9	VfL Bochum	34	10	14	10	42	47	−5	44
10	SV Sandhausen	34	10	12	12	41	36	+5	42

Source: DFB
Rules for classification: 1) Points; 2) Goal difference; 3) Goals scored

==== Matches ====
7 August 2016 1	SpVgg Fürth	1–0	TSV 1860 München	Fürth
13:30 CEST (UTC+02)	Zulj 45'	Match Report		Stadium: Sportpark Ronhof; Attendance: 13,209; Referee: Felix Zwayer; Man of the Match: Zulj

14 August 2016 2	Hannover 96	3–1	SpVgg Fürth	Hanover
13:30 CEST (UTC+02)	Fossum 23'; Maier 74'; Harnik 85'	Match Report	Berisha 90'	Stadium: HDI-Arena; Attendance: 38,400; Referee: Jochen Drees; Man of the Match: Tschauner

27 August 2016 3	SpVgg Fürth	3–2	FC Erzgebirge Aue	Fürth
13:00 CEST (UTC+02)	Freis 39'; Dursun 47'; Marcel Franke 90+4'	Match Report	Kvesić 62'; Franke 78' (o.g.)	Stadium: Sportpark Ronhof; Attendance: 8,705; Referee: Thorben Siewer; Man of the Match: Narey

11 September 2016 4	Fortuna Düsseldorf	1–1	SpVgg Fürth	Düsseldorf
13:30 CEST (UTC+02)	Fink 78'	Match Report	Narey 23'	Stadium: ESPRIT Arena; Attendance: 25,866; Referee: Robert Kampka; Man of the Match: Narey

16 September 2016 5	SpVgg Fürth	0–3	FC Würzburger Kickers	Fürth
18:30 CEST (UTC+02)		Match Report	Pisot 10'; Pisot 79'; Schröck 84'	Stadium: Sportpark Ronhof; Attendance: 10,510; Referee: Martin Thomsen; Man of the Match: Pisot

20 September 2016 6	1. FC Nürnberg	1–2	SpVgg Fürth	Nuremberg
18:30 CEST (UTC+02)	Burgstaller 90+3'	Match Report	Dursun 40'; Steininger 54'	Stadium: Stadion Nürnberg; Attendance: 32,363; Referee: Tobias Stieler (Hamburg); Man of the Match: Franke

23 September 2016 7	SpVgg Fürth	1–1	SV Sandhausen	Fürth
18:30 CEST (UTC+02)	Freis 73'	Match Report	Wooten 90+3'	Stadium: Sportpark Ronhof; Attendance: 6,930; Referee: Frank Willenborg (Osnabrück); Man of the Match: Gjasula

3 October 2016 8	VfB Stuttgart	4–0	SpVgg Fürth	Stuttgart
20:15 CEST (UTC+02)	Mané 2', 4'; Pavard 24'; Gentner 80'	Report		Stadium: Mercedes-Benz Arena; Attendance: 38,150; Referee: René Rohde (Rostock); Man of the Match: Mané

15 October 2016 9	SpVgg Fürth	0–2	1. FC Heidenheim	Fürth
13:00 CEST (UTC+02)		Report	Halloran 14'; Kleindienst 18'	Stadium: Sportpark Ronhof; Attendance: 7,325; Referee: Alexander Sather; Man of the Match: Schnatterer

23 October 2016 10	Eintracht Braunschweig	1–0	SpVgg Fürth	Braunschweig
13:30 CEST (UTC+02)	Hernández 59'	Match Report		Stadium: Eintracht-Stadion; Attendance: 20,900; Referee: Pascal Ittrich; Man of the Match: Hernández

29 October 2016 11	SpVgg Fürth	0–1	1. FC Kaiserslautern	Fürth
13:00 CEST (UTC+02)		Match Report	Osawe 51'	Stadium: Sportpark Ronhof; Attendance: 8,490; Referee: Marco Fritz

5 November 2016 12	SpVgg Fürth	2–1	VfL Bochum	Fürth
13:00 CET (UTC+01)	Freis 51'; Sararer 82'	Report	Gündüz 67'	Stadium: Sportpark Ronhof; Attendance: 7,125; Referee: Daniel Schlager; Man of the Match: Kirsch

20 November 2016 13	Dynamo Dresden	2–1	SpVgg Fürth	Dresden
13:30 CET (UTC+01)	Gogia 20', 86'	Report	Dursun 90+2'	Stadium: Stadion Dresden; Attendance: 28,097; Referee: Martin Petersen

25 November 2016 14	SpVgg Fürth	2–1	Arminia Bielefeld	Fürth
18:30 CET (UTC+01)	Rapp 30'; Tripić 90'	Report	Rapp 77' (o.g.)	Stadium: Sportpark Ronhof; Attendance: 7,305; Referee: Benedikt Kempkes

2 December 2016 15	Karlsruher SC	1–2	SpVgg Fürth	Karlsruhe
18:30 CET (UTC+01)	Diamantakos 80'	Report	Narey 6'; Bolly 24'	Stadium: Wildparkstadion; Attendance: 10,575; Referee: Arne Aarnink

11 December 2016 16	SpVgg Fürth	0–2	FC St. Pauli	Fürth
13:30 CET (UTC+01)		Report	Bouhaddouz 64'; Şahin 90+1'	Stadium: Sportpark Ronhof; Attendance: 10,015; Referee: Frank Willenborg

11 December 2016 17	1. FC Union Berlin	1–1	SpVgg Fürth	Berlin
13:30 CET (UTC+01)	Leistner 65'	Report	Dursun 80'	Stadium: Stadion An der Alten Försterei; Attendance: 19,228; Referee: Bibiana Steinhaus

27 January 2017 18	TSV 1860 Munich	2–1	SpVgg Fürth	Munich
18:30 CET (UTC+01)	Olić 43'; Liendl 86'	Report	Dursun 13'	Stadium: Allianz Arena; Attendance: 15,800; Referee: Sven Jablonski; Man of the Match: Liendl

3 February 2017 19	SpVgg Fürth	4–1	Hannover 96	Fürth
18:30 CET (UTC+01)	Dursun 16' (64); Franke 21'; Berisha 67'	Report	Prib 88'	Stadium: Sportpark Ronhof; Attendance: 8,465; Referee: Robert Kempter; Man of the Match: Dursun

10 February 2017 20	FC Erzgebirge Aue	0–0	SpVgg Fürth	Aue
18:30 CET (UTC+01)		Report		Stadium: Sparkassen-Erzgebirgsstadion; Attendance: 6,500; Referee: Dr. Matthias Jöllenbeck; Man of the Match: Skarlatidis

18 February 2017 21	SpVgg Fürth	1–0	Fortuna Düsseldorf	Fürth
13:00 CET (UTC+01)	Zulj 41'	Report		Stadium: Sportpark Ronhof; Attendance: 7,978; Referee: Patrick Alt; Man of the Match: Zulj

24 February 2017 22	FC Würzburger Kickers	1–1	SpVgg Fürth	Würzburg
18:30 CET (UTC+01)	Schröck 47'	Report	Diaz 52' (o.g.)	Stadium: Stadion am Dallenberg; Attendance: 10,251; Referee: Florian Heft; Man of the Match: Taffertshofer

5 March 2017 23	SpVgg Fürth	1–0	1. FC Nürnberg	Fürth
13:30 CET (UTC+01)	Zulj 77'	Report		Stadium: Sportpark Ronhof Thomas Sommer; Attendance: 13,015; Referee: Harm Osmers; Man of the Match: Zulj

12 March 2017 24	SV Sandhausen	1–1	SpVgg Fürth	Sandhausen
13:30 CET (UTC+01)	Kuhn 14'	Report	Dursun 88'	Stadium: Hardtwaldstadion; Attendance: 4,813; Referee: Timo Gerach; Man of the Match: Kuhn

18 March 2017 25	SpVgg Fürth	1–0	VfB Stuttgart	Fürth
13:00 CET (UTC+01)	Berisha 8'	Report		Stadium: Sportpark Ronhof Thomas Sommer; Attendance: 12,660; Referee: Alexander Sather; Man of the Match: Megyeri

2 April 2017 26	1. FC Heidenheim	0–2	SpVgg Fürth	Heidenheim an der Brenz
13:30 CEST (UTC+02)		Report	Robert Zulj 21' (61)	Stadium: Voith-Arena; Attendance: 12,000; Referee: Sören Storks; Man of the Match: Zulj

5 April 2017 27	SpVgg Fürth	0–0	Eintracht Braunschweig	Fürth
14:30 CEST (UTC+02)		Report		Stadium: Sportpark Ronhof; Attendance: 8,035; Referee: Dr. Robert Kampka; Man of the Match: Fejzic

8 April 2017 28	1. FC Kaiserslautern	2–0	SpVgg Fürth	Kaiserslautern
13:00 CEST (UTC+02)	Zoua 20', Moritz 39'	Report		Stadium: Fritz-Walter-Stadion; Attendance: 21,812; Referee: Robert Schröder; Man of the Match: Moritz

16 April 2017 29	VfL Bochum	1–0	SpVgg Fürth	Bochum
13:30 CEST (UTC+02)	Thomas Eisfeld 14'	Report		Stadium: Vonovia Ruhrstadion; Attendance: 11,465; Referee: Timo Gerach; Man of the Match: Eisfeld

21 April 2017 30	SpVgg Fürth	1–0	Dynamo Dresden	Fürth
18:30 CEST (UTC+02)	Aosman 76' (o.g.)	Report		Stadium: Sportpark Ronhof Thomas Sommer; Attendance: 10,775; Referee: Florian Heft; Man of the Match: Franke

29 April 2017 31	Arminia Bielefeld	1–1	SpVgg Fürth	Bielefeld
13:00 CEST (UTC+02)	Voglsammer 54'	Report	Dursun 90+3'	Stadium: Schüco-Arena; Attendance: 16,125; Referee: Matthias Jöllenbeck; Man of the Match: Voglsammer

7 May 2017 32	SpVgg Fürth	0–1	Karlsruher SC	Fürth
13:30 CEST (UTC+02)		Report	Rolim 89'	Stadium: Sportpark Ronhof; Attendance: 8,295; Referee: Dr. Martin Thomsen; Man of the Match: Hofmann

14 May 2017 33	FC St. Pauli	1–1	SpVgg Fürth	Hamburg
15:30 CEST (UTC+02)	Sobiech 70'	Report	Zulj 37'	Stadium: Millerntor-Stadion; Attendance: 29,546; Referee: Alexander Sather; Man of the Match: Steininger

21 May 2017 34	SpVgg Fürth	1–2	1. FC Union Berlin	Fürth
15:30 CEST (UTC+02)	Dursun 66'	Report	Redondo 38', Polter 78'	Stadium: Sportpark Ronhof; Attendance: 13,090; Referee: Thorben Siewer; Man of the Match: Polter

=== DFB-Pokal ===
21 August 2016 First round	Eintracht Norderstedt	1–4	Greuther Fürth	Norderstedt
15:30	Drinkuth 80'	Report	Žulj 42'; Dursun 71'; Tripić 89'; Kirsch 90+2'	Stadium: Edmund-Plambeck-Stadion; Attendance: 3,000; Referee: Benjamin Bläser

26 October 2016 Second round	SpVgg Greuther Fürth	2–1	Mainz 05	Fürth
18:30	Sararer 79'; V. Berisha 90'	Report	Córdoba 70'	Stadium: Stadion am Laubenweg; Attendance: 5,980; Referee: Guido Winkmann

7–8 February 2017 Round of 16	SpVgg Greuther Fürth	0–2	Borussia Mönchengladbach	Fürth
		Report	Wendt 13'; Hazard 30'	Stadium: Sportpark Ronhof; Attendance: 13,205

== Overall ==
Matches played	34
Matches won	12
Matches drawn	9
Matches lost	13
Goals scored	33
Goals conceded	40
Goal difference	−7
Clean sheets	8
Yellow cards	
Red cards	2
Best result(s)	4–1
Worst result(s)	0–4
Points earned	45/102
