= 2020–21 Würzburger Kickers season =

Würzburger Kickers
2020–21 season
- President: Daniel Sauer
- Manager: Michael Schiele
- Stadium: flyeralarm Arena
- 2. Bundesliga: 18th (relegated)
- DFB-Pokal: First round
Home colours	Away colours

The 2020–21 Würzburger Kickers season was the club's 114th season in existence and their first season back in the second flight of German football. In addition to the domestic league, Würzburger Kickers participated in the DFB-Pokal. The season covered the period from 5 July 2020 to 30 June 2021.

== Players ==
=== First-team squad ===
As of 5 January 2021

Note: Flags indicate national team as defined under FIFA eligibility rules; some limited exceptions apply. Players may hold more than one non-FIFA nationality.

No.	Pos.	Nation	Player
1	GK	GER	Fabian Giefer
3	DF	GER	Niklas Hoffmann
4	DF	GER	Lars Dietz
6	DF	GER	Tobias Kraulich
7	MF	SLO	Mitja Lotrič
8	FW	BUL	Vladimir Nikolov
9	FW	GER	Dominic Baumann
10	FW	GER	Marvin Pieringer (on loan from SC Freiburg II)
12	MF	GER	Patrick Sontheimer
14	DF	GER	Hendrik Hansen
17	DF	GER	Umut Ünlü
18	MF	NED	Chris David
19	DF	BRA	Douglas
20	FW	SUI	Ridge Munsy
21	DF	GER	Luke Hemmerich

No.	Pos.	Nation	Player
22	DF	GER	Daniel Hägele (captain)
24	FW	AUT	Stefan Maierhofer
25	MF	GER	Dominik Meisel
26	DF	GER	Lion Schweers
27	MF	COD	Nzuzi Toko
28	DF	GER	Arne Feick
29	MF	POL	David Kopacz
30	DF	BRA	Ewerton
31	DF	VEN	Rolf Feltscher
32	DF	GER	Christian Strohdiek
33	GK	NED	Eric Verstappen
34	DF	GER	Frank Ronstadt
35	MF	CZE	Martin Hašek
37	FW	NED	Rajiv van La Parra
38	DF	GER	Robert Herrmann
39	GK	GER	Hendrik Bonmann

=== Out on loan ===
Note: Flags indicate national team as defined under FIFA eligibility rules; some limited exceptions apply. Players may hold more than one non-FIFA nationality.

No.	Pos.	Nation	Player
—	GK	GER	Maximilian Breunig (at Admira Wacker)

== Pre-season and friendlies ==
Win Draw Loss Fixtures

12 August 2020 Friendly	Union Berlin (Germany)	2–0	(Germany) Würzburger Kickers	Berlin, Germany
15:00 CEST (UTC+2)	Hübner 38'; Teuchert 65'	Report		Stadium: Stadion An der Alten Försterei; Attendance: 0 Referee: Max Burda

15 August 2020 Friendly	Mainz 05 (Germany)	6–0	(Germany) Würzburger Kickers	Mainz, Germany
14:30 CEST (UTC+2)	Szalai 20', 50'; Quaison 22'; Burkardt 35'; Mustapha 94'; Barreiro 111'	Report		Stadium: Stadion am Bruchweg; Attendance: 250; Referee: Nicolas Winter
Note: Match was played in four 30-minute quarters.

22 August 2020 Friendly	LASK (Austria)	Cancelled	(Germany) Würzburger Kickers	Pasching, Austria
17:00 CEST (UTC+2)				Stadium: Raiffeisen Arena

9 October 2020 Friendly	Eintracht Frankfurt (Germany)	0–3	(Germany) Würzburger Kickers	Frankfurt, Germany
14:00 CEST (UTC+2)		Report	Tuta 15' (o.g.); Sontheimer 60', 71'	Stadium: Deutsche Bank Park; Attendance: 0 Referee: Daniel Schlager

15 February 2021 Friendly	FC Augsburg (Germany)	3–1	(Germany) Würzburger Kickers	Augsburg, Germany
14:00 CET (UTC+1)	Vargas 19'; Sarenren Bazee 33'; Douglas 70' (o.g.)	Report	David 2'	Stadium: WWK Arena; Attendance: 0 Referee: Michael Bacher

25 March 2021 Friendly	VfB Stuttgart (Germany)	3–0	(Germany) Würzburger Kickers	Stuttgart, Germany
15:00 CET (UTC+1)	González 38'; Didavi 64' (pen.); Förster 78'	Report		Stadium: Robert-Schlienz-Stadion; Attendance: 0 Referee: Markus Schmidt

== Competitions ==
=== Overview ===
Competition	First match	Last match	Starting round	Final position	Record							
Competition	First match	Last match	Starting round	Final position	Pld	W	D	L	GF	GA	GD	Win %
2. Bundesliga	18 September 2020	23 May 2021	Matchday 1		3	0	1	2	2	6	−4	0.00
DFB-Pokal	14 September 2020		First round	First round	1	0	0	1	2	3	−1	0.00
Total					4	0	1	3	4	9	−5	0.00

Last updated: 4 October 2020
Source: Soccerway

=== 2. Bundesliga ===
==== League table ====
Pos	Team	Pld	W	D	L	GF	GA	GD	Pts	Qualification or relegation
14	Jahn Regensburg	34	9	11	14	37	50	−13	38	
15	SV Sandhausen	34	10	4	20	41	60	−19	34	
16	VfL Osnabrück (R)	34	9	6	19	35	58	−23	33	Qualification for relegation play-offs
17	Eintracht Braunschweig (R)	34	7	10	17	30	59	−29	31	Relegation to 3. Liga
18	Würzburger Kickers (R)	34	6	7	21	37	69	−32	25	Relegation to 3. Liga

Source: DFB
Rules for classification: 1) Points; 2) Goal difference; 3) Goals scored; 4) Head-to-head points; 5) Head-to-head goal difference; 6) Head-to-head away goals scored; 7) Away goals scored; 8) Play-off.
(R) Relegated

==== Results summary ====
Overall								Home						Away					
Pld	W	D	L	GF	GA	GD	Pts	W	D	L	GF	GA	GD	W	D	L	GF	GA	GD
32	5	6	21	34	67	−33	21	3	5	8	21	32	−11	2	1	13	13	35	−22

Last updated: 8 May 2021.
Source: Kicker

==== Results by round ====
Round	1	2	3	4	5	6	7	8	9	10	11	12	13	14	15	16	17	18	19	20	21	22	23	24	25	26	27	28	29	30	31	32	33	34
Ground	H	A	H	H	A	H	A	H	A	H	A	H	A	H	A	H	A	A	H	A	A	H	A	H	A	H	A	H	A	H	A	H	A	H
Result	L	L	D	L	L	L	L	W	L	L	L	D	W	D	L	L	W	L	L	W	L	L	D	L	L	D	L	D	L	L	D	L	W	D
Position	18	18	16	18	18	18	18	18	18	18	18	18	18	18	18	18	18	18	18	18	18	18	18	18	18	18	18	18	18	18	18	18	18	18

Updated to match(es) played on 8 May 2021. Source: DFB
A = Away; H = Home; W = Win; D = Draw; L = Loss

==== Matches ====
The league fixtures were announced on 7 August 2020.

19 September 2020 1	Würzburger Kickers	0–3	Erzgebirge Aue	Würzburg
13:00		Report	60' Strauß; 63' Testroet; 90+2' Baumgart	Stadium: flyeralarm Arena; Attendance: 0 Referee: Thorben Siewer

26 September 2020 2	Fortuna Düsseldorf	1–0	Würzburger Kickers	Düsseldorf
13:00 CEST (UTC+2)	Kownacki 82'	Report		Stadium: Merkur Spiel-Arena; Attendance: 7,500; Referee: Robert Hartmann

4 October 2020 3	Würzburger Kickers	2–2	Greuther Fürth	Würzburg
13:30 CEST (UTC+2)	Herrmann 2'; Baumann 64' (pen.)	Report	Hrgota 26'; Bauer 90+2'	Stadium: flyeralarm Arena; Attendance: 1,877; Referee: Michael Bacher

18 October 2020 4	Würzburger Kickers	0–2	Holstein Kiel	Würzburg
13:30 CEST (UTC+2)		Report	Serra 22', 75'	Stadium: flyeralarm Arena; Attendance: 1,300; Referee: Matthias Jöllenbeck

24 October 2020 5	Hamburger SV	3–1	Würzburger Kickers	Hamburg
13:00 CEST (UTC+2)	Terodde 65', 82'; Leibold 90+2'	Report	Dietz 40'	Stadium: Volksparkstadion; Attendance: 1,000; Referee: Daniel Siebert

1 November 2020 6	Würzburger Kickers	2–3	VfL Bochum	Würzburg
13:30 CET (UTC+1)	Munsy 7'; Sontheimer 35'	Report	Novothny 21'; Soares 32'; Zoller 73'	Stadium: flyeralarm Arena; Attendance: 0 Referee: Martin Thomsen

6 November 2020 7	1. FC Heidenheim	4–1	Würzburger Kickers	Heidenheim
18:30 CET (UTC+1)	Thomalla 41'; Kühlwetter 56'; Leipertz 83'; Kerschbaumer 90+1'	Report	Lotrič 71'	Stadium: Voith-Arena; Attendance: 0 Referee: Robert Kampka

22 November 2020 8	Würzburger Kickers	2–1	Hannover 96	Würzburg
13:30 CET (UTC+1)	Munsy 53'; Kopacz 74'	Report	Ducksch 17'	Stadium: flyeralarm Arena; Attendance: 0 Referee: Nicolas Winter

28 November 2020 9	Jahn Regensburg	2–1	Würzburger Kickers	Regensburg
13:00 CET (UTC+1)	Beste 83'; Stolze 88'	Report	Hansen 90+2'	Stadium: Jahnstadion Regensburg; Attendance: 0 Referee: Florian Heft

6 December 2020 10	Würzburger Kickers	2–3	SV Sandhausen	Würzburg
13:30 CET (UTC+1)	Lotrič 42'; Hägele 88'	Report	Keita-Ruel 18', 70'; Paurević 54'	Stadium: flyeralarm Arena; Attendance: 0 Referee: Sören Storks

13 December 2020 11	1. FC Nürnberg	2–1	Würzburger Kickers	Nuremberg
13:30 CET (UTC+1)	Schäffler 36'; Sörensen 90+2'	Report	Baumann 56'	Stadium: Max-Morlock-Stadion; Attendance: 0 Referee: Daniel Schlager

19 December 2020 13	SV Darmstadt 98	2–0	Würzburger Kickers	Darmstadt
13:00 CET (UTC+1)	Kempe 55'; Platte 90+4'	Report		Stadium: Merck-Stadion am Böllenfalltor; Attendance: 0 Referee: Patrick Ittrich

2 January 2021 14	Würzburger Kickers	2–4	Karlsruher SC	Würzburg
13:00 CET (UTC+1)	Wanitzek 32' (o.g.); Kobale 67' (o.g.)	Report	Goller 12'; Wanitzek 28', 44'; Gondorf 48'	Stadium: flyeralarm Arena; Attendance: 0 Referee: Benjamin Cortus

6 January 2021 12	Würzburger Kickers	1–1	FC St. Pauli	Würzburg
20:30 CET (UTC+1)	Pieringer 9' (pen.)	Report	57' Benatelli	Stadium: flyeralarm Arena; Attendance: 0 Referee: Michael Bacher
Note: COVID-19 pandemic in Germany

9 January 2021 15	VfL Osnabrück	2–3	Würzburger Kickers	Osnabrück
13:00 CET (UTC+1)	Kerk 41'; Ihorst 85'	Report	67', 76' Pieringer; 80' Kopacz	Stadium: Stadion an der Bremer Brücke; Attendance: 0 Referee: Thorben Siewer
Note: COVID-19 pandemic in Germany

15 January 2021 16	Würzburger Kickers	0–0	Eintracht Braunschweig	Würzburg
18:30 CET (UTC+1)		Report		Stadium: flyeralarm Arena; Attendance: 0 Referee: Florian Heft
Note: COVID-19 pandemic in Germany

23 January 2021 17	SC Paderborn 07	1–0	Würzburger Kickers	Paderborn
13:00 CET (UTC+1)	Srbeny 31'	Report		Stadium: Benteler-Arena; Attendance: 0 Referee: Lasse Koslowski
Note: COVID-19 pandemic in Germany

26 January 2021 18	Erzgebirge Aue	2–1	Würzburger Kickers	Aue
18:30 CET (UTC+1)	Krüger 78'; Ballas 85'	Report	52' Munsy	Stadium: Sparkassen-Erzgebirgsstadion; Attendance: 0 Referee: Timo Gerach
Note: COVID-19 pandemic in Germany

29 January 2021 19	Würzburger Kickers	2–1	Fortuna Düsseldorf	Würzburg
18:30 CET (UTC+1)	Munsy 41', 67'	Report	25' Hennings	Stadium: flyeralarm Arena; Attendance: 0 Referee: Markus Schmidt
Note: COVID-19 pandemic in Germany

7 February 2021 20	SpVgg Greuther Fürth	4–1	Würzburger Kickers	Fürth
13.30 CEST	Abiama 28'; Hrgota 50'; Hrgota 80'; Kehr 87'	Report	15' Munsy	Stadium: Sportpark Ronhof; Attendance: 0
Note: COVID-19 pandemic in Germany

12 February 2021 21	Holstein Kiel	1–0	Würzburger Kickers	Kiel
	Mühling 60'	Report		Stadium: Holstein-Stadion

21 February 2021 22	Würzburger Kickers	3–2	Hamburger SV	Würzburg
13.30 CEST	Hasek 19'; Douglas 30'; Sontheimer 50'	Report	72' Dudziak; 89' Wood	Stadium: flyeralarm Arena; Attendance: Note =

27 February 2021 23	VfL Bochum	3–0	Würzburger Kickers	Bochum
13:00 CEST	Žulj 21'; Blum 62'; Gerrit Holtmann 81'	Report		Stadium: Vonovia Ruhrstadion

12 February 2021 24	Würzburger Kickers	1–2	1. FC Heidenheim	Würzburg
18:30 CEST	Kopacz 67'	Report	47' Thomalla; 64' (o.g.) Christian Sthrodiek	Stadium: flyeralarm Arena

8 April 2021 25	Hannover 96	1–2	Würzburger Kickers	Hannover
18.30 CEST	Haraguchi 47'	Report	58' Ronstadt; 81' van la Paara	Stadium: HDI-Arena

26 March 2021 26	Würzburger Kickers	1–1	Jahn Regensburg	Würzburg
13:30 CEST	Munsy 22'	Report	75' Albers	Stadium: flyeralarm Arena

4 April 2021 27	SV Sandhausen	1–0	Würzburger Kickers	Sandhausen
13:30 CEST	Behrens 45'	Report		Stadium: BWT-Stadion am Hardtwald

11 April 2021 28	Würzburger Kickers	1–1	1. FC Nürnberg	Würzburg
13:30 CEST	Dietz 78'	Report	5' Shuranov	Stadium: flyeralarm Arena

17 April 2021 29	FC St. Pauli	4–0	Würzburger Kickers	Hamburg
13:00 CEST	Marmoush 4'; Benatelli 18'; Paqarada 22'; Daniel Kyereh 50'	Report		Stadium: Millerntor-Stadion

20 April 2021 30	Würzburger Kickers	1–3	SV Darmstadt 98	Würzburg
18:30 CEST	Dietz 63'	Report	Dursun 45' Skarke 79' Platte 90'	Stadium: flyeralarm Arena

23 April 2021 31	Karlsruher SC	2–2	Würzburger Kickers	Karlsruhe
18:30 CEST	Choi 26' Kother 45'	Report	Pieringer 36' Dietz {goal|90}}	Stadium: Wildparkstadion

8 May 2021 32	Würzburger Kickers	1–3	VfL Osnabrück	Würzburg
13:00 CEST	Ronstadt 66'	Report	Santos 51' Taffertshofer 79' Reis 85'	Stadium: flyeralarm Arena

16 May 2021 33	Eintracht Braunschweig	1–2	Würzburger Kickers	Braunschweig
15:30 CEST	Ben Balla 79'	Report	Pieringer 2', 19'	Stadium: Eintracht-Stadion

23 May 2021 34	Würzburger Kickers	1–1	SC Paderborn 07	Würzburg
15:30 CEST	Nkaka 46' (o.g.)	Report	Michel 11'	Stadium: flyeralarm Arena

=== DFB-Pokal ===
14 September 2020 First round	Würzburger Kickers	2–3	Hannover 96	Würzburg
18:30 CEST (UTC+2)	Feick 89'; Herrmann 90+5' (pen.)	Report	Weydandt 23'; Kaiser 59'; Hübers 78'	Stadium: Flyeralarm Arena; Attendance: 0 Referee: Patrick Alt
