= Taffertshofer =

Taffertshofer is a surname. Notable people with the surname include:

- Emanuel Taffertshofer (born 1995), German footballer, brother of Ulrich
- Ulrich Taffertshofer (born 1992), German footballer
