= 2015–16 FC Erzgebirge Aue season =

FC Erzgebirge Aue
2015–16 season
- Chairman: Bernd Keller
- Manager: Pavel Dochev
- Stadium: Sparkassen-Erzgebirgsstadion
- 3. Liga: 2nd (promoted)
- DFB-Pokal: Round of 16
Home colours	Away colours	Third colours

The 2015–16 FC Erzgebirge Aue season is the 67th season in the football club's history and 1st season back and 3rd overall season in the third tier of German football, the 3. Liga, having been relegated from the 2. Bundesliga in 2015. The club finished 2nd in the 3. Liga, and were promoted back to the 2. Bundesliga. In addition to the 3. Liga, they participated in the DFB-Pokal, where they were eliminated in the round of 16. It was the 62nd season for the club at the Erzgebirgsstadion, located in Aue, Germany, which has a capacity of 15,690 seats.

== Background ==
In the club's previous season in the 2. Bundesliga, they finished in 17th place, seeing them relegated to the 3. Liga, ending their five-season span in the 2. Bundesliga. In the DFB-Pokal, they went out in Round 2 after losing to RB Leipzig 1–3 after extra time.

== Squad ==
Note: Flags indicate national team as defined under FIFA eligibility rules; some limited exceptions apply. Players may hold more than one non-FIFA nationality.

No.	Pos.	Nation	Player
1	GK	GER	Martin Männel
2	DF	GER	Benedikt Krug
4	DF	GER	Thomas Paulus
5	DF	SVK	Filip Lukšík
6	MF	GER	Philip Hauck
7	MF	NED	Romario Kortzorg
8	MF	GER	Mike Könnecke
9	FW	MNE	Stefan Mugoša (on loan from 1.FC Kaiserslautern)
10	MF	GER	Michael Fink
11	MF	LTU	Arvydas Novikovas
14	FW	NED	Killien Jungen
15	DF	GER	René Klingbeil (captain)
17	DF	GER	Sebastian Hertner
18	DF	GER	Nils Miatke

No.	Pos.	Nation	Player
19	FW	USA	Bobby Wood
20	MF	GER	Oliver Schröder
21	MF	GER	Patrick Schönfeld
22	MF	GER	Rico Benatelli
23	MF	FRA	Dorian Diring
24	DF	ESP	Román Golobart
25	MF	GER	Clemens Fandrich
27	GK	GER	Marius Schulze
28	FW	GER	Felix Kunert
29	DF	AUT	Stipe Vucur
30	MF	GER	Fabian Müller
31	GK	GER	Mario Seidel
33	GK	GER	Sascha Kirschstein
35	MF	GER	Alexander Dartsch
38	MF	TUR	Selçuk Alibaz

== Competitions ==
=== 3. Liga ===
==== League table ====
Pos	Team	Pld	W	D	L	GF	GA	GD	Pts	Promotion, qualification or relegation
1	Dynamo Dresden (C, P)	38	21	15	2	75	35	+40	78	Promotion to 2. Bundesliga and qualification for DFB-Pokal
2	Erzgebirge Aue (P)	38	19	13	6	42	21	+21	70	Promotion to 2. Bundesliga and qualification for DFB-Pokal
3	Würzburger Kickers (O, P)	38	16	16	6	43	25	+18	64	Qualification for promotion play-offs and DFB-Pokal
4	1. FC Magdeburg	38	14	14	10	49	37	+12	56	Qualification for DFB-Pokal
5	VfL Osnabrück	38	14	14	10	46	41	+5	56	

Source: DFB
Rules for classification: 1) Points; 2) Goal difference; 3) Goals scored
(C) Champions; (O) Play-off winners; (P) Promoted

==== Results summary ====
Overall								Home						Away					
Pld	W	D	L	GF	GA	GD	Pts	W	D	L	GF	GA	GD	W	D	L	GF	GA	GD
38	19	13	6	42	21	+21	70	11	8	0	24	4	+20	8	5	6	18	17	+1

==== Results by round ====
Round	1	2	3	4	5	6	7	8	9	10	11	12	13	14	15	16	17	18	19	20	21	22	23	24	25	26	27	28	29	30	31	32	33	34	35	36	37	38
Ground	H	A	H	A	H	A	H	A	H	A	H	A	H	A	H	A	H	H	A	A	H	A	H	A	H	A	H	A	H	A	H	A	H	A	H	A	A	H
Result	D	L	W	W	W	L	D	W	W	D	D	L	D	L	D	W	D	W	W	D	W	D	W	W	D	W	D	D	W	L	W	W	W	L	W	D	W	W
Position	9	18	11	6	3	5	7	6	3	3	4	5	5	9	8	7	6	6	3	3	3	3	2	2	2	2	2	2	2	2	2	2	2	2	2	2	2	2

A = Away; H = Home; W = Win; D = Draw; L = Loss

==== Matches ====
Win	Draw	Loss

Date	Time (Note: Time shown in local time (CEST or CET))	Opponent	Venue	Result (Note: Erzgebirge Aue's score shown first)	Scorers	Attendance	Referee	Ref.
25 July 2015	14:00	VfL Osnabrück	Home	0–0	—	8,800	Kampka	
2 August 2015	14:00	Sonnenhof Großaspach	Away	0–2	—	3,320	Zorn	
15 August 2015	14:00	Stuttgarter Kickers	Home	2–0	Kluft 34', Hertner 86' (pen.)	7,250	Perl	
22 August 2015	14:00	VfB Stuttgart II	Away	2–1	Könnecke 62', Breitkreuz 87'	900	Siewer	
26 August 2015	19:00	VfR Aalen	Home	1–0	Samson 30'	8,000	Koslowski	
29 August 2015	14:00	Würzburger Kickers	Away	0–1	—	5,359	Schriever	
5 September 2015	14:00	Hansa Rostock	Home	0–0	—	10,850	Drees	
12 September 2015	14:00	Rot-Weiß Erfurt	Away	1–0	Wegner 89' (pen.)	6,431	Mix	
18 September 2015	20:30	Energie Cottbus	Home	1–0	Adler 32'	9,550	Badstübner	
22 September 2015	18:30	Mainz 05 II	Away	1–1	Wegner 33'	1,036	Pfeifer	
26 September 2015	14:00	Holstein Kiel	Home	0–0	—	6,700	Koslowski	
3 October 2015	14:00	Hallescher FC	Away	0–1	—	9,030	Steinhaus	
18 October 2015	14:00	1. FC Magdeburg	Home	0–0	—	10,050	Stark	
23 October 2015	19:00	Werder Bremen II	Away	0–4	—	850	Jöllenbeck	
30 October 2015	19:00	Wehen Wiesbaden	Home	1–1	Breitkreuz 90+2'	6,350	Kempkes	
7 November 2015	14:00	Chemnitzer FC	Away	2–1	Wegner 38', Adler 40'	12,300	Thomsen	
21 November 2015	14:00	Dynamo Dresden	Home	1–1	Breitkreuz 73'	15,000	Schriever	
29 November 2015	14:00	Fortuna Köln	Home	2–0	Skarlatidis 23', Adler 31'	6,500	Koslowski	
5 December 2015	14:00	Preußen Münster	Away	1–0	Riese 66'	6,490	Bokop	
12 December 2015	14:00	VfL Osnabrück	Away	0–0	—	8,444	Sippel	
19 December 2015	14:00	Sonnenhof Großaspach	Home	2–0	Handle 68', Adler 90'	7,000	Schlager	
22 January 2016	19:00	Stuttgarter Kickers	Away	1–1	Breitkreuz 90+3'	3,800	Dankert	
30 January 2016	14:00	VfB Stuttgart II	Home	1–0	Kvesić 54' (pen.)	6,050	Dietz	
5 February 2016	19:00	VfR Aalen	Away	2–0	Soukou 60', Breitkreuz 84'	4,695	Osmers	
14 February 2016	14:00	Würzburger Kickers	Home	0–0	—	6,000	Skorczyk	
20 February 2016	14:00	Hansa Rostock	Away	2–0	Adler 18', Wegner 50'	11,000	Ittrich	
28 February 2016	14:00	Rot-Weiß Erfurt	Home	2–2	Soukou 5', Köpke 78'	8,100	Brand	
2 March 2016	18:30	Energie Cottbus	Away	0–0	—	6,047	Bläser	
6 March 2016	14:00	Mainz 05 II	Home	1–0	Kvesić 62' (pen.)	6,200	Pfeifer	
12 March 2016	14:00	Holstein Kiel	Away	0–3	—	4,417	Kempter	
18 March 2016	17:30	Hallescher FC	Home	4–0	Köpke 33', 48', 74', Kvesić 69'	8,100	Stieler	
1 April 2016	20:30	1. FC Magdeburg	Away	3–0	Köpke 18', 38', Skarlatidis 44'	21,812	Winkmann	
9 April 2016	14:00	Werder Bremen II	Home	1–0	Adler 57'	8,400	Kornblum	
15 April 2016	19:00	Wehen Wiesbaden	Away	0–1	—	3,070	Gerach	
24 April 2016	14:00	Chemnitzer FC	Home	2–0	Köpke 8', Skarlatidis 82'	10,000	Osmers	
30 April 2016	14:00	Dynamo Dresden	Away	1–1	Kvesić 66'	29,653	Schmidt	
7 May 2016	13:30	Fortuna Köln	Away	2–0	Riese 11' (pen.), Köpke 54'	3,845	Schult	
14 May 2016	13:45	Preußen Münster	Home	3–0	Köpke 15', 83', Skarlatidis 41'	9,000	Fritz	

=== DFB-Pokal ===
Win	Draw	Loss

Round	Date	Time	Opponent	Venue	Result	Scorers	Attendance	Referee	Ref.
First round	8 August 2015	15:30	Greuther Fürth	Home	1–0	Skarlatidis 68'	6,000	Schröder	
Second round	27 October 2015	19:00	Eintracht Frankfurt	Home	1–0	Wegner 74'	10,750	Hartmann	
Round of 16	15 December 2015	20:30	1. FC Heidenheim	Home	0–2	—	8,250	Winkmann	
