= 2017–18 FC Erzgebirge Aue season =

Erzgebirge Aue
2017–18 season
- Chairman: Helge Leonhardt
- Manager: Hannes Drews
- Stadium: Erzgebirgsstadion
- 2. Bundesliga: 16th
- DFB-Pokal: First round
- Top goalscorer: League: Pascal Köpke (10); All: Pascal Köpke (10)
- Highest home attendance: 15,000 vs Dynamo Dresden, 2. Bundesliga, 6 May 2018
- Lowest home attendance: 6,400 vs Darmstadt 98, 2. Bundesliga, 8 December 2017
- Average home league attendance: 9,071
Home colours	Away colours	Third colours

The 2017–18 FC Erzgebirge Aue season is the 72nd season in the football club's history. The season covers a period from 1 July 2017 to 30 June 2018.

== Players ==
=== Squad information ===
As of 30 January 2018

Note: Flags indicate national team as defined under FIFA eligibility rules; some limited exceptions apply. Players may hold more than one non-FIFA nationality.

No.	Pos.	Nation	Player
1	GK	GER	Martin Männel (captain)
3	DF	GER	Sebastian Hertner
4	DF	GER	Fabian Kalig
5	MF	GER	Clemens Fandrich
6	MF	MNE	Mirnes Pepić
8	FW	GER	Nicky Adler
10	FW	AZE	Dimitrij Nazarov
14	FW	GER	Pascal Köpke
15	DF	GER	Dennis Kempe
16	MF	BIH	Mario Kvesić
17	MF	GER	Philipp Riese
18	MF	GER	Nicolai Rapp
19	MF	GER	Cebio Soukou
20	DF	GER	Calogero Rizzuto

No.	Pos.	Nation	Player
21	DF	GER	Malcolm Cacutalua
22	FW	COD	Ridge Munsy
23	FW	GER	Sören Bertram
24	MF	GER	John-Patrick Strauß
25	MF	AUT	Dominik Wydra
26	GK	GER	Robert Jendrusch
27	DF	GER	Sascha Härtel
28	FW	GER	Vincent Michl
29	MF	GER	Tommy Käßemodel
33	MF	GER	Christian Tiffert
34	GK	GER	Daniel Haas
37	DF	GER	Moise Ngwisani
40	FW	KOS	Albert Bunjaku

== Friendly matches ==
Win Draw Loss

24 June 2017	FSV Treuen	0–25	Erzgebirge Aue
14:30		Report

25 June 2017	Saxonia Bernsbach	0–24	Erzgebirge Aue
14:00		Report

1 July 2017	Hertha BSC II	0–5	Erzgebirge Aue
17:00		Report

8 July 2017	Erzgebirge Aue	1–2	LASK Linz
18:00		Report

12 July 2017	Erzgebirge Aue	0–1	Slovan Liberec
18:00		Report

16 July 2017	1. FC Magdeburg	1–0	Erzgebirge Aue
15:00		Report

23 July 2017	Erzgebirge Aue	1–1	Antalyaspor
15:30		Report

24 July 2017	VfB Auerbach	1–1	Erzgebirge Aue	Auerbach
17:15	Zimmermann 62'	Report	Kaufmann 32'	Stadium: VfB Stadion; Attendance: 1,020; Referee: Stefan Prager

31 August 2017	VfL Wolfsburg	3–0	Erzgebirge Aue	Wolfsburg
15:30		Report		Stadium: Trainingsgelände am VfL-Center

7 October 2017	Erzgebirge Aue	3–1	Dukla Prague
13:30		Report

11 November 2017	VFC Plauen	1–2	Erzgebirge Aue
13:00		Summary

6 January 2018	Eintracht Frankfurt	3–1	Erzgebirge Aue
15:00	Haller 52'; Hrgota 66'; Gaćinović 90'	Report	Maria 108'
Note: 3x45 minutes

10 January 2018	Erzgebirge Aue	0–2	K.V. Oostende	Aue
15:00 CET		Report	Bushiri 18'; Capon 39'	Stadium: Erzgebirgsstadion

16 January 2018	Erzgebirge Aue	0–1	Rot-Weiß Erfurt	Aue
18:00 CET		Report	Rapp 76' (o.g.)	Stadium: Erzgebirgsstadion

23 March 2018	Erzgebirge Aue	4–4	Mladá Boleslav	Aue
15:00		Report		Stadium: Erzgebirgsstadion

== Competitions ==
Win Draw Loss

=== 2. Bundesliga ===
==== League table ====
Pos	Team	Pld	W	D	L	GF	GA	GD	Pts	Promotion, qualification or relegation
14	Dynamo Dresden	34	11	8	15	42	52	−10	41	
15	Greuther Fürth	34	10	10	14	37	48	−11	40	
16	Erzgebirge Aue (O)	34	10	10	14	35	49	−14	40	Qualification for relegation play-offs
17	Eintracht Braunschweig (R)	34	8	15	11	37	43	−6	39	Relegation to 3. Liga
18	1. FC Kaiserslautern (R)	34	9	8	17	42	55	−13	35	Relegation to 3. Liga

Source: DFB
Rules for classification: 1) Points; 2) Goal difference; 3) Goals scored
(O) Play-off winners; (R) Relegated

==== Results summary ====
Overall								Home						Away					
Pld	W	D	L	GF	GA	GD	Pts	W	D	L	GF	GA	GD	W	D	L	GF	GA	GD
33	10	10	13	35	48	−13	40	7	5	5	18	20	−2	3	5	8	17	28	−11

Last updated: 6 May 2018.

==== Results by round ====
Matchday	1	2	3	4	5	6	7	8	9	10	11	12	13	14	15	16	17	18	19	20	21	22	23	24	25	26	27	28	29	30	31	32	33	34
Ground	H	A	A	H	A	H	A	H	H	A	H	A	H	A	H	A	H	H	A	H	A	H	A	H	A	A	H	A	H	A	H	A	H	A
Result	L	L	D	W	W	L	W	W	L	L	W	D	D	L	D	L	W	D	L	L	L	D	D	W	D	D	W	W	W	L	L	L	D	L
Position	16	16	15	10	10	10	10	10	10	10	8	10	10	10	10	13	13	13	14	15	15	15	15	15	15	15	14	14	14	15	15	15	15	16

Updated to match(es) played on 6 May 2018. Source:
A = Away; H = Home; W = Win; D = Draw; L = Loss

==== Matches ====
30 July 2017 1	1. FC Heidenheim	v	Erzgebirge Aue	Heidenheim an der Brenz
				Stadium: Voith-Arena
Note: Match postponed due to severe weather.

6 August 2017 2	Erzgebirge Aue	0–2	Fortuna Düsseldorf	Aue
15:30	Kempe (yellow card) 22'; Nazarov (yellow card) 44'; Kalig (yellow card) 52'; Rizzuto (yellow card) 70'; Köpke (yellow card) 76'	Report	Hennings 42'; Sobottka 48'; Hoffmann (yellow card) 58'; Bebou (yellow card) 87'	Stadium: Erzgebirgsstadion; Attendance: 9,150; Referee: (Germany) Felix Brych

9 August 2017 1	1. FC Heidenheim	2–1	Erzgebirge Aue	Heidenheim an der Brenz
20:00	Thiel 22'; Wittek (yellow card) 65'; Titsch-Rivero 82'; Griesbeck (yellow card) 86'	Report	Rizzuto (yellow card) 11'; Soukou 31'; Kempe (yellow card) 37' (yellow-red card)	Stadium: Voith-Arena; Attendance: 10,500; Referee: (Germany) Florian Badstübner

18 August 2017 3	Eintracht Braunschweig	1–1	Erzgebirge Aue	Braunschweig
18:30	Khelifi 26'; Nyman (yellow card) 35'; Zuck (yellow card) 50'	Report	Nazarov 24'; Tiffert (yellow card) 37'; Kalig (yellow card) 43'; Riese (yellow card) 69'; Rizzuto (yellow card) 83'	Stadium: Eintracht-Stadion; Attendance: 20,300; Referee: (Germany) René Rohde

26 August 2017 4	Erzgebirge Aue	3–1	1. FC Nürnberg	Aue
13:00	Tiffert (yellow card) 26'; Wydra 60'; Nazarov 73'; Köpke 77'; Kalig (yellow card) 84'; Hertner (yellow card) 84'	Report	Teuchert (yellow card) 29'; Möhwald 87'; Leibold (yellow card) 89'	Stadium: Erzgebirgsstadion; Attendance: 9,000; Referee: (Germany) Lasse Koslowski

9 September 2017 5	FC Ingolstadt 04	1–2	Erzgebirge Aue	Ingolstadt
13:00	Lezcano (yellow card) 55' (goal) 84'; Gaus (yellow card) 78'	Report	Köpke 15'; Bertram 50'; Rizzuto (yellow card) 55'; Fandrich (yellow card) 73'; Kempe (yellow card) 78'	Stadium: Audi Sportpark; Attendance: 10,176; Referee: (Germany) Tobias Reichel

15 September 2017 6	Erzgebirge Aue	0–3	Holstein Kiel	Aue
18:30	Rapp (yellow card) 19'; Nazarov (yellow card) 55'; Riese (yellow card) 69'	Report	Mühling 15'; Ducksch 41' 77'; Heidinger (yellow card) 84'; Peitz (yellow card) 87'	Stadium: Erzgebirgsstadion; Attendance: 8,000; Referee: (Germany) Tobias Stieler

19 September 2017 7	1. FC Kaiserslautern	0–2	Erzgebirge Aue	Kaiserslautern
18:30	Guwara (yellow card) 40'; Spalvis (yellow card) 85'	Report	Bertram 30' 48'; Kalig (yellow card) 44'; Fandrich (yellow card) 56'	Stadium: Fritz-Walter-Stadion; Attendance: 16,613; Referee: (Germany) Martin Thomsen

22 September 2017 8	Erzgebirge Aue	1–0	Sandhausen	Aue
18:30	Köpke 17'; Wydra (yellow card) 85'	Report	Sukuta-Pasu (yellow card) 77'; Kister (yellow card) 89'	Stadium: Erzgebirgsstadion; Attendance: 6,800; Referee: (Germany) Thorben Siewer

30 September 2017 9	Erzgebirge Aue	1–2	Union Berlin	Aue
13:00	Bertram 73'	Report	Hartel 55'; Polter 70'; Gogia (yellow card) 90+1'	Stadium: Erzgebirgsstadion; Attendance: 9,450; Referee: (Germany) Benjamin Cortus

15 October 2017 10	Greuther Fürth	2–1	Erzgebirge Aue	Fürth
13:30	Manuel Torres (yellow card) 31'; Gjasula (yellow card) 39'; Narey 40'; Ayçiçek (yellow card) 75'; Steininger 87'	Report	Kalig (yellow card) 26'; Hertner (yellow card) 42'; Köpke (yellow card) 64'; Bunjaku 78'; Rapp (yellow card) 81'	Stadium: Sportpark Ronhof Thomas Sommer; Attendance: 9,510; Referee: (Germany) René Rohde

22 October 2017 11	Erzgebirge Aue	1–0	Jahn Regensburg	Aue
13:30	Kempe (yellow card) 13'; Nazarov (red card) 20'; Rapp (yellow card) 41'; Tiffert (yellow card) 45+2'; Kvesić 59'	Report	Sørensen (yellow card) 27'; Nandzik (yellow card) 49'; Adamyan (yellow card) 75'	Stadium: Erzgebirgsstadion; Attendance: 7,550; Referee: (Germany) Sven Waschitzki

27 October 2017 12	FC St Pauli	1–1	Erzgebirge Aue	St. Pauli
18:30	Dudziak 33'; Buchtmann (yellow card) 89'	Report	Wydra (yellow card) 15'; Kempe 69' (yellow card) 87'; Rizzuto (yellow card) 89'	Stadium: Millerntor-Stadion; Attendance: 28,742; Referee: (Germany) Benedikt Kempkes

5 November 2017 13	Erzgebirge Aue	1–1	Arminia Bielefeld	Aue
13:30	Rapp (yellow card) 10'; Kvesić 45+1' (pen.); Männel (yellow card) 78'	Report	Kerschbaumer (yellow card) 30'; Salger (yellow card) 80'; Voglsammer 90+1' (yellow card) 90+1'; Börner (yellow card) 90+3'	Stadium: Erzgebirgsstadion; Attendance: 7,500; Referee: (Germany) Christof Günsch

19 November 2017 14	MSV Duisburg	3–0	Erzgebirge Aue	Duisburg
13:30	Cauly 50' 54'; Fröde (yellow card) 56'; Tashchy 85'	Report	Kalig (yellow card) 60'; Wydra (yellow card) 76'; Kempe (yellow card) 84'	Stadium: Schauinsland-Reisen-Arena; Attendance: 13,309; Referee: (Germany) Robert Kempter

26 November 2017 15	Erzgebirge Aue	1–1	Bochum	Aue
13:30	Fandrich 4' (yellow card) 70'	Report	Bastians 39'; Kruse (yellow card) 41'; Janelt (yellow card) 45+1'; Danilo Soares (yellow card) 59'	Stadium: Erzgebirgsstadion; Attendance: 7,200; Referee: (Germany) Robert Schröder

3 December 2017 16	Dynamo Dresden	4–0	Erzgebirge Aue	Dresden
13:30	Röser 21'; Benatelli 44'; Ballas 47' (yellow card) 67'; Hartmann (yellow card) 73'; Berko 75'	Report	Riese (yellow card) 35'; Rapp (yellow card) 62'	Stadium: DDV-Stadion; Attendance: 30,453; Referee: (Germany) Manuel Gräfe

8 December 2017 17	Erzgebirge Aue	1–0	Darmstadt 98	Aue
18:30	Soukou 35'	Report	Steinhöfer (yellow card) 13'; Sulu (yellow card) 50'; Sobiech (yellow card) 89'; Stark (yellow card) 90+4'	Stadium: Erzgebirgsstadion; Attendance: 6,400; Referee: (Germany) Florian Heft

16 December 2017 18	Erzgebirge Aue	1–1	1. FC Heidenheim	Aue
13:00 CET	Soukou 8'; Tiffert (yellow card) 55'	Report	Titsch-Rivero (yellow card) 64'; Wittek (yellow card) 71'; Verhoek (yellow card) 73' (goal) 90+1'; Griesbeck (yellow card) 76'	Stadium: Erzgebirgsstadion; Attendance: 6,500; Referee: (Germany) Sascha Stegemann

24 January 2018 19	Fortuna Düsseldorf	2–1	Erzgebirge Aue	Düsseldorf
20:30 CET	Raman 30'; Bodzek (yellow card) 45+1'; Hennings (yellow card) 56' (goal) 70' (pen.)	Report	Munsy 63'; Strauß (yellow card) 67'; Cacutalua (yellow card) 68'	Stadium: Esprit Arena; Attendance: 19,617; Referee: (Germany) Florian Badstübner

28 January 2018 20	Erzgebirge Aue	1–3	Eintracht Braunschweig	Aue
13:30 CET	Köpke 12'; Strauß (yellow card) 58'; Wydra (yellow card) 81'; Rapp (yellow card) 90'	Report	Abdullahi 13', 71' (yellow card) 73'; Kumbela 35'; Schönfeld (yellow card) 67'; Hofmann (yellow card) 69'	Stadium: Erzgebirgsstadion; Attendance: 8,500; Referee: Christof Günsch

2 February 2018 21	1. FC Nürnberg	4–1	Erzgebirge Aue	Nuremberg
18:30 CET	Möhwald 37', 47'; Erras 71'; Werner 76'	Report	Soukou 72'	Stadium: Max-Morlock-Stadion; Attendance: 24,451; Referee: Johann Pfeifer

11 February 2018 22	Erzgebirge Aue	0–0	FC Ingolstadt 04	Aue
13:30 CET	Kalig (yellow card) 70'	Report	Gaus (yellow card) 35'; Lezcano (yellow card) 84'	Stadium: Erzgebirgsstadion; Attendance: 6,850; Referee: Robert Schröder

17 February 2018 23	Holstein Kiel	2–2	Erzgebirge Aue	Kiel
13:00 CET	Heidinger (yellow card) 1'; Ducksch 12'; Drexler 25'	Report	Cacutalua 36', 38'; Köpke (yellow card) 67'; Fandrich (yellow card) 71'	Stadium: Holstein-Stadion; Attendance: 9,702; Referee: Daniel Schlager

24 February 2018 24	Erzgebirge Aue	2–1	1. FC Kaiserslautern	Aue
13:00 CET	Köpke 2'; Munsy 63'; Nazarov (yellow card) 66'; Rizzuto (yellow card) 75'	Report	Vučur 67'; Ziegler (yellow card) 89'	Stadium: Erzgebirgsstadion; Attendance: 8,500; Referee: Christian Dietz

3 March 2018 25	Sandhausen	1–1	Erzgebirge Aue	Sandhausen
13:00 CET	Knipping (yellow card) 19'; Gíslason 69'	Report	Rizzuto (yellow card) 6'; Fandrich (yellow card) 30'; Köpke 54'; Kempe (yellow card) 89'	Stadium: BWT-Stadion am Hardtwald; Attendance: 5,160; Referee: Patrick Alt

11 March 2018 26	Union Berlin	0–0	Erzgebirge Aue	Berlin
13:30 CET	Kroos (yellow card) 70'	Report	Wydra (yellow card) 52'; Kvesić (yellow card) 55'; Kalig (yellow card) 90+2'	Stadium: Stadion An der Alten Försterei; Attendance: 21,788; Referee: Martin Petersen

19 March 2018 27	Erzgebirge Aue	2–1	Greuther Fürth	Aue
20:30 CET	Köpke 34'; Cacutalua 42'	Report	Maloča (yellow card) 64'; Narey 86'	Stadium: Erzgebirgsstadion; Attendance: 8,700; Referee: Tobias Welz

1 April 2018 28	Jahn Regensburg	1–3	Erzgebirge Aue	Regensburg
13:30 CEST	Gimber (yellow card) 35'; Nandzik (yellow card) 43'; Knoll 50'; Sørensen (yellow card) 77'; Grüttner (yellow card) 78'	Report	Kalig (yellow card) 15'; Köpke 27', 57'; Munsy 43'; Rizzuto (yellow card) 53'; Männel (yellow card) 74'	Stadium: Continental Arena; Attendance: 11,707; Referee: Robert Kempter

7 April 2018 29	Erzgebirge Aue	2–1	FC St. Pauli	Aue
13:00 CEST	Fandrich 25'; Hertner (yellow card) 69'; Kvesić 82' (pen.); Rizzuto (yellow card) 86'	Report	Dudziak (yellow card) 38'; Bouhaddouz 44', (yellow card) 90+3'; Buchtmann (yellow card) 56'; Buballa (yellow card) 81'	Stadium: Erzgebirgsstadion; Attendance: 14,700; Referee: Christof Günsch

14 April 2018 30	Arminia Bielefeld	2–0	Erzgebirge Aue	Bielefeld
13:00 CEST	Börner (yellow card) 29'; Voglsammer 42'; Weigelt (yellow card) 54'; Klos 69'; Kerschbaumer (yellow card) 77'	Report	Riese (yellow card) 66'	Stadium: Bielefelder Alm; Attendance: 16,605; Referee: Arne Aarnink

22 April 2018 31	Erzgebirge Aue	1–3	MSV Duisburg	Aue
13:30 CEST	Riese (yellow card) 33'; Rizzuto (yellow card) 55'; Nazarov 83'	Report	Wolze 56' (pen.), 90+1' (pen.); Illjutcenko (yellow card) 59'; Tashchy 64'; Wiegel (yellow card) 86'	Stadium: Erzgebirgsstadion; Attendance: 11,950; Referee: Lasse Koslowski

29 April 2018 32	VfL Bochum	2–1	Erzgebirge Aue	Bochum
18:30 CEST	Kruse 3', 77'; Stöger (yellow card) 50'	Report	Köpke 16'; Cacutalua (yellow card) 27'; Kempe (red card) 65'; Fandrich (yellow card) 75'	Stadium: Ruhrstadion; Attendance: 20,121; Referee: Daniel Schlager

6 May 2018 33	Erzgebirge Aue	0–0	Dynamo Dresden	Aue
15:30 CEST	Kalig (yellow card) 16'; Rizzuto (yellow card) 84'	Report	Berko (yellow card) 19'; Kreuzer (yellow card) 45+1'; Mlapa (yellow card) 85'	Stadium: Erzgebirgsstadion; Attendance: 15,000; Referee: Frank Willenborg

13 May 2018 34	Darmstadt 98	1–0	Erzgebirge Aue	Darmstadt
15:30 CEST	Holland (yellow card) 72'; Kempe 86'	Report	Köpke (yellow card) 64'; Fandrich (yellow card) 81'	Stadium: Merck-Stadion am Böllenfalltor; Attendance: 17,400; Referee: Sören Storks

=== DFB-Pokal ===
13 August 2017 Round 1	Wehen Wiesbaden	2–0	Erzgebirge Aue	Wiesbaden
18:30	Blacha 4'; Andrist 7'; Ruprecht (yellow card) 54'; Mintzel (yellow card) 63'	Report	Kempe (yellow card) 37'; Nazarov (yellow card) 84'	Stadium: Brita-Arena; Attendance: 2,500; Referee: (Germany) Frank Willenborg

== Player statistics ==
=== Appearances and goals ===
No.	Pos	Nat	Player	Total		2. Bundesliga		DFB-Pokal	
No.	Pos	Nat	Player	Apps	Goals	Apps	Goals	Apps	Goals
1	GK	(Germany) GER	Martin Männel	35	0	34	0	1	0
3	DF	(Germany) GER	Sebastian Hertner	26	0	25	0	1	0
4	DF	(Germany) GER	Fabian Kalig	32	0	31	0	1	0
5	MF	(Germany) GER	Clemens Fandrich	31	2	30	2	1	0
6	MF	(Montenegro) MNE	Mirnes Pepić	0	0	0	0	0	0
8	FW	(Germany) GER	Nicky Adler	0	0	0	0	0	0
9	MF	(Germany) GER	Arianit Ferati	5	0	4	0	1	0
10	FW	(Azerbaijan) AZE	Dimitrij Nazarov	31	3	30	3	1	0
11	DF	(Curaçao) CUW	Michaël Maria	2	0	1	0	1	0
14	FW	(Germany) GER	Pascal Köpke	35	10	34	10	1	0
15	DF	(Germany) GER	Dennis Kempe	26	1	25	1	1	0
16	MF	(Bosnia and Herzegovina) BIH	Mario Kvesic	19	3	19	3	0	0
17	MF	(Germany) GER	Philipp Riese	20	0	20	0	0	0
18	DF	(Germany) GER	Nicolai Rapp	22	0	21	0	1	0
19	MF	(Benin) BEN	Cebio Soukou	15	4	14	4	1	0
20	DF	(Germany) GER	Calogero Rizzuto	28	0	28	0	0	0
21	DF	(Germany) GER	Malcolm Cacutalua	25	3	25	3	0	0
22	MF	(Germany) GER	Fabio Kaufmann	1	0	0	0	1	0
22	FW	(Democratic Republic of the Congo) COD	Ridge Munsy	16	3	16	3	0	0
23	MF	(Germany) GER	Sören Bertram	23	4	23	4	0	0
24	MF	(Philippines) PHI	John-Patrick Strauß	15	0	15	0	0	0
25	MF	(Austria) AUT	Dominik Wydra	30	1	29	1	1	0
26	GK	(Germany) GER	Robert Jendrusch	0	0	0	0	0	0
27	DF	(Germany) GER	Sascha Härtel	0	0	0	0	0	0
28	FW	(Germany) GER	Vincent Michl	0	0	0	0	0	0
29	MF	(Germany) GER	Tommy Käßemodel	0	0	0	0	0	0
33	MF	(Germany) GER	Christian Tiffert	34	0	33	0	1	0
34	GK	(Germany) GER	Daniel Haas	0	0	0	0	0	0
37	DF	(Democratic Republic of the Congo) COD	Moise Ngwisani	0	0	0	0	0	0
40	FW	(Kosovo) KOS	Albert Bunjaku	14	1	14	1	0	0
