= Pascal Köpke =

German footballer

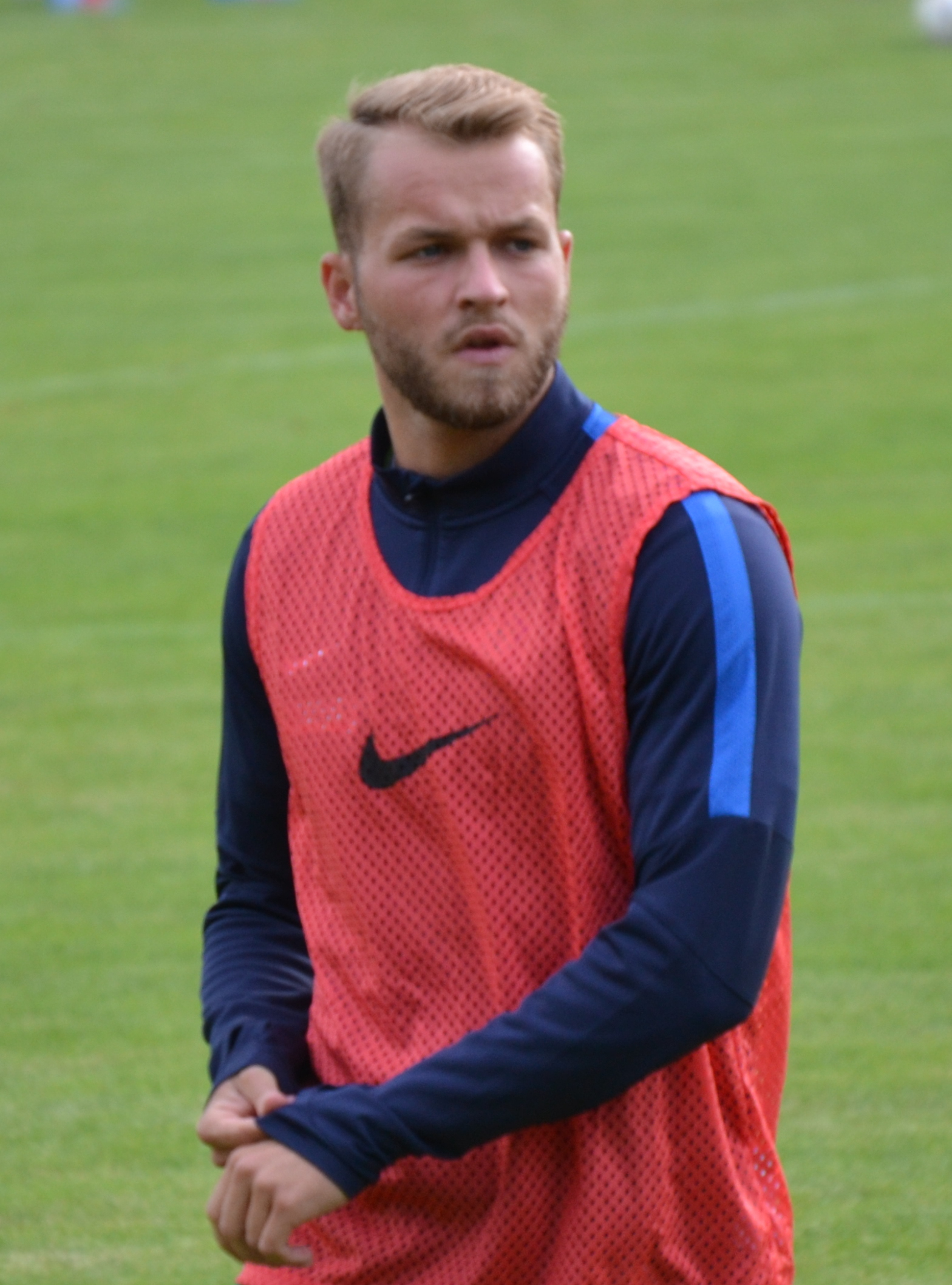
- Köpke with Erzgebirge Aue in 2016

Personal information
- Date of birth: 3 September 1995 (age 31)
- Place of birth: Hanau, Germany
- Height: 1.75 m (5 ft 9 in)
- Position: Forward

Youth career
- 1998–1999: ASV Herzogenaurach
- 1999–2003: 1. FC Herzogenaurach
- 2003–2013: 1. FC Nürnberg

Senior career*
Years	Team	Apps	(Gls)
2013–2014	SpVgg Unterhaching II	7	(2)
2013–2015	SpVgg Unterhaching	36	(13)
2015–2016	Karlsruher SC	4	(0)
2015–2016	Karlsruher SC II	4	(4)
2016	→ Erzgebirge Aue (loan)	14	(10)
2016–2018	Erzgebirge Aue	67	(20)
2018–2020	Hertha BSC II	5	(1)
2018–2020	Hertha BSC	11	(0)
2020–2023	1. FC Nürnberg	30	(5)
2023–2024	MSV Duisburg	7	(0)

International career
2014–2015	Germany U20	6	(0)
- * Club domestic league appearances and goals as of 19:08, 27 September 2023 (UTC)

Pascal Köpke (born 3 September 1995) is a German professional footballer who plays as a forward. He is the son of former German international goalkeeper Andreas Köpke.

== Club career ==
Köpke spent ten years in 1. FC Nürnberg's youth team, before joining SpVgg Unterhaching in July 2013. Four months later he made his debut for the club as a substitute for Marius Duhnke in a 3. Liga match against VfB Stuttgart II, scoring the fourth goal in a 4–0 win. The goal – an overhead kick – was voted as goal of the month for November 2013.

In June 2018, Hertha BSC announced Köpke would join for the 2018–19 season, reportedly signing a four-year contract until 2022, after previously having been on the verge of a move to Hannover 96.

On 29 August 2020, Köpke returned to 1. FC Nürnberg. After three years in Nürnberg, he moved to MSV Duisburg for the 2023–24 season.

== Career statistics ==
As of matches played on 27 September 2023

Appearances and goals by club, season and competition
Club	Season	League			Cup		Other		Total	
Club	Season	Division	Apps	Goals	Apps	Goals	Apps	Goals	Apps	Goals
SpVgg Unterhaching	2013–14	3. Liga	5	2	—		—		5	2
SpVgg Unterhaching	2014–15	3. Liga	31	11	—		—		31	11
SpVgg Unterhaching	Total		36	13	0	0	0	0	36	13
SpVgg Unterhaching II	2013–14	Bayernliga	7	2	—		—		7	2
Karlsruher SC	2015–16	2. Bundesliga	4	0	0	0	—		4	0
Karlsruher SC II	2015–16	Oberliga Baden-Württemberg	4	4	—		—		4	4
Erzgebirge Aue	2015–16	3. Liga	14	10	0	0	—		14	10
Erzgebirge Aue	2016–17	2. Bundesliga	33	10	1	0	—		34	10
Erzgebirge Aue	2017–18	2. Bundesliga	34	10	1	0	2	0	37	10
Erzgebirge Aue	Total		81	30	2	0	2	0	85	30
Hertha BSC	2018–19	Bundesliga	7	0	1	0	—		8	0
Hertha BSC	2019–20	Bundesliga	4	0	1	1	—		5	1
Hertha BSC	Total		11	0	2	1	0	0	13	1
Hertha BSC II	2018–19	Regionalliga Nordost	4	1	—		—		4	1
Hertha BSC II	2019–20	Regionalliga Nordost	1	0	—		—		1	0
Hertha BSC II	Total		5	1	0	0	0	0	5	1
1. FC Nürnberg	2020–21	2. Bundesliga	7	2	1	0	—		8	2
1. FC Nürnberg	2021–22	2. Bundesliga	16	3	0	0	—		16	3
1. FC Nürnberg	2022–23	2. Bundesliga	7	0	0	0	—		7	0
1. FC Nürnberg	Total		30	5	1	0	0	0	31	5
MSV Duisburg	2023–24	3. Liga	7	0	—		—		7	0
Career total			185	55	5	1	2	0	192	56
