= Ridge Munsy =

Swiss professional footballer (born 1989)

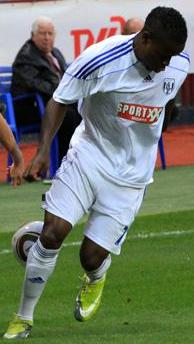
- Munsy in 2010

Personal information
- Date of birth: 9 July 1989 (age 37)
- Place of birth: Lucerne, Switzerland
- Height: 1.88 m (6 ft 2 in)
- Position: Forward

Youth career
- FC Luzern

Senior career*
| Years | Team | Apps | (Gls) |
| 2007–2010 | FC Luzern | 7 | (0) |
| 2008–2010 | FC Luzern | 66 | (24) |
| 2010–2011 | Lausanne-Sport | 10 | (2) |
| 2011 | → Yverdon-Sport (loan) | 10 | (1) |
| 2011–2015 | SC Kriens | 91 | (43) |
| 2015–2016 | Thun | 50 | (11) |
| 2016–2019 | Grasshoppers | 42 | (6) |
| 2018 | → Erzgebirge Aue (loan) | 16 | (3) |
| 2018–2019 | → BB Erzurumspor (loan) | 12 | (0) |
| 2019–2020 | Thun | 29 | (13) |
| 2020–2021 | Würzburger Kickers | 27 | (7) |
| 2021–2023 | Hansa Rostock | 29 | (1) |
| 2024 | Schaffhausen | 18 | (2) |
- * Club domestic league appearances and goals

Ridge Munsy (born 9 July 1989) is a Swiss former professional footballer who played as a forward. He is of Congolese descent.

== Career ==
Munsy played for FC Luzern's senior side during the second half of the 2007 season, making seven league appearances before returning to the youth side. He transferred to Lausanne-Sport in July 2010. In 2011, he was transferred to SC Kriens, playing at the club for four years.

In January 2015, Munsy moved to Swiss Super League side FC Thun.

On 27 January 2024, Munsy signed with Schaffhausen.

On 17 June 2024, he announced his retirement from professional football.

== Career statistics ==
As of match played 24 July 2021

Appearances and goals by club, season and competition
| Club | Season | League | | | National Cup | | Europe | | Other | | Total | |
| Club | Season | Division | Apps | Goals | Apps | Goals | Apps | Goals | Apps | Goals | Apps | Goals |
|---|---|---|---|---|---|---|---|---|---|---|---|---|
| Lausanne-Sport | 2010–11 | Swiss Challenge League | 10 | 2 | 0 | 0 | 7 (Note: Appearances in the Europa League) | 0 | – | | 17 | 2 |
| Yverdon Sport (loan) | 2010–11 | Swiss Challenge League | 10 | 1 | 0 | 0 | — | | – | | 10 | 1 |
| SC Kriens | 2011–12 | Swiss Challenge League | 21 | 1 | 1 | 0 | — | | – | | 22 | 1 |
| SC Kriens | 2012–13 | 1. Liga Promotion | | | | | | | | | | |
| SC Kriens | 2013–14 | | | | | | | | | | | |
| SC Kriens | Total | | 21 | 1 | 1 | 0 | 0 | 0 | 0 | 0 | 22 | 1 |
| Thun | 2014–15 | Swiss Super League | 18 | 0 | 0 | 0 | — | | — | | 18 | 0 |
| Thun | 2015–16 | Swiss Super League | 32 | 11 | 3 | 2 | 4 | 1 | — | | 39 | 14 |
| Thun | Total | | 50 | 11 | 3 | 2 | 4 | 1 | 0 | 0 | 57 | 14 |
| Grasshoppers | 2016–17 | Swiss Super League | 32 | 4 | 2 | 0 | 5 | 1 | — | | 39 | 5 |
| Grasshoppers | 2017–18 | Swiss Super League | 9 | 2 | 0 | 0 | — | | — | | 9 | 2 |
| Grasshoppers | 2018–19 | Swiss Super League | 1 | 0 | 0 | 0 | — | | — | | 1 | 0 |
| Grasshoppers | Total | | 42 | 6 | 2 | 0 | 5 | 1 | 0 | 0 | 49 | 7 |
| Erzgebirge Aue (loan) | 2017–18 | 2. Bundesliga | 16 | 3 | — | | — | | 1 (Note: Appearances in 2. Bundesliga relegation play-offs) | 0 | 17 | 3 |
| BB Erzurumspor (loan) | 2018–19 | Süper Lig | 12 | 0 | 1 | 1 | — | | — | | 13 | 1 |
| FC Thun | 2019–20 | Swiss Super League | 26 | 12 | 2 | 0 | 4 | 1 | — | | 32 | 13 |
| FC Thun | 2020–21 | Swiss Challenge League | 3 | 1 | 1 | 0 | — | | — | | 4 | 1 |
| FC Thun | Total | | 29 | 13 | 3 | 0 | 4 | 1 | 0 | 0 | 36 | 14 |
| Würzburger Kickers | 2020–21 | 2. Bundesliga | 27 | 7 | 0 | 0 | — | | 0 | 0 | 27 | 7 |
| Hansa Rostock | 2021–22 | 2. Bundesliga | 1 | 0 | 0 | 0 | — | | 0 | 0 | 1 | 0 |
| Career total | | | 218 | 44 | 10 | 3 | 20 | 3 | 1 | 0 | 249 | 50 |

== Personal life ==
Following his retirement from professional football, he joined amateur side FC Wädenswil in the 2. Liga Interregional.

He works as a pension advisor for Swiss Life.
