= Nicolai Rapp =

German footballer (born 1996)

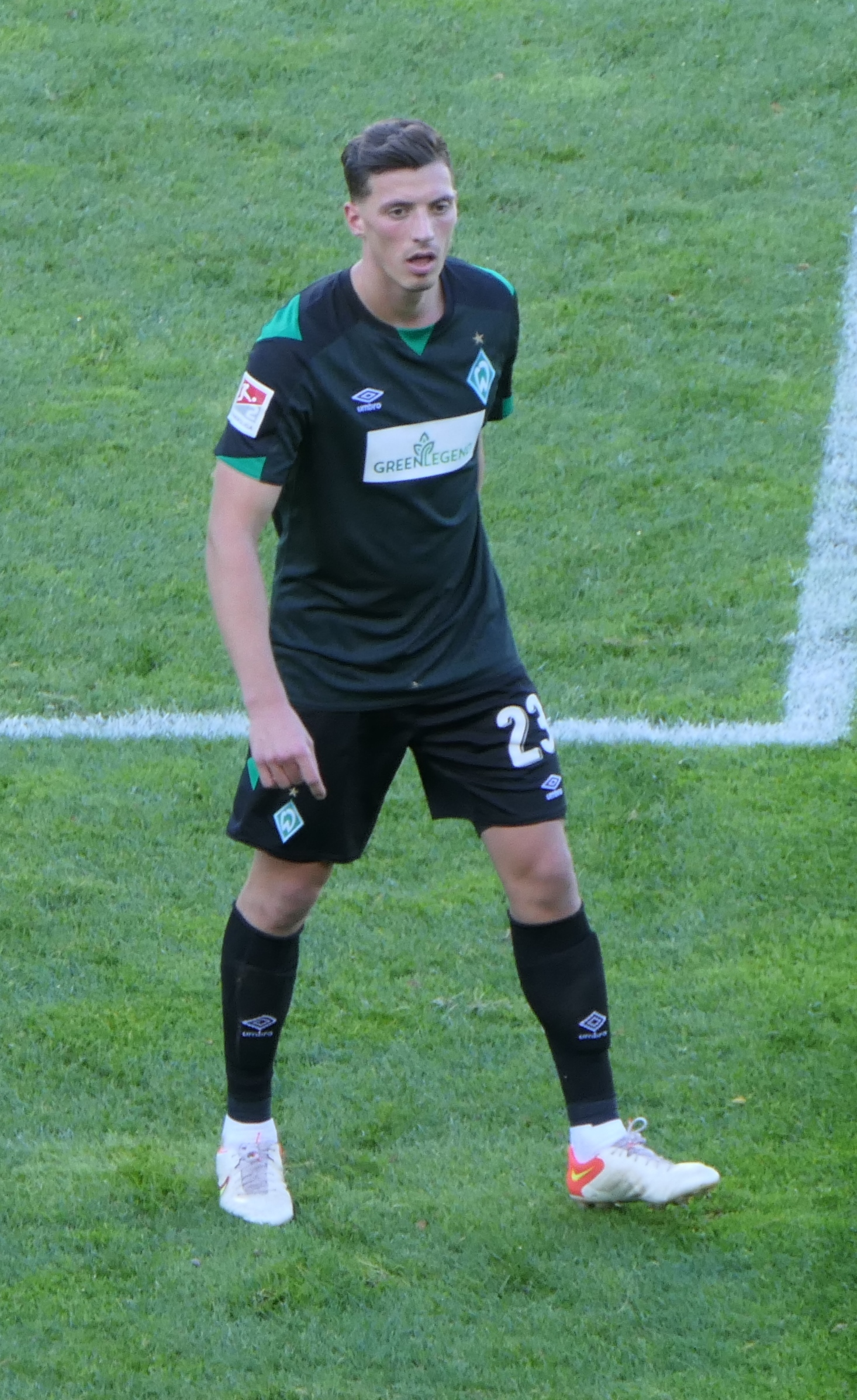
- Rapp with Werder Bremen in 2021

Personal information
- Date of birth: 13 December 1996 (age 29)
- Place of birth: Heidelberg, Germany
- Height: 1.86 m (6 ft 1 in)
- Positions: Defensive midfielder; centre-back

Team information
- Current team: Dynamo Dresden
- Number: 6

Youth career
- 2006–2015: 1899 Hoffenheim

Senior career*
Years	Team	Apps	(Gls)
2015–2017	1899 Hoffenheim II	15	(3)
2016–2017	→ Greuther Fürth II (loan)	5	(0)
2016–2017	→ Greuther Fürth (loan)	24	(1)
2017–2019	Erzgebirge Aue	36	(0)
2019–2021	Union Berlin	3	(0)
2020	→ Darmstadt 98 (loan)	13	(0)
2020–2021	→ Darmstadt 98 (loan)	29	(2)
2021–2024	Werder Bremen	37	(2)
2023	→ 1. FC Kaiserslautern (loan)	12	(0)
2024–2026	Karlsruher SC	66	(1)
2026–	Dynamo Dresden	0	(0)

International career
2011	Germany U16	2	(0)
2014	Germany U18	1	(0)
- * Club domestic league appearances and goals as of 18 May 2026

Nicolai Rapp (born 13 December 1996) is a German professional footballer who plays as a defensive midfielder or centre-back for 2. Bundesliga club Dynamo Dresden.

== Club career ==
In summer 2017, Rapp signed with 2. Bundesliga side Erzgebirge Aue.

In January 2019, Rapp joined league rivals Union Berlin having agreed a 3.5-year contract until summer 2022.

On 24 June 2021, it was announced Rapp would join Werder Bremen for the 2021–22 season. The transfer fee paid to Union Berlin was reported as about €200,000. Following Werder Bremen's return to the Bundesliga, he made seven substitute appearances in the 2022–23 season.

Having expressed his desire for more playing time, Rapp joined 1. FC Kaiserslautern on loan until the end of the 2022–23 season in January 2023.

On 23 January 2024, Rapp signed with Karlsruher SC in the 2. Bundesliga.

On 19 June 2026, Rapp moved to Dynamo Dresden in the same league.

== International career ==
Rapp is a youth international for Germany.

== Career statistics ==
As of match played 2 January 2023

Appearances and goals by club, season and competition
Club	Season	League			Cup		Continental		Other		Total	
Club	Season	Division	Apps	Goals	Apps	Goals	Apps	Goals	Apps	Goals	Apps	Goals
1899 Hoffenheim II	2014–15	Regionalliga Südwest	2	0	–		–		–		2	0
1899 Hoffenheim II	2015–16	Regionalliga Südwest	13	3	–		–		–		13	3
1899 Hoffenheim II	Total		15	3	0	0	0	0	0	0	15	3
Greuther Fürth (loan)	2015–16	2. Bundesliga	6	0	0	0	–		–		6	0
Greuther Fürth (loan)	2016–17	2. Bundesliga	19	1	3	0	–		–		22	1
Greuther Fürth (loan)	Total		25	1	3	0	0	0	0	0	28	1
Greuther Fürth II (loan)	2016–17	Regionalliga Bayern	5	0	0	0	–		–		5	0
Erzgebirge Aue	2017–18	2. Bundesliga	21	0	1	0	–		2 (Note: Appearances in the 2. Bundesliga/3. Liga play-offs)	0	24	0
Erzgebirge Aue	2018–19	2. Bundesliga	15	0	1	0	–		–		16	0
Erzgebirge Aue	Total		36	0	2	0	0	0	2	0	40	0
Union Berlin	2018–19	2. Bundesliga	3	0	0	0	–		–		3	0
Union Berlin	2019–20	Bundesliga	0	0	1	0	–		–		1	0
Union Berlin	Total		3	0	1	0	0	0	0	0	4	0
Darmstadt 98 (loan)	2019–20	2. Bundesliga	13	0	0	0	–		–		13	0
Darmstadt 98 (loan)	2020–21	2. Bundesliga	29	2	3	0	–		–		32	2
Werder Bremen	2021–22	2. Bundesliga	28	2	1	0	–		0	0	29	2
Werder Bremen	2022–23	Bundesliga	7	0	1	0	–		0	0	8	0
Werder Bremen	Total		35	2	2	0	0	0	0	0	37	2
Career total			161	8	11	0	0	0	2	0	174	8
