= 2021–22 FC Hansa Rostock season =

FC Hansa Rostock
2021–22 season
- Chairman: Robert Marien
- Manager: Jens Härtel
- Stadium: Ostseestadion
- 2. Bundesliga: 13th
- DFB-Pokal: Round of 16
- Top goalscorer: League: John Verhoek (17); All: John Verhoek (17)

The 2021–22 FC Hansa Rostock season was the 18th edition of FC Hansa Rostock's existence, the club's first season return in the 2. Bundesliga the second tier of Germany football, having finished 2nd in 2020–21 3. Liga, and promoted. following their promotion from the 3. Liga in the 2020–21 season. The club finished 13th in the 2. Bundesliga, and also competed in the DFB-Pokal, which they were eliminated from in the round of 16.

== Background and pre-season ==
Hansa Rostock finished 2nd in the 2020–21 3. Liga, level on points with third-placed FC Ingolstadt and winning automatic promotion as a result of their superior goal difference.

== Competitions ==
=== 2. Bundesliga ===
==== League table ====
Pos	Team	Pld	W	D	L	GF	GA	GD	Pts
11	Hannover 96	34	11	9	14	35	49	−14	42
12	Karlsruher SC	34	9	14	11	54	55	−1	41
13	Hansa Rostock	34	10	11	13	41	52	−11	41
14	SV Sandhausen	34	10	11	13	42	54	−12	41
15	Jahn Regensburg	34	10	10	14	50	51	−1	40

Source: DFB
Rules for classification: 1) Points; 2) Goal difference; 3) Goals scored; 4) Head-to-head points; 5) Head-to-head goal difference; 6) Head-to-head away goals scored; 7) Away goals scored; 8) Play-off.

==== Matches ====
2. Bundesliga match details
Match	Date	Time	Opponent	Venue	Result F–A	Scorers	Attendance	League position	Ref.
1	24 July 2021	13:30	Karlsruher SC	Home	1–3	Verhoek 52'	14,500	13th	
2	31 July 2021	13:30	Hannover 96	Away	3–0	Behrens 40', Verhoek 46', Omladic 90+3'	13,600	8th	
3	15 August 2021	13:30	1. FC Heidenheim	Away	1–1	Munsy 82'	5,400	9th	
4	21 August 2021	20:30	Dynamo Dresden	Home	1–3	Mamba 43'	14,500	11th	
5	29 August 2021	13:30	Werder Bremen	Away	0–3		21,050	13th	
6	12 September 2021	13:30	Darmstadt 98	Home	2–1	Verhoek 19', Fröde 86'	14,500	13th	
7	17 September 2021	18:30	1. FC Nürnberg	Away	0–1		25,000	14th	
8	25 September 2021	20:30	Schalke 04	Home	0–2		14,500	15th	
9	2 October 2021	13:30	Holstein Kiel	Away	2–0	Verhoek 32', 35'	9,240	14th	
10	17 October 2021	13:30	SV Sandhausen	Home	1–1	Verhoek 54'	21,200	13th	
11	24 October 2021	13:30	FC St. Pauli	Away	0–4		22,006	13th	
12	31 October 2021	13:30	Fortuna Düsseldorf	Home	2–1	Behrens 20', Bahn 73' pen.	21,000	12th	
13	6 November 2021	13:30	Jahn Regensburg	Away	3–2	Verhoek 43', 52', Behrens 49'	8,618	11th	
14	20 November 2021	13:30	Erzgebirge Aue	Home	1–2	Verhoek 37' pen.	21,750	11th	
15	28 November 2021	13:30	SC Paderborn 07	Away	1–1	Rhein 27'	7,084	11th	
16	4 December 2021	13:30	FC Ingolstadt 04	Home	1–1	Verhoek 49'	1,000	13th	
17	12 December 2021	13:30	Hamburger SV	Away	0–3		15,000	14th	
18	19 December 2021	13:30	Karlsruher SC	Away	2–2	Breier 7', 82'	750	14th	
19	14 January 2022	18:30	Hannover 96	Home	0–1		0	15th	
20	22 January 2022	13:30	1. FC Heidenheim	Home	0–0		0	14th	
21	6 February 2022	13:30	Dynamo Dresden	Away	4–1	Verhoek 6', 18', Fröling 10', 13'	10,000	11th	
22	11 February 2022	18:30	Werder Bremen	Home	1–2	Meißner 83'	10,000	14th	
23	20 February 2022	13:30	SV Darmstadt 98	Away	1–1	Sikan 65'	7,500	15th	
24	26 February 2022	13:30	1. FC Nürnberg	Home	0–2		10,000	16th	
25	5 March 2022	13:30	FC Schalke 04	Away	4–3	Ingelsson 25', Verhoek 40', Breier 56', Fröling 90+5'	28,790	15th	
26	11 March 2022	18:30	Holstein Kiel	Home	3–2	Breier 4', Verhoek 68', Behrens 81'	21,250	12th	
27	19 March 2022	13:30	SV Sandhausen	Away	1–0	Verhoek 49'	5,246	11th	
28	2 April 2022	20:30	FC St. Pauli	Home	1–0	Neidhart 59'	24,770	11th	
29	8 April 2022	18:30	Fortuna Düsseldorf	Away	0–3		22,346	12th	
30	17 April 2022	13:30	Jahn Regensburg	Home	1–1	Verhoek 44'	24,000	12th	
31	24 April 2022	13:30	Erzgebirge Aue	Away	2–2	Verhoek 25' pen., Behrens 52'	10,929	11th	
32	30 April 2022	13:30	SC Paderborn 07	Home	0–0		24,500	13th	
33	7 May 2022	13:30	FC Ingolstadt 04	Away	0–0		6,371	12th	
34	15 May 2022	15:30	Hamburger SV	Home	2–3	Neidhart 13', Fröde 90+1'	26,150	13th	

=== DFB-Pokal ===
DFB-Pokal match details
Round	Date	Time	Opponent	Venue	Result F–A	Scorers	Attendance	Ref.
First round	8 August 2021	18:30	1. FC Heidenheim	Home	3–2 (a.e.t.)	Mainka 57' o.g., Rizzuto 94', Munsy 120'	15,000	
Second round	27 October 2021	20:45	Jahn Regensburg	Away	3–3 (a.e.t.) (4–2 p)	Riedel 9', Mamba 56', Breier 120+1'	7,360	
Round of 16	19 January 2022	18:30	RB Leipzig	Away	0–2		1,000	
