= Patrick Sontheimer =

German footballer (born 1998)

Personal information
- Date of birth: 3 July 1998 (age 28)
- Place of birth: Marktoberdorf, Germany
- Height: 1.68 m (5 ft 6 in)
- Position: Midfielder

Team information
- Current team: 1. FC Saarbrücken
- Number: 6

Youth career
- 2003–2009: FC Ebenhofen
- 2009–2013: FC Memmingen
- 2013–2017: Greuther Fürth

Senior career*
| Years | Team | Apps | (Gls) |
| 2016–2020 | Greuther Fürth II | 19 | (1) |
| 2017–2020 | Greuther Fürth | 26 | (0) |
| 2019–2020 | → Würzburger Kickers (loan) | 48 | (4) |
| 2020–2021 | Würzburger Kickers | 31 | (2) |
| 2021–2023 | Viktoria Köln | 71 | (5) |
| 2023– | 1. FC Saarbrücken | 91 | (3) |

International career
| 2014 | Germany U17 | 2 | (0) |
| 2017 | Germany U19 | 2 | (0) |
- * Club domestic league appearances and goals as of 30 May 2026

Patrick Sontheimer (born 3 July 1998) is a German professional footballer who plays as a midfielder for 3. Liga club 1. FC Saarbrücken.

== Club career ==
Sontheimer, born and raised in Marktoberdorf, Ostallgäu, progressed through the youth departments of the clubs FC Ebenhofen and FC Memmingen, already starting at the age of 5. In 2013, Bavarian club SpVgg Greuther Fürth signed him to their youth academy. Sontheimer played with the Fürth youth teams as a regular starter in the Under 17 Bundesliga and Under 19 Bundesliga, before he made his first brief appearance in the senior division in October 2016 at the age of 18 when he played for the Greuther Fürth II team in the Regionalliga against FC Augsburg II.

In the winter training camp of the 2016–17 season, Sontheimer was temporarily allowed to practice with the first-team squad under head coach János Radoki, who knew him from the U19s. In the first match of the new year against 1860 Munich, Sontheimer was in the starting line-up and made another ten appearances during the spring. In March 2017, he signed a professional contract valid until 2020.

For the second half of the 2018–19 season, Sontheimer was sent on loan to 3. Liga club Würzburger Kickers. With the team he won the final of the Bavarian Cup against Viktoria Aschaffenburg with a 3–0 score. Following the season, the loan agreement between Fürth and Würzburg was extended by a year and an option to buy was added. At the end of February 2020, the Kickers triggered the option to buy and Sontheimer, who had become a regular starter for the team, stayed in Würzburg permanently. At the end of the 2019–20 season, in which he was used various places in midfield, Sontheimer reached promotion to the 2. Bundesliga with the Kickers. He had only missed one league game due to a yellow card suspension and was named the second best defensive midfielder in the 3. Liga for the season. In June 2021, his contract was not extended.

In July 2021, Sontheimer moved to 3. Liga club Viktoria Köln on a free transfer.

On 26 June 2023, Sontheimer moved to 1. FC Saarbrücken. On 2 November 2023, he would score the first goal in a historic upset against Bayern Munich in the DFB-Pokal Round of 32.

== International career ==
Sontheimer has gained four total caps for German national youth teams; two at under-17 level and two at under-19 level.

== Honours ==
Würzburger Kickers

- 3. Liga runners-up: 2019–20
- Bavarian Cup: 2018–19
