= Moritz Kuhn =

German footballer

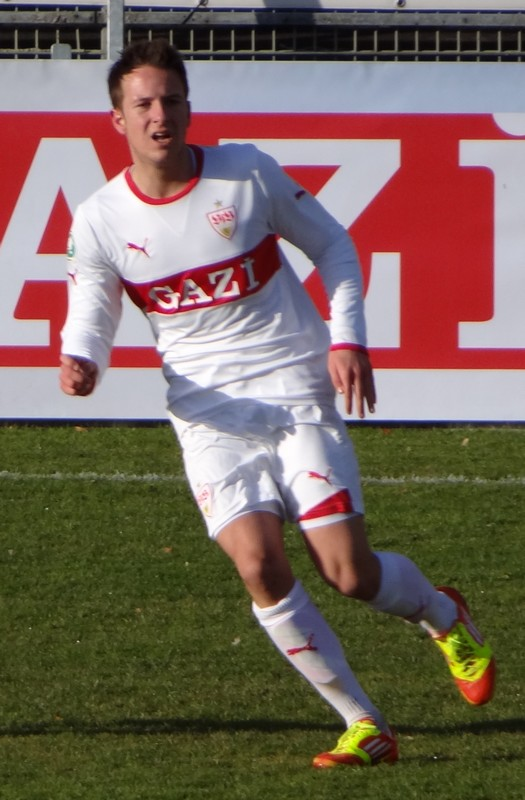

Personal information
- Date of birth: 1 August 1991 (age 35)
- Place of birth: Ruit (Fildern), Germany
- Height: 1.78 m (5 ft 10 in)
- Position: Midfielder

Team information
- Current team: SSV Reutlingen 05
- Number: 17

Youth career
- TB Ruit
- TV Nellingen
- –2006: VfL Kirchheim/Teck
- 2009–2010: VfB Stuttgart

Senior career*
Years	Team	Apps	(Gls)
2010–2012	VfB Stuttgart II	3	(0)
2012–2014	SGS Großaspach	63	(9)
2014–2017	SV Sandhausen II	20	(23)
2014–2017	SV Sandhausen	38	(1)
2017–2021	SV Wehen Wiesbaden	112	(8)
2021–2022	Türkgücü München	26	(1)
2022–2024	TSG Balingen	54	(9)
2024–	SSV Reutlingen 05	0	(0)
- * Club domestic league appearances and goals as of 18 May 2024

Moritz Kuhn (born 1 August 1991) is a German footballer who plays for SSV Reutlingen 05.
