= Benedikt Kirsch =

German footballer

Personal information
- Date of birth: 15 April 1996 (age 30)
- Place of birth: Regensburg, Germany
- Height: 1.78 m (5 ft 10 in)
- Position: Midfielder

Team information
- Current team: Nürnberg II
- Number: 10

Youth career
- 2001–2003: SG Hohenschambach
- 2003–2008: Jahn Regensburg
- 2008–2015: Greuther Fürth

Senior career*
Years	Team	Apps	(Gls)
2015–2019	Greuther Fürth II	83	(12)
2016–2019	Greuther Fürth	16	(1)
2019–2021	Türkgücü München	36	(4)
2021–2023	SpVgg Bayreuth	68	(5)
2023–	Nürnberg II	100	(4)
- * Club domestic league appearances and goals as of 27 September 2026

Benedikt Kirsch (born 15 April 1996) is a German professional footballer who plays as a midfielder for Nürnberg II in Regionalliga Bayern.

== Personal life ==
In 2021 October during the game between SpVgg Bayreuth and TSV Rain, Kirsch collapsed and was taken to hospital.

== Honours ==
SpVgg Bayreuth

- Regionalliga Bayern: 2021–22
