= Mike Könnecke =

German footballer

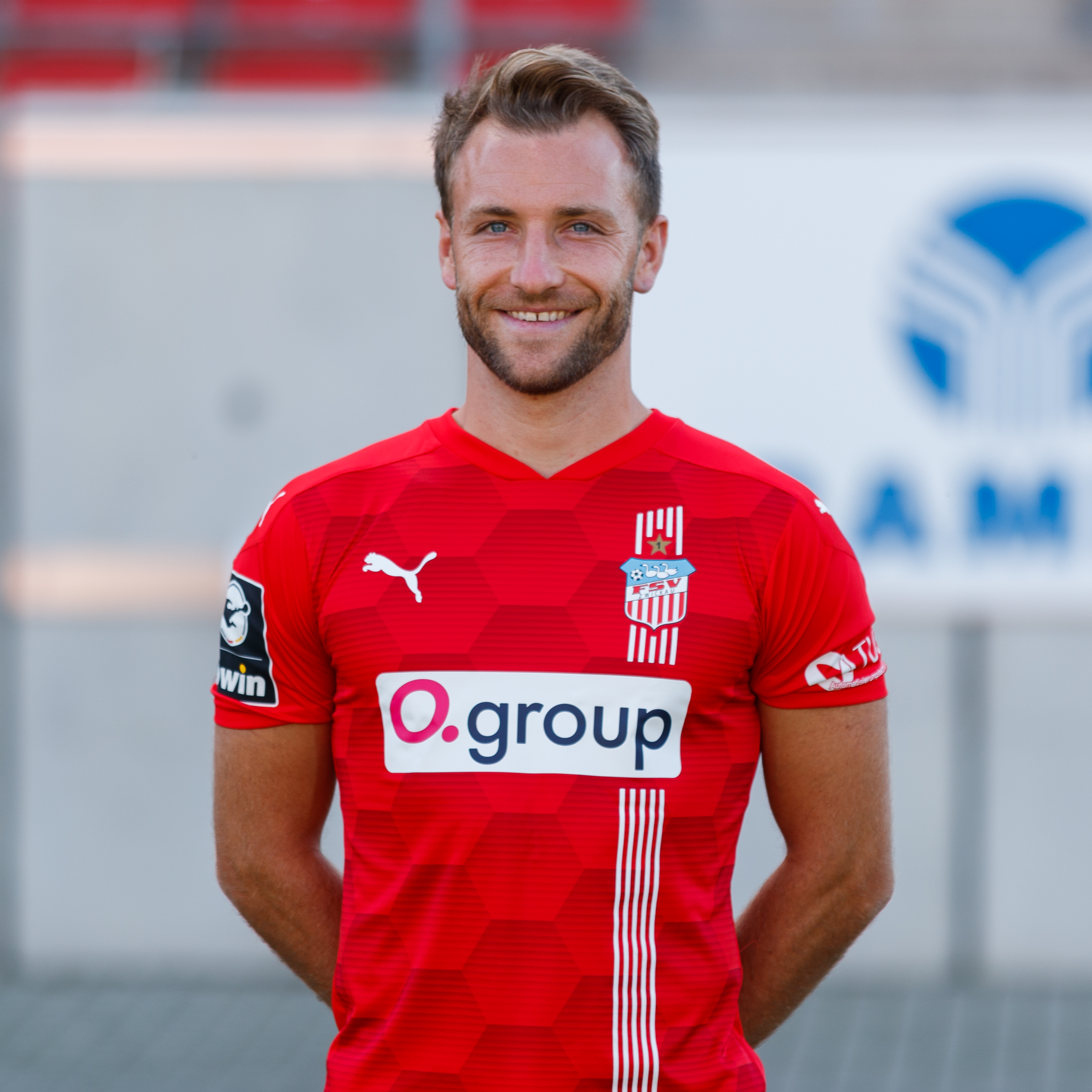

Personal information
- Full name: Mike Könnecke
- Date of birth: 23 August 1988 (age 38)
- Place of birth: Wolfsburg, West Germany
- Height: 1.74 m (5 ft 9 in)
- Position: Striker

Team information
- Current team: FSV Zwickau
- Number: 13

Youth career
- Rot-Weiß Wolfsburg
- 1. FC Wolfsburg
- VfB Fallersleben
- SSV Vorsfelde

Senior career*
Years	Team	Apps	(Gls)
2008–2011	VfL Wolfsburg II	96	(32)
2011–2016	Erzgebirge Aue	98	(3)
2016–	FSV Zwickau	240	(8)
- * Club domestic league appearances and goals as of 1 January 2025

Mike Könnecke (born 23 August 1988) is a German professional footballer who plays as a striker for FSV Zwickau.
