= Nicky Adler =

German footballer (born 1985)

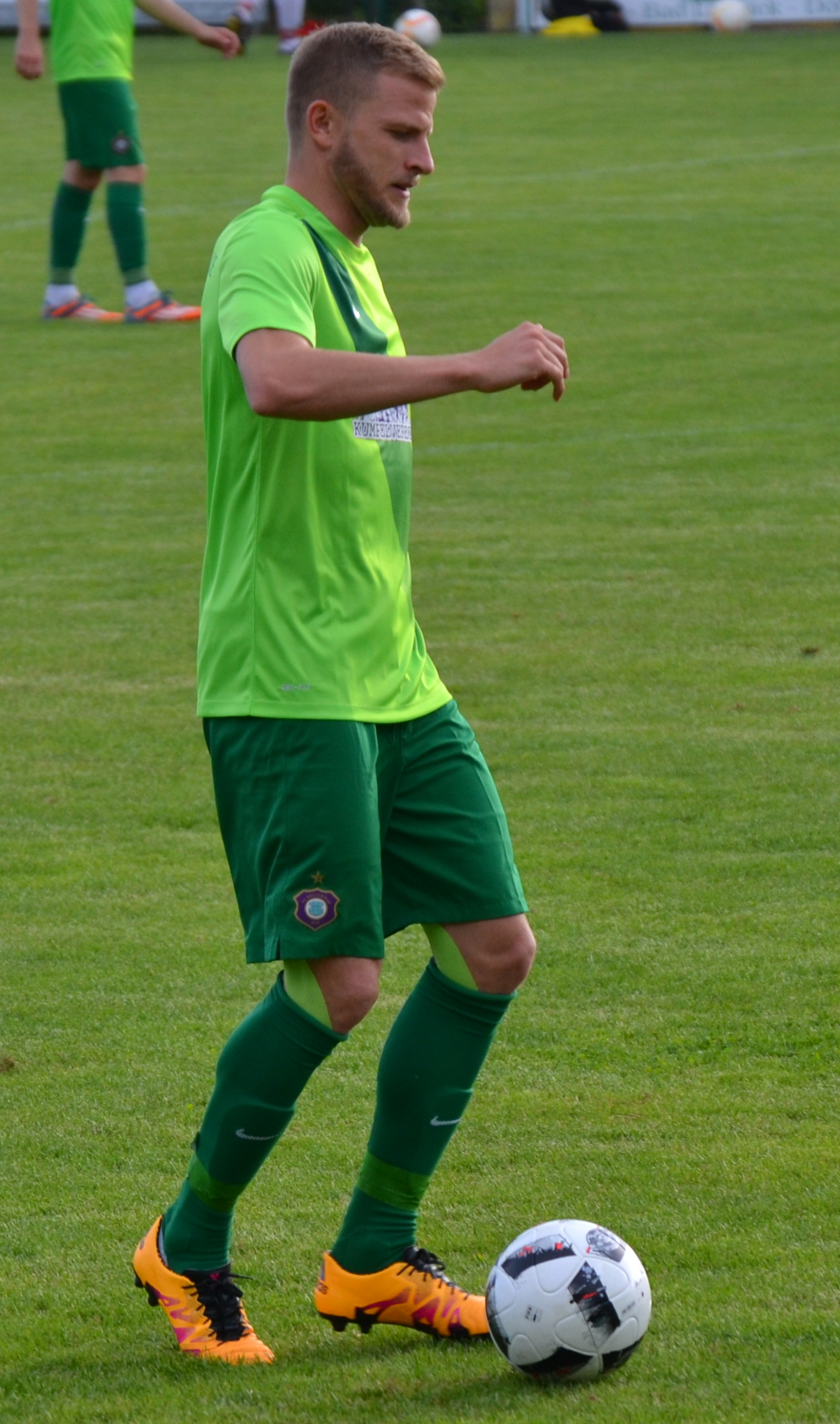
- Adler playing for Erzgebirge Aue in 2016

Personal information
- Date of birth: 23 May 1985 (age 41)
- Place of birth: Leipzig, East Germany
- Height: 1.83 m (6 ft 0 in)
- Position: Striker

Youth career
- –1997: SG Rotation Leipzig
- 1997–2003: VfB Leipzig
- 2003–2004: 1860 Munich

Senior career*
Years	Team	Apps	(Gls)
2004–2007	1860 Munich II	66	(26)
2005–2007	1860 Munich	33	(6)
2007–2008	1. FC Nürnberg	13	(0)
2007–2008	1. FC Nürnberg II	15	(7)
2008–2010	MSV Duisburg	42	(5)
2008–2010	MSV Duisburg II	8	(5)
2010–2011	VfL Osnabrück	31	(7)
2011	Wacker Burghausen	31	(8)
2012–2015	SV Sandhausen	56	(12)
2015–2018	Erzgebirge Aue	58	(10)
2018–2019	Lokomotive Leipzig	21	(2)
Total		374	(88)

International career
2004	Germany U19	2	(0)
2004–2005	Germany U20	14	(4)

Managerial career
- 2019–2020: Lokomotive Leipzig (assistant)
- * Club domestic league appearances and goals

Nicky Adler (born 23 May 1985) is a German former professional footballer, who played as a striker, and current assistant coach of Lokomotive Leipzig.

During his career, he has played for 1860 Munich, 1. FC Nürnberg, MSV Duisburg, VfL Osnabrück, Wacker Burghausen, SV Sandhausen, and Erzgebirge Aue. Adler has played internationally for Germany twice at under-19 and fourteen times at the under-20 level.

== Club career ==
In 2003, Adler moved from the amateur ranks into the professional game as a player for TSV 1860 Munich and played 68 times in lower-league football before starting out as a senior player.

Adler made his debut in the top flight of German football on 1 September 2007 at Energie Cottbus. He was brought on late in the game for Gláuber and scored three minutes from time. However, the goal was disallowed despite no visible infringement. He resigned his contract with MSV Duisburg on 7 July 2010 and signed a two-years contract for VfL Osnabrück one day later.

== International career ==
Adler played twice for the Germany U19 national team, eleven times for the Germany U20, scoring four goals.

== Coaching career ==
Retiring at the end of the 2018–19 season, Adler took his coaching license. On 8 December 2019, he was hired as an assistant coach for his last club, 1. FC Lokomotive Leipzig, under head coach Wolfgang Wolf. On 18 May 2020, the club announced that Adler would leave the club at the end of the season so he could obtain the coaching license for the next level.

== Career statistics ==
Appearances and goals by club, season and competition
Club	Season	League			Cup		Continental		Other		Total		Ref.
Club	Season	League	Apps	Goals	Apps	Goals	Apps	Goals	Apps	Goals	Apps	Goals	Ref.
1860 Munich II	2004–05	Regionalliga Süd	31	12	—		—		—		31	12	
1860 Munich II	2005–06	Regionalliga Süd	27	11	—		—		—		27	11	
1860 Munich II	2006–07	Regionalliga Süd	8	3	—		—		—		8	3	
1860 Munich II	Total		66	26	0	0	0	0	0	0	66	26	—
1860 Munich	2004–05	2. Bundesliga	0	0	0	0	—		—		0	0	
1860 Munich	2005–06	2. Bundesliga	9	0	1	0	—		—		10	0	
1860 Munich	2006–07	2. Bundesliga	24	6	1	0	—		—		25	6	
1860 Munich	Total		33	6	2	0	0	0	0	0	35	6	—
1. FC Nürnberg	2007–08	Bundesliga	13	0	1	0	3	0	—		17	0	
1. FC Nürnberg II	2007–08	Bayernliga	15	7	—		—		—		15	7	
MSV Duisburg	2008–09	2. Bundesliga	17	2	1	1	—		—		18	3	
MSV Duisburg	2009–10	2. Bundesliga	25	3	2	0	—		—		27	3	
MSV Duisburg	Total		42	5	3	1	0	0	0	0	45	6	—
MSV Duisburg II	2008–09	NRW-Liga	2	1	–		—		—		2	1	
MSV Duisburg II	2009–10	NRW-Liga	6	4	–		—		—		6	4	
MSV Duisburg II	Total		8	5	0	0	0	0	0	0	8	5	—
VfL Osnabrück	2010–11	2. Bundesliga	31	7	1	0	—		1 (Note: Appearance in relegation play-offs)	0	33	7	
Wacker Burghausen	2011–12	3. Liga	31	8	—		—		—		31	8	
SV Sandhausen	2012–13	2. Bundesliga	14	1	1	0	—		—		15	1	
SV Sandhausen	2013–14	2. Bundesliga	25	9	0	0	—		—		25	9	
SV Sandhausen	2014–15	2. Bundesliga	17	2	0	0	—		—		17	2	
SV Sandhausen	Total		56	12	1	0	0	0	0	0	57	12	—
Erzgebirge Aue	2015–16	3. Liga	33	6	2	0	—		—		35	6	
Erzgebirge Aue	2016–17	2. Bundesliga	25	4	1	0	—		—		26	4	
Erzgebirge Aue	Total		58	10	3	0	0	0	0	0	61	10	—
Lokomotive Leipzig	2018–19	Regionalliga Nordost	21	2	0	0	—		—		21	2	
Career total			374	88	11	1	3	0	1	0	388	89	—
