= Max Wegner =

German footballer (born 1989)

Personal information
- Date of birth: 24 March 1989 (age 37)
- Place of birth: Lübbecke, West Germany
- Height: 1.78 m (5 ft 10 in)
- Position: Forward

Team information
- Current team: SSV Jeddeloh II
- Number: 22

Youth career
- –2003: FC Lübbecke
- 2003–2005: SV Schnathorst
- 2005–2007: Arminia Bielefeld
- 2007–2008: Hannover 96

Senior career*
Years	Team	Apps	(Gls)
2008–2009	Hannover 96 II	4	(1)
2009–2011	SV Wilhelmshaven	48	(19)
2011–2015	Werder Bremen II	84	(27)
2013	Werder Bremen	0	(0)
2015–2017	Erzgebirge Aue	33	(4)
2017–2018	Sportfreunde Lotte	18	(1)
2018–2019	SV Meppen	10	(0)
2019	Rot-Weiss Essen	7	(2)
2019–2020	Fortuna Düsseldorf II	22	(4)
2020–2024	VfB Oldenburg	90	(20)
2024–	SSV Jeddeloh II	54	(20)
- * Club domestic league appearances and goals as of 20 June 2026

Max Wegner (born 24 March 1989) is a German professional footballer who plays as a forward for SSV Jeddeloh II.

== Career ==
In August 2020, Wegner joined Regionalliga Nord side VfB Oldenburg.
