= Dominik Meisel =

German footballer (born 1999)

Personal information
- Date of birth: 29 June 1999 (age 27)
- Place of birth: Kulmbach, Germany
- Position: Midfielder

Team information
- Current team: Würzburger Kickers
- Number: 25

Youth career
- 2004–2011: ATS Kulmbach 1861
- 2011–2014: SpVgg Bayern Hof
- 2014–2016: 1. FC Nürnberg
- 2016–2017: SpVgg Bayern Hof

Senior career*
Years	Team	Apps	(Gls)
2017–2019	Würzburger Kickers II	56	(8)
2018–	Würzburger Kickers	171	(21)
- * Club domestic league appearances and goals as of 28 June 2026

Dominik Meisel (born 29 June 1999) is a German professional footballer who plays as a midfielder for Regionalliga Bayern club Würzburger Kickers.
