= Emanuel Taffertshofer =

German footballer (born 1995)

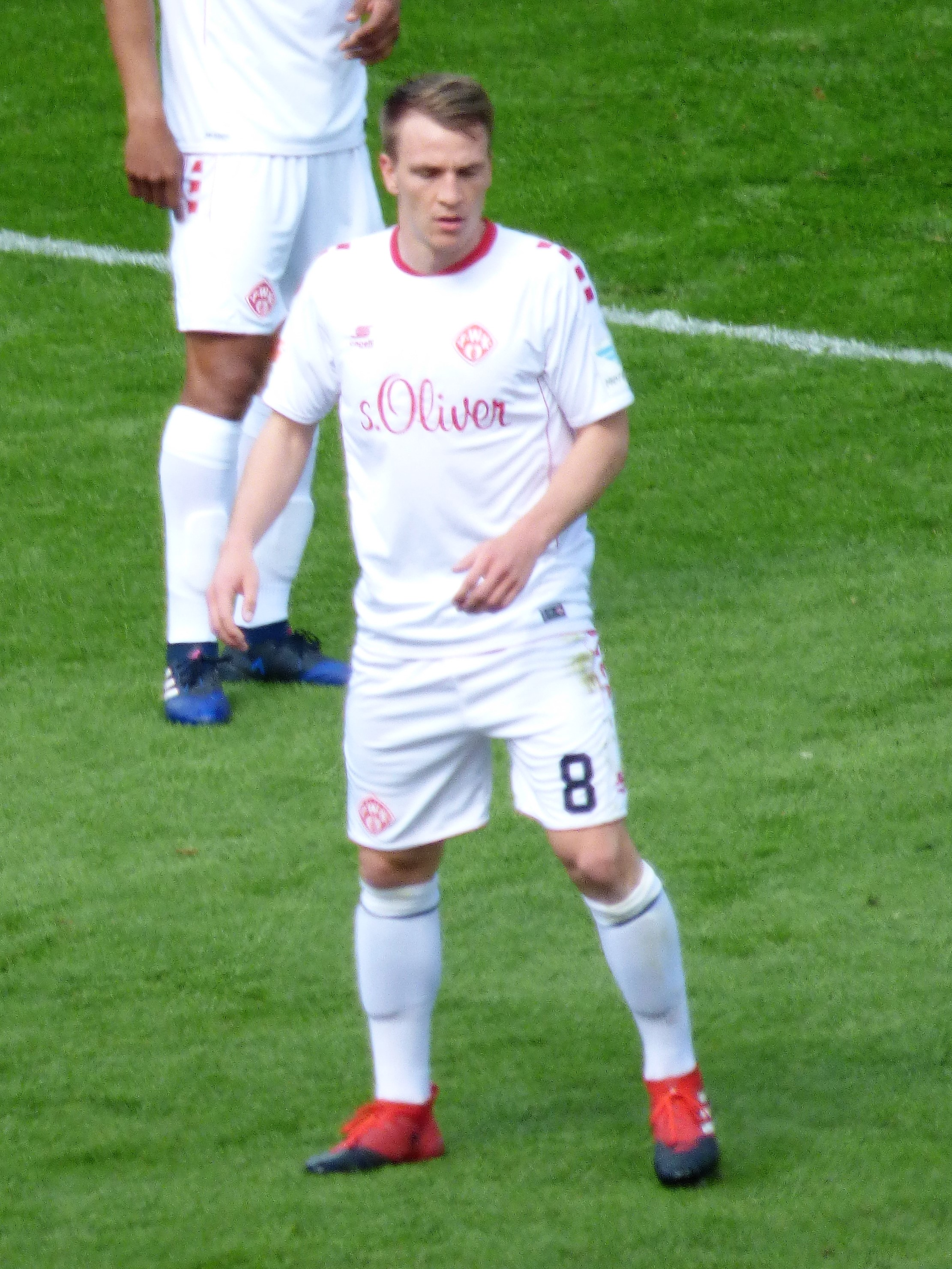
- Taffertshofer in 2017

Personal information
- Date of birth: 24 February 1995 (age 31)
- Place of birth: Landsberg am Lech, Germany
- Height: 1.74 m (5 ft 9 in)
- Position: Midfielder

Team information
- Current team: SSV Ulm
- Number: 22

Youth career
- SV Söchering
- –2013: 1860 Munich

Senior career*
Years	Team	Apps	(Gls)
2013–2016	1860 Munich II	40	(0)
2015–2016	1860 Munich	2	(0)
2016–2019	Würzburger Kickers	79	(1)
2018–2021	SV Sandhausen	49	(1)
2021–2025	SV Wehen Wiesbaden	90	(5)
2025–2026	Akritas Chlorakas	23	(0)
2025–	SSV Ulm	3	(0)
- * Club domestic league appearances and goals as of 24 September 2026

Emanuel Taffertshofer (born 24 February 1995) is a German professional footballer who plays as a midfielder for SSV Ulm.

== Career ==
Taffertshofer is a youth exponent from TSV 1860 Munich, who mainly plays for the second team in the Regionalliga Bayern. He gave his debut for the first team in a 1–0 home defeat against Karlsruhe on 19 October 2015.

== Personal life ==
Taffertshofer's older brother Ulrich is a youth exponent from 1860 Munich as well and plays currently for fellow 3. Liga side VfL Osnabrück.

== Career statistics ==
As of match played 6 June 2023

Appearances and goals by club, season and competition
Club	Season	League			DFB-Pokal		Other		Total	
Club	Season	Division	Apps	Goals	Apps	Goals	Apps	Goals	Apps	Goals
1860 Munich II	2014–15	Regionalliga Bayern	28	0	—		—		28	0
1860 Munich II	2015–16	Regionalliga Bayern	12	0	—		—		12	0
1860 Munich II	Total		40	0	—		—		40	0
1860 Munich	2015–16	2. Bundesliga	2	0	0	0	—		2	0
Würzburger Kickers	2015–16	3. Liga	14	0	—		4 (Note: Two appearances in 2. Bundesliga relegation play-offs, two appearances in Bavarian Cup)	0	18	0
Würzburger Kickers	2016–17	2. Bundesliga	25	0	1	0	—		12	0
Würzburger Kickers	2017–18	3. Liga	27	1	1	0	3 (Note: Appearances in Bavarian Cup)	0	31	1
Würzburger Kickers	Total		66	1	2	0	7	0	75	1
SV Sandhausen	2018–19	2. Bundesliga	13	0	1	0	—		14	0
SV Sandhausen	2019–20	2. Bundesliga	15	0	0	0	—		15	0
SV Sandhausen	2020–21	2. Bundesliga	21	0	1	0	—		22	0
SV Sandhausen	Total		49	0	2	0	—		51	0
SV Sandhausen II	2019–19	Oberliga BW	1	0	—		—		1	0
SV Wehen Wiesbaden	2021–22	3. Liga	27	2	1	0	1 (Note: Appearance(s) in Hessian Cup)	0	14	0
SV Wehen Wiesbaden	2022–23	3. Liga	32	1	0	0	3 (Note: Two appearances in 2. Bundesliga relegation play-offs, one appearance in Hessian Cup)	0	14	0
SV Wehen Wiesbaden	2023–24	2. Bundesliga	0	0	0	0	—		0	0
SV Wehen Wiesbaden	Total		59	3	1	0	4	0	64	3
Career total			217	4	5	0	11	0	233	4
