= Ulrich Taffertshofer =

German footballer

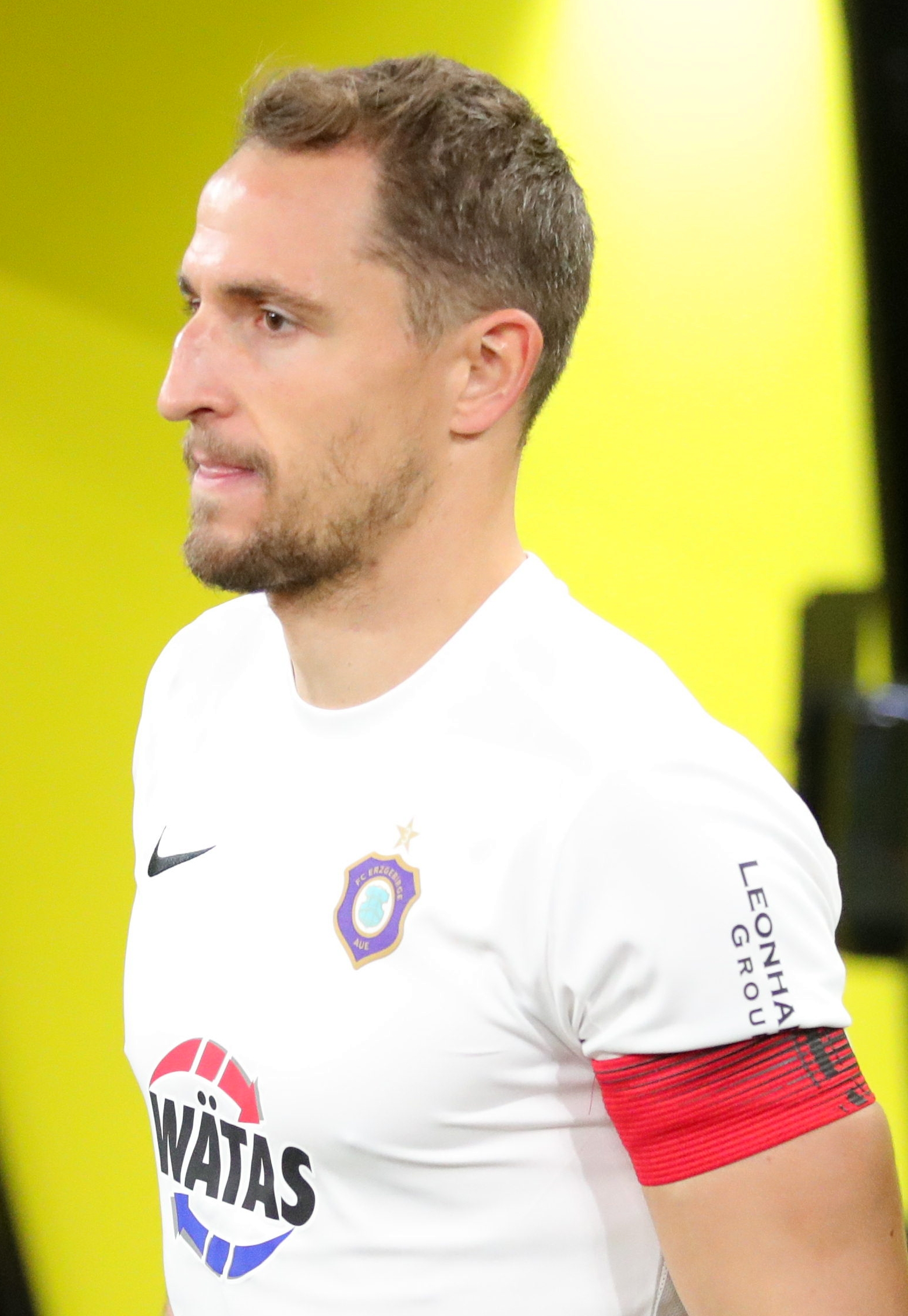
- Taffertshofer in 2022

Personal information
- Date of birth: 14 February 1992 (age 34)
- Place of birth: Penzberg, Germany
- Height: 1.84 m (6 ft 0 in)
- Positions: Defensive midfielder; centre-back

Team information
- Current team: Atlético Baleares

Youth career
- FT Starnberg
- TSV 1865 Murnau
- SV Söchering
- –2011: 1860 Munich

Senior career*
Years	Team	Apps	(Gls)
2011–2012	1860 Munich II	7	(0)
2012–2015	Wacker Burghausen	58	(2)
2015–2018	Unterhaching	94	(7)
2018–2022	VfL Osnabrück	119	(1)
2022–2023	Erzgebirge Aue	19	(0)
2023–2024	VfB Lübeck	34	(0)
2024–	Atlético Baleares	55	(1)
- * Club domestic league appearances and goals as of 7 May 2026

Ulrich Taffertshofer (born 14 February 1992) is a German professional footballer who plays as a defensive midfielder or centre-back for Segunda Federación – Group 3 club Atlético Baleares.

== Club career ==
On 13 June 2023, Taffertshofer signed a two-year contract with VfB Lübeck.

In July 2024, Taffertshofer joined Spanish Segunda Federación – Group 3 club Atlético Baleares.

== Personal life ==
Taffertshofer's younger brother Emanuel is a youth exponent from 1860 Munich as well and plays for their first team in the 2. Bundesliga.
