= 2021–22 Hannover 96 season =

Hannover 96
2021–22 season
- President: Martin Kind
- Manager: Jan Zimmermann (until 29 November); Christoph Dabrowski (from 1 December)
- Stadium: HDI-Arena
- 2. Bundesliga: 11th
- DFB-Pokal: Quarter-finals
- Top goalscorer: League: Sebastian Kerk (9); All: Sebastian Kerk (11)
- Highest home attendance: 39,500; Hannover v Schalke
- Lowest home attendance: 500; Hannover v Mönchengladbach; Hannover v Dresden
- Average home league attendance: 13,300
- Biggest win: Norderstedt 0–4 Hannover
- Biggest defeat: Darmstadt 4–0 Hannover; Karlsruhe 4–0 Hannover; Hannover 0–4 Leipzig
Home colours	Away colours	Third colours

The 2021–22 Hannover 96 season was the 126th season in the football club's history and 26th overall and third consecutive season in the second flight of German football, the 2. Bundesliga. Hannover 96 will also participate in this season's edition of the domestic cup, the DFB-Pokal. This is the 63rd season for Hannover in the HDI-Arena, located in Hanover, Lower Saxony, Germany.

== Players ==
=== Squad information ===
As of 3 February 2022

Note: Flags indicate national team as defined under FIFA eligibility rules; some limited exceptions apply. Players may hold more than one non-FIFA nationality.

No.	Pos.	Nation	Player
1	GK	DEN	Martin Hansen
3	DF	SWE	Niklas Hult
8	MF	GER	Mike Frantz
9	FW	GER	Hendrik Weydandt
10	MF	GER	Sebastian Ernst
11	MF	GER	Linton Maina
13	MF	GER	Dominik Kaiser
14	FW	GER	Maximilian Beier (on loan from 1899 Hoffenheim)
15	FW	GER	Cedric Teuchert
16	GK	GER	Ron-Robert Zieler
17	FW	AUT	Lukas Hinterseer
20	MF	GER	Philipp Ochs
21	DF	JPN	Sei Muroya
22	FW	GER	Sebastian Stolze
23	DF	SVN	Luka Krajnc

No.	Pos.	Nation	Player
24	MF	TUN	Marc Lamti
25	DF	GER	Jannik Dehm
26	MF	GER	Jan-Erik Eichhorn
27	MF	GER	Tim Walbrecht
28	DF	GER	Marcel Franke (captain)
29	MF	CMR	Gaël Ondoua
30	GK	GER	Marlon Sündermann
31	DF	GER	Julian Börner
32	MF	GER	Grace Bokake
33	FW	GUI	Moussa Doumbouya
35	MF	NED	Mark Diemers (on loan from Feyenoord)
37	MF	GER	Sebastian Kerk
38	FW	GER	Mick Gudra
40	FW	GER	Lawrence Ennali

=== Out on loan ===
Note: Flags indicate national team as defined under FIFA eligibility rules; some limited exceptions apply. Players may hold more than one non-FIFA nationality.

No.	Pos.	Nation	Player
18	FW	CMR	Franck Evina (on loan to Viktoria Berlin until 30 June 2022)
29	MF	GER	Simon Stehle (on loan to 1. FC Kaiserslautern until 30 June 2022)
30	GK	GER	Leo Weinkauf (on loan to MSV Duisburg until 30 June 2022)

=== Transfers ===
==== In ====
No.	Pos	Player	From	Type	Window	Ends	Fee	Source
6	MF	(Germany) Tom Trybull	(England) Norwich City	Transfer	Summer	30 June 2022	Free	
10	MF	(Germany) Sebastian Ernst	(Germany) Greuther Fürth	Transfer	Summer	30 June 2024	Free	
14	FW	(Germany) Maximilian Beier	(Germany) 1899 Hoffenheim	Loan	Summer	30 June 2022	Free	
16	GK	(Germany) Ron-Robert Zieler	(Germany) 1. FC Köln	Return from loan	Summer	30 June 2023	–	
17	FW	(Austria) Lukas Hinterseer	(South Korea) Ulsan Hyundai	Transfer	Summer	30 June 2023	€300,000	
22	FW	(Germany) Sebastian Stolze	(Germany) Jahn Regensburg	Transfer	Summer	30 June 2024	Free	
23	DF	(Slovenia) Luka Krajnc	(Italy) Frosinone	Transfer	Summer	30 June 2024	Free	
25	DF	(Germany) Jannik Dehm	(Germany) Holstein Kiel	Transfer	Summer	30 June 2023	Free	
27	FW	(Germany) Tim Walbrecht	(Germany) Wehen Wiesbaden	Return from loan	Summer	30 June 2023	–	
29	MF	(Cameroon) Gaël Ondoua	(Switzerland) Servette	Transfer	Summer	30 June 2023	Free	
31	DF	(Germany) Julian Börner	(England) Sheffield Wednesday	Transfer	Summer	30 June 2023	€150,000	
37	MF	(Germany) Sebastian Kerk	(Germany) VfL Osnabrück	Transfer	Summer	30 June 2023	€50,000	
15	FW	(Germany) Cedric Teuchert	(Germany) Union Berlin	Transfer	Winter	30 June 2024	Free	
35	MF	(Netherlands) Mark Diemers	(Netherlands) Feyenoord	Loan	Winter	30 June 2022	Free	

==== Out ====
No.	Pos	Player	To	Type	Window	Fee	Source
2	DF	(Croatia) Josip Elez	(Croatia) Hajduk Split	End of contract	Summer	–	
5	DF	(Guinea) Simon Falette	(Turkey) Hatayspor	Transfer	Summer	Free	
6	MF	(Slovenia) Jaka Bijol	(Russia) CSKA Moscow	End of loan	Summer	–	
10	FW	(Japan) Genki Haraguchi	(Germany) Union Berlin	End of contract	Summer	–	
15	DF	(Germany) Timo Hübers	(Germany) 1. FC Köln	End of contract	Summer	–	
17	FW	(Germany) Marvin Ducksch	(Germany) Werder Bremen	Transfer	Summer	€3.5 million	
22	GK	(Germany) Michael Ratajczak	Retirement	End of contract	Summer	–	
23	DF	(Turkey) Barış Başdaş	(Turkey) Samsunspor	Contract terminated	Summer	–	
27	MF	(Ghana) Kingsley Schindler	(Germany) 1. FC Köln	End of loan	Summer	–	
29	MF	(Germany) Simon Stehle	(Germany) 1. FC Kaiserslautern	Loan	Summer	Free	
31	GK	(Germany) Michael Esser	(Germany) VfL Bochum	Contract terminated	Summer	–	
34	MF	(Germany) Niklas Tarnat	(Germany) Rot-Weiss Essen	End of contract	Summer	–	
40	MF	(United States) McKinze Gaines	(United States) Austin FC	End of contract	Summer	–	
6	MF	(Germany) Tom Trybull	(Germany) SV Sandhausen	Contract terminated	Winter	–	
7	FW	(Ghana) Patrick Twumasi	(Israel) Maccabi Netanya	Transfer	Winter	Free	
18	FW	(Cameroon) Franck Evina	(Germany) Viktoria Berlin	Loan	Winter	Free	
19	FW	(Kosovo) Valmir Sulejmani	(Germany) FC Ingolstadt	Transfer	Winter	Free	
35	MF	(Kosovo) Florent Muslija	(Germany) SC Paderborn	Transfer	Winter	Free	

== Friendly matches ==
Win Draw Loss Cancelled

26 June 2021 Friendly	Hannover 96 (Germany)	0–2	(Germany) FC St. Pauli	Hanover
15:00 CEST (UTC+2)		Report	Becker 36'; Makienok 75'	Stadium: HDI-Arena; Attendance: 0 Referee: Eric Müller

30 June 2021 Friendly	Hannover 96 (Germany)	1–0	(Germany) Viktoria Berlin	Hanover
17:00 CEST (UTC+2)	Ennali 83'	Report		Stadium: HDI-Arena; Attendance: 0 Referee: Harm Osmers

3 July 2021 Friendly	Hannover 96 (Germany)	1–1	(Germany) SC Paderborn	Hanover
13:00 CEST (UTC+2)	Muslija 7' (pen.)	Report	Justvan 74'	Stadium: HDI-Arena; Attendance: 0 Referee: Robert Schröder

10 July 2021 Friendly	Arminia Bielefeld (Germany)	1–0	(Germany) Hannover 96	Bielefeld
15:00 CEST (UTC+2)	Serra 48'	Report		Stadium: Trainingsgelände Arminia Bielefeld; Attendance: 0

14 July 2021 Friendly	Hertha BSC (Germany)	4–4	(Germany) Hannover 96	Berlin
17:00 CEST (UTC+2)	Selke 34', 42', 45+3' (pen.); Córdoba 82' (pen.)	Report	Ducksch 39'; Stolze 56'; Muslija 59'; Sulejmani 75'	Stadium: Stadion auf dem Wurfplatz; Attendance: 850; Referee: Florian Lechner

17 July 2021 Friendly	Hannover 96 (Germany)	2–4	(Germany) 1. FC Magdeburg	Hanover
14:15 CEST (UTC+2)	Kerk 15'; Ducksch 61'	Report	Atik 14' (pen.), 44'; Schuler 41'; Małachowski 88'	Stadium: HDI-Arena; Attendance: 0 Referee: Harm Osmers

1 September 2021 Friendly	VfL Wolfsburg (Germany)	3–3	(Germany) Hannover 96	Wolfsburg
12:00 CEST (UTC+2)	Ginczek 26', 32'; L. Nmecha 85'	Report	Ernst 13'; Kerk 57', 68' (pen.)	Stadium: Platz A Referee: Robert Schröder

8 October 2021 Friendly	TSV Havelse (Germany)	0–1	(Germany) Hannover 96	Garbsen
18:30 CEST (UTC+2)		Report	Frantz 61'	Stadium: Wilhelm-Langrehr-Stadion; Attendance: 1,502

10 November 2021 Friendly	Germania Egestorf/Langreder (Germany)	2–5	(Germany) Hannover 96	Barsinghausen
18:00 CET (UTC+1)	Siegert 22'; Bode 60'	Report	Muslija 25'; Stolze 71'; Schmedemann 78'; Sulejmani 80', 85'	Stadium: August-Wenzel-Stadion; Attendance: 1,100

7 January 2022 Friendly	Hannover 96 (Germany)	Cancelled	(Netherlands) PEC Zwolle	Hanover
14:00 CET (UTC+1)				Stadium: Eilenriedestadion
Note: The match was scheduled to last for 2×60 minutes, but was cancelled due to multiple COVID-19 cases among PEC Zwolle players.

8 January 2022 Friendly	Hannover 96 (Germany)	2–2	(Germany) Werder Bremen	Hanover
12:30 CET (UTC+1)	Kerk 17'; Teuchert 34'	Report	Schmidt 25'; Ducksch 42'	Stadium: Eilenriedestadion; Attendance: 0 Referee: Franz Bokop

== Competitions ==
Win Draw Loss

=== Overview ===
Competition	First match	Last match	Starting round	Final position	Record							
Competition	First match	Last match	Starting round	Final position	Pld	W	D	L	GF	GA	GD	Win %
2. Bundesliga	24 July 2021	15 May 2022	Matchday 1	11th	34	11	9	14	35	49	−14	32.35
DFB-Pokal	7 August 2021	2 March 2022	First round	Quarter-finals	4	3	0	1	10	4	+6	75.00
Total					38	14	9	15	45	53	−8	36.84

Source: Competitions

=== 2. Bundesliga ===
==== League table ====
Pos	Team	Pld	W	D	L	GF	GA	GD	Pts
9	Holstein Kiel	34	12	9	13	46	54	−8	45
10	Fortuna Düsseldorf	34	11	11	12	45	42	+3	44
11	Hannover 96	34	11	9	14	35	49	−14	42
12	Karlsruher SC	34	9	14	11	54	55	−1	41
13	Hansa Rostock	34	10	11	13	41	52	−11	41

Source: DFB
Rules for classification: 1) Points; 2) Goal difference; 3) Goals scored; 4) Head-to-head points; 5) Head-to-head goal difference; 6) Head-to-head away goals scored; 7) Away goals scored; 8) Play-off.

==== Results summary ====
Overall								Home						Away					
Pld	W	D	L	GF	GA	GD	Pts	W	D	L	GF	GA	GD	W	D	L	GF	GA	GD
34	11	9	14	35	49	−14	42	6	6	5	16	19	−3	5	3	9	19	30	−11

Source: DFB

==== Results by round ====
Round	1	2	3	4	5	6	7	8	9	10	11	12	13	14	15	16	17	18	19	20	21	22	23	24	25	26	27	28	29	30	31	32	33	34
Ground	A	H	A	H	A	H	A	H	A	H	A	H	A	H	A	H	A	H	A	H	A	H	A	H	A	H	A	H	A	H	A	H	A	H
Result	D	L	L	W	L	W	W	L	D	L	L	D	D	D	L	W	W	L	W	D	L	D	W	W	L	L	L	D	W	D	L	W	L	W
Position	7	14	15	15	17	14	12	13	13	14	14	14	15	15	16	15	13	15	12	13	14	13	12	12	12	14	14	14	14	14	15	14	14	11

Source: DFB
A = Away; H = Home; W = Win; D = Draw; L = Loss

==== Matches ====
24 July 2021 1	Werder Bremen	1–1	Hannover 96	Bremen
20:30 CEST (UTC+2)	Falette 49' (o.g.)	Report	Ducksch 56'	Stadium: Wohninvest Weserstadion; Attendance: 14,000; Referee: Robert Kampka

31 July 2021 2	Hannover 96	0–3	Hansa Rostock	Hanover
13:30 CEST (UTC+2)		Report	Behrens 40'; Verhoek 46'; Omladič 90+3'	Stadium: HDI-Arena; Attendance: 13,600; Referee: Alexander Sather

14 August 2021 3	Dynamo Dresden	2–0	Hannover 96	Dresden
20:30 CEST (UTC+2)	Daferner 47'; Mai 82'	Report		Stadium: Rudolf-Harbig-Stadion; Attendance: 13,780; Referee: Sven Waschitzki

20 August 2021 4	Hannover 96	1–0	1. FC Heidenheim	Hanover
18:30 CEST (UTC+2)	Weydandt 88'	Report		Stadium: HDI-Arena; Attendance: 8,600; Referee: Robin Braun

28 August 2021 5	Darmstadt 98	4–0	Hannover 96	Darmstadt
13:30 CEST (UTC+2)	L. Pfeiffer 21'; Tietz 45+1'; Schnellhardt 70'; Krajnc 87' (o.g.)	Report		Stadium: Merck-Stadion am Böllenfalltor; Attendance: 6,050; Referee: Max Burda

11 September 2021 6	Hannover 96	1–0	FC St. Pauli	Hanover
13:30 CEST (UTC+2)	Kerk 39'	Report		Stadium: HDI-Arena; Attendance: 16,100; Referee: Florian Lechner

18 September 2021 7	Holstein Kiel	0–3	Hannover 96	Kiel
13:30 CEST (UTC+2)		Report	Ernst 18'; Kerk 25'; Maina 34'	Stadium: Holstein-Stadion; Attendance: 8,165; Referee: Timo Gerach

26 September 2021 8	Hannover 96	1–2	SV Sandhausen	Hanover
13:30 CEST (UTC+2)	Kaiser 82'	Report	Höhn 73'; Keita-Ruel 78'	Stadium: HDI-Arena; Attendance: 10,900; Referee: Patrick Alt

2 October 2021 9	1. FC Nürnberg	0–0	Hannover 96	Nuremberg
20:30 CEST (UTC+2)		Report		Stadium: Max-Morlock-Stadion; Attendance: 24,211; Referee: Tobias Reichel

15 October 2021 10	Hannover 96	0–1	Schalke 04	Hanover
18:30 CEST (UTC+2)		Report	Kamiński 90+5'	Stadium: HDI-Arena; Attendance: 39,500; Referee: Benjamin Cortus

24 October 2021 11	Jahn Regensburg	3–1	Hannover 96	Regensburg
13:30 CEST (UTC+2)	Singh 17'; Boukhalfa 22'; Zwarts 90+2'	Report	Kerk 54'	Stadium: Jahnstadion Regensburg; Attendance: 8,462; Referee: Sven Waschitzki

30 October 2021 12	Hannover 96	1–1	Erzgebirge Aue	Hanover
13:30 CEST (UTC+2)	Kerk 4'	Report	Nazarov 45+1'	Stadium: HDI-Arena; Attendance: 9,300; Referee: Michael Bacher

6 November 2021 13	Fortuna Düsseldorf	1–1	Hannover 96	Düsseldorf
13:30 CET (UTC+1)	Klarer 5'	Report	Muslija 90+2'	Stadium: Merkur Spiel-Arena; Attendance: 22,398; Referee: Robert Kampka

19 November 2021 14	Hannover 96	0–0	SC Paderborn	Hanover
18:30 CET (UTC+1)		Report		Stadium: HDI-Arena; Attendance: 10,400; Referee: Christian Dingert

27 November 2021 15	Karlsruher SC	4–0	Hannover 96	Karlsruhe
13:30 CET (UTC+1)	Choi 17'; Gordon 27'; Wanitzek 29'; Hofmann 83'	Report		Stadium: BBBank Wildpark; Attendance: 10,000; Referee: Robert Hartmann

5 December 2021 16	Hannover 96	1–0	Hamburger SV	Hanover
13:30 CET (UTC+1)	Maina 13'	Report		Stadium: HDI-Arena; Attendance: 22,500; Referee: Sascha Stegemann

11 December 2021 17	FC Ingolstadt	1–2	Hannover 96	Ingolstadt
13:30 CET (UTC+1)	Gaus 29'	Report	Beier 9'; Maina 38'	Stadium: Audi Sportpark; Attendance: 0 Referee: Florian Lechner

19 December 2021 18	Hannover 96	1–4	Werder Bremen	Hanover
13:30 CET (UTC+1)	Kerk 34'	Report	Schmid 22'; Ducksch 51'; Jung 72'; Friedl 84'	Stadium: HDI-Arena; Attendance: 5,000; Referee: Martin Petersen

14 January 2022 19	Hansa Rostock	0–1	Hannover 96	Rostock
18:30 CET (UTC+1)		Report	Maina 58'	Stadium: Ostseestadion; Attendance: 0 Referee: Lasse Koslowski

23 January 2022 20	Hannover 96	0–0	Dynamo Dresden	Hanover
13:30 CET (UTC+1)		Report		Stadium: HDI-Arena; Attendance: 500; Referee: Robert Kampka

4 February 2022 21	1. FC Heidenheim	3–1	Hannover 96	Heidenheim
18:30 CET (UTC+1)	Hult 4' (o.g.); Mohr 33', 48'	Report	Beier 37'	Stadium: Voith-Arena; Attendance: 4,350; Referee: Robin Braun

13 February 2022 22	Hannover 96	2–2	Darmstadt 98	Hanover
13:30 CET (UTC+1)	Teuchert 35'; Börner 50'	Report	Stolze 18' (o.g.); Seydel 61'	Stadium: HDI-Arena; Attendance: 3,800; Referee: Felix Zwayer

20 February 2022 23	FC St. Pauli	0–3	Hannover 96	Hamburg
13:30 CET (UTC+1)		Report	Kaiser 40'; Kerk 57'; Stolze 72'	Stadium: Millerntor-Stadion; Attendance: 8,470; Referee: Bastian Dankert

25 February 2022 24	Hannover 96	2–0	Holstein Kiel	Hanover
18:30 CET (UTC+1)	Kerk 66'; Hult 72'	Report		Stadium: HDI-Arena; Attendance: 9,200; Referee: Robert Hartmann

5 March 2022 25	SV Sandhausen	3–1	Hannover 96	Sandhausen
13:30 CET (UTC+1)	Okoroji 7'; Franke 19' (o.g.); Bachmann 81'	Report	Stolze 21'	Stadium: BWT-Stadion am Hardtwald; Attendance: 2,500; Referee: Sven Waschitzki-Günther

13 March 2022 26	Hannover 96	0–3	1. FC Nürnberg	Hanover
13:30 CET (UTC+1)		Report	Schleimer 26'; Krauß 83'; Shuranov 87'	Stadium: HDI-Arena; Attendance: 14,300; Referee: Robert Kampka

19 March 2022 27	Schalke 04	2–1	Hannover 96	Gelsenkirchen
13:30 CET (UTC+1)	Itakura 43'; Zalazar 54'	Report	Teuchert 50'	Stadium: Veltins-Arena; Attendance: 55,152; Referee: Sascha Stegemann

2 April 2022 28	Hannover 96	1–1	Jahn Regensburg	Hanover
13:30 CEST (UTC+2)	Stolze 39'	Report	Albers 23'	Stadium: HDI-Arena; Attendance: 9,200; Referee: Nicolas Winter

9 April 2022 29	Erzgebirge Aue	1–3	Hannover 96	Aue-Bad Schlema
13:30 CEST (UTC+2)	Trujić 54'	Report	Börner 3'; Weydandt 23'; Kerk 75'	Stadium: Erzgebirgsstadion; Attendance: 6,196; Referee: Michael Bacher

16 April 2022 30	Hannover 96	0–0	Fortuna Düsseldorf	Hanover
13:30 CEST (UTC+2)		Report		Stadium: HDI-Arena; Attendance: 17,200; Referee: Tobias Stieler

24 April 2022 31	SC Paderborn	3–0	Hannover 96	Paderborn
13:30 CEST (UTC+2)	Klement 2'; Muslija 17'; Ofori 90+1'	Report		Stadium: Benteler-Arena; Attendance: 8,400; Referee: Florian Heft

29 April 2022 32	Hannover 96	2–0	Karlsruher SC	Hanover
18:30 CEST (UTC+2)	Weydandt 25'; Beier 90+3'	Report		Stadium: HDI-Arena; Attendance: 13,700; Referee: Lasse Koslowski

7 May 2022 33	Hamburger SV	2–1	Hannover 96	Hamburg
13:30 CEST (UTC+2)	Glatzel 13', 20'	Report	Kerk 22'	Stadium: Volksparkstadion; Attendance: 57,000; Referee: Arne Aarnink

15 May 2022 34	Hannover 96	3–2	FC Ingolstadt	Hanover
15:30 CEST (UTC+2)	Heinloth 6' (o.g.); Maina 55', 73'	Report	Sulejmani 11'; Bilbija 75'	Stadium: HDI-Arena; Attendance: 22,300; Referee: Thorben Siewer

=== DFB-Pokal ===
7 August 2021 First round	Eintracht Norderstedt	0–4	Hannover 96	Norderstedt
15:30 CEST (UTC+2)		Report	Ochs 20'; Ducksch 45+1' (pen.), 63'; Muslija 65'	Stadium: Edmund-Plambeck-Stadion; Attendance: 745; Referee: Matthias Jöllenbeck

27 October 2021 Second round	Hannover 96	3–0	Fortuna Düsseldorf	Hanover
20:45 CEST (UTC+2)	Kerk 30'; Beier 90+2', 90+5'	Report		Stadium: HDI-Arena; Attendance: 11,300; Referee: Florian Badstübner

19 January 2022 Round of 16	Hannover 96	3–0	Borussia Mönchengladbach	Hanover
18:30 CET (UTC+1)	Beier 4', 51'; Kerk 36' (pen.)	Report		Stadium: HDI-Arena; Attendance: 500; Referee: Florian Badstübner

2 March 2022 Quarter-finals	Hannover 96	0–4	RB Leipzig	Hanover
18:30 CET (UTC+1)		Report	Nkunku 17', 22'; Laimer 67'; Silva 73'	Stadium: HDI-Arena; Attendance: 25,000; Referee: Marco Fritz

== Statistics ==
=== Appearances and goals ===
No.	Pos	Player	2. Bundesliga		DFB-Pokal		Total	
No.	Pos	Player	Apps	Goals	Apps	Goals	Apps	Goals
1	GK	(Denmark) Martin Hansen	9+2	0	2	0	13	0
3	DF	(Sweden) Niklas Hult	27	1	4	0	31	1
5	DF	(Guinea) Simon Falette	2	0	0	0	2	0
6	MF	(Germany) Tom Trybull	3+2	0	0+1	0	6	0
7	FW	(Ghana) Patrick Twumasi	0	0	0	0	0	0
8	MF	(Germany) Mike Frantz	4+4	0	0+1	0	9	0
9	FW	(Germany) Hendrik Weydandt	10+20	3	1+3	0	34	3
10	MF	(Germany) Sebastian Ernst	14+4	1	1+2	0	21	1
11	MF	(Germany) Linton Maina	19+8	6	3	0	30	6
13	MF	(Germany) Dominik Kaiser	19+8	2	4	0	31	2
14	FW	(Germany) Maximilian Beier	25+5	3	3	4	33	7
15	FW	(Germany) Cedric Teuchert	9+5	2	0+1	0	15	2
16	GK	(Germany) Ron-Robert Zieler	25	0	2	0	27	0
17	FW	(Germany) Marvin Ducksch	4	1	1	2	5	3
17	FW	(Austria) Lukas Hinterseer	12+4	0	0	0	16	0
18	FW	(Cameroon) Franck Evina	0	0	0	0	0	0
19	FW	(Kosovo) Valmir Sulejmani	0+4	0	0+1	0	5	0
20	MF	(Germany) Philipp Ochs	7+13	0	1+1	1	22	1
21	DF	(Japan) Sei Muroya	20+7	0	3	0	30	0
22	FW	(Germany) Sebastian Stolze	15+14	3	2+2	0	33	3
23	DF	(Slovenia) Luka Krajnc	12+8	0	1+1	0	22	0
24	DF	(Tunisia) Marc Lamti	0+1	0	0+1	0	2	0
25	DF	(Germany) Jannik Dehm	14+3	0	1+2	0	20	0
26	MF	(Germany) Jan-Erik Eichhorn	0	0	0	0	0	0
27	MF	(Germany) Tim Walbrecht	3+2	0	0+1	0	6	0
28	DF	(Germany) Marcel Franke	28	0	4	0	32	0
29	MF	(Cameroon) Gaël Ondoua	22+5	0	3	0	30	0
30	GK	(Germany) Marlon Sündermann	0	0	0	0	0	0
31	DF	(Germany) Julian Börner	26	2	3	0	29	2
32	MF	(Germany) Grace Bokake	0	0	0	0	0	0
33	FW	(Guinea) Moussa Doumbouya	0+3	0	0	0	3	0
35	MF	(Kosovo) Florent Muslija	5+8	1	1	1	14	2
35	MF	(Netherlands) Mark Diemers	12+3	0	1	0	16	0
37	MF	(Germany) Sebastian Kerk	28+3	9	3	2	34	11
38	FW	(Germany) Mick Gudra	0	0	0	0	0	0
40	FW	(Germany) Lawrence Ennali	0+8	0	0+2	0	10	0

=== Goalscorers ===
Rank	No.	Pos	Name	2. Bundesliga	DFB-Pokal	Total
1	37	MF	(Germany) Sebastian Kerk	9	2	11
2	14	FW	(Germany) Maximilian Beier	3	4	7
3	11	MF	(Germany) Linton Maina	6	0	6
4	9	FW	(Germany) Hendrik Weydandt	3	0	3
4	17	FW	(Germany) Marvin Ducksch	1	2	3
4	22	FW	(Germany) Sebastian Stolze	3	0	3
7	13	MF	(Germany) Dominik Kaiser	2	0	2
7	15	FW	(Germany) Cedric Teuchert	2	0	2
7	31	DF	(Germany) Julian Börner	2	0	2
7	35	MF	(Kosovo) Florent Muslija	1	1	2
11	3	DF	(Sweden) Niklas Hult	1	0	1
11	10	MF	(Germany) Sebastian Ernst	1	0	1
11	20	MF	(Germany) Philipp Ochs	0	1	1
Own goal				1	0	1
Total				35	10	45

=== Clean sheets ===
Rank	No.	Pos	Name	2. Bundesliga	DFB-Pokal	Total
1	16	GK	(Germany) Ron-Robert Zieler	10	1	11
2	1	GK	(Denmark) Martin Hansen	2	2	4
Total				12	3	15

=== Disciplinary record ===
Rank	No.	Pos	Name	2. Bundesliga			DFB-Pokal			Total		
Rank	No.	Pos	Name	Booked	(yellow card) (yellow-red card)	Sent off (straight red)	Booked	(yellow card) (yellow-red card)	Sent off (straight red)	Booked	(yellow card) (yellow-red card)	Sent off (straight red)
1	31	DF	(Germany) Julian Börner	8	0	1	0	0	0	8	0	1
2	3	DF	(Sweden) Niklas Hult	3	0	1	1	0	0	4	0	1
3	29	MF	(Cameroon) Gaël Ondoua	7	0	0	0	0	0	7	0	0
4	10	MF	(Germany) Sebastian Ernst	5	0	0	0	0	0	5	0	0
5	13	MF	(Germany) Dominik Kaiser	4	0	0	0	0	0	4	0	0
5	14	FW	(Germany) Maximilian Beier	4	0	0	0	0	0	4	0	0
5	25	DF	(Germany) Jannik Dehm	4	0	0	0	0	0	4	0	0
8	21	DF	(Japan) Sei Muroya	3	0	0	0	0	0	3	0	0
8	22	FW	(Germany) Sebastian Stolze	3	0	0	0	0	0	3	0	0
10	6	MF	(Germany) Tom Trybull	2	0	0	0	0	0	2	0	0
10	9	FW	(Germany) Hendrik Weydandt	2	0	0	0	0	0	2	0	0
10	11	MF	(Germany) Linton Maina	2	0	0	0	0	0	2	0	0
10	15	FW	(Germany) Cedric Teuchert	2	0	0	0	0	0	2	0	0
10	17	FW	(Germany) Marvin Ducksch	2	0	0	0	0	0	2	0	0
10	20	DF	(Germany) Philipp Ochs	1	0	0	1	0	0	2	0	0
10	28	DF	(Germany) Marcel Franke	2	0	0	0	0	0	2	0	0
10	35	MF	(Netherlands) Mark Diemers	2	0	0	0	0	0	2	0	0
10	37	MF	(Germany) Sebastian Kerk	2	0	0	0	0	0	2	0	0
19	1	GK	(Denmark) Martin Hansen	1	0	0	0	0	0	1	0	0
19	16	GK	(Germany) Ron-Robert Zieler	1	0	0	0	0	0	1	0	0
19	23	DF	(Slovenia) Luka Krajnc	1	0	0	0	0	0	1	0	0
Total				61	0	2	2	0	0	63	0	2
