= 2020–21 Hannover 96 season =

Hannover 96
2020–21 season
- President: Martin Kind
- Manager: Kenan Kocak
- Stadium: HDI-Arena
- 2. Bundesliga: 13th
- DFB-Pokal: Second round
- Top goalscorer: League: Marvin Ducksch (16); All: Marvin Ducksch (16)
- Highest home attendance: 8,900
- Lowest home attendance: 0
- Average home league attendance: 982
- Biggest win: Hannover 4–0 Sandhausen
- Biggest defeat: Fürth 4–1 Hannover; Hannover 0–3 Kiel; Hannover 0–3 Bremen
Home colours	Away colours	Third colours

The 2020–21 Hannover 96 season was the 125th season in the football club's history and 25th overall and second consecutive season in the second flight of German football, the 2. Bundesliga. Hannover 96 also participated in this season's edition of the domestic cup, the DFB-Pokal. This was the 62nd season for Hannover in the HDI-Arena, located in Hanover, Lower Saxony, Germany.

== Players ==
=== Squad information ===
As of 21 February 2021

Note: Flags indicate national team as defined under FIFA eligibility rules; some limited exceptions apply. Players may hold more than one non-FIFA nationality.

No.	Pos.	Nation	Player
1	GK	DEN	Martin Hansen
2	DF	CRO	Josip Elez
3	DF	SWE	Niklas Hult
5	DF	GUI	Simon Falette
6	MF	SVN	Jaka Bijol (on loan from CSKA Moscow)
7	FW	GHA	Patrick Twumasi
8	MF	GER	Mike Frantz (vice-captain)
9	FW	GER	Hendrik Weydandt
10	FW	JPN	Genki Haraguchi
11	MF	GER	Linton Maina
13	MF	GER	Dominik Kaiser (captain)
15	DF	GER	Timo Hübers
17	FW	GER	Marvin Ducksch
18	FW	CMR	Franck Evina
19	FW	KOS	Valmir Sulejmani

No.	Pos.	Nation	Player
20	MF	GER	Philipp Ochs
21	DF	JPN	Sei Muroya
22	GK	GER	Michael Ratajczak
23	DF	TUR	Barış Başdaş
24	MF	TUN	Marc Lamti
27	MF	GHA	Kingsley Schindler (on loan from 1. FC Köln)
28	DF	GER	Marcel Franke
29	MF	GER	Simon Stehle
30	GK	GER	Marlon Sündermann
31	GK	GER	Michael Esser
33	FW	GUI	Moussa Doumbouya
34	MF	GER	Niklas Tarnat
35	MF	KOS	Florent Muslija
38	FW	GER	Mick Gudra
40	MF	USA	McKinze Gaines

=== Out on loan ===
Note: Flags indicate national team as defined under FIFA eligibility rules; some limited exceptions apply. Players may hold more than one non-FIFA nationality.

No.	Pos.	Nation	Player
1	GK	GER	Ron-Robert Zieler (on loan to 1. FC Köln until 30 June 2021)
30	GK	GER	Leo Weinkauf (on loan to MSV Duisburg until 30 June 2021)
33	MF	GER	Tim Walbrecht (on loan to Wehen Wiesbaden until 30 June 2021)

=== Transfers ===
==== In ====
No.	Pos	Player	From	Type	Window	Ends	Fee	Source
3	DF	(Sweden) Niklas Hult	(Greece) AEK Athens	Transfer	Summer	30 June 2022	Free	
5	DF	(Guinea) Simon Falette	(Germany) Eintracht Frankfurt	Transfer	Summer	30 June 2023	Free	
6	MF	(Slovenia) Jaka Bijol	(Russia) CSKA Moscow	Loan	Summer	30 June 2021	Free	
7	MF	(Ghana) Patrick Twumasi	(Spain) Alavés	Transfer	Summer	30 June 2023	€700,000	
8	MF	(Germany) Mike Frantz	(Germany) SC Freiburg	Transfer	Summer	30 June 2022	Free	
18	FW	(Cameroon) Franck Evina	(Germany) Bayern Munich	Transfer	Summer	30 June 2023	Free	
19	FW	(Sweden) Emil Hansson	(Netherlands) RKC Waalwijk	Return from loan	Summer	30 June 2022	–	
19	FW	(Kosovo) Valmir Sulejmani	(Germany) Waldhof Mannheim	Transfer	Summer	30 June 2022	Free	
21	DF	(Japan) Sei Muroya	(Japan) FC Tokyo	Transfer	Summer	30 June 2023	€50,000	
23	DF	(Turkey) Barış Başdaş	(Turkey) Fatih Karagümrük	Transfer	Summer	30 June 2022	Free	
27	MF	(Ghana) Kingsley Schindler	(Germany) 1. FC Köln	Loan	Summer	30 June 2021	Free	
31	GK	(Germany) Michael Esser	(Germany) 1899 Hoffenheim	Transfer	Summer	30 June 2023	Free	

==== Out ====
No.	Pos	Player	To	Type	Window	Fee	Source
1	GK	(Germany) Ron-Robert Zieler	(Germany) 1. FC Köln	Loan	Summer	Free	
3	DF	(Chile) Miiko Albornoz	Free agent	End of contract	Summer	–	
4	DF	(Germany) Julian Korb	Free agent	End of contract	Summer	–	
5	DF	(Brazil) Felipe	(Turkey) Boluspor	Contract terminated	Summer	–	
6	MF	(Germany) Marvin Bakalorz	(Turkey) Denizlispor	Contract terminated	Summer	–	
7	MF	(Germany) Edgar Prib	(Germany) Fortuna Düsseldorf	Contract terminated	Summer	–	
9	FW	(Sweden) John Guidetti	(Spain) Alavés	End of loan	Summer	–	
16	FW	(United States) Sebastian Soto	(England) Norwich City	End of contract	Summer	–	
18	MF	(Germany) Marc Stendera	(Germany) FC Ingolstadt	End of contract	Summer	–	
19	FW	(Sweden) Emil Hansson	(Netherlands) Fortuna Sittard	Transfer	Summer	€400,000	
21	DF	(Germany) Jannes Horn	(Germany) 1. FC Köln	End of loan	Summer	–	
22	DF	(Germany) Matthias Ostrzolek	Free agent	End of contract	Summer	–	
24	DF	(Germany) Sebastian Jung	(Germany) Karlsruher SC	End of contract	Summer	–	
31	DF	(Germany) Waldemar Anton	(Germany) VfB Stuttgart	Transfer	Summer	€4 million	
33	FW	(Germany) Cedric Teuchert	(Germany) Schalke 04	End of loan	Summer	–	
33	MF	(Germany) Tim Walbrecht	(Germany) Wehen Wiesbaden	Loan	Summer	Free	
40	FW	(Germany) Marco Stefandl	(Germany) Atlas Delmenhorst	End of contract	Summer	–	

== Friendly matches ==
Win Draw Loss Void

8 August 2020 Friendly	Hannover 96 (Germany)	5–2	(Germany) Hannoverscher SC	Hanover
12:00 CEST (UTC+2)	Frantz 17'; Elez 30'; Haraguchi 38', 62'; Evina 49'	Report	Ngongang 75'; Wiederhold 85'	Stadium: HDI-Arena; Attendance: 0 Referee: Robert Schröder

15 August 2020 Friendly	Hannover 96 (Germany)	3–1	(Netherlands) Roda JC Kerkrade	Hanover
12:00 CEST (UTC+2)	Weydandt 56' (pen.), 58'; Evina 71'	Report	Remans 73'	Stadium: Eilenriedestadion; Attendance: 0 Referee: Robert Schröder

21 August 2020 Friendly	Hannover 96 (Germany)	4–3	(Germany) KFC Uerdingen	Hanover
13:00 CEST (UTC+2)	Frantz 22'; Evina 28'; Ochs 42'; Ducksch 67'	Report	Ibrahimaj 3'; Kobiljar 59'; Pusch 64'	Stadium: HDI-Arena; Attendance: 0 Referee: Harm Osmers
Note: The match lasted for 3×30 and 1×25 minutes.

26 August 2020 Friendly	Hartberg (Austria)	2–1	(Germany) Hannover 96	Bad Waltersdorf, Austria
17:30 CEST (UTC+2)	Tadić 52'; Nimaga 66'	Report	Stehle 33'	Stadium: Thermenstadion

5 September 2020 Friendly	Werder Bremen (Germany)	2–0	(Germany) Hannover 96	Bremen
15:30 CEST (UTC+2)	Füllkrug 39'; Sargent 73'	Report		Stadium: Weserstadion Platz 11; Attendance: 0

8 October 2020 Friendly	Union Berlin (Germany)	4–1	(Germany) Hannover 96	Berlin
17:20 CEST (UTC+2)	Gogia 27' (pen.); Bülter 69'; Teuchert 72', 75'	Report	Sulejmani 49'	Stadium: Stadion An der Alten Försterei; Attendance: 1,759
Note: The match was originally scheduled for 17:00 CEST, but was delayed to 17:20 CEST due to Hannover being stuck in traffic on the way to the stadium.

14 November 2020 Friendly	Hannover 96 (Germany)	0–0	(Germany) VfL Wolfsburg	Hanover
12:00 CET (UTC+1)		Report		Stadium: Eilenriedestadion; Attendance: 0 Referee: Harm Osmers

25 March 2021 Friendly	Hannover 96 (Germany)	Cancelled	(Germany) Arminia Bielefeld	Hanover
14:00 CET (UTC+1)				Stadium: Eilenriedestadion
Note: The match was cancelled after Arminia Bielefeld decided to play a friendly match against FC St. Pauli instead since Hannover 96 was scheduled to be quarantined due to positive COVID-19 tests.

== Competitions ==
Win Draw Loss

=== Overview ===
Competition	First match	Last match	Starting round	Final position	Record							
Competition	First match	Last match	Starting round	Final position	Pld	W	D	L	GF	GA	GD	Win %
2. Bundesliga	19 September 2020	23 May 2021	Matchday 1	13th	34	12	6	16	53	51	+2	35.29
DFB-Pokal	14 September 2020	23 December 2020	First round	Second round	2	1	0	1	3	5	−2	50.00
Total					36	13	6	17	56	56	+0	36.11

Source: Competitions

=== 2. Bundesliga ===
==== League table ====
Pos	Team	Pld	W	D	L	GF	GA	GD	Pts
11	1. FC Nürnberg	34	11	11	12	46	51	−5	44
12	Erzgebirge Aue	34	12	8	14	44	53	−9	44
13	Hannover 96	34	12	6	16	53	51	+2	42
14	Jahn Regensburg	34	9	11	14	37	50	−13	38
15	SV Sandhausen	34	10	4	20	41	60	−19	34

Source: DFB
Rules for classification: 1) Points; 2) Goal difference; 3) Goals scored; 4) Head-to-head points; 5) Head-to-head goal difference; 6) Head-to-head away goals scored; 7) Away goals scored; 8) Play-off.

==== Results summary ====
Overall								Home						Away					
Pld	W	D	L	GF	GA	GD	Pts	W	D	L	GF	GA	GD	W	D	L	GF	GA	GD
34	12	6	16	53	51	+2	42	7	4	6	30	22	+8	5	2	10	23	29	−6

Source: DFB

==== Results by round ====
Round	1	2	3	4	5	6	7	8	9	10	11	12	13	14	15	16	17	18	19	20	21	22	23	24	25	26	27	28	29	30	31	32	33	34
Ground	H	A	H	A	H	A	H	A	H	A	A	H	A	H	A	H	A	A	H	A	H	A	H	A	H	A	H	H	A	H	A	H	A	H
Result	W	L	W	L	W	L	D	L	L	W	L	W	D	W	W	L	W	L	W	W	D	L	D	D	L	L	D	L	L	W	L	L	W	L
Position	2	8	3	4	3	6	7	11	14	13	13	11	12	9	6	8	6	8	7	6	6	7	8	8	8	9	10	11	11	10	13	13	11	13

Source: DFB
A = Away; H = Home; W = Win; D = Draw; L = Loss

==== Matches ====
19 September 2020 1	Hannover 96	2–0	Karlsruher SC	Hanover
13:00 CEST (UTC+2)	Kaiser 25'; Maina 85'	Report		Stadium: HDI-Arena; Attendance: 500; Referee: Tobias Stieler

25 September 2020 2	VfL Osnabrück	2–1	Hannover 96	Osnabrück
18:30 CEST (UTC+2)	Santos 33' (pen.), 47'	Report	Ducksch 90+2'	Stadium: Stadion an der Bremer Brücke; Attendance: 3,200; Referee: Arne Aarnink

3 October 2020 3	Hannover 96	4–1	Eintracht Braunschweig	Hanover
13:00 CEST (UTC+2)	Maina 54'; Weydandt 71'; Hult 74'; Haraguchi 86'	Report	Kobylański 51'	Stadium: HDI-Arena; Attendance: 7,300; Referee: Daniel Siebert

18 October 2020 4	SC Paderborn	1–0	Hannover 96	Paderborn
13:30 CEST (UTC+2)	Dörfler 26'	Report		Stadium: Benteler-Arena; Attendance: 2,258; Referee: Manuel Gräfe

24 October 2020 5	Hannover 96	3–0	Fortuna Düsseldorf	Hanover
13:00 CEST (UTC+2)	Muslija 57'; Ducksch 63' (pen.); Kastenmeier 85' (o.g.)	Report		Stadium: HDI-Arena; Attendance: 8,900; Referee: Bastian Dankert

1 November 2020 6	Greuther Fürth	4–1	Hannover 96	Fürth
13:30 CET (UTC+1)	Green 22'; Seguin 27'; Hrgota 52', 68'	Report	Weydandt 58'	Stadium: Sportpark Ronhof Thomas Sommer; Attendance: 0 Referee: Christof Günsch

7 November 2020 7	Hannover 96	0–0	Erzgebirge Aue	Hanover
13:00 CET (UTC+1)		Report		Stadium: HDI-Arena; Attendance: 0 Referee: Michael Bacher

22 November 2020 8	Würzburger Kickers	2–1	Hannover 96	Würzburg
13:30 CET (UTC+1)	Munsy 53'; Kopacz 74'	Report	Ducksch 17'	Stadium: flyeralarm Arena; Attendance: 0 Referee: Nicolas Winter

29 November 2020 9	Hannover 96	0–3	Holstein Kiel	Hanover
13:30 CET (UTC+1)		Report	Mühling 56' (pen.); Kaiser 57' (o.g.); Serra 60'	Stadium: HDI-Arena; Attendance: 0 Referee: Markus Schmidt

5 December 2020 10	Hamburger SV	0–1	Hannover 96	Hamburg
13:00 CET (UTC+1)		Report	Weydandt 13'	Stadium: Volksparkstadion; Attendance: 0 Referee: Bastian Dankert

12 December 2020 11	1. FC Heidenheim	1–0	Hannover 96	Heidenheim
13:00 CET (UTC+1)	Kühlwetter 20'	Report		Stadium: Voith-Arena; Attendance: 0 Referee: Sven Waschitzki

15 December 2020 12	Hannover 96	2–0	VfL Bochum	Hanover
18:30 CET (UTC+1)	Sulejmani 2'; Ducksch 60' (pen.)	Report		Stadium: HDI-Arena; Attendance: 0 Referee: Felix Zwayer

18 December 2020 13	Jahn Regensburg	0–0	Hannover 96	Regensburg
18:30 CET (UTC+1)		Report		Stadium: Jahnstadion Regensburg; Attendance: 0 Referee: Patrick Hanslbauer

3 January 2021 14	Hannover 96	4–0	SV Sandhausen	Hanover
13:30 CET (UTC+1)	Ducksch 23', 52'; Twumasi 48', 89'	Report		Stadium: HDI-Arena; Attendance: 0 Referee: Robert Kampka

10 January 2021 15	Darmstadt 98	1–2	Hannover 96	Darmstadt
13:30 CET (UTC+1)	Seydel 68'	Report	Ducksch 45', 50'	Stadium: Merck-Stadion am Böllenfalltor; Attendance: 0 Referee: Patrick Alt

16 January 2021 16	Hannover 96	2–3	FC St. Pauli	Hanover
13:00 CET (UTC+1)	Haraguchi 53', 55'	Report	Zalazar 2'; Burgstaller 10'; Matanović 90+2'	Stadium: HDI-Arena; Attendance: 0 Referee: Sören Storks

24 January 2021 17	1. FC Nürnberg	2–5	Hannover 96	Nuremberg
13:30 CET (UTC+1)	Schäffler 35'; Geis 89'	Report	Ducksch 20' (pen.); Hübers 24'; Haraguchi 58'; Muslija 72'; Twumasi 86'	Stadium: Max-Morlock-Stadion; Attendance: 0 Referee: Florian Lechner

27 January 2021 18	Karlsruher SC	1–0	Hannover 96	Karlsruhe
20:30 CET (UTC+1)	Schindler 65' (o.g.)	Report		Stadium: Wildparkstadion; Attendance: 0 Referee: Martin Petersen

1 February 2021 19	Hannover 96	1–0	VfL Osnabrück	Hanover
20:30 CET (UTC+1)	Hübers 55'	Report		Stadium: HDI-Arena; Attendance: 0 Referee: Manuel Gräfe

6 February 2021 20	Eintracht Braunschweig	1–2	Hannover 96	Braunschweig
13:00 CET (UTC+1)	Ji 17'	Report	Sulejmani 34'; Ducksch 36'	Stadium: Eintracht-Stadion; Attendance: 0 Referee: Benjamin Cortus

12 February 2021 21	Hannover 96	0–0	SC Paderborn	Hanover
18:30 CET (UTC+1)		Report		Stadium: HDI-Arena; Attendance: 0 Referee: Tobias Reichel

21 February 2021 22	Fortuna Düsseldorf	3–2	Hannover 96	Düsseldorf
13:30 CET (UTC+1)	Hennings 28' (pen.); Klaus 52'; Appelkamp 76'	Report	Muslija 37'; Gudra 79'	Stadium: Merkur Spiel-Arena; Attendance: 0 Referee: Felix Zwayer

27 February 2021 23	Hannover 96	2–2	Greuther Fürth	Hanover
13:00 CET (UTC+1)	Haraguchi 41'; Doumbouya 70'	Report	Nielsen 68'; Abiama 76'	Stadium: HDI-Arena; Attendance: 0 Referee: Christof Günsch

6 March 2021 24	Erzgebirge Aue	1–1	Hannover 96	Aue-Bad Schlema
13:00 CET (UTC+1)	Testroet 64'	Report	Ochs 24'	Stadium: Erzgebirgsstadion; Attendance: 0 Referee: Arne Aarnink

4 April 2021 27	Hannover 96	3–3	Hamburger SV	Hanover
13:30 CEST (UTC+2)	Haraguchi 56', 84'; Ducksch 68'	Report	Hunt 14', 34', 50'	Stadium: HDI-Arena; Attendance: 0 Referee: Florian Badstübner

8 April 2021 25	Hannover 96	1–2	Würzburger Kickers	Hanover
18:30 CEST (UTC+2)	Haraguchi 47'	Report	Ronstadt 58'; van La Parra 80'	Stadium: HDI-Arena; Attendance: 0 Referee: Nicolas Winter
Note: The match was originally scheduled for 14 March 2021, 13:30 CET, but was postponed because Hannover 96 was quarantined after a player tested positive for COVID-19.

11 April 2021 28	Hannover 96	1–3	1. FC Heidenheim	Hanover
13:30 CEST (UTC+2)	Muslija 51'	Report	Busch 43'; Leipertz 75'; Schimmer 79'	Stadium: HDI-Arena; Attendance: 0 Referee: Lasse Koslowski

18 April 2021 29	VfL Bochum	4–3	Hannover 96	Bochum
13:30 CEST (UTC+2)	Tesche 29', 90+2'; Holtmann 38'; Zoller 62'	Report	Kaiser 22'; Ducksch 67'; Ochs 90'	Stadium: Vonovia Ruhrstadion; Attendance: 0 Referee: Daniel Schlager

21 April 2021 30	Hannover 96	3–1	Jahn Regensburg	Hanover
18:30 CEST (UTC+2)	Haraguchi 1'; Weydandt 14'; Ducksch 82'	Report	Albers 57'	Stadium: HDI-Arena; Attendance: 0 Referee: Thorben Siewer

25 April 2021 31	SV Sandhausen	4–2	Hannover 96	Sandhausen
13:30 CEST (UTC+2)	Biada 26'; Behrens 68' (pen.), 90+1'; Keita-Ruel 81'	Report	Muslija 42'; Sulejmani 63'	Stadium: BWT-Stadion am Hardtwald; Attendance: 0 Referee: Florian Badstübner

7 May 2021 32	Hannover 96	1–2	Darmstadt 98	Hanover
18:30 CEST (UTC+2)	Ducksch 50'	Report	Mehlem 55'; Honsak 68'	Stadium: HDI-Arena; Attendance: 0 Referee: Arne Aarnink

10 May 2021 26	Holstein Kiel	1–0	Hannover 96	Kiel
18:00 CEST (UTC+2)	Bartels 44'	Report		Stadium: Holstein-Stadion; Attendance: 0 Referee: Manuel Gräfe
Note: The match was originally scheduled for 19 March 2021, 18:30 CET, but was postponed to 14 April 2021, 18:30 CEST because both teams were quarantined after players tested positive for COVID-19. It was postponed again because Holstein Kiel was quarantined again after more players tested positive for COVID-19.

16 May 2021 33	FC St. Pauli	1–2	Hannover 96	Hamburg
15:30 CEST (UTC+2)	Burgstaller 70'	Report	Ducksch 13'; Hult 59'	Stadium: Millerntor-Stadion; Attendance: 0 Referee: Lasse Koslowski

23 May 2021 34	Hannover 96	1–2	1. FC Nürnberg	Hanover
15:30 CEST (UTC+2)	Ducksch 36'	Report	Shuranov 6', 74'	Stadium: HDI-Arena; Attendance: 0 Referee: Thorben Siewer

=== DFB-Pokal ===
14 September 2020 First round	Würzburger Kickers	2–3	Hannover 96	Würzburg
18:30 CEST (UTC+2)	Feick 89'; Herrmann 90+5' (pen.)	Report	Weydandt 23'; Kaiser 59'; Hübers 78'	Stadium: flyeralarm Arena; Attendance: 0 Referee: Patrick Alt
Note: The match was played behind closed doors due to the COVID-19 pandemic in Germany.

23 December 2020 Second round	Hannover 96	0–3	Werder Bremen	Hanover
20:45 CET (UTC+1)		Report	Gebre Selassie 30'; Sargent 32'; Mbom 60'	Stadium: HDI-Arena; Attendance: 0 Referee: Manuel Gräfe

== Statistics ==
=== Appearances and goals ===
No.	Pos	Player	2. Bundesliga		DFB-Pokal		Total	
No.	Pos	Player	Apps	Goals	Apps	Goals	Apps	Goals
1	GK	(Denmark) Martin Hansen	2	0	0	0	2	0
2	DF	(Croatia) Josip Elez	11+6	0	0	0	17	0
3	DF	(Sweden) Niklas Hult	30	2	1	0	31	2
5	DF	(Guinea) Simon Falette	15+3	0	1	0	19	0
6	MF	(Slovenia) Jaka Bijol	25+5	0	1	0	31	0
7	MF	(Ghana) Patrick Twumasi	6+16	3	0+2	0	24	3
8	MF	(Germany) Mike Frantz	6+7	0	1	0	14	0
9	FW	(Germany) Hendrik Weydandt	20+10	4	2	1	32	5
10	MF	(Japan) Genki Haraguchi	34	9	2	0	36	9
11	MF	(Germany) Linton Maina	7+11	2	0+1	0	19	2
13	MF	(Germany) Dominik Kaiser	28+1	2	2	1	31	3
15	DF	(Germany) Timo Hübers	19+1	2	2	1	22	3
17	FW	(Germany) Marvin Ducksch	30+4	16	2	0	36	16
18	FW	(Cameroon) Franck Evina	0+2	0	0+1	0	3	0
19	FW	(Kosovo) Valmir Sulejmani	12+17	3	1+1	0	31	3
20	MF	(Germany) Philipp Ochs	7+13	2	1	0	21	2
21	DF	(Japan) Sei Muroya	26+6	0	2	0	34	0
22	GK	(Germany) Michael Ratajczak	3	0	1	0	4	0
23	DF	(Turkey) Barış Başdaş	7+10	0	0+1	0	18	0
27	MF	(Ghana) Kingsley Schindler	16+10	0	0+1	0	27	0
28	DF	(Germany) Marcel Franke	24+3	0	2	0	29	0
29	MF	(Germany) Simon Stehle	0+3	0	0	0	3	0
30	GK	(Germany) Marlon Sündermann	0+1	0	0	0	1	0
31	GK	(Germany) Michael Esser	29	0	1	0	30	0
33	MF	(Germany) Tim Walbrecht	0	0	0	0	0	0
33	FW	(Guinea) Moussa Doumbouya	0+7	1	0	0	7	1
34	MF	(Germany) Niklas Tarnat	0+2	0	0	0	2	0
35	MF	(Kosovo) Florent Muslija	15+11	5	0+2	0	28	5
38	FW	(Germany) Mick Gudra	0+4	1	0	0	4	1
40	MF	(United States) McKinze Gaines	0+1	0	0	0	1	0

=== Goalscorers ===
Rank	No.	Pos	Name	2. Bundesliga	DFB-Pokal	Total
1	17	FW	(Germany) Marvin Ducksch	16	0	16
2	10	MF	(Japan) Genki Haraguchi	9	0	9
3	9	FW	(Germany) Hendrik Weydandt	4	1	5
3	35	MF	(Kosovo) Florent Muslija	5	0	5
5	7	MF	(Ghana) Patrick Twumasi	3	0	3
5	13	MF	(Germany) Dominik Kaiser	2	1	3
5	15	DF	(Germany) Timo Hübers	2	1	3
5	19	FW	(Kosovo) Valmir Sulejmani	3	0	3
9	3	DF	(Sweden) Niklas Hult	2	0	2
9	11	MF	(Germany) Linton Maina	2	0	2
9	20	MF	(Germany) Philipp Ochs	2	0	2
12	33	FW	(Guinea) Moussa Doumbouya	1	0	1
12	38	FW	(Germany) Mick Gudra	1	0	1
Own goal				1	0	1
Total				53	3	56

=== Clean sheets ===
Rank	No.	Pos	Name	2. Bundesliga	DFB-Pokal	Total
1	31	GK	(Germany) Michael Esser	8	0	8
2	22	GK	(Germany) Michael Ratajczak	1	0	1
Total				9	0	9

=== Disciplinary record ===
Rank	No.	Pos	Name	2. Bundesliga			DFB-Pokal			Total		
Rank	No.	Pos	Name	Booked	(yellow card) (yellow-red card)	Sent off (straight red)	Booked	(yellow card) (yellow-red card)	Sent off (straight red)	Booked	(yellow card) (yellow-red card)	Sent off (straight red)
1	6	MF	(Slovenia) Jaka Bijol	7	1	0	0	0	0	7	1	0
2	13	MF	(Germany) Dominik Kaiser	7	0	0	0	0	0	7	0	0
3	3	DF	(Sweden) Niklas Hult	6	0	0	0	0	0	6	0	0
3	19	FW	(Kosovo) Valmir Sulejmani	6	0	0	0	0	0	6	0	0
3	28	DF	(Germany) Marcel Franke	6	0	0	0	0	0	6	0	0
6	5	MF	(Guinea) Simon Falette	2	1	0	0	0	0	2	1	0
6	17	FW	(Germany) Marvin Ducksch	4	0	0	1	0	0	5	0	0
8	15	DF	(Germany) Timo Hübers	4	0	0	0	0	0	4	0	0
8	21	DF	(Japan) Sei Muroya	4	0	0	0	0	0	4	0	0
10	23	MF	(Turkey) Barış Başdaş	3	0	0	0	0	0	3	0	0
10	35	MF	(Kosovo) Florent Muslija	3	0	0	0	0	0	3	0	0
12	2	DF	(Croatia) Josip Elez	2	0	0	0	0	0	2	0	0
12	9	FW	(Germany) Hendrik Weydandt	2	0	0	0	0	0	2	0	0
12	10	MF	(Japan) Genki Haraguchi	1	0	0	1	0	0	2	0	0
15	1	GK	(Denmark) Martin Hansen	1	0	0	0	0	0	1	0	0
15	7	MF	(Ghana) Patrick Twumasi	1	0	0	0	0	0	1	0	0
15	8	MF	(Germany) Mike Frantz	1	0	0	0	0	0	1	0	0
15	11	MF	(Germany) Linton Maina	1	0	0	0	0	0	1	0	0
15	38	FW	(Germany) Mick Gudra	1	0	0	0	0	0	1	0	0
Total				62	2	0	2	0	0	64	2	0
