= List of German football transfers winter 2019–20 =

This is a list of German football transfers in the winter transfer window 2019–20 by club. Only transfers of the Bundesliga, and 2. Bundesliga are included.

== Bundesliga ==
Note: Flags indicate national team as has been defined under FIFA eligibility rules. Players may hold more than one non-FIFA nationality.

=== FC Bayern Munich ===
In:

No.	Pos.	Nation	Player
2	DF	ESP	Álvaro Odriozola (on loan from Real Madrid)

Out:

No.	Pos.	Nation	Player

=== Borussia Dortmund ===
In:

No.	Pos.	Nation	Player
17	FW	NOR	Erling Haaland (from Red Bull Salzburg)
27	MF	GER	Emre Can (on loan from Juventus)

Out:

No.	Pos.	Nation	Player
9	FW	ESP	Paco Alcácer (to Villarreal)
33	MF	GER	Julian Weigl (to Benfica)
34	FW	DEN	Jacob Bruun Larsen (to 1899 Hoffenheim)

=== RB Leipzig ===
In:

No.	Pos.	Nation	Player
3	DF	ESP	Angeliño (on loan from Manchester City)
25	MF	ESP	Dani Olmo (from Dinamo Zagreb)

Out:

No.	Pos.	Nation	Player
3	DF	URU	Marcelo Saracchi (on loan to Galatasaray)
13	MF	AUT	Stefan Ilsanker (to Eintracht Frankfurt)
20	FW	BRA	Matheus Cunha (to Hertha BSC)
31	MF	GER	Diego Demme (to Napoli)
36	DF	BRA	Luan Cândido (on loan to Red Bull Bragantino)
—	FW	FRA	Jean-Kévin Augustin (on loan to Leeds United, previously on loan at Monaco)
—	MF	GER	Elias Abouchabaka (to Vitória Guimarães, previously on loan at Greuther Fürth)

=== Bayer 04 Leverkusen ===
In:

No.	Pos.	Nation	Player
12	DF	BFA	Edmond Tapsoba (from Vitória de Guimarães)
25	MF	ARG	Exequiel Palacios (from River Plate)

Out:

No.	Pos.	Nation	Player
3	DF	GRE	Panagiotis Retsos (on loan to Sheffield United)
17	FW	FIN	Joel Pohjanpalo (on loan to Hamburger SV)

=== Borussia Mönchengladbach ===
In:

No.	Pos.	Nation	Player

Out:

No.	Pos.	Nation	Player
15	DF	GER	Jordan Beyer (on loan to Hamburger SV)
20	FW	PAR	Julio Villalba (on loan to SCR Altach)
40	DF	DEN	Andreas Poulsen (on loan to Austria Wien)

=== VfL Wolfsburg ===
In:

No.	Pos.	Nation	Player
22	DF	CRO	Marin Pongračić (from Red Bull Salzburg)

Out:

No.	Pos.	Nation	Player
5	DF	NED	Jeffrey Bruma (on loan to Mainz 05)
10	MF	TUR	Yunus Mallı (on loan to Union Berlin)
22	FW	GER	Lukas Nmecha (loan return to Manchester City)
37	MF	GER	Elvis Rexhbeçaj (on loan to 1. FC Köln)
—	MF	CMR	Paul-Georges Ntep (released, previously on loan at Kayserispor)

=== Eintracht Frankfurt ===
In:

No.	Pos.	Nation	Player
3	MF	AUT	Stefan Ilsanker (from RB Leipzig)

Out:

No.	Pos.	Nation	Player
3	DF	GUI	Simon Falette (on loan to Fenerbahçe)
7	FW	SRB	Dejan Joveljić (on loan to Anderlecht)
27	FW	GER	Nicolai Müller (to Western Sydney Wanderers)

=== Werder Bremen ===
In:

No.	Pos.	Nation	Player
3	DF	GER	Kevin Vogt (on loan from 1899 Hoffenheim)
9	FW	GER	Davie Selke (on loan from Hertha BSC)

Out:

No.	Pos.	Nation	Player
—	DF	SWE	Felix Beijmo (on loan to Greuther Fürth, previously on loan at Malmö)

=== 1899 Hoffenheim ===
In:

No.	Pos.	Nation	Player
7	FW	DEN	Jacob Bruun Larsen (from Borussia Dortmund)
10	FW	ISR	Mu'nas Dabbur (from Sevilla)
28	GK	GER	Michael Esser (from Hannover 96)
—	GK	SLO	Domen Gril (from NK Bravo)

Out:

No.	Pos.	Nation	Player
2	DF	NED	Joshua Brenet (on loan to Vitesse)
7	MF	GER	Lukas Rupp (to Norwich City)
20	MF	AUT	Robert Žulj (to VfL Bochum)
22	DF	GER	Kevin Vogt (on loan to Werder Bremen)
30	MF	GER	Philipp Ochs (to Hannover 96)
37	FW	NED	Jürgen Locadia (loan return to Brighton & Hove Albion)
—	GK	SLO	Domen Gril (on loan to NK Bravo)
—	FW	BRA	Bruno Nazário (on loan to Botafogo, previously on loan at Athletico Paranaense)
—	FW	BRA	Felipe Pires (on loan to Rijeka, previously on loan at Fortaleza)

=== Fortuna Düsseldorf ===
In:

No.	Pos.	Nation	Player
9	FW	POL	Dawid Kownacki (from Sampdoria, previously on loan)
10	MF	KOS	Valon Berisha (on loan from Lazio)
19	DF	DEN	Mathias Jørgensen (on loan from Fenerbahçe)
20	FW	GER	Steven Skrzybski (on loan from Schalke 04)

Out:

No.	Pos.	Nation	Player
19	FW	CRO	Davor Lovren (on loan to Slaven Belupo)
34	MF	ENG	Lewis Baker (loan return to Chelsea)

=== Hertha BSC ===
In:

No.	Pos.	Nation	Player
7	FW	POL	Krzysztof Piątek (from Milan)
10	FW	BRA	Matheus Cunha (from RB Leipzig)
18	MF	ARG	Santiago Ascacíbar (from VfB Stuttgart)
—	MF	FRA	Lucas Tousart (from Lyon)

Out:

No.	Pos.	Nation	Player
7	MF	GER	Eduard Löwen (on loan to FC Augsburg)
26	MF	GER	Sidney Friede (to Wehen Wiesbaden)
27	FW	GER	Davie Selke (on loan to Werder Bremen)
29	MF	SVK	Ondrej Duda (on loan to Norwich City)
32	FW	GER	Dennis Jastrzembski (on loan to SC Paderborn 07)
33	FW	NED	Daishawn Redan (on loan to Groningen)
34	FW	GER	Maurice Covic (on loan to Ascoli)
—	MF	FRA	Lucas Tousart (on loan to Lyon)

=== 1. FSV Mainz 05 ===
In:

No.	Pos.	Nation	Player
13	DF	NED	Jeffrey Bruma (on loan from VfL Wolfsburg)

Out:

No.	Pos.	Nation	Player
10	MF	ROU	Alexandru Maxim (on loan to Gaziantep)
31	DF	GER	Ahmet Gürleyen (on loan to Liefering)
36	FW	GER	Aaron Seydel (on loan to Jahn Regensburg)

=== SC Freiburg ===
In:

No.	Pos.	Nation	Player

Out:

No.	Pos.	Nation	Player
13	MF	GER	Marco Terrazzino (on loan to Dynamo Dresden)
20	MF	GER	Jérôme Gondorf (on loan to Karlsruher SC)
29	FW	KOR	Jeong Woo-yeong (on loan to Bayern Munich II)

=== FC Schalke 04 ===
In:

No.	Pos.	Nation	Player
11	FW	AUT	Michael Gregoritsch (on loan from FC Augsburg)
21	DF	FRA	Jean-Clair Todibo (on loan from Barcelona)

Out:

No.	Pos.	Nation	Player
7	FW	GER	Mark Uth (on loan to 1. FC Köln)
10	MF	ALG	Nabil Bentaleb (on loan to Newcastle United)
21	FW	GER	Fabian Reese (to Holstein Kiel)
22	FW	GER	Steven Skrzybski (on loan to Fortuna Düsseldorf)
27	DF	GER	Jonas Carls (on loan to Viktoria Köln)

=== FC Augsburg ===
In:

No.	Pos.	Nation	Player
29	MF	GER	Eduard Löwen (on loan from Hertha BSC)

Out:

No.	Pos.	Nation	Player
3	DF	DEN	Mads Valentin (on loan to Zürich)
11	FW	AUT	Michael Gregoritsch (on loan to Schalke 04)
30	FW	BRA	Caiuby (released)

=== 1. FC Köln ===
In:

No.	Pos.	Nation	Player
20	MF	GER	Elvis Rexhbeçaj (on loan from VfL Wolfsburg)
23	FW	GER	Mark Uth (on loan from Schalke 04)
37	DF	GER	Toni Leistner (on loan from Queens Park Rangers)

Out:

No.	Pos.	Nation	Player
3	DF	GER	Lasse Sobiech (on loan to Excel Mouscron)
13	MF	AUT	Louis Schaub (on loan to Hamburger SV)
21	MF	FRA	Vincent Koziello (on loan to Paris)
35	DF	GER	Matthias Bader (to Darmstadt 98)
39	MF	MKD	Darko Churlinov (to VfB Stuttgart)

=== SC Paderborn 07 ===
In:

No.	Pos.	Nation	Player
6	MF	ISL	Samúel Friðjónsson (from Vålerenga, previously on loan at Viking)
18	FW	GER	Dennis Srbeny (from Norwich City)
26	MF	ENG	Antony Evans (from Everton)
32	FW	GER	Dennis Jastrzembski (on loan from Hertha BSC)

Out:

No.	Pos.	Nation	Player
1	GK	GER	Michael Ratajczak (to Hannover 96)
10	MF	BRA	Cauly (to Ludogorets Razgrad)
14	FW	USA	Khiry Shelton (to Sporting Kansas City)
27	FW	SEN	Babacar Guèye (to Karlsruher SC)
—	MF	GER	Marcel Hilßner (on loan to Hallescher FC)
—	MF	GER	Johannes Dörfler (on loan to FSV Zwickau)

=== 1. FC Union Berlin ===
In:

No.	Pos.	Nation	Player
18	MF	TUR	Yunus Mallı (on loan from VfL Wolfsburg)

Out:

No.	Pos.	Nation	Player
18	DF	GER	Nicolai Rapp (on loan to Darmstadt 98)
33	DF	USA	Lennard Maloney (on loan to Chemnitzer FC)
—	GK	GER	Lennart Moser (on loan to Cercle Brugge, previously on loan at Energie Cottbus)

== 2. Bundesliga ==
=== VfB Stuttgart ===
In:

No.	Pos.	Nation	Player
5	DF	ENG	Nathaniel Phillips (on loan from Liverpool)
6	MF	ENG	Clinton Mola (from Chelsea U23)
19	MF	MKD	Darko Churlinov (from 1. FC Köln)

Out:

No.	Pos.	Nation	Player
2	DF	ARG	Emiliano Insúa (to LA Galaxy)
5	DF	ENG	Nathaniel Phillips (loan return to Liverpool)
6	MF	ARG	Santiago Ascacíbar (to Hertha BSC)
—	MF	GHA	Ebenezer Ofori (to AIK, previously on loan at New York City)

=== Hannover 96 ===
In:

No.	Pos.	Nation	Player
9	FW	SWE	John Guidetti (on loan from Deportivo Alavés)
13	MF	GER	Dominik Kaiser (from Brøndby)
20	MF	GER	Philipp Ochs (from 1899 Hoffenheim)
23	GK	GER	Michael Ratajczak (from SC Paderborn 07)
25	GK	DEN	Martin Hansen (from Strømsgodset)

Out:

No.	Pos.	Nation	Player
19	FW	SWE	Emil Hansson (on loan to RKC Waalwijk)
20	MF	GER	Dennis Aogo (released)
23	GK	GER	Michael Esser (to 1899 Hoffenheim)

=== 1. FC Nürnberg ===
In:

No.	Pos.	Nation	Player
3	DF	GRE	Konstantinos Mavropanos (on loan from Arsenal)
19	DF	GER	Philip Heise (on loan from Norwich City)
21	GK	GER	Felix Dornebusch (free agent)

Out:

No.	Pos.	Nation	Player
20	MF	AUT	Lukas Jäger (to Sturm Graz)
31	MF	CZE	Ondřej Petrák (on loan to Dynamo Dresden)
35	MF	GER	Alexander Fuchs (to SpVgg Unterhaching)

=== Hamburger SV ===
In:

No.	Pos.	Nation	Player
15	DF	GER	Jordan Beyer (on loan from Borussia Mönchengladbach)
19	FW	FIN	Joel Pohjanpalo (on loan from Bayer Leverkusen)
20	MF	AUT	Louis Schaub (on loan from 1. FC Köln)

Out:

No.	Pos.	Nation	Player
34	MF	GER	Jonas David (on loan to Würzburger Kickers)

=== 1. FC Heidenheim ===
In:

No.	Pos.	Nation	Player
24	MF	GER	Tobias Mohr (from SpVgg Greuther Fürth)

Out:

No.	Pos.	Nation	Player
23	MF	COD	Merveille Biankadi (on loan to Eintracht Braunschweig)
32	FW	GER	Patrick Schmidt (on loan to Dynamo Dresden)
—	DF	GER	Oliver Steurer (on loan to SC Preußen Münster, previously on loan at KFC Uerdingen 05)

=== Holstein Kiel ===
In:

No.	Pos.	Nation	Player
32	FW	GER	Fabian Reese (from Schalke 04)

Out:

No.	Pos.	Nation	Player
11	FW	GER	Daniel Hanslik (on loan to Hansa Rostock)

=== Arminia Bielefeld ===
In:

No.	Pos.	Nation	Player
13	FW	GER	Sebastian Müller (from 1. FC Köln youth)
34	GK	SWE	Oscar Linnér (from AIK)

Out:

No.	Pos.	Nation	Player

=== Jahn Regensburg ===
In:

No.	Pos.	Nation	Player
24	FW	GER	Aaron Seydel (on loan from Mainz 05)
26	FW	GER	Charalambos Makridis (from Borussia Mönchengladbach II)
30	GK	GER	Kevin Kunz (from Austria Lustenau)

Out:

No.	Pos.	Nation	Player
3	DF	GER	Alexander Nandzik (on loan to 1. FC Kaiserslautern)
33	GK	GER	André Weis (to Viktoria Köln)

=== FC St. Pauli ===
In:

No.	Pos.	Nation	Player
40	GK	GER	Korbinian Müller (free agent)

Out:

No.	Pos.	Nation	Player
14	MF	NOR	Mats Møller Dæhli (to KRC Genk)
22	FW	TUR	Cenk Şahin (to Kayserispor)

=== SV Darmstadt 98 ===
In:

No.	Pos.	Nation	Player
23	DF	GER	Nicolai Rapp (on loan from 1. FC Union Berlin)
26	DF	GER	Matthias Bader (from 1. FC Köln)

Out:

No.	Pos.	Nation	Player
2	DF	ENG	Mandela Egbo (to New York Red Bulls)

=== VfL Bochum ===
In:

No.	Pos.	Nation	Player
24	DF	GRE	Vassilis Lambropoulos (on loan from Deportivo La Coruña)
32	MF	AUT	Robert Žulj (from 1899 Hoffenheim)

Out:

No.	Pos.	Nation	Player
26	MF	GER	Görkem Sağlam (to Willem II)

=== Dynamo Dresden ===
In:

No.	Pos.	Nation	Player
8	MF	CZE	Josef Hušbauer (on loan from Slavia Prague)
9	FW	GER	Patrick Schmidt (on loan from 1. FC Heidenheim)
10	MF	GER	Marco Terrazzino (on loan from SC Freiburg)
13	FW	DEN	Simon Makienok (from Utrecht)
14	MF	CZE	Ondřej Petrák (on loan from 1. FC Nürnberg)
25	FW	GHA	Godsway Donyoh (on loan from Nordsjælland)

Out:

No.	Pos.	Nation	Player
14	FW	SEN	Moussa Koné (to Nîmes)
22	MF	AUT	Patrick Möschl (to 1. FC Magdeburg)
30	MF	AUT	Matthäus Taferner (on loan to Wacker Innsbruck)
37	FW	SLO	Luka Štor (on loan to Aluminij)

=== SpVgg Greuther Fürth ===
In:

No.	Pos.	Nation	Player
21	MF	GER	Timothy Tillman (from Bayern Munich II)
22	DF	SWE	Felix Beijmo (on loan from Werder Bremen, previously on loan at Malmö)

Out:

No.	Pos.	Nation	Player
8	MF	GER	Elias Abouchabaka (loan return to RB Leipzig)
9	FW	GER	Shawn Parker (released)
29	MF	GER	Tobias Mohr (to 1. FC Heidenheim)
31	FW	GER	Daniel Steininger (to 1. FC Magdeburg)

=== Erzgebirge Aue ===
In:

No.	Pos.	Nation	Player
2	DF	DEN	Jacob Rasmussen (on loan from Fiorentina)

Out:

No.	Pos.	Nation	Player
6	MF	GER	Hikmet Çiftçi (to 1. FC Kaiserslautern)

=== SV Sandhausen ===
In:

No.	Pos.	Nation	Player

Out:

No.	Pos.	Nation	Player
25	MF	GER	Felix Müller (to SpVgg Unterhaching)

=== VfL Osnabrürck ===
In:

No.	Pos.	Nation	Player
11	FW	GAM	Assan Ceesay (on loan from Zürich)

Out:

No.	Pos.	Nation	Player
11	MF	GER	Nico Granatowski (on loan to Hansa Rostock)
28	FW	AUT	Kevin Friesenbichler (to Sturm Graz)
30	FW	GER	Alexander Riemann (to Wacker Burghausen)

=== Karlsruher SC ===
In:

No.	Pos.	Nation	Player
24	FW	SEN	Babacar Guèye (from SC Paderborn 07)
26	MF	GER	Jérôme Gondorf (on loan from SC Freiburg)
32	MF	TUN	Änis Ben-Hatira (free agent)

Out:

No.	Pos.	Nation	Player
9	FW	GER	Marvin Pourié (on loan to Eintracht Braunschweig)
14	FW	GER	Saliou Sané (to Würzburger Kickers)
31	FW	TUR	Malik Batmaz (on loan to VfB Stuttgart II)

=== Wehen Wiesbaden ===
In:

No.	Pos.	Nation	Player
34	GK	AUT	Heinz Lindner (free agent)
37	MF	GER	Sidney Friede (from Hertha BSC)

Out:

No.	Pos.	Nation	Player

== See also ==
- 2019–20 Bundesliga
- 2019–20 2. Bundesliga
