= Mike Frantz =

German footballer (born 1986)

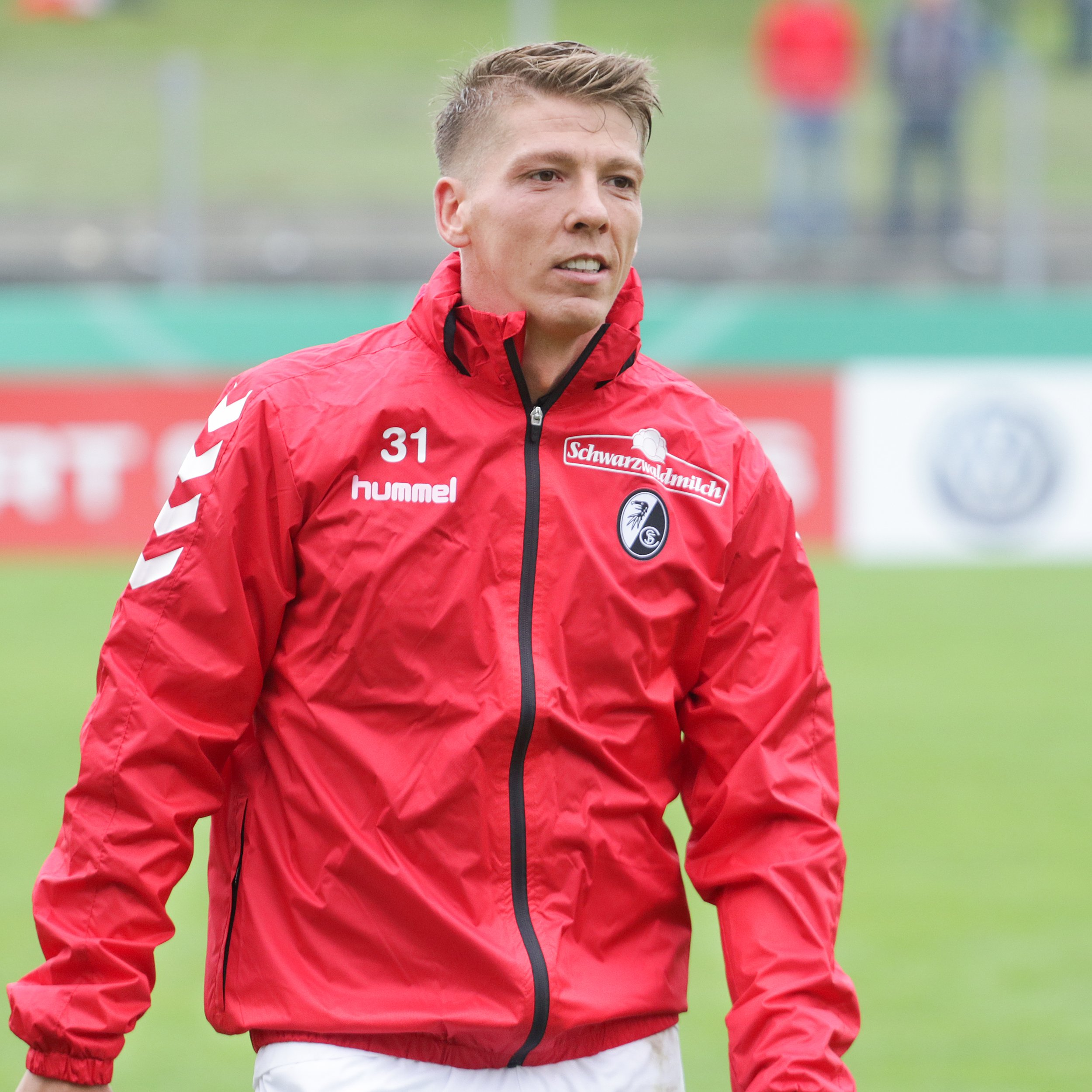
- Frantz with SC Freiburg in 2017

Personal information
- Date of birth: 14 October 1986 (age 40)
- Place of birth: Saarbrücken, West Germany
- Height: 1.80 m (5 ft 11 in)
- Position: Midfielder

Youth career
- 1994–1998: DJK Folsterhöhe
- 1998–2000: AFC Saarbrücken
- 2000–2004: 1. FC Saarbrücken
- 2004: Borussia Neunkirchen

Senior career*
Years	Team	Apps	(Gls)
2005–2006	Borussia Neunkirchen	39	(8)
2006	1. FC Saarbrücken II	12	(4)
2007–2008	1. FC Saarbrücken	41	(14)
2008–2014	1. FC Nürnberg	125	(10)
2008–2012	1. FC Nürnberg II	9	(2)
2014–2020	SC Freiburg	150	(12)
2020–2022	Hannover 96	21	(0)
2022–2023	1. FC Saarbrücken	14	(0)
Total		410	(50)
- * Club domestic league appearances and goals as of 27 May 2023

Mike Frantz (born 14 October 1986) is a German former professional footballer who played as a midfielder.

== Career ==
In July 2008, Frantz moved from 1. FC Saarbrücken to 1. FC Nürnberg.

On 13 June 2014, he joined SC Freiburg.

On 22 July 2020, Frantz joined Hannover 96 on a two-year contract.

Ahead of the 2022–23 season, Frantz returned to 1. FC Saarbrücken, signing a one-year contract.

== Career statistics ==
As of match played 27 May 2023

Appearances and goals by club, season and competition
Club	Season	League			Cup		Europe		Other		Total	
Club	Season	Division	Apps	Goals	Apps	Goals	Apps	Goals	Apps	Goals	Apps	Goals
Borussia Neunkirchen	2004–05	Oberliga Südwest	9	2	—		—		—		9	2
Borussia Neunkirchen	2005–06	Oberliga Südwest	29	6	—		—		—		29	6
Borussia Neunkirchen	Total		38	8	—		—		—		38	8
1. FC Saarbrücken II	2006–07	Oberliga Südwest	12	4	—		—		—		12	4
1. FC Saarbrücken	2006–07	Regionalliga Süd	14	2	—		—		—		14	2
1. FC Saarbrücken	2007–08	Oberliga Südwest	27	12	—		—		—		27	12
1. FC Saarbrücken	Total		41	14	—		—		—		41	14
1. FC Nürnberg	2008–09	2. Bundesliga	16	2	0	0	—		2	0	18	2
1. FC Nürnberg	2009–10	Bundesliga	24	3	0	0	—		2	0	26	3
1. FC Nürnberg	2010–11	Bundesliga	14	2	2	0	—		—		16	2
1. FC Nürnberg	2011–12	Bundesliga	13	1	0	0	—		—		13	1
1. FC Nürnberg	2012–13	Bundesliga	27	1	1	0	—		—		28	1
1. FC Nürnberg	2013–14	Bundesliga	31	1	1	0	—		—		32	1
1. FC Nürnberg	Total		125	10	4	0	—		4	0	133	10
1. FC Nürnberg II	2008–09	Regionalliga Süd	3	0	—		—		—		3	0
1. FC Nürnberg II	2011–12	Regionalliga Süd	6	2	—		—		—		6	2
1. FC Nürnberg II	Total		9	2	—		—		—		9	2
SC Freiburg	2014–15	Bundesliga	25	4	2	0	—		—		27	4
SC Freiburg	2015–16	2. Bundesliga	31	6	2	0	—		—		33	6
SC Freiburg	2016–17	Bundesliga	30	0	0	0	—		—		30	0
SC Freiburg	2017–18	Bundesliga	15	0	2	0	2	0	—		19	0
SC Freiburg	2018–19	Bundesliga	31	2	2	1	—		—		33	3
SC Freiburg	2019–20	Bundesliga	18	0	2	0	—		—		20	0
SC Freiburg	Total		150	12	10	1	2	0	—		162	13
Hannover 96	2020–21	2. Bundesliga	13	0	1	0	—		—		14	0
Hannover 96	2021–22	2. Bundesliga	8	0	1	0	—		—		9	0
Hannover 96	Total		21	0	2	0	—		—		23	0
1. FC Saarbrücken	2022–23	3. Liga	14	0	—		—		—		14	0
Career total			410	50	16	1	2	0	4	0	433	51
