= Niklas Hult =

Swedish footballer (born 1990)

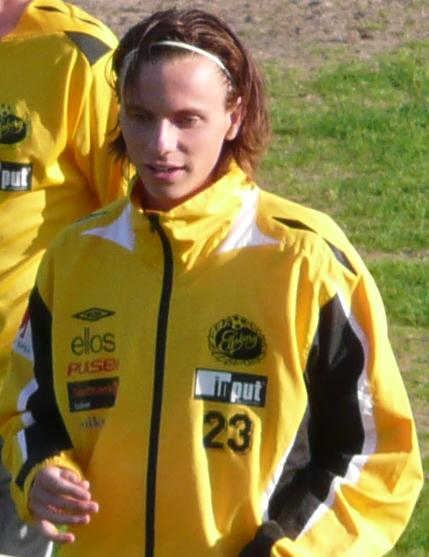
- Hult with Elfsborg in 2009

Personal information
- Full name: Bo Niklas Hult
- Date of birth: 13 February 1990 (age 36)
- Place of birth: Värnamo, Sweden
- Height: 1.73 m (5 ft 8 in)
- Position: Left-back

Team information
- Current team: IF Elfsborg
- Number: 23

Youth career
- 1999–2008: IFK Värnamo

Senior career*
Years	Team	Apps	(Gls)
2007–2008	IFK Värnamo	22	(1)
2009–2014	IF Elfsborg	92	(11)
2014–2016	Nice	45	(2)
2016	→ Nice II	1	(0)
2016–2018	Panathinaikos	42	(0)
2018–2020	AEK Athens	44	(0)
2020–2022	Hannover 96	57	(3)
2022–	IF Elfsborg	105	(3)

International career
2007	Sweden U17	3	(0)
2008–2009	Sweden U19	8	(0)
2011–2012	Sweden U21	13	(0)
2012–2018	Sweden	8	(0)
- * Club domestic league appearances and goals as of 8 July 2026

Bo Niklas Hult (born 13 February 1990) is a Swedish professional footballer who plays as a left back for IF Elfsborg. Beginning his career with IFK Värnamo in 2008, he went on to represent Elfsborg, Nice, Panathinaikos, AEK Athens, and Hannover 96 before returning to Swedish football in 2022. A full international between 2012 and 2018, he won eight caps for the Sweden national team.

== Club career ==
=== Nice ===
In May 2014, Niklas Hult was signed by Ligue 1 club OGC Nice for a fee around €1 million, as they looked to strengthen for the 2014–15 season. He was described as a midfield workhorse with attacking and defensive qualities.

=== Panathinaikos ===
On 30 June 2016, he signed a three-years contract with Super League Greece club Panathinaikos for a transfer fee of €300,000. His contract, which ran until 2019, was worth €250,000 per year.

During the summer of 2017, the Swedish international rejected a suggestion from Standard Liège, and at the same time he filed an appeal claiming his late payment from Panathinaikos. Later in the summer, the player's side claimed that the international left-back could leave as free from the club, either for Konyaspor or Standard Liège that was once again interested in his acquisition. Hult had no trouble withdrawing his appeal as long as he had a raise in his annual salary and extending his contract for another year. The greens put all the odds down, and as they figured that the player was one of the best player in the roster, on 21 July 2017, took the decision to table a new proposal for co-operation and increase his annual earnings by more than €100,000 while expanding his contract by 2020, that make the player's side to respond positively. Unfortunately during the 2017–18 season the financial problems of the club remained unresolved with Hult reportedly looking his next step in his career.

On 30 January 2018, after his first appeal, Hult took again legal actions against Panathinaikos because of the money the Greens owe to him. He had not received his December's fee and in order to ensure his money decided to sue financially struggling greens. Nevertheless, between two sides there are negotiations in order to find a mutual solution and Panathinaikos receive money from his possible transfer in January's window.

=== AEK Athens ===
On 31 January 2018, Hult signed a two-and-a-half-year contract with rivals AEK Athens for an estimated amount of €200,000. In the 2019–20 season Hult competed in 18 matches for AEK across all competitions, with the 30-year-old Swedish having previously won the Super League two years ago after transferring from Panathinaikos in January 2018. On 30 June 2020, he mutually solved his contract with the club.

=== Hannover 96 ===
On 28 August 2020, Hult signed a two-year contract with German club Hannover 96.

=== Return to Sweden ===
After his contract with Hannover expired, Hult signed a three-year contract with IF Elfsborg, where he had previously played from 2009 to 2014.

== Career statistics ==
=== Club ===
As of 15 July 2022

Club	Season	League			Cup		Continental		Other		Total	
Club	Season	Division	Apps	Goals	Apps	Goals	Apps	Goals	Apps	Goals	Apps	Goals
IF Elfsborg	2009	Allsvenskan	1	0	1	0	0	0	—		2	0
IF Elfsborg	2010	Allsvenskan	9	1	0	0	0	0	—		9	1
IF Elfsborg	2011	Allsvenskan	28	6	3	1	3	0	—		34	7
IF Elfsborg	2012	Allsvenskan	27	3	0	0	3	1	—		30	4
IF Elfsborg	2013	Allsvenskan	17	1	6	3	5	3	—		28	7
IF Elfsborg	2014	Allsvenskan	10	0	0	0	7	1	—		17	1
IF Elfsborg	Total		92	11	10	4	18	5	0	0	120	20
Nice	2014–15	Ligue 1	30	1	1	0	—		0	0	31	1
Nice	2015–16	Ligue 1	15	1	0	0	—		1	0	16	1
Nice	Total		45	2	1	0	0	0	1	0	47	2
Panathinaikos	2016–17	Super League Greece	30	0	5	0	6	0	—		41	0
Panathinaikos	2017–18	Super League Greece	12	0	0	0	4	0	—		16	0
Panathinaikos	Total		42	0	5	0	10	0	—		57	0
AEK Athens	2017–18	Super League Greece	8	0	3	0	0	0	—		11	0
AEK Athens	2018–19	Super League Greece	22	0	6	0	10	0	—		38	0
AEK Athens	2019–20	Super League Greece	14	0	3	0	1	0	—		18	0
AEK Athens	Total		44	0	12	0	11	0	—		67	0
Hannover 96	2020–21	2. Bundesliga	30	2	1	0	—		—		31	2
Hannover 96	2021–22	2. Bundesliga	27	1	4	0	—		—		31	1
Hannover 96	Total		57	3	5	0	—		—		62	3
IF Elfsborg	2022	Allsvenskan	0	0	0	0	0	0	—		0	0
Career total			280	16	33	4	39	5	1	0	353	25

=== International ===
Appearances and goals by national team and year
National team	Year	Apps	Goals
Sweden	2012	2	0
Sweden	2013	0	0
Sweden	2014	2	0
Sweden	2015	0	0
Sweden	2016	0	0
Sweden	2017	2	0
Sweden	2018	2	0
Total		8	0

== Honours ==
IF Elfsborg

- Allsvenskan: 2012

AEK Athens

- Super League: 2017–18
