= Marvin Ducksch =

German footballer (born 1994)

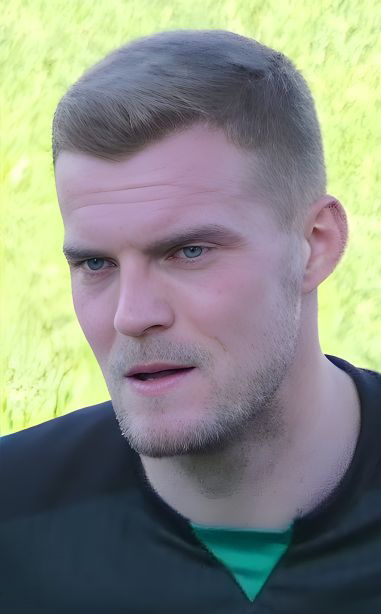
- Ducksch with Werder Bremen in 2021

Personal information
- Full name: Marvin Ducksch
- Date of birth: 7 March 1994 (age 32)
- Place of birth: Dortmund, Germany
- Height: 1.88 m (6 ft 2 in)
- Position: Striker

Team information
- Current team: Birmingham City
- Number: 33

Youth career
- 1998–2002: BSV Fortuna Dortmund 58
- 2002–2013: Borussia Dortmund

Senior career*
Years	Team	Apps	(Gls)
2012–2016	Borussia Dortmund II	84	(36)
2013–2015	Borussia Dortmund	6	(0)
2014–2015	→ SC Paderborn (loan)	9	(1)
2016–2018	FC St. Pauli	10	(1)
2017–2018	→ Holstein Kiel (loan)	49	(23)
2018–2019	Fortuna Düsseldorf	16	(1)
2019–2021	Hannover 96	66	(32)
2021–2025	Werder Bremen	128	(52)
2025–	Birmingham City	40	(10)

International career
2009	Germany U15	2	(1)
2009–2010	Germany U16	5	(4)
2010–2011	Germany U17	15	(4)
2012	Germany U18	1	(1)
2023	Germany	2	(0)
Medal record
Germany
Runner-up	UEFA Under-17 Championship	2011
Third place	FIFA U-17 World Cup	2011
- * Club domestic league appearances and goals as of 25 October 2026 (UTC)

Marvin Ducksch (German pronunciation: [ˈmaːʁvɪn dʊkʃ]; born 7 March 1994) is a German professional footballer who plays as a striker for EFL Championship club Birmingham City. He was capped twice by the Germany national team.

== Club career ==
=== Early career ===
Ducksch began playing football at the age of four and was enrolled at the academy of BSV Fortuna Dortmund 58 in 1998, where he was initially trained by his father, Klaus Ducksch, who was the coach of the club at the time. In the 2002–03 season Ducksch was scouted by Borussia Dortmund and enrolled into the Borussia Dortmund academy at the age of eight.

=== Borussia Dortmund ===
Ducksch, in the first half of the 2011–12 season playing with the BVB Academy U-19, scored 16 goals in 26 games.

In the second half of the 2011–12 season, Ducksch was promoted to Dortmund's second team and played his first match with Borussia Dortmund II on 28 January 2012 in a 2–1 victory over the second team of Bayer Leverkusen in the Regionalliga West. After playing a few matches with Borussia Dortmund II in the Regionalliga, Ducksch scored seven goals in five consecutive games scoring braces each against Fortuna Köln, SV Elversberg and single goals against Mainz 05 II, 1. FC Köln II and Eintracht Frankfurt II. Borussia Dortmund II secured promotion to the 3. Liga.

In the 2012–13 season, Ducksch made his professional football debut on 3 August 2012 in a Borussia Dortmund II match against Alemannia Aachen in the 2012–13 3. Liga season, and on 18 May 2013, Ducksch scored the only goal in Borussia Dortmund II's 1–0 away victory against the second team of VfB Stuttgart.

In the 2013–14 Bundesliga season, Ducksch was inducted into the Borussia Dortmund first team and on 3 August 2013, in Borussia Dortmund's first round match of the 2013–14 DFB-Pokal and 3–0 victory over SV Wilhelmshaven he scored his first goal for the senior team in his first match for Borussia Dortmund.

In June 2014 he was loaned to SC Paderborn for the 2014–15 season.

=== FC St. Pauli ===
On 15 June 2016, Ducksch joined 2. Bundesliga side FC St. Pauli signing a three-year contract until 2019. His unveiling made international headlines when Ewald Lienen, the St. Pauli manager at the time, was unable to make it to the event, so a man in a Lienen mask appeared instead.

==== Holstein Kiel loan ====
In January 2017, Ducksch joined Holstein Kiel on loan for the second half of the season. In 17 matches, he scored five goals and made four assists contributing to Holstein's promotion to the 2. Bundesliga. In June, his loan was extended for the 2017–18 season. He finished the 2017–18 season with 18 goals and 12 assists in 33 matches while Holstein Kiel finished in third place but missed out on promotion to the Bundesliga in the relegation playoffs.

=== Fortuna Düsseldorf ===
In June 2018, Ducksch joined Fortuna Düsseldorf, newly promoted to the Bundesliga, on a four-year contract.

=== Hannover 96 ===
After only one year at Düsseldorf, it was confirmed on 28 June 2019, that Ducksch had joined Hannover 96 on a three-year contract.

=== Werder Bremen ===
On 25 August 2021, Ducksch transferred to Werder Bremen, signing a three-year contract. Four days later, he scored a brace on his debut, a 3–0 win against Hansa Rostock in the 2. Bundesliga.

=== Birmingham City ===
On 7 August 2025, Ducksch signed a three-season contract with Birmingham City. On 22 November, he scored his first goals for the club, netting a brace in a 4–1 victory over Norwich City.

== International career ==
Ducksch played in 2009 and 2010 for the U15 and U16 Germany youth national teams. He debuted for the Germany U17 on 4 September 2010 in an international friendly in Stadthagen against Azerbaijan. Ducksch represented the Germany U17 at the 2011 UEFA European Under-17 Football Championship where Germany finished runner-up in Serbia. In 2011, he represented the Germany U17 team at the 2011 FIFA U-17 World Cup in which Germany secured a third-place finish in Mexico. Ducksch scored in the group stage of the 2011 FIFA U-17 World Cup against Ecuador, and then scored once again in the team's 4–0 win in the second round of the 2011 FIFA U-17 World Cup against the United States; Ducksch's teammate Koray Günter also scored in the German 4–0 victory.

Ducksch was called for the first time with the Germany national team for the friendly matches against Turkey and Austria on 18 and 21 November 2023, respectively.

== Personal life ==
On 14 April 2026, while at Birmingham City, Ducksch was charged in relation to an offence of driving with excess alcohol. On 20 May 2026, he was fined £16,000 and banned from driving for 14 months.

== Career statistics ==
=== Club ===
As of match played 10 October 2026

Appearances and goals by club, season and competition
Club	Season	League			National cup (Note: Includes DFB-Pokal, FA Cup)		League cup (Note: Includes EFL Cup)		Other		Total	
Club	Season	Division	Apps	Goals	Apps	Goals	Apps	Goals	Apps	Goals	Apps	Goals
Borussia Dortmund II	2011–12	Regionalliga West	18	7	—		—		—		18	7
Borussia Dortmund II	2012–13	3. Liga	12	2	—		—		—		12	2
Borussia Dortmund II	2013–14	3. Liga	26	12	—		—		—		26	12
Borussia Dortmund II	2015–16	Regionalliga West	28	15	—		—		—		28	15
Borussia Dortmund II	Total		84	36	—		—		—		84	36
Borussia Dortmund	2013–14	Bundesliga	6	0	2	1	—		0	0	8	1
SC Paderborn (loan)	2014–15	Bundesliga	9	1	0	0	—		—		9	1
FC St. Pauli	2016–17	2. Bundesliga	10	1	2	1	—		—		12	2
Holstein Kiel (loan)	2016–17	3. Liga	16	5	—		—		—		16	5
Holstein Kiel (loan)	2017–18	2. Bundesliga	33	18	2	1	—		2 (Note: Appearances in 2. Bundesliga promotion play-offs)	0	37	19
Holstein Kiel (loan)	Total		49	23	2	1	—		2	0	53	24
Fortuna Düsseldorf	2018–19	Bundesliga	16	1	3	3	—		—		19	4
Hannover 96	2019–20	2. Bundesliga	28	15	1	0	—		—		29	15
Hannover 96	2020–21	2. Bundesliga	34	16	2	0	—		—		36	16
Hannover 96	2021–22	2. Bundesliga	4	1	1	2	—		—		5	3
Hannover 96	Total		66	32	4	2	—		—		70	34
Werder Bremen	2021–22	2. Bundesliga	29	20	0	0	—		—		29	20
Werder Bremen	2022–23	Bundesliga	34	12	1	0	—		—		35	12
Werder Bremen	2023–24	Bundesliga	33	12	1	1	—		—		34	13
Werder Bremen	2024–25	Bundesliga	32	8	4	1	—		—		36	9
Werder Bremen	Total		128	52	6	2	—		—		134	54
Birmingham City	2025–26	Championship	33	10	2	1	1	0	—		36	11
Birmingham City	2026–27	Championship	5	0	0	0	0	0	—		5	0
Birmingham City	Total		38	10	2	1	1	0	—		41	11
Career total			371	156	20	11	1	0	2	0	425	167

=== International ===
As of match played 21 November 2023

Appearances and goals by national team and year
National team	Year	Apps	Goals
Germany
Germany	2023	2	0
Total		2	0

== Honours ==
Germany U17

- UEFA European Under-17 Championship runner-up: 2011
- FIFA Under-17 World Cup third place: 2011

Individual

- 2. Bundesliga top scorer: 2017–18
