= Franck Evina =

Cameroonian footballer (born 2000)

Personal information
- Full name: Franck Junior Evina
- Date of birth: 5 July 2000 (age 26)
- Place of birth: Yaoundé, Cameroon
- Height: 1.80 m (5 ft 11 in)
- Positions: Forward; left winger

Team information
- Current team: Würzburger Kickers
- Number: 18

Youth career
- –2013: SV Neuperlach
- 2013–2017: Bayern Munich

Senior career*
Years	Team	Apps	(Gls)
2017–2020	Bayern Munich II	33	(6)
2018–2020	Bayern Munich	2	(0)
2019	→ Holstein Kiel (loan)	9	(0)
2019–2020	→ KFC Uerdingen (loan)	14	(4)
2020–2022	Hannover 96	2	(0)
2021	→ Hannover 96 II	5	(0)
2022	→ Viktoria Berlin (loan)	8	(0)
2022	→ Hannover 96 II	18	(12)
2023–2024	SV Sandhausen	34	(5)
2024–2026	Emmen	44	(11)
2026–	Würzburger Kickers	0	(0)

International career^{‡}
2017	Germany U18	1	(0)
2019	Cameroon U23	3	(2)
2020	Cameroon	1	(0)
- * Club domestic league appearances and goals as of 28 April 2026 ‡ National team caps and goals as of 9 October 2020

Franck Junior Evina (born 5 July 2000) is a Cameroonian footballer who plays as a forward for German 3. Liga club Würzburger Kickers. He represented Germany internationally on junior level before switching his allegiance to Cameroon.

== Club career ==
In the 2017–18 season, Evina joined the squad of Bayern Munich II, making his debut in the Regionalliga Bayern on 4 August 2017 in a 2–1 home win against 1. FC Schweinfurt, starting the match before being substituted off in the 79th minute for Mario Crnički.

Evina made his Bundesliga debut for the first team on 28 April 2018 in a 4–1 home win against Eintracht Frankfurt, starting the match before being substituted off in the 66th minute for Niklas Süle. On 11 May 2018, Evina signed a professional contract with Bayern, lasting three years until 30 June 2021.

In January 2019, Evina joined 2. Bundesliga side Holstein Kiel on a 1.5-year loan. After limited with playing time in the 2018–19 season, the loan deal was terminated and he was instead sent out on loan at KFC Uerdingen for the 2019–20 season. He left the club and joined 2. Bundesliga side Hannover 96 on 21 July 2020 for an undisclosed fee. He was loaned out to Viktoria Berlin for the second half of the 2021–22 season. Ahead of the 2022–23 season, Evina was demoted to the reserve team's squad.

On 8 December 2022, Evina signed with 2. Bundesliga club SV Sandhausen.

On 16 July 2024, Evina moved to Emmen in the Netherlands on a two-year deal.

== International career ==
Evina was eligible to represent Germany or the country of his birth, Cameroon, at international level. He played for Germany's U18 on 12 November 2017 against Italy. In November 2018, he decided to play for Cameroon.

Evina made his debut with the senior Cameroon national team in a friendly 0–0 tie with Japan on 9 October 2020.

== Career statistics ==
=== Club ===
As of 3 April 2024

Appearances and goals by club, season and competition
Club	Season	League			Cup		Other		Total	
Club	Season	Division	Apps	Goals	Apps	Goals	Apps	Goals	Apps	Goals
Bayern Munich II	2017–18	Regionalliga Bayern	17	3	—		—		17	3
Bayern Munich II	2018–19	Regionalliga Bayern	16	3	—		—		16	3
Bayern Munich II	Total		33	6	0	0	0	0	33	6
Bayern Munich	2017–18	Bundesliga	2	0	0	0	0	0	2	0
Holstein Kiel (loan)	2018–19	2. Bundesliga	9	0	0	0	—		9	0
KFC Uerdingen (loan)	2019–20	3. Liga	14	4	0	0	—		14	4
Hannover 96	2020–21	2. Bundesliga	2	0	1	0	—		3	0
Hannover 96	2021–22	2. Bundesliga	0	0	0	0	—		0	0
Hannover 96	Total		2	0	1	0	0	0	3	0
Hannover 96 II	2021–22	Regionalliga Nord	5	0	—		—		5	0
Hannover 96 II	2022–23	Regionalliga Nord	18	12	—		—		18	12
Hannover 96 II	Total		23	12	0	0	0	0	23	12
Viktoria Berlin (loan)	2021–22	3. Liga	8	0	—		—		0	0
Sandhausen	2022–23	2. Bundesliga	13	3	0	0	—		13	3
Sandhausen	2023–24	3. Liga	19	2	2	0	—		21	2
Sandhausen	Total		32	5	2	0	0	0	34	5
Career total			115	27	3	0	0	0	118	27
