= Martin Hansen (footballer) =

Danish footballer (born 1990)

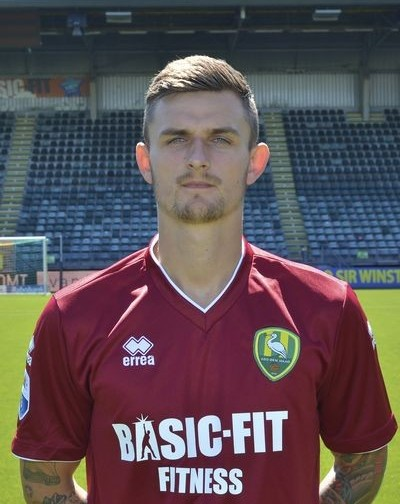
- Hansen in 2015

Personal information
- Date of birth: 15 June 1990 (age 36)
- Place of birth: Glostrup, Denmark
- Position: Goalkeeper

Team information
- Current team: OB
- Number: 1

Youth career
- 2005–2006: Brøndby
- 2006–2010: Liverpool

Senior career*
Years	Team	Apps	(Gls)
2010–2012	Liverpool	0	(0)
2011	→ Bradford City (loan)	4	(0)
2012–2013	Viborg	43	(0)
2013–2014	Nordsjælland	15	(0)
2014–2016	ADO Den Haag	65	(1)
2016–2018	FC Ingolstadt	26	(0)
2017–2018	→ SC Heerenveen (loan)	23	(0)
2018–2019	Basel	9	(0)
2019	Strømsgodset	13	(0)
2020–2022	Hannover 96	14	(0)
2022–	OB	49	(0)

International career
2006	Denmark U16	1	(0)
2006–2007	Denmark U17	2	(0)
2008	Denmark U18	3	(0)
2008–2009	Denmark U19	11	(0)
2009	Denmark U21	1	(0)
- * Club domestic league appearances and goals as of 7 October 2025

Martin Hansen (born 15 June 1990) is a Danish professional footballer who plays as a goalkeeper for OB.

== Career ==
=== Liverpool ===
Hansen moved from Brøndby to Liverpool in 2006, where he made his Liverpool Academy debut against Chelsea's academy, in a 2–0 win on 16 January 2007. Hansen was the member of the Liverpool Under 18s who won the FA Youth Cup in 2007, even though he missed the second leg of the FA Youth Cup Final with a broken finger.

Following this, Hansen was promoted to the reserve. Hansen signed his first professional with the club in July 2007, signing a two-year deal.

After spending a number of years in Liverpool's reserves, Hansen signed a one-month loan contract with Bradford City on 27 July 2011. He made his senior debut on 6 August 2011. On 21 August, it was announced that Hansen would return to Liverpool at the end of the month-long deal, after the two clubs failed to agree to an extension. During that time he played in all 4 of Bradford City's league games.

=== Career in Denmark ===
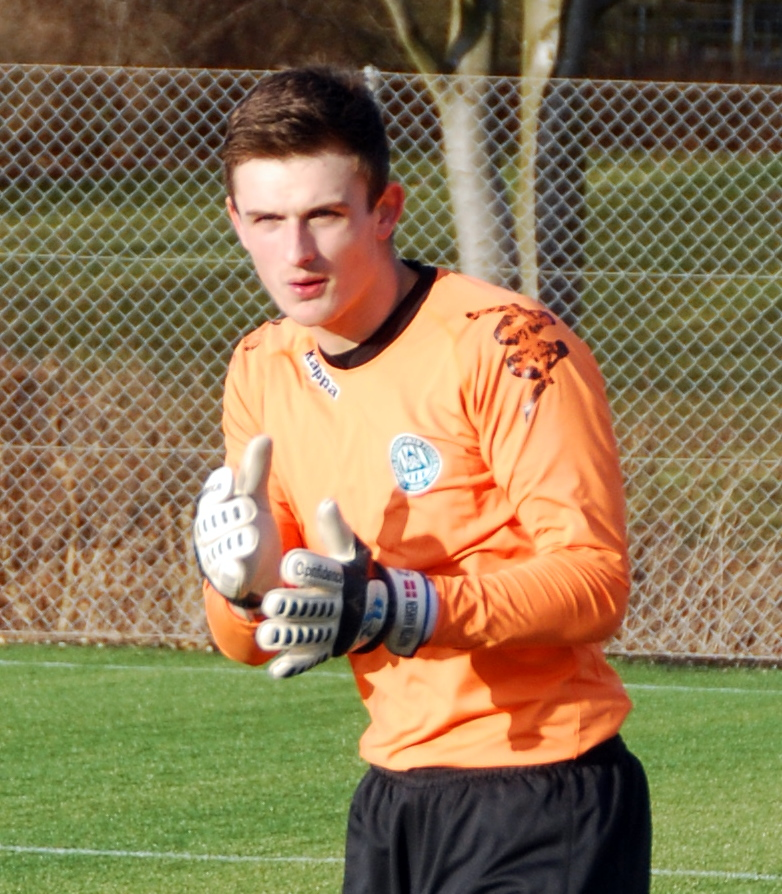
Hansen in March 2012.

Hansen moved back to Denmark on 31 January 2012, signing for Viborg FF. It took until on 5 April 2012 for Hansen to make his Viborg FF debut, in a 2–2 draw against Akademisk BK. Hansen's brilliant display in recent games led Manager Søren Frederiksen commenting on his performance that he's one of the best goalkeeper to play in the Danish 1st Division. Even opposition managers praised Hansen's performance. In the second half of the season, Hansen made eleven appearances for the club. His full second season at Viborg FF saw him make 32 out of 33 appearances and helping the club get promoted to the top division despite suffering a back injury in the winter. It was announced in late-December 2012 that Hansen intended not to renew his contract at Viborg FF.

Despite linked with a move to France it was announced in May 2013, it was confirmed that he would join FC Nordsjælland on a three-year contract, keeping him until 2016. After being on the bench in the opening game of the season, Hansen made his Nordsjælland debut on 26 July 2013, in a 1–1 draw against his former club, Viborg FF. Hansen also played in the Champions League qualification against Zenit Saint Petersburg but they proved to be too strong and failed to win either legs losing 1–0 and 5–0 respectively. During the season, Hansen find himself fight over a first choice goalkeeper with Jesper Hansen (who later left for Evian Thonon Gaillard), Jannich Storch, Thomas Villadsen and David Jensen. Following this, Manager Kasper Hjulmand reassured that Hansen shall be the club's first choice goalkeeper. Hansen continued to be the first choice goalkeeper for the club by the end of the first half of the season, but was dropped in favour of Jensen, who was used for the rest of the season. Hansen went on to make fifteen appearances for the club in his first season. Hansen caused controversy after calling the club's personal trainer Mathias Zangenberg a 'monkey', for which he later apologised.

After one season, the club's chairman announced his intention to sell Hansen.

=== ADO Den Haag ===
In early June, Hansen was linked with a move abroad, most likely in Netherlands. The club was looking for a new goalkeeper following Gino Coutinho's departure. On 11 July 2014, it was announced that Hansen had signed a two-year deal with Dutch Eredivisie side ADO Den Haag.

Hansen made his ADO Den Haag in the opening game of the season, in a 1–0 loss against Feyenoord. Hansen continued to be in the first choice goalkeeper by the first half of the season until he suffered a hand injury that saw him miss one match. After resuming his training, Hansen made his return to the first team on 17 January 2015, but after conceding two goals, which resulted a 2–2 draw, Hansen immediately left the stadium. He later explained his actions on his Twitter account. On 24 April 2015, against Vitesse Arnhem, Hansen provided an assist for Michiel Kramer, which turned out to be a winning goal. However, Hansen was dropped to the bench ahead of the match against Willem II after making remarks about the captain Roland Alberg. Hansen made his first team return in the last game of the season against PSV Eindhoven, which they lost 3–2. When the season ended, the club hoped to keep Hansen on a longer term.

On 11 August 2015, Hansen scored his first ever professional goal, to earn his team a last-minute draw against PSV. As a result, Hansen was named Voetbal International's Player of the Week. On 17 June 2016, he was awarded ADO Den Haag's Goal of the Season Award for the strike.

=== FC Ingolstadt ===
On 18 June 2016, Hansen joined Bundesliga side FC Ingolstadt 04 on a four-year deal. He made his league debut by starting in a 2–0 home defeat by FC Augsburg on 5 November 2016.

=== Heerenveen ===
Hansen joined Dutch club Heerenveen on loan for the 2017–18 season.

=== Basel ===
On 17 July 2018 Hansen signed a two year for Swiss club FC Basel. He joined Basel's first team for their 2018–19 season, under head coach Raphaël Wicky and later Marcel Koller, as back-up goalkeeper to Swiss international Jonas Omlin. He played his debut for the team on 18 August in the Swiss Cup away game as Basel won 3–0 against amateur club FC Montlingen. He played his domestic league debut for his new club in the away game in the Letzigrund on 26 August as Basel played a 1–1 draw with Zürich.

He won the 2018–19 Swiss Cup. The contract was terminated on 21 June 2019. During his period with the club, Hansen played a total of 16 games for Basel. Nine of these games were in the Swiss Super League, two in the Swiss Cup and two were in the 2018–19 UEFA Europa League.

=== Strømsgodset ===
In August 2019 Hansen signed for Norwegian club Strømsgodset on a contract until the end of the season. The contract was not extended.

=== Hannover 96 ===
On 21 January 2020, Hansen signed for German club Hannover 96. In July 2022 he was demoted to the Hannover under-23 team.

=== OB ===
On 1 August 2022, it was confirmed that Hansen had returned to his homeland, as he had signed a two-year deal with Danish Superliga club OB.

== International career ==
Hansen has represented Denmark at youth international level.

== Career statistics ==
As of match played 1 August 2025

Appearances and goals by club, season and competition
Club	Season	League			National Cup		Europe		Other		Total	
Club	Season	Division	Apps	Goals	Apps	Goals	Apps	Goals	Apps	Goals	Apps	Goals
Liverpool	2011–12	Premier League	0	0	0	0	—		0	0	0	0
Bradford City (loan)	2011–12	League Two	4	0	0	0	—		0	0	4	0
Viborg	2012–13	Danish 1st Division	32	0	0	0	—		0	0	32	0
Nordsjælland	2013–14	Danish Superliga	15	0	2	0	4 (Note: Two appearances in UEFA Champions League, two appearances in UEFA Europa League)	0	0	0	21	0
Den Haag	2014–15	Eredivisie	32	0	0	0	—		0	0	32	0
Den Haag	2015–16	Eredivisie	33	1	0	0	—		0	0	33	1
Den Haag	Total		65	1	0	0	0	0	0	0	65	1
FC Ingolstadt	2016–17	Bundesliga	23	0	1	0	—		0	0	24	0
FC Ingolstadt	2017–18	2. Bundesliga	1	0	0	0	—		0	0	1	0
FC Ingolstadt	Total		24	0	1	0	0	0	0	0	25	0
SC Heerenveen (loan)	2017–18	Eredivisie	25	0	1	0	—		0	0	26	0
Basel	2018–19	Swiss Super League	9	0	1	0	2 (Note: Appearances in UEFA Europa League)	0	0	0	12	0
Strømsgodset	2019	Eliteserien	13	0	0	0	—		0	0	13	0
Hannover 96	2019–20	2. Bundesliga	1	0	0	0	—		0	0	1	0
Hannover 96	2020–21	2. Bundesliga	2	0	0	0	—		0	0	2	0
Hannover 96	2021–22	2. Bundesliga	11	0	2	0	—		0	0	13	0
Hannover 96	Total		14	0	2	0	0	0	0	0	16	0
OB	2022–23	Danish Superliga	25	0	1	0	—		—		26	0
OB	2023–24	Danish Superliga	10	0	1	0	—		—		11	0
OB	2024–25	Danish 1st Division	11	0	0	0	—		—		11	0
OB	2025–26	Danish Superliga	3	0	0	0	—		—		3	0
OB	Total		49	0	2	0	0	0	0	0	51	0
Career total			250	1	9	0	4	0	0	0	263	1

== Honours ==
OB

- Danish 1st Division: 2024–25
