= Simon Falette =

Footballer (born 1992)

Personal information
- Full name: Simon Augustin Falette
- Date of birth: 19 February 1992 (age 34)
- Place of birth: Le Mans, France
- Height: 1.85 m (6 ft 1 in)
- Position: Centre back

Team information
- Current team: Al-Batin
- Number: 3

Youth career
- –2007: Tours
- 2012–2012: Lorient

Senior career*
Years	Team	Apps	(Gls)
2010–2012	Lorient B	41	(1)
2011–2014	Lorient	1	(0)
2012–2013	→ Laval (loan)	29	(2)
2013–2014	→ Brest (loan)	32	(1)
2014–2016	Brest	66	(2)
2016–2017	Metz	36	(3)
2017–2020	Eintracht Frankfurt	35	(1)
2020	→ Fenerbahçe (loan)	8	(0)
2020–2021	Hannover 96	20	(0)
2021–2023	Hatayspor	19	(1)
2024	Zbrojovka Brno	3	(0)
2024–2025	Martigues	33	(0)
2025–	Al-Batin	0	(0)

International career^{‡}
2018–	Guinea	16	(0)
- * Club domestic league appearances and goals as of 13 May 2025 ‡ National team caps and goals as of 5 February 2023

Simon Augustin Falette (born 19 February 1992) is a professional footballer who plays as a centre back for Saudi club Al-Batin. Born in France, he plays for the Guinea national team.

== Club career ==
Falette started playing football at Tours before moving to the youth teams of Lorient in 2007. On 18 February 2012, he made his Ligue 1 debut for the first team of Lorient in a 0–1 loss against Lille. He spent the 2012–13 season on loan at Ligue 2 side Laval. In the following season, he was again loaned out to Ligue 2, this time to Brest. Brest made the transfer permanent in the summer of 2014. Falette moved to first division team Metz prior to the 2016–17 season, where he was a regular starter and made 35 appearances in league matches, scoring three goals.

In August 2017, Falette moved to Bundesliga club Frankfurt on a four-year deal. He made his first appearance for his new club on the first matchday of the 2017–18 season in a 0–0 draw against Freiburg. On 10 February 2018, he scored his first and only goal in the German first league in a 4–2 victory against 1. FC Köln. On 19 May 2018, Falette won the 2017–18 DFB-Pokal with his team, but didn't play in the final.

On 5 October 2020, Falette joined Hannover 96. He joined Hatayspor in 2021.

On 27 February 2024, Falette signed a contract with Czech club Zbrojovka Brno until end of the season.

On 10 September 2025, Falette joined Saudi FDL club Al-Batin.

== International career ==
Falette was born in Le Mans, France, to a French Guianan father, Albert, who was also a footballer, and a Guinean Loma mother. He was called up to the French Guiana national football team in 2015.

In October 2018, he was approached by the Guinea national team, on the basis that his grandmother was born there. He made his debut for Guinea on 18 November 2018, in an Africa Cup of Nations qualifier against Ivory Coast. In the 2019 Africa Cup of Nations, he appeared as a starter in all four matches his team played in the tournament before dropping our after losing to Algeria in the round of 16.

== Career statistics ==
=== Club ===
As of match played 5 October 2020

Appearances and goals by club, season and competition
Club	Season	League			Domestic Cup		League Cup		Other		Total	
Club	Season	Division	Apps	Goals	Apps	Goals	Apps	Goals	Apps	Goals	Apps	Goals
Lorient II	2010–11	CFA	15	1	—		—		—		15	1
Lorient II	2011–12	CFA	26	0	—		—		—		26	0
Lorient II	Total		41	1	—		—		0	0	41	1
Lorient	2011–12	Ligue 1	1	0	0	0	0	0	—		1	0
Laval (loan)	2012–13	Ligue 2	29	2	1	1	1	0	—		31	3
Brest (loan)	2013–14	Ligue 2	32	1	2	0	0	0	—		34	1
Brest	2014–15	Ligue 2	32	1	4	0	1	0	—		37	1
Brest	2015–16	Ligue 2	34	1	1	0	0	0	—		35	1
Brest	Total		66	2	5	0	1	0	0	0	72	2
Metz	2016–17	Ligue 1	35	3	1	0	3	0	—		39	3
Metz	2017–18	Ligue 1	1	0	0	0	0	0	—		1	0
Metz	Total		36	3	1	0	3	0	0	0	40	3
Eintracht Frankfurt	2017–18	Bundesliga	27	1	1	0	—		—		28	1
Eintracht Frankfurt	2018–19	Bundesliga	7	0	0	0	7	0	—		14	0
Eintracht Frankfurt	2019–20	Bundesliga	1	0	0	0	0	0	—		1	0
Eintracht Frankfurt	Total		35	1	1	0	7	0	0	0	43	1
Fenerbahçe	2019–20	Süper Lig	8	0	4	0	—		—		12	0
Hannover 96	2020–21	2. Bundesliga	18	0	1	0	—		—		19	0
Hannover 96	2021–22	2. Bundesliga	2	0	0	0	–		–		2	0
Hannover 96	Total		20	0	1	0	0	0	0	0	21	0
Hatayspor	2021–22	Süper Lig	11	1	3	0	–		–		14	1
Hatayspor	2022–23	Süper Lig	8	0	1	0	–		–		9	0
Hatayspor	Total		19	1	4	0	0	0	0	0	23	1
Career total			268	10	15	1	12	0	0	0	295	11

=== International ===
As of matches played on 14 July 2019

Guinea national team
Year	Apps	Goals
2018	1	0
2019	7	0
Total	8	0
