= Valmir Sulejmani =

German-born Kosovan footballer (born 1996)

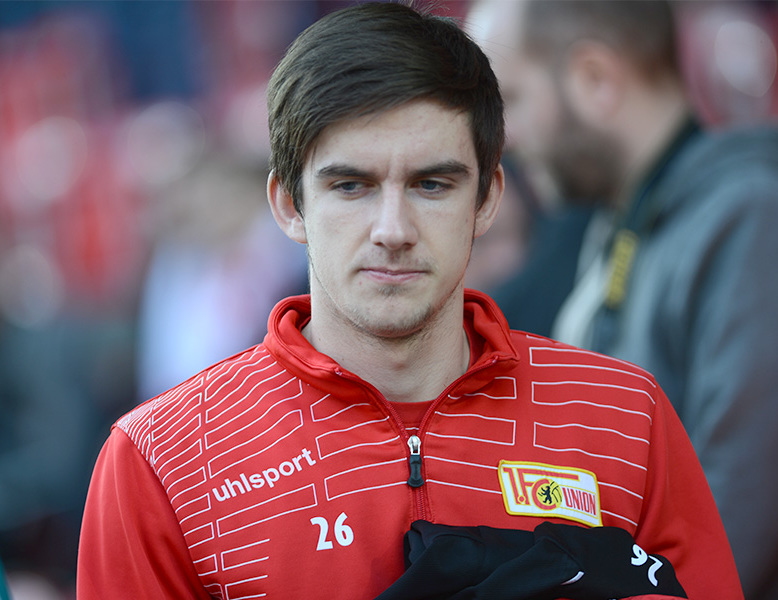
- Sulejmani with Union Berlin in 2015

Personal information
- Full name: Valmir Bajram Sulejmani
- Date of birth: 1 February 1996 (age 30)
- Place of birth: Großburgwedel, Germany
- Height: 1.85 m (6 ft 1 in)
- Position: Forward

Team information
- Current team: Alemannia Aachen
- Number: 38

Youth career
- 2001–2005: SC Wedemark
- 2005–2013: Hannover 96

Senior career*
Years	Team	Apps	(Gls)
2013–2018	Hannover 96 II	90	(13)
2014–2016	Hannover 96	11	(0)
2015	→ Union Berlin (loan)	6	(0)
2018–2020	Waldhof Mannheim	50	(24)
2020–2022	Hannover 96	33	(3)
2022–2023	Ingolstadt 04	27	(3)
2023–2024	1860 Munich	13	(0)
2025	Hannover 96 II	14	(5)
2025–	Alemannia Aachen	12	(0)

International career^{‡}
2012–2013	Germany U17	5	(0)
2017–2018	Kosovo U21	4	(0)
2015–	Kosovo	5	(0)
- * Club domestic league appearances and goals as of 28 May 2026 ‡ National team caps and goals as of 1 June 2021

Valmir Bajram Sulejmani (born 1 February 1996) is a professional footballer who plays as a forward for 3. Liga club Alemannia Aachen. Born in Germany, he plays for the Kosovo national team at international level.

== Club career ==
=== Hannover 96 ===
==== Youth career ====
Sulejmani started his youth career at Hannover 96's academy at age nine. During the 2012–13 season he played for Hannover U-19 youth team in the Under 19 Bundesliga making seven appearances and scoring one goal in 5–2 win against Holstein Kiel U-19 team on 12 May 2013. He started the 2013–14 season on 11 August 2013, playing against Rot-Weiss Erfurt U-19 in the loss 3–1. He managed to score two goals that season: the first came a week after the season's opening match, on 18 August 2013 in 4–2 win against St. Pauli U-19 the second on 1 September 2013 in a 4–1 win against Hamburger SV U-19. Sulejmani finished playing the 2013–14 season with total of six appearances and two goals scored and made his debut with Hannover 96 II on 19 October 2013 against Victoria Hamburg playing as a starter in a 2–0 away victory.

==== First team ====
Sulejmani played on 26 October 2013 in the 9–2 defeat by Hannover 96 II of Werder Bremen II before he was called up to Hannover 96's first team for the match against Werder Bremen on 3 November 2013, where he was an unused substitute. He made his debut for Hannover 96 at age 17, on 14 December 2013, in the match against Nürnberg, replacing Artur Sobiech in the 74th minute. Hannover came back from 3–0 down to draw 3–3, with Sulejmani assisting on Hannover's second goal scored by Mame Diouf in 87th minute. In the next fixture against SC Freiburg on 21 December 2013, Sulejmani was included in the starting line up, playing the first half of the match before being substituted off for Artur Sobiech, as the match finished in a 2–1 loss.

===== Loan to Union Berlin =====
On 29 January 2015, Sulejmani was loaned to the 2. Bundesliga side Union Berlin until the end of the 2014–15 season as a replacement for long injured Maximilian Thiel, rejoining head coach Norbert Düwel, who had previously been assistant coach at Hannover 96.

=== 1860 Munich ===
On 17 July 2023, Sulejmani joined 1860 Munich in 3. Liga. He started the 2023–24 season with a goal against 1. FC Stockheim in the Bavarian Cup. His contract with the team ended on 30 June 2024.

=== Hannover 96 II ===
On 1 February 2025, Sulejmani returned to Hannover 96, joining the reserve team's squad after having trained with them in late 2024.

== International ==
=== Germany ===
==== Under-17 ====
Between 2012 and 2013, Sulejmani has played five matches for the Germany U17.

=== Albania ===
==== Under-21 ====
Sulejmani revealed to the Albanian sports media that he had been in contact with FSHF and was available for selection by the Albania, given his Albanian background, despite having played for Germany at the youth level. On the other hand, Albania's coach, Gianni de Biasi, declared that Sulejmani is in his plans.

On 1 August 2014, the Albania national under-21 football team's coach Skënder Gega declared that he has invited Sulejmani to join the Albania national U21 team for the friendly match on 6 August 2014 against Qatar U-20. Two days later, on 3 August 2014, the media reported that his club Hannover 96 had not given him permission to play for the Albania U-21, but Sulejmani himself declared that he would be part of the team in future matches. On 1 October 2014, Sulejmani received another call-up from Albania under-21 for the friendly match against Romania U21, but declined the invitation.

=== Kosovo ===
==== Senior ====
On 7 October 2015, Sulejmani received a call-up from Kosovo for a friendly match against Equatorial Guinea coming on as a substitute in the 57th minute for Mërgim Brahimi.

==== Under-21 ====
On 5 June 2017, Sulejmani received his first call-up from the Kosovo U21 team when he was named to the starting line-up for a 2019 UEFA European Under-21 Championship qualification match against the Norwegian U21 team.

== Career statistics ==
=== Club ===
As of 1 February 2025

Appearances and goals by club, season and competition
Club	Season	League			Cup		Other		Total	
Club	Season	Division	Apps	Goals	Apps	Goals	Apps	Goals	Apps	Goals
Hannover 96 II	2013–14	Regionalliga Nord	10	0	0	0	—		10	0
Hannover 96 II	2014–15	Regionalliga Nord	16	0	0	0	—		16	0
Hannover 96 II	2015–16	Regionalliga Nord	23	4	0	0	—		23	4
Hannover 96 II	2016–17	Regionalliga Nord	28	4	0	0	—		28	4
Hannover 96 II	2017–18	Regionalliga Nord	13	5	0	0	—		13	5
Hannover 96 II	Total		90	13	0	0	—		90	13
Hannover 96	2013–14	Bundesliga	6	0	0	0	—		6	0
Union Berlin (loan)	2014–15	2. Bundesliga	6	0	0	0	1 (Note: One appearance with Union Berlin II)	0	7	0
Hannover 96	2015–16	Bundesliga	4	0	0	0	—		4	0
Hannover 96	2016–17	2. Bundesliga	1	0	0	0	—		1	0
Hannover 96	Total		5	0	0	0	—		18	0
Waldhof Mannheim	2018–19	Regionalliga Südwest	32	18	0	0	—		32	18
Waldhof Mannheim	2019–20	3. Liga	18	6	1	2	—		19	8
Waldhof Mannheim	Total		50	24	1	2	—		51	26
Hannover 96	2020–21	2. Bundesliga	29	3	2	0	—		31	3
Hannover 96	2021–22	2. Bundesliga	4	0	1	0	1 (Note: One appearance with Hannover 96 II)	0	6	0
Hannover 96	Total		33	3	3	0	1	0	37	3
FC Ingolstadt	2021–22	2. Bundesliga	14	2	0	0	—		14	2
FC Ingolstadt	2022–23	3. Liga	13	1	1	0	2 (Note: Appearances in the Bavarian Cup)	1	16	2
FC Ingolstadt	Total		27	3	1	0	2	1	30	4
1860 Munich	2023–24	3. Liga	13	0	0	0	4	3	17	3
Hannover 96 II	2024–25	3. Liga	0	0	0	0	—		0	0
Career total			230	43	5	2	8	4	243	49

=== International ===
As of 1 June 2021

Appearances and goals by national team and year
National team	Year	Apps	Goals
Kosovo
Kosovo	2015	2	0
Kosovo	2016	2	0
Kosovo	2021	1	0
Total		5	0
