= Simon Stehle =

Spanish-German footballer

Personal information
- Full name: Simon Fabio Stehle
- Date of birth: 17 September 2001 (age 25)
- Place of birth: Valladolid, Spain
- Height: 1.80 m (5 ft 11 in)
- Position: Winger

Team information
- Current team: Wehen Wiesbaden
- Number: 9

Youth career
- Atlético Madrid
- –2017: Levante
- 2017–2020: Hannover 96

Senior career*
Years	Team	Apps	(Gls)
2019–2020	Hannover 96 II	3	(1)
2020–2023	Hannover 96	5	(1)
2021–2022	→ 1. FC Kaiserslautern (loan)	6	(0)
2021	→ 1. FC Kaiserslautern II (loan)	3	(1)
2022–2023	→ Viktoria Köln (loan)	28	(4)
2023–2025	1. FC Saarbrücken	61	(7)
2025–	Wehen Wiesbaden	3	(0)
- * Club domestic league appearances and goals as of 29 May 2026

Simon Fabio Stehle (born 17 September 2001) is a German professional footballer with Colombian roots who plays as a winger for German 3. Liga club Wehen Wiesbaden.

== Club career ==
Stehle was born to a German father and Colombian mother.

Stehle joined the youth division of Hannover 96 in 2017 after playing for the youth teams of Spanish clubs Atlético Madrid and Levante. He made his 2. Bundesliga debut on 9 February 2020 against Greuther Fürth. He substituted Cedric Teuchert in the 79th minute and marked the 3–1 final score in injury time.

On 7 August 2023, Stehle signed with 1. FC Saarbrücken in 3. Liga.

On 11 June 2025, Stehle moved to Wehen Wiesbaden on a two-season contract.

== Career statistics ==
As of 2 August 2021

Appearances and goals by club, season and competition
Club	Season	League			Cup		Total		Ref.
Club	Season	League	Apps	Goals	Apps	Goals	Apps	Goals	Ref.
Hannover 96 II	2019–20	Regionalliga Nord	1	0	—		1	0	
Hannover 96 II	2020–21	Regionalliga Nord	2	1	—		2	1	
Hannover 96 II	Total		3	1	—		3	1	—
Hannover 96	2019–20	2. Bundesliga	2	1	0	0	2	1	
Hannover 96	2020–21	2. Bundesliga	3	0	0	0	3	0	
Hannover 96	Total		5	1	0	0	5	1	—
1. FC Kaiserslautern (loan)	2021–22	3. Liga	0	0	0	0	0	0	
Career total			8	2	0	0	8	2	—
