= Sebastian Kerk =

German footballer (born 1994)

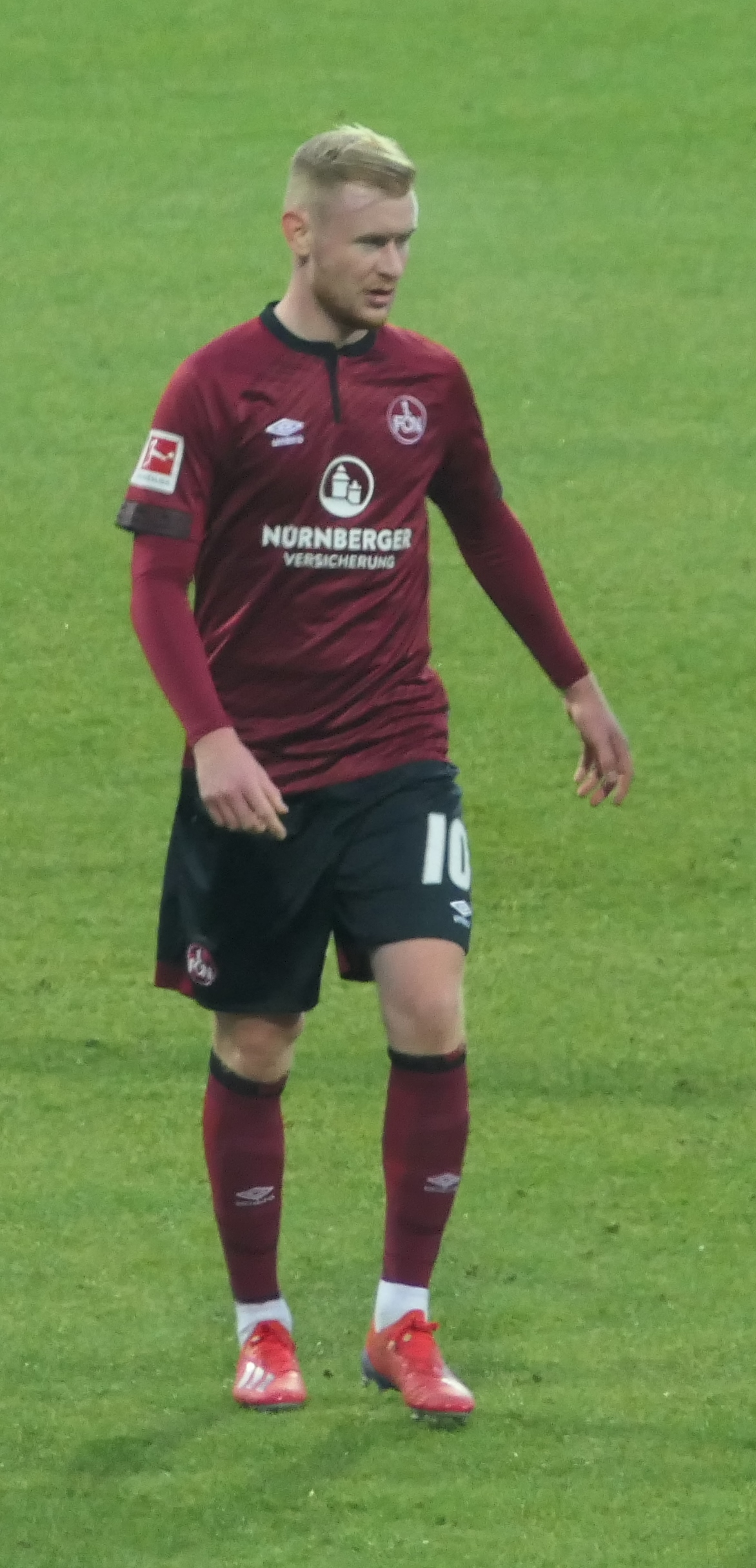
- Kerk with 1. FC Nürnberg in 2019

Personal information
- Date of birth: 17 April 1994 (age 32)
- Place of birth: Bad Wurzach, Germany
- Height: 1.82 m (6 ft 0 in)
- Position: Attacking midfielder

Team information
- Current team: Zagłębie Lubin
- Number: 37

Youth career
- 1999–2005: TSG Bad Wurzach
- 2005–2008: FV Ravensburg
- 2008–2012: SC Freiburg

Senior career*
Years	Team	Apps	(Gls)
2012–2013	SC Freiburg II	25	(11)
2013–2017	SC Freiburg	29	(1)
2015–2016	→ 1. FC Nürnberg (loan)	30	(6)
2016–2017	→ 1. FC Kaiserslautern (loan)	19	(1)
2017–2020	1. FC Nürnberg	44	(1)
2020–2021	VfL Osnabrück	34	(10)
2021–2023	Hannover 96	46	(10)
2023–2025	Widzew Łódź	36	(1)
2025–2026	Arka Gdynia	33	(4)
2026–	Zagłębie Lubin	11	(2)

International career
2011–2012	Germany U18	7	(3)
2012–2013	Germany U19	11	(5)
2013–2014	Germany U20	11	(3)
- * Club domestic league appearances and goals as of 21:10, 25 October 2026 (UTC)

Sebastian Kerk (born 17 April 1994) is a German professional footballer who plays as an attacking midfielder for Ekstraklasa club Zagłębie Lubin.

== Career ==
Kerk began his football career in his hometown club, TSG Bad Wurzach, where he played until 2005. He moved to FV Ravensburg, where he spent three years. In 2008, he joined the youth setup of SC Freiburg.

He made his first team debut for SC Freiburg on 18 May 2013 against Schalke 04.

On 31 August 2016, Kerk joined 1. FC Kaiserslautern on a season-long loan.

Kerk joined 1. FC Nürnberg in June 2017, reportedly signing a three-year contract.

After spells with VfL Osnabrück and Hannover 96, on 23 August 2023 Kerk moved abroad for the first time in his career and signed a two-year contract with Polish Ekstraklasa club Widzew Łódź.

On 16 June 2025, Kerk moved to recently promoted Ekstraklasa club Arka Gdynia on a two-year deal.

Despite Arka's relegation to the I liga in 2026, Kerk remained in the Polish top-flight after signing a two-year contract with Zagłębie Lubin on 20 June 2026.
