= Moussa Doumbouya =

Guinean footballer

Personal information
- Date of birth: 12 December 1997 (age 28)
- Place of birth: Conakry, Guinea
- Height: 1.87 m (6 ft 2 in)
- Position: Centre-forward

Team information
- Current team: FSV Schöningen
- Number: 29

Senior career*
Years	Team	Apps	(Gls)
–2017	SC Wietzenbruch		
2018–2019	Eintracht Celle	11	(1)
2019–2022	Hannover 96 II	44	(24)
2021–2022	Hannover 96	10	(1)
2022–2023	FC Ingolstadt	31	(4)
2023–2025	Rot-Weiss Essen	38	(6)
2025	Sportfreunde Lotte	7	(0)
2026	SC Wiedenbrück	13	(2)
2026–	FSV Schöningen	10	(3)
- * Club domestic league appearances and goals as of 22 September 2026

Moussa Doumbouya (born 12 December 1997) is a Guinean professional footballer who plays as a centre-forward for German club FSV Schöningen.

== Career ==
Doumbouya made his professional debut for Hannover 96 in the 2. Bundesliga on 21 February 2021, coming on as a substitute in the 71st minute for Valmir Sulejmani against Fortuna Düsseldorf. The away match finished as a 3–2 loss for Hannover.

Following a season with FC Ingolstadt, Doumbouya signed for fellow 3. Liga club Rot-Weiss Essen in June 2023 on a two-year deal.

On 29 January 2026, Doumbouya joined SC Wiedenbrück.
