= Mick Gudra =

German footballer

Personal information
- Full name: Mick Gudra
- Date of birth: 1 January 2001 (age 25)
- Place of birth: Bonn, Germany
- Height: 1.80 m (5 ft 11 in)
- Position: Centre-forward

Team information
- Current team: VfV Hildesheim
- Number: 8

Youth career
- 2006–2009: TuS Germania Hersel
- 2009–2010: Fortuna Köln
- 2010–2012: 1. Jugend-Fußball-Schule Köln
- 2012–2015: Fortuna Düsseldorf
- 2015–2019: Schalke 04
- 2019–2020: Hannover 96

Senior career*
Years	Team	Apps	(Gls)
2019–2022	Hannover 96 II	2	(0)
2020–2022	Hannover 96	4	(1)
2022–2024	TSV Steinbach Haiger	54	(6)
2024–2025	TSV Havelse	24	(1)
2025–	VfV Hildesheim	24	(6)

International career^{‡}
2016	Germany U15	2	(0)
2019	Germany U18	1	(0)
2019	Germany U19	3	(0)
- * Club domestic league appearances and goals as of 1 July 2026 ‡ National team caps and goals as of 14:44, 12 December 2020 (UTC)

Mick Gudra (born 1 January 2001) is a German footballer who plays as a centre-forward for VfV Hildesheim.

== Career ==
Gudra made his professional debut for Hannover 96 in the 2. Bundesliga on 12 December 2020, coming on as a substitute in the 85th minute for Hendrik Weydandt against 1. FC Heidenheim. The away match finished as a 1–0 loss for Hannover.
