= Marc Lamti =

German-Tunisian footballer

Personal information
- Full name: Marc Martin Lamti
- Date of birth: 28 January 2001 (age 25)
- Place of birth: Cologne, Germany
- Height: 1.96 m (6 ft 5 in)
- Positions: Defender; midfielder

Youth career
- 2005–2008: FC Pesch
- 2008–2020: Bayer Leverkusen

Senior career*
Years	Team	Apps	(Gls)
2020–2022	Hannover 96 II	4	(0)
2021–2022	Hannover 96	1	(0)

International career^{‡}
2021–	Tunisia U20	5	(1)
2019–	Tunisia	2	(0)
- * Club domestic league appearances and goals as of 15:15, 13 August 2021 (UTC) ‡ National team caps and goals as of 14:05, 4 July 2021 (UTC)

Marc Martin Lamti (born 28 January 2001) is a footballer who plays as a defender. Born in Germany, he represents Tunisia national football team internationally.

== International career ==
Lamti made his debut for Tunisia national football team on 7 June 2019 in a friendly against Iraq, as an 81st-minute substitute for Ellyes Skhiri. He was later included in the squad for 2019 Africa Cup of Nations.

== Career statistics ==
=== International ===
As of matches played on 17 July 2019

Appearances and goals by national team and year
National team	Year	Apps	Goals
Tunisia	2019	2	0
Total		2	0

== Honours ==
Tunisia

- Africa Cup of Nations 4th place: 2019
