= Marlon Sündermann =

German footballer

Personal information
- Date of birth: 16 May 1998 (age 28)
- Place of birth: Kassel, Germany
- Height: 1.86 m (6 ft 1 in)
- Position: Goalkeeper

Team information
- Current team: Hessen Kassel
- Number: 34

Youth career
- RSV Göttingen 05
- –2013: JFV Göttingen
- 2013–2017: Hannover 96

Senior career*
Years	Team	Apps	(Gls)
2017–2022	Hannover 96 II	64	(0)
2020–2022	Hannover 96	1	(0)
2022–	Hessen Kassel	4	(0)
- * Club domestic league appearances and goals as of 13 November 2022

Marlon Sündermann (born 16 May 1998) is a German footballer who plays as a goalkeeper for Hessen Kassel.

== Career ==
Sündermann began his youth career at RSV Göttingen 05 and JFV Göttingen, before joining the academy of Hannover 96 in 2017. He made his professional debut for Hannover's first team in the 2. Bundesliga on 23 May 2021, coming on as a half-time substitute for Michael Ratajczak against 1. FC Nürnberg.

== Personal life ==
Sündermann was born in Kassel, and grew up in Göttingen.
