= Barış Başdaş =

Turkish footballer (born 1990)

Personal information
- Date of birth: 17 January 1990 (age 36)
- Place of birth: Cologne, West Germany
- Height: 1.88 m (6 ft 2 in)
- Position: Centre-back

Team information
- Current team: Sarıyer
- Number: 6

Youth career
- –2006: 1. FC Köln
- 2006–2009: Alemannia Aachen

Senior career*
Years	Team	Apps	(Gls)
2009–2015	Kasımpaşa	109	(2)
2015–2016	Göztepe	10	(0)
2016	→ Adana Demirspor (loan)	5	(1)
2016–2018	Karabükspor	42	(1)
2018–2019	Alanyaspor	11	(0)
2019	→ Gençlerbirliği (loan)	5	(0)
2019–2020	Fatih Karagümrük	23	(1)
2020–2021	Hannover 96	17	(0)
2021–2022	Samsunspor	6	(0)
2022–2023	Yeni Malatyaspor	21	(1)
2023–	Sarıyer	5	(0)

International career
2008	Turkey U18	2	(0)
2009–2012	Turkey U21	10	(1)
2012–	Turkey A2	1	(0)
- * Club domestic league appearances and goals as of 1 October 2023

Barış Başdaş (born 17 January 1990) is a Turkish professional footballer who plays as a centre-back for Sarıyer.

== Club career ==
Başdaş began his career with local club 1. FC Köln. He played in the youth teams of the club before transferring to Alemannia Aachen in 2006. Başdaş played a season with the under-17 squad, before being promoted to the U19 team. He was transferred to Kasımpaşa in 2009.

=== Kasımpaşa ===
On 6 October 2013, Başdaş scored his first Super league goal against Elazığspor. He received a cross from the Dutch international Ryan Donk from the left side and Baris finished it with a header. Since 2009, Baris had played 109 games with Kasımpaşa.

=== Göztepe ===
On 25 June 2015, Başdaş had signed with Göztepe for two years on a free transfer.

== Personal life ==
Başdaş was seriously injured in the 2023 Turkey–Syria earthquake.
