= Tim Walbrecht =

German footballer

Personal information
- Date of birth: 18 September 2001 (age 25)
- Place of birth: Celle, Germany
- Height: 1.86 m (6 ft 1 in)
- Positions: Defensive midfielder; centre-back

Team information
- Current team: Hannover 96 II
- Number: 33

Youth career
- JFC Allertal
- –2020: Hannover 96

Senior career*
| Years | Team | Apps | (Gls) |
| 2019–2023 | Hannover 96 II | 42 | (2) |
| 2019–2023 | Hannover 96 | 5 | (0) |
| 2020–2021 | → Wehen Wiesbaden (loan) | 11 | (0) |
| 2024– | Hannover 96 II | 49 | (3) |
- * Club domestic league appearances and goals as of 20 June 2026

Tim Walbrecht (born 18 September 2001) is a German footballer who plays as a defensive midfielder or centre-back for Hannover 96 II.
