= Philipp Ochs =

German footballer

Personal information
- Date of birth: 17 April 1997 (age 29)
- Place of birth: Wertheim am Main, Germany
- Height: 1.94 m (6 ft 4 in)
- Position: Winger

Team information
- Current team: Würzburger Kickers
- Number: 13

Youth career
- –2009: SV Viktoria Wertheim
- 2009–2015: 1899 Hoffenheim

Senior career*
Years	Team	Apps	(Gls)
2015–2017	1899 Hoffenheim II	37	(5)
2015–2020	1899 Hoffenheim	19	(0)
2018	→ VfL Bochum (loan)	5	(0)
2018–2019	→ AaB (loan)	20	(1)
2020–2022	Hannover 96	49	(3)
2022–2023	SV Sandhausen	19	(0)
2023–2025	First Vienna	53	(6)
2025–	Würzburger Kickers	27	(0)

International career
2011–2012	Germany U15	6	(4)
2012–2013	Germany U16	3	(3)
2013–2014	Germany U17	13	(4)
2014–2015	Germany U18	5	(1)
2015–2016	Germany U19	11	(6)
2016–2017	Germany U20	12	(5)
2017–2018	Germany U21	9	(3)
- * Club domestic league appearances and goals as of 28 June 2026

Philipp Ochs (German pronunciation: [ˈfiːlɪp ˈʔɔks]; born 17 April 1997) is a German professional footballer who plays as a winger for 3. Liga club Würzburger Kickers.

== Club career ==
Ochs joined TSG 1899 Hoffenheim's first team in 2015, coming from the U19 side. He made his Bundesliga debut on 15 August 2015 against Bayer Leverkusen replacing Eugen Polanski after 82 minutes in a 2–1 away defeat.

On 31 January 2020, Ochs joined Hannover 96 on deal lasting until 2022.

Ahead of the 2022–23 season, Ochs transferred to SV Sandhausen.

On 31 July 2023, Ochs signed a two-year contract with First Vienna in Austria.

== International career ==
Ochs is a youth international for Germany for every level from under 15 to under 21, scoring in every level. He is eligible to represent Kazakhstan internationally, as his parents came from Kazakhstan to Germany.

== Career statistics ==
As of match played 13 May 2018

Appearances and goals by club, season and competition
Club	Season	League			National cup		Europe		Total	
Club	Season	Division	Apps	Goals	Apps	Goals	Apps	Goals	Apps	Goals
1899 Hoffenheim II	2015–16	Regionalliga Südwest	9	1	—		—		9	1
1899 Hoffenheim II	2016–17	Regionalliga Südwest	16	2	—		—		16	2
1899 Hoffenheim II	2017–18	Regionalliga Südwest	2	2	—		—		2	2
1899 Hoffenheim II	Total		27	5	—		—		27	5
1899 Hoffenheim	2015–16	Bundesliga	13	0	0	0	—		13	0
1899 Hoffenheim	2016–17	Bundesliga	3	0	1	0	—		4	0
1899 Hoffenheim	2017–18	Bundesliga	3	0	1	0	5 (Note: Appearances in the Europa League)	1	9	1
1899 Hoffenheim	2018–19	Bundesliga	0	0	0	0	—		0	0
1899 Hoffenheim	Total		19	0	2	0	5	1	26	1
VfL Bochum (loan)	2017–18	2. Bundesliga	5	0	0	0	—		5	0
AaB (loan)	2018–19	Danish Superliga	1	1	0	0	—		1	1
Career total			62	6	2	0	5	1	69	7

== Honours ==
Individual

- Fritz Walter Medal U19 Silver: 2016
