= 2023–24 Hannover 96 season =

Hannover 96
2023–24 season
- President: Martin Kind
- Manager: Stefan Leitl
- Stadium: Heinz von Heiden Arena
- 2. Bundesliga: 6th
- DFB-Pokal: First round
- Top goalscorer: League: Cedric Teuchert (11); All: Cedric Teuchert (12)
- Highest home attendance: 49,000; Hannover v Hamburg; Hannover v Schalke; Hannover v St. Pauli; Hannover v Kiel
- Lowest home attendance: 25,100; Hannover v Nürnberg
- Average home league attendance: 38,259
- Biggest win: Hannover 7–0 Osnabrück
- Biggest defeat: Kiel 3–0 Hannover
| Home colours | Away colours |

The 2023–24 Hannover 96 season was the 128th season in the football club's history and 28th overall and fifth consecutive season in the second flight of German football, the 2. Bundesliga. Hannover 96 also participated in this season's edition of the domestic cup, the DFB-Pokal. This was the 65th season for Hannover in the Heinz von Heiden Arena, located in Hanover, Lower Saxony, Germany.

== Players ==
=== Squad information ===
As of 2 March 2024

Note: Flags indicate national team as defined under FIFA eligibility rules; some limited exceptions apply. Players may hold more than one non-FIFA nationality.

| No. | Pos. | Nation | Player |
|---|---|---|---|
| 1 | GK | GER | Ron-Robert Zieler (captain) |
| 4 | DF | GER | Bright Arrey-Mbi |
| 5 | DF | GER | Phil Neumann |
| 6 | MF | GER | Fabian Kunze |
| 8 | MF | GER | Enzo Leopold |
| 9 | FW | GER | Nicolò Tresoldi |
| 10 | MF | GER | Sebastian Ernst |
| 11 | MF | AUT | Louis Schaub |
| 13 | MF | GER | Max Christiansen |
| 16 | FW | NOR | Håvard Nielsen |
| 17 | MF | GER | Muhammed Damar (on loan from TSG Hoffenheim) |
| 20 | DF | GER | Jannik Dehm |
| 21 | DF | JPN | Sei Muroya |
| 23 | DF | GER | Marcel Halstenberg |

| No. | Pos. | Nation | Player |
|---|---|---|---|
| 24 | MF | CYP | Antonio Foti (on loan from Eintracht Frankfurt) |
| 25 | MF | GER | Lars Gindorf |
| 28 | MF | GER | Montell Ndikom |
| 29 | MF | SWE | Kolja Oudenne |
| 30 | GK | GER | Leo Weinkauf |
| 31 | DF | GER | Julian Börner |
| 32 | FW | GER | Andreas Voglsammer |
| 33 | GK | GER | Toni Stahl |
| 34 | DF | GER | Yannik Lührs |
| 35 | GK | GER | Leon-Oumar Wechsel |
| 36 | FW | GER | Cedric Teuchert |
| 37 | DF | GER | Brooklyn Ezeh |
| 40 | MF | GER | Christopher Scott (on loan from Antwerp) |

=== Out on loan ===
Note: Flags indicate national team as defined under FIFA eligibility rules; some limited exceptions apply. Players may hold more than one non-FIFA nationality.

| No. | Pos. | Nation | Player |
|---|---|---|---|
| 7 | MF | GER | Max Besuschkow (on loan to Austria Klagenfurt until 30 June 2024) |
| 38 | FW | GER | Thaddäus-Monju Momuluh (on loan to Arminia Bielefeld until 30 June 2024) |
| 39 | MF | GER | Marius Wörl (on loan to Arminia Bielefeld until 30 June 2024) |

=== Transfers ===
==== In ====
| No. | Pos | Player | From | Type | Window | Ends | Fee | Source |
|---|---|---|---|---|---|---|---|---|
| 4 | DF | (Germany) Bright Arrey-Mbi | (Germany) Bayern Munich | Transfer | Summer | 30 June 2025 | Free | |
| 13 | MF | (Germany) Max Christiansen | (Germany) Greuther Fürth | Transfer | Summer | 30 June 2025 | Free | |
| 17 | MF | (Germany) Muhammed Damar | (Germany) TSG Hoffenheim | Loan | Summer | 30 June 2024 | Free | |
| 23 | DF | (Germany) Marcel Halstenberg | (Germany) RB Leipzig | Transfer | Summer | 30 June 2025 | €700,000 | |
| 29 | MF | (Sweden) Kolja Oudenne | (Germany) VSG Altglienicke | Transfer | Summer | 30 June 2025 | Free | |
| 32 | FW | (Germany) Andreas Voglsammer | (England) Millwall | Transfer | Summer | 30 June 2025 | Free | |
| 35 | GK | (Germany) Leon-Oumar Wechsel | (Germany) SV Rödinghausen | Transfer | Summer | 30 June 2026 | Free | |
| 37 | DF | (Germany) Brooklyn Ezeh | (Germany) Wehen Wiesbaden | Transfer | Summer | 30 June 2026 | €800,000 | |
| 39 | MF | (Germany) Marius Wörl | (Germany) 1860 Munich | Transfer | Summer | 30 June 2026 | Free | |
| 40 | MF | (Germany) Christopher Scott | (Belgium) Antwerp | Loan | Summer | 30 June 2024 | Free | |
| – | FW | (Germany) Lawrence Ennali | (Germany) Rot-Weiss Essen | Return from loan | Summer | 30 June 2024 | – | |
| – | MF | (Germany) Simon Stehle | (Germany) Viktoria Köln | Return from loan | Summer | 30 June 2024 | – | |

==== Out ====
| No. | Pos | Player | To | Type | Window | Fee | Source |
|---|---|---|---|---|---|---|---|
| 3 | DF | (Germany) Ekin Çelebi | (Germany) Rot-Weiss Essen | Contract terminated | Summer | – | |
| 4 | DF | (Germany) Bright Arrey-Mbi | (Germany) Bayern Munich | End of loan | Summer | – | |
| 9 | FW | (Germany) Hendrik Weydandt | Retirement | End of contract | Summer | – | |
| 14 | FW | (Germany) Maximilian Beier | (Germany) TSG Hoffenheim | End of loan | Summer | – | |
| 22 | FW | (Germany) Sebastian Stolze | (Germany) SV Sandhausen | Transfer | Summer | Free | |
| 27 | MF | (Germany) Tim Walbrecht | Free agent | End of contract | Summer | – | |
| 32 | DF | (Slovenia) Luka Krajnc | (Italy) Catanzaro | Transfer | Summer | Free | |
| 37 | MF | (Germany) Sebastian Kerk | (Poland) Widzew Łódź | End of contract | Summer | – | |
| 39 | MF | (Germany) Marius Wörl | (Germany) Arminia Bielefeld | Loan | Summer | Free | |
| – | FW | (Germany) Lawrence Ennali | (Poland) Górnik Zabrze | Transfer | Summer | Free | |
| – | MF | (Germany) Simon Stehle | (Germany) 1. FC Saarbrücken | Contract terminated | Summer | – | |
| 7 | MF | (Germany) Max Besuschkow | Austria Klagenfurt | Loan | Winter | Free | |
| 18 | DF | (Germany) Derrick Köhn | (Turkey) Galatasaray | Transfer | Winter | €3,350,000 | |
| 38 | FW | (Germany) Thaddäus-Monju Momuluh | (Germany) Arminia Bielefeld | Loan | Winter | Free | |

== Friendly matches ==
Win Draw Loss

| 28 June 2023 Friendly | SV Ramlingen/Ehlershausen | 0–3 | Hannover 96 | Burgdorf |
| 18:30 CEST (UTC+2) | | Report | Tresoldi 9'; Leopold 29'; Foti 63' | Stadium: Wahrendorff-Arena; Attendance: 1,696 |

| 1 July 2023 Friendly | VfV Hildesheim | 0–4 | Hannover 96 | Hildesheim |
| 15:30 CEST (UTC+2) | | Report | Schaub 4', 19'; Teuchert 58', 68' | Stadium: Friedrich-Ebert-Stadion; Attendance: 1,730 |

| 7 July 2023 Friendly | Holstein Kiel | 1–2 | Hannover 96 | Kiel |
| 13:00 CEST (UTC+2) | Arp 88' | Report | Schaub 56'; Momuluh 95' | Stadium: Citti Fußball Park |
Note: The match lasted for 2×30 and 2×22.5 minutes.

| 12 July 2023 Friendly | Hannover 96 | 2–2 | SpVgg Unterhaching | Saalfelden, Austria |
| 16:00 CEST (UTC+2) | Tresoldi 97', 114' | Report | Fetsch 59'; Keller 93' | Stadium: Saalfelden Arena |
Note: The match lasted for 4×30 minutes.

| 16 July 2023 Friendly | Hannover 96 | 3–0 | Górnik Zabrze | St. Johann in Tirol, Austria |
| 14:00 CEST (UTC+2) | Paluszek 6' (o.g.); Nielsen 20', 45+1' | Report | | Stadium: Koasastadion |
Note: The match lasted for 1×45 minutes.

| 16 July 2023 Friendly | 1. FC Köln | 0–1 | Hannover 96 | St. Johann in Tirol, Austria |
| 15:00 CEST (UTC+2) | | Report | Teuchert 36' | Stadium: Koasastadion |
Note: The match lasted for 1×45 minutes.

| 19 July 2023 Friendly | Hannover 96 | 3–0 | MSV Duisburg | Hanover |
| 15:00 CEST (UTC+2) | Börner 19'; Teuchert 22'; Nielsen 51' | Report | | Stadium: Erika-Fisch-Stadion; Attendance: 0 |

| 22 July 2023 Friendly | Hannover 96 | 0–2 | Villarreal B | Hanover |
| 11:00 CEST (UTC+2) | | Report | García 15'; Geralnik 47' | Stadium: Erika-Fisch-Stadion; Attendance: 0 |

| 22 July 2023 Friendly | Hannover 96 | 3–0 | Villarreal | Hanover |
| 14:00 CEST (UTC+2) | Schaub 44', 66', 85' | Report | | Stadium: Heinz von Heiden Arena; Attendance: 11,000; Referee: Robert Schröder |

| 30 July 2023 Friendly | Hannover 96 | 7–0 | Hessen Kassel | Hanover |
| 14:00 CEST (UTC+2) | Leopold 26'; Kunze 30'; Foti 42', 45', 68'; Ernst 51', 58' | Report | | Stadium: Erika-Fisch-Stadion; Attendance: 0 |

| 7 September 2023 Friendly | Weser Uplands XI | 1–12 | Hannover 96 | Fürstenberg |
| 18:00 CEST (UTC+2) | Schmidt 46' | Report | Nielsen 10', 23' (pen.); Leopold 27'; Scott 38'; Ndikom 40'; Momuluh 69'; Voglsammer 71' (pen.), 78'; Meier 73', 80', 82'; Dehm 77' | Stadium: Waldstadion; Attendance: 1,750 |

| 8 September 2023 Friendly | Hannover 96 | 1–1 | Preußen Münster | Hanover |
| 12:30 CEST (UTC+2) | Momuluh 78' | Report | Deters 63' | Stadium: Erika-Fisch-Stadion; Attendance: 0 |

| 12 October 2023 Friendly | VfL Bochum | 1–3 | Hannover 96 | Bochum |
| 13:30 CEST (UTC+2) | Broschinski 75' | Report | Momuluh 50'; Voglsammer 60' (pen.), 77' | Stadium: Leichtathletikplatz am Vonovia Ruhrstadion; Referee: Tobias Severins |
Note: The match lasted for 4×30 minutes.

| 6 January 2024 Friendly | Ajax | 0–3 | Hannover 96 | Jerez de la Frontera, Spain |
| 16:00 CET (UTC+1) | | Report | Börner 4'; Nielsen 41'; Damar 45' | Stadium: Campo Hotel Barceló Montecastillo |
Note: The match lasted for 2×30 minutes.

| 7 January 2024 Friendly | Ajax | 2–1 | Hannover 96 | Arcos de la Frontera, Spain |
| 13:00 CET (UTC+1) | Brobbey 24'; Bergwijn 26' | Report | Damar 42' | Stadium: Estadio Antonio Gallardo |

| 9 January 2024 Friendly | Zürich | 0–4 | Hannover 96 | Jerez de la Frontera, Spain |
| 14:30 CET (UTC+1) | | Report | Ernst 12'; Oudenne 53', 69'; Leopold 56' | Stadium: Campo Hotel Barceló Montecastillo |

| 13 January 2024 Friendly | Hannover 96 | 3–2 | Holstein Kiel | Hanover |
| 13:00 CET (UTC+1) | Tresoldi 17'; Kunze 40'; Komenda 69' (o.g.) | Report | Machino 30'; Porath 75' | Stadium: Eilenriedestadion; Attendance: 0 |

| 17 February 2024 Friendly | Hannover 96 | 2–0 | Hessen Kassel | Hanover |
| 11:30 CET (UTC+1) | Ndikom 1'; Oudenne 70' | Report | | Stadium: Erika-Fisch-Stadion; Attendance: 0 |

| 21 March 2024 Friendly | Hannover 96 | 3–1 | Werder Bremen | Hanover |
| 13:00 CET (UTC+1) | Gindorf 42'; Damar 47'; Dehm 82' | Report | Imasuen 62' | Stadium: Heinz von Heiden Arena; Attendance: 0 |

== Competitions ==
Win Draw Loss

=== Overview ===
| Competition | First match | Last match | Starting round | Final position | Record | | | | | | | |
| Competition | First match | Last match | Starting round | Final position | Pld | W | D | L | GF | GA | GD | Win % |
|---|---|---|---|---|---|---|---|---|---|---|---|---|
| 2. Bundesliga | 29 July 2023 | 19 May 2024 | Matchday 1 | 6th | 34 | 13 | 13 | 8 | 59 | 44 | +15 | 38.24 |
| DFB-Pokal | 11 August 2023 | 11 August 2023 | First round | First round | 1 | 0 | 1 | 0 | 3 | 3 | +0 | 0.00 |
| Total | | | | | 35 | 13 | 14 | 8 | 62 | 47 | +15 | 37.14 |

Source: Competitions

=== 2. Bundesliga ===
==== League table ====
| Pos | Team | Pld | W | D | L | GF | GA | GD | Pts |
|---|---|---|---|---|---|---|---|---|---|
| 4 | Hamburger SV | 34 | 17 | 7 | 10 | 64 | 44 | +20 | 58 |
| 5 | Karlsruher SC | 34 | 15 | 10 | 9 | 68 | 48 | +20 | 55 |
| 6 | Hannover 96 | 34 | 13 | 13 | 8 | 59 | 44 | +15 | 52 |
| 7 | SC Paderborn | 34 | 15 | 7 | 12 | 54 | 54 | 0 | 52 |
| 8 | Greuther Fürth | 34 | 14 | 8 | 12 | 50 | 49 | +1 | 50 |

Source: DFB
Rules for classification: 1) Points; 2) Goal difference; 3) Goals scored; 4) Head-to-head results; 5) Head-to-head away goals scored; 6) Away goals scored; 7) Play-off.
(Rules 4–6 only apply after home and away matches have been played between the tied teams.)

==== Results summary ====
| Overall | | | | | | | | Home | | | | | | Away | | | | | |
| Pld | W | D | L | GF | GA | GD | Pts | W | D | L | GF | GA | GD | W | D | L | GF | GA | GD |
|---|---|---|---|---|---|---|---|---|---|---|---|---|---|---|---|---|---|---|---|
| 34 | 13 | 13 | 8 | 59 | 44 | +15 | 52 | 8 | 6 | 3 | 35 | 20 | +15 | 5 | 7 | 5 | 24 | 24 | 0 |

Source: DFB

==== Results by round ====
| Round | 1 | 2 | 3 | 4 | 5 | 6 | 7 | 8 | 9 | 10 | 11 | 12 | 13 | 14 | 15 | 16 | 17 | 18 | 19 | 20 | 21 | 22 | 23 | 24 | 25 | 26 | 27 | 28 | 29 | 30 | 31 | 32 | 33 | 34 |
|---|---|---|---|---|---|---|---|---|---|---|---|---|---|---|---|---|---|---|---|---|---|---|---|---|---|---|---|---|---|---|---|---|---|---|
| Ground | H | A | A | H | A | H | A | H | A | H | A | H | A | H | A | H | A | A | H | H | A | H | A | H | A | H | A | H | A | H | A | H | A | H |
| Result | D | D | W | L | W | W | D | W | L | W | L | W | D | D | L | D | L | D | W | W | W | W | L | D | D | D | W | D | D | L | D | W | W | L |
| Position | 8 | 11 | 6 | 11 | 7 | 4 | 5 | 3 | 5 | 4 | 5 | 3 | 4 | 7 | 7 | 6 | 8 | 9 | 6 | 6 | 5 | 4 | 5 | 4 | 5 | 5 | 5 | 5 | 5 | 6 | 6 | 6 | 6 | 6 |

Source: DFB
A = Away; H = Home; W = Win; D = Draw; L = Loss

==== Matches ====
| 29 July 2023 1 | Hannover 96 | 2–2 | SV Elversberg | Hanover |
| 13:00 CEST (UTC+2) | Teuchert 42' (pen.); Tresoldi 54' | Report | Correia 22'; Faghir 38' | Stadium: Heinz von Heiden Arena; Attendance: 29,200; Referee: Alexander Sather |

| 6 August 2023 2 | 1. FC Nürnberg | 2–2 | Hannover 96 | Nuremberg |
| 13:30 CEST (UTC+2) | Uzun 66', 90+2' (pen.) | Report | Teuchert 8' (pen.), 23' (pen.) | Stadium: Max-Morlock-Stadion; Attendance: 30,012; Referee: Patrick Alt |

| 19 August 2023 3 | Hansa Rostock | 1–2 | Hannover 96 | Rostock |
| 13:00 CEST (UTC+2) | Neumann 58' (o.g.) | Report | Neumann 22'; Teuchert 87' (pen.) | Stadium: Ostseestadion; Attendance: 25,700; Referee: Florian Exner |

| 26 August 2023 4 | Hannover 96 | 0–1 | Hamburger SV | Hanover |
| 20:30 CEST (UTC+2) | | Report | Jatta 69' | Stadium: Heinz von Heiden Arena; Attendance: 49,000; Referee: Tobias Reichel |

| 3 September 2023 5 | Greuther Fürth | 1–3 | Hannover 96 | Fürth |
| 13:30 CEST (UTC+2) | Green 50' | Report | Tresoldi 16'; Köhn 22'; Halstenberg 57' | Stadium: Sportpark Ronhof Thomas Sommer; Attendance: 10,091; Referee: Timo Gerach |

| 17 September 2023 6 | Hannover 96 | 7–0 | VfL Osnabrück | Hanover |
| 13:30 CEST (UTC+2) | Nielsen 21', 45+1'; Schaub 59'; Teuchert 63', 71' (pen.); Köhn 77'; Voglsammer 80' | Report | | Stadium: Heinz von Heiden Arena; Attendance: 37,000; Referee: Robin Braun |

| 24 September 2023 7 | Fortuna Düsseldorf | 1–1 | Hannover 96 | Düsseldorf |
| 13:30 CEST (UTC+2) | Tzolis 59' (pen.) | Report | Teuchert 7' | Stadium: Merkur Spiel-Arena; Attendance: 35,444; Referee: Florian Lechner |

| 30 September 2023 8 | Hannover 96 | 2–0 | Wehen Wiesbaden | Hanover |
| 13:00 CEST (UTC+2) | Nielsen 11'; Köhn 74' | Report | | Stadium: Heinz von Heiden Arena; Attendance: 31,100; Referee: Nicolas Winter |

| 6 October 2023 9 | 1. FC Kaiserslautern | 3–1 | Hannover 96 | Kaiserslautern |
| 18:30 CEST (UTC+2) | Tomiak 45+5' (pen.), 90+10' (pen.); Opoku 79' | Report | Nielsen 17' | Stadium: Fritz-Walter-Stadion; Attendance: 43,017; Referee: Michael Bacher |

| 20 October 2023 10 | Hannover 96 | 2–1 | 1. FC Magdeburg | Hanover |
| 18:30 CEST (UTC+2) | Leopold 11'; Teuchert 61' (pen.) | Report | Atik 57' | Stadium: Heinz von Heiden Arena; Attendance: 38,200; Referee: Arne Aarnink |

| 28 October 2023 11 | Schalke 04 | 3–2 | Hannover 96 | Gelsenkirchen |
| 13:00 CEST (UTC+2) | Lasme 42'; Tempelmann 72'; Karaman 77' | Report | Leopold 50'; Halstenberg 90' (pen.) | Stadium: Veltins-Arena; Attendance: 62,271; Referee: Timo Gerach |

| 5 November 2023 12 | Hannover 96 | 2–0 | Eintracht Braunschweig | Hanover |
| 13:30 CET (UTC+1) | Kunze 12'; Halstenberg 42' (pen.) | Report | | Stadium: Heinz von Heiden Arena; Attendance: 42,000; Referee: Sascha Stegemann |

| 10 November 2023 13 | FC St. Pauli | 0–0 | Hannover 96 | Hamburg |
| 18:30 CET (UTC+1) | | Report | | Stadium: Millerntor-Stadion; Attendance: 29,546; Referee: Richard Hempel |

| 24 November 2023 14 | Hannover 96 | 2–2 | Hertha BSC | Hanover |
| 18:30 CET (UTC+1) | Nielsen 67'; Voglsammer 80' | Report | Niederlechner 29'; Klemens 45' | Stadium: Heinz von Heiden Arena; Attendance: 45,100; Referee: Timo Gerach |

| 3 December 2023 15 | SC Paderborn | 1–0 | Hannover 96 | Paderborn |
| 13:30 CET (UTC+1) | Muslija 90+1' | Report | | Stadium: Home Deluxe Arena; Attendance: 11,950; Referee: Robin Braun |

| 8 December 2023 16 | Hannover 96 | 2–2 | Karlsruher SC | Hanover |
| 18:30 CET (UTC+1) | Voglsammer 72'; Muroya 90+1' | Report | Halstenberg 11' (o.g.); Stindl 53' | Stadium: Heinz von Heiden Arena; Attendance: 26,200; Referee: Florian Lechner |

| 16 December 2023 17 | Holstein Kiel | 3–0 | Hannover 96 | Kiel |
| 20:30 CET (UTC+1) | Becker 26'; Arp 27', 45' | Report | | Stadium: Holstein-Stadion; Attendance: 13,902; Referee: Florian Exner |

| 20 January 2024 18 | SV Elversberg | 2–2 | Hannover 96 | Spiesen-Elversberg |
| 13:00 CET (UTC+1) | Rochelt 57'; Jäkel 60' | Report | Tresoldi 8', 69' | Stadium: Waldstadion an der Kaiserlinde; Attendance: 8,150; Referee: Robert Hartmann |

| 26 January 2024 19 | Hannover 96 | 3–0 | 1. FC Nürnberg | Hanover |
| 18:30 CET (UTC+1) | Nielsen 6', 38'; Teuchert 90+2' | Report | | Stadium: Heinz von Heiden Arena; Attendance: 25,100; Referee: Patrick Schwengers |

| 4 February 2024 20 | Hannover 96 | 2–1 | Hansa Rostock | Hanover |
| 13:30 CET (UTC+1) | Schumacher 4' (o.g.); Halstenberg 78' | Report | Pröger 45+5' | Stadium: Heinz von Heiden Arena; Attendance: 31,500; Referee: Alexander Sather |

| 9 February 2024 21 | Hamburger SV | 3–4 | Hannover 96 | Hamburg |
| 18:30 CET (UTC+1) | Bénes 24'; Hadžikadunić 47'; Glatzel 86' | Report | Tresoldi 11'; Ramos 21' (o.g.); Schaub 32'; Ernst 90+8' | Stadium: Volksparkstadion; Attendance: 57,000; Referee: Sören Storks |

| 16 February 2024 22 | Hannover 96 | 2–1 | Greuther Fürth | Hanover |
| 18:30 CET (UTC+1) | Neumann 71'; Tresoldi 90+1' | Report | Sieb 29' | Stadium: Heinz von Heiden Arena; Attendance: 31,500; Referee: Patrick Ittrich |

| 24 February 2024 23 | VfL Osnabrück | 1–0 | Hannover 96 | Osnabrück |
| 13:00 CET (UTC+1) | Engelhardt 61' | Report | | Stadium: Stadion an der Bremer Brücke; Attendance: 15,741; Referee: Tom Bauer |

| 2 March 2024 24 | Hannover 96 | 2–2 | Fortuna Düsseldorf | Hanover |
| 13:00 CET (UTC+1) | Voglsammer 63'; Teuchert 86' | Report | Tzolis 11', 18' | Stadium: Heinz von Heiden Arena; Attendance: 38,500; Referee: Robert Hartmann |

| 9 March 2024 25 | Wehen Wiesbaden | 1–1 | Hannover 96 | Wiesbaden |
| 13:00 CET (UTC+1) | Prtajin 33' | Report | Voglsammer 54' | Stadium: BRITA-Arena; Attendance: 10,089; Referee: Patrick Schwengers |

| 16 March 2024 26 | Hannover 96 | 1–1 | 1. FC Kaiserslautern | Hanover |
| 20:30 CET (UTC+1) | Voglsammer 68' | Report | Redondo 53' | Stadium: Heinz von Heiden Arena; Attendance: 42,500; Referee: Max Burda |

| 31 March 2024 27 | 1. FC Magdeburg | 0–3 | Hannover 96 | Magdeburg |
| 13:30 CEST (UTC+2) | | Report | Dehm 29'; Muroya 84'; Teuchert 90+5' | Stadium: MDCC-Arena; Attendance: 26,440; Referee: Florian Lechner |

| 7 April 2024 28 | Hannover 96 | 1–1 | Schalke 04 | Hanover |
| 13:30 CEST (UTC+2) | Seguin 81' (o.g.) | Report | Ouédraogo 17' | Stadium: Heinz von Heiden Arena; Attendance: 49,000; Referee: Frank Willenborg |

| 14 April 2024 29 | Eintracht Braunschweig | 0–0 | Hannover 96 | Braunschweig |
| 13:30 CEST (UTC+2) | | Report | | Stadium: Eintracht-Stadion; Attendance: 21,660; Referee: Sven Jablonski |

| 21 April 2024 30 | Hannover 96 | 1–2 | FC St. Pauli | Hanover |
| 13:30 CEST (UTC+2) | Gindorf 45' | Report | Afolayan 41'; Eggestein 65' | Stadium: Heinz von Heiden Arena; Attendance: 49,000; Referee: Deniz Aytekin |

| 26 April 2024 31 | Hertha BSC | 1–1 | Hannover 96 | Berlin |
| 18:30 CEST (UTC+2) | Kempf 13' | Report | Leopold 90+3' | Stadium: Olympiastadion; Attendance: 59,192; Referee: Timo Gerach |

| 5 May 2024 32 | Hannover 96 | 3–2 | SC Paderborn | Hanover |
| 13:30 CEST (UTC+2) | Gindorf 6'; Voglsammer 11'; Tresoldi 18' | Report | Kostons 27'; Obermair 40' | Stadium: Heinz von Heiden Arena; Attendance: 36,500; Referee: Robert Kampka |

| 12 May 2024 33 | Karlsruher SC | 1–2 | Hannover 96 | Karlsruhe |
| 13:30 CEST (UTC+2) | Nebel 45' | Report | Voglsammer 19'; Halstenberg 65' | Stadium: BBBank Wildpark; Attendance: 32,140; Referee: Nicolas Winter |

| 19 May 2024 34 | Hannover 96 | 1–2 | Holstein Kiel | Hanover |
| 15:30 CEST (UTC+2) | Schaub 78' | Report | Holtby 26'; Rothe 32' | Stadium: Heinz von Heiden Arena; Attendance: 49,000; Referee: Alexander Sather |

=== DFB-Pokal ===
| 11 August 2023 First round | SV Sandhausen | 3–3 (a.e.t.) (4–2 p) | Hannover 96 | Sandhausen |
| 18:00 CEST (UTC+2) | Hennings 45+3' (pen.); Arrey-Mbi 77' (o.g.); Knipping 86' | Report | Schaub 27'; Halstenberg 42'; Teuchert 82' | Stadium: GP Stadion am Hardtwald; Attendance: 4,605; Referee: Deniz Aytekin |
| | Penalties |
| | Diekmeier (penalty scored); Mühling (penalty scored); Maciejewski (penalty scored); El-Zein (penalty scored) | | (penalty missed) Besuschkow; (penalty scored) Tresoldi; (penalty scored) Halstenberg; (penalty missed) Ernst |

== Statistics ==
=== Appearances and goals ===
| No. | Pos | Player | 2. Bundesliga | | DFB-Pokal | | Total | |
| No. | Pos | Player | Apps | Goals | Apps | Goals | Apps | Goals |
|---|---|---|---|---|---|---|---|---|
| 1 | GK | (Germany) Ron-Robert Zieler | 34 | 0 | 0 | 0 | 34 | 0 |
| 4 | DF | (Germany) Bright Arrey-Mbi | 28+4 | 0 | 1 | 0 | 33 | 0 |
| 5 | DF | (Germany) Phil Neumann | 32 | 2 | 1 | 0 | 33 | 2 |
| 6 | MF | (Germany) Fabian Kunze | 30+2 | 1 | 1 | 0 | 33 | 1 |
| 7 | MF | (Germany) Max Besuschkow | 1 | 0 | 0+1 | 0 | 2 | 0 |
| 8 | MF | (Germany) Enzo Leopold | 30+2 | 3 | 0 | 0 | 32 | 3 |
| 9 | FW | (Germany) Nicolò Tresoldi | 24+6 | 7 | 1 | 0 | 31 | 7 |
| 10 | MF | (Germany) Sebastian Ernst | 10+16 | 1 | 0+1 | 0 | 27 | 1 |
| 11 | MF | (Austria) Louis Schaub | 21+8 | 3 | 1 | 1 | 30 | 4 |
| 13 | MF | (Germany) Max Christiansen | 7+12 | 0 | 1 | 0 | 20 | 0 |
| 16 | FW | (Norway) Håvard Nielsen | 21+6 | 7 | 0 | 0 | 27 | 7 |
| 17 | MF | (Germany) Muhammed Damar | 0+4 | 0 | 0 | 0 | 4 | 0 |
| 18 | DF | (Germany) Derrick Köhn | 20 | 3 | 0+1 | 0 | 21 | 3 |
| 20 | DF | (Germany) Jannik Dehm | 26+2 | 1 | 1 | 0 | 29 | 1 |
| 21 | DF | (Japan) Sei Muroya | 15+10 | 2 | 0+1 | 0 | 26 | 2 |
| 23 | DF | (Germany) Marcel Halstenberg | 32 | 5 | 1 | 1 | 33 | 6 |
| 24 | MF | (Cyprus) Antonio Foti | 0+6 | 0 | 0+1 | 0 | 7 | 0 |
| 25 | MF | (Germany) Lars Gindorf | 5+5 | 2 | 0 | 0 | 10 | 2 |
| 28 | MF | (Germany) Montell Ndikom | 0+1 | 0 | 0 | 0 | 1 | 0 |
| 29 | MF | (Sweden) Kolja Oudenne | 7+6 | 0 | 0 | 0 | 13 | 0 |
| 30 | GK | (Germany) Leo Weinkauf | 0 | 0 | 1 | 0 | 1 | 0 |
| 31 | DF | (Germany) Julian Börner | 1+3 | 0 | 0 | 0 | 4 | 0 |
| 32 | FW | (Germany) Andreas Voglsammer | 14+13 | 8 | 0 | 0 | 27 | 8 |
| 33 | GK | (Germany) Toni Stahl | 0 | 0 | 0 | 0 | 0 | 0 |
| 34 | DF | (Germany) Yannik Lührs | 2+4 | 0 | 0 | 0 | 6 | 0 |
| 35 | GK | (Germany) Leon-Oumar Wechsel | 0 | 0 | 0 | 0 | 0 | 0 |
| 36 | FW | (Germany) Cedric Teuchert | 12+15 | 11 | 1 | 1 | 28 | 12 |
| 37 | DF | (Germany) Brooklyn Ezeh | 2+10 | 0 | 1 | 0 | 13 | 0 |
| 38 | FW | (Germany) Thaddäus-Monju Momuluh | 0+1 | 0 | 0 | 0 | 1 | 0 |
| 40 | MF | (Germany) Christopher Scott | 0+5 | 0 | 0 | 0 | 5 | 0 |

=== Goalscorers ===
| Rank | No. | Pos | Name | 2. Bundesliga | DFB-Pokal | Total |
|---|---|---|---|---|---|---|
| 1 | 36 | FW | (Germany) Cedric Teuchert | 11 | 1 | 12 |
| 2 | 32 | FW | (Germany) Andreas Voglsammer | 8 | 0 | 8 |
| 3 | 9 | FW | (Germany) Nicolò Tresoldi | 7 | 0 | 7 |
| 3 | 16 | FW | (Norway) Håvard Nielsen | 7 | 0 | 7 |
| 5 | 23 | DF | (Germany) Marcel Halstenberg | 5 | 1 | 6 |
| 6 | 11 | MF | (Austria) Louis Schaub | 3 | 1 | 4 |
| 7 | 8 | MF | (Germany) Enzo Leopold | 3 | 0 | 3 |
| 7 | 18 | DF | (Germany) Derrick Köhn | 3 | 0 | 3 |
| 9 | 5 | DF | (Germany) Phil Neumann | 2 | 0 | 2 |
| 9 | 21 | DF | (Japan) Sei Muroya | 2 | 0 | 2 |
| 9 | 25 | MF | (Germany) Lars Gindorf | 2 | 0 | 2 |
| 12 | 6 | MF | (Germany) Fabian Kunze | 1 | 0 | 1 |
| 12 | 10 | MF | (Germany) Sebastian Ernst | 1 | 0 | 1 |
| 12 | 20 | DF | (Germany) Jannik Dehm | 1 | 0 | 1 |
| Own goals | | | | 3 | 0 | 3 |
| Total | | | | 59 | 3 | 62 |

=== Clean sheets ===
| Rank | No. | Pos | Name | 2. Bundesliga | DFB-Pokal | Total |
|---|---|---|---|---|---|---|
| 1 | 1 | GK | (Germany) Ron-Robert Zieler | 7 | 0 | 7 |
| Total | | | | 7 | 0 | 7 |

=== Disciplinary record ===
| Rank | No. | Pos | Name | 2. Bundesliga | | | DFB-Pokal | | | Total | | |
| Rank | No. | Pos | Name | Booked | (yellow card) (yellow-red card) | Sent off (straight red) | Booked | (yellow card) (yellow-red card) | Sent off (straight red) | Booked | (yellow card) (yellow-red card) | Sent off (straight red) |
|---|---|---|---|---|---|---|---|---|---|---|---|---|
| 1 | 23 | DF | (Germany) Marcel Halstenberg | 4 | 0 | 1 | 0 | 0 | 0 | 4 | 0 | 1 |
| 2 | 6 | MF | (Germany) Fabian Kunze | 8 | 0 | 0 | 0 | 0 | 0 | 8 | 0 | 0 |
| 2 | 16 | FW | (Norway) Håvard Nielsen | 3 | 0 | 1 | 0 | 0 | 0 | 3 | 0 | 1 |
| 4 | 5 | DF | (Germany) Phil Neumann | 6 | 0 | 0 | 1 | 0 | 0 | 7 | 0 | 0 |
| 5 | 13 | MF | (Germany) Max Christiansen | 3 | 1 | 0 | 0 | 0 | 0 | 3 | 1 | 0 |
| 6 | 11 | MF | (Austria) Louis Schaub | 0 | 0 | 1 | 0 | 0 | 0 | 0 | 0 | 1 |
| 6 | 20 | DF | (Germany) Jannik Dehm | 5 | 0 | 0 | 0 | 0 | 0 | 5 | 0 | 0 |
| 8 | 1 | GK | (Germany) Ron-Robert Zieler | 4 | 0 | 0 | 0 | 0 | 0 | 4 | 0 | 0 |
| 8 | 32 | FW | (Germany) Andreas Voglsammer | 4 | 0 | 0 | 0 | 0 | 0 | 4 | 0 | 0 |
| 8 | 36 | FW | (Germany) Cedric Teuchert | 4 | 0 | 0 | 0 | 0 | 0 | 4 | 0 | 0 |
| 11 | 4 | DF | (Germany) Bright Arrey-Mbi | 3 | 0 | 0 | 0 | 0 | 0 | 3 | 0 | 0 |
| 11 | 8 | MF | (Germany) Enzo Leopold | 3 | 0 | 0 | 0 | 0 | 0 | 3 | 0 | 0 |
| 11 | 18 | DF | (Germany) Derrick Köhn | 3 | 0 | 0 | 0 | 0 | 0 | 3 | 0 | 0 |
| 11 | 21 | DF | (Japan) Sei Muroya | 3 | 0 | 0 | 0 | 0 | 0 | 3 | 0 | 0 |
| 15 | 37 | DF | (Germany) Brooklyn Ezeh | 2 | 0 | 0 | 0 | 0 | 0 | 2 | 0 | 0 |
| 16 | 9 | FW | (Germany) Nicolò Tresoldi | 1 | 0 | 0 | 0 | 0 | 0 | 1 | 0 | 0 |
| 16 | 25 | MF | (Germany) Lars Gindorf | 1 | 0 | 0 | 0 | 0 | 0 | 1 | 0 | 0 |
| 16 | 30 | GK | (Germany) Leo Weinkauf | 0 | 0 | 0 | 1 | 0 | 0 | 1 | 0 | 0 |
| 16 | 34 | DF | (Germany) Yannik Lührs | 1 | 0 | 0 | 0 | 0 | 0 | 1 | 0 | 0 |
| 16 | 40 | MF | (Germany) Christopher Scott | 1 | 0 | 0 | 0 | 0 | 0 | 1 | 0 | 0 |
| Total | | | | 59 | 1 | 3 | 2 | 0 | 0 | 61 | 1 | 3 |
