= 2022–23 Hannover 96 season =

Hannover 96
2022–23 season
- President: Martin Kind
- Manager: Stefan Leitl
- Stadium: Heinz von Heiden Arena
- 2. Bundesliga: 10th
- DFB-Pokal: Second round
- Top goalscorer: League: Cedric Teuchert (14); All: Cedric Teuchert (14)
- Highest home attendance: 49,000; Hannover v Hamburg; Hannover v Dortmund
- Lowest home attendance: 20,700; Hannover v Regensburg
- Average home league attendance: 30,953
- Biggest win: Magdeburg 0–4 Hannover
- Biggest defeat: Hamburg 6–1 Hannover
Home colours	Away colours	Third colours

The 2022–23 Hannover 96 season was the 127th season in the football club's history and 27th overall and fourth consecutive season in the second flight of German football, the 2. Bundesliga. Hannover 96 also participated in this season's edition of the domestic cup, the DFB-Pokal. This was the 64th season for Hannover in the Heinz von Heiden Arena, located in Hanover, Lower Saxony, Germany.

== Players ==
=== Squad information ===
As of 2 December 2022

Note: Flags indicate national team as defined under FIFA eligibility rules; some limited exceptions apply. Players may hold more than one non-FIFA nationality.

No.	Pos.	Nation	Player
1	GK	GER	Ron-Robert Zieler (captain)
3	DF	GER	Ekin Çelebi
4	DF	GER	Bright Arrey-Mbi (on loan from Bayern Munich)
5	DF	GER	Phil Neumann
6	MF	GER	Fabian Kunze
7	MF	GER	Max Besuschkow
8	MF	GER	Enzo Leopold
9	FW	GER	Hendrik Weydandt
10	MF	GER	Sebastian Ernst
11	MF	AUT	Louis Schaub (vice-captain)
14	FW	GER	Maximilian Beier (on loan from 1899 Hoffenheim)
16	FW	NOR	Håvard Nielsen
18	DF	GER	Derrick Köhn
19	MF	GER	Eric Uhlmann
20	DF	GER	Jannik Dehm

No.	Pos.	Nation	Player
21	DF	JPN	Sei Muroya
22	FW	GER	Sebastian Stolze
23	FW	GER	Nicolò Tresoldi
24	MF	CYP	Antonio Foti (on loan from Eintracht Frankfurt)
27	MF	GER	Tim Walbrecht
29	MF	CMR	Gaël Ondoua
30	GK	GER	Leo Weinkauf
31	DF	GER	Julian Börner (vice-captain)
32	DF	SLO	Luka Krajnc
33	GK	GER	Toni Stahl
34	DF	GER	Yannik Lührs
36	FW	GER	Cedric Teuchert
37	MF	GER	Sebastian Kerk
38	FW	GER	Thaddäus-Monju Momuluh

=== Out on loan ===
Note: Flags indicate national team as defined under FIFA eligibility rules; some limited exceptions apply. Players may hold more than one non-FIFA nationality.

No.	Pos.	Nation	Player
—	FW	GER	Lawrence Ennali (on loan to Rot-Weiss Essen until 30 June 2023)
—	MF	GER	Simon Stehle (on loan to Viktoria Köln until 30 June 2023)

=== Transfers ===
==== In ====
No.	Pos	Player	From	Type	Window	Ends	Fee	Source
3	DF	(Germany) Ekin Çelebi	(Germany) VfB Stuttgart II	Transfer	Summer	30 June 2024	Free	
4	DF	(Germany) Bright Arrey-Mbi	(Germany) Bayern Munich	Loan	Summer	30 June 2023	Free	
5	DF	(Germany) Phil Neumann	(Germany) Holstein Kiel	Transfer	Summer	30 June 2025	Free	
6	MF	(Germany) Fabian Kunze	(Germany) Arminia Bielefeld	Transfer	Summer	30 June 2025	Free	
7	MF	(Germany) Max Besuschkow	(Germany) Jahn Regensburg	Transfer	Summer	30 June 2025	Free	
8	MF	(Germany) Enzo Leopold	(Germany) SC Freiburg II	Transfer	Summer	30 June 2024	Free	
11	MF	(Austria) Louis Schaub	(Germany) 1. FC Köln	Transfer	Summer	30 June 2025	Free	
16	FW	(Norway) Håvard Nielsen	(Germany) Greuther Fürth	Transfer	Summer	30 June 2024	Free	
18	DF	(Germany) Derrick Köhn	(Netherlands) Willem II	Transfer	Summer	30 June 2025	€500,000	
19	MF	(Germany) Eric Uhlmann	(Germany) RB Leipzig U19	Transfer	Summer	30 June 2025	Free	
24	MF	(Cyprus) Antonio Foti	(Germany) Eintracht Frankfurt	Loan	Summer	30 June 2024	Free	
30	GK	(Germany) Leo Weinkauf	(Germany) MSV Duisburg	Return from loan	Summer	30 June 2023	–	
33	GK	(Germany) Toni Stahl	(Germany) Energie Cottbus	Transfer	Summer	30 June 2024	Free	
–	MF	(Germany) Simon Stehle	(Germany) 1. FC Kaiserslautern	Return from loan	Summer	30 June 2023	–	

==== Out ====
No.	Pos	Player	To	Type	Window	Fee	Source
1	GK	(Denmark) Martin Hansen	(Denmark) OB	Transfer	Summer	Free	
3	DF	(Sweden) Niklas Hult	(Sweden) IF Elfsborg	End of contract	Summer	–	
8	MF	(Germany) Mike Frantz	(Germany) 1. FC Saarbrücken	End of contract	Summer	–	
11	MF	(Germany) Linton Maina	(Germany) 1. FC Köln	End of contract	Summer	–	
13	MF	(Germany) Dominik Kaiser	Free agent	End of contract	Summer	–	
17	FW	(Austria) Lukas Hinterseer	(Germany) Hansa Rostock	Transfer	Summer	€200,000	
20	MF	(Germany) Philipp Ochs	(Germany) SV Sandhausen	End of contract	Summer	–	
24	MF	(Tunisia) Marc Lamti	Free agent	End of contract	Summer	–	
28	DF	(Germany) Marcel Franke	(Germany) Karlsruher SC	End of contract	Summer	–	
30	GK	(Germany) Marlon Sündermann	Free agent	End of contract	Summer	–	
32	MF	(Germany) Grace Bokake	(Germany) Schalke 04 II	End of contract	Summer	–	
33	FW	(Guinea) Moussa Doumbouya	(Germany) FC Ingolstadt	End of contract	Summer	–	
35	MF	(Netherlands) Mark Diemers	(Netherlands) Feyenoord	End of loan	Summer	–	
38	FW	(Germany) Mick Gudra	(Germany) TSV Steinbach Haiger	Transfer	Summer	€50,000	
40	FW	(Germany) Lawrence Ennali	(Germany) Rot-Weiss Essen	Loan	Summer	Free	
–	MF	(Germany) Simon Stehle	(Germany) Viktoria Köln	Loan	Summer	Free	

== Friendly matches ==
Win Draw Loss

11 June 2022 Friendly	SC Haßbergen (Germany)	0–15	(Germany) Hannover 96	Haßbergen
15:00 CEST (UTC+2)		Report	Teuchert 8'; Weydandt 9'; Besuschkow 11'; Tresoldi 25', 29', 42', 45'; Beier 47', 53', 57'; Uhlmann 60', 88'; Hinterseer 63', 81'; Stolze 72'	Stadium: Sportanlage Haßbergen; Attendance: 2,000
Note: For the second half, SC Haßbergen was replaced by a selection of players from the Nienburg district.

18 June 2022 Friendly	SV Ramlingen/Ehlershausen (Germany)	0–3	(Germany) Hannover 96	Burgdorf
15:00 CEST (UTC+2)		Report	Tresoldi 31'; Beier 51'; Dehm 67'	Stadium: Wahrendorff-Arena

22 June 2022 Friendly	TSV Havelse (Germany)	1–3	(Germany) Hannover 96	Garbsen
18:00 CEST (UTC+2)	Rufidis 84'	Report	Teuchert 15'; Beier 35'; Kerk 56' (pen.)	Stadium: Wilhelm-Langrehr-Stadion; Attendance: 1,794

25 June 2022 Friendly	Hannover 96 (Germany)	5–2	(Germany) MSV Duisburg	Hanover
13:00 CEST (UTC+2)	Börner 30'; Weydandt 38'; Teuchert 69' (pen.); Stolze 88'; Tresoldi 111'	Report	Stoppelkamp 28'; Neumann 112' (o.g.)	Stadium: Eilenriedestadion; Attendance: 1,300; Referee: Robert Schröder
Note: The match lasted for 2×60 minutes.

2 July 2022 Volkswagen Cup	VfL Wolfsburg (Germany)	1–1	(Germany) Hannover 96	Osnabrück
15:00 CEST (UTC+2)	Bornauw 25'	Report	Weydandt 4'	Stadium: Stadion an der Bremer Brücke; Attendance: 5,700
Note: The match lasted for 1×45 minutes.

2 July 2022 Volkswagen Cup	Hannover 96 (Germany)	1–1	(Germany) VfL Osnabrück	Osnabrück
16:00 CEST (UTC+2)	Beier 42'	Report	Oduah 34'	Stadium: Stadion an der Bremer Brücke; Attendance: 5,700
Note: The match lasted for 1×45 minutes.

9 July 2022 Friendly	Hannover 96 (Germany)	3–0	(Netherlands) Groningen	Hanover
14:00 CEST (UTC+2)	Besuschkow 8', 66'; Weydandt 73'	Report		Stadium: Eilenriedestadion; Attendance: 2,200

9 August 2022 Friendly	Union Berlin (Germany)	1–1	(Germany) Hannover 96	Berlin
16:30 CEST (UTC+2)	Behrens 87'	Report	Tresoldi 54'	Stadium: Friedrich-Ludwig-Jahn-Stadion; Attendance: 825

22 September 2022 Friendly	Hannover 96 (Germany)	2–0	(Germany) Werder Bremen	Hanover
16:00 CEST (UTC+2)	Tresoldi 54', 81'	Report		Stadium: Eilenriedestadion; Attendance: 0 Referee: Harm Osmers

2 December 2022 Friendly	Hannover 96 (Germany)	1–2	(Germany) Hertha BSC	Hanover
15:00 CET (UTC+1)	Weydandt 20'	Report	Kanga 5'; Darida 71'	Stadium: Heinz von Heiden Arena; Referee: Harm Osmers

9 December 2022 Friendly	SC Paderborn (Germany)	1–0	(Germany) Hannover 96	Paderborn
12:00 CET (UTC+1)	Conteh 38'	Report		Stadium: Trainingszentrum; Attendance: 0 Referee: Timo Gansloweit

10 January 2023 Friendly	Hannover 96 (Germany)	2–2	(Switzerland) Zürich	Belek, Turkey
15:30 TRT (UTC+3)	Tresoldi 54'; Teuchert 90+2'	Report	Aiyegun 17'; Okita 32'	Stadium: Cornelia Diamond Hotel

14 January 2023 Friendly	Hannover 96 (Germany)	1–2	(Hungary) Debrecen	Belek, Turkey
15:00 TRT (UTC+3)	Schaub 27'	Report	Manrique 59'; Dzsudzsák 65'

14 January 2023 Friendly	Hannover 96 (Germany)	2–1	(Bulgaria) Ludogorets Razgrad	Belek, Turkey
18:00 TRT (UTC+3)	Tresoldi 11'; Köhn 87'	Report	Despodov 39' (pen.)

21 January 2023 Friendly	Hannover 96 (Germany)	2–1	(Germany) Holstein Kiel	Hanover
13:00 CET (UTC+1)	Teuchert 25'; Neumann 40'	Report	Friðjónsson 98'	Stadium: Eilenriedestadion; Attendance: 0
Note: The match lasted for 2×60 minutes.

22 February 2023 Friendly	Hannover 96 (Germany)	4–1	(Germany) Teutonia Ottensen	Hanover
14:00 CET (UTC+1)	Kerk 19'; Schaub 39'; Friedrich 72'; Tresoldi 82'	Report	Łukowicz 73'	Stadium: Eilenriedestadion; Referee: Robert Schröder

24 March 2023 Friendly	FC St. Pauli (Germany)	2–0	(Germany) Hannover 96	Norderstedt
13:00 CET (UTC+1)	Zander 51'; Afolayan 86'	Report		Stadium: Edmund-Plambeck-Stadion; Attendance: 0

== Competitions ==
Win Draw Loss

=== Overview ===
Competition	First match	Last match	Starting round	Final position	Record							
Competition	First match	Last match	Starting round	Final position	Pld	W	D	L	GF	GA	GD	Win %
2. Bundesliga	15 July 2022	28 May 2023	Matchday 1	10th	34	12	8	14	50	55	−5	35.29
DFB-Pokal	31 July 2022	19 October 2022	First round	Second round	2	1	0	1	3	2	+1	50.00
Total					36	13	8	15	53	57	−4	36.11

Source: Competitions

=== 2. Bundesliga ===
==== League table ====
Pos	Team	Pld	W	D	L	GF	GA	GD	Pts
8	Holstein Kiel	34	12	10	12	58	61	−3	46
9	1. FC Kaiserslautern	34	11	12	11	47	48	−1	45
10	Hannover 96	34	12	8	14	50	55	−5	44
11	1. FC Magdeburg	34	12	7	15	48	55	−7	43
12	Greuther Fürth	34	10	11	13	47	50	−3	41

Source: DFB
Rules for classification: 1) Points; 2) Goal difference; 3) Goals scored; 4) Head-to-head results; 5) Head-to-head away goals scored; 6) Away goals scored; 7) Play-off.

==== Results summary ====
Overall								Home						Away					
Pld	W	D	L	GF	GA	GD	Pts	W	D	L	GF	GA	GD	W	D	L	GF	GA	GD
34	12	8	14	50	55	−5	44	8	3	6	27	26	+1	4	5	8	23	29	−6

Source: DFB

==== Results by round ====
Round	1	2	3	4	5	6	7	8	9	10	11	12	13	14	15	16	17	18	19	20	21	22	23	24	25	26	27	28	29	30	31	32	33	34
Ground	A	H	A	H	A	H	A	H	A	H	A	H	A	H	A	H	A	H	A	H	A	H	A	H	A	H	A	H	A	H	A	H	A	H
Result	L	D	L	W	W	W	W	D	W	L	L	W	D	W	L	W	D	L	L	L	D	L	D	D	L	W	L	L	W	W	L	W	D	L
Position	12	14	15	12	9	9	5	6	4	6	7	5	5	5	6	4	5	7	7	7	9	9	10	10	10	9	10	11	10	8	9	8	9	10

Source: DFB
A = Away; H = Home; W = Win; D = Draw; L = Loss

==== Matches ====
15 July 2022 1	1. FC Kaiserslautern	2–1	Hannover 96	Kaiserslautern
20:30 CEST (UTC+2)	Wunderlich 12'; Kraus 90+2'	Report	Nielsen 80'	Stadium: Fritz-Walter-Stadion; Attendance: 40,579; Referee: Sven Waschitzki-Günther

23 July 2022 2	Hannover 96	2–2	FC St. Pauli	Hanover
20:30 CEST (UTC+2)	Kerk 33' (pen.); Köhn 71'	Report	Eggestein 4'; Irvine 90+5'	Stadium: Heinz von Heiden Arena; Attendance: 33,600; Referee: Felix Zwayer

6 August 2022 3	SC Paderborn	4–2	Hannover 96	Paderborn
13:00 CEST (UTC+2)	Krajnc 28' (o.g.); Pieringer 52'; Schallenberg 60'; Platte 89'	Report	Nielsen 12'; Teuchert 37'	Stadium: Home Deluxe Arena; Attendance: 11,528; Referee: Robin Braun

14 August 2022 4	Hannover 96	1–0	Jahn Regensburg	Hanover
13:30 CEST (UTC+2)	Foti 83'	Report		Stadium: Heinz von Heiden Arena; Attendance: 20,700; Referee: Martin Petersen

19 August 2022 5	1. FC Magdeburg	0–4	Hannover 96	Magdeburg
18:30 CEST (UTC+2)		Report	Beier 14'; Krajnc 44'; Muroya 56'; Teuchert 90+1'	Stadium: MDCC-Arena; Attendance: 22,500; Referee: Robert Kampka

28 August 2022 6	Hannover 96	2–1	Greuther Fürth	Hanover
13:30 CEST (UTC+2)	Beier 52'; Nielsen 86'	Report	Pululu 81'	Stadium: Heinz von Heiden Arena; Attendance: 22,800; Referee: Frank Willenborg

4 September 2022 7	Hansa Rostock	0–1	Hannover 96	Rostock
13:30 CEST (UTC+2)		Report	Beier 42' (pen.)	Stadium: Ostseestadion; Attendance: 24,500; Referee: Timo Gerach

10 September 2022 8	Hannover 96	1–1	Eintracht Braunschweig	Hanover
13:00 CEST (UTC+2)	Nielsen 78'	Report	Ujah 69'	Stadium: Heinz von Heiden Arena; Attendance: 42,000; Referee: Patrick Ittrich

16 September 2022 9	SV Sandhausen	2–3	Hannover 96	Sandhausen
18:30 CEST (UTC+2)	D. Kinsombi 56' (pen.); Ajdini 73'	Report	Teuchert 14'; Nielsen 65'; Muroya 71'	Stadium: BWT-Stadion am Hardtwald; Attendance: 4,137; Referee: Wolfgang Haslberger

30 September 2022 10	Hannover 96	1–2	Hamburger SV	Hanover
18:30 CEST (UTC+2)	Muroya 4'	Report	Börner 15' (o.g.); Königsdörffer 90+2'	Stadium: Heinz von Heiden Arena; Attendance: 49,000; Referee: Felix Brych

9 October 2022 11	1. FC Heidenheim	2–1	Hannover 96	Heidenheim
13:30 CEST (UTC+2)	Thomalla 32'; Kleindienst 61'	Report	Teuchert 90+2'	Stadium: Voith-Arena; Attendance: 8,104; Referee: Christian Dingert

15 October 2022 12	Hannover 96	2–0	Arminia Bielefeld	Hanover
20:30 CEST (UTC+2)	Teuchert 4'; Nielsen 86'	Report		Stadium: Heinz von Heiden Arena; Attendance: 29,200; Referee: Matthias Jöllenbeck

22 October 2022 13	1. FC Nürnberg	0–0	Hannover 96	Nuremberg
13:00 CEST (UTC+2)		Report		Stadium: Max-Morlock-Stadion; Attendance: 28,422; Referee: Felix Zwayer

30 October 2022 14	Hannover 96	1–0	Karlsruher SC	Hanover
13:30 CET (UTC+1)	Weydandt 56'	Report		Stadium: Heinz von Heiden Arena; Attendance: 29,100; Referee: Sven Waschitzki-Günther

4 November 2022 15	Darmstadt 98	1–0	Hannover 96	Darmstadt
18:30 CET (UTC+1)	Mehlem 62'	Report		Stadium: Merck-Stadion am Böllenfalltor; Attendance: 15,475; Referee: Benjamin Cortus

8 November 2022 16	Hannover 96	2–0	Fortuna Düsseldorf	Hanover
18:30 CET (UTC+1)	Nielsen 34'; Teuchert 43'	Report		Stadium: Heinz von Heiden Arena; Attendance: 24,100; Referee: Florian Exner

11 November 2022 17	Holstein Kiel	1–1	Hannover 96	Kiel
18:30 CET (UTC+1)	Bartels 9'	Report	Teuchert 16'	Stadium: Holstein-Stadion; Attendance: 13,744; Referee: Arne Aarnink

28 January 2023 18	Hannover 96	1–3	1. FC Kaiserslautern	Hanover
20:30 CET (UTC+1)	Köhn 17'	Report	Niehues 49'; Boyd 66'; Hercher 90+7'	Stadium: Heinz von Heiden Arena; Attendance: 36,800; Referee: Sascha Stegemann

5 February 2023 19	FC St. Pauli	2–0	Hannover 96	Hamburg
13:30 CET (UTC+1)	Daschner 17'; Metcalfe 27'	Report		Stadium: Millerntor-Stadion; Attendance: 29,546; Referee: Timo Gerach

11 February 2023 20	Hannover 96	3–4	SC Paderborn	Hanover
13:00 CET (UTC+1)	Teuchert 2', 4'; Beier 83'	Report	Leipertz 6', 56'; Muslija 26' (pen.); Conteh 71'	Stadium: Heinz von Heiden Arena; Attendance: 25,100; Referee: Benjamin Cortus

18 February 2023 21	Jahn Regensburg	1–1	Hannover 96	Regensburg
13:00 CET (UTC+1)	Singh 15'	Report	Teuchert 88'	Stadium: Jahnstadion Regensburg; Attendance: 8,112; Referee: Max Burda

26 February 2023 22	Hannover 96	1–2	1. FC Magdeburg	Hanover
13:30 CET (UTC+1)	Schaub 69'	Report	Atik 48'; Castaignos 62'	Stadium: Heinz von Heiden Arena; Attendance: 38,100; Referee: Martin Thomsen

5 March 2023 23	Greuther Fürth	1–1	Hannover 96	Fürth
13:30 CET (UTC+1)	Hrgota 57' (pen.)	Report	Weydandt 54'	Stadium: Sportpark Ronhof Thomas Sommer; Attendance: 10,845; Referee: Florian Heft

12 March 2023 24	Hannover 96	1–1	Hansa Rostock	Hanover
13:30 CET (UTC+1)	Besuschkow 61'	Report	Dressel 44'	Stadium: Heinz von Heiden Arena; Attendance: 31,600; Referee: Daniel Siebert

19 March 2023 25	Eintracht Braunschweig	1–0	Hannover 96	Braunschweig
13:30 CET (UTC+1)	Nikolaou 90+1'	Report		Stadium: Eintracht-Stadion; Attendance: 20,995; Referee: Patrick Ittrich

1 April 2023 26	Hannover 96	3–1	SV Sandhausen	Hanover
13:00 CEST (UTC+2)	Beier 45+2'; Köhn 61'; Schaub 88'	Report	C. Kinsombi 14'	Stadium: Heinz von Heiden Arena; Attendance: 22,400; Referee: Felix Brych

8 April 2023 27	Hamburger SV	6–1	Hannover 96	Hamburg
13:00 CEST (UTC+2)	Kittel 34'; Bénes 41', 61' (pen.); Glatzel 65'; Königsdörffer 75'; Reis 87'	Report	Köhn 52'	Stadium: Volksparkstadion; Attendance: 57,000; Referee: Florian Badstübner

14 April 2023 28	Hannover 96	0–3	1. FC Heidenheim	Hanover
18:30 CEST (UTC+2)		Report	Beste 31'; Kleindienst 35'; Thomalla 45+4'	Stadium: Heinz von Heiden Arena; Attendance: 25,200; Referee: Florian Exner

22 April 2023 29	Arminia Bielefeld	1–3	Hannover 96	Bielefeld
13:00 CEST (UTC+2)	Klos 22'	Report	Teuchert 14', 42' (pen.); Schaub 55'	Stadium: SchücoArena; Attendance: 25,921; Referee: Robert Kampka

29 April 2023 30	Hannover 96	3–0	1. FC Nürnberg	Hanover
20:30 CEST (UTC+2)	Börner 43'; Köhn 49'; Beier 70'	Report		Stadium: Heinz von Heiden Arena; Attendance: 28,500; Referee: Richard Hempel

6 May 2023 31	Karlsruher SC	2–1	Hannover 96	Karlsruhe
13:00 CEST (UTC+2)	Kaufmann 4'; Schleusener 12'	Report	Schaub 43'	Stadium: BBBank Wildpark; Attendance: 21,477; Referee: Patrick Alt

14 May 2023 32	Hannover 96	2–1	Darmstadt 98	Hanover
13:30 CEST (UTC+2)	Nielsen 10'; Teuchert 31'	Report	Tietz 43'	Stadium: Heinz von Heiden Arena; Attendance: 30,000; Referee: Sascha Stegemann

21 May 2023 33	Fortuna Düsseldorf	3–3	Hannover 96	Düsseldorf
13:30 CEST (UTC+2)	Klaus 30', 52'; Ginczek 77'	Report	Teuchert 12'; Schaub 21'; Beier 89'	Stadium: Merkur Spiel-Arena; Attendance: 35,512; Referee: Michael Bacher

28 May 2023 34	Hannover 96	1–5	Holstein Kiel	Hanover
15:30 CEST (UTC+2)	Neumann 72'	Report	Reese 21'; Becker 24'; Pichler 45'; Bartels 59', 62'	Stadium: Heinz von Heiden Arena; Attendance: 38,000; Referee: Martin Thomsen

=== DFB-Pokal ===
31 July 2022 First round	Schott Mainz	0–3	Hannover 96	Mainz
15:31 CEST (UTC+2)		Report	Ahlbach 36' (o.g.); Beier 42'; Haas 50' (o.g.)	Stadium: Bruchwegstadion; Attendance: 4,500; Referee: Florian Exner

19 October 2022 Second round	Hannover 96	0–2	Borussia Dortmund	Hanover
18:00 CEST (UTC+2)		Report	Arrey-Mbi 11' (o.g.); Bellingham 71' (pen.)	Stadium: Heinz von Heiden Arena; Attendance: 49,000; Referee: Sven Jablonski

== Statistics ==
=== Appearances and goals ===
No.	Pos	Player	2. Bundesliga		DFB-Pokal		Total	
No.	Pos	Player	Apps	Goals	Apps	Goals	Apps	Goals
1	GK	(Germany) Ron-Robert Zieler	34	0	0	0	34	0
3	DF	(Germany) Ekin Çelebi	0+1	0	0	0	1	0
4	DF	(Germany) Bright Arrey-Mbi	14+1	0	1	0	16	0
5	DF	(Germany) Phil Neumann	28+1	1	2	0	31	1
6	MF	(Germany) Fabian Kunze	27+3	0	2	0	32	0
7	MF	(Germany) Max Besuschkow	23+8	1	2	0	33	1
8	MF	(Germany) Enzo Leopold	11+10	0	0+2	0	23	0
9	FW	(Germany) Hendrik Weydandt	6+17	2	1	0	24	2
10	MF	(Germany) Sebastian Ernst	7+12	0	0	0	19	0
11	MF	(Austria) Louis Schaub	17+8	5	1	0	26	5
14	FW	(Germany) Maximilian Beier	25+8	7	2	1	35	8
16	FW	(Norway) Håvard Nielsen	30+3	8	2	0	35	8
17	FW	(Austria) Lukas Hinterseer	0	0	0	0	0	0
18	DF	(Germany) Derrick Köhn	33	5	1+1	0	35	5
19	MF	(Germany) Eric Uhlmann	0	0	0	0	0	0
20	DF	(Germany) Jannik Dehm	13+6	0	1	0	20	0
21	DF	(Japan) Sei Muroya	26+5	3	2	0	33	3
22	FW	(Germany) Sebastian Stolze	1+5	0	0+2	0	8	0
23	FW	(Germany) Nicolò Tresoldi	6+7	0	0+1	0	14	0
24	MF	(Cyprus) Antonio Foti	1+10	1	0+1	0	12	1
27	MF	(Germany) Tim Walbrecht	0	0	0	0	0	0
29	MF	(Cameroon) Gaël Ondoua	1+1	0	0	0	2	0
30	GK	(Germany) Leo Weinkauf	0	0	2	0	2	0
31	DF	(Germany) Julian Börner	25+1	1	1	0	27	1
32	DF	(Slovenia) Luka Krajnc	17+3	1	1	0	21	1
33	GK	(Germany) Toni Stahl	0	0	0	0	0	0
34	DF	(Germany) Yannik Lührs	4	0	0	0	4	0
36	FW	(Germany) Cedric Teuchert	19+10	14	0+1	0	30	14
37	MF	(Germany) Sebastian Kerk	4+11	1	1+1	0	17	1
38	FW	(Germany) Thaddäus-Monju Momuluh	2+3	0	0	0	5	0

=== Goalscorers ===
Rank	No.	Pos	Name	2. Bundesliga	DFB-Pokal	Total
1	36	FW	(Germany) Cedric Teuchert	14	0	14
2	14	FW	(Germany) Maximilian Beier	7	1	8
2	16	FW	(Norway) Håvard Nielsen	8	0	8
4	11	MF	(Austria) Louis Schaub	5	0	5
4	18	DF	(Germany) Derrick Köhn	5	0	5
6	21	DF	(Japan) Sei Muroya	3	0	3
7	9	FW	(Germany) Hendrik Weydandt	2	0	2
8	5	DF	(Germany) Phil Neumann	1	0	1
8	7	MF	(Germany) Max Besuschkow	1	0	1
8	24	MF	(Cyprus) Antonio Foti	1	0	1
8	31	DF	(Germany) Julian Börner	1	0	1
8	32	DF	(Slovenia) Luka Krajnc	1	0	1
8	37	MF	(Germany) Sebastian Kerk	1	0	1
Own goals				0	2	2
Total				50	3	53

=== Clean sheets ===
Rank	No.	Pos	Name	2. Bundesliga	DFB-Pokal	Total
1	1	GK	(Germany) Ron-Robert Zieler	8	0	8
2	30	GK	(Germany) Leo Weinkauf	0	1	1
Total				8	1	9

=== Disciplinary record ===
Rank	No.	Pos	Name	2. Bundesliga			DFB-Pokal			Total		
Rank	No.	Pos	Name	Yellow card	(yellow card) (yellow-red card)	Red card	Yellow card	(yellow card) (yellow-red card)	Red card	Yellow card	(yellow card) (yellow-red card)	Red card
1	6	MF	(Germany) Fabian Kunze	12	1	0	1	0	0	13	1	0
2	5	DF	(Germany) Phil Neumann	5	1	1	0	0	0	5	1	1
3	18	DF	(Germany) Derrick Köhn	7	0	0	0	0	0	7	0	0
4	16	FW	(Norway) Håvard Nielsen	6	0	0	0	0	0	6	0	0
4	31	DF	(Germany) Julian Börner	6	0	0	0	0	0	6	0	0
6	21	DF	(Japan) Sei Muroya	5	0	0	0	0	0	5	0	0
6	32	DF	(Slovenia) Luka Krajnc	5	0	0	0	0	0	5	0	0
6	34	DF	(Germany) Yannik Lührs	0	0	1	0	0	0	0	0	1
9	8	MF	(Germany) Enzo Leopold	4	0	0	0	0	0	4	0	0
10	1	GK	(Germany) Ron-Robert Zieler	3	0	0	0	0	0	3	0	0
10	7	MF	(Germany) Max Besuschkow	2	0	0	1	0	0	3	0	0
10	10	MF	(Germany) Sebastian Ernst	3	0	0	0	0	0	3	0	0
10	36	FW	(Germany) Cedric Teuchert	3	0	0	0	0	0	3	0	0
14	38	FW	(Germany) Thaddäus-Monju Momuluh	2	0	0	0	0	0	2	0	0
15	4	DF	(Germany) Bright Arrey-Mbi	1	0	0	0	0	0	1	0	0
15	9	FW	(Germany) Hendrik Weydandt	1	0	0	0	0	0	1	0	0
15	11	MF	(Austria) Louis Schaub	1	0	0	0	0	0	1	0	0
15	14	FW	(Germany) Maximilian Beier	1	0	0	0	0	0	1	0	0
15	20	DF	(Germany) Jannik Dehm	1	0	0	0	0	0	1	0	0
15	24	MF	(Cyprus) Antonio Foti	1	0	0	0	0	0	1	0	0
15	29	MF	(Cameroon) Gaël Ondoua	1	0	0	0	0	0	1	0	0
15	37	MF	(Germany) Sebastian Kerk	1	0	0	0	0	0	1	0	0
Total				71	2	2	2	0	0	73	2	2
