= Nicolò Tresoldi =

German footballer (born 2004)

Personal information
- Date of birth: 20 August 2004 (age 22)
- Place of birth: Cagliari, Italy
- Height: 1.86 m (6 ft 1 in)
- Position: Striker

Team information
- Current team: Club Brugge
- Number: 7

Youth career
- 2015–2017: ASD Fontanelle
- 2018–2023: Hannover 96

Senior career*
Years	Team	Apps	(Gls)
2021–2023	Hannover 96 II	11	(3)
2022–2025	Hannover 96	77	(14)
2025–	Club Brugge	50	(27)

International career^{‡}
2022–2023	Germany U19	8	(3)
2023–	Germany U21	27	(16)
Medal record
Men's football
Representing Germany
UEFA European Under-21 Championship
Runner-up	2025 Slovakia
- * Club domestic league appearances and goals as of 22:45, 31 October 2026 (UTC) ‡ National team caps and goals as of 18:45, 6 October 2026 (UTC)

Nicolò Tresoldi (Italian pronunciation: [nikoˈlɔ ttreˈsɔldi]; born 20 August 2004) is a professional footballer who plays as a striker for Belgian Pro League club Club Brugge. Born in Italy, he plays for the Germany under-21 national team.

== Early life ==
Born in Cagliari, Sardinia, Tresoldi later settled with his family in Gubbio, where he started playing both football and tennis before choosing to focus on football. He was born to an Italian father and an Argentine mother of Italian descent (originally from Bergamo). His father, Emanuele Tresoldi, was also a footballer.

Tresoldi was offered trials at several high-profile Italian clubs, before moving to Hanover, Germany, with his family at the age of 13 for his mother's work. He then joined the youth sector of Hannover 96.

== Club career ==
Having impressed during his stints for the under-17 and under-19 teams, on 5 January 2022 Tresoldi signed his first professional contract with the club, with the deal set to be officially activated on the player's eighteenth birthday on 20 August.

After featuring for Hannover's reserve team towards the end of the 2021–22 season, Tresoldi made his professional debut for Hannover 96 in the 2. Bundesliga on 15 July 2022, against 1. FC Kaiserslautern, coming on as a substitute for Maximilian Beier in the 88th minute; the match eventually ended in a 1–2 away loss for his side.

On 7 June 2025, Tresoldi joined Belgian Pro League side Club Brugge by signing a contract until 2029. Later that year, on 18 September, he scored his first UEFA Champions League goal in a 4–1 victory over Monaco. He concluded his debut season as the league's top scorer with 19 goals. A year later, on 13 October, he netted his first Champions League hat-trick in a 4–3 away win over Inter Milan.

== International career ==
Tresoldi can choose to represent either Italy, Argentina or Germany in international matches.

On 25 October 2022, Tresoldi made his debut for the German under-19 national team in a 1–0 friendly match loss against Spain. Tresoldi took part at the UEFA European Under-21 Championship in 2025. During the tournament, he competed upfront with fellow teammates Nick Woltemade and Nelson Weiper. He scored a goal throughout the tournament and reach the final, which his side lost 3–2 to England.

After Italy failed to qualify for the 2026 FIFA World Cup and Tresoldi registered 20 goals and eight assists in his debut season for Brugge, Julian Nagelsmann almost called him up for Germany's World Cup squad, stating that Tresoldi is a classic number 9 that Germany could have benefited from. Due to tactical reasons, Nagelsmann chose other strikers before him, adding that Tresoldi's "time will come".

== Personal life ==
Tresoldi is fluent in four languages: Italian, German, English, and Spanish.

== Career statistics ==
As of match played 4 November 2026

Appearances and goals by club, season and competition
Club	Season	League			National cup (Note: Includes DFB-Pokal, Belgian Cup)		Europe		Other		Total	
Club	Season	Division	Apps	Goals	Apps	Goals	Apps	Goals	Apps	Goals	Apps	Goals
Hannover 96 II	2021–22	Regionalliga Nord	4	0	—		—		—		4	0
Hannover 96 II	2022–23	Regionalliga Nord	7	3	—		—		—		7	3
Hannover 96 II	Total		11	3	—		—		—		11	3
Hannover 96	2022–23	2. Bundesliga	13	0	1	0	—		—		14	0
Hannover 96	2023–24	2. Bundesliga	30	7	1	0	—		—		31	7
Hannover 96	2024–25	2. Bundesliga	34	7	1	0	—		—		35	7
Hannover 96	Total		77	14	3	0	—		—		80	14
Club Brugge	2025–26	Belgian Pro League	40	19	3	0	14 (Note: Appearances in UEFA Champions League)	4	1 (Note: Appearance in Belgian Super Cup)	0	58	23
Club Brugge	2026–27	Belgian Pro League	10	8	1	0	4	5	1	1	16	14
Club Brugge	Total		50	27	4	0	18	9	2	1	74	37
Career total			138	44	7	0	18	9	2	1	164	54

== Honours ==
Club Brugge

- Belgian Pro League: 2025–26
- Belgian Super Cup: 2025

Germany U21

- UEFA European Under-21 Championship runner-up: 2025

Individual

- Belgian Pro League top scorer: 2025–26
