= Sebastian Ernst (footballer) =

German footballer (born 1995)

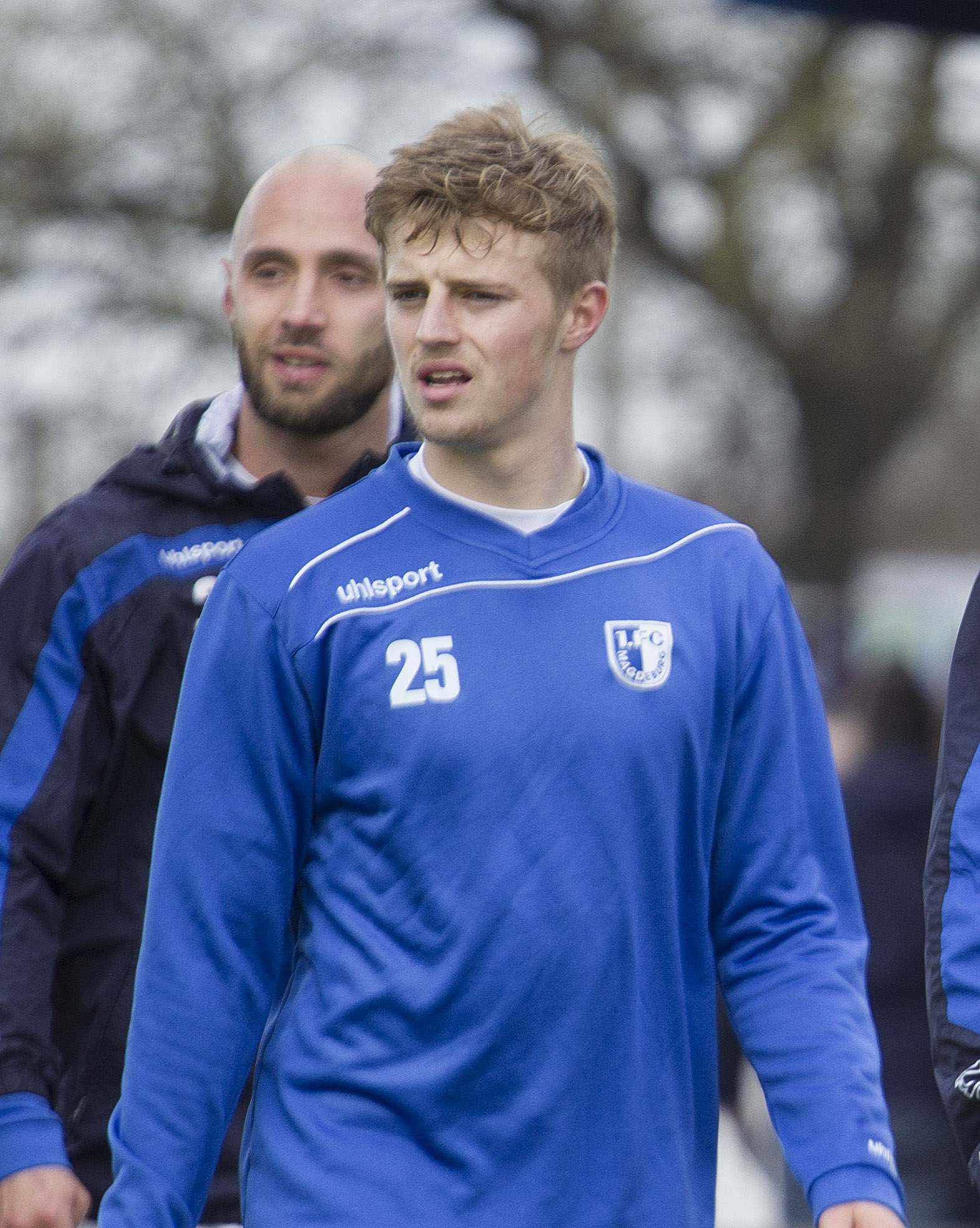
- Ernst in 2016

Personal information
- Date of birth: 4 March 1995 (age 31)
- Place of birth: Neustadt am Rübenberge, Germany
- Height: 1.77 m (5 ft 10 in)
- Position: Midfielder

Youth career
- 2012–2013: Hannover 96

Senior career*
Years	Team	Apps	(Gls)
2013–2015	Hannover 96 II	71	(19)
2014–2016	Hannover 96	0	(0)
2016–2017	1. FC Magdeburg	26	(4)
2017	Würzburger Kickers	8	(0)
2017–2021	Greuther Fürth	111	(13)
2017	Greuther Fürth II	5	(1)
2021–2024	Hannover 96	63	(2)
2022	Hannover 96 II	1	(0)
2024–2025	Jahn Regensburg	29	(0)
2025–2026	ŁKS Łódź	27	(1)
- * Club domestic league appearances and goals as of 15:53, 29 May 2026 (UTC)

Sebastian Ernst (born 4 March 1995) is a German professional footballer who plays as a midfielder.

== Career ==
Ernst is a Hannover 96 youth exponent.

In the 2016–17 winter transfer window, Ernst moved to 2. Bundesliga club Würzburger Kickers from 1. FC Magdeburg and made 7 appearances in the second half of the season.

Following Würzburger Kicker's relegation Ernst remained in the 2. Bundesliga signing a three-year contract with SpVgg Greuther Fürth in June 2017. He joined on a free transfer.

Ernst rejoined Hannover 96 ahead of the 2021–22 season.

After his contract expired at the end of the 2023–24 season, Ernst joined Jahn Regensburg on a two-year contract.

On 24 June 2025, Ernst moved abroad for the first time in his career to join Polish second division club ŁKS Łódź on a two-year deal. His contract was terminated by mutual consent on 18 July 2026.

== Career statistics ==
As of match played 28 May 2026

Appearances and goals by club, season and competition
Club	Season	League			National cup (Note: Includes DFB-Pokal, Polish Cup)		Total	
Club	Season	Division	Apps	Goals	Apps	Goals	Apps	Goals
Hannover 96 II	2012–13	Regionalliga Nord	3	1	—		3	1
Hannover 96 II	2013–14	Regionalliga Nord	30	10	—		30	10
Hannover 96 II	2014–15	Regionalliga Nord	21	7	—		21	7
Hannover 96 II	2015–16	Regionalliga Nord	17	1	—		17	1
Hannover 96 II	Total		71	19	0	0	71	19
Hannover 96	2014–15	Bundesliga	0	0	1	0	1	0
1. FC Magdeburg	2015–16	3. Liga	15	3	—		15	3
1. FC Magdeburg	2016–17	3. Liga	11	1	0	0	11	1
1. FC Magdeburg	Total		26	4	0	0	26	4
Würzburger Kickers	2016–17	2. Bundesliga	8	0	0	0	8	0
Greuther Fürth	2017–18	2. Bundesliga	21	2	1	1	22	3
Greuther Fürth	2018–19	2. Bundesliga	31	1	1	1	32	2
Greuther Fürth	2019–20	2. Bundesliga	26	3	0	0	26	3
Greuther Fürth	2020–21	2. Bundesliga	33	7	3	2	36	9
Greuther Fürth	Total		111	13	5	4	116	17
Greuther Fürth II	2017–18	Regionalliga Bayern	5	1	—		5	1
Hannover 96	2021–22	2. Bundesliga	18	1	3	0	21	1
Hannover 96	2022–23	2. Bundesliga	19	0	0	0	19	0
Hannover 96	2023–24	2. Bundesliga	26	1	1	0	27	1
Hannover 96	Total		63	2	4	0	67	2
Hannover 96 II	2022–23	Regionalliga Nord	1	0	—		1	0
Jahn Regensburg	2024–25	2. Bundesliga	29	0	3	0	32	0
ŁKS Łódź	2025–26	I liga	27 (Note: Includes one appearance in I liga promotion play-offs)	1	2	0	29	1
Career total			341	40	15	4	356	44
