= Yannik Lührs =

German footballer (born 2003)

Personal information
- Full name: Yannik Luka Lührs
- Date of birth: 9 September 2003 (age 23)
- Place of birth: Hanover, Germany
- Height: 1.89 m (6 ft 2 in)
- Position: Centre-back

Team information
- Current team: Darmstadt 98
- Number: 49

Youth career
- –2018: TSV Bemerode
- 2018–2022: Hannover 96

Senior career*
Years	Team	Apps	(Gls)
2021–2024	Hannover 96 II	22	(0)
2023–2024	Hannover 96	10	(0)
2024–2025	Borussia Dortmund II	37	(2)
2024–2025	Borussia Dortmund	3	(0)
2025–2026	TSG Hoffenheim II	33	(1)
2026–	Darmstadt 98	0	(0)

International career^{‡}
2021–2022	Germany U19	2	(0)
2024	Germany U20	2	(0)
- * Club domestic league appearances and goals as of 30 May 2026 ‡ National team caps and goals as of 12:10, 9 November 2024 (UTC)

Yannik Luka Lührs (born 9 September 2003) is a German professional footballer who plays for 2. Bundesliga club Darmstadt 98 as a centre-back.

== Club career ==
Born and raised in Hanover, Lührs joined the youth department of Hannover 96 in the summer of 2018 after his beginnings in the youth department of local club TSV Bemerode. For the club, he played 36 matches in the Under 17 Bundesliga and 21 matches in the Under 19 Bundesliga, in which he scored a total of two goals. In the summer of 2022, he was promoted to the reserve team's squad in the Regionalliga Nord. At the end of October 2022, he signed his first professional contract with the club. He made his first professional appearance in the 2. Bundesliga on 8 April 2023 in a 6–1 away defeat against Hamburger SV in the starting lineup.

Lührs joined Borussia Dortmund II on a two-year contract starting in the 2024–25 season.

On 1 September 2025, Lührs signed with 3. Liga club TSG Hoffenheim II, the reserve team of TSG Hoffenheim.

On 25 June 2026, Lührs moved to Darmstadt 98 in 2. Bundesliga.

== International career ==
Lührs played a total of two games for the German national under-19 team in 2021 and 2022.

== Career statistics ==
As of match played 10 January 2025

Appearances and goals by club, season and competition
Club	Season	League			DFB-Pokal		Europe		Other		Total	
Club	Season	Division	Apps	Goals	Apps	Goals	Apps	Goals	Apps	Goals	Apps	Goals
Hannover 96 II	2021–22	Regionalliga Südwest	4	0	—		—		—		4	0
Hannover 96 II	2022–23	Regionalliga Südwest	14	0	—		—		—		14	0
Hannover 96 II	2023–24	Regionalliga Südwest	4	0	—		—		—		4	0
Hannover 96 II	Total		22	0	—		—		—		22	0
Hannover 96	2022–23	2. Bundesliga	4	0	—		—		—		4	0
Hannover 96	2023–24	2. Bundesliga	6	0	0	0	—		—		6	0
Hannover 96	Total		10	0	0	0	—		—		10	0
Borussia Dortmund II	2024–25	3. Liga	14	0	—		—		—		14	0
Borussia Dortmund	2024–25	Bundesliga	3	0	0	0	0	0	0	0	3	0
career total			49	0	0	0	0	0	0	0	49	0
