= Bright Arrey-Mbi =

German footballer

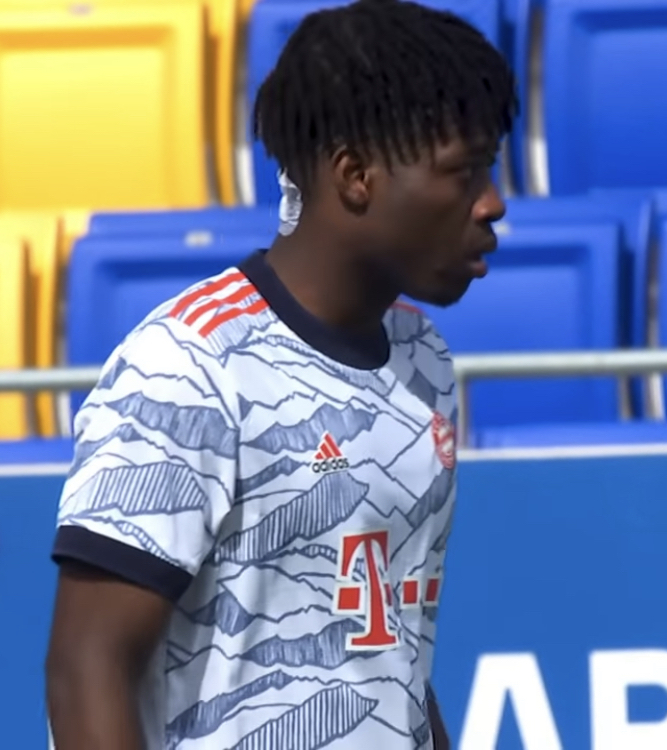
- Arrey-Mbi playing for Bayern Munich U19 in 2021

Personal information
- Full name: Bright Akwo Arrey-Mbi
- Date of birth: 26 March 2003 (age 23)
- Place of birth: Kumba, Cameroon
- Height: 1.87 m (6 ft 2 in)
- Position: Centre-back

Team information
- Current team: Braga
- Number: 26

Youth career
- –2014: SG Kaarst
- 2014: Norwich City
- 2014–2019: Chelsea
- 2019–2020: Bayern Munich

Senior career*
Years	Team	Apps	(Gls)
2020–2022	Bayern Munich II	34	(2)
2021–2023	Bayern Munich	0	(0)
2022	→ 1. FC Köln (loan)	0	(0)
2022	→ 1. FC Köln II (loan)	9	(0)
2022–2023	→ Hannover 96 (loan)	15	(0)
2023–2024	Hannover 96	32	(0)
2024–	Braga	40	(0)

International career^{‡}
2016	England U15	8	(0)
2018–2019	Germany U16	6	(0)
2019–2020	Germany U17	9	(0)
2021–2022	Germany U19	9	(0)
2023–2025	Germany U21	17	(1)
Medal record
Men's football
Representing Germany
UEFA European Under-21 Championship
Runner-up	2025 Slovakia
- * Club domestic league appearances and goals as of 14 September 2026 ‡ National team caps and goals as of 10:10, 29 June 2025 (UTC)

Bright Akwo Arrey-Mbi (born 26 March 2003) is a professional footballer who plays as a centre-back for Primeira Liga club Braga. Born in Cameroon, he has represented England and Germany at youth levels internationally.

== Early life ==
Arrey-Mbi moved to England at age 11. He was educated at St Thomas More School in Bedford, England.

== Club career ==
=== Bayern Munich ===
Bright Arrey-Mbi made his professional debut for Bayern Munich II on 19 September 2020 in a 3. Liga game against Türkgücü München. Later he made his Champions League debut for Bayern Munich senior team on 1 December 2020 against Atlético Madrid.

==== Loan to 1. FC Köln ====
On 30 January 2022 German sports magazine Kicker reported that Arrey-Mbi would join Bundesliga club 1. FC Köln, on loan for 18 months until 30 June 2023.

=== Hannover 96 ===
After he did not feature in any first-team matches while at the club, Bayern Munich decided to terminate the loan agreement with Köln in August 2022, he was then loaned out to 2. Bundesliga club Hannover 96 on a deal until June 2023. He joined Hannover 96 permanently on 1 July 2023.

=== Braga ===
On 17 July 2024, Arrey-Mbi joined Portuguese Primeira Liga club Braga for a transfer fee of €6.2 million.

== International career ==
Born in Cameroon, Arrey-Mbi grew up in England and Germany. He moved to England at a young age and represented the England U15s eight times, before switching back to represent Germany internationally. He remains eligible to play for England, Germany or Cameroon internationally.

== Style of play ==
Arrey-Mbi mainly operates as a centre-back and can also play as a left-back.

== Career statistics ==
As of match played 29 October 2026

Appearances and goals by club, season and competition
Club	Season	League			National cup (Note: Includes DFB-Pokal, Taça de Portugal)		League cup (Note: Includes Taça da Liga)		Europe		Other		Total	
Club	Season	Division	Apps	Goals	Apps	Goals	Apps	Goals	Apps	Goals	Apps	Goals	Apps	Goals
Bayern Munich II	2020–21	3. Liga	15	0	—		—		—		—		15	0
Bayern Munich II	2021–22	Regionalliga Bayern	19	2	—		—		—		—		19	2
Bayern Munich II	Total		34	2	—		—		—		—		34	2
Bayern Munich	2020–21	Bundesliga	0	0	0	0	—		1 (Note: Appearance in UEFA Champions League)	0	0	0	1	0
Bayern Munich	2021–22	Bundesliga	0	0	0	0	—		0	0	0	0	0	0
Bayern Munich	Total		0	0	0	0	—		0	0	0	0	1	0
1. FC Köln (loan)	2021–22	Bundesliga	0	0	0	0	—		—		—		0	0
1. FC Köln (loan)	2022–23	Bundesliga	0	0	0	0	—		—		—		0	0
1. FC Köln (loan)	Total		0	0	0	0	—		—		—		0	0
1. FC Köln II (loan)	2021–22	Regionalliga West	6	0	—		—		—		—		6	0
1. FC Köln II (loan)	2022–23	Regionalliga West	3	0	—		—		—		—		3	0
1. FC Köln II (loan)	Total		9	0	—		—		—		—		9	0
Hannover 96 (loan)	2022–23	2. Bundesliga	15	0	1	0	—		—		—		16	0
Hannover 96	2023–24	2. Bundesliga	32	0	1	0	—		—		—		33	0
Braga	2024–25	Primeira Liga	15	0	2	0	1	0	10 (Note: Appearances in UEFA Europa League)	0	—		28	0
Braga	2025–26	Primeira Liga	23	0	4	0	3	0	15	0	—		45	0
Braga	2026–27	Primeira Liga	3	0	0	0	1	0	4 (Note: Appearances in UEFA Conference League)	0	—		8	0
Braga	Total		41	0	6	0	4	0	29	0	—		80	0
Career total			131	2	8	0	5	0	29	0	0	0	173	2

== Honours ==
Germany U21

- UEFA European Under-21 Championship runner-up: 2025

Individual

- UEFA European Under-21 Championship Team of the Tournament: 2025
