= Antonio Foti =

Cypriot footballer (born 2003)

Personal information
- Full name: Antonio Antonis Foti
- Date of birth: 3 November 2003 (age 23)
- Place of birth: Varna, Bulgaria
- Height: 1.78 m (5 ft 10 in)
- Position: Midfielder

Team information
- Current team: SC Verl
- Number: 26

Youth career
- 2012–2017: Cherno More
- 2017–2019: Omonia
- 2020–2022: Eintracht Frankfurt

Senior career*
Years	Team	Apps	(Gls)
2019–2020	Omonia	0	(0)
2019	→ Ormideia (loan)	12	(5)
2020–2024	Eintracht Frankfurt	0	(0)
2022–2024	→ Hannover 96 (loan)	17	(1)
2022–2024	→ Hannover 96 II (loan)	9	(9)
2024–2026	Borussia Dortmund II	53	(5)
2026–	SC Verl	9	(0)

International career^{‡}
- Bulgaria U15
- Cyprus U15
2018	Cyprus U16	3	(1)
2019	Cyprus U17	3	(0)
2021	Cyprus U19	7	(0)
2022–2024	Cyprus U21	12	(1)
2025–	Cyprus	2	(0)
- * Club domestic league appearances and goals as of 28 May 2026 ‡ National team caps and goals as of 18:53, 15 November 2025 (UTC)

Antonio Antonis Foti (Greek: Αντόνιο Αντώνης Φώτη; Bulgarian: Антонио Антонис Фоти; born 3 November 2003) is a professional footballer who plays as a midfielder for German 3. Liga club SC Verl. Born in Bulgaria, he represents the Cyprus national team.

== Club career ==
Born in Varna, Bulgaria, Foti started his career with Cherno More, before moving to Cyprus in 2017 to sign for Omonia.

Before and after just turning 16 years old, and specifically between 12 September and 31 December 2019, he spent the first half of the 2019–20 season out on loan to Cypriot Third Division club Ormideia FC, scoring five times in twelve senior first-team appearances.

After offers from Fiorentina and Wolverhampton Wanderers, Foti moved to Germany to join Bundesliga club Eintracht Frankfurt in January 2020. His career in Frankfurt got off to a great start, with Foti notably scoring 14 goals in 16 under-19 appearances at the beginning of the 2021–22 season. As a result of his stellar form, Foti signed a new contract with the German club in January 2022.

On 16 June 2022, Foti was loaned out to Hannover 96 in the 2. Bundesliga for two seasons. After returning from his loan, he was signed by Borussia Dortmund II.

On 3 January 2026, Foti moved to SC Verl in 3. Liga.

== International career ==
Having represented Bulgaria at youth international level, Foti switched his allegiance to Cyprus, the country of his father.

== Personal life ==
Antonio was born to a Greek Cypriot father and a Bulgarian mother. He is the brother of fellow footballer Hristian Foti.

== Career statistics ==
=== Club ===
As of 1 July 2024

Appearances and goals by club, season and competition
Club	Season	League			Cup		Other		Total	
Club	Season	Division	Apps	Goals	Apps	Goals	Apps	Goals	Apps	Goals
Omonia	2019–20	Cypriot First Division	0	0	0	0	–		0	0
Ormideia (loan)	2019–20	Cypriot Third Division	12	5	0	0	–		12	5
Eintracht Frankfurt	2020–21	Bundesliga	0	0	0	0	–		0	0
Eintracht Frankfurt	2021–22	Bundesliga	0	0	0	0	0	0	0	0
Eintracht Frankfurt	2022–23	Bundesliga	0	0	0	0	0	0	0	0
Eintracht Frankfurt	Total		0	0	0	0	0	0	0	0
Hannover 96 (loan)	2022–23	2. Bundesliga	11	1	1 (Note: Appearances in the DFB-Pokal)	0	–		12	1
Hannover 96 (loan)	2023–24	2. Bundesliga	6	0	1	0	–		7	0
Hannover 96 (loan)	Total		17	1	2	0	0	0	19	1
Hannover 96 II (loan)	2022–23	Regionalliga Nord	2	1	–		–		2	1
Hannover 96 II (loan)	2023–24	Regionalliga Nord	7	8	–		–		7	8
Hannover 96 II (loan)	Total		9	9	0	0	0	0	9	9
Borussia Dortmund II	2024–25	3. Liga	0	0	–		–		0	0
Career total			38	15	2	0	0	0	40	15
