= Enzo Leopold =

German footballer (born 2000)

Personal information
- Date of birth: 23 July 2000 (age 26)
- Place of birth: Zell am Harmersbach, Germany
- Height: 1.73 m (5 ft 8 in)
- Position: Midfielder

Team information
- Current team: Borussia Mönchengladbach
- Number: 8

Youth career
- –2013: Zeller FV
- 2013–2019: SC Freiburg

Senior career*
Years	Team	Apps	(Gls)
2019–2022	SC Freiburg II	43	(3)
2022–2026	Hannover 96	120	(8)
2026–	Borussia Mönchengladbach	0	(0)
- * Club domestic league appearances and goals as of 1 July 2026

Enzo Leopold (born 23 July 2000) is a German professional footballer who plays as a midfielder for Bundesliga club Borussia Mönchengladbach.

== Career ==
Leopold made his professional debut for SC Freiburg II in the 3. Liga on 2 October 2021 against Hallescher FC.

On 10 May 2022, Leopold signed a two-year contract with Hannover 96, starting in the 2022–23 season. Enzo already has 5 goal contributions for his team in the 2023/2024 season.

On 27 May 2026, Leopold joined Borussia Mönchengladbach on a free transfer, where he signed a four-year contract until 2030. He tore his ACL in training sidelining him for multiple months.

== Career statistics ==
As of match played 23 August 2026

Appearances and goals by club, season and competition
Club	Season	League			Cup		Europe		Other		Total	
Club	Season	Division	Apps	Goals	Apps	Goals	Apps	Goals	Apps	Goals	Apps	Goals
SC Freiburg II	2019–20	Regionalliga Südwest	1	0	—		—		—		1	0
SC Freiburg II	2020–21	Regionalliga Südwest	18	0	—		—		—		18	0
SC Freiburg II	2021–22	3. Liga	24	3	—		—		—		24	3
SC Freiburg II	Total		43	3	—		—		—		43	3
Hannover 96	2022–23	2. Bundesliga	21	0	2	0	—		—		23	0
Hannover 96	2023–24	2. Bundesliga	32	3	0	0	—		—		32	3
Hannover 96	2024–25	2. Bundesliga	33	2	1	0	—		—		34	2
Hannover 96	2025–26	2. Bundesliga	34	3	1	0	—		—		35	3
Hannover 96	Total		120	8	4	0	—		—		124	8
Borussia Mönchengladbach	2026–27	Bundesliga	0	0	1	0	—		—		1	0
Career total			163	11	5	0	0	0	0	0	168	11
