= Stefan Leitl =

German football manager and former player

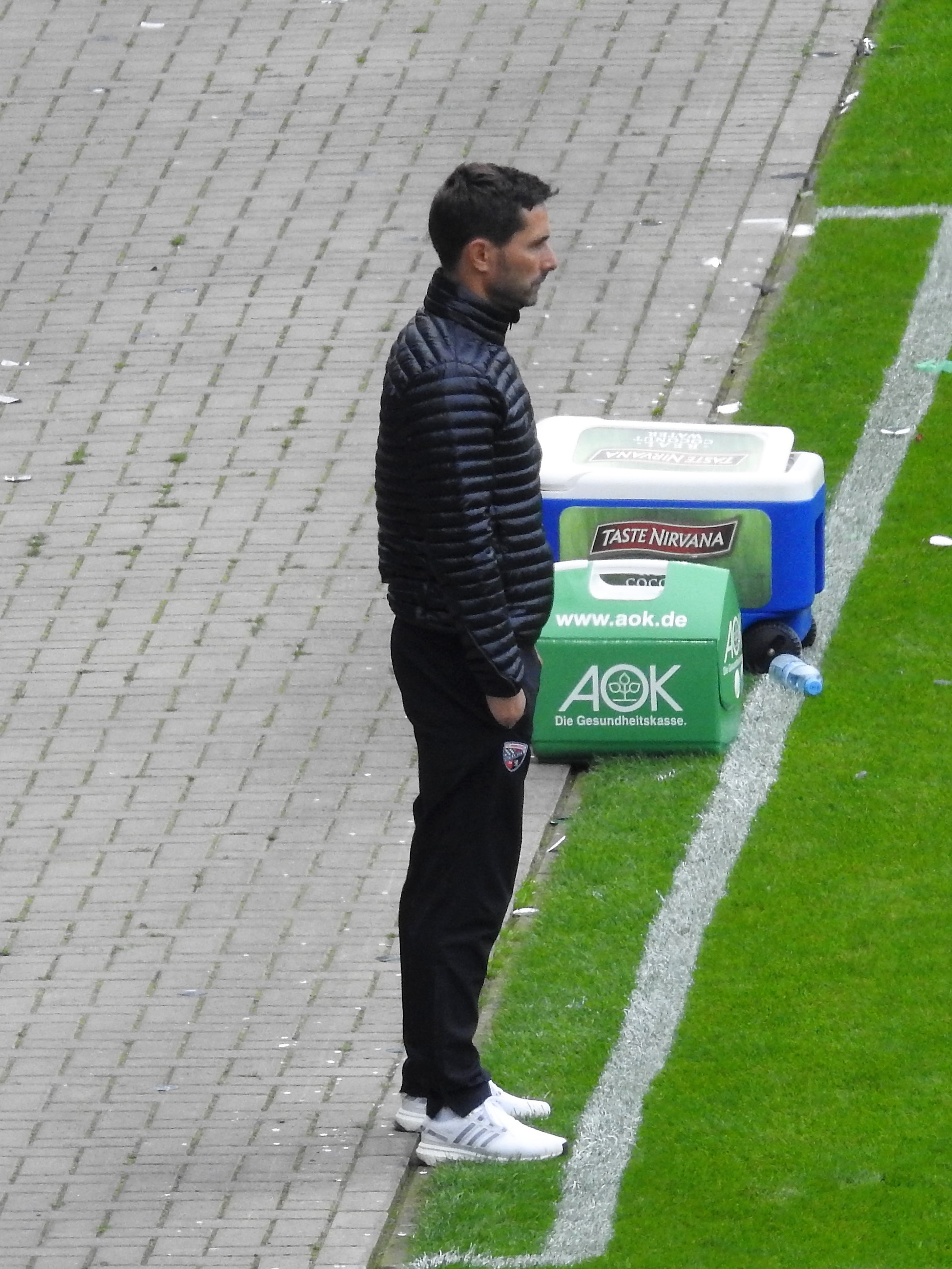
- Leitl in 2017

Personal information
- Date of birth: 29 August 1977 (age 49)
- Place of birth: Munich, West Germany
- Height: 1.78 m (5 ft 10 in)
- Position: Midfielder

Team information
- Current team: Hertha BSC (manager)

Youth career
- FC Ismaning
- Bayern Munich
- –1994: SpVgg Unterhaching
- 1994–1995: Bayern Munich

Senior career*
Years	Team	Apps	(Gls)
1995–1998	Bayern Munich (A)	26	(2)
1996–1998	Bayern Munich	0	(0)
1998–1999	SV Lohhof	32	(6)
1999–2002	1. FC Nürnberg	57	(4)
2002–2004	SpVgg Unterhaching	57	(4)
2004–2007	Darmstadt 98	90	(14)
2007–2013	FC Ingolstadt	182	(43)
Total		444	(73)

International career
1997	Germany U21	2	(0)
1998	Germany Olympic	2	(0)

Managerial career
- 2014–2017: FC Ingolstadt II
- 2017–2018: FC Ingolstadt
- 2019–2022: Greuther Fürth
- 2022–2024: Hannover 96
- 2025–: Hertha BSC
- * Club domestic league appearances and goals

Stefan Leitl (born 29 August 1977) is a German football manager and former player who is the current head coach of Hertha BSC.

He has managed FC Ingolstadt II, FC Ingolstadt and Greuther Fürth. He has played for Bayern Munich (A), SV Lohhof, 1. FC Nürnberg, SpVgg Unterhaching, Darmstadt 98, and FC Ingolstadt.

== Playing career ==
Leitl played as a youth for FC Ismaning, before joining the youth setup of Bayern Munich in 1987. He left the club to join SpVgg Unterhaching, but returned, and began playing for the reserve team in 1995. A year later he was promoted to the senior squad, but did not make any first-team appearances, continuing to play for the reserves in the Regionalliga Süd. In 1998, he left FC Bayern, joining local amateur side SV Lohhof, with whom he won the Oberliga Bayern, securing promotion to the Regionalliga. He left, however, joining 1. FC Nürnberg, then of the 2. Bundesliga.

After two years Nürnberg were promoted to the Bundesliga as champions, where Leitl found his opportunities limited – after just five appearances he left the club half-way through the 2001–02 season, dropping back down a division to return to Unterhaching. He could not prevent them being relegated down to the Regionalliga, but played in 33 of 36 games the following season as they won the title, finishing ahead of Jahn Regensburg on goals scored. Leitl had now been a champion at the top four levels of German football.

The following season Leitl had lost his place, and only played 13 games, mostly as a substitute. He left the club in July 2004, joining Darmstadt, where he spent three seasons in the Regionalliga, leaving in 2007 after the club were relegated. He returned to Bavaria to sign for FC Ingolstadt 04, where he established himself as a key player, captaining the club to promotion as league runners-up. Ingolstadt were relegated after one season, but bounced back in 2010, beating Hansa Rostock in a playoff to return to the 2. Bundesliga.

Leitl started the 2010–11 season with a goal in a DFB-Pokal match against Karlsruher SC, the first goal at Ingolstadt's new Audi Sportpark. He retired at the end of the 2012–13 season.

== Managerial career ==
Leitl was manager of FC Ingolstadt 04 II between 16 September 2014 and 21 August 2017. The first match for Leitl as manager of FC Ingolstadt 04 II was a 4–2 win against Wacker Burghausen on 19 September 2014. FC Ingolstadt 04 II finished the 2014–15 season in fifth place. Ingolstadt II finished the following season in 11th place. Ingolstadt II finished the 2016–17 season in eighth place. His final match for Ingolstadt II was a 2–0 win against 1860 Rosenheim on 18 August 2017 because Leitl replaced Maik Walpurgis on 22 August 2017 as manager of the first team, FC Ingolstadt. He was sacked on 22 September 2018. He finished with a record of 14 wins, 11 draws, and 15 losses.

On 5 February 2019, he was appointed as the new head coach of Greuther Fürth as a replacement for Damir Burić. Under his management, the club finished second in the 2020–21 season of the 2. Bundesliga, and Greuther Fürth gained promotion to the Bundesliga for the second time in the club's history.

On 27 April 2022, Leitl announced that he would leave Greuther Fürth at the end of the 2021–22 season. On 8 May 2022, he was announced as the new head coach for Hannover 96 starting with the 2022–23 season. He was sacked during the winter break in the 2024–25 season.

In February 2025, he was signed by Hertha BSC.

== Managerial record ==
As of matches played on 22 November 2026

Team	From	To	Record					
Team	From	To	G	W	D	L	Win %	Ref.
FC Ingolstadt II	16 September 2014	21 August 2017	97	34	31	32	35.05	
FC Ingolstadt	22 August 2017	22 September 2018	40	14	11	15	35.00	
Greuther Fürth	5 February 2019	30 June 2022	121	37	38	46	30.58	
Hannover 96	1 July 2022	29 December 2024	89	34	25	30	38.20	
Hertha BSC	18 February 2025	present	64	33	17	14	51.56	
Total			411	152	122	137	36.98	—

== Honours ==
- Bundesliga: 1996–97
- DFB-Ligapokal: 1997
- DFB-Pokal: 1997–98
- Oberliga Bayern: 1998–99
- 2. Bundesliga: 2000–01
- Regionalliga Süd: 2002–03
