= Joel Imasuen =

American soccer player (born 2004)

Personal information
- Full name: Joel Victor Imasuen
- Date of birth: October 27, 2004 (age 22)
- Place of birth: Atlanta, United States
- Height: 1.93 m (6 ft 4 in)
- Position: Forward

Team information
- Current team: Schalke 04 II
- Number: 17

Youth career
- SC Staaken
- –2016: Spandauer Kickers
- 2016–2021: Hertha BSC
- 2021–2022: Viktoria Berlin
- 2022–2023: Werder Bremen

Senior career*
Years	Team	Apps	(Gls)
2023–2026	Werder Bremen II	59	(54)
2024	Werder Bremen	1	(0)
2026–	Schalke 04 II	0	(0)
- * Club domestic league appearances and goals as of 1 July 2026

Joel Victor Imasuen (born October 27, 2004) is an American soccer player who plays as a forward for Regionalliga West club Schalke 04 II.

== Career ==
Imasuen joined Bundesliga club Werder Bremen from Viktoria Berlin in 2022. During the 2023–24 season, he mainly played for the club's reserves in the Bremen-Liga. He and teammate Maik Łukowicz fought for the spot as top scorer across all Oberligas, the German fifth tier, having scored 25 and 30 goals, respectively, after 20 matches. On March 21, 2024, Imasuen played for Werder Bremen's first team in a friendly against Hannover 96, scoring his side's only goal in a 3–1 loss. He subsequently trained with the first team. On 30 March 2024, he debuted in the Bundesliga during a 2–0 loss to VfL Wolfsburg. On 9 June 2026, he moved to Schalke 04 II.

== Style of play ==
Imasuen mainly operates as a forward. Werder Bremen's head of professional football Clemens Fritz described him as having an "intense style of play".
