= Maik Łukowicz =

Polish footballer (born 1995)

Personal information
- Date of birth: 1 February 1995 (age 31)
- Place of birth: Bremen, Germany
- Height: 1.88 m (6 ft 2 in)
- Position: Forward

Team information
- Current team: Dibba Al-Hisn

Youth career
- 2001–2014: Werder Bremen

Senior career*
Years	Team	Apps	(Gls)
2014–2016	Werder Bremen II	33	(13)
2015–2016	→ Hansa Rostock (loan)	14	(1)
2016–2018	Eintracht Braunschweig II	46	(10)
2018–2022	VfB Oldenburg	75	(23)
2022–2023	Teutonia Ottensen	29	(15)
2023–2025	Werder Bremen II	61	(66)
2025–2026	Helmond Sport	30	(10)
2026–	Dibba Al-Hisn	0	(0)

International career
2011	Poland U17	2	(0)
2014	Poland U20	2	(0)
- * Club domestic league appearances and goals as of 28 April 2026

Maik Łukowicz (born 1 February 1995) is a professional footballer who plays as a forward for UAE First Division League club Dibba Al-Hisn. Born in Germany, he represented Poland at youth level.

== Club career ==
Born in Bremen, Germany, he began his career in the youth teams of his hometown club Werder Bremen, making his debut in their reserves on 25 April 2014 in a 2–1 home defeat to the reserves of Hannover 96 in the Regionalliga Nord.

The following season, he scored 13 goals in 32 games as they achieved promotion to the 3. Liga. In their 2–2 draw at VfB Lübeck on 26 September 2014, he was accused of doing a Hitler salute, which is a criminal offence in Germany; he was cleared of this accusation by a court the following January. On 23 November 2014, he scored a hat-trick in a 4–3 win over the reserves of Eintracht Braunschweig. After the winter break, he did not net any goals until a 7–0 win against FT Braunschweig on 17 May 2015.

On 28 August 2015, soon after beginning the 3. Liga campaign for Bremen II, Łukowicz was loaned to Hansa Rostock for the remainder of the season.

In August 2016, Łukowicz transferred to the reserve side of Eintracht Braunschweig, playing in the fourth tier Regionalliga Nord

In August 2018, following Braunschweig II's relegation from the Regionalliga Nord, he remained in the division joining VfB Oldenburg.

On 9 August 2022, he joined Teutonia Ottensen, also of the Regionalliga Nord. He scored 15 goals in 29 appearances in the 2022–23 season.

In summer 2023, Łukowicz returned to former club Werder Bremen, where he was assigned to the club's reserves, playing in the fifth-tier Bremen-Liga. During the 2023–24 season he and teammate Joel Imasuen fought for the spot as top scorer across all Oberligas, having scored 30 (Łukowicz) and 25 goals (Imasuen) after 20 matches. In the 2024–25 season he scored 16 goals and made 6 assists in the Regionalliga Nord, also being selected for the first-team squad in the Bundesliga once.

In May 2025 it was announced that Łukowicz would move to Dutch club Helmond Sport, playing in the Eerste Divisie, for the 2025–26 season. He signed a one-year contract with the option of a further year.

On 15 July 2026, Łukowicz signed with Emirati second-tier club Dibba Al-Hisn.

== International career ==
Born in Germany, Łukowicz also holds a Polish passport. He represented the Poland under-20 team as they won the 2014–15 Four Nations tournament, concluding with a 2–1 win over Germany in Jena.
