= Phil Neumann =

German footballer (born 1997)

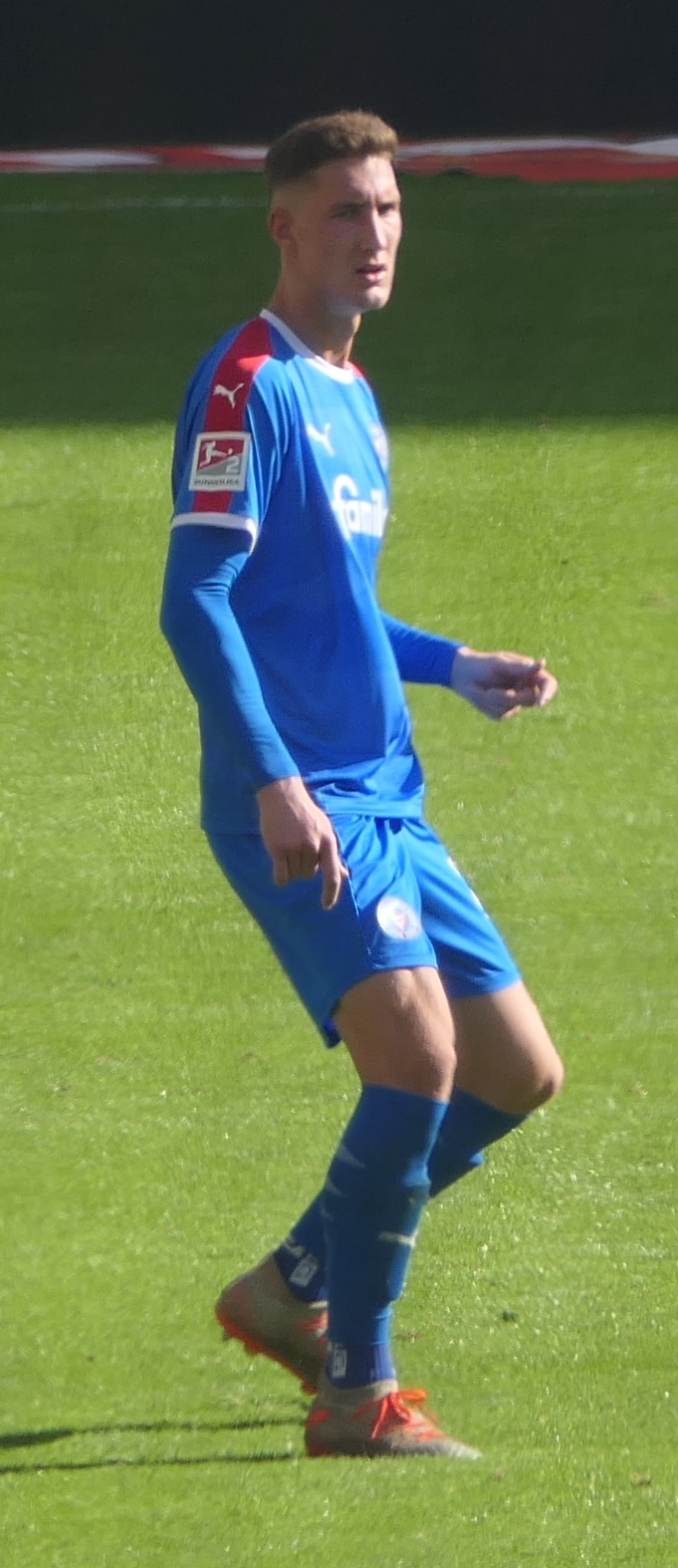
- Neumann with Holstein Kiel in 2019

Personal information
- Full name: Phil Yannik Neumann
- Date of birth: 8 July 1997 (age 29)
- Place of birth: Recklinghausen, Germany
- Height: 1.91 m (6 ft 3 in)
- Position: Centre-back

Team information
- Current team: Birmingham City
- Number: 5

Youth career
- 2002–2005: DJK SpVgg Herten
- 2005–2016: Schalke 04

Senior career*
Years	Team	Apps	(Gls)
2016–2017	Schalke 04 II	15	(1)
2017–2019	FC Ingolstadt II	5	(0)
2017–2019	FC Ingolstadt	24	(1)
2019–2022	Holstein Kiel	72	(0)
2022–2025	Hannover 96	94	(5)
2025–	Birmingham City	43	(5)

International career
2016	Germany U19	4	(1)
2017	Germany U20	3	(0)
- * Club domestic league appearances and goals as of 24 October 2026 (UTC)

Phil Yannik Neumann (born 8 July 1997) is a German professional footballer who plays as a centre-back for EFL Championship club Birmingham City. He previously played for FC Ingolstadt 04, Holstein Kiel and Hannover 96.

== Career ==
=== Early career ===
Phil Neumann was born in Herten in the Ruhr area in North Rhine-Westphalia and started his football career at DJK SpVgg Herten. He moved to the youth academy of FC Schalke 04 when he was 7. For the 2016–17 season, he was promoted to the reserve team at fourth-tier Regionalliga West and made 15 appearances (one goal).

=== Ingolstadt ===
Afterwards, Neumann joined FC Ingolstadt 04, which was relegated from the Bundesliga. In his first year in Bavaria, he was not a regular player and Ingolstadt finished 9th place. In his the second year, FC Ingolstadt 04 struggled and fought against relegation to 3. Liga. The club won the relegation play-offs against SV Wehen Wiesbaden and won 2–1 in the first-leg, but after a 2–3 defeat in the second-leg, the Bavarians were relegated to the third division. Phil Neumann played 20 matches and in both matches at relegation/promotion play-offs.

=== Holstein Kiel ===
In June 2019, Holstein Kiel announced the signing of Phil Neumann. He was played often in his first season in Northern Germany and was also often a part of the starting line-up. In the second year, Neumann achieved with the club from Kiel, the capital of the federal state of Schleswig-Holstein, the semi-final of German Cup and did sent-off Bayern Munich in the second round after penalty shoot-out. In the semi-final, Holstein Kiel was knocked-out by Borussia Dortmund. Phil Neumann did played only against the Dortmund-based. In the championship, Holstein Kiel was holds an automatic promotion spot for Bundesliga, but lost the last matches against Karlsruher SC and SV Darmstadt 98 and must going to the promotion/relegation play-offs against Cologne. Holstein Kiel was did won 1–0 in the first-leg, but lost 1–5 in the second-leg and missed the promotion to the top-flight of Germany. Holstein Kiel struggled in the next season against relegation to 3. Liga, but finished in 9th place.

=== Hannover 96 ===
On 5 May 2022, Neumann signed a 3 year pre-contract agreement with Hannover 96, joining ahead of the 2022-23 season. Hannover's sporting director Marcus Mann said on his arrival, "With Phil Neumann, we're getting a tall and extremely fast central defender into the team. At 24, he's certainly not finished with his development yet. His age, character, and athletic profile make him a great fit for our planned future."

=== Birmingham City ===
On 17 January 2025, Neumann signed a pre-contract agreement to join Birmingham City, arriving in July after the club had secured promotion back to the Championship. He suffered a swollen ankle in pre-season but recovered to establish himself in the side and on 21 October 2025, scored his first goal for Birmingham, a header that earned a 1–0 away win over Preston North End. He scored again with a header in a 1–1 draw at home to Southampton on 29 December 2025.

== Career statistics ==
As of match played 29 December 2025

Appearances and goals by club, season and competition
Club	Season	League			National cup (Note: Includes DFB-Pokal, FA Cup)		League cup (Note: Includes EFL Cup)		Other		Total	
Club	Season	Division	Apps	Goals	Apps	Goals	Apps	Goals	Apps	Goals	Apps	Goals
Schalke 04 II	2016–17	Regionalliga West	15	1	—		—		—		15	1
FC Ingolstadt II	2017–18	Regionalliga Bayern	4	0	—		—		—		4	0
FC Ingolstadt II	2018–19	Regionalliga Bayern	1	0	—		—		—		1	0
FC Ingolstadt II	Total		5	0	—		—		—		5	0
FC Ingolstadt	2017–18	2. Bundesliga	4	0	1	0	—		—		5	0
FC Ingolstadt	2018–19	2. Bundesliga	20	1	0	0	—		2 (Note: Appearances in 2. Bundesliga relegation play-offs)	0	22	1
FC Ingolstadt	Total		24	1	1	0	—		2	0	27	1
Holstein Kiel	2019–20	2. Bundesliga	25	0	2	0	—		—		27	0
Holstein Kiel	2020–21	2. Bundesliga	18	0	1	0	—		2 (Note: Appearances in 2. Bundesliga Promotion play-offs)	0	21	0
Holstein Kiel	2021–22	2. Bundesliga	29	0	2	1	—		—		31	1
Holstein Kiel	Total		72	0	5	1	—		2	0	79	1
Hannover 96	2022–23	2. Bundesliga	29	1	2	0	—		—		31	0
Hannover 96	2023–24	2. Bundesliga	32	2	1	0	—		—		33	2
Hannover 96	2024–25	2. Bundesliga	33	2	1	0	—		—		34	2
Hannover 96	Total		94	5	4	0	—		2	0	98	4
Birmingham City	2025–26	EFL Championship	18	2	0	0	1	0	—		19	2
Career total			228	9	10	1	1	0	4	0	243	10
