= Maximilian Beier =

German footballer (born 2002)

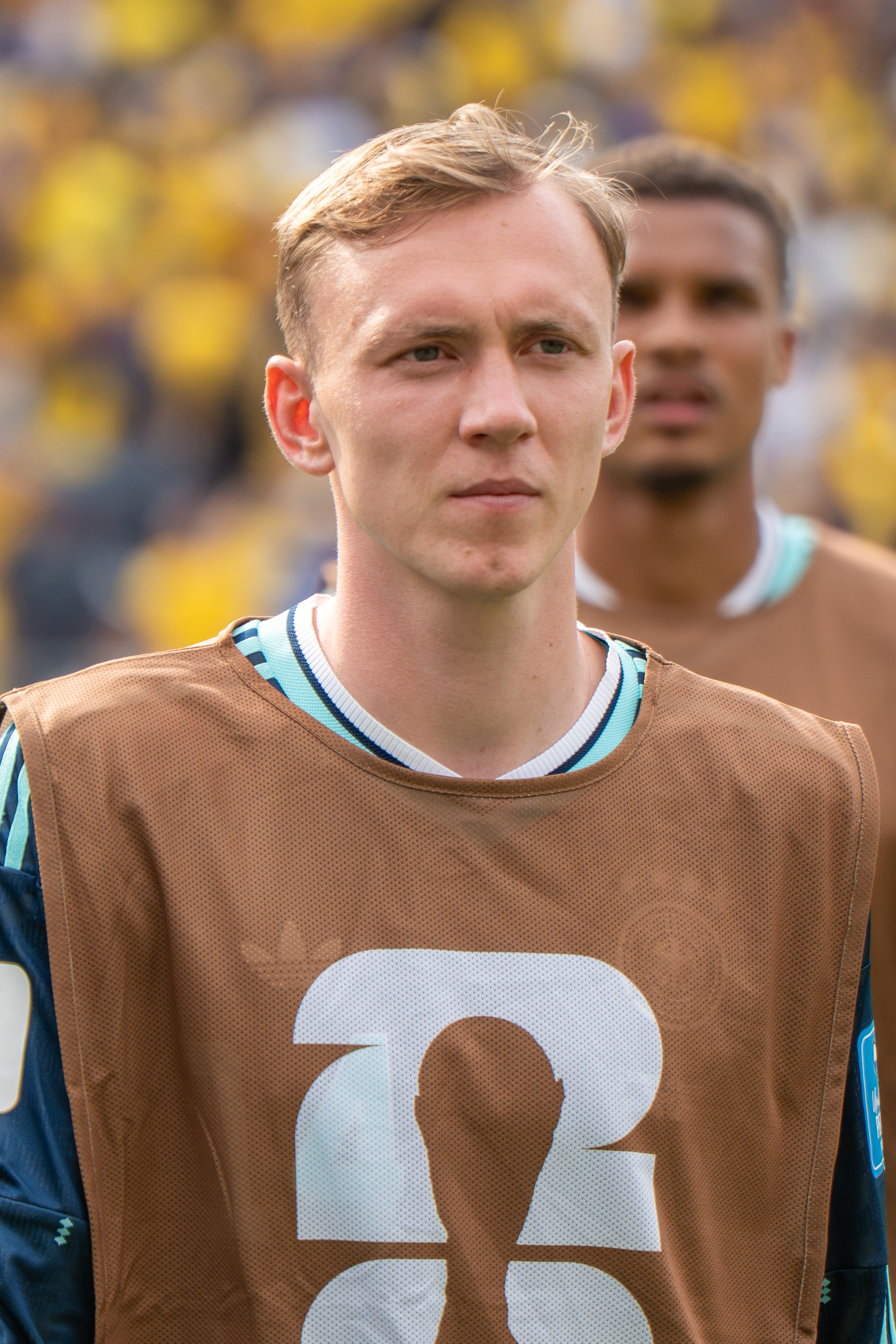
- Beier with Germany in 2026

Personal information
- Full name: Maximilian Beier
- Date of birth: 17 October 2002 (age 24)
- Place of birth: Brandenburg an der Havel, Germany
- Height: 1.85 m (6 ft 1 in)
- Positions: Left winger; left wing-back; forward

Team information
- Current team: Borussia Dortmund
- Number: 14

Youth career
- 2014–2015: Brandenburger SC Süd
- 2015–2018: Energie Cottbus
- 2018–2020: TSG Hoffenheim

Senior career*
Years	Team	Apps	(Gls)
2020–2024	TSG Hoffenheim II	25	(10)
2020–2024	TSG Hoffenheim	42	(16)
2021–2023	→ Hannover 96 (loan)	63	(10)
2024–	Borussia Dortmund	69	(19)

International career^{‡}
2019	Germany U17	7	(1)
2021–2023	Germany U20	7	(0)
2023–2025	Germany U21	8	(5)
2024–	Germany	10	(0)
- * Club domestic league appearances and goals as of 31 October 2026 ‡ National team caps and goals as of 22:15, 25 June 2026 (UTC)

Maximilian "Maxi" Beier (German: [maksɪˈmiːli̯an ˈbaɪ̯ɐ]; born 17 October 2002) is a German professional footballer who plays as a left winger or left wing-back for Bundesliga club Borussia Dortmund and the Germany national team.

== Club career ==
=== TSG Hoffenheim ===
==== 2020–21: Professional debut ====
Beier started playing football for Brandenburger SC Süd, then moved to Energie Cottbus, almost quitting football because of homesickness. Beier moved to TSG Hoffenheim at the age of 15, where he made his professional debut in the Bundesliga in a 1–0 defeat against Freiburg on 8 February 2020, coming on in the 88th minute for Robert Skov. Later that year, on 10 December, he recorded his first goals by scoring twice and providing an assist in a 4–1 win against Gent in the Europa League.

==== 2021–2023: Loan to Hannover 96 ====
On 19 August 2021, Beier was loaned out to Hannover 96 for one season. The loan was extended for the 2022–23 season on 8 June 2022.

==== 2023–24: Return to Hoffenheim and breakthrough ====
He returned to Hoffenheim for the 2023–24 season, and became the club's top scorer, netting 16 goals across 33 games.

=== Borussia Dortmund ===
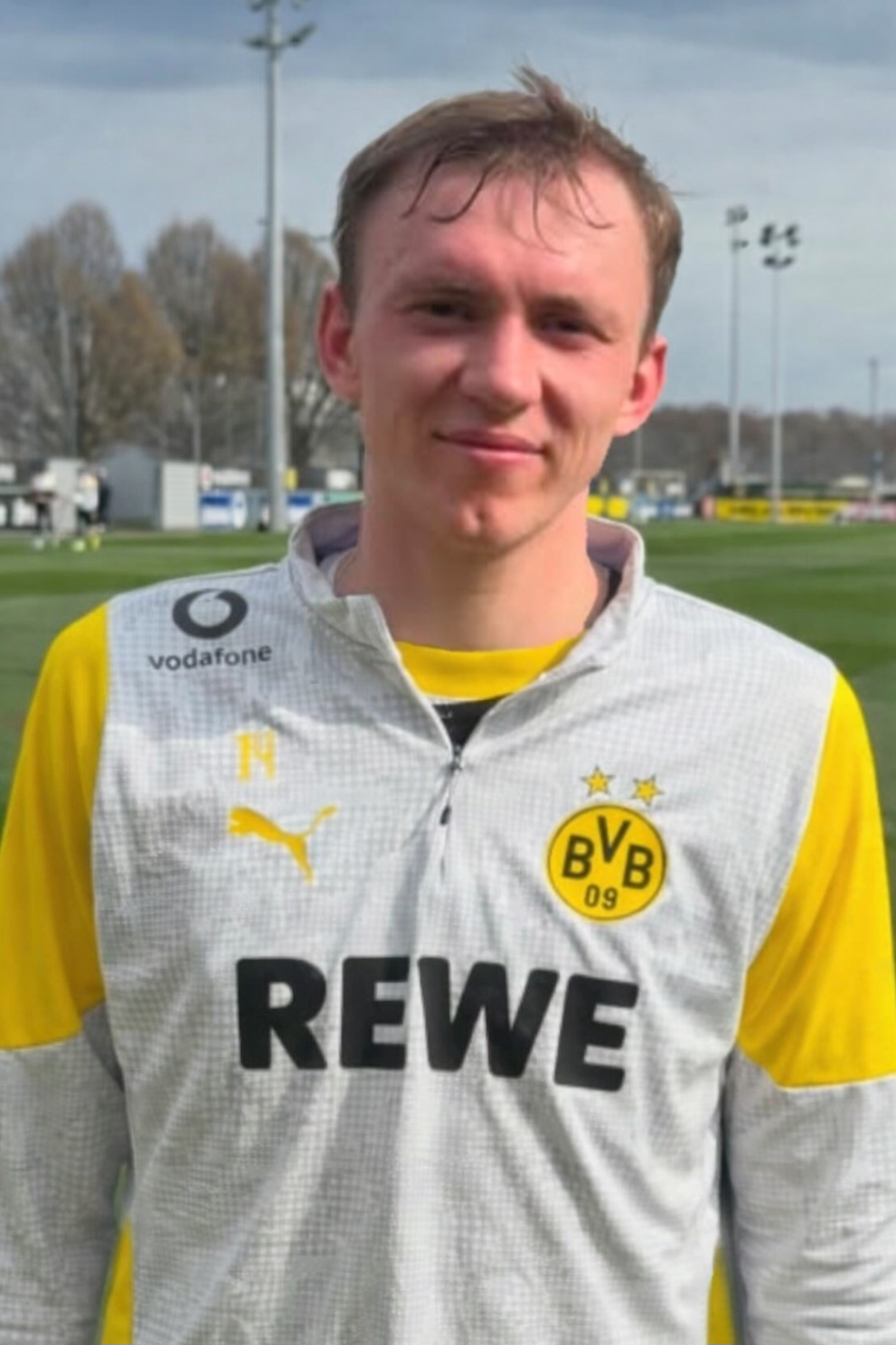
Beier with Borussia Dortmund in 2026

On 12 August 2024, Beier joined fellow Bundesliga side Borussia Dortmund, signing a five-year contract. Beier made his debut in the DFB Pokal on 17 August 2024. On 12 March 2025, Beier scored his first UEFA Champions League goal in the second leg of the Round of 16 matchup against Lille to push the aggregate to 3–2 and propel Dortmund into the quarterfinals of the 2024–25 UEFA Champions League campaign. He ended his first season at Dortmund with ten goals scored across the Bundesliga, Champions League and Club World Cup. In the following season, he'd help side finish runner-up in the league, registering ten goals and assists each in all competitions, earning a call-up to the 2026 FIFA World Cup.

== International career ==
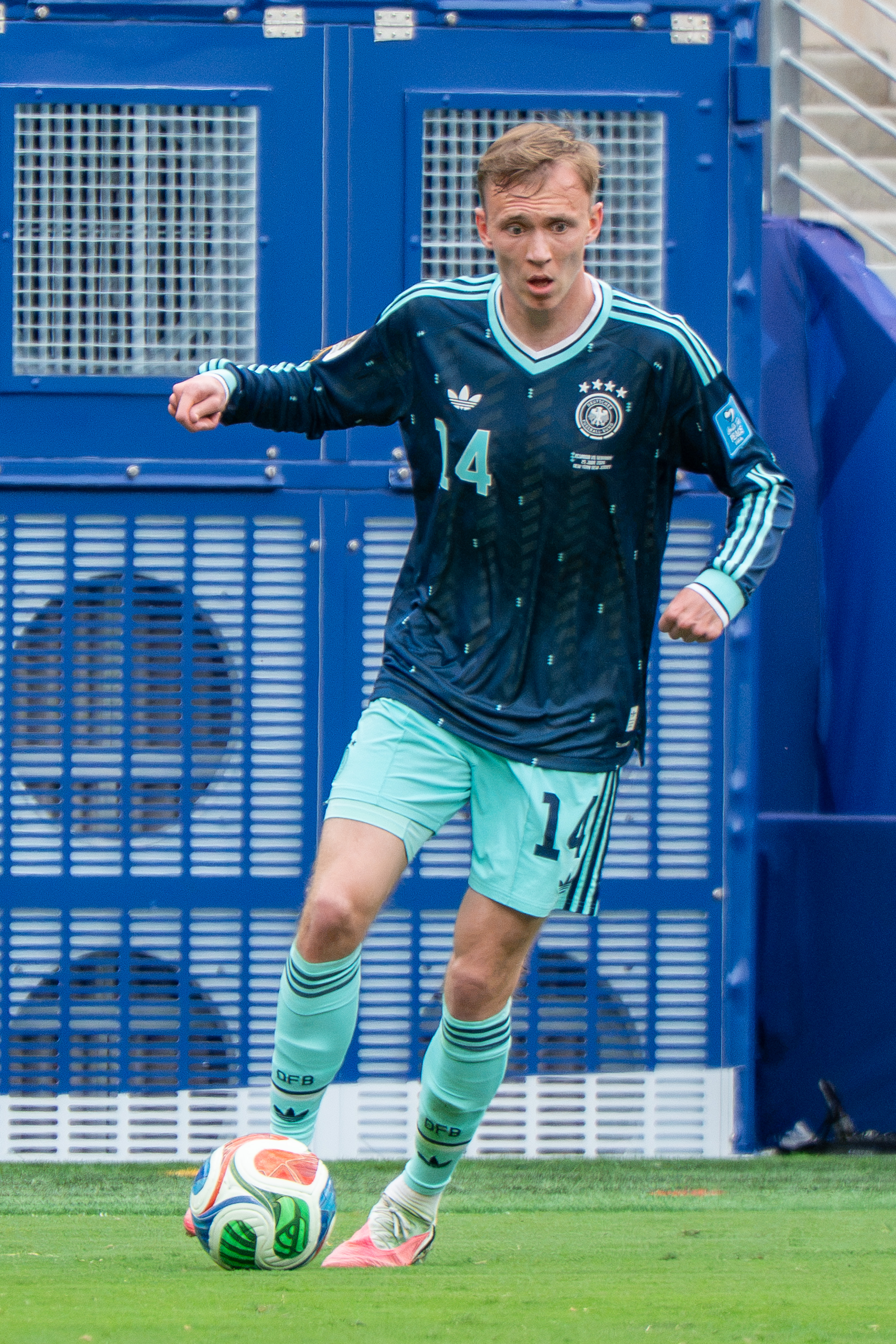
Beier playing for Germany at the 2026 FIFA World Cup

Beier was a youth international footballer for Germany. In March 2024, he was called up for the Germany national team ahead of the friendly matches against France and the Netherlands.

He was named in Germany's squad for the UEFA Euro 2024. On 3 June, he made his senior debut in a friendly match against Ukraine prior to the tournament. Beier made one appearance across the tournament, playing 26 minutes after replacing Robert Andrich in a 1–1 draw against Switzerland. Germany was knocked out by Spain in the quarter-finals. On 21 May 2026, he'd be called up to Germany's final squad ahead of the FIFA World Cup.

== Career statistics ==
=== Club ===
As of match played 31 October 2026

Appearances and goals by club, season and competition
Club	Season	League			DFB-Pokal		Europe		Other		Total	
Club	Season	Division	Apps	Goals	Apps	Goals	Apps	Goals	Apps	Goals	Apps	Goals
TSG Hoffenheim	2019–20	Bundesliga	6	0	0	0	0	0	—		6	0
TSG Hoffenheim	2020–21	Bundesliga	3	0	0	0	2 (Note: Appearances in UEFA Europa League)	2	—		5	2
TSG Hoffenheim	2023–24	Bundesliga	33	16	2	0	—		—		35	16
TSG Hoffenheim	Total		42	16	2	0	2	2	—		46	18
TSG Hoffenheim II	2020–21	Regionalliga Südwest	24	9	—		—		—		24	9
TSG Hoffenheim II	2021–22	Regionalliga Südwest	1	1	—		—		—		1	1
TSG Hoffenheim II	Total		25	10	—		—		—		25	10
Hannover 96 (loan)	2021–22	2. Bundesliga	30	3	3	4	—		—		33	7
Hannover 96 (loan)	2022–23	2. Bundesliga	33	7	2	1	—		—		35	8
Hannover 96 (loan)	Total		63	10	5	5	—		—		68	15
Borussia Dortmund	2024–25	Bundesliga	29	8	2	0	12 (Note: Appearances in UEFA Champions League)	1	3 (Note: Appearances in FIFA Club World Cup)	1	46	10
Borussia Dortmund	2025–26	Bundesliga	32	9	3	0	9	1	—		44	10
Borussia Dortmund	2026–27	Bundesliga	8	2	2	0	3	0	1 (Note: Appearance in Franz Beckenbauer Supercup)	0	14	2
Borussia Dortmund	Total		69	19	7	0	24	2	4	1	104	22
Career total			196	52	14	5	26	4	4	1	240	52

=== International ===
As of match played 25 June 2026

Appearances and goals by national team and year
National team	Year	Apps	Goals
Germany	2024	4	0
Germany	2025	3	0
Germany	2026	3	0
Total		10	0

== Honours ==
Individual

- Bundesliga Rookie of the Month: February 2024, March 2024
