= Sei Muroya =

Japanese footballer

Sei Muroya 室屋 成
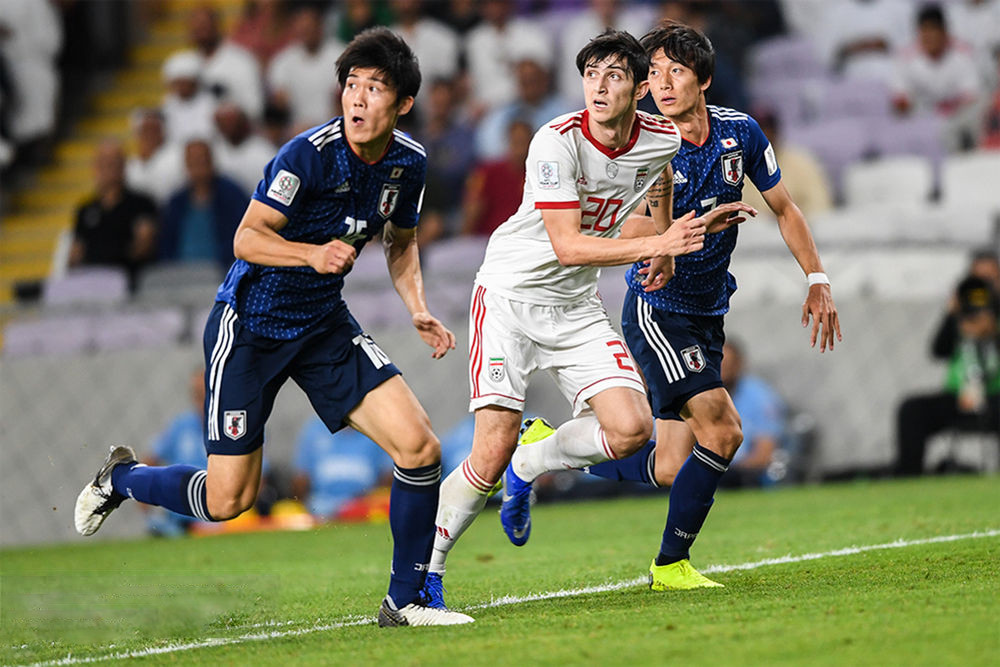
- Muroya (right, 2019)

Personal information
- Date of birth: 5 April 1994 (age 32)
- Place of birth: Kumatori, Osaka, Japan
- Height: 1.76 m (5 ft 9 in)
- Position: Right-back

Team information
- Current team: FC Tokyo
- Number: 2

Youth career
- Sessel Kumatori
- 2010–2012: Aomori Yamada High School

College career
Years	Team	Apps	(Gls)
2013–2015	Meiji University		

Senior career*
Years	Team	Apps	(Gls)
2016–2020	FC Tokyo	108	(2)
2016–2017	FC Tokyo U-23	5	(0)
2020–2025	Hannover 96	142	(5)
2025–	FC Tokyo	7	(0)

International career^{‡}
2011	Japan U17	4	(0)
2012–2014	Japan U19	2	(0)
2015–2016	Japan U23	2	(0)
2017–	Japan	16	(0)
Medal record
Representing Japan
AFC Asian Cup
Silver medal – second place	2019 United Arab Emirates
AFC U-23 Championship
Gold medal – first place	2016 Qatar
- * Club domestic league appearances and goals as of 13 September 2025 ‡ National team caps and goals as of 7 September 2021

Sei Muroya (室屋 成, Muroya Sei; born 5 April 1994) is a Japanese professional footballer who plays as a right-back for FC Tokyo in the J1 League and for the Japan national team.

== Club career ==
Muroya was born in Osaka. He joined FC Tokyo in 2016 and made his league debut against Ventforet Kofu on 9 July 2016.

In August 2020, Muroya joined German club Hannover 96. He returned to FC Tokyo in 2025.

== International career ==
In June 2011, Muroya was elected Japan U-17 national team for 2011 U-17 World Cup and he played four matches. He has been a member of the Japan national U-23 team since 2015. Muroya was member of Japan U23 team for 2016 AFC U-23 Championship in Qatar and he won the championship. On 1 July 2016, Muroya was called up for the 2016 Summer Olympics.

== Career statistics ==
=== Club ===
As of 1 July 2025

Appearances and goals by club, season and competition
Club	Season	League			National Cup		League Cup		Continental		Total	
Club	Season	Division	Apps	Goals	Apps	Goals	Apps	Goals	Apps	Goals	Apps	Goals
FC Tokyo U-23	2016	J3 League	4	0	–		–		–		4	0
FC Tokyo U-23	2017	J3 League	1	0	–		–		–		1	0
FC Tokyo U-23	Total		5	0	0	0	0	0	0	0	5	0
FC Tokyo	2016	J1 League	12	0	2	1	4	0	7	0	25	1
FC Tokyo	2017	J1 League	26	0	0	0	6	1	–		32	1
FC Tokyo	2018	J1 League	30	1	3	0	1	0	–		34	1
FC Tokyo	2019	J1 League	30	0	–		6	0	–		36	0
FC Tokyo	2020	J1 League	10	1	–		–		3	1	13	2
FC Tokyo	Total		108	2	5	1	17	1	10	1	140	5
Hannover 96	2020–21	2. Bundesliga	32	0	2	0	–		–		34	0
Hannover 96	2021–22	2. Bundesliga	27	0	3	0	–		–		30	0
Hannover 96	2022–23	2. Bundesliga	31	3	2	0	–		–		33	3
Hannover 96	2023–24	2. Bundesliga	25	2	1	0	–		–		26	2
Hannover 96	2024–25	2. Bundesliga	27	0	1	0	–		–		28	0
Hannover 96	Total		142	5	9	0	0	0	0	0	151	5
FC Tokyo	2025	J1 League	0	0	0	0	0	0	–		0	0
Career total			255	7	14	1	17	1	10	1	296	10

=== International ===
As of 7 September 2021

Appearances and goals by national team and year
National team	Year	Apps	Goals
Japan	2017	1	0
Japan	2018	3	0
Japan	2019	6	0
Japan	2020	2	0
Japan	2021	4	0
Total		16	0

== Honours ==
Japan

- AFC Asian Cup runner-up: 2019

Japan U23

- AFC U-23 Championship: 2016

Individual

- J.League Best XI: 2019
- J1 100 Year Vision League Regional Round East Best Eleven: 2026
