= 2019–20 Hannover 96 season =

Hannover 96
2019–20 season
- President: Martin Kind
- Manager: Mirko Slomka (until 3 November); Asif Šarić (interim; 4–14 November); Kenan Kocak (from 14 November)
- Stadium: HDI-Arena
- 2. Bundesliga: 6th
- DFB-Pokal: First round
- Top goalscorer: League: Marvin Ducksch (15); All: Marvin Ducksch (15)
- Highest home attendance: 49,000
- Lowest home attendance: Pre-spectatorless matches: (Note: All five home matches played in May and June 2020 have been played behind closed doors without any spectators.); 22,100
- Average home league attendance: 21,247 (Note: The average league attendance was 30,100 after twelve home matches prior to fixtures being played behind closed doors.)
- Biggest win: Hannover 4–0 St. Pauli
- Biggest defeat: Hannover 0–4 Nürnberg; Heidenheim 4–0 Hannover
Home colours	Away colours	Third colours

The 2019–20 Hannover 96 season was the 124th season in the football club's history and 24th overall season in the second flight of German football, the 2. Bundesliga, having been relegated from the Bundesliga in the previous season. Hannover 96 also are participating in this season's edition of the domestic cup, the DFB-Pokal. This is the 61st season for Hannover in the HDI-Arena, located in Hanover, Lower Saxony, Germany. The season covers a period from 1 July 2019 to 30 June 2020.

On 12 March 2020, all players were quarantined for 14 days after Timo Hübers and Jannes Horn were tested positive for COVID-19.

== Players ==
=== Squad information ===
As of 9 February 2020

Note: Flags indicate national team as defined under FIFA eligibility rules; some limited exceptions apply. Players may hold more than one non-FIFA nationality.

No.	Pos.	Nation	Player
1	GK	GER	Ron-Robert Zieler
2	DF	CRO	Josip Elez
3	DF	CHI	Miiko Albornoz
4	DF	GER	Julian Korb
5	DF	BRA	Felipe
6	MF	GER	Marvin Bakalorz (captain)
7	MF	GER	Edgar Prib (vice-captain)
9	FW	SWE	John Guidetti (on loan from Alavés)
10	MF	JPN	Genki Haraguchi
11	MF	GER	Linton Maina
13	MF	GER	Dominik Kaiser
15	DF	GER	Timo Hübers
16	FW	USA	Sebastian Soto
17	FW	GER	Marvin Ducksch
18	MF	GER	Marc Stendera

No.	Pos.	Nation	Player
20	MF	GER	Philipp Ochs
21	DF	GER	Jannes Horn (on loan from 1. FC Köln)
22	DF	GER	Matthias Ostrzolek
23	GK	GER	Michael Ratajczak
24	DF	GER	Sebastian Jung
25	GK	DEN	Martin Hansen
26	FW	GER	Hendrik Weydandt
28	DF	GER	Marcel Franke
29	MF	GER	Simon Stehle
31	DF	GER	Waldemar Anton
33	FW	GER	Cedric Teuchert (on loan from Schalke 04)
34	MF	GER	Niklas Tarnat
35	MF	KOS	Florent Muslija
37	FW	GER	Justin Neiß
40	FW	GER	Marco Stefandl

=== Out on loan ===
Note: Flags indicate national team as defined under FIFA eligibility rules; some limited exceptions apply. Players may hold more than one non-FIFA nationality.

No.	Pos.	Nation	Player
19	FW	SWE	Emil Hansson (on loan to RKC Waalwijk until 30 June 2020)
30	GK	GER	Leo Weinkauf (on loan to MSV Duisburg until 30 June 2021)

=== Transfers ===
==== In ====
No.	Pos	Player	From	Type	Window	Ends	Fee	Source
1	GK	(Germany) Ron-Robert Zieler	(Germany) VfB Stuttgart	Transfer	Summer	30 June 2023	€750,000	
13	GK	(Germany) Philipp Tschauner	(Germany) FC Ingolstadt	Return from loan	Summer	30 June 2020	–	
17	FW	(Germany) Marvin Ducksch	(Germany) Fortuna Düsseldorf	Transfer	Summer	30 June 2022	€1.75 million	
18	MF	(Germany) Marc Stendera	(Germany) Eintracht Frankfurt	Transfer	Summer	30 June 2020	Free	
19	FW	(Sweden) Emil Hansson	(Netherlands) Feyenoord	Transfer	Summer	30 June 2022	€600,000	
20	DF	(Germany) Dennis Aogo	Free agent	Transfer	Summer	30 June 2020	–	
21	DF	(Germany) Jannes Horn	(Germany) 1. FC Köln	Loan	Summer	30 June 2020	€200,000	
24	DF	(Germany) Sebastian Jung	(Germany) VfL Wolfsburg	Transfer	Summer	30 June 2020	Free	
28	DF	(Germany) Marcel Franke	(England) Norwich City	Transfer	Summer	30 June 2022	€500,000	
33	FW	(Germany) Cedric Teuchert	(Germany) Schalke 04	Loan	Summer	30 June 2020	Free	
–	MF	(Germany) Mike-Steven Bähre	(England) Barnsley	Return from loan	Summer	30 June 2020	–	
–	MF	(Germany) Manuel Schmiedebach	(Germany) Union Berlin	Return from loan	Summer	30 June 2020	–	
9	FW	(Sweden) John Guidetti	(Spain) Alavés	Loan	Winter	30 June 2020	Free	
13	MF	(Germany) Dominik Kaiser	(Denmark) Brøndby	Transfer	Winter	30 June 2022	€400,000	
20	MF	(Germany) Philipp Ochs	(Germany) 1899 Hoffenheim	Transfer	Winter	30 June 2022	Free	
23	GK	(Germany) Michael Ratajczak	(Germany) SC Paderborn	Transfer	Winter	30 June 2021	Free	
25	GK	(Denmark) Martin Hansen	(Norway) Strømsgodset	Transfer	Winter	30 June 2021	Free	

==== Out ====
No.	Pos	Player	To	Type	Window	Fee	Source
8	MF	(Brazil) Walace	(Italy) Udinese	Transfer	Summer	€6 million	
9	FW	(Brazil) Jonathas	Free agent	Contract terminated	Summer	–	
11	FW	(Japan) Takuma Asano	(England) Arsenal	End of loan	Summer	–	
13	FW	(Togo) Ihlas Bebou	(Germany) 1899 Hoffenheim	Transfer	Summer	€8.5 million	
13	FW	(Germany) Philipp Tschauner	(Germany) RB Leipzig	Transfer	Summer	€200,000	
14	DF	(Germany) Kevin Akpoguma	(Germany) 1899 Hoffenheim	End of loan	Summer	–	
17	FW	(United States) Bobby Wood	(Germany) Hamburger SV	End of loan	Summer	–	
18	MF	(Norway) Iver Fossum	(Denmark) AaB	Transfer	Summer	Free	
19	GK	(Austria) Samuel Şahin-Radlinger	(England) Barnsley	End of contract	Summer	–	
21	FW	(Germany) Nicolai Müller	(Germany) Eintracht Frankfurt	End of loan	Summer	–	
24	FW	(Germany) Niclas Füllkrug	(Germany) Werder Bremen	Transfer	Summer	€6.5 million	
25	DF	(Germany) Oliver Sorg	(Germany) 1. FC Nürnberg	End of contract	Summer	–	
27	MF	(Switzerland) Pirmin Schwegler	(Australia) Western Sydney Wanderers	Transfer	Summer	Free	
28	DF	(Austria) Kevin Wimmer	(England) Stoke City	End of loan	Summer	–	
30	GK	(Germany) Leo Weinkauf	(Germany) MSV Duisburg	Loan	Summer	Free	
33	FW	(Denmark) Uffe Bech	(Greece) Panathinaikos	End of contract	Summer	–	
34	MF	(Germany) Tim Dierßen	Free agent	End of contract	Summer	–	
36	DF	(United States) Chris Gloster	(Netherlands) PSV Eindhoven	Transfer	Summer	€300,000	
37	FW	(Nigeria) Noah Sarenren Bazee	(Germany) FC Augsburg	Transfer	Summer	€1.7 million	
38	FW	(Germany) Tom Baller	(Germany) Holstein Kiel II	End of contract	Summer	–	
39	FW	(Germany) Yousef Emghames	Free agent	End of contract	Summer	–	
–	MF	(Germany) Mike-Steven Bähre	(England) Barnsley	Transfer	Summer	€150,000	
–	MF	(Germany) Manuel Schmiedebach	(Germany) Union Berlin	Transfer	Summer	Free	
19	FW	(Sweden) Emil Hansson	(Netherlands) RKC Waalwijk	Loan	Winter	Free	
20	DF	(Germany) Dennis Aogo	Free agent	Contract terminated	Winter	–	
23	GK	(Germany) Michael Esser	(Germany) 1899 Hoffenheim	Transfer	Winter	Free	

== Friendly matches ==
Win Draw Loss Void

22 June 2019 Friendly	Mellendorfer TV	0–6	Hannover 96	Wedemark
15:30 CEST (UTC+2)		Report	Jonathas 10', 39'; Maina 12'; Albornoz 33'; Weydandt 64'; Marusenko 71'	Stadium: MTV-Sportpark; Attendance: 1,975; Referee: Jan Tschirschwitz

23 June 2019 Friendly	TSV Bemerode	1–6	Hannover 96	Hanover
15:30 CEST (UTC+2)	Lindemann 60'	Report	Fossum 5'; Weydandt 13', 14', 57'; Albornoz 26'; Jonathas 85'	Stadium: TSV-Sportplatz; Attendance: 1,896; Referee: Björn Behrens

28 June 2019 Friendly	1. FC Wunstorf	0–4	Hannover 96	Wunstorf
18:00 CEST (UTC+2)		Report	Weydandt 1', 44'; Muslija 24'; Hadžić 81'	Stadium: Barne-Arena; Attendance: 2,000; Referee: Marius Schlüwe

29 June 2019 Friendly	Lüneburger SK Hansa	2–3	Hannover 96	Uelzen
16:30 CEST (UTC+2)	Şen 34', 78' (pen.)	Report	Jonathas 41'; Soto 47'; Hadžić 67'	Stadium: Sportplatz Fischerhof; Attendance: 1,087; Referee: André Schönheit

6 July 2019 Friendly	TSV Hartberg	2–0	Hannover 96	Greinbach, Austria
18:00 CEST (UTC+2)	Rep 54', 79'	Report		Stadium: Sportplatz TuS Greinbach

7 July 2019 Friendly	Hannover 96	2–1	Rostov	Loipersdorf, Austria
16:00 CEST (UTC+2)	Weydandt 3'; Muslija 51'	Report	Eremenko 70'	Stadium: Waldstadion Dietersdorf
Note: The match lasted for 1×60 and 1×45 minutes.

10 July 2019 Friendly	Grazer AK	1–3	Hannover 96	Graz, Austria
18:30 CEST (UTC+2)	Hackinger 31'	Report	Soto 52', 76'; Prib 57'	Stadium: Sportzentrum Graz-Weinzödl

13 July 2019 Friendly	Hansa Rostock	0–0	Hannover 96	Rostock
15:00 CEST (UTC+2)		Report		Stadium: Ostseestadion; Attendance: 5,600; Referee: Christian Allwardt

17 July 2019 Friendly	Hannoverscher SC	0–4	Hannover 96	Hanover
18:30 CEST (UTC+2)		Report	Weydandt 5'; Bakalorz 23'; Teuchert 28'; Soto 65'	Stadium: VW Podbi Sportpark; Attendance: 2,380; Referee: Mario Birnstiel

20 July 2019 Friendly	Hannover 96	0–1	Groningen	Hanover
15:00 CEST (UTC+2)		Report	Sierhuis 11'	Stadium: Eilenriedestadion; Attendance: 1,600; Referee: Johann Pfeifer

5 September 2019 Friendly	Hannover 96	0–1	Werder Bremen	Hanover
15:30 CEST (UTC+2)		Report	Pizarro 38'	Stadium: Eilenriedestadion; Attendance: 0
Note: The match lasted for 2×30 minutes.

25 September 2019 Friendly	TSV Havelse	1–6	Hannover 96	Garbsen
18:30 CEST (UTC+2)	Plume 15'	Report	Muslija 4', 51'; Ducksch 58', 85'; Soto 61'; Prib 87'	Stadium: Wilhelm-Langrehr-Stadion; Referee: Markus Büsing

10 October 2019 Friendly	Hannover 96	1–2	Arminia Bielefeld	Hanover
18:00 CEST (UTC+2)	Weydandt 54'	Report	Schipplock 10'; Klos 30'	Stadium: Eilenriedestadion; Referee: Thomas Gorniak

11 January 2020 Friendly	Hannover 96	0–1	SC Paderborn	Hanover
13:00 CET (UTC+1)		Report	Pröger 33'	Stadium: Eilenriedestadion; Attendance: 1,500; Referee: Franz Bokop

12 January 2020 Friendly	Werder Bremen	3–1	Hannover 96	Bremen
13:00 CET (UTC+1)	Sargent 33', 43'; Rashica 59'	Report	Prib 30'	Stadium: Weserstadion Platz 11; Attendance: 0 Referee: Lukas Benen

19 January 2020 Friendly	VfL Wolfsburg	2–1	Hannover 96	Wolfsburg
11:00 CET (UTC+1)	Steffen 41'; Mehmedi 81'	Report	Felipe 20'	Stadium: AOK-Stadion; Attendance: 0 Referee: Franz Bokop

19 January 2020 Friendly	Hannover 96	3–3	Viktoria Berlin	Hanover
15:00 CET (UTC+1)	Muslija 9'; Soto 45'; Ducksch 62'	Report	Falcão 23'; Schmidt 48'; Fardjad-Azad 80'	Stadium: HDI-Arena; Attendance: 0 Referee: Lukas Benen

26 March 2020 Friendly	Hertha BSC	Cancelled	Hannover 96	Berlin
15:00 CET (UTC+1)				Stadium: Stadion auf dem Wurfplatz
Note: The match was cancelled as the Hannover 96 players were quarantined due to a pandemic of COVID-19 in Germany.

== Competitions ==
Win Draw Loss

=== Overview ===
Competition	First match	Last match	Starting round	Final position	Record							
Competition	First match	Last match	Starting round	Final position	Pld	W	D	L	GF	GA	GD	Win %
2. Bundesliga	26 July 2019	28 June 2020	Matchday 1	6th	34	13	9	12	54	49	+5	38.24
DFB-Pokal	12 August 2019	12 August 2019	First round	First round	1	0	0	1	0	2	−2	0.00
Total					35	13	9	13	54	51	+3	37.14

Source: Competitions

=== 2. Bundesliga ===
==== League table ====
Pos	Team	Pld	W	D	L	GF	GA	GD	Pts
4	Hamburger SV	34	14	12	8	62	46	+16	54
5	Darmstadt 98	34	13	13	8	48	43	+5	52
6	Hannover 96	34	13	9	12	54	49	+5	48
7	Erzgebirge Aue	34	13	8	13	46	48	−2	47
8	VfL Bochum	34	11	13	10	53	51	+2	46

Source: DFB
Rules for classification: 1) Points; 2) Goal difference; 3) Goals scored; 4) Head-to-head points; 5) Head-to-head goal difference; 6) Head-to-head away goals scored; 7) Away goals scored; 8) Play-off.

==== Results summary ====
Overall								Home						Away					
Pld	W	D	L	GF	GA	GD	Pts	W	D	L	GF	GA	GD	W	D	L	GF	GA	GD
34	13	9	12	54	49	+5	48	6	8	3	27	21	+6	7	1	9	27	28	−1

Source: DFB

==== Results by round ====
Round	1	2	3	4	5	6	7	8	9	10	11	12	13	14	15	16	17	18	19	20	21	22	23	24	25	26	27	28	29	30	31	32	33	34
Ground	A	H	A	H	A	H	A	H	A	H	A	H	A	H	A	H	A	H	A	H	A	H	A	H	A	H	A	H	A	H	A	H	A	H
Result	L	D	W	D	L	L	W	L	W	D	D	D	L	L	W	W	L	D	L	D	W	D	L	W	W	W	W	D	L	W	L	W	L	W
Position	13	12	8	10	12	15	13	15	11	12	14	13	15	16	14	12	14	13	13	14	12	12	14	12	9	9	7	6	7	6	8	6	7	6

Source: DFB
A = Away; H = Home; W = Win; D = Draw; L = Loss

==== Matches ====
26 July 2019 1	VfB Stuttgart	2–1	Hannover 96	Stuttgart
20:30 CEST (UTC+2)	Gómez 29'; Didavi 36'	Report	Awoudja 39' (o.g.)	Stadium: Mercedes-Benz Arena; Attendance: 52,021; Referee: Felix Brych

3 August 2019 2	Hannover 96	1–1	Jahn Regensburg	Hanover
15:30 CEST (UTC+2)	Weydandt 66'	Report	Albers 79'	Stadium: HDI-Arena; Attendance: 28,500; Referee: Daniel Schlager

17 August 2019 3	Wehen Wiesbaden	0–3	Hannover 96	Wiesbaden
13:00 CEST (UTC+2)		Report	Ducksch 28', 77' (pen.); Muslija 57'	Stadium: BRITA-Arena; Attendance: 5,607; Referee: Timo Gerach

24 August 2019 4	Hannover 96	1–1	Greuther Fürth	Hanover
13:00 CEST (UTC+2)	Weydandt 47'	Report	Seguin 22'	Stadium: HDI-Arena; Attendance: 26,000; Referee: René Rohde

1 September 2019 5	Hamburger SV	3–0	Hannover 96	Hamburg
13:30 CEST (UTC+2)	Kittel 35'; Kinsombi 59'; Jatta 75'	Report		Stadium: Volksparkstadion; Attendance: 54,732; Referee: Bastian Dankert

14 September 2019 6	Hannover 96	0–2	Arminia Bielefeld	Hanover
13:00 CEST (UTC+2)		Report	Klos 32'; Voglsammer 64' (pen.)	Stadium: HDI-Arena; Attendance: 37,200; Referee: Patrick Ittrich

20 September 2019 7	Holstein Kiel	1–2	Hannover 96	Kiel
18:30 CEST (UTC+2)	Lee 63'	Report	Ducksch 43'; Teuchert 52'	Stadium: Holstein-Stadion; Attendance: 15,034; Referee: Martin Thomsen

30 September 2019 8	Hannover 96	0–4	1. FC Nürnberg	Hanover
20:30 CEST (UTC+2)		Report	Margreitter 3', 83'; Behrens 26'; Hack 45'	Stadium: HDI-Arena; Attendance: 26,800; Referee: Martin Petersen

5 October 2019 9	Dynamo Dresden	0–2	Hannover 96	Dresden
13:00 CEST (UTC+2)		Report	Korb 72'; Teuchert 89'	Stadium: Rudolf-Harbig-Stadion; Attendance: 28,359; Referee: Christian Dingert

20 October 2019 10	Hannover 96	0–0	VfL Osnabrück	Hanover
13:30 CEST (UTC+2)		Report		Stadium: HDI-Arena; Attendance: 37,600; Referee: Florian Badstübner

26 October 2019 11	Karlsruher SC	3–3	Hannover 96	Karlsruhe
13:00 CEST (UTC+2)	Wanitzek 9' (pen.); Gordon 77', 90+6'	Report	Weydandt 6', 90+4'; Ducksch 44' (pen.)	Stadium: Wildparkstadion; Attendance: 13,370; Referee: Guido Winkmann

1 November 2019 12	Hannover 96	1–1	SV Sandhausen	Hanover
18:30 CET (UTC+1)	Weydandt 7'	Report	Bouhaddouz 62'	Stadium: HDI-Arena; Attendance: 25,000; Referee: Sören Storks

10 November 2019 13	1. FC Heidenheim	4–0	Hannover 96	Heidenheim
13:30 CET (UTC+1)	Kleindienst 3', 49'; Schnatterer 53' (pen.); Griesbeck 70'	Report		Stadium: Voith-Arena; Attendance: 11,100; Referee: Lasse Koslowski

25 November 2019 14	Hannover 96	1–2	Darmstadt 98	Hanover
20:30 CET (UTC+1)	Haraguchi 14'	Report	Anton 4' (o.g.); Kempe 29'	Stadium: HDI-Arena; Attendance: 22,100; Referee: Martin Thomsen

30 November 2019 15	FC St. Pauli	0–1	Hannover 96	Hamburg
13:00 CET (UTC+1)		Report	Maina 7'	Stadium: Millerntor-Stadion; Attendance: 29,546; Referee: Robert Hartmann

7 December 2019 16	Hannover 96	3–2	Erzgebirge Aue	Hanover
13:00 CET (UTC+1)	Bakalorz 32'; Weydandt 75'; Haraguchi 90'	Report	Strauß 16'; Bakalorz 49' (o.g.)	Stadium: HDI-Arena; Attendance: 26,200; Referee: Michael Bacher

13 December 2019 17	VfL Bochum	2–1	Hannover 96	Bochum
18:30 CET (UTC+1)	Wintzheimer 14'; Zoller 28'	Report	Ducksch 66'	Stadium: Vonovia Ruhrstadion; Attendance: 16,519; Referee: Florian Badstübner

21 December 2019 18	Hannover 96	2–2	VfB Stuttgart	Hanover
13:00 CET (UTC+1)	Ducksch 13'; Prib 74'	Report	González 46'; Silas 62'	Stadium: HDI-Arena; Attendance: 35,200; Referee: Thorben Siewer

28 January 2020 19	Jahn Regensburg	1–0	Hannover 96	Regensburg
20:30 CET (UTC+1)	Besuschkow 45+6' (pen.)	Report		Stadium: Arena Regensburg; Attendance: 8,418; Referee: Patrick Alt

1 February 2020 20	Hannover 96	2–2	Wehen Wiesbaden	Hanover
13:00 CET (UTC+1)	Haraguchi 82'; Teuchert 87'	Report	Aigner 37'; Röcker 90'	Stadium: HDI-Arena; Attendance: 22,400; Referee: Manuel Gräfe

9 February 2020 21	Greuther Fürth	1–3	Hannover 96	Fürth
13:30 CET (UTC+1)	Anton 74' (o.g.)	Report	Haraguchi 41'; Teuchert 70'; Stehle 90+6'	Stadium: Sportpark Ronhof Thomas Sommer; Attendance: 9,580; Referee: Sören Storks

15 February 2020 22	Hannover 96	1–1	Hamburger SV	Hanover
13:00 CET (UTC+1)	Teuchert 51'	Report	Pohjanpalo 90+6'	Stadium: HDI-Arena; Attendance: 49,000; Referee: Matthias Jöllenbeck

23 February 2020 23	Arminia Bielefeld	1–0	Hannover 96	Bielefeld
14:00 CET (UTC+1)	Yabo 83'	Report		Stadium: Schüco-Arena; Attendance: 26,285; Referee: Robert Hartmann
Note: The match was originally scheduled for 13:30 CET, but was delayed to 14:00 CET due to adverse weather conditions.

2 March 2020 24	Hannover 96	3–1	Holstein Kiel	Hanover
20:30 CET (UTC+1)	Guidetti 11'; Ochs 80'; Weydandt 90+1'	Report	Lee 68'	Stadium: HDI-Arena; Attendance: 25,200; Referee: Sascha Stegemann

6 March 2020 25	1. FC Nürnberg	0–3	Hannover 96	Nuremberg
18:30 CET (UTC+1)		Report	Hübers 18'; Maina 27'; Weydandt 90'	Stadium: Max-Morlock-Stadion; Attendance: 26,745; Referee: Markus Schmidt

23 May 2020 27	VfL Osnabrück	2–4	Hannover 96	Osnabrück
13:00 CEST (UTC+2)	Ceesay 6' (pen.); Amenyido 47'	Report	van Aken 11' (o.g.); Ducksch 75' (pen.), 80'; Haraguchi 85'	Stadium: Stadion an der Bremer Brücke; Attendance: 0 Referee: Sven Jablonski
Note: The match was originally scheduled for 21 March 2020, 13:00 CET, but was postponed and played behind closed doors due to a pandemic of COVID-19 in Germany.

27 May 2020 28	Hannover 96	1–1	Karlsruher SC	Hanover
18:30 CEST (UTC+2)	Prib 47'	Report	Hofmann 69'	Stadium: HDI-Arena; Attendance: 0 Referee: Thorben Siewer
Note: The match was originally scheduled for 4 April 2020, 13:00 CEST, but was postponed and played behind closed doors due to a pandemic of COVID-19 in Germany.

30 May 2020 29	SV Sandhausen	3–1	Hannover 96	Sandhausen
13:00 CEST (UTC+2)	Biada 51'; Nauber 56'; Türpitz 82'	Report	Guidetti 58'	Stadium: BWT-Stadion am Hardtwald; Attendance: 0 Referee: Deniz Aytekin
Note: The match was originally scheduled for 11–13 April 2020, but was postponed and played behind closed doors due to a pandemic of COVID-19 in Germany.

3 June 2020 26	Hannover 96	3–0	Dynamo Dresden	Hanover
18:30 CEST (UTC+2)	Ducksch 10'; Guidetti 17'; Prib 45+1'	Report		Stadium: HDI-Arena; Attendance: 0 Referee: Manuel Gräfe
Note: The match was originally scheduled for 15 March 2020, 13:30 CET, but was postponed to 17 May 2020, 13:30 CEST as the Hannover 96 players were quarantined due to a pandemic of COVID-19 in Germany. It was postponed again after the Dynamo Dresden players were quarantined due to COVID-19 cases. The match was played behind closed doors.

7 June 2020 30	Hannover 96	2–1	1. FC Heidenheim	Hanover
13:30 CEST (UTC+2)	Ducksch 30'; Prib 41'	Report	Schimmer 75'	Stadium: HDI-Arena; Attendance: 0 Referee: Felix Zwayer
Note: The match was originally scheduled for 17–20 April 2020, but was postponed and played behind closed doors due to a pandemic of COVID-19 in Germany.

14 June 2020 31	Darmstadt 98	3–2	Hannover 96	Darmstadt
13:30 CEST (UTC+2)	Dursun 24'; Schnellhardt 62'; Franke 90' (o.g.)	Report	Prib 47'; Ducksch 58'	Stadium: Merck-Stadion am Böllenfalltor; Attendance: 0 Referee: Nicolas Winter
Note: The match was originally scheduled for 24–27 April 2020, but was postponed and played behind closed doors due to a pandemic of COVID-19 in Germany.

17 June 2020 32	Hannover 96	4–0	FC St. Pauli	Hanover
18:30 CEST (UTC+2)	Ducksch 6'; Weydandt 17'; Haraguchi 61'; Teuchert 80'	Report		Stadium: HDI-Arena; Attendance: 0 Referee: Alexander Sather
Note: The match was originally scheduled for 2–4 May 2020, but was postponed and played behind closed doors due to a pandemic of COVID-19 in Germany.

21 June 2020 33	Erzgebirge Aue	2–1	Hannover 96	Aue-Bad Schlema
15:30 CEST (UTC+2)	Testroet 23'; Fandrich 67'	Report	Ducksch 79'	Stadium: Erzgebirgsstadion; Attendance: 0 Referee: Florian Badstübner
Note: The match was originally scheduled for 10 May 2020, 15:30 CEST, but was postponed and played behind closed doors due to a pandemic of COVID-19 in Germany.

28 June 2020 34	Hannover 96	2–0	VfL Bochum	Hanover
15:30 CEST (UTC+2)	Ducksch 45', 84'	Report		Stadium: HDI-Arena; Attendance: 0 Referee: René Rohde
Note: The match was originally scheduled for 17 May 2020, 15:30 CEST, but was postponed and played behind closed doors due to a pandemic of COVID-19 in Germany.

=== DFB-Pokal ===
12 August 2019 First round	Karlsruher SC	2–0	Hannover 96	Karlsruhe
18:30 CEST (UTC+2)	Grozurek 53'; Wanitzek 61' (pen.)	Report		Stadium: Wildparkstadion; Attendance: 11,779; Referee: Benjamin Cortus

== Statistics ==
=== Appearances and goals ===
No.	Pos	Player	2. Bundesliga		DFB-Pokal		Total	
No.	Pos	Player	Apps	Goals	Apps	Goals	Apps	Goals
1	GK	(Germany) Ron-Robert Zieler	31	0	1	0	32	0
2	DF	(Croatia) Josip Elez	20+3	0	0	0	23	0
3	DF	(Chile) Miiko Albornoz	15+4	0	0	0	19	0
4	DF	(Germany) Julian Korb	22+4	1	0+1	0	27	1
5	DF	(Brazil) Felipe	8+1	0	1	0	10	0
6	MF	(Germany) Marvin Bakalorz	15+4	1	1	0	20	1
7	MF	(Germany) Edgar Prib	20+6	5	1	0	27	5
8	MF	(Brazil) Walace	0	0	0	0	0	0
9	FW	(Brazil) Jonathas	0+1	0	0	0	1	0
9	FW	(Sweden) John Guidetti	10+4	3	0	0	14	3
10	MF	(Japan) Genki Haraguchi	26+6	6	0+1	0	33	6
11	MF	(Germany) Linton Maina	18+6	2	1	0	25	2
13	GK	(Germany) Philipp Tschauner	0	0	0	0	0	0
13	MF	(Germany) Dominik Kaiser	15+1	0	0	0	16	0
15	DF	(Germany) Timo Hübers	11+1	1	0	0	12	1
16	FW	(United States) Sebastian Soto	0+2	0	0	0	2	0
17	FW	(Germany) Marvin Ducksch	21+7	15	1	0	29	15
18	MF	(Norway) Iver Fossum	0	0	0	0	0	0
18	MF	(Germany) Marc Stendera	10+7	0	0	0	17	0
19	FW	(Sweden) Emil Hansson	3+11	0	0	0	14	0
20	DF	(Germany) Dennis Aogo	4	0	0	0	4	0
20	MF	(Germany) Philipp Ochs	2+7	1	0	0	9	1
21	DF	(Germany) Jannes Horn	19+4	0	0	0	23	0
22	DF	(Germany) Matthias Ostrzolek	2+5	0	0	0	7	0
23	GK	(Germany) Michael Esser	1	0	0	0	1	0
23	GK	(Germany) Michael Ratajczak	1	0	0	0	1	0
24	DF	(Germany) Sebastian Jung	9	0	1	0	10	0
25	GK	(Denmark) Martin Hansen	1	0	0	0	1	0
26	FW	(Germany) Hendrik Weydandt	16+11	9	1	0	28	9
28	DF	(Germany) Marcel Franke	19	0	1	0	20	0
29	MF	(Germany) Simon Stehle	0+2	1	0	0	2	1
31	DF	(Germany) Waldemar Anton	30	0	1	0	31	0
33	FW	(Germany) Cedric Teuchert	15+8	6	0+1	0	24	6
34	MF	(Germany) Niklas Tarnat	0	0	0	0	0	0
35	MF	(Kosovo) Florent Muslija	10+10	1	1	0	21	1
36	DF	(United States) Chris Gloster	0	0	0	0	0	0
37	FW	(Germany) Justin Neiß	0	0	0	0	0	0
40	FW	(Germany) Marco Stefandl	0	0	0	0	0	0

=== Goalscorers ===
Rank	No.	Pos	Name	2. Bundesliga	DFB-Pokal	Total
1	17	FW	(Germany) Marvin Ducksch	15	0	15
2	26	FW	(Germany) Hendrik Weydandt	9	0	9
3	10	MF	(Japan) Genki Haraguchi	6	0	6
3	33	FW	(Germany) Cedric Teuchert	6	0	6
5	7	MF	(Germany) Edgar Prib	5	0	5
6	9	FW	(Sweden) John Guidetti	3	0	3
7	11	MF	(Germany) Linton Maina	2	0	2
8	4	DF	(Germany) Julian Korb	1	0	1
8	6	MF	(Germany) Marvin Bakalorz	1	0	1
8	15	DF	(Germany) Timo Hübers	1	0	1
8	20	MF	(Germany) Philipp Ochs	1	0	1
8	29	MF	(Germany) Simon Stehle	1	0	1
8	35	MF	(Kosovo) Florent Muslija	1	0	1
Own goals				2	0	2
Total				54	0	54

=== Clean sheets ===
Rank	No.	Pos	Name	2. Bundesliga	DFB-Pokal	Total
1	1	GK	(Germany) Ron-Robert Zieler	7	0	7
2	25	GK	(Denmark) Martin Hansen	1	0	1
Total				8	0	8

=== Disciplinary record ===
Rank	No.	Pos	Name	2. Bundesliga			DFB-Pokal			Total		
Rank	No.	Pos	Name	Booked	(yellow card) (yellow-red card)	Sent off (straight red)	Booked	(yellow card) (yellow-red card)	Sent off (straight red)	Booked	(yellow card) (yellow-red card)	Sent off (straight red)
1	31	DF	(Germany) Waldemar Anton	11	1	0	0	0	0	11	1	0
2	7	MF	(Germany) Edgar Prib	8	0	0	0	0	0	8	0	0
3	28	DF	(Germany) Marcel Franke	2	0	1	0	0	0	2	0	1
4	3	DF	(Chile) Miiko Albornoz	3	1	0	0	0	0	3	1	0
4	10	MF	(Japan) Genki Haraguchi	6	0	0	0	0	0	6	0	0
4	18	MF	(Germany) Marc Stendera	3	1	0	0	0	0	3	1	0
4	21	DF	(Germany) Jannes Horn	6	0	0	0	0	0	6	0	0
8	2	DF	(Croatia) Josip Elez	1	1	0	0	0	0	1	1	0
8	4	DF	(Germany) Julian Korb	4	0	0	0	0	0	4	0	0
8	5	DF	(Brazil) Felipe	4	0	0	0	0	0	4	0	0
11	1	GK	(Germany) Ron-Robert Zieler	0	1	0	0	0	0	0	1	0
11	13	MF	(Germany) Dominik Kaiser	3	0	0	0	0	0	3	0	0
11	15	DF	(Germany) Timo Hübers	3	0	0	0	0	0	3	0	0
11	17	FW	(Germany) Marvin Ducksch	3	0	0	0	0	0	3	0	0
11	22	DF	(Germany) Matthias Ostrzolek	0	1	0	0	0	0	0	1	0
16	6	MF	(Germany) Marvin Bakalorz	2	0	0	0	0	0	2	0	0
16	9	FW	(Sweden) John Guidetti	2	0	0	0	0	0	2	0	0
16	20	MF	(Germany) Philipp Ochs	2	0	0	0	0	0	2	0	0
16	35	MF	(Kosovo) Florent Muslija	1	0	0	1	0	0	2	0	0
20	11	MF	(Germany) Linton Maina	1	0	0	0	0	0	1	0	0
20	20	DF	(Germany) Dennis Aogo	1	0	0	0	0	0	1	0	0
20	33	FW	(Germany) Cedric Teuchert	1	0	0	0	0	0	1	0	0
Total				67	6	1	1	0	0	68	6	1
