= 2018–19 Hannover 96 season =

Hannover 96
2018–19 season
- President: Martin Kind
- Manager: André Breitenreiter (until 27 January); Thomas Doll (from 27 January)
- Stadium: HDI-Arena
- Bundesliga: 17th (relegated)
- DFB-Pokal: Second round
- Top goalscorer: League: Hendrik Weydandt (6); All: Hendrik Weydandt (8)
- Highest home attendance: 49,000
- Lowest home attendance: 30,400
- Average home league attendance: 38,365
- Biggest win: Karlsruhe 0–6 Hannover
- Biggest defeat: Hannover 0–4 Bayern; Dortmund 5–1 Hannover; Stuttgart 5–1 Hannover
Home colours	Away colours	Third colours

The 2018–19 Hannover 96 season was the 123rd season in the football club's history and 30th overall season in the top flight of German football, the Bundesliga, having been promoted from the 2. Bundesliga in 2017. Hannover 96 also participated in this season's edition of the domestic cup, the DFB-Pokal. This was the 60th season for Hannover in the HDI-Arena, located in Hanover, Lower Saxony, in Germany. The season covered a period from 1 July 2018 to 30 June 2019.

== Players ==
=== Squad information ===
As of 5 March 2019

Note: Flags indicate national team as defined under FIFA eligibility rules; some limited exceptions apply. Players may hold more than one non-FIFA nationality.

No.	Pos.	Nation	Player
2	DF	CRO	Josip Elez
3	DF	CHI	Miiko Albornoz
4	DF	GER	Julian Korb
5	DF	BRA	Felipe
6	MF	GER	Marvin Bakalorz (captain)
7	MF	GER	Edgar Prib
8	MF	BRA	Walace
9	FW	BRA	Jonathas
10	MF	JPN	Genki Haraguchi
11	FW	JPN	Takuma Asano (on loan from Arsenal)
13	FW	TOG	Ihlas Bebou
14	DF	GER	Kevin Akpoguma (on loan from 1899 Hoffenheim)
15	DF	GER	Timo Hübers
16	FW	USA	Sebastian Soto
17	FW	USA	Bobby Wood (on loan from Hamburger SV)
18	MF	NOR	Iver Fossum
19	GK	AUT	Samuel Şahin-Radlinger
21	FW	GER	Nicolai Müller (on loan from Eintracht Frankfurt)

No.	Pos.	Nation	Player
22	DF	GER	Matthias Ostrzolek
23	GK	GER	Michael Esser (3rd captain)
24	FW	GER	Niclas Füllkrug
25	DF	GER	Oliver Sorg
26	FW	GER	Hendrik Weydandt
27	MF	SUI	Pirmin Schwegler (vice-captain)
28	DF	AUT	Kevin Wimmer (on loan from Stoke City)
29	FW	BIH	Benjamin Hadžić
30	GK	GER	Leo Weinkauf
31	DF	GER	Waldemar Anton
33	FW	DEN	Uffe Bech
34	MF	GER	Tim Dierßen
35	MF	GER	Florent Muslija
37	FW	NGA	Noah Sarenren Bazee
38	FW	GER	Tom Baller
39	FW	GER	Yousef Emghames
40	MF	GER	Linton Maina

=== Out on loan ===
Note: Flags indicate national team as defined under FIFA eligibility rules; some limited exceptions apply. Players may hold more than one non-FIFA nationality.

No.	Pos.	Nation	Player
1	GK	GER	Philipp Tschauner (on loan to FC Ingolstadt until 30 June 2019)
8	MF	GER	Manuel Schmiedebach (on loan to Union Berlin until 30 June 2019)
33	MF	GER	Mike-Steven Bähre (on loan to Barnsley until 30 June 2019)

=== Transfers ===
==== In ====
No.	Pos	Player	From	Type	Window	Ends	Fee	Source
2	DF	(Croatia) Josip Elez	(Croatia) Rijeka	Transfer	Summer	30 June 2021	€2.5 million	
8	MF	(Brazil) Walace	(Germany) Hamburger SV	Transfer	Summer	30 June 2022	€6 million	
10	MF	(Japan) Genki Haraguchi	(Germany) Hertha BSC	Transfer	Summer	30 June 2021	€4 million	
11	FW	(Japan) Takuma Asano	(England) Arsenal	Loan	Summer	30 June 2019	Free	
17	FW	(United States) Bobby Wood	(Germany) Hamburger SV	Loan	Summer	30 June 2019	€1.5 million	
21	FW	(Germany) Marius Wolf	(Germany) Eintracht Frankfurt	Return from loan	Summer	–	–	
28	DF	(Austria) Kevin Wimmer	(England) Stoke City	Loan	Summer	30 June 2019	€1.5 million	
29	FW	(Senegal) Babacar Guèye	(Belgium) Sint-Truiden	Return from loan	Summer	30 June 2019	–	
30	GK	(Germany) Leo Weinkauf	(Germany) Bayern Munich II	Transfer	Summer	30 June 2021	Free	
33	MF	(Germany) Mike-Steven Bähre	(Germany) SV Meppen	Return from loan	Summer	30 June 2019	–	
35	FW	(Denmark) Uffe Bech	(Germany) Greuther Fürth	Return from loan	Summer	30 June 2019	–	
35	MF	(Germany) Florent Muslija	(Germany) Karlsruher SC	Transfer	Summer	30 June 2022	€2 million	
9	FW	(Brazil) Jonathas	(Brazil) Corinthians	Return from loan	Winter	30 June 2020	–	
14	DF	(Germany) Kevin Akpoguma	(Germany) 1899 Hoffenheim	Loan	Winter	30 June 2019	Free	
19	GK	(Austria) Samuel Şahin-Radlinger	(Norway) Brann	Return from loan	Winter	30 June 2019	–	
21	FW	(Germany) Nicolai Müller	(Germany) Eintracht Frankfurt	Loan	Winter	30 June 2019	Free	
33	FW	(Denmark) Uffe Bech	(Denmark) Brøndby	Return from loan	Winter	30 June 2019	–	

==== Out ====
No.	Pos	Player	To	Type	Window	Fee	Source
2	DF	(Croatia) Josip Elez	(Croatia) Rijeka	End of loan	Summer	–	
8	MF	(Germany) Manuel Schmiedebach	(Germany) Union Berlin	Loan	Summer	Free	
9	FW	(Brazil) Jonathas	(Brazil) Corinthians	Loan	Summer	Free	
10	MF	(Germany) Sebastian Maier	(Germany) VfL Bochum	Transfer	Summer	Free	
11	MF	(Germany) Felix Klaus	(Germany) VfL Wolfsburg	Transfer	Summer	€3 million	
14	FW	(Austria) Martin Harnik	(Germany) Werder Bremen	Transfer	Summer	€3 million	
19	DF	(Germany) Florian Hübner	(Germany) Union Berlin	Transfer	Summer	Free	
20	MF	(Senegal) Salif Sané	(Germany) Schalke 04	Transfer	Summer	€8 million	
21	FW	(Germany) Marius Wolf	(Germany) Eintracht Frankfurt	Transfer	Summer	€500,000	
26	FW	(Turkey) Kenan Karaman	(Germany) Fortuna Düsseldorf	End of contract	Summer	–	
29	FW	(Senegal) Babacar Guèye	(Germany) SC Paderborn	Transfer	Summer	Free	
33	DF	(Germany) Fynn Arkenberg	(Germany) Hallescher FC	End of contract	Summer	–	
33	MF	(Germany) Mike-Steven Bähre	(England) Barnsley	Loan	Summer	Free	
35	FW	(Denmark) Uffe Bech	(Denmark) Brøndby	Loan	Summer	Free	
35	FW	(Curaçao) Charlison Benschop	(Germany) FC Ingolstadt	End of contract	Summer	–	
1	GK	(Germany) Philipp Tschauner	(Germany) FC Ingolstadt	Loan	Winter	Free	
32	MF	(Turkey) Mete Kaan Demir	(Turkey) İstanbul Başakşehir	Transfer	Winter	Free	

== Friendly matches ==
Win Draw Loss

5 July 2018 Friendly	Eiderstedt XI (Germany)	0–14	(Germany) Hannover 96	Garding
18:30 CEST (UTC+2)		Report	Maina 9', 23'; Füllkrug 12', 36', 36'; Bakalorz 18'; Sarenren Bazee 25'; Weydandt 46', 50', 62'; Guèye 49'; Ostrzolek 64'; Bebou 75'; Fossum 78'	Stadium: Sportplatz; Attendance: 1,000

13 July 2018 Friendly	SV Ramlingen/Ehlershausen (Germany)	0–7	(Germany) Hannover 96	Burgdorf
18:30 CEST (UTC+2)		Report	Füllkrug 30', 45'; Asano 60'; Caran 63' (o.g.); Weydandt 70', 82'; Sorg 79'	Stadium: Wahrendorff-Arena; Attendance: 2,080

14 July 2018 Friendly	TSV Havelse (Germany)	0–4	(Germany) Hannover 96	Garbsen
18:45 CEST (UTC+2)		Report	Sarenren Bazee 10'; Hübers 30'; Füllkrug 43'; Wood 82'	Stadium: Wilhelm-Langrehr-Stadion; Attendance: 2,512

18 July 2018 Friendly	Hannover 96 (Germany)	2–0	(Germany) Wacker Nordhausen	Hanover
18:00 CEST (UTC+2)	Anton 11'; Asano 88'	Report		Stadium: Eilenriedestadion; Attendance: 1,000

21 July 2018 Friendly	Hannover 96 (Germany)	3–1	(Netherlands) PEC Zwolle	Sehnde
17:00 CEST (UTC+2)	Füllkrug 11', 57'; Weydandt 93'	Report	Genreau 21'	Stadium: Wahre-Dorff Arena; Attendance: 2,196
Note: The match lasted for 2×60 minutes.

1 August 2018 Friendly	Wolfsberger AC (Austria)	3–2	(Germany) Hannover 96	Wolfsberg, Austria
18:00 CEST (UTC+2)	Gschweidl 14', 52'; Orgill 110'	Report	Asano 49'; Wood 71' (pen.)	Stadium: Lavanttal-Arena
Note: The match lasted for 2×60 minutes.

4 August 2018 Friendly	Udinese (Italy)	1–5	(Germany) Hannover 96	Klagenfurt, Austria
15:30 CEST (UTC+2)	Jaadi 42' (pen.)	Report	Walace 28', 76' (pen.); Asano 32'; Weydandt 44', 48'	Stadium: Wörthersee Stadion; Attendance: 0

4 August 2018 Friendly	Udinese (Italy)	1–2	(Germany) Hannover 96	Klagenfurt, Austria
19:00 CEST (UTC+2)	Lasagna 81'	Report	Bebou 25'; Füllkrug 68' (pen.)	Stadium: Wörthersee Stadion

11 August 2018 Friendly	Hannover 96 (Germany)	2–0	(Spain) Athletic Bilbao	Hanover
15:30 CEST (UTC+2)	Füllkrug 23'; Asano 28'	Report		Stadium: HDI-Arena; Attendance: 11,200; Referee: Florian Heft

5 September 2018 Friendly	Hannoverscher SC (Germany)	0–4	(Germany) Hannover 96	Hanover
18:30 CEST (UTC+2)		Report	Weydandt 65', 69', 71'; Haraguchi 77'	Stadium: Stadion an der Constantinstraße; Attendance: 2,100

6 January 2019 Friendly	Hannover 96 (Germany)	0–0	(Netherlands) N.E.C.	Marbella, Spain
15:30 CET (UTC+1)		Report		Stadium: Westin La Quinta hotel training ground Attendance: 200; Referee: Daniel Durán

9 January 2019 Friendly	Hannover 96 (Germany)	3–3	(Belgium) Zulte Waregem	Marbella, Spain
15:30 CET (UTC+1)	Hadžić 76'; Muslija 81'; Weydandt 88'	Report	Nissilä 68'; Sylla 70'; De Pauw 75'	Stadium: Westin La Quinta hotel training ground Attendance: 110; Referee: Gutierrez Perez

13 January 2019 Friendly	Hannover 96 (Germany)	4–1	(Netherlands) Heracles Almelo	Hanover
14:30 CET (UTC+1)	Wood 10', 58'; Weydandt 23'; Müller 83'	Report	van der Water 89'	Stadium: Eilenriedestadion; Attendance: 560; Referee: Eric Müller
Note: The match lasted for 4×30 minutes.

22 March 2019 Friendly	Arminia Bielefeld (Germany)	5–0	(Germany) Hannover 96	Bielefeld
18:00 CET (UTC+1)	Staude 9', 24'; Klos 26'; Voglsammer 51', 69'	Report		Stadium: SchücoArena; Attendance: 1,530

== Competitions ==
Win Draw Loss

=== Overview ===
Competition	First match	Last match	Starting round	Final position	Record							
Competition	First match	Last match	Starting round	Final position	Pld	W	D	L	GF	GA	GD	Win %
Bundesliga	25 August 2018	18 May 2019	Matchday 1	17th	34	5	6	23	31	71	−40	14.71
DFB-Pokal	19 August 2018	30 October 2018	First round	Second round	2	1	0	1	6	2	+4	50.00
Total					36	6	6	24	37	73	−36	16.67

Source: Competitions

=== Bundesliga ===
==== League table ====
Pos	Team	Pld	W	D	L	GF	GA	GD	Pts	Qualification or relegation
14	Schalke 04	34	8	9	17	37	55	−18	33	
15	FC Augsburg	34	8	8	18	51	71	−20	32	
16	VfB Stuttgart (R)	34	7	7	20	32	70	−38	28	Qualification for the relegation play-offs
17	Hannover 96 (R)	34	5	6	23	31	71	−40	21	Relegation to 2. Bundesliga
18	1. FC Nürnberg (R)	34	3	10	21	26	68	−42	19	Relegation to 2. Bundesliga

Source: DFB
Rules for classification: 1) Points; 2) Goal difference; 3) Goals scored; 4) Head-to-head results; 5) Head-to-head away goals scored; 6) Away goals scored; 7) Play-off
(R) Relegated

==== Results summary ====
Overall								Home						Away					
Pld	W	D	L	GF	GA	GD	Pts	W	D	L	GF	GA	GD	W	D	L	GF	GA	GD
34	5	6	23	31	71	−40	21	5	1	11	15	26	−11	0	5	12	16	45	−29

Source: Bundesliga

==== Results by round ====
Round	1	2	3	4	5	6	7	8	9	10	11	12	13	14	15	16	17	18	19	20	21	22	23	24	25	26	27	28	29	30	31	32	33	34
Ground	A	H	A	A	H	A	H	A	H	A	H	A	H	A	H	A	H	H	A	H	H	A	H	A	H	A	H	A	H	A	H	A	H	A
Result	D	D	L	L	L	L	W	D	L	L	W	L	L	D	L	D	L	L	L	L	W	L	L	L	L	L	L	L	L	D	W	L	W	L
Position	9	11	13	16	16	18	16	15	16	16	16	16	17	17	18	17	17	17	17	18	17	17	17	17	17	17	18	18	18	18	18	18	17	17

Source: DFB
A = Away; H = Home; W = Win; D = Draw; L = Loss

==== Matches ====
25 August 2018 1	Werder Bremen	1–1	Hannover 96	Bremen
15:30 CEST (UTC+2)	Gebre Selassie 85'	Report	Weydandt 76'	Stadium: Weser-Stadion; Attendance: 42,100; Referee: Felix Brych

31 August 2018 2	Hannover 96	0–0	Borussia Dortmund	Hanover
20:30 CEST (UTC+2)		Report		Stadium: HDI-Arena; Attendance: 49,000; Referee: Felix Zwayer

15 September 2018 3	RB Leipzig	3–2	Hannover 96	Leipzig
15:30 CEST (UTC+2)	Poulsen 9'; Werner 40', 63'	Report	Füllkrug 13'; Albornoz 65'	Stadium: Red Bull Arena; Attendance: 38,937; Referee: Robert Kampka

22 September 2018 4	1. FC Nürnberg	2–0	Hannover 96	Nuremberg
15:30 CEST (UTC+2)	Anton 76' (o.g.); Knöll 77'	Report		Stadium: Max-Morlock-Stadion; Attendance: 36,736; Referee: Bastian Dankert

25 September 2018 5	Hannover 96	1–3	1899 Hoffenheim	Hanover
20:30 CEST (UTC+2)	Füllkrug 55' (pen.)	Report	Brenet 20'; Kadeřábek 49'; Belfodil 90+3'	Stadium: HDI-Arena; Attendance: 33,500; Referee: Christian Dingert

30 September 2018 6	Eintracht Frankfurt	4–1	Hannover 96	Frankfurt
15:30 CEST (UTC+2)	N'Dicka 36'; Rebić 45+1'; de Guzmán 59'; Jović 89'	Report	Muslija 86'	Stadium: Commerzbank-Arena; Attendance: 46,300; Referee: Robert Hartmann

6 October 2018 7	Hannover 96	3–1	VfB Stuttgart	Hanover
15:30 CEST (UTC+2)	Wood 30', 45+1'; Bebou 90+1'	Report	Gómez 50'	Stadium: HDI-Arena; Attendance: 40,800; Referee: Sascha Stegemann

20 October 2018 8	Bayer Leverkusen	2–2	Hannover 96	Leverkusen
15:30 CEST (UTC+2)	L. Bender 34'; Bellarabi 90+4'	Report	Muslija 25'; Felipe 54'	Stadium: BayArena; Attendance: 26,435; Referee: Patrick Ittrich

27 October 2018 9	Hannover 96	1–2	FC Augsburg	Hanover
15:30 CEST (UTC+2)	Bebou 72'	Report	Khedira 8'; Finnbogason 63' (pen.)	Stadium: HDI-Arena; Attendance: 37,600; Referee: Robert Kampka

3 November 2018 10	Schalke 04	3–1	Hannover 96	Gelsenkirchen
15:30 CET (UTC+1)	Bentaleb 57' (pen.); Embolo 71'; Uth 85'	Report	Weydandt 70'	Stadium: Veltins-Arena; Attendance: 61,959; Referee: Markus Schmidt

9 November 2018 11	Hannover 96	2–1	VfL Wolfsburg	Hanover
20:30 CET (UTC+1)	Maina 31'; Bebou 62' (pen.)	Report	Weghorst 82' (pen.)	Stadium: HDI-Arena; Attendance: 35,800; Referee: Marco Fritz

25 November 2018 12	Borussia Mönchengladbach	4–1	Hannover 96	Mönchengladbach
18:00 CET (UTC+1)	Hazard 7'; Lang 44'; Stindl 58'; Zakaria 77'	Report	Wood 1'	Stadium: Borussia-Park; Attendance: 48,692; Referee: Daniel Siebert

1 December 2018 13	Hannover 96	0–2	Hertha BSC	Hanover
15:30 CET (UTC+1)		Report	Torunarigha 44'; Ibišević 73'	Stadium: HDI-Arena; Attendance: 35,800; Referee: Felix Brych

9 December 2018 14	Mainz 05	1–1	Hannover 96	Mainz
15:30 CET (UTC+1)	Brosinski 89' (pen.)	Report	Weydandt 12'	Stadium: Opel Arena; Attendance: 23,305; Referee: Robert Hartmann

15 December 2018 15	Hannover 96	0–4	Bayern Munich	Hanover
15:30 CET (UTC+1)		Report	Kimmich 2'; Alaba 29'; Gnabry 53'; Lewandowski 62'	Stadium: HDI-Arena; Attendance: 49,000; Referee: Sören Storks

19 December 2018 16	SC Freiburg	1–1	Hannover 96	Freiburg
20:30 CET (UTC+1)	Waldschmidt 3' (pen.)	Report	Felipe 14'	Stadium: Schwarzwald-Stadion; Attendance: 23,500; Referee: Christian Dingert

22 December 2018 17	Hannover 96	0–1	Fortuna Düsseldorf	Hanover
15:30 CET (UTC+1)		Report	Fink 90+2'	Stadium: HDI-Arena; Attendance: 34,200; Referee: Bastian Dankert

19 January 2019 18	Hannover 96	0–1	Werder Bremen	Hanover
15:30 CET (UTC+1)		Report	Rashica 32'	Stadium: HDI-Arena; Attendance: 44,300; Referee: Marco Fritz

26 January 2019 19	Borussia Dortmund	5–1	Hannover 96	Dortmund
15:30 CET (UTC+1)	Hakimi 24'; Reus 60'; Götze 62'; Guerreiro 67'; Witsel 90'	Report	Bakalorz 86'	Stadium: Signal Iduna Park; Attendance: 81,365; Referee: Manuel Gräfe

1 February 2019 20	Hannover 96	0–3	RB Leipzig	Hanover
20:30 CET (UTC+1)		Report	Halstenberg 45+3' (pen.); Orbán 64', 85'	Stadium: HDI-Arena; Attendance: 32,400; Referee: Daniel Schlager

9 February 2019 21	Hannover 96	2–0	1. FC Nürnberg	Hanover
15:30 CET (UTC+1)	Müller 45+5', 77'	Report		Stadium: HDI-Arena; Attendance: 33,700; Referee: Tobias Welz

16 February 2019 22	1899 Hoffenheim	3–0	Hannover 96	Sinsheim
15:30 CET (UTC+1)	Joelinton 4'; Belfodil 14'; Demirbay 80'	Report		Stadium: PreZero Arena; Attendance: 23,404; Referee: Daniel Siebert

24 February 2019 23	Hannover 96	0–3	Eintracht Frankfurt	Hanover
15:30 CET (UTC+1)		Report	Rebić 54'; Jović 63'; Kostić 90'	Stadium: HDI-Arena; Attendance: 39,100; Referee: Marco Fritz

3 March 2019 24	VfB Stuttgart	5–1	Hannover 96	Stuttgart
15:30 CET (UTC+1)	Gómez 4'; Kabak 16', 45'; Zuber 78', 81'	Report	Jonathas 68'	Stadium: Mercedes-Benz Arena; Attendance: 55,781; Referee: Bastian Dankert

10 March 2019 25	Hannover 96	2–3	Bayer Leverkusen	Hanover
18:00 CET (UTC+1)	Jonathas 51'; Weiser 73' (o.g.)	Report	Volland 13', 28'; Havertz 87'	Stadium: HDI-Arena; Attendance: 33,800; Referee: Sören Storks

16 March 2019 26	FC Augsburg	3–1	Hannover 96	Augsburg
15:30 CET (UTC+1)	Córdova 65'; Schmid 78'; Hahn 86'	Report	Weydandt 8'	Stadium: WWK Arena; Attendance: 28,136; Referee: Manuel Gräfe

31 March 2019 27	Hannover 96	0–1	Schalke 04	Hanover
15:30 CEST (UTC+2)		Report	Serdar 39'	Stadium: HDI-Arena; Attendance: 44,500; Referee: Sven Jablonski

6 April 2019 28	VfL Wolfsburg	3–1	Hannover 96	Wolfsburg
15:30 CEST (UTC+2)	Steffen 32', 71'; Roussillon 78'	Report	Weydandt 30'	Stadium: Volkswagen Arena; Attendance: 23,512; Referee: Benjamin Cortus

13 April 2019 29	Hannover 96	0–1	Borussia Mönchengladbach	Hanover
15:30 CEST (UTC+2)		Report	Raffael 53'	Stadium: HDI-Arena; Attendance: 40,200; Referee: Felix Brych

21 April 2019 30	Hertha BSC	0–0	Hannover 96	Berlin
18:00 CEST (UTC+2)		Report		Stadium: Olympiastadion Berlin; Attendance: 38,916; Referee: Sascha Stegemann

27 April 2019 31	Hannover 96	1–0	Mainz 05	Hanover
15:30 CEST (UTC+2)	Weydandt 66'	Report		Stadium: HDI-Arena; Attendance: 30,400; Referee: Sören Storks

4 May 2019 32	Bayern Munich	3–1	Hannover 96	Munich
15:30 CEST (UTC+2)	Lewandowski 27'; Goretzka 40'; Ribéry 83'	Report	Jonathas 51' (pen.)	Stadium: Allianz Arena; Attendance: 75,000; Referee: Christian Dingert

11 May 2019 33	Hannover 96	3–0	SC Freiburg	Hanover
15:30 CEST (UTC+2)	Anton 39'; Bebou 51'; Walace 81'	Report		Stadium: HDI-Arena; Attendance: 38,100; Referee: Robert Hartmann

18 May 2019 34	Fortuna Düsseldorf	2–1	Hannover 96	Düsseldorf
15:30 CEST (UTC+2)	Hennings 56'; Karaman 60'	Report	Müller 78'	Stadium: Merkur Spiel-Arena; Attendance: 50,000; Referee: Benjamin Cortus

=== DFB-Pokal ===
19 August 2018 First round	Karlsruher SC	0–6	Hannover 96	Karlsruhe
15:30 CEST (UTC+2)		Report	Wimmer 17'; Bebou 31'; Füllkrug 41' (pen.); Asano 51'; Weydandt 85', 90'	Stadium: Wildparkstadion; Attendance: 10,000; Referee: Bastian Dankert

30 October 2018 Second round	Hannover 96	0–2	VfL Wolfsburg	Hanover
18:30 CET (UTC+1)	Mehmedi 20'; Weghorst 90+3'	Report		Stadium: HDI-Arena; Attendance: 34,400; Referee: Benjamin Cortus

== Statistics ==
=== Appearances and goals ===
No.	Pos	Nat	Player	Total		Bundesliga		DFB-Pokal	
No.	Pos	Nat	Player	Apps	Goals	Apps	Goals	Apps	Goals
1	GK	(Germany) GER	Philipp Tschauner	2	0	1	0	1	0
2	DF	(Croatia) CRO	Josip Elez	10	0	7+2	0	1	0
3	DF	(Chile) CHI	Miiko Albornoz	23	1	19+3	1	1	0
4	DF	(Germany) GER	Julian Korb	12	0	11+1	0	0	0
5	DF	(Brazil) BRA	Felipe	18	2	14+3	2	0+1	0
6	MF	(Germany) GER	Marvin Bakalorz	24	1	16+8	1	0	0
7	MF	(Germany) GER	Edgar Prib	4	0	2+2	0	0	0
8	MF	(Brazil) BRA	Walace	28	1	23+3	1	2	0
9	FW	(Brazil) BRA	Jonathas	10	3	6+4	3	0	0
10	MF	(Japan) JPN	Genki Haraguchi	29	0	22+6	0	1	0
11	FW	(Japan) JPN	Takuma Asano	14	1	9+3	0	2	1
13	FW	(Togo) TOG	Ihlas Bebou	14	5	12	4	2	1
14	DF	(Germany) GER	Kevin Akpoguma	4	0	4	0	0	0
15	DF	(Germany) GER	Timo Hübers	0	0	0	0	0	0
16	FW	(United States) USA	Sebastian Soto	3	0	0+3	0	0	0
17	FW	(United States) USA	Bobby Wood	20	3	12+6	3	0+2	0
18	MF	(Norway) NOR	Iver Fossum	11	0	5+4	0	1+1	0
19	GK	(Austria) AUT	Samuel Şahin-Radlinger	1	0	1	0	0	0
21	FW	(Germany) GER	Nicolai Müller	14	3	11+3	3	0	0
22	DF	(Germany) GER	Matthias Ostrzolek	19	0	16+2	0	1	0
23	GK	(Germany) GER	Michael Esser	33	0	32	0	1	0
24	FW	(Germany) GER	Niclas Füllkrug	15	3	13+1	2	1	1
25	DF	(Germany) GER	Oliver Sorg	20	0	18+1	0	1	0
26	FW	(Germany) GER	Hendrik Weydandt	30	8	18+10	6	1+1	2
27	MF	(Switzerland) SUI	Pirmin Schwegler	27	0	25+1	0	1	0
28	DF	(Austria) AUT	Kevin Wimmer	24	1	17+5	0	2	1
29	FW	(Bosnia and Herzegovina) BIH	Benjamin Hadžić	3	0	0+3	0	0	0
30	GK	(Germany) GER	Leo Weinkauf	0	0	0	0	0	0
31	DF	(Germany) GER	Waldemar Anton	36	1	34	1	2	0
32	MF	(Turkey) TUR	Mete Kaan Demir	0	0	0	0	0	0
33	FW	(Denmark) DEN	Uffe Bech	2	0	0+2	0	0	0
34	MF	(Germany) GER	Tim Dierßen	1	0	0+1	0	0	0
35	MF	(Germany) GER	Florent Muslija	18	2	6+11	2	0+1	0
37	MF	(Nigeria) NGA	Noah Sarenren Bazee	3	0	3	0	0	0
38	MF	(Germany) GER	Tom Baller	0	0	0	0	0	0
39	FW	(Germany) GER	Yousef Emghames	0	0	0	0	0	0
40	MF	(Germany) GER	Linton Maina	21	1	17+3	1	1	0

=== Goalscorers ===
Rank	No.	Pos	Name	Bundesliga	DFB-Pokal	Total
1	26	FW	(Germany) Hendrik Weydandt	6	2	8
2	13	FW	(Togo) Ihlas Bebou	4	1	5
3	9	FW	(Brazil) Jonathas	3	0	3
3	17	FW	(United States) Bobby Wood	3	0	3
3	21	FW	(Germany) Nicolai Müller	3	0	3
3	24	FW	(Germany) Niclas Füllkrug	2	1	3
7	5	DF	(Brazil) Felipe	2	0	2
7	35	MF	(Germany) Florent Muslija	2	0	2
9	3	DF	(Chile) Miiko Albornoz	1	0	1
9	6	MF	(Germany) Marvin Bakalorz	1	0	1
9	8	MF	(Brazil) Walace	1	0	1
9	11	FW	(Japan) Takuma Asano	0	1	1
9	28	DF	(Austria) Kevin Wimmer	0	1	1
9	31	DF	(Germany) Waldemar Anton	1	0	1
9	40	MF	(Germany) Linton Maina	1	0	1
Own goal				1	0	1
Total				31	6	37

=== Clean sheets ===
Rank	No.	Pos	Name	Bundesliga	DFB-Pokal	Total
1	23	GK	(Germany) Michael Esser	5	1	6
Total				5	1	6

=== Disciplinary record ===
Rank	No.	Pos	Name	Bundesliga			DFB-Pokal			Total		
Rank	No.	Pos	Name	Booked	(yellow card) (yellow-red card)	Sent off (straight red)	Booked	(yellow card) (yellow-red card)	Sent off (straight red)	Booked	(yellow card) (yellow-red card)	Sent off (straight red)
1	3	DF	(Chile) Miiko Albornoz	2	0	1	1	0	0	3	0	1
1	25	DF	(Germany) Oliver Sorg	5	1	0	0	0	0	5	1	0
3	5	DF	(Brazil) Felipe	4	1	0	0	0	0	4	1	0
3	27	MF	(Switzerland) Pirmin Schwegler	7	0	0	0	0	0	7	0	0
5	8	MF	(Brazil) Walace	5	0	0	1	0	0	6	0	0
6	6	MF	(Germany) Marvin Bakalorz	5	0	0	0	0	0	5	0	0
6	9	FW	(Brazil) Jonathas	2	1	0	0	0	0	2	1	0
6	28	DF	(Austria) Kevin Wimmer	5	0	0	0	0	0	5	0	0
9	31	DF	(Germany) Waldemar Anton	4	0	0	0	0	0	4	0	0
10	23	GK	(Germany) Michael Esser	3	0	0	0	0	0	3	0	0
11	2	DF	(Croatia) Josip Elez	1	0	0	1	0	0	2	0	0
11	13	FW	(Togo) Ihlas Bebou	1	0	0	1	0	0	2	0	0
11	14	DF	(Germany) Kevin Akpoguma	2	0	0	0	0	0	2	0	0
11	21	FW	(Germany) Nicolai Müller	2	0	0	0	0	0	2	0	0
11	22	DF	(Germany) Matthias Ostrzolek	2	0	0	0	0	0	2	0	0
16	7	MF	(Germany) Edgar Prib	1	0	0	0	0	0	1	0	0
16	10	MF	(Japan) Genki Haraguchi	1	0	0	0	0	0	1	0	0
16	17	FW	(United States) Bobby Wood	1	0	0	0	0	0	1	0	0
16	24	FW	(Germany) Niclas Füllkrug	1	0	0	0	0	0	1	0	0
16	26	FW	(Germany) Hendrik Weydandt	1	0	0	0	0	0	1	0	0
16	33	FW	(Denmark) Uffe Bech	1	0	0	0	0	0	1	0	0
16	35	MF	(Germany) Florent Muslija	1	0	0	0	0	0	1	0	0
Total				57	3	1	4	0	0	61	3	1
