= Linton Maina =

German footballer

Personal information
- Full name: Linton Maina
- Date of birth: 23 June 1999 (age 27)
- Place of birth: Berlin, Germany
- Height: 1.73 m (5 ft 8 in)
- Position: Attacking midfielder

Team information
- Current team: 1. FC Köln
- Number: 37

Youth career
- 2003–2011: SV Pfefferwerk
- 2011–2014: SV Empor Berlin
- 2014–2018: Hannover 96

Senior career*
Years	Team	Apps	(Gls)
2018–2022	Hannover 96	91	(11)
2022–	1. FC Köln	123	(10)

International career^{‡}
2014–2015	Germany U16	3	(0)
2015	Germany U17	4	(0)
2016–2017	Germany U18	6	(1)
2017–2018	Germany U19	8	(1)
2018	Germany U20	1	(0)
- * Club domestic league appearances and goals as of 1 November 2026 ‡ National team caps and goals as of 17:51, 12 November 2018 (UTC)

Linton Maina (born 23 June 1999) is a German professional footballer who plays as an attacking midfielder for Bundesliga club 1. FC Köln.

== Career ==
Maina made his professional debut for Hannover 96 on 18 March 2018, coming on as a substitute for Marvin Bakalorz on matchday 27 of the 2017–18 season of the Bundesliga in a 0–1 away loss against Borussia Dortmund.

On 19 May 2022, it was announced that Maina would join Bundesliga side 1. FC Köln for the 2022–23 season on a free transfer. He signed a contract with the team until 2025.

== Personal life ==
Maina was born in Berlin to a Kenyan, Malagasy father and a German mother.

== Career statistics ==
As of match played 1 November 2026

Appearances and goals by club, season and competition
Club	Season	League			DFB-Pokal		Other		Total	
Club	Season	Division	Apps	Goals	Apps	Goals	Apps	Goals	Apps	Goals
Hannover 96	2017–18	Bundesliga	2	0	0	0	—		2	0
Hannover 96	2018–19	Bundesliga	20	1	1	0	—		21	1
Hannover 96	2019–20	2. Bundesliga	24	2	1	0	—		25	2
Hannover 96	2020–21	2. Bundesliga	18	2	1	0	—		19	2
Hannover 96	2021–22	2. Bundesliga	27	6	3	0	—		30	6
Hannover 96	Total		91	11	6	0	—		97	11
1. FC Köln	2022–23	Bundesliga	33	3	1	0	8 (Note: Appearances in UEFA Europa Conference League)	0	42	3
1. FC Köln	2023–24	Bundesliga	31	1	1	0	—		32	1
1. FC Köln	2024–25	2. Bundesliga	27	3	4	2	—		31	5
1. FC Köln	2025–26	Bundesliga	24	2	2	0	—		26	2
1. FC Köln	2026–27	Bundesliga	8	1	2	1	—		10	2
1. FC Köln	Total		123	10	10	3	8	0	141	13
Career total			214	21	17	3	8	0	238	24

== Honours ==
1.FC Koln

- 2.Bundesliga: 2024–25
