= Josip Elez =

Croatian footballer (born 1994)

Personal information
- Full name: Josip Elez
- Date of birth: 25 April 1994 (age 32)
- Place of birth: Split, Croatia
- Height: 1.90 m (6 ft 3 in)
- Position: Defender

Youth career
- 2004–2009: Solin
- 2009–2012: Hajduk Split

Senior career*
Years	Team	Apps	(Gls)
2012–2013	Hajduk Split	3	(0)
2013–2017	Lazio	0	(0)
2014–2015	→ Grosseto (loan)	15	(1)
2015	→ Honvéd (loan)	13	(0)
2015–2016	→ AGF (loan)	25	(2)
2016–2017	→ Rijeka (loan)	34	(2)
2017–2018	Rijeka	13	(0)
2018	→ Hannover 96 (loan)	11	(0)
2018–2021	Hannover 96	50	(0)
2021–2025	Hajduk Split	74	(2)
2026	Vukovar 1991	5	(0)

International career^{‡}
2009–2010	Croatia U16	4	(1)
2010–2011	Croatia U17	8	(1)
2011–2012	Croatia U19	3	(0)
2015–2016	Croatia U21	2	(0)
- * Club domestic league appearances and goals as of 15:33, 19 June 2026 (UTC) ‡ National team caps and goals as of 10 October 2016

Josip Elez (Croatian pronunciation: [jǒsip ělez]; born 25 April 1994) is a Croatian professional footballer who plays as a defender.

== Career ==
Elez started his career at NK Solin, his hometown club. At the age of 14 he moved to HNK Hajduk Split, where he spent five years as a youngster and also collected three first team caps in the Croatian First Football League.

In July 2013, age 19, Elez was transferred to S.S. Lazio for a fee €400,000. Elez spent the 2014–15 season on loan at Grosseto and Honvéd in Hungary, where he was a regular starter. He spent the following season on loan at Aarhus Gymnastikforening in Denmark, where he made 29 appearances and scored two goals. AGF were interested in keeping him at the club but were unable to agree a permanent move. In June 2016, Elez was sent to HNK Rijeka in Croatia on a season-long loan, with a buying option for €450,000. It was revealed in early May 2017 that HNK Rijeka exercised the buying option.

On 1 July 2017, Elez signed a three-year contract with HNK Rijeka, effectively tying him with the club until June 2020.

In January 2018, Elez was transferred to Hannover 96 on loan for the rest of the season. Hannover 96 was also given a buying option part of a transfer that would involve €3 million transfer fee.

Elez rejoined Hajduk Split for the 2021–22 season on a four-year contract. He scored his first goal for Hajduk Split against his former club Rijeka

== Career statistics ==
As of 1 July 2021

Appearances and goals by club, season and competition
Club	Season	League			Cup		Continental		Total	
Club	Season	Division	Apps	Goals	Apps	Goals	Apps	Goals	Apps	Goals
Hajduk Split	2011–12	1. HNL	1	0	0	0	0	0	1	0
Hajduk Split	2012–13	1. HNL	2	0	0	0	0	0	2	0
Hajduk Split	Total		3	0	0	0	0	0	3	0
Lazio	2013–14	Serie A	0	0	0	0	0	0	0	0
Grosseto (loan)	2014–15	Lega Pro	15	1	—		—		15	1
Honvéd (loan)	2014–15	Nemzeti Bajnokság I	13	0	1	0	—		14	0
AGF (loan)	2015–16	Superligaen	25	2	4	0	—		29	2
Rijeka (loan)	2016–17	1. HNL	34	2	4	0	2 (Note: Appearances in the Europa League)	0	40	2
Rijeka	2017–18	1. HNL	13	0	2	0	11 (Note: Six appearances in the Champions League, five appearances and two goals in the Europa League)	2	26	2
Rijeka	Total		47	2	6	0	13	2	66	4
Hannover 96	2017–18	Bundesliga	11	0	0	0	—		11	0
Hannover 96	2018–19	Bundesliga	10	0	1	0	—		11	0
Hannover 96	2019–20	2. Bundesliga	23	0	0	0	–		23	0
Hannover 96	2020–21	2. Bundesliga	17	0	0	0	–		17	0
Hannover 96	Total		61	0	1	0	0	0	662	0
Hajduk Split	2021–22	1. HNL	0	0	0	0	0	0	0	0
Career total			164	5	12	0	13	2	189	7

== Honours ==
HNK Rijeka

- Croatian First Football League: 2016–17
- Croatian Football Cup: 2016–17

Hajduk Split

- Croatian Football Cup: 2021–22
