= Michael Esser =

German footballer

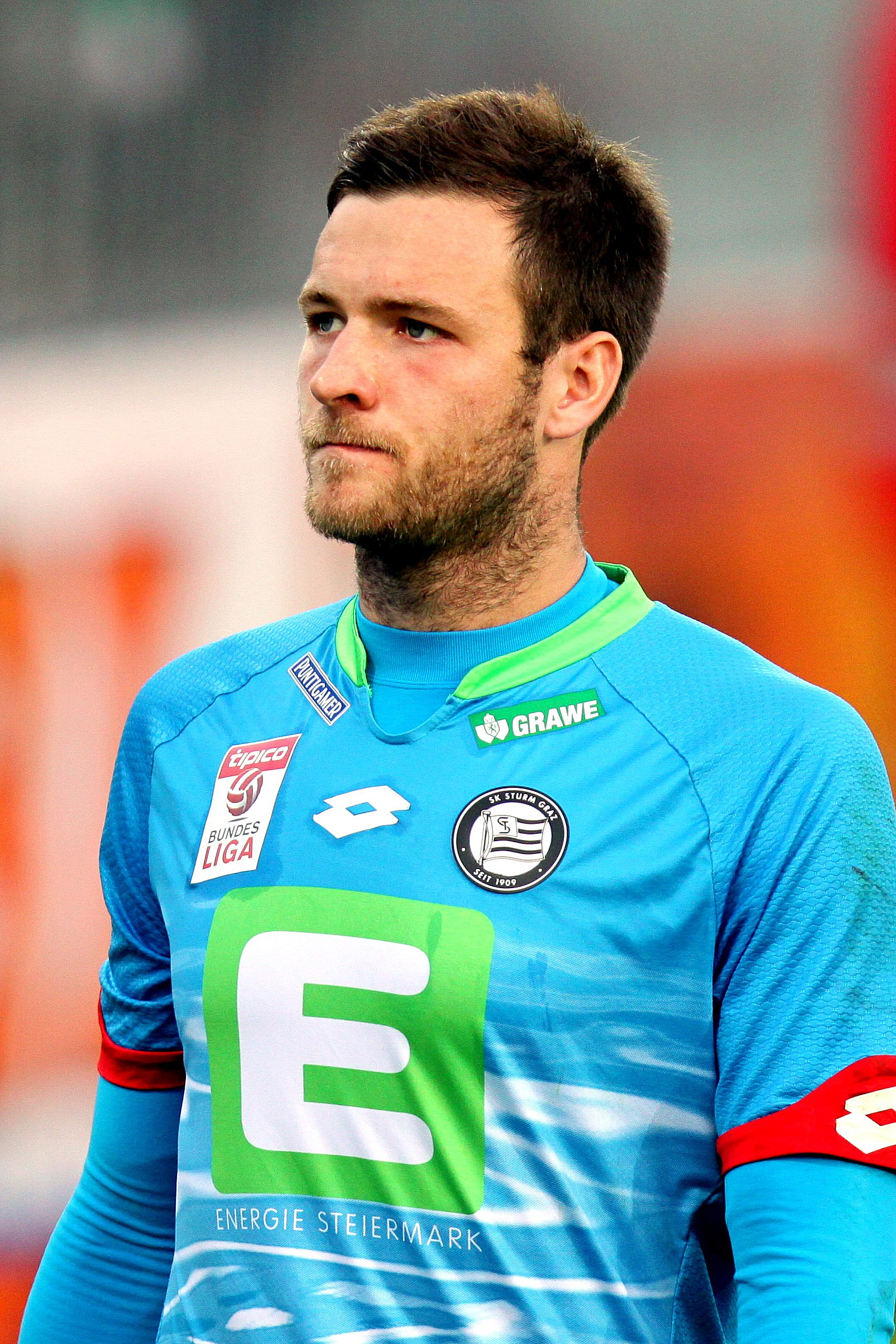
- Esser with Sturm Graz in 2015

Personal information
- Date of birth: 22 November 1987 (age 38)
- Place of birth: Castrop-Rauxel, West Germany
- Height: 1.98 m (6 ft 6 in)
- Position: Goalkeeper

Youth career
- 1993–1997: VfR Rauxel
- 1997–1999: VfB Habinghorst
- 1999–2001: VfL Bochum
- 2001–2004: SpVgg Erkenschwick
- 2004–2006: VfB Habinghorst

Senior career*
Years	Team	Apps	(Gls)
2005–2006	VfB Habinghorst		
2006–2007	SV Wacker Obercastrop		
2007–2008	SV Sodingen		
2008–2014	VfL Bochum II	55	(0)
2010–2015	VfL Bochum	24	(0)
2015–2016	Sturm Graz	36	(0)
2016–2017	Darmstadt 98	28	(0)
2017–2019	Hannover 96	36	(0)
2020	1899 Hoffenheim	0	(0)
2020–2021	Hannover 96	29	(0)
2021–2024	VfL Bochum	3	(0)
- * Club domestic league appearances and goals

Michael Esser (born 22 November 1987) is a German former professional footballer who played as a goalkeeper.

== Career statistics ==
As of match played 21 June 2021

Appearances and goals by club, season and competition
Club	Season	League			Cup		Continental		Other		Total	
Club	Season	Division	Apps	Goals	Apps	Goals	Apps	Goals	Apps	Goals	Apps	Goals
VfB Habinghorst	2005–06	Bezirksliga Westfalen			—		—		—			
SV Wacker Obercastrop	2006–07	Bezirksliga Westfalen			—		—		—			
SV Sodingen	2007–08	Landesliga Westfalen			—		—		—			
VfL Bochum II	2008–09	Regionalliga West	1	0	—		—		—		1	0
VfL Bochum II	2009–10	Regionalliga West	16	0	—		—		—		16	0
VfL Bochum II	2010–11	Regionalliga West	17	0	—		—		—		17	0
VfL Bochum II	2011–12	Regionalliga West	6	0	—		—		—		6	0
VfL Bochum II	2012–13	Regionalliga West	2	0	—		—		—		2	0
VfL Bochum II	2013–14	Regionalliga West	12	0	—		—		—		12	0
VfL Bochum II	2014–15	Regionalliga West	1	0	—		—		—		1	0
VfL Bochum II	Total		55	0	—		—		—		55	0
VfL Bochum	2010–11	2. Bundesliga	0	0	0	0	—		0 (Note: Appearances in the 2. Bundesliga promotion play-offs)	0	0	0
VfL Bochum	2011–12	2. Bundesliga	1	0	0	0	—		—		1	0
VfL Bochum	2012–13	2. Bundesliga	3	0	1	0	—		—		4	0
VfL Bochum	2013–14	2. Bundesliga	4	0	0	0	—		—		4	0
VfL Bochum	2014–15	2. Bundesliga	16	0	0	0	—		—		16	0
VfL Bochum	Total		24	0	1	0	0	0	0	0	25	0
Sturm Graz	2015–16	Austrian Bundesliga	36	0	3	0	2 (Note: Appearances in the Europa League.)	0	—		41	0
Darmstadt 98	2016–17	Bundesliga	28	0	2	0	—		—		30	0
Hannover 96	2017–18	Bundesliga	3	0	1	0	—		—		4	0
Hannover 96	2018–19	Bundesliga	32	0	1	0	—		—		33	0
Hannover 96	2019–20	2. Bundesliga	1	0	0	0	—		—		1	0
Hannover 96	Total		36	0	2	0	—		—		38	0
1899 Hoffenheim	2019–20	Bundesliga	0	0	0	0	—		—		0	0
Hannover 96	2020–21	2. Bundesliga	29	0	1	0	—		—		30	0
VfL Bochum	2021–22	Bundesliga	3	0	1	0	—		—		4	0
VfL Bochum	2022–23	Bundesliga	0	0	0	0	—		—		0	0
VfL Bochum	2023–24	Bundesliga	0	0	0	0	—		0	0	0	0
VfL Bochum	Total		3	0	1	0	—		0	0	4	0
Career totals			211	0	10	0	2	0	0	0	233	0
