= Marvin Bakalorz =

German footballer

Personal information
- Full name: Marvin Dirk Bakalorz
- Date of birth: 13 September 1989 (age 37)
- Place of birth: Offenbach am Main, West Germany
- Height: 1.80 m (5 ft 11 in)
- Position: Midfielder

Youth career
- TGS Jügesheim
- TSV Raesfeld
- Westfalia Gemen
- 2004–2008: Preußen Münster

Senior career*
Years	Team	Apps	(Gls)
2008–2010	Preußen Münster	34	(1)
2010–2013	Borussia Dortmund II	84	(13)
2011–2013	Borussia Dortmund	0	(0)
2013–2014	Eintracht Frankfurt II	6	(0)
2013–2014	Eintracht Frankfurt	3	(0)
2014–2016	SC Paderborn	75	(4)
2016–2020	Hannover 96	102	(2)
2020–2021	Denizlispor	31	(1)
2021–2024	MSV Duisburg	69	(3)
- * Club domestic league appearances and goals as of 18:18, 4 July 2024 (UTC)

Marvin Dirk Bakalorz (born 13 September 1989) is a German professional footballer most recently who played as a midfielder for MSV Duisburg.

== Career ==
In May 2016, Bakalorz joined Hannover 96 on a free transfer from SC Paderborn. He left the club in August 2020 having agreed the termination of his contract which was due to expire in summer 2022.

After playing one season for Turkish club Denizlispor, German 3. Liga side MSV Duisburg announced the signing of Bakalorz in late May 2021, starting with the new season.

== Career statistics ==
As of 12 May 2024

Appearances and goals by club, season and competition
Club	Season	League			Cup		Continental		Total	
Club	Season	Division	Apps	Goals	Apps	Goals	Apps	Goals	Apps	Goals
Preußen Münster	2008–09	Regionalliga West	18	0	—		—		18	0
Preußen Münster	2009–10	Regionalliga West	16	1	—		—		15	1
Preußen Münster	Total		34	1	—		—		34	1
Borussia Dortmund II	2010–11	Regionalliga West	29	4	—		—		29	4
Borussia Dortmund II	2011–12	Regionalliga West	24	3	—		—		24	3
Borussia Dortmund II	2012–13	3. Liga	31	6	—		—		31	6
Borussia Dortmund II	Total		84	13	—		—		84	13
Eintracht Frankfurt	2013–14	Bundesliga	3	0	—		1 (Note: Appearance in Europa League)	0	4	0
Eintracht Frankfurt II	2013–14	Regionalliga Südwest	6	0	—		—		6	0
SC Paderborn	2013–14	2. Bundesliga	15	2	—		—		15	2
SC Paderborn	2014–15	Bundesliga	29	1	1	0	—		30	1
SC Paderborn	2015–16	2. Bundesliga	31	1	2	0	—		33	1
SC Paderborn	Total		75	4	3	0	—		78	4
Hannover 96	2016–17	2. Bundesliga	30	0	2	0	—		32	0
Hannover 96	2017–18	Bundesliga	28	0	2	0	—		30	0
Hannover 96	2018–19	Bundesliga	25	1	—		—		25	1
Hannover 96	2019–20	2. Bundesliga	19	1	1	0	—		20	1
Hannover 96	Total		102	2	5	0	—		107	2
Denizlispor	2020–21	Süper Lig	31	1	1	0	—		32	1
MSV Duisburg	2021–22	3. Liga	25	0	—		—		25	0
MSV Duisburg	2022–23	3. Liga	30	3	—		—		30	3
MSV Duisburg	2023–24	3. Liga	14	0	—		—		14	0
MSV Duisburg	Total		69	3	0	0	—		69	3
Career total			404	24	9	0	1	0	414	24
