= Benjamin Hadžić =

German-born Bosnian footballer

Personal information
- Date of birth: 4 March 1999 (age 27)
- Place of birth: Dinslaken, Germany
- Height: 1.85 m (6 ft 1 in)
- Position: Forward

Youth career
- 2010–2012: FC Ingolstadt
- 2012–2013: 1. FC Nürnberg
- 2013–2017: Bayern Munich
- 2017–2018: VfB Stuttgart

Senior career*
Years	Team	Apps	(Gls)
2018–2020	Hannover 96 II	42	(10)
2018–2019	Hannover 96	3	(0)
2020–2022	Austria Klagenfurt	31	(4)
2022–2023	1. FC Schweinfurt 05	23	(10)
2023–2024	Kickers Offenbach	13	(1)
2024–2025	Hessen Kassel	26	(6)
2025–2026	Metaloglobus București	8	(0)

International career
2016	Bosnia and Herzegovina U17	6	(2)
2016–2018	Bosnia and Herzegovina U19	17	(4)
2019	Bosnia and Herzegovina U21	4	(0)
- * Club domestic league appearances and goals as of 20 December 2025

Benjamin Hadžić (born 4 March 1999) is a professional footballer who plays as a forward.

== Club career ==
Hadžić joined the youth sector of Bayern Munich in 2013 from 1. FC Nürnberg. For the 2017/18 season he moved to VfB Stuttgart. In June 2018 he completed a trial with the Austrian Bundesliga club SCR Altach, but was not signed.

In August 2018 he moved to Hannover 96, where he was registered for the clubs reserve team. Hadžić made his professional debut for Hannover 96 in the Bundesliga on 19 December 2018, coming on as a substitute in the 80th minute for Hendrik Weydandt in the 1–1 away draw against SC Freiburg. By the end of the season he made three appearances in the Bundesliga and 25 for the Regionalliga team.

In the 2019–20 season he was only used for the reserve team and therefore, he moved to the Austrian 2. Liga club Austria Klagenfurt in February 2020, with whom he received a contract that ran until June 2022.

== International career ==
Hadžić was included in Bosnia and Herzegovina's squad for the 2016 UEFA European Under-17 Championship in Azerbaijan. He scored twice in their third match against Ukraine, which finished as a 2–1 win. However, Bosnia and Herzegovina were eliminated in the group stage of the tournament.
