= Ihlas Bebou =

Togolese footballer (born 1994)

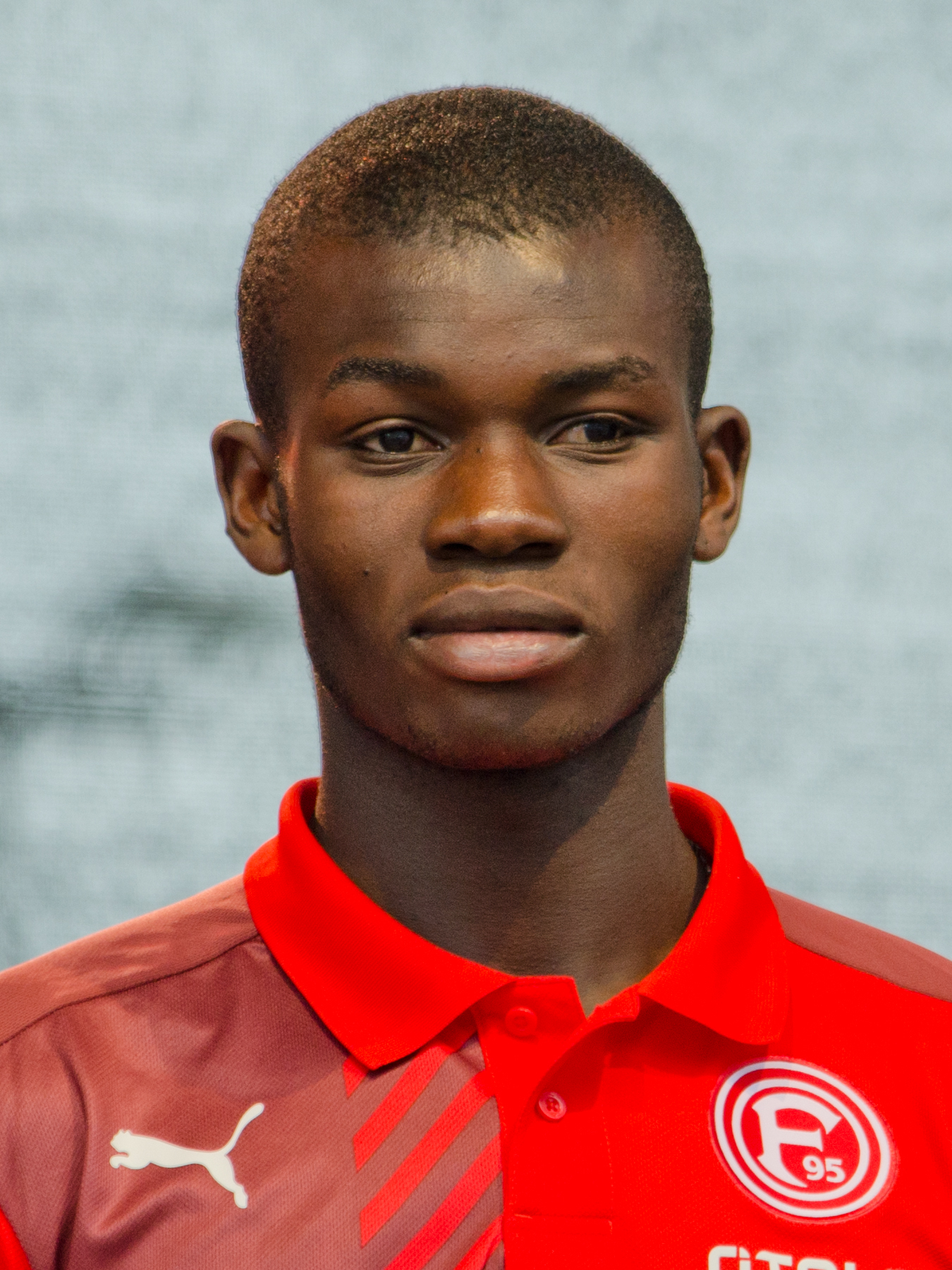
- Bebou with Fortuna Düsseldorf in 2015

Personal information
- Date of birth: 23 April 1994 (age 32)
- Place of birth: Sokodé, Togo
- Height: 1.83 m (6 ft 0 in)
- Positions: Right winger; centre-forward

Youth career
- 2004–2009: Garather SV
- 2009–2011: VfB 03 Hilden
- 2011–2015: Fortuna Düsseldorf

Senior career*
Years	Team	Apps	(Gls)
2013–2015	Fortuna Düsseldorf II	12	(5)
2015–2017	Fortuna Düsseldorf	70	(11)
2017–2019	Hannover 96	42	(9)
2019–2026	TSG Hoffenheim	159	(36)

International career^{‡}
2016–	Togo	38	(1)
- * Club domestic league appearances and goals as of 4 April 2026 ‡ National team caps and goals as of 9 June 2024

Ihlas Bebou (born 23 April 1994) is a Togolese professional footballer who plays as a forward or right winger for Togo national team.

== Club career ==
Bebou started playing football at Garather SV and VfB Hilden before joining Fortuna Düsseldorf in 2011. In December 2016 and June 2017, he rejected contract extensions with his current contract running out in 2018.

On 31 August 2017, the last day of the German summer transfer window, Bebou joined Bundesliga side Hannover.

On 16 May 2019, it was confirmed, that Bebou would join TSG Hoffenheim from the upcoming season. He penned a four-year contract.

== International career ==
Bebou debuted for the Togo national team in a 5–0 win over Djibouti on 4 September 2016.

== Career statistics ==
=== Club ===
As of match played 4 April 2026

Appearances and goals by club, season and competition
Club	Season	League			DFB-Pokal		Europe		Total	
Club	Season	Division	Apps	Goals	Apps	Goals	Apps	Goals	Apps	Goals
Fortuna Düsseldorf II	2012–13	Regionalliga West	7	1	—		—		7	1
Fortuna Düsseldorf II	2013–14	Regionalliga West	5	4	—		—		5	4
Fortuna Düsseldorf II	2014–15	Regionalliga West	2	0	—		—		2	0
Fortuna Düsseldorf II	2015–16	Regionalliga West	4	1	—		—		4	1
Fortuna Düsseldorf II	Total		18	6	—		—		18	6
Fortuna Düsseldorf	2013–14	2. Bundesliga	1	0	—		—		1	0
Fortuna Düsseldorf	2014–15	2. Bundesliga	10	2	—		—		10	2
Fortuna Düsseldorf	2015–16	2. Bundesliga	23	2	1	0	—		24	2
Fortuna Düsseldorf	2016–17	2. Bundesliga	32	5	2	1	—		34	6
Fortuna Düsseldorf	2017–18	2. Bundesliga	4	2	1	0	—		5	2
Fortuna Düsseldorf	Total		70	11	4	1	—		74	12
Hannover 96	2017–18	Bundesliga	30	5	1	0	—		31	5
Hannover 96	2018–19	Bundesliga	12	4	2	1	—		14	5
Hannover 96	Total		42	9	3	1	—		45	10
TSG Hoffenheim	2019–20	Bundesliga	32	6	3	1	—		35	7
TSG Hoffenheim	2020–21	Bundesliga	32	9	2	0	6 (Note: Appearances in UEFA Europa League)	0	40	9
TSG Hoffenheim	2021–22	Bundesliga	28	7	1	0	—		29	7
TSG Hoffenheim	2022–23	Bundesliga	19	7	1	0	—		20	7
TSG Hoffenheim	2023–24	Bundesliga	32	7	2	0	—		34	7
TSG Hoffenheim	2024–25	Bundesliga	1	0	0	0	—		1	0
TSG Hoffenheim	2025–26	Bundesliga	16	0	1	0	—		17	0
TSG Hoffenheim	Total		160	36	10	1	6	0	176	37
Career total			290	62	16	3	6	0	312	65

=== International ===
As of match played 9 June 2024

Appearances and goals by national team and year
National team	Year	Apps	Goals
Togo	2016	3	0
Togo	2017	9	0
Togo	2018	3	0
Togo	2019	4	1
Togo	2020	3	0
Togo	2021	6	0
Togo	2023	6	0
Togo	2024	4	0
Total		38	1

Scores and results list Togo's goal tally first.

No.	Date	Venue	Opponent	Score	Result	Competition
1.	10 October 2019	Stade Parsemain, Fos-sur-Mer, France	Cape Verde	1–0	1–2	Friendly
