= Jonathas de Jesus =

Brazilian footballer

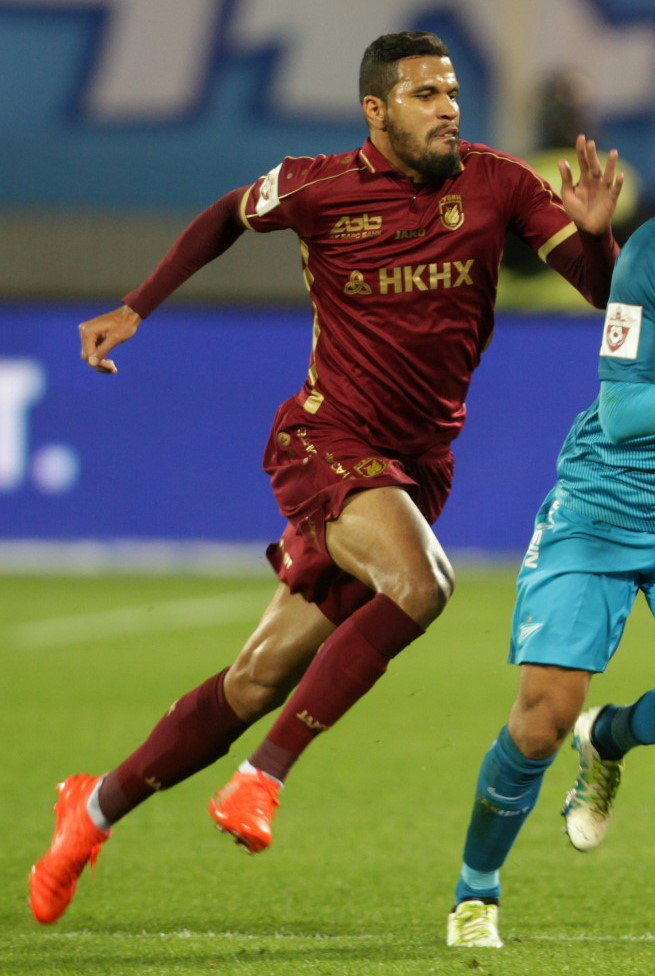
- Jonathas playing for Rubin Kazan in 2016

Personal information
- Full name: Jonathas Cristian de Jesus
- Date of birth: 6 March 1989 (age 37)
- Place of birth: Betim, Brazil
- Height: 1.90 m (6 ft 3 in)
- Position: Striker

Team information
- Current team: Athletic

Youth career
- 2000–2006: Cruzeiro
- 2006: AZ

Senior career*
Years	Team	Apps	(Gls)
2006–2008	Cruzeiro	2	(0)
2007	→ Ipatinga (loan)	5	(0)
2008	→ Villa Nova (loan)	0	(0)
2009–2010	AZ	23	(7)
2010–2012	Brescia	41	(18)
2012–2014	Pescara	14	(1)
2012–2013	→ Torino (loan)	11	(2)
2013–2014	→ Latina (loan)	37	(15)
2014–2015	Elche	34	(14)
2015–2016	Real Sociedad	29	(7)
2016–2017	Rubin Kazan	35	(15)
2017–2019	Hannover 96	24	(6)
2018	→ Corinthians (loan)	7	(1)
2020	Elche	14	(7)
2020	Al-Sharjah	0	(0)
2021	→ Hatta (loan)	10	(6)
2021–2022	Odisha	16	(8)
2022	Náutico	7	(0)
2023	Inter de Limeira	11	(1)
2024–	Athletic	15	(14)

International career
2008	Brazil U19	3	(3)
- * Club domestic league appearances and goals as of 25 May 2024

Jonathas Cristian de Jesus (born 6 March 1989), sometimes known as just Jonathas, is a Brazilian professional footballer who plays as a striker for Athletic.

In his career, he played top-flight football in his own country, the Netherlands, Italy, Spain, Russia, Germany and India. He recorded figures of 61 games and 21 goals in La Liga for Elche and Real Sociedad.

== Club career ==
=== Early career ===
Jonathas de Jesus played in Cruzeiro's youth teams and a few times in the senior team. He was also loaned out to Ipatinga and Villa Nova.

In October 2008 he was signed by Dutch Eredivisie champions, AZ Alkmaar. Cruzeiro announced that AZ bought 65% player's rights for €600,000 and the Brazilian club retained the rest.

Jonathas de Jesus made his debut for AZ on 28 October 2009, in the KNVB Cup match against Spakenburg, scoring in a 5–2 away win. On 21 November, he played his first league game away to Roda JC, and scored in a 4–2 win before being sent off for hitting an opponent with his arm.

On 1 February 2011, Jonathas de Jesus moved teams and countries again, joining Brescia Calcio in a one-and-a-half-year contract for and undisclosed fee, rumoured to be €300,000. He appeared in six matches during his debut campaign, as the Biancoazzurri were relegated from Serie A. He scored 16 goals in the 2011–12 Serie B, the team's top scorer.

=== Pescara ===
On 31 July 2012, newly promoted Serie A side Pescara announced that they had signed Jonathas for an undisclosed fee. He played his first match on 26 August in a 0–3 loss to Inter Milan, and scored his first goal on 6 January of the following year, in a 2–0 win at Fiorentina.

On 31 January 2013 Jonathas de Jesus moved to Torino on loan until June, with a buyout clause. On 29 August he joined Latina in a permanent one-year deal.

After scoring 15 goals with Latina (who missed out promotion in the play-offs), Jonathas returned to Pescara.

Immediately after returning to Pescara, Jonathas de Jesus was loaned to Elche CF in La Liga, for two seasons. He made his debut in the main category of Spanish football on 24 August 2014, starting in a 0–3 loss at FC Barcelona.

Jonathas de Jesus scored his first goal in the category on 14 September 2014, netting his side's second in a 3–2 away win against Rayo Vallecano. On 2 November, he scored Elche's goals in a 2–1 home win against RCD Espanyol, taking his tally up to five.

On 20 April 2015, after scoring the winner in a home success against Real Sociedad, Jonathas became the first player of the Valencians to score 10 goals in a La Liga campaign since 1977–78.

=== Real Sociedad ===
On 27 July 2015, Jonathas de Jesus moved to fellow league team Real Sociedad, after agreeing to a five-year deal. He scored seven times in his only season in San Sebastián, including braces in wins against Valencia (2–0 at home) and RCD Espanyol (5–0 away) at the start of the new year.

Jonathas de Jesus was sent off on 18 October 2015 at the end of a 2–0 loss to Atlético Madrid at the Anoeta Stadium, joining teammate Diego Reyes in expulsion.

=== Rubin Kazan ===
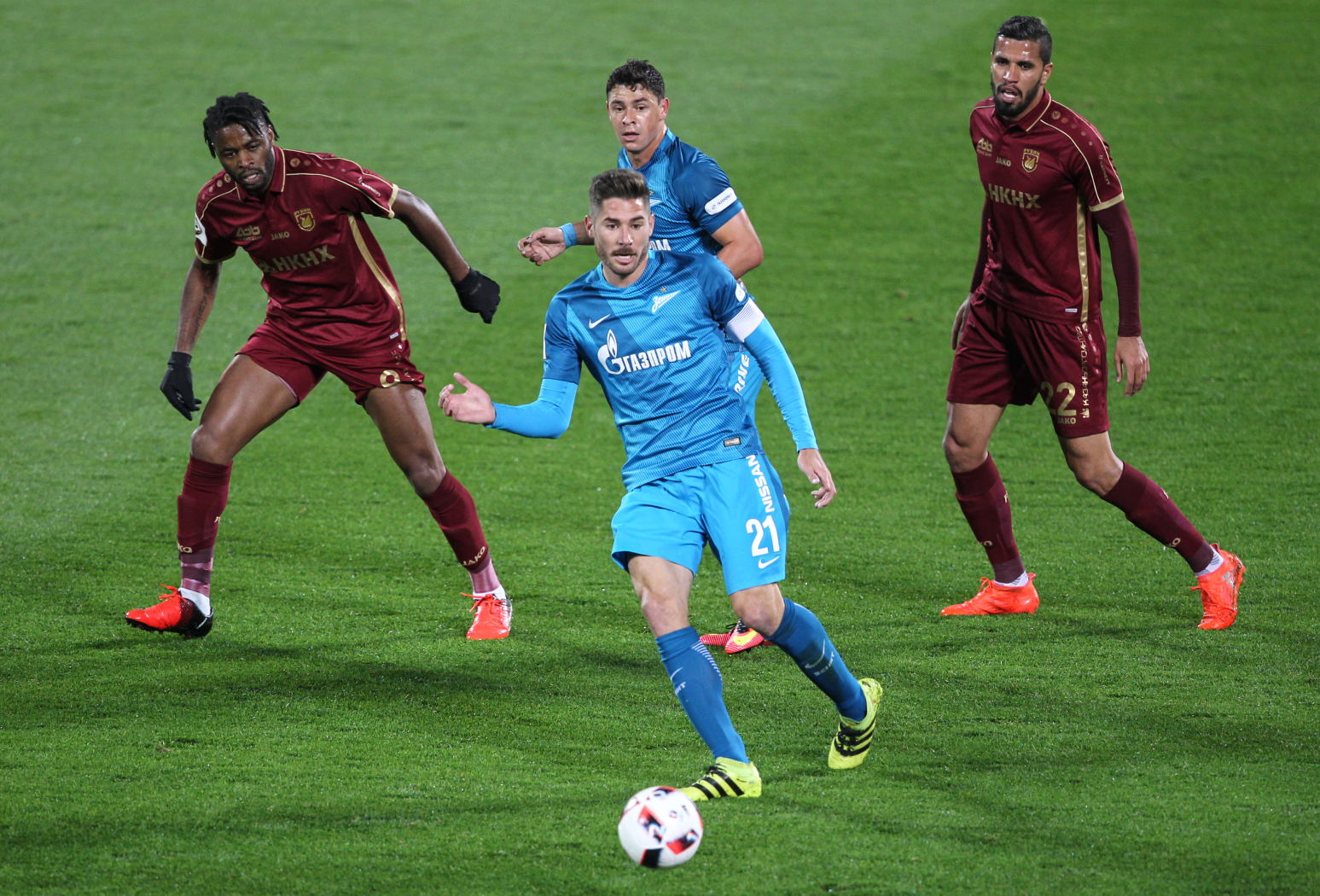
Jonathas (furthest right) playing against Zenit in September 2016

On 29 July 2016, Rubin Kazan reached an agreement with Real Sociedad for the transfer of Jonathas. The fee was reported as €7 million.

=== Hannover 96 ===
On 22 August 2017, Jonathas de Jesus signed a three-year contract with the German club Hannover 96. Five days later he scored on his debut, the only goal of a home win over FC Schalke 04.

On 29 June 2018, he joined Brazilian club Corinthians on a year-long deal. He played nine total games, and scored a late consolation on 22 July at the end of a 3–1 loss away to city rivals São Paulo FC. Corinthians terminated the loan on 15 January 2019.

On 4 May 2019, Jonathas de Jesus came on as a half-time substitute for Hendrik Weydandt for relegation-threatened Hannover away to leaders FC Bayern Munich. In his ten-minute cameo, he scored a penalty given by the video assistant referee, and was sent off for two yellow cards. His contract was terminated on 31 August that year.

=== Return to Elche ===
On 31 January 2020, Jonathas de Jesus returned to his former club Elche, now in Segunda División. Weeks later, he tested positive for COVID-19 on 15 March, during the coronavirus pandemic in Spain.

=== Sharjah ===
On 29 August 2020, Sharjah signs Brazilian Jonathas de Jesus.

=== Odisha FC ===
On 10 September 2021, Indian Super League side Odisha FC signed him for a two-year term ahead of their 2021–22 campaign. He debuted for the club on 24 November in a 3–1 win over Bengaluru FC. He had 8 goals and 4 assists in his first year in India.

== International career ==
Jonathas de Jesus played for the Brazilian under-19 team at 2008 Sendai Cup, where he scored three goals in the same number of matches.
