= Kevin Wimmer =

Austrian footballer (born 1992)

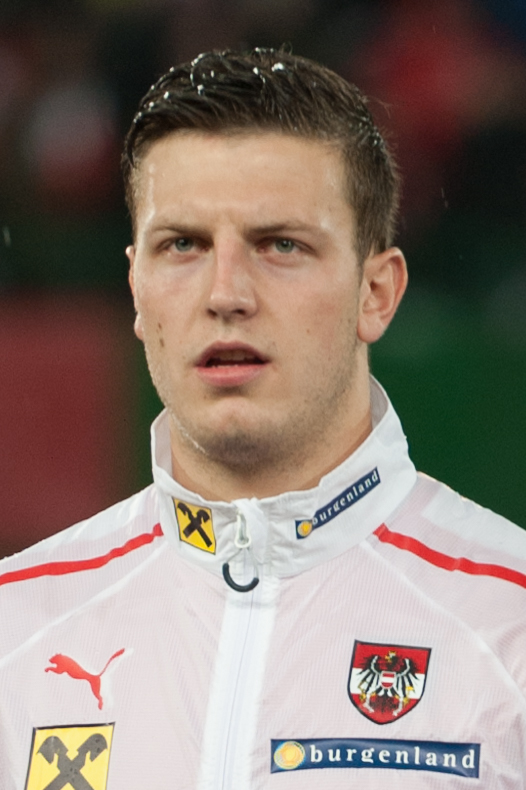
- Wimmer with Austria in 2015

Personal information
- Full name: Kevin Wimmer
- Date of birth: 15 November 1992 (age 33)
- Place of birth: Wels, Upper Austria, Austria
- Height: 1.87 m (6 ft 2 in)
- Position: Centre back

Team information
- Current team: Slovan Bratislava
- Number: 6

Youth career
- 1998–2000: FC Edt
- 2000–2010: Fußballakademie Linz
- 2010–2011: LASK

Senior career*
Years	Team	Apps	(Gls)
2010–2011	LASK II	20	(0)
2011–2012	LASK	28	(4)
2012–2015	1. FC Köln	73	(2)
2013	1. FC Köln II	3	(0)
2015–2017	Tottenham Hotspur	15	(0)
2017–2021	Stoke City	17	(0)
2018–2019	→ Hannover 96 (loan)	22	(0)
2019–2020	→ Mouscron (loan)	17	(0)
2021	→ Karlsruher SC (loan)	10	(0)
2021–2023	Rapid Wien	30	(1)
2023–	Slovan Bratislava	67	(1)

International career
2010	Austria U18	2	(0)
2012–2014	Austria U21	10	(0)
2013–2018	Austria	9	(0)
- * Club domestic league appearances and goals as of 31 October 2026

Kevin Wimmer (German pronunciation: [ˈkɛvɪn ˈvɪmɐ]; born 15 November 1992) is an Austrian professional footballer who plays as a centre back for Slovan Bratislava.

Wimmer began his professional career with LASK where his performances earned him a move to German club 1. FC Köln in June 2012. In the 2013–14 season, Wimmer helped Köln set a new 2. Bundesliga record, conceding only 20 goals as they earned promotion to the Bundesliga. After a solid first season in the German top flight he moved to Premier League side Tottenham Hotspur for a fee of £4.3 million. However his playing time under Mauricio Pochettino at White Hart Lane was restricted due to the form of Toby Alderweireld and Jan Vertonghen. After two seasons in North London, Wimmer joined Stoke City in August 2017 for a fee of £18 million. After several poor performances, he struggled for game time at Stoke and joined Hannover 96 on loan for the 2018–19 season, Belgian side Royal Excel Mouscron in 2019–20 and Karlsruher SC in 2020–21.

== Club career ==
=== 1. FC Köln ===
In June 2012, Wimmer moved from Austrian side LASK to German club 1. FC Köln for a €250,000 transfer fee. On 5 August 2012, he made his debut in a 1–0 loss to Eintracht Braunschweig. He went on to become a regular in Köln's defence. On 29 November 2013, Wimmer scored his first goal in a 3–0 win over FC St. Pauli.

In the 2013–14 season, Wimmer helped the club set a 2. Bundesliga record, conceding only 20 goals as they earned promotion to the Bundesliga. Wimmer continued his good performances in Germany's top division to help Köln stay in the Bundesliga, managing to avoid defeat against every team, save for Bayern Munich and SC Freiburg, at least once. The team played a Bundesliga record nine 0–0 draws, equalling Bayern Munich's 1966 Bundesliga record of not conceding a goal in 13 matches. In the 2014–15 season, Wimmer started 32 matches and was named the seventh-best defender in the league by football magazine Kicker.

=== Tottenham Hotspur ===
On 29 May 2015, Wimmer joined Premier League side Tottenham Hotspur on a five-year contract for a reported £4.3 million transfer fee. On 30 July, he made his Tottenham debut against the MLS All-Stars in a 2–1 defeat in Denver, Colorado. Wimmer replaced captain Jan Vertonghen after 45 minutes and made his debut alongside fellow new signings Dele Alli, Kieran Trippier and Toby Alderweireld.

On 4 August 2015, Wimmer made his first start for the club in a 2–0 defeat to Real Madrid in the Audi Cup, played in Munich, and was replaced by Jan Vertonghen after 46 minutes. Wimmer was limited to scant cup appearances and squad namings to start the season, mainly due to the strong central defense partnership between Vertonghen and Alderweireld. With a loan out of the club a potential possibility, manager Mauricio Pochettino elected to keep Wimmer, citing a need for depth in defense in case of an injury. Such an opportunity arose, as Wimmer finally got his breakthrough when he made his first league appearance of the 2015–16 Premier League season on 23 January 2016, coming on as a substitute for an injured Vertonghen in a 3–1 win over Crystal Palace. With Vertonghen ruled out for about two months, Wimmer was set for an extended run as his replacement in both the Premier League and the Europa League knockout stages. Wimmer impressed as Vertonghen's replacement, making 15 starts across all competitions before Vertonghen returned against Manchester United on 10 April. In the 9 league starts made by Wimmer, Tottenham only gave up six goals as they reached second place in the table. After the season, Wimmer signed a new five-year contract, keeping him at Tottenham until the summer of 2021.

Despite heading into the 2016–17 season with "different expectations" on the heels of his first season, Wimmer was once again on the bench to start the year, not helped by a preseason thigh injury. After telling the Austrian paper Kleine Zeitung in October that he was waiting "patiently for his chance", an injury to Toby Alderweireld opened up the door for Wimmer, but it was initially Eric Dier who took his spot at centre-back. A second injury was necessary for Wimmer to crack the lineup, and it was Dele Alli who suffered this time. Wimmer appeared for the first time in the Premier League that season on 6 November against bitter rivals Arsenal as the lone centre-back in a three-man back line that was used for the first time by manager Mauricio Pochettino that season. In the derby, Wimmer scored an own goal attempting to defend a whipping Mesut Özil free kick in a 1–1 draw.

=== Stoke City ===
Wimmer signed for Stoke City on 28 August 2017, for a fee of £18 million. Manager Mark Hughes said that "Bringing Kevin here is a real coup in my view, because he is a hugely talented young player who will undoubtedly add further quality to the group...There is a lot of money being spent this summer, so for us to get a player of Kevin’s calibre through the door for the price we have paid, in my opinion, is something we will really appreciate for years to come". He made his Stoke debut on 9 September 2017 in a 2–2 draw against Manchester United. Wimmer made a poor start to his Stoke career and came in for much criticism from supporters for his performance in a heavy defeat at Manchester City.

Wimmer's performances failed to improve and he was placed on a special fitness regime by new manager Paul Lambert. Wimmer failed to play at all under Lambert, as Stoke suffered relegation to the EFL Championship. Wimmer was branded a 'flop' by Stoke supporters and it was reported that the club would be willing to take a substantial loss on him in the summer. Wimmer joined Bundesliga club Hannover 96 on loan in May 2018 with the option of a permanent transfer. Wimmer played 24 games for Hannover as the side finished in 17th position and were relegated to the 2. Bundesliga. He did not play enough matches to trigger a permanent transfer.

On 31 August 2019, Wimmer joined Belgian Belgian First Division A side Royal Excel Mouscron on loan for the 2019–20 season. He made 18 appearances for Mouscron until the Belgian season was ended early in April 2020 due to the COVID-19 pandemic with Mouscron in 10th position.

On 1 February 2021, Wimmer joined German side Karlsruher SC on loan for the remainder of the 2020–21 season.

=== Rapid Wien ===
On 28 May 2021, it was announced that Wimmer had his contract with Stoke terminated so he was able to move to SK Rapid Wien on a free transfer.

=== Slovan Bratislava ===
Wimmer departed Rapid Wien upon the expiry of his contract. On 8 June 2023, Slovan Bratislava announced the signing of Wimmer. On 18 September 2024, Wimmer scored his first goal for Slovan Bratislava in the 60th minute of a UEFA Champions League league phase match against Celtic.

== International career ==
Wimmer debuted for the Austrian senior squad on 15 November 2013, coming on as a substitute in a 1–0 victory against the United States. He represented his country at UEFA Euro 2016.

== Career statistics ==
=== Club ===
As of match played 3 November 2026

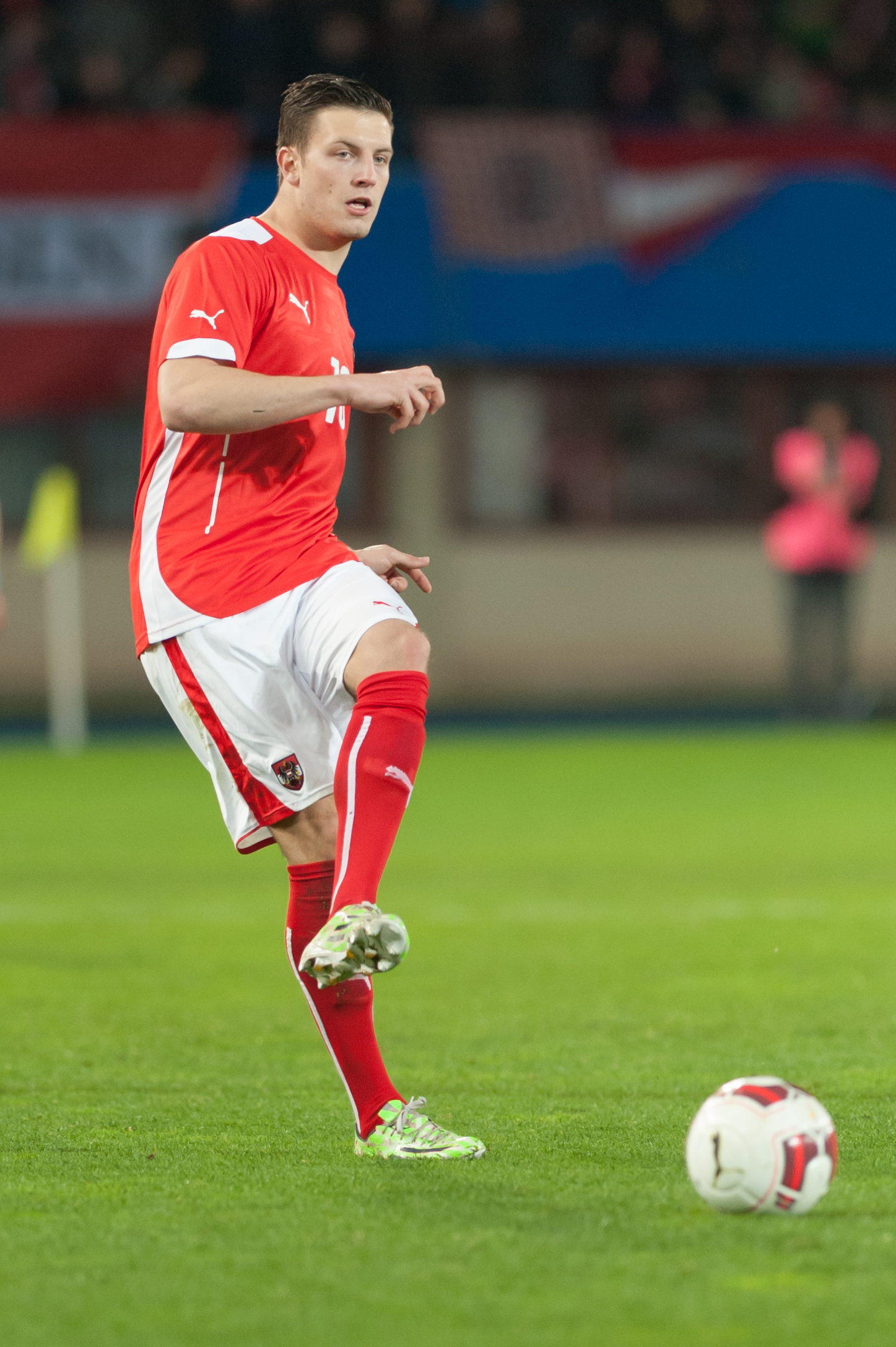
Wimmer playing for Austria in March 2015

Appearances and goals by club, season and competition
Club	Season	League			Cup		League Cup		Europe		Total	
Club	Season	Division	Apps	Goals	Apps	Goals	Apps	Goals	Apps	Goals	Apps	Goals
LASK II	2010–11	Regionalliga Mitte	20	0	—		—		—		20	0
LASK	2011–12	Erste Liga	28	4	3	0	—		—		31	4
1. FC Köln	2012–13	2. Bundesliga	9	0	2	0	—		—		11	0
1. FC Köln	2013–14	2. Bundesliga	26	2	2	0	—		—		28	2
1. FC Köln	2014–15	Bundesliga	32	0	2	0	—		—		34	0
1. FC Köln	Total		67	2	6	0	—		—		73	2
1. FC Köln II	2012–13	Regionalliga West	3	0	—		—		—		3	0
Tottenham Hotspur	2015–16	Premier League	10	0	4	0	1	0	6 (Note: Appearances in UEFA Europa League)	0	21	0
Tottenham Hotspur	2016–17	Premier League	5	0	2	0	2	0	1 (Note: Appearances in UEFA Champions League)	0	10	0
Tottenham Hotspur	Total		15	0	6	0	3	0	7	0	31	0
Stoke City	2017–18	Premier League	17	0	1	0	1	0	—		19	0
Stoke City	2018–19	Championship	0	0	0	0	0	0	—		0	0
Stoke City	2019–20	Championship	0	0	0	0	0	0	—		0	0
Stoke City	2020–21	Championship	0	0	0	0	0	0	—		0	0
Stoke City	Total		17	0	1	0	1	0	—		19	0
Hannover 96 (loan)	2018–19	Bundesliga	22	0	2	1	—		—		24	1
Mouscron (loan)	2019–20	Belgian First Division A	17	0	1	0	—		—		18	0
Karlsruher SC (loan)	2020–21	2. Bundesliga	10	0	0	0	—		—		10	0
Rapid Vienna	2021–22	Austrian Bundesliga	20	1	1	0	—		9 (Note: Two appearances in UEFA Champions League, two appearances in UEFA Europa League and five appearances in UEFA Europa Conference League)	0	30	1
Rapid Vienna	2022–23	Austrian Bundesliga	10	0	4	1	—		6 (Note: Appearances in UEFA Europa Conference League)	0	20	1
Rapid Vienna	Total		30	1	5	1	—		15	0	50	2
Slovan Bratislava	2023–24	Slovak First Football League	26	0	3	0	—		11 (Note: Two appearances in UEFA Champions League, two appearances in UEFA Europa League and seven appearances in UEFA Europa Conference League)	1	40	1
Slovan Bratislava	2024–25	Slovak First Football League	17	0	5	0	—		13	1	35	1
Slovan Bratislava	2025–26	Slovak First Football League	14	0	1	0	—		8 (Note: Two appearances in UEFA Champions League, one appearance in UEFA Europa League, five appearances in UEFA Conference League)	0	23	0
Slovan Bratislava	2026–27	Slovak First Football League	10	0	2	0	—		4	0	16	0
Slovan Bratislava	Total		67	0	11	0	—		36	2	114	2
Career total			296	7	35	2	4	0	58	2	393	11

=== International ===
Appearances and goals by national team and year
National team	Year	Apps	Goals
Austria	2013	1	0
Austria	2014	0	0
Austria	2015	1	0
Austria	2016	6	0
Austria	2017	0	0
Austria	2018	1	0
Total		9	0
