= Utku Şen =

German footballer

Personal information
- Date of birth: 15 June 1998 (age 28)
- Place of birth: Flensburg, Germany
- Height: 1.78 m (5 ft 10 in)
- Position: Forward

Team information
- Current team: Ankaraspor
- Number: 9

Youth career
- TSB Flensburg
- –2014: Holstein Kiel
- 2014–2015: Hannover 96
- 2015–2017: Holstein Kiel

Senior career*
Years	Team	Apps	(Gls)
2017–2019	Holstein Kiel	1	(0)
2017	Holstein Kiel II	7	(3)
2018	→ VfL Osnabrück (loan)	9	(0)
2018–2019	→ Lüneburger SK Hansa (loan)	24	(10)
2019–2021	Adanaspor	17	(1)
2020–2021	→ Vanspor (loan)	34	(9)
2021–2022	Diyarbekirspor	16	(6)
2022–2024	1461 Trabzon FK	35	(7)
2023	→ Vanspor (loan)	13	(7)
2024	Ankaraspor	16	(6)
2024–2025	Adana 01 FK	9	(1)
2025	→ Osmaniyespor FK (loan)	12	(9)
2025–	Ankaraspor	1	(0)
- * Club domestic league appearances and goals as of 30 August 2025

Utku Şen (born 15 June 1998) is a German footballer who plays as a forward for Turkish TFF 2. Lig club Ankaraspor.

== Personal life ==
Şen was born in Germany, and is of Turkish descent through his parents.
