= Mike-Steven Bähre =

German footballer (born 1995)

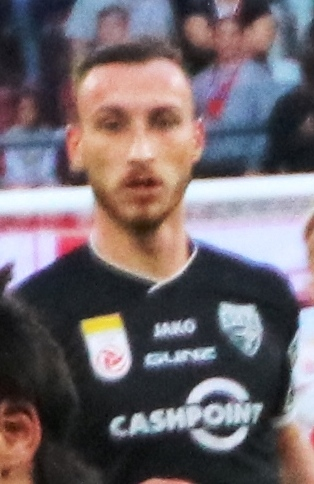
- Bähre in 2023

Personal information
- Full name: Mike-Steven Bähre
- Date of birth: 10 August 1995 (age 31)
- Place of birth: Garbsen, Germany
- Height: 1.79 m (5 ft 10 in)
- Position: Attacking midfielder

Team information
- Current team: Rheindorf Altach
- Number: 8

Youth career
- –2015: Hannover 96

Senior career*
Years	Team	Apps	(Gls)
2014–2019	Hannover 96 II	47	(10)
2015–2019	Hannover 96	3	(0)
2016	→ Hallescher FC (loan)	6	(0)
2018	→ SV Meppen (loan)	16	(1)
2018–2019	→ Barnsley (loan)	35	(1)
2019–2021	Barnsley	26	(1)
2021	SV Meppen	9	(0)
2022	SV Meppen	11	(0)
2023–	Rheindorf Altach	102	(7)
- * Club domestic league appearances and goals as of 14:26, 17 September 2026 (UTC)

Mike-Steven Bähre (born 10 August 1995) is a German professional footballer who plays as an attacking midfielder for Austrian Bundesliga club Rheindorf Altach.

== Club career ==
Bähre made his Bundesliga debut for Hannover 96 on 12 December 2015 against TSG 1899 Hoffenheim replacing Allan Saint-Maximin after 77 minutes in a 1–0 away defeat.

In January 2016, he was loaned out to Hallescher FC for the rest of the 2015–16 season. In August 2017, he joined SV Meppen on a season-long loan deal. On 31 August 2018, he moved to Barnsley on a season-long loan deal. His move to Barnsley was made permanent in May 2019. On 22 January 2021, Bähre left Barnsley via mutual consent.

On 9 December 2022, Bähre signed with Austrian Bundesliga club Rheindorf Altach.

== Career statistics ==
As of match played 3 November 2024

Appearances and goals by club, season and competition
Club	Season	League			National cup (Note: Includes FA Cup, Austrian Cup)		League cup (Note: Includes EFL Cup)		Other		Total	
Club	Season	Division	Apps	Goals	Apps	Goals	Apps	Goals	Apps	Goals	Apps	Goals
Hannover 96 II	2013–14	Regionalliga Nord	1	0	—		—		—		1	0
Hannover 96 II	2014–15	Regionalliga Nord	28	7	—		—		—		28	7
Hannover 96 II	2015–16	Regionalliga Nord	3	0	—		—		—		3	0
Hannover 96 II	2016–17	Regionalliga Nord	2	0	—		—		—		2	0
Hannover 96 II	2017–18	Regionalliga Nord	10	3	—		—		—		10	3
Hannover 96 II	2018–19	Regionalliga Nord	3	0	—		—		—		3	0
Hannover 96 II	Total		47	10	—		—		—		47	10
Hannover 96	2015–16	Bundesliga	1	0	0	0	—		0	0	1	0
Hannover 96	2016–17	2. Bundesliga	2	0	0	0	—		0	0	2	0
Hannover 96	2017–18	Bundesliga	0	0	0	0	—		0	0	0	0
Hannover 96	2018–19	Bundesliga	0	0	0	0	—		0	0	0	0
Hannover 96	Total		3	0	0	0	—		0	0	3	0
Hallescher FC (loan)	2015–16	3. Liga	6	0	0	0	—		0	0	6	0
SV Meppen (loan)	2017–18	3. Liga	16	1	0	0	—		0	0	16	1
Barnsley (loan)	2018–19	EFL League One	35	1	3	1	0	0	4 (Note: Appearances in EFL Trophy)	0	42	2
Barnsley	2019–20	EFL Championship	26	1	0	0	1	0	—		27	1
Barnsley	Total		61	2	3	1	1	0	4	0	68	3
SV Meppen	2020–21	3. Liga	9	0	—		—		—		9	0
SV Meppen	2021–22	3. Liga	11	0	0	0	—		1 (Note: Appearance in Lower Saxony Cup)	0	12	0
SV Meppen	Total		20	0	0	0	—		1	0	21	0
Rheindorf Altach	2022–23	Austrian Bundesliga	7	1	—		—		—		7	1
Rheindorf Altach	2023–24	Austrian Bundesliga	30	5	4	0	—		—		34	5
Rheindorf Altach	2024–25	Austrian Bundesliga	11	0	1	0	—		—		12	0
Rheindorf Altach	Total		48	6	5	0	—		—		53	6
Career total			201	19	8	1	1	0	5	0	215	20

== Honours ==
Barnsley

- EFL League One runner-up: 2018–19
