= Uffe Bech =

Danish footballer (born 1993)

Personal information
- Full name: Uffe Manich Bech
- Date of birth: 13 January 1993 (age 33)
- Place of birth: Copenhagen, Denmark
- Height: 1.70 m (5 ft 7 in)
- Position: Winger

Youth career
- Hellerup
- 2006–2010: Lyngby

Senior career*
Years	Team	Apps	(Gls)
2010–2013	Lyngby	41	(7)
2013–2015	Nordsjælland	43	(14)
2015–2019	Hannover 96 II	10	(5)
2015–2019	Hannover 96	18	(2)
2018	→ Greuther Fürth (loan)	2	(0)
2018	→ Brøndby (loan)	8	(2)
2019–2022	Panathinaikos	14	(1)
Total		136	(31)

International career
2008–2009	Denmark U16	7	(3)
2009–2010	Denmark U17	10	(6)
2010	Denmark U18	4	(1)
2010–2012	Denmark U19	12	(3)
2012	Denmark U20	3	(1)
2012–2015	Denmark U21	9	(2)
2014	Denmark	3	(0)
- * Club domestic league appearances and goals

Uffe Manich Bech (Danish pronunciation: [ˈufə ˈmæne̝k ˈpek]; born 13 January 1993) is a Danish former professional footballer who played as a winger.

== Youth career ==
Bech's career started in Hellerup IK, where he at the age of 13 switched to Lyngby Boldklub. Throughout his young career he got plenty of playing time in the various Danish youth national team, where he on several occasions has been the top scorer. Already at the age of 15, Bech signed a three-year contract with Lyngby. He was a big talent and went on trials at among others Blackburn Rovers and Heerenveen in 2009. Bech signed a new three-year contract with Lyngby in August 2010.

== Club career ==
=== Lyngby ===
Bech got his official debut in the Danish Superliga on 1 August 2010 in a game against Silkeborg, where Bach played the last five minutes, coming on from the bench.

On 13 February 2011, it was published by Lyngby Boldklub that they would send him to Hamburger SV, where he would be allowed to train with the club until the following Friday. Lyngby's first-team coach Niels Frederiksen struck, however, that Uffe just went to Germany to try a big club. Bech got slowly more and more space in the squad. Especially after a game against Midtjylland in April 2011, where Bech replaced David Boysen with 20 minutes of the game left, and a few minutes later scored to the final result 1–0. Bech won the "U19 talent of the year in Denmark" in 2011, given by DBU.

Bech was officially promoted to the first team squad in the summer 2012. Already six months later, he extended his contract until 2014. The talented offensive player impressed everybody in his last season. After a fantastic half season in the 2012–13 season, with 17 league games and 5 goals, Bech got spotted by many clubs. Bech played in Lyngby BK until January 2013 when he was picked for the Superliga club Nordsjælland.

=== Nordsjælland ===
On 22 January 2013, Bech transferred to Nordsjælland on a 3 1/2-year contract. After his arrival, he played five games in the first half season, before getting injured indefinitely. The injuries continued for the young player and he was operated in his meniscus in August 2013. However, he managed to get back in training only a month later and made his comeback in October. But a week after his comeback, he got injured again. It was once again in his knee. Bech had a bad start at his new club, as he played 11 games and scores two goals in the 2013–14 season.

But despite all these injuries, German club Mainz 05 was ready to sign Bech in the summer 2014, however, their bid was too low for FCN and they rejected the club. Bech did very well in the 2013–14 season. He played 27 league matches and scored 10 goals. According to Danish medias, Midtjylland tried to sign Bech in February 2015. At the end of the season, Bech again bowed with knee problems. Bech revealed, that it was time for a change and he wanted to take a step up with some new challenges.

=== Hannover ===
On 8 July 2015, Bech signed a four-year contract with the Bundesliga club Hannover 96. On 28 November 2015, he scored his first Bundesliga goal in his side's 4–0 home win against newly promoted side FC Ingolstadt.

Bech's first season in Hannover was marked by injuries and in April 2016 he torn a tendon in his knee, ruling him out for "a longer period of time". He ended up being out until December 2016. The 2016–17 season was a season riddled with injuries for Bech, and he did see not much playing time. He only played seven games in this season.

On 31 January 2018, Bech moved to second tier Greuther Fürth on loan until the end of the 2017–18 season.

On 31 August, Bech joined Danish Superliga team Brøndby on a loan until 31 December 2018 with the option of a permanent transfer at the end of the first season half. After suffering an injury in the first minutes of a league match against Copenhagen and subsequently not playing for more than a month, Brøndby decided not to trigger the purchase option, and Bech returned to Hannover 96.

=== Panathinaikos ===
On 13 August 2019, Bech signed a three-year contract with the Greek Greek Super League club Panathinaikos. During an injury-plagued tenure, Bech managed to score just one goal in 16 appearances before departing the club upon the expiration of his contract in 2022.

=== Retirement ===
In April 2024, Bech announced his retirement, citing ongoing injury issues. He stated, "It has been an injury hell that I have not been able to get out of, even though I have fought really hard for it. My head and heart want to play football as much as ever, but my knee says stop." The previous year, he attempted a comeback, which ultimately was unsuccessful.

== International career ==
Bech has played for both the U-16, U-17, U-18, U-19, U-20 and U-21 Danish national team, where he during his time was top scorer for the first three. In 2011, he got the U-19 Danish national team talent prize.

Bech had his debut for the Denmark national team on 11 October 2014 in a UEFA Euro 2016 qualification game against Albania.

== Career statistics ==
=== Club ===
As of 13 March 2026

Appearances and goals by club, season and competition
Club	Season	League			National cup (Note: Includes Danish Cup, DFB-Pokal, Greek Cup)		Continental		Other		Total	
Club	Season	Division	Apps	Goals	Apps	Goals	Apps	Goals	Apps	Goals	Apps	Goals
Lyngby	2010–11	Danish Superliga	12	1	2	0	—		—		14	1
Lyngby	2011–12	Danish Superliga	10	0	0	0	—		—		10	0
Lyngby	2012–13	Danish 1st Division	16	5	1	0	—		—		17	5
Lyngby	Total		38	6	3	0	—		—		41	3
Nordsjælland	2012–13	Danish Superliga	5	2	—		—		—		5	2
Nordsjælland	2013–14	Danish Superliga	11	2	1	0	—		—		12	2
Nordsjælland	2014–15	Danish Superliga	27	10	0	0	—		—		27	10
Nordsjælland	Total		43	14	1	0	—		—		44	14
Hannover 96 II	2015–16	Regionalliga Nord	5	0	—		—		—		5	0
Hannover 96 II	2018–19	Regionalliga Nord	7	1	—		—		—		7	1
Hannover 96 II	Total		12	1	—		—		—		12	1
Hannover 96	2015–16	Bundesliga	11	1	1	0	—		—		12	1
Hannover 96	2016–17	2. Bundesliga	7	1	0	0	—		—		7	1
Hannover 96	2018–19	Bundesliga	2	0	0	0	—		—		2	0
Hannover 96	Total		20	2	1	0	—		—		21	2
Greuther Fürth (loan)	2017–18	2. Bundesliga	2	0	—		—		—		2	0
Brøndby (loan)	2018–19	Danish Superliga	8	2	0	0	—		—		8	2
Panathinaikos	2019–20	Super League Greece	10	0	2	0	—		4 (Note: Appearances in Super League Greece Playoffs)	1	16	1
Career total			133	25	7	0	0	0	4	1	144	26
