= Hendrik Weydandt =

German footballer

Personal information
- Full name: Hendrik Weydandt
- Date of birth: 16 July 1995 (age 31)
- Place of birth: Gehrden, Germany
- Height: 1.95 m (6 ft 5 in)
- Position: Striker

Youth career
- –2013: TSV Groß Munzel

Senior career*
Years	Team	Apps	(Gls)
2013–2014	TSV Groß Munzel		
2014–2018	Germania Egestorf	97	(41)
2018–2021	Hannover 96 II	3	(1)
2018–2023	Hannover 96	138	(24)
Total		238	(66)
- * Club domestic league appearances and goals

Hendrik Weydandt (born 16 July 1995) is a German former professional footballer who played as a striker.

== Career ==
Weydandt made his professional debut for Hannover 96 on 19 August 2018, appearing in the first round of the 2018–19 DFB-Pokal against 3. Liga side Karlsruher SC. He was substituted on in the 82nd minute for Niclas Füllkrug, and scored the final two goals in the 85th and 90th minutes in the 6–0 away win. On 25 August, he scored on his Bundesliga debut in a 1–1 draw to Werder Bremen after coming on as a substitute.

On 3 May 2023, Weydandt announced that he would end his professional career after the 2022–23 season to work as a tax advisor in his father's office.

== Career statistics ==
Appearances and goals by club, season and competition
Club	Season	League			National Cup		Other		Total	
Club	Season	Division	Apps	Goals	Apps	Goals	Apps	Goals	Apps	Goals
Germania Egestorf	2014–15	Oberliga Niedersachsen	16	2	—		—		16	2
Germania Egestorf	2015–16	Oberliga Niedersachsen	25	13	—		2 (Note: Appearances in the Regionalliga playoff)	2	27	15
Germania Egestorf	2016–17	Regionalliga Nord	25	12	—		—		25	12
Germania Egestorf	2017–18	Regionalliga Nord	31	14	—		—		31	14
Germania Egestorf	Total		97	41	—		2	2	99	43
Hannover 96 II	2018–19	Regionalliga Nord	2	1	—		—		2	1
Hannover 96 II	2021–22	Regionalliga Nord	1	0	—		—		1	0
Hannover 96 II	Total		3	1	—		—		3	1
Hannover 96	2018–19	Bundesliga	28	6	2	2	—		30	8
Hannover 96	2019–20	2. Bundesliga	27	9	1	0	—		28	9
Hannover 96	2020–21	2. Bundesliga	30	4	2	1	—		32	5
Hannover 96	2021–22	2. Bundesliga	30	3	4	0	—		34	3
Hannover 96	2022–23	2. Bundesliga	23	2	1	0	—		24	2
Hannover 96	Total		138	24	10	3	0	0	148	27
Career Total			238	66	10	3	2	2	250	71
