= 2017–18 Eintracht Braunschweig season =

Eintracht Braunschweig
2017–18 season
- Chairman: Sebastian Ebel
- Manager: Torsten Lieberknecht
- Stadium: Eintracht-Stadion, Braunschweig, Lower Saxony
- 2. Bundesliga: 17th (relegated)
- DFB-Pokal: First round
- Top goalscorer: League: Suleiman Abdullahi (7); All: Suleiman Abdullahi (7)
- Highest home attendance: 20,300
- Lowest home attendance: 18,550
- Average home league attendance: 19,578
Home colours	Away colours

The 2017–18 Eintracht Braunschweig season was the 124th season in the club's football history. In 2017–18 the club competed the 2. Bundesliga, the second tier of German football.

== Review and events ==
The 2017–18 season of Eintracht Braunschweig began on 26 June 2017 with their first training session.

The draw for the first round of the 2017–18 DFB-Pokal happened on 11 June and paired Braunschweig with fellow 2. Bundesliga team Holstein Kiel.

On 7 July 2017, the team headed for a ten-day-long pre-season training camp in Herxheim bei Landau/Pfalz, Rhineland-Palatinate.

On 25 July 2017, Ken Reichel was named captain of the team.

On 4 August 2017, the club announced that Daniel Ischdonat would temporarily replace the injured Alexander Kunze as goalkeeping coach.

== Matches and results ==
=== Legend ===
Win Tie Loss

=== Friendly matches ===
30 June 2017	Braunschweiger SC Acosta	0–10	Eintracht Braunschweig	Braunschweig
18:30		Report	Dacaj 14'; Kumbela 39'; Hernández 41' (pen.); Stettin 51'; Biada 58', 70'; Breitkreuz 67'; Baffo 75', 80'; Khelifi 87'	Stadium: Konrad-Koch-Stadion; Attendance: 1,500

2 July 2017	FT Braunschweig	0–11	Eintracht Braunschweig	Braunschweig
17:00		Report	Breitkreuz 9'; Biada 23', 26'; Dacaj 42'; Zuck 55'; Kumbela 58', 75', 88'; Moll 65'; Boland 80'; Canbaz 90'	Stadium: Prinzenparkstadion; Attendance: 700

5 July 2017	Eintracht Braunschweig	6–1	1. FC Magdeburg	Schöningen
18:30	Hochscheidt 37'; Zuck 48', 85'; Dacaj 75', 79'; Breitkreuz 83'	Report	Niemeyer 7'	Stadium: Elmstadion; Attendance: 4,000

8 July 2017	SV Viktoria Herxheim	0–2	Eintracht Braunschweig	Herxheim bei Landau/Pfalz
18:00		Report	Biada 11'; Khelifi 87'	Stadium: Stadion "Am Krönungsbusch"

11 July 2017	SV Waldhof Mannheim	1–1	Eintracht Braunschweig	Mannheim
18:30	R. Korte 85'	Report; Report	Kumbela 87'	Stadium: Carl-Benz-Stadion; Attendance: 1,270

15 July 2017	Karlsruher SC	2–1	Eintracht Braunschweig	Karlsruhe
17:00	Stroh-Engel 47'; Baffo 53' (o.g.)	Report	Zuck 4'	Stadium: Wildparkstadion; Attendance: 1,147

23 July 2017	Eintracht Braunschweig	2–2	1. FC Köln	Braunschweig
15:30	Zuck 60'; Kumbela 70'	Report	Rudņevs 28' (pen.), 30'	Stadium: Eintracht-Stadion; Attendance: 7,900

1 August 2017	Eintracht Braunschweig	2–3	(Italy) Fiorentina	Salzgitter
18:30	Hernández 26', 67'	Report	Chiesa 10', 12'; Milenković 76'	Stadium: Stadion am Salzgittersee; Attendance: 1,932

1 September 2017	Eintracht Braunschweig	0–3	SV Wehen Wiesbaden	Braunschweig
11:30		Report	Diawusie 7', 10', 20'	Stadium: Eintracht-Stadion, B-Platz

=== 2. Bundesliga ===
==== League table ====
Pos	Team	Pld	W	D	L	GF	GA	GD	Pts	Promotion, qualification or relegation
14	Dynamo Dresden	34	11	8	15	42	52	−10	41	
15	Greuther Fürth	34	10	10	14	37	48	−11	40	
16	Erzgebirge Aue (O)	34	10	10	14	35	49	−14	40	Qualification for relegation play-offs
17	Eintracht Braunschweig (R)	34	8	15	11	37	43	−6	39	Relegation to 3. Liga
18	1. FC Kaiserslautern (R)	34	9	8	17	42	55	−13	35	Relegation to 3. Liga

Source: DFB
Rules for classification: 1) Points; 2) Goal difference; 3) Goals scored
(O) Play-off winners; (R) Relegated

==== Results summary ====
Overall								Home						Away					
Pld	W	D	L	GF	GA	GD	Pts	W	D	L	GF	GA	GD	W	D	L	GF	GA	GD
34	8	15	11	37	43	−6	39	6	6	5	20	18	+2	2	9	6	17	25	−8

Source: kicker.de

==== Results by round ====
Round	1	2	3	4	5	6	7	8	9	10	11	12	13	14	15	16	17	18	19	20	21	22	23	24	25	26	27	28	29	30	31	32	33	34
Ground	A	H	H	A	H	A	H	A	H	A	H	A	H	A	H	A	H	H	A	A	H	A	H	A	H	A	H	A	H	A	H	A	H	A
Result	D	W	D	D	D	D	W	L	L	D	W	D	D	D	L	W	D	L	L	W	L	D	W	L	W	D	W	L	D	D	D	L	L	L
Position	8	4	7	9	9	10	10	12	12	12	9	11	13	13	13	9	15	15	15	14	15	15	15	16	16	17	17	17	17	17	17	17	17	17

Source: kicker.de
A = Away; H = Home; W = Win; D = Draw; L = Loss

==== Matches ====
31 July 2017 1	Fortuna Düsseldorf	2–2	Eintracht Braunschweig	Düsseldorf
20:30 CEST	Sobottka 9'; Nielsen (yellow card) 63'; Neuhaus 79'; Gießelmann (yellow card) 90'	Report	Baffo 35'; Nyman 60'; Moll (red card) 81'; Hochscheidt (yellow card) 85'; Zuck (yellow card) 88'	Stadium: Esprit Arena; Attendance: 25,492; Referee: Christian Dingert

5 August 2017 2	Eintracht Braunschweig	2–0	1. FC Heidenheim	Braunschweig
15:30 CEST	Wittek 28' (o.g.); Boland 80'	Report	Strauß (yellow card) 18'; Griesbeck (yellow card) 82'	Stadium: Eintracht-Stadion; Attendance: 18,550; Referee: Daniel Siebert

18 August 2017 3	Eintracht Braunschweig	1–1	FC Erzgebirge Aue	Braunschweig
18:30 CEST	Khelifi 26'; Nyman (yellow card) 35'; Zuck (yellow card) 50'	Report	Nazarov 24'; Tiffert (yellow card) 37'; Kalig (yellow card) 43'; Riese (yellow card) 70'; Rizzuto (yellow card) 83'	Stadium: Eintracht-Stadion; Attendance: 20,300; Referee: René Rohde

28 August 2017 4	1. FC Kaiserslautern	1–1	Eintracht Braunschweig	Kaiserslautern
20:30 CEST	Kessel (yellow card) 11'; Albæk (yellow card) 35'; Reichel 80' (o.g.); Correia (yellow card) 90+2'	Report	Hernández 27'; Samson (yellow card) 56'; Zuck (yellow card) 71'; Reichel (yellow card) 84'; Fejzić (yellow card) 85'	Stadium: Fritz-Walter-Stadion; Attendance: 20,100; Referee: Robert Kampka

10 September 2017 5	Eintracht Braunschweig	1–1	SV Sandhausen	Braunschweig
13:30 CEST	Samson (yellow card) 8'; Boland 48'; Kumbela (yellow card) 89'	Report	Roßbach (yellow card) 74'; Klingmann 83'	Stadium: Eintracht-Stadion; Attendance: 19,885; Referee: Sven Jablonski

15 September 2017 6	Union Berlin	1–1	Eintracht Braunschweig	Berlin
19:00 CEST	Gogia (yellow card) 19'; Hedlund 52' (yellow card) 82'	Report	Hernández (yellow card) 32'; Nyman 62'; Valsvik (yellow card) 89'	Stadium: Stadion An der Alten Försterei; Attendance: 21,114; Referee: Sören Storks

20 September 2017 7	Eintracht Braunschweig	3–0	Greuther Fürth	Braunschweig
18:30 CEST	Nyman 23'; Baffo 28'; Boland (yellow card) 32'; Kumbela 79'	Report	Wittek (yellow card) 90+1'	Stadium: Eintracht-Stadion; Attendance: 18,785; Referee: Matthias Jöllenbeck

23 September 2017 8	Jahn Regensburg	2–1	Eintracht Braunschweig	Regensburg
13:00 CEST	Saller (yellow card) 41'; Adamyan (yellow card) 43'; Geipl (yellow card) 45'; Grüttner 47'; Stolze (yellow card) 62'; Nietfeld 77'	Report	Khelifi (red card) 26'; Baffo 42' (yellow card) 83'; Sauer (red card) 64'; Boland (yellow card) 67' (yellow-red card); Reichel (yellow card) 90+3'	Stadium: Continental Arena; Attendance: 8,432; Referee: Tobias Reichel

1 October 2017 9	Eintracht Braunschweig	0–2	FC St Pauli	Braunschweig
13:30 CEST	Hernández (penalty missed) 12'	Report	Buchtmann 76'; Şahin 80'	Stadium: Eintracht-Stadion; Attendance: 22,695; Referee: Manuel Gräfe

13 October 2017 10	MSV Duisburg	0–0	Eintracht Braunschweig	Duisburg
18:30	Schnellhardt (yellow card) 69'; Hajri (yellow card) 73'	Report	Becker (yellow card) 85'	Stadium: Schauinsland-Reisen-Arena; Attendance: 13,855; Referee: Lasse Koslowski

21 October 2017 11	Eintracht Braunschweig	1–0	Bochum	Braunschweig
13:00	Yıldırım 7'	Report	Gündüz (yellow card) 48'; Bastians (yellow card) 72'; Celozzi (yellow card) 77'	Stadium: Eintracht-Stadion; Attendance: 19,790; Referee: Martin Thomsen

29 October 2017 12	Dynamo Dresden	1–1	Eintracht Braunschweig	Dresden
16:00	Möschl 12'; Jannik Müller (yellow card) 30'	Report	Valsvik (yellow card) 11' (goal) 60'; Sauer (yellow card) 48'; Reichel (yellow card) 86'; Samson (yellow card) 90+2'	Stadium: DDV-Stadion; Attendance: 29,312; Referee: Matthias Jöllenbeck

4 November 2017 13	Eintracht Braunschweig	2–2	Darmstadt 98	Braunschweig
13:00	Sulu 8' (o.g.); Biada (yellow card) 27'; Yıldırım (yellow card) 88'; Schönfeld 90+2'	Report	Marvin Mehlem 30'; Kamavuaka 52'; Sobiech (yellow card) 57'; Stark (yellow card) 69'	Stadium: Eintracht-Stadion; Attendance: 20,190; Referee: Patrick Alt

17 November 2017 14	Arminia Bielefeld	2–2	Eintracht Braunschweig	Bielefeld
18:30	Schütz 7'; Prietl (yellow card) 26'; Voglsammer (yellow card) 74'; Putaro 90'	Report	Khelifi (yellow card) 33'; Breitkreuz (yellow card) 52'; Abdullahi 56'; Hochscheidt 64'	Stadium: SchücoArena; Attendance: 16,367; Referee: Sven Waschitzki

25 November 2017 15	Eintracht Braunschweig	2–3	1. FC Nürnberg	Braunschweig
13:00	Reichel (yellow card) 16'; Khelifi 38'; Hochscheidt (yellow card) 54'; Abdullahi 64'	Report	Behrens 36'; Kammerbauer (yellow card) 61'; Ishak (yellow card) 63' (goal) 68' 83'; Margreitter (yellow card) 79'; Valentini (yellow card) 86'; Sepsi (yellow card) 89'	Stadium: Eintracht-Stadion; Attendance: 21,605; Referee: Sören Storks

4 December 2017 16	FC Ingolstadt 04	0–2	Eintracht Braunschweig	Ingolstadt
20:30	Cohen (yellow card) 54'; Träsch (yellow card) 83'	Report	Breitkreuz (yellow card) 10'; Reichel (yellow card) 26'; Zuck (yellow card) 32' (goal) 76'; Fejzić (yellow card) 52'; Abdullahi 65'	Stadium: Audi Sportpark; Attendance: 8,714; Referee: Robert Kampka

8 December 2017 17	Eintracht Braunschweig	0–0	Holstein Kiel	Braunschweig
18:30 CET	Fejzić (yellow card) 65'	Report	Schmidt (yellow card) 62'; Drexler (yellow card) 86'; Czichos (yellow card) 87'	Stadium: Eintracht-Stadion; Attendance: 21,075; Referee: Benedikt Kempkes

15 December 2017 18	Eintracht Braunschweig	0–1	Fortuna Düsseldorf	Braunschweig
18:30 CET	Reichel (yellow card) 58'; Yıldırım (yellow card) 74'	Report	Lovern 9' (yellow card) 9'; Hoffmann (yellow card) 48'; Raman (yellow card) 74'; Ayhan (yellow card) 90+4'	Stadium: Eintracht-Stadion; Attendance: 19,725; Referee: Patrick Alt

24 January 2018 19	1. FC Heidenheim	2–0	Eintracht Braunschweig	Heidenheim an der Brenz
20:30 CET	Wittek (yellow card) 25'; Thomalla 48'; Pusch (yellow card) 51' (goal) 83'	Report	Teigl (yellow card) 37'; Valsvik (yellow card) 68'; Reichel (yellow card) 76'; Fejzić (yellow card) 83'; Zuck (yellow card) 90+1'	Stadium: Voith-Arena; Attendance: 10,500; Referee: Daniel Schlager

28 January 2018 20	Erzgebirge Aue	1–3	Eintracht Braunschweig	Aue
13:30 CET	Köpke 12'; Strauß (yellow card) 58'; Wydra (yellow card) 81'; Rapp (yellow card) 90'	Report	Abdullahi 13', 71' (yellow card) 73'; Kumbela 35'; Schönfeld (yellow card) 67'; Hofmann (yellow card) 69'	Stadium: Erzgebirgsstadion; Attendance: 8,500; Referee: Christof Günsch

4 February 2018 21	Eintracht Braunschweig	1–2	1. FC Kaiserslautern	Braunschweig
13:30 CET	Nkansah (yellow card) 32'; Teigl (yellow card) 34'; Abdullahi 72'	Report	Spalvis 4' 35'; Seufert (yellow card) 37'; Jenssen (yellow card) 42'	Stadium: Eintracht-Stadion; Attendance: 20,550; Referee: Patrick Alt

11 February 2018 22	Sandhausen	0–0	Eintracht Braunschweig	Sandhausen
13:30 CET	Derstroff (yellow card) 43'	Report	Breitkreuz (yellow card) 17'; Hochscheidt (yellow card) 42'; Teigl (yellow card) 51'; Bulut (yellow card) 84'	Stadium: BWT-Stadion am Hardtwald; Attendance: 4,381; Referee: Christian Dingert

18 February 2018 23	Eintracht Braunschweig	1–0	Union Berlin	Braunschweig
13:30 CET	Reichel 16'	Report	Parensen (yellow card) 60'; Gogia (yellow card) 90'	Stadium: Eintracht-Stadion; Attendance: 21,150; Referee: Benedikt Kempkes

24 February 2018 24	Greuther Fürth	2–1	Eintracht Braunschweig	Fürth
13:00 CET	Narey 21'; Ernst 79'; Gugganig (yellow card) 83'; Green (yellow card) 86'	Report	Bulut (yellow card) 37'; Kumbela 45'; Zuck (yellow card) 45+2'; Hochscheidt (yellow card) 86'	Stadium: Sportpark Ronhof Thomas Sommer; Attendance: 7,845; Referee: Matthias Jöllenbeck

25	Eintracht Braunschweig	v	Jahn Regensburg	Braunschweig
				Stadium: Eintracht-Stadion

26	FC St Pauli	v	Eintracht Braunschweig	St. Pauli
				Stadium: Millerntor-Stadion

27	Eintracht Braunschweig	v	MSV Duisburg	Braunschweig
				Stadium: Eintracht-Stadion

28	Bochum	v	Eintracht Braunschweig	Bochum
				Stadium: Vonovia Ruhrstadion

29	Eintracht Braunschweig	v	Dynamo Dresden	Braunschweig
				Stadium: Eintracht-Stadion

30	Darmstadt 98	v	Eintracht Braunschweig	Darmstadt
				Stadium: Merck-Stadion am Böllenfalltor

31	Eintracht Braunschweig	v	Arminia Bielefeld	Braunschweig
				Stadium: Eintracht-Stadion

32	1. FC Nürnberg	v	Eintracht Braunschweig	Nuremberg
				Stadium: Max-Morlock-Stadion

33	Eintracht Braunschweig	v	FC Ingolstadt 04	Braunschweig
				Stadium: Eintracht-Stadion

34	Holstein Kiel	v	Eintracht Braunschweig	Kiel
				Stadium: Holstein-Stadion

=== DFB-Pokal ===
11 August 2017 First round	Holstein Kiel	2–1	Eintracht Braunschweig	Kiel
20:45	Drexler 71' (pen.); Ducksch 77'	Report	Nyman 48'; Baffo (red card) 70'	Stadium: Holstein-Stadion; Attendance: 10,052; Referee: Guido Winkmann (Kerken)

== Squad ==
=== Current squad ===
As of 3 January 2018

Note: Flags indicate national team as defined under FIFA eligibility rules; some limited exceptions apply. Players may hold more than one non-FIFA nationality.

No.	Pos.	Nation	Player
1	GK	GER	Marcel Engelhardt
2	DF	GER	Steve Breitkreuz
3	DF	DEN	Frederik Tingager
4	DF	SWE	Joseph Baffo
5	DF	NOR	Gustav Valsvik
6	MF	GER	Quirin Moll
7	MF	GER	Özkan Yıldırım
9	FW	GER	Julius Biada
10	MF	GER	Mirko Boland
11	MF	GER	Jan Hochscheidt
12	FW	COD	Domi Kumbela
13	MF	GER	Louis Samson
14	DF	GER	Robin Becker
15	FW	SWE	Christoffer Nyman

No.	Pos.	Nation	Player
16	GK	BIH	Jasmin Fejzić
17	DF	GER	Steffen Nkansah
18	DF	AUT	Georg Teigl (on loan from FC Augsburg)
19	DF	GER	Ken Reichel (captain)
20	FW	NGR	Suleiman Abdullahi
21	MF	GER	Patrick Schönfeld
22	MF	SUI	Salim Khelifi
23	MF	GER	Onel Hernández
24	DF	GER	Maximilian Sauer
27	DF	GER	Niko Kijewski
30	MF	GER	Hendrick Zuck
33	GK	NED	Eric Verstappen
34	FW	GER	Phillip Tietz
37	MF	GER	Eros Dacaj

=== Transfers ===
==== Summer ====
In:

No.	Pos.	Nation	Player
2	DF	GER	Steve Breitkreuz (from FC Erzgebirge Aue)
7	MF	GER	Özkan Yıldırım (from Fortuna Düsseldorf)
13	MF	GER	Louis Samson (from FC Erzgebirge Aue)
14	DF	GER	Robin Becker (from Bayer 04 Leverkusen, previously on loan at 1. FC Heidenheim)
17	DF	GER	Steffen Nkansah (from Borussia Mönchengladbach II)
33	GK	NED	Eric Verstappen (from De Graafschap)
37	MF	GER	Eros Dacaj (from Eintracht Braunschweig II)

Out:

No.	Pos.	Nation	Player
3	DF	SUI	Saulo Decarli (to Club Brugge)
8	MF	POL	Adam Matuszczyk (to Zagłębie Lubin)
12	MF	SLO	Nik Omladič (to SpVgg Greuther Fürth)
17	DF	GHA	Phil Ofosu-Ayeh (to Wolverhampton Wanderers F.C.)
25	DF	POR	Marcel Correia (to 1. FC Kaiserslautern)
26	DF	GER	Michael Schulze (to Sportfreunde Lotte)
--	FW	DEN	Mads Dittmer Hvilsom (to Esbjerg fB, previously on loan)

=== Player statistics ===
As of 14 September 2017

No.	Pos	Player	2. Bundesliga		DFB-Pokal		Total	
No.	Pos	Player	Apps	Goals	Apps	Goals	Apps	Goals
1	GK	(Germany) Marcel Engelhardt	0	0	0	0	0	0
2	DF	(Germany) Steve Breitkreuz	2	0	1	0	3	0
4	DF	(Sweden) Joseph Baffo	5	1	1	0	6	1
5	DF	(Norway) Gustav Valsvik	5	0	1	0	6	0
6	MF	(Germany) Quirin Moll	1	0	1	0	2	0
7	MF	(Germany) Özkan Yıldırım	1	0	0	0	1	0
9	FW	(Germany) Julius Biada	2	0	0	0	2	0
10	MF	(Germany) Mirko Boland	5	2	1	0	6	2
11	MF	(Germany) Jan Hochscheidt	4	0	1	0	5	0
12	FW	(Democratic Republic of the Congo) Domi Kumbela	2	0	0	0	2	0
13	MF	(Germany) Louis Samson	4	0	1	0	5	0
14	DF	(Germany) Robin Becker	3	0	0	0	3	0
15	FW	(Sweden) Christoffer Nyman	4	1	1	1	5	2
16	GK	(Bosnia and Herzegovina) Jasmin Fejzić	5	0	1	0	6	0
17	DF	(Germany) Steffen Nkansah	1	0	0	0	1	0
19	DF	(Germany) Ken Reichel	5	0	1	0	6	0
20	FW	(Nigeria) Suleiman Abdullahi	4	0	1	0	5	0
21	MF	(Germany) Patrick Schönfeld	0	0	0	0	0	0
22	MF	(Switzerland) Salim Khelifi	5	1	0	0	5	1
23	MF	(Germany) Onel Hernández	5	1	1	0	6	1
24	DF	(Germany) Maximilian Sauer	1	0	1	0	2	0
27	DF	(Germany) Niko Kijewski	0	0	0	0	0	0
30	MF	(Germany) Hendrick Zuck	4	0	1	0	5	0
33	GK	(Netherlands) Eric Verstappen	0	0	0	0	0	0
34	FW	(Germany) Phillip Tietz	0	0	0	0	0	0
37	MF	(Germany) Eros Dacaj	2	0	0	0	2	0

== Management and coaching staff ==
Since 12 May 2008 Torsten Lieberknecht is the manager of Eintracht Braunschweig.

Position	Staff
Manager	Torsten Lieberknecht
Assistant manager	Darius Scholtysik
Assistant manager/athletic trainer	Jürgen Rische
Goalkeeping coach	Alexander Kunze
Goalkeeping coach	Daniel Ischdonat
Sporting director	Marc Arnold
