= 2017–18 Holstein Kiel season =

Holstein Kiel
2017–18 season
- Manager: Markus Anfang
- Stadium: Holstein-Stadion
- 2. Bundesliga: 3rd
- DFB-Pokal: Round 2
- Top goalscorer: League: Marvin Ducksch (10 goals); All: Marvin Ducksch (11 goals)
Home colours	Away colours
- All statistics correct as of 18 December 2017.

The 2017–18 Holstein Kiel season is the 118th season in the football club's history. Kiel are playing in the 2. Bundesliga for the first time since 1981, after finishing second in the 2016–17 3. Liga. They also are participating in this season's edition of the domestic cup, the DFB-Pokal. The season covers a period from 1 July 2017 to 30 June 2018.

== Players ==
=== Squad information ===
As of 2 February 2018

Note: Flags indicate national team as defined under FIFA eligibility rules; some limited exceptions apply. Players may hold more than one non-FIFA nationality.

No.	Pos.	Nation	Player
2	DF	GER	Arne Sicker
3	DF	GER	Dominik Schmidt
4	DF	AUT	Niklas Hoheneder
5	DF	GER	Rafael Czichos (captain)
6	DF	GER	David Kinsombi
7	DF	GER	Sebastian Heidinger
8	MF	GER	Alexander Mühling
9	MF	GER	Tom Weilandt (on loan from VfL Bochum)
10	FW	GER	Marvin Ducksch (on loan from FC St. Pauli)
11	MF	GER	Manuel Janzer
12	GK	PHI	Bernd Schipmann
13	MF	GER	Dominic Peitz
14	FW	GER	Aaron Seydel (on loan from Mainz 05)
15	DF	GER	Johannes van den Bergh
16	DF	GER	Christopher Lenz (on loan from Union Berlin)

No.	Pos.	Nation	Player
17	MF	GER	Steven Lewerenz
18	GK	USA	Kenneth Kronholm
19	DF	GER	Patrick Herrmann
20	MF	GER	Joel Gerezgiher
21	MF	GER	Tim Siedschlag
22	MF	GER	Atakan Karazor
23	MF	GER	Luca Dürholtz
24	FW	GER	Dominick Drexler
27	DF	GHA	Kingsley Schindler
28	FW	GER	Noah Awuku
29	MF	GER	Amara Condé (on loan from VfL Wolfsburg)
31	MF	GER	Max Besuschkow (on loan from Eintracht Frankfurt)
34	GK	GER	Lukas Kruse

== Friendly matches ==
Win Draw Loss

23 June 2017	Gettorfer SC	0–13	Holstein Kiel
18:00		Summary

25 June 2017	Tellingstedt	0–9	Holstein Kiel
17:00		Summary

27 June 2017	FC Angeln 02	0–4	Holstein Kiel
18:00		Summary

1 July 2017	Holstein Kiel	2–0	OB
13:00		Summary

5 July 2017	Holstein Kiel	0–0	Shakhtar Donetsk
17:30		Summary

15 July 2017	Sportfreunde Lotte	1–2	Holstein Kiel
14:00		Summary

19 July 2017	Holstein Kiel	5–3	Hamburger SV	Neumünster
19:00		Summary		Stadium: Grümmi-Arena

23 July 2017	SC Weiche Flensburg 08	0–0	Holstein Kiel
14:00		Summary

31 August 2017	Holstein Kiel	3–1	Hamburger SV II
14:00		Summary

6 October 2017	Holstein Kiel	2–1	Werder Bremen II
14:00		Summary

12 January 2018	Holstein Kiel	2–2	Sint-Truiden	La Manga
14:00		Report		Stadium: La Manga Club Football Stadium

16 January 2018	Holstein Kiel	1–2	FC Seoul	La Manga
14:00		Report		Stadium: La Manga Club Football Stadium

26 March 2018	Holstein Kiel	3−2	1. FC Union Berlin	Kiel
14:30	Siedschlag 22'; Weilandt 62'; Janzer 74'	Report	Leistner 8'; Hosiner 63'	Stadium: Leistungszentrum Projensdorf Kunstrasen; Attendance: 644; Referee: Patrick Schult

== Competitions ==
Win Draw Loss

=== Bundesliga ===
==== League table ====
Pos	Team	Pld	W	D	L	GF	GA	GD	Pts	Promotion, qualification or relegation
1	Fortuna Düsseldorf (C, P)	34	19	6	9	57	44	+13	63	Promotion to Bundesliga
2	1. FC Nürnberg (P)	34	17	9	8	61	39	+22	60	Promotion to Bundesliga
3	Holstein Kiel	34	14	14	6	71	44	+27	56	Qualification for promotion play-offs
4	Arminia Bielefeld	34	12	12	10	51	47	+4	48	
5	Jahn Regensburg	34	14	6	14	53	53	0	48	

Source: DFB
Rules for classification: 1) Points; 2) Goal difference; 3) Goals scored
(C) Champions; (P) Promoted

==== Results summary ====
Overall								Home						Away					
Pld	W	D	L	GF	GA	GD	Pts	W	D	L	GF	GA	GD	W	D	L	GF	GA	GD
34	14	14	6	71	44	+27	56	8	7	2	36	19	+17	6	7	4	35	25	+10

Last updated: 13 May 2018.
Source: Bundesliga

==== Results by round ====
Round	1	2	3	4	5	6	7	8	9	10	11	12	13	14	15	16	17	18	19	20	21	22	23	24	25	26	27	28	29	30	31	32	33	34
Ground	H	A	H	A	H	A	H	A	H	A	H	A	H	A	H	H	A	A	H	A	H	A	H	A	H	A	H	A	H	A	H	A	A	H
Result	D	L	W	W	W	W	L	W	W	W	W	D	W	D	D	D	D	L	D	D	D	L	D	L	W	D	W	D	D	W	L	W	D	W
Position	7	11	8	6	3	1	5	3	1	2	2	2	1	1	1	1	1	2	2	4	4	4	4	4	3	3	3	3	3	3	3	3	3	3

Updated to match(es) played on 13 May 2018. Source: kicker
A = Away; H = Home; W = Win; D = Draw; L = Loss

==== Matches ====
30 July 2017 1	Holstein Kiel	2–2	SV Sandhausen	Kiel
15:30	Kronholm (yellow card) 34'; Lewerenz 75'; Ducksch 90+5' (yellow card) 90+5'	Report	Sukuta-Pasu 14' (pen.); Kister (yellow card) 26'; Klingmann 35' (yellow card) 43'; Linsmayer (yellow card) 82'	Stadium: Holstein-Stadion; Attendance: 9,513; Referee: Benjamin Cortus

4 August 2017 2	Union Berlin	4–3	Holstein Kiel	Berlin
18:30	Kreilach 14'; Skrzybski 24' 52'; Hedlund 27'; Kroos (yellow card) 56'; Trimmel (yellow card) 81'	Report	Schindler 12'; Pedersen 16' (o.g.); Drexler 32'; Mühling (yellow card) 55'; Lenz (yellow card) 64'	Stadium: Stadion An der Alten Försterei; Attendance: 21,242; Referee: Frank Willenborg

20 August 2017 3	Holstein Kiel	3–1	Greuther Fürth	Kiel
13:30	Ducksch 25' (yellow card) 84'; Schmidt 32'; Heidinger (yellow card) 69'; Drexler 76' (pen.); Czichos (yellow card) 90+2'	Report	Gjasula 11'; Maloča (yellow card) 78'; Wittek (yellow card) 88'	Stadium: Holstein-Stadion; Attendance: 8,535; Referee: Markus Schmidt

26 August 2017 4	Jahn Regensburg	1–2	Holstein Kiel	Regensburg
13:00	Knoll 43' (yellow card) 90+1'; Sørensen (yellow card) 44'; Grüttner (yellow card) 66'; Stolze (yellow card) 70'	Report	Schindler 20' (yellow card) 88'; Ducksch 30'; Herrmann (yellow card) 53'; Mühling (yellow card) 60'	Stadium: Continental Arena; Attendance: 8,600; Referee: Patrick Alt

9 September 2017 5	Holstein Kiel	2–1	1. FC Kaiserslautern	Kiel
13:00	Schindler (yellow card) 31'; Lewerenz 44'; Schmidt (yellow card) 60'; Weilandt (yellow card) 69'; Vučur 90+3' (o.g.)	Report	Marcel Correia (yellow card) 29'; Andersson 62'; Ziegler (yellow card) 68'	Stadium: Holstein-Stadion; Attendance: 10,318; Referee: Alexander Sather

15 September 2017 6	Erzgebirge Aue	0–3	Holstein Kiel	Aue
18:30	Rapp (yellow card) 19'; Nazarov (yellow card) 55'; Riese (yellow card) 69'	Report	Mühling 15'; Ducksch 41' 77'; Heidinger (yellow card) 84'; Peitz (yellow card) 87'	Stadium: Sparkassen-Erzgebirgsstadion; Attendance: 9,000; Referee: Tobias Stieler

19 September 2017 7	Holstein Kiel	0–1	FC St Pauli	Kiel
18:30	Drexler (yellow card) 43'; Herrmann (yellow card) 53' (yellow-red card); Heidinger (yellow card) 70'	Report	Zander (yellow card) 35'; Bouhaddouz (yellow card) 39'; Flum 44' (yellow card) 87'; Sobiech (yellow card) 45+1'	Stadium: Holstein-Stadion; Attendance: 11,935; Referee: Harm Osmers

22 September 2017 8	MSV Duisburg	1–3	Holstein Kiel	Duisburg
18:30	Hajri (yellow card) 23'; Bomheuer (yellow card) 54'; Flekken (yellow card) 87'; Fröde 90+2'	Report	Schindler 9'; Peitz (yellow card) 56'; Schmidt (yellow card) 60'; Drexler (yellow card) 64' (goal) 73' 88' (pen.)	Stadium: Schauinsland-Reisen-Arena; Attendance: 13,578; Referee: Benjamin Cortus

30 September 2017 9	Holstein Kiel	3–0	VfL Bochum	Kiel
13:00	Riemann 22' (o.g.); Czichos 42'; Drexler 68'	Report	Eisfeld (yellow card) 26'; Tesche (yellow card) 45'; Wurtz (yellow card) 57' (yellow-red card)	Stadium: Holstein-Stadion; Attendance: 10,201; Referee: Patrick Alt

15 October 2017 10	1. FC Heidenheim	3–5	Holstein Kiel	Heidenheim an der Brenz
13:30	Schnatterer 9' 52'; Kraus (yellow card) 26'; Dovedan (yellow card) 37'; Wittek (red card) 42'; Busch 48'; Feick (yellow card) 75'	Report	Ducksch (yellow card) 24' (goal) 40' 43' (pen.) 83'; Czichos (yellow card) 51'; Drexler 53'; Peitz (yellow card) 58'; Kinsombi 81'	Stadium: Voith-Arena; Attendance: 10,300; Referee: Felix Zwayer

21 October 2017 11	Holstein Kiel	2–1	Arminia Bielefeld	Kiel
13:00	Peitz (yellow card) 5'; Weilandt (yellow card) 17'; Drexler (yellow card) 60'; Ducksch 65'; Lewerenz 68' (yellow card) 90+1'	Report	Klos (yellow card) 28'; Teixeira (yellow card) 34'; Börner (yellow card) 45+2'; Czichos 85' (o.g.)	Stadium: Holstein-Stadion; Attendance: 11,224; Referee: Tobias Reichel

28 October 2017 12	Darmstadt 98	1–1	Holstein Kiel	Darmstadt
13:00	Platte 5'; Hamit Altıntop (yellow card) 27'	Report	Kinsombi (yellow card) 33'; Drexler 42'; Mühling (yellow card) 78'; Peitz (yellow card) 88'	Stadium: Merck-Stadion am Böllenfalltor; Attendance: 15,500; Referee: (Germany) Benjamin Brand

5 November 2017 13	Holstein Kiel	3–0	Dynamo Dresden	Kiel
13:30	Ducksch 24'; Kinsombi (yellow card) 69'; Lewerenz 83'; Schindler 88'	Report	Kreuzer (yellow card) 55'	Stadium: Holstein-Stadion; Attendance: 10,487; Referee: (Germany) Rene Rohde

18 November 2017 14	1. FC Nürnberg	2–2	Holstein Kiel	Nuremberg
13:00	Behrens 54'; Ishak 62'; Löwen (yellow card) 77'	Report	van den Bergh (yellow card) 23'; Seydel 70'; Mühling 88' (yellow card) 89'	Stadium: Max-Morlock-Stadion; Attendance: 27,274; Referee: (Germany) Daniel Siebert (referee)

25 November 2017 15	Holstein Kiel	0–0	FC Ingolstadt 04	Kiel
13:00	Kinsombi (yellow card) 28'	Report	Lezcano (yellow card) 66'; Cohen (yellow card) 73'	Stadium: Holstein-Stadion; Attendance: 9,701; Referee: (Germany) Harm Osmers

2 December 2017 16	Holstein Kiel	2–2	Fortuna Düsseldorf	Kiel
13:00	Czichos (yellow card) 28'; Schindler 55'; Drexler 70'	Report	Ayhan (yellow card) 27'; Raman 43'; Zimmer (yellow card) 61'; Hennings 85'	Stadium: Holstein-Stadion; Attendance: 11,748; Referee: (Germany) Martin Petersen

8 December 2017 17	Eintracht Braunschweig	0–0	Holstein Kiel	Braunschweig
18:30	Fejzić (yellow card) 65'	Report	Schmidt (yellow card) 62'; Drexler (yellow card) 86'; Czichos (yellow card) 87'	Stadium: Eintracht-Stadion; Attendance: 21,075; Referee: (Germany) Benedikt Kempkes

17 December 2017 18	SV Sandhausen	3–1	Holstein Kiel	Sandhausen
13:30	Kister (yellow card) 49' (yellow-red card); Paqarada 58' (yellow card) 63'; Höler 61' (pen.); Sukuta-Pasu 71'; Schuhen (yellow card) 86'	Report	Herrmann (yellow card) 19'; Czichos (yellow card) 56'; Schmidt (yellow card) 61' (yellow-red card); Mühling (yellow card) 66'; Peitz 78'	Stadium: BWT-Stadion am Hardtwald; Attendance: 4,829; Referee: (Germany) Thorben Siewer

23 January 2018 19	Holstein Kiel	2–2	Union Berlin	Kiel
20:30	Weilandt (yellow card) 7' (goal) 9'; Drexler 19'; Lewerenz (yellow card) 71'; Kinsombi (red card) 84'	Report	Hartel (yellow card) 22'; Skrzybski 32'; Kroos (yellow card) 71'; Polter 85' (pen.)	Stadium: Holstein-Stadion; Attendance: 11,503; Referee: (Germany) Aarne Aarnink

27 January 2018 20	Greuther Fürth	0–0	Holstein Kiel	Fürth
13:00 CET	Ayçiçek (yellow card) 37'; Gugganig (yellow card) 77'; Caligiuri (yellow card) 82'	Report	Schindler (yellow card) 26'; Herrmann (yellow card) 43'; Drexler (yellow card) 70' van den Bergh (yellow card) 71'	Stadium: Sportpark Ronhof Thomas Sommer; Attendance: 7,755; Referee: Robert Kempter

3 February 2018 21	Holstein Kiel	1–1	Jahn Regensburg	Kiel
13:00 CET	Ducksch 4' (yellow card) 36'; Mühling (yellow card) 27'; Czichos (yellow card) 74'; Herrmann (yellow card) 76'	Report	Gimber (yellow card) 26'; Grüttner 28'; Lais (yellow card) 74'	Stadium: Holstein-Stadion; Attendance: 9,506; Referee: Martin Thomsen

9 February 2018 22	1. FC Kaiserslautern	3–1	Holstein Kiel	Kaiserslautern
18:30 CET	Borrello 2'; Moritz 45' (pen.) (yellow card) 81'; Osawe 51'	Report	Hermann (yellow card) 5'; Ducksch (penalty missed) 13'; Kinsombi (yellow card) 24' (goal) 32' van den Bergh (yellow card) 84'	Stadium: Fritz-Walter-Stadion; Attendance: 20,664; Referee: Guido Winkmann

17 February 2018 23	Holstein Kiel	2–2	Erzgebirge Aue	Kiel
13:00 CET	Heidinger (yellow card) 1'; Ducksch 12'; Drexler 25'	Report	Cacutalua 36', 38'; Köpke (yellow card) 67'; Fandrich (yellow card) 71'	Stadium: Holstein-Stadion; Attendance: 9,702; Referee: Daniel Schlager

25 February 2018 24	FC St Pauli	3–2	Holstein Kiel	St. Pauli
13:30	Neudecker 11', 74'; Nehrig (yellow card) 25'; Avevor 89'	Report	Schindler 14'; Czichos (yellow card) 16'; Ducksch 19'; Peitz (yellow card) 31'; Van den Bergh (yellow card) 83'	Stadium: Millerntor-Stadion; Attendance: 29,546; Referee: Felix Brych

3 March 2018 25	Holstein Kiel	5–0	MSV Duisburg	Kiel
		Report		Stadium: Holstein-Stadion

10 March 2018 26	VfL Bochum	1–1	Holstein Kiel	Bochum
		Report		Stadium: Vonovia Ruhrstadion

16 March 2018 27	Holstein Kiel	2–1	1. FC Heidenheim	Kiel
		Report		Stadium: Holstein-Stadion

1 April 2018 28	Arminia Bielefeld	1–1	Holstein Kiel	Bielefeld
		Report		Stadium: SchücoArena

7 April 2018 29	Holstein Kiel	0–0	Darmstadt 98	Kiel
		Report		Stadium: Holstein-Stadion

14 April 2018 30	Dynamo Dresden	0–4	Holstein Kiel	Dresden
		Report		Stadium: DDV-Stadion

23 April 2018 31	Holstein Kiel	1–3	1. FC Nürnberg	Kiel
		Report		Stadium: Holstein-Stadion

29 April 2018 32	FC Ingolstadt 04	1–5	Holstein Kiel	Ingolstadt
		Report		Stadium: Audi Sportpark

6 May 2018 33	Fortuna Düsseldorf	1–1	Holstein Kiel	Düsseldorf
		Report		Stadium: Esprit Arena

13 May 2018 34	Holstein Kiel	6–2	Eintracht Braunschweig	Kiel
		Report		Stadium: Holstein-Stadion

=== DFB-Pokal ===
11 August 2017 First round	Holstein Kiel	2–1	Eintracht Braunschweig	Kiel
20:45 CEST (UTC+2)	Drexler 71' (pen.); Ducksch 77'	Report	Nyman 48'	Stadium: Holstein-Stadion; Attendance: 10,052; Referee: Guido Winkmann

24 October 2017 Second round	Mainz 05	3–2	Holstein Kiel	Mainz
20:45 CEST (UTC+2)	Fischer 22'; Fischer 67'; Brosinski 101'	Report	Schindler 54' (pen.); Drexler 75' (pen.)	Stadium: Opel Arena; Attendance: 10,441; Referee: Daniel Schlager
