= 2018–19 1. FC Köln season =

1. FC Köln
2018–19 season
- President: Werner Spinner
- Manager: Markus Anfang (until 27 April); André Pawlak (interim, from 27 April)
- Stadium: RheinEnergieStadion
- 2. Bundesliga: 1st (promoted)
- DFB-Pokal: Second round
- Top goalscorer: League: Simon Terodde (29 goals); All: Simon Terodde (34 goals)
- Highest home attendance: 50,000
- Lowest home attendance: 45,900
- Average home league attendance: 49,547
- Biggest win: BFC Dynamo 1–9 Köln
- Biggest defeat: Dynamo Dresden 3–0 Köln
Home colours	Away colours
- All statistics correct as of 15 July 2019.

The 2018–19 1. FC Köln season was the 71st season in the football club's history and 1st consecutive and 9th overall season in the second flight of German football, the 2. Bundesliga, having been relegated from the Bundesliga in 2018. In addition to the domestic league, 1. FC Köln also participated in this season's edition of the domestic cup the DFB-Pokal. This was the 71st season for Köln in the RheinEnergieStadion, located in Cologne, North Rhine-Westphalia, Germany. The season covered a period from 1 July 2018 to 30 June 2019.

== Competitions ==
Win Draw Loss

=== Overview ===
Competition	First match	Last match	Starting round	Final position	Record							
Competition	First match	Last match	Starting round	Final position	Pld	W	D	L	GF	GA	GD	Win %
2. Bundesliga	4 August 2018	19 May 2019	Matchday 1	Winners	34	19	6	9	84	47	+37	55.88
DFB-Pokal	19 August 2018	31 October 2018	First round	Second round	2	1	1	0	10	2	+8	50.00
Total					36	20	7	9	94	49	+45	55.56

Last updated: 21 May 2018
Source: Competitions

=== 2. Bundesliga ===
==== League table ====
Pos	Team	Pld	W	D	L	GF	GA	GD	Pts	Promotion, qualification or relegation
1	1. FC Köln (C, P)	34	19	6	9	84	47	+37	63	Promotion to Bundesliga
2	SC Paderborn (P)	34	16	9	9	76	50	+26	57	Promotion to Bundesliga
3	Union Berlin (O, P)	34	14	15	5	54	33	+21	57	Qualification for promotion play-offs
4	Hamburger SV	34	16	8	10	45	42	+3	56	
5	1. FC Heidenheim	34	15	10	9	55	45	+10	55	

Source: DFB
Rules for classification: 1) Points; 2) Goal difference; 3) Goals scored; 4) Head-to-head points; 5) Head-to-head goal difference; 6) Head-to-head goals scored; 7) Head-to-head away goals scored; 8) Away goals scored; 9) Play-off.
(C) Champions; (O) Play-off winners; (P) Promoted

==== Results summary ====
Overall								Home						Away					
Pld	W	D	L	GF	GA	GD	Pts	W	D	L	GF	GA	GD	W	D	L	GF	GA	GD
34	19	6	9	84	47	+37	63	9	3	5	49	26	+23	10	3	4	35	21	+14

Last updated: 19 May 2019.
Source: Bundesliga

==== Results by round ====
Round	1	2	3	4	5	6	7	8	9	10	11	12	13	14	15	16	17	18	19	20	21	22	23	24	25	26	27	28	29	30	31	32	33	34
Ground	A	H	H	A	H	A	H	A	H	A	H	A	H	A	H	A	H	H	A	H	A	H	A	A	H	H	A	A	H	A	H	A	H	A
Result	W	D	W	W	L	W	W	W	L	D	D	L	W	W	W	W	W	L	L	W	W	L	W	W	W	D	W	W	D	L	L	W	L	D
Position	3	4	1	1	4	1	1	1	1	1	3	2	2	2	2	2	2	2	2	2	2	2	1	1	1	1	1	1	1	1	1	1	1	1

Updated to match(es) played on 19 May 2019. Source: Bundesliga
A = Away; H = Home; W = Win; D = Draw; L = Loss

==== Matches ====
4 August 2018 1	VfL Bochum	0–2	1. FC Köln	Bochum
13:00 CEST (UTC+2)	Soares (yellow card) 32'; Hoogland (yellow card) 43'; Leitsch (yellow card) 58'	Report	Leitsch 44' (o.g.); Meré (yellow card) 50' (yellow-red card) 71'; Czichos 59'	Stadium: Vonovia Ruhrstadion; Attendance: 26,600; Referee: Felix Zwayer

13 August 2018 2	1. FC Köln	1–1	1. FC Union Berlin	Cologne
20:30 CEST (UTC+2)	Horn (yellow card) 39'; Clemens 41'; Sobiech (yellow card) 61'	Report	Reichel (yellow card) 19'; Andersson 69'	Stadium: RheinEnergieStadion; Attendance: 50,000; Referee: Daniel Schlager

25 August 2018 3	1. FC Köln	3–1	Erzgebirge Aue	Cologne
13:00 CEST (UTC+2)	Terodde 26', 69', 89'; Czichos (yellow card) 71'	Report	Fandrich 29'; Riese (yellow card) 38'; Kempe (yellow card) 66'; Tiffert (yellow card) 86'; Rapp (yellow card) 90'	Stadium: RheinEnergieStadion; Attendance: 48,000; Referee: Marco Fritz

2 September 2018 4	FC St. Pauli	3–5	1. FC Köln	St. Pauli
13:30 CEST (UTC+2)	Veerman 13'; Dudziak 25'; Dæhli (yellow card) 27'; Buchtmann 65'	Report	Clemens 35'; Terodde 45', 53'; Guirassy 57'; Sobiech (yellow card) 79'; Hauptmann (yellow card) 90+1'; Özcan 90+6'	Stadium: Millerntor-Stadion; Attendance: 29,546; Referee: Benjamin Cortus

16 September 2018 5	1. FC Köln	3–5	SC Paderborn	Cologne
13:30 CEST (UTC+2)	Terodde 37', 53'; Czichos (yellow card) 58'; Hector (yellow card) 81' (yellow-red card) 87'; Córdoba 84' (yellow card) 85'	Report	Guèye 38'; Gjasula (yellow card) 41'; Klement 66', 71' (yellow card) 90+3'; Tekpetey 89'; Michel 90+4'	Stadium: RheinEnergieStadion; Attendance: 50,000; Referee: Marco Fritz

21 September 2018 6	SV Sandhausen	0–2	1. FC Köln	Sandhausen
18:30 CEST (UTC+2)	Gíslason (yellow card) 19'; Jansen (yellow card) 58'	Report	Höger (yellow card) 14'; Schaub 45' (yellow card) 73'; Terodde 54'; Drexler (yellow card) 64'	Stadium: BWT-Stadion am Hardtwald; Attendance: 13,237; Referee: Patrick Ittrich

25 September 2018 7	1. FC Köln	2–1	FC Ingolstadt	Cologne
18:30 CEST (UTC+2)	Hector (yellow card) 67'; Terodde 70', 85'	Report	Lezcano (yellow card) 36'; Gimber (yellow card) 51'; Kittel 53'; Krauße (yellow card) 57'; Otávio (yellow card) 79'	Stadium: RheinEnergieStadion; Attendance: 45,900; Referee: Arne Aarnink

28 September 2018 8	Arminia Bielefeld	1–3	1. FC Köln	Bielefeld
18:30 CEST (UTC+2)	Hartherz (yellow card) 38'; Staude 85'; Salger (yellow card) 90+1'	Report	Bader (yellow card) 40'; Terodde 45', 70'; Drexler (yellow card) 83'; Córdoba 90+5'	Stadium: Bielefelder Alm; Attendance: 26,283; Referee: Daniel Siebert

8 October 2018 9	1. FC Köln	1–2	MSV Duisburg	Cologne
20:30 CEST (UTC+2)	Koziello (yellow card) 27'; Hector 35' (yellow card) 72'; J. Horn (yellow card) 90+3'	Report	Cauly 10' (yellow card) 90+4'; Iljutcenko (yellow card) 33'; Bader 73' (o.g.)	Stadium: RheinEnergieStadion; Attendance: 49,600; Referee: Florian Badstübner

21 October 2018 10	Holstein Kiel	1–1	1. FC Köln	Kiel
13:00 CEST (UTC+2)	Okugawa (yellow card) 87'; Mörschel 88'	Report	Terodde 42' (pen.); Özcan (yellow card) 72'; Schmitz (yellow card) 76'; J. Horn (yellow card) 90'	Stadium: Holstein-Stadion; Attendance: 9,700; Referee: Robert Kampka

27 October 2018 11	1. FC Köln	1–1	1. FC Heidenheim	Cologne
13:00 CEST (UTC+2)	Höger (yellow card) 1'; Hector (yellow card) 45+1'; Guirassy 58'	Report	Beermann 9' (yellow card) 88'; Dorsch (yellow card) 45+2'; Griesbeck (yellow card) 66'	Stadium: RheinEnergieStadion; Attendance: 50,000; Referee: Tobias Stieler

5 November 2018 12	Hamburger SV	1–0	1. FC Köln	Hamburg
20:30 CET (UTC+1)	Santos (yellow card) 29'; Lasogga 86'	Report	Höger (yellow card) 44'; Özcan (yellow card) 64'; Hector (yellow card) 77'	Stadium: Volksparkstadion; Attendance: 53,876; Referee: Christian Dingert

10 November 2018 13	1. FC Köln	8–1	Dynamo Dresden	Cologne
13:00 CET (UTC+1)	Córdoba 3', 51'; Terodde (yellow card) 31' (goal) 42', 46', 61'; Hector 56', 83'; Czichos (yellow card) 75'; Schaub 78'	Report	Hartmann (yellow card) 59'; Atik 72' (yellow card) 88'; Berko (yellow card) 87'	Stadium: RheinEnergieStadion; Attendance: 50,000; Referee: Felix Brych

24 November 2018 14	Darmstadt 98	0–3	1. FC Köln	Darmstadt
13:00 CET (UTC+1)	Stark (yellow card) 8'; Franke (yellow card) 60'; Rieder (yellow card) 61'	Report	Höger (yellow card) 44'; Terodde 55'; Czichos 66'; Córdoba 70'	Stadium: Merck-Stadion am Böllenfalltor; Attendance: 17,400; Referee: Florian Heft

1 December 2018 15	1. FC Köln	4–0	Greuther Fürth	Cologne
13:00 CET (UTC+1)	Drexler 17'; Terodde 52', 78'; Córdoba 60'	Report	Bauer (yellow card) 42' (yellow-red card) 51'; Wittek (yellow card) 57'	Stadium: RheinEnergieStadion; Attendance: 49,700; Referee: Sören Storks

7 December 2018 16	SSV Jahn Regensburg	1–3	1. FC Köln	Regensburg
18:30 CET (UTC+1)	Adamyan 55'; Saller (yellow card) 74'; Grüttner (yellow card) 87'; Weis (yellow card) 88'; Correia (red card) 89'	Report	Terodde 11'; J. Horn (yellow card) 22'; Schmitz (yellow card) 29'; Czichos (yellow card) 32'; Drexler 41', 55'; T. Horn (yellow card) 80'	Stadium: Continental Arena; Attendance: 15,210; Referee: Christof Günsch

17 December 2018 17	1. FC Köln	3–0	1. FC Magdeburg	Cologne
20:30 CET (UTC+1)	Córdoba 33'; Drexler 48'; Höger (yellow card) 86'; Terodde 90+2'	Report		Stadium: RheinEnergieStadion; Attendance: 49,500; Referee: Tobias Stieler

21 December 2018 18	1. FC Köln	2–3	VfL Bochum	Cologne
13:30 CET (UTC+1)	Córdoba (yellow card) 19'; Terodde 24'; Risse (yellow card) 32' (goal) 76'; Hector (yellow card) 75'	Report	Hinterseer 1', 58' (yellow card) 17'; Gyamerah (yellow card) 32'; Losilla (yellow card) 55'; Sam 69'; Hoogland (yellow card) 83'	Stadium: RheinEnergieStadion; Attendance: 50,000; Referee: Benjamin Cortus

31 January 2019 19	1. FC Union Berlin	2–0	1. FC Köln	Berlin
20:30 CET (UTC+1)	Hartel 1'; Trimmel (yellow card) 29'; Hübner 30'; Friedrich (yellow card) 50'; Reichel (yellow card) 58' (yellow-red card) 66'	Report	Terodde (yellow card) 45+2'; Geis (yellow card) 73'; Schmitz (yellow card) 78'	Stadium: Stadion An der Alten Försterei; Attendance: 22,012; Referee: Tobias Welz

8 February 2019 21	1. FC Köln	4–1	FC St. Pauli	Cologne
18:30 CET (UTC+1)	Córdoba 32', 53', 58' (yellow card) 54'; Terodde 85'	Report	Meier 38'; Carstens (yellow card) 47'	Stadium: RheinEnergieStadion; Attendance: 50,000; Referee: Sören Storks

15 February 2019 22	SC Paderborn	3–2	1. FC Köln	Paderborn
18:30 CET (UTC+1)	Strohdiek (yellow card) 56'; Michel (yellow card) 77'; Tekpetey 80'; Pröger 85'; Ritter 90+2' (yellow card) 90+3'	Report	Córdoba 38'; Schmitz (yellow card) 25'; Czichos (yellow card) 39'; Terodde (yellow card) 46'; Kainz (yellow card) 47' (yellow-red card) 89'; Modeste 73'; Sørensen (yellow card) 79'	Stadium: Benteler-Arena; Attendance: 15,000; Referee: Sven Waschitzki

23 February 2019 23	1. FC Köln	3–1	SV Sandhausen	Cologne
13:00 CET (UTC+1)	Drexler 49'; Koziello (yellow card) 52'; Modeste 83', 90+5'	Report	Wooten 4'; Kister (yellow card) 11'; Diekmeier (yellow card) 45'; Taffertshofer (yellow card) 88'; Förster (yellow card) 90+1'	Stadium: RheinEnergieStadion; Attendance: 49,600; Referee: Manuel Gräfe

27 February 2019 20	Erzgebirge Aue	0–1	1. FC Köln	Aue
19:30 CET (UTC+1)	Rizzuto (yellow card) 29'; Samson (yellow card) 47'	Report	Drexler (yellow card) 32'; Höger 35'; Czichos (yellow card) 78'; Córdoba (yellow card) 86'	Stadium: Erzgebirgsstadion; Attendance: 13,089; Referee: Martin Petersen

3 March 2019 24	FC Ingolstadt	1–2	1. FC Köln	Ingolstadt
13:30 CET (UTC+1)	Kotzke (yellow card) 39'; Mavraj (yellow card) 42'; Kittel (yellow card) 65'; Paulsen 90+1'	Report	Meré (yellow card) 16'; Modeste 40'; Höger (yellow card) 43'; Drexler 59'; Schaub (yellow card) 90+2'; Kainz (yellow card) 90+4'	Stadium: Audi Sportpark; Attendance: 11,042; Referee: Florian Heft

9 March 2019 25	1. FC Köln	5–1	Arminia Bielefeld	Cologne
13:00 CET (UTC+1)	Drexler 14'; Terodde 21', 69', 90'; Córdoba 48'	Report	Voglsammer 71'	Stadium: RheinEnergieStadion; Attendance: 50,000; Referee: Marco Fritz

31 March 2019 27	1. FC Köln	4–0	Holstein Kiel	Cologne
13:30 CEST (UTC+2)	Meré (yellow card) 13'; Terodde 22'; Hector 25'; Córdoba 46'; Modeste 90+1'	Report	Schmidt (yellow card) 7'	Stadium: RheinEnergieStadion; Attendance: 50,000; Referee: Deniz Aytekin

7 April 2019 28	1. FC Heidenheim	0−2	1. FC Köln	Heidenheim an der Brenz
13:30 CEST (UTC+2)	Andrich (yellow card) 64'	Report	Drexler 10'; Córdoba 41'; Modeste (yellow card) 44'; Czichos (yellow card) 64'	Stadium: Voith-Arena; Attendance: 15,000; Referee: Matthias Jöllenbeck

10 April 2019 26	MSV Duisburg	4–4	1. FC Köln	Duisburg
18:30 CEST (UTC+2)	Stoppelkamp 2', 71'; Fröde 29'; Albutat (yellow card) 45+1'; Wolze (yellow card) 65' (goal) 81'; Wiedwald (yellow card) 72'	Report	Córdoba 24', 53'; Schaub 47'; Terodde 54'; Sobiech (yellow card) 74'	Stadium: Schauinsland-Reisen-Arena; Attendance: 25,675; Referee: Daniel Schlager

15 April 2019 29	1. FC Köln	1–1	Hamburger SV	Cologne
20:30 CEST (UTC+2)	Drexler 26'; Terodde (yellow card) 39'; Kainz (yellow card) 47'; Hector (yellow card) 66'; Meré (yellow card) 74'	Report	Jung (yellow card) 49' van Drongelen (yellow card) 56'; Wintzheimer 85' (yellow card) 87'	Stadium: RheinEnergieStadion; Attendance: 50,000; Referee: Robert Hartmann

21 April 2019 30	Dynamo Dresden	3–0	1. FC Köln	Dresden
13:30 CEST (UTC+2)	Berko 12', 66'; Duljevic 35'; Atik (yellow card) 41'; Burnic (yellow card) 61'; Nikolaou (yellow card) 81'	Report	Höger (yellow card) 15'; Hector (yellow card) 38'; Meré (yellow card) 66'; Kainz (yellow card) 90+2'	Stadium: Rudolf-Harbig-Stadion; Attendance: 30,753; Referee: Robert Schröder

26 April 2019 31	1. FC Köln	1–2	SV Darmstadt 98	Cologne
18:30 CEST (UTC+2)	Córdoba 66'; Drexler (yellow card) 79'	Report	Dursun 34' (yellow card) 90+1'; Holland (yellow card) 56'; Platte 76' (yellow card) 90'	Stadium: RheinEnergieStadion; Attendance: 50,000; Referee: Marco Fritz

6 May 2019 32	Greuther Fürth	0–4	1. FC Köln	Fürth
20:30 CEST (UTC+2)	Steininger (yellow card) 32'	Report	Córdoba 8', 41', 65'; Steininger 20' (o.g.)	Stadium: Sportpark Ronhof Thomas Sommer; Attendance: 12,520; Referee: Guido Winkmann

12 May 2019 33	1. FC Köln	3–5	SSV Jahn Regensburg	Cologne
15:30 CEST (UTC+2)	Höger (yellow card) 44'; Hector (yellow card) 45+1' (goal) 65', 73'; Córdoba (red card) 45+3'; Meré (yellow card) 56'; Modeste (yellow card) 71' (goal) 76'; Drexler (yellow card) 83'	Report	Czichos 7' (o.g.); Adamyan 34', 68'; Al Ghaddioui 45+5' (pen.) (yellow card) 49'; Grüttner (yellow card) 88'; Föhrenbach 90'	Stadium: RheinEnergieStadion; Attendance: 50,000; Referee: Robert Kampka

19 May 2019 34	1. FC Magdeburg	1–1	1. FC Köln	Magdeburg
15:30 CEST (UTC+2)	Müller (yellow card) 34'; Rother (yellow card) 52'; Lohkemper 53'	Report	Terodde 3'; Sobiech (yellow card) 28'; Schaub (yellow card) 34'	Stadium: MDCC-Arena; Attendance: 18,902; Referee: Sven Waschitzki

=== DFB-Pokal ===
19 August 2018 First round	BFC Dynamo	1–9	1. FC Köln	Berlin
15:30 CEST (UTC+2)	Twardzik 19'; Çepni (yellow card) 31'; Lambach (yellow card) 55'; Silva (yellow card) 65'	Report	Terodde 21', 34', 41', 75'; Drexler 44', 66'; Risse 58'; Koziello 61'; Höger (yellow card) 72'; Schaub 86'	Stadium: Olympiastadion; Attendance: 14,357; Referee: Johann Pfeifer

31 October 2018 Second round	1. FC Köln	1–1 (a.e.t.) (5–6 p)	Schalke 04	Cologne
18:30 CET (UTC+1)	Córdoba 43'; Özcan (yellow card) 61'; Schaub (yellow card) 84'	Report	Schöpf (yellow card) 51'; Uth (yellow card) 63'; Bentaleb (yellow card) 84', (goal) 88' (pen.); Burgstaller (yellow card) 100'; Nastasić (yellow card) 110'	Stadium: RheinEnergieStadion; Attendance: 50,000; Referee: Harm Osmers
	Penalties
	Höger (penalty missed); Özcan (penalty scored); Terodde (penalty scored); Guirassy (penalty scored); Risse (penalty scored); Hector (penalty scored); Drexler (penalty missed)		(penalty scored) Burgstaller; (penalty scored) Nastasić; (penalty scored) Caligiuri; (penalty scored) Harit; (penalty missed) Bentaleb; (penalty scored) Rudy; (penalty scored) Uth

== Statistics ==
=== Appearances and goals ===
No.	Pos	Nat	Player	Total		2. Bundesliga		DFB-Pokal	
No.	Pos	Nat	Player	Apps	Goals	Apps	Goals	Apps	Goals
Goalkeepers
1	GK	(Germany) GER	Timo Horn	35	0	33	0	2	0
18	GK	(Germany) GER	Thomas Kessler	1	0	1	0	0	0
28	GK	(Germany) GER	Jan-Christoph Bartels	0	0	0	0	0	0
Defenders
2	DF	(Germany) GER	Benno Schmitz	15	0	14+1	0	0	0
3	DF	(Germany) GER	Lasse Sobiech	17	0	9+8	0	0	0
4	DF	(Denmark) DEN	Frederik Sørensen	5	0	0+5	0	0	0
5	DF	(Germany) GER	Rafael Czichos	34	2	32	2	2	0
22	DF	(Spain) ESP	Jorge Meré	28	0	26	0	2	0
23	DF	(Germany) GER	Jannes Horn	19	0	12+6	0	1	0
34	DF	(Germany) GER	Noah Katterbach	0	0	0	0	0	0
35	DF	(Germany) GER	Matthias Bader	4	0	4	0	0	0
Midfielders
6	MF	(Germany) GER	Marco Höger	28	1	22+4	1	1+1	0
7	MF	(Germany) GER	Marcel Risse	23	2	18+3	1	2	1
8	MF	(Germany) GER	Johannes Geis	14	0	13+1	0	0	0
13	MF	(Austria) AUT	Louis Schaub	29	4	20+7	3	2	1
14	MF	(Germany) GER	Jonas Hector	31	6	29	6	2	0
17	MF	(Germany) GER	Christian Clemens	21	2	18+2	2	1	0
20	MF	(Germany) GER	Salih Özcan	17	1	7+8	1	1+1	0
21	MF	(France) FRA	Vincent Koziello	15	1	6+8	0	1	1
24	MF	(Germany) GER	Dominick Drexler	35	11	33	9	2	2
30	MF	(Austria) AUT	Florian Kainz	14	0	14	0	0	0
33	MF	(Germany) GER	Matthias Lehmann	4	0	0+4	0	0	0
36	MF	(Germany) GER	Niklas Hauptmann	12	0	5+7	0	0	0
38	MF	(Denmark) DEN	Nikolas Nartey	1	0	0+1	0	0	0
Forwards
9	FW	(Germany) GER	Simon Terodde	35	33	28+5	29	1+1	4
11	FW	(Ghana) GHA	Kingsley Schindler	3	0	0+2	0	0+1	0
15	FW	(Colombia) COL	Jhon Córdoba	33	21	22+9	20	1+1	1
27	FW	(France) FRA	Anthony Modeste	10	6	3+7	6	0	0
Players transferred out during the season
19	FW	(France) FRA	Serhou Guirassy	17	2	5+11	2	1	0

Last updated: 19 May 2019
Source: Soccerway
