= Daniel Ischdonat =

German footballer

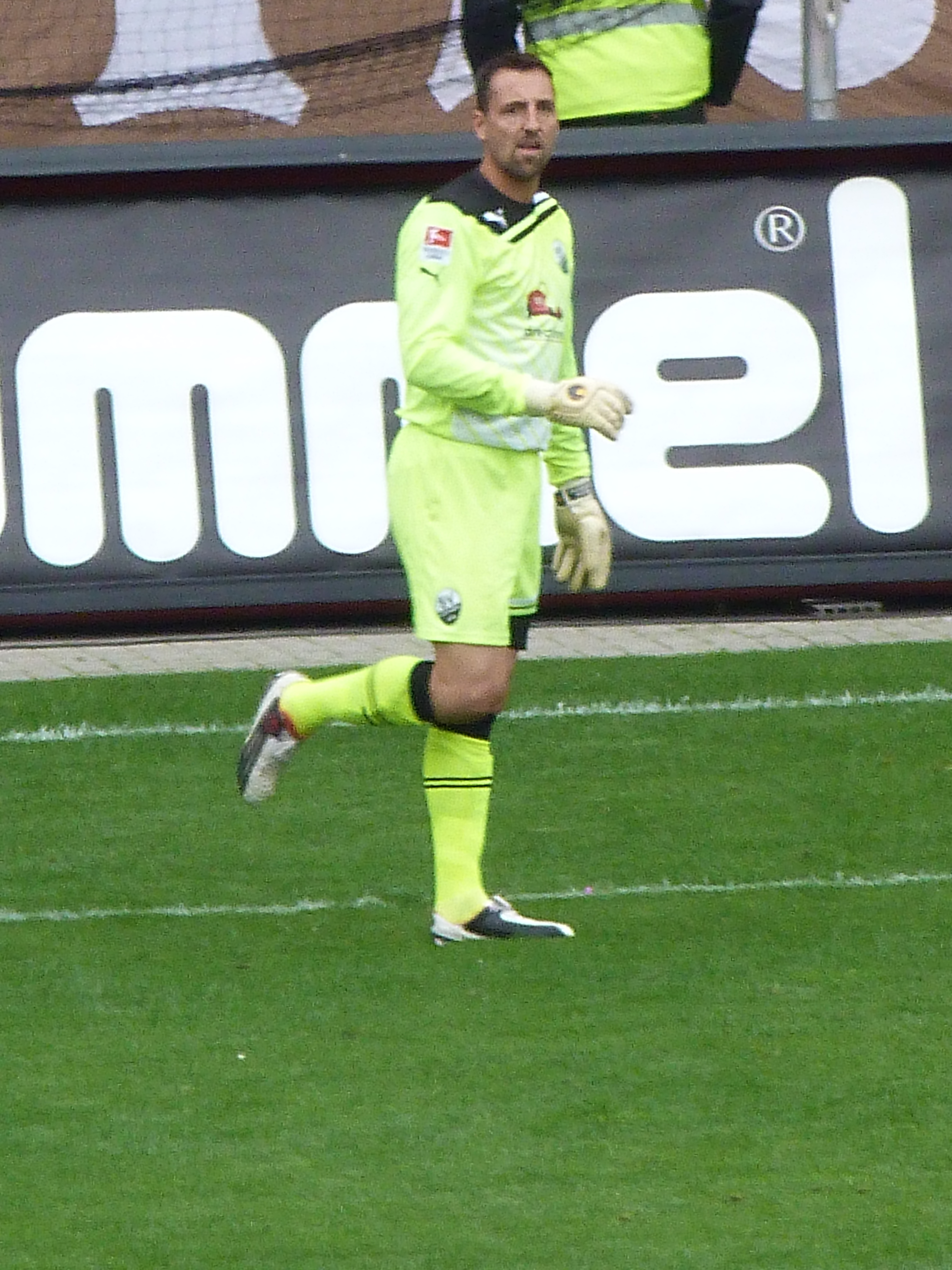
- Ischdonat with SV Sandhausen

Personal information
- Date of birth: 9 June 1976 (age 50)
- Place of birth: Leverkusen, West Germany
- Height: 1.85 m (6 ft 1 in)
- Position: Goalkeeper

Team information
- Current team: SV Sandhausen (goalkeeping coach)

Youth career
- Bayer Leverkusen

Senior career*
Years	Team	Apps	(Gls)
1995–1996	Bayer Leverkusen II		
1996–2006	Eintracht Trier	124	(0)
2006–2009	Mainz 05	16	(0)
2010	FSV Frankfurt	1	(0)
2010–2013	SV Sandhausen	79	(0)
Total		220	(0)
- * Club domestic league appearances and goals

Daniel Ischdonat (born 9 June 1976) is a German former professional footballer, and the current first team goalkeeping coach at SV Sandhausen.

== Playing career ==
Ischdonat made his professional league level debut in the 2. Bundesliga for Eintracht Trier on 10 August 2002 when he started in a game against SV Wacker Burghausen.

== Coaching career ==
From 2013 to 2017, Ischdonat worked as goalkeeping coach at SV Sandhausen. In 2017, Ischdonat temporarily replaced the injured Alexander Kunze as goalkeeping coach at Eintracht Braunschweig. He returned to Sandhausen at the beginning of the 2017–18 season.
