= Jorge Meré =

Spanish footballer (born 1997)

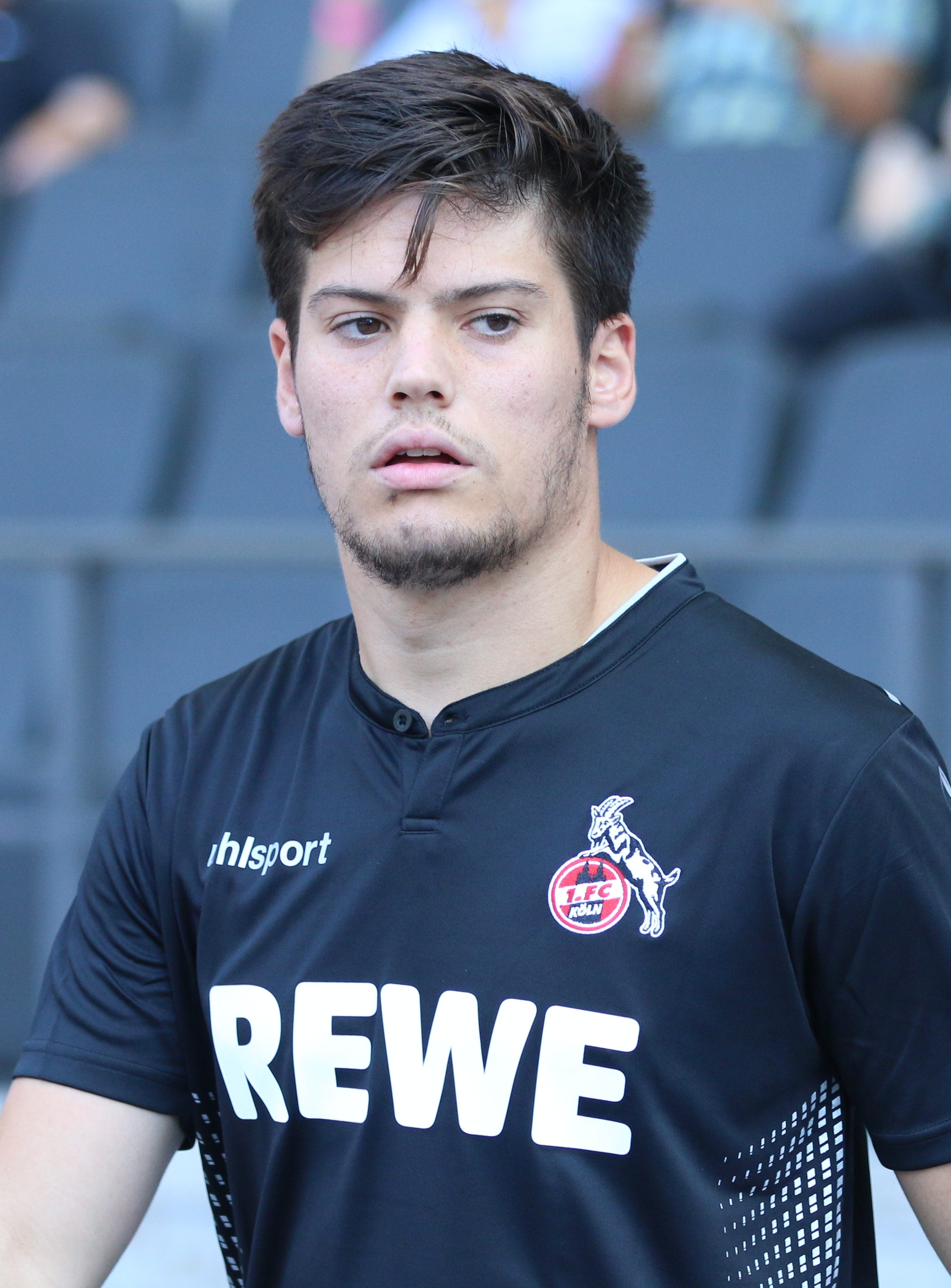
- Meré with Köln in 2018

Personal information
- Full name: Jorge Meré Pérez
- Date of birth: 17 April 1997 (age 29)
- Place of birth: Oviedo, Spain
- Height: 1.82 m (6 ft 0 in)
- Position: Centre-back

Team information
- Current team: Penafiel
- Number: 3

Youth career
- 2005–2010: Oviedo
- 2010–2014: Sporting Gijón

Senior career*
| Years | Team | Apps | (Gls) |
| 2013–2015 | Sporting Gijón B | 47 | (3) |
| 2015–2017 | Sporting Gijón | 61 | (0) |
| 2017–2022 | 1. FC Köln | 83 | (2) |
| 2022–2024 | América | 10 | (0) |
| 2022 | → Mazatlán (loan) | 6 | (0) |
| 2023–2024 | → Cádiz (loan) | 20 | (0) |
| 2026– | Penafiel | 11 | (1) |

International career
| 2013–2014 | Spain U17 | 10 | (2) |
| 2014 | Spain U18 | 2 | (0) |
| 2014–2016 | Spain U19 | 16 | (0) |
| 2015–2019 | Spain U21 | 31 | (3) |
Medal record
Representing Spain
| Winner | European U19 Championship | 2015 |
- * Club domestic league appearances and goals as of 19:18, 8 November 2026 (UTC)

Jorge Meré Pérez (Spanish pronunciation: [ˈxoɾxe meˈɾe ˈpeɾeθ]; born 17 April 1997) is a Spanish professional footballer who plays as a centre-back for Liga Portugal 2 club Penafiel.

== Club career ==
=== Sporting Gijón ===
Born in Oviedo, Asturias, Meré joined Sporting de Gijón's youth setup in 2010 after starting out at neighbours Real Oviedo, and he made his senior debut with the reserves in the 2013–14 season (aged only 16), in the Segunda División B. On 24 July 2014, he signed a new five-year deal with the club, with a €25 million release clause.

In January 2015, Meré was linked to Newcastle United, but nothing came of it. On 11 April, he played his first game as a professional, starting in a 1–1 away draw against Real Zaragoza in the Segunda División.

Meré appeared in five matches for the first team during the campaign, as they returned to La Liga after a three-year absence. He made his debut in the competition on 23 September 2015, starting in a 2–1 away loss to Rayo Vallecano.

Meré contributed 25 appearances during 2015–16, overcoming Bernardo Espinosa (who was sidelined due to an injury), Igor Lichnovsky and Ognjen Vranješ as his side avoided relegation in the last matchday. He was named Sporting's player of the season, with his father accepting the award on his behalf.

=== 1. FC Köln ===
On 20 July 2017, Meré joined 1. FC Köln on a five-year contract for a fee believed to be between €8.5 million and €9 million, becoming the highest transfer ever received by Sporting. His first game in the Bundesliga took place on 9 September, when he played the second half of a 3–0 away loss against FC Augsburg.

Meré scored his first goal as a professional on 2 February 2018, but in a 2–3 home defeat to Borussia Dortmund.

=== América ===
On 18 January 2022, Meré agreed to a deal at Club América of the Mexican Liga MX. In August, he was loaned to Mazatlán F.C. in the same country and league.

Meré returned to Spain and its top flight in January 2023, on loan to Cádiz CF until 30 June.

=== Penafiel ===
On 21 January 2026, the free agent Meré signed a short-term contract with Liga Portugal 2 club F.C. Penafiel.

== International career ==
Meré represented Spain at every age group level, from the under-15 to the under-21s. In 2012 he appeared for the former at the Mexico Cup of Nations, and was part of the under-19 squad who won the UEFA European Championship in 2015; earlier in that year, aged only 18, he earned his first cap for the under-21 team, in a 4–0 win over Belarus.

In May 2016, 19-year-old Meré was called up to the full squad for the first time, for a friendly against Bosnia and Herzegovina.

== Career statistics ==
As of match played 4 June 2023

Appearances and goals by club, season and competition
| Club | Season | League | | | National cup | | Continental | | Other | | Total | |
| Club | Season | Division | Apps | Goals | Apps | Goals | Apps | Goals | Apps | Goals | Apps | Goals |
|---|---|---|---|---|---|---|---|---|---|---|---|---|
| Sporting Gijón B | 2013–14 | Segunda División B | 19 | 0 | — | | — | | — | | 19 | 0 |
| Sporting Gijón B | 2014–15 | Segunda División B | 28 | 3 | — | | — | | — | | 28 | 3 |
| Sporting Gijón B | Total | | 47 | 3 | 0 | 0 | 0 | 0 | 0 | 0 | 47 | 3 |
| Sporting Gijón | 2014–15 | Segunda División | 5 | 0 | 0 | 0 | — | | — | | 5 | 0 |
| Sporting Gijón | 2015–16 | La Liga | 25 | 0 | 1 | 0 | — | | — | | 26 | 0 |
| Sporting Gijón | 2016–17 | La Liga | 31 | 0 | 1 | 0 | — | | — | | 32 | 0 |
| Sporting Gijón | Total | | 61 | 0 | 2 | 0 | 0 | 0 | 0 | 0 | 63 | 0 |
| 1. FC Köln | 2017–18 | Bundesliga | 22 | 1 | 1 | 0 | 3 (Note: Appearances in UEFA Europa League) | 0 | — | | 26 | 1 |
| 1. FC Köln | 2018–19 | 2. Bundesliga | 26 | 0 | 2 | 0 | — | | — | | 28 | 0 |
| 1. FC Köln | 2019–20 | Bundesliga | 11 | 1 | 2 | 0 | — | | — | | 13 | 1 |
| 1. FC Köln | 2020–21 | Bundesliga | 16 | 0 | 3 | 0 | — | | 1 (Note: Appearance in Bundesliga relegation playoffs) | 0 | 20 | 0 |
| 1. FC Köln | 2021–22 | Bundesliga | 8 | 0 | 1 | 0 | — | | — | | 9 | 0 |
| 1. FC Köln | Total | | 83 | 2 | 9 | 0 | 3 | 0 | 1 | 0 | 96 | 2 |
| Club América | 2021–22 | Liga MX | 10 | 0 | 0 | 0 | — | | — | | 10 | 0 |
| Mazatlán (loan) | 2022–23 | Liga MX | 6 | 0 | — | | — | | — | | 6 | 0 |
| Cádiz (loan) | 2022–23 | La Liga | 10 | 0 | — | | — | | — | | 10 | 0 |
| Career total | | | 217 | 5 | 11 | 0 | 3 | 0 | 1 | 0 | 232 | 5 |

== Honours ==
1. FC Köln

- 2. Bundesliga: 2018–19

Spain U19

- UEFA European Under-19 Championship: 2015

Spain U21

- UEFA European Under-21 Championship: 2019; runner-up 2017
