= Georg Teigl =

Austrian footballer (born 1991)

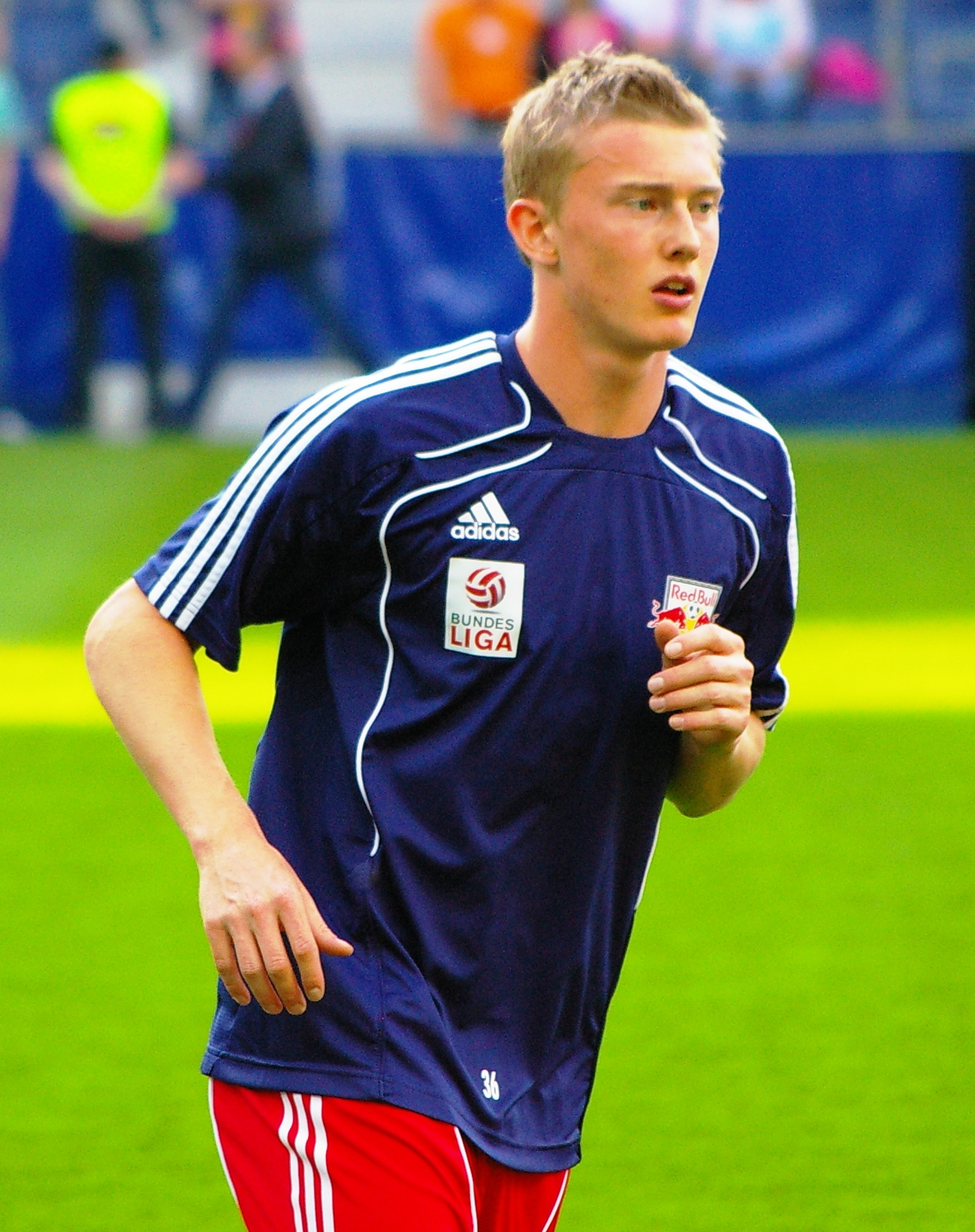

Personal information
- Date of birth: 9 February 1991 (age 35)
- Place of birth: Vienna, Austria
- Height: 1.83 m (6 ft 0 in)
- Position: Right-back

Team information
- Current team: SC Sommerein

Senior career*
Years	Team	Apps	(Gls)
2009–2011	USK Anif	32	(4)
2011–2014	Red Bull Salzburg	70	(7)
2014–2016	RB Leipzig	54	(3)
2015–2016	→ RB Leipzig II	3	(2)
2016–2020	FC Augsburg	27	(0)
2018	→ Eintracht Braunschweig (loan)	14	(0)
2020–2023	Austria Wien	62	(5)
2023–2024	Admira Wacker	21	(3)
2024–	SC Sommerein		

International career^{‡}
2009–2010	Austria U19	7	(0)
2011	Austria U20	2	(0)
2010–2013	Austria U21	8	(0)
- * Club domestic league appearances and goals as of 26 May 2024 ‡ National team caps and goals as of 15 January 2014

Georg Teigl (born 9 February 1991) is an Austrian professional footballer who plays as a right-back for an amateur side SC Sommerein.

== Career ==
=== Red Bull Salzburg ===
Teigl grew up playing in the St. Pölten youth system before joining Red Bull Salzburg in June 2009. On 16 April 2011, Teigl made his debut in the Austrian Bundesliga against Sturm Graz. Shortly afterwards, he signed a three-year deal with the club. Teigl scored his first Austrian Bundesliga goal against Austria Wien on 2 October 2011.

=== RB Leipzig ===
On 14 January 2014, it was announced that Teigl had transferred to RB Leipzig and signed a contract till summer 2015. He scored his first goal for RB Leipzig against Fortuna Düsseldorf on 28 September 2014.

=== Austria Wien ===
Teigl moved to Austria Wien for the 2020–21 season.

On 27 February 2022, toward the end of a match with Wolfsberger AC, Teigl's head collided with another player's knee, and he collapsed with a skull fracture and lost consciousness. The injury ended Teigl's 2021–22 season, but he returned in August.

=== Admira Wacker ===
On 17 July 2023, Teigl signed with Admira Wacker.

== Career statistics ==
As of match played 16 December 2017

Appearances and goals by club, season and competition
Club	Season	League			Cup		Europe		Total	
Club	Season	Division	Apps	Goals	Apps	Goals	Apps	Goals	Apps	Goals
USK Anif	2009–10	Austrian First League	12	0	0	0	—		12	0
USK Anif	2010–11	Austrian Regionalliga West	20	4	0	0	—		20	4
USK Anif	Total		32	4	0	0	0	0	32	4
Red Bull Salzburg	2010–11	Austrian Bundesliga	8	0	0	0	0	0	8	0
Red Bull Salzburg	2011–12	Austrian Bundesliga	23	2	2	1	6 (Note: Appearances in the Europa League)	0	31	3
Red Bull Salzburg	2012–13	Austrian Bundesliga	33	5	5	1	1 (Note: Appearance in the Champions League)	0	39	6
Red Bull Salzburg	2013–14	Austrian Bundesliga	6	0	1	0	2	0	9	0
Red Bull Salzburg	Total		70	7	8	2	9	0	87	9
RB Leipzig	2013–14	3. Liga	13	0	0	0	—		13	0
RB Leipzig	2014–15	2. Bundesliga	30	3	2	0	—		32	3
RB Leipzig	2015–16	2. Bundesliga	11	0	1	0	—		12	0
RB Leipzig	Total		54	3	3	0	0	0	57	3
RB Leipzig II	2015–16	Regionalliga Nordost	3	0	—		—		3	0
FC Augsburg	2016–17	Bundesliga	18	0	1	0	—		19	0
Eintracht Braunschweig (loan)	2017–18	2. Bundesliga	0	0	—		—		0	0
Career total			177	14	12	2	9	0	198	16

== Honours ==
Red Bull Salzburg

- Austrian Bundesliga: 2011–12
- Austrian Cup: 2011–12
