= Eros Dacaj =

German footballer (born 1996)

Personal information
- Date of birth: 9 September 1996 (age 30)
- Place of birth: Northeim, Germany
- Height: 1.80 m (5 ft 11 in)
- Position: Midfielder

Team information
- Current team: Sportfreunde Siegen
- Number: 21

Youth career
- –2012: JFV Northeim
- 2012–2015: Eintracht Braunschweig

Senior career*
Years	Team	Apps	(Gls)
2015–2018	Eintracht Braunschweig II	83	(17)
2017–2018	Eintracht Braunschweig	2	(0)
2018–2020	SV Rödinghausen	46	(6)
2020–2023	SV Elversberg	72	(10)
2023–2024	SV Rödinghausen	30	(5)
2024–2026	TSV Steinbach Haiger	60	(13)
2026–	Sportfreunde Siegen	8	(0)
- * Club domestic league appearances and goals as of 23 September 2026

Eros Dacaj (born 9 September 1996) is a German professional footballer who plays as a midfielder for Regionalliga West club Sportfreunde Siegen.

== Club career ==
Dacaj joined the youth academy of Eintracht Braunschweig in 2012 from JFV Northeim. In 2017, he was promoted to the club's senior side in the 2. Bundesliga. He made his professional debut on 18 August 2017, in a league match against FC Erzgebirge Aue. In summer 2018 he joined SV Rödinghausen.

In July 2023, Dacaj returned to SV Rödinghausen after three seasons away.

== International career ==
In August 2016, Dacaj was invited to a training camp of the Kosovo under-21 team.
