= Özkan Yıldırım =

German footballer

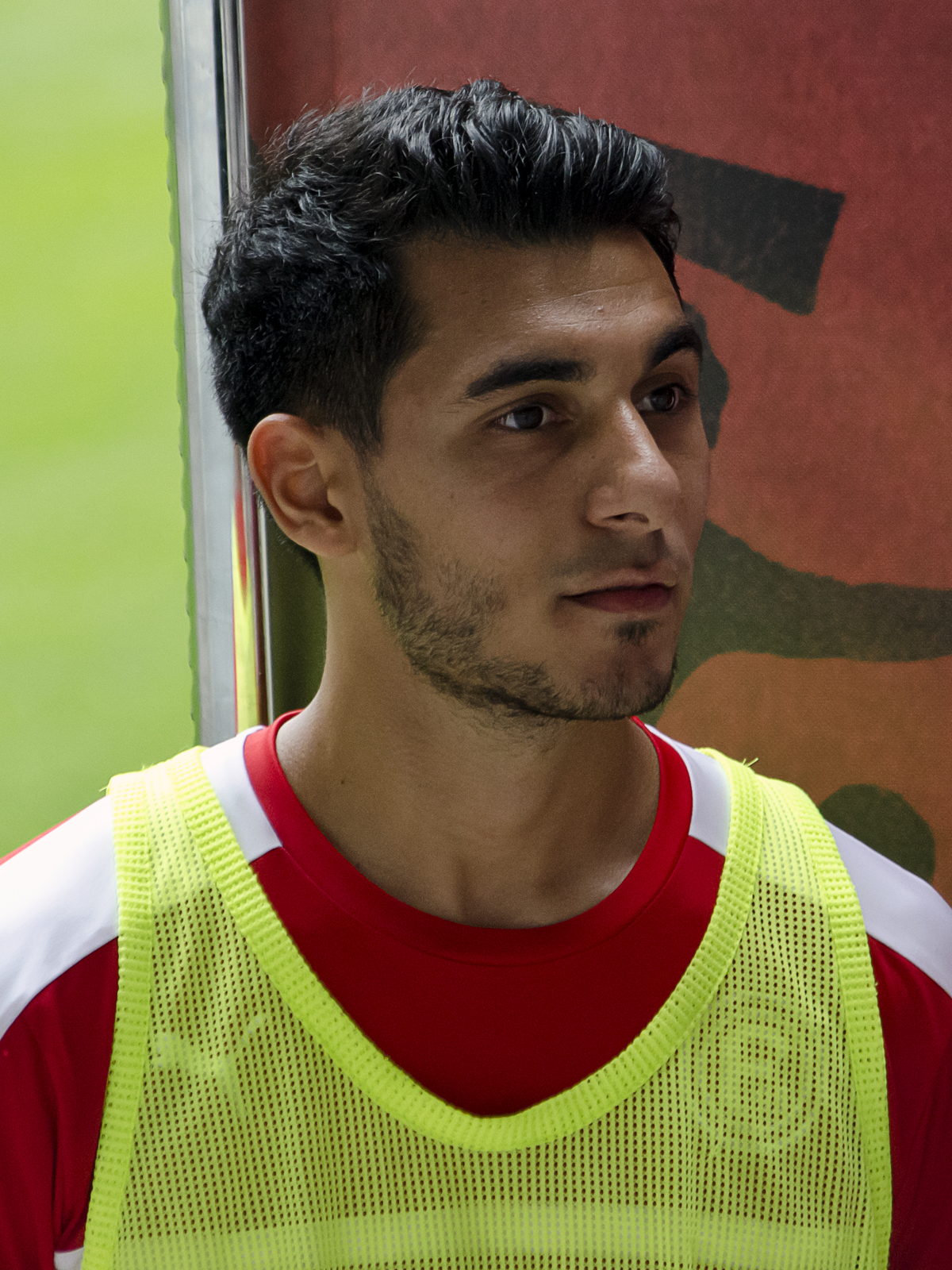
- Yildirim with Fortuna Düsseldorf in 2016

Personal information
- Date of birth: 10 April 1993 (age 33)
- Place of birth: Sulingen, Germany
- Height: 1.72 m (5 ft 8 in)
- Position: Attacking midfielder

Team information
- Current team: 68 Aksaray Belediyespor
- Number: 10

Youth career
- 1999–2002: TuS Sulingen
- 2003–2011: Werder Bremen

Senior career*
Years	Team	Apps	(Gls)
2011–2016	Werder Bremen II	20	(3)
2013–2016	Werder Bremen	20	(0)
2016–2017	Fortuna Düsseldorf	15	(1)
2017–2018	Eintracht Braunschweig	17	(1)
2020	Menemenspor	6	(1)
2021–2023	1461 Trabzon	62	(8)
2023–2024	Menemen	35	(7)
2024–2025	Adana 01 FK	20	(2)
2025–	68 Aksaray Belediyespor	26	(0)

International career
2008–2009	Germany U16	11	(3)
2009	Germany U17	4	(0)
2010–2011	Germany U18	8	(1)
2013	Germany U20	1	(0)
2013	Germany U21	4	(0)
- * Club domestic league appearances and goals as of 1 October 2026

Özkan Yıldırım (born 10 April 1993) is a German professional footballer who plays as an attacking midfielder for Turkish TFF 2. Lig club 68 Aksaray Belediyespor.

== Club career ==
On 14 May 2016, the last day of the 2015–16 Bundesliga season, Yıldırım made his first-team return from injury coming onto the pitch in the 77th minute of Werder Bremen's 1–0 win over Eintracht Frankfurt which kept Werder in the Bundesliga.

On 30 June 2016, Yıldırım signed a two-year contract with 2. Bundesliga side Fortuna Düsseldorf.

On 31 August 2017, he transferred to league rivals Eintracht Braunschweig having agreed a two-year contract until summer 2019. At the end of the season, following Braunschweig's relegation to the 3. Liga, he was released from his contract.

In September 2018, Yıldırım trialled with 2. Bundesliga SV Darmstadt 98. Three weeks later, in early October, Darmstadt announced their decision to not sign Yıldırım.

In January 2020, after being without a club for 1.5 years, Yıldırım joined Turkish second-tier side Menemenspor. He left the club at the end of his contract on 31 May 2020.
