= Eric Verstappen =

Dutch footballer (born 1994)

Personal information
- Full name: Eric Verstappen
- Date of birth: 19 May 1994 (age 32)
- Place of birth: Tegelen, Netherlands
- Height: 1.96 m (6 ft 5 in)
- Position: Goalkeeper

Team information
- Current team: Viktoria Aschaffenburg
- Number: 1

Youth career
- SC Irene
- –2009: VVV-Venlo
- 2009–2013: PSV

Senior career*
Years	Team	Apps	(Gls)
2013–2015	VVV-Venlo	0	(0)
2015–2017	De Graafschap	0	(0)
2016–2017	Jong De Graafschap	8	(0)
2017–2018	Eintracht Braunschweig II	3	(0)
2018–2019	Tennis Borussia Berlin	4	(0)
2019	Würzburger Kickers II	2	(0)
2019–2021	Würzburger Kickers	21	(0)
2021–2022	Vitesse	0	(0)
2023	Würzburger Kickers	9	(0)
2023–2025	Hoffenheim II	4	(0)
2025–	Viktoria Aschaffenburg	15	(0)

International career^{‡}
2008–2009	Netherlands U15	2	(0)
2009–2010	Netherlands U16	5	(0)
2010	Netherlands U17	3	(0)
- * Club domestic league appearances and goals as of 28 June 2026 ‡ National team caps and goals as of 14:36, 20 April 2019 (UTC)

Eric Verstappen (born 19 May 1994) is a Dutch footballer who plays as a goalkeeper for Regionalliga Bayern club Viktoria Aschaffenburg. He is not related to the family of Jos and Max Verstappen.

== Club career ==
=== De Graafschap ===
In 2015, Verstappen moved from VVV-Venlo to De Graafschap.

=== Eintracht Braunschweig II ===
In 2017, Verstappen moved to German club Eintracht Braunschweig II.

=== Tennis Borussia Berlin ===
In 2018, Verstappen moved to Tennis Borussia Berlin,

=== Würzburger Kickers II ===
After Tennis Borussia Berlin Verstappen joined third-division club Würzburger Kickers II in January 2019.

=== Würzburger Kickers ===
Verstappen got promoted to the first team and made his professional debut for Würzburg in the 3. Liga on 20 April 2019, starting in the away match against FSV Zwickau, which finished as a 0–2 loss.

=== Vitesse ===
In 2021, Verstappen transferred to Vitesse. Later that year Verstappen extended his contract for 1 year.

== International career ==
Verstappen began his youth international career with the Netherlands under-15 team, making two appearances for the team, with his debut coming on 9 December 2008 in a 1–0 win against Slovakia. He made his under-16 team debut on 27 October 2009 in a 0–0 draw against France. Overall, he made a total of five appearances for the under-16 team. He made his under-17 debut on 17 September 2010, appearing in a 0–0 draw against Italy. He was included in the Netherlands squad for the 2011 FIFA U-17 World Cup in Mexico. The team were eliminated in the group stage, with Verstappen not making an appearance in the tournament. Overall, he was capped three times for the under-17 team.
