= Steven Lewerenz =

German footballer

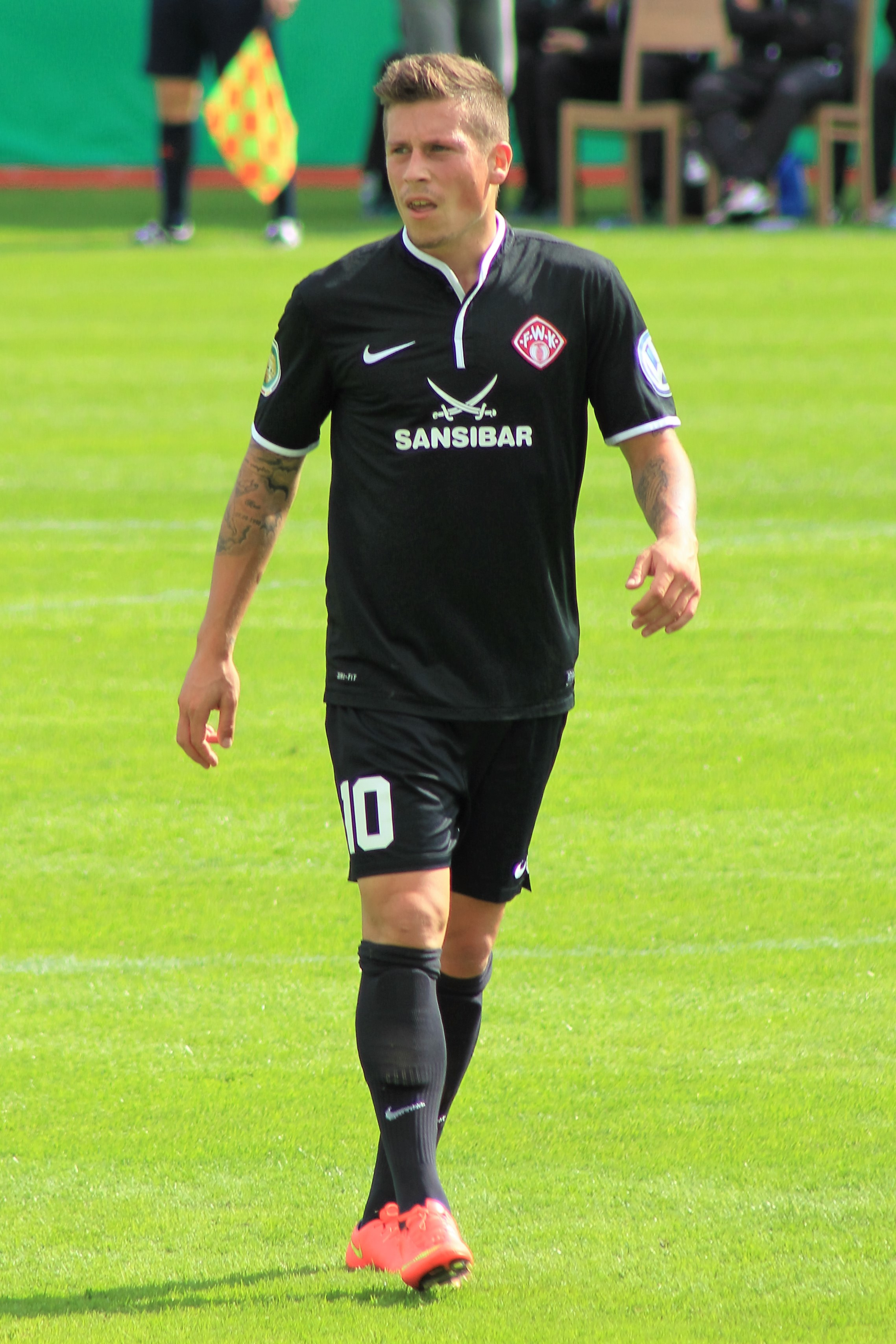
- Lewerenz in 2014

Personal information
- Date of birth: 18 May 1991 (age 35)
- Place of birth: Hamburg, Germany
- Height: 1.76 m (5 ft 9 in)
- Position: Left winger

Youth career
- –2007: VSG Stapelfeld
- 2007–2008: Dynamo Dresden
- 2008–2009: Hamburger SV

Senior career*
Years	Team	Apps	(Gls)
2009–2010	Hamburger SV II	28	(2)
2010–2012	RB Leipzig	11	(1)
2011	→ Kapfenberger SV (loan)	6	(0)
2012–2013	Eintracht Trier	28	(1)
2013–2014	Mainz 05 II	33	(7)
2014–2015	Würzburger Kickers	35	(7)
2015–2018	Holstein Kiel	101	(30)
2019	Magdeburg	7	(0)
2019	Virton	1	(0)
2019–2020	Virton B		
2020–2021	Viktoria Köln	14	(5)
2021	Rot-Weiss Essen	16	(3)
2021–2022	SG Sonnenhof Großaspach	24	(7)

International career
2009	Germany U-19	2	(0)
- * Club domestic league appearances and goals as of 20:14, 30 December 2022 (UTC)

Steven Lewerenz (born 18 May 1991) is a German professional footballer who most recently played as a left winger for SG Sonnenhof Großaspach.

== Career ==
In December 2018, after featuring sparingly in the first half of the 2018–19 season, Lewerenz agreed the termination of his contract with Holstein Kiel.

Days later, he joined league rivals 1. FC Magdeburg.

Ahead of the 2019–20 season, Lewerenz joined R.E. Virton in Belgium. In half a season with the club he made one 15-minute substitute appearance. In October 2019, he was relegated to the club's B-team.

In January 2020, he returned to Germany signing with FC Viktoria Köln. Lewerenz then moved to Rot-Weiss Essen on 1 February 2021, signing a deal for the rest of the season.

In March 2022 he agreed the termination of his contract with SG Sonnenhof Großaspach.
