= Steffen Nkansah =

German footballer (born 1996)

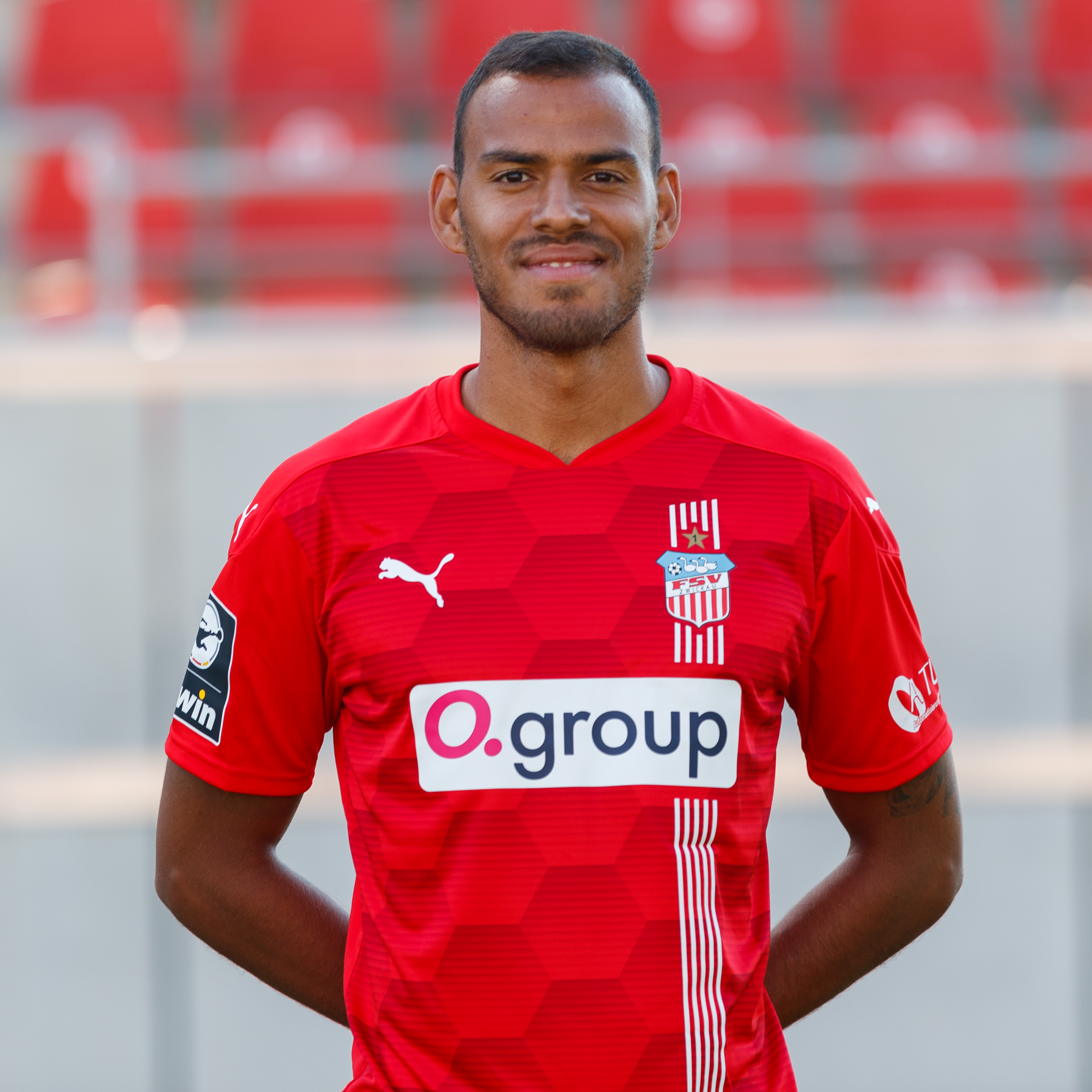
- Nkansah in 2021

Personal information
- Date of birth: 7 April 1996 (age 30)
- Place of birth: Münster, Germany
- Height: 1.88 m (6 ft 2 in)
- Position: Defender

Team information
- Current team: FC 08 Homburg
- Number: 5

Youth career
- –2009: FC Bavaria Wörth
- 2009–2014: 1899 Hoffenheim
- 2014–2015: Borussia Mönchengladbach

Senior career*
Years	Team	Apps	(Gls)
2015–2017	Borussia Mönchengladbach II	51	(0)
2017–2018	Eintracht Braunschweig II	6	(0)
2017–2020	Eintracht Braunschweig	60	(2)
2020–2022	FSV Zwickau	59	(4)
2022–2025	Erzgebirge Aue	53	(4)
2025–	FC 08 Homburg	10	(0)

International career^{‡}
2012	Germany U16	3	(0)
2012	Germany U17	3	(0)
2013–2014	Germany U18	9	(0)
2014	Germany U19	5	(0)
- * Club domestic league appearances and goals as of 26 June 2026 ‡ National team caps and goals as of 15:56, 17 July 2020 (UTC)

Steffen Nkansah (born 7 April 1996) is a German professional footballer who plays as a defender for Regionalliga Südwest club FC 08 Homburg.

== Career ==
Nkansah joined Eintracht Braunschweig in 2017 from Borussia Mönchengladbach II. He made his professional debut on 18 August 2017, in a 2. Bundesliga match against FC Erzgebirge Aue.

== Personal life ==
Nkansah was born in Münster to a German mother and a Ghanaian father.
