= Dominick Drexler =

German footballer (born 1990)

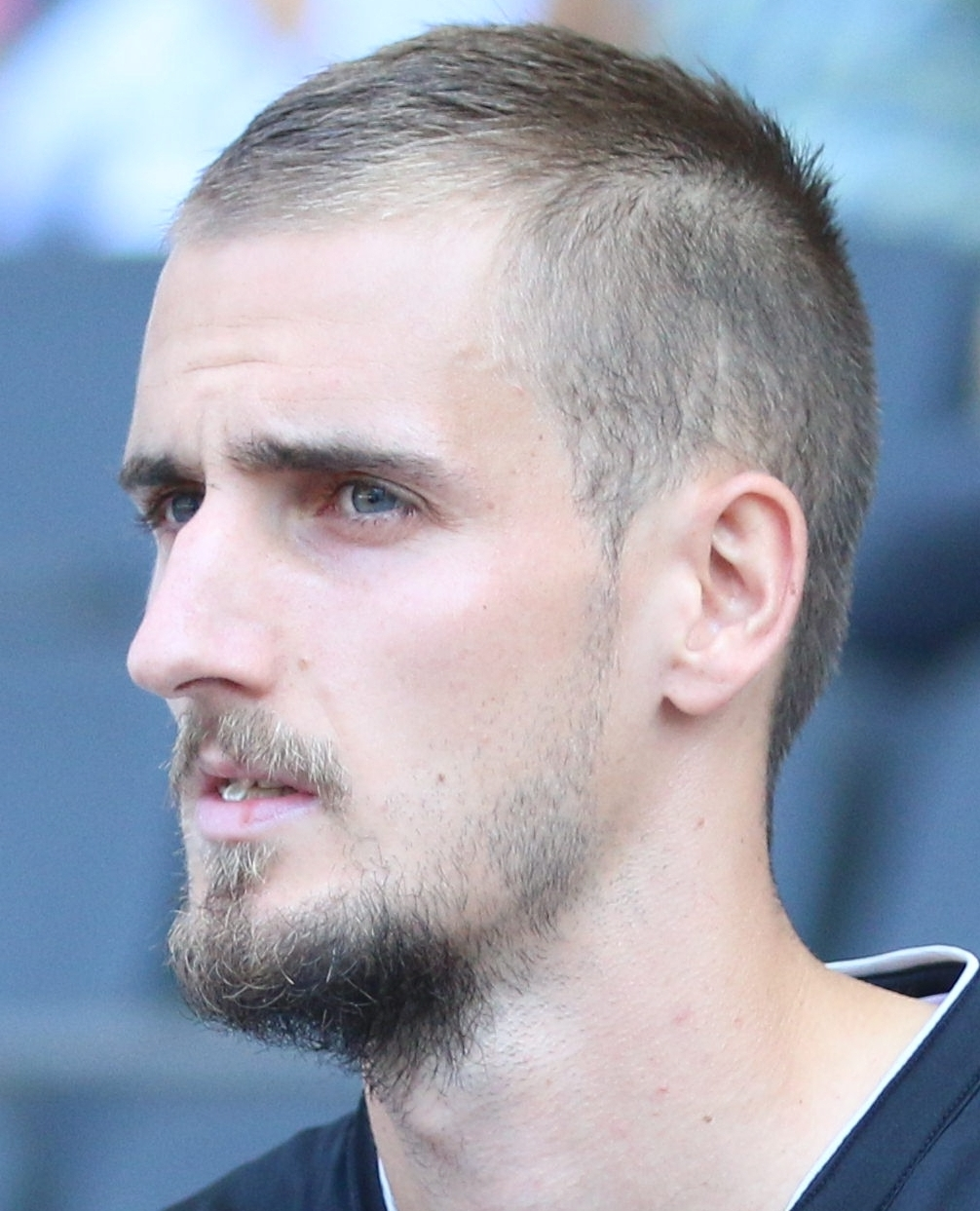
- Drexler in 2018

Personal information
- Date of birth: 26 May 1990 (age 36)
- Place of birth: Bonn, West Germany
- Height: 1.83 m (6 ft 0 in)
- Position: Attacking midfielder

Youth career
- 1995–2005: 1. SF Brüser Berg
- 2005–2006: Bonner SC
- 2006–2007: Alemannia Aachen
- 2007–2009: Bayer Leverkusen

Senior career*
Years	Team	Apps	(Gls)
2009–2010	Bayer Leverkusen II	25	(4)
2010–2013	Rot-Weiß Erfurt	81	(16)
2013–2014	Greuther Fürth	9	(1)
2013–2014	Greuther Fürth II	5	(4)
2014–2016	VfR Aalen	55	(10)
2016–2018	Holstein Kiel	66	(19)
2018	Midtjylland	0	(0)
2018–2021	1. FC Köln	87	(14)
2021–2025	Schalke 04	61	(8)
Total		389	(76)
- * Club domestic league appearances and goals

Dominick Drexler (born 26 May 1990) is a German former professional footballer who played as an attacking midfielder.

== Career ==
Drexler played as a teenager for Bonner SC, Alemannia Aachen, and Bayer Leverkusen before joining Rot-Weiß Erfurt in 2010. He made his debut for the club in September of that year, as a substitute for Tino Semmer in a Thuringia derby against Carl Zeiss Jena which Erfurt won 2–1. He finished the 2010–11 season with four goals in 19 appearances. He scored eight goals in 34 appearances in the 2011–12 season and four goals in 28 appearances in the 2012–13 season.

In July 2013, he signed for Greuther Fürth, where he spent the 2012–13 season, scoring a goal in 11 competitive matches. He also scored four goals in five matches for the reserve team. Then he joined VfR Aalen for the 2014–15 season. He scored one goal in 26 competitive appearances. In the following season, he scored nine goals in 32 competitive appearances. He then joined Holstein Kiel for the 2016–17 season. During that season, he scored seven goals in 35 appearances. During the 2017–18 season, he scored 14 goals in 34 appearances. This includes two goals in two appearances in the DFB Pokal and an appearance in the Promotion playoff.

Drexler signed with Midtjylland for the 2018–19 season. The transfer fee paid to Holstein Kiel was reported to be €2.5 million. However, during the same summer he was transferred again to 2. Bundesliga side 1. FC Köln for a reported fee of €4.5 million.

On 21 July 2021, he agreed to join Schalke 04, newly relegated from the Bundesliga, signing a two-year contract, which was extended by a further year due to Schalke's promotion in 2022. On 14 November 2023, the contract was extended until 30 June 2025. On 4 April 2025, Schalke 04 announced that he would retire from professional football at the end of the season and would become a youth assistant coach for the club.

== Career statistics ==
Appearances and goals by club, season and competition
Club	Season	League			Cup		Other		Total	
Club	Season	Division	Apps	Goals	Apps	Goals	Apps	Goals	Apps	Goals
Bayer Leverkusen II	2009–10	Regionalliga West	25	4	—		—		25	4
Rot-Weiß Erfurt	2010–11	3. Liga	19	4	—		—		19	4
Rot-Weiß Erfurt	2011–12	3. Liga	34	8	—		—		34	8
Rot-Weiß Erfurt	2012–13	3. Liga	28	4	—		—		28	4
Rot-Weiß Erfurt	Total		81	16	—		—		81	16
Greuther Fürth	2013–14	2. Bundesliga	9	1	2	0	—		11	1
Greuther Fürth II	2013–14	Regionalliga Bayern	5	4	—		—		5	4
VfR Aalen	2014–15	3. Liga	24	1	2	0	—		26	1
VfR Aalen	2015–16	3. Liga	31	9	1	0	—		32	9
VfR Aalen	Total		55	10	3	0	—		58	10
Holstein Kiel	2016–17	2. Bundesliga	35	7	—		—		35	7
Holstein Kiel	2017–18	2. Bundesliga	31	12	2	2	1 (Note: Appearances in Bundesliga relegation play-offs)	0	34	14
Holstein Kiel	Total		66	19	2	2	1	0	69	21
1. FC Köln	2018–19	2. Bundesliga	33	9	2	2	—		35	11
1. FC Köln	2019–20	Bundesliga	27	3	2	0	—		29	3
1. FC Köln	2020–21	Bundesliga	27	2	2	1	2	0	31	3
1. FC Köln	Total		87	14	6	3	2	0	95	17
Schalke 04	2021–22	2. Bundesliga	23	3	1	0	—		24	3
Schalke 04	2022–23	Bundesliga	27	4	2	3	—		29	7
Schalke 04	2023–24	2. Bundesliga	11	1	1	0	—		12	1
Schalke 04	2024–25	2. Bundesliga	0	0	0	0	—		0	0
Schalke 04	Total		61	8	4	3	—		65	11
Career total			389	76	17	8	3	0	409	84

== Honours ==
1. FC Köln

- 2. Bundesliga: 2018–19

Schalke 04

- 2. Bundesliga: 2021–22
