= Alexander Kunze =

German footballer

Personal information
- Full name: Alexander Kunze
- Date of birth: 12 January 1971 (age 55)
- Place of birth: Marienberg, Bezirk Karl-Marx-Stadt, East Germany
- Height: 1.93 m (6 ft 4 in)
- Position: Goalkeeper

Team information
- Current team: FC Ingolstadt 04 (goalkeeping coach)

Youth career
- 1977–1983: BSG Motor IFA Karl-Marx-Stadt
- 1983–1989: FC Karl-Marx-Stadt

Senior career*
Years	Team	Apps	(Gls)
1989	BSG Aufbau dkk Krumhermersdorf		
1990–1992	TSV IFA Chemnitz		
1992–1996	Chemnitzer FC	22	(0)
1996–2000	VFC Plauen		
2000–2002	SV Babelsberg 03	66	(0)
2002–2007	Eintracht Braunschweig	31	(0)

Managerial career
- 2003–2005: Eintracht Braunschweig (youth goalkeeping coach)
- 2009–2018: Eintracht Braunschweig (goalkeeping coach)
- 2019–: FC Ingolstadt 04 (goalkeeping coach)
- * Club domestic league appearances and goals

Alexander Kunze (born 12 January 1971 in Marienberg, East Germany) is a retired German footballer, and the current goalkeeping coach of FC Ingolstadt 04. As a player, he spent six seasons in the 2. Bundesliga with Braunschweig, SV Babelsberg 03, and Chemnitzer FC.
