= Louis Samson =

German footballer

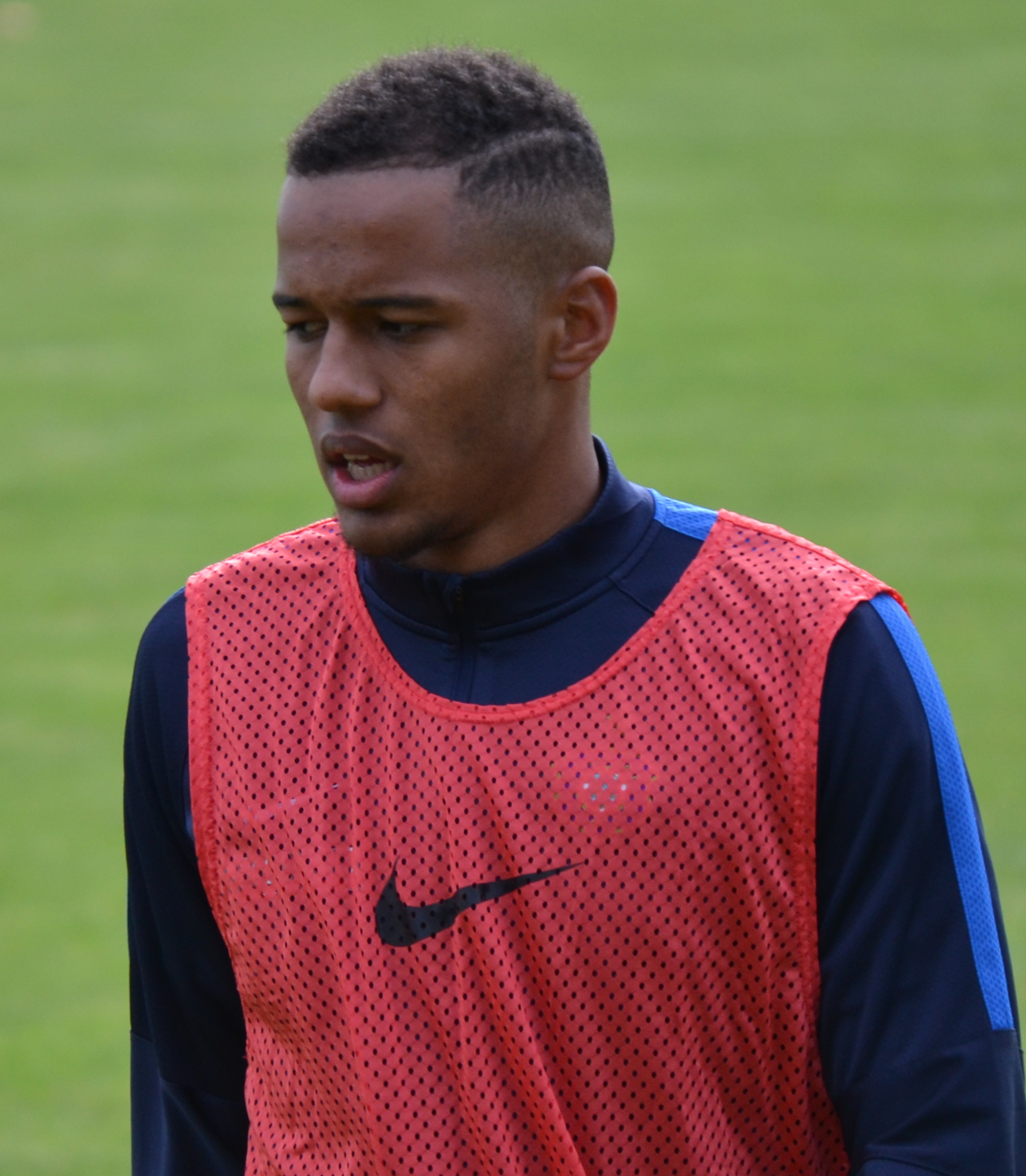
- Samson in 2016

Personal information
- Date of birth: 3 July 1995 (age 31)
- Place of birth: Berlin, Germany
- Height: 1.89 m (6 ft 2 in)
- Position: Midfielder

Team information
- Current team: RSV Eintracht 1949
- Number: 5

Youth career
- –2011: Tennis Borussia Berlin
- 2011–2014: Hertha BSC

Senior career*
Years	Team	Apps	(Gls)
2013–2015	Hertha BSC II	41	(2)
2015–2017	Erzgebirge Aue	60	(1)
2017–2018	Eintracht Braunschweig	19	(0)
2019–2021	Erzgebirge Aue	50	(0)
2021–2023	Hallescher FC	34	(0)
2023–2024	TuS Makkabi Berlin	20	(0)
2024–	RSV Eintracht 1949	0	(0)
- * Club domestic league appearances and goals as of 8 June 2024

Louis Samson (born 3 July 1995) is a German professional footballer who plays as a midfielder for NOFV-Oberliga Süd club RSV Eintracht 1949.

== Career ==
Samson joined Erzgebirge Aue from Hertha BSC II in June 2015. On 1 June 2017, Eintracht Braunschweig announced the signing of Samson on a two-year contract.

Following his release by Erzgebirge Aue at the end of the 2020–21 season, Samson moved to Hallescher FC.

== Personal life ==
He is of Nigerian descent through his father.
