= Jasmin Fejzić =

Bosnian footballer (born 1986)

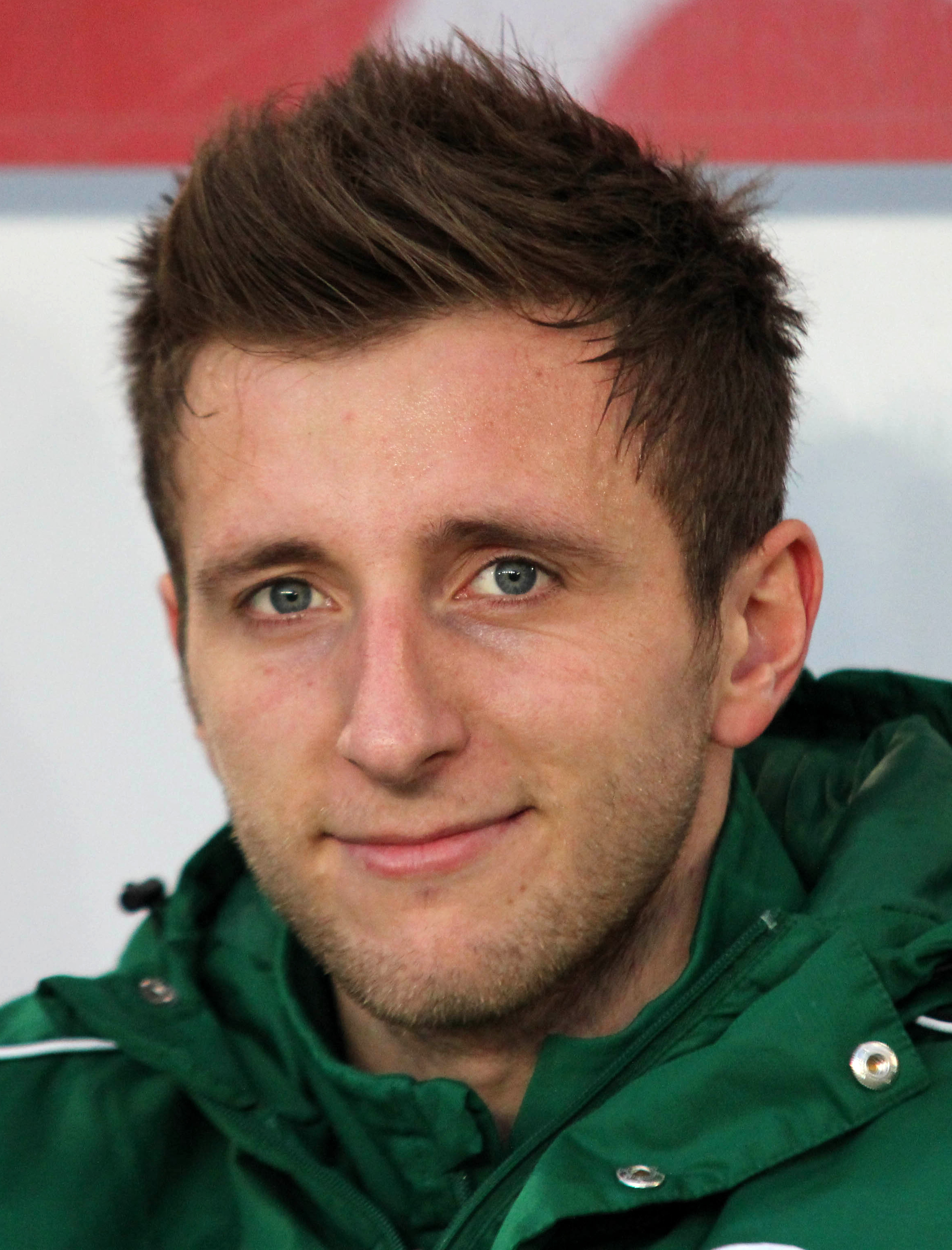
- Fejzić with Greuther Fürth in 2012

Personal information
- Full name: Jasmin Fejzić
- Date of birth: 15 May 1986 (age 40)
- Place of birth: Živinice, SFR Yugoslavia
- Height: 1.98 m (6 ft 6 in)
- Position: Goalkeeper

Youth career
- 1996–2001: TSV Eltingen
- 2001–2004: Stuttgarter Kickers

Senior career*
Years	Team	Apps	(Gls)
2003–2005	Stuttgarter Kickers II	12	(0)
2004–2005	Stuttgarter Kickers	2	(0)
2005–2012	Greuther Fürth II	66	(0)
2007–2012	Greuther Fürth	2	(0)
2007–2009	→ Eintracht Braunschweig (loan)	41	(0)
2012–2015	VfR Aalen	62	(0)
2015–2016	Eintracht Braunschweig II	1	(0)
2015–2018	Eintracht Braunschweig	69	(0)
2018–2019	1. FC Magdeburg	4	(0)
2019–2023	Eintracht Braunschweig	130	(0)
Total		389	(0)

International career
2014	Bosnia and Herzegovina	1	(0)
- * Club domestic league appearances and goals

Jasmin Fejzić (born 15 May 1986) is a Bosnian former professional footballer who played as a goalkeeper.

== Club career ==
Fejzić began his career with TSV Eltingen and moved to Stuttgarter Kickers in 2001. In July 2004 he was promoted to the reserve team. About a year later, on 23 June 2005, he joined Greuther Fürth. Fejzić played 34 games for the club's reserve team in the Oberliga Bayern and was then loaned out to Eintracht Braunschweig on 23 May 2007. After 41 games with Eintracht Braunschweig he returned to Greuther Fürth.

For the 2015–16 2. Bundesliga season, Fejzić returned to Eintracht Braunschweig, signing a two-year contract.

== International career ==
Fejzić was called up to national team by manager Safet Sušić during qualifiers for 2014 FIFA World Cup and for the tournament itself, but hasn't seen any playing time. He earned his first and only cap for the side as a 62nd minute sub on 4 September 2014 during a friendly against Liechtenstein, having waited over 12 months for his chance since being first time called up for game versus Greece in March 2013.
