= Tim Kister =

German footballer

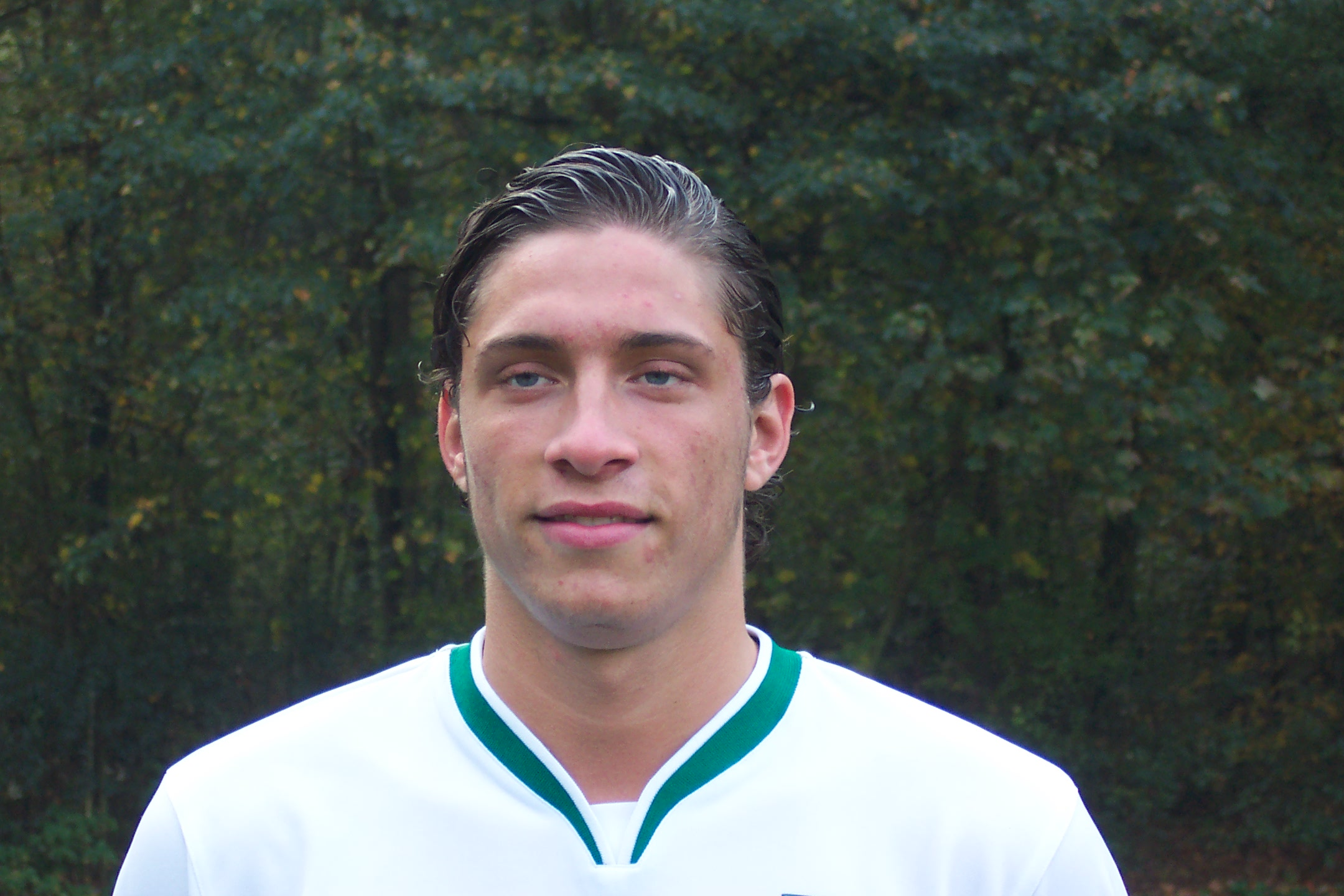
- Kister in 2006

Personal information
- Date of birth: 30 December 1986 (age 39)
- Place of birth: Frankfurt, West Germany
- Height: 1.93 m (6 ft 4 in)
- Position: Centre-back

Youth career
- –2007: SpVgg Oberrad 05

Senior career*
| Years | Team | Apps | (Gls) |
| 2007–2010 | Rot-Weiß Frankfurt | 80 | (15) |
| 2010–2011 | Dynamo Dresden | 21 | (1) |
| 2011–2013 | VfR Aalen | 62 | (6) |
| 2013–2022 | SV Sandhausen | 167 | (3) |
- * Club domestic league appearances and goals

Tim Kister (born 30 December 1986) is a German former professional footballer who played as a centre-back.

== Career ==
Kister played with various amateur clubs in his hometown of Frankfurt, before joining Dynamo Dresden in 2010. He made his 3. Liga debut in the first match of the 2010–11 season, coming as a substitute for Jonas Strifler, and made another 20 appearances as the club finished third and were promoted to the 2. Bundesliga. He was released by the club at the end of the season, promptly signing for VfR Aalen, with whom he earned a second consecutive promotion to the second tier. After two years with Aalen, he signed for SV Sandhausen.

Kister retired from playing at the end of the 2021–22 season after 9 seasons with Sandhausen.
