= Rafael Czichos =

German footballer (born 1990)

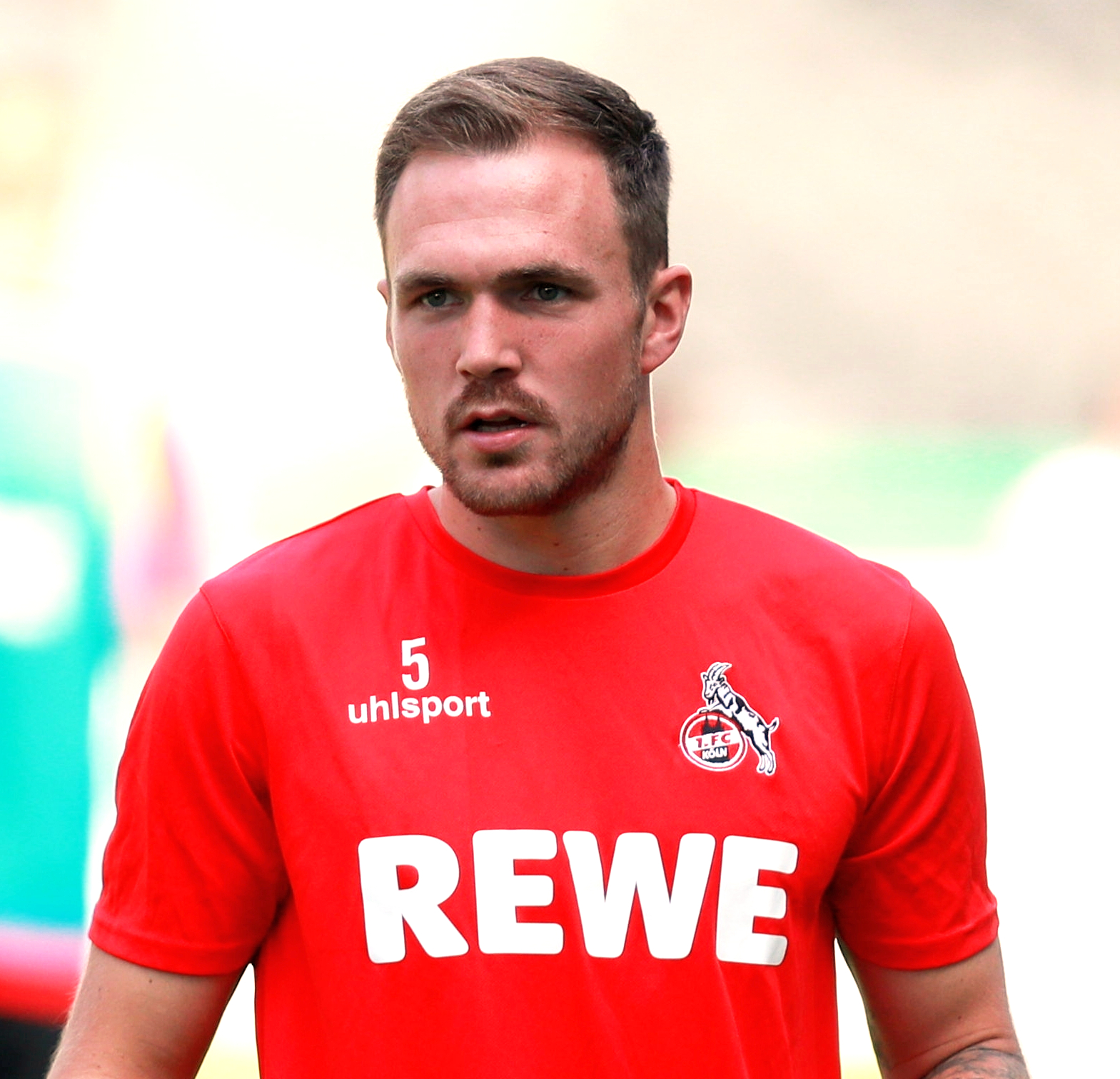
- Czichos with 1. FC Köln in 2018

Personal information
- Date of birth: 14 May 1990 (age 36)
- Place of birth: Jeddah, Saudi Arabia
- Height: 1.87 m (6 ft 2 in)
- Position: Centre-back

Team information
- Current team: Phoenix Rising

Youth career
- FSV Verden 04
- –2008: TSV Ottersberg

Senior career*
Years	Team	Apps	(Gls)
2008–2010	TSV Ottersberg	62	(15)
2010–2012	VfL Wolfsburg II	23	(1)
2012–2015	Rot-Weiss Erfurt	99	(9)
2015–2018	Holstein Kiel	99	(12)
2018–2022	1. FC Köln	103	(4)
2022–2024	Chicago Fire	86	(6)
2025–	Phoenix Rising	17	(1)
- * Club domestic league appearances and goals as of 18:46, 10 November 2026 (UTC)

Rafael Czichos (born 14 May 1990) is a German professional footballer who plays as a centre-back for USL Championship club Phoenix Rising.

== Career ==
Born in Jeddah, Saudi Arabia while his father worked there, Czichos began his career at TSV Ottersberg and joined VfL Wolfsburg II in 2010. In 2012, he signed with then 3. Liga side Rot-Weiss Erfurt. After signing with Holstein Kiel, Czichos first played in the 2. Bundesliga when the team won promotion in 2017.

However, Kiel failed to win promotion after the 2017–18 season and he was sold to newly relegated side 1. FC Köln for a fee of €1.8 million. He made his debut, including his first goal, for the club in a 2–0 victory against VfL Bochum on 4 August 2018. Having been an undisputed starter in the first half of the 2021–22 season, he left 1. FC Köln in January 2022, with half a year left on his contract. kicker described the move as "surprising".

On 2 January 2022, Czichos transferred to Major League Soccer club Chicago Fire on a three-year contract. Czichos was released by Chicago following their 2024 season.

On 28 August 2025, Czichos signed with USL Championship side Phoenix Rising on a contract that would keep him at the club through 2026.

== Personal life ==
In a July 2018 interview Czichos revealed he was a life-long fan of Werder Bremen.
