= 2017–18 1. FC Kaiserslautern season =

1. FC Kaiserslautern
2017–18 season
- Manager: Jeff Strasser
- Stadium: Fritz-Walter-Stadion
- 2. Bundesliga: 18th (relegated)
- DFB-Pokal: Second round
Home colours	Away colours	Third colours
- All statistics correct as of 28 January 2018.

The 2017–18 1. FC Kaiserslautern season was the 118th season in the football club's history. The season covered a period from 1 July 2017 to 30 June 2018.

== Players ==
=== Squad information ===
As of 2 February 2018

Note: Flags indicate national team as defined under FIFA eligibility rules; some limited exceptions apply. Players may hold more than one non-FIFA nationality.

No.	Pos.	Nation	Player
2	DF	ARG	Giuliano Modica
3	DF	GER	Joel Abu Hanna
4	DF	GER	Patrick Ziegler
5	DF	GER	Benjamin Kessel
6	DF	GER	Leon Guwara (on loan from Werder Bremen)
7	FW	AUS	Brandon Borrello
8	MF	GER	Gino Fechner
9	FW	SWE	Sebastian Andersson
10	MF	TUR	Halil Altıntop
11	MF	NOR	Ruben Yttergård Jenssen (on loan from FC Groningen)
14	MF	DEN	Mads Albæk
15	MF	CIV	Dylan Esmel
18	MF	GER	Christoph Moritz
19	DF	GER	Marcel Correia
20	FW	POL	Kacper Przybylko
21	DF	AUT	Phillipp Mwene

No.	Pos.	Nation	Player
22	FW	NED	Gervane Kastaneer
23	DF	GER	Jan-Ingwer Callsen-Bracker (on loan from FC Augsburg)
24	GK	GER	Marius Müller (on loan from RB Leipzig)
26	FW	ALB	Valdrin Mustafa
27	DF	GER	Patrick Salata
28	MF	GER	Daniel Halfar (captain)
29	DF	AUT	Stipe Vučur
30	GK	GER	Lennart Grill
32	GK	GER	Jan-Ole Sievers
33	FW	LTU	Lukas Spalvis
35	FW	NGR	Osayamen Osawe
36	MF	GHA	Manfred Osei Kwadwo
37	FW	GER	Nicklas Shipnoski
38	MF	GER	Nils Seufert
39	MF	GER	David Tomić
40	FW	GER	Torben Müsel

== Friendly matches ==
Win Draw Loss

30 June 2017	Wormatia Worms	0–5	1. FC Kaiserslautern
18:30		Summary

4 July 2017	VfR Kaiserslautern	0–8	1. FC Kaiserslautern
18:30		Summary

12 July 2017	FC Augsburg	2–0	1. FC Kaiserslautern	Mals
18:00		Summary		Stadium: Stadio Malles Venosta

18 July 2017	FK Pirmasens	1–7	1. FC Kaiserslautern
18:30		Summary

22 July 2017	1. FC Kaiserslautern	0–2	Derby County
16:00		Summary

31 August 2017	1914 Oppau	0–8	1. FC Kaiserslautern
18:00		Summary

17 January 2018	1. FC Kaiserslautern	1–0	FC Midtjylland	Kaiserslautern
18:30		Summary		Stadium: Fritz-Walter-Stadion

== Competitions ==
Win Draw Loss

=== 2. Bundesliga ===
==== League table ====
Pos	Team	Pld	W	D	L	GF	GA	GD	Pts	Promotion, qualification or relegation
14	Dynamo Dresden	34	11	8	15	42	52	−10	41	
15	Greuther Fürth	34	10	10	14	37	48	−11	40	
16	Erzgebirge Aue (O)	34	10	10	14	35	49	−14	40	Qualification for relegation play-offs
17	Eintracht Braunschweig (R)	34	8	15	11	37	43	−6	39	Relegation to 3. Liga
18	1. FC Kaiserslautern (R)	34	9	8	17	42	55	−13	35	Relegation to 3. Liga

Source: DFB
Rules for classification: 1) Points; 2) Goal difference; 3) Goals scored
(O) Play-off winners; (R) Relegated

==== Results summary ====
Overall								Home						Away					
Pld	W	D	L	GF	GA	GD	Pts	W	D	L	GF	GA	GD	W	D	L	GF	GA	GD
34	9	8	17	39	54	−15	35	4	7	6	18	20	−2	5	1	11	21	34	−13

Last updated: 6 May 2018.

==== Results by round ====
Matchday	1	2	3	4	5	6	7	8	9	10	11	12	13	14	15	16	17	18	19	20	21	22	23	24	25	26	27	28	29	30	31	32	33	34
Ground	A	H	A	H	A	A	H	A	H	A	H	A	H	A	H	A	H	H	A	H	A	H	H	A	H	A	H	A	H	A	H	A	H	A
Result	L	D	L	D	L	L	L	L	W	D	L	L	D	W	L	L	D	D	W	L	W	W	L	L	W	L	D	W	D	L	L	L	W	W
Position	18	14	16	17	17	18	18	18	17	18	18	18	18	18	18	18	18	18	18	18	18	18	18	18	18	18	18	18	18	18	18	18	18	18

Updated to match(es) played on 6 May 2018. Source: https://www.kicker.de/2-bundesliga/tabelle/2017-18
A = Away; H = Home; W = Win; D = Draw; L = Loss

==== Matches ====
30 July 2017 1	1. FC Nürnberg	3–0	1. FC Kaiserslautern	Nuremberg
13:30	Behrens 13'; Möhwald 54'; Müller 25' (o.g.)	Report	Moritz (yellow card) 51'; Spalvis (yellow card) 55'; Fechner (yellow card) 62'	Stadium: Max-Morlock-Stadion; Attendance: 30,569; Referee: (Germany) Markus Schmidt (referee)

4 August 2017 2	1. FC Kaiserslautern	1–1	Darmstadt 98	Kaiserslautern
20:30	Halfar (yellow card) 4' (goal) 39'; Osawe (yellow card) 21'; Mwuene (yellow card) 90+3'	Report	Höhn (yellow card) 31'; Kamavuaka 72'	Stadium: Fritz-Walter-Stadion; Attendance: 30,786; Referee: (Germany) Robert Hartmann (referee)

19 August 2017 3	Fortuna Düsseldorf	2–0	1. FC Kaiserslautern	Düsseldorf
13:00	Neuhaus (yellow card) 17' (goal) 76'; Sobottka (yellow card) 27'; Bebou 43'; Hoffmann (yellow card) 90+1'	Report	Vučur (yellow card) 37'; Fechner (yellow card) 71'; Kastaneer (yellow card) 72'	Stadium: Esprit Arena; Attendance: 25,227; Referee: (Germany) Bastian Dankert

28 August 2017 4	1. FC Kaiserslautern	1–1	Eintracht Braunschweig	Kaiserslautern
20:30	Kessel (yellow card) 11'; Albæk (yellow card) 35'; Reichel 80' (o.g.); Marcel Correia (yellow card) 90+2'	Report	Hernández 27'; Samson (yellow card) 56'; Zuck (yellow card) 71'; Reichel (yellow card) 84'; Fejzić (yellow card) 85'	Stadium: Fritz-Walter-Stadion; Attendance: 20,100; Referee: (Germany) Robert Kampka

9 September 2017 5	Holstein Kiel	2–1	1. FC Kaiserslautern	Kiel
13:00	Schindler (yellow card) 31'; Lewerenz 44'; Schmidt (yellow card) 60'; Weilandt (yellow card) 69'; Vučur 90+3' (o.g.)	Report	Marcel Correia (yellow card) 29'; Andersson 62'; Ziegler (yellow card) 68'	Stadium: Holstein-Stadion; Attendance: 10,318; Referee: (Germany) Alexander Sather

16 September 2017 6	Sandhausen	1–0	1. FC Kaiserslautern	Sandhausen
13:00	Höler 68'; Stiefler (yellow card) 83'; Jansen (yellow card) 90+5'	Report	Kessel (yellow card) 78'; Spalvis (yellow card) 90+1'	Stadium: BWT-Stadion am Hardtwald; Attendance: 8,103; Referee: (Germany) Rene Rohde

19 September 2017 7	1. FC Kaiserslautern	0–2	Erzgebirge Aue	Kaiserslautern
18:30	Guwara (yellow card) 40'; Spalvis (yellow card) 85'	Report	Bertram 30' 48'; Kalig (yellow card) 44'; Fandrich (yellow card) 56'	Stadium: Fritz-Walter-Stadion; Attendance: 16,613; Referee: (Germany) Martin Thomsen

25 September 2017 8	Union Berlin	5–0	1. FC Kaiserslautern	Berlin
20:30	Polter 6' 25' 77'; Modica 11' (o.g.); Kroos (yellow card) 16'; Skrzybski 32'; Trimmel (yellow card) 74'	Report	Moritz (yellow card) 18'; Andersson (yellow card) 27'; Guwara (yellow card) 35'; Mwene (yellow card) 87'	Stadium: Stadion An der Alten Försterei; Attendance: 20,592; Referee: (Germany) Markus Schmidt (referee)

29 September 2017 9	1. FC Kaiserslautern	3–0	Greuther Fürth	Kaiserslautern
18:30	Andersson 71', 74', 80'	Report	Maloča (yellow card) 20'; Narey (yellow card) 68'; Wittek (yellow card) 81'	Stadium: Fritz-Walter-Stadion; Attendance: 19,179; Referee: (Germany) Sören Storks

13 October 2017 10	FC St Pauli	1–1	1. FC Kaiserslautern	Hamburg
18:30	Allagui 63'	Report	Kessel (yellow card) 52'; Andersson 77'	Stadium: Millerntor-Stadion; Attendance: 29,546; Referee: (Germany) Sascha Stegemann

22 October 2017 11	1. FC Kaiserslautern	0–1	MSV Duisburg	Kaiserslautern
13:30	Müller (yellow card) 37'; Atik (yellow card) 89'; Mwene (yellow card) 90+1'	Report	Fröde (yellow card) 39'; Bomheuer 67'; Stoppelkamp (yellow card) 77'; Albutat (yellow card) 89'; Hajri (yellow card) 90+2'	Stadium: Fritz-Walter-Stadion; Attendance: 22,833; Referee: (Germany) Florian Heft

28 October 2017 12	Jahn Regensburg	3–1	1. FC Kaiserslautern	Regensburg
13:00	Stolze 10' 49'; Knoll 33'; Geipl (yellow card) 53'; Adamyan (yellow card) 74'	Report	Moritz 14' (pen.)	Stadium: Continental Arena; Attendance: 10,081; Referee: (Germany) Aarne Aarnink

3 November 2017 13	1. FC Kaiserslautern	0–0	Bochum	Kaiserslautern
18:30	Seufert (yellow card) 33'; Borrello (yellow card) 74'; Moritz (yellow card) 90'	Report	Celozzi (yellow card) 75'; Diamantakos (yellow card) 80'; Losilla (yellow card) 90'	Stadium: Fritz-Walter-Stadion; Attendance: 19,086; Referee: (Germany) Alexander Sather

20 November 2017 14	Dynamo Dresden	1–2	1. FC Kaiserslautern	Dresden
20:30	Röser 14'; Hartmann (yellow card) 84'	Report	Kessel (yellow card) 41'; Vučur 85'; Spalvis 88'	Stadium: DDV-Stadion; Attendance: 27,224; Referee: (Germany) Tobias Reichel

26 November 2017 15	1. FC Kaiserslautern	0–2	Arminia Bielefeld	Kaiserslautern
13:30	Borrello (yellow card) 56'; Halfar (yellow card) 81'	Report	Voglsammer 27'; Kerschbaumer (yellow card) 87' (goal) 90+5'	Stadium: Fritz-Walter-Stadion; Attendance: 20,464; Referee: (Germany) Florian Badstübner

1 December 2017 16	1. FC Heidenheim	3–2	1. FC Kaiserslautern	Heidenheim an der Brenz
18:30	Wittek (yellow card) 39' (goal) 56'; Schnatterer 68' (pen.) 90+1'; Theuerkauf (yellow card) 85'	Report	Abu Hanna (yellow card) 10'; Seufert (yellow card) 35'; Spalvis 57' (red card) 66'; Feick 80' (o.g.); Shipnoski (yellow card) 90'	Stadium: Voith-Arena; Attendance: 11,700; Referee: (Germany) Rene Rohde

10 December 2017 17	1. FC Kaiserslautern	1–1	FC Ingolstadt 04	Kaiserslautern
13:30	Andersson 7'; Kessel (yellow card) 11' (yellow-red card); Borrello (yellow card) 23'; Müller (yellow card) 68'	Report	Levels (yellow card) 73'; Träsch (yellow card) 78'; Lezcano 79'	Stadium: Fritz-Walter-Stadion; Attendance: 16,074; Referee: (Germany) Matthias Jöllenbeck

16 December 2017 18	1. FC Kaiserslautern	1–1	1. FC Nürnberg	Kaiserslautern
13:00	Mwene (yellow card) 55'; Bredlow 61' (o.g.); Fechner (yellow card) 79'	Report	Ishak 24'; Löwen (yellow card) 90+3'	Stadium: Fritz-Walter-Stadion; Attendance: 19,790; Referee: (Germany) Christof Günsch

24 January 2018 19	Darmstadt 98	A–A	1. FC Kaiserslautern	Darmstadt
18:30 CET	Jones (yellow card) 20'; Medojevic (yellow card) 40'	Report	Jenssen (yellow card) 14'; Moritz (yellow card) 29'	Stadium: Merck-Stadion am Böllenfalltor; Attendance: 17,400; Referee: Bastian Dankert
Note: Match abandoned at half-time following a medical emergency.

27 January 2018 20	1. FC Kaiserslautern	1–3	Fortuna Düsseldorf	Kaiserslautern
13:00	Borrello (yellow card) 5'; Moritz 48' (pen.); Müller (yellow card) 51' (yellow-red card); Callsen-Bracker (yellow card) 74'	Report	Haraguchi (yellow card) 13' (goal) 64' (pen.); Raman 78'; Schmitz 89'	Stadium: Fritz-Walter-Stadion; Attendance: 21,739; Referee: (Germany) Tobias Stieler

4 February 2018 21	Eintracht Braunschweig	1–2	1. FC Kaiserslautern	Braunschweig
13:30	Nkansah (yellow card) 32'; Teigl (yellow card) 34'; Abdullahi 72'	Report	Spalvis 4' 35'; Seufert (yellow card) 37'; Jenssen (yellow card) 42'	Stadium: Eintracht-Stadion; Attendance: 20,550; Referee: (Germany) Alexander Sather

9 February 2018 22	1. FC Kaiserslautern	3–1	Holstein Kiel	Kaiserslautern
18:30	Borrello 2'; Moritz 45' (pen.) (yellow card) 81'; Osawe 51'	Report	Hermann (yellow card) 5'; Kinsombi (yellow card) 24' (goal) 32' van den Bergh (yellow card) 84'	Stadium: Fritz-Walter-Stadion; Attendance: 20,664; Referee: (Germany) Guido Winkmann

16 February 2018 23	1. FC Kaiserslautern	0–1	Sandhausen	Kaiserslautern
18:30		Report	Förster 78'; Paqarada (yellow card) 90'	Stadium: Fritz-Walter-Stadion; Attendance: 23,811; Referee: (Germany) Manuel Gräfe

21 February 2018 19	Darmstadt 98	1–2	1. FC Kaiserslautern	Darmstadt
18:30	Kempe (yellow card) 43'; Platte 90+1'; Medojević (yellow card) 90+6'; Jones (yellow card) 90+6'	Report	Borrello 16'; Mwene (yellow card) 56' (goal) 61'; Moritz (yellow card) 90+6'	Stadium: Merck-Stadion am Böllenfalltor; Attendance: 17,400; Referee: (Germany) Bibiana Steinhaus

24 February 2018 24	Erzgebirge Aue	2–1	1. FC Kaiserslautern	Aue
13:00	Köpke 2'; Munsy 63'; Nazarov (yellow card) 66'; Rizzuto (yellow card) 75'	Report	Vučur 67'; Ziegler (yellow card) 89'	Stadium: Erzgebirgsstadion; Attendance: 8,500; Referee: Christian Dietz

2 March 2018 25	1. FC Kaiserslautern	4–3	Union Berlin	Kaiserslautern
18:30	Borrello 6'; Andersson 41'; Guwara (yellow card) 59'; Moritz 66' (pen.); Mwene (yellow card) 84' (goal) 86'; Kessel (yellow card) 90+5'	Report	Andersson 36' (o.g.); Skrzybski 51', 81'	Stadium: Fritz-Walter-Stadion; Attendance: 20,087; Referee: Sven Waschitzki

10 March 2018 26	Greuther Fürth	2–1	1. FC Kaiserslautern	Fürth
13:00	Green 17'; Wittek (yellow card) 63'; Maloča (yellow card) 70'; Steiniger 74'	Report	Osawe 45'; Guwara (yellow card) 72'; Vučur (yellow card) 79'	Stadium: Sportpark Ronhof Thomas Sommer; Attendance: 11,460; Referee: Florian Heft

17 March 2018 27	1. FC Kaiserslautern	1–1	St. Pauli	Kaiserslautern
13:00	Callsen-Bracker (red card) 71'; Spalvis 84'	Report	Şahin (yellow card) 17'; Bouhaddouz 73' (pen.); Park (yellow card) 76'; Allagui (yellow card) 87'	Stadium: Fritz-Walter-Stadion; Attendance: 32,243; Referee: Frank Willenborg

31 March 2018 28	MSV Duisburg	1–4	1. FC Kaiserslautern	Duisburg
13:00	Hajri (yellow card) 43'; Wolze (yellow card) 64'Iljutcenko 70'	Report	Osawe 12', 48', 64'; Borrello (yellow card) 15'; Spavis (yellow card) 30'; Mwene (yellow card) 35'; Kessel (yellow card) 51' (goal) 83'	Stadium: MSV-Arena; Attendance: 18,273; Referee: Robert Schröder

8 April 2018 29	1. FC Kaiserslautern	1–1	Jahn Regensburg	Kaiserslautern
13:30	Seufert (yellow card) 53'; Vučur (yellow card) 56'; Correia (yellow card) 72'; Andersson 73'	Report	Saller 6'; Gimber (yellow card) 79'; Palionis (yellow card) 90+4'	Stadium: Fritz-Walter-Stadion; Attendance: 27,780; Referee: Robert Kampka

13 April 2018 30	Bochum	3–2	1. FC Kaiserslautern	Bochum
18:30	Hinterseer 18'; Osawe 27' (o.g.); Ochs (yellow card) 51'; Tesche (yellow card) 78'; Stöger 81'	Report	Altıntop 7'; Vučur 48'; Mwene (yellow card) 67'	Stadium: Vonovia Ruhrstadion; Attendance: 23,042; Referee: Bastian Dankert

22 April 2018 31	1. FC Kaiserslautern	0–1	Dynamo Dresden	Kaiserslautern
13:30	Albæk (yellow card) 16'; Mwene (yellow card) 40'; Guwara (yellow card) 53'	Report	Berko (yellow card) 32' (goal) 79'; Hartmann (yellow card) 38' (yellow-red card) 84'	Stadium: Fritz-Walter-Stadion; Attendance: 26,851; Referee: Daniel Siebert

27 April 2018 32	Arminia Bielefeld	3–2	1. FC Kaiserslautern	Bielefeld
18:30	Salger (yellow card) 4'; Klos 62' (pen.), 90+3'; Voglsammer 70'	Report	Andersson 37', 54'; Kessel (red card) 61'; Mwene (yellow card) 90+2'	Stadium: Bielefelder Alm; Attendance: 21,404; Referee: Guido Winkmann

6 May 2018 33	1. FC Kaiserslautern	1–0	1. FC Heidenheim	Kaiserslautern
15:30	Moritz (yellow card) 48'; Andersson 68'; Albæk (yellow card) 85'; Müller (yellow card) 89'	Report	Titsch-Rivero (yellow card) 62'; Skarke (yellow card) 90'	Stadium: Fritz-Walter-Stadion

13 May 2018 34	FC Ingolstadt 04	1–3	1. FC Kaiserslautern	Ingolstadt
15:30	Gaus 49'	Report	Mwene 40', 42'; Andersson 47'	Stadium: Audi Sportpark; Attendance: 11,721; Referee: Sven Waschitzki

=== DFB-Pokal ===
12 August 2018 Round 1	Eichede	0–4	1. FC Kaiserslautern	Lübeck
15:30	Noor Al Tamemy (yellow card) 11'; Nikita Bojarinow (yellow card) 52'; Hendrik Wurr (yellow card) 73'	Report	Osawe 17' 69'; Atik 40'; Moritz 85'	Stadium: Stadion Lohmühle; Attendance: 4,039; Referee: (Germany) Sven Waschitzki

25 October 2018 Last 32	1. FC Kaiserslautern	1–3	VfB Stuttgart	Kaiserslautern
18:30	Spalvis 6' (yellow card) 79'; Abu Hanna (yellow card) 20'; Seufert (yellow card) 41'; Atik (yellow card) 70'	Report	Ginczek 21' (pen.); Akolo 66'; Burnić (yellow card) 69'; Terodde 71'; Beck (yellow card) 79'	Stadium: Fritz-Walter-Stadion; Attendance: 28,322; Referee: (Germany) Patrick Ittrich

== Player statistics ==
=== Appearances and goals ===
No.	Pos	Nat	Player	Total		2. Bundesliga		DFB-Pokal	
No.	Pos	Nat	Player	Apps	Goals	Apps	Goals	Apps	Goals
2	DF	(Argentina) ARG	Giuliano Modica	6	0	5	0	1	0
3	DF	(Germany) GER	Joel Abu Hanna	12	0	11	0	1	0
4	DF	(Germany) GER	Patrick Ziegler	15	0	15	0	0	0
5	DF	(Germany) GER	Benjamin Kessel	26	1	24	1	2	0
6	DF	(Germany) GER	Leon Guwara	27	0	25	0	2	0
7	FW	(Austria) AUT	Brandon Borrello	20	3	19	3	1	0
8	MF	(Germany) GER	Gino Fechner	19	0	17	0	2	0
9	FW	(Sweden) SWE	Sebastian Andersson	30	12	29	12	1	0
10	MF	(Turkey) TUR	Halil Altıntop	14	1	14	1	0	0
11	MF	(Norway) NOR	Ruben Yttergård Jenssen	14	0	14	0	0	0
13	MF	(Germany) GER	Paul Will	0	0	0	0	0	0
14	MF	(Denmark) DEN	Mads Albæk	8	0	7	0	1	0
15	FW	(Ivory Coast) CIV	Dylan Esmel	3	0	3	0	0	0
16	DF	(Montenegro) MNE	Yannick Filipović	0	0	0	0	0	0
17	DF	(Germany) GER	Lukas Gottwalt	0	0	0	0	0	0
18	MF	(Germany) GER	Christoph Moritz	32	5	30	4	2	1
19	DF	(Portugal) POR	Marcel Correia	11	0	11	0	0	0
20	FW	(Poland) POL	Kacper Przybyłko	1	0	1	0	0	0
21	DF	(Austria) AUT	Phillipp Mwene	33	4	31	4	2	0
22	FW	(Netherlands) NED	Gervane Kastaneer	11	0	10	0	1	0
23	DF	(Germany) GER	Jan-Ingwer Callsen-Bracker	12	0	12	0	0	0
24	GK	(Germany) GER	Marius Müller	33	0	32	0	1	0
25	MF	(Germany) GER	Carlo Sickinger	0	0	0	0	0	0
26	FW	(Albania) ALB	Valdrin Mustafa	0	0	0	0	0	0
27	DF	(Germany) GER	Patrick Salata	0	0	0	0	0	0
28	MF	(Germany) GER	Daniel Halfar	10	1	9	1	1	0
29	DF	(Croatia) CRO	Stipe Vučur	36	3	34	3	2	0
30	GK	(Germany) GER	Lennart Grill	0	0	0	0	0	0
31	DF	(Germany) GER	Nino Miotke	0	0	0	0	0	0
32	GK	(Germany) GER	Jan-Ole Sievers	5	0	4	0	1	0
33	FW	(Lithuania) LTU	Lukas Spalvis	25	6	24	5	1	1
34	DF	(Germany) GER	Arthur Ekallé	0	0	0	0	0	0
35	FW	(England) ENG	Osayamen Osawe	27	7	26	5	1	2
36	MF	(Ghana) GHA	Manfred Osei Kwadwo	16	0	16	0	0	0
37	FW	(Germany) GER	Nicklas Shipnoski	9	0	8	0	1	0
38	MF	(Germany) GER	Nils Seufert	21	0	20	0	1	0
39	MF	(Germany) GER	David Tomić	0	0	0	0	0	0
40	MF	(Germany) GER	Torben Müsel	9	0	9	0	0	0
Players transferred out during the season
23	FW	(Turkey) TUR	Barış Atik	14	1	12	0	2	1
25	DF	(Germany) GER	Robin Koch	4	0	3	0	1	0
