= Weidenbach =

Weidenbach (German for willow creek) may refer to:

- Weidenbach, Bavaria, in the district of Ansbach, Bavaria
- Weidenbach, Rhein-Lahn, in the district Rhein-Lahn, Rhineland-Palatinate
- Weidenbach, Vulkaneifel, in the district Vulkaneifel, Rhineland-Palatinate
- Alexis Weidenbach (born 1996), Dominican footballer
- Anton Joseph Weidenbach (1809–1871), German schoolteacher, archivist and historian
- Lisa Weidenbach (born 1961), American distance runner

== See also ==
- Weisenbach, a municipality in Baden-Württemberg, Germany
- Weizenbach, a river in Bavaria, Germany
