= Jens Kunath =

German footballer (born 1967)

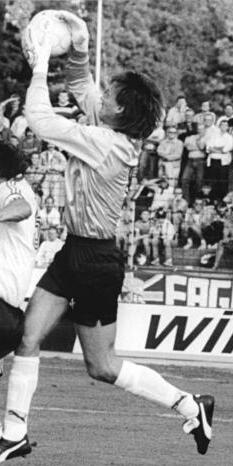
- Kunath catches the ball in a NOFV-Oberliga match against Carl Zeiss Jena in 1990

Personal information
- Date of birth: 15 February 1967 (age 59)
- Place of birth: Lauchhammer, East Germany
- Height: 1.92 m (6 ft 3 1/2 in)
- Position: Goalkeeper

Youth career
- –1985: Hansa Rostock

Senior career*
Years	Team	Apps	(Gls)
1985–1996	Hansa Rostock	124	(0)
1996–1998	Vanguard Huandao		
1998–1999	EFC Stahl	10	(0)
1999–2000	FC Mallorca Topline		
2000–2001	FC Anker Wismar	5	(0)

Managerial career
- 2003–2006: SV Warnemünde
- * Club domestic league appearances and goals

Jens Kunath (born 15 February 1967) is a German former footballer.
