= Osayamen Osawe =

English footballer (born 1993)

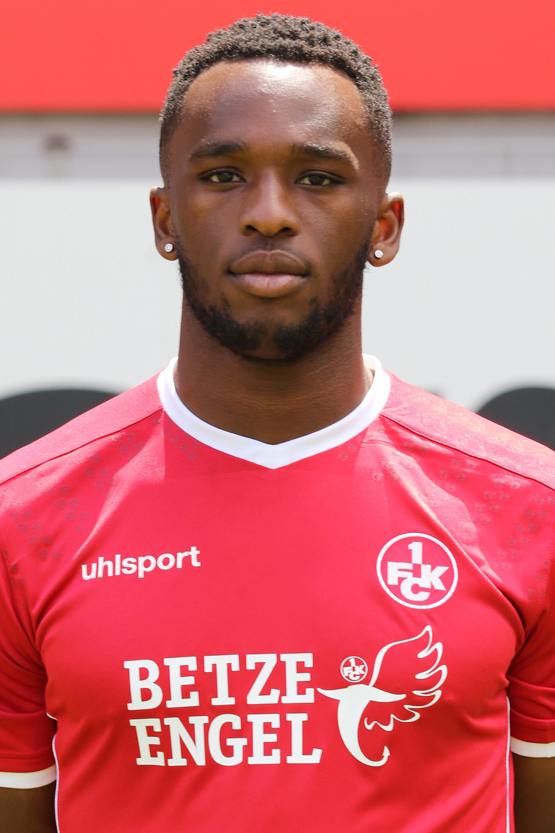
- Osawe with 1. FC Kaiserslautern in 2017

Personal information
- Date of birth: 3 September 1993 (age 33)
- Place of birth: Benin City, Nigeria
- Height: 1.81 m (5 ft 11 in)
- Position: Striker

Youth career
- –2010: Manchester City
- 2010–2012: Blackburn Rovers

Senior career*
Years	Team	Apps	(Gls)
2012–2013	Blackburn Rovers	0	(0)
2012	→ Accrington Stanley (loan)	2	(0)
2013	→ Hyde (loan)	2	(0)
2013–2014	Southport	41	(6)
2014–2016	Hallescher FC	70	(17)
2016–2018	1. FC Kaiserslautern	57	(11)
2018–2019	FC Ingolstadt	16	(0)
2019–2021	KFC Uerdingen	39	(9)
2022–2023	FC Halifax Town	7	(1)
2023	Rot-Weiß Erfurt	12	(2)
Total		246	(26)
- * Club domestic league appearances and goals

Osayamen Osawe (born 3 September 1993) is a Nigerian former professional footballer who played as a striker. In addition to holding his Nigerian Citizenship, Osawe also holds British citizenship.

== Career ==
=== Career in England ===
Born in Benin City, Nigeria, Osawe moved to England and raised in Manchester, England, where he grew up in Cheetham Hill. He was previously at Manchester City Academy before joining Blackburn Rovers on a two–year contract in 2010, where he progressed through the academy and the reserve team. He made his first appearance for Blackburn's first team when he appeared on the substitute bench in a pre-season friendly against Accrington Stanley in July 2011.

A year later, on 26 October 2012, Osawe joined Accrington Stanley on a one-month loan deal. Three days later, on 29 October 2012, he made his Accrington Stanley debut, coming on as a substitute for Will Hatfield in the 59th minute, in a 1–0 win over Bristol Rovers. After making two more appearances, he returned to his parent club.

On 30 January 2013, Osawe was loaned out again when he joined Hyde on a one-month loan deal. He made his Hyde debut on 2 February 2013, where he played 17 minutes in the match, as Hyde lost 2–1 to Woking. He made only one further appearance before returning to his parent club. At the end of the season, he was released by the club.

On 9 August 2013, Osawe signed for Southport following his release from Blackburn Rovers. He made his Southport, where he came on as a substitute for Paul Rutherford in the 88th minute, in a 1–0 win over Luton Town. He scored his first Southport goal on 31 August 2013, in a 1–0 win over Aldershot Town, followed up by scoring in the next game on 7 September 2013, in a 4–1 loss against Tamworth. He played 41 first team games and scoring some important goals, including adding four more goals later in the season against Alfreton Town, Grimsby Town, Dartford and Macclesfield Town.

=== Hallescher FC ===
After a season at Southport, Osawe moved abroad to Germany when he signed for Hallescher FC on a two–year contract in July 2014. He previously went on a trial at Halle and impressed the club's management that convinced him a contract. Upon moving abroad, he admitted hesitant to move to Germany because he was on his own, but managed to overcome the fear.

Osawe made his Halle debut in the opening game of the season, in a 3–0 loss against Chemnitzer FC on 26 July 2014. Seven days later, on 2 August 2014, he scored his first goals, in a 5–1 win over Arminia Bielefeld. However, he suffered a goal drought for the most part of the season until he scored his first goal since August on 14 March 2015, in a 3–1 win over Energie Cottbus. He scored four more league goals against Rot-Weiß Erfurt, Holstein Kiel, Jahn Regensburg and 1. FSV Mainz 05 II. Osawe also scored twice in the final of Saxony-Anhalt Cup, in a 6–0 win over VfL Halle 1896. In his first season at Hallescher FC, he made thirty–two appearances and scored seven times.

As Osawe became the club's fan favourite among supporters, the club started open a contract negotiation with Osawe. He then scored his first goal of the season on 16 August 2015, in a 2–1 loss against FC Magdeburg. By September, he added two more goals against Stuttgart and Rot-Weiß Erfurt. Osawe scored his first hat–trick of his professional career, in a 6–2 win over Werder Bremen II, which followed up when he scored two goals in two matches against Chemnitzer FC and Fortuna Köln He added two more goals against Holstein Kiel and Sonnenhof Großaspach. He, once again, scored and set up a goal, in the final of Saxony-Anhalt Cup, in a 2–1 win over FC Magdeburg. He played in every 3. Liga match for the club in his second season, and scored 10 goals.

=== 1. FC Kaiserslautern ===
In May, Osawe signed a pre-contract agreement with 2. Bundesliga outfit 1. FC Kaiserslautern. He was previously linked with a move to Paderborn and Ingolstadt 04. Osawe also revealed that he could have played in 2.Bundesliga or returned to England before joining 1. FC Kaiserslautern. He made his 1. FC Kaiserslautern debut in the opening game of the season, where he made his first start, in a 4–0 heavy defeat to Hannover 96.

=== FC Ingolstadt 04 ===
In May 2018, it was announced Osawe would join FC Ingolstadt 04 for the 2018–19 season having signed a contract until 2020. He played 16 times without scoring for Ingolstadt.

On 15 January 2019, he joined 3. Liga side KFC Uerdingen on a 2 1/2-year deal.

=== FC Halifax Town ===
On 27 August 2022, Osawe returned to England to join FC Halifax Town following his release from KFC Uerdingen.

== Style of play ==
Hallescher FC manager Sven Köhler described Osawe as quick and eager to score.

== Personal life ==
Osawe speaks English and German, having been taking German classes at the recommendation from Sven Köhler. Osawe's family moved from Nigeria to England in 2002 and has two brothers and sisters. Growing up, Osawe supported Manchester United.

In August 2015, Osawe's car was dismantled after being involved in a car collision. This came after weeks when his car was vandalised with graffiti with neo-Nazi symbols.

== Career statistics ==
Appearances and goals by club, season and competition
Club	Season	League			National Cup		Other		Total	
Club	Season	Division	Apps	Goals	Apps	Goals	Apps	Goals	Apps	Goals
Blackburn Rovers	2012–13	Championship	0	0	0	0	0	0	0	0
Accrington Stanley (loan)	2012–13	League Two	2	0	1	0	0	0	3	0
Hyde United (loan)	2012–13	Conference Premier	2	0	0	0	0	0	2	0
Southport	2013–14	Conference Premier	41	6	0	0	0	0	41	6
Hallescher FC	2014–15	3. Liga	32	7	—		—		32	7
Hallescher FC	2015–16	3. Liga	38	10	1	0	—		39	10
Hallescher FC	Total		70	17	1	0	0	0	71	17
1. FC Kaiserslautern	2016–17	2. Bundesliga	31	6	1	2	—		32	8
1. FC Kaiserslautern	2017–18	2. Bundesliga	26	5	1	2	—		27	7
1. FC Kaiserslautern	Total		57	11	2	4	0	0	59	15
FC Ingolstadt	2018–19	2. Bundesliga	16	0	0	0	—		16	0
KFC Uerdingen	2018–19	3. Liga	17	6	—		—		17	6
KFC Uerdingen	2019–20	3. Liga	21	3	1	0	—		22	3
KFC Uerdingen	2020–21	3. Liga	1	0	—		—		1	0
KFC Uerdingen	Total		39	9	1	0	0	0	40	9
FC Halifax Town	2022–23	National League	7	1	0	0	0	0	7	1
Rot-Weiß Erfurt	2022–23	Regionalliga Nordost	12	2	—		—		12	2
Career total			246	46	5	4	0	0	251	50

== Honours ==
- Saxony-Anhalt Cup: 2015, 2016
