= Martin Zurawsky =

German footballer

Personal information
- Full name: Martin Zurawsky
- Date of birth: 12 August 1990 (age 36)
- Place of birth: Lauchhammer, East Germany
- Height: 1.86 m (6 ft 1 in)
- Position: Left back

Team information
- Current team: VfB Krieschow
- Number: 13

Youth career
- VfB Senftenberg
- –2008: SV Askania Schipkau
- 2008–2010: Jahn Regensburg

Senior career*
Years	Team	Apps	(Gls)
2010–2012	Jahn Regensburg	8	(0)
2012–2014	VfB Auerbach	43	(7)
2014–2016	BFC Dynamo	34	(4)
2016	Viktoria Berlin	10	(0)
2016–2019	Union Fürstenwalde	75	(9)
2019–	VfB Krieschow	27	(5)
- * Club domestic league appearances and goals as of 8 February 2021

Martin Zurawsky (born 12 August 1990) is a German footballer who plays for NOFV-Oberliga Süd club VfB Krieschow.

Zurawsky made his professional debut during the 2010–11 3. Fußball-Liga season for Jahn Regensburg as a substitute for Mahmut Temür in a 2–1 away win over Carl Zeiss Jena.
