= Magdalena Schmidt =

East German artistic gymnast

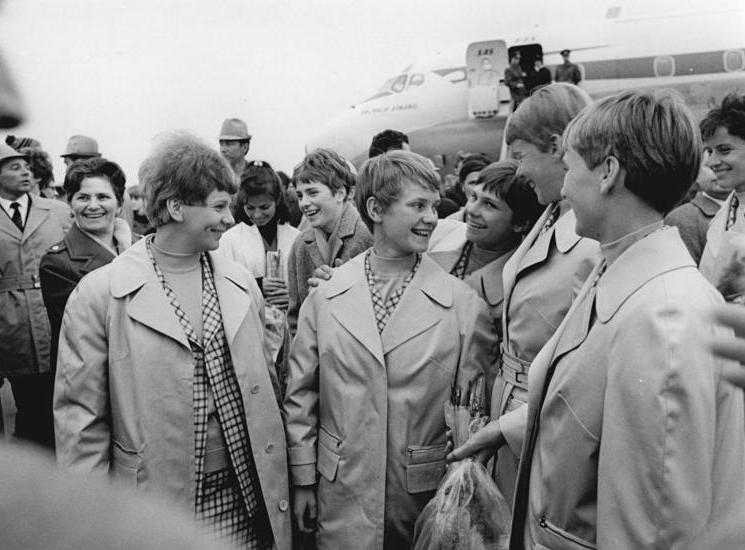
- Magdalena Schmidt (in the foreground, third from left) in 1968

Personal information
- Born: 30 June 1949 (age 77) Lauchhammer, Soviet occupation zone of Germany
- Height: 1.60 m (5 ft 3 in)
- Weight: 50 kg (110 lb)

Sport
- Sport: Artistic gymnastics
- Club: SC Dynamo Berlin
Medal record
Representing East Germany
Olympic Games
Bronze medal – third place	1968 Mexico City	Team

Magdalena Schmidt (later Magdalena Jakob, born 30 June 1949) is a retired German gymnast. She competed at the 1968 Summer Olympics in all artistic gymnastics events and won a bronze medal in the team competition. Her best individual result was seventh place in the vault.
