= Marius Müller (footballer, born 1993) =

German footballer

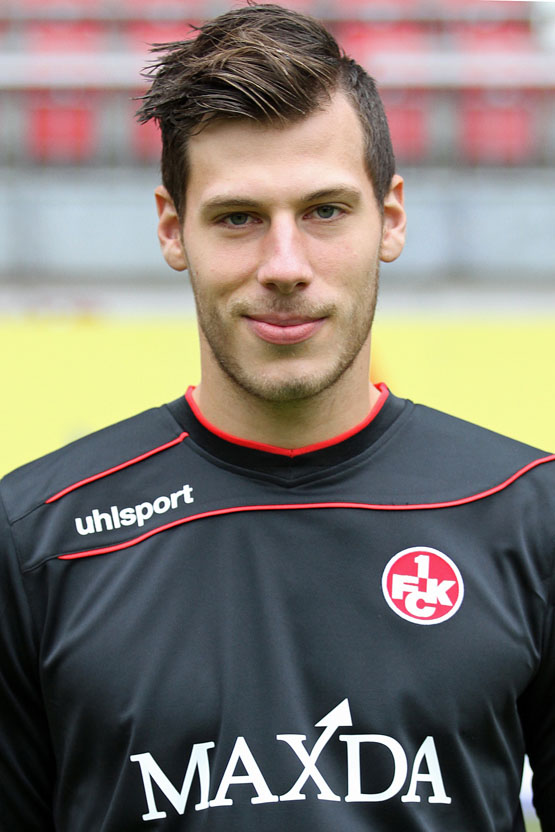
- Müller with 1. FC Kaiserslautern in 2015

Personal information
- Date of birth: 12 July 1993 (age 33)
- Place of birth: Heppenheim, Germany
- Height: 1.92 m (6 ft 4 in)
- Position: Goalkeeper

Team information
- Current team: Aberdeen
- Number: 27

Youth career
- 1999–2003: TV 1883 Lampertheim
- 2003–2012: 1. FC Kaiserslautern

Senior career*
Years	Team	Apps	(Gls)
2012–2014	1. FC Kaiserslautern II	60	(0)
2012–2016	1. FC Kaiserslautern	40	(0)
2016–2019	RB Leipzig	0	(0)
2016–2017	RB Leipzig II	5	(0)
2017–2018	→ 1. FC Kaiserslautern (loan)	32	(0)
2019–2023	FC Luzern	120	(0)
2023–2024	Schalke 04	21	(0)
2024–2026	VfL Wolfsburg	6	(0)
2026–	Aberdeen	0	(0)

International career^{‡}
2013–2014	Germany U20	3	(0)
- * Club domestic league appearances and goals as of 16 May 2026 ‡ National team caps and goals as of 5 March 2014

Marius Müller (born 12 July 1993) is a German professional footballer who plays as a goalkeeper for Scottish Premiership club Aberdeen.

== Club career ==
=== 1 FC Kaiserslautern ===
Müller joined 1. FC Kaiserslautern in 2002 from TV 1883 Lampertheim. He made his 2. Bundesliga debut at 11 May 2014 against Fortuna Düsseldorf in a 4–2 away loss.

=== RB Leipzig ===
In June 2016, he moved to RB Leipzig agreeing to a three-contract. The transfer fee paid to Kaiserslautern was reported as about €1.7 million. In July 2017, Müller returned to 1. FC Kaiserslautern from RB Leipzig, on a one-year loan.

=== Luzern ===
On 5 July 2019, Müller signed for Swiss Super League club FC Luzern.

=== Schalke 04 ===
On 22 June 2023, Müller signed a two-year contract with recently relegated 2. Bundesliga club Schalke 04.

=== VfL Wolfsburg ===
On 4 June 2024, Müller joined Bundesliga club VfL Wolfsburg.

=== Aberdeen ===
On 15 July 2026, Müller signed a two-year contract with Aberdeen in Scotland.

== Career statistics ==
As of match played 28 October 2025

Appearances and goals by club, season and competition
Club	Season	League			Cup		Europe		Other		Total	
Club	Season	Division	Apps	Goals	Apps	Goals	Apps	Goals	Apps	Goals	Apps	Goals
1. FC Kaiserslautern II	2011–12	Regionalliga West	1	0	—		—		—		1	0
1. FC Kaiserslautern II	2012–13	Regionalliga Südwest	33	0	—		—		—		33	0
1. FC Kaiserslautern II	2013–14	Regionalliga Südwest	22	0	—		—		—		22	0
1. FC Kaiserslautern II	2014–15	Regionalliga Südwest	4	0	—		—		—		4	0
1. FC Kaiserslautern II	Total		60	0	—		—		—		60	0
1. FC Kaiserslautern	2013–14	2. Bundesliga	1	0	0	0	—		—		1	0
1. FC Kaiserslautern	2014–15	2. Bundesliga	6	0	2	0	—		—		8	0
1. FC Kaiserslautern	2015–16	2. Bundesliga	33	0	2	0	—		—		35	0
1. FC Kaiserslautern	Total		40	0	4	0	—		—		44	0
RB Leipzig	2016–17	Bundesliga	0	0	0	0	—		—		0	0
RB Leipzig	2018–19	Bundesliga	0	0	0	0	1	0	—		1	0
RB Leipzig	Total		0	0	0	0	1	0	—		1	0
RB Leipzig II	2016–17	Regionalliga Nordost	5	0	—		—		—		5	0
1. FC Kaiserslautern (loan)	2017–18	2. Bundesliga	32	0	1	0	—		—		33	0
FC Luzern	2019–20	Swiss Super League	35	0	4	0	4	0	—		43	0
FC Luzern	2020–21	Swiss Super League	34	0	5	0	—		—		39	0
FC Luzern	2021–22	Swiss Super League	26	0	2	0	0	0	2 (Note: Appearances in Swiss Super League relegation play-offs.)	0	30	0
FC Luzern	2022–23	Swiss Super League	25	0	2	0	—		—		27	0
FC Luzern	Total		120	0	13	0	4	0	2	0	139	0
Schalke 04	2023–24	2. Bundesliga	21	0	1	0	—		—		22	0
VfL Wolfsburg	2024–25	Bundesliga	6	0	1	0	—		—		7	0
VfL Wolfsburg	2025–26	Bundesliga	0	0	1	0	—		—		1	0
VfL Wolfsburg	Total		6	0	2	0	—		—		8	0
Career total			284	0	21	0	5	0	2	0	312	0

== Honours ==
FC Luzern

- Swiss Cup: 2020–21
