= Alexis Weidenbach =

Dominican footballer (born 1996)

Personal information
- Date of birth: 26 September 1996 (age 30)
- Place of birth: Villa Mella, Dominican Republic
- Height: 1.88 m (6 ft 2 in)
- Position: Midfielder

Team information
- Current team: SG 99 Andernach
- Number: 21

Youth career
- –2016: SG 99 Andernach

Senior career*
Years	Team	Apps	(Gls)
2016	SpVgg Burgbrohl	17	(0)
2017–2023	Rot-Weiß Koblenz	174	(5)
2023	FV Engers 07	12	(0)
2023–2024	Rot-Weiß Koblenz	38	(3)
2024	BSV Schwarz-Weiß Rehden	17	(0)
2025–	SG 99 Andernach	38	(2)

International career
2021	Dominican Republic	2	(0)
- * Club domestic league appearances and goals

Alexis Weidenbach (born 26 September 1996) is a Dominican football player who plays as a midfielder for German Rheinlandliga club SG 99 Andernach. He is a former Dominican Republic international.

== International career ==
Weidenbach was born to a German father and a Dominican mother. Weidenbach made his international debut for the Dominican Republic in a 1–0 loss to Puerto Rico.

== Career statistics ==
=== Club ===
As of match played 8 May 2026

Club	Season	League			National cup		Regional cup		Other		Total	
Club	Season	Division	Apps	Goals	Apps	Goals	Apps	Goals	Apps	Goals	Apps	Goals
SG 99 Andernach	2015–16	Rheinlandliga	31	1	0	0	1 (Note: Appearances in the Rhineland Cup)	1	0	0	32	2
SpVgg Burgbrohl	2016–17	Oberliga Rheinland-Pfalz/Saar	17	0	0	0	3	2	0	0	20	2
Rot-Weiß Koblenz	2016–17	Oberliga Rheinland-Pfalz/Saar	13	0	0	0	0	0	0	0	13	0
Rot-Weiß Koblenz	2017–18	Oberliga Rheinland-Pfalz/Saar	32	2	0	0	3	2	0	0	35	4
Rot-Weiß Koblenz	2018–19	Oberliga Rheinland-Pfalz/Saar	33	1	1	0	2	0	0	0	35	1
Rot-Weiß Koblenz	2019–20	Regionalliga Südwest	17	1	0	0	4	0	0	0	21	1
Rot-Weiß Koblenz	2020–21	Regionalliga Südwest	28	1	0	0	7	2	0	0	35	3
Rot-Weiß Koblenz	2021–22	Regionalliga Südwest	33	0	1	0	3	0	0	0	37	0
Rot-Weiß Koblenz	2022–23	Regionalliga Südwest	18	0	0	0	2	1	0	0	20	1
Rot-Weiß Koblenz	Total		174	5	2	0	21	5	0	0	197	10
FV Engers 07	2022–23	Oberliga Rheinland-Pfalz/Saar	12	0	0	0	1	0	0	0	13	0
Rot-Weiß Koblenz	2023–24	Oberliga Rheinland-Pfalz/Saar	38	3	0	1	0	2	0	0	41	3
BSV Schwarz-Weiß Rehden	2024–25	Oberliga Niedersachsen	17	0	0	0	1 (Note: Appearances in the Lower Saxony Cup)	0	0	0	18	0
SG 99 Andernach	2024–25	Rheinlandliga	12	0	0	0	0	0	0	0	12	0
SG 99 Andernach	2025–26	Rheinlandliga	26	2	0	0	2	0	0	0	28	2
SG 99 Andernach	Total		38	2	0	0	2	0	0	0	40	2
Career total			327	11	3	0	31	8	0	0	338	19

=== International ===
As of matches played 25 January 2021

National team	Year	Apps	Goals
Dominican Republic	2021	2	0
Total		2	0
