= Lauchhammer =

Lauchhammer Łuchow
- Town
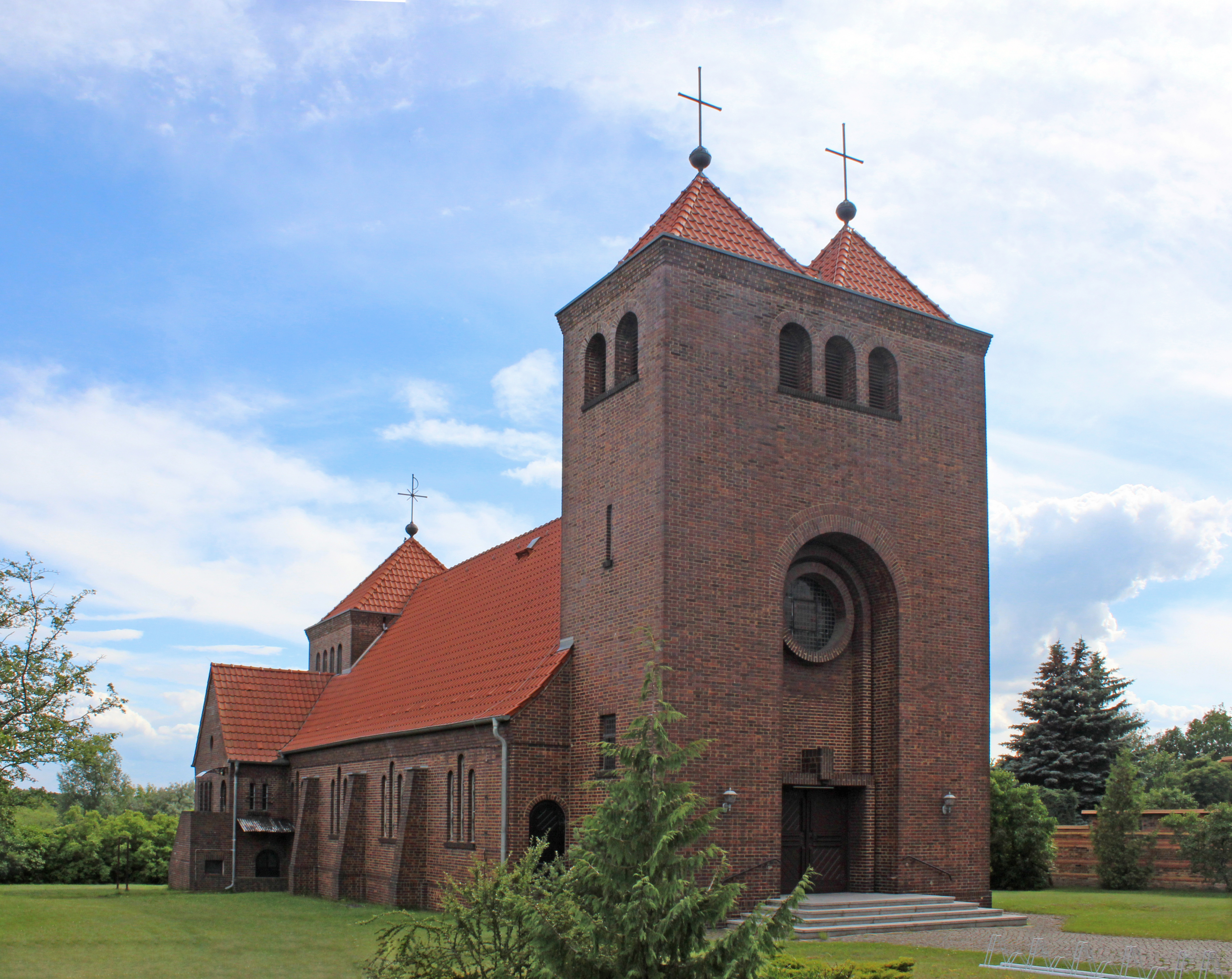
- Church of Christ, the King

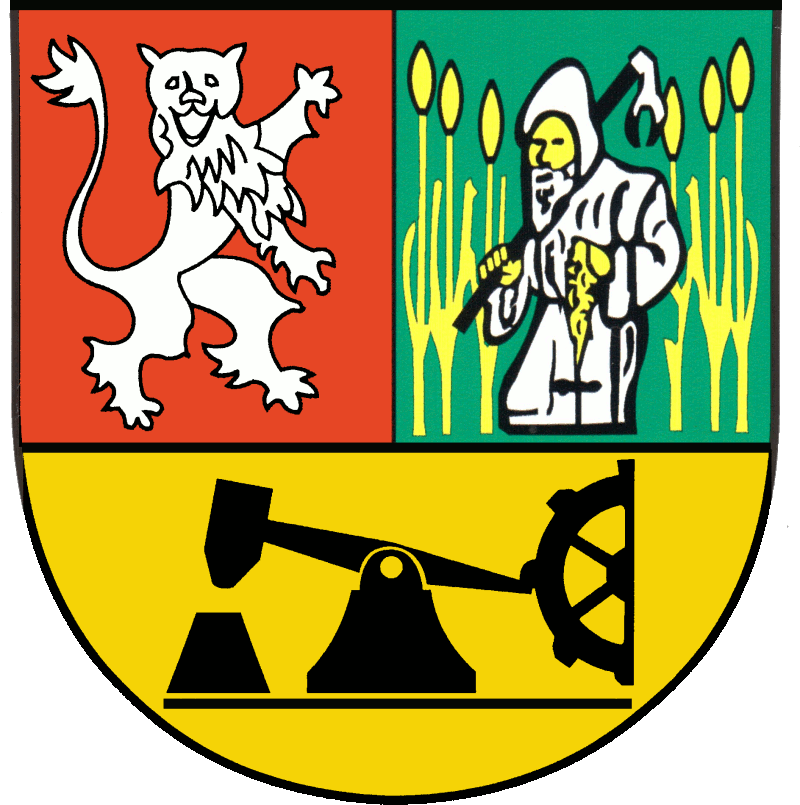
- Coat of arms

- Location of Lauchhammer; Łuchow within Oberspreewald-Lausitz district
- Interactive map of Lauchhammer; Łuchow
- Location within Germany Location within Brandenburg
- Coordinates: 51°30′N 13°48′E
- Country: Germany
- State: Brandenburg
- District: Oberspreewald-Lausitz
- Subdivisions: 5 Stadt- und 2 Ortsteile

Government
  - Mayor (2021–29): Mirko Buhr

Area
  - Total: 88.89 km^{2} (34.32 sq mi)
- Elevation: 94–160 m (308–525 ft)

Population (2025-12-31)
  - Total: 13,801
  - Density: 155.3/km^{2} (402.1/sq mi)
- Time zone: UTC+01:00 (CET)
  - Summer (DST): UTC+02:00 (CEST)
- Postal codes: 01979
- Dialling codes: 03574
- Vehicle registration: OSL
- Website: www.lauchhammer.de

Lauchhammer (German pronunciation: [ˈlaʊxˌhamɐ]; Lower Sorbian: Łuchow, pronounced [ˈwuxɔw]) is a town in the Oberspreewald-Lausitz district, in southern Brandenburg, Germany. It is situated on the Black Elster river, approx. 17 km west of Senftenberg, and 50 km north of Dresden.

== History ==
From 1815 to 1944, Lauchhammer was part of the Prussian Province of Saxony and from 1944 to 1945 of the Province of Halle-Merseburg. From 1947 to 1952 it was part of Saxony-Anhalt and from 1952 to 1990 of the Bezirk Cottbus of East Germany.

== Demography ==
Development of Population since 1875 within the Current Boundaries (Blue Line: Population; Dotted Line: Comparison to Population Development of Brandenburg state; Grey Background: Time of Nazi rule; Red Background: Time of Communist rule)

Recent Population Development and Projections (Population Development before Census 2011 (blue line); Recent Population Development according to the Census in Germany in 2011 (blue bordered line); Official projections for 2005-2030 (yellow line); for 2017-2030 (scarlet line); for 2020-2030 (green line)

Lauchhammer: Population development
within the current boundaries (2020)

Year	Pop.	±% p.a.
1875	4,627	—
1890	6,054	+1.81%
1910	10,151	+2.62%
1925	17,259	+3.60%
1939	22,467	+1.90%
1950	27,524	+1.86%
1964	32,757	+1.25%

Year	Pop.	±% p.a.
1971	31,854	−0.40%
1981	27,102	−1.60%
1985	26,626	−0.44%
1990	24,945	−1.30%
1995	22,948	−1.66%
2000	20,769	−1.98%
2005	18,697	−2.08%

Year	Pop.	±% p.a.
2010	16,956	−1.94%
2015	15,084	−2.31%
2016	14,791	−1.94%
2017	14,569	−1.50%
2018	14,622	+0.36%
2019	14,336	−1.96%
2020	14,070	−1.86%

== Transport ==
Lauchhammer lies on the Węgliniec–Roßlau railway and offers connections to Leipzig and Cottbus.

== Notable people ==
- Sven Benken (born 1970), footballer
- Hans-Joachim Brauske (1943–2025), boxer
- Danny Breitfelder (born 1997), footballer
- Thomas Gumpert (1952–2021), actor
- Klaus Haertter (born 1952), fencer
- Stefan Härtel (born 1988), boxer
- Jens Kunath (born 1967), footballer
- Annett Neumann (born 1970), track cyclist
- Magdalena Schmidt (born 1949), gymnast
- Sebastian Schuppan (born 1986), footballer
- Mario Veit (born 1973), boxer
- Annelore Zinke (born 1958), gymnast
- Martin Zurawsky (born 1990), footballer
