= Valdrin Mustafa =

Footballer (born 1998)

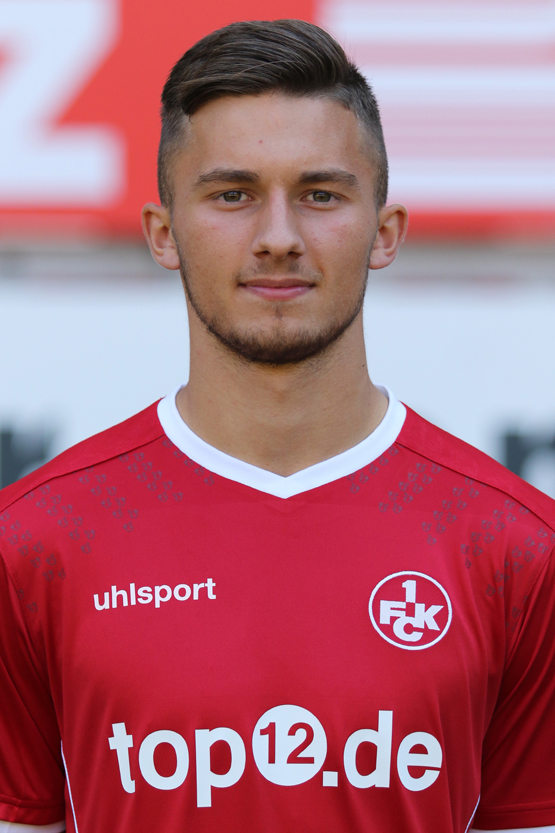
- Mustafa with 1. FC Kaiserslautern, 2017

Personal information
- Date of birth: 11 March 1998 (age 28)
- Place of birth: Merzig, Germany
- Height: 1.83 m (6 ft 0 in)
- Position: Striker

Team information
- Current team: Elversberg II

Youth career
- 2002–2010: SG Rehlingen-Siersburg
- 2010–2012: JFG Saarlouis
- 2012–2014: 1. FC Saarbrücken
- 2014–2017: 1. FC Kaiserslautern

Senior career*
Years	Team	Apps	(Gls)
2017–2019	1. FC Kaiserslautern II	39	(15)
2019–2020	Hannover 96 II	30	(9)
2020–2021	Rot-Weiß Koblenz	38	(18)
2021	SC Verl	0	(0)
2021–2023	SV Elversberg	58	(19)
2023–2024	Viktoria Köln	12	(0)
2024	Jahn Regensburg	10	(0)
2024–2026	Kickers Offenbach	51	(14)
2026–	SV Elversberg II (res.)	0	(0)

International career^{‡}
2016	Albania U19	1	(1)
2017	Albania U20	1	(0)
2017	Albania U21	7	(0)
2019–2020	Kosovo U21	5	(0)
- * Club domestic league appearances and goals as of 26 June 2026 ‡ National team caps and goals as of 17 November 2020

Valdrin Mustafa (born 11 March 1998) is a professional footballer who plays as a striker for Oberliga Rheinland-Pfalz/Saar club Elversberg II. Born in Germany, he has represented Albania and Kosovo internationally at youth levels.

== Club career ==
=== SC Verl ===
On 25 May 2021, Mustafa signed a two-year contract with 3. Liga club SC Verl and this transfer would become legally effective in July 2021. Two month later, he was named as a SC Verl substitute for the first time in a league match against Türkgücü München. His debut with SC Verl came on 18 August in the 2021–22 Westphalian Cup first round against SG Wattenscheid 09 after being named in the starting line-up.

=== SV Elversberg ===
On 31 August 2021, Mustafa signed a two-year contract with Regionalliga Südwest club SV Elversberg. Four days later, he made his debut in a 2–1 away win against 1899 Hoffenheim II after coming on as a substitute at 64th minute in place of Nico Karger. Ten days after debut, Mustafa scored his first goal for SV Elversberg in his third appearance for the club in a 2–0 away win over Astoria Walldorf in Regionalliga Südwest.

=== Jahn Regensburg ===
On 16 January 2024, Mustafa moved to 3. Liga club Jahn Regensburg.

=== Kickers Offenbach ===
On 11 June 2024, Mustafa signed with Kickers Offenbach in Regionalliga.

=== Return to Elversberg ===
On 10 August 2026, Mustafa rejoined Elversberg, but this time to joining its reserve team Elversberg II.

== International career ==
From 2016, until 2017, Mustafa has been part of Albania at youth international level, respectively has been part of the U19, U20, and U21 teams and he with these teams played nine matches and scored one goal.

On 7 August 2019, the Football Federation of Kosovo announced that Mustafa had decided to represent their country. On 2 September 2019, he received a call-up from Kosovo U21 for the 2021 UEFA European Under-21 Championship qualification match against England U21, and made his debut after coming on as a substitute at 46th minute in place of Mirlind Daku.
