= Danny Breitfelder =

German footballer

Personal information
- Date of birth: 19 February 1997 (age 29)
- Place of birth: Lauchhammer, Germany
- Height: 1.80 m (5 ft 11 in)
- Position: Forward

Team information
- Current team: Hessen Kassel
- Number: 22

Youth career
- –2013: Energie Cottbus
- 2014–2015: Dynamo Dresden
- 2015–2016: Chemnitzer FC

Senior career*
Years	Team	Apps	(Gls)
2016–2018	Chemnitzer FC	12	(1)
2018	Union Fürstenwalde	14	(5)
2018–2019	Sportfreunde Lotte	0	(0)
2019–2020	ZFC Meuselwitz	12	(2)
2020–2021	Chemnitzer FC	12	(1)
2021–2022	Rot-Weiß Koblenz	25	(3)
2022–2023	TSV Steinbach	23	(4)
2023–2025	Fortuna Köln	37	(7)
2025–	Hessen Kassel	23	(2)
- * Club domestic league appearances and goals as of 26 June 2026

Danny Breitfelder (born 19 February 1997) is a German footballer who plays as a forward for Hessen Kassel.
