= Lukas Spalvis =

Lithuanian footballer (born 1994)

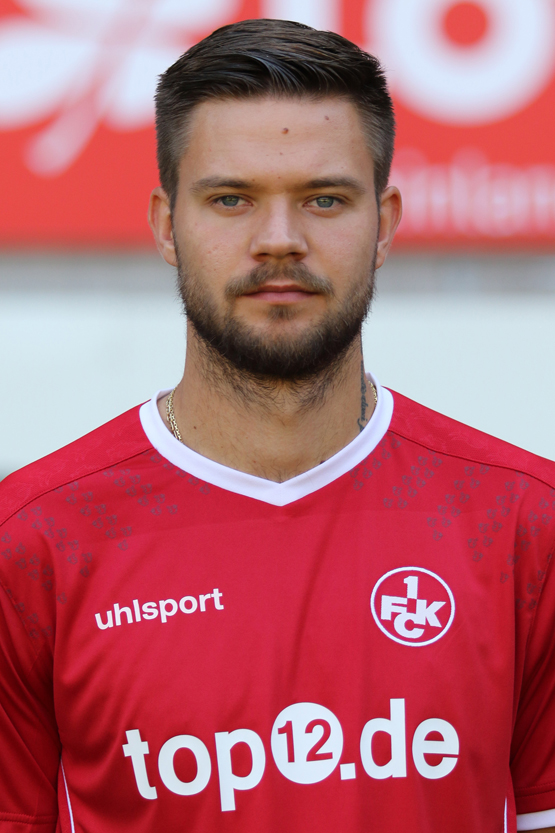
- Spalvis in 2017.

Personal information
- Full name: Lukas Spalvis
- Date of birth: 27 July 1994 (age 32)
- Place of birth: Vilnius, Lithuania
- Height: 1.89 m (6 ft 2 in)
- Position: Forward

Youth career
- 2009–2011: SV Weil 1910
- 2011–2012: SC Freiburg
- 2012–2013: AaB

Senior career*
Years	Team	Apps	(Gls)
2013–2016	AaB	53	(26)
2016–2018	Sporting CP	0	(0)
2017	→ Belenenses (loan)	0	(0)
2017–2018	→ 1. FC Kaiserslautern (loan)	24	(5)
2017–2018	→ 1. FC Kaiserslautern II (loan)	1	(2)
2018–2021	1. FC Kaiserslautern	31	(8)
Total		109	(41)

International career^{‡}
2012–2013	Lithuania U19	3	(0)
2014–2015	Lithuania U21	8	(4)
2014–2017	Lithuania	18	(2)
- * Club domestic league appearances and goals as of 12:15, 19 October 2021 (UTC) ‡ National team caps and goals as of 22:48, 1 August 2019 (UTC)

Lukas Spalvis (born 27 July 1994) is a retired Lithuanian professional footballer who last played as forward for 1. FC Kaiserslautern.

== Early years ==
Lukas Spalvis was born in Lithuania. When he was six, he emigrated with his mother from Lithuania and settled in Germany in Grenzach-Wyhlen. While living in the Part of Wyhlen, he went to a German school.

== Club career ==
=== Youth ===
Spalvis joined in 2010 the SV Weil 1910 from Weil am Rhein, the neighboring town of Grenzach-Wyhlen. In 2011, he joined the youth academy of SC Freiburg.

=== AaB ===
Spalvis joined the club as a youth player in 2012 and was promoted to the first team squad in the summer of 2013. He got his first match for AaB when he was in the line up in the DBU Pokalen game against Silkeborg IF on 29 August 2013. His first Danish Superliga appearance happened on 6 October 2013 when he was subbed in during the 74th minute against Viborg FF.

While playing for AaB, Spalvis earned the nickname "Zweimal" meaning "twice" in German. He earned this nickname because he, for every match in which he scored a goal, always scored a second goal in the game as well. This streak held for 5 matches, until scoring just one goal against OB on 24 August 2015.

In the first half of the 2015–16 Danish Superliga Season, he had impressively scored 14 goals in 17 league matches, leading to transfer rumors about Spalvis moving to Galatasaray and Sporting Clube de Portugal.

=== Sporting CP ===
On 8 February 2016, it was confirmed, that Spalvis will move to Sporting Clube de Portugal from 1 July 2016. He would therefore play in AaB to the end of the 2015–16 Danish Superliga-season.

Due to his many injuries, Spalvis didn't play any games for Sporting in the first half season, and the club loaned out the forward to Belenenses on 1 January 2017. But only 16 days later, they called Spalvis back from Belenenses and canceled the contract, because 'he wasn't fit enough' and 'they wasn't ready to take that risk'.

On 2 February 2017, Sporting announced that Spalvis would play the remainder of the year on loan for Norwegian club Rosenborg BK. Rosenborg said that Spalvis would transfer to them on loan if he passed his medical. Spalvis had suffered from a severe knee injury since his arrival at Sporting. On 14 February, Spalvis failed his medical and Rosenborg said that Spalvis was not ready for the club pending that Sporting would pay the players fees during his rehabilitation with them. On 27 February, Rosenborg announced that the transfer would not be completed as Rosenborg and Sporting could not come to a deal that satisfied the Norwegian club.

=== 1. FC Kaiserslautern ===
Spalvis was loaned out again on 5 July 2017, joining 2. Bundesliga side 1. FC Kaiserslautern for the 2017–18 season. On 8 May 2018, it was announced that he had joined 1. FC Kaiserslautern on a permanent deal.

On 25 August 2018, in a league match against Karlsruher SC, he sustained a cartilage injury to his knee. The injury was estimated to keep him out of action for a "long" time. After two years without team training he returned in April 2021.

He agreed the termination of his contract in October 2021.

== International career ==
Spalvis played several matches for youth national teams, including Lithuania U-19 and Lithuania U-21. In March 2014 he made his debut for the senior team, in a friendly match against Kazakhstan.

== Career statistics ==
=== Club ===
As of 19 October 2021

Appearances and goals by club, season and competition
Club	Season	League			National Cup		Continental		Total	
Club	Season	Division	Apps	Goals	Apps	Goals	Apps	Goals	Apps	Goals
AaB	2013–14	Danish Superliga	17	8	5	3	—		22	11
AaB	2014–15	Danish Superliga	6	0	—		2	0	8	1
AaB	2015–16	Danish Superliga	30	18	3	1	—		29	18
AaB	Total		53	26	6	4	2	0	61	30
Sporting CP	2016–17	Primeira Liga	0	0	0	0	0	0	0	0
1. FC Kaiserslautern (loan)	2017–18	2. Bundesliga	24	5	1	1	0	0	25	6
1. FC Kaiserslautern	2018–19	3. Liga	5	1	1	1	0	0	6	2
Career total			67	30	7	5	2	0	76	35

=== International ===
Appearances and goals by national team and year
National team	Year	Apps	Goals
Lithuania	2014	4	1
Lithuania	2015	6	1
Lithuania	2016	5	0
Lithuania	2017	3	0
Total		18	2

Scores and results list Lithuania's goal tally first, score column indicates score after each Spalvis goal.

List of international goals scored by Lukas Spalvis
No.	Date	Venue	Opponent	Score	Result	Competition	Ref.
1	6 June 2014	PGE Arena Gdańsk, Gdańsk, Poland	Poland	1–0	1–2	Friendly	
2	8 September 2015	LFF Stadium, Vilnius, Lithuania	San Marino	2–1	2–1	UEFA Euro 2016 qualification	

== Honours ==
=== Club ===
AaB

- Danish Superliga: 2013–14
- Danish Cup: 2013–14

=== Individual ===
- Lithuanian Footballer of the Year: 2015
- Best player in the fall 2015, Superliga.
- Player of the Month, Superliga (2): April 2014 and October 2015.
- UEFA Top Scorer
