= Lukas Gottwalt =

German footballer (born 1997)

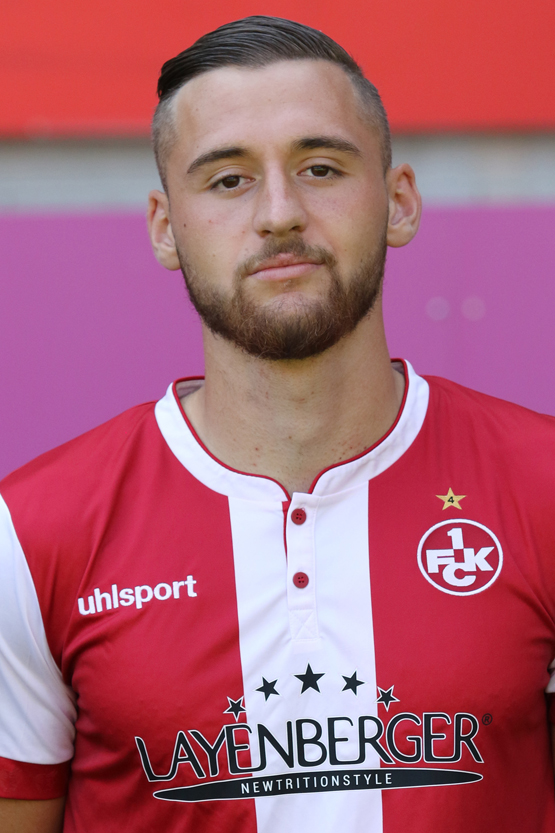
- Gottwalt with 1. FC Kaiserslautern in 2018

Personal information
- Full name: Lukas Erhan Eberhard Gottwalt
- Date of birth: 16 September 1997 (age 29)
- Place of birth: Frankfurt, Germany
- Height: 1.92 m (6 ft 4 in)
- Position: Centre-back

Team information
- Current team: FSV Frankfurt
- Number: 13

Senior career*
Years	Team	Apps	(Gls)
–2016	Boluspor	1	(0)
2016–2017	SG Bruchköbel	26	(7)
2017–2019	1. FC Kaiserslautern II	51	(3)
2018–2021	1. FC Kaiserslautern	23	(1)
2021–2022	FSV Frankfurt	35	(3)
2022–2023	Göztepe	14	(0)
2024	Würzburger Kickers	2	(0)
2024–	FSV Frankfurt	72	(6)
- * Club domestic league appearances and goals as of 24 September 2026

Lukas Erhan Eberhard Gottwalt (born 16 September 1997) is a German professional footballer who plays as a centre-back for FSV Frankfurt.
