= Stipe Vučur =

Austrian footballer

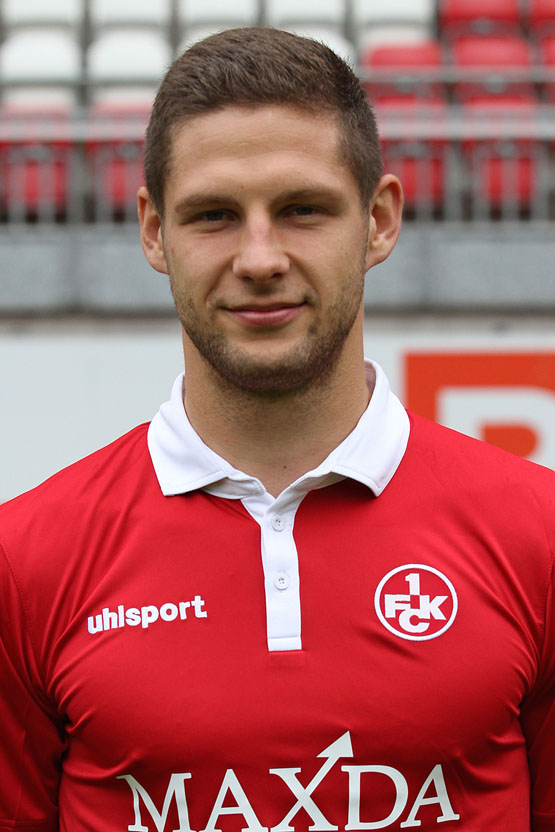
- Vučur with 1. FC Kaiserslautern in 2015

Personal information
- Full name: Stipe Vučur
- Date of birth: 22 May 1992 (age 34)
- Place of birth: Salzburg, Austria
- Height: 1.96 m (6 ft 5 in)
- Position: Centre-back

Youth career
- 1997–2002: 1. Salzburger SK 1919
- 2002–2010: Red Bull Salzburg

Senior career*
Years	Team	Apps	(Gls)
2010–2011	Seekirchen	20	(6)
2011	USK Anif	15	(1)
2012–2013	Lustenau	47	(9)
2013–2014	Wacker Innsbruck	32	(4)
2014–2015	Erzgebirge Aue	33	(3)
2015–2018	1. FC Kaiserslautern	84	(7)
2018–2020	Hajduk Split	16	(1)
2020–2021	Hallescher FC	32	(3)
2021	FCSB	2	(0)
2023	Žalgiris	22	(2)
2024	Liepāja	8	(0)
2024–2025	Široki Brijeg	10	(1)
2025	Hapoel Acre	0	(0)
- * Club domestic league appearances and goals as of 17 December 2025

Stipe Vučur (born 22 May 1992) is an Austrian professional footballer who plays as a centre-back.

== Club career ==
=== Austrian Bundesliga ===
On 30 May 2013, Vučur signed a two-year contract with Wacker Innsbruck.

=== Zweite Bundesliga ===
After attracting interest from several Austrian clubs, Vučur signed for 2. Bundesliga side Erzgebirge Aue on 3 June 2014, for an undisclosed fee signing a three-year contract with the German club. He dreamed of one day playing in the Bundesliga.

Vučur signed for 1. FC Kaiserslautern on 4 June 2018 on a three-year contract. He played regularly and was linked with several clubs.

=== Croatia ===
On 27 June 2018, Vučur signed a three-year contract with Hajduk Split. After being lost for 2019 with a knee injury he did not extend his contract in Hajduk and left the club in the summer of 2020.

=== Hallescher FC ===
On 20 October 2020, Vučur joined German club Hallescher FC until the end of the 2020–21 season.

=== FCSB ===
On 4 June 2021, FCSB signed a one-year contract with Vucur, with an option to extend for a further year.

=== FK Žalgiris ===
On 8 February 2023, Žalgiris Club announced about the new players.

== Personal life ==
Vučur was born in Salzburg, Austria to Bosnian Croat parents.
