= Yannick Filipović =

German footballer

Personal information
- Date of birth: 23 February 1998 (age 28)
- Place of birth: Mönchengladbach, Germany
- Height: 1.95 m (6 ft 5 in)
- Position: Centre-back

Team information
- Current team: Bonner SC

Youth career
- 2014–2017: Werder Bremen

Senior career*
Years	Team	Apps	(Gls)
2017–2019	1. FC Kaiserslautern II		
2019	Fortuna Köln	3	(0)
2020–2021	FC Wegberg-Beeck	4	(0)
2021–	Bonner SC	1	(0)
- * Club domestic league appearances and goals as of 1 July 2022

Yannick Filipović (born 23 February 1998) is a German footballer who plays as a centre-back for Bonner SC.

A youth product of Werder Bremen, Filipović moved to 1. FC Kaiserslautern II in 2017. After two seasons, in 2019 he joined Fortuna Köln. In 2020, Filipović joined FC Wegberg-Beeck, before moving to Bonner SC.

== Early life ==
Yannick Filipović was born in Mönchengladbach, Germany on 23 February 1998, to a Montenegrin father and a Peruvian mother. On 4 August 2016, Filipovic trained with the first team for the first time.

== Club career ==
In 2020, Filipović was signed by Wegberg-Beeck. At the beginning of 2020, he suffered a meniscus tear, missing the remaining 15 games of the season until the middle of the year. On 25 October 2020, he made his debut against Homberg, winning 1–0.

On 1 July 2021, Filipović joined Bonner SC on a free transfer.

== International career ==
Filipović holds three nationalities, making him eligible to represent Germany, Montenegro or Peru internationally. In 2021 he indicated that he wanted to play for the Peru national team, but pointed out that he has never had contact and does not have Peruvian citizenship.

== Career statistics ==
=== Club ===
As of match played 1 July 2022

Appearances and goals by club, season and competition
Club	Season	League			National Cup (Note: Includes DFB-Pokal)		Total	
Club	Season	Division	Apps	Goals	Apps	Goals	Apps	Goals
1. FC Kaiserslautern II	2017–18	Oberliga Rheinland-Pfalz/Saar			—			
1. FC Kaiserslautern II	2018–19	Oberliga Rheinland-Pfalz/Saar			—			
1. FC Kaiserslautern II	Total							
Fortuna Koln	2019–20	Regionalliga West	3	0	—		3	0
FC Wegberg-Beeck	2020–21	Regionalliga West	4	0	—		4	0
Bonner SC	2021–22	Regionalliga West	1	0	—		1	0
Career total			8	0	0	0	8	0
