= Gino Fechner =

German professional footballer

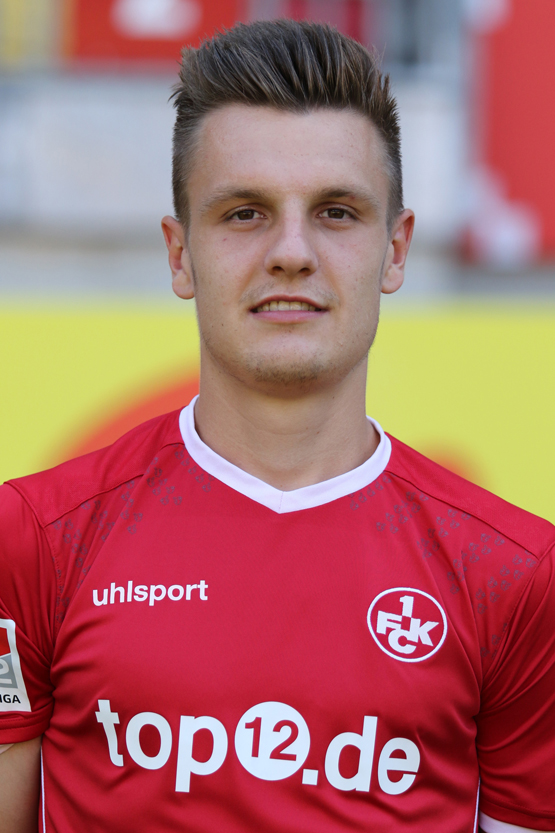
- Fechner with 1. FC Kaiserslautern in August 2017

Personal information
- Date of birth: 5 September 1997 (age 29)
- Place of birth: Bochum, Germany
- Height: 1.88 m (6 ft 2 in)
- Position: Midfielder

Team information
- Current team: Wehen Wiesbaden
- Number: 6

Youth career
- –2004: SV Eintracht Grumme
- 2004–2015: VfL Bochum
- 2015–2016: RB Leipzig

Senior career*
Years	Team	Apps	(Gls)
2015–2017	RB Leipzig II	35	(0)
2016	RB Leipzig	0	(0)
2017–2020	1. FC Kaiserslautern	59	(2)
2020–2021	KFC Uerdingen 05	33	(0)
2021–	Wehen Wiesbaden	135	(1)

International career^{‡}
2014–2015	Germany U18	9	(0)
2015–2016	Germany U19	12	(0)
2016–2017	Germany U20	10	(0)
- * Club domestic league appearances and goals as of 29 May 2026 ‡ National team caps and goals as of 6 August 2017

Gino Fechner (born 5 September 1997) is a German professional footballer who plays as a midfielder for Wehen Wiesbaden. He is the son of former footballer Harry Fechner.

He was a youth international for Germany.
