= Dylan Esmel =

Ivorian professional footballer

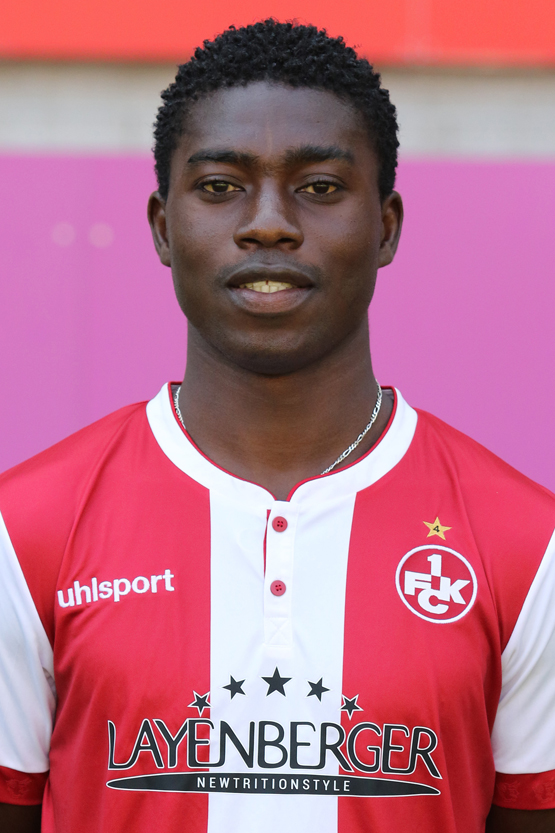
- Esmel with 1. FC Kaiserslautern in 2018

Personal information
- Full name: Dylan Akpess Esmel
- Date of birth: 20 March 1998 (age 28)
- Place of birth: Ahouya-Dabou, Ivory Coast
- Height: 1.81 m (5 ft 11 in)
- Position: Midfielder

Team information
- Current team: TSV Emmelshausen
- Number: 25

Youth career
- 2009–2010: Borussia Dortmund
- 2011–2013: VfL Bochum
- 2013–2017: VfB Stuttgart

Senior career*
Years	Team	Apps	(Gls)
2017–2021	1. FC Kaiserslautern II	26	(9)
2017–2021	1. FC Kaiserslautern	3	(0)
2021–2022	Rot-Weiß Koblenz	11	(2)
2022	Eintracht Trier	0	(0)
2022–2025	TuS Koblenz	80	(30)
2025–	TSV Emmelshausen	29	(9)
- * Club domestic league appearances and goals as of 30 June 2026

Dylan Akpess Esmel (born 20 March 1998) is an Ivorian professional footballer who plays as a midfielder for TSV Emmelshausen.

== Career ==
Esmel made three appearances in the 2. Bundesliga for 1. FC Kaiserslautern. He joined TuS Koblenz of the fifth-tier Oberliga Rheinland-Pfalz/Saar in 2022.
