= FC Rot-Weiß Koblenz =

German football club

- Full name: FC Rot-Weiß Koblenz e.V.
- Founded: 14 June 1947
- Ground: Stadion Oberwerth
- Capacity: 9,500
- Chairman: Pit Arndt
- Head coach: Heiner Backhaus
- League: Oberliga Rheinland-Pfalz/Saar (V)
- 2025–26: Oberliga Rheinland-Pfalz/Saar, 6th of 18
- Website: https://www.fcrotweisskoblenz.de/
Home colours	Away colours	Third colours

FC Rot-Weiß Koblenz, known as TuS Rot-Weiß Koblenz until 2021, is a German association football club from the city of Koblenz, Rhineland-Palatinate. The club's greatest success has been promotion to the tier four Regionalliga Südwest in 2018–19.

The club should not be confused with the better-known TuS Koblenz which has, from 2006 to 2010, played in the 2. Bundesliga and is also based in Koblenz.

== History ==
The club was founded on 14 June 1947 in a merger of local clubs KTSC 1860, T.G. and VfL 06/07. Initially it was named Sportfreunde Rot-Weiß Koblenz, being prohibited by the French occupation authorities to carry the title Turnen (English: Gymnastics) in its name or have a gymnastics department. In 1951, after this ban had been lifted, the club adopted the name, TuS Rot-Weiß Koblenz.

Throughout its history the club has been playing in local amateur leagues until a league championship in the tier seven Bezirksliga Mitte in 2010–11 took it up to the highest league of the Rhineland Football Association, the Rheinlandliga. After finishing in the top four in its first three seasons Koblenz came only tenth in 2014–15 but won the league the following season, 2015–16.

Through this title the club earned promotion to the tier five Oberliga Rheinland-Pfalz/Saar, where it played from 2016 to 2017. In 2019 Rot-Weiß won promotion to the fourth tier Regionalliga Südwest. By the time the season was abandoned because of the COVID-19 pandemic in Germany, they had only earned 5 points in 22 games without a single win, finishing in last place. Because it was decided that there would be no relegation that season, they will play in the same league again in the 2020–21 season.

On 1 July 2021, the football department was split off from the rest of the sports club and was renamed to FC Rot-Weiß Koblenz.

=== Current squad ===
As of 23 September 2021

Note: Flags indicate national team as defined under FIFA eligibility rules; some limited exceptions apply. Players may hold more than one non-FIFA nationality.

No.	Pos.	Nation	Player
1	GK	GER	Carl Leonhard
3	DF	GER	Alem Koljic
4	DF	GER	Maurice Buckesfeld
5	DF	MNE	Miroslav Kovačević
6	MF	GRE	Iosif Maroudis
7	FW	GER	Danny Breitfelder
8	DF	GER	Christopher Spang
9	FW	GER	Osman Atilgan
10	MF	FRA	Quentin Fouley
11	FW	GER	Ali Ceylan
13	MF	GER	Johannes Bender
15	DF	GER	Tim Brdaric

No.	Pos.	Nation	Player
17	DF	GUI	Marius Samoura
18	MF	DOM	Alexis Weidenbach
19	FW	GER	Felix Käfferbitz
20	FW	GER	Nils Fischer
21	MF	GER	Jakob Lemmer (on loan from Kickers Offenbach)
22	DF	USA	Dominic Duncan
23	DF	EGY	Rhami Ghandour
25	FW	CIV	Dylan Esmel
26	MF	GER	Marko Stojanovic
27	MF	GER	Shamsu Mansaray
29	DF	GER	Arthur Ekallé

== Honours ==
The club's honours:

- Rheinlandliga
  - Champions: 2015–16
- Bezirksliga Mitte
  - Champions: 2010–11
- Rhineland Cup
  - Champions: 2018, 2021, 2023

== Recent seasons ==
The recent season-by-season performance of the club:

Season	Division	Tier	Position
2003–04	Bezirksliga Mitte	VI	12th
2004–05	Bezirksliga Mitte	VI	10th
2005–06	Bezirksliga Mitte	VI	6th
2006–07	Bezirksliga Mitte	VI	8th
2007–08	Bezirksliga Mitte	VI	7th
2008–09	Bezirksliga Mitte	VII	5th
2009–10	Bezirksliga Mitte	VII	5th
2010–11	Bezirksliga Mitte	VII	1st ↑
2011–12	Rheinlandliga	VI	3rd
2012–13	Rheinlandliga	VI	4th
2013–14	Rheinlandliga	VI	3rd
2014–15	Rheinlandliga	VI	10th
2015–16	Rheinlandliga	VI	1st ↑
2016–17	Oberliga Rheinland-Pfalz/Saar	V	5th
2017–18	Oberliga Rheinland-Pfalz/Saar	V	7th
2018–19	Oberliga Rheinland-Pfalz/Saar	V	1st ↑
2019–20	Regionalliga Südwest	IV	18th
2020–21	Regionalliga Südwest	IV	10th
2021–22	Regionalliga Südwest	IV	

- With the introduction of the 3. Liga in 2008 as the new third tier, below the 2. Bundesliga, all leagues below dropped one tier.

Key

↑ Promoted	↓ Relegated
