= Jan-Ole Sievers =

German footballer

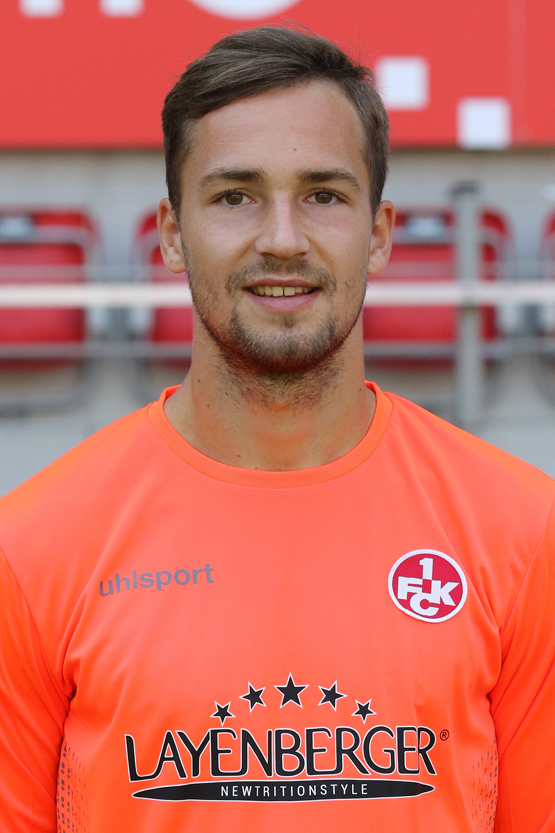
- Sievers with 1. FC Kaiserslautern in 2018

Personal information
- Date of birth: 16 February 1995 (age 31)
- Place of birth: Karlsruhe, Germany
- Height: 1.88 m (6 ft 2 in)
- Position: Goalkeeper

Youth career
- –2011: Karlsruher SC
- 2011–2013: Bolton Wanderers
- 2013–2014: 1. FC Kaiserslautern

Senior career*
Years	Team	Apps	(Gls)
2014–2020	1. FC Kaiserslautern II	35	(0)
2017–2020	1. FC Kaiserslautern	11	(0)
2019	→ FC Gifu (loan)	24	(0)
2021	SV Elversberg	0	(0)
2021–2022	1. FC Lokomotive Leipzig	34	(0)
- * Club domestic league appearances and goals as of 11:05, 19 September 2022 (UTC)

Jan-Ole Sievers (born 16 February 1995) is a German professional footballer who most recently played as a goalkeeper for 1. FC Lokomotive Leipzig.

== Career ==
Sievers made his professional debut for 1. FC Kaiserslautern on 25 October 2017, starting in a home match in the second round of the 2017–18 DFB-Pokal against Bundesliga club VfB Stuttgart.
