= SpVgg Burgbrohl =

- Full name: Sportvereinigung 04/13 Burgbrohl e.V
- Founded: 13 March 1904
- Ground: Rhodius-Stadion
- Chairman: Ralf Dünchel
- Manager: Tomas Remark
- League: Kreisliga B Mayen (IX)
- 2018–19: 7th
Home colours	Away colours

The SpVgg Burgbrohl is a German association football club from the town of Burgbrohl, Rhineland-Palatinate. Apart from football the club also offers other sports like basketball and volleyball.

The club's greatest success has been promotion to the tier five Oberliga Rheinland-Pfalz/Saar in 2013.

== History ==
SpVgg Burgbrohl was formed on 13 March 1904.

The football department of the club was formed in 1973 as SG Brohltal as a cooperation of local clubs SpVgg Burgbrohl, TuS Niederoberweiler and SV Glees and, for the first three decades of its history, has been a non-descript amateur side in local football. After 35 years, in 2008, the SG Brohltal was dissolved and the football team joined SpVgg Burgbrohl because as a Spielgemeinschaft, the team could not legally rise above the level of its local football association and therefore would have been barred from promotion to the Oberliga.

The club earned promotion to the tier-five Rheinlandliga for the first time in 2003, a league it would play in for the next decade. Burgbrohl finished in the upper half of the table every season except in 2009–10, when it came thirteenth. The clubs era in this league culminated in 2013 when it won a championship and promotion to the Oberliga Rheinland-Pfalz/Saar.

In its first season there Burgbrohl finished tenth in the league.

During the 2016–17 season Burgbrohl finished last in the league. The goal difference of the last 17 games of the season was 3:216. At the end of the season the club was considered the worst of all clubs in the first five levels of German football and, following this unfortunate performance, subsequently withdrew its first team from game operations and has since played in the ninth-tier Kreisliga B.

== Honours ==
The club's honours:

=== League ===
- Rheinlandliga
  - Champions: 2013

=== Cup ===
- Rhineland Cup
  - Runners-up: 2010, 2015

== Recent seasons ==
The recent season-by-season performance of the club:

Season	Division	Tier	Position
2003–04	Rheinlandliga	V	7th
2004–05	Rheinlandliga	V	6th
2005–06	Rheinlandliga	V	5th
2006–07	Rheinlandliga	V	6th
2007–08	Rheinlandliga	V	3rd
2008–09	Rheinlandliga	VI	5th
2009–10	Rheinlandliga	VI	13th
2010–11	Rheinlandliga	VI	8th
2011–12	Rheinlandliga	VI	7th
2012–13	Rheinlandliga	VI	1st ↑
2013–14	Oberliga Rheinland-Pfalz/Saar	V	10th
2014–15	Oberliga Rheinland-Pfalz/Saar	V	13th
2015–16	Oberliga Rheinland-Pfalz/Saar	V	14th
2016–17	Oberliga Rheinland-Pfalz/Saar	V	18th ↓
2017–18	Kreisliga B Mayen	IX	11th
2018–19	Kreisliga B Mayen	IX	7th
2019–20	Kreisliga B Mayen	IX	

- With the introduction of the Regionalligas in 1994 and the 3. Liga in 2008 as the new third tier, below the 2. Bundesliga, all leagues below dropped one tier.

=== Key ===
↑ Promoted	↓ Relegated
