= 2013–14 in German football =

Football in Germany
- Season: 2013–14

Men's football
- Bundesliga: Bayern Munich
- 2. Bundesliga: 1. FC Köln
- 3. Liga: 1. FC Heidenheim
- DFB-Pokal: Bayern Munich
- DFL-Supercup: Borussia Dortmund

Women's football
- Frauen-Bundesliga: VfL Wolfsburg
- DFB-Pokal: 1. FFC Frankfurt

The 2013–14 season is the 104th season of competitive football in Germany.

== Promotion and relegation ==
=== Pre Season ===
League	Promoted to League	Relegated from League
Bundesliga	Hertha BSC; Eintracht Braunschweig	SpVgg Greuther Fürth; Fortuna Düsseldorf
2. Bundesliga	Karlsruher SC; Arminia Bielefeld	MSV Duisburg; SSV Jahn Regensburg
3. Liga	RB Leipzig; SV Elversberg; Holstein Kiel	Kickers Offenbach; SV Babelsberg 03; Alemannia Aachen
Bundesliga (women)	BV Cloppenburg (women); TSG 1899 Hoffenheim	SC 07 Bad Neuenahr; FSV Gütersloh 2009
2. Bundesliga (women)	FC Viktoria 1889 Berlin; VfL Bochum; SV 67 Weinberg; TuS Wörrstadt; Wolfsburg II	Holstein Kiel; FFC Oldesloe; 1. FFC Recklinghausen; SV RW Bardenbach; Bad Neuenahr II

=== Post Season ===
League	Promoted to League	Relegated from League
Bundesliga	1. FC Köln; SC Paderborn	1. FC Nürnberg; Eintracht Braunschweig
2. Bundesliga	1. FC Heidenheim; RB Leipzig; SV Darmstadt 98	Dynamo Dresden; Energie Cottbus; Arminia Bielefeld
3. Liga	Mainz 05 II; Sonnenhof Großaspach; Fortuna Köln	SV Elversberg; SV Wacker Burghausen; 1. FC Saarbrücken
Bundesliga (women)	Herforder SV; SC Sand	VfL Sindelfingen; BV Cloppenburg
2. Bundesliga (women)	Alemannia Aachen; TSG 1899 Hoffenheim II; Holstein Kiel; 1. FFC Montabaur; 1. FC Union Berlin	TuS Wörrstadt; FC Viktoria 1889 Berlin; SC 07 Bad Neuenahr; USV Jena II; BW Hohen Neuendorf

== National teams ==
=== Germany national football team ===
==== 2014 FIFA World Cup qualification ====
Germany secured qualification for the 2014 World Cup on 11 October 2013 after defeating Ireland 3–0 in Cologne.

6 September 2013 Group C match 7	Germany	3–0	Austria	Munich
20:45 UTC+2	Klose 33' (yellow card) 80'; Reus (yellow card) 44'; Khedira (yellow card) 59'; Kroos 51'; Müller 88'	Report	Weimann (yellow card) 37'; Kavlak (yellow card) 80'; Pogatetz (yellow card) 81'; Klein (yellow card) 83'	Stadium: Allianz Arena; Attendance: 68,000; Referee: Milorad Mažić (Serbia)

10 September 2013 Group C match 8	Faroe Islands	0–3	Germany	Tórshavn, Faroe Islands
19:45 UTC+1	Justinussen (yellow card) 40'; Gregersen (red card) 73'	Report	Mertesacker 22'; Özil 74' (pen.); Müller 84'	Stadium: Tórsvøllur; Attendance: 4,118; Referee: Gediminas Mažeika (Lithuania)

11 October 2013 Group C match 9	Germany	3–0	Republic of Ireland	Cologne
20:45 UTC+2	Khedira 11' (yellow card) 56'; Schürrle 58'; Özil 90+1'	Report	Stokes (yellow card) 62'	Stadium: RheinEnergieStadion; Attendance: 46,237; Referee: Serge Gumienny (Belgium)

15 October 2013 Group C match 10	Sweden	3–5	Germany	Solna, Sweden
20:45 UTC+2	Hysén 6', 69'; Olsson (yellow card) 29'; Kačaniklić 42'	Report	Schürrle (yellow card) 32' (goal) 57', 66', 76'Özil 45'; Götze 52'; Hummels (yellow card) 64'; Höwedes (yellow card) 78'	Stadium: Friends Arena; Attendance: 49,251; Referee: Willie Collum (Scotland)

==== 2014 FIFA World Cup ====
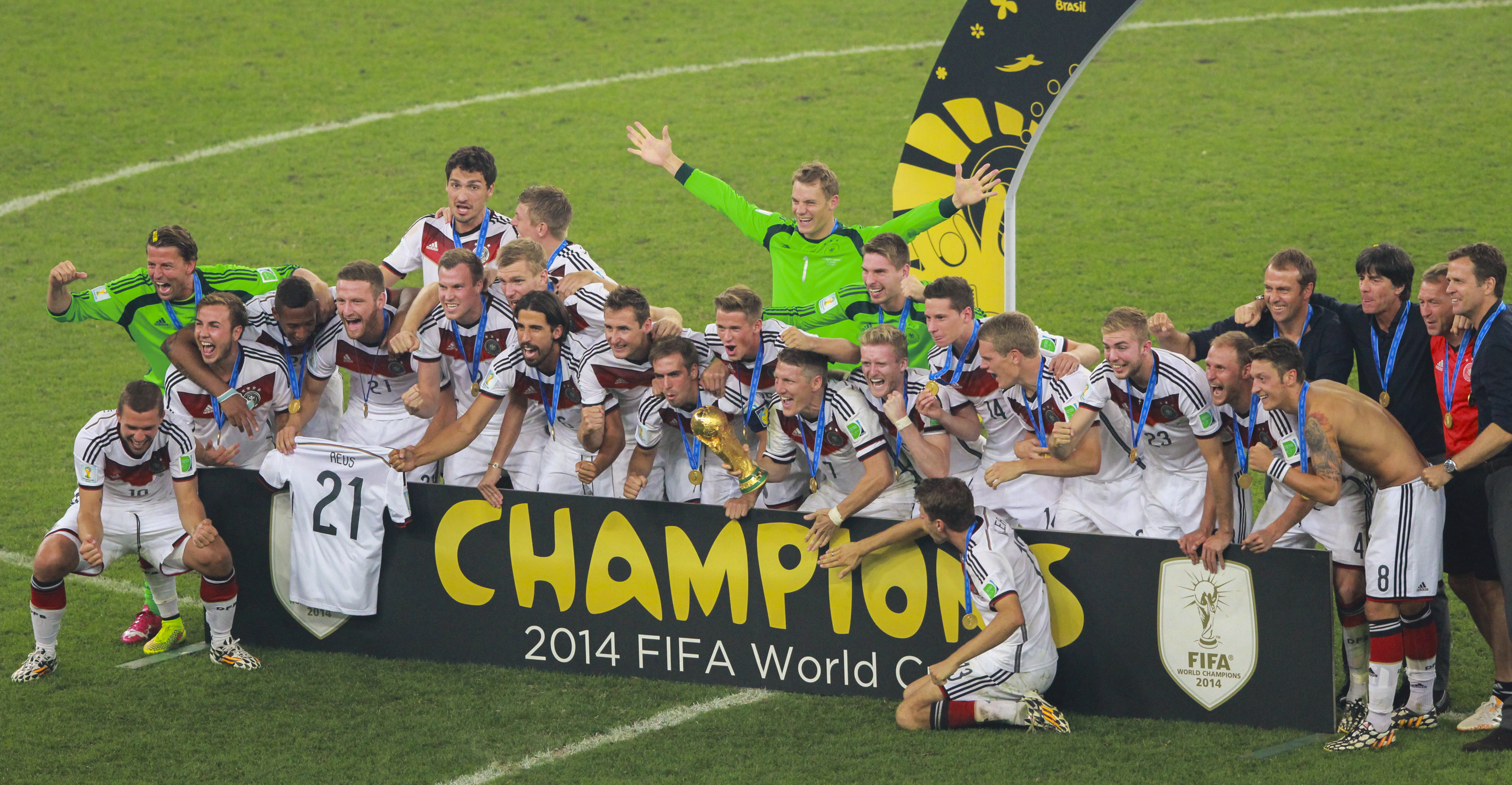
Germany posing with Champions banner after 2014 FIFA World Cup Final

===== Group stage =====
Pos	Team	Pld	W	D	L	GF	GA	GD	Pts	Qualification
1	Germany	3	2	1	0	7	2	+5	7	Advance to knockout stage
2	United States	3	1	1	1	4	4	0	4	Advance to knockout stage
3	Portugal	3	1	1	1	4	7	−3	4	
4	Ghana	3	0	1	2	4	6	−2	1	

Source: FIFA
Rules for classification: Tie-breaking criteria

16 June 2014 Group G	Germany	4–0	Portugal	Salvador, Brazil
13:00 BRT (UTC−03:00)	Müller 12' (pen.), 46', 78'; Hummels 32'	FIFA	Pereira (yellow card) 11'; Pepe (red card) 11'	Stadium: Itaipava Arena Fonte Nova; Attendance: 51,081; Referee: Milorad Mažić (Serbia)

21 June 2014 Group G	Germany	2–2	Ghana	Fortaleza, Brazil
16:00 BRT (UTC−03:00)	Götze 51'; Klose 71'	FIFA	Ayew 54'; Gyan 63'; Muntari (yellow card) 90+4'	Stadium: Castelão; Attendance: 59,621; Referee: Sandro Ricci (Brazil)

26 June 2014 Group G	United States	0–1	Germany	Recife, Brazil
13:00 BRT (UTC−03:00)	Gonzalez (yellow card) 37'; Beckerman (yellow card) 62'	FIFA	Höwedes (yellow card) 11'; Müller 55'	Stadium: Itaipava Arena Pernambuco; Attendance: 41,876; Referee: Ravshan Irmatov (Uzbekistan)

===== Knockout stage =====
30 June 2014 Round of 16	Germany	2–1 (a.e.t.)	Algeria	Porto Alegre, Brazil
17:00 BRT (UTC−03:00)	Schürrle 92'; Lahm (yellow card) 107'; Özil 120+2'	FIFA	Halliche (yellow card) 42'; Djabou 120+4'	Stadium: Estádio Beira-Rio; Referee: Sandro Ricci (Brazil)

4 July 2014 Quarter-finals	France	0–1	Germany	Rio de Janeiro, Brazil
13:00 BRT (UTC−03:00)		FIFA	Hummels 13'; Khedira (yellow card) 54'; Schweinsteiger (yellow card) 80'	Stadium: Estádio do Maracanã; Attendance: 74,240; Referee: Néstor Pitana (Argentina)

8 July 2014 Semi-finals	Brazil	1–7	Germany	Belo Horizonte, Brazil
17:00 BRT (UTC−03:00)	Dante (yellow card) 68'; Oscar 90'	FIFA	Müller 11'; Klose 23'; Kroos 24', 26'; Khedira 29'; Schürrle 69', 79'	Stadium: Estádio Mineirão; Attendance: 58,141; Referee: Marco Rodríguez (Mexico)

13 July 2014 Final	Germany	1–0 (a.e.t.)	Argentina	Rio de Janeiro, Brazil
16:00 BRT (UTC−03:00)	Schweinsteiger (yellow card) 29'; Höwedes (yellow card) 34'; Götze 113'	FIFA	Mascherano (yellow card) 64'; Agüero (yellow card) 64'	Stadium: Estádio do Maracanã; Attendance: 74,738; Referee: Nicola Rizzoli (Italy)

==== Friendly matches ====
14 August 2013	Germany	3–3	Paraguay	Kaiserslautern
14:45	Gündoğan 18'; Müller 31'; Bender 75' (yellow card) 81'	Report	Núñez 9' da Silva (yellow card) 12'; Pittoni 14'; Ayala (yellow card) 43'; Samudio 45+1'; Romero (yellow card) 76'	Stadium: Fritz-Walter-Stadion; Attendance: 47,522; Referee: Ivan Bebek (Croatia)

15 November 2013	Italy	1–1	Germany	Milan, Italy
19:45	Abate 28'; Marchisio (yellow card) 70'; Motta (yellow card) 82'	Report	Hummels 8'; Lahm (yellow card) 54'; Kroos (yellow card) 82'	Stadium: Stadio Giuseppe Meazza; Attendance: 40,000; Referee: Olegário Benquerença (Portugal)

19 November 2013	England	0–1	Germany	London, England
20:00		Report	Mertesacker 39'	Stadium: Wembley Stadium; Attendance: 85,934; Referee: Stéphane Lannoy (France)

5 March 2014	Germany	1–0	Chile	Stuttgart
20:45	Götze 16'	Report	Gutiérrez (yellow card) 21'	Stadium: Mercedes-Benz Arena; Attendance: 54,449; Referee: Mark Clattenburg (England)

13 May 2014	Germany	0–0	Poland	Hamburg
20:45 CEST		Report		Stadium: Imtech Arena; Attendance: 37,569; Referee: David Fernández Borbalán (Spain)

1 June 2014	Germany	2–2	Cameroon	Mönchengladbach
20:30 CEST	Boateng (yellow card) 42'; Müller 66'; Schürrle 71'	Report	Enoh (yellow card) 20'; Song (yellow card) 27'; Eto'o 62'; Choupo-Moting 78'	Stadium: Borussia-Park; Attendance: 41,250; Referee: Damir Skomina (Slovenia)

6 June 2014	Germany	6–1	Armenia	Mainz
20:45 CEST	Schürrle 52'; Podolski 72'; Höwedes 73'; Klose 76'; Götze 82', 89'	Report	Mkhitaryan 69' (pen.); Tumasyan (yellow card) 90+1'	Stadium: Coface Arena; Attendance: 27,000; Referee: Harald Lechner (Austria)

=== Germany women's national football team ===
==== UEFA Women's Euro 2013 ====
11 July 2013 Group B match 1	Germany	0–0	Netherlands	Växjö, Sweden
23:00 CEST	Maier (yellow card) 15'; Keßler (yellow card) 36'; Cramer (yellow card) 73'	Report	Bito (yellow card) 87'	Stadium: Myresjöhus Arena; Attendance: 8,861; Referee: Silvia Spinelli (Italy)

14 July 2013 Group B match 2	Iceland	0–3	Germany	Växjö, Sweden
20:30 CEST	Katrín (yellow card) 72'	Report	Lotzen 24'; Cramer (yellow card) 53'; Okoyino da Mbabi 55', 84'	Stadium: Myresjöhus Arena; Attendance: 4,620; Referee: Kirsi Heikkinen (Finland)

17 July 2013 Group B match 3	Germany	0–1	Norway	Kalmar, Sweden
18:00 CEST		Report	Ims (yellow card) 31'; Isaksen 45+1'	Stadium: Guldfågeln Arena; Attendance: 10,346; Referee: Esther Staubli (Switzerland)

21 July 2013 Quarterfinals	Italy	0–1	Germany	Växjö, Sweden
18:00 CEST	Tuttino (yellow card) 27'; Parisi (yellow card) 39'; Salvai (yellow card) 63'; Stracchi (yellow card) 87'; Di Criscio (yellow card) 90+1'	Report	Laudehr 26'	Stadium: Myresjöhus Arena; Attendance: 9,265; Referee: Katalin Kulcsár (Hungary)

24 July 2013 Semifinals	Sweden	0–1	Germany	Gothenburg, Sweden
20:30 CEST	Fischer (yellow card) 5'	Report	Marozsán 33'; Laudehr (yellow card) 43'	Stadium: Gamla Ullevi; Attendance: 16,608; Referee: Esther Staubli (Switzerland)

28 July 2013 Final	Germany	1–0	Norway	Solna, Sweden
16:00 CEST	Mittag 49'; Krahn (yellow card) 70'	Report		Stadium: Friends Arena; Attendance: 41,301; Referee: Cristina Dorcioman (Romania)

==== 2015 FIFA Women's World Cup qualification ====
21 September 2013 Group 1 match 1	Germany	9–0	Russia	Cottbus
15:00 CEST	Šašić 22' (pen.); Keßler 25', 85'; Marzsán 26', 38'; Bajramaj 73'; Leuopolz 76'; Goeßling 80'; Schmidt 87'	Report	Savchenkova (yellow card) 48'	Stadium: Stadion der Freundschaft; Attendance: 10,031; Referee: Jana Adámková (Czech Republic)

26 October 2013 Group 1 match 2	Slovenia	0–13	Germany	Koper, Slovenia
15:45	Grad (yellow card) 21'; Niki (yellow card) 23'	Report	Šašić 4' (pen.), 32', 66'; Maier 10'; Mittag 16', 20', 65'; Krahn 19'; Laudehr 42'; Bajramaj 62'; Goeßling 85', 87'; Popp 90+3'	Stadium: Bonifika Stadium; Referee: Amy Rayner (England)

30 October 2013 Group 1 match 3	Germany	4–0	Croatia	Frankfurt
18:00	Šašić 52'; Hercigonja-Moulton 55', 62' (o.g.); Wensing 80'	Report	Žigić (yellow card) 52'	Stadium: Stadion am Bornheimer Hang; Referee: Lina Lehtovaara (Finland)

23 November 2013 Group 1 match 4	Slovakia	0–6	Germany	Žilina, Slovakia
14:00	Fischerová (yellow card) 82'	Report	Keßler 8', 83'; Laudehr (yellow card) 39'; Mittag 57', 65'; Popp 84'; Marozsán 87'	Stadium: Štadión pod Dubňom; Referee: Elia Martinez (Spain)

27 November 2013 Group 1 match 5	Croatia	0–8	Germany	Osijek, Croatia
15:00	Lojna (yellow card) 32'; Joščak (yellow card) 65'	Report	Marozsán 12', 22', 66', 80'; Šašić 13' (yellow card) 45+1'; Mittag 53'; Bajramaj (yellow card) 65'; Popp 72'; Bartusiak 90+1'	Stadium: Stadion Gradski vrt Referee: Yuliya Medvedeva-Keldyusheva (Kazakhstan)

5 April 2014 Group 1 match 6	Republic of Ireland	2–3	Germany	Dublin, Ireland
16:00 CEST	Quinn 3'; De Búrca (yellow card) 68'; Byrne (yellow card) 82'; Roche 89'	Report	Laudehr 65' (pen.); Leupolz (yellow card) 69' (goal) 90+1'; Lotzen 84'	Stadium: Tallaght Stadium; Referee: Carina Vitulano (Italy)

10 April 2014 Group 1 match 7	Germany	4–0	Slovenia	Mannheim, Germany
18:00 CEST	Leupolz 18'; Mittag 21', 67'; Lotzen 63'	Report		Stadium: SAP Arena; Referee: Sandra Bastos (Portugal)

8 May 2014 Group 1 match 8	Germany	9–1	Slovakia	Osnabrück, Germany
17:00 CEST	Alushi 2', 35', 70' (yellow card) 84'; Mittag 24', 80'; Keßler 39'; Marozsán 40'; Leupolz 73'; Laudehr 76'	UEFA	Fischerová (yellow card) 57'; Bíróová 85'	Stadium: Stadion an der Bremer Brücke; Referee: Séverine Zinck (France)

==== Algarve Cup ====
5 March 2014 Group A	Germany	5–0	Iceland	Albufeira, Portugal
16:00	Marozsán 7', 23'; Šašić 45' (pen.); Goeßling 59'; Popp 64'	Report		Stadium: Estádio Municipal; Attendance: 400; Referee: Stéphanie Frappart (France)

7 March 2013 Group A	Germany	1–0	China	Albufeira, Portugal
17:10	Mittag 79'	Report		Stadium: Estádio Municipal; Referee: Sheena Dickson (Canada)

10 March 2013 Group A	Norway	1–3	Germany	Albufeira, Portugal
18:30	Mykjåland 2' (pen.)	Report	Laudehr 12'; Mittag 31'; Marozsán 55'	Stadium: Estádio Municipal; Attendance: 400; Referee: Cristina Dorcioman (Romania)

12 March 2014 Final	Germany	3–0	Japan	Faro, Portugal
14:10	Keßler 46'; Mittag 50'; Marozsán 61'	Report		Stadium: Estádio Algarve; Attendance: 600; Referee: Efthalia Mitsi (Greece)

==== Friendly matches ====
19 June 2014	Canada	1–2	Germany	Vancouver, British Columbia, Canada
19:00 PDT	Schmidt 53'	Report	Lotzen 29'; Laudehr 65' (pen.)	Stadium: BC Place; Attendance: 15,618; Referee: Margaret Domka (United States)

== League season ==
=== Men ===
==== Bundesliga ====
===== Bundesliga review =====
The 2013–14 Bundesliga season started on 9 August 2013. After the first round of matches, Hertha BSC was in first place and Eintracht Frankfurt was in 18th place. After 17 rounds, the season reached its halfway mark. Bayern Munich were in first place seven points ahead of second place Bayer Leverkusen. 1. FC Nürnberg and Eintracht Braunschweig were in the automatic relegation spots with 11 points each. Bayern Munich clinched their 24th championship after the 27th round of matches when they led second place Borussia Dortmund by 25 points. The final matches of the season were played on 10 May 2014 A 1–4 defeat to Schalke 04 confirmed relegation for Nürnberg on the final day of the season. Eintracht Braunschweig were relegated after a 1–3 loss to 1899 Hoffenheim on the final day. Despite losing 2–3 to FSV Mainz 05 on the final day, Hamburger SV still have a chance of remaining in the Bundesliga when they face SpVgg Greuther Fürth in the relegation play-offs. VfL Wolfsburg's defeat of Borussia Mönchengladbach secured a spot for the Wolves in the 2014–15 UEFA Europa League group stage. Gladbach's defeat meant they would be placed in the 2014–15 UEFA Europa League play-off round. Mainz will be competing in the 2014–15 UEFA Europa League third qualifying round due to their victory over Hamburg. Bundesliga champions Bayern Munich, runners-up Borussia Dortmund, and third placed Schalke 04 will all enter the 2014–15 UEFA Champions League group stage. Bayer Leverksuen, who finished in fourth place, will enter the 2014–15 UEFA Champions League play-off round. The first leg of the relegation play-offs between 16th placed Hamburg and Greuther Fürth who placed 3rd in the 2. Bundesliga was played on 15 May. It ended as a goalless draw. The second leg was played on 18 May. Greuther Fürth hosted Hamburg in the second leg of the play-off. Pierre-Michel Lasogga scored the first goal of the match to give Hamburg a 1–0 lead. Stephan Fürstner scored for Fürth to make the score 1–1. The aggregate score over the two legs was 1–1. Hamburg remained in the Bundesliga thanks to the away goals rule.

===== Bundesliga standings =====
Pos	Team	Pld	W	D	L	GF	GA	GD	Pts	Qualification or relegation
1	Bayern Munich (C)	34	29	3	2	94	23	+71	90	Qualification for the Champions League group stage
2	Borussia Dortmund	34	22	5	7	80	38	+42	71	Qualification for the Champions League group stage
3	Schalke 04	34	19	7	8	63	43	+20	64	Qualification for the Champions League group stage
4	Bayer Leverkusen	34	19	4	11	60	41	+19	61	Qualification for the Champions League play-off round
5	VfL Wolfsburg	34	18	6	10	63	50	+13	60	Qualification for the Europa League group stage (Note: The 2013–14 DFB-Pokal finalists (Borussia Dortmund and Bayern Munich) qualified for the UEFA Champions League, thus the three Europa League places were distributed through league positions.)
6	Borussia Mönchengladbach	34	16	7	11	59	43	+16	55	Qualification for the Europa League play-off round
7	Mainz 05	34	16	5	13	52	54	−2	53	Qualification for the Europa League third qualifying round
8	FC Augsburg	34	15	7	12	47	47	0	52	
9	1899 Hoffenheim	34	11	11	12	72	70	+2	44	
10	Hannover 96	34	12	6	16	46	59	−13	42	
11	Hertha BSC	34	11	8	15	40	48	−8	41	
12	Werder Bremen	34	10	9	15	42	66	−24	39	
13	Eintracht Frankfurt	34	9	9	16	40	57	−17	36	
14	SC Freiburg	34	9	9	16	43	61	−18	36	
15	VfB Stuttgart	34	8	8	18	49	62	−13	32	
16	Hamburger SV (O)	34	7	6	21	51	75	−24	27	Qualification for the relegation play-offs
17	1. FC Nürnberg (R)	34	5	11	18	37	70	−33	26	Relegation to 2. Bundesliga
18	Eintracht Braunschweig (R)	34	6	7	21	29	60	−31	25	Relegation to 2. Bundesliga

Source: DFB
Rules for classification: 1) points; 2) goal difference; 3) number of goals scored.
(C) Champions; (O) Play-off winners; (R) Relegated

==== 2. Bundesliga ====
Pos	Team	Pld	W	D	L	GF	GA	GD	Pts	Promotion, qualification or relegation
1	1. FC Köln (C, P)	34	19	11	4	53	20	+33	68	Promotion to Bundesliga
2	SC Paderborn (P)	34	18	8	8	63	48	+15	62	Promotion to Bundesliga
3	Greuther Fürth	34	17	9	8	64	38	+26	60	Qualification for promotion play-offs
4	1. FC Kaiserslautern	34	15	9	10	55	39	+16	54	
5	Karlsruher SC	34	12	14	8	47	34	+13	50	
6	Fortuna Düsseldorf	34	13	11	10	45	44	+1	50	
7	1860 Munich	34	13	9	12	38	41	−3	48	
8	FC St. Pauli	34	13	9	12	44	49	−5	48	
9	Union Berlin	34	11	11	12	48	47	+1	44	
10	FC Ingolstadt	34	11	11	12	34	33	+1	44	
11	VfR Aalen	34	11	11	12	36	39	−3	44	
12	SV Sandhausen	34	12	8	14	29	35	−6	44	
13	FSV Frankfurt	34	11	8	15	46	51	−5	41	
14	Erzgebirge Aue	34	11	8	15	42	54	−12	41	
15	VfL Bochum	34	11	7	16	30	43	−13	40	
16	Arminia Bielefeld (R)	34	9	8	17	40	58	−18	35	Qualification for relegation play-offs
17	Dynamo Dresden (R)	34	5	17	12	36	53	−17	32	Relegation to 3. Liga
18	Energie Cottbus (R)	34	6	7	21	35	59	−24	25	Relegation to 3. Liga

Source: kicker.de
Rules for classification: 1) points; 2) goal difference; 3) number of goals scored.
(C) Champions; (P) Promoted; (R) Relegated

==== 3. Liga ====
Pos	Team	Pld	W	D	L	GF	GA	GD	Pts	Promotion, qualification or relegation
1	1. FC Heidenheim (C, P)	38	23	10	5	59	25	+34	79	Promotion to 2. Bundesliga and qualification for DFB-Pokal
2	RB Leipzig (P)	38	24	7	7	65	34	+31	79	Promotion to 2. Bundesliga and qualification for DFB-Pokal
3	Darmstadt 98 (O, P)	38	21	9	8	58	29	+29	72	Qualification to promotion play-offs and DFB-Pokal
4	Wehen Wiesbaden	38	15	11	12	43	44	−1	56	Qualification for DFB-Pokal
5	VfL Osnabrück	38	15	10	13	50	39	+11	55	
6	Preußen Münster	38	13	14	11	55	50	+5	53	
7	MSV Duisburg	38	13	13	12	43	43	0	52	
8	Stuttgarter Kickers	38	13	12	13	45	46	−1	51	
9	Hallescher FC	38	14	9	15	50	55	−5	51	
10	Rot-Weiß Erfurt	38	14	8	16	53	49	+4	50	
11	Jahn Regensburg	38	12	13	13	51	51	0	49	
12	Chemnitzer FC	38	12	13	13	43	46	−3	49	
13	Hansa Rostock	38	13	10	15	45	55	−10	49	
14	Borussia Dortmund II (Note: Reserve teams are ineligible for promotion or DFB-Pokal qualification.)	38	12	10	16	47	55	−8	46	
15	VfB Stuttgart II	38	12	10	16	45	54	−9	46	
16	Holstein Kiel	38	10	15	13	42	38	+4	45	
17	SpVgg Unterhaching	38	11	10	17	50	65	−15	43	
18	SV Elversberg (R)	38	10	10	18	32	54	−22	40	Relegation to Regionalliga
19	Wacker Burghausen (R)	38	9	10	19	39	58	−19	37	Relegation to Regionalliga
20	1. FC Saarbrücken (R)	38	8	8	22	38	63	−25	32	Relegation to Regionalliga

Source: kicker.de
Rules for classification: 1) points; 2) goal difference; 3) number of goals scored.
(C) Champions; (O) Play-off winners; (P) Promoted; (R) Relegated

=== Women ===
==== Bundesliga ====
===== Standings =====
Pos	Team	Pld	W	D	L	GF	GA	GD	Pts	Qualification or relegation
1	VfL Wolfsburg (C)	22	17	4	1	68	16	+52	55	2014–15 UEFA Champions League Round of 32
2	1. FFC Frankfurt	22	16	5	1	80	15	+65	53	2014–15 UEFA Champions League Round of 32
3	1. FFC Turbine Potsdam	22	15	4	3	64	20	+44	49	
4	FC Bayern Munich	22	11	6	5	49	27	+22	39	
5	FF USV Jena	22	8	7	7	36	32	+4	31	
6	SGS Essen	22	8	3	11	37	42	−5	27	
7	Bayer 04 Leverkusen	22	7	5	10	44	38	+6	26	
8	SC Freiburg	22	7	4	11	39	42	−3	25	
9	TSG 1899 Hoffenheim	22	6	5	11	39	61	−22	23	
10	MSV Duisburg	22	6	4	12	27	45	−18	22	
11	BV Cloppenburg (R)	22	4	5	13	34	60	−26	17	Relegation to 2014–15 2. Bundesliga
12	VfL Sindelfingen (R)	22	0	2	20	4	123	−119	2	Relegation to 2014–15 2. Bundesliga

Updated to match(es) played on 8 June 2014. Source: kicker.de
Rules for classification: 1) points; 2) goal difference; 3) number of goals scored.
(C) Champions; (R) Relegated

==== 2. Bundesliga ====
===== North standings =====
Pos	Team	Pld	W	D	L	GF	GA	GD	Pts	Qualification or relegation
1	Turbine Potsdam II (C)	22	16	3	3	62	26	+36	51	
2	Herforder SV (P)	22	14	5	3	54	18	+36	47	Promotion to 2014–15 Bundesliga (Note: Turbine Potsdam II were not eligible for promotion to the Bundesliga, so Herforder SV were promoted.)
3	Werder Bremen	22	11	1	10	60	38	+22	34	
4	SV Meppen	22	10	4	8	36	32	+4	34	
5	FSV Gütersloh 2009	22	9	6	7	43	38	+5	33	
6	VfL Wolfsburg II	22	9	5	8	29	27	+2	32	
7	1. FC Lübars	22	7	5	10	34	32	+2	26	
8	Magdeburger FFC	22	6	8	8	30	42	−12	26	
9	FFV Leipzig	22	7	4	11	37	51	−14	25	
10	Blau-Weiß Hohen Neuendorf (R)	22	7	4	11	24	54	−30	25	Qualification for the relegation play-off
11	FF USV Jena II (R)	22	7	1	14	24	49	−25	22	Relegation to 2014–15 Regionalliga
12	FC Viktoria 1889 Berlin (R)	22	3	6	13	14	40	−26	15	Relegation to 2014–15 Regionalliga

Updated to match(es) played on 1 June 2014. Source: Soccerway
Rules for classification: 1) points; 2) goal difference; 3) number of goals scored.
(C) Champions; (P) Promoted; (R) Relegated

===== South standings =====
Pos	Team	Pld	W	D	L	GF	GA	GD	Pts	Qualification or relegation
1	SC Sand (C)	22	21	1	0	89	12	+77	64	Promotion to 2014–15 Bundesliga
2	1. FC Köln	22	17	2	3	67	22	+45	53	
3	1. FC Saarbrücken	22	14	2	6	57	24	+33	44	
4	FFC Frankfurt II	22	12	1	9	42	36	+6	37	
5	TSV Crailsheim	22	11	3	8	46	39	+7	36	
6	VfL Bochum	22	10	3	9	37	29	+8	33	
7	1. FFC 08 Niederkirchen	22	9	3	10	47	51	−4	30	
8	Bayern Munich II	22	7	7	8	31	30	+1	28	
9	SV 67 Weinberg	22	8	2	12	45	48	−3	26	
10	ETSV Würzburg	22	5	5	12	27	51	−24	20	Qualification for the relegation play-off
11	SC 07 Bad Neuenahr (R)	22	1	3	18	14	68	−54	6	Relegation to 2014–15 Regionalliga
12	TuS Wörrstadt (R)	22	0	2	20	5	97	−92	2	Relegation to 2014–15 Regionalliga

Updated to match(es) played on 1 June 2014. Source: Soccerway
Rules for classification: 1) points; 2) goal difference; 3) number of goals scored.
(C) Champions; (R) Relegated

== DFB–Pokal ==
The 2013–14 DFB-Pokal had sixty-four teams participate in the competition. Participants included all clubs from the 2012–13 Bundesliga and 2012–13 2. Bundesliga, except Dynamo Dresden who were banned from this season's competition. The best four teams of the 2012–13 3. Liga and twenty-five teams from the twenty-one regional associations completed the entrants to the tournament. The first round matches were played from 2 August to 5 August. SC Wiedenbrück 2000 were the only 4th division club to make it past the first round. They were paired with 2. Bundesliga side SV Sandhausen. Only two matches in the second round were between Bundesliga clubs. The second round matches were played on 24 and 25 September. 1. FC Saarbrücken were the only third division club to make it to the third round. They were drawn against Bundesliga side Borussia Dortmund. The third round matches were played on 3 and 4 December. After the third round, 1. FC Kaiserslautern were the last 2. Bundesliga club in the competition. They were paired with Bayer Leverkusen. The quarter-finals were played on 11 and 12 February. Kaiserslautern beat Leverkusen in the quarter-finals to be the only 2. Bundesliga club in the semi-finals along with three Bundesliga clubs. Title holders Bayern Munich were paired with Kaiserslautern and last season's runners-up Borussia Dortmund were paired with VfL Wolfsburg in the semi-finals. The semi-finals matches were played on 15 and 16 April. Bayern Munich and Borussia Dortmund played each other in the 2014 DFB-Pokal Final on 17 May. After 90 minutes of regulation time, no goals had been scored. Extra time was needed for the first time since 1992 to decide a winner. Goals from Arjen Robben and Thomas Müller during extra time gave Bayern Munich a 2–0 victory. This title, along with the Bundesliga title, completed a domestic double for Bayern.

== German clubs in Europe ==
=== Champions League ===
For the first time, four German clubs made it through the group stage into the Round of 16. Bayern Munich, Bayer Leverkusen, Borussia Dortmund, and Schalke 04 all qualified for the knockout stage.

==== Bayer Leverkusen ====
Bayer Leverkusen finished third in the 2012–13 Bundesliga which led to a berth in the Champions League group stage. The group-stage draw on 29 August 2013 saw Leverkusen placed in Group A along with Manchester United, Real Sociedad and Shakhtar Donetsk. On 17 September 2013, Manchester United defeated Leverkusen 2–4 at Old Trafford. Simon Rolfes and Ömer Toprak scored for Leverkusen. The match on 2 October 2013 saw goals from Rolfes and Jens Hegeler lead to a 2–1 win over Real Sociedad at BayArena. A brace from Stefan Kießling along with goals from Rolfes and Sidney Sam led to a 4–0 win over Shakhtar Donetsk on 23 October 2013 at BayArena. The result on 5 November 2013 was a goalless draw at Donbas Arena against Shakhtar Donetsk. The match at BayArena against Manchester United on 27 November 2013 resulted in a 0–5 loss. A 1–0 win over Real Sociedad due to a goal from Toprak on 10 December 2013 at Anoeta Stadium. This win plus a win by Manchester United over Shakhtar Donetsk led to a second-place finish in Group A and advancement to the Round of 16.

The draw for the Round of 16 took place on 16 December 2013. Bayer Leverkusen were drawn against Paris Saint-Germain. The first leg was played on 18 February 2014 at BayArena and resulted in a 0–5 defeat for Leverkusen. PSG scored four goals before Leverkusen were reduced to ten men in the 59th minute when Emir Spahić received a second yellow card. The second leg was played on 12 March 2014 at Parc des Princes Sam scored for Leverkusen in the sixth minute. PSG later scored two goals resulting in a 1–2 defeat for Leverkusen. The aggregate score of 1–6 saw Bayer Leverkusen eliminated from the competition.

==== Bayern Munich ====
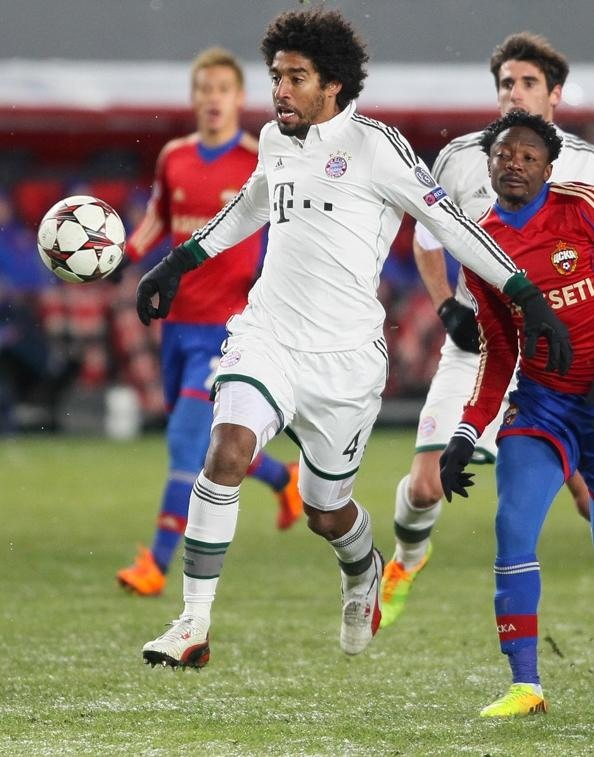
Dante playing for Bayern Munich against CSKA Moscow in November

Bayern Munich won both the 2012–13 Bundesliga and 2012–13 UEFA Champions League and was given a berth in the Champions League group stage. The group-stage draw on 29 August 2013 saw Bayern placed in Group D with CSKA Moscow, Manchester City and Viktoria Plzeň. Bayern's first match took place on 17 September 2013 against CSKA Moscow. Goals from David Alaba, Mario Mandžukić, and Arjen Robben resulted in a 3–0 victory for Bayern at Allianz Arena. The match against Manchester City on 2 October 2013 at Etihad Stadium resulted in a 3–1 win. Franck Ribéry, Thomas Müller and Robben scored the goals for Bayern and Jérôme Boateng earned a red card leaving Bayern with 10 men from the 86th minute. Bayern defeated Viktoria Plzeň 5–0 on 23 October 2013 at Allianz Arena. Bastian Schweinsteiger, Mario Götze and Alaba contributed one goal each while Ribéry scored two goals. On 5 November 2013 Bayern defeated Viktoria Plzeň at Doosan Arena by a score of 1–0. Mandžukić scored the game's only goal. Bayern secured its place in the round of 16 with this win and a win by Manchester City over CSKA Moscow. This win was Bayern's ninth consecutive win in Champions League play which tied a record with Barcelona. Bayern's fifth match of the group stage took place at Luzhniki Stadium on 27 November 2013 was a 3–1 defeat of CSKA Moscow with goals from Robben, Götze, and Müller. This win set a new record undefeated streak in Champions League play at ten games. The final group match for Bayern took place on 10 December 2013 with a 2–3 defeat to Manchester City at Allianz Arena. Bayern's goals were scored by Müller and Götze. The win was not enough for Manchester City to take over first place in Group D from Bayern Munich. This loss ended Bayern's record win streak end at ten games.

The draw for the Round of 16 took place on 16 December 2013. Bayern Munich were drawn against Arsenal. The first leg was played on February 19, 2014 at Emirates Stadium. During the 8th minute, Manuel Neuer stopped a penalty kick from Arsenal's Mesut Özil. Wojciech Szczęsny was sent-off in the 37th minute after taking down Arjen Robben in the penalty area. David Alaba missed the penalty kick that followed. A goal scored by Toni Kroos in the 54th minute and one scored by Thomas Müller in the 88th minute gave Bayern a 2–0 victory. The second leg was played on 11 March 2014 at Allianz Arena and ended as a 1–1 draw. Schweinsteiger scored a goal in the 54th minute to give Bayern the lead before Lukas Podolski tied the game in the 57th minute. Bayern Munich advanced with a 3–1 aggregate score.

The draw for the quarter-finals took place on 21 March 2014. Bayern Munich were drawn against Manchester United F.C. The first leg was played on 1 April 2014 at Old Trafford. Nemanja Vidić scored for United in the 58th minute. Bastian Schweinsteiger scored for Bayern in the 66th minute. The game ended as a 1–1 draw. The second leg was played at the Allianz Arena on 9 April 2014. Patrice Evra of Manchester United scored the first goal of the match in the 57th minute. This lead lasted for 22 seconds before Mandžukić scored Bayern's first goal. Müller and Robben also scored for Bayern resulting in a 3–1 victory. An aggregate score of 4–2 saw Bayern advance to the semi-finals.

The draw for the semi-finals took place on 11 April 2014. Bayern were drawn against Real Madrid C.F. The first leg was played at Santiago Bernabéu Stadium on 23 April 2014 and resulted in a 0–1 defeat for Bayern Munich due to a goal in the 19th minute from Karim Benzema. The second leg at the Allianz Arena on 29 April 2014 was a 0–4 defeat for Bayern. Sergio Ramos and Cristiano Ronaldo both scored two goals for Real Madrid. The aggregate score of 0–5 saw Bayern eliminated from the competition.

==== Borussia Dortmund ====
Borussia Dortmund finished as runners-up in the 2012–13 Bundesliga which earned a berth in the Champions League group stage. The group-stage draw on 29 August 2013 saw Dortmund placed in Group F with Arsenal, Marseille and Napoli. Dortmund opened its campaign with a 1–2 loss to Napoli on 18 September 2013 at Stadio San Paolo. Roman Weidenfeller earned a red card in stoppage time of the first half leaving Dortmund a man short for the second half of the game. Dortmand got its first win of the group stage on 1 October 2013 against Marseille at Signal Iduna Park by a score of 3–0. Manager Jürgen Klopp was banned from the sideline after an incident with the fourth official in the first match. Robert Lewandowski scored two goals, including one penalty, and Marco Reus scored the other goal. The win streak continued on 22 October 2013 at Emirates Stadium with a 2–1 win over Arsenal. Henrik Mkhitaryan scored the first goal in the 16th minute and Lewandowski scored the game winner in the 82nd minute. Arsenal defeated Dortmund 0–1 on 6 November 2013 at Signal Iduna Park. Dortmund returned to winning ways on 26 November 2013 against Napoli by winning 3–1 at Signal Iduna Park. Dortmund's goals came from a Reus penalty, as well as goals from Jakub Błaszczykowski and Pierre-Emerick Aubameyang. The final matchday saw Dortmund face Marseille on 11 December 2013 at Stade Vélodrome. Dortmund won the match 2–1 due to goals from Lewandowski and Kevin Großkreutz. This win moved Dortmund to first place in the group.

The draw for the Round of 16 took place on 16 December 2013. Borussia Dortmund were drawn against Zenit Saint Petersburg. The first leg played on 25 February 2014 at Petrovsky Stadium was won by Dortmund 4–2. Mkhitaryan scored in the fourth minute, Reus scored in the fifth minute and Lewandowski scored in the 61st and 71st minutes. The second leg was played on 19 March 2014 at Signal Iduna Park. Zenit won the match 2–1. Sebastian Kehl's goal in the 38th minute was the only one scored for Dortmund. Dortmund advanced to the quarter-finals due to an aggregate score of 5–4.

The draw for the quarter-finals took place on 21 March 2014 and saw Dortmund drawn against Real Madrid. The first leg was played at Santiago Bernabéu Stadium on 2 April 2014. Real Madrid won the match 3–0 due to goals from Gareth Bale, Isco, and Cristiano Ronaldo. Dortmund won the second leg 2–0 on 8 April 2014 at Signal Iduna Park due to two goals from Reus. Despite the victory, the aggregate score of 2–3 saw Real Madrid advance instead of Borussia Dortmund.

==== Schalke 04 ====
Schalke 04 finished in fourth place in the 2012–13 Bundesliga, which earned them a berth in the Champions League play-off round. The draw for the play-off round took place on 9 August 2013 and saw Schalke paired with Metalist Kharkiv. On 14 August 2013, however, Metalist were banned from UEFA competition. PAOK were chosen to replace Metalist in the play-off round and face Schalke. The first leg tie was played on 21 August 2013 at Veltins-Arena. It ended as a 1–1 draw with Jefferson Farfán scoring for Schalke. The second leg was played at Toumba Stadium on 27 August 2013 resulting in a 3–2 win for Schalke despite a red card for Jermaine Jones in the 64th minute. Julian Draxler scored one goal and Ádám Szalai scored two goals including the game winner which was scored in the 90th minute. The aggregate score of 4–3 saw Schalke advance to the group stage.

The draw for the group stage took place on 29 August 2013 and resulted in Schalke drawn into Group E along with Chelsea, Basel, and Steaua București. Schalke's first group stage match was on 18 September 2013 at Veltins-Arena against Steaua București. Schalke won the match 3–0 due to goals from Atsuto Uchida, Kevin-Prince Boateng, and Julian Draxler. On 1 October 2013, Schalke defeated Basel 1–0 at St. Jakob-Park due to a goal from Draxler. The first loss in the group came on 22 October 2013 to Chelsea at Veltins-Arena by a score of 0–3. Another 0–3 loss to Chelsea came on 6 November 2013 at Stamford Bridge. The winless streak continued on 26 November 2013 with a goalless draw to Steaua București at Arena Națională. The final group match was played on 11 December 2013 at Veltins-Arena against Basel. Two second half goals scored by Draxler and Joël Matip gave Schalke a 2–0 win over a Basel team reduced to ten men after a 31st minute red card for Ivan Ivanov. This win put Schalke two points above Basel in second place in the group therefore advancing to the round of 16.

The draw for the Round of 16 took place on 16 December 2013. Schalke 04 were drawn against Real Madrid. The first leg was played on 26 February 2014 at Veltins-Arena. Real Madrid won the match 6–1 with Schalke's only goal coming from Klaas-Jan Huntelaar. The second leg was played on 18 March 2014 at Santiago Bernabéu Stadium. Tim Hoogland scored for Schalke in the 31st minute, however Real Madrid won the match 3–1. The aggregate score of 2–9 saw Schalke eliminated from the competition.

=== Europa League ===
Three German clubs participated in the 2013–14 UEFA Europa League. They were Eintracht Frankfurt, SC Freiburg, and VfB Stuttgart. Stuttgart was eliminated from the competition in the play-off round. Freiburg was eliminated after finishing third in their group during the group stage. Eintracht Frankfurt was eliminated the round of 32.

==== Eintracht Frankfurt ====
Eintracht Frankfurt finished 6th in the 2012–13 Bundesliga which earned a berth in the 2013–14 UEFA Europa League play-off round. The draw for the play-off round took place on 9 August 2013 and resulted in Frankfurt being drawn against Qarabağ FK. The first leg took place on 22 August 2013 at Tofiq Bahramov Stadium. Frankfurt won the match 2–0 with both goals scored by Alexander Meier. The second leg was won by Frankfurt 2–1 on 29 August 2013 at Commerzbank-Arena. Meier and Takashi Inui both scored on goal in the match. The aggregate score of 4–1 moved Frankfurt on to the group stage.

The group-stage draw took place on 30 August 2013 and placed Frankfurt in Group F with APOEL, Bordeaux and Maccabi Tel Aviv. Frankfurt opened their group stage against Bordeaux on 19 September 2013 at Commerzbank-Arena. Goals from Václav Kadlec, Marco Russ and Constant Djakpa resulted in a 3–0 win for Frankfurt. Bordeaux were reduced to ten men in the 62nd minute when Lucas Orban received a red card, however Frankfurt did not extend their lead. On 3 October 2013, Frankfurt defeated APOEL 3–0 at GSP Stadium. The match's goals were scored by Srđan Lakić and Sebastian Jung along with an own goal from Nektarios Alexandrou. The win streak continued on 24 October 2013 against Maccabi Tel Aviv at Commerzbank-Arena. Kadlec scored in the 12th minute. Maccabi Tel Aviv was reduced to ten men after a red card for Tal Ben Haim in the 34th minute. Meier added another goal in the 53rd minute. The only loss of the group stage came on 7 November 2013 against Maccabi Tel Aviv at Bloomfield Stadium. Goals from Lakić and Meier were not enough as Frankfurt were defeated 2–4. The next game against Bordeaux on 28 November 2013 at Stade Chaban-Delmas was won by Frankfurt 1–0. The match's only goal was scored by Martin Lanig. This win and a draw by Maccabi Tel Aviv against APOEL made Frankfurt group winners with one match remaining. Frankfurt wrapped up the group stage with another win over APOEL on 12 December 2013 at Commerzbank-Arena. Goals from Stephan Schröck and Constant Djakpa led to a 2–0 victory for Frankfurt. The first-place finish in the group stage allowed Frankfurt to move on to the round of 32.

The draw for the Round of 32 took place on 16 December 2013. Eintracht Frankfurt were drawn against Porto. The first leg was played on 20 February 2014 at Estádio do Dragão. After trailing 0–2, a goal from Joselu in the 72nd minute and an own goal from Alex Sandro finished the match a 2–2 draw. The second leg was played on 27 February 2014 at Commerzbank-Arena. The match ended as a 3–3 draw. Stefan Aigner contributed one goal for Frankfurt and Meier scored the other two. Frankfurt were eliminated due to the away goals rule due to Porto having three away goals to Frankfurt's two.

==== SC Freiburg ====
SC Freiburg finished 5th in the 2012–13 Bundesliga which earned a berth in the 2013–14 UEFA Europa League group stage. The group-stage draw took place on 30 August 2013 and placed Freiburg in Group H with Estoril, Sevilla, and Slovan Liberec. Freiburg started their group campaign with a 2–2 draw to Slovan Liberec on 19 September 2013 at Mage Solar Stadion. Julian Schuster scored a penalty kick and Admir Mehmedi scored the other goal for Freiburg. Karim Guédé of Freiburg earned a red card in the 77th minute and Serhiy Rybalka of Slovan Liberec earned a red card in at the 90+1 minute mark. The second matchday on 3 October 2013 ended with a 0–2 defeat to Sevilla at Ramón Sánchez Pizjuán Stadium. Freiburg was reduced to ten men after Diagné Fallou earned a red card in the 62nd minute after which Sevilla scored both goals of the match. Freiburg earned their second point of the group stage via a 1–1 draw with Estoril on 24 October 2013 at Mage Solar Stadion. Vladimír Darida scored the goal for Freiburg in this match. The club remained winless after a goalless draw with Estoril on 7 November 2013 at Estádio António Coimbra da Mota. Two Freiburg players were sent off during the match: Nicolas Höfler in the 87th minute and Guédé in the 89th minute. The only win of the campaign came for Freiburg on 28 November 2013 against Slovan Liberec at Stadion u Nisy. Goals from Matthias Ginter and Francis Coquelin resulted in a 2–1 for Freiburg. The group stage ended with a 0–2 loss to Sevilla on 12 December 2013 at Mage Solar Stadion. This loss combined with a win by Slovan Liberec over Estoril left Freiburg in third place in the group and eliminated from the competition.

==== VfB Stuttgart ====
VfB Stuttgart were runners-up to Champions League qualified Bayern Munich in the 2012–13 DFB-Pokal therefore earning a berth in the 2013–14 UEFA Europa League third qualifying round. The draw for the third qualifying round took place on 19 July 2013 and paired Stuttgart with Botev Plovdiv The first leg was played on 1 August 2013 at Lazur Stadium. The match ended in a 1–1 draw with Vedad Ibišević scoring Stuttgart's goal. The second leg ended as a goalless draw on 8 August 2013 at Comtech Arena. The aggregate score was tied 1–1. Via the away goals rule, Stuttgart advanced to the play-off round.

The play-off draw took place on 9 August 2013 and paired Stuttgart with Rijeka. The first leg was played at Stadion Kantrida on 22 August 2013. Despite a goal by Ibišević in the 89th minute the match ended as a 1–2 defeat for Stuttgart. The second leg saw one goal from Christian Gentner and an own goal from Luka Marić lead to a 2–2 draw on 29 August 2013 at Mercedes-Benz Arena. The aggregate score of 3–4 eliminated Stuttgart from the competition.

== Managerial changes ==
Team	Outgoing manager(s)	Date of vacancy	Incoming manager(s)	Date of appointment
Rot-Weiß Erfurt	(Germany) Alois Schwartz	13 May 2013	(Austria) Walter Kogler	20 June 2013
SSV Jahn Regensburg	(Poland) Franciszek Smuda	14 May 2013	(Germany) Thomas Stratos	11 June 2013
Werder Bremen	(Germany) Thomas Schaaf	15 May 2013	(Germany) Robin Dutt	27 May 2013
1. FC Köln	(Germany) Holger Stanislawski	19 May 2013	(Austria) Peter Stöger	12 June 2013
Fortuna Düsseldorf	(Germany) Norbert Meier	24 May 2013	(Germany) Mike Büskens	3 June 2013
SV Sandhausen	(Germany) Hans-Jürgen Boysen	31 May 2013	(Germany) Alois Schwartz	1 June 2013
VfR Aalen	(Austria) Ralph Hasenhüttl	1 June 2013	(Germany) Stefan Ruthenbeck	14 June 2013
Holstein Kiel	(Germany) Thorsten Gutzeit	4 June 2013	(Germany) Karsten Neitzel	18 June 2013
VfL Osnabrück	(Germany) Alexander Ukrow	22 June 2013	(Germany) Maik Walpurgis	23 June 2013
Bayern Munich	(Germany) Jupp Heynckes	26 June 2013	(Spain) Pep Guardiola	26 June 2013^{2}
Bayer Leverkusen	(Finland) Sami Hyypiä & (Germany) Sascha Lewandowski	30 June 2013	(Finland) Sami Hyypiä	30 June 2013^{3}
FC Ingolstadt 04	(Germany) Tomas Oral	30 June 2013	(Germany) Marco Kurz	1 July 2013
SC Paderborn 07	(Germany) René Müller	30 June 2013	(Germany) André Breitenreiter	1 July 2013
Hansa Rostock	(Germany) Marc Fascher	30 June 2013	(Germany) Andreas Bergmann	1 July 2013
MSV Duisburg	(Germany) Kosta Runjaić	1 July 2013	(Germany) Karsten Baumann	8 July 2013
Dynamo Dresden	(Austria) Peter Pacult	18 August 2013	(Germany) Olaf Janßen	4 September 2013
SV Elversberg	(Germany) Jens Kiefer	22 August 2013	(Germany) Dietmar Hirsch	2 September 2013
VfB Stuttgart	(Germany) Bruno Labbadia	26 August 2013	(Germany) Thomas Schneider	26 August 2013
1. FC Kaiserslautern	(Germany) Franco Foda	29 August 2013	(Germany) Kosta Runjaić	16 September 2013
1860 München	(Germany) Alexander Schmidt	31 August 2013	(Germany) Friedhelm Funkel	7 September 2013
Preußen Münster	(Bulgaria) Pavel Dochev	5 September 2013	(Germany) Ralf Loose	15 September 2013
1. FC Saarbrücken	(Germany) Jürgen Luginger	5 September 2013	(Croatia) Milan Šašić	13 September 2013
Wacker Burghausen	(Bulgaria) Georgi Donkov	5 September 2013	(Germany) Uwe Wolf	13 September 2013
Stuttgarter Kickers	(Italy) Massimo Morales	9 September 2013	(Germany) Horst Steffen	30 September 2013
Hamburger SV	(Germany) Thorsten Fink	17 September 2013	(Netherlands) Bert van Marwijk	22 September 2013
FC Ingolstadt 04	(Germany) Marco Kurz	30 September 2013	(Austria) Ralph Hasenhüttl	4 October 2013
Chemnitzer FC	(Germany) Gerd Schädlich	6 October 2013	(Germany) Karsten Heine	9 October 2013
1. FC Nürnberg	(Germany) Michael Wiesinger	7 October 2013	(Netherlands) Gertjan Verbeek	22 October 2013
SV Wehen Wiesbaden	(Germany) Peter Vollmann	21 October 2013	(Germany) Marc Kienle	28 October 2013
Energie Cottbus	(Germany) Rudi Bommer	5 November 2013	(Germany) Stephan Schmidt	6 November 2013
FC St. Pauli	(Germany) Michael Frontzeck	6 November 2013	(Germany) Roland Vrabec	7 November 2013
Fortuna Düsseldorf	(Germany) Mike Büskens	30 November 2013	(Germany) Lorenz-Günther Köstner	1 January 2014
Hannover 96	(Germany) Mirko Slomka	27 December 2013	(Turkey) Tayfun Korkut	31 December 2013
SpVgg Unterhaching	(Germany) Claus Schromm	4 January 2014	(Germany) Manuel Baum	4 January 2014
Hamburger SV	(Netherlands) Bert van Marwijk	15 February 2014	(Germany) Mirko Slomka	17 February 2014
1. FC Saarbrücken	(Croatia) Milan Šašić	10 February 2014	(Turkey) Fuat Kılıç	12 February 2014
Arminia Bielefeld	(Germany) Stefan Krämer	23 February 2014	(Germany) Norbert Meier	24 February 2014
Energie Cottbus	(Germany) Stephan Schmidt	24 February 2014	(Germany) Jörg Böhme (caretaker)	25 February 2014
VfB Stuttgart	(Germany) Thomas Schneider	9 March 2014	(Netherlands) Huub Stevens	9 March 2014
SpVgg Unterhaching	(Germany) Manuel Baum	20 March 2014	(Germany) Christian Ziege	20 March 2014
Bayer Leverkusen	(Finland) Sami Hyypiä	5 April 2014	(Germany) Sascha Lewandowski	5 April 2014
1860 München	(Germany) Friedhelm Funkel	6 April 2014	(Germany) Markus von Ahlen (caretaker)	6 April 2014
SV Elversberg	(Germany) Dietmar Hirsch	14 April 2014	(Germany) Roland Seitz	14 April 2014
Hansa Rostock	(Germany) Andreas Bergmann	16 April 2014	(Germany) Dirk Lottner	16 April 2014
1. FC Nürnberg	(Netherlands) Gertjan Verbeek	23 April 2014	(Germany) Roger Prinzen	23 April 2014

Notes

1. Announced on 16 January 2013.
2. Announced on 15 May 2013.

== Transfers ==
- List of German football transfers summer 2013
- List of German football transfers winter 2013–14

== Deaths ==
- 19 July 2013 – Bert Trautmann, 89, manager for Preußen Münster and SC Opel Rüsselsheim.
- 2 August 2013 – Kurt Ehrmann, 91, forward for Karlsruher FV, VfB Mühlburg, and 1. FC Pforzheim who earned one cap for Germany.
- 7 September 2013 – Wolfgang Frank, 62, striker for VfB Stuttgart, Eintracht Braunschweig, Borussia Dortmund, and others. He was also manager for 1. FSV Mainz 05, MSV Duisburg, Kickers Offenbach and others.
- 15 March 2014 – Jürgen Kurbjuhn, 73, defender for Hamburger SV and member of 1962 West Germany World Cup squad.
- 4 April 2014 – Klaus Meyer, 76, defender for Eintracht Braunschweig.
- 1 May 2014 – Georg Stollenwerk, 83, midfielder for 1. FC Köln and member of 1958 West Germany World Cup squad.

== Retirements ==
=== Mid-season ===
- Steve Cherundolo, 35, captain for Hannover 96 who won 87 caps for United States retired 19 March 2014.
- Jens Wissing, 26, defender who made three Bundesliga appearances with Borussia Mönchengladbach and eleven 2. Bundesliga appearances for SC Paderborn 07 retired due to an ankle injury.

=== Post-season ===
- Paul Freier, 34, midfielder for VfL Bochum and Bayer Leverkusen who earned 19 caps for Germany.
- Levan Kobiashvili, 36, defender for Hertha BSC, Schalke 04 and SC Freiburg who earned 100 caps for Georgia.
- Markus Krösche, 33, defender and captain for SC Paderborn 07.
- Stefan Kühne, 33, captain for Preußen Münster who also played for FC Carl Zeiss Jena, Holstein Kiel, and 1. FSV Mainz 05.
- Marcel Maltritz, 35, defender/midfielder for VfL Bochum, VfL Wolfsburg, Hamburger SV, and 1. FC Magdeburg.
- Daniel Van Buyten, 36, defender for Bayern Munich and Hamburger SV.
