= 2013–14 3. Liga =

6th season of the 3. Liga

3. Liga
- Season: 2013–14
- Champions: 1. FC Heidenheim
- Promoted: 1. FC Heidenheim; RB Leipzig; SV Darmstadt 98
- Relegated: SV Elversberg; 1. FC Saarbrücken; Wacker Burghausen
- Matches: 380
- Goals: 953 (2.51 per match)
- Top goalscorer: Dominik Stroh-Engel (27 goals)

The 2013–14 3. Liga was the sixth season of the 3. Liga, Germany's third-level football league.

The league consisted of twenty teams: The teams placed fourth through seventeenth of the 2012–13 season, the worst two teams from the 2012–13 2nd Bundesliga, the three promoted teams the 2012–13 Fußball-Regionalliga and the losers of the relegation play-off between the 16th-placed 2nd Bundesliga team and the third-placed 3rd Liga team.

== Teams ==
At the end of the 2012–13 season, Karlsruher SC and Arminia Bielefeld were directly promoted to the 2013–14 2nd Bundesliga. Karlsruhe made an immediate return to the 2nd Bundesliga after being relegated in 2011–12. Bielefeld returned to the 2nd Bundesliga after two seasons in the third tier. The two promoted teams were to be replaced by Jahn Regensburg and SV Sandhausen, who finished in the bottom two places of the 2012–13 2nd Bundesliga table and thus were to be directly relegated. Both Regensburg and Sandhausen were to be relegated after cameo appearances in the 2nd Bundesliga. However, MSV Duisburg were denied a licence for the 2nd Bundesliga (though not the licence for the 3rd Liga) and were relegated. Sandhausen were given the free place in the 2nd Bundesliga.

At the other end of the table, Alemannia Aachen, SV Babelsberg 03 and SV Darmstadt 98 were to be relegated to the 2013–14 Regionalliga; Aachen entered the Regionalliga West. Babelsberg would be going to the Regionalliga North-East and Darmstadt were supposed to be relegated to the Regionalliga South-West. However, Kickers Offenbach were denied the license for the 3rd League and Darmstadt were instead allowed to stay in the 3rd League. Offenbach relegated to the Regionalliga South-West.

The three relegated teams were replaced by the three winners of the 2012–13 Regionalliga promotion playoffs. RB Leipzig from the North-Eastern division and SV Elversberg from the South-Western Division are playing their debut seasons in the 3rd Liga, while Holstein Kiel from the Northern division returned to the national level of football after three seasons in the fourth tier Regionalliga.

A further place in the league was available via a two-legged play-off between third-placed 2012–13 3rd Liga team VfL Osnabrück and 16th-placed 2012–13 2. Bundesliga sides Dynamo Dresden. The tie ended 2–1 on aggregate and saw Dresden remain in the 2nd Bundesliga.

=== Stadiums and locations ===
Location of teams in the 2013–14 3. Liga

Team	Location	Stadium	Stadium capacity
Chemnitzer FC	Chemnitz	Stadion an der Gellertstraße	18,712
SV Darmstadt 98	Darmstadt	Stadion am Böllenfalltor	19,000
Borussia Dortmund II	Dortmund	Stadion Rote Erde	10,000
MSV Duisburg	Duisburg	Schauinsland-Reisen-Arena	31,500
SV Elversberg	Spiesen-Elversberg	Waldstadion	5,305
Hallescher FC	Halle	Erdgas Sportpark	15,057
Hansa Rostock	Rostock	DKB-Arena	29,000
1. FC Heidenheim	Heidenheim	Voith-Arena	13,000
Holstein Kiel	Kiel	Holstein-Stadion	11,386
Jahn Regensburg	Regensburg	Jahnstadion	12,500
VfL Osnabrück	Osnabrück	Osnatel-Arena	16,667
Preußen Münster	Münster	Preußenstadion	15,050
RB Leipzig	Leipzig	Red Bull Arena	44,345
Rot-Weiß Erfurt	Erfurt	Steigerwaldstadion	17,500
1. FC Saarbrücken	Saarbrücken	Ludwigspark	35,303
VfB Stuttgart II	Stuttgart	Gazi-Stadion auf der Waldau	10,100
Stuttgarter Kickers	Stuttgart	Gazi-Stadion auf der Waldau	10,100
SpVgg Unterhaching	Unterhaching	Stadion am Sportpark	15,053
SV Wacker Burghausen	Burghausen	Wacker-Arena	10,000
SV Wehen Wiesbaden	Wiesbaden	BRITA-Arena	12,250

=== Personnel and sponsorships ===
Team	Head coach	Team captain	Kitmaker	Shirt sponsor
Chemnitzer FC	(Germany) Karsten Heine	(Germany) Silvio Bankert	adidas	aetka Communication Center
SV Darmstadt 98	(Germany) Dirk Schuster	(Turkey) Aytac Sulu	Nike	Software AG
Borussia Dortmund II	(United States) David Wagner	(Germany) David Solga	Puma	Evonik
MSV Duisburg	(Germany) Karsten Baumann	(Bosnia and Herzegovina) Branimir Bajić	Nike	Rhein-Power
SV Elversberg	(Germany) Roland Seitz	(Germany) Timo Wenzel	adidas	Bromelain-POS
Hallescher FC	(Germany) Sven Köhler	(Germany) Maik Wagefeld	Reebok	Halplus
Hansa Rostock	(Germany) Dirk Lottner	(Germany) Sebastian Pelzer	Nike	Veolia
1. FC Heidenheim	(Germany) Frank Schmidt	(Germany) Marc Schnatterer	Nike	Hartmann Gruppe
Holstein Kiel	(Germany) Karsten Neitzel	(Poland) Rafael Kazior	adidas	Famila
Jahn Regensburg	(Germany) Thomas Stratos	(Germany) Sebastian Nachreiner	Saller	Händlmaier
VfL Osnabrück	(Germany) Maik Walpurgis	(Germany) Paul Thomik	adidas	Sparkasse Osnabrück
Preußen Münster	(Germany) Ralf Loose	(Germany) Stefan Kühne	Nike	Tuja Zeitarbeit
RB Leipzig	(Germany) Alexander Zorniger	(Germany) Daniel Frahn	adidas	Red Bull
Rot-Weiß Erfurt	(Austria) Walter Kogler	(Germany) Nils Pfingsten-Reddig	Saller	Thüringer Energie AG
1. FC Saarbrücken	(Turkey) Fuat Kilic (Interim)	(Germany) Timo Ochs	Nike	Victor's Residenz-Hotels
VfB Stuttgart II	(Germany) Jürgen Kramny	(Germany) Tobias Rathgeb	Puma	GAZI
Stuttgarter Kickers	(Germany) Horst Steffen	(Italy) Vincenzo Marchese	Umbro	Subaru
SpVgg Unterhaching	(Germany) Christian Ziege	(Germany) Maximilian Welzmüller	adidas	Alpenbauer
Wacker Burghausen	(Germany) Uwe Wolf	(Germany) Marco Holz	Hummel	OMV
SV Wehen Wiesbaden	(Germany) Marc Kienle	(Germany) Nico Herzig	Nike	Brita

=== Managerial changes ===
Team	Outgoing manager	Manner of departure	Date of vacancy	Position in table	Incoming manager	Date of appointment
Rot-Weiß Erfurt	(Germany) Alois Schwartz	Resigned	13 May 2013	Pre-season	(Austria) Walter Kogler	20 June 2013
SSV Jahn Regensburg	(Poland) Franciszek Smuda	Resigned	14 May 2013	Pre-season	(Germany) Thomas Stratos	11 June 2013
Holstein Kiel	(Germany) Thorsten Gutzeit	Resigned	4 June 2013	Pre-season	(Germany) Karsten Neitzel	18 June 2013
VfL Osnabrück	(Germany) Alexander Ukrow	End of tenure as caretaker	22 June 2013	Pre-season	(Germany) Maik Walpurgis	23 June 2013
Hansa Rostock	(Germany) Marc Fascher	End of contract	30 June 2013	Pre-season	(Germany) Andreas Bergmann	1 July 2013
MSV Duisburg	(Germany) Kosta Runjaić	Resigned	1 July 2013	Pre-season	(Germany) Karsten Baumann	8 July 2013
SV Elversberg	(Germany) Jens Kiefer	Resigned	22 August 2013	19th	(Germany) Dietmar Hirsch	2 September 2013
Preußen Münster	(Bulgaria) Pavel Dochev	Sacked	5 September 2013	16th	(Germany) Ralf Loose	15 September 2013
1. FC Saarbrücken	(Germany) Jürgen Luginger	Sacked	5 September 2013	18th	(Croatia) Milan Šašić	13 September 2013
Wacker Burghausen	(Bulgaria) Georgi Donkov	Sacked	5 September 2013	20th	(Germany) Uwe Wolf	13 September 2013
Stuttgarter Kickers	(Italy) Massimo Morales	Sacked	9 September 2013	18th	(Germany) Horst Steffen	30 September 2013
Chemnitzer FC	(Germany) Gerd Schädlich	Resigned	6 October 2013	15th	(Germany) Karsten Heine	9 October 2013
SV Wehen Wiesbaden	(Germany) Peter Vollmann	Mutual consent	21 October 2013	7th	(Germany) Marc Kienle	28 October 2013
SpVgg Unterhaching	(Germany) Claus Schromm	Promoted to Director of Sport	4 January 2014	10th	(Germany) Manuel Baum	4 January 2014
1. FC Saarbrücken	(Croatia) Milan Šašić	Resigned	10 February 2014	20th	(Turkey) Fuat Kılıç	12 February 2014
SpVgg Unterhaching	(Germany) Manuel Baum	Sacked	20 March 2014	18th	(Germany) Christian Ziege	20 March 2014
SV Elversberg	(Germany) Dietmar Hirsch	Sacked	14 April 2014	18th	(Germany) Roland Seitz	14 April 2014
Hansa Rostock	(Germany) Andreas Bergmann	Sacked	16 April 2014	12th	(Germany) Dirk Lottner	16 April 2014

== League table ==
Pos	Team	Pld	W	D	L	GF	GA	GD	Pts	Promotion, qualification or relegation
1	1. FC Heidenheim (C, P)	38	23	10	5	59	25	+34	79	Promotion to 2. Bundesliga and qualification for DFB-Pokal
2	RB Leipzig (P)	38	24	7	7	65	34	+31	79	Promotion to 2. Bundesliga and qualification for DFB-Pokal
3	Darmstadt 98 (O, P)	38	21	9	8	58	29	+29	72	Qualification to promotion play-offs and DFB-Pokal
4	Wehen Wiesbaden	38	15	11	12	43	44	−1	56	Qualification for DFB-Pokal
5	VfL Osnabrück	38	15	10	13	50	39	+11	55	
6	Preußen Münster	38	13	14	11	55	50	+5	53	
7	MSV Duisburg	38	13	13	12	43	43	0	52	
8	Stuttgarter Kickers	38	13	12	13	45	46	−1	51	
9	Hallescher FC	38	14	9	15	50	55	−5	51	
10	Rot-Weiß Erfurt	38	14	8	16	53	49	+4	50	
11	Jahn Regensburg	38	12	13	13	51	51	0	49	
12	Chemnitzer FC	38	12	13	13	43	46	−3	49	
13	Hansa Rostock	38	13	10	15	45	55	−10	49	
14	Borussia Dortmund II (Note: Reserve teams are ineligible for promotion or DFB-Pokal qualification.)	38	12	10	16	47	55	−8	46	
15	VfB Stuttgart II	38	12	10	16	45	54	−9	46	
16	Holstein Kiel	38	10	15	13	42	38	+4	45	
17	SpVgg Unterhaching	38	11	10	17	50	65	−15	43	
18	SV Elversberg (R)	38	10	10	18	32	54	−22	40	Relegation to Regionalliga
19	Wacker Burghausen (R)	38	9	10	19	39	58	−19	37	Relegation to Regionalliga
20	1. FC Saarbrücken (R)	38	8	8	22	38	63	−25	32	Relegation to Regionalliga

Source: kicker.de
Rules for classification: 1) points; 2) goal difference; 3) number of goals scored.
(C) Champions; (O) Play-off winners; (P) Promoted; (R) Relegated

== Results ==
Home \ Away	WBU	CFC	D98	DO2	DUI	SVE	ERF	HFC	FCH	KSV	RBL	PRM	OSN	JRE	ROS	FCS	SKI	ST2	UNT	WEH
Wacker Burghausen	—	1–0	2–1	0–0	0–2	0–1	1–1	1–0	2–2	1–0	1–2	2–4	1–4	2–2	0–1	1–2	2–0	2–2	1–0	1–3
Chemnitzer FC	1–0	—	1–1	2–0	0–0	2–0	4–0	1–1	0–2	2–1	3–1	0–4	0–3	0–3	1–1	2–0	1–0	0–0	0–0	1–2
Darmstadt 98	1–0	1–1	—	3–0	1–0	0–0	2–1	4–1	1–0	1–3	0–1	4–0	0–2	2–1	6–0	1–0	1–0	1–0	3–1	2–2
Borussia Dortmund II	3–1	3–0	1–1	—	2–0	3–0	0–3	4–0	0–3	1–1	3–3	1–1	1–2	1–2	0–1	1–1	1–1	1–0	4–2	1–4
MSV Duisburg	1–1	1–1	0–4	1–2	—	3–0	3–2	1–3	0–1	1–1	2–1	0–1	1–0	2–1	2–0	3–3	1–1	0–0	3–0	0–0
SV Elversberg	1–0	1–1	0–3	0–5	1–0	—	2–0	2–2	1–1	0–0	1–0	2–2	2–2	3–1	1–2	3–1	1–1	0–2	1–1	3–0
Rot-Weiß Erfurt	1–1	1–0	3–0	3–1	1–3	2–0	—	3–0	1–2	0–0	0–2	0–0	3–1	2–3	1–1	0–1	1–2	4–2	2–0	3–0
Hallescher FC	2–4	2–1	1–0	0–0	1–1	2–0	0–2	—	0–1	1–0	0–1	0–0	2–0	4–1	4–3	1–1	1–1	3–2	4–2	1–2
1. FC Heidenheim	1–0	3–0	1–1	4–0	2–2	1–0	2–1	0–0	—	3–0	0–2	2–1	2–0	2–2	2–0	2–1	2–0	0–1	2–0	0–0
Holstein Kiel	2–1	1–1	0–2	0–0	0–1	1–2	1–2	1–0	0–1	—	0–2	3–0	1–1	0–0	2–2	5–1	0–0	3–0	4–0	3–0
RB Leipzig	0–1	2–1	1–0	1–0	1–1	2–0	2–0	2–1	1–1	3–1	—	2–2	1–0	2–0	1–2	5–1	2–1	3–1	2–2	1–0
Preußen Münster	3–0	3–1	0–2	4–0	2–1	2–1	3–3	2–3	2–0	0–3	0–0	—	1–1	0–0	1–2	2–0	1–0	1–3	2–3	0–1
VfL Osnabrück	2–1	0–2	1–1	1–0	0–1	0–1	1–1	3–0	1–0	4–0	3–2	1–1	—	1–0	1–2	4–1	2–2	3–0	3–1	1–0
Jahn Regensburg	1–1	3–5	2–0	2–1	1–1	0–0	3–1	2–4	0–0	1–0	0–3	2–0	0–0	—	1–1	2–0	0–1	2–0	0–0	3–0
Hansa Rostock	1–1	1–2	0–1	1–2	0–1	1–0	1–0	2–1	0–1	0–0	0–1	2–4	1–1	4–2	—	0–0	2–2	3–1	0–1	1–1
1. FC Saarbrücken	1–1	1–1	0–1	0–1	0–2	2–0	0–1	3–0	2–3	1–2	2–3	2–2	0–0	3–2	2–0	—	3–2	0–1	1–0	1–2
Stuttgarter Kickers	3–1	0–3	0–0	3–0	2–0	2–1	0–1	1–0	3–3	1–1	1–3	1–1	1–0	3–0	2–0	1–0	—	0–2	2–3	2–0
VfB Stuttgart II	4–0	1–1	1–1	1–2	1–1	2–1	2–1	1–2	0–3	1–1	0–2	0–0	2–1	1–1	4–1	2–0	0–1	—	3–2	1–2
SpVgg Unterhaching	1–3	1–1	2–4	2–1	4–1	2–0	2–1	0–0	0–3	0–0	1–1	1–2	3–0	0–4	1–3	3–1	2–2	4–0	—	1–1
Wehen Wiesbaden	2–1	1–0	0–1	1–1	2–0	3–0	1–1	0–3	0–1	1–1	2–1	1–1	1–0	1–1	1–3	1–0	4–0	1–1	0–2	—

Source: DFB
Legend: Blue = home team win; Yellow = draw; Red = away team win.

== Top goalscorers ==
As of 10 May 2014

Rank	Player	Club	Goals
1	(Germany) Dominik Stroh-Engel	SV Darmstadt 98	27
2	(Germany) Daniel Frahn	RB Leipzig	19
3	(Nigeria) Kingsley Onuegbu	MSV Duisburg	14
4	(Germany) Dominik Kaiser	RB Leipzig	13
4	(Germany) Marc Schnatterer	1. FC Heidenheim	13
6	(Germany) Marvin Ducksch	Borussia Dortmund II	12
6	(Germany) Anton Fink	Chemnitzer FC	12
6	(Finland) Timo Furuholm	Hallescher FC	12
6	(Italy) Vincenzo Marchese	Stuttgarter Kickers	12
10	(Germany) Abdenour Amachaibou	Jahn Regensburg	11
10	(Germany) Sören Bertram	Hallescher FC	11
10	(Germany) Adriano Grimaldi	VfL Osnabrück	11

== Player awards ==
The following players were named as player of the month throughout the season.

- August: (Nigeria) Kingsley Onuegbu (MSV Duisburg)
- September: (Germany) Michael Ratajczak (MSV Duisburg)
- October: (Germany) Odisseas Vlachodimos (VfB Stuttgart II)
- November: (Germany) Leonhard Haas (Hansa Rostock)
- December: (Poland) David Blacha (Hansa Rostock)
- February: (Republic of the Congo) Francky Sembolo (Hallescher FC)
- March: (Germany) Michael Gardawski (MSV Duisburg)
