= 2014–15 3. Liga =

7th season of the 3. Liga

3. Liga
- Season: 2014–15
- Champions: Arminia Bielefeld
- Promoted: Arminia Bielefeld; MSV Duisburg
- Relegated: Borussia Dortmund II; SpVgg Unterhaching; SSV Jahn Regensburg
- Matches: 380
- Goals: 1,010 (2.66 per match)
- Top goalscorer: Fabian Klos (23 goals)

The 2014–15 3. Liga was the seventh season of the 3. Liga, Germany's third-level football league.

The league consisted of twenty teams: The teams placed fourth through seventeenth of the 2013–14 season, the lowest two teams from the 2013–14 2. Bundesliga, the three promoted teams the 2013–14 Regionalliga and the losers of the relegation play-off between the 16th-placed 2. Bundesliga team and the third-placed 3. Liga team.

== Teams ==
=== Stadiums and locations ===
Location of teams in the 2014–15 3. Liga

Team	Location	Stadium	Stadium capacity
SG Sonnenhof Großaspach	Aspach	Mechatronik Arena	10,000
Arminia Bielefeld	Bielefeld	Schüco-Arena	27,300
Chemnitzer FC	Chemnitz	Stadion an der Gellertstraße	18,712
SC Fortuna Köln	Cologne	Südstadion	14,800
Borussia Dortmund II	Dortmund	Stadion Rote Erde	10,000
MSV Duisburg	Duisburg	Schauinsland-Reisen-Arena	31,500
Dynamo Dresden	Dresden	Glücksgas-Stadion	32,066
Energie Cottbus	Cottbus	Stadion der Freundschaft	22,528
Hallescher FC	Halle	Erdgas Sportpark	15,057
Hansa Rostock	Rostock	DKB-Arena	29,000
Holstein Kiel	Kiel	Holstein-Stadion	11,386
1. FSV Mainz 05 II	Mainz	Stadion am Bruchweg	20,300
Jahn Regensburg	Regensburg	Jahnstadion	12,500
VfL Osnabrück	Osnabrück	Osnatel-Arena	16,667
Preußen Münster	Münster	Preußenstadion	15,050
Rot-Weiß Erfurt	Erfurt	Steigerwaldstadion	17,500
VfB Stuttgart II	Stuttgart	Gazi-Stadion auf der Waldau	10,100
Stuttgarter Kickers	Stuttgart	Gazi-Stadion auf der Waldau	10,100
SpVgg Unterhaching	Unterhaching	Stadion am Sportpark	15,053
SV Wehen Wiesbaden	Wiesbaden	BRITA-Arena	12,250

=== Personnel and sponsorships ===
Team	Head coach	Team captain	Kitmaker	Shirt sponsor
Arminia Bielefeld	(Germany) Norbert Meier	(Germany) Fabian Klos	Saller	getgoods.de
Chemnitzer FC	(Germany) Karsten Heine	(Germany) Anton Fink	adidas	aetka Communication Center
Borussia Dortmund II	(United States) David Wagner	(Germany) David Solga	Puma	Evonik
Dynamo Dresden	(Slovakia) Peter Németh	(Germany) Marco Hartmann	Nike	Feldschlösschen
Energie Cottbus	(Germany) Stefan Krämer	(Germany) Uwe Möhrle	Saller	Karton.eu
MSV Duisburg	(Italy) Gino Lettieri	(Germany) Steffen Bohl	Uhlsport	Rhein-Power
1. FSV Mainz 05 II	(Germany) Sandro Schwarz	(Germany) Damian Roßbach	Nike	ENTEGA
Hallescher FC	(Germany) Sven Köhler	(Germany) Tim Kruse	Masita	Helplus
Hansa Rostock	(Germany) Karsten Baumann	(Germany) Christian Stuff	Nike	Veolia
Holstein Kiel	(Germany) Karsten Neitzel	(Poland) Rafael Kazior	adidas	Famila
Jahn Regensburg	(Germany) Christian Brand	(Germany) Sebastian Nachreiner	Saller	Händlmaier
VfL Osnabrück	(Germany) Maik Walpurgis	(Germany) Paul Thomik	adidas	Sparkasse Osnabrück
Preußen Münster	(Germany) Ralf Loose	(Germany) Jens Truckenbrod	Nike	Tuja Zeitarbeit
Rot-Weiß Erfurt	(Germany) Christian Preußer	(Germany) André Laurito	Saller	Thüringer Energie AG
SC Fortuna Köln	(Germany) Uwe Koschinat	(Germany) Thomas Kraus	Jako	HIT Handelsgruppe
VfB Stuttgart II	(Germany) Jürgen Kramny	(Germany) Tobias Rathgeb	Puma	GAZI
Stuttgarter Kickers	(Germany) Horst Steffen	(Italy) Vincenzo Marchese	Umbro	Subaru
SpVgg Unterhaching	(Germany) Claus Schromm	(Germany) Jonas Hummels	Adidas	Alpenbauer
SV Wehen Wiesbaden	(Germany) Christian Hock	(Germany) Nico Herzig	Nike	Brita
SG Sonnenhof Großaspach	(Germany) Rüdiger Rehm	(Germany) Daniel Hägele	Puma	Urbacher Mineralquellen

=== Managerial changes ===
Team	Outgoing manager	Manner of departure	Date of vacancy	Position in table	Incoming manager	Date of appointment
Energie Cottbus	(Germany) René Rydlewicz	End of tenure as caretaker	11 May 2014	Pre-season	(Germany) Stefan Krämer	11 May 2014
Hansa Rostock	(Germany) Dirk Lottner	Mutual consent	11 May 2014	Pre-season	(Germany) Peter Vollmann	13 May 2014
Jahn Regensburg	(Germany) Thomas Stratos	Mutual consent	11 May 2014	Pre-season	(Germany) Alexander Schmidt	13 May 2014
Dynamo Dresden	(Germany) Olaf Janßen	Sacked	13 May 2014	Pre-season	(Germany) Stefan Böger	23 May 2014
MSV Duisburg	(Germany) Karsten Baumann	End of contract	31 May 2014	Pre-season	(Italy) Gino Lettieri	15 June 2014
SG Sonnenhof Großaspach	(Germany) Rüdiger Rehm	Break	28 October 2014	18th	(Germany) Uwe Rapolder	28 October 2014
Jahn Regensburg	(Germany) Alexander Schmidt	Sacked	10 November 2014	20th	(Germany) Christian Brand	18 November 2014
Hansa Rostock	(Germany) Peter Vollmann	Sacked	7 December 2014	19th	(Germany) Karsten Baumann	9 December 2014
Dynamo Dresden	(Germany) Stefan Böger	Sacked	16 February 2015	8th	(Slovakia) Peter Németh	16 February 2015
Mainz II	(Switzerland) Martin Schmidt	Promoted	17 February 2015	17th	(Germany) Sandro Schwarz	17 February 2015
SG Sonnenhof Großaspach	(Germany) Uwe Rapolder	Resigned	25 February 2015	19th	(Germany) Rüdiger Rehm	25 February 2015
FC Rot-Weiß Erfurt	(Austria) Walter Kogler	Sacked	23 March 2015	7th	(Germany) Christian Preußer	23 March 2015
SpVgg Unterhaching	(Germany) Christian Ziege	Resigned	25 March 2015	17th	(Germany) Claus Schromm	26 March 2015
SV Wehen Wiesbaden	(Germany) Marc Kienle	Sacked	12 April 2015	10th	(Germany) Christian Hock	12 April 2015

== League table ==
Pos	Team	Pld	W	D	L	GF	GA	GD	Pts	Promotion, qualification or relegation
1	Arminia Bielefeld (C, P)	38	22	8	8	75	41	+34	74	Promotion to 2. Bundesliga and qualification for DFB-Pokal
2	MSV Duisburg (P)	38	20	11	7	63	40	+23	71	Promotion to 2. Bundesliga and qualification for DFB-Pokal
3	Holstein Kiel	38	18	13	7	53	30	+23	67	Qualification for promotion play-offs and DFB-Pokal
4	Stuttgarter Kickers	38	18	11	9	61	47	+14	65	Qualification for DFB-Pokal
5	Chemnitzer FC	38	17	8	13	44	36	+8	59	
6	Dynamo Dresden	38	16	8	14	52	48	+4	56	
7	Energie Cottbus	38	15	11	12	50	50	0	56	
8	Preußen Münster	38	15	9	14	53	49	+4	54	
9	SV Wehen Wiesbaden	38	15	8	15	54	44	+10	53	
10	Hallescher FC	38	15	8	15	51	53	−2	53	
11	VfL Osnabrück	38	14	10	14	49	51	−2	52	
12	Rot-Weiß Erfurt	38	14	9	15	47	54	−7	51	
13	VfB Stuttgart II (Note: Reserve teams are ineligible for promotion or DFB-Pokal qualification.)	38	13	8	17	48	57	−9	47	
14	Fortuna Köln	38	12	10	16	38	47	−9	46	
15	Sonnenhof Großaspach	38	12	10	16	39	60	−21	46	
16	Mainz 05 II	38	10	12	16	43	52	−9	42	
17	Hansa Rostock	38	11	8	19	54	68	−14	41	
18	Borussia Dortmund II (R)	38	8	15	15	41	51	−10	39	Relegation to Regionalliga
19	SpVgg Unterhaching (Note: SpVgg Unterhaching were deducted two points for license violation.) (R)	38	11	8	19	51	67	−16	39	Relegation to Regionalliga
20	Jahn Regensburg (R)	38	8	7	23	44	65	−21	31	Relegation to Regionalliga

Source: DFB
Rules for classification: 1) Points; 2) Goal difference; 3) Goals scored
(C) Champions; (P) Promoted; (R) Relegated

== Results ==
Home \ Away	DSC	CFC	FCE	DO2	SGD	DUI	ERF	SGS	HFC	KSV	FKO	MA2	PRM	OSN	JRE	ROS	SKI	ST2	UNT	WEH
Arminia Bielefeld	—	2–0	3–0	3–0	4–1	4–2	3–0	2–0	1–5	2–2	2–0	2–0	2–1	1–2	2–2	3–2	4–2	3–0	4–0	1–1
Chemnitzer FC	0–0	—	0–1	3–1	2–0	0–0	2–1	2–0	0–2	0–0	3–1	1–2	1–0	2–0	4–1	2–0	1–1	1–0	2–0	2–1
Energie Cottbus	1–1	2–2	—	0–3	1–3	2–0	0–0	2–0	1–2	0–2	1–1	2–1	2–1	2–2	4–1	1–0	2–0	2–3	3–0	2–0
Borussia Dortmund II	1–1	1–3	3–0	—	2–3	1–4	0–0	0–1	1–1	2–2	0–2	1–3	1–1	2–2	5–1	1–1	1–1	2–0	1–0	0–0
Dynamo Dresden	2–0	1–0	1–0	1–1	—	0–2	0–1	0–1	2–3	1–2	0–0	1–1	3–1	2–1	2–1	2–1	1–1	2–1	5–1	0–1
MSV Duisburg	1–1	3–0	3–2	2–1	0–0	—	2–0	1–1	1–1	3–1	2–0	1–1	2–1	3–0	2–0	2–2	2–0	1–1	1–0	3–2
Rot-Weiß Erfurt	0–4	2–0	2–0	1–2	2–0	0–2	—	0–1	1–2	3–2	2–1	1–0	1–0	3–1	2–0	4–1	1–1	3–1	1–0	0–2
Sonnenhof Großaspach	0–1	1–0	2–2	0–0	1–3	1–1	1–1	—	2–1	1–1	2–1	3–1	1–1	1–0	2–1	1–1	1–1	3–3	1–4	0–3
Hallescher FC	0–3	0–3	3–1	0–0	1–1	1–2	1–2	0–2	—	2–2	0–2	1–2	3–0	2–1	2–1	1–2	1–2	0–2	2–1	3–1
Holstein Kiel	1–0	2–1	0–1	0–2	1–0	1–0	4–1	3–1	3–0	—	4–0	1–0	1–1	1–0	1–0	2–0	0–2	1–1	0–0	0–0
Fortuna Köln	3–0	1–2	3–0	0–0	1–0	0–1	2–2	4–0	2–2	0–0	—	2–2	1–1	0–1	1–0	1–0	0–2	0–1	2–0	2–1
Mainz 05 II	1–2	1–1	0–0	0–0	1–0	3–4	3–1	3–1	0–1	1–1	1–1	—	4–0	1–1	1–0	0–2	2–3	0–2	1–5	1–1
Preußen Münster	3–1	2–3	0–0	1–2	2–1	1–0	2–2	3–1	2–0	1–3	1–0	1–1	—	2–0	3–0	3–4	2–3	1–0	2–0	3–2
VfL Osnabrück	0–4	2–0	1–3	1–1	2–2	1–1	3–1	2–0	2–0	2–1	0–1	2–0	0–1	—	2–0	1–0	4–1	3–1	1–0	1–3
Jahn Regensburg	0–1	0–1	1–1	3–0	2–3	3–1	1–0	2–0	1–1	0–2	4–0	0–0	0–1	1–1	—	4–4	0–2	4–1	0–2	3–0
Hansa Rostock	4–2	1–0	0–1	3–2	1–3	1–3	1–1	1–3	0–1	0–4	4–0	2–1	0–2	2–2	2–2	—	1–0	4–1	2–2	0–1
Stuttgarter Kickers	0–2	2–0	2–2	2–0	3–4	4–2	0–0	2–0	1–1	0–0	2–0	2–0	1–1	1–1	3–1	3–0	—	2–1	3–0	2–1
VfB Stuttgart II	2–0	0–0	0–1	2–1	0–0	1–2	2–2	4–1	0–1	1–0	3–1	1–0	0–3	0–0	1–2	3–2	5–1	—	1–3	1–1
SpVgg Unterhaching	1–3	0–0	3–3	2–0	3–0	1–1	4–2	3–1	0–4	1–1	1–1	1–2	1–0	3–4	3–2	2–1	1–2	0–1	—	3–3
Wehen Wiesbaden	1–1	2–0	1–2	1–0	0–2	1–0	3–1	0–1	3–0	0–1	0–1	1–2	2–2	2–0	2–0	1–2	2–1	4–1	4–0	—

Source: DFB
Legend: Blue = home team win; Yellow = draw; Red = away team win.

== Top goalscorers ==
Updated 23 May 2015

Rank	Player	Club	Goals
1	(Germany) Fabian Klos	Arminia Bielefeld	23
2	(Germany) Justin Eilers	Dynamo Dresden	19
3	(Germany) Anton Fink	Chemnitzer FC	16
3	(Germany) Zlatko Janjić	MSV Duisburg	16
5	(Germany) Marcel Ziemer	Hansa Rostock	15
6	(Germany) Stanislav Iljutcenko	VfL Osnabrück	14
6	(Nigeria) Kingsley Onuegbu	MSV Duisburg	14
8	(Germany) Tammo Harder	Borussia Dortmund II	13
8	(Germany) Tim Kleindienst	Energie Cottbus	13
8	(Democratic Republic of the Congo) Addy-Waku Menga	VfL Osnabrück	13
