= Christian Preußer =

German football manager (born 1984)

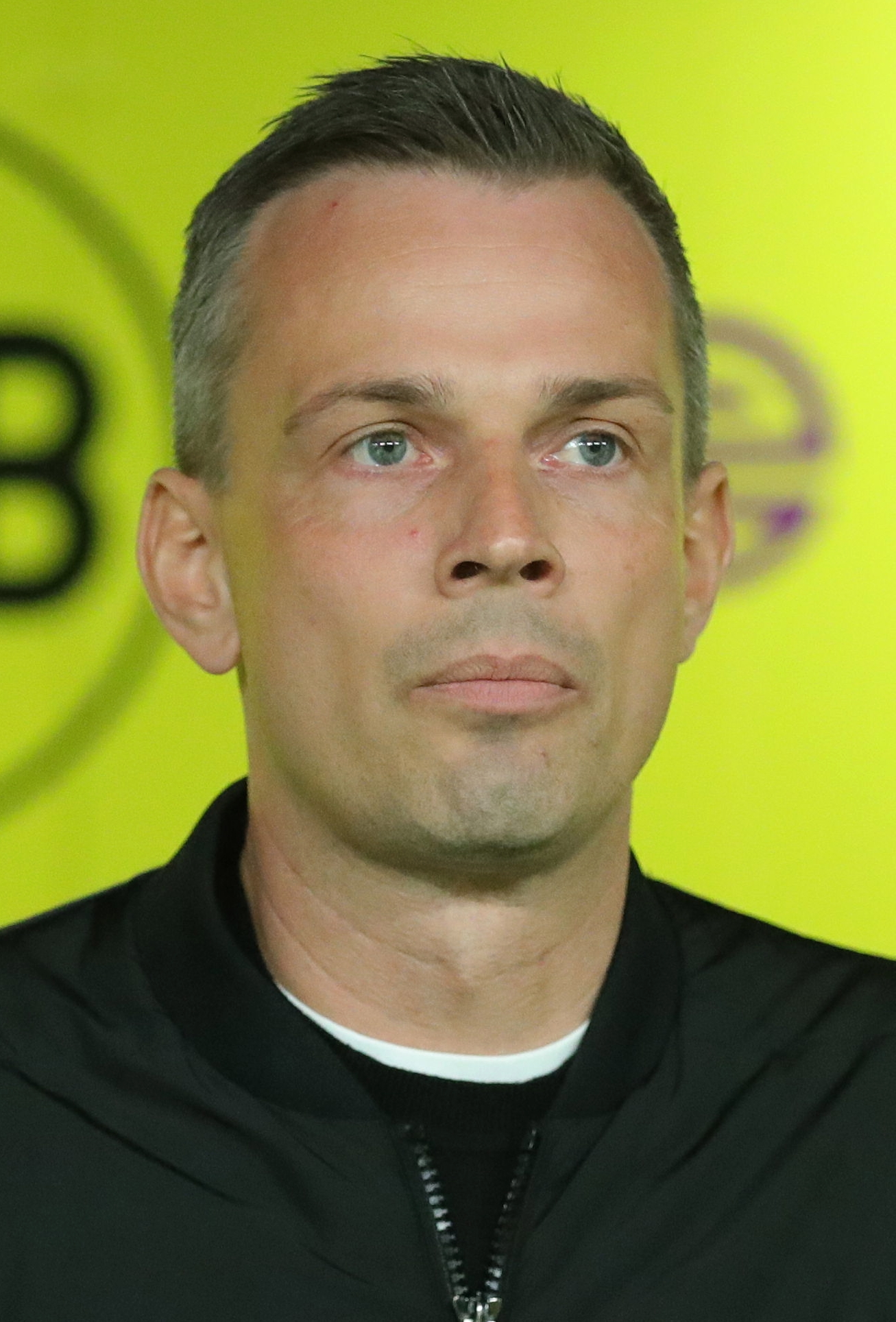
- Preußer in 2022

Personal information
- Date of birth: 23 January 1984 (age 42)
- Place of birth: Berlin, Germany
- Height: 1.84 m (6 ft 0 in)

Managerial career
- Years: Team
- 2012: Rot-Weiß Erfurt (interim)
- 2015: Rot-Weiß Erfurt
- 2016–2021: SC Freiburg II
- 2021–2022: Fortuna Düsseldorf
- 2022–2023: Borussia Dortmund II

Christian Preußer (born 23 January 1984) is a German football manager. He is currently the lead academy coach for Wolverhampton Wanderers.

== Coaching career ==
Preußer managed Rot-Weiß Erfurt's under-19 team before signing a contract to manage the senior team until mid-2015 on 24 March 2015. The contract was extended until 2016 on 21 April 2015. He was sacked on 15 December 2015.

On 1 July 2016, Preußer was appointed manager of Oberliga Baden-Württemberg team SC Freiburg II. He achieved promotion to the Regionalliga Südwest in his first season and established the side as one of the top teams in the league. Under his reign more than 20 players from the second team made it into professional football.

In February 2021, Preußer announced his intention to leave the club in the summer, in search of a "new challenge". In May 2021, he signed a two-year contract with 2. Bundesliga club Fortuna Düsseldorf, starting from the 2021–22 season. He was sacked on 8 February 2022. In the following summer, he was signed by Borussia Dortmund II. He was sacked in February 2023.

On 20 March 2026, Preußer was announced as the new head of football for Wolverhampton Wanderers academy alongside Ian Sharps.

== Coaching record ==
As of 4 February 2023

Team	From	To	Record							
Team	From	To	G	W	D	L	GF	GA	GD	Win %
Rot-Weiß Erfurt (interim)	26 August 2012	8 September 2012	2	1	1	0	6	1	+5	50.00
Rot-Weiß Erfurt	24 March 2015	15 December 2015	31	9	8	14	39	43	−4	29.03
SC Freiburg II	1 July 2016	30 June 2021	169	95	36	38	303	165	+138	56.21
Fortuna Düsseldorf	1 July 2021	8 February 2022	23	6	5	12	28	33	−5	26.09
Borussia Dortmund II	17 June 2022	6 February 2023	21	6	3	12	17	30	−13	28.57
Total			246	117	53	76	393	272	+121	47.56
