= Marc Kienle =

German footballer (born 1972)

Personal information
- Date of birth: 22 October 1972 (age 54)
- Place of birth: Ruit, West Germany
- Height: 1.81 m (5 ft 11 in)
- Positions: Defender; midfielder

Youth career
- TSV Plattenhardt
- –1991: Stuttgarter Kickers

Senior career*
Years	Team	Apps	(Gls)
1991–1994	VfB Stuttgart (A)	20	(7)
1991–1995	VfB Stuttgart	67	(7)
1995–1998	MSV Duisburg	36	(2)
1998–2000	Karlsruher SC	46	(2)
2000–2001	Alemannia Aachen	14	(1)
2002–2003	MSV Duisburg	52	(4)
2004–2006	MVV	67	(2)
2006	Wormatia Worms	3	(0)
Total		305	(25)

International career
1992	Germany U21	2	(0)

Managerial career
- 2007–2008: VfB Stuttgart (U19 assistant)
- 2008–2010: VfB Stuttgart (U17)
- 2010: VfB Stuttgart (U19)
- 2010–2011: VfB Stuttgart (U17)
- 2012–2013: Bayern Munich (U19)
- 2013–2015: SV Wehen Wiesbaden
- 2018–2019: VfB Stuttgart II
- * Club domestic league appearances and goals

Marc Kienle (born 22 October 1972) is a German football manager and former player. As a player, he spent six seasons in the Bundesliga with VfB Stuttgart and MSV Duisburg.

== Playing career ==
Kienle played youth football for Stuttgarter Kickers, before joining city rivals VfB Stuttgart in 1991. He made his debut for the club on the opening day of the 1991–92 season, as a substitute for Alexander Strehmel in a 1–0 defeat to MSV Duisburg, and made a further nine appearances during the season as Stuttgart won the Bundesliga title. The following season, he only made six appearances, all as a substitute, but scored three times, including both in a 2–0 win over 1. FC Köln after replacing Fritz Walter. He made 23 appearances during the 1993–94 season, again mostly as a sub, and became a regular starter in 1994–95, with 28 appearances as Stuttgart settled into a mid-table position.

Kienle was to drop to the 2. Bundesliga, though, joining MSV Duisburg. He made 31 appearances during the 1995–96 season as Duisburg were promoted in third place, but only made five appearances in the next two seasons combined, and didn't feature in the club's run to the 1998 DFB-Pokal Final, which they lost against Bayern Munich. In 1998, he signed for Karlsruher SC who had just been relegated to the 2. Bundesliga, and missed out on promotion during his first season, finishing fifth. The following year Karlsruhe finished bottom of the table, and were relegated to the Regionalliga Süd, so Kienle left the club.

Kienle stayed in the 2. Bundesliga, signing for Alemannia Aachen, making fourteen appearances during the 2000–01 season as the club finished 10th. He then returned to MSV Duisburg, where he made over 50 appearances in the next two seasons as the club finished in mid-table in the second tier. He spent the first half of the 2003–04 season without a club before joining Dutch Eerste Divisie side MVV, where he would spend the next two and a half years. He returned to Germany in 2006, joining Wormatia Worms of the Oberliga Südwest, but retired shortly after the beginning of the 2006–07 season.

== Coaching career ==
=== VfB Stuttgart ===
After retirement, Kienle returned to VfB Stuttgart as a youth coach. In his first year (from 2007 to 2008) he worked as assistant manager for the U19 team, before becoming the manager of the U17s in the following season and was that until 4 January 2010, where he took over the U19 squad again, after Jens Keller was promoted to first team assistant manager. He took charge of the U17 team again in the following season.

In the summer 2011, he was appointed as head of the youth department. He left the club one year later.

=== Bayern Munich ===
Already in April 2012 it was announced, that Kienle from the upcoming season would be the manager of Bayern Munich's U19 team. He left the club on 27 October 2013, after being offered to become the manager of SV Wehen Wiesbaden.

=== SV Wehen Wiesbaden ===
In October 2013, he took his first senior management job, replacing Peter Vollmann at SV Wehen Wiesbaden. By co-incidence, two of his former MSV Duisburg teammates, Dietmar Hirsch and Horst Steffen, had begun their managerial careers in the same division during the same season. He was sacked on 12 April 2015.

=== Return to VfB Stuttgart ===
On 5 June 2016 it was confirmed, that Kienle had returned to Stuttgart and took over the role of manager sports coordination at VfB Stuttgart. He would be responsible for the integration of junior training, scouting and the licensing area at VfB. In the summer 2018, he took over the reserve team, VfB Stuttgart II. He left the position on 1 April 2019.

== Honours ==
VfB Stuttgart

- Bundesliga: 1991–92

MSV Duisburg

- DFB-Pokal finalist: 1997–98
