= Roland Seitz =

German footballer and manager (born 1964)

Personal information
- Date of birth: October 1, 1964 (age 62)
- Place of birth: Neumarkt (Oberpfalz), West Germany
- Position: Striker

Youth career
- –1983: ASV Neumarkt

Senior career*
| Years | Team | Apps | (Gls) |
| 1983–1985 | ASV Neumarkt | | |
| 1985–1986 | SpVgg Unterhaching | | |
| 1986–1987 | FC Augsburg | | |
| 1987–1989 | 1. FC Amberg | | |
| 1989–1992 | TSV Vestenbergsgreuth | | |
| 1992–1994 | MSV Duisburg | 17 | (3) |
| 1994 | FC Homburg | 2 | (0) |
| 1994–1995 | FC Augsburg | 22 | (8) |
| 1995–1998 | ASV Neumarkt | | |
| 1998–1999 | Jahn Regensburg | | |
| 1999 | Post/Süd Regensburg | | |
| 1999–2000 | Jahn Forchheim | | |

Managerial career
- 1998–1999: ASV Neumarkt (player-coach)
- 1998–1999: Jahn Regensburg (player-coach)
- 1999: Post/Süd Regensburg (player-coach)
- 1999–2000: Jahn Forchheim (player-coach)
- 2000–2001: Greuther Fürth II
- 2001: SpVgg SV Weiden
- 2001–2005: 1. SC Feucht
- 2006: Eintracht Trier
- 2006: SC Paderborn
- 2008: Erzgebirge Aue
- 2008–2010: SSV Reutlingen
- 2010–2014: Eintracht Trier
- 2014: SV Elversberg
- 2014–2018: SV Elversberg (sporting director)
- 2014: SV Elversberg (caretaker)
- 2018: SV Elversberg (caretaker)
- 2019–2021: VfR Aalen
- 2022: FC Berdenia Berbourg
- 2023–2024: SGV Freiberg
- 2025–: FC 08 Homburg
- * Club domestic league appearances and goals

Roland Seitz (born 1 October 1964) is a German former football player who is currently the manager of FC 08 Homburg. Before that he was the coach of SV Elversberg, where he also had the role as the sporting director.
