= Alexander Ukrow =

German footballer

Personal information
- Date of birth: 7 December 1970
- Place of birth: Berlin, Germany
- Height: 1.84 m (6 ft 0 in)
- Position: Defender

Senior career*
Years	Team	Apps	(Gls)
1988–1991	FC Victoria 91 Frankfurt		
1991–1996	Kickers Emden		
1996–1998	SV Meppen	39	(6)
1998–2000	SV Wilhelmshaven		
2000–2004	VfL Osnabrück		

Managerial career
- 2010–2011: VfL Osnabrück (junior)
- 2011–2013: VfL Osnabrück (assistant)
- 2013: VfL Osnabrück
- 2014–2015: VfL Osnabrück II
- 2015–2017: VfL Osnabrück (assistant)
- * Club domestic league appearances and goals

Alexander Ukrow (born 7 December 1970) is a German former professional footballer who played as a defender and who has worked as a coach.
