= Gerd Schädlich =

German footballer and manager (1952–2022)

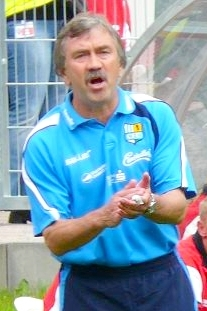
- Schädlich in 2008

Personal information
- Date of birth: 30 December 1952
- Place of birth: Rodewisch, East Germany
- Date of death: 29 January 2022 (aged 69)
- Height: 1.76 m (5 ft 9 in)
- Position: Midfielder

Youth career
- TSG Rodewisch
- FC Karl-Marx-Stadt

Senior career*
Years	Team	Apps	(Gls)
1972–1976	FC Karl-Marx-Stadt	25	(1)

Managerial career
- 1978–1981: BSG Motor Scharfenstein
- 1981: Traktor Niederwiesa
- 1982–1985: BSG Aufbau Krumhermersdorf
- 1985–1986: FC Karl-Marx-Stadt II
- 1986–1987: BSG Aktivist Schwarze Pumpe
- 1987–1990: dkk Krumhermersdorf
- 1990: Stahl Riesa
- 1991–1996: FSV Zwickau
- 1997: FC Sachsen Leipzig
- 1998–1999: FSV Hoyerswerda
- 1999–2007: Erzgebirge Aue
- 2008–2013: Chemnitzer FC
- * Club domestic league appearances and goals

Gerd Schädlich (30 December 1952 – 29 January 2022) was a German football player and manager who is most known for managing East German professional teams Erzgebirge Aue and Chemnitzer FC. Schädlich died after a long illness on 29 January 2022, at the age of 69.
