= Fuat Kılıç =

German footballer and coach

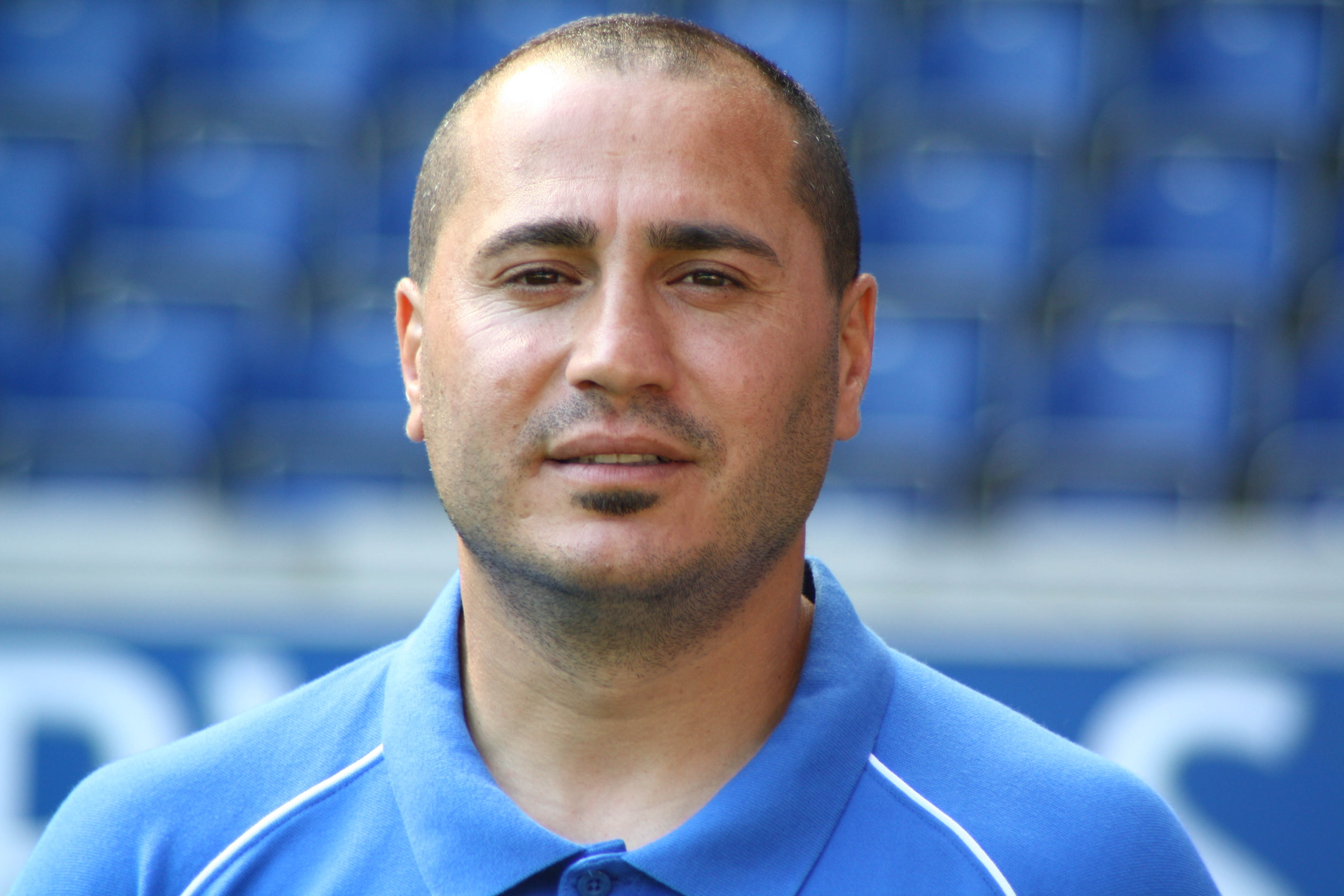
- Kılıç in 2011

Personal information
- Date of birth: 9 May 1973 (age 53)
- Place of birth: Gümüşhane, Turkey
- Position: Defender

Youth career
- –1998: SpVgg EGC Wirges

Senior career*
Years	Team	Apps	(Gls)
1998–2001	SC Renault Brühl		
2001	Gümüşhanespor		
2001–2002	Blau-Weiß Brühl		
2002–2003	PSI Yurdumspor Köln		
2003–2004	SV Roßbach/Verscheid		

Managerial career
- 2012: Kasımpaşa (caretaker)
- 2014–2015: 1. FC Saarbrücken
- 2016–2020: Alemannia Aachen
- 2021–2022: Alemannia Aachen
- 2023: VfB Oldenburg
- 2023–2024: VfB Oldenburg
- * Club domestic league appearances and goals

Fuat Kılıç (born 9 May 1973) is a Turkish-German former footballer and coach, who most recently managed VfB Oldenburg.

== Managerial statistics ==
As of match played 30 August 2024

Managerial record by team and tenure
Team	From	To	Record					Ref
Team	From	To	G	W	D	L	Win %	Ref
Kasımpaşa (caretaker)	24 September 2012	7 October 2012	2	1	0	1	50.00	
1. FC Saarbrücken	11 February 2014	30 June 2015	50	25	8	17	50.00	
Alemannia Aachen	1 January 2016	30 June 2020	160	75	39	46	46.88	
Alemannia Aachen	29 October 2021	12 October 2022	40	16	10	14	40.00	
VfB Oldenburg	12 March 2023	30 June 2023	13	4	2	7	30.77	
VfB Oldenburg	18 September 2023	31 August 2024	35	15	7	13	42.86	
Total			300	136	66	98	45.33	—
