= Andreas Bergmann =

German footballer-manager (born 1959)

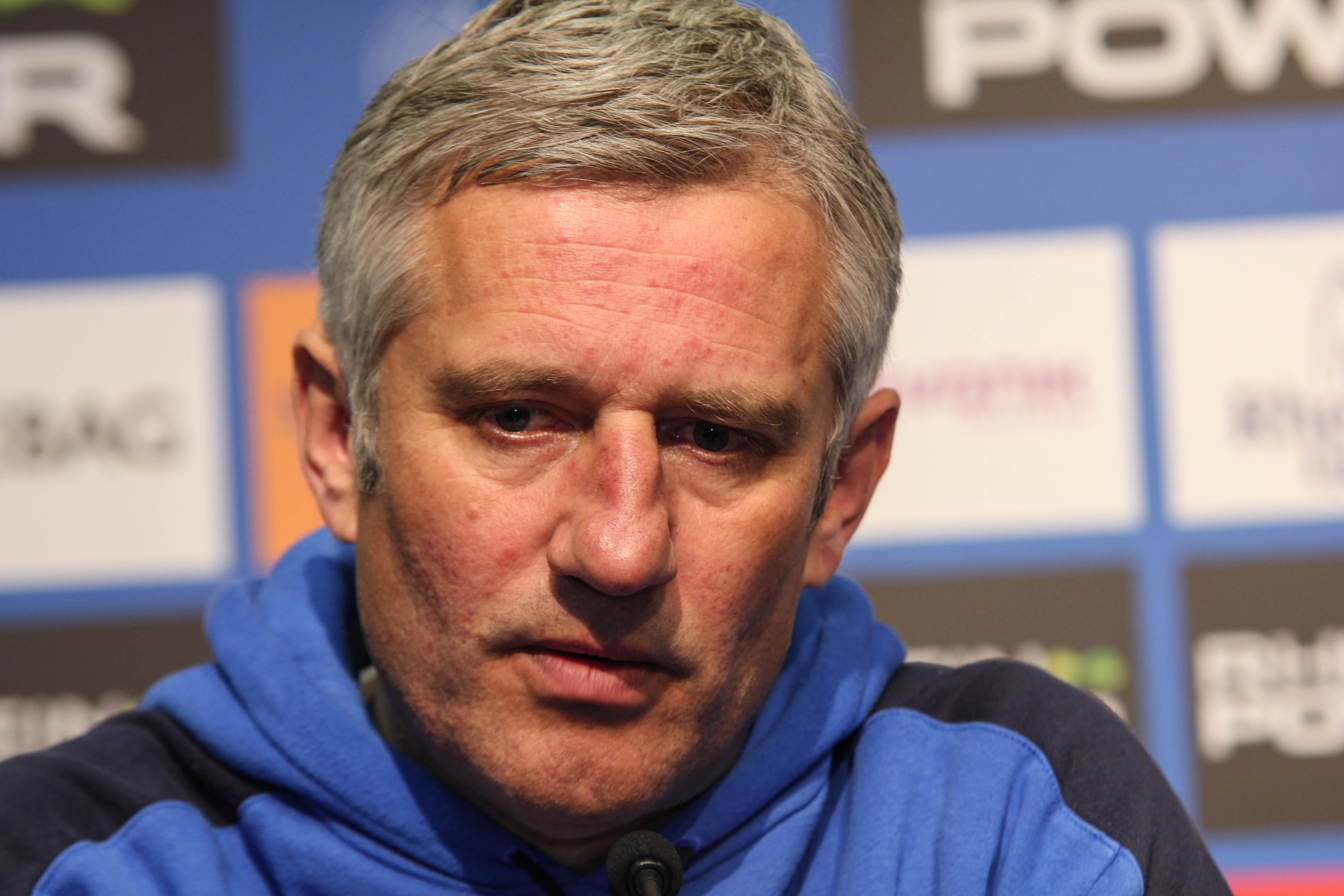
- Bergmann in 2012

Personal information
- Date of birth: 18 June 1959 (age 67)
- Place of birth: Steinfeld, West Germany
- Height: 1.89 m (6 ft 2 in)
- Position: Midfielder

Youth career
- 1980–1982: SV Steinfeld 1931

Senior career*
Years	Team	Apps	(Gls)
1982–1985	1. FC Köln II	49	(3)
1985–1986	Wuppertaler SV	19	(1)
1986–1988	Bonner SC	42	(0)
1988–1989	VfB 06/08 Remscheid	30	(7)
Total		140	(7)

Managerial career
- 1989–1994: SV Falke Steinfeld
- 1994–1997: Niedersächsischer Fußballverband
- 1998–2001: Karlsruher SC (assistant manager)
- 2001–2004: FC St. Pauli II
- 2004–2006: FC St. Pauli
- 2007–2009: Hannover 96 II
- 2007–2009: Hannover 96 (Youth co-ordinator)
- 2009–2010: Hannover 96 (caretaker)
- 2010–2011: Hannover 96 II
- 2011–2012: VfL Bochum
- 2013–2014: Hansa Rostock
- 2019–: Daytona SC
- * Club domestic league appearances and goals

Andreas Bergmann (born 18 June 1959) is a German football coach and former player.

== Playing career ==
Bergmann was born in Steinfeld A midfielder, he played for 1. FC Köln II, Wuppertaler SV, Bonner SC and VfB 06/08 Remscheid.

== Coaching career ==
Bergmann managed Falke Steinfeld from July 1989 to June 1994.

Bergmann was head coach of the reserve team of FC St. Pauli from July 2001 to March 2004 before becoming head coach of the senior squad from March 2004 to November 2006. Bergmann was at St. Pauli for 5 years, 4 months and 19 days.

As with St. Pauli, Bergmann became head coach of the reserve team of Hannover 96 prior to taking the reins of the senior squad. Bergmann was head coach of the reserve team between July 2007 and August 2009. Bergmann was named interim head coach of the senior squad in August 2009 and was given a contract until the end of the season. However, he was sacked in January 2010 and was replaced by Mirko Slomka. Bergmann was at Hannover for 2 years, 6 months and 19 days.

Following his position at Hannover, he joined VfL Bochum. His tenure was from September 2011 to October 2012. Bergmann had been head coach of Hansa Rostock since May 2013 until his sacking in April 2014.

== Coaching record ==
As of 2 April 2014

Team	From	To	Length	Record					
Team	From	To	Length	G	W	D	L	Win %	Ref.
Falke Steinfeld	1 July 1989	30 June 1994	4 years, 11 months and 29 days	—					
FC St. Pauli II	1 July 2001	27 March 2004	2 years, 8 months and 26 days	—					
FC St. Pauli	28 March 2004	20 November 2006	2 years, 7 months and 23 days	97	40	32	25	41.24	
Hannover 96 II	1 July 2007	29 August 2009	2 years, 1 month and 28 days	71	33	15	23	46.48	
Hannover 96	30 August 2009	20 January 2010	4 months and 21 days	16	4	4	8	25.00	
VfL Bochum	15 September 2011	28 October 2012	1 year, 1 month and 13 days	38	11	9	18	28.95	
Hansa Rostock	31 May 2013	2 April 2014	10 months and 2 days	31	12	8	11	38.71	
Total				253	100	68	85	39.53	—
