= Jens Kiefer =

German footballer and manager (born 1974)

Personal information
- Date of birth: 19 November 1974 (age 51)
- Place of birth: Sankt Ingbert, Germany
- Position: Midfielder

Senior career*
Years	Team	Apps	(Gls)
- SV Elversberg
- FK Pirmasens

Managerial career
- 2008–2010: FC Homburg
- 2010–2011: SV Elversberg II
- 2011–2013: SV Elversberg
- 2014: Eintracht Trier
- 2014–2017: FC Homburg
- 2023: Hallescher FC
- * Club domestic league appearances and goals

Jens Kiefer (born 19 November 1974) is a German football coach of Hallescher FC.
