= Uwe Wolf =

German footballer (born 1967)

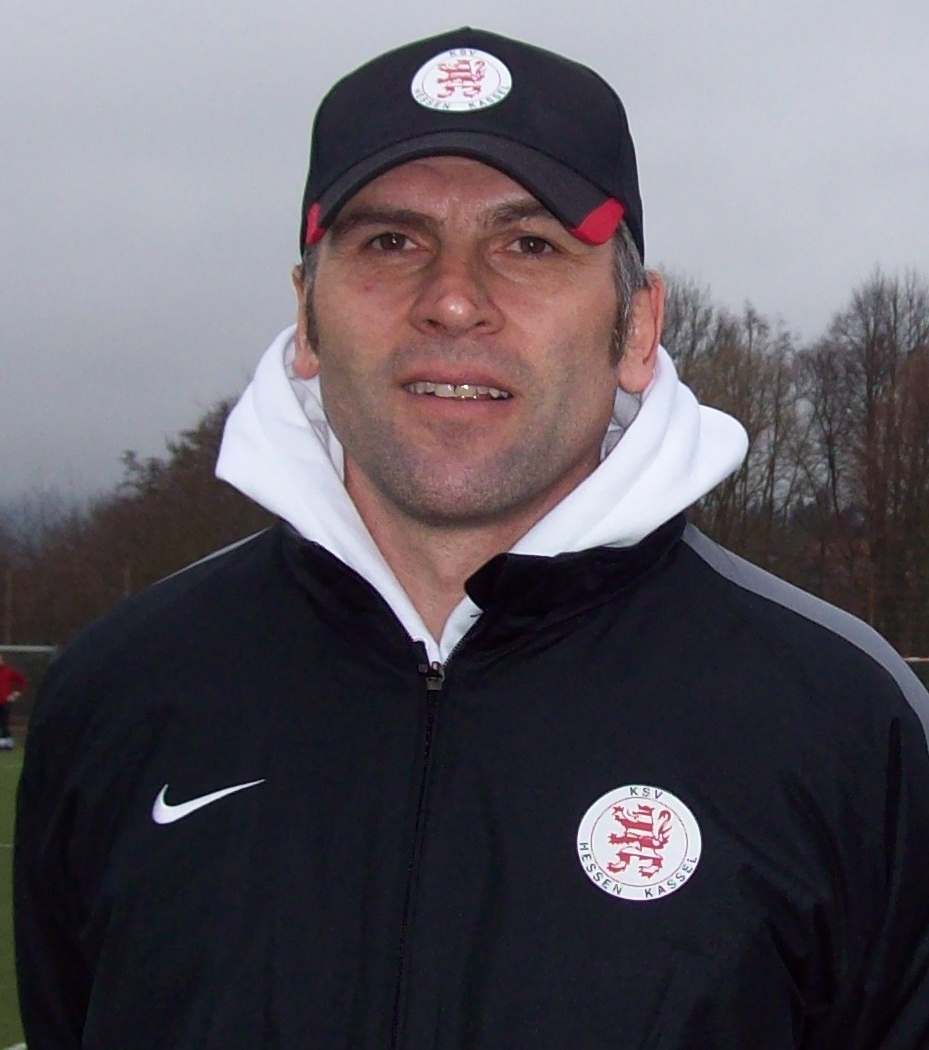
- Wolf in 2012

Personal information
- Date of birth: 10 August 1967 (age 59)
- Place of birth: Neustadt (Weinstr.), West Germany
- Position: Centre-back

Team information
- Current team: TSV Buchbach (Manager)

Youth career
- 1974–1985: 1. FC 08 Haßloch
- 1985–1986: Waldhof Mannheim

Senior career*
Years	Team	Apps	(Gls)
1986–1989	SV Edenkoben		
1989–1994	1. FC Nürnberg	81	(5)
1994–1995	1860 Munich	9	(0)
1995–1996	Necaxa	26	(1)
1996–1997	Puebla	26	(3)
1997–1998	Venados Yucatán		
1998–1999	Austria Salzburg	3	(0)
1999–2000	Dynamo Dresden	4	(0)
2000–2001	Freamunde		

Managerial career
- 2007–2008: 1860 Munich II
- 2009: 1860 Munich (Caretaker)
- 2011–2013: Hessen Kassel
- 2013–2014: Wacker Burghausen
- 2014–2017: Wacker Burghausen
- 2020–2021: SV Mehring
- 2021–2022: VfR Aalen
- 2023–: TSV Buchbach
- * Club domestic league appearances and goals

Uwe Wolf (born 10 August 1967 in Neustadt an der Weinstraße) is a German football coach and former professional player.

== Honours ==
Necaxa

- Primera División de México: 1995–96
