= Claus Schromm =

German football coach (born 1969)

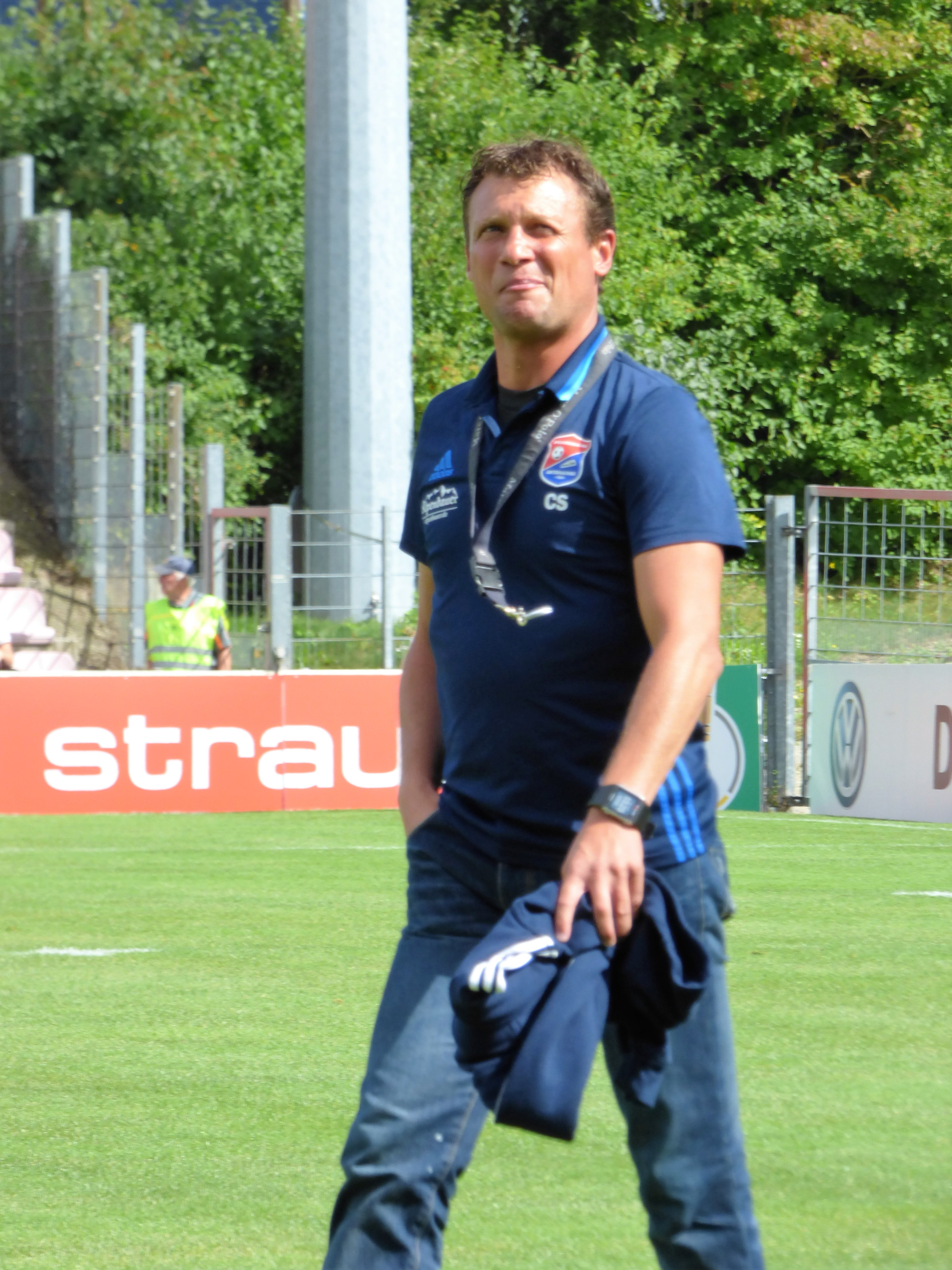

Personal information
- Date of birth: 21 April 1969 (age 57)
- Place of birth: Munich, Germany

Managerial career
- Years: Team
- 2010–2011: SV Heimstetten
- 2012–2014: SpVgg Unterhaching
- 2015–2020: SpVgg Unterhaching

Claus Schromm (born 21 April 1969) is a German football coach who last managed SpVgg Unterhaching.

On 26 March 2015 he was appointed as the head coach of SpVgg Unterhaching for the second time. He left after five years on 29 July 2020.
