= Dietmar Hirsch =

German football manager (born 1971)

Personal information
- Date of birth: 8 December 1971 (age 54)
- Place of birth: Viersen, West Germany
- Height: 1.87 m (6 ft 2 in)
- Position: Midfielder

Team information
- Current team: MSV Duisburg (head coach)

Youth career
- ASV Süchteln
- –1993: SC Viersen-Rahser

Senior career*
Years	Team	Apps	(Gls)
1993–1995	Borussia Mönchengladbach	21	(0)
1995–2000	MSV Duisburg	141	(11)
2000–2001	SpVgg Unterhaching	22	(1)
2001–2003	Hansa Rostock	42	(3)
2003–2005	MSV Duisburg	26	(1)
2005–2009	VfB Lübeck	113	(7)
Total		375	(23)

Managerial career
- 2010–2011: SV Schackendorf
- 2011: FC Sylt
- 2012–2013: SV Schackendorf
- 2013–2014: SV Elversberg
- 2015–2017: VfB Oldenburg
- 2019: KSV Hessen Kassel
- 2021–2022: Teutonia Ottensen
- 2023–2024: 1. FC Bocholt
- 2024–: MSV Duisburg
- * Club domestic league appearances and goals

Dietmar Hirsch (born 8 December 1971) is a German professional football manager and former player who is the current manager of 3. Liga club MSV Duisburg.

== Coaching career ==
From June 2008 to December 2009 Hirsch worked as athletic director at VfB Lübeck.

From 2013 to 2014 he managed SV Elversberg.

On 22 September 2015, he was named new manager of VfB Oldenburg.

On 17 April 2023, it was announced that Hirsch had been appointed head coach of Regionalliga West club 1. FC Bocholt for the 2023–24 season, replacing Marcus John. After the 2024–25 season, he was signed by MSV Duisburg.

== Honours ==
- DFB-Pokal winner: 1994–95
- DFB-Pokal finalist: 1997–98
