= Karsten Heine =

German footballer (born 1955)

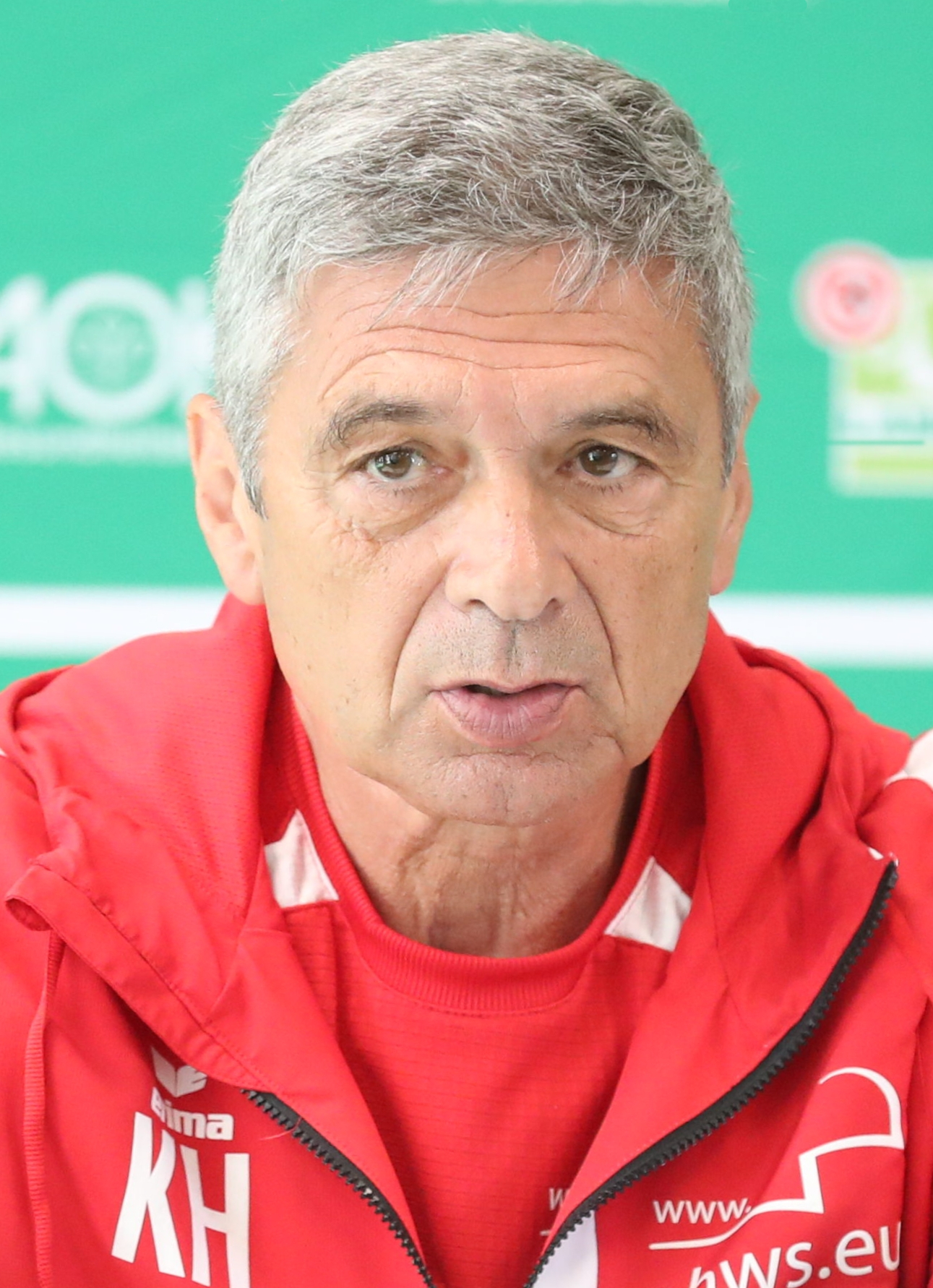
- Heine in 2022

Personal information
- Date of birth: 6 April 1955 (age 71)
- Place of birth: East Berlin, East Germany
- Position: Midfielder

Youth career
- 1963–1969: GSG Köpenick
- 1969–1973: Union Berlin

Senior career*
Years	Team	Apps	(Gls)
1973–1982	Union Berlin		
1983–1985	Stahl Brandenburg		
1985–1986	Union Berlin		

Managerial career
- 1988–1990: Union Berlin
- 1991: Hertha BSC
- 1991–1994: Hertha BSC (assistant)
- 1994–1995: Hertha BSC
- 1996–1997: Union Berlin
- 1997–1999: SV Babelsberg 03
- 2004–2007: Hertha BSC II
- 2007: Hertha BSC (caretaker)
- 2007–2013: Hertha BSC II
- 2009: Hertha BSC (caretaker)
- 2013–2016: Chemnitzer FC
- 2019–2023: VSG Altglienicke
- * Club domestic league appearances and goals

Karsten Heine (born 6 April 1955) is a German football manager and former player who most recently managed VSG Altglienicke.

== Managerial career ==
=== Union Berlin ===
Heine has managed 1. FC Union Berlin on two occasions. The first stint happened from January 1988 to April 1990 and the second stint happened from April 1996 to September 1997.

=== Hertha BSC and Hertha BSC II ===
Heine has also managed Hertha BSC and Hertha BSC II. Heine managed Hertha BSC II from July 1990 to August 1992, from January 2004 to April 2007, and from July 2007 to June 2013.

=== Chemnitzer FC ===
Chemnitzer FC hired Heine in October 2013. He was sacked on 2 March 2016.

=== VSG Altglienicke ===
In June 2019, Heine became new manager of VSG Altglienicke. He was sacked on 7 November 2023.

== Managerial record ==
As of 4 November 2023

Team	From	To	Record					
Team	From	To	G	W	D	L	Win %	Ref.
Union Berlin	1 January 1988	9 April 1990	—					
Hertha BSC II	1 July 1990	11 August 1992	—					
Hertha BSC	28 May 1991	30 June 1991	3	1	0	2	33.33	
Hertha BSC	20 October 1993	23 October 1993	1	0	0	1	0.00	
Hertha BSC	23 March 1994	31 December 1995	70	23	23	24	32.86	
Union Berlin	11 April 1996	25 September 1997	53	29	9	15	54.72	
Babelsberg 03	28 October 1997	8 October 1999	66	18	23	25	27.27	
Hertha BSC II	1 January 2004	10 April 2007	118	49	25	44	41.53	
Hertha BSC	10 April 2007	30 June 2007	6	3	0	3	50.00	
Hertha BSC II	1 July 2007	30 June 2013	194	83	41	70	42.78	
Hertha BSC	29 September 2009	3 October 2009	1	0	0	1	0.00	
Chemnitzer FC	8 October 2013	2 March 2016	93	37	24	32	39.78	
VSG Altglienicke	1 July 2019	7 November 2023	142	86	22	34	60.56	
Total			747	329	167	251	44.04	—
