= Dirk Lottner =

German footballer (born 1972)

Personal information
- Date of birth: 4 March 1972 (age 54)
- Place of birth: Cologne, West Germany
- Height: 1.87 m (6 ft 2 in)
- Position: Midfielder

Youth career
- –1985: Rot-Weiß Zollstock
- 1989–1990: Fortuna Köln

Senior career*
Years	Team	Apps	(Gls)
1990–1997	Fortuna Köln	231	(41)
1997–1998	Bayer Leverkusen	17	(2)
1999–2004	1. FC Köln	161	(54)
2004–2006	MSV Duisburg	41	(3)
2006–2007	1. FC Köln II		

Managerial career
- 2011–2012: 1. FC Köln II
- 2012–2014: 1. FC Köln II
- 2014: Hansa Rostock
- 2016–2019: 1. FC Saarbrücken
- 2020–2021: Energie Cottbus
- 2025: Hannover 96 (interim)
- * Club domestic league appearances and goals

Dirk Lottner (born 4 March 1972) is a German football manager and a former player who is currently the manager of Hannover 96's under-19 team.

== Coaching career ==
From 2016 to 2019, he coached 1. FC Saarbrücken.

On 11 September 2020, he was hired by Energie Cottbus.

Ahead of the 2022–23 season, Lottner was hired to coach the under-19 team of Hannover 96. On 23 April 2025, he was named interim coach for the club's first team together with Lars Barlemann and Christian Schulz until the end of the 2024–25 season.

== Honours ==
Bayer Leverkusen

- Bundesliga runner-up: 1998–99
