= Maik Walpurgis =

German football coach and manager

Personal information
- Date of birth: 9 October 1973 (age 53)
- Place of birth: Herford, West Germany

Managerial career
- Years: Team
- 2001–2002: SV Enger-Westerenger
- 2002–2003: FC Gütersloh
- 2003–2005: Arminia Bielefeld II
- 2008–2013: Sportfreunde Lotte
- 2013–2015: VfL Osnabrück
- 2016–2017: FC Ingolstadt
- 2018–2019: Dynamo Dresden

Maik Walpurgis (born 9 October 1973) is a German football coach who last managed Dynamo Dresden.

== Coaching career ==
Walpurgis played football at youth level, but was unable to continue his playing career at the age of 18 after repeated injuries and instead embarked on a career as a coach. Walpurgis initially took up coaching at youth level before moving to senior football at the age of 26.

From 1992 to 1998, he worked as a youth coach for SC Herford. He then coached the under-19 team of second division club FC Gütersloh, but due to the club's insolvency, he left in December 1999. From January 2000, he coached his first senior team, SV Enger-Westerenger, which played in the Landesliga Westfalen, at the time the sixth tier of German football. Under his leadership, the team won the league and was promoted to the Westfalenliga in 2001. In the summer of 2002, he returned to Gütersloh, this time coaching the first team. Before the 2003–04 season, he was appointed as the coach of Arminia Bielefeld's second team. In his first year at the club, his team became Oberliga Westfalen champions and were promoted to the Regionalliga Nord. His contract at Bielefeld was dated until June 2005, but Walpurgis resigned in January 2005 as he felt he did not have the full support of the club.

In September 2008, Walpurgis became coach of Sportfreunde Lotte, playing in the Regionalliga West. His club competed for the top spots in the league in the following years and finished in a top three position four seasons in a row. In the 2012-13 season, Walpurgis and Lotte crowned themselves champions of the Regionalliga West, but were defeated by RB Leipzig in the subsequent promotion play-offs for the 3. Liga. Walpurgis wanted to join to third-division club VfL Osnabrück for the 2013–14 season, but Lotte did not agree to release their coach from his contract. This led to a legal dispute that was eventually settled by an agreement between the clubs, and Walpurgis was able to join Osnabrück. Osnabrück parted ways with Walpurgis in August 2015 after a poor start to the 2015–16 season.

Bundesliga club Ingolstadt 04, hired Walpurgis on 12 November 2016 as the successor to Markus Kauczinski, who had been sacked shortly before. However, Walpurgis was unable to prevent the club from being relegated to the second tier. He was sacked by Ingolstadt on 22 August 2017 after an unsuccessful start to the 2017–18 season.

On 11 September 2018, Walpurgis was appointed as the new head coach of Dynamo Dresden, succeeding Uwe Neuhaus. His tenure ended after 166 days, as the club parted ways with him on 24 February 2019.
