= Thomas Stratos =

German-Greek footballer and coach

Personal information
- Date of birth: 9 October 1966 (age 60)
- Place of birth: Greece
- Positions: Defender; midfielder

Youth career
- SC Bad Salzuflen
- SuS Lage

Senior career*
| Years | Team | Apps | (Gls) |
| –1988 | FC Gütersloh | | |
| 1988–1990 | Arminia Bielefeld | 79 | (10) |
| 1990–1992 | Hamburger SV | 43 | (3) |
| 1992–1994 | 1. FC Saarbrücken | 10 | (0) |
| 1994–2000 | Arminia Bielefeld | 167 | (9) |
| 2001–2002 | 1. FC Saarbrücken | 19 | (0) |
| Total | | 318 | (22) |

Managerial career
- 2004–2006: SC Verl (assistant)
- 2006–2007: FC Gütersloh
- 2007–2008: Hammer SpVg
- 2008–2012: SC Wiedenbrück
- 2013–2014: Jahn Regensburg
- 2014–2016: BFC Dynamo
- 2016: Iraklis (assistant)
- 2016–2018: Greece (assistant)
- 2019–2020: Fortuna Köln
- 2019–2020: Fortuna Köln (sporting director)
- 2020–2021: Al-Ain (assistant)
- 2022: Irodotos
- 2023–2024: VfL Holsen
- 2024: SC Wiedenbrück
- * Club domestic league appearances and goals

Thomas Stratos (Greek: Θωμάς Στράτος; born 9 October 1966) is a German-Greek football coach and a former player.

== Career statistics ==
As of 25 October 2022

| Team | From | To | Record | | | | | Ref. |
| Team | From | To | G | W | D | L | Win % | Ref. |
|---|---|---|---|---|---|---|---|---|
| (Germany) FC Gütersloh | 1 July 2006 | 10 April 2007 | 26 | 14 | 6 | 6 | 53.85 | |
| (Germany) Hammer SpVg | 27 July 2007 | 30 June 2008 | 34 | 14 | 7 | 13 | 41.18 | |
| (Germany) SC Wiedenbrück | 1 July 2008 | 30 June 2012 | 113 | 50 | 26 | 37 | 44.25 | |
| (Germany) Jahn Regensburg | 11 June 2013 | 30 June 2014 | 41 | 13 | 13 | 15 | 31.71 | |
| (Germany) BFC Dynamo | 10 November 2014 | 30 June 2016 | 60 | 32 | 13 | 15 | 53.33 | |
| (Germany) Fortuna Köln | 1 July 2019 | 30 June 2020 | 24 | 8 | 6 | 10 | 33.33 | |
| (Greece) Irodotos | 27 September 2022 | 25 October 2022 | 0 | 0 | 0 | 0 | – | |
| Total | | | 298 | 131 | 71 | 96 | 43.96 | – |
