= Horst Steffen =

German footballer and manager (born 1969)

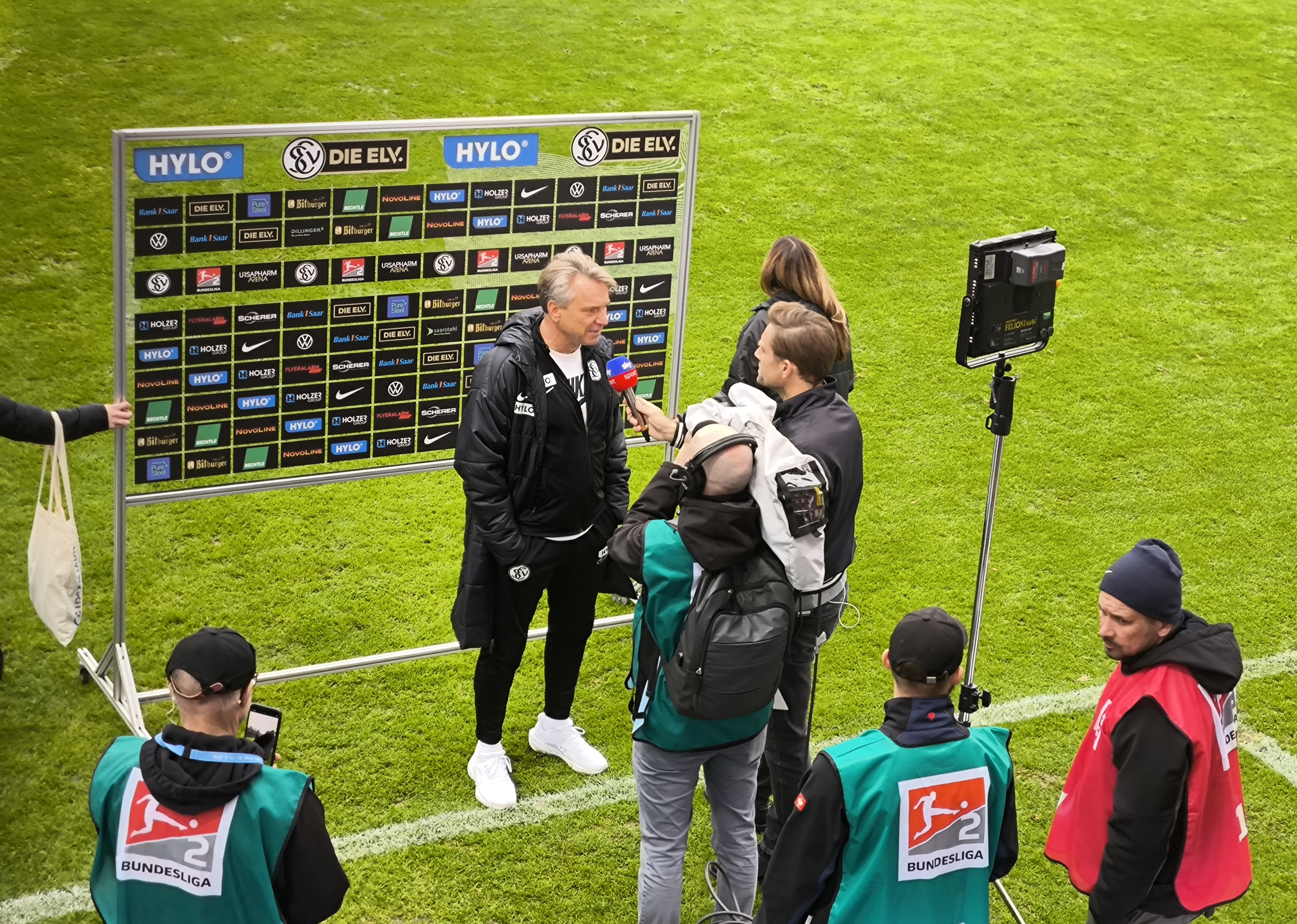
- Steffen during an interview as SV Elversberg manager in 2024

Personal information
- Date of birth: 3 March 1969 (age 57)
- Place of birth: Meerbusch, West Germany
- Height: 1.82 m (6 ft 0 in)
- Positions: Midfielder; defender

Youth career
- 1975–1988: Bayer Uerdingen

Senior career*
| Years | Team | Apps | (Gls) |
| 1988–1991 | Bayer Uerdingen | 90 | (7) |
| 1991–1993 | Borussia Mönchengladbach | 20 | (0) |
| 1993–1996 | Bayer Uerdingen | 96 | (14) |
| 1996–2003 | MSV Duisburg | 76 | (2) |
| Total | | 282 | (23) |

International career
| 1988–1990 | West Germany U21 | 10 | (0) |

Managerial career
- 2003–2006: SC Kapellen-Erft
- 2006–2008: MSV Duisburg II
- 2013–2015: Stuttgarter Kickers
- 2015–2016: Preußen Münster
- 2017–2018: Chemnitzer FC
- 2018–2025: SV Elversberg
- 2025–2026: Werder Bremen
- * Club domestic league appearances and goals

Horst Steffen (born 3 March 1969) is a German football coach and a former player. He last managed Werder Bremen.

== Club career ==
Steffen began his youth career at Bayer Uerdingen in 1975 and was part of the U19 team that won the German championship in 1987. He made his professional debut for the club in 1988 and played 90 Bundesliga matches until 1991. In 1991, he joined Borussia Mönchengladbach, making 24 competitive appearances over two seasons and scoring once in the 1992–93 DFB-Pokal. After limited opportunities under coach Bernd Krauss, he returned to Uerdingen in 1993, where he played for three more years. In 1996, Steffen moved to MSV Duisburg, where he spent three seasons in the Bundesliga (36 matches) and three in the 2. Bundesliga (40 matches).

== International career ==
Steffen made ten appearances for the West Germany U21.

== Managerial career ==
=== Early career ===
Steffen coached SC Kapellen-Erft, leading them to promotion to the Oberliga Niederrhein in the 2003–04 season. He later worked with the U23 and U19 teams at MSV Duisburg, and with Borussia Mönchengladbach's U17 and U19 teams.

=== Stuttgarter Kickers ===
On 30 September 2013, he became head coach of 3. Liga side Stuttgarter Kickers. His contract, initially set to run until 2015, was extended but terminated in November 2015 following poor results.

=== Preußen Münster and Chemnitzer FC ===
Steffen was appointed head coach of SC Preußen Münster in December 2015 but was dismissed in October 2016. He later joined Chemnitzer FC for the 2017–18 season, but was released in January 2018.

=== SV Elversberg ===
On 29 October 2018, Steffen took over SV Elversberg in the Regionalliga Südwest. He led the club to promotion to the 3. Liga in 2021–22 and then to the 2. Bundesliga in 2022–23. Under his guidance, the team finished 11th in their debut second-division season and 3rd in the following campaign, narrowly missing out on Bundesliga promotion after losing the play-offs against 1. FC Heidenheim.

=== Werder Bremen ===
On 29 May 2025, Steffen became the head coach of Bundesliga club SV Werder Bremen, signing a contract until 2028. He was sacked on 1 February 2026.

== Managerial statistics ==
As of 31 January 2026

Managerial record by team and tenure
| Nat | From | To | Record | | | | | Ref |
| Nat | From | To | G | W | D | L | Win % | Ref |
|---|---|---|---|---|---|---|---|---|
| MSV Duisburg II | 1 July 2006 | 30 June 2008 | 68 | 30 | 12 | 26 | 44.12 | |
| Stuttgarter Kickers | 29 September 2013 | 4 November 2015 | 89 | 38 | 24 | 27 | 42.70 | |
| Preußen Münster | 24 December 2015 | 4 October 2016 | 28 | 8 | 5 | 15 | 28.57 | |
| Chemnitzer FC | 1 July 2017 | 2 January 2018 | 23 | 5 | 4 | 14 | 21.74 | |
| SV Elversberg | 29 October 2018 | 29 May 2025 | 256 | 148 | 53 | 55 | 57.81 | |
| Werder Bremen | 29 May 2025 | 1 February 2026 | 21 | 4 | 7 | 10 | 19.05 | |
| Total | | | 485 | 233 | 105 | 147 | 48.04 | — |

== Honours ==
Player

Borussia Mönchengladbach

- DFB-Pokal runner-up: 1991–92

MSV Duisburg

- DFB-Pokal runner-up: 1997–98

Manager

SV Elversberg

- 3. Liga: 2022–23
- Regionalliga Südwest: 2021–22
