= 2023–24 SV Elversberg season =

SV Elversberg
2023–24 season
- Manager: Horst Steffen
- Stadium: Waldstadion an der Kaiserlinde
- 2. Bundesliga: 11th
- DFB-Pokal: First round
- Top goalscorer: League: Luca Schnellbacher (8); All: Luca Schnellbacher (8)
Home colours	Away colours	Third colours

The 2023–24 season was SV Elversberg's 117th season in existence and first ever in the 2. Bundesliga. They also competed in the DFB-Pokal.

== Players ==
=== First-team squad ===
As of 1 September 2023

Note: Flags indicate national team as defined under FIFA eligibility rules; some limited exceptions apply. Players may hold more than one non-FIFA nationality.

No.	Pos.	Nation	Player
1	GK	GER	Frank Lehmann
4	DF	GER	Kevin Conrad (captain)
5	DF	GER	Frederik Jäkel (on loan from RB Leipzig)
6	MF	GER	Patryk Dragon
7	MF	GER	Manuel Feil
8	MF	GER	Semih Sahin
9	FW	GER	Dominik Martinović
10	MF	GER	Jannik Rochelt
11	MF	GER	Luca Dürholtz
13	DF	POR	Marcel Correia
14	DF	GER	Robin Fellhauer
17	MF	GER	Paul Wanner (on loan from Bayern Munich)
19	DF	GER	Lukas Pinckert

No.	Pos.	Nation	Player
20	GK	AUT	Nicolas Kristof
21	MF	GER	Paul Stock
22	MF	GER	Joseph Boyamba
23	MF	GER	Carlo Sickinger
24	FW	GER	Luca Schnellbacher
25	MF	GER	Sebastian Saftig
26	DF	GER	Arne Sicker
28	GK	GER	Tim Boss
29	FW	DEN	Wahid Faghir (on loan from VfB Stuttgart)
30	FW	CIV	Kevin Koffi
31	MF	GER	Thore Jacobsen
33	DF	GER	Maurice Neubauer
35	DF	AUT	Nico Antonitsch

=== Out on loan ===
Note: Flags indicate national team as defined under FIFA eligibility rules; some limited exceptions apply. Players may hold more than one non-FIFA nationality.

No.	Pos.	Nation	Player
—	MF	GER	Daniel Pantschenko (at Union Titus Pétange until 30 June 2024)

== Transfers ==
=== In ===
Pos.	Player	Transferred from	Fee	Date	Source
DF	(Germany) Arne Sicker	(Germany) SV Sandhausn	Free	1 July 2023	
FW	(Germany) Dominik Martinović	(Germany) Waldhof Mannheim	Free	1 July 2023	
FW	(Denmark) Wahid Faghir	(Germany) VfB Stuttgart	Loan	19 July 2023	
MF	(Germany) Paul Wanner	(Germany) Bayern Munich	Loan	1 September 2023	

=== Out ===
Pos.	Player	Transferred from	Fee	Date	Source

== Pre-season and friendlies ==
Win Draw Loss

19 July 2023 Friendly	SV Sandhausen (Germany)	2–1	(Germany) SV Elversberg	Sandhausen
13:00 UTC+2				Stadium: BWT-Stadion am Hardtwald

22 July 2023 Friendly	Waldhof Mannheim (Germany)	0–2	(Germany) SV Elversberg	Frankenthal
15:00 UTC+2				Stadium: Sportanlage DJK Sportfreunde 1924 Eppstein-Flomersheim

13 October 2023 Friendly	Darmstadt 98 (Germany)	4–2	(Germany) SV Elversberg	Darmstadt
13:00 UTC+2				Stadium: Merck-Stadion am Böllenfalltor

17 November 2023 Friendly	SV Elversberg (Germany)	1–0	(France) Metz	Spiesen-Elversberg
14:00 UTC+1	Rochelt 61'			Stadium: Waldstadion an der Kaiserlinde

== Competitions ==
=== Overall record ===
Competition	First match	Last match	Starting round	Final position	Record							
Competition	First match	Last match	Starting round	Final position	Pld	W	D	L	GF	GA	GD	Win %
2. Bundesliga	28 July 2023	19 May 2024	Matchday 1	11th	34	12	7	15	49	63	−14	35.29
DFB-Pokal	12 August 2023		First round	First round	1	0	0	1	0	1	−1	0.00
Total					35	12	7	16	49	64	−15	34.29

Source: Soccerway

=== 2. Bundesliga ===
==== League table ====
Pos	Team	Pld	W	D	L	GF	GA	GD	Pts
9	Hertha BSC	34	13	9	12	69	59	+10	48
10	Schalke 04	34	12	7	15	53	60	−7	43
11	SV Elversberg	34	12	7	15	49	63	−14	43
12	1. FC Nürnberg	34	11	7	16	43	64	−21	40
13	1. FC Kaiserslautern	34	11	6	17	59	64	−5	39

Source: DFB
Rules for classification: 1) Points; 2) Goal difference; 3) Goals scored; 4) Head-to-head results; 5) Head-to-head away goals scored; 6) Away goals scored; 7) Play-off.
(Rules 4–6 only apply after home and away matches have been played between the tied teams.)

==== Results summary ====
Overall								Home						Away					
Pld	W	D	L	GF	GA	GD	Pts	W	D	L	GF	GA	GD	W	D	L	GF	GA	GD
34	12	7	15	49	63	−14	43	6	4	7	23	28	−5	6	3	8	26	35	−9

Last updated: 19 May 2024.
Source: DFB

==== Results by round ====
Round	1	2	3	4	5	6	7	8	9	10	11	12	13	14	15	16	17	18	19	20	21	22	23	24	25	26	27	28	29	30	31	32	33	34
Ground	A	H	A	H	A	H	A	H	A	H	A	H	A	H	A	H	A	H	A	H	A	H	A	H	A	H	A	H	A	H	A	H	A	H
Result	D	L	L	L	W	W	W	D	D	W	W	L	W	W	L	L	L	D	L	W	D	W	L	L	W	L	L	D	W	D	L	W	L	L
Position	8	12	16	18	15	13	8	10	11	7	7	10	9	6	6	8	9	10	12	9	9	9	10	11	10	11	11	11	10	10	10	10	11	11

Updated to match(es) played on 21 January 2024. Source: DFB
A = Away; H = Home; W = Win; D = Draw; L = Loss

==== Matches ====
The league fixtures were unveiled on 30 June 2023.

29 July 2023 1	Hannover 96	2–2	SV Elversberg	Hannover
13:00 UTC+2	Teuchert 42' (pen.); Tresoldi 54'	Report	Correia 22'; Faghir 38'	Stadium: Niedersachsenstadion; Attendance: 29,200; Referee: Alexander Sather

5 August 2023 2	SV Elversberg	1–2	Hansa Rostock	Saarbrücken
13:00 UTC+2	Sickinger 56'	Report	Perea 90+10', 90+13'	Stadium: Ludwigsparkstadion; Attendance: 8,371; Referee: Robert Kampka

18 August 2023 3	1. FC Kaiserslautern	3–2	SV Elversberg	Kaiserslautern
18:30 UTC+2	Kraus 21' (pen.); Ache 68'; Zimmer 79'; Tachie (yellow card) 73'; Ritter (yellow card) 89'; Opoku (yellow card) 90+7'	Report	Feil 47'; Şahin 62', (yellow card) 90+5'	Stadium: Fritz-Walter-Stadion; Referee: Patrick Ittrich

26 August 2023 4	SV Elversberg	0–5	Fortuna Düsseldorf	Spiesen-Elversberg
13:00 UTC+2		Report	Klaus 11'; de Wijs 15'; Vermeij 42'; Tzolis 70' (pen.), 79'	Stadium: Waldstadion an der Kaiserlinde; Attendance: 8,366; Referee: Michael Bacher

3 September 2023 5	VfL Osnabrück	0–1	SV Elversberg	Osnabrück
13:30 UTC+2		Report	Faghir 79'	Stadium: Stadion an der Bremer Brücke; Attendance: 14,478; Referee: Christian Dingert

16 September 2023 6	SV Elversberg	2–1	Hamburger SV	Spiesen-Elversberg
13:00 UTC+2	Rochelt 9'; Schnellbacher 60'	Report	Heyer 89'	Stadium: Waldstadion an der Kaiserlinde; Attendance: 10,150; Referee: Patrick Schwengers

23 September 2023 7	SV Wehen Wiesbaden	0–2	SV Elversberg	Wiesbaden
13:00 UTC+2		Report	Jacobsen 20' (pen.); Faghir 77'	Stadium: Brita-Arena; Attendance: 7,526; Referee: Arne Aarnink

1 October 2023 8	SV Elversberg	1–1	SpVgg Greuther Fürth	Spiesen-Elversberg
13:30 UTC+2	Feil 9'	Report	Hrgota 14'	Stadium: Waldstadion an der Kaiserlinde; Attendance: 8,042; Referee: Tom Bauer

8 October 2023 9	Holstein Kiel	1–1	SV Elversberg	Kiel
13:30 UTC+2	Becker 44'	Report	Schnellbacher 70'	Stadium: Holstein-Stadion; Attendance: 12,675; Referee: Tobias Reichel

20 October 2023 10	SV Elversberg	3–0	Eintracht Braunschweig	Spiesen-Elversberg
18:30 UTC+2	Stock 20'; Wanner 43'; Boyamba 90+3'	Report		Stadium: Waldstadion an der Kaiserlinde; Attendance: 8,713; Referee: Robert Hartmann

29 October 2023 11	1. FC Magdeburg	1–2	SV Elversberg	Magdeburg
13:30 UTC+1	Krempicki 70'	Report	Rochelt 12'; Neubauer 35'	Stadium: MDCC-Arena; Attendance: 22,166; Referee: Lukas Benen

3 November 2023 12	SV Elversberg	0–2	FC St. Pauli	Spiesen-Elversberg
18:30 UTC+1		Report	Eggestein 16'; Hartel 31'	Stadium: Waldstadion an der Kaiserlinde; Attendance: 10,150; Referee: Alexander Sather

10 November 2023 13	Schalke 04	1–2	SV Elversberg	Gelsenkirchen
18:30 UTC+1	Karaman 35'	Report	Stock 7'; Rochelt 21'	Stadium: Veltins-Arena; Attendance: 61,110; Referee: Martin Petersen

25 November 2023 14	SV Elversberg	4–1	SC Paderborn 07	Spiesen-Elversberg
13:00 UTC+1	Schnellbacher 41', 50'; Stock 57'; Neubauer 60'	Report	Klaas 22'	Stadium: Waldstadion an der Kaiserlinde; Attendance: 8,126; Referee: Florian Heft

3 December 2023 15	Hertha BSC	5–1	SV Elversberg	Berlin
13:30	Gechter 12'; Niederlechner 23', 61', 67'; Kenny 71'	Report	Jacobsen 15'	Stadium: Olympiastadion; Attendance: 33,097; Referee: Sven Jablonski

10 December 2023 16	SV Elversberg	0–1	1. FC Nürnberg	Spiesen-Elversberg
13:30 UTC+1		Report	Hayashi 83'	Stadium: Waldstadion an der Kaiserlinde; Attendance: 8,150; Referee: Robert Hartmann

17 December 2023 17	Karlsruher SC	3–2	SV Elversberg	Karlsruhe
13:30 UTC+1	Burnić 6'; Zivzivadze 16'; Matanović 53'	Report	Wanner 29'; Schnellbacher 63'	Stadium: BBBank Wildpark; Attendance: 23,654; Referee: Martin Petersen

20 January 2024 18	SV Elversberg	2–2	Hannover 96	Spiesen-Elversberg
13:00 UTC+1	Rochelt 57'; Jäkel 60'	Report	Tresoldi 8', 69'	Stadium: Waldstadion an der Kaiserlinde; Attendance: 8,150; Referee: Robert Hartmann

27 January 2024 19	Hansa Rostock	2–1	SV Elversberg	Rostock
13:00 UTC+1	Dressel 69'; Pröger 90+2' (pen.)	Report	Schnellbacher 41'	Stadium: Ostseestadion; Attendance: 24,000; Referee: Florian Heft

4 February 2024 20	SV Elversberg	2–1	1. FC Kaiserslautern	Spiesen-Elversberg
13:30 UTC+1	Wanner 19'; Jacobsen 56' (pen.)	Report	Ache 45+7'	Stadium: Waldstadion an der Kaiserlinde; Attendance: 11,150; Referee: Deniz Aytekin

10 February 2024 21	Fortuna Düsseldorf	1–1	SV Elversberg	Düsseldorf
13:00 UTC+1	Jóhannesson 19'	Report	Boyamba 53'	Stadium: Merkur Spiel-Arena; Attendance: 31,034; Referee: Richard Hempel

18 February 2024 22	SV Elversberg	3–1	VfL Osnabrück	Spiesen-Elversberg
13:30 UTC+1	Feil 36'; Vandermersch 38'; Wanner 45+5'	Report	Gyamfi 52'	Stadium: Waldstadion an der Kaiserlinde; Attendance: 8,026; Referee: Patrick Schwengers

25 February 2024 23	Hamburger SV	1–0	SV Elversberg	Hamburg
13:30 UTC+1	Königsdörffer 53'	Report		Stadium: Volksparkstadion; Attendance: 54,190; Referee: Harm Osmers

3 March 2024 24	SV Elversberg	0–3	SV Wehen Wiesbaden	Spiesen-Elversberg
13:30 UTC+1		Report	Goppel 44'; Lee 49'; Iredale 84'	Stadium: Waldstadion an der Kaiserlinde; Attendance: 8,071; Referee: Alexander Sather

10 March 2024 25	Greuther Fürth	1–4	SV Elversberg	Fürth
13:30 UTC+1	Srbeny 61'	Report	Stock 25', 72', 82'; Martinović 87'	Stadium: Sportpark Ronhof; Attendance: 11,651; Referee: Christian Dingert

16 March 2024 26	SV Elversberg	0–2	Holstein Kiel	Spiesen-Elversberg
13:00 UTC+1		Report	Machino 39'; Sander 49'	Stadium: Waldstadion an der Kaiserlinde; Attendance: 8,184; Referee: Tom Bauer

30 March 2024 27	Eintracht Braunschweig	5–0	SV Elversberg	Braunschweig
13:00 UTC+1	Krauße 7'; Bičakčić 45+2'; Kuruçay 80' (pen.), 90+3'; Krüger 90+1'	Report		Stadium: Eintracht-Stadion; Attendance: 20,110; Referee: Bastian Dankert

6 April 2024 28	SV Elversberg	0–0	1. FC Magdeburg	Spiesen-Elversberg
13:00 UTC+2		Report		Stadium: Waldstadion an der Kaiserlinde; Attendance: 8,864; Referee: Patrick Ittrich

14 April 2024 29	FC St. Pauli	3–4	SV Elversberg	Hamburg
13:30 UTC+2	Eggestein 40'; Hartel 69'; Irvine 90+3'	Report	Neubauer 52'; Boyamba 70'; Wanner 81'; Vandermersch 83'	Stadium: Millerntor-Stadion; Attendance: 29,546; Referee: Tobias Reichel

19 April 2024 30	SV Elversberg	1–1	FC Schalke 04	Spiesen-Elversberg
18:30 UTC+2	Le Joncour 18'	Report	Topp 59'	Stadium: Waldstadion an der Kaiserlinde; Attendance: 10,000; Referee: Patrick Schwengers

27 April 2024 31	SC Paderborn 07	3–1	SV Elversberg	Paderborn
13:00 UTC+2	Grimaldi 54'; Obermair 61' (pen.); Conteh 75'	Report	Sickinger 51' (pen.)	Stadium: Home Deluxe Arena; Attendance: 12,004; Referee: Wolfgang Haslberger

5 May 2024 32	SV Elversberg	4–2	Hertha BSC	Spiesen-Elversberg
13:30 UTC+2	Schnellbacher 18', 54'; Wanner 65'; Koffi 88'	Report	Reese 27'; Dárdai 62'	Stadium: Waldstadion an der Kaiserlinde; Attendance: 9,502; Referee: Florian Lechner

11 May 2024 33	1. FC Nürnberg	3–0	SV Elversberg	Nürnberg
13:00 UTC+2	Lohkemper 43'; Gyamerah 52' (pen.); Uzun 64'	Report		Stadium: Max-Morlock-Stadion; Attendance: 34,031; Referee: Max Burda

19 May 2024 34	SV Elversberg	0–3	Karlsruher SC	Spiesen-Elversberg
15:30 UTC+2		Report	Zivzivadze 52'; Heise 56'; Stindl 79'	Stadium: Waldstadion an der Kaiserlinde; Attendance: 9,502; Referee: Florian Exner

=== DFB-Pokal ===
12 August 2023 First round	SV Elversberg	0–1	Mainz 05	Spiesen-Elversberg
18:00 UTC+2	Feil (yellow card) 70' (yellow-red card); Neubauer (yellow card) 80'	Report	Ajorque 73' (pen.); Bell (yellow card) 90+2'; Van den Berg (yellow card) 90+6'	Stadium: Waldstadion an der Kaiserlinde; Attendance: 10,000; Referee: Martin Petersen
