= 2024–25 SV Elversberg season =

SV Elversberg
2024–25 season
- Head coach: Horst Steffen
- Stadium: Waldstadion an der Kaiserlinde
- 2. Bundesliga: 3rd
- DFB-Pokal: Second round
Home colours	Away colours	Third colours

The 2024–25 season was the 118th season in the history of SV Elversberg, and the club's second consecutive season in the 2. Bundesliga. In addition to the domestic league, the club participated in the DFB-Pokal.

== Transfers ==
=== In ===
Pos.	Player	Transferred from	Fee	Date	Source
DF	(Germany) Elias Baum	(Germany) Eintracht Frankfurt	Loan	1 July 2024	
DF	(Germany) Maximilian Rohr	(Germany) SC Paderborn	Undisclosed	5 August 2024	
MF	(Germany) Muhammed Damar	(Germany) TSG Hoffenheim	Loan	20 August 2024	
MF	(Bulgaria) Lukas Petkov	(Germany) FC Augsburg	€500,000	21 August 2024	
MF	(Germany) Tom Zimmerschied	(Germany) Dynamo Dresden	Undisclosed	21 August 2024	

== Friendlies ==
30 June 2024 Friendly	SV Eintracht Trier (Germany)	1–3	(Germany) SV Elversberg	Osburg
14:00	König 66' (pen.)		Baum 19'; Rochelt 30'; Martinović 78'	Stadium: Sportplatz Osburg

12 July 2024 Friendly	Fortuna Sittard (Netherlands)	1–0	(Germany) SV Elversberg	Netherlands
15:25

20 July 2024 Friendly	SV Elversberg (Germany)	4–1	(Belgium) Eupen
14:00	34'; 64', 86'; 90' (pen.)		51'

24 July 2024 Friendly	TSG Hoffenheim (Germany)	3–1	(Germany) SV Elversberg
17:00

27 July 2024 Friendly	SV Elversberg (Germany)	1–1	(Germany) Viktoria Köln
14:00

5 January 2025 Friendly	SV Elversberg (Germany)	2–1	(Netherlands) FC Groningen
15:00

10 January 2025 Winter Break	SV Elversberg (Germany)	v	(Switzerland) Grasshopper Club Zurich	Marbella, Spain
16:00 CST (UTC+1)

== Competitions ==
=== Overall record ===
Competition	First match	Last match	Starting round	Record							
Competition	First match	Last match	Starting round	Pld	W	D	L	GF	GA	GD	Win %
2. Bundesliga	2–3 August 2024	18 May 2025	Matchday 1	9	3	4	2	15	10	+5	33.33
DFB-Pokal	18 August 2024		First round	1	1	0	0	7	0	+7	100.00
Total				10	4	4	2	22	10	+12	40.00

Last updated: 20 October 2024
Source: Soccerway

=== 2. Bundesliga ===
==== League table ====
Pos	Team	Pld	W	D	L	GF	GA	GD	Pts	Promotion, qualification or relegation
1	1. FC Köln (C, P)	34	18	7	9	53	38	+15	61	Promotion to Bundesliga
2	Hamburger SV (P)	34	16	11	7	78	44	+34	59	Promotion to Bundesliga
3	SV Elversberg	34	16	10	8	64	37	+27	58	Qualification for promotion play-offs
4	SC Paderborn	34	15	10	9	56	46	+10	55	
5	1. FC Magdeburg	34	14	11	9	64	52	+12	53	

Source: Bundesliga
Rules for classification: 1) Points; 2) Goal difference; 3) Goals scored; 4) Head-to-head results; 5) Head-to-head away goals scored; 6) Away goals scored; 7) Play-off.
(Rules 4–6 only apply after home and away matches have been played between the tied teams.)
(C) Champions; (P) Promoted

==== Results summary ====
Overall								Home						Away					
Pld	W	D	L	GF	GA	GD	Pts	W	D	L	GF	GA	GD	W	D	L	GF	GA	GD
9	3	4	2	15	10	+5	13	2	1	1	8	5	+3	1	3	1	7	5	+2

Last updated: 20 October 2024.

==== Results by round ====
Round	1	2	3	4	5	6	7	8	9
Ground	A	H	A	H	A	H	A	H	A
Result	D	D	L	W	D	L	W	W	D
Position	9	12	14	11	12	12	9	8	8

Updated to match(es) played on 20 October 2024. Source:
A = Away; H = Home; W = Win; D = Draw; L = Loss

==== Matches ====
The match schedule was released on 4 July 2024.

3 August 2024 1	1. FC Magdeburg	0–0	SV Elversberg	Magdeburg
13:00 UTC+2		Report		Stadium: MDCC-Arena; Attendance: 21,469; Referee: Florian Heft

10 August 2024 2	SV Elversberg	2–2	1. FC Köln	Spiesen-Elversberg
13:00 UTC+2	Asllani 46'; Schmahl 62'	Report	Huseinbašić 22'; Hübers 84'	Stadium: Waldstadion an der Kaiserlinde; Attendance: 9,502; Referee: Tom Bauer

23 August 2024 3	Karlsruher SC	3–2	SV Elversberg	Karlsruhe
18:30 UTC+2	Günther 18'; Schleusener 48'; Hunziker 75'	Report	Schnellbacher 30'; Asllani 60'	Stadium: Wildparkstadion; Attendance: 26,838; Referee: Felix Prigan

31 August 2024 4	SV Elversberg	4–0	SV Darmstadt 98	Spiesen-Elversberg
13:00 UTC+2	Schnellbacher 5'; Asllani 20', 59'; Gerezgiher 90+2'	Report		Stadium: Waldstadion an der Kaiserlinde; Attendance: 9,443; Referee: Lukas Benen

15 September 2024 5	Greuther Fürth	0–0	SV Elversberg	Fürth
13:30 UTC+2		Report		Stadium: Sportpark Ronhof; Attendance: 10,877; Referee: Eric Weisbach

22 September 2024 6	SV Elversberg	1–3	SSV Ulm 1846	Spiesen-Elversberg
13:30 UTC+2	Schnellbacher 62'	Report	Reichert 28' (pen.); Higl 60'; Strompf 77'	Stadium: Waldstadion an der Kaiserlinde; Attendance: 8,471; Referee: Patrick Schwengers

29 September 2024 7	Hertha BSC	1–4	SV Elversberg	Berlin
13:30 UTC+2	Cuisance 60'	Report	Şahin 4' (pen.), 65' (pen.); Schnellbacher 30'; Damar 52'	Stadium: Olympiastadion; Attendance: 36,500; Referee: Nicolas Winter

5 October 2024 8	SV Elversberg	1–0	1. FC Kaiserslautern	Spiesen-Elversberg
13:00 UTC+2	Damar 66'	Report		Stadium: Waldstadion an der Kaiserlinde; Attendance: 9,502; Referee: Lars Erbst

19 October 2024 9	Preußen Münster	1–1	SV Elversberg	Münster
13:00 UTC+2	Mees 20'	Report	Fellhauer 84'	Stadium: Preußenstadion; Attendance: 11,507; Referee: Wolfgang Haslberger

26 October 2024 10	SV Elversberg	4–2	Hamburger SV	Spiesen-Elversberg
13:00 UTC+2	Asllani 40', 53'; Schnellbacher 63'; Fellhauer 90+6'	Report	Selke 6', 83'	Stadium: Waldstadion an der Kaiserlinde; Attendance: 9,048; Referee: Dr. Robert Kampka

2 November 2024 11	Jahn Regensburg	1–0	SV Elversberg	Regensburg
13:00 UTC+2	Ganaus 16'	Report		Stadium: Jahnstadion Regensburg; Attendance: 9,502; Referee: Eric Weisbach

10 November 2024 12	SV Elversberg	3–1	Hannover 96	Elversberg
13:30 CET	Elias Baum 10' (yellow card) 38'; Asllani 45+5'; Damar 48'	Report	Kunze (yellow card) 23'; Tresoldi 90+1'	Stadium: Waldstadion an der Kaiserlinde; Attendance: 9,337; Referee: (Germany) Florian Lechner

23 November 2024 13	Fortuna Düsseldorf	0–2	SV Elversberg	Düsseldorf
13:00 CET	Hoffmann (yellow card) 34'; Sobottka (yellow card) 74'	Report	Asllani 58'; Petkov 65' (yellow card) 79'	Stadium: Merkur Spiel-Arena; Attendance: 52,000; Referee: (Germany) Tom Bauer

30 November 2024 14	SV Elversberg	1–3	Paderborn	Elversberg
13:00 CET	Damar 27' (yellow card) 75'; Rohr (yellow card) 79'; Asllani (yellow card) 90+3'	Report	Curda (yellow card) 39' (goal) 45+3'; Kostons 63'; Brackelmann 80'	Stadium: Waldstadion an der Kaiserlinde; Attendance: 8,922; Referee: (Germany) Nicolas Winter

6 December 2024 15	SV Elversberg	2–1	1. FC Nürnberg	Elversberg
18:30 CET	Zimmerschied 44'; Damar 53'; Pinckert (yellow card) 90+2'; Paul Stock (yellow card) 90+4'	Report	Castrop 14' (yellow card) 69'; Emreli (yellow card) 52'; Karafiát (yellow card) 77'	Stadium: Waldstadion an der Kaiserlinde; Attendance: 9,323; Referee: (Germany) Michael Bacher

15 December 2024 16	Eintracht Braunschweig	0–3	SV Elversberg	Braunschweig
13:30 CET	Max Marie (yellow card) 43'; Ivanov (yellow card) 44'; Kaufmann (yellow card) 86'; Bičakčić (yellow card) 90'	Report	Asllani 62' 78' (yellow card) 86'; Damar (yellow card) 65'; Sickinger (yellow card) 67'; Neubauer 90+1'	Stadium: Eintracht-Stadion; Attendance: 18,308; Referee: (Germany) Richard Hempel

20 December 2024 17	SV Elversberg	1–4	FC Schalke 04	Elversberg
18:30 CET	Sickinger 25'; Boss (yellow card) 56'; Pinckert (yellow card) 81'; Elias Baum (yellow card) 83'	Report	Karaman 11'; Murkin (yellow card) 14'; Sylla 55' 75'; Schallenberg 67'	Stadium: Waldstadion an der Kaiserlinde; Attendance: 9,502; Referee: (Germany) Eric Weisbach

19 January 2025 18	SV Elversberg	2–5	Magdeburg	Elversberg
13:30 CET	Schnellbacher 3'; Petkov 36'; Frederik Schmahl (red card) 43'; Neubauer (yellow card) 81'; Semih Sahin (yellow card) 90'	Report	Kaars 46' 70' 90+1'; Atik (yellow card) 63'; Mathisen (yellow card) 66'; Amaechi 77'; El Hankouri 82' (pen.)	Stadium: Waldstadion an der Kaiserlinde; Attendance: 9,351; Referee: (Germany) Lars Erbst

25 January 2025 19	Köln	1–0	SV Elversberg	Köln

31 January 2025 20	SV Elversberg	2–2	Karlsruhe	Elversberg

8 February 2025 21	Darmstadt	0–3	SV Elversberg	Darmstadt

15 February 2025 22	SV Elversberg	2–0	SpVgg Greuther Fürth	Elversberg

22 February 2025 23	Ulm	0–0	SV Elversberg	Ulm

2 March 2025 24	SV Elversberg	4–0	Hertha BSC	Elversberg

7 March 2025 25	Kaiserslautern	1–1	SV Elversberg	Kaiserslautern

15 March 2025 26	SV Elversberg	0–1	Preußen Münster	Elversberg

28 March 2025 27	Hamburger SV	0–0	SV Elversberg	Hamburg

6 April 2025 28	SV Elversberg	6–0	Jahn Regensburg	Elversberg

12 April 2025 29	Hannover 96	1–3	SV Elversberg	Hannover

19 April 2025 30	SV Elversberg	1–1	Fortuna Düsseldorf	Elversberg
	Sickinger 80' (pen.)		Jóhannesson 73'	Stadium: Waldstadion an der Kaiserlinde

=== DFB-Pokal ===
18 August 2024 First round	VfV 06 Hildesheim	0–7	SV Elversberg	Hildesheim
15:30 UTC+2		Report	Schnellbacher 17'; Fellhauer 32'; Schulze 43' (o.g.); Stock 51'; Schmahl 62'; Sickinger 76'; Boyamba 78'	Stadium: Friedrich-Ebert-Stadion; Attendance: 5,186; Referee: Assad Nouhoum

29 October 2024 Second round	Bayer Leverkusen	3–0	SV Elversberg	Leverkusen
18:00 UTC+1	Schick 2' 9'			Stadium: BayArena; Attendance: 30,000; Referee: Benjamin Brand
