= 2026–27 SV Elversberg season =

SV Elversberg
2026–27 season
- President: Dominik Holzer
- Head coach: Vincent Wagner
- Stadium: Waldstadion an der Kaiserlinde
- DFB-Pokal: Second round
Home colours	Away colours	Third colours

The 2026–27 season is the 120th season in the history of Sportvereinigung 07 Elversberg and their first-ever appearance in the Bundesliga, following promotion from the 2. Bundesliga in the previous season. The club is also competing in the DFB-Pokal.

== Squad statistics ==
As of match played 6 November 2026

No.	Pos	Nat	Player	Total		Bundesliga		DFB-Pokal	
No.	Pos	Nat	Player	Apps	Goals	Apps	Goals	Apps	Goals
1	GK	(Germany) GER	Frank Lehmann	0	0	0+0	0	0+0	0
2	DF	(Thailand) THA	Nicholas Mickelson	6	0	0+5	0	0+1	0
3	DF	(France) FRA	Florian Le Joncour	4	0	0+2	0	2+0	0
4	DF	(Germany) GER	Luis Seifert	0	0	0+0	0	0+0	0
6	MF	(Guinea) GUI	Amara Condé	5	0	0+3	0	1+1	0
7	MF	(Germany) GER	Maurice Krattenmacher	10	4	4+5	4	0+1	0
8	MF	(Poland) POL	Łukasz Poręba	11	0	9+0	0	2+0	0
9	FW	(Germany) GER	Noel Futkeu (on loan from Eintracht Frankfurt)	8	1	1+6	1	1+0	0
10	MF	(Germany) GER	Noah Darvich (on loan from VfB Stuttgart)	6	0	3+2	0	1+0	0
11	MF	(Germany) GER	Jason Ceka	0	0	0+0	0	0+0	0
12	GK	(Germany) GER	Elias Etringer	0	0	0+0	0	0+0	0
15	MF	(Germany) GER	Raif Adam	4	0	0+4	0	0+0	0
16	FW	(Germany) GER	Luca Pfeiffer	0	0	0+0	0	0+0	0
17	MF	(Germany) GER	Frederik Schmahl	5	1	1+3	1	1+0	0
19	DF	(Germany) GER	Lukas Pinckert (captain)	10	0	9+0	0	1+0	0
20	GK	(Austria) AUT	Nicolas Kristof	11	0	9+0	0	2+0	0
21	DF	(Germany) GER	Lasse Günther	11	1	9+0	1	2+0	0
24	FW	(Germany) GER	Luca Schnellbacher	5	1	0+3	0	1+1	1
25	MF	(Bulgaria) BUL	Lukas Petkov	11	2	9+0	2	2+0	0
26	DF	(Germany) GER	Luca Sirch	10	0	3+5	0	1+1	0
28	GK	(Germany) GER	Tim Boss	0	0	0+0	0	0+0	0
29	MF	(Germany) GER	Tom Zimmerschied	1	0	1+0	0	0+0	0
30	DF	(Ghana) GHA	Jan Gyamerah	7	0	6+0	0	1+0	0
31	DF	(Germany) GER	Maximilian Rohr	10	1	9+0	1	1+0	0
39	MF	(United States) USA	Cole Campbell	10	2	4+4	2	2+0	0
40	MF	(Germany) GER	Francis Onyeka (on loan from Bayer Leverkusen)	9	3	5+2	1	0+2	2
42	FW	(France) FRA	David Mokwa	11	2	8+1	2	0+2	0
43	DF	(Germany) GER	Felix Keidel	11	2	9+0	2	1+1	0

== Transfers ==
=== In ===
Pos.	Player	Transferred from	Fee	Date	Source
MF	(Germany) Noah Darvich	(Germany) VfB Stuttgart	Loan	1 July 2026	

== Pre-season ==
4 July 2026 Friendly	FC Gießen (Germany)	0–5	(Germany) SV Elversberg
16:00			Schnellbacher 10'; Pinckert 39'; Gerezgiher 45'; Mokwa 65', 72'

11 July 2026 Friendly	SV Elversberg (Germany)	1–1	(Switzerland) Thun
12:30

17 July 2026 Friendly	SV Elversberg (Germany)	1–2	(Germany) Viktoria Köln
18:00

25 July 2026 Friendly	NEC Nijmegen (Netherlands)	0–1	(Germany) SV Elversberg
14:00

8 August 2026 Friendly	RCD Mallorca (Spain)	1–1	(Germany) SV Elversberg	Palma de Mallorca
20:00	Sánchez 69'	Report	Rohr 65'	Stadium: Estadi Mallorca Son Moix

== Bundesliga ==
The Bundesliga fixtures were released on 2 July 2026.

Pos	Team	Pld	W	D	L	GF	GA	GD	Pts	Qualification or relegation
5	Bayer Leverkusen	9	5	1	3	20	17	+3	16	Qualification for the Europa League league phase (Note: The 2026–27 DFB-Pokal winners also qualify for the Europa League league stage (or the sixth-placed team if the DFB-Pokal winners finish in the top five of the Bundesliga). If the DFB-Pokal winners finish in the top six of the Bundesliga, the Conference League spot will be passed to the seventh-placed team.)
6	Werder Bremen	9	4	3	2	17	15	+2	15	Qualification for the Conference League play-off round
7	SV Elversberg	9	4	1	4	17	18	−1	13	
8	VfB Stuttgart	9	4	0	5	15	15	0	12	
9	TSG Hoffenheim	9	4	0	5	16	17	−1	12	

Updated to match(es) played on 8 November 2026. Source: Bundesliga
Rules for classification: 1) Points; 2) Goal difference; 3) Goals scored; 4) Head-to-head aggregate results; 5) Head-to-head away goals scored; 6) Away goals scored; 7) Play-off at neutral site.
(Rules 4–6 only apply after all home-and-away matches have been played between the tied teams. Rule 7 only applies after the completion of the season.)
Notes:

Round	1	2	3	4	5	6	7	8	9	10	11	12	13	14	15	16	17	18	19	20	21	22	23	24	25	26	27	28	29	30	31	32	33	34
Ground	H	A	H	A	A	H	A	H	A	H	A	H	A	H	A	H	A	A																
Result	W	W	L	D	L	W	L	W	L																									
Position	6	4	6	7	9	6	8	7	7																									
Points	3	6	6	7	7	10	10	13	13																									

Updated to match(es) played on 7 November 2026. Source: Bundesliga
A = Away; H = Home; W = Win; D = Draw; L = Loss; P = Postponed

29 August 2026 1	SV Elversberg	3–2	Bayer Leverkusen	Spiesen-Elversberg
15:30 CEST	Petkov 8'; Campbell 9', (yellow card) 41'; Rohr (yellow card) 29'; Mokwa 46'; Kristof (yellow card) 89'	Report	Maza (yellow card) 53'; Schick 77'; Medina (yellow card) 78'; Kofane 90+1'	Stadium: Waldstadion an der Kaiserlinde; Attendance: 9,307; Referee: Robert Hartmann

5 September 2026 2	Borussia Mönchengladbach	3–4	SV Elversberg	Mönchengladbach
15:30 CEST	Bolin 12', 44', (yellow card) 45+2'; Scally 56'; Nguefack (yellow card) 79'; Diks (yellow card) 89'	Report	Mokwa 29'; Krattenmacher 66', 90+2'; Keidel 80'; Condé (yellow card) 89'	Stadium: Borussia-Park; Attendance: 51,042; Referee: Martin Petersen

13 September 2026 3	SV Elversberg	1–2	Bayern Munich	Spiesen-Elversberg
17:30 CEST	Onyeka (yellow card) 7'; Krattenmacher 61'; Keidel (yellow card) 63'	Report	Karl 26'; Kane 72'	Stadium: Waldstadion an der Kaiserlinde; Attendance: 9,307; Referee: Sascha Stegemann

20 September 2026 4	Schalke 04	0–0	SV Elversberg	Gelsenkirchen
17:30 CEST	Kuruçay (yellow card) 62'	Report	Keidel (yellow card) 26'; Darvich (yellow card) 37'	Stadium: Arena AufSchalke; Attendance: 61,554; Referee: Robin Braun

10 October 2026 5	Union Berlin	1–0	SV Elversberg	Berlin
15:30 CEST	Haberer (yellow card) 7'; Skarke (yellow card) 21'; Burcu 81'	Report	Krattenmacher (yellow card) 90+2'	Stadium: Stadion An der Alten Försterei; Attendance: 22,012; Referee: Tobias Reichel

17 October 2026 6	SV Elversberg	4–3	FC Augsburg	Spiesen-Elversberg
15:30 CEST	Petkov (penalty missed) 4', 4'; Günther 7'; Rohr 28'; Keidel (yellow card) 54'; Pinckert (yellow card) 75'; Kristof (yellow card) 84'; Schmahl 89', (yellow card) 90+6'; Futkeu (penalty missed) 90+8'	Report	Massengo (yellow card) 30'; Ribeiro (yellow card) 30'; Rieder 45+9' (pen.); Matsima (yellow card) 52'; Gregoritsch 76' (pen.); Kömür 90'	Stadium: Waldstadion an der Kaiserlinde; Attendance: 9,307; Referee: Florian Exner

24 October 2026 7	RB Leipzig	4–0	SV Elversberg	Leipzig
15:30 CEST	Gomis 48'; Reitz (yellow card) 59'; Rômulo 66', 90+4'; Baumgartner 84'	Report	Günther (yellow card) 74'	Stadium: Red Bull Arena; Attendance: 41,129; Referee: Bastian Dankert

30 October 2026 8	SV Elversberg	4–1	Mainz 05	Spiesen-Elversberg
20:30 CET	Keidel 7'; Onyeka 26'; Krattenmacher 45+1'; Campbell 90+1'	Report	Mwene (yellow card) 4'; Da Costa (yellow card) 33'; Königsdörffer (yellow card) 75'; Posch (yellow card) 85' (yellow-red card) 90+5'; Hollerbach 90+2'	Stadium: Waldstadion an der Kaiserlinde; Attendance: 9,307; Referee: Sascha Stegemann

6 November 2026 9	Borussia Dortmund	2–1	SV Elversberg	Dortmund
15:30 CET	Nmecha (yellow card) 22', (goal) 55', 71'; Silva (yellow card) 60'; Anton (yellow card) 76'	Report	Günther (yellow card) 65'; Futkeu 81'	Stadium: Westfalenstadion; Attendance: 81,365; Referee: Harm Osmers

21 November 2026 10	SV Elversberg	–	SC Freiburg	Spiesen-Elversberg
15:30 CET		Report		Stadium: Waldstadion an der Kaiserlinde

28 November 2026 11	1. FC Köln	–	SV Elversberg	Cologne
15:30 CET		Report		Stadium: RheinEnergieStadion

6 December 2026 12	SV Elversberg	–	VfB Stuttgart	Spiesen-Elversberg
17:30 CET		Report		Stadium: Waldstadion an der Kaiserlinde

12 December 2026 13	SC Paderborn	–	SV Elversberg	Paderborn
15:30 CET		Report		Stadium: Home Deluxe Arena

19 December 2026 14	SV Elversberg	–	Hamburger SV	Spiesen-Elversberg
15:30 CET		Report		Stadium: Waldstadion an der Kaiserlinde

9 January 2027 15	TSG Hoffenheim	–	SV Elversberg	Sinsheim
15:30 CET		Report		Stadium: Rhein-Neckar-Arena

13 January 2027 16	SV Elversberg	–	Eintracht Frankfurt	Spiesen-Elversberg
18:30 CET		Report		Stadium: Waldstadion an der Kaiserlinde

17 January 2027 17	Werder Bremen	–	SV Elversberg	Bremen
15:30 CET		Report		Stadium: Weserstadion

24 January 2027 18	Bayer Leverkusen	–	SV Elversberg	Leverkusen
17:30 CET		Report		Stadium: BayArena

== DFB-Pokal ==
The first round draw was made on 6 June 2026. The second round draw was made on 5 September 2026.

22 August 2026 First round	MSV Duisburg	1–3	SV Elversberg	Duisburg
15:30 CEST	Coşkun (yellow card) 23'; Lobinger 54'	Report	Schnellbacher 38'; Keidel (yellow card) 71'; Onyeka 88', 90+1'	Stadium: MSV-Arena; Attendance: 22,662; Referee: Max Burda

27 October 2026 Second round	SV Elversberg	0–2	Darmstadt 98	Spiesen-Elversberg
20:45 CET	Günther (yellow card) 90+3'	Report	Kehl 6'; Smit (yellow card) 53', (goal) 56'; Petretta (yellow card) 72'	Stadium: Waldstadion an der Kaiserlinde; Attendance: 8,660; Referee: Daniel Schlager

== Awards ==
=== Bundesliga Rookie of the Month ===
Month	Player	Result	Ref.
September	(Germany) Maurice Krattenmacher	Won	
