= Nicolas Kristof =

Austrian footballer (born 1999)

Personal information
- Full name: Nicolas Kristof
- Date of birth: 20 December 1999 (age 26)
- Place of birth: Heidelberg, Germany
- Height: 1.87 m (6 ft 2 in)
- Position: Goalkeeper

Team information
- Current team: SV Elversberg
- Number: 20

Youth career
- FC Badenia St. Ilgen
- –2011: SV Sandhausen
- 2011–2015: TSG Hoffenheim
- 2015–2018: SV Sandhausen

Senior career*
Years	Team	Apps	(Gls)
2018–2019	SV Sandhausen II	33	(0)
2019–2021	Astoria Walldorf	62	(0)
2021–	SV Elversberg	159	(0)

International career
2015	Austria U16	3	(0)
- * Club domestic league appearances and goals as of 30 October 2026

Nicolas Kristof (born 20 December 1999) is a professional footballer who plays as a goalkeeper for Bundesliga club SV Elversberg. Born in Germany, he was a youth international for Austria.

== Early life ==
Kristof was born in Heidelberg, Germany in 1999. He began his youth career at FC Badenia St. Ilgen, a club based in Leimen, before moving to SV Sandhausen and eventually TSG Hoffenheim in 2011. He would move back to Sandhausen in 2015 and remained in their youth set-up for three more years.

== Club career ==
=== SV Sandhausen ===
Kristof had played for SV Sandhausen at youth level for several years in two different spells, and his senior career began for the side's reserve team in the Verbandsliga Nordbaden in 2018. His first appearance was in a 6–1 victory over SV 98 Schwetzingen. Kristof would make 33 appearances in the league that season.

=== Astoria Walldorf ===
The following season, Kristof moved to Regionalliga Südwest side FC Astoria Walldorf. Kristof would make his first of 23 appearances that season in the league in a 4–1 away victory against FC Rot-Weiß Koblenz. The following season he would make 43 appearances in all competitions, with Astoria reaching the final of the Baden Cup that season, losing 2–1 to SV Waldhof Mannheim.

=== SV Elversberg ===
Kristof would sign for SV Elversberg, playing 16 games in all competitions his first season there as the club finished first and were promoted to the 3. Liga. The following season, Kristof would sign a 3-year deal that kept him at the club until 2025, and he would become a regular in the side, keeping 11 clean sheets in 36 league games as the team secured back to back promotions, winning the 2022–23 3. Liga at the first attempt. Kristof would make 34 appearances in all competitions the following season, Elversberg's first ever in the second tier, as they finished 11th. The following season, Kristof would make 36 appearances in all competitions as Elversberg secured their highest ever league finish of 3rd in the 2. Bundesliga, eventually losing the promotion/relegation play-offs to 1. FC Heidenheim. Kristof extended his contract with SV Elversberg until 2029 on 1 July 2026.

== International career ==
Born in Germany, Kristof is of Austrian descent through grandparents from Carinthia. He was called up to the senior Austria national team for a set of 2026 FIFA World Cup qualification matches in November 2025, but did not make an appearance yet.

== Career statistics ==
=== Club ===
As of match played 30 October 2026

Appearances and goals by club, season and competition
Club	Season	League			Cup (Note: Includes Baden Cup, Saarland Cup, DFB-Pokal)		Other		Total	
Club	Season	Division	Apps	Goals	Apps	Goals	Apps	Goals	Apps	Goals
SV Sanhausen II	2018–19	Verbandsliga Baden	33	0	—		—		33	0
Astoria Walldorf	2019–20	Regionalliga Südwest	23	0	—		—		23	0
Astoria Walldorf	2020–21	Regionalliga Südwest	39	0	4	0	—		43	0
Astoria Walldorf	Total		62	0	4	0	—		66	0
SV Elversberg	2021–22	Regionalliga Südwest	14	0	2	0	—		16	0
SV Elversberg	2022–23	3. Liga	36	0	2	0	—		38	0
SV Elversberg	2023–24	2. Bundesliga	33	0	1	0	—		34	0
SV Elversberg	2024–25	2. Bundesliga	34	0	2	0	2 (Note: Appearances in Bundesliga promotion play-offs)	0	36	0
SV Elversberg	2025–26	2. Bundesliga	34	0	2	0	—		36	0
SV Elversberg	2026–27	Bundesliga	8	0	2	0	—		10	0
SV Elversberg	Total		159	0	11	0	2	0	172	0
Career total			254	0	15	0	2	0	271	0

== Honours ==
SV Elversberg

- 3. Liga: 2022–23
- Saarland Cup: 2021–22, 2022–23
