= Carlo Sickinger =

German footballer (born 1997)

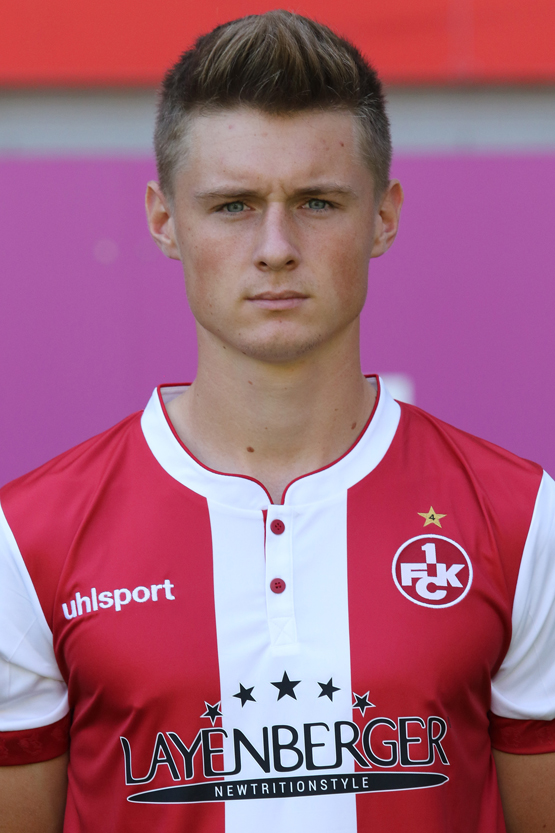
- Sickinger with 1. FC Kaiserslautern in 2018

Personal information
- Date of birth: 29 July 1997 (age 29)
- Place of birth: Karlsruhe, Germany
- Height: 1.83 m (6 ft 0 in)
- Position: Defender

Team information
- Current team: Darmstadt 98
- Number: 23

Youth career
- FC Spöck
- –2012: SV Sandhausen
- 2012–2016: 1. FC Kaiserslautern

Senior career*
Years	Team	Apps	(Gls)
2016–2018	1. FC Kaiserslautern II	63	(6)
2018–2021	1. FC Kaiserslautern	80	(3)
2021–2022	SV Sandhausen	6	(0)
2022	→ SV Elversberg (loan)	14	(1)
2022–2026	SV Elversberg	91	(7)
2026–	Darmstadt 98	0	(0)
- * Club domestic league appearances and goals as of 18 May 2026

Carlo Sickinger (born 29 July 1997) is a German professional footballer who plays as a midfielder for 2. Bundesliga club Darmstadt 98.

== Career ==
Sickinger made his professional debut for 1. FC Kaiserslautern in the 3. Liga on 8 December 2018, coming on as a substitute in the 75th minute for Theodor Bergmann in the 0–0 home draw against Würzburger Kickers.

On 26 January 2022, Sickinger joined SV Elversberg on loan. The transfer was made permanent at the end of the 2021–22 season and Sickinger signed a two-year contract with Elversberg.

On 20 July 2026, Sickinger moved to Darmstadt 98.

== Career statistics ==
As of match played 17 April 2026

Appearances and goals by club, season and competition
Club	Season	League			National cup		Other		Total	
Club	Season	Division	Apps	Goals	Apps	Goals	Apps	Goals	Apps	Goals
1. FC Kaiserslautern II	2016–17	Regionalliga Südwest	23	0	—		—		23	0
1. FC Kaiserslautern II	2017–18	Oberliga Rheinland-Pfalz/Saar	31	4	—		—		31	4
1. FC Kaiserslautern II	2018–19	Oberliga Rheinland-Pfalz/Saar	9	2	—		—		9	2
1. FC Kaiserslautern II	Total		63	6	—		—		63	6
1. FC Kaiserslautern	2018–19	3. Liga	19	2	0	0	5 (Note: Appearances in Southwestern Cup)	0	24	2
1. FC Kaiserslautern	2019–20	3. Liga	37	1	3	0	4	0	44	1
1. FC Kaiserslautern	2020–21	3. Liga	24	0	1	0	1	0	26	0
1. FC Kaiserslautern	Total		80	3	4	0	10	0	94	3
SV Sandhausen	2021–22	2. Bundesliga	6	0	1	0	—		7	0
SV Elversberg (loan)	2021–22	Regionalliga Südwest	14	1	—		2 (Note: Appearances in Saarland Cup)	1	16	2
SV Elversberg	2022–23	3. Liga	21	0	1	0	1	0	23	0
SV Elversberg	2023–24	2. Bundesliga	25	2	1	0	—		26	2
SV Elversberg	2024–25	2. Bundesliga	32	5	2	1	2 (Note: Appearances in Bundesliga promotion play-offs)	0	36	6
SV Elversberg	2025–26	2. Bundesliga	13	0	1	0	—		14	0
SV Elversberg	Total		91	7	5	0	3	0	99	7
Career total			254	17	10	1	15	1	279	19
