= Muhammed Damar =

German footballer (born 2004)

Personal information
- Full name: Muhammed Mehmet Damar
- Date of birth: 9 April 2004 (age 22)
- Place of birth: Berlin, Germany
- Height: 1.85 m (6 ft 1 in)
- Position: Midfielder

Team information
- Current team: VfL Wolfsburg
- Number: 20

Youth career
- 2009–2013: 1. FC Schöneberg
- 2013–2015: Hertha Zehlendorf
- 2012–2019: Hertha BSC
- 2019–2020: Hertha Zehlendorf
- 2020–2022: Eintracht Frankfurt

Senior career*
Years	Team	Apps	(Gls)
2022–2026	TSG Hoffenheim	21	(0)
2022–2026	TSG Hoffenheim II	20	(7)
2023–2024	→ Hannover 96 (loan)	4	(0)
2023–2024	→ Hannover 96 II (loan)	8	(9)
2024–2025	→ SV Elversberg (loan)	31	(9)
2026–	VfL Wolfsburg	6	(1)

International career^{‡}
2022	Germany U18	1	(0)
2022–2023	Germany U19	8	(6)
2023–2025	Germany U20	3	(1)
2025–	Germany U21	8	(4)
- * Club domestic league appearances and goals as of 18 September 2026 ‡ National team caps and goals as of 20:35, 17 November 2026 (UTC)

Muhammed Mehmet Damar (born 9 April 2004) is a German professional footballer who plays as a midfielder for 2. Bundesliga club VfL Wolfsburg.

== Professional career ==
Damar is a youth product of the academies of 1. FC Schöneberg, Hertha Zehlendorf, Hertha BSC, and Eintracht Frankfurt. On 7 July 2022, he transferred to 1899 Hoffenheim. He made his professional debut with Hoffenheim in a 3–1 Bundesliga loss to Borussia Mönchengladbach on 6 August 2022.

On 28 August 2023, Damar joined Hannover 96 on a season-long loan.

On 20 August 2024, Damar moved to SV Elversberg in 2. Bundesliga on loan.

On 23 July 2026, Damar signed a five-year contract with VfL Wolfsburg.

== International career ==
Born in Germany, Damar is of Turkish descent. He is a youth international for Germany, having played for the Germany U18s in 2022.

== Career statistics ==
As of match played 18 September 2026

Appearances and goals by club, season and competition
Club	Season	League			Cup		Europe		Other		Total	
Club	Season	Division	Apps	Goals	Apps	Goals	Apps	Goals	Apps	Goals	Apps	Goals
TSG Hoffenheim	2022–23	Bundesliga	6	0	—		—		—		6	0
TSG Hoffenheim	2025–26	Bundesliga	15	0	1	0	—		—		16	0
TSG Hoffenheim	Total		21	0	1	0	—		—		22	0
TSG Hoffenheim II	2022–23	Regionalliga Südwest	20	7	—		—		—		20	7
Hannover 96 (loan)	2023–24	2. Bundesliga	4	0	0	0	—		—		4	0
Hannover 96 II (loan)	2023–24	Regionalliga Nord	8	9	—		—		—		8	9
SV Elversberg (loan)	2024–25	2. Bundesliga	31	9	1	0	—		2 (Note: Appearances in Bundesliga play-offs)	0	34	9
VfL Wolfsburg	2026–27	2. Bundesliga	6	1	1	0	—		—		7	1
Career total			90	26	3	0	0	0	2	0	95	26
