= Lukas Pinckert =

German footballer (born 2000)

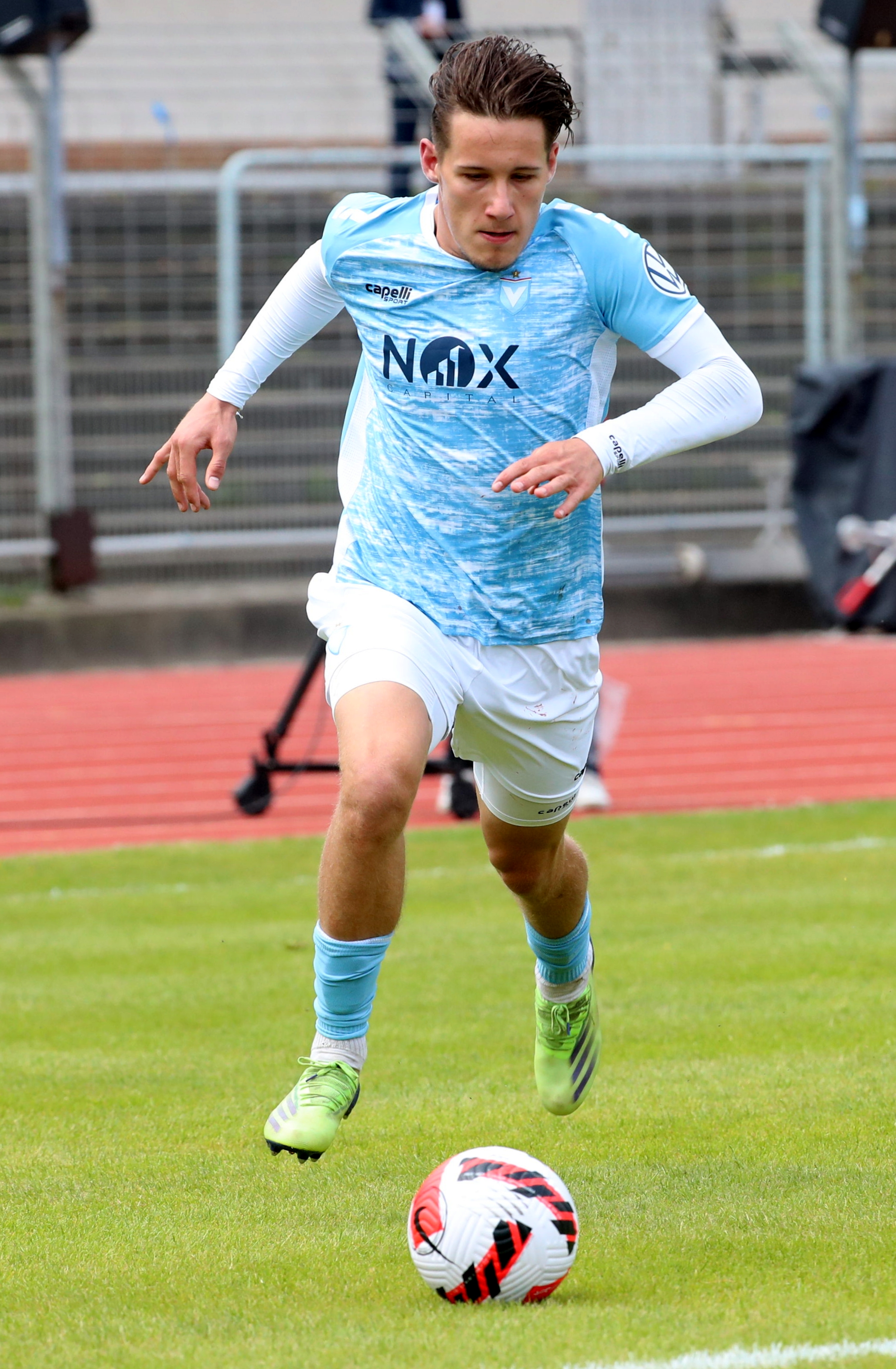
- Pinckert with Viktoria Berlin in 2022

Personal information
- Full name: Lukas Finn Pinckert
- Date of birth: 22 January 2000 (age 26)
- Place of birth: Bad Bramstedt, Germany
- Position: Right-back

Team information
- Current team: SV Elversberg
- Number: 19

Youth career
- 2005–2011: TSV Weddelbrook
- 2011–2019: Hamburger SV

Senior career*
Years	Team	Apps	(Gls)
2019–2021	Hamburger SV II	26	(0)
2021–2022	Viktoria Berlin	35	(2)
2022–	SV Elversberg	116	(1)
- * Club domestic league appearances and goals as of 30 October 2026

Lukas Finn Pinckert (born 22 January 2000) is a German professional footballer who plays as a right-back for Bundesliga club SV Elversberg.

== Career statistics ==
As of match played 30 October 2026

Appearances and goals by club, season and competition
Club	Season	League			DFB-Pokal		Europe		Other		Total	
Club	Season	Division	Apps	Goals	Apps	Goals	Apps	Goals	Apps	Goals	Apps	Goals
Hamburger SV II	2019–20	Regionalliga Nord	21	0	—		—		—		21	0
Hamburger SV II	2020–21	Regionalliga Nord	5	0	—		—		—		5	0
Hamburger SV II	Total		26	0	—		—		—		26	0
Viktoria Berlin	2021–22	3. Liga	35	2	—		—		—		35	2
SV Elversberg	2022–23	3. Liga	26	1	2	0	—		—		28	1
SV Elversberg	2023–24	2. Bundesliga	20	0	1	0	—		—		21	0
SV Elversberg	2024–25	2. Bundesliga	33	0	2	0	—		1	0	36	0
SV Elversberg	2025–26	2. Bundesliga	29	0	2	0	—		—		31	0
SV Elversberg	2026–27	Bundesliga	8	0	1	0	—		—		9	0
SV Elversberg	Total		116	1	8	0	—		1	0	125	1
Career total			148	3	6	0	0	0	1	0	155	3
