= Florian Le Joncour =

French footballer (born 1995)

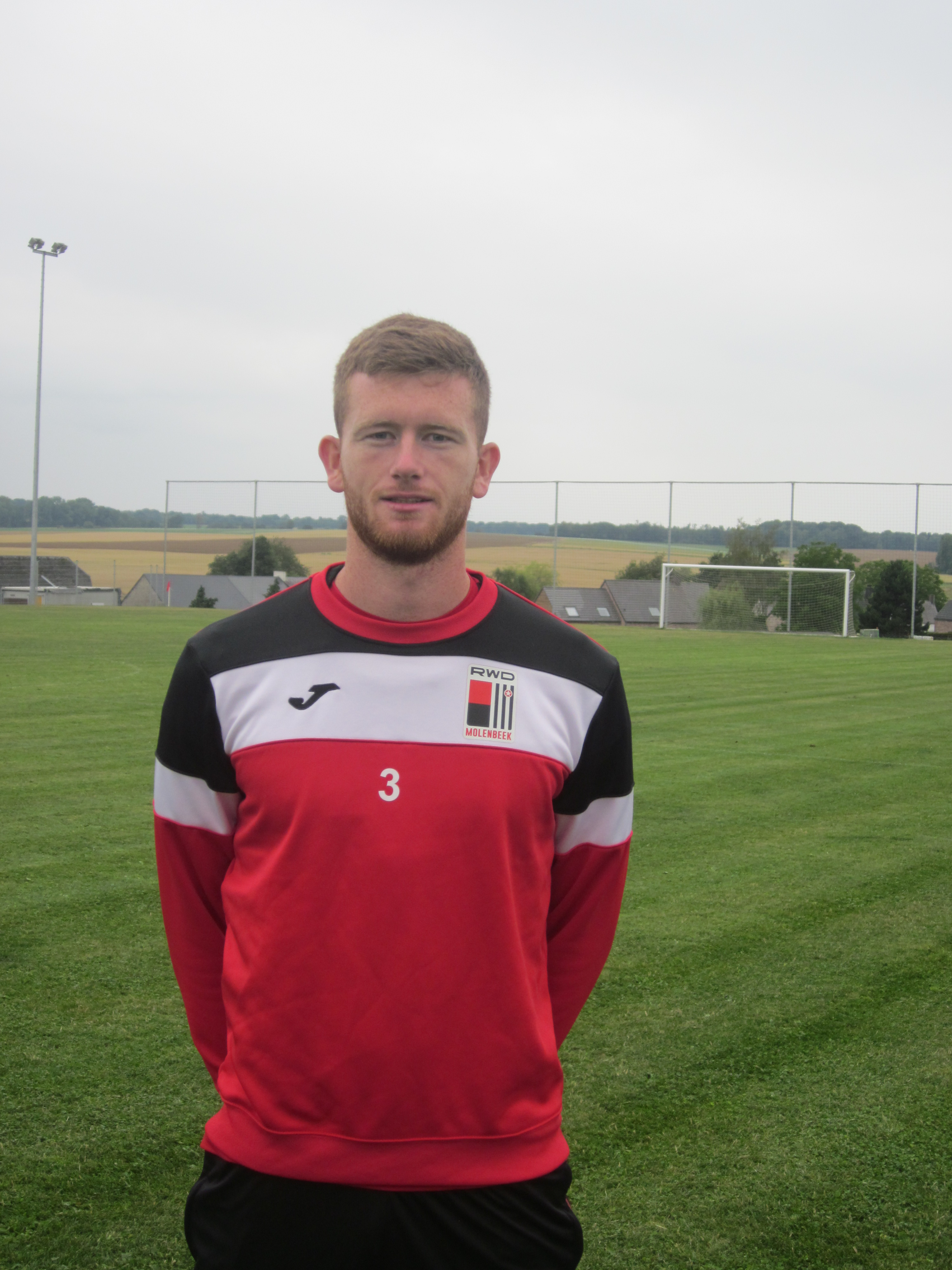
- Le Joncour with RWDM in 2020.

Personal information
- Date of birth: 3 February 1995 (age 31)
- Place of birth: Quimper, France
- Height: 1.92 m (6 ft 4 in)
- Position: Centre-back

Team information
- Current team: SV Elversberg
- Number: 3

Youth career
- –2013: Guingamp

Senior career*
Years	Team	Apps	(Gls)
2013–2015	US Concarneau	28	(2)
2015–2018	Caen	15	(1)
2016–2017	→ Avranches (loan)	24	(1)
2018–2020	US Concarneau	49	(2)
2020–2024	RWDM	93	(8)
2024–	SV Elversberg	49	(3)
- * Club domestic league appearances and goals as of 29 August 2026

Florian Yves Le Joncour (born 3 February 1995) is a French professional footballer who plays as a centre-back for Bundesliga club SV Elversberg.

== Career ==
Le Joncour started his career with French fourth division side US Concarneau.

In 2015, he signed for Caen in Ligue 1.

In 2016, he was sent on loan to French third division club Avranches.

In 2018, he returned to US Concarneau in the French third division.

In 2020, Le Joncour signed for Belgian outfit RWDM after receiving offers from Portugal and the French third division. On 22 August 2020, he debuted for RWDM during a 2–0 win over Club NXT. On 25 April 2021, he scored his first goal for RWDM during a 3–0 win over Lierse K.

On 1 February 2024, Le Joncour moved to 2. Bundesliga club SV Elversberg, having agreed a contract until summer 2025.

== Career statistics ==
As of 27 October 2026

Appearances and goals by club, season and competition
Club	Season	League			National cup (Note: Includes Coupe de France, Belgian Cup, DFB-Pokal)		Other		Total	
Club	Season	Division	Apps	Goals	Apps	Goals	Apps	Goals	Apps	Goals
US Concarneau	2013–14	CFA	0	0	0	0	—		0	0
US Concarneau	2014–15	CFA	28	2	5	0	—		33	2
US Concarneau	Total		28	2	5	0	—		33	2
Caen II	2015–16	CFA 2	18	0	—		—		18	0
Caen II	2017–18	CFA 2	18	1	—		—		18	1
Caen II	Total		36	1	—		—		36	1
Caen	2015–16	Ligue 1	0	0	0	0	0	0	0	0
Caen	2017–18	Ligue 1	0	0	0	0	0	0	0	0
Caen	Total		0	0	0	0	0	0	0	0
Avranches (loan)	2016–17	Ligue 3	24	1	4	0	—		28	1
Avranches II (loan)	2016–17	CFA 1	4	0	—		—		4	0
US Concarneau	2018–19	Ligue 3	30	1	3	0	—		33	1
US Concarneau	2019–20	Ligue 3	19	1	1	0	—		20	1
US Concarneau	Total		49	2	4	0	—		53	2
RWDM	2020–21	Challenger Pro League	27	1	1	0	—		28	1
RWDM	2021–22	Challenger Pro League	25	4	2	0	2 (Note: Appearance(s) in Belgian Pro League promotion/relegation play-offs)	0	29	4
RWDM	2022–23	Challenger Pro League	30	3	2	0	—		32	3
RWDM	2023–24	Belgian Pro League	11	0	2	0	0	0	13	0
RWDM	Total		93	8	7	0	2	0	102	8
SV Elversberg	2023–24	2. Bundesliga	14	1	0	0	—		14	1
SV Elversberg	2024–25	2. Bundesliga	17	1	1	0	—		18	1
SV Elversberg	2025–26	2. Bundesliga	18	1	2	0	—		20	1
SV Elversberg	2026–27	Bundesliga	1	0	2	0	—		3	0
SV Elversberg	Total		50	3	5	0	—		55	3
Career total			284	18	23	0	2	0	311	16
