= Frank Lehmann =

German footballer (born 1989)

Personal information
- Date of birth: 29 April 1989 (age 37)
- Place of birth: Balingen, West Germany
- Height: 1.93 m (6 ft 4 in)
- Position: Goalkeeper

Team information
- Current team: SV Elversberg
- Number: 1

Youth career
- TG Schömberg
- SV Zimmern
- –2002: FC 07 Albstadt
- 2002–2007: VfB Stuttgart

Senior career*
Years	Team	Apps	(Gls)
2007–2010	VfB Stuttgart II	1	(0)
2008–2009	→ Eintracht Frankfurt II (loan)	15	(0)
2009–2010	→ Energie Cottbus II (loan)	14	(0)
2009–2010	→ Energie Cottbus (loan)	1	(0)
2010–2013	1. FC Heidenheim	83	(0)
2013–2017	VfL Osnabrück	19	(0)
2014–2017	VfL Osnabrück II	7	(0)
2017–2026	SV Elversberg II	32	(0)
2017–	SV Elversberg	153	(0)

International career
2006	Germany U18	2	(0)
- * Club domestic league appearances and goals as of 2 May 2026

Frank Lehmann (born 29 April 1989) is a German professional footballer who plays as a goalkeeper for Bundesliga club SV Elversberg.

== Club career ==
Lehmann began his career with VfB Stuttgart, and made one appearance for the reserve team, on the last day of the 2007–08 season. He spent the next two seasons on loan with Eintracht Frankfurt and then Energie Cottbus, where he again played reserve team football, but he did make one appearance for the Cottbus first team in the 2. Bundesliga, as a substitute for Gerhard Tremmel on the last day of the 2009–10 season, in a 4–1 win over Rot-Weiss Ahlen.

In 2010, Lehmann signed for 1. FC Heidenheim of the 3. Liga. In his first season, he served as backup to Erol Sabanov, and made five appearances, but took over as first choice the following season. He lost his place to Sabanov again after 11 games of the 2012–13 season, and left the club in January 2013. After half a season without a club, he signed a one-year contract with VfL Osnabrück on 2 September 2013, which was later extended until 2016.

After four years with Osnabrück, Lehmann moved to Regionalliga Südwest club SV Elversberg on 2 August 2017.

== International career ==
Lehmann gained two caps for the Germany U18 team, coming on for Mohamed Amsif in the first of two friendlies against Turkey U18 on 14 November 2006, and starting in the second tie on 16 November.

== Career statistics ==
As of match played 18 April 2026

Appearances and goals by club, season and competition
Club	Season	League			DFB-Pokal		Other		Total	
Club	Season	Division	Apps	Goals	Apps	Goals	Apps	Goals	Apps	Goals
VfB Stuttgart II	2007–08	Regionalliga Südwest	1	0	—		—		1	0
Eintracht Frankfurt II (loan)	2008–09	Regionalliga Südwest	15	0	—		—		15	0
Energie Cottbus II (loan)	2009–10	NOFV-Oberliga Nord	14	0	—		—		14	0
Energie Cottbus (loan)	2009–10	2. Bundesliga	1	0	—		—		1	0
1. FC Heidenheim	2010–11	3. Liga	5	0	—		1 (Note: Appearance in Württemberg Cup)	0	6	0
1. FC Heidenheim	2011–12	3. Liga	37	0	2	0	0	0	39	0
1. FC Heidenheim	2012–13	3. Liga	11	0	1	0	0	0	12	0
1. FC Heidenheim	Total		83	0	3	0	1	0	87	0
VfL Osnabrück	2013–14	3. Liga	5	0	0	0	—		5	0
VfL Osnabrück	2014–15	3. Liga	13	0	0	0	2 (Note: Appearances in Lower Saxony Cup)	0	15	0
VfL Osnabrück	2015–16	3. Liga	0	0	0	0	0	0	0	0
VfL Osnabrück	2016–17	3. Liga	1	0	0	0	3	0	4	0
VfL Osnabrück	Total		19	0	0	0	5	0	24	0
VfL Osnabrück II	2014–15	Oberliga Niedersachsen	3	0	—		—		3	0
VfL Osnabrück II	2015–16	Oberliga Niedersachsen	1	0	—		—		1	0
VfL Osnabrück II	2016–17	Oberliga Niedersachsen	3	0	—		—		3	0
VfL Osnabrück II	Total		7	0	—		—		7	0
SV Elversberg II	2017–18	Saarlandliga	0	0	—		—		0	0
SV Elversberg II	2018–19	Saarlandliga	2	0	—		—		2	0
SV Elversberg II	2024–25	Saarlandliga	13	0	—		—		13	0
SV Elversberg II	2025–26	Saarlandliga	17	0	—		—		17	0
SV Elversberg II	Total		32	0	—		—		32	0
SV Elversberg	2017–18	Regionalliga Südwest	35	0	—		3 (Note: Appearance(s) in Saarland Cup)	0	38	0
SV Elversberg	2018–19	Regionalliga Südwest	30	0	1	0	2	0	33	0
SV Elversberg	2019–20	Regionalliga Südwest	23	0	0	0	3	0	26	0
SV Elversberg	2020–21	Regionalliga Südwest	39	0	2	0	1	0	42	0
SV Elversberg	2021–22	Regionalliga Südwest	22	0	1	0	1	0	24	0
SV Elversberg	2022–23	3. Liga	2	0	0	0	4	0	6	0
SV Elversberg	2022–23	2. Bundesliga	0	0	0	0	—		0	0
SV Elversberg	2024–25	2. Bundesliga	0	0	0	0	0	0	0	0
SV Elversberg	2025–26	2. Bundesliga	0	0	0	0	—		0	0
SV Elversberg	Total		151	0	4	0	14	0	169	0
Career total			293	0	7	0	20	0	320	0
