= 2022–23 SV Elversberg season =

SV Elversberg
2022–23 season
- Stadium: Waldstadion an der Kaiserlinde
- 3. Liga: TBD
- DFB-Pokal: First round
- Saarland Cup: TBD
- Top goalscorer: League: TBD; All: TBD
- Highest home attendance: TBD

The 2022–23 SV Elversberg season was the club's first season return in the 3. Liga since 2013–14.

In addition to the 3. Liga, SV Elversberg also competed in the DFB-Pokal and the Saarland Cup.

== Competitions ==
=== Friendlies ===
25 June 2022	SV Elversberg	2–1	Borussia Mönchengladbach II	Friedrichsthal
		Report		Stadium: Sportanlage Am Franzschacht

28 June 2022	SV Darmstadt 98	1–1	SV Elversberg	Darmstadt
	Mehlem 59'	Report	81' Schnellbacher	Stadium: Böllenfalltor Training Ground 4

2 July 2022	SC Freiburg	0–0	SV Elversberg	Freiburg
14:00 CEST (UTC+2)		Report		Stadium: Dreisamstadion; Attendance: 4,800

9 July 2022	SV Waldhof Mannheim	0–1	SV Elversberg	Mannheim
		Report	Koffi	Stadium: Seppl-Herberger-Stadion

=== 3. Liga ===
==== Table ====
Pos	Team	Pld	W	D	L	GF	GA	GD	Pts	Promotion, qualification or relegation
1	SV Elversberg (C, P)	38	22	8	8	80	40	+40	74	Promotion to 2. Bundesliga and qualification for DFB-Pokal
2	SC Freiburg II (Note: Reserve teams are ineligible for promotion or DFB-Pokal qualification.)	38	21	10	7	54	34	+20	73	
3	VfL Osnabrück (P)	38	21	7	10	70	49	+21	70	Promotion to 2. Bundesliga and qualification for DFB-Pokal
4	Wehen Wiesbaden (O, P)	38	21	7	10	71	51	+20	70	Qualification for promotion play-offs and DFB-Pokal
5	1. FC Saarbrücken	38	20	9	9	64	39	+25	69	Qualification for DFB-Pokal

Source: DFB
Rules for classification: 1) Points; 2) Goal difference; 3) Goals scored; 4) Head-to-head results; 5) Head-to-head away goals scored; 6) Away goals scored; 7) Play-off.
(C) Champions; (O) Play-off winners; (P) Promoted

==== Results summary ====
Overall								Home						Away					
Pld	W	D	L	GF	GA	GD	Pts	W	D	L	GF	GA	GD	W	D	L	GF	GA	GD
38	22	8	8	80	40	+40	74	12	4	3	47	20	+27	10	4	5	33	20	+13

Last updated: 27 May 2023.
Source: Soccerway

Round	1	2	3	4	5	6	7	8	9	10	11	12	13	14	15	16	17	18	19	20	21	22	23	24	25	26	27	28	29	30	31	32	33	34	35	36	37	38
Ground	A	H	A	H	A	H	A	H	A	H	H	A	H	A	H	A	H	A	H	H	A	H	A	H	A	H	A	H	A	A	H	A	H	A	H	A	H	A
Result	W	L	W	W	W	W	D	W	W	L	W	W	W	D	W	W	W	L	W	W	W	W	W	D	L	D	D	D	W	D	W	L	L	L	W	L	D	W
Position	1	8	6	4	2	2	2	1	1	2	1	1	1	1	1	1	1	1	1	1	1	1	1	1	1	1	1	1	1	1	1	1	1	1	1	1	1	1

Updated to match(es) played on 27 May 2023. Source:
A = Away; H = Home; W = Win; D = Draw; L = Loss

=== DFB-Pokal ===
30 July 2022 First Round	Elversberg	4–3	Bayer Leverkusen	Spiesen-Elversberg
15:30 CEST	Rochelt 2'; Koffi 17' (pen.); Schnellbacher 37'; Conrad 74'; Mustafa (yellow card) 90+5'	Report	Hložek 5'; Aránguiz 30'; Bakker (yellow card) 45+5'; Diaby (yellow card) 64'; Schick 89'; Demirbay (yellow card) 90+5'	Stadium: Waldstadion an der Kaiserlinde; Attendance: 7,500; Referee: (Germany) Martin Petersen

18 October 2022 Second Round	Elversberg	0–1	VfL Bochum	Spiesen-Elversberg
20:45 CEST	Rochelt (yellow card) 54'; Sinan Tekerci (yellow card) 84'; Jaconsen (yellow card) 87'	Report	Antwi-Adjei (yellow card) 29'; Gamboa (yellow card) 43'; Losilla 85'	Stadium: Waldstadion an der Kaiserlinde; Attendance: 6,911; Referee: (Germany) Sven Waschitzki-Günther

=== Saarland Cup ===
11 October 2022 Round of 32	Besseringen	0–12	Elversberg	Merzig
19:00 CET		Report		Stadium: Merzig Kunstrasen

2 November 2022 Round of 16	Marpingen-Urexweiler	0–6	Elversberg	Marpingen
19:00 CET		Report		Stadium: Fußballplatz Hellas Marpingen

28 March 2023 Quarter Finals	Diefflen	0–1	Elversberg	Dillingen
19:00 CET		Report		Stadium: Stadion am Babelsberg

2 May 2023 Semi Finals	Auersmacher	1–3	Elversberg	Auersmacher
19:00 CET		Report		Stadium: Saar-Blies-Stadion

3 June 2023 Final	Saarbrücken	2–3 (a.e.t.)	Elversberg	Saarbrücken
16:15 CET		Report		Stadium: Ludwigsparkstadion
