= Robin Fellhauer =

German footballer (born 1998)

Personal information
- Full name: Robin Salvatore Fellhauer
- Date of birth: 21 January 1998 (age 28)
- Place of birth: Mannheim, Germany
- Height: 1.85 m (6 ft 1 in)
- Positions: Defensive midfielder; right-back

Team information
- Current team: FC Augsburg
- Number: 19

Youth career
- 2012–2014: 1. FC Saarbrücken
- 2014–2017: SC Freiburg

Senior career*
Years	Team	Apps	(Gls)
2016–2019	SC Freiburg II	40	(0)
2019–2025	SV Elversberg	161	(14)
2025–	FC Augsburg	42	(6)

International career
	Germany U15	2	(0)
2013–2014	Germany U16	4	(0)
2016	Germany U18	2	(0)
- * Club domestic league appearances and goals as of 31 October 2026

Robin Salvatore Fellhauer (born 21 January 1998) is a German professional footballer who plays as a defensive midfielder or right-back for Bundesliga side FC Augsburg.

== Club career ==
At the age of 16 Fellhauer left 1. FC Saarbrücken to join the youth academy of Bundesliga club SC Freiburg, along with his twin sister Kim.

Fellhauer returned to the Saarland in 2019, signing with Regionalliga Südwest side SV Elversberg in 2019. Having made just six appearances in his first season with the club, he established himself as a starter in the 2020–21 season. At the end of 2022-23 season, Fellhauer promoted to the 2. Bundesliga with Elversberg for the first time in club history.

On 28 June 2025, Fellhauer signed a four-year contract with Bundesliga club FC Augsburg. On 10 October 2026, he scored the fastest goal in Bundesliga history, doing so after an error by Bayern Munich goalkeeper Manuel Neuer eight seconds into a 2–2 draw with the defending champion.

== International career ==
Fellhauer represented Germany at youth levels U15 until U18, making eight appearances.

== Style of play ==
A right-back, Fellhauer has occasionally been deployed at centre-back. He is noted for his speed and resolute tackling.

== Personal life ==
Fellhauer's father Andreas is a former professional footballer who played for 1. FC Saarbrücken and Waldhof Mannheim. Robin's sister Kim has played professionally for SC Freiburg. He has three younger brothers.

== Career statistics ==
As of match played 31 October 2026

Appearances and goals by club, season and competition
Club	Season	League			Cup		Other		Total	
Club	Season	Division	Apps	Goals	Apps	Goals	Apps	Goals	Apps	Goals
SC Freiburg II	2017–18	Regionalliga Südwest	12	0	—		—		12	0
SC Freiburg II	2018–19	Regionalliga Südwest	25	0	—		—		25	0
SC Freiburg II	2019–20	Regionalliga Südwest	3	0	—		—		3	0
SC Freiburg II	Total		40	0	—		—		40	0
SV Elversberg	2019–20	Regionalliga Südwest	6	0	—		6 (Note: Appearances in Saarland Cup)	0	12	0
SV Elversberg	2020–21	Regionalliga Südwest	38	3	1	1	1	0	40	4
SV Elversberg	2021–22	Regionalliga Südwest	31	2	1	0	—		32	2
SV Elversberg	2022–23	3. Liga	32	4	2	0	0	0	34	4
SV Elversberg	2023–24	2. Bundesliga	29	0	0	0	—		29	0
SV Elversberg	2024–25	2. Bundesliga	25	5	1	1	2 (Note: Appearances in promotion play-offs)	1	28	7
SV Elversberg	Total		161	14	5	2	9	1	175	17
Augsburg	2025–26	Bundesliga	34	3	2	0	—		36	3
Augsburg	2026–27	Bundesliga	8	3	2	0	—		10	2
Augsburg	Total		42	6	4	0	—		46	5
Career total			243	20	9	2	9	1	261	22
