= Tom Zimmerschied =

German footballer (born 1998)

Personal information
- Date of birth: 22 September 1998 (age 28)
- Place of birth: Koblenz, Germany
- Height: 1.80 m (5 ft 11 in)
- Position: Left winger

Team information
- Current team: SV Elversberg
- Number: 29

Youth career
- Bayern Munich
- 2015–2017: SpVgg Unterhaching

Senior career*
| Years | Team | Apps | (Gls) |
| 2017–2020 | VfR Garching | 65 | (6) |
| 2020–2021 | Dornbirn 1913 | 28 | (7) |
| 2021–2023 | Hallescher FC | 47 | (12) |
| 2023–2024 | Dynamo Dresden | 37 | (5) |
| 2024– | SV Elversberg | 59 | (8) |
- * Club domestic league appearances and goals as of 10 October 2026

Tom Zimmerschied (born 22 September 1998) is a German professional footballer who plays as a left winger for Bundesliga club SV Elversberg.

== Career ==
A former youth academy player of Bayern Munich and SpVgg Unterhaching, Zimmerschied joined VfR Garching ahead of 2017–18 Regionalliga season. On 10 August 2020, Austrian second division club Dornbirn 1913 announced the signing of Zimmerschied. He made his professional debut for the club on 12 September 2020 in 1–0 league win against Grazer AK.

In June 2021, Zimmerschied returned to Germany by signing for Hallescher FC.

On 6 June 2023, Zimmerschied signed a two-year contract with Dynamo Dresden.

On 21 August 2024, Zimmerschied moved to SV Elversberg in 2. Bundesliga on a three-season contract.

== Career statistics ==
As of match played 10 October 2026

Appearances and goals by club, season and competition
| Club | Season | League | | | National cup (Note: Includes Austrian Cup, DFB-Pokal) | | Other | | Total | |
| Club | Season | Division | Apps | Goals | Apps | Goals | Apps | Goals | Apps | Goals |
|---|---|---|---|---|---|---|---|---|---|---|
| VfR Garching | 2017–18 | Regionalliga Bayern | 16 | 2 | 0 | 0 | — | | 16 | 2 |
| VfR Garching | 2018–19 | Regionalliga Bayern | 31 | 3 | 0 | 0 | 1 (Note: Appearance(s) in Bavarian Cup) | 0 | 32 | 3 |
| VfR Garching | 2019–20 | Regionalliga Bayern | 0 | 0 | 0 | 0 | 3 | 0 | 3 | 0 |
| VfR Garching | 2020–21 | Regionalliga Bayern | 18 | 1 | 0 | 0 | — | | 18 | 1 |
| VfR Garching | Total | | 65 | 6 | 0 | 0 | 4 | 0 | 69 | 6 |
| FC Dornbirn | 2020–21 | Austrian 2. Liga | 28 | 7 | 1 | 0 | — | | 28 | 7 |
| Hallescher FC | 2021–22 | 3. Liga | 13 | 2 | 0 | 0 | — | | 13 | 2 |
| Hallescher FC | 2022–23 | 3. Liga | 34 | 10 | 0 | 0 | 3 (Note: Appearances in Saxony-Anhalt Cup) | 2 | 37 | 12 |
| Hallescher FC | Total | | 47 | 12 | 0 | 0 | 3 | 2 | 50 | 14 |
| Dynamo Dresden | 2023–24 | 3. Liga | 37 | 5 | 0 | 0 | 3 (Note: Appearances in Saxony Cup) | 0 | 40 | 5 |
| SV Elversberg | 2024–25 | 2. Bundesliga | 24 | 4 | 1 | 0 | 2 (Note: Appearances in Bundesliga promotion play-offs) | 0 | 27 | 4 |
| SV Elversberg | 2025–26 | 2. Bundesliga | 34 | 4 | 2 | 0 | — | | 36 | 4 |
| SV Elversberg | 2026–27 | Bundesliga | 1 | 0 | 0 | 0 | — | | 1 | 0 |
| SV Elversberg | Total | | 59 | 8 | 3 | 0 | 2 | 0 | 64 | 8 |
| Career total | | | 236 | 38 | 3 | 0 | 12 | 2 | 251 | 40 |

== Honours ==
Hallescher FC

- Saxony-Anhalt Cup: 2022–23

Dynamo Dresden

- Saxony Cup: 2023–24
