= Cole Campbell =

American soccer player (born 2006)

Personal information
- Full name: William Cole Campbell
- Date of birth: February 20, 2006 (age 20)
- Place of birth: Houston, Texas, U.S.
- Height: 1.70 m (5 ft 7 in)
- Position: Winger

Team information
- Current team: SV Elversberg
- Number: 39

Youth career
- –2020: Atlanta United
- 2020–2022: FH
- 2022–2024: Borussia Dortmund

Senior career*
Years	Team	Apps	(Gls)
2021–2022	FH	2	(0)
2022	Breiðablik	1	(0)
2024–2026	Borussia Dortmund II	13	(2)
2024–2026	Borussia Dortmund	5	(0)
2025–2026	→ TSG Hoffenheim (loan)	5	(0)
2026–	SV Elversberg	7	(2)

International career^{‡}
2021	Iceland U17	7	(2)
2024	United States U19	2	(2)
2024–2026	United States U20	8	(3)
2025–	United States U23	3	(1)
2026–	United States	1	(0)
- * Club domestic league appearances and goals as of October 30, 2026 ‡ National team caps and goals as of 02:10, October 7, 2026 (UTC)

William Cole Campbell (born February 20, 2006) is an American professional soccer player who plays as a winger for Bundesliga club SV Elversberg and the United States national team. He has represented both the United States and Iceland at youth level.

== Early life ==
Campbell was born in Houston to American-born Iceland international and University of North Carolina soccer player Rakel Karvelsson and pharmaceutical executive Lance Campbell, himself a soccer player at Texas Lutheran University. In 2015, his family moved to Peachtree City, Georgia, where his father drove more than an hour each way so he could train with Atlanta United FC's youth academy. Campbell regularly visited Iceland during the summers and trained with the professional side Fimleikafélag Hafnarfjarðar (FH) starting at age 8.

== Club career ==
In January 2020, Campbell moved to Iceland, joining the Fimleikafélag Hafnarfjarðar youth team. He made his first-team debut in 2021, coming on as a substitute for Jónatan Ingi Jónsson in a 5–0 win over Leiknir Reykjavík, becoming the second youngest player in FH history after Logi Hrafn Róbertsson.

On May 16, 2022, following another appearance for FH, it was announced that Campbell would join the German side Borussia Dortmund that summer. The following day, he joined Breiðablik on a short-term deal, effective until his move to Dortmund in July. He left Iceland in June 2022, following one appearance with Breiðablik.

In January 2024, Campbell was one of several Dortmund youth players who joined the senior team's winter training camp before the second half of the 2023–24 season in Marbella, south Spain. At the camp however, the club disciplined Campbell and Paris Brunner for leaving the team hotel after their midnight curfew.

On October 26, 2024, Campbell made his professional debut for Borussia Dortmund, coming on as a substitute for Donyell Malen in a 2–1 loss to FC Augsburg.

On January 5, 2026, Campbell was loaned by TSG Hoffenheim in the Bundesliga until the end of the 2025–26 season, with an option to buy.

On July 9, 2026, Campbell signed a four-year contract with Bundesliga newcomers SV Elversberg.

== International career ==
Eligible at birth to represent both Iceland and the United States, FIFA approved Campbell's one-time switch of nationalities to play for the United States after previously playing for Iceland's under-17 team.

In March 2024, he accepted a call up to the United States under-19 team, for which he debuted on March 24 against England under-19, marking his debut with a match-winning brace in a 3–2 win for the United States.

Campbell was one of the 28 players were called up with the United States national team by head coach Mauricio Pochettino for friendly matches against Peru, Chile, Mexico, and Canada on September 26 and 29 and October 3 and 6, 2026 respectively.

== Career statistics ==
=== Club ===
As of match played October 30, 2026

Appearances and goals by club, season and competition
Club	Season	League			National cup (Note: Includes Icelandic Men's Football Cup, DFB-Pokal)		Continental		Other		Total	
Club	Season	Division	Apps	Goals	Apps	Goals	Apps	Goals	Apps	Goals	Apps	Goals
FH	2021	Úrvalsdeild	1	0	0	0	—		0	0	1	0
FH	2022	Besta deild karla	1	0	0	0	—		0	0	1	0
FH	Total		2	0	0	0	—		0	0	2	0
Breiðablik	2022	Besta deild karla	1	0	0	0	—		0	0	1	0
Borussia Dortmund II	2024–25	3. Liga	11	2	—		—		—		11	2
Borussia Dortmund	2024–25	Bundesliga	4	0	1	0	1 (Note: Appearance in UEFA Champions League)	0	0	0	6	0
Borussia Dortmund	2025–26	Bundesliga	1	0	0	0	0	0	—		1	0
Borussia Dortmund	Total		5	0	1	0	1	0	0	0	7	0
1899 Hoffenheim (loan)	2025–26	Bundesliga	5	0	—		—		—		5	0
SV Elversberg	2026–27	Bundesliga	7	2	2	0	—		—		9	2
Career total			31	4	3	0	1	0	0	0	35	4

=== International ===
As of match played October 6, 2026

Appearances and goals by national team and year
National team	Year	Apps	Goals
United States	2026	1	0
Total		1	0
