= Lukas Petkov =

German-Bulgarian footballer (born 2000)

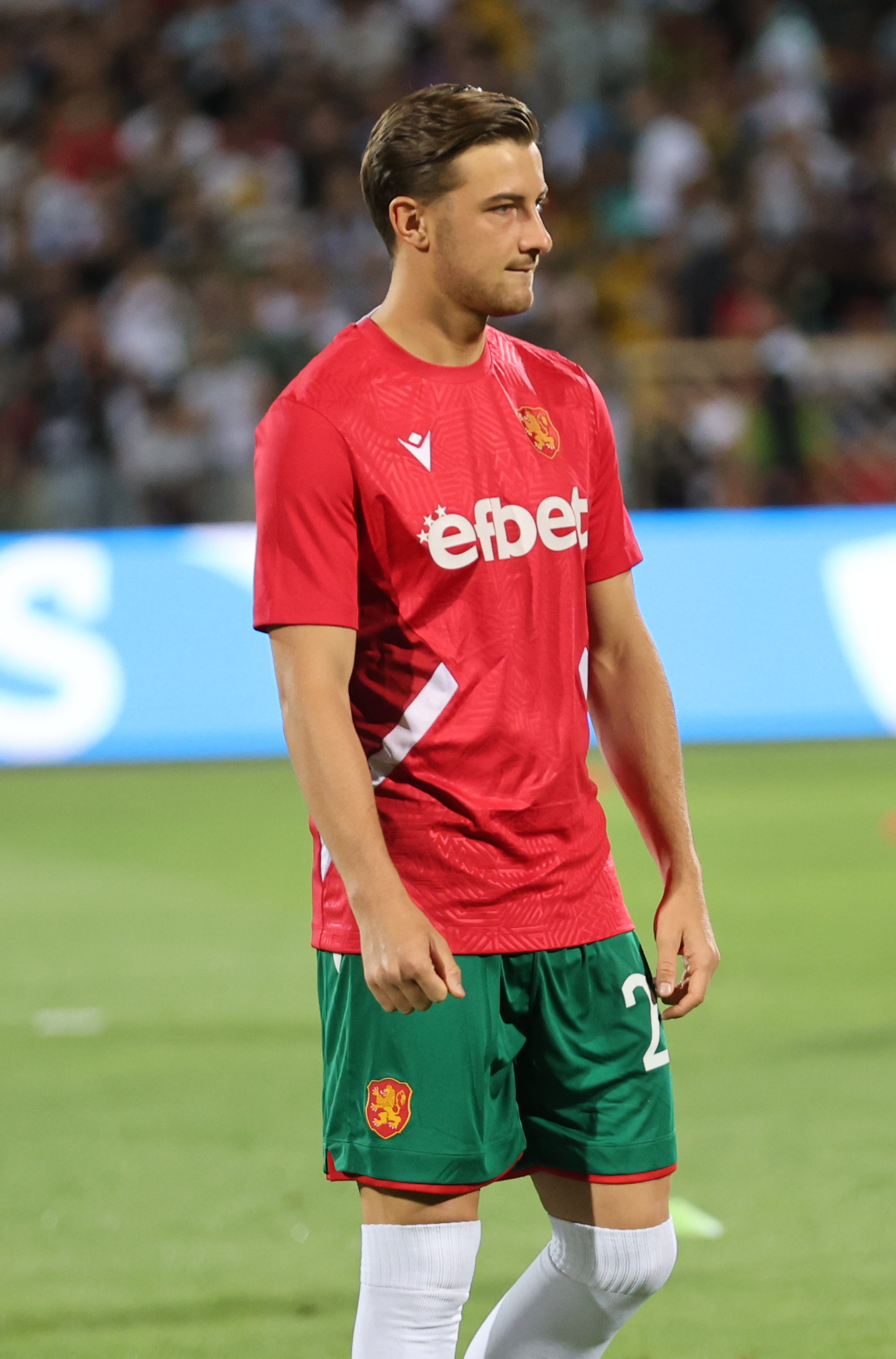
- Petkov with Bulgaria in 2025

Personal information
- Full name: Lukas Emanuel Petkov
- Date of birth: 1 November 2000 (age 26)
- Place of birth: Friedberg, Germany
- Height: 1.83 m (6 ft 0 in)
- Position: Forward

Team information
- Current team: SV Elversberg
- Number: 25

Youth career
- 2007–2008: SV Mering
- 2008–2018: FC Augsburg

Senior career*
Years	Team	Apps	(Gls)
2018–2022	FC Augsburg II	29	(6)
2021–2024	FC Augsburg	8	(0)
2021–2022	→ SC Verl (loan)	37	(11)
2023–2024	→ Greuther Fürth (loan)	44	(3)
2024–	SV Elversberg	72	(19)

International career^{‡}
2023–	Bulgaria	15	(0)
- * Club domestic league appearances and goals as of 30 October 2026 ‡ National team caps and goals as of 16 November 2026

Lukas Emanuel Petkov (born 1 November 2000) is a professional footballer who plays as a forward for Bundesliga club SV Elversberg. Born in Germany, he plays for the Bulgaria national team.

== Club career ==
Born in Friedberg, Germany, Petkov has Bulgarian descent from his father. His paternal grandfather is from a village in Southeastern Bulgaria. He began his youth career at SV Mering, a small local football club in Augsburg, before joining the academy at FC Augsburg in 2008.

On 22 May 2021, Petkov made his Bundesliga debut for FC Augsburg in a 5–2 defeat against Bayern Munich. On 2 June 2021, he signed a new contract with the club until June 2024, and was then sent for a season long loan to 3. Liga team SC Verl. On 31 January 2023 Augsburg extended Petkov's contract until the summer of 2026 and send him on loan to 2. Bundesliga team Greuther Fürth until the end of season. On 19 June 2023, Greuther Fürth extended Petkov's loan until 30 June 2024.

On 21 August 2024, Petkov signed a three-year contract with SV Elversberg.

== International career ==
In January 2022 Aleksandar Dimitrov, the manager of Bulgaria U21, confirmed that Petkov expressed his desire to represent Bulgaria and its subject of gaining citizenship. In January 2023 Bulgarian Football Union confirmed Petkov agreed to play for Bulgaria and they are working on making him available to debut in 2023. He received his first call up for Bulgaria on 21 August 2023 for the matches against Iran and Montenegro. On 7 September 2023, Petkov earned his first cap, playing as a starter in the 0–1 loss against Iran in a friendly match.

== Career statistics ==
=== Club ===
As of match played 30 October 2026

Appearances and goals by club, season and competition
Club	Season	League			DFB-Pokal		Europe		Other		Total	
Club	Season	Division	Apps	Goals	Apps	Goals	Apps	Goals	Apps	Goals	Apps	Goals
FC Augsburg II	2018–19	Regionalliga Bayern	3	0	–		–		–		3	0
FC Augsburg II	2019–21	Regionalliga Bayern	23	5	2	0	–		–		25	5
FC Augsburg II	2022–23	Regionalliga Bayern	3	1	–		–		–		3	1
FC Augsburg II	Total		29	6	2	0	0	0	0	0	31	6
FC Augsburg	2020–21	Bundesliga	1	0	0	0	–		–		1	0
FC Augsburg	2022–23	Bundesliga	7	0	1	0	–		–		8	0
FC Augsburg	Total		8	0	1	0	0	0	0	0	9	0
SC Verl (loan)	2021–22	3. Liga	37	11	0	0	–		4 (Note: Appearances in Westphalian Cup)	1	36	11
Greuther Fürth (loan)	2022–23	2. Bundesliga	15	2	0	0	–		–		15	2
Greuther Fürth (loan)	2023–24	2. Bundesliga	29	1	2	0	–		–		31	1
Greuther Fürth (loan)	Total		44	3	2	0	0	0	0	0	46	3
SV Elversberg	2024–25	2. Bundesliga	30	4	1	0	–		2 (Note: Appearances in Bundesliga promotion play-offs)	1	33	5
SV Elversberg	2025–26	2. Bundesliga	34	13	2	0	–		–		36	13
SV Elversberg	2026–27	Bundesliga	8	2	2	0	–		–		10	2
SV Elversberg	Total		72	19	5	0	0	0	2	1	79	20
Career total			187	40	8	0	0	0	5	2	200	42

=== International ===
As of match played 16 November 2026

Appearances and goals by national team and year
National team	Year	Apps	Goals
Bulgaria	2023	4	0
Bulgaria	2024	1	0
Bulgaria	2025	3	0
Bulgaria	2026	7	0
Total		15	0
