= Luca Schnellbacher =

German footballer (born 1994)

Personal information
- Full name: Luca Pascal Schnellbacher
- Date of birth: 6 May 1994 (age 32)
- Place of birth: Groß-Umstadt, Germany
- Height: 1.80 m (5 ft 11 in)
- Position: Striker

Team information
- Current team: SV Elversberg
- Number: 24

Youth career
- –2012: Darmstadt 98
- 2012–2013: Eintracht Frankfurt

Senior career*
Years	Team	Apps	(Gls)
2013–2014	SV Wehen Wiesbaden II	6	(3)
2013–2017	SV Wehen Wiesbaden	116	(18)
2017–2019	VfR Aalen	71	(13)
2019–2020	Preußen Münster	33	(5)
2020–	SV Elversberg	185	(55)
- * Club domestic league appearances and goals as of 30 October 2026

Luca Pascal Schnellbacher (born 6 May 1994) is a German professional footballer who plays as a striker for Bundesliga club SV Elversberg.

== Club career ==
On 21 May 2019, SC Preußen Münster announced that they had signed Schnellbacher for the upcoming 2019–20 season.

== Career statistics ==
As of match played 30 October 2026

Appearances and goals by club, season and competition
Club	Season	League			DFB-Pokal		Other		Total	
Club	Season	Division	Apps	Goals	Apps	Goals	Apps	Goals	Apps	Goals
Wehen Wiesbaden II	2013–14	Hessenliga	6	3	—		—		6	3
Wehen Wiesbaden	2013–14	3. Liga	26	4	0	0	3 (Note: Appearances in Hessian Cup)	0	29	4
Wehen Wiesbaden	2014–15	3. Liga	37	4	1	0	3	2	41	6
Wehen Wiesbaden	2015–16	3. Liga	30	8	0	0	3	3	33	11
Wehen Wiesbaden	2016–17	3. Liga	23	2	0	0	3	3	26	5
Wehen Wiesbaden	Total		116	18	1	0	12	8	129	26
VfR Aalen	2017–18	3. Liga	35	10	0	0	4 (Note: Appearances in Württemberg Cup)	4	39	14
VfR Aalen	2018–19	3. Liga	36	3	0	0	3	0	39	3
VfR Aalen	Total		71	13	0	0	7	4	78	17
Preußen Münster	2019–20	3. Liga	33	5	0	0	2 (Note: Appearances in Westphalian Cup)	0	35	5
SV Elversberg	2019–20	Regionalliga Südwest	0	0	0	0	3 (Note: Appearance(s) in Saarland Cup)	3	3	3
SV Elversberg	2020–21	Regionalliga Südwest	35	14	2	2	1	0	38	16
SV Elversberg	2021–22	Regionalliga Südwest	33	10	1	2	4	3	38	15
SV Elversberg	2022–23	3. Liga	27	14	2	1	3	1	32	16
SV Elversberg	2023–24	2. Bundesliga	30	8	1	0	—		31	8
SV Elversberg	2024–25	2. Bundesliga	29	6	2	1	2 (Note: Appearances in Bundesliga promotion play-offs)	0	33	7
SV Elversberg	2025–26	2. Bundesliga	28	3	2	0	—		30	3
SV Elversberg	2026–27	Bundesliga	3	0	2	1	—		5	1
SV Elversberg	Total		185	55	12	7	13	7	210	69
Career total			411	94	13	7	34	19	458	120
