= Maximilian Rohr =

German footballer (born 1995)

Personal information
- Date of birth: 27 June 1995 (age 31)
- Place of birth: Bad Friedrichshall, Germany
- Height: 1.93 m (6 ft 4 in)
- Position: Centre-back

Team information
- Current team: SV Elversberg
- Number: 31

Youth career
- TSG Heilbronn
- –2011: Karlsruher SC
- 2011–2012: Astoria Walldorf
- 2012–2014: VfB Eppingen

Senior career*
Years	Team	Apps	(Gls)
2014–2016	VfB Eppingen	64	(17)
2014	VfB Eppingen II	1	(2)
2016–2018	SSV Reutlingen	64	(2)
2018–2019	SGV Freiberg	34	(7)
2019–2020	Carl Zeiss Jena	27	(3)
2020–2021	Hamburger SV II	3	(0)
2021–2023	Hamburger SV	14	(0)
2022–2023	→ SC Paderborn (loan)	24	(3)
2023–2024	SC Paderborn	4	(0)
2023–2024	SC Paderborn II	6	(0)
2024–	SV Elversberg	64	(4)
- * Club domestic league appearances and goals as of 30 October 2026

Maximilian Rohr (born 27 June 1995) is a German professional footballer who plays as a centre-back for Bundesliga club SV Elversberg.

== Career ==
Rohr made his professional debut for Carl Zeiss Jena in the 3. Liga on 4 August 2019, starting in the away match against FSV Zwickau. He was sent off in the 82nd minute, with the match finishing as a 2–0 loss.

On 31 August 2022, Rohr joined SC Paderborn on a season-long loan, with an option to buy. On 27 May 2023, the option was exercised and he joined the club on a permanent basis.

On 5 August 2024, Rohr signed a two-year contract with SV Elversberg.

== Career statistics ==
As of match played 30 October 2026

Appearances and goals by club, season and competition
Club	Season	League			DFB-Pokal		Other		Total	
Club	Season	Division	Apps	Goals	Apps	Goals	Apps	Goals	Apps	Goals
VfB Eppingen	2014–15	Landesliga	32	8	—		—		32	8
VfB Eppingen	2015–16	Landesliga	32	9	—		—		32	9
VfB Eppingen	Total		64	17	—		—		64	17
VfB Eppingen II	2014–15	Kreisliga Sinsheim	1	2	—		—		1	2
SSV Reutlingen	2016–17	Oberliga Baden-Württemberg	31	0	—		5 (Note: Appearances in Baden Cup)	1	36	1
SSV Reutlingen	2017–18	Oberliga Baden-Württemberg	33	2	—		2	0	35	2
SSV Reutlingen	Total		64	2	—		7	1	71	3
SGV Freiberg	2018–19	Oberliga Baden-Württemberg	34	7	—		6	0	40	7
Carl Zeiss Jena	2019–20	3. Liga	25	3	0	0	3 (Note: Appearances in Thuringian Cup)	0	28	3
Hamburger SV II	2020–21	Regionalliga Nord	3	0	—		—		3	0
Hamburger SV	2021–22	2. Bundesliga	9	0	1	0	2 (Note: Appearance(s) in Bundesliga promotion play-offs)	0	12	0
Hamburger SV	2022–23	2. Bundesliga	5	0	1	0	—		6	0
Hamburger SV	Total		14	0	2	0	2	0	18	0
SC Paderborn (loan)	2022–23	2. Bundesliga	24	3	2	0	—		26	3
SC Paderborn	2023–24	2. Bundesliga	4	0	1	0	—		5	0
SC Paderborn II	2023–24	Regionalliga West	6	0	—		—		6	0
SV Elversberg	2024–25	2. Bundesliga	25	0	1	0	1	0	27	0
SV Elversberg	2025–26	2. Bundesliga	31	3	1	0	—		32	3
SV Elversberg	2026–27	Bundesliga	8	1	1	0	—		9	1
SV Elversberg	Total		64	4	3	0	1	0	68	4
Career total			303	38	8	0	19	1	330	39
