= Semih Şahin =

German footballer (born 1999)

Personal information
- Date of birth: 22 December 1999 (age 26)
- Place of birth: Mannheim, Germany
- Height: 1.77 m (5 ft 10 in)
- Position: Midfielder

Team information
- Current team: 1. FC Kaiserslautern
- Number: 8

Youth career
- 2004–2009: VfR Mannheim
- 2009–2010: VfL Neckarau
- 2010–2018: Waldhof Mannheim

Senior career*
Years	Team	Apps	(Gls)
2018–2019	FC Astoria Walldorf	31	(2)
2020–2021	TSG 1899 Hoffenheim II	32	(1)
2021–2025	SV Elversberg	106	(7)
2025–	1. FC Kaiserslautern	33	(4)
- * Club domestic league appearances and goals as of 21:39, 8 August 2026 (UTC)

Semih Şahin (born 22 December 1999) is a German professional footballer who plays as a midfielder for 2. Bundesliga side 1. FC Kaiserslautern.

== Club career ==
Born in Mannheim, Germany, Şahin started his professional career with amateur FC Astoria Walldorf in Regionalliga Südwest after graduating through the youth ranks of Waldhof Mannheim in 2018. After spending one year, and making 31 appearances and scoring 2 goals and providing 7 assists, he switched to TSG 1899 Hoffenheim II in the same tier on 8 December 2019.

The 2020–21 season saw him being a regular starter for the Hoffenheim reserve side. On 29 August 2021, he moved to SV Elversberg and signed a two-year contract with the fourth tier side. The club went on to win the 2022–23 3. Liga season, and won promotion to the 2. Bundesliga for the first time.

On 1 July 2025, Şahin joined 1. FC Kaiserslautern for a transfer fee of €1.5 million.

== Career statistics ==
As of match played 9 August 2026

Appearances and goals by club, season and competition
Club	Season	League			National cup		Other		Total	
Club	Season	Division	Apps	Goals	Apps	Goals	Apps	Goals	Apps	Goals
FC Astoria Walldorf	2018–19	Regionalliga Südwest	14	0	—		—		14	0
FC Astoria Walldorf	2019–20	Regionalliga Südwest	17	2	—		—		17	2
FC Astoria Walldorf	Total		31	2	—		—		31	2
TSG 1899 Hoffenheim II	2019–20	Regionalliga Südwest	1	0	—		—		1	0
TSG 1899 Hoffenheim II	2020–21	Regionalliga Südwest	31	1	—		—		31	1
TSG 1899 Hoffenheim II	Total		32	1	—		—		32	1
SV Elversberg	2021–22	Regionalliga Südwest	27	0	—		—		27	0
SV Elversberg	2022–23	3. Liga	30	2	2	0	—		32	2
SV Elversberg	2023–24	2. Bundesliga	27	1	1	0	—		28	1
SV Elversberg	2024–25	2. Bundesliga	22	4	1	0	2	0	25	4
SV Elversberg	Total		106	7	4	0	2	0	112	7
1. FC Kaiserslautern	2025–26	2. Bundesliga	32	4	3	0	—		35	4
1. FC Kaiserslautern	2026–27	2. Bundesliga	1	0	0	0	—		1	0
1. FC Kaiserslautern	Total		33	4	3	0	—		36	4
Career total			212	14	7	0	2	0	221	14

== Honours ==
SV Elversberg

- 3. Liga: 2022–23
