= Paul Stock =

German association football player

Personal information
- Date of birth: 8 January 1997 (age 29)
- Place of birth: Landau, Germany
- Height: 1.88 m (6 ft 2 in)
- Position: Forward

Team information
- Current team: Hansa Rostock
- Number: 10

Youth career
- –2016: FSV Offenbach

Senior career*
Years	Team	Apps	(Gls)
2016	FSV Offenbach	9	(0)
2016–2018	SV Rülzheim	36	(22)
2018–2020	FV Dudenhofen	65	(27)
2021–2023	TSV Steinbach Haiger	82	(20)
2023–2025	SV Elversberg	49	(6)
2025–	Hansa Rostock	12	(0)
- * Club domestic league appearances and goals as of 28 May 2026

Paul Stock (born 8 January 1997) is a German association football player who plays for 3. Liga club Hansa Rostock.

== Career ==
Stock started to play football for the youth teams of FSV Offenbach. After going through all the youth teams of the club, he had his first appearances for the regular team in the Verbandsliga Südwest in 2016. In the summer of the same year, he joined the Landesliga Südwest team SV Rülzheim. After scoring 22 goals in 36 appearances, he joined FV Dudenhofen in the Oberliga Rheinland-Pfalz/Saar. There he was a regular for nearly three seasons, in this time he played in 65 matches and scored 27 goals. In January 2021, he was transferred to the Regionalliga Südwest club TSV Steinbach Haiger. Here he was also a regular and even became team captain. He scored 20 goals in 82 appearances for TSV Steinbach Haiger.

In the summer of 2023, he joined SV Elversberg, a club that was just promoted to the 2. Bundesliga, Germany's second-highest division in association football. He made his first appearance in professional football on 29 July 2023, when he started in the first match of the season against Hannover 96, which ended 2:2.

On 29 May 2025, Stock signed a contract with Hansa Rostock.
