= Jean Romaric Kevin Koffi =

Ivorian footballer (born 1986)

Kevin Koffi
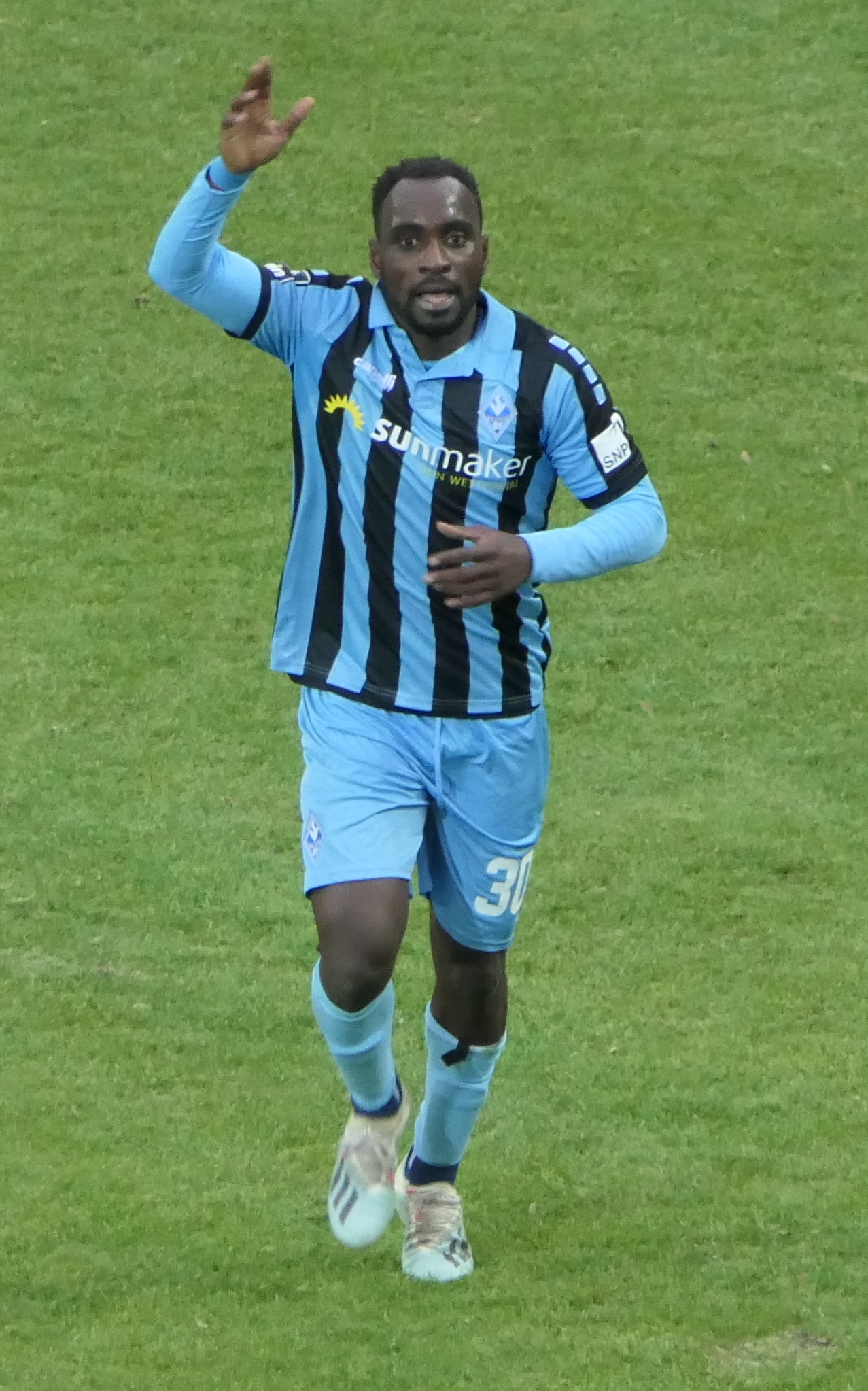
- Koffi with Waldhof Mannheim in 2019

Personal information
- Full name: Jean Romaric Kevin Koffi
- Date of birth: 25 June 1986 (age 40)
- Place of birth: Aboisso, Ivory Coast
- Height: 1.81 m (5 ft 11 in)
- Position: Forward

Youth career
- 2002–2004: Modena

Senior career*
Years	Team	Apps	(Gls)
2004–2007	Virtus Castelfranco	95	(28)
2007–2010	Modena	29	(3)
2010–2011	Sanremese	5	(0)
2011	Napoli	0	(0)
2011	→ Siracusa (loan)	10	(0)
2011	Roma	0	(0)
2011–2012	→ Boussu Dour Borinage (loan)	24	(12)
2012–2014	Boussu Dour Borinage	46	(20)
2014–2016	Westerlo	56	(13)
2016–2017	RWS Bruxelles	22	(13)
2017–2019	SV Elversberg	64	(31)
2019–2020	Waldhof Mannheim	37	(3)
2020–2024	SV Elversberg	109	(37)
- * Club domestic league appearances and goals as of 23 May 2024

Jean Romaric Kevin Koffi (born 25 June 1986) is an Ivorian professional footballer who plays as a forward.

== Career ==
A youth product of Modena, Koffi left for Virtus Castelfranco of Serie D in the summer of 2004, a team in the Province of Modena.

In the summer of 2007, Modena re-signed Koffi. After playing three times in 2009–10 Serie B, he was released. In October 2010, he signed for Seconda Divisione side Sanremese, but he was released in December. However, on 31 January 2011, he signed for Serie A team Napoli and immediately loaned to Siracusa (swapped with youngster Andrea Petta). It was because when Koffi became a free agent, Napoli would got a non-EU signing from abroad quota to "replace" Koffi.

On 15 August 2011, he signed for another Serie A team, Roma. He moved to the Belgian Second Division side Royal Boussu Dour Borinage on the same day. In the same window, Roma also signed Alain Mendy and released him to Belgium in order to get the non-EU quota.

On 31 January 2014, he signed for Westerlo.
