= Dominik Martinović =

German footballer

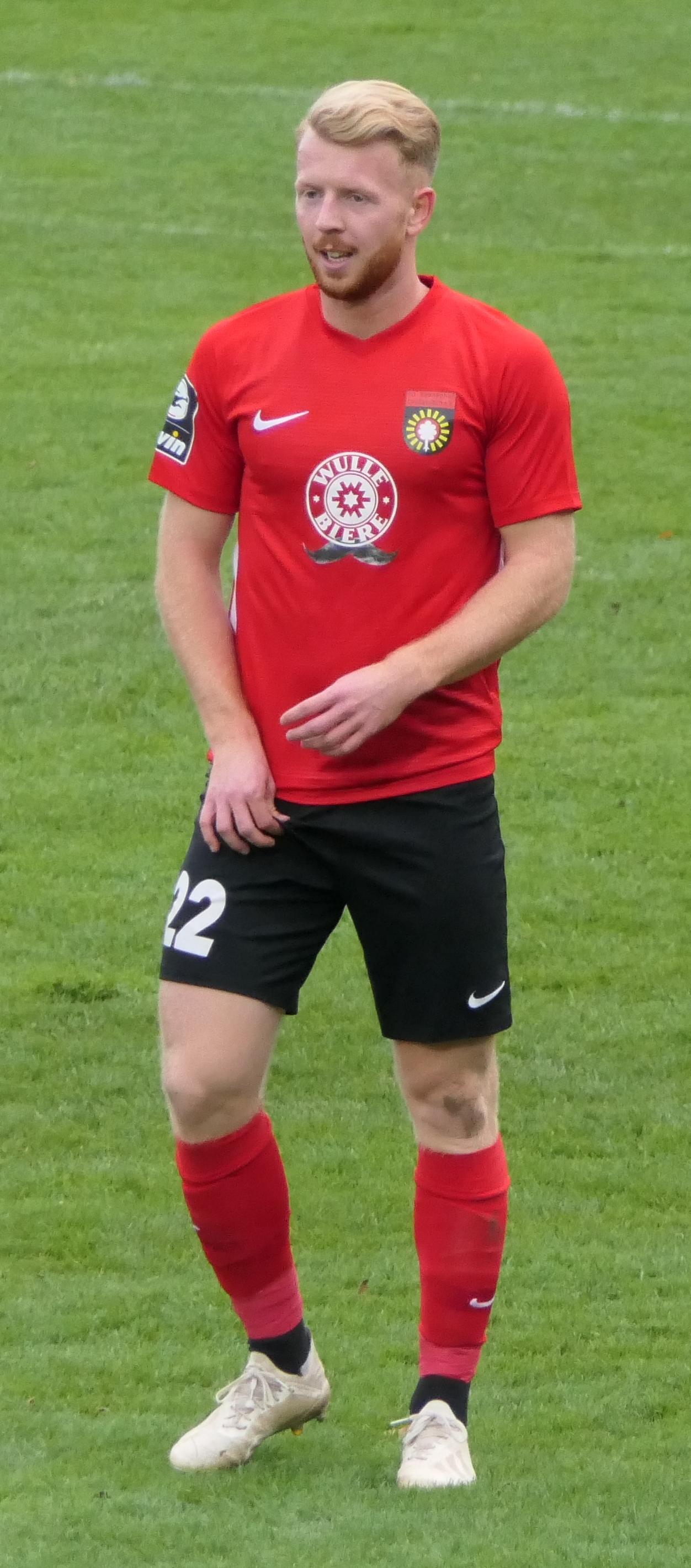
- Martinović in 2019

Personal information
- Full name: Dominik Martinović
- Date of birth: 25 March 1997 (age 29)
- Place of birth: Stuttgart, Germany
- Height: 1.85 m (6 ft 1 in)
- Position: Forward

Team information
- Current team: SSV Ulm
- Number: 10

Youth career
- –2013: VfB Stuttgart
- 2013–2016: Bayern Munich

Senior career*
Years	Team	Apps	(Gls)
2016–2017	RB Leipzig II	23	(7)
2017–2018	Wehen Wiesbaden	4	(1)
2019–2020	Sonnenhof Großaspach	32	(6)
2020–2023	Waldhof Mannheim	105	(36)
2023–2024	SV Elversberg	20	(1)
2024–2025	Slaven Belupo	11	(1)
2025	Rot-Weiss Essen	21	(0)
2025–	SSV Ulm	1	(1)

International career^{‡}
2012	Germany U15	4	(4)
2012	Germany U16	2	(3)
2016	Croatia U19	3	(1)
- * Club domestic league appearances and goals as of 8 October 2025 ‡ National team caps and goals as of 20 October 2022

Dominik Martinović (born 25 March 1997) is a professional footballer who plays as a forward for German club SSV Ulm. Born in Germany, he represented both Germany and Croatia on youth international levels.

== Club career ==
On 27 July 2020, following Großaspach's relegation, he signed for Waldhof Mannheim.

On 3 August 2024, Martinović signed with Slaven Belupo in Croatia.

On 6 January 2025, he returned to Germany and joined Rot-Weiss Essen in 3. Liga.

On 2 September 2025, Martinović transferred to fellow 3. Liga club SSV Ulm.
