= Jannik Rochelt =

German footballer

Personal information
- Date of birth: 27 September 1998 (age 28)
- Place of birth: Lindenberg im Allgäu, Germany
- Height: 1.83 m (6 ft 0 in)
- Positions: Attacking midfielder; winger

Team information
- Current team: Arminia Bielefeld
- Number: 10

Youth career
- Rot-Weiß Weiler
- –2013: VfB Friedrichshafen
- 2013–2017: FC Memmingen

Senior career*
| Years | Team | Apps | (Gls) |
| 2017–2019 | FC Memmingen | 39 | (13) |
| 2019–2021 | Bayern Munich II | 38 | (2) |
| 2021–2022 | SSV Ulm | 51 | (3) |
| 2022–2024 | SV Elversberg | 70 | (16) |
| 2024–2026 | Hannover 96 | 40 | (2) |
| 2026 | → Arminia Bielefeld (loan) | 17 | (1) |
| 2026– | Arminia Bielefeld | 0 | (0) |
- * Club domestic league appearances and goals as of 18 May 2026

Jannik Rochelt (born 27 September 1998) is a German professional footballer who plays as an attacking midfielder or winger for 2. Bundesliga club Arminia Bielefeld.

== Career ==
Rochelt made his professional debut for Bayern Munich II in the 3. Liga on 20 July 2019, starting in the away match against Würzburger Kickers.

On 17 July 2024, Rochelt signed a contract with Hannover 96 for three seasons, with an extension option. He was loaned out to Arminia Bielefeld for the second half of the 2025–26 season. On 24 June 2026, the transfer to Arminia was made permanent.

== Career statistics ==
As of match played 21 December 2025

Appearances and goals by club, season and competition
| Club | Season | League | | | DFB-Pokal | | Other | | Total | |
| Club | Season | Division | Apps | Goals | Apps | Goals | Apps | Goals | Apps | Goals |
|---|---|---|---|---|---|---|---|---|---|---|
| FC Memmingen | 2017–18 | Regionalliga Bayern | 17 | 5 | — | | 2 (Note: Appearances in the Regionalliga Bayern relegation play-offs) | 1 | 19 | 6 |
| FC Memmingen | 2018–19 | Regionalliga Bayern | 22 | 8 | — | | — | | 22 | 8 |
| FC Memmingen | Total | | 39 | 13 | 0 | 0 | 2 | 1 | 41 | 14 |
| Bayern Munich II | 2018–19 | Regionalliga Bayern | 14 | 1 | — | | 2 (Note: Appearances in the Regionalliga promotion play-offs) | 1 | 16 | 2 |
| Bayern Munich II | 2019–20 | 3. Liga | 14 | 1 | — | | — | | 14 | 1 |
| Bayern Munich II | 2020–21 | 3. Liga | 10 | 0 | — | | — | | 10 | 0 |
| Bayern Munich II | Total | | 38 | 2 | 0 | 0 | 2 | 1 | 40 | 3 |
| SSV Ulm | 2020–21 | Regionalliga Südwest | 20 | 2 | 1 | 0 | — | | 21 | 2 |
| SSV Ulm | 2021–22 | Regionalliga Südwest | 31 | 1 | 1 | 0 | — | | 32 | 1 |
| SSV Ulm | Total | | 51 | 3 | 2 | 0 | 0 | 0 | 53 | 3 |
| SV Elversberg | 2022–23 | 3. Liga | 37 | 12 | 2 | 1 | — | | 39 | 13 |
| SV Elversberg | 2023–24 | 2. Bundesliga | 33 | 4 | 1 | 0 | — | | 34 | 4 |
| SV Elversberg | Total | | 70 | 16 | 3 | 1 | 0 | 0 | 73 | 17 |
| Hannover 96 | 2024–25 | 2. Bundesliga | 27 | 2 | 1 | 0 | — | | 28 | 2 |
| Hannover 96 | 2025–26 | 2. Bundesliga | 13 | 0 | 1 | 0 | — | | 14 | 0 |
| Hannover 96 | Total | | 40 | 2 | 2 | 0 | 0 | 0 | 42 | 2 |
| Arminia Bielefeld (loan) | 2025–26 | 2. Bundesliga | 0 | 0 | 0 | 0 | — | | 0 | 0 |
| Career Total | | | 238 | 36 | 7 | 1 | 4 | 2 | 249 | 39 |
