= Spiesen-Elversberg =

- Municipality
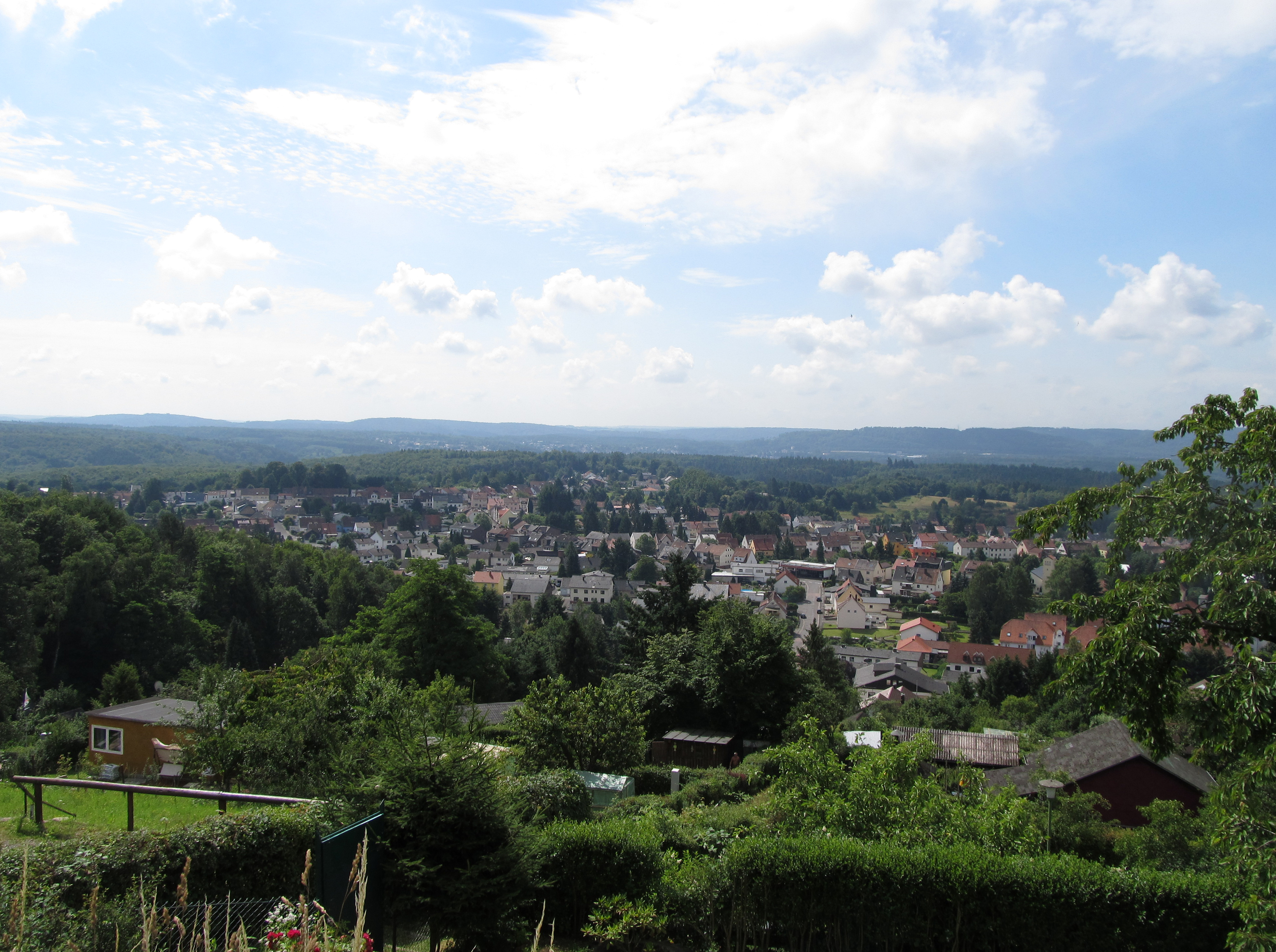

- Coat of arms

- Location of Spiesen-Elversberg within Neunkirchen district
- Interactive map of Spiesen-Elversberg
- Location within Germany Location within Saarland
- Coordinates: 49°19′N 7°8′E
- Country: Germany
- State: Saarland
- District: Neunkirchen
- Subdivisions: 2

Government
  - Mayor (2019–29): Bernd Huf

Area
  - Total: 11.42 km^{2} (4.41 sq mi)
- Elevation: 325 m (1,066 ft)

Population (2025-12-31)
  - Total: 13,078
  - Density: 1,145/km^{2} (2,966/sq mi)
- Time zone: UTC+01:00 (CET)
  - Summer (DST): UTC+02:00 (CEST)
- Postal codes: 66579–66583
- Dialling codes: 06821
- Vehicle registration: NK
- Website: www.spiesen-elversberg.info

Spiesen-Elversberg (German pronunciation: [ˈʃpiːzn̩ ˈʔɛlvɐsbɛʁk]) is a municipality in the district of Neunkirchen, in Saarland, Germany. It is situated approximately 4 km (2.5 mi) southwest of Neunkirchen, and 15 km (9.3 mi) northeast of Saarbrücken.

== Sport ==
SV Elversberg is a professional association football club which currently plays its home matches at the Waldstadion an der Kaiserlinde. The team has experienced success in recent years, rising three tiers in the German football league system. It won promotion to the 1. Bundesliga for the first time in their history after finishing runner-up at the 2025–26 2. Bundesliga. It is currently the highest ranked team in Saarland, having surpassed 1. FC Saarbrücken in 2023.
