= Waldstadion an der Kaiserlinde =

Football stadium in Germany

Coordinates: 49°19′7″N 7°7′18″E

Ursapharm-Arena
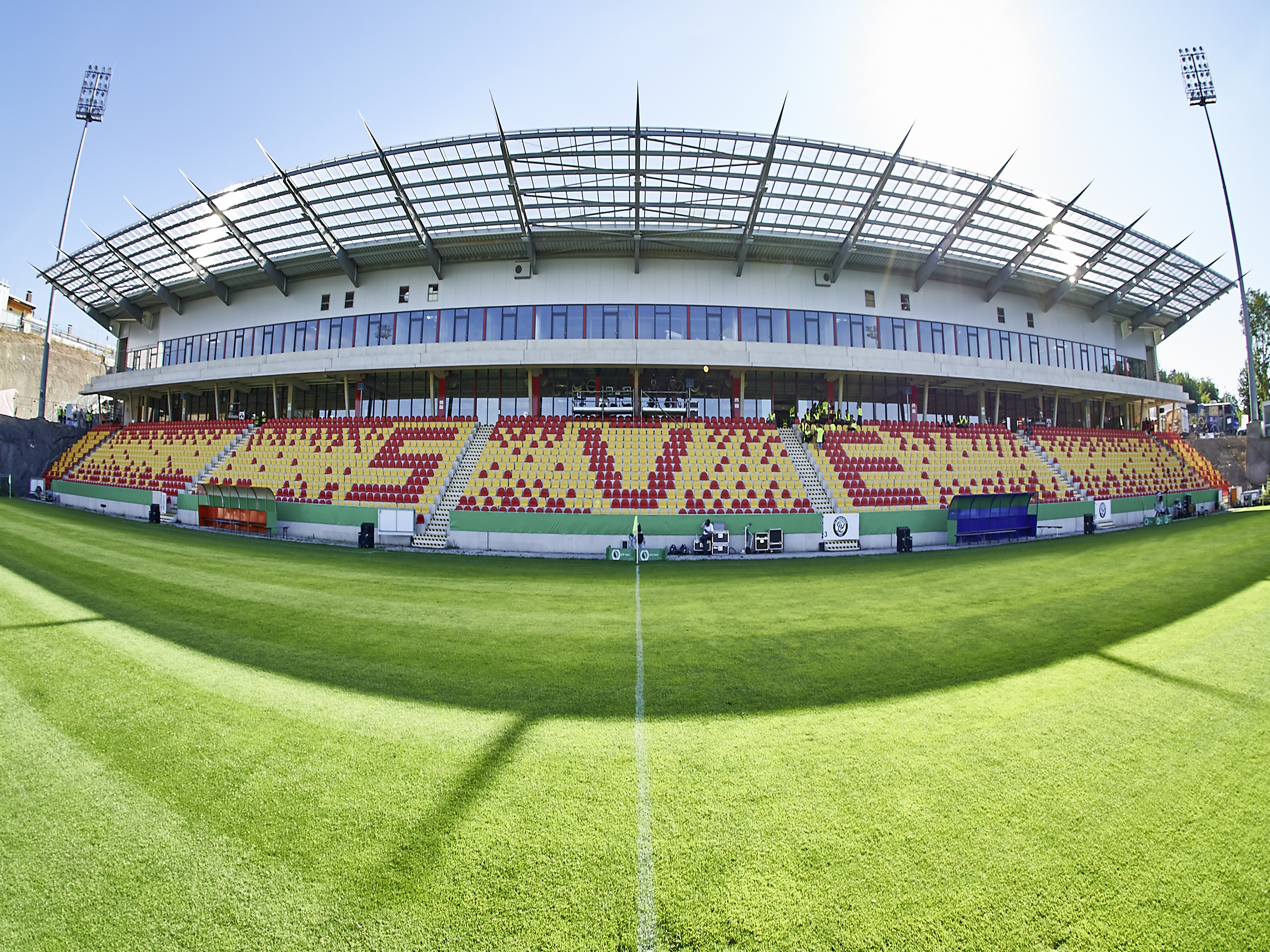
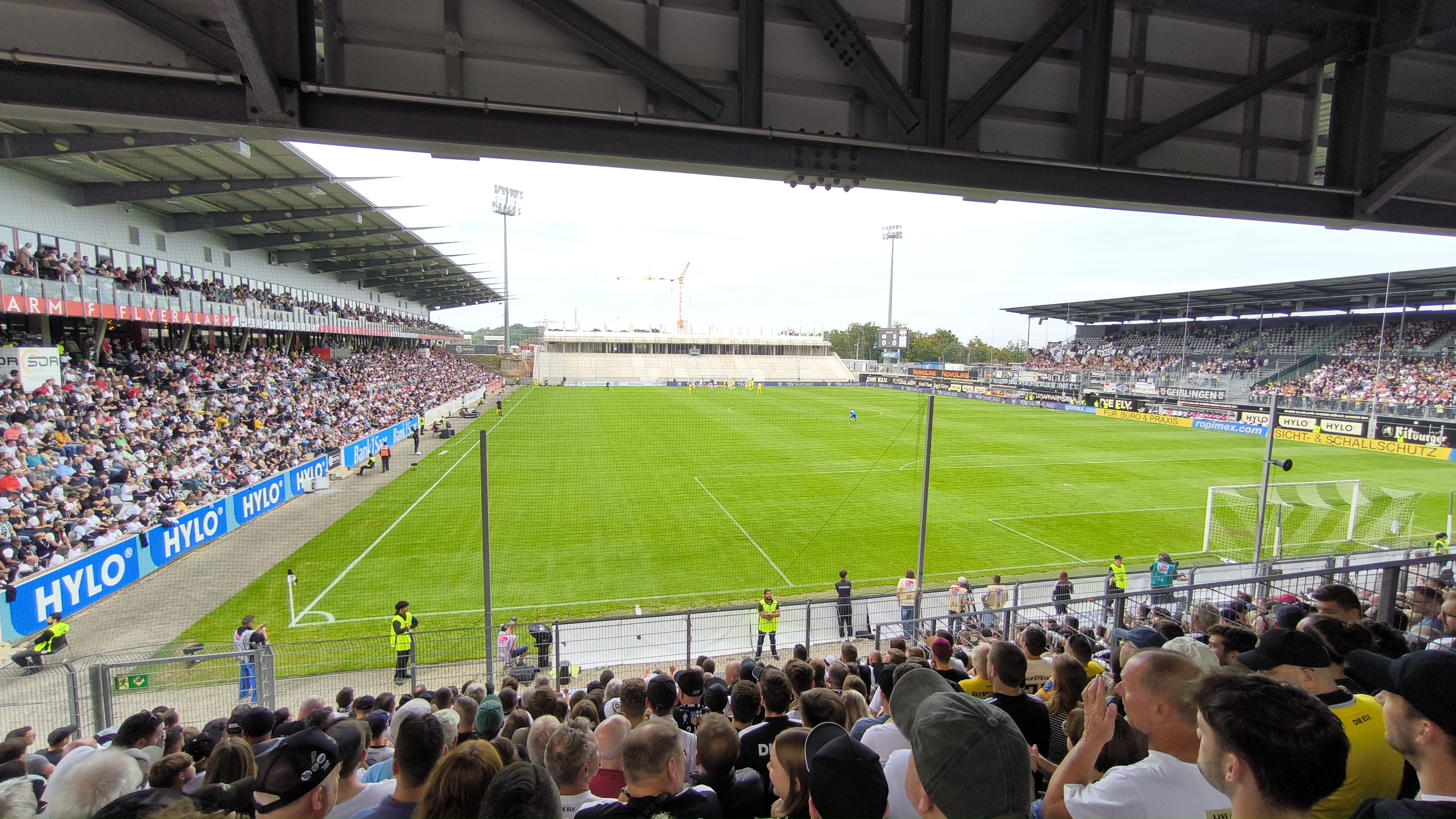
- Interactive map of Ursapharm-Arena
- Former names: Waldstadion an der Kaiserlinde
- Location: Spiesen-Elversberg, Germany
- Owner: Kaiserlinde Stadiongesellschaft mbH & Co. KG
- Operator: Madera Arena & Event GmbH
- Capacity: 14,221
- Surface: Grass
- Field size: 105 × 68 m

Construction
- Opened: 1983
- Renovated: 2013, 2026

Tenant
- SV Elversberg

Waldstadion an der Kaiserlinde, officially Ursapharm-Arena an der Kaiserlinde, is a multi-use stadium in Spiesen-Elversberg, Germany. It is currently used mostly for association football matches and is the home stadium of SV Elversberg. The stadium is able to hold 14,221 spectators.

== History ==
In November 2014, pharmaceutical company Ursapharm acquired the stadium naming rights for ten years, with the venue renamed the Ursapharm-Arena an der Kaiserlinde. The nearly 100-year-old Kaiserlinde tree, which gave the stadium its name, was destroyed by Cyclone Niklas in March 2015.

Following SV Elversberg’s promotion to the 3. Liga in 2022, the home stand was roofed, with further plans announced to cover the opposite and away stands. After promotion to the 2. Bundesliga in 2023, additional redevelopment was required to satisfy DFL regulations. Temporary steel tube stands were used during the club’s first second-division season, while construction of a new permanent West Stand began in July 2024.

With promotion to the Bundesliga in 2026, the stadium was required to be expanded to a minimum capacity of 15,000 spectators in accordance with DFL regulations. The redevelopment plans were scheduled for completion by spring 2027, with a temporary permit allowing the club to continue gradual upgrades in the meantime.
