= SV Elversberg =

German football club

- Full name: Sportvereinigung 07 Elversberg e.V.
- Nicknames: Schwarz und Weiß (The Black and White)
- Founded: 1907; 119 years ago (as FC Germania Elversberg)
- Stadium: Ursapharm-Arena
- Capacity: 14,221
- President: Dominik Holzer
- Head coach: Vincent Wagner
- League: Bundesliga
- 2025–26: 2. Bundesliga, 2nd of 18 (promoted)
- Website: sv07elversberg.de
Home colours	Away colours	Third colours

Sportvereinigung 07 Elversberg e. V., is a professional German association football club, located in Spiesen-Elversberg, Saarland. The club competes in the Bundesliga, the highest tier of the German football league system, after promotion from 2.Bundesliga at the end of the 2025–26 season.

== History ==
Logo used until 2010

The club was founded in 1907 as FC Germania Elversberg. It was dissolved in 1914, but then re-constituted in 1918 as Sportvereinigung VfB Elversberg, spending a season in the tier-one Kreisliga Saar in 1921–22. After World War II a number of local associations came together to form Sportgemeinde Elversberg. The current club became independent of SG as SV Elversberg VfB 07 in 1952. From 1951 to 1960 SV played in the Amateurliga Saarland (III), but then dropped into tier IV and V football until 1980 when they re-emerged in the Amateur Oberliga Südwest (III) for a span of seven seasons. After nearly another decade spent between the Verbandsliga Saarland (IV) and the Landesliga Saarland/Nordost (V) the club returned to tier III football in the Regionalliga West/Südwest.

Since 1998, SV Elversberg has played in the Regionalliga Süd (III) as a lower table side. For the 2008–09 season, the club belonged to the new Regionalliga West where it stayed until 2012 when it became part of the new Regionalliga Südwest. In 2012–13, the club finished runners-up in the new league and qualified for the promotion play-off to the 3. Liga where it overcame the reserve team of TSV 1860 München to earn promotion to this league.

SV Elversberg lasted for only one season in the 3. Liga, suffering relegation alongside fellow Saar side 1. FC Saarbrücken back to the Regionalliga. They finished runners-up in the Regionalliga Südwest in 2015–16 but lost to FSV Zwickau in the promotion play-off and had to remain in the league. The following season, they won the league but were denied promotion by SpVgg Unterhaching, who beat them 5–2 on aggregate in another promotion play-off.

In the 2021–22 season, SV Elversberg won the Regionalliga Südwest under coach Horst Steffen, earning promotion to the 3. Liga. The club continued their rise by winning the 3. Liga in 2022–23, securing historic promotion to the 2. Bundesliga for the first time ever in history on 21 May 2023, before they managed to win the league on the final matchday following a 2–1 victory over Ingolstadt. In their debut 2. Bundesliga season, they finished 11th, solidifying their status in the league. In the 2024–25 season, SV Elversberg secured third place in the 2. Bundesliga, earning a spot in the promotion play-offs against 1. FC Heidenheim, who had finished 16th in the Bundesliga. However, they were defeated 4–3 on aggregate, following a 2–1 home loss that was sealed in stoppage time. In the 2025–26 season, the club earned promotion to the Bundesliga for the first time in their history from next season after finishing as runners-up, following a 3–0 victory over Preußen Münster on the final matchday.

== Players ==
=== Current squad ===
As of 2 September 2026

Note: Flags indicate national team as defined under FIFA eligibility rules; some limited exceptions apply. Players may hold more than one non-FIFA nationality.

No.	Pos.	Nation	Player
1	GK	GER	Frank Lehmann
2	DF	THA	Nicholas Mickelson
3	DF	FRA	Florian Le Joncour
4	DF	GER	Luis Seifert
6	MF	GUI	Amara Condé
7	MF	GER	Maurice Krattenmacher
8	MF	POL	Łukasz Poręba
9	FW	GER	Noel Futkeu (on loan from Eintracht Frankfurt)
10	MF	GER	Noah Darvich (on loan from VfB Stuttgart)
12	GK	GER	Elias Etringer
15	MF	GER	Raif Adam
16	FW	GER	Luca Pfeiffer
17	MF	GER	Frederik Schmahl
19	DF	GER	Lukas Pinckert (captain)

No.	Pos.	Nation	Player
20	GK	AUT	Nicolas Kristof
21	DF	GER	Lasse Günther
24	FW	GER	Luca Schnellbacher
25	FW	BUL	Lukas Petkov
26	DF	GER	Luca Sirch
28	GK	GER	Tim Boss
29	MF	GER	Tom Zimmerschied
30	DF	GHA	Jan Gyamerah
31	DF	GER	Maximilian Rohr
39	MF	USA	Cole Campbell
40	MF	GER	Francis Onyeka (on loan from Bayer Leverkusen)
42	FW	FRA	David Mokwa
43	DF	GER	Felix Keidel

=== Out on loan ===
Note: Flags indicate national team as defined under FIFA eligibility rules; some limited exceptions apply. Players may hold more than one non-FIFA nationality.

No.	Pos.	Nation	Player
—	MF	GER	Jason Çeka (at Cambuur until 30 June 2027)

== Coaching staff ==
Position	Name
Head coach	(Germany) Vincent Wagner
Assistant coach	(Germany) Mike Frantz (Germany) Patrick Henle (Germany) Pascal Bieler
Goalkeeper coach	(Germany) Sascha Purket
Athletic coach	(Germany) Tobias Tröß
Rehabilitation trainer	(Germany) Michael Schwerhoff
Video analyst	(Germany) Franz Dietrich (Germany) Marko Rieke
Equipment manager	(Germany) Volker Lefebre
Team manager	(Germany) Daniel Ocvirk
Head physiotherapist	(Germany) Melanie Hubert
Physiotherapist	(Germany) Ricardo Bernardy (Germany) Julian Brans (Germany) Robin Maier
Team doctor	(Germany) Dr. Frank Krämer

== Recent managers ==
Logo used 2010–2015

Recent managers of the club:

Manager	Start	Finish
(United States) Brent Goulet	13 April 2004	10 March 2008
(Serbia) Đurađ Vasić	11 March 2008	6 October 2009
(Germany) Günter Erhardt	15 October 2009	26 September 2011
(Germany) Jens Kiefer	27 September 2011	22 August 2013
(Germany) Dietmar Hirsch	2 September 2013	14 April 2014
(Germany) Roland Seitz	14 April 2014	31 May 2014
(Germany) Willi Kronhardt	1 June 2014	7 May 2015
(Germany) Stefan Minkwitz	7 May 2015	30 June 2015
(Germany) Michael Wiesinger	1 July 2015	30 June 2017
(Germany) Karsten Neitzel	1 July 2017	11 March 2018
(Germany) Roland Seitz	11 March 2018	29 October 2018
(Germany) Horst Steffen	1 November 2018	29 May 2025
(Germany) Vincent Wagner	1 July 2025	present

== Honours ==
=== League ===
- 2. Bundesliga
  - Runner-up: 2026
- 3. Liga
  - Champions: 2023
- Regionalliga Südwest (IV)
  - Champions: 2017, 2022
  - Runners-up: 2013, 2016
- Oberliga Südwest (IV)
  - Champions: 1996, 1998
- Verbandsliga Saarland (IV)
  - Champions: 1980, 1994, 2008 (reserve team)

=== Cup ===
- Saarland Cup
  - Winners: 2009, 2010, 2015, 2018, 2020, 2021, 2022, 2023
  - Runners-up: 1979, 1982, 2004, 2014, 2016, 2019

== Recent seasons ==
Logo used 2015–2021

The recent season-by-season performance of the club:

=== SV Elversberg ===
Season	Division	Tier	Position
1999–2000	Regionalliga West/Südwest	III	12th
2000–01	Regionalliga Süd	III	14th
2001–02	Regionalliga Süd	III	11th
2002–03	Regionalliga Süd	III	14th
2003–04	Regionalliga Süd	III	12th
2004–05	Regionalliga Süd	III	10th
2005–06	Regionalliga Süd	III	9th
2006–07	Regionalliga Süd	III	9th
2007–08	Regionalliga Süd	III	15th
2008–09	Regionalliga West	IV	11th
2009–10	Regionalliga West	IV	7th
2010–11	Regionalliga West	IV	12th
2011–12	Regionalliga West	IV	13th
2012–13	Regionalliga Südwest	IV	2nd ↑
2013–14	3. Liga	III	18th ↓
2014–15	Regionalliga Südwest	IV	3rd
2015–16	Regionalliga Südwest	IV	2nd
2016–17	Regionalliga Südwest	IV	1st
2017–18	Regionalliga Südwest	IV	5th
2018–19	Regionalliga Südwest	IV	4th
2019–20	Regionalliga Südwest	IV	3rd
2020–21	Regionalliga Südwest	IV	2nd
2021–22	Regionalliga Südwest	IV	1st ↑
2022–23	3. Liga	III	1st ↑
2023–24	2. Bundesliga	II	11th
2024–25	2. Bundesliga	II	3rd
2025–26	2. Bundesliga	II	2nd ↑
2026–27	Bundesliga	I	

=== SV Elversberg II ===
Season	Division	Tier	Position
2003–04	Kreisliga A Höcherberg	VIII	1st ↑
2004–05	Bezirksliga Ost	VII	2nd
2005–06	Bezirksliga Ost	VII	1st ↑
2006–07	Landesliga Nordost	VI	1st ↑
2007–08	Verbandsliga Saarland	V	1st ↑
2008–09	Oberliga Südwest	V	16th
2009–10	Oberliga Südwest	V	10th
2010–11	Oberliga Südwest	V	9th
2011–12	Oberliga Südwest	V	12th
2012–13	Oberliga Rheinland-Pfalz/Saar	V	15th
2013–14	Oberliga Rheinland-Pfalz/Saar	V	5th
2014–15	Oberliga Rheinland-Pfalz/Saar	V	9th
2015–16	Oberliga Rheinland-Pfalz/Saar	V	16th ↓
2016–17	Saarlandliga	VI	10th
2017–18	Saarlandliga	VI	11th
2018–19	Saarlandliga	VI	1st ↑
2019–20	Oberliga Rheinland-Pfalz/Saar	V	3rd
2020–21	Oberliga Rheinland-Pfalz/Saar (South)	V	6th
2021–22	Oberliga Rheinland-Pfalz/Saar (South Relegation Group)	V	4th
2022–23	Oberliga Rheinland-Pfalz/Saar (South Relegation Group)	V	12th ↓
2023–24	Saarlandliga	VI	15th
2024–25	Saarlandliga	VI	14th
2025–26	Saarlandliga	VI	1st ↑
2026–27	Oberliga Rheinland-Pfalz/Saar	V	

- With the introduction of the Regionalligas in 1994 and the 3. Liga in 2008 as the new third tier, below the 2. Bundesliga, all leagues below dropped one tier.

Key

↑ Promoted	↓ Relegated

== See also ==
- SV Elversberg (women)
