= List of German football transfers winter 2025–26 =

This is a list of German football transfers in the winter transfer window 2025–26 by club. Only transfers of the Bundesliga and 2. Bundesliga are included.

== Bundesliga ==
Note: Flags indicate national team as has been defined under FIFA eligibility rules. Players may hold more than one non-FIFA nationality.

=== Bayern Munich ===
In:

No.	Pos.	Nation	Player

Out:

No.	Pos.	Nation	Player
23	DF	FRA	Sacha Boey (on loan to Galatasaray)
—	GK	ISR	Daniel Peretz (on loan to Southampton, previously on loan at Hamburger SV)
—	FW	ESP	Bryan Zaragoza (on loan to Roma, previously on loan at Celta Vigo)

=== Bayer Leverkusen ===
In:

No.	Pos.	Nation	Player
18	GK	SUI	Jonas Omlin (on loan from Borussia Mönchengladbach)
41	DF	MLI	Issa Traoré (from Djoliba)

Out:

No.	Pos.	Nation	Player
9	MF	ARG	Claudio Echeverri (loan return to Manchester City)
18	FW	ARG	Alejo Sarco (on loan to Borussia Mönchengladbach)
44	DF	FRA	Jeanuël Belocian (on loan to VfL Wolfsburg)
—	FW	UKR	Artem Stepanov (on loan to Utrecht, previously on loan at 1. FC Nürnberg)

=== Eintracht Frankfurt ===
In:

No.	Pos.	Nation	Player
11	FW	GER	Younes Ebnoutalib (from SV Elversberg)
25	FW	FRA	Arnaud Kalimuendo (on loan from Nottingham Forest)
26	DF	JPN	Keita Kosugi (from Djurgården)
29	FW	MAR	Ayoube Amaimouni (from TSG Hoffenheim II)
31	MF	SWE	Love Arrhov (from Brommapojkarna)

Out:

No.	Pos.	Nation	Player
17	FW	CIV	Elye Wahi (on loan to Nice)
24	DF	POR	Aurélio Buta (to Copenhagen)
32	FW	GER	Jessic Ngankam (on loan to Wolfsberg)
47	MF	HUN	Noah Fenyő (on loan to Újpest)

=== Borussia Dortmund ===
In:

No.	Pos.	Nation	Player

Out:

No.	Pos.	Nation	Player
13	MF	GER	Pascal Groß (to Brighton & Hove Albion)
16	FW	BEL	Julien Duranville (on loan to Basel)
28	DF	ARG	Aarón Anselmino (loan return to Chelsea)
37	FW	USA	Cole Campbell (on loan to TSG Hoffenheim)

=== SC Freiburg ===
In:

No.	Pos.	Nation	Player

Out:

No.	Pos.	Nation	Player
18	FW	GER	Eren Dinkçi (on loan to 1. FC Heidenheim)
20	FW	AUT	Junior Adamu (on loan to Celtic)
—	MF	GER	Robert Wagner (on loan to Dynamo Dresden, previously on loan at Holstein Kiel)
—	MF	GER	Noah Weißhaupt (on loan to Hannover 96, previously on loan at Legia Warsaw)

=== Mainz 05 ===
In:

No.	Pos.	Nation	Player
4	DF	AUT	Stefan Posch (on loan from Como)
20	FW	GER	Phillip Tietz (from FC Augsburg)
23	FW	SUR	Sheraldo Becker (on loan from Osasuna)
26	FW	COD	Silas (from VfB Stuttgart)
—	MF	FIN	Otto Ruoppi (from KuPS)

Out:

No.	Pos.	Nation	Player
9	FW	FRA	Arnaud Nordin (on loan to Rennes)
23	DF	AUT	Konstantin Schopp (on loan to TSV Hartberg)
37	FW	GER	Ben Bobzien (on loan to Dynamo Dresden)
—	MF	KOR	Hong Hyun-seok (on loan to Gent, previously on loan at Nantes)
—	MF	FIN	Otto Ruoppi (on loan to KuPS)

=== RB Leipzig ===
In:

No.	Pos.	Nation	Player
10	FW	GER	Brajan Gruda (on loan from Brighton & Hove Albion)
18	FW	NGA	Suleman Sani (from Trenčín)
21	FW	NED	Ayodele Thomas (from Jong PSV)
—	DF	FRA	Abdoul Koné (from Stade Reims)

Out:

No.	Pos.	Nation	Player
8	MF	MLI	Amadou Haidara (to Lens)
36	FW	GER	Timo Werner (to San Jose Earthquakes)
42	DF	BEL	Joyeux Masanka Bungi (on loan to New York Red Bulls)
44	MF	SVN	Kevin Kampl (retired)
—	DF	FRA	Abdoul Koné (on loan to Stade Reims)
—	DF	NOR	Jonathan Norbye (on loan to Fredrikstad, previously on loan at Arminia Bielefeld)
—	FW	GER	Robert Ramsak (on loan to SV Sandhausen, previously on loan at Eintracht Braunschweig)
—	FW	CZE	Yannick Eduardo (to Dordrecht, previously on loan)

=== Werder Bremen ===
In:

No.	Pos.	Nation	Player
19	FW	SRB	Jovan Milošević (on loan from VfB Stuttgart, previously on loan at Partizan)

Out:

No.	Pos.	Nation	Player
21	MF	NOR	Isak Hansen-Aarøen (to NEC)
28	MF	FRA	Skelly Alvero (on loan to Amiens)
—	MF	GUI	Naby Keïta (to Ferencváros, previously on loan)

=== VfB Stuttgart ===
In:

No.	Pos.	Nation	Player
25	FW	ECU	Jeremy Arévalo (from Racing Santander)

Out:

No.	Pos.	Nation	Player
5	MF	GER	Yannik Keitel (on loan to FC Augsburg)
13	FW	COD	Silas (to Mainz 05)
20	DF	SUI	Leonidas Stergiou (on loan to 1. FC Heidenheim)
—	FW	SRB	Jovan Milošević (on loan to Werder Bremen, previously on loan at Partizan)

=== Borussia Mönchengladbach ===
In:

No.	Pos.	Nation	Player
8	FW	ARG	Alejo Sarco (on loan from Bayer Leverkusen)
14	DF	JPN	Kōta Takai (on loan from Tottenham Hotspur)
38	MF	SWE	Hugo Bolin (on loan from Malmö)

Out:

No.	Pos.	Nation	Player
1	GK	SUI	Jonas Omlin (on loan to Bayer Leverkusen)
20	DF	GER	Luca Netz (to Nottingham Forest)
22	MF	DEN	Oscar Fraulo (to Derby County)
28	FW	ARM	Grant-Leon Ranos (on loan to Eintracht Braunschweig)
34	FW	GER	Charles Herrmann (to Cercle Brugge)
—	FW	CZE	Tomáš Čvančara (on loan to Celtic, previously on loan at Antalyaspor)

=== VfL Wolfsburg ===
In:

No.	Pos.	Nation	Player
6	DF	FRA	Jeanuël Belocian (on loan from Bayer Leverkusen)
7	FW	JPN	Kento Shiogai (from NEC)
18	DF	GHA	Jonas Adjetey (from Basel)
26	DF	FRA	Saël Kumbedi (from Lyon, previously on loan)
33	DF	BRA	Cleiton (from Flamengo)

Out:

No.	Pos.	Nation	Player
7	FW	DEN	Andreas Skov Olsen (on loan to Rangers)
22	DF	FRA	Mathys Angely (on loan to Anderlecht)

=== FC Augsburg ===
In:

No.	Pos.	Nation	Player
14	MF	GER	Yannik Keitel (on loan from VfB Stuttgart)
21	FW	POR	Rodrigo Ribeiro (on loan from Sporting CP)
34	DF	BRA	Arthur Chaves (on loan from TSG Hoffenheim)
38	FW	AUT	Michael Gregoritsch (on loan from Brøndby)
39	FW	NGA	Uchenna Ogundu (from Alanyaspor)

Out:

No.	Pos.	Nation	Player
9	FW	COD	Samuel Essende (to Young Boys)
10	MF	GER	Arne Maier (to Újpest)
21	FW	GER	Phillip Tietz (to Mainz 05)
23	DF	GER	Maximilian Bauer (on loan to Arminia Bielefeld)
26	FW	TUN	Elias Saad (on loan to Hannover 96)
28	FW	LUX	Aiman Dardari (on loan to Greuther Fürth)

=== Union Berlin ===
In:

No.	Pos.	Nation	Player

Out:

No.	Pos.	Nation	Player
27	FW	CRO	Marin Ljubičić (on loan to Fortuna Düsseldorf)
41	DF	GER	Oluwaseun Ogbemudia (on loan to Waldhof Mannheim)

=== FC St. Pauli ===
In:

No.	Pos.	Nation	Player
15	DF	JPN	Tomoya Ando (from Avispa Fukuoka)
18	FW	JPN	Taichi Hara (from Kyoto Sanga)
20	MF	NOR	Mathias Rasmussen (from Union Saint-Gilloise)
47	GK	CAN	Emil Gazdov (on loan from CF Montréal, previously on loan at Valour FC)

Out:

No.	Pos.	Nation	Player
17	FW	ENG	Dapo Afolayan (to Blackburn Rovers)
20	MF	SWE	Erik Ahlstrand (on loan to Heracles Almelo)
—	MF	SCO	Scott Banks (on loan to Barnsley, previously on loan at Blackpool)

=== TSG Hoffenheim ===
In:

No.	Pos.	Nation	Player
16	MF	GER	Luis Engelns (from SC Paderborn)
20	FW	USA	Cole Campbell (on loan from Borussia Dortmund)
31	FW	CZE	Yannick Eduardo (from Dordrecht)

Out:

No.	Pos.	Nation	Player
8	MF	GER	Dennis Geiger (on loan to Aberdeen)
17	MF	GER	Umut Tohumcu (on loan to Holstein Kiel)
24	FW	FRA	David Mokwa (to SV Elversberg)
32	FW	GER	Mërgim Berisha (to 1. FC Kaiserslautern)
35	DF	BRA	Arthur Chaves (on loan to FC Augsburg)
40	DF	GER	Hennes Behrens (on loan to 1. FC Heidenheim)
53	FW	NGA	Precious Benjamin (on loan to SCR Altach)
—	DF	HUN	Attila Szalai (on loan to Pogoń Szczecin, previously on loan at Kasımpaşa)
—	DF	GER	Tim Drexler (to Red Bull Salzburg, previously on loan at 1. FC Nürnberg)

=== 1. FC Heidenheim ===
In:

No.	Pos.	Nation	Player
8	FW	GER	Eren Dinkçi (on loan from SC Freiburg)
10	FW	GER	Christian Conteh (from Eintracht Braunschweig)
25	DF	SUI	Leonidas Stergiou (on loan from VfB Stuttgart)
26	DF	GER	Hennes Behrens (on loan from TSG Hoffenheim)

Out:

No.	Pos.	Nation	Player
1	GK	GER	Kevin Müller (on loan to Schalke 04)
27	DF	GER	Thomas Keller (on loan to Dynamo Dresden)

=== 1. FC Köln ===
In:

No.	Pos.	Nation	Player
22	DF	ENG	Jahmai Simpson-Pusey (on loan from Manchester City, previously on loan at Celtic)
27	MF	PER	Felipe Chávez (on loan from Bayern Munich II)

Out:

No.	Pos.	Nation	Player
25	DF	BIH	Jusuf Gazibegović (on loan to Sturm Graz)
48	MF	BIH	Emin Kujović (on loan to Wolfsberg)
49	DF	GER	Neo Telle (to Fortuna Köln)
—	FW	BIH	Imad Rondić (on loan to Preußen Münster, previously on loan at Raków Częstochowa)
—	FW	GER	Chilohem Onuoha (to Estrela da Amadora, previously on loan at SC Verl)

=== Hamburger SV ===
In:

No.	Pos.	Nation	Player
12	GK	NOR	Sander Tangvik (from Rosenborg)
17	DF	COM	Warmed Omari (from Rennes, previously on loan)
19	FW	USA	Damion Downs (on loan from Southampton)
23	MF	DEN	Albert Grønbæk (on loan from Rennes, previously on loan at Genoa)
27	FW	NGA	Philip Otele (on loan from Basel)

Out:

No.	Pos.	Nation	Player
10	MF	SUR	Immanuel Pherai (on loan to SV Elversberg)
13	DF	POR	Guilherme Ramos (to Beijing Guoan)
22	DF	FRA	Aboubaka Soumahoro (on loan to Saint-Étienne)
23	MF	GER	Jonas Meffert (to Holstein Kiel)
26	GK	ISR	Daniel Peretz (loan return to Bayern Munich)
29	FW	KOS	Emir Sahiti (on loan to Maccabi Tel Aviv)
30	DF	SUI	Silvan Hefti (to D.C. United)
—	MF	FIN	Anssi Suhonen (to OB, previously on loan at Öster)

== 2. Bundesliga ==
Note: Flags indicate national team as has been defined under FIFA eligibility rules. Players may hold more than one non-FIFA nationality.

=== Holstein Kiel ===
In:

No.	Pos.	Nation	Player
8	MF	GER	Umut Tohumcu (on loan from TSG Hoffenheim)
18	FW	SVN	Aldin Jakupović (from Bravo)
28	MF	GER	Jonas Meffert (from Hamburger SV)
—	MF	GER	Tayar Tasdelen (from HSC Hannover)

Out:

No.	Pos.	Nation	Player
17	DF	BIH	Mladen Cvjetinović (on loan to Energie Cottbus)
24	MF	NOR	Magnus Knudsen (to AGF)
39	MF	GER	Robert Wagner (loan return to SC Freiburg)
44	MF	GER	Luca Prasse (on loan to FSV Zwickau)
45	FW	GER	Louis Köster (on loan to VfL Bochum II)
—	MF	GER	Tayar Tasdelen (on loan to HSC Hannover)

=== VfL Bochum ===
In:

No.	Pos.	Nation	Player
13	DF	DEN	Oliver Olsen (from Randers)
16	FW	NIR	Callum Marshall (on loan from West Ham United)
18	DF	NOR	Mikkel Rakneberg (from Kristiansund)
31	MF	GER	Marcel Sobottka (free agent)
—	MF	GER	Moritz Göttlicher (from Bayern Munich U19)

Out:

No.	Pos.	Nation	Player
5	DF	GER	Colin Kleine-Bekel (on loan to St. Gallen)
6	MF	MLI	Ibrahima Sissoko (to Nantes)
10	FW	IRL	Michael Obafemi (loan return to Burnley)
14	FW	FRA	Mathis Clairicia (on loan to Alverca)
15	DF	GER	Felix Passlack (to Hibernian)
36	FW	KOS	Lirim Jashari (on loan to MVV Maastricht)

=== SV Elversberg ===
In:

No.	Pos.	Nation	Player
15	FW	GER	Raif Adam (from Hamburger SV II)
22	MF	SUR	Immanuel Pherai (on loan from Hamburger SV)
42	FW	FRA	David Mokwa (from TSG Hoffenheim)

Out:

No.	Pos.	Nation	Player
9	FW	GER	Otto Stange (loan return to Hamburger SV)
11	FW	GER	Jason Ceka (on loan to Dynamo Dresden)
22	FW	GER	Younes Ebnoutalib (to Eintracht Frankfurt)

=== SC Paderborn ===
In:

No.	Pos.	Nation	Player
10	FW	GER	Kennedy Okpala (from Waldhof Mannheim)

Out:

No.	Pos.	Nation	Player
6	MF	GER	Luis Engelns (to TSG Hoffenheim)
18	FW	GER	Marco Wörner (on loan to SC Verl)
49	FW	GER	Joel Vega Zambrano (to Viktoria Köln)

=== 1. FC Magdeburg ===
In:

No.	Pos.	Nation	Player
18	FW	GER	Richmond Tachie (from 1. FC Kaiserslautern)

Out:

No.	Pos.	Nation	Player
3	DF	KOS	Andi Hoti (to Eintracht Braunschweig)
14	MF	TUR	Abu-Bekir El-Zein (to SSV Ulm)
18	FW	GER	Emir Kuhinja (to Beroe Stara Zagora)
39	FW	GUI	Kandet Diawara (to Troyes)
45	FW	JPN	Ado Onaiwu (to Urawa Reds)

=== Fortuna Düsseldorf ===
In:

No.	Pos.	Nation	Player
16	MF	JPN	Satoshi Tanaka (from Sanfrecce Hiroshima)
20	FW	CRO	Marin Ljubičić (on loan from Union Berlin)
27	FW	CUW	Jordi Paulina (from Borussia Dortmund II)
29	MF	GER	Kilian Sauck (from Borussia Mönchengladbach II)

Out:

No.	Pos.	Nation	Player
22	FW	GER	Danny Schmidt (on loan to Rot-Weiss Essen)

=== 1. FC Kaiserslautern ===
In:

No.	Pos.	Nation	Player
14	DF	DEN	Jacob Rasmussen (from Red Bull Salzburg)
16	DF	BUL	Atanas Chernev (on loan from Estrela da Amadora)
17	FW	BEL	Norman Bassette (on loan from Coventry City, previously on loan at Reims)
20	FW	GER	Mërgim Berisha (from TSG Hoffenheim)

Out:

No.	Pos.	Nation	Player
20	MF	GER	Tobias Raschl (to Preußen Münster)
23	MF	NGA	Afeez Aremu (to Aberdeen)
27	FW	NGA	Dickson Abiama (on loan to Rot-Weiss Essen)
29	FW	GER	Richmond Tachie (to 1. FC Magdeburg)
31	DF	SUI	Jan Elvedi (on loan to Greuther Fürth)
48	FW	GER	Faride Alidou (on loan to Eintracht Braunschweig)

=== Karlsruher SC ===
In:

No.	Pos.	Nation	Player
5	DF	GHA	Stephan Ambrosius (on loan from St. Gallen)
8	MF	KOR	Kwon Hyeok-kyu (from Nantes)

Out:

No.	Pos.	Nation	Player

=== Hannover 96 ===
In:

No.	Pos.	Nation	Player
10	MF	GER	Noah Weißhaupt (on loan from SC Freiburg, previously on loan at Legia Warsaw)
21	MF	MWI	Mwisho Mhango (from Ascent Soccer Academy)
23	MF	ISL	Stefán Teitur Þórðarson (from Preston North End)
24	FW	TUN	Elias Saad (on loan from FC Augsburg)

Out:

No.	Pos.	Nation	Player
10	MF	GER	Jannik Rochelt (on loan to Arminia Bielefeld)
32	DF	GER	Jonas Sterner (on loan to Dynamo Dresden)
—	GK	GER	Leon-Oumar Wechsel (on loan to Jahn Regensburg, previously on loan at GKS Tychy)

=== 1. FC Nürnberg ===
In:

No.	Pos.	Nation	Player
20	MF	ESP	Javier Fernández (on loan from Bayern Munich II)
22	MF	FRA	Rabby Nzingoula (on loan from Strasbourg)
44	DF	ARM	Styopa Mkrtchyan (from Osijek)

Out:

No.	Pos.	Nation	Player
9	FW	GER	Semir Telalović (on loan to Arminia Bielefeld)
11	FW	UKR	Artem Stepanov (loan return to Bayer Leverkusen)
15	DF	GER	Tim Drexler (loan return to TSG Hoffenheim)
20	MF	SEN	Pape Demba Diop (loan return to Strasbourg)
22	MF	SLE	Hindolo Mustapha (loan return to Crystal Palace)
31	DF	GER	Robin Knoche (to Arminia Bielefeld)
38	MF	GER	Winners Osawe (on loan to Schweinfurt 05)
44	DF	CZE	Ondřej Karafiát (to Mladá Boleslav)
47	GK	SVK	Michal Kukučka (on loan to Koper)
—	FW	GER	Dustin Forkel (on loan to Schweinfurt 05, previously on loan at Jahn Regensburg)

=== Hertha BSC ===
In:

No.	Pos.	Nation	Player
7	FW	CRO	Josip Brekalo (from Real Oviedo)

Out:

No.	Pos.	Nation	Player
3	DF	URU	Agustín Rogel (to Nacional)
24	FW	ISL	Jón Dagur Þorsteinsson (on loan to Brann)

=== Darmstadt 98 ===
In:

No.	Pos.	Nation	Player
4	DF	USA	Grayson Dettoni (on loan from Bayern Munich II)
18	DF	ITA	Raoul Petretta (from Toronto FC)
31	MF	GER	Niklas Schmidt (on loan from Toulouse)

Out:

No.	Pos.	Nation	Player
3	DF	RUS	Leon Klassen (on loan to Grazer AK)
10	MF	SUR	Jean-Paul Boëtius (free agent)
14	DF	MNE	Meldin Drešković (on loan to Nyíregyháza)
28	MF	GER	Paul Will (on loan to Greuther Fürth)

=== Greuther Fürth ===
In:

No.	Pos.	Nation	Player
11	FW	LUX	Aiman Dardari (on loan from FC Augsburg)
13	MF	GER	Paul Will (on loan from Darmstadt 98)
15	DF	SUI	Jan Elvedi (on loan from 1. FC Kaiserslautern)
28	MF	FIN	Doni Arifi (from KuPS)
45	FW	POR	Keyan Varela (on loan from Servette)
47	MF	TUN	Sayfallah Ltaief (on loan from Twente, previously on loan at Sparta Rotterdam)

Out:

No.	Pos.	Nation	Player
8	MF	LUX	Mathias Olesen (on loan to Grazer AK)
31	GK	GER	Sebastian Jung (on loan to Komárno)
42	FW	GER	Omar Sillah (on loan to Alemannia Aachen)

=== Schalke 04 ===
In:

No.	Pos.	Nation	Player
10	FW	BIH	Edin Džeko (from Fiorentina)
16	DF	SEN	Moussa N'Diaye (on loan from Anderlecht)
21	MF	AUT	Dejan Ljubičić (from Dinamo Zagreb)
22	GK	GER	Kevin Müller (on loan from 1. FC Heidenheim)
24	MF	FRA	Adil Aouchiche (from Sunderland, previously on loan at Aberdeen)

Out:

No.	Pos.	Nation	Player
8	MF	GER	Amin Younes (free agent)
16	MF	URU	Mauro Zalazar (on loan to Braga)
22	DF	SEN	Ibrahima Cissé (to Aarau)
28	GK	GER	Justin Heekeren (to Anderlecht)
—	FW	GER	Jakob Sachse (on loan to Viktoria Köln)

=== Preußen Münster ===
In:

No.	Pos.	Nation	Player
9	FW	JPN	Shin Yamada (on loan from Celtic)
29	FW	BIH	Imad Rondić (on loan from 1. FC Köln, previously on loan at Raków Częstochowa)
32	MF	GER	Tobias Raschl (from 1. FC Kaiserslautern)

Out:

No.	Pos.	Nation	Player
37	FW	MKD	Leon Tasov (on loan to SV Meppen)
39	MF	GER	Jakob Korte (on loan to FC Gütersloh)
44	FW	GER	Marvin Schulz (on loan to SV Sandhausen)

=== Eintracht Braunschweig ===
In:

No.	Pos.	Nation	Player
4	DF	KOS	Andi Hoti (from 1. FC Magdeburg)
10	FW	GER	Faride Alidou (on loan from 1. FC Kaiserslautern)
11	FW	SRB	Jovan Mijatović (on loan from New York City, previously on loan at OH Leuven)
17	FW	GER	Aaron Opoku (from Kayserispor)
18	MF	GER	Anas Bakhat (free agent)
25	FW	ARM	Grant-Leon Ranos (on loan from Borussia Mönchengladbach)
38	FW	GER	Ken Izekor (on loan from Bayer Leverkusen U19)

Out:

No.	Pos.	Nation	Player
2	DF	TUN	Mohamed Dräger (to Espérance de Tunis)
11	FW	HUN	Levente Szabó (to Zagłębie Lubin)
17	FW	GER	Sebastian Polter (to Partizan)
23	FW	GER	Robert Ramsak (loan return to RB Leipzig)
25	DF	GER	Sanoussy Ba (on loan to Waldhof Mannheim)
27	MF	GER	Sven Köhler (to Grasshopper)
32	FW	GER	Christian Conteh (to 1. FC Heidenheim)

=== Arminia Bielefeld ===
In:

No.	Pos.	Nation	Player
5	DF	GER	Maximilian Bauer (on loan from FC Augsburg)
7	FW	GER	Semir Telalović (on loan from 1. FC Nürnberg)
22	MF	GER	Jannik Rochelt (on loan from Hannover 96)
31	DF	GER	Robin Knoche (from 1. FC Nürnberg)

Out:

No.	Pos.	Nation	Player
5	DF	NOR	Jonathan Norbye (loan return to RB Leipzig)
7	FW	GER	Julian Kania (on loan to VfL Osnabrück)
13	MF	GER	Lukas Kunze (on loan to Hansa Rostock)
20	MF	AUT	Florian Micheler (loan return to TSG Hoffenheim)
45	FW	GER	Vincent Ocansey (on loan to Erzgebirge Aue)

=== Dynamo Dresden ===
In:

No.	Pos.	Nation	Player
7	FW	GER	Jason Ceka (on loan from SV Elversberg)
18	MF	GER	Robert Wagner (on loan from SC Freiburg, previously on loan at Holstein Kiel)
20	FW	GER	Ben Bobzien (on loan from Mainz 05)
32	DF	GER	Jonas Sterner (on loan from Hannover 96)
39	DF	GER	Thomas Keller (on loan from 1. FC Heidenheim)
40	GK	GER	Elias Bethke (from Energie Cottbus)

Out:

No.	Pos.	Nation	Player
11	FW	GER	Dominik Kother (on loan to MSV Duisburg)
17	MF	SVN	Aljaž Casar (to MSV Duisburg)
25	MF	GER	Jonas Oehmichen (on loan to Alemannia Aachen)
38	MF	AUT	Jakob Zickler (to Borussia Mönchengladbach II)
—	DF	GER	Dennis Duah (on loan to TSV Havelse, previously on loan at Energie Cottbus)

== See also ==
- 2025–26 Bundesliga
- 2025–26 2. Bundesliga
