= 2026–27 FC Augsburg season =

FC Augsburg
2026–27 season
- Chairman: Klaus Hofmann
- Head coach: Manuel Baum
- Stadium: WWK Arena
- Bundesliga: 10th
- DFB-Pokal: Second round
- Top goalscorer: League: Michael Gregoritsch (7); All: Michael Gregoritsch (7)
- Highest home attendance: 30,660
- Biggest win: 3–0 vs Schalke 04, 30 August 2026; 4–1 vs Eintracht Frankfurt, 6 September 2026
- Biggest defeat: 5-2 vs RB Leipzig, 7 November 2026
Home colours	Away colours	Third colours
- All statistics correct as of 1 September 2026.

The 2026–27 season is the 120th season in the history of FC Augsburg, and the club's 16th consecutive season in the Bundesliga. In addition to the domestic league, the club is participating in the DFB-Pokal.

== Current squad ==
As of 9 September 2026

Note: Flags indicate national team as defined under FIFA eligibility rules; some limited exceptions apply. Players may hold more than one non-FIFA nationality.

No.	Pos.	Nation	Player
1	GK	GER	Finn Dahmen
2	DF	GER	Calvin Brackelmann
4	MF	FRA	Han-Noah Massengo
5	DF	FRA	Chrislain Matsima
6	DF	NED	Jeffrey Gouweleeuw (captain)
7	DF	KOR	Seol Young-woo
8	MF	GER	Sima Suso
9	FW	POR	Rodrigo Ribeiro
10	MF	GER	Mert Kömür
11	FW	AUT	Michael Gregoritsch
14	MF	GER	Yannik Keitel (on loan from Stuttgart)
15	FW	BEN	Steve Mounié
16	DF	GER	Hennes Behrens
18	MF	GER	Tim Breithaupt
19	MF	GER	Robin Fellhauer

No.	Pos.	Nation	Player
20	MF	FRA	Alexis Claude-Maurice
21	MF	GER	Arijon Ibrahimović (on loan from Bayern Munich)
22	GK	CRO	Nediljko Labrović
23	FW	GER	Faik Sakar
27	DF	GER	Marius Wolf
30	MF	GER	Anton Kade
32	MF	SUI	Fabian Rieder
34	FW	COD	Nathanaël Mbuku
35	DF	SLE	Juma Bah (on loan from Manchester City)
37	MF	GER	Tim Schnitzer
39	FW	NGR	Uchenna Ogundu
40	DF	GER	Noahkai Banks
42	MF	TUR	Mahmut Küçükşahin
48	GK	GER	Tom Wisbereit

=== Out on loan ===
Note: Flags indicate national team as defined under FIFA eligibility rules; some limited exceptions apply. Players may hold more than one non-FIFA nationality.

No.	Pos.	Nation	Player
—	GK	POL	Marcel Łubik (at Wisła Kraków until 30 June 2027)
—	MF	CRO	Kristijan Jakić (at PAOK until 30 June 2027)
—	FW	LUX	Aiman Dardari (at Rot-Weiss Essen until 30 June 2027)
—	FW	FRA	Kyliane Dong (at Bolton Wanderers until 30 June 2027)

No.	Pos.	Nation	Player
—	FW	GER	Yusuf Kabadayı (at Rijeka until 30 June 2027)
—	FW	TUN	Elias Saad (at Nashville until 30 June 2027)
—	FW	COD	Nathanaël Mbuku (at Sint-Truiden until 30 June 2027)

== Overall record ==
Competition	First match	Last match	Starting round	Record							
Competition	First match	Last match	Starting round	Pld	W	D	L	GF	GA	GD	Win %
Bundesliga	30 August 2026	22 May 2027	Matchday 1	10	3	3	4	23	21	+2	30.00
DFB-Pokal	22 August 2026		First round	2	2	0	0	6	2	+4	100.00
Total				12	5	3	4	29	23	+6	41.67

Last updated: 22 November 2026
Source: Soccerway

== Bundesliga ==
=== League table ===
Pos	Team	Pld	W	D	L	GF	GA	GD	Pts
8	VfB Stuttgart	10	4	1	5	15	15	0	13
9	SV Elversberg	10	4	1	5	17	19	−2	13
10	FC Augsburg	10	3	3	4	23	21	+2	12
11	TSG Hoffenheim	10	4	0	6	16	18	−2	12
12	Hamburger SV	10	4	0	6	10	24	−14	12

Updated to match(es) played on 22 November 2026. Source: Bundesliga
Rules for classification: 1) Points; 2) Goal difference; 3) Goals scored; 4) Head-to-head aggregate results; 5) Head-to-head away goals scored; 6) Away goals scored; 7) Play-off at neutral site.
(Rules 4–6 only apply after all home-and-away matches have been played between the tied teams. Rule 7 only applies after the completion of the season.)

=== Results summary ===
Overall								Home						Away					
Pld	W	D	L	GF	GA	GD	Pts	W	D	L	GF	GA	GD	W	D	L	GF	GA	GD
10	3	3	4	23	21	+2	12	2	3	1	12	8	+4	1	0	3	11	13	−2

Last updated: 22 November 2026.
Source: kicker.de

=== Results by round ===
Round	1	2	3	4	5	6	7	8	9	10	11	12	13	14	15	16	17	18	19	20	21	22	23	24	25	26	27	28	29	30	31	32	33	34
Ground	H	A	H	A	H	A	H	H	A	H	A	H	A	H	A	H	A	A	H	A	H	A	H	A	A	H	A	H	A	H	A	H	A	H
Result	W	W	D	L	D	L	D	L	L	W																								
Position	3	1	3	4	6	10	9	10	14	10																								
Points	3	6	7	7	8	8	9	9	9	12																								

Updated to match(es) played on 22 November 2026. Source: Bundesliga Fixtures & Results
A = Away; H = Home; W = Win; D = Draw; L = Loss

=== Matches ===
The league fixtures were released on 2 July 2026.

Win Draw Loss Fixtures

30 August 2026 1	Augsburg	3–0	Schalke 04	Augsburg
17:30 CEST (UTC+2)	Gregoritsch 18'; Rieder (yellow card) 22'; Kade 79'; Ribeiro 90+2'	Report	Schallenberg (red card) 62'	Stadium: WWK Arena; Attendance: 30,660; Referee: Sascha Stegemann

6 September 2026 2	Eintracht Frankfurt	1–4	Augsburg	Frankfurt
17:30 CEST (UTC+2)	Burkardt 6'; Kosugi (yellow card) 45'	Report	Banks (yellow card) 36'; Ibrahimović 46'; Fellhauer 47'; Claude-Maurice 65'; Rieder 89'	Stadium: Waldstadion; Attendance: 59,100; Referee: Daniel Schlager

12 September 2026 3	Augsburg	2–2	Bayer Leverkusen	Augsburg
15:30 CEST (UTC+2)	Banks (yellow card) 38'; Gregoritsch 50', 55'	Report	Kofane 18'; Doué (yellow card) 72'; Schick 89'	Stadium: WWK Arena; Attendance: 29,775; Referee: Daniel Siebert

19 September 2026 4	Werder Bremen	3–2	Augsburg	Bremen
15:30 CEST (UTC+2)	Arthur (yellow card) 27'; Grüll (yellow card) 60', (goal) 66'; Füllkrug 86'; Weiser 90+3'	Report	Massing (yellow card) 5'; Fellhauer 18'; Brackelmann 58'; Behrens (yellow card) 77'	Stadium: Weserstadion; Attendance: 39,745; Referee: Bastian Dankert

10 October 2026 5	Augsburg	2–2	Bayern München	Augsburg
15:30 CEST	Fellhauer 1'; Matsima (yellow card) 42'; Ribeiro (yellow card) 43', (goal) 64'; Behrens (yellow card) 62'	Report	Saibari 55'; Brown 80'	Stadium: WWK Arena; Referee: Sven Jablonski

17 October 2026 6	SV Elversberg	4–3	Augsburg	Elversberg
15:30 CEST	Petkov (penalty missed) 4', 4'; Günther 7'; Rohr 28'; Keidel (yellow card) 54'; Pinckert (yellow card) 75'; Kristof (yellow card) 84'; Schmahl 89', (yellow card) 90+6'; Futkeu (penalty missed) 90+8'	Report	Massengo (yellow card) 30'; Ribeiro (yellow card) 30'; Rieder 45+9' (pen.); Matsima (yellow card) 52'; Gregoritsch 76' (pen.); Kömür 90'	Stadium: Ursapharm-Arena; Referee: Florian Exner

24 October 2026 7	Augsburg	1–1	Union Berlin	Augsburg
15:30 CEST	Bah (yellow card) 63' (red card); Massengo 71'	Report	Uduokhai (yellow card) 19' (red card); Haberer (yellow card) 31', (goal) 74'; Querfeld (yellow card) 36'; Gray (yellow card) 77'	Stadium: WWK Arena; Attendance: 30,051; Referee: Robin Braun

31 October 2026 8	Augsburg	1–2	Freiburg	Augsburg
15:30 CET	Gregoritsch 18'	Report	Eggestein (yellow card) 52'; Matanović 65'; Ginter (yellow card) 83'; Irié 85'; Grifo (yellow card) 90+1'	Stadium: WWK Arena; Attendance: 30,660; Referee: Christian Dingert

7 November 2026 9	RB Leipzig	5–2	Augsburg	Leipzig
15:30 CET (UTC+1)	Raum (yellow card) 26', (goal) 45+1'; Banzuzi 33'; Nkunku 35'; Rômulo 60'; Baumgartner 66'	Report	Kade 1'; Gouweleeuw (yellow card) 45'; Fellhauer (yellow card) 72'; Ogundu 90+2'	Stadium: Red Bull Arena; Attendance: 38,292; Referee: Daniel Schlager

22 November 2026 10	Augsburg	3–1	Mainz 05	Augsburg
14:30 CET (UTC+1)	Gregoritsch 19', 48'; Bah 36'; Fellhauer (yellow card) 44'	Report	Amiri (yellow card) 43'; Königsdörffer 51'; Posch (yellow card) 75'; Widmer (yellow card) 76'	Stadium: WWK Arena; Attendance: 29,680; Referee: Martin Petersen

29 November 2026 11	TSG Hoffenheim	v	Augsburg	Sinsheim
		Report		Stadium: PreZero Arena

5 December 2026 12	Augsburg	v	Köln	Augsburg
		Report		Stadium: WWK Arena

12 December 2026 13	Borussia Dortmund	v	Augsburg	Dortmund
		Report		Stadium: Signal Iduna Park

19 December 2026 14	Augsburg	v	SC Paderborn	Augsburg
		Report		Stadium: WWK Arena

9 January 2027 15	VfB Stuttgart	v	Augsburg	Stuttgart
		Report		Stadium: MHPArena

12 January 2027 16	Augsburg	v	Borussia Mönchengladbach	Augsburg
		Report		Stadium: WWK Arena

16 January 2027 17	Hamburger SV	v	Augsburg	Hamburg
		Report		Stadium: Volksparkstadion

23 January 2027 18	Schalke 04	v	Augsburg	Gelsenkirchen
		Report		Stadium: Veltins-Arena

28-30 January 2027 19	Augsburg	v	Eintracht Frankfurt	Augsburg
		Report		Stadium: WWK Arena

4-6 February 2027 20	Bayer Leverkusen	v	Augsburg	Leverkusen
		Report		Stadium: BayArena

11-13 February 2027 21	Augsburg	v	Werder Bremen	Augsburg
		Report		Stadium: WWK Arena

18-20 February 2027 22	Bayern München	v	Augsburg	Munich
		Report		Stadium: Allianz Arena

25-27 February 2027 23	Augsburg	v	Elversberg	Augsburg
		Report		Stadium: WWK Arena

1-3 March 2027 24	Union Berlin	v	Augsburg	Berlin
		Report		Stadium: Stadion An der Alten Försterei

4-6 March 2027 25	Freiburg	v	Augsburg	Freiburg
		Report		Stadium: Europa-Park Stadion

11-13 March 2027 26	Augsburg	v	RB Leipzig	Augsburg
		Report		Stadium: WWK Arena

18-20 March 2027 27	Mainz 05	v	Augsburg	Mainz
		Report		Stadium: Mewa Arena

1-3 April 2027 28	Augsburg	v	TSG Hoffenheim	Augsburg
		Report		Stadium: WWK Arena

8-10 April 2027 29	Köln	v	Augsburg	Cologne
		Report		Stadium: RheinEnergieStadion

15-17 April 2027 30	Augsburg	v	Borussia Dortmund	Augsburg
		Report		Stadium: WWK Arena

22-24 April 2027 31	SC Paderborn	v	Augsburg	Paderborn
		Report		Stadium: Home Deluxe Arena

6-8 May 2027 32	Augsburg	v	VfB Stuttgart	Augsburg
		Report		Stadium: WWK Arena

13-15 May 2027 33	Borussia Mönchengladbach	v	Augsburg	Mönchengladbach
		Report		Stadium: Borussia-Park

22 May 2027 34	Augsburg	v	Hamburger SV	Augsburg
		Report		Stadium: WWK Arena

== DFB-Pokal ==
The first round draw was held on 6 June 2026.

22 August 2026 First round	Energie Cottbus	0–2	Augsburg	Cottbus
13:00 CEST (UTC+2)	K. Manu (yellow card) 30'; M. Hannemann (yellow card) 41'	Report	Kade 49'; Schlotterbeck (yellow card) 51'; Jakić (yellow card) 80' (goal) 90+5'; Ribeiro (yellow card) 90+2'	Stadium: LEAG Energie Stadion; Attendance: 14,388; Referee: Robin Braun

27 October 2026 Second round	Sonnenhof Großaspach	2–4	Augsburg	Aspach
1800	L. Molinari 22'; V. Celiktas 46', (yellow card) 62'; N. Pollex (yellow card) 64'	Report	Ribeiro 13', 21'; Ibrahimović 69', (yellow card) 72'; Kade 74'	Stadium: WIRmachenDRUCK Arena; Attendance: 7,438; Referee: Patrick Schwengers

2 December 2026 Round of 16	VfL_Bochum	v	Augsburg	Bochum
		Report		Stadium: Ruhrstadion

== Appearances and goals ==
As of match played 7 November 2026

Players with no appearances are not included on the list; italics indicate a loaned in player

No.	Pos	Nat	Player	Total		Bundesliga		DFB-Pokal	
No.	Pos	Nat	Player	Apps	Goals	Apps	Goals	Apps	Goals
1	GK	(Germany) GER	Finn Dahmen	11	0	9+0	0	2+0	0
2	DF	(Germany) GER	Calvin Brackelmann	7	1	7+0	1	0+0	0
4	MF	(France) FRA	Han-Noah Massengo	10	1	8+0	1	2+0	0
5	DF	(France) FRA	Chrislain Matsima	11	0	9+0	0	2+0	0
6	DF	(Netherlands) NED	Jeffrey Gouweleeuw	9	0	2+6	0	0+1	0
7	DF	(South Korea) KOR	Youngwoo Seol	6	0	1+4	0	1+0	0
9	FW	(Portugal) POR	Rodrigo Ribeiro	11	4	3+6	2	1+1	2
10	MF	(Germany) GER	Mert Kömür	11	1	1+8	1	1+1	0
11	FW	(Austria) AUT	Michael Gregoritsch	10	5	6+2	5	1+1	0
14	MF	(Germany) GER	Yannik Keitel	7	0	2+3	0	1+1	0
16	MF	(Germany) GER	Hennes Behrens	11	0	9+0	0	2+0	0
17	DM	(Croatia) CRO	Kristijan Jakić	1	1	0+0	0	0+1	1
19	DF	(Germany) GER	Robin Fellhauer	11	3	8+1	3	2+0	0
20	MF	(Germany) GER	Alexis Claude-Maurice	5	0	0+5	0	0+0	0
21	MF	(Germany) GER	Arijon Ibrahimović	8	2	7+0	1	0+1	1
27	MF	(Germany) GER	Marius Wolf	8	0	6+1	0	1+0	0
30	MF	(Germany) GER	Anton Kade	8	4	4+2	2	1+1	2
32	MF	(Switzerland) SUI	Fabian Rieder	11	1	9+0	1	2+0	0
35	MF	(Sierra Leone) SLE	Juma Bah	5	0	3+0	0	2+0	0
37	MF	(Germany) GER	Tim Schnitzer	2	0	0+1	0	0+1	0
39	FW	(Nigeria) NGR	Uchenna Ogundu	4	1	0+3	1	0+1	0
40	DF	(Germany) GER	Noahkai Banks	5	0	4+0	0	1+0	0
Players who featured but departed the club during the season:
31	DF	(Germany) GER	Keven Schlotterbeck	1	0	0+0	0	1+0	0

== Clean sheets ==
Rank	Pos.	Nat.	No.	Player	Bundesliga	DFB-Pokal	Total
1	GK	(Germany)	1	Finn Dahmen	1	1	2
Total					1	1	2

== Disciplinary record ==
As of match played 7 November 2026

Rank	Position	Nation	Number	Name	Bundesliga			DFB-Pokal			Total		
Rank	Position	Nation	Number	Name	Yellow card	(yellow card) (yellow-red card)	Red card	Yellow card	(yellow card) (yellow-red card)	Red card	Yellow card	(yellow card) (yellow-red card)	Red card
1	FW	(Portugal)	9	Rodrigo Ribeiro	2	0	0	1	0	0	3	0	0
2	MF	(France)	4	Han-Noah Massengo	2	0	0	0	0	0	2	0	0
2	DF	(France)	5	Chrislain Matsima	2	0	0	0	0	0	2	0	0
2	MF	(Germany)	16	Hennes Behrens	2	0	0	0	0	0	2	0	0
2	DF	(Germany)	40	Noahkai Banks	2	0	0	0	0	0	2	0	0
6	MF	(Sierra Leone)	35	Juma Bah	0	0	1	0	0	0	0	0	1
6	DF	(Netherlands)	6	Jeffrey Gouweleeuw	1	0	0	0	0	0	1	0	0
6	DF	(Germany)	19	Robin Fellhauer	1	0	0	0	0	0	1	0	0
9	MF	(Croatia)	17	Kristijan Jakić	0	0	0	1	0	0	1	0	0
9	MF	(Germany)	21	Arijon Ibrahimović	0	0	0	1	0	0	1	0	0
9	DF	(Germany)	31	Kevin Schlotterbeck	0	0	0	1	0	0	1	0	0
Total					12	0	1	4	0	0	16	0	1
