= 2025–26 SV Elversberg season =

SV Elversberg
2025–26 season
- Chairman: Dieter-Niklas Grünwald
- Head coach: Vincent Wagner
- Stadium: Waldstadion an der Kaiserlinde
- 2. Bundesliga: 2nd (promoted)
- DFB-Pokal: Second round
- Top goalscorer: League: Lukas Petkov (13); All: Lukas Petkov (13)
- Highest home attendance: 10,000 (v. 1. FC Nürnberg, 2. Bundesliga, 2 August 2025)
- Lowest home attendance: 8,341 (v. Holstein Kiel, 2. Bundesliga, 27 September 2025)
- Average home league attendance: 9,154
- Biggest win: 6–0 v. Greuther Fürth (H); 2. Bundesliga, 19 October 2025
- Biggest defeat: 0–3 v. Hertha BSC (H); 2. Bundesliga, 7 February 2026
Home colours	Away colours	Third colours

The 2025–26 season was the 119th season in the history of Sportvereinigung 07 Elversberg, and the club's third consecutive season in the 2. Bundesliga. In addition to the league, the club also competed in the DFB-Pokal.

On 17 May 2026, after beating Preußen Münster 3–0 at home, Elversberg secured promotion to the Bundesliga for the first time in club history, becoming one of the smallest clubs to ever play in the German top division.

== Squad ==
As of May 2026

Note: Flags indicate national team as defined under FIFA eligibility rules; some limited exceptions apply. Players may hold more than one non-FIFA nationality.

No.	Pos.	Nation	Player
1	GK	GER	Frank Lehmann
2	DF	THA	Nicholas Mickelson
3	DF	FRA	Florian Le Joncour
4	DF	GER	Luis Seifert
6	MF	GUI	Amara Condé
7	MF	GER	Manuel Feil
8	MF	POL	Łukasz Poręba (on loan from Hamburger SV)
10	MF	GER	Bambasé Conté (on loan from TSG Hoffenheim)
14	MF	GER	Jarzinho Malanga (on loan from VfB Stuttgart)
15	MF	GER	Raif Adam
16	FW	GER	Luca Pfeiffer
17	MF	GER	Frederik Schmahl
18	FW	GER	Mohammad Mahmoud
19	DF	GER	Lukas Pinckert (captain)

No.	Pos.	Nation	Player
20	GK	AUT	Nicolas Kristof
21	DF	GER	Lasse Günther
22	MF	SUR	Immanuel Pherai (on loan from Hamburger SV)
23	MF	GER	Carlo Sickinger
24	FW	GER	Luca Schnellbacher
25	MF	BUL	Lukas Petkov
28	GK	GER	Tim Boss
29	MF	GER	Tom Zimmerschied
30	DF	GHA	Jan Gyamerah
31	DF	GER	Maximilian Rohr
32	MF	GER	Daniel Pantschenko
42	FW	FRA	David Mokwa
43	DF	GER	Felix Keidel

== 2. Bundesliga ==
The 2. Bundesliga fixtures were released on 27 June 2025.

Pos	Team	Pld	W	D	L	GF	GA	GD	Pts	Promotion, qualification or relegation
1	Schalke 04 (C, P)	34	21	7	6	50	31	+19	70	Promotion to Bundesliga
2	SV Elversberg (P)	34	18	8	8	64	39	+25	62	Promotion to Bundesliga
3	SC Paderborn (O, P)	34	18	8	8	59	45	+14	62	Qualification for promotion play-offs
4	Hannover 96	34	16	12	6	60	44	+16	60	
5	Darmstadt 98	34	13	13	8	57	45	+12	52	

Source: Bundesliga
Rules for classification: 1) Points; 2) Goal difference; 3) Goals scored; 4) Head-to-head results; 5) Head-to-head away goals scored; 6) Away goals scored; 7) Play-off.
(Rules 4–6 only apply after home and away matches have been played between the tied teams.)
(C) Champions; (O) Play-off winners; (P) Promoted

2 August 2025 1	SV Elversberg	1–0	1. FC Nürnberg	Spiesen-Elversberg
13:00 CEST	Rohr 90'	Report		Stadium: Waldstadion an der Kaiserlinde; Attendance: 10,000; Referee: Eric Weisbach

10 August 2025 2	VfL Bochum	2–0	SV Elversberg	Bochum
13:30 CEST	Sissoko 66'; Holtmann 90+1'	Report		Stadium: Ruhrstadion; Attendance: 24,207; Referee: Lukas Benen

22 August 2025 3	SV Elversberg	2–1	1. FC Kaiserslautern	Spiesen-Elversberg
18:30 CEST	Schnellbacher 43'; Schmahl 90+2'	Report	Tachie 79' (pen.)	Stadium: Waldstadion an der Kaiserlinde; Attendance: 9,307; Referee: Florian Exner

29 August 2025 4	Hertha BSC	0–2	SV Elversberg	Berlin
18:30 CEST		Report	Ebnoutalib 5', 59'	Stadium: Olympiastadion; Attendance: 39,680; Referee: Wolfgang Haslberger

14 September 2025 5	SV Elversberg	2–2	Dynamo Dresden	Spiesen-Elversberg
13:30 CEST	Ebnoutalib 9', 90+2'	Report	Daferner 3'; Lemmer 39'	Stadium: Waldstadion an der Kaiserlinde; Attendance: 9,307; Referee: Marc Philip Eckermann

20 September 2025 6	Eintracht Braunschweig	1–4	SV Elversberg	Braunschweig
13:00 CEST	Yardımcı 20'	Report	Ebnoutalib 12', 79'; Gyamerah 34'; Schmahl 86'	Stadium: Eintracht-Stadion; Attendance: 20,085; Referee: Jarno Wienefeld

27 September 2025 7	SV Elversberg	1–0	Holstein Kiel	Spiesen-Elversberg
13:00 CEST	Stange 90+5' (pen.)	Report		Stadium: Waldstadion an der Kaiserlinde; Attendance: 8,341; Referee: Felix Wagner

5 October 2025 8	1. FC Magdeburg	0–4	SV Elversberg	Magdeburg
13:30 CEST		Report	Conté 23'; Zimmerschied 45'; Stange 74'; Malanga 80'	Stadium: Avnet Arena; Attendance: 21,884; Referee: Richard Hempel

19 October 2025 9	SV Elversberg	6–0	Greuther Fürth	Spiesen-Elversberg
13:30 CEST	Conté 27'; Ebnoutalib 48', 56', 80'; Ceka 85'; Le Joncour 90+5'	Report		Stadium: Waldstadion an der Kaiserlinde; Attendance: 8,483; Referee: Felix Bickel

25 October 2025 10	Arminia Bielefeld	2–0	SV Elversberg	Bielefeld
13:00 CEST	Grodowski 17'; Le Joncour 28' (o.g.)	Report		Stadium: Bielefelder Alm; Attendance: 24,856; Referee: Felix Prigan

31 October 2025 11	SV Elversberg	2–2	Hannover 96	Spiesen-Elversberg
18:30 CET	Petkov 22'; Conté 80'	Report	Le Joncour 43' (o.g.); Ghiță 85'	Stadium: Waldstadion an der Kaiserlinde; Attendance: 9,307; Referee: Timo Gerach

8 November 2025 12	Schalke 04	1–0	SV Elversberg	Gelsenkirchen
13:00 CET	Kuruçay 4'	Report		Stadium: Arena AufSchalke; Attendance: 61,818; Referee: Robin Braun

23 November 2025 13	Karlsruher SC	2–3	SV Elversberg	Karlsruhe
13:30 CET	Šimić 62', 83'	Report	Ebnoutalib 26'; Petkov 66'; Keidel 90+4'	Stadium: Wildparkstadion; Attendance: 31,909; Referee: Robert Kampka

30 November 2025 14	SV Elversberg	0–0	Darmstadt 98	Spiesen-Elversberg
13:30 CET		Report		Stadium: Waldstadion an der Kaiserlinde; Attendance: 9,307; Referee: Benjamin Brand

6 December 2025 15	SC Paderborn	1–2	SV Elversberg	Paderborn
13:00 CET	Michel 52'	Report	Ebnoutalib 32'; Schmahl 76'	Stadium: Home Deluxe Arena; Attendance: 12,729; Referee: Robert Hartmann

14 December 2025 16	SV Elversberg	1–0	Fortuna Düsseldorf	Spiesen-Elversberg
13:30 CET	Stange 79'	Report		Stadium: Waldstadion an der Kaiserlinde; Attendance: 9,307; Referee: Richard Hempel

21 December 2025 17	Preußen Münster	1–1	SV Elversberg	Münster
13:30 CET	Amenyido 90+4'	Report	Ebnoutalib 33' (pen.)	Stadium: Preußenstadion; Attendance: 9,828; Referee: Felix Wagner

17 January 2026 18	1. FC Nürnberg	3–2	SV Elversberg	Nuremberg
13:00 CET	Justvan 56'; Scobel 71', 90+3'	Report	Zimmerschied 39'; Malanga 65'	Stadium: Max-Morlock-Stadion; Attendance: 25,639; Referee: Konrad Oldhafer

25 January 2026 19	SV Elversberg	1–1	VfL Bochum	Spiesen-Elversberg
13:30 CET	Petkov 53'	Report	Pannewig 24'	Stadium: Waldstadion an der Kaiserlinde; Attendance: 9,307; Referee: Robert Kampka

31 January 2026 20	1. FC Kaiserslautern	1–3	SV Elversberg	Kaiserslautern
20:30 CET	Rohr 45+9' (o.g.)	Report	Petkov 45+6' (pen.); Mokwa 55'; Schnellbacher 86'	Stadium: Fritz-Walter-Stadion; Attendance: 49,179; Referee: Deniz Aytekin

7 February 2026 21	SV Elversberg	0–3	Hertha BSC	Spiesen-Elversberg
13:00 CET		Report	Klemens 42'; Schuler 58'; Leistner 78'	Stadium: Waldstadion an der Kaiserlinde; Attendance: 9,291; Referee: Lukas Benen

14 February 2026 22	Dynamo Dresden	1–2	SV Elversberg	Dresden
20:30 CET	Rossipal 12'	Report	Mickelson 58'; Petkov 78'	Stadium: Rudolf-Harbig-Stadion; Attendance: 29,155; Referee: Robin Braun

21 February 2026 23	SV Elversberg	3–1	Eintracht Braunschweig	Spiesen-Elversberg
13:00 CET	Petkov 6', 23'; Mokwa 75'	Report	Opoku 35'	Stadium: Waldstadion an der Kaiserlinde; Attendance: 8,758; Referee: Felix Wagner

28 February 2026 24	Holstein Kiel	1–1	SV Elversberg	Kiel
13:00 CET	Therkelsen 63'	Report	Mokwa 61'	Stadium: Holstein-Stadion; Attendance: 12,086; Referee: Jarno Wienefeld

6 March 2026 25	SV Elversberg	1–0	1. FC Magdeburg	Spiesen-Elversberg
18:30 CET	Poręba 85'	Report		Stadium: Waldstadion an der Kaiserlinde; Attendance: 8,652; Referee: Wolfgang Haslberger

13 March 2026 26	Greuther Fürth	2–0	SV Elversberg	Fürth
18:30 CET	Hrgota 42'; Reich 90+6'	Report		Stadium: Sportpark Ronhof Thomas Sommer; Attendance: 11,076; Referee: Felix Prigan

21 March 2026 27	SV Elversberg	3–1	Arminia Bielefeld	Spiesen-Elversberg
13:00 CET	Petkov 38', 69'; Condé 76'	Report	Lannert 84'	Stadium: Waldstadion an der Kaiserlinde; Attendance: 9,307; Referee: Felix Bickel

5 April 2026 28	Hannover 96	1–1	SV Elversberg	Hanover
13:30 CEST	Rohr 20' (o.g.)	Report	Petkov 56' (pen.)	Stadium: Niedersachsenstadion; Attendance: 38,300; Referee: Robert Kampka

12 April 2026 29	SV Elversberg	1–2	Schalke 04	Spiesen-Elversberg
13:30 CEST	Schnellbacher 4'	Report	El-Faouzi 27'; Sylla 56'	Stadium: Waldstadion an der Kaiserlinde; Attendance: 9,307; Referee: Michael Bacher

17 April 2026 30	SV Elversberg	3–0	Karlsruher SC	Spiesen-Elversberg
18:30 CEST	Pherai 26', 53'; Zimmerschied 62'	Report		Stadium: Waldstadion an der Kaiserlinde; Attendance: 9,307; Referee: Felix Prigan

25 April 2026 31	Darmstadt 98	3–3	SV Elversberg	Darmstadt
20:30 CEST	Pfeiffer 14'; Hornby 15', 51'	Report	Zimmerschied 26'; Rohr 34'; Petkov 45+2'	Stadium: Merck-Stadion am Böllenfalltor; Attendance: 17,810; Referee: Richard Hempel

3 May 2026 32	SV Elversberg	5–1	SC Paderborn	Spiesen-Elversberg
13:30 CEST	Rohr 4'; Mokwa 17'; Petkov 28', 41'; Adam 90+3'	Report	Brackelmann 65'	Stadium: Waldstadion an der Kaiserlinde; Attendance: 9,027; Referee: Benjamin Brand

10 May 2026 33	Fortuna Düsseldorf	3–1	SV Elversberg	Düsseldorf
13:30 CEST	Le Joncour 26' (o.g.); Itten 44', 51'	Report	Oberdorf 90+1' (o.g.)	Stadium: Merkur Spiel-Arena; Attendance: 42,165; Referee: Wolfgang Haslberger

17 May 2026 34	SV Elversberg	3–0	Preußen Münster	Spiesen-Elversberg
15:30 CEST	Conté 10'; Mokwa 14', 66'	Report		Stadium: Waldstadion an der Kaiserlinde; Attendance: 9,307; Referee: Timo Gerach

== DFB-Pokal ==
The first round draw was made on 15 June 2025. The second round draw was made on 31 August 2025.

17 August 2025 First round	SSV Ulm	0–1	SV Elversberg	Ulm
18:00 CEST		Report	Keidel 72'	Stadium: Donaustadion; Attendance: 9,531; Referee: Richard Hempel

28 October 2025 Second round	Hertha BSC	3–0	SV Elversberg	Berlin
18:30 CET	Cuisance 15'; Grønning 59'; Þorsteinsson 90+4' (pen.)	Report		Stadium: Olympiastadion; Attendance: 32,092; Referee: Tom Bauer
