= Heiner Schuhmann =

German footballer (born 1948)

Personal information
- Date of birth: 4 November 1948
- Position: Defender

Youth career
- TSV Schwaben Augsburg

Senior career*
| Years | Team | Apps | (Gls) |
| 1967–1969 | TSV Schwaben Augsburg | | |
| 1969–1971 | FC Augsburg | | |
| 1971–1973 | 1860 Munich | | |
| 1973–1978 | FC Augsburg | | |

Managerial career
- 1978: FC Augsburg
- 1979–1980: FC Augsburg
- 1981: FC Augsburg
- 1986–1988: FC Augsburg
- ????–1995: FC Augsburg (youth)
- 1995–1998: Bayern Munich (youth)
- 1999: FC Augsburg
- * Club domestic league appearances and goals

Heiner Schuhmann (German pronunciation: [ˈhaɪnɐ ˈʃuːman]; born 4 November 1948) is a retired German football player and coach best known for his time at FC Augsburg. He served the club as a player and coach in the first team on five occasions but had his greatest success as a youth coordinator with the club. In the later position he also worked at Bayern Munich.

== Playing career ==
Schuhmann, a product of the youth program of TSV Schwaben Augsburg started his senior career with te later club in 1967 in the tier two Regionalliga Süd, where he played for two seasons. Relegated after the 1968–69 season the football department of Schwaben merged with local rival BC Augsburg to form FC Augsburg.

Schuhmann continued his career with FCA, now in the tier three Bayernliga. In 1971, he left Augsburg to join 1860 MUnich which had just been relegated from the Bundesliga to the Regionalliga. After two seasons at this club he returned to FC Augsburg, now freshly promoted to the Regionalliga. He played in the Regionalliga-championship winning side of 1973–74 alongside German international Helmut Haller. From 1974 Augsburg played in the new 2. Bundesliga South and Schuhmann made 86 appearances for FCA in this league. He ended his playing career in 1978 and took briefly over as FC Augsburg caretaker manager at the end of the 1977–78 season.

== Coaching career ==
FC Augsburg was relegated from the 2. Bundesliga in 1979 and Schuhmann became the coach of the club for the 1979–80 season. He led the side to a championship in the Bayernliga and promotion to the 2. Bundesliga but did not stay on as coach for the following year. He briefly returned to his coaching role in April 1981 when FCA sacked coach Heinz Elzner but was unable to save the club from relegation. He returned however for a fourth spell in charge of FCA in October 1986, now with the club firmly established in third division football, and left again in March 1988, achieving two sixth-place finishes.

Schuhmann was the long term coach of the under 19 side of FC Augsburg, which is where he had his greatest success. He coached the youth side of third division FCA to four German under 19 Cup wins in 1991, 1992, 1994 and 1995. The highlight in this era was however FCA's German under 19 championship win in 1993 against 1. FC Kaiserslautern. In this time he discovered players like Bernd Schuster, Karl-Heinz Riedle, Christian Hochstätter, Armin Veh, Raimond Aumann, Roland Grahammer, Thomas Meggle and Dieter Frey.

He left FC Augsburg in 1995 to take over the youth department of FC Bayern Munich, which he led for three years, is greatest success there being a German under 17 title in 1997. Schuhmann left Bayern in 1998, by his own admission because his position turned out to be a desk top job while he preferred to be directly involved with young players, like he was with FCA and in his profession as a high school teacher. He coached FC Augsburg as caretaker manager one more time in late 1999, his fifth stint in this position. Since 2003 he works as a scout for Borussia Dortmund.

== Personal life ==
Since 2009 his son Christoph works as a scout for Borussia Dortmund.

== Honours ==
=== As player ===
- Regionalliga Süd (II)
  - Champions: 1973–74

=== As coach ===
- Bayernliga (III)
  - Champions: 1979–80
- German Under 19 champions
  - Champions: 1993
  - Runners-up: 1998
- German Under 19 Cup
  - Winners: (4) 1991, 1992, 1994, 1995
- German Under 17 championship
  - Champions: 1997
- Under 19 Fußball-Bayernliga
  - Champions: 1990, 1993
- Under 17 Fußball-Bayernliga
  - Champions: 1997, 1998
  - Runners-up: 1996
