= Jarzinho Malanga =

German footballer (born 2006)

Personal information
- Full name: Jarzinho Ataide Adriano de Nascimento Malanga
- Date of birth: 10 July 2006 (age 20)
- Place of birth: Mannheim, Baden-Württemberg, Germany
- Height: 1.79 m (5 ft 10 in)
- Positions: Winger; attacking midfielder; forward

Team information
- Current team: VfB Stuttgart
- Number: 43

Youth career
- 2014–2017: Phönix Mannheim
- 2017–2018: Waldhof Mannheim
- 2018–2020: TSG Hoffenheim
- 2020–2022: Waldhof Mannheim
- 2022–2024: VfB Stuttgart

Senior career*
Years	Team	Apps	(Gls)
2024–	VfB Stuttgart II	40	(4)
2024–	VfB Stuttgart	1	(0)
2025–2026	→ SV Elversberg (loan)	23	(2)

International career^{‡}
2022–2023	Germany U17	14	(0)
2023–2024	Germany U18	5	(0)
2024–2025	Germany U19	11	(0)
2026–	Germany U20	2	(0)
Medal record
Representing Germany
UEFA European Under-17 Championship
Winner	2023
- * Club domestic league appearances and goals as of 8 November 2026 ‡ National team caps and goals as of 16 November 2026

Jarzinho Ataide Adriano de Nascimento Malanga (born 10 July 2006) is a German professional footballer who plays as a winger, attacking midfielder and forward for Bundesliga club VfB Stuttgart.

== Early life ==
Malanga's mother was born in Senegal to a Senegalese-Malian father and German mother. Malanga's father was born in Brazil and is of Angolan descent. His parents moved to Germany, and met in 1992, after which they had 3 children.

== Club career ==
Malanga is a youth product of Phönix Mannheim, Waldhof Mannheim and TSG Hoffenheim, before moving to the youth academy of VfB Stuttgart in 2022. On 8 May 2024, he signed a professional contract with Stuttgart. He was promoted to Stuttgart's reserves in the 3. Liga for the 2024–25 season. He made his senior and professional debut with the senior Stuttgart side as a substitute in a 2–0 UEFA Champions League loss to Atalanta BC on 6 November 2024.

On 2 July 2025, Malanga was loaned to SV Elversberg.

== International career ==
Malanga is a youth international for Germany, having played for the Germany U17s that won the 2023 UEFA European Under-17 Championship.

== Career statistics ==
As of match played 3 May 2026

Appearances and goals by club, season and competition
Club	Season	League			DFB-Pokal		Europe		Total	
Club	Season	Division	Apps	Goals	Apps	Goals	Apps	Goals	Apps	Goals
VfB Stuttgart II	2024–25	3. Liga	12	2	—		—		12	2
VfB Stuttgart	2024–25	Bundesliga	1	0	1	0	3 (Note: Appearances in UEFA Champions League)	0	5	0
SV Elversberg (loan)	2025–26	2. Bundesliga	23	2	1	0	—		24	2
Career total			36	3	2	0	3	0	41	4

== Honours ==
Germany U17

- UEFA European Under-17 Championship: 2023
