= FC Augsburg–TSV 1860 Munich rivalry =

Association football rivalry

- Location: Bavaria
- Teams: 1860 Munich; Augsburg
- First meeting: 1860 Munich 2–1 BC Augsburg (4 November 1945); 1945–46 Oberliga Süd
- Latest meeting: 1860 Munich 0–2 Augsburg (18 February 2011); 2010–11 2. Bundesliga
- Stadiums: Grünwalder Stadion (1860 Munich); WWK Arena (Augsburg)

Statistics
- Total meetings: 45
- Most wins: 1860 Munich (24)
- All-time record: 1860 Munich: 24; Drawn: 7 Augsburg: 14
- Largest victory: 1860 Munich 7–1 Augsburg (2 November 1958); 1958–59 Oberliga

The FC Augsburg–TSV 1860 Munich rivalry is an association football rivalry in Bavaria, Germany, between FC Augsburg and TSV 1860 Munich. The game, while not considered one of the great Bavarian football derbies, unlike the Franconian, Bavarian or Munich derby, nevertheless attracts large crowds. The main reason for the rivalry is the close proximity between the two clubs, Augsburg and Munich are only 64 km apart. The games between the two teams usually attract large crowds, especially considering that the two sides never met in the German top division, the Fußball-Bundesliga, with a large number of away fans traveling to the games.

While in the second division, the two clubs set an all-time spectator record for the Olympic Stadium in Munich, when more than 80,000 saw the first-ever league encounter between the two sides in 1973.

== History ==
While TSV 1860 München frequently played against the two top sides in Augsburg, the TSV Schwaben and the BC Augsburg during their common time in the post-Second World War Oberliga Süd, the rivalry between the Munich and an Augsburg club only truly took off in August 1973. FC Augsburg had been formed in a merger of Schwaben and BCA in 1969 but took until 1973 to earn promotion to professional football. 1860, in turn, was a founding member of the Bundesliga but had been relegated from this league in 1970. In 1973, the two sides met for the first time in a league match in the second division Regionalliga Süd.

On 15 August 1973, in the second round of the league season, FCA traveled to Munich, alongside 25,000 Augsburg fans who caused a 40 km traffic jam on the Augsburg-Munich motorway. The amount of interest took the officials by surprise; only 8,000 tickets had been sold in advance for the game and, at best, 50,000 spectators were expected, but at kick-off 60,000 filled the stadium already - the official capacity was 73,000 spectators; and all the 73,000 tickets were sold out. Yet a large number of spectators was locked outside the gates, unable to obtain a ticket. When 1860 scored in the third minute, it led to an almost-disaster, as the fans outside broke through the gates and climbed over the fences. The correct number in the stadium that night is not known but estimated to be between 80,000 and 100,000, an all-time record for the Olympic Stadium in Munich. It was later seen as a miracle that nobody was killed but the events did lead to 137 injured people. The game is thought to have had the greatest attendance of any second division football match in the world to this date.

After the first game of the two, spectator figures somewhat normalised. In the years to come in the second division, FCA played as a lower table side while 1860 played for promotion. Consequently, the number of spectators for the encounters of the two declined, to a low of 8,000 in 1976. More commonly, the games attracted around 20,000. Briefly, the ways of the two clubs parted when 1860 returned to the Bundesliga while FCA was relegated to the third division Bayernliga. The last encounter of the two in professional football for almost 20 years came in April 1979.

After TSV 1860 was forcibly relegated to the third division for financial reasons in 1982, the two sides met at that level from 1983 onwards for the next eight seasons with, at times, still heated encounters, depending on the ambition and success of the two sides. 1860 returned to professional football in 1991, for just a season, played in the Bayernliga once more in 1992-93 and then finally made a permanent return to professional football. FCA stayed behind and the two sides would not meet again in a league match for 13 years.

In this era, FCA had to contend itself with encounters with its rivals reserve side, TSV 1860 München II, with the two teams meeting in the Bayernliga and Regionalliga, but with spectator figures ranging between a couple of hundred to a few thousand rather than tenthousands.

In 2006, Augsburg returned to same league as 1860, the 2nd Bundesliga, and the rivalry was renewed. Memories of 1973 were revoked when FCA traveled to Munich in March 2007 and the game attracted 69,000. Since then, crowds have declined to an average 30,000, still healthy for the second division. With FCA's promotion to the Bundesliga in 2011, the two sides once more parted ways. With the TSV 1860 in financial trouble since 2006 and coming close to insolvency in 2011, a meeting of the two clubs and top level seemed unlikely. Financial rescue for the club in the form of Jordanian investor Hasan Abdullah Ismaik however has seen the club saved and ambitions raised once more.

The 2011–12 season marked only the second time that FCA played in a league above 1860, the other time having been 1982–83, when FCA played in the 2nd Bundesliga and 1860 in the Bayernliga. Since then Augsburg has played in the Bundesliga while 1860 competed in the level below, with no games between the two rivals taking place or being scheduled.

== Stadiums ==
Originally, games between the two sides were played at the Rosenaustadion, Augsburg and the Olympic Stadium in Munich, with neither side now using those stadiums as their home ground. FCA moved into the Impuls Arena in 2009, with the stadium used for the first time against rivals 1860 in May 2010. TSV 1860 played its home games in the Grünwalder Stadion during the Bayernliga years, the Olympic Stadium being too large for the small third division crowds, and when the two teams finally met in professional football again, 1860 had moved to the new Allianz Arena.

== Games ==
The games between the two sides in league and cup competitions:

=== Statistics ===
Competition	Played	BC Augsburg wins	Draws	TSV 1860 München wins	BC Augsburg goals	TSV 1860 München goals
Oberliga Süd	22	4	4	14	30	62
Total	22	4	4	14	30	62
Competition	Played	FC Augsburg wins	Draws	TSV 1860 München wins	FC Augsburg goals	TSV 1860 München goals
2. Bundesliga	10	7	0	3	19	9
2. Bundesliga Süd	8	0	2	6	8	21
Regionalliga Süd	2	1	1	0	3	1
DFB-Pokal	3	2	0	1	7	5
Total	23	10	3	10	37	36
Overall total	45	14	7	24	67	98

=== List of matches ===
League

#	Season	Date	Competition	Home Team	Result	Away Team	Stadium	Attendance	H2H
BC Augsburg vs TSV 1860 München
1	1945–46	4 November 1945	Oberliga Süd	1860 München	2–1	BC Augsburg	Grünwalder Stadion	–	+1
2	1945–46	3 March 1946	Oberliga Süd	BC Augsburg	2–0	1860 München	Sportplatz Schießstätte	–	0
3	1946–47	5 January 1947	Oberliga Süd	BC Augsburg	1–5	1860 München	Sportplatz Schießstätte	–	+1
4	1946–47	8 June 1947	Oberliga Süd	1860 München	4–1	BC Augsburg	Grünwalder Stadion	–	+2
5	1948–49	3 October 1948	Oberliga Süd	1860 München	2–1	BC Augsburg	Grünwalder Stadion	–	+3
6	1948–49	13 February 1949	Oberliga Süd	BC Augsburg	1–4	1860 München	Sportplatz Schießstätte	–	+4
7	1949–50	18 December 1949	Oberliga Süd	1860 München	1–0	BC Augsburg	Grünwalder Stadion	–	+5
8	1949–50	30 April 1950	Oberliga Süd	BC Augsburg	1–2	1860 München	Paul-Renz-Sportanlage	10,000	+6
9	1950–51	22 October 1950	Oberliga Süd	BC Augsburg	1–5	1860 München	Paul-Renz-Sportanlage	12,000	+7
10	1950–51	24 February 1951	Oberliga Süd	1860 München	6–2	BC Augsburg	Grünwalder Stadion	9,000	+8
11	1952–53	19 October 1952	Oberliga Süd	BC Augsburg	3–0	1860 München	Rosenaustadion	8,000	+7
12	1952–53	22 February 1953	Oberliga Süd	1860 München	1–2	BC Augsburg	Grünwalder Stadion	20,000	+6
13	1955–56	19 October 1952	Oberliga Süd	BC Augsburg	2–2	1860 München	Rosenaustadion	8,000	+6
14	1955–56	22 February 1953	Oberliga Süd	1860 München	4–1	BC Augsburg	Grünwalder Stadion	20,000	+7
15	1957–58	18 August 1957	Oberliga Süd	BC Augsburg	0–1	1860 München	Rosenaustadion	13,000	+8
16	1957–58	8 December 1957	Oberliga Süd	1860 München	2–2	BC Augsburg	Grünwalder Stadion	10,000	+8
17	1958–59	2 November 1958	Oberliga Süd	1860 München	7–1	BC Augsburg	Grünwalder Stadion	24,000	+9
18	1958–59	22 March 1959	Oberliga Süd	BC Augsburg	2–0	1860 München	Rosenaustadion	7,500	+8
19	1961–62	1 October 1961	Oberliga Süd	1860 München	6–2	BC Augsburg	Grünwalder Stadion	20,000	+9
20	1961–62	18 February 1962	Oberliga Süd	BC Augsburg	2–2	1860 München	Rosenaustadion	4,000	+9
21	1962–63	25 August 1962	Oberliga Süd	1860 München	5–1	BC Augsburg	Grünwalder Stadion	18,000	+10
22	1962–63	6 January 1963	Oberliga Süd	BC Augsburg	1–1	1860 München	Rosenaustadion	10,000	+10
FC Augsburg vs TSV 1860 München
1	1973–74	15 August 1973	Regionalliga Süd	1860 München	1–1	FC Augsburg	Olympiastadion	80,000+	0
2	1973–74	12 January 1974	Regionalliga Süd	FC Augsburg	2–0	1860 München	Rosenaustadion	–	+1
3	1974–75	10 August 1974	2. Bundesliga Süd	1860 München	1–1	FC Augsburg	Olympiastadion	50,000	+1
4	1974–75	25 January 1975	2. Bundesliga Süd	FC Augsburg	2–3	1860 München	Rosenaustadion	36,000	0
5	1975–76	12 October 1975	2. Bundesliga Süd	1860 München	4–2	FC Augsburg	Olympiastadion	8,000	+1
6	1975–76	9 April 1976	2. Bundesliga Süd	FC Augsburg	1–1	1860 München	Rosenaustadion	20,000	+1
7	1976–77	23 October 1976	2. Bundesliga Süd	1860 München	3–0	FC Augsburg	Olympiastadion	20,000	+2
8	1976–77	26 March 1977	2. Bundesliga Süd	FC Augsburg	1–3	1860 München	Rosenaustadion	28,000	+3
9	1978–79	12 August 1978	2. Bundesliga Süd	1860 München	4–0	FC Augsburg	Olympiastadion	18,000	+4
10	1978–79	28 April 1979	2. Bundesliga Süd	FC Augsburg	1–2	1860 München	Rosenaustadion	15,000	+5
11	2006–07	27 October 2006	2. Bundesliga	FC Augsburg	3–0	1860 München	Rosenaustadion	28,000	+4
12	2006–07	16 March 2007	2. Bundesliga	1860 München	0–3	FC Augsburg	Allianz Arena	69,000	+3
13	2007–08	12 August 2007	2. Bundesliga	FC Augsburg	2–6	1860 München	Rosenaustadion	28,000	+4
14	2007–08	3 February 2008	2. Bundesliga	1860 München	0–3	FC Augsburg	Allianz Arena	57,400	+3
15	2008–09	14 November 2008	2. Bundesliga	1860 München	0–1	FC Augsburg	Allianz Arena	40,600	+2
16	2008–09	1 May 2009	2. Bundesliga	FC Augsburg	3–0	1860 München	Rosenaustadion	28,000	+1
17	2009–10	12 December 2009	2. Bundesliga	1860 München	1–0	FC Augsburg	Allianz Arena	37,100	+2
18	2009–10	2 May 2010	2. Bundesliga	FC Augsburg	1–0	1860 München	Augsburg Arena	30,660	+1
19	2010–11	26 September 2010	2. Bundesliga	FC Augsburg	1–2	1860 München	Augsburg Arena	30,660	+2
20	2010–11	18 February 2011	2. Bundesliga	1860 München	0–2	FC Augsburg	Allianz Arena	29,200	+1

Cup

#	Season	Date	Competition	Home Team	Result	Away Team	Stadium	Attendance	Round
1	1976–77	18 December 1976	DFB-Pokal	FC Augsburg	2–1	TSV 1860 München	Rosenaustadion	25,000	Third round
2	1977–78	25 October 1977	DFB-Pokal	TSV 1860 München	3–0	FC Augsburg	Grünwalder Stadion	6,480	Third round
3	1986–87	30 August 1986	DFB-Pokal	TSV 1860 München	1–5	FC Augsburg	Grünwalder Stadion	6,000	First round (Note: After extra-time.)

== Records ==
=== All-time top goalscorers ===
Rank	Nation	Player	Club(s)	Years	League	DFB-Pokal	Overall
1	(Germany)	Rudolf Brunnenmeier	TSV 1860 München	1960–1968	6 (Note: Goals in Oberliga Süd against BC Augsburg.)	0	6
2	(Germany)	Michael Thurk	FC Augsburg	2008–2011	5	0	5
3	(Germany)	Alfred Herberth	TSV 1860 München	1974–1981	3	0	3
3	(Germany)	Alfred Kohlhäufl	TSV 1860 München	1974–1979	3	0	3
3	(Germany)	Antonio Di Salvo	TSV 1860 München	2006–2009	3	0	3
3	(Germany)	Ferdinand Keller	TSV 1860 München	1969–1970, 1972–1976	3	0	3
3	(Germany)	Fritz Sommer	TSV 1860 München	1945–1958	3	0	3
3	(Germany)	Hans Auernhammer	TSV 1860 München	1955–1964	3 (Note: Goals in Oberliga Süd against BC Augsburg.)	0	3
3	(Germany)	Hans Haunstein	TSV 1860 München	1975–1979	3	0	3
3	(Germany)	Kurt Lauxmann	TSV 1860 München	1950–1954	3	0	3
3	(Germany)	Manfred Fallisch	TSV 1860 München	1959–1962	3	0	3
3	(Germany)	Otmar Maurus	BC Augsburg	1958–1964	3 (Note: Goals in Oberliga Süd.)	0	3

=== All-time most appearances ===
Rank	Nation	Player	Club(s)	Years	League	DFB-Pokal	Overall
1	(Germany)	Alfons Stemmer	TSV 1860 München	1955–1964	10 (Note: Appearances in Oberliga Süd against BC Augsburg.)	0	10
1	(Germany)	Gerhard Niklasch	BC Augsburg	1948–1959	10 (Note: Appearances in Oberliga Süd.)	0	10
3	(Germany)	Alfred Kohlhäufl	TSV 1860 München	1965–1966, 1974–1979	8	1	9
3	(Germany)	Hans Auernhammer	TSV 1860 München	1955–1964	9 (Note: Appearances in Oberliga Süd.)	0	9
3	(Germany)	Helmut Haller	BC Augsburg	1957–1962	5 (Note: Appearances for BC Augsburg in Oberliga Süd.)	0	9
3	(Germany)	Helmut Haller	FC Augsburg	1973–1976, 1977–1979	4	0	9
3	(Germany)	Georg Metzger	TSV 1860 München	1970–1980	7	2	9
6	(Germany)	Wolfgang Haug	FC Augsburg	1973–1978	6	2	8
6	(Germany)	Bernhard Hartmann	TSV 1860 München	1974–1979	7	1	8

=== Hattricks ===
Player	For	Against	Result	Date	Competition
(Germany) Manfred Fallisch	TSV 1860 München	BC Augsburg	6–2 (H)	1 October 1961	1961–62 Oberliga Süd
(Germany) Rudolf Brunnenmeier^{4}	TSV 1860 München	BC Augsburg	5–1 (H)	25 August 1962	1962–63 Oberliga Süd
(Germany) Antonio Di Salvo	TSV 1860 München	FC Augsburg	6–2 (A)	12 August 2007	2007–08 2. Bundesliga

Note ^{4}: Player scored four goals.
