= Felix Keidel =

German footballer (born 2003)

Personal information
- Date of birth: 14 June 2003 (age 23)
- Place of birth: Duisburg, Germany
- Height: 1.78 m (5 ft 10 in)
- Positions: Right-back; defensive midfielder

Team information
- Current team: SV Elversberg
- Number: 43

Youth career
- –2022: FC Ingolstadt

Senior career*
Years	Team	Apps	(Gls)
2022	FC Ingolstadt II	21	(5)
2022–2025	FC Ingolstadt	82	(2)
2025–	SV Elversberg	32	(3)
- * Club domestic league appearances and goals as of 22:30, 30 October 2026 (UTC)

Felix Keidel (born 14 June 2003) is a German professional footballer who plays as a right-back or defensive midfielder for Bundesliga club SV Elversberg.

== Club career ==
=== FC Ingolstadt ===
Keidel joined FC Ingolstadt as a 9-year-old.

At the age of 21, he was an established player at the club, having made 66 appearances in competitive matches until November 2024. Head coach Sabrina Wittmann, who had already coached him at under-14 level, used him at left-back, while his preferred position was midfield.

In the 2024–25 season Keidel made 35 appearances for Ingolstadt in the 3. Liga, contributing six assists, while Ingolstadt finished the season in tenth place.

=== SV Elversberg ===
Keidel left FC Ingolstadt in June 2025, after two-and-a-half years of playing professionally at the club, to join SV Elversberg. Elversberg had missed out on promotion to the Bundesliga in the relegation play-offs the previous season. Keidel signed a contract until 2028 with Elversberg.

By October 2025 Keidel had made eight appearances, starting in four matches and making one assist. He was deployed as a full-back by head coach Vincent Wagner, twice at right-back and six times at left-back. He finished the season with 25 appearances, playing as a full-back, and starting in 13 matches.

At the beginning of the 2026–27 season, Keidel became a regular starter in defensive midfield, partnering Łukasz Poręba.

== International career ==
In September 2026, Keidel was one of players who were called up with the Germany national team by head coach Jürgen Klopp for the 2026–27 UEFA Nations League matches against Netherlands, Greece, Serbia and Greece between 24 September and 4 October 2026.

== Personal life ==
He is the son of coach and former player Ralf Keidel.

== Career statistics ==
As of match played 30 October 2026

Appearances and goals by club, season and competition
Club	Season	League			DFB-Pokal		Total	
Club	Season	Division	Apps	Goals	Apps	Goals	Apps	Goals
FC Ingolstadt II	2021–22	Bayernliga Süd	1	0	0	0	1	0
FC Ingolstadt II	2022–23	Bayernliga Süd	20	5	0	0	20	5
FC Ingolstadt II	Total		21	5	0	0	21	5
FC Ingolstadt	2022–23	3. Liga	14	0	0	0	14	0
FC Ingolstadt	2023–24	3. Liga	33	1	0	0	33	1
FC Ingolstadt	2024–25	3. Liga	35	1	0	0	35	1
FC Ingolstadt	Total		82	2	0	0	82	2
SV Elversberg	2025–26	2. Bundesliga	25	1	2	1	27	2
SV Elversberg	2026–27	Bundesliga	7	2	2	0	9	2
SV Elversberg	Total		32	3	4	1	36	4
Career total			135	10	4	1	139	11

== Honour ==
SV Elversberg

- 2. Bundesliga: 2025–26 runner-up
