= Juma Bah =

Sierra Leonean footballer (born 2006)

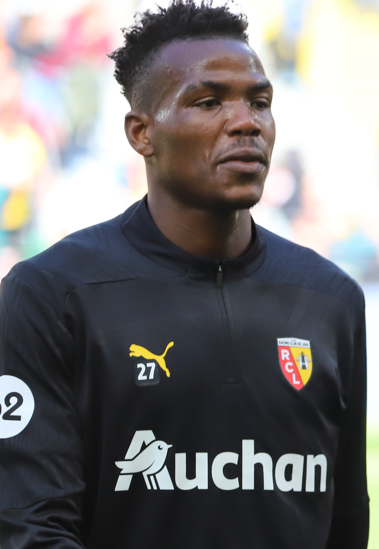
- Bah with Lens in 2025

Personal information
- Full name: Abdulai Juma Bah
- Date of birth: 11 April 2006 (age 20)
- Place of birth: Freetown, Sierra Leone
- Height: 1.95 m (6 ft 5 in)
- Position: Centre-back

Team information
- Current team: FC Augsburg (on loan from Manchester City)
- Number: 35

Youth career
- Freetown Giant Academy

Senior career*
| Years | Team | Apps | (Gls) |
| 2021–2025 | AIK Freetong | | |
| 2022–2024 | → Freetonians SLIFA (loan) | | |
| 2024 | → Valladolid B (loan) | 1 | (0) |
| 2024 | → Valladolid (loan) | 10 | (0) |
| 2025 | Valladolid | 2 | (0) |
| 2025– | Manchester City | 0 | (0) |
| 2025 | → Lens (loan) | 10 | (0) |
| 2025–2026 | → Nice (loan) | 26 | (0) |
| 2026– | → FC Augsburg (loan) | 3 | (0) |

International career^{‡}
| 2025– | Sierra Leone | 9 | (1) |
- * Club domestic league appearances and goals as of 17:30, 24 October 2026 (UTC) ‡ National team caps and goals as of 21:24, 28 September 2026 (UTC)

Abdulai Juma Bah (born 11 April 2006) is a Sierra Leonean professional footballer who plays as a centre-back for Bundesliga club Augsburg, on loan from Premier League club Manchester City, and the Sierra Leone national team.

== Early life ==
Born in Freetown, Bah helped his parents in their bakery during his youth while playing in the streets. Spotted by agent Chernor Musa Jalloh while playing for Freetown Giant Academy, he was signed by AIK Freetong in April 2021.

== Club career ==
=== Early career ===
In 2022, Bah was loaned to Sierra Leone National Premier League side Freetonians SLIFA, spending two years playing for the club and captaining the side during the 2023–24 season.

=== Valladolid ===
On 26 August 2024, after being spotted by Real Valladolid scout Pachu Martínez, Bah joined the club on a one-year loan deal, being initially assigned to the reserves in Segunda Federación. After playing one match with the B-side, he made his first team – and La Liga – debut on 21 September 2024, starting in a 0–0 home draw against Real Sociedad; he also became the first Sierra Leonean to play in the Spanish top tier in the process. He subsequently became a regular unit in the main squad, no longer training with the B's.

On 21 January 2025, Bah and his agent announced that he would leave Valladolid by paying his release clause, to move to Manchester City. The following day, after the player did not show up to training, Valladolid released a statement accusing Bah of "failure to comply with his contractual commitments" to the club while likewise claiming that Bah had paid his own release clause with the "support and guidance" of both his agent and Manchester City. In that same statement, Valladolid also announced that they had exercised Bah's buyout clause on 1 January, with him "starting to belong to the club under a new contract of longer duration and better conditions".

=== Manchester City ===
==== Loans to Lens and Nice ====
On 27 January 2025, Manchester City confirmed that Bah was registered as a player for the club and announced that he would be sent on loan to Ligue 1 club Lens in France. Later that year, on 25 June, he joined fellow Ligue 1 club Nice on loan for the 2025–26 season.

==== Loan to FC Augsburg ====
For the 2026–27 season, Bah was loaned to German Bundesliga club FC Augsburg with an option to buy.

== International career ==
On 28 May 2024, Bah was called up to the Sierra Leone national team for the 2026 FIFA World Cup qualification matches against Djibouti and Burkina Faso.

== Career statistics ==
=== Club ===
As of match played 27 October 2026

Appearances and goals by club, season and competition
| Club | Season | League | | | National cup | | League cup | | Europe | | Other | | Total | |
| Club | Season | Division | Apps | Goals | Apps | Goals | Apps | Goals | Apps | Goals | Apps | Goals | Apps | Goals |
|---|---|---|---|---|---|---|---|---|---|---|---|---|---|---|
| AIK Freetong | 2024–25 | — | | | — | | — | | — | | — | | 0 | 0 |
| Valladolid B (loan) | 2024–25 | Segunda Federación | 1 | 0 | — | | — | | — | | — | | 1 | 0 |
| Valladolid (loan) | 2024–25 | La Liga | 10 | 0 | 1 | 0 | — | | — | | — | | 11 | 0 |
| Valladolid | 2024–25 | La Liga | 2 | 0 | 0 | 0 | — | | — | | — | | 2 | 0 |
| Manchester City | 2024–25 | Premier League | 0 | 0 | 0 | 0 | — | | 0 | 0 | — | | 0 | 0 |
| Lens (loan) | 2024–25 | Ligue 1 | 10 | 0 | — | | — | | — | | — | | 10 | 0 |
| Nice (loan) | 2025–26 | Ligue 1 | 26 | 0 | 5 | 0 | — | | 8 (Note: Two appearances in UEFA Champions League, six appearances in UEFA Europa League) | 0 | 2 (Note: Appearances in Ligue 1 relegation/promotion play-offs) | 0 | 41 | 0 |
| FC Augsburg (loan) | 2026–27 | Bundesliga | 3 | 0 | 1 | 0 | — | | 0 | 0 | — | | 4 | 0 |
| Career total | | | 51 | 0 | 7 | 0 | 0 | 0 | 8 | 0 | 2 | 0 | 68 | 0 |

=== International ===
As of match played 28 September 2026

Appearances and goals by national team and year
| National team | Year | Apps | Goals |
|---|---|---|---|
| Sierra Leone | 2025 | 6 | 1 |
| Sierra Leone | 2026 | 3 | 0 |
| Total | | 9 | 1 |

== Honours ==
Nice

- Coupe de France runner-up: 2025–26
