= Manuel Baum =

German former footballer

Personal information
- Date of birth: 30 August 1979 (age 47)
- Place of birth: Landshut, West Germany
- Height: 1.72 m (5 ft 8 in)
- Position: Goalkeeper

Team information
- Current team: FC Augsburg

Youth career
- –1985: FC Dingolfing
- 1985–1998: 1860 Munich

Senior career*
Years	Team	Apps	(Gls)
1998–2006	FC Ismaning		
2006–2008	FC Unterföhring		

Managerial career
- 2006–2009: FC Unterföhring
- 2009–2011: FT Starnberg 09
- 2014: SpVgg Unterhaching
- 2015: FC Augsburg II
- 2016–2019: FC Augsburg
- 2019–2020: Germany U20
- 2020: Germany U18
- 2020: Schalke 04
- 2025–: FC Augsburg
- * Club domestic league appearances and goals

Manuel Baum (born 30 August 1979) is a German football manager and former player. He currently manages FC Augsburg in the Bundesliga.

== Coaching career ==
Baum became head coach of SpVgg Unterhaching on 4 January 2014, after two years working as director at the club.

In the summer of 2014, Baum was hired as youth coach at FC Augsburg. On 14 December 2016 he was promoted to the first team. He was sacked on 9 April 2019.

On 21 June 2019, Baum joined the DFB as head coach of the Germany under-20s. He also had a brief stint in charge of the under-18s in 2020.

On 30 September 2020, Baum signed a two-year contract with Schalke 04. After Schalke could not win any of ten Bundesliga games with him, he was fired on 18 December 2020.

In December 2025, he was named manager of FC Augsburg on a short term contract until the end of the season. In May 2026, his contract was extended until 2028.

== Managerial statistics ==
As of match played 22 November 2026

Team	From	To	Record					
Team	From	To	G	W	D	L	Win %	Ref.
SpVgg Unterhaching	4 January 2014	20 March 2014	8	1	1	6	12.50	
FC Augsburg II	11 November 2015	31 December 2015	2	0	2	0	0.00	
FC Augsburg	14 December 2016	9 April 2019	87	25	24	38	28.74	
Germany U20	21 June 2019	30 June 2020	5	4	0	1	80.00	
Germany U18	1 July 2020	30 September 2020	2	0	1	1	0.00	
Schalke 04	30 September 2020	18 December 2020	11	1	4	6	9.09	
FC Augsburg	1 December 2025	present	34	14	9	11	41.18	
Total			149	45	41	63	30.20	—
