= Rodrigo Ribeiro (footballer, born 2005) =

Portuguese footballer (born 2005)

Personal information
- Full name: Rodrigo Duarte Ribeiro
- Date of birth: 28 April 2005 (age 21)
- Place of birth: Viana do Castelo, Portugal
- Height: 1.85 m (6 ft 1 in)
- Position: Forward

Team information
- Current team: FC Augsburg
- Number: 21

Youth career
- 2014–2016: Perspectiva em Jogo
- 2016–2017: Alfenense
- 2017–2022: Sporting CP

Senior career*
Years	Team	Apps	(Gls)
2022–2026	Sporting CP B	52	(16)
2022–2026	Sporting CP	7	(0)
2023–2024	→ Nottingham Forest (loan)	4	(0)
2024–2025	→ AVS (loan)	20	(1)
2026	→ FC Augsburg (loan)	14	(2)
2026–	FC Augsburg	8	(2)

International career^{‡}
2019–2021	Portugal U16	6	(1)
2021–2022	Portugal U17	11	(7)
2022–2024	Portugal U19	19	(9)
2022–2026	Portugal U20	15	(3)
2026–	Portugal U21	2	(0)
Medal record
Men's football
Representing Portugal
UEFA European Under-19 Championship
Runner-up	2023 Malta
- * Club domestic league appearances and goals as of 31 October 2026 ‡ National team caps and goals as of 21:43, 31 March 2026 (UTC)

Rodrigo Duarte Ribeiro (born 28 April 2005) is a Portuguese professional footballer who plays as a forward for Bundesliga club FC Augsburg.

== Club career ==
A youth product of Perspectiva em Jogo, Alfenense, and Sporting CP, Ribeiro signed his first professional contract with Sporting on 13 May 2021. He was promoted to the senior team of Sporting on 8 March 2022. He made his professional debut with Sporting CP in a 0–0 UEFA Champions League tie with Manchester City on 9 March 2022, coming on as a late sub in the 91' minute.

On 31 January 2024, Ribeiro extended his contract with Sporting CP until June 2028, with his release clause being set at €80 million. He subsequently was loaned to Premier League side Nottingham Forest for the remainder of the season, with Forest holding an option to make the move permanent, reported to be around €12 million.

On 15 January 2026, Ribeiro was sent on loan to Bundesliga club Augsburg until the end of the season, with an optional buy-clause reported to be €6 million.

On 27 May 2026, Augsburg made the transfer permanent and signed a five-year contract with Ribeiro.

== International career ==
Ribeiro is a youth international for Portugal, having represented the Portugal U16 and U17s.

== Career statistics ==
=== Club ===
As of match played 31 October 2026

Appearances and goals by club, season and competition
Club	Season	League			National cup (Note: Includes FA Cup, Taça de Portugal, DFB-Pokal)		League cup (Note: Includes Taça da Liga)		Europe		Other		Total	
Club	Season	Division	Apps	Goals	Apps	Goals	Apps	Goals	Apps	Goals	Apps	Goals	Apps	Goals
Sporting CP B	2021–22	Liga 3	8	3	—		—		—		—		8	3
Sporting CP B	2022–23	Liga 3	24	6	—		—		—		—		24	6
Sporting CP B	2023–24	Liga 3	10	2	—		—		—		—		10	2
Sporting CP B	2025–26	Liga Portugal 2	8	4	—		—		—		—		8	4
Sporting CP B	Total		50	15	—		—		—		—		50	15
Sporting CP	2021–22	Primeira Liga	4	0	0	0	0	0	1 (Note: Appearance in UEFA Champions League)	0	0	0	5	0
Sporting CP	2022–23	Primeira Liga	2	0	0	0	0	0	0	0	—		2	0
Sporting CP	2024–25	Primeira Liga	1	0	0	0	0	0	0	0	1 (Note: Appearance in Supertaça Cândido de Oliveira)	0	2	0
Sporting CP	2025–26	Primeira Liga	0	0	1	0	1	0	1	0	0	0	3	0
Sporting CP	Total		7	0	1	0	1	0	2	0	1	0	12	0
Nottingham Forest (loan)	2023–24	Premier League	4	0	1	0	—		—		—		5	0
AVS (loan)	2024–25	Primeira Liga	20	1	1	0	—		—		2 (Note: Appearances in Primeira Liga relegation play-offs)	0	23	1
FC Augsburg (loan)	2025–26	Bundesliga	14	2	—		—		—		—		14	2
FC Augsburg	2026–27	Bundesliga	8	2	2	2	—		—		—		10	4
Career total			103	20	5	2	1	0	2	0	3	0	114	22
