= Frederik Schmahl =

German footballer

Personal information
- Full name: Julius Frederik Schmahl
- Date of birth: 21 December 2002 (age 23)
- Place of birth: Berlin, Germany
- Height: 1.83 m (6 ft 0 in)
- Position: Midfielder

Team information
- Current team: SV Elversberg
- Number: 17

Youth career
- 2011–2019: Union Berlin
- Energie Cottbus

Senior career*
| Years | Team | Apps | (Gls) |
| 2021–2022 | FSV Luckenwalde | 35 | (7) |
| 2022–2024 | TSG Hoffenheim II | 58 | (12) |
| 2024– | SV Elversberg | 62 | (5) |
- * Club domestic league appearances and goals as of 22:30, 30 October 2026 (UTC)

Julius Frederik Schmahl (born 21 December 2002) is a German footballer who plays as a midfielder for Bundesliga club SV Elversberg.

== Club career ==
Schmahl played for the youth academy of 1. FC Union Berlin. For the 2020–21, he moved to the youth academy of Energie Cottbus where he finished his development. In the summer of 2021, he joined FSV 63 Luckenwalde in the Regionalliga. His performances in the Regionalliga earned him a move to TSG Hoffenheim's reserves.

On 9 April 2024, Schmahl joined SV Elversberg ahead of the 2024–25 season in the 2. Bundesliga, signing a contract until 2027.

== Career statistics ==
As of match played 30 October 2026

Appearances and goals by club, season and competition
| Club | Season | League | | | DFB-Pokal | | Other | | Total | |
| Club | Season | Division | Apps | Goals | Apps | Goals | Apps | Goals | Apps | Goals |
|---|---|---|---|---|---|---|---|---|---|---|
| FSV Luckenwalde | 2021–22 | Regionalliga Nordost | 35 | 7 | — | | 2 (Note: Appearances in Brandenburg Cup) | 0 | 37 | 7 |
| TSG Hoffenheim II | 2022–23 | Regionalliga Südwest | 26 | 3 | — | | — | | 26 | 3 |
| TSG Hoffenheim II | 2023–24 | Regionalliga Südwest | 32 | 9 | — | | — | | 32 | 9 |
| TSG Hoffenheim II | Total | | 58 | 12 | — | | — | | 58 | 12 |
| SV Elversberg | 2024–25 | 2. Bundesliga | 30 | 1 | 2 | 1 | 1 (Note: Appearance in Bundesliga promotion play-offs) | 0 | 33 | 2 |
| SV Elversberg | 2025–26 | 2. Bundesliga | 28 | 3 | 1 | 0 | — | | 29 | 3 |
| SV Elversberg | 2026–27 | Bundesliga | 4 | 1 | 1 | 0 | — | | 5 | 1 |
| SV Elversberg | Total | | 62 | 5 | 4 | 1 | 1 | 0 | 67 | 6 |
| Career total | | | 155 | 24 | 4 | 1 | 3 | 0 | 162 | 25 |
