= Hennes Behrens =

German footballer (born 2005)

Personal information
- Date of birth: 19 January 2005 (age 21)
- Place of birth: Frankfurt, Germany
- Height: 1.77 m (5 ft 10 in)
- Position: Left-back

Team information
- Current team: FC Augsburg
- Number: 16

Youth career
- 2019–2020: Darmstadt 98
- 2020–2025: TSG Hoffenheim

Senior career*
Years	Team	Apps	(Gls)
2024–2026	TSG Hoffenheim II	30	(4)
2025–2026	TSG Hoffenheim	1	(0)
2026	→ 1. FC Heidenheim (loan)	16	(1)
2026–	FC Augsburg	8	(0)

International career^{‡}
2026–	Germany U21	2	(0)
2026–	Germany	1	(0)
- * Club domestic league appearances and goals as of 31 October 2026 ‡ National team caps and goals as of 20:35, 17 November 2026 (UTC)

Hennes Behrens (born 19 January 2005) is a German professional footballer who plays as a left-back for Bundesliga club FC Augsburg and the Germany national team.

== Club career ==
Behrens is a youth product of Darmstadt 98, then moved to the youth academy of TSG Hoffenheim in 2020. He debuted with Hoffenheim II in the Regionalliga in 2024. He made his senior and professional debut with Hoffenheim as a substitute in a 4–3 UEFA Europa League win over Anderlecht on 30 January 2025.

On 2 January 2026, Behrens was loaned by 1. FC Heidenheim until the end of the 2025–26 season.

On 13 July 2026, Behrens signed a five-year contract with FC Augsburg.

== International career ==
In September 2026, Behrens was one of players who were called up with the Germany national team by head coach Jürgen Klopp for the 2026–27 UEFA Nations League matches against Netherlands, Greece, Serbia and Greece between 24 September and 4 October 2026.

He was one of the players who were called up with the Germany U21 national team by head coach Antonio Di Salvo for the friendly match against Croatia U21 on 18 November 2026.

== Career statistics ==
=== Club ===
As of match played 31 October 2026

Appearances and goals by club, season and competition
Club	Season	League			Cup		Europe		Other		Total	
Club	Season	Division	Apps	Goals	Apps	Goals	Apps	Goals	Apps	Goals	Apps	Goals
TSG Hoffenheim II	2024–25	Regionalliga Südwest	26	4	—		—		—		26	4
TSG Hoffenheim II	2025–26	3. Liga	4	0	—		—		—		4	0
TSG Hoffenheim II	Total		30	4	—		—		—		30	4
TSG Hoffenheim	2024–25	Bundesliga	1	0	0	0	1 (Note: Appearance(s) in the UEFA Europa League)	0	0	0	2	0
1. FC Heidenheim (loan)	2025–26	Bundesliga	15	1	—		—		—		15	1
FC Augsburg	2026–27	Bundesliga	8	0	2	0	—		—		10	0
Career total			54	5	2	0	1	0	0	0	57	5

=== International ===
As of match played 27 September 2026

Appearances and goals by national team and year
National team	Year	Apps	Goals
Germany	2026	1	0
Total		1	0
