= David Mokwa =

French footballer (born 2004)

Personal information
- Full name: David Mokwa Ngabi Ntusu
- Date of birth: 3 May 2004 (age 22)
- Place of birth: Bagnolet, France
- Height: 1.81 m (5 ft 11 in)
- Position: Forward

Team information
- Current team: SV Elversberg
- Number: 42

Youth career
- 2012–2017: CSM Clamart
- 2017–2020: AS Meudon
- 2020–2022: Sochaux
- 2022–2025: TSG Hoffenheim

Senior career*
Years	Team	Apps	(Gls)
2021	Sochaux II	1	(0)
2023–2025	TSG Hoffenheim II	69	(29)
2024–2026	TSG Hoffenheim	2	(0)
2026–	SV Elversberg	25	(8)

International career^{‡}
2022	France U18	2	(0)
2022	France U19	3	(1)
- * Club domestic league appearances and goals as of 30 October 2026 ‡ National team caps and goals as of 22 November 2022

David Mokwa Ngabi Ntusu (born 3 May 2004) is a French professional footballer who plays as a forward for Bundesliga club SV Elversberg.

== Early life ==
Mokwa was born on 3 May 2004 in Bagnolet, France. The son of Cameroonian parents, he grew up in Île-de-France, France and has four siblings.

== Club career ==
As a youth player, Mokwa joined the academy of French side AS Meudon. In 2020, he joined the academy of French side Sochaux. Subsequently, he joined the academy of German side TSG Hoffenheim in 2022. In 2023, he was promoted to the club's reserve team before being promoted to their first team in 2024. On 18 January 2025, Mokwa made his Bundesliga debut for TSG Hoffenheim as a late substitute in a 3–1 victory over Holstein Kiel. On 23 January 2025, he scored his first goal for them during a 2–3 home loss to Tottenham Hotspur in the UEFA Europa League.

On 28 January 2025, TSG Hoffenheim extended their contract with Mokwa.

On 3 January 2026, Mokwa moved to 2. Bundesliga side SV Elversberg on a three-and-a-half-year contract.

== Career statistics ==
As of match played 30 October 2026

Appearances and goals by club, season and competition
Club	Season	League			National cup		Europe		Other		Total	
Club	Season	Division	Apps	Goals	Apps	Goals	Apps	Goals	Apps	Goals	Apps	Goals
Sochaux II	2021–22	CFA 2	1	0	—		—		—		1	0
TSG Hoffenheim II	2022–23	Regionalliga Südwest	7	1	—		—		—		7	1
TSG Hoffenheim II	2023–24	Regionalliga Südwest	22	5	—		—		—		22	5
TSG Hoffenheim II	2024–25	Regionalliga Südwest	32	20	—		—		—		32	20
TSG Hoffenheim II	2025–26	Regionalliga Südwest	8	3	—		—		—		8	3
TSG Hoffenheim II	Total		69	29	—		—		—		69	29
TSG Hoffenheim	2024–25	Bundesliga	2	0	—		2 (Note: Appearances in UEFA Europa League)	2	—		4	2
SV Elversberg	2025–26	2. Bundesliga	17	6	—		—		—		17	6
SV Elversberg	2026–27	Bundesliga	8	2	2	0	—		—		10	2
SV Elversberg	Total		25	8	2	0	—		—		27	8
Career total			97	37	2	0	2	2	0	0	101	39
