= Raif Adam =

German footballer

Personal information
- Date of birth: 7 September 2005 (age 21)
- Place of birth: Hamburg, Germany
- Height: 1.88 m (6 ft 2 in)
- Position: Winger

Team information
- Current team: SV Elversberg
- Number: 15

Youth career
- SV Lurup
- 2019–2022: Hamburger SV
- 2022–2024: Eimsbütteler TV

Senior career*
Years	Team	Apps	(Gls)
2024–2025	SC Victoria Hamburg	20	(11)
2025	Eimsbütteler TV	13	(2)
2025–2026	Hamburger SV II	21	(7)
2026–	SV Elversberg	13	(1)
2026–	SV Elversberg II	4	(0)
- * Club domestic league appearances and goals as of 30 October 2026

Raif Adam (born 7 September 2005) is a German professional footballer who plays as a winger for Bundesliga club SV Elversberg.

== Club career ==
Adam began his career at SV Lurup before joining the youth academy of Hamburger SV in 2019. In 2022, he moved Eimsbütteler TV where he finished his development. He followed that up with a move to SC Victoria Hamburg followed by a return to Eimsbütteler TV, where he played in the Oberliga. In the summer of 2025, Adam returned to Hamburg, where he played with their reserves in the Regionalliga.

On 5 January 2026, Adam transferred to SV Elversberg in the 2. Bundesliga on a contract until 30 June 2029. He scored his first goal in professional football in stoppage time of a 5–1 win over SC Paderborn 07 on 4 May 2026, a result that earned Elversberg an automatic qualification to the Bundesliga for the first time in their history.

== Personal life ==
Born in Germany, Adam is of Ghanaian descent.

== Career statistics ==
As of match played 30 October 2026

Appearances and goals by club, season and competition
Club	Season	League			Cup		Other		Total	
Club	Season	Division	Apps	Goals	Apps	Goals	Apps	Goals	Apps	Goals
Victoria Hamburg	2024–25	Oberliga Hamburg	20	11	—		3 (Note: Appearances in Hamburg Cup)	2	23	13
Eimsbütteler TV	2024–25	Oberliga Hamburg	13	2	—		—		13	2
Hamburger SV II	2025–26	Regionalliga Nord	21	7	—		—		21	7
SV Elversberg	2025–26	2. Bundesliga	10	1	—		—		10	1
SV Elversberg	2026–27	Bundesliga	3	0	—		—		3	0
SV Elversberg	Total		13	1	—		—		13	1
SV Elversberg II	2026–27	Oberliga Rheinland-Pfalz/Saar	4	0	—		—		4	0
Career total			71	21	0	0	3	2	74	23
