= Uchenna Ogundu =

Nigerian footballer (born 2006)

Personal information
- Date of birth: 12 May 2006 (age 20)
- Place of birth: Nigeria
- Height: 1.88 m (6 ft 2 in)
- Position: Forward

Team information
- Current team: FC Augsburg
- Number: 39

Youth career
- –2024: Diamond Football Academy

Senior career*
Years	Team	Apps	(Gls)
2024–2025	Şanlıurfaspor	19	(6)
2025–2026	Alanyaspor	17	(2)
2026–	FC Augsburg	7	(0)
- * Club domestic league appearances and goals as of 31 October 2026

Uchenna Ogundu (born 12 May 2006) is a Nigerian professional footballer who plays as a forward for Bundesliga club FC Augsburg.

== Career ==
As a youth player, Ogundu joined Nigerian side Diamond Football Academy. Following his stint there, he joined the youth academy of Turkish side Şanlıurfaspor during the summer of 2024 and was promoted to the club's senior team in 2025, where he made nineteen league appearances and scored six goals.

Ahead of the 2025–26 season, he signed for Turkish side Alanyaspor. Turkish newspaper wrote in 2025 that he "quickly became a shining star in Alanyaspor's attacking line" while playing for the club.

On 2 February 2026, Ogundu signed a five-and-a-half-year contract with FC Augsburg in Germany.

== Style of play ==
Ogundu plays as a forward. Right-footed, he has received comparisons to Nigeria international Victor Osimhen.

== Career statistics ==
As of match played 31 October 2026

Appearances and goals by club, season and competition
Club	Season	League			National cup		Europe		Total	
Club	Season	Division	Apps	Goals	Apps	Goals	Apps	Goals	Apps	Goals
Şanlıurfaspor	2024–25	TFF 1. Lig	19	6	—		—		19	6
Alanyaspor	2025–26	Süper Lig	17	2	3	1	—		20	3
FC Augsburg	2025–26	Bundesliga	5	0	—		—		5	0
FC Augsburg	2026–27	Bundesliga	2	0	0	0	—		2	0
FC Augsburg	Total		7	0	0	0	—		7	0
Career total			43	8	3	1	0	0	46	9
