= Tim Schnitzer =

German footballer (born 2008)

Personal information
- Date of birth: February 7, 2008 (age 18)
- Place of birth: Augsburg, Germany
- Height: 1.86 m (6 ft 1 in)
- Position: Defensive midfielder

Team information
- Current team: FC Augsburg
- Number: 37

Youth career
- 2018–2026: FC Augsburg

Senior career*
| Years | Team | Apps | (Gls) |
| 2026– | FC Augsburg II | 5 | (0) |
| 2026– | FC Augsburg | 1 | (0) |

International career^{‡}
| 2024 | Germany U16 | 2 | (0) |
| 2024–2025 | Germany U17 | 9 | (0) |
| 2026– | Germany U18 | 2 | (0) |
- * Club domestic league appearances and goals as of 14:48, 14 July 2026 (UTC) ‡ National team caps and goals as of 14:48, 14 July 2026 (UTC)

Tim Schnitzer (born 7 February 2008) is a German professional footballer who plays as a defensive midfielder for the Bundesliga club FC Augsburg.

== Club career ==
Schnitzer joined the youth academy of his hometown club FC Augsburg as a U10, where he worked his way up all their youth categories. On 28 November 2024, he signed his first long-term contract with the club and started training with their U17s. In 2026, he was promoted to Augsburg's reserves in the Regionalliga. On 7 March 2026, he made his senior and professional debut with the senior Augsburg team in a 2–1 loss to RB Leipzig.

== International career ==
Schnitzer is a youth international for Germany, having first played with the Germany U17s in 2024.
