= Vincent Wagner =

German football manager (born 1986)

Personal information
- Date of birth: 5 April 1986 (age 40)
- Place of birth: Nordhausen, East Germany
- Height: 1.89 m (6 ft 2 in)
- Positions: Defender; forward

Team information
- Current team: SV Elversberg (head coach)

Senior career*
Years	Team	Apps	(Gls)
–2007	FC Mecklenburg Schwerin		
2007–2014	Rot-Weiss Essen	100	(6)
2009–2011	→ Rot-Weiss Essen II	31	(8)
2014–2016	FC Kray	54	(6)
2016–2017	KFC Uerdingen 05	15	(1)
2017–2020	RuWa Dellwig		

Managerial career
- 2022–2025: TSG Hoffenheim II
- 2025–: SV Elversberg
- * Club domestic league appearances and goals

Vincent Wagner (born 5 April 1986) is a German football coach and former player. He is the head coach of Bundesliga club SV Elversberg.

== Playing career ==
Wagner started his playing career with FC Mecklenburg Schwerin. Following his stint there, he signed for Rot-Weiss Essen in 2007, where he made one-hundred league appearances and scored six goals.

== Managerial career ==
During the summer of 2014, Wagner was appointed as a youth assistant manager of FC Kray. Three years later, he was appointed as an assistant manager of VfL Bochum. Subsequently, he was appointed as a youth manager of MSV Duisburg.

Four years later, he was appointed manager of TSG Hoffenheim II, helping the club achieve promotion from the fourth tier to the third tier. Ahead of the 2025–26 season, he was appointed manager of SV Elversberg, helping the club achieve promotion from the 2. Bundesliga to the Bundesliga.

== Personal life ==
Wagner was born on 5 April 1986. Born in Nordhausen, Germany, he has a daughter.
