= FC Augsburg =

German association football club

- Full name: Fußball-Club Augsburg 1907 e. V.
- Nicknames: Fuggerstädter (named after the famous Fugger family of Augsburg, founders of the Fuggerei)
- Founded: 8 August 1907; 119 years ago
- Stadium: WWK Arena
- Capacity: 30,660
- Owner(s): Hofmann Investoren GmbH (99,4%); Global Football Holdings (45%)
- President: Markus Krapf
- Head coach: Manuel Baum
- League: Bundesliga
- 2025–26: Bundesliga, 9th of 18
- Website: fcaugsburg.de
Home colours	Away colours	Third colours

Fußball-Club Augsburg 1907 e. V., commonly known as FC Augsburg (German pronunciation: [ɛfˌt͡seː ˈaʊ̯ksbʊʁk]), is a German professional football club based in Augsburg, Bavaria. FC Augsburg plays in the Bundesliga, the top tier of the German football league system. The team was founded as Fußball-Klub Alemannia Augsburg in 1907 and played as BC Augsburg from 1921 to 1969. With over 27,000 members, it is the largest football club in Bavarian Swabia.

The club has spent most of its history fluctuating between the second and third divisions, with disappointment striking in the early 2000s when Augsburg were relegated to the fourth division for two seasons. However, the club experienced a surge following this setback, and was eventually promoted to the Bundesliga for the first time in 2011, where it has remained ever since. Augsburg have consolidated their Bundesliga status in the 2010s, finishing a record high fifth in the 2014–15 season before several mid-table finishes, and made their European debut in the 2015–16 UEFA Europa League, with the club reaching the Round of 32 before being knocked out by Liverpool 1–0 on aggregate.

Since 2009, FC Augsburg's stadium has been the 30,660 capacity WWK ARENA, located south of Augsburg city centre and easily accessible via tram. The club, known as the Fuggerstädter or simply as FCA, receive strong home support with an average attendance of 29,301 in the 2023–24 Bundesliga season (95.6% of stadium capacity). It is a single tier stadium with a standing terrace behind one of the goals, known as the Ulrich-Biesinger-Tribüne, and three seated stands with a standing section in the opposite corner to the Ulrich-Biesinger-Tribüne for away fans.

Augsburg maintains fierce local rivalries with Ingolstadt and TSV 1860 Munich. Matches between these clubs typically attract large crowds, and a match in 1973 at 1860 Munich set the all-time spectator record for the Olympic Stadium. FCA regularly sell out their local Bavarian derby against Bayern Munich.

The club's colours are red, green and white which can be found across the club's kits while the club badge is similar to the Augsburg city emblem. The club's training facilities are situated next to the stadium while a club shop is located near Augsburg Hauptbahnhof in the city centre.

== History ==
=== Formation ===
Crest of BC Augsburg (1921–1969)

A merger of Augsburg's two most successful clubs, TSV Schwaben and BC Augsburg, was discussed as early as the late 1940s, but distrust between the two sides and a fear that the other club would dominate the merger caused each side to hesitate, despite the financial trouble both clubs were in. A first serious meeting between the two sides was held in 1964, both clubs having dropped out of tier-one football by then. The leadership of the multi-sports club Schwaben was completely behind a merger, but the club's football department was not, and once more the process of forming FCA was stalled. Traditionally, BCA saw itself as a working-class club, based in the north of Augsburg, while Schwaben was the club of the more affluent and based south of the city, with the river Wertach forming something of a boundary between the two clubs territories.

In 1968, with BCA struggling in the third division after relegation from professional football the year before and Schwaben soon to follow, another effort was made. In April 1969, a high-level meeting between the two club bosses brought the decision to merge the clubs and name the new side FC Augsburg. FCA was to be a football club only, with no other sports department. The then-mayor of Augsburg, Hans Breuer, was one of the driving forces behind the move.

The merger came at a time of on-the-field decline for both sides, Schwaben had just been relegated from the tier-two Regionalliga Süd and decided that an attempt to regain their status was financially impossible, while BCA narrowly missed out on promotion to the league that season. In June, 256 of 265 of BCA's members present voted for the merger while, shortly after, 75 percent of Schwaben's members also approved the motion.

Schwaben, however, opted for the "small solution"—the club was to remain independent with only its football department merging into the new club. But even this move was not universally popular within the club, with some former members forming a new football club, Eintracht Augsburg, and restarting from the lowest level of the pyramid. For this reason, FCA is generally not considered to carry on the traditions of TSV Schwaben, only those of BC Augsburg. A year later, the footballers of Eintracht rejoined Schwaben but, since then, have always remained an amateur club. It took the new football department until 1981 to regain its third-division status, where they were to meet FCA for the first time in league football and renewed the Augsburg derby.

The new FCA played its first game on 30 July 1969, when it met 1. FC Nürnberg in Augsburg in front of 13,000, losing 0–3 in extra time.

=== Early years (1969–1974) ===
After the formation of the club in 1969, the side was to spend most of its time in tier-two and three leagues, the Bayernliga, Regionalliga Süd and the 2. Bundesliga. The new side, despite now concentrating Augsburg's football forces, was no instant success. A fourth-place finish in the league and dwindling supporter numbers proved that the new merger side had not yet been accepted in the city. The following season, FCA finished one place better in the league but, with an average support of 300 spectators per game, the club found it difficult to retain its top players. The 1971–72 season saw further decline, an eighth-place finish, but from there the team improved, winning the league the following year and returning professional football to the town. By then, the club had found acceptance in the town and, in the final game of the season, 15,000 spectators had turned up to celebrate the Bayernliga championship.

The 1973–74 season saw the return of one of Augsburg's greatest football talents to the city, and the FCA—former German international Helmut Haller had returned to the club after 11 years in Italy playing for Bologna and Juventus. FCA paid DM 44,000 for the transfer of Haller.

FCA became an instant success in the Regionalliga, drawing an average crowd of over 22,000 for its home matches. When the club traveled to Munich to meet 1860 Munich in the then-new Olympic Stadium, 80,000 flocked to the game, starting what remains today as a fierce rivalry between the two clubs. FCA dominated the season, eventually winning the league title as a freshly promoted team. The mood in Augsburg was one of excitement, and the newspapers spoke of the atmosphere in the stadium as of "Augsburg, the Napoli of Germany."

Augsburg qualified for the promotion round for the Bundesliga through its league title, where it met four other teams to determine the one available spot in the first division. FCA gave away easy points at home, drawing three times in four games. Away, the team lost only once, against Rot-Weiß Oberhausen, but nevertheless came only second, one point behind Tennis Borussia Berlin, who earned promotion. Nevertheless, FCA had qualified for the southern division of the new 2. Bundesliga through its league title.

=== Stagnation (1974–1983) ===
The success of 1973–74 was quickly replaced with relegation trouble in the new 2. Bundesliga. The next five seasons saw lower table finishes, the temporary departure of Helmut Haller and frequent replacements of managers. By 1978–79, the club was unable to avoid relegation, despite Haller, at the age of 40, once more taking to the field for FCA for a last time. The club, after six seasons in the second division, returned to the Bayernliga.

FCA was able to break the fall and win the Bavarian league title to gain promotion back to the 2. Bundesliga straight away in 1979–80. On top of this, the team qualified for the German amateur football championship, where it advanced to the final before losing to VfB Stuttgart's reserve side. But the club's promotion back to the second level faced a major obstacle. The 2. Bundesliga, after 1981, was to operate in a single division and with half as many clubs as before, meaning the club had to fulfill the qualifying norm, not an easy task for a freshly promoted side. FCA finished 18th in 1980–81, not enough to hold the league in a normal season and definitely not enough in 1981.

The club once more won the Bavarian league on its first attempt, defeating Schwaben in the first two Augsburg league derbies since 1968, but now had to enter a promotion round to determine the two teams that would go up out of the four Southern German league champions. FCA came second behind FSV Frankfurt and returned to the 2. Bundesliga once more, despite some of the gate receipts already being processed during the game against FC 08 Homburg by the tax department due to outstanding debts. However, the side was again not strong enough for this level and was relegated on a slightly worse goal average then 16th-placed Union Solingen, lacking three goals to salvation. It was to be Augsburg's last season in the second tier for almost a quarter of a century.

=== Bayernliga: 1983 to 1994 ===
FCA was to spend the next 11 seasons once more in Bavaria's highest league, the Bayernliga, at the time still the third tier of league football in the state. With the gradual reduction of the number of second divisions from five in 1974 to one in 1981, a number of Bavarian clubs that had once played at higher level had now dropped down to this level, and competition in the league was much stronger than in the past: 1860 Munich, SpVgg Bayreuth, SpVgg Fürth, Jahn Regensburg, MTV Ingolstadt, FC Schweinfurt 05 and Bayern Hof had all played with Augsburg in the 2. Bundesliga in recent years.

While the club was one of the top sides in the league, another title did not seem to materialise; a second-place finish in 1985 being the best result, one point behind champions SpVgg Bayreuth. Again, the club changed managers frequently but had settled into the Bayernliga for good, it seemed. It was only when Armin Veh took over the team in 1991 that fortunes for the team seemed to improve, not harmed by the fact 1860 Munich made its "escape" from the league and returned to professional football that year.

In 1993, the club won its one and only national championship to date, when 1. FC Kaiserslautern was defeated in the German Under-19 championship final.

In 1994, the club had another try at promotion in the last year of promotion play-offs to the 2. Bundesliga. However, this time the Bavarian champion was not grouped with the other Southern German clubs as in previous years, and thus had to face stronger clubs in the northern group that included Eintracht Braunschweig and Fortuna Düsseldorf. Despite being overmatched and unable to advance, they still received strong support in the region with crowds of over 20,000 turning up at the games. While the performance was not enough to gain entry to the 2. Bundesliga, FCA did qualify for the new Regionalliga Süd, which was slotted between the second division and the Bayernliga as the new third tier.

=== Regionalliga (1994–2000) ===
Augsburg spent the first four years in the new league as a mid-table side, never getting anywhere near the promotion ranks. The fifth season then saw a decline, with the team only finishing 14th and only two points clear of a relegation spot.

The following year was once more a qualifying season, with the number of Regionalligas being reduced in numbers from four to two. FCA fulfilled the on-the-field requirement, finishing eighth, its best Regionalliga result to that date. Financially, however, the club was in dire straits, with a real possibility of the club folding. While the latter threat was averted, FCA was refused a Regionalliga licence when a potential investor backed out and the German Football Association (DFB) relegated it to the Bayernliga, now the fourth tier. Main sponsor Infomatec, which had promised to provide a DM 3 million security for the club with the DFB, was unable to do so and, faced with debts of DM 1.8 million, the club was not in the financial position to obtain a Regionalliga licence.

=== Recovery (2000–2011) ===
Financial rescue came in the form of Walther Seinsch, a local entrepreneur, who took over as chairman and introduced sound financial management to the club. The club was able to field a competitive team in the Bayernliga once more and achieved promotion back to the Regionalliga in its second season, in 2002.

The club returned as a force in the third division, earning top-four finishes in all of the next four seasons there. FCA came achingly close to advancing to 2. Bundesliga in 2005, but missed their opportunity after giving up two goals to Jahn Regensburg in the last four minutes of their final game of the season. The club dominated the Regionalliga Süd the next year, winning the league and clinching a berth in the 2. Bundesliga for the 2006–07 season.

This marked their first appearance in the 2. Bundesliga in 23 years. They finished the campaign in seventh place on 52 points, only eight points away from promotion to the top-flight. Once again, the game at 1860 Munich was the highlight, with a 3–0 victory for Augsburg in front of 69,000 in the Allianz Arena. Ralf Loose replaced Rainer Hörgl as head coach in October 2007 when the club found itself in the relegation zone. Loose's contract was terminated on 16 April 2008 after a string of bad results. He was replaced with Holger Fach two days later. The club avoided relegation on goal average, being on equal points with relegated side Kickers Offenbach at the end of the season.

The longtime home ground of the FCA, Rosenaustadion, built from World War II rubble, finally came to its well-deserved rest in 2009 when a new stadium was completed. The new Augsburg Arena also hosted games of the 2011 FIFA Women's World Cup.

Under Dutch manager Jos Luhukay, Augsburg enjoyed a successful season in 2009–10, when the club reached the semi-finals of the DFB-Pokal as well as finishing third in the 2. Bundesliga, which allowed it to play 1. FC Nürnberg for Bundesliga promotion. In two games there, the Franconians kept the upper hand and FCA was condemned to wait another year. However, at the end of the 2010–11 season, FC Augsburg finished second in the league and was promoted to the Bundesliga for the first time in its history.

=== Bundesliga and Europa League qualification (2011–present) ===
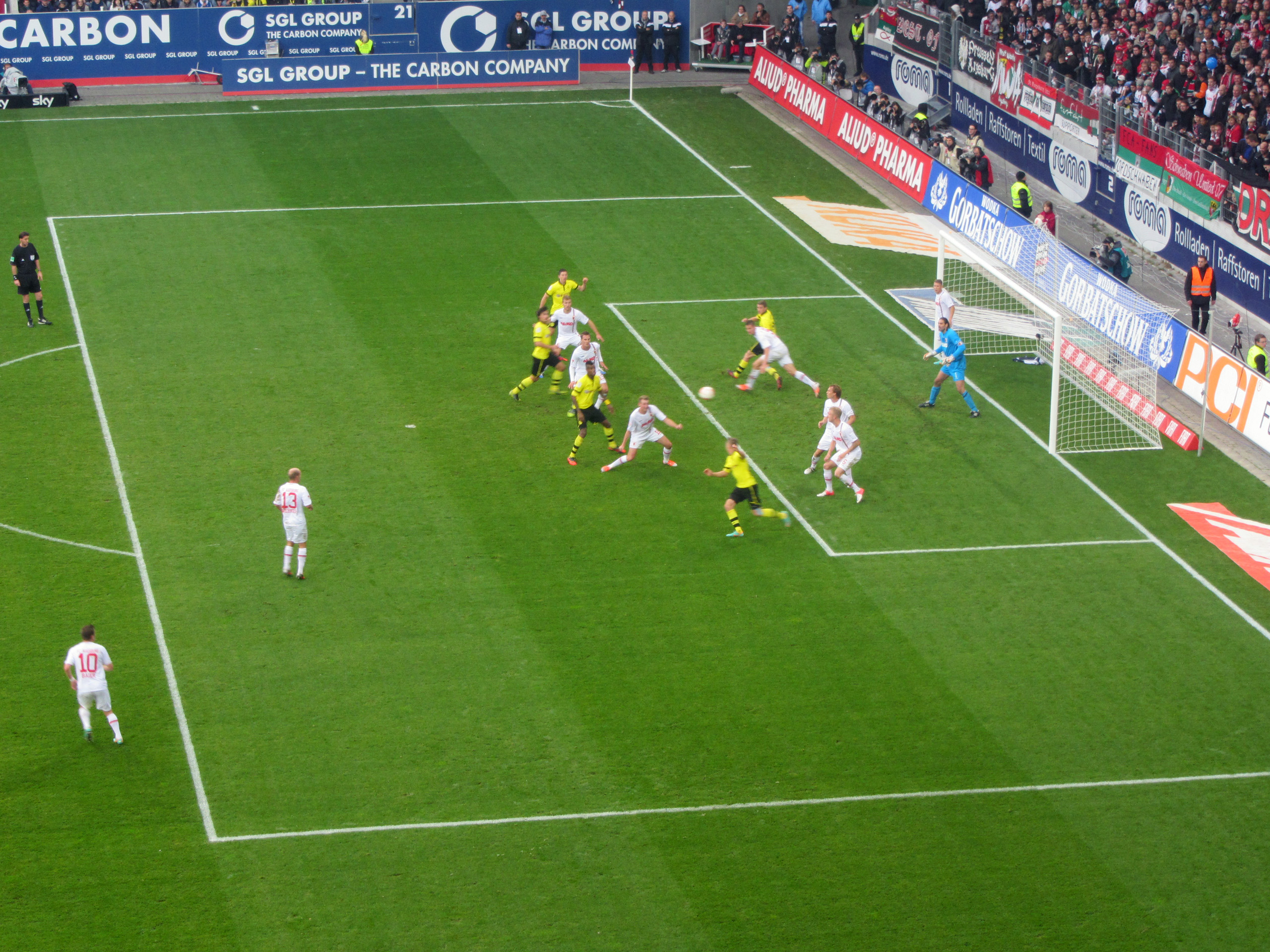
FC Augsburg against Borussia Dortmund in the Bundesliga in November 2012

On 15 October 2011, FCA won its first-ever game in the first division, defeating Mainz 05 1–0. On 28 April 2012, FCA retained their status as a Bundesliga club for a second year with a game to spare. Only a week later, Luhukay resigned from the FCA job, citing doubts with regards to the club's prospects as the reason. On 17 May 2012, the club appointed Markus Weinzierl as its new manager.

In its second Bundesliga season, FCA struggled even more than in its first year, accumulating only nine points in the first half of the season. However, FCA secured its top-flight survival in the last match of the season against Greuther Fürth with a 3–1 victory.

In 2013–14, FCA finished eighth in the league and competed, unsuccessfully, for an UEFA Europa League place, rather than struggling against relegation.

FCA began the 2014–15 season with a first round DFB-Pokal defeat against amateur fourth division side 1. FC Magdeburg.

FCA qualified for the 2015–16 Europa League after finishing fifth in the 2014–15 Bundesliga, their best ever finish. After a last-gasp 3–1 away win in the last group match at Partizan, FCA advanced to the knockout stage of the competition for the first time, being drawn against Liverpool in the round of 32. After a goalless first leg at the WWK ARENA, Augsburg fell to a narrow 1–0 defeat to the eventual Europa League runners-up at Anfield.

On 2 June 2016, Markus Weinzierl left FC Augsburg to become manager at Schalke 04, followed by the immediate signing of Dirk Schuster (then-outgoing manager at Darmstadt 98) as his successor. He was subsequently followed by Manuel Baum on 14 December 2016. In 2017–18, he led FCA to the most successful start in the Bundesliga history of Augsburg. In 2021, American investor David Blitzer purchased a 45% stake in the club from Klaus Hofmann. Hofmann stepped down and was replaced as president by Markus Krapf in September 2022.

== Kit ==
Augsburg's kits are predominantly white, with red and green kits also appearing from time to time.

== European record ==
=== Matches ===
Season	Competition	Round	Opponent	Home	Away	Aggregate
2015–16	UEFA Europa League	Group L	(Spain) Athletic Bilbao	2–3	1–3	2nd
2015–16	UEFA Europa League	Group L	(Netherlands) AZ	4–1	1–0	2nd
2015–16	UEFA Europa League	Group L	(Serbia) Partizan	1–3	3–1	2nd
2015–16	UEFA Europa League	R32	(England) Liverpool	0–0	0–1	0–1

== Players ==
=== Current squad ===
As of 9 September 2026

Note: Flags indicate national team as defined under FIFA eligibility rules; some limited exceptions apply. Players may hold more than one non-FIFA nationality.

No.	Pos.	Nation	Player
1	GK	GER	Finn Dahmen
2	DF	GER	Calvin Brackelmann
4	MF	FRA	Han-Noah Massengo
5	DF	FRA	Chrislain Matsima
6	DF	NED	Jeffrey Gouweleeuw (captain)
7	DF	KOR	Seol Young-woo
8	MF	GER	Sima Suso
9	FW	POR	Rodrigo Ribeiro
10	MF	GER	Mert Kömür
11	FW	AUT	Michael Gregoritsch
14	MF	GER	Yannik Keitel (on loan from VfB Stuttgart)
15	FW	BEN	Steve Mounié
16	DF	GER	Hennes Behrens
18	MF	GER	Tim Breithaupt

No.	Pos.	Nation	Player
19	MF	GER	Robin Fellhauer
20	MF	FRA	Alexis Claude-Maurice
21	MF	GER	Arijon Ibrahimović (on loan from Bayern Munich)
22	GK	CRO	Nediljko Labrović
23	FW	GER	Faik Sakar
27	DF	GER	Marius Wolf
30	MF	GER	Anton Kade
32	MF	SUI	Fabian Rieder
35	DF	SLE	Juma Bah (on loan from Manchester City)
37	MF	GER	Tim Schnitzer
39	FW	NGR	Uchenna Ogundu
40	DF	GER	Noahkai Banks
42	MF	TUR	Mahmut Küçükşahin
48	GK	GER	Tom Wisbereit

=== Out on loan ===
Note: Flags indicate national team as defined under FIFA eligibility rules; some limited exceptions apply. Players may hold more than one non-FIFA nationality.

No.	Pos.	Nation	Player
—	GK	POL	Marcel Łubik (at Wisła Kraków until 30 June 2027)
—	MF	CRO	Kristijan Jakić (at PAOK until 30 June 2027)
—	FW	LUX	Aiman Dardari (at Rot-Weiss Essen until 30 June 2027)
—	FW	FRA	Kyliane Dong (at Bolton Wanderers until 30 June 2027)

No.	Pos.	Nation	Player
—	FW	GER	Yusuf Kabadayı (at Rijeka until 30 June 2027)
—	FW	COD	Nathanaël Mbuku (at Sint-Truiden until 30 June 2027)
—	FW	TUN	Elias Saad (at Nashville until 30 June 2027)

== Coaching staff ==
As of 13 July 2026

Position	Staff
Head coach	(Germany) Manuel Baum
Assistant coach	(Germany) Alexander Frankenberger (Germany) Frank Fröhling
Goalkeeper coach	(Germany) Michael Weirich
Game and video analyst	(Germany) Benedikt Brust (Germany) Felix Kling
Rehabilitation and athletic trainer	(Germany) Andreas Bäumler (Germany) Frank Roßner (Germany) Christian Hahn
Team doctor	(Germany) Dr. Karsten Bogner (Germany) Dr. Jens-Ulrich Otto (Germany) Dr. Andreas Weigel
Head of physiotherapist	(Germany) Nikolaus Guschl
Physiotherapist	(Germany) David Müller (Germany) Marcel Schoder (Germany) Julian Binder (Germany) Tim Gulde
Team manager	(Germany) Philipp Dolla
Team coordinator	(Germany) Jan Reckord
Equipment manager	(Italy) Salvatore Belardo (Germany) Christoph Schade

== Managers ==
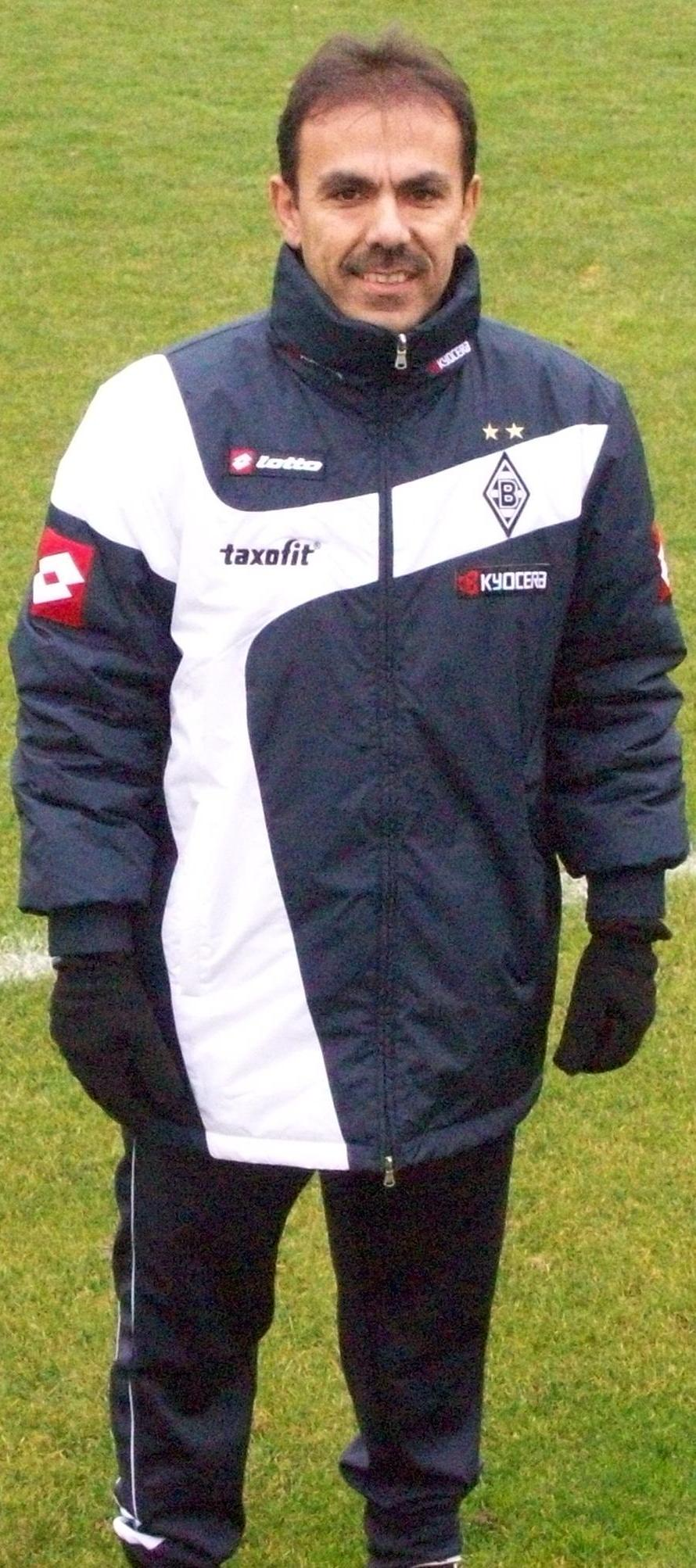
Former Augsburg manager Jos Luhukay, pictured here while at Borussia Mönchengladbach

Recent managers of the club:

Period	Manager
1 July 1980 – 31 March 1981	(Germany) Heinz Elzner
31 March 1981 – 31 May 1981	(Germany) Heiner Schuhmann (interim)
1 July 1982 – 30 June 1984	(Germany) Hannes Baldauf
1 July 1984 – 30 June 1986	(Germany) Paul Sauter
Oct 1986 – March 88	(Germany) Heiner Schuhmann
25 February 1989 – 4 October 1989	(Germany) Helmut Haller
5 October 1989 – 6 December 1989	(Germany) Jimmy Hartwig
22 January 1990 – 30 April 1990	(Germany) Dieter Schatzschneider
1 May 1990 – 31 May 1990	(Germany) Gernot Fuchs
1 June 1990 – 30 June 1995	(Germany) Armin Veh
7 May 1995 – 30 June 1995	(Germany) Helmut Riedl
1 July 1995 – 24 September 1996	(Germany) Karsten Wettberg
25 September 1996 – 31 December 1996	(Germany) Helmut Riedl
1 January 1997 – 18 April 1998	(Germany) Hubert Müller
19 April 1998 – 30 June 1998	(Germany) Helmut Riedl
1 July 1998 – 30 June 1999	(Germany) Gerd Schwickert
1 July 1999 – 1 December 1999	(Germany) Alfons Higl
2 December 1999 – 31 December 1999	(Germany) Heiner Schuhmann (interim)
1 January 2000 – 30 June 2000	(Germany) Hans-Jürgen Boysen
1 July 2000 – 30 June 2002	(Italy) Gino Lettieri
1 July 2002 – 28 September 2003	(Germany) Ernst Middendorp
13 October 2003 – 26 September 2004	(Germany) Armin Veh
27 September 2004 – 25 September 2007	(Germany) Rainer Hörgl
1 October 2007 – 16 April 2008	(Germany) Ralf Loose
18 April 2008 – 13 April 2009	(Germany) Holger Fach
14 April 2009 – 30 June 2012	(Netherlands) Jos Luhukay
1 July 2012 – 2 June 2016	(Germany) Markus Weinzierl
2 June 2016 – 14 December 2016	(Germany) Dirk Schuster
14 December 2016 – 9 April 2019	(Germany) Manuel Baum
9 April 2019 – 9 March 2020	(Switzerland) Martin Schmidt
10 March 2020 – 26 April 2021	(Germany) Heiko Herrlich
26 April 2021 – 14 May 2022	(Germany) Markus Weinzierl
1 July 2022 – 9 October 2023	(Germany) Enrico Maaßen
15 October 2023 – 23 May 2025	(Denmark) Jess Thorup
1 July 2025 – 1 December 2025	(Germany) Sandro Wagner
1 December 2025 – present	(Germany) Manuel Baum

== Stadium ==
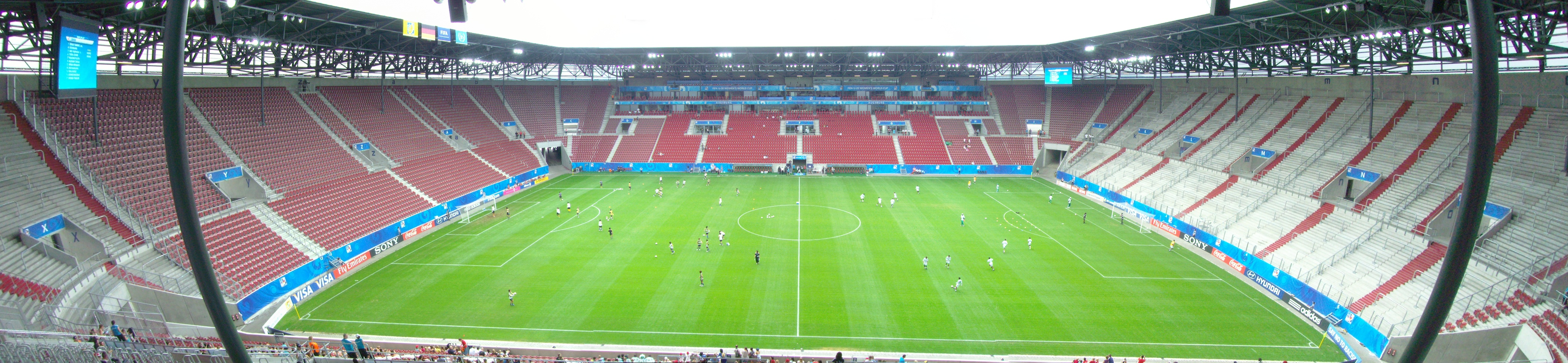
A panorama of WWK ARENA

== FC Augsburg seasons ==
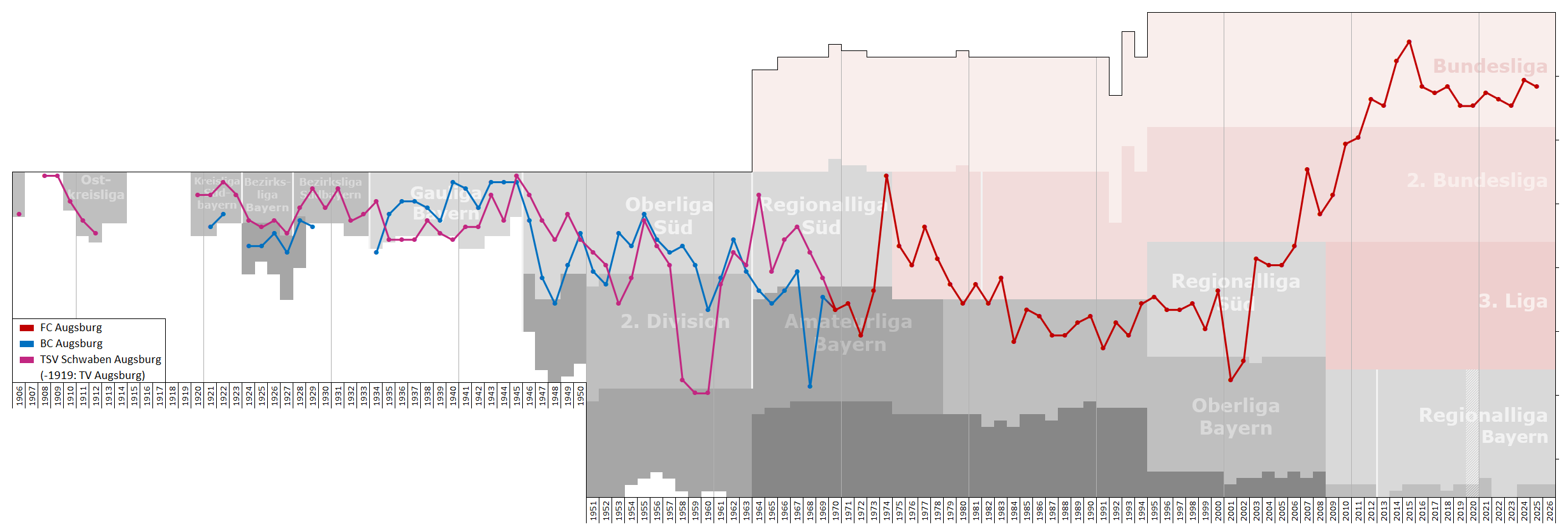
League performance of FC Augsburg and its predecessors

The last five season-by-season performance of the club:

Season	League	Tier	Pos	Pld	W	D	L	GF	GA	Pts^{[G]}	Cup	Coach(es)	Top scorer(s)	Goals	Ref.
2021–22	BL	I	14th	34	10	8	16	39	56	38	R2	Markus Weinzierl	Michael Gregoritsch	9	
2022–23	BL	I	15th	34	9	7	18	42	63	34	R2	Enrico Maaßen	Mërgim Berisha	9	
2023–24	BL	I	11th	34	10	9	15	50	60	39	R1	Enrico Maaßen Jess Thorup	Ermedin Demirović	15	
2024–25	BL	I	12th	34	11	10	13	35	51	43	QF	Jess Thorup	Alexis Claude-Maurice	9	
2025–26	BL	I	9th	34	12	7	15	45	61	43	R2	Sandro Wagner Manuel Baum	three players	6	

== Honours ==
=== League ===
- 2. Bundesliga
  - Runners-up: 2010–11
- Regionalliga Süd (II–III)
  - Champions: 1973–74, 2005–06
- Bayernliga (III–IV)
  - Champions: 1972–73, 1979–80, 1981–82, 1993–94, 2001–02
  - Runners-up: 1984–85

=== Cup ===
- DFB-Pokal
  - Semi-finals: 2009–10
- Schwaben Cup (Tiers III–V)
  - Winners (13): 1968–69, 1969–70, 1970–71, 1971–1972, 1979–80, 1985–86, 1987–88, 1992–93, 1995–96, 1998–99, 2001–02, 2003–04, 2004–05
  - Runners-up: 1991–92

=== Youth ===
- Under 19 Bundesliga
  - Champions: 1992–93
- Under 17 Bundesliga
  - Runners-up: 1978–79
- German Under 19 Cup
  - Winners: 1990–91, 1991–92, 1993–94, 1994–95
- Under 19 Bayernliga
  - Champions: 1977–78, 1989–90, 1992–93, 1996–97, 2009–10, 2011–12, 2015–16
  - Runners-up: 1975–76, 1978–79, 1988–89, 2004–05, 2008–09
- Under 17 Bayernliga
  - Champions: 1978–79, 1980–81, 1994–95, 2002–03, 2005–06, 2014–15
  - Runners-up: 1975–76, 1976–77, 1977–78, 1983–84, 1984–85, 1990–91, 2007–08, 2009–10
- Under 15 Bayernliga
  - Champions: 1995–96, 2009–10
  - Runners-up: 1980–81, 1982–83, 1984–85, 1996–97

== Youth and amateur sides ==
=== Youth ===
The historically indifferent performance of the senior side was offset by the success of the club's youth team, which captured a national championship in the Under 18's in 1993, being the last non-Bundesliga club to do so. They also took four Cup titles in the early 1990s, all under the guidance of coach Heiner Schuhmann. With Schuhmann's departure for Bayern Munich, the golden age of FCA youth football ended and the club could not quite achieve so highly again. With the formation of the Under 19 Bundesliga (2004) and Under 17 Bundesliga (2007), the club's youth teams slipped to second division status but recovered and, in 2013–14, the youth teams played in the Under 19 Bundesliga and Under 17 Bundesliga, the first tier of youth football in Germany at their respective age levels.

=== Reserve team ===
The club's reserve side had its greatest success before the merger, playing, as BC Augsburg Amateure, for a season in the southern division of the Amateurliga Bayern in 1962–63. A sixth place there allowed the side to qualify for the unified Bavarian league the following year, but, along with the decline of the senior team, the reserve side got relegated too, finishing 17th.

The team disappeared into the lower amateur leagues after that, but returned to the Landesliga Bayern-Süd in 1976, finishing runners-up in the league in its first season, now as FC Augsburg Amateure. By 1978 however, the side was relegated again, not to return to this level for a quarter of a decade. It did, however, take out the Schwaben Cup in 1977, and qualified for the first round of the 1977–78 DFB-Pokal. After away victories over second division side Arminia Hannover and fellow amateur side 1. FC Normannia Gmünd in the first two rounds, the team reached the third round, where it lost 0–4 to Hertha BSC.

After becoming a founding member of the Bezirksoberliga Schwaben in 1988, the team was withdrawn at the end of the season, disbanded altogether and not reformed for more than a decade.

Since 2004, the side once more played in the Landesliga Bayern-Süd, generally achieving good results and eventually being promoted to Regionalliga Bayern at the end of the 2011–12 season.
