= 2025–26 FC Augsburg season =

FC Augsburg
2025–26 season
- Chairman: Klaus Hofmann
- Head coach: Sandro Wagner (until 1 December 2025); Manuel Baum (interim, from 1 December 2025)
- Stadium: WWK Arena
- Bundesliga: 9th
- DFB-Pokal: Second round
- Top goalscorer: League: Michael Gregoritsch; Anton Kade; Fabian Rieder (6 each); All: Michael Gregoritsch; Anton Kade; Fabian Rieder (6 each)
- Highest home attendance: 30,660
- Lowest home attendance: 28,660
- Average home league attendance: 29,787
- Biggest win: 1–3 vs SC Freiburg, 23 August 2025, Bundesliga
- Biggest defeat: 0–6 vs RB Leipzig, 25 October 2025, Bundesliga
Home colours	Away colours	Third colours

The 2025–26 season was the 119th season in the history of FC Augsburg, and the club's 15th consecutive season in the Bundesliga. In addition to the domestic league, the club participated in the DFB-Pokal.

== Summary ==
On 28 May 2025, Sandro Wagner was appointed as manager of FC Augsburg. On 1 December 2025, he left the club by mutual consent, being replaced by interim manager Manuel Baum.

== Current squad ==
As of 2 February 2026

Note: Flags indicate national team as defined under FIFA eligibility rules; some limited exceptions apply. Players may hold more than one non-FIFA nationality.

No.	Pos.	Nation	Player
1	GK	GER	Finn Dahmen
3	DF	DEN	Mads Valentin
4	MF	FRA	Han-Noah Massengo
5	DF	FRA	Chrislain Matsima
6	DF	NED	Jeffrey Gouweleeuw (captain)
8	MF	KOS	Elvis Rexhbeçaj
9	FW	COD	Samuel Essende
11	MF	TUN	Ismaël Gharbi (on loan from Braga)
13	DF	GRE	Dimitris Giannoulis
14	MF	GER	Yannik Keitel (on loan from VfB Stuttgart)
16	DF	SUI	Cédric Zesiger
17	MF	CRO	Kristijan Jakić (vice-captain)
19	MF	GER	Robin Fellhauer
20	MF	FRA	Alexis Claude-Maurice
21	FW	POR	Rodrigo Ribeiro (on loan from Sporting)

No.	Pos.	Nation	Player
22	GK	CRO	Nediljko Labrović
25	GK	GER	Daniel Klein
27	DF	GER	Marius Wolf
30	MF	GER	Anton Kade
31	DF	GER	Keven Schlotterbeck
32	MF	SUI	Fabian Rieder
34	DF	BRA	Arthur Chaves (on loan from TSG Hoffenheim)
36	MF	GER	Mert Kömür
38	FW	AUT	Michael Gregoritsch (on loan from Brøndby)
39	FW	NGR	Uchenna Ogundu
40	DF	USA	Noahkai Banks
41	DF	GER	Felix Meiser
42	MF	TUR	Mahmut Kücüksahin
43	DF	AUT	Oliver Sorg

== Transfers ==
=== In ===
==== Summer ====
Date	Pos.	Player	From	Fee	Ref.
1 July 2025	DF	(France) Cédric Zesiger	(Germany) VfL Wolfsburg	€4,000,000	
1 July 2025	FW	(Tunisia) Elias Saad	(Germany) FC St. Pauli	€2,000,000	
1 July 2025	MF	(Germany) Robin Fellhauer	(Germany) SV Elversberg	€700,000	
1 July 2025	MF	(France) Kyliane Dong	(France) Troyes	Free	
1 July 2025	GK	(Germany) Tobias Jäger	(Germany) Augsburg II		

=== Out ===
==== Summer ====
Date	Pos.	Player	To	Fee	Ref.
1 July 2025	DF	(Germany) Felix Uduokhai	(Turkey) Beşiktaş	€5,000,000	
1 July 2025	FW	(France) Irvin Cardona	(France) Saint-Étienne	€2,500,000	
1 July 2025	DF	(Ghana) Patric Pfeiffer	(Germany) Darmstadt 98	€700,000	
1 July 2025	DF	(Poland) Robert Gumny	(Poland) Lech Poznań	Free	
1 July 2025	DF	(Germany) Lasse Günther	(Germany) SV Elversberg	Undisclosed	
1 July 2025	GK	(Poland) Marcel Lubik	(Poland) Górnik Zabrze	Loan	
1 July 2025	DF	(England) Reece Oxford	Unattached		–
8 July 2025	MF	(Democratic Republic of the Congo) Nathanaël Mbuku	(France) Montpellier	Loan	
11 July 2025	MF	(Finland) Fredrik Jensen	(Greece) Aris	Free	
12 September 2025	FW	(Germany) Yusuf Kabadayı	(Turkey) Gaziantep	Loan	

== Pre-season and friendlies ==
FC Augsburg will be played TSV Gersthofen, SC Lustenau, Memmingen, Essen, Crystal Palace and Sunderland.

12 July 2025 Friendly	TSV Gersthofen	0–9	FC Augsburg	Gersthofen
14:00 CEST (UTC+2)		Report	Tietz 3'; Koudossou 6'; Dong 43'; Bleicher 49'; Dardari 53'; Schnitzer 55', 86'; Hämmerle 60'; Beljo 85'	Stadium: TSV Arena; Attendance: 3,000

18 July 2025 Friendly	Memmingen	1–4	FC Augsburg	Memmingen
17:00 CEST (UTC+2)	Vetter 21'		Mounié 17', 30', 49'; Maier 57'	Stadium: Memminger Arena

19 July 2025 Friendly	Austria Lustenau	0–2	FC Augsburg	Lustenau, Austria
16:00 CEST (UTC+2)				Stadium: Reichshofstadion

25 July 2025 Friendly	Essen	2–1	Augsburg	Essen
15:00 CEST (UTC+2)	Safi 25', 33'	Report	Schlotterbeck 72'	Stadium: Stadion an der Hafenstraße

25 July 2025 Friendly	Essen	1–4	Augsburg	Ulm
17:00 CEST (UTC+2)	Arslan 8'	Report	Essende 57'; Maier 65', 85'; Sorg 70'	Stadium: Donaustadion

1 August 2025 Friendly	Augsburg	1–3	Crystal Palace	Bad Wimsbach-Neydharting, Austria
16:00 CEST (UTC+2)	Tietz 90+1' (pen.)	Report	Mateta 39', 51'; Eze 68'	Stadium: Hofmaninger Stadium

1 August 2025 Friendly	Augsburg	1–0	Crystal Palace	Bad Wimsbach-Neydharting, Austria
18:00 CEST (UTC+2)	Dardari 82'	Report		Stadium: Hofmaninger Stadium; Attendance: 3,000

8 August 2025 Friendly	Augsburg	2–2	Pisa SC	Augsburg, Germany
18:00 CEST (UTC+2)	Mounie 72', 83'	Report	Tramomi 41' (pen.), 68'	Stadium: Paul-Renz-Sportanlage; Attendance: 0 Referee: Felix Wagner

9 August 2025 Friendly	Augsburg	0–1	Sunderland	Augsburg, Germany
15:00 CEST (UTC+2)		Report	Diarra 14'; Mayenda 18'	Stadium: WWK Arena; Attendance: 15,231

3 September 2025 Friendly	Augsburg	1–2	Greuther Fürth	Schwabmünchen
17:00 CEST (UTC+2)	Hofgärtner 75'	Report	Sillah 53'; Higl 61'

8 October 2025 Friendly	Augsburg	1–1	SSV Ulm	Burgau
17:00 CEST (UTC+2)	Tieltz 15'	Report	Roser 39'

== Competitions ==
=== Overall record ===
Competition	First match	Last match	Starting round	Record							
Competition	First match	Last match	Starting round	Pld	W	D	L	GF	GA	GD	Win %
Bundesliga	23 August 2025	16 May 2025	Matchday 1	34	12	7	15	45	61	−16	35.29
DFB-Pokal	16 August 2025	28 October 2025	First round	2	1	0	1	2	1	+1	50.00
Total				36	13	7	16	47	62	−15	36.11

Last updated: 16 May 2026
Source: Soccerway

=== Bundesliga ===
==== League table ====
Pos	Team	Pld	W	D	L	GF	GA	GD	Pts	Qualification or relegation
7	SC Freiburg	34	13	8	13	51	57	−6	47	Qualification for the Conference League play-off round
8	Eintracht Frankfurt	34	11	11	12	61	65	−4	44	
9	FC Augsburg	34	12	7	15	45	61	−16	43	
10	Mainz 05	34	10	10	14	44	53	−9	40	
11	Union Berlin	34	10	9	15	44	58	−14	39	

Source: Bundesliga
Rules for classification: 1) Points; 2) Goal difference; 3) Goals scored; 4) Head-to-head results; 5) Head-to-head away goals scored; 6) Away goals scored; 7) Play-off.
(Rules 4–6 only apply after home and away matches have been played between the tied teams.)

==== Results summary ====
Overall								Home						Away					
Pld	W	D	L	GF	GA	GD	Pts	W	D	L	GF	GA	GD	W	D	L	GF	GA	GD
34	12	7	15	45	61	−16	43	8	5	5	25	28	−3	4	2	10	20	33	−13

Last updated: 16 May 2026.
Source: kicker.de

==== Results by round ====
Round	1	2	3	4	5	6	7	8	9	10	11	12	13	14	15	16	17	18	19	20	21	22	23	24	25	26	27	28	29	30	31	32	33	34
Ground	A	H	A	H	A	H	A	H	A	A	H	A	H	A	H	A	H	H	A	H	A	H	A	H	A	A	H	A	H	A	H	A	H	A
Result	W	L	L	L	L	W	D	L	L	L	W	L	W	L	D	L	D	D	W	W	L	W	W	W	L	L	L	D	D	W	D	W	W	L
Position	3	7	11	16	16	13	13	14	14	15	13	14	15	15	15	15	15	15	12	11	13	11	10	9	9	10	10	11	10	9	9	9	9	9
Points	3	3	3	3	3	6	7	7	7	7	10	10	13	13	14	14	15	16	19	22	22	25	28	31	31	31	31	32	33	36	37	40	43	43

Updated to match(es) played on 16 May 2026. Source: Bundesliga Fixtures & Results
A = Away; H = Home; W = Win; D = Draw; L = Loss

==== Matches ====
The league schedule was released on 27 June 2025.

23 August 2025 1	SC Freiburg	1–3	Augsburg	Freiburg
15:30 CEST (UTC+2)	Grifo 58' (pen.)	Report	Giannoulis 32'; Matsima 42'; Wolf 45+2'	Stadium: Europa-Park Stadion; Attendance: 33,600; Referee: Felix Zwayer

30 August 2025 2	Augsburg	2–3	Bayern Munich	Augsburg
17:30 CEST (UTC+2)	Jakić 53'; Kömür 76'	Report	Gnabry 28'; Díaz 45+4'; Olise 48'	Stadium: WWK Arena; Attendance: 30,660; Referee: Florian Exner

14 September 2025 3	FC St. Pauli	2–1	Augsburg	St. Pauli
15:30 CEST (UTC+2)	Hountodji 45'; Sinani 77'	Report	Rieder 16'	Stadium: Millerntor-Stadion; Attendance: 29,546; Referee: Harm Osmers

20 September 2025 4	Augsburg	1–4	Mainz 05	Augsburg
15:30 CEST (UTC+2)	Essende 83'	Report	Sano 14'; Kohr 26'; Nebel 60'; Sieb 69'	Stadium: WWK Arena; Attendance: 29,000; Referee: Daniel Schlager

27 September 2025 5	1. FC Heidenheim	2–1	Augsburg	Heidenheim
15:30 CEST (UTC+2)	Kaufmann 47'; Conteh 54'	Report	Tietz 90+8'	Stadium: Voith-Arena; Attendance: 15,000; Referee: Tobias Welz

4 October 2025 6	Augsburg	3–1	VfL Wolfsburg	Augsburg
15:30 CEST (UTC+2)	Banks 3'; Kömür 51'; Fellhauer 63'	Report	Daghim 65'	Stadium: WWK Arena; Attendance: 30,000; Referee: Benjamin Brand

18 October 2025 7	1. FC Köln	1–1	Augsburg	Köln
15:30 CEST (UTC+2)	El Mala 76'	Report	Rieder 54' (pen.)	Stadium: RheinEnergieStadion; Attendance: 50,000; Referee: Timo Gerach

25 October 2025 8	Augsburg	0–6	RB Leipzig	Augsburg
15:30 CEST (UTC+2)		Report	Diomande 10'; Rômulo 18'; Nusa 22'; Baumgartner 38'; Ouédraogo 56'; Lukeba 65'	Stadium: WWK Arena; Attendance: 28,600; Referee: Daniel Siebert

31 October 2025 9	Augsburg	0–1	Borussia Dortmund	Augsburg
20:30 CET (UTC+1)		Report	Guirassy 37'	Stadium: WWK Arena; Attendance: 30,660; Referee: Tobias Stieler

9 November 2025 10	VfB Stuttgart	3–2	Augsburg	Stuttgart
17:30 CET (UTC+1)	Mittelstädt 18' (pen.); Undav 39', 80'	Report	Rieder 8'; Massengo 26'	Stadium: MHPArena; Attendance: 58,500; Referee: Harm Osmers

22 November 2025 11	Augsburg	1–0	Hamburger SV	Augsburg
15:30 CET (UTC+1)	Kade 76'	Report		Stadium: WWK Arena; Attendance: 30,660; Referee: Robin Braun

29 November 2025 12	TSG Hoffenheim	3–0	Augsburg	Hoffenheim
15:30 CET (UTC+1)	Touré 16'; Burger 26'; Zesiger 45' (o.g.)	Report		Stadium: Rhein-Neckar-Arena; Attendance: 20,218; Referee: Christian Dingert

6 December 2025 13	Augsburg	2–0	Bayer Leverkusen	Augsburg
15:30 CET (UTC+1)	Giannoulis 6'; Kade 28'			Stadium: WWK Arena; Attendance: 30,000; Referee: Sven Jablonski

13 December 2025 14	Eintracht Frankfurt	1–0	Augsburg	Frankfurt
15:30 CET (UTC+1)	Doan 68'			Stadium: Waldstadion; Attendance: 58,600; Referee: Frank Willenborg

20 December 2025 15	Augsburg	0–0	Werder Bremen	Augsburg
15:30 CET (UTC+1)				Stadium: WWK Arena; Referee: Tobias Welz

11 January 2026 16	Borussia Mönchengladbach	4–0	Augsburg	Mönchengladbach
15:30 CET (UTC+1)	Scally 8'; Diks 20' (pen.); Tabaković 36', 61'			Stadium: Borussia-Park; Referee: Harm Osmers

15 January 2026 17	Augsburg	1–1	Union Berlin	Augsburg
	Claude-Maurice 45+6'	Report	Ljubičić 90+2'	Stadium: WWK Arena; Attendance: 27,267; Referee: Florian Badstübner

18 January 2026 18	Augsburg	2–2	SC Freiburg	Augsburg
	Claude-Maurice 47'; Rexhbeçaj 49'	Report	Suzuki 60'; Matanović 62'	Stadium: WWK Arena; Attendance: 29,160; Referee: Martin Petersen

24 January 2026 19	Bayern Munich	1–2	Augsburg	Munich
15:30 CET (UTC+1)	Ito 23'; Tah (yellow card) 73'	Report	Rexhbecaj (yellow card) 74'; Chaves 75'; Massengo 81'	Stadium: Allianz Arena; Attendance: 75,000; Referee: Florian Exner

31 January 2026 20	Augsburg	2–1	FC St. Pauli	Augsburg
15:30 CET (UTC+1)	Wolf (yellow card) 29'; Gregoritsch 41', 59'; Fellhauer (yellow card) 44'; Banks (yellow card) 69'	Report	Sinani 32' (pen.); Sands (yellow card) 90+1'	Stadium: WWK Arena; Attendance: 30,660; Referee: Sascha Stegemann

7 February 2026 21	Mainz 05	2–0	Augsburg	Mainz
15:30 CET (UTC+1)	Amiri 8' (pen.), 80' (pen.), (yellow card) 81'; Becker (yellow card) 90+2'	Report	Claude-Maurice (yellow card) 60'; Kade (yellow card) 78'	Stadium: Mewa Arena; Attendance: 31,111; Referee: Patrick Ittrich

15 February 2026 22	Augsburg	1–0	1. FC Heidenheim	Augsburg
15:30 CET (UTC+1)	Claude-Maurice 80' (pen.)	Report		Stadium: Augsburg Arena; Attendance: 30,107; Referee: Felix Zwayer

21 February 2026 23	VfL Wolfsburg	2–3	Augsburg	Wolfsburg
15:30 CET (UTC+1)	Gerhardt 41'; Shiogai 71'	Report	Ribeiro (yellow card) 50', (goal) 59'; Schlotterbeck (yellow card) 55'; Jakić (yellow card) 86'; Gregoritsch 87' (pen.), (yellow card) 90+8'; Rexhbeçaj 90+3'	Stadium: Volkswagen Arena; Attendance: 19,631; Referee: Daniel Schlager

27 February 2026 24	Augsburg	2–0	1. FC Köln	Augsburg
20:30 CET (UTC+1)	Massengo (yellow card) 15'; Banks (yellow card) 47'; Ribeiro 55'; Zesiger (yellow card) 66'; Keitel (yellow card) 90+2'; Claude-Maurice 90+5'	Report	Martel (yellow card) 31'	Stadium: WWK Arena; Attendance: 30,660; Referee: Tobias Welz

7 March 2026 25	RB Leipzig	2–1	FC Augsburg	Leipzig
15:30 CET (UTC+1)	Diomande 76'; Chaves 90+2' (o.g.)	Report	Schlotterbeck (penalty missed) 23'; Fellhauer 39'; Banks (yellow card) 62'; Giannoulis (yellow card) 78'	Stadium: Red Bull Arena; Attendance: 41,563; Referee: Martin Petersen

14 March 2026 26	Borussia Dortmund	2–0	FC Augsburg	Dortmund
15:30 CET (UTC+1)	Adeyemi 13'; Reggiani 59'	Report		Stadium: Signal Iduna Park; Attendance: 81,365; Referee: Bastian Dankert

22 March 2026 7	FC Augsburg	2–5	VfB Stuttgart	Augsburg
19:30 CET (UTC+1)	Rieder 57'; Kade 72'; Giannoulis (yellow card) 79'	Report	Undav 12', 58'; Tomás 29'; Nartey 31' (yellow card) 63'; Andrés (yellow card) 68'; Assignon (yellow card) 77'; Demirović 83'	Stadium: WWK Arena; Attendance: 30,660; Referee: Felix Zwayer

4 April 2026 28	Hamburger SV	1–1	Augsburg	Hamburg
15:30 CEST (UTC+2)	Otele (yellow card) 41'; Torunarigha (yellow card) 55'; Königsdörffer 60'; Muheim (red card) 64'	Report	Chaves 22'; Rieder (yellow card) 59'; Zesiger (yellow card) 81'; Schlotterbeck (yellow card) 87'	Stadium: Volksparkstadion; Attendance: 57,000; Referee: Deniz Aytekin

10 April 2026 29	Augsburg	2–2	TSG 1899 Hoffenheim	Augsburg
20:30 CEST (UTC+2)	Claude-Maurice 11'; Gregoritsch 13'; Giannoulis (yellow card) 16'; Zesiger (yellow card) 24'; Chaves (yellow card) 59'; Gouweleeuw (yellow card) 60'; Wolf (yellow card) 65'; Claude-Maurice (penalty missed) 85'	Report	Hranáč 35'; Touré 42'; Promel (yellow card) 54'; Hajdari (yellow card) 63'; Asllani (yellow card) 66'	Stadium: WWK Arena; Attendance: 28,600; Referee: Daniel Schlager

18 April 2026 30	Bayer Leverkusen	1–2	FC Augsburg	Leverkusen
15:30 CEST (UTC+2)	Schick 12'; Quansah (yellow card) 48'; García (yellow card) 86'	Report	Rieder 15', 90+7' (pen.), (yellow card) 52'	Stadium: BayArena; Attendance: 29,282; Referee: Benjamin Brand

25 April 2026 31	FC Augsburg	1–1	Eintracht Frankfurt	Augsburg
15:30 CEST (UTC+2)	Kade 45'; Massengo (yellow card) 70'	Report	Skhiri (yellow card) 7'; Dōan (yellow card) 46', (goal) 66'	Stadium: Augsburg Arena; Attendance: 30,660; Referee: Harm Osmers

2 May 2026 32	Werder Bremen	1–3	Augsburg	Bremen
15:30 CEST (UTC+2)	Schmid 64'; Friedl (yellow card) 76'	Report	Massengo (yellow card) 14'; Kade 24', 45+3'; Jakić 69'	Stadium: Weserstadion; Attendance: 40,000; Referee: Daniel Siebert

9 May 2026 33	Augsburg	3–1	Borussia Mönchengladbach	Augsburg
15:30 CEST (UTC+2)	Gregoritsch 24', 72'; Fellhauer 42'; Wolf (yellow card) 56'; Jakić (yellow card) 61'	Report	Scally (yellow card) 45+3'; Sander (yellow card) 61'; Reyna 90+2'	Stadium: WWK Arena; Attendance: 30,660; Referee: Tobias Reichel

16 May 2026 34	Union Berlin	4–0	Augsburg	Berlin
15:30 CEST (UTC+2)	Ilić 10', 42'; Burke (yellow card) 24'; Trimmel (yellow card) 26'; Schäfer 54'; Kemlein (yellow card) 70'; Jeong Woo-yeong 74'	Report	Massengo (yellow card) 63'	Stadium: Stadion An der Alten Försterei; Attendance: 22,012; Referee: Patrick Ittrich

=== DFB-Pokal ===
17 August 2025 First round	Hallescher FC	0–2	FC Augsburg	Halle an der Saale
18:00 CEST (UTC+2)	Stierlin (yellow card) 38'; Landgraf (yellow card) 62'	Report	Mounie (yellow card) 6', (goal) 52'; Jakić (yellow card) 20'; Tietz (yellow card) 35'; Matsima (yellow card) 75'; Essende 79'	Stadium: Leuna-Chemie-Stadion; Attendance: 14,000; Referee: Tobias Reichel

28 October 2025 Second round	Augsburg	0–1	VfL Bochum	Augsburg
20:45 CET (UTC+1)	Kade (yellow card) 72'	Report	Holtmann 39'; Passlack (yellow card) 86'; Wätjen (yellow card) 90+3'; Horn (yellow card) 90+4'	Stadium: WWK Arena; Attendance: 20,280; Referee: Sascha Stegemann

== Statistics ==
=== Appearances ===
No.	Pos.	Player	Bundesliga	DFB-Pokal	Total
1	GK	(Germany) Finn Dahmen	34+0	1+0	35+0
3	DF	(Denmark) Mads Valentin	1+6	0+0	1+6
4	MF	(France) Han-Noah Massengo	29+4	1+0	30+4
5	DF	(France) Chrislain Matsima	17+1	2+0	19+1
6	DF	(Netherlands) Jeffrey Gouweleeuw	10+1	1+0	11+1
8	MF	(Kosovo) Elvis Rexhbeçaj	10+16	0+0	10+16
9	FW	(Democratic Republic of the Congo) Samuel Essende	2+12	0+2	2+14
11	FW	(Tunisia) Ismaël Gharbi	0+6	1+0	1+6
13	DF	(Greece) Dimitrios Giannoulis	25+2	1+1	26+3
14	MF	(Germany) Yannik Keitel	2+4	0+0	2+4
16	DF	(Switzerland) Cédric Zesiger	20+7	0+1	20+8
17	MF	(Croatia) Kristijan Jakić	18+8	2+0	20+8
19	DF	(Germany) Robin Fellhauer	31+3	1+1	32+4
20	MF	(France) Alexis Claude-Maurice	25+4	0+1	25+5
21	FW	(Portugal) Rodrigo Ribeiro	6+8	0+0	6+8
22	GK	(Croatia) Nediljko Labrović	0+0	1+0	1+0
25	GK	(Germany) Daniel Klein	0+0	0+0	0+0
27	DF	(Germany) Marius Wolf	12+17	2+0	14+17
30	MF	(Germany) Anton Kade	18+10	1+0	19+10
31	DF	(Germany) Keven Schlotterbeck	22+2	2+0	24+2
32	MF	(Switzerland) Fabian Rieder	28+4	1+0	29+4
34	DF	(Brazil) Arthur Chaves	9+2	0+0	9+2
36	MF	(Germany) Mert Kömür	17+11	2+0	19+11
38	FW	(Austria) Michael Gregoritsch	11+6	0+0	11+6
40	DF	(United States) Noahkai Banks	20+3	0+0	20+3
42	MF	(Turkey) Mahmut Küçükşahin	0+0	0+0	0+0

Last updated: 16 May 2026.
Source: FBref.com

=== Goalscorers ===
Rank	No.	Pos.	Player	Bundesliga	DFB-Pokal	Total
1	9	FW	(Austria) Michael Gregoritsch	6	0	6
1	32	MF	(Switzerland) Fabian Rieder	6	0	6
1	30	MF	(Germany) Anton Kade	6	0	6
4	20	MF	(France) Alexis Claude-Maurice	5	0	5
5	19	DF	(Germany) Robin Fellhauer	3	0	3
6	4	MF	(France) Han-Noah Massengo	2	0	2
6	13	DF	(Greece) Dimitris Giannoulis	2	0	2
6	17	MF	(Croatia) Kristijan Jakić	2	0	2
6	36	MF	(Germany) Mert Kömür	2	0	2
6	8	MF	(Kosovo) Elvis Rexhbeçaj	2	0	2
6	35	MF	(Brazil) Arthur Chaves	2	0	2
6	21	FW	(Portugal) Rodrigo	2	0	2
13	9	FW	(Democratic Republic of the Congo) Samuel Essende	1	1	2
14	5	DF	(France) Chrislain Matsima	1	0	1
14	21	FW	(Germany) Philip Tieltz	1	0	1
14	27	MF	(Germany) Marius Wolf	1	0	1
14	40	DF	(United States) Noahkai Banks	1	0	1
19	15	FW	(Benin) Steve Mounie	0	1	1
Total				45	2	47

Last updated: 16 May 2026.
Source: FBref.com

=== Top assists ===
Rank	No.	Pos.	Player	Bundesliga	DFB-Pokal	Total
1	13	DF	(Greece) Dimitris Giannoulis	5	0	5
1	20	FW	(France) Alexis Claude-Maurice	4	0	4
1	36	MF	(Germany) Mert Kömür	4	0	4
4	32	MF	(Switzerland) Fabian Rieder	3	0	3
5	19	DF	(Germany) Robin Fellhauer	2	1	3
6	38	FW	(Austria) Michael Gregoritsch	2	0	2
7	4	MF	(France) Han-Noah Massengo	1	0	1
7	5	DF	(France) Chrislain Matsima	1	0	1
7	17	MF	(Croatia) Kristijan Jakić	1	0	1
7	27	MF	(Germany) Marius Wolf	1	0	1
7	30	FW	(Germany) Marius Bülter	1	0	1
7	31	DF	(Germany) Keven Schlotterbeck	1	0	1
7	40	DF	(United States) Noahkai Banks	1	0	1
14	26	FW	(Germany) Elias Saad	0	1	1
Total				26	2	28

Last updated: 16 May 2026.
Source: FBref.com

=== Clean sheets ===
Rank	No.	Pos.	Player	Bundesliga	DFB-Pokal	Total
1	1	GK	(Germany) Finn Dahmen	5	1	6
Total				5	1	6

Last updated: 16 May 2026.
Source: FBref.com

=== Discipline ===
No.	Pos.	Player	Bundesliga			DFB-Pokal			Total		
No.	Pos.	Player	Yellow card	(yellow card) (yellow-red card)	Red card	Yellow card	(yellow card) (yellow-red card)	Red card	Yellow card	(yellow card) (yellow-red card)	Red card
1	GK	(Germany) Finn Dahmen	1	0	0	0	0	0	1	0	0
3	DF	(Denmark) Mads Valentin	0	0	0	0	0	0	0	0	0
4	MF	(France) Han-Noah Massengo	5	0	0	0	0	0	5	0	0
5	DF	(France) Chrislain Matsima	5	0	0	1	0	0	6	0	0
6	DF	(Netherlands) Jeffrey Gouweleeuw	3	0	0	0	0	0	3	0	0
7	FW	(Germany) Yusuf Kabadayı	0	0	0	0	0	0	0	0	0
8	MF	(Kosovo) Elvis Rexhbeçaj	4	0	0	0	0	0	4	0	0
9	FW	(Democratic Republic of the Congo) Samuel Essende	2	0	0	0	0	0	2	0	0
10	MF	(Germany) Arne Maier	0	0	0	0	0	0	0	0	0
11	DF	(Tunisia) Ismaël Gharbi	1	0	0	0	0	0	1	0	0
13	DF	(Greece) Dimitris Giannoulis	8	0	0	0	0	0	8	0	0
14	MF	(Germany) Yannik Keitel	2	0	0	0	0	0	2	0	0
15	FW	(Benin) Steve Mounié	0	0	0	1	0	0	1	0	0
16	DF	(Switzerland) Cédric Zesiger	7	0	0	0	0	0	7	0	0
17	MF	(Croatia) Kristijan Jakić	5	0	0	1	0	0	6	0	0
19	DF	(Germany) Robin Fellhauer	2	0	0	0	0	0	2	0	0
20	MF	(France) Alexis Claude-Maurice	3	0	0	0	0	0	3	0	0
21	FW	(Germany) Phillip Tietz	2	0	0	1	0	0	3	0	0
22	GK	(Croatia) Nediljko Labrović	0	0	0	0	0	0	0	0	0
25	GK	(Nigeria) Daniel Klein	0	0	0	0	0	0	0	0	0
26	FW	(Tunisia) Elias Saad	1	0	0	0	0	0	1	0	0
27	DF	(Germany) Marius Wolf	4	0	0	0	0	0	4	0	0
28	FW	(Luxembourg) Aiman Dardari	1	0	0	0	0	0	1	0	0
29	FW	(France) Kyliane Dong	0	0	0	0	0	0	0	0	0
30	MF	(Germany) Anton Kade	3	0	0	1	0	0	4	0	0
31	DF	(Germany) Keven Schlotterbeck	8	0	1	0	0	0	8	0	1
32	MF	(Switzerland) Fabian Rieder	4	0	0	0	0	0	4	0	0
35	DF	(Brazil) Arthur Chaves	2	0	0	0	0	0	2	0	0
36	MF	(Germany) Mert Kömür	1	0	0	0	0	0	1	0	0
38	FW	(Austria) Michael Gregoritsch	1	0	0	0	0	0	1	0	0
42	MF	(Turkey) Mahmut Küçükşahin	0	0	0	0	0	0	0	0	0
44	MF	(Germany) Henri Koudossou	0	0	0	0	0	0	0	0	0
47	DF	(United States) Noahkai Banks	8	0	0	0	0	0	8	0	0
–	DF	(Germany) Maximilian Bauer	0	0	0	0	0	0	0	0	0

Last updated: 16 May 2026.
Source: FBref.com
