= List of FC Augsburg seasons =

FC Augsburg, formed on 1 June 1969 when the BC Augsburg and the football department of TSV Schwaben Augsburg merged, is a German football club from Augsburg, Bavaria.

The main reason behind the merger was the decline of both clubs, BCA having been relegated from professional football in 1967 and Schwaben two years later in 1969. The new club was formed with the aim to make a return to the second division Regionalliga Süd but it took until 1973 to achieve this. FCA had an outstanding season in this league in 1973–74, coming close to promotion to the Bundesliga; widely considered to be the greatest performance by the club in the 20th century.

In the years that followed, the club stagnated and existed in the 2. Bundesliga Süd as a lower table side and was relegated from professional football once more in 1979. After a season in the Bayernliga, it returned but missed the cut-off when the new single-division 2. Bundesliga was formed in 1981.

FCA won the league title in the Bayernliga once more in 1982 and returned to the 2. Bundesliga for one more season, missing survival there by only three goals. A 23-year-long stint in amateur football followed. The club had another good season in 1994, winning the league and taking part in the promotion round to the 2. Bundesliga, but failed. Instead, it gained entry to the re-formed Regionalliga Süd that year.

The club's most difficult moment came in 2000, when it was refused a Regionalliga licence and came close to bankruptcy. It recovered, winning the Bayernliga once more in 2002 and continued an upwards trend when it won the Regionalliga in 2006 to return to professional football, where it plays now.

After a successful 2009–10 season, when the club reached the semi-finals of the German Cup for the first time in its history and came third in the 2. Bundesliga, the team achieved even higher in 2010–11, earning promotion to the Bundesliga, where it finished 14th in its inaugural season. In 2012–13 it set a new Bundesliga record when it managed to avoid relegation despite having only accumulated nine points in the first half of the season. In 2014–15 the club played its most successful Bundesliga season, finishing fifth in the league and qualifying for the UEFA Europa League for the first time.

== Key ==
Key to competitions

- Bundesliga (1. BL) – The top-flight of football in Germany, established in 1963.
- 2. Bundesliga (2. BL) – The second division of football in Germany, established in 1974.
- 3. Liga (3. L) – The third division of football in Germany, established in 2008.
- Regionalliga Süd (RLS) – The fourth division of football in Germany, established in 1964 and designated as the fourth tier in 2008.
- Bayernliga (OLB/AOLB/ALB) – A current fifth division of football in Germany, established in 1991.
- DFB-Pokal (DFBP) – The premier knockout cup competition in German football, first contested in 1935.
- UEFA Champions League (UCL) – The premier competition in European football since 1955. It went by the name of European Cup until 1992.
- UEFA Europa League (UEL) – The second-tier competition in European football since 1971. It went by the name of UEFA Cup until 2009.

Key to colors and symbols

1st or W	Winners
2nd or RU	Runners-up
3rd	Third place
↑	Promoted
↓	Relegated
♦	League Golden Boot
Italics	Ongoing competition

Key to league record

- Season = The year and article of the season
- Div = Division/level on pyramid
- League = League name
- Pld = Matches played
- W = Matches won
- D = Matches drawn
- L = Matches lost
- GF = Goals for
- GA = Goals against
- GD = Goal difference
- Pts = Points
- Pos. = League position

Key to cup record

- DNE = Did not enter
- DNQ = Did not qualify
- NH = Competition not held or cancelled
- QR = Qualifying round
- PR = Preliminary round
- GS = Group stage
- R1 = First round
- R2 = Second round
- R3 = Third round
- R4 = Fourth round
- R5 = Fifth round
- Ro16 = Round of 16
- QF = Quarter-finals
- SF = Semi-finals
- F = Final
- RU = Runners-up
- W = Winners

== Seasons ==
The club's seasons since 1969:

Season	League											DFB- Pokal	Continental / Other		Average attendance	Top goalscorer(s)	
Season	Div	League	Pld	W	D	L	GF	GA	GD	Pts	Pos.	DFB- Pokal	Continental / Other		Average attendance	Player(s)	Goals
1969–70	3	ALB	34	20	6	8	71	34	+37	46	4th	DNQ	DNQ			(Germany) Kurt Haseneder	19
1970–71	3	ALB	34	18	8	8	77	41	+36	44	3rd	DNQ	DNQ				
1971–72	3	ALB	34	13	11	10	57	45	+12	37	8th	DNQ	DNQ				
1972–73	3	ALB	34	19	10	5	79	36	+43	48	1st	DNQ	DNQ			(Germany) Meyer	25
1973–74 ^{[D]}	2	RLS	34	20	8	6	79	47	+32	48	1st	DNQ	DNQ			(Germany) Karl Obermeier	25
1974–75	2	2. BL	38	12	12	13	61	63	–2	37	12th	R3	DNQ			(Germany) Helmut Haller (Germany) Wilhelm Hoffmann	9
1975–76	2	2. BL	38	12	8	18	57	56	+1	32	15th	R1	DNQ			(Germany) Wilhelm Hoffmann	11
1976–77	2	2. BL	38	17	6	15	72	73	–1	40	9th	R4	DNQ			(Germany) Harald Aumeier	16
1977–78	2	2. BL	38	12	10	16	57	54	+3	34	14th	R3 ^{[C]}	DNQ			(Germany) Georg Beichle	21
1978–79	2	2. BL	38	11	6	21	55	89	–34	28	18th	R2	DNQ			(Germany) Georg Beichle	12
1979–80 ^{[D]}	3	AOLB	34	20	7	7	70	29	+41	47	1st	R2	DNQ			(Germany) Wolfgang Ruhdorfer	27
1980–81	2	2. BL	38	7	10	21	55	88	–33	24	18th	R3	DNQ			(Germany) Hans Jörg	18
1981–82 ^{[D]}	3	AOLB	38	26	8	4	80	32	+48	60	1st	R1	DNQ			(Germany) Nicolaus Katsaros	14
1982–83	2	2. BL	38	11	10	17	32	54	–22	32	17th	DNQ	DNQ			(Germany) Klaus Perrey	3
1983–84	3	AOLB	38	16	11	11	66	44	+22	43	7th	R2	DNQ			(Germany) Jürgen Kedrusch	16
1984–85	3	AOLB	34	22	5	7	71	36	+35	49	2nd	DNQ	DNQ			(Germany) Hans-Joachim Schnürer	20
1985–86	3	AOLB	34	18	10	6	74	38	+36	46	3rd	DNQ	DNQ			(Germany) Karl-Heinz Riedle	21
1986–87	3	AOLB	36	13	11	12	48	36	+12	37	6th	R2	DNQ				
1987–88	3	AOLB	32	11	11	10	57	40	+17	33	6th	DNQ	DNQ			(Germany) Jürgen Kedrusch	13
1988–89	3	AOLB	32	14	11	7	68	41	+27	39	4th	R1	DNQ				
1989–90	3	AOLB	30	16	7	7	49	33	+16	39	3rd	DNQ	DNQ				
1990–91	3	AOLB	32	13	6	13	51	47	+4	32	8th	DNQ	DNQ				
1991–92	3	AOLB	32	16	8	8	60	42	+18	40	4th	DNQ	DNQ				
1992–93	3	AOLB	32	14	9	9	58	40	+18	37	6th	DNQ	DNQ			(Germany) Christian Radlmaier	18
1993–94 ^{[D]}	3	AOLB	32	23	5	4	70	29	+41	51	1st	QF	DNQ			(Germany) Christian Radlmaier	22
1994–95	3	RLS	34	14	6	14	48	52	–4	34	9th	DNQ	DNQ			(Germany) Franz Becker	11
1995–96	3	RLS	34	11	8	15	42	47	–5	41	11th	DNQ	DNQ			(Germany) Bernhard Weis	11
1996–97	3	RLS	34	9	11	14	46	50	–4	38	11th	DNQ	DNQ			(Germany) Michael Fersch	12
1997–98	3	RLS	32	10	12	10	51	47	+4	42	10th	DNQ	DNQ			(Germany) Dieter Eckstein	21
1998–99	3	RLS	34	10	8	16	42	57	–15	38	14th	DNQ	DNQ			(Turkey) Sercan Güvenisik	10
1999–2000	3	RLS	34	12	10	12	43	43	0	46	8th ^{[F]}	DNQ	DNQ			(Germany) Werner Rank	6
2000–01	4	OLB	38	20	5	13	74	51	+23	65	4th	DNQ	DNQ			(Germany) Oliver Remmert	11
2001–02	4	OLB	36	29	2	5	93	34	+59	89	1st	DNQ	DNQ			(Serbia) Vladimir Manislavić (Georgia (country)) Mikheil Sajaia	23
2002–03	3	RLS	36	17	8	11	55	39	+16	59	3rd	DNQ	DNQ			(Germany) Jörg Reeb	15
2003–04	3	RLS	34	15	7	12	57	41	+16	52	4th	DNQ	DNQ			(Germany) Miguel Coulibaly	10
2004–05	3	RLS	34	17	10	7	62	36	+26	61	4th	DNQ	DNQ			(Germany) Mark Römer	17
2005–06	3	RLS	34	23	7	4	73	26	+47	76	1st	DNQ	DNQ			(Switzerland) Christian Okpala	16
2006–07	2	2. BL	34	14	10	19	43	32	+11	52	7th	R1	DNQ			(Belgium) Axel Lawarée	15
2007–08	2	2. BL	34	10	8	16	39	51	–12	38	14th	R1	DNQ			(Germany) Michael Thurk	5
2008–09	2	2. BL	34	10	10	14	43	46	–3	40	11th	R2	DNQ			(Germany) Michael Thurk	14
2009–10	2	2. BL	34	17	11	6	60	40	+20	62	3rd	SF	DNQ			(Germany) Michael Thurk	23
2010–11	2	2. BL	34	19	8	7	58	27	+31	65	2nd	R3	DNQ			(Angola) Nando Rafael	14
2011–12	1	1. BL	34	8	14	12	36	49	–13	38	14th	R3	DNQ			(Germany) Sascha Mölders (South Korea) Koo Ja-Cheol	5
2012–13	1	1. BL	34	8	9	17	33	51	–18	33	15th	R3	DNQ			(Germany) Sascha Mölders	10
2013–14	1	1. BL	34	15	7	12	47	47	0	52	8th	R3	DNQ			(Germany) André Hahn	12
2014–15	1	1. BL	34	15	4	15	43	43	0	49	5th	R1	DNQ			(Paraguay) Raúl Bobadilla	10
2015–16	1	1. BL	34	9	11	14	42	52	–10	38	12th	QF	UEFA Europa League	Ro32		(South Korea) Koo Ja-cheol	8
2016–17	1	1. BL	34	9	11	14	35	51	–16	38	13th	R2	DNQ			(Turkey) Halil Altıntop	6
2017–18	1	1. BL	34	10	11	13	43	46	–3	41	12th	R1	DNQ			(Austria) Michael Gregoritsch	13
2018–19	1	1. BL	34	8	8	18	51	71	–20	32	15th	QF	DNQ			(Iceland) Alfreð Finnbogason	10
2019–20	1	1. BL	34	9	9	16	45	63	–18	36	15th	R1	DNQ			(Germany) Florian Niederlechner	13
2020–21	1	1. BL	34	10	6	18	36	54	–18	36	13th	R2	DNQ			(Germany) André Hahn	8
2021–22	1	1. BL	34	10	8	16	39	56	–17	38	14th	R2	DNQ			(Austria) Michael Gregoritsch	9
2022–23	1	1. BL	34	9	7	18	42	63	–21	34	15th	R2	DNQ			(Austria) Mërgim Berisha	9
2023–24	1	1. BL	34	10	9	15	50	60	–10	39	11th	R1	DNQ			(Bosnia and Herzegovina) Ermedin Demirović	15
2024–25	1	1. BL	34	11	10	13	35	51	–16	43	12th	QF	DNQ			(France) Alexis Claude-Maurice	9
2025–26	1	1. BL	34	12	7	15	45	61	–16	43	9th	R2	DNQ		29,787	three players	6
Total	–	–	1,976	804	486	684	3,125	2,704	+421	2,491	–	–	–		–	–	–

== Notes ==
A. Commonly referred to as the Bayernliga.
B. Two separate leagues under this name existed, the first from 1963 to 1974 and the second from 1994 to 2012.
C. In 1977–78, both the first and second team of FC Augsburg reached the third round of the German Cup.
D. In 1973–74, 1979–80, 1981–82 and 1993–94, the club remained unbeaten at home.
E. League top scorer.
F. Club was denied a Regionalliga licence and relegated.
G. Until 1995, two points for a win, thereafter three points.
H. The club's first-ever game was a qualifying match to the German Cup, held in Augsburg on 30 July 1969, in front of 13,000. FCA lost 3–0 aet against 1. FC Nürnberg.
