= Daniel Klein (footballer) =

German footballer (born 2001)

Personal information
- Date of birth: 13 March 2001 (age 25)
- Place of birth: Heidelberg, Baden-Württemberg
- Height: 1.93 m (6 ft 4 in)
- Position: Goalkeeper

Team information
- Current team: Aberdeen
- Number: 30

Youth career
- 2013–2014: FC-Astoria Walldorf
- 2014–2021: TSG Hoffenheim

Senior career*
Years	Team	Apps	(Gls)
2019–2021	TSG Hoffenheim II	16	(0)
2021–2025	FC Augsburg II	23	(0)
2021–2026	FC Augsburg	0	(0)
2023–2024	→ SV Sandhausen (loan)	4	(0)
2026–	Aberdeen	0	(0)

International career
2016	Germany U15	1	(0)
2016–2017	Germany U16	2	(0)
2017–2018	Germany U17	5	(0)
2018–2019	Germany U18	3	(0)
2019	Germany U19	2	(0)
- * Club domestic league appearances and goals as of 16 May 2026

Daniel Klein (born 13 March 2001) is a German professional footballer who plays as a goalkeeper for Scottish Premiership club Aberdeen.

== Club career ==
=== Early career ===
Born in Heidelberg, Baden-Württemberg, Germany, Klein joined the academy of FC-Astoria Walldorf before switching to TSG Hoffenheim a year later. In 2019, aged 18, Klein was picked as part of the squad for TSG Hoffenheim II for the upcoming season.

He made no appearance during the 2019–20 season, but debuted the following season. He made 16 league appearance during the 2020–21 season, attracting a transfer from Bundesliga club FC Augsburg.

=== FC Augsburg ===
On 2 July 2021, FC Augsburg signed Klein and immediatiely assigned to the reserve team.

In 2023, Augsburg sent Klein out on a season-long loan to 3. Liga club SV Sandhausen.

On 30 June 2024, Klein signed a contract extension, keeping him at the club until 25 September 2028.

=== Loan to SV Sandhausen ===
Klein went on a season long loan to 3. Liga club SV Sandhausen in 2023. He made four appearances in the league.

== International career ==
Born to a German father and Indonesian mother, Klein is eligible to represent either Germany or Indonesia.

Klein represented Germany at under-15 to under-19 level.

== Personal life ==
Born in Germany, Klein is of Indonesian descent.

== Career statistics ==
As of match played 11 May 2024

Appearances and goals by club, season and competition
Club	Season	League			Cup		Other		Total	
Club	Season	Division	Apps	Goals	Apps	Goals	Apps	Goals	Apps	Goals
TSG Hoffenheim II	2018–19	Regionalliga Südwest	0	0	—		—		27	1
TSG Hoffenheim II	2020–21	Regionalliga Südwest	16	0	—		—		32	0
TSG Hoffenheim II	Total		16	0	—		—		70	1
FC Augsburg II	2021–22	Regionalliga Bayern	12	0	—		—		12	0
FC Augsburg II	2022–23	Regionalliga Bayern	8	0	—		—		8	0
FC Augsburg II	2024–25	Regionalliga Bayern	3	0	—		—		3	0
FC Augsburg II	Total		23	0	—		—		23	0
FC Augsburg	2021–22	Bundesliga	0	0	0	0	—		0	0
FC Augsburg	2022–23	Bundesliga	0	0	0	0	—		0	0
FC Augsburg	2024–25	Bundesliga	0	0	0	0	—		0	0
FC Augsburg	2025–26	Bundesliga	0	0	0	0	—		0	0
FC Augsburg	Total		0	0	0	0	—		0	0
SV Sandhausen (loan)	2023–24	3. Liga	4	0	0	0	—		4	0
Career total			43	0	0	0	0	0	43	0
