= Samuel Essende =

DR Congolese footballer (born 1998)

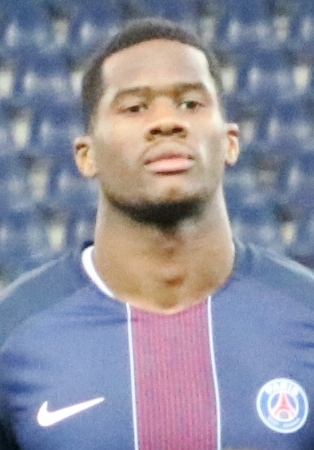
- Essende in 2017

Personal information
- Full name: Samuel Emmanuel Essende Mbongu
- Date of birth: 23 January 1998 (age 28)
- Place of birth: Montfermeil, France
- Height: 1.92 m (6 ft 4 in)
- Position: Striker

Team information
- Current team: Young Boys
- Number: 99

Youth career
- 2010–2016: Paris Saint-Germain

Senior career*
| Years | Team | Apps | (Gls) |
| 2016–2019 | Paris Saint-Germain B | 35 | (5) |
| 2018–2019 | → Eupen (loan) | 16 | (0) |
| 2019–2021 | Avranches | 35 | (7) |
| 2021–2022 | Pau | 32 | (7) |
| 2022–2024 | Caen | 28 | (4) |
| 2023–2024 | → Vizela (loan) | 18 | (9) |
| 2024 | Vizela | 13 | (6) |
| 2024–2026 | FC Augsburg | 44 | (8) |
| 2026– | Young Boys | 27 | (20) |

International career^{‡}
| 2024– | DR Congo | 10 | (1) |
- * Club domestic league appearances and goals as of 18:29, 22 November 2026 (UTC) ‡ National team caps and goals as of 19:14, 2 October 2026 (UTC)

Samuel Emmanuel Essende Mbongu (born 23 January 1998) is a professional footballer who plays as a striker for Swiss Super League club Young Boys. Born in France, he represents the DR Congo national team.

== Club career ==
Essende joined the Paris Saint-Germain Academy at the age of 12, and spent his entire youth footballing career with them. On 10 August 2018, he signed his first professional contract with PSG, keeping him with the club until 1 June 2021.

On 22 August 2018, Essende signed on loan with Eupen in Belgium. He made his professional debut with Eupen in a 1–0 Belgian First Division A win over Mouscron on 25 August 2018.

In August 2019, Essende signed for Championnat National side Avranches.

In 2021, Essende joined Ligue 2 side Pau. On 20 June 2022, Essende signed a contract with Caen until 2025.

On 20 July 2023, Caen sent Essende on a season-long loan to Primeira Liga side Vizela. After he scored 10 goals in 22 appearances in all competitions during the first half of the season, Vizela triggered a buy-clause and permanently signed Essende on contract until June 2026.

On 28 June 2024, Essende signed a four-year deal with Augsburg in Germany. Essende scored a goal and had a second goal disallowed on his Bundesliga debut, a 2–2 draw with Werder Bremen.

On 16 February 2026, Essende joined Swiss Super League club Young Boys.

== International career ==
Essende made his debut for the DR Congo national team on 6 June 2024 in a World Cup qualifier against Senegal at the Diamniadio Olympic Stadium. He played the full match as the game ended in a 1–1 draw.

== Personal life ==
Born in France, Essende holds both French and Congolese nationalities. Growing up, Essende was nicknamed 'Wolf', and idolised Zlatan Ibrahimović.

== Career statistics ==
=== Club ===
As of match played 19 September 2026

Appearances and goals by club, season and competition
| Club | Season | League | | | National cup (Note: Includes Belgian Cup, Coupe de France, Taça de Portugal) | | League cup (Note: Includes Taça da Liga) | | Total | |
| Club | Season | Division | Apps | Goals | Apps | Goals | Apps | Goals | Apps | Goals |
|---|---|---|---|---|---|---|---|---|---|---|
| Paris Saint Germain II | 2015–16 | CFA | 2 | 0 | — | | — | | 2 | 0 |
| Paris Saint Germain II | 2016–17 | CFA | 19 | 2 | — | | — | | 19 | 2 |
| Paris Saint Germain II | 2017–18 | CFA 1 | 14 | 3 | — | | — | | 14 | 3 |
| Paris Saint Germain II | Total | | 35 | 5 | — | | — | | 35 | 5 |
| Eupen (loan) | 2018–19 | Belgian Pro League | 16 | 0 | 3 | 0 | — | | 19 | 0 |
| US Avranches II | 2019–20 | CFA 2 | 3 | 1 | — | | — | | 3 | 1 |
| US Avranches | 2019–20 | Ligue 3 | 18 | 3 | 0 | 0 | — | | 18 | 3 |
| US Avranches | 2020–21 | Ligue 3 | 27 | 8 | 1 | 1 | — | | 28 | 9 |
| US Avranches | Total | | 45 | 11 | 1 | 1 | — | | 46 | 12 |
| Pau FC | 2021–22 | Ligue 2 | 32 | 7 | 1 | 1 | — | | 33 | 8 |
| Caen | 2022–23 | Ligue 2 | 28 | 4 | 2 | 1 | — | | 30 | 5 |
| Caen II | 2022–23 | CFA 1 | 2 | 0 | — | | — | | 2 | 0 |
| Vizela | 2023–24 (Note: Part of this season was spent on loan) | Primeira Liga | 25 | 13 | 3 | 1 | 1 | 0 | 29 | 14 |
| Augsburg | 2024–25 | Bundesliga | 30 | 7 | 4 | 3 | — | | 33 | 10 |
| Augsburg | 2025–26 | Bundesliga | 14 | 1 | 2 | 1 | — | | 16 | 2 |
| Augsburg | Total | | 44 | 8 | 6 | 4 | — | | 49 | 12 |
| Young Boys | 2025–26 | Swiss Super League | 13 | 4 | — | | — | | 13 | 4 |
| Young Boys | 2026–27 | Swiss Super League | 9 | 10 | 1 | 1 | — | | 10 | 11 |
| Young Boys | Total | | 22 | 14 | 1 | 1 | — | | 23 | 15 |
| Career total | | | 251 | 63 | 17 | 9 | 1 | 0 | 269 | 72 |

=== International ===
As of match played 2 October 2026

Appearances and goals by national team and year
| National team | Year | Apps | Goals |
|---|---|---|---|
| DR Congo | 2024 | 6 | 0 |
| DR Congo | 2025 | 3 | 1 |
| DR Congo | 2026 | 1 | 0 |
| Total | | 10 | 1 |

Scores and results list DR Congo's goal tally first, score column indicates score after each Essende goal.

List of international goals scored by Samuel Essende
| No. | Date | Venue | Opponent | Score | Result | Competition |
|---|---|---|---|---|---|---|
| 1 | 5 June 2025 | Stade de la Source, Orléans, France | Mali | 1–0 | 1–0 | Friendly |
