= Fabian Rieder =

Swiss footballer (born 2002)

Personal information
- Full name: Fabian Rieder
- Date of birth: 16 February 2002 (age 24)
- Place of birth: Koppigen, Switzerland
- Height: 1.81 m (5 ft 11 in)
- Position: Attacking midfielder

Team information
- Current team: FC Augsburg
- Number: 32

Youth career
- 2010–2011: Koppiger SV
- 2011–2017: Solothurn
- 2017–2020: Young Boys

Senior career*
Years	Team	Apps	(Gls)
2020–2023	Young Boys	89	(10)
2023–2025	Rennes	18	(1)
2024–2025	→ VfB Stuttgart (loan)	21	(1)
2025–	FC Augsburg	40	(8)

International career^{‡}
2017	Switzerland U16	3	(0)
2018–2019	Switzerland U17	13	(4)
2020	Switzerland U19	1	(0)
2020	Switzerland U20	1	(0)
2021–	Switzerland U21	12	(2)
2022–	Switzerland	38	(2)
- * Club domestic league appearances and goals as of 17:30, 31 October 2026 (UTC) ‡ National team caps and goals as of 23:50, 13 November 2026 (UTC)

Fabian Rieder (born 16 February 2002) is a Swiss professional footballer who plays as an attacking midfielder for Bundesliga club FC Augsburg and the Switzerland national team.

== Club career ==
Born in Koppigen, Rieder is a youth product of the academy of Young Boys. He made his professional debut with Young Boys in a goalless Swiss Super League tie with Servette on 17 October 2020. He made his first Continental appearance with Young Boys in a 2–1 defeat against Roma in the Europa League on 22 October 2020. Rieder played in all six of Young Boys UEFA Champions League group stage matches in the 2021–22 season, scoring his first continental goal in a 1–1 tie against Manchester United at Old Trafford.

On 31 August 2023, Rieder joined French side Rennes for a reported fee of €15 million (including add-ons), signing a four-year contract with the club. On 24 June 2024, he signed a one-year loan contract with Bundesliga club VfB Stuttgart.

On 1 September 2025, Rieder returned to Bundesliga and signed a five-year contract with FC Augsburg.

== International career ==
Rieder played for all Swiss youth national teams before receiving his first call-up for the senior national team for the 2022 FIFA World Cup in Qatar. At said tournament on 25 November, he debuted in a 1–0 victory against Cameroon as a substitute in the 81st minute. Rieder started in the next match against Brazil for the first time.

On 7 June 2024, Rieder was named in Switzerland's squad for UEFA Euro 2024. He played the final four minutes of the team's opening match at the tournament, replacing Dan Ndoye in a 3–1 victory against Hungary in Cologne.

On 20 May 2026, Rieder was selected in the 26-man squad for the 2026 FIFA World Cup.

== Career statistics ==
=== Club ===
As of match played 31 October 2026

Appearances and goals by club, season and competition
Club	Season	League			National cup (Note: Includes Swiss Cup, Coupe de France, DFB-Pokal)		Europe		Total	
Club	Season	Division	Apps	Goals	Apps	Goals	Apps	Goals	Apps	Goals
Young Boys	2020–21	Swiss Super League	23	0	0	0	8 (Note: Appearances in UEFA Europa League)	0	31	0
Young Boys	2021–22	Swiss Super League	30	2	3	2	9 (Note: Appearances in UEFA Champions League)	1	42	5
Young Boys	2022–23	Swiss Super League	33	7	5	2	5 (Note: Appearances in UEFA Europa Conference League)	0	43	9
Young Boys	2023–24	Swiss Super League	3	1	1	0	2	0	6	1
Young Boys	Total		89	10	9	4	24	1	122	15
Rennes	2023–24	Ligue 1	15	1	2	0	4	2	21	3
Rennes	2025–26	Ligue 1	3	0	—		—		3	0
Rennes	Total		18	1	2	0	4	2	24	3
VfB Stuttgart (loan)	2024–25	Bundesliga	21	1	4	0	8	1	33	2
FC Augsburg	2025–26	Bundesliga	32	6	1	0	—		33	6
FC Augsburg	2026–27	Bundesliga	8	2	2	0	—		10	2
FC Augsburg	Total		40	8	3	0	—		43	8
Career total			168	20	18	4	36	4	222	28

=== International ===
As of match played 13 November 2026

Appearances and goals by national team and year
National team	Year	Apps	Goals
Switzerland	2022	2	0
Switzerland	2023	2	0
Switzerland	2024	12	0
Switzerland	2025	9	1
Switzerland	2026	13	1
Total		38	2

Scores and results list Switzerland goal tally first, score column indicates score after each Rieder goal.

List of international goals scored by Fabian Rieder
No.	Date	Venue	Opponent	Score	Result	Competition
1	7 June 2025	Rice–Eccles Stadium, Salt Lake City, United States	Mexico	4–2	4–2	Friendly
2	6 October 2026	Thermoplan Arena, Lucerne, Switzerland	North Macedonia	1–0	3–0	2026–27 UEFA Nations League B

== Honours ==
Young Boys

- Swiss Super League: 2020–21, 2022–23
- Swiss Cup: 2022–23

VfB Stuttgart

- DFB-Pokal: 2024–25

Individual

- Swiss Super League Player of the Year: 2022
- Swiss Super League Team of the Year: 2022–23
