= Noahkai Banks =

Professional footballer (born 2006)

- Banks in 2025

Personal information
- Full name: Noahkai Dominic Banks
- Date of birth: 1 December 2006 (age 19)
- Place of birth: Honolulu, Hawaii, U.S.
- Height: 6 ft 4 in (1.93 m)
- Position: Defender

Team information
- Current team: FC Augsburg
- Number: 40

Youth career
- –2015: TSV Dietmannsried
- 2015–2024: FC Augsburg

Senior career*
Years	Team	Apps	(Gls)
2024–2025	FC Augsburg II	18	(2)
2024–	FC Augsburg	35	(1)

International career^{‡}
2023	United States U17	5	(0)
2024	United States U19	2	(0)
2024	United States U20	5	(0)
2026–	Germany U21	1	(0)
- * Club domestic league appearances and goals as of 19 September 2026 ‡ National team caps and goals as of 30 September 2026

Noahkai Dominic Banks (born 1 December 2006) is a professional footballer who plays as a defender for Bundesliga club FC Augsburg. Born in the United States, he represents Germany at international level.

== Early life ==
Banks was born on 1 December 2006, in Honolulu, Hawaii, United States.

== Club career ==
As a youth player, Banks joined the youth academy of German side TSV Dietmannsried. In 2015, he joined the youth academy of Bundesliga side FC Augsburg at under-10 level and was playing for the club's under-17 team at the age of fourteen. By 2024, he was promoted to FC Augsburg II, the system's professional reserve team, before earning a place on the senior team later that year. On 12 January 2025, he made his senior debut in a 0–1 home loss to VfB Stuttgart in the 2024–25 Bundesliga. Shortly thereafter, American newspaper USA Today wrote that he was "one of the U.S. men's national team's biggest prospects".

In the 2025–26 Bundesliga season, Banks established himself in Augsburg's starting lineup. He also scored his maiden goal for the senior team via a volley in a 3–1 win over VfL Wolfsburg. During a 2–0 home win against 1. FC Köln on matchday 24, Banks was named the player of the match by German football magazine Kicker.

== International career ==
Banks was a youth international for the United States, having been called up to the United States U20s.

In September 2025, Banks was called up to the senior United States squad for a friendly against Japan.

However, on 18 September 2026, Banks filed for a one-time switch to Germany, cap-tying him to the European nation. Later that day, he was called up to the Germany under-21 national team for the 2027 UEFA European Under-21 Championship qualification matches.

== Personal life ==
Banks was born to an American father and German mother, and was therefore eligible to represent either the United States or Germany.

== Career statistics ==
As of 19 September 2026

Appearances and goals by club, season and competition
Club	Season	League			DFB-Pokal		Other		Total	
Club	Season	Division	Apps	Goals	Apps	Goals	Apps	Goals	Apps	Goals
FC Augsburg II	2023–24	Regionalliga Bayern	6	2	—		—		6	2
FC Augsburg II	2024–25	Regionalliga Bayern	11	0	—		—		11	0
FC Augsburg II	Total		17	2	—		—		17	2
FC Augsburg	2024–25	Bundesliga	8	0	—		—		8	0
FC Augsburg	2025–26	Bundesliga	23	0	0	0	—		23	0
FC Augsburg	2026–27	Bundesliga	4	0	1	0	—		5	0
FC Augsburg	Total		35	0	1	0	—		36	0
Career total			51	2	1	0	0	0	52	2
