= Elvis Rexhbeçaj =

Kosovar footballer

Personal information
- Full name: Elvis Rexhbeçaj
- Date of birth: 1 November 1997 (age 29)
- Place of birth: Gjonaj, Prizren, FR Yugoslavia (now Kosovo)
- Height: 1.82 m (6 ft 0 in)
- Position: Defensive midfielder

Team information
- Current team: VfL Wolfsburg
- Number: 37

Youth career
- –2010: Brandenburger SC Süd
- 2010–2016: VfL Wolfsburg

Senior career*
Years	Team	Apps	(Gls)
2016–2019	VfL Wolfsburg II	47	(12)
2017–2022	VfL Wolfsburg	28	(2)
2020–2021	→ 1. FC Köln (loan)	43	(5)
2021–2022	→ VfL Bochum (loan)	32	(0)
2022–2026	Augsburg	109	(5)
2026–	VfL Wolfsburg	4	(0)

International career^{‡}
2024–	Kosovo	19	(2)
- * Club domestic league appearances and goals as of 5 September 2026 ‡ National team caps and goals as of 17:10, 18 November 2026 (UTC)

Elvis Rexhbeçaj (born 1 November 1997) is a Kosovan professional footballer who plays as a defensive midfielder for German 2. Bundesliga club VfL Wolfsburg and the Kosovo national team.

== Club career ==
=== VfL Wolfsburg ===
On 20 August 2017, Rexhbeçaj signed a professional contract with Bundesliga side VfL Wolfsburg. On 28 January 2018, he made his debut in a 1–0 away win against Hannover 96 after coming on as a substitute at 84th minute in place of Daniel Didavi.

==== Loan at 1. FC Köln ====
In January 2020, it was announced that Rexhbeçaj would be loaned to 1. FC Köln until June 2021. The move included an option to remain permanently at the club.

==== Loan at VfL Bochum ====
On 2 August 2021 Rexhbeçaj was loaned to VfL Bochum for the 2021–22 season.

=== FC Augsburg ===
On 27 July 2022, Rexhbeçaj signed a four-year contract with FC Augsburg.

=== Return to VfL Wolfsburg ===
On 22 April 2026, Rexhbeçaj agreed to a four-year deal with VfL Wolfsburg, beginning in the 2026–27 season.

== International career ==
Rexhbeçaj was born in the village of Gjonaj near Prizren and raised in Spremberg and Brandenburg an der Havel by Albanian parents who fled Kosovo during the Kosovo War. In February 2021, he confirmed his desire to represent Germany and stated that he was contacted by Stefan Kuntz as a candidate for the Olympic team for the 2020 Summer Olympics. A month later, there were reports that Rexhbeçaj would switch his allegiance to Albania.

On 13 July 2024, the Football Federation of Kosovo announced that Rexhbeçaj had decided to play for the Kosovo national team, and the delay in his decision was due to the restrictions of the old German nationality law, which did not allow dual citizenship.

On 30 August 2024, he received a call-up from Kosovo for the 2024–25 UEFA Nations League matches against Romania and Cyprus. His debut with Kosovo came seven days later in the 2024–25 UEFA Nations League match against Romania after being named in the starting line-up.

On 20 March 2025, during the first leg of the 2024–25 UEFA Nations League promotion/relegation play-offs in Pristina, he scored his first international goal as Kosovo defeated Iceland 2-1.

== Career statistics ==
=== Club ===
As of match played 5 September 2026

Appearances and goals by club, season and competition
Club	Season	League			DFB Pokal		Europe		Total	
Club	Season	Division	Apps	Goals	Apps	Goals	Apps	Goals	Apps	Goals
VfL Wolfsburg II	2016–17	Regionalliga Nord	17	1	—		—		17	1
VfL Wolfsburg II	2017–18	Regionalliga Nord	24	9	—		—		24	9
VfL Wolfsburg II	2018–19	Regionalliga Nord	3	1	—		—		3	1
VfL Wolfsburg II	2019–20	Regionalliga Nord	3	1	—		—		3	1
VfL Wolfsburg II	Total		47	12	—		—		47	12
VfL Wolfsburg	2017–18	Bundesliga	4	0	0	0	—		4	0
VfL Wolfsburg	2018–19	Bundesliga	24	2	2	0	—		26	2
VfL Wolfsburg	2019–20	Bundesliga	0	0	1	0	1 (Note: Appearance in UEFA Europa League)	0	2	0
VfL Wolfsburg	Total		28	2	3	0	1	0	32	0
1. FC Köln (loan)	2019–20	Bundesliga	13	0	0	0	—		13	0
1. FC Köln (loan)	2020–21	Bundesliga	30	5	3	2	—		33	7
1. FC Köln (loan)	Total		43	5	3	2	—		46	7
VfL Bochum (loan)	2021–22	Bundesliga	32	0	4	0	—		36	0
FC Augsburg	2022–23	Bundesliga	31	0	2	0	—		33	0
FC Augsburg	2023–24	Bundesliga	17	2	1	0	—		18	2
FC Augsburg	2024–25	Bundesliga	27	1	4	1	—		31	2
FC Augsburg	2025–26	Bundesliga	26	2	1	0	—		27	2
FC Augsburg	Total		101	5	8	1	—		109	6
VfL Wolfsburg	2026–27	2. Bundesliga	4	0	1	0	—		5	0
Career total			255	24	19	3	1	0	275	27

=== International ===
As of match played 17 November 2026

Appearances and goals by national team and year
National team	Year	Apps	Goals
Kosovo	2024	5	0
Kosovo	2025	9	2
Kosovo	2026	5	0
Total		19	2

Scores and results list Kosovo's goal tally first, score column indicates score after each Rexhbeçaj goal.

List of international goals scored by Elvis Rexhbeçaj
No.	Date	Venue	Opponent	Score	Result	Competition
1	20 March 2025	Fadil Vokrri Stadium, Pristina, Kosovo	Iceland	2–1	2–1	2024–25 UEFA Nations League promotion/relegation play-offs
2	8 September 2025	Fadil Vokrri Stadium, Pristina, Kosovo	Sweden	1–0	2–0	2026 FIFA World Cup qualification
