= Aiman Dardari =

Luxembourgish footballer

Personal information
- Date of birth: 21 March 2005 (age 21)
- Place of birth: Luxembourg City, Luxembourg
- Height: 1.78 m (5 ft 10 in)
- Position: Winger

Team information
- Current team: Rot-Weiss Essen (on loan from FC Augsburg)
- Number: 7

Youth career
- 2014–2015: Daring Echternach
- 2015–2019: Victoria Rosport
- 2019–2021: F91 Dudelange
- 2021–2023: Mainz 05

Senior career*
Years	Team	Apps	(Gls)
2023–2024	Mainz 05 II	1	(0)
2025–	FC Augsburg II	20	(12)
2025–	FC Augsburg	3	(0)
2026	→ Greuther Fürth (loan)	6	(0)
2026–	→ Rot-Weiss Essen (loan)	0	(0)

International career^{‡}
2023–2024	Luxembourg U19	7	(2)
2024–	Luxembourg U21	2	(0)
2023–	Luxembourg	19	(1)
- * Club domestic league appearances and goals as of 18 May 2026 ‡ National team caps and goals as of 16 November 2026

Aiman Dardari (born 21 March 2005) is a Luxembourgish professional footballer who plays as a winger for 3. Liga club Rot-Weiss Essen, on loan from FC Augsburg, and the Luxembourg national team.

== Club career ==
Dardari is a youth product of the Luxembourgish clubs Daring Echternach, Victoria Rosport, and Dudelange, before moving to the youth academy of the German club Mainz in 2021. He helped the Mainz U19s win the 2022–23 Under 19 Bundesliga, scoring the game-winning goal in the final game on 23 April 2023.

On 13 January 2025, Dardari joined FC Augsburg II.

On 13 August 2025, FC Augsburg signed a four-season contract with Dardari, moving him to the senior squad. On 14 January 2026, Dardari was loaned by Greuther Fürth in the 2. Bundesliga.

On 27 June 2026, Dardari moved on a new loan to 3. Liga club Rot-Weiss Essen.

== International career ==
Born in Luxembourg, Dardari is of Moroccan descent and holds dual Luxembourgish-Moroccan citizenship. He is a youth international for Luxembourg, having played up to the Luxembourg U19s. In September 2023, he was called up to the senior Luxembourg national team for a set of UEFA Euro 2024 qualifying matches. On 8 September 2023, he made his senior debut with Luxembourg in a 3–1 win over Iceland as a late substitute.

== Career statistics ==
=== Club ===
As of match played 20 December 2025

Appearances and goals by club, season and competition
Club	Season	League			National cup		Other		Total	
Club	Season	Division	Apps	Goals	Apps	Goals	Apps	Goals	Apps	Goals
Mainz 05 II	2023–24	Regionalliga Südwest	1	0	—		—		1	0
FC Augsburg II	2024–25	Regionalliga Bayern	12	6	—		—		12	6
FC Augsburg II	2025–26	Regionalliga Bayern	8	6	—		—		8	6
FC Augsburg II	Total		20	12	—		—		20	12
FC Augsburg	2025–26	Bundesliga	3	0	0	0	—		3	0
Career total			24	12	0	0	0	0	24	12

=== International ===
As of match played 16 November 2026

Appearances and goals by national team and year
National team	Year	Apps	Goals
Luxembourg	2023	1	0
Luxembourg	2024	1	0
Luxembourg	2025	8	1
Luxembourg	2026	9	0
Total		19	1

Scores and results list Luxembourg's goal tally first.

List of international goals scored by Aiman Dardari
No.	Date	Venue	Opponent	Score	Result	Competition
1.	4 September 2025	Stade de Luxembourg, Luxembourg City, Luxembourg	Northern Ireland	1–1	1–3	2026 FIFA World Cup qualification
