= Han-Noah Massengo =

French footballer (born 2001)

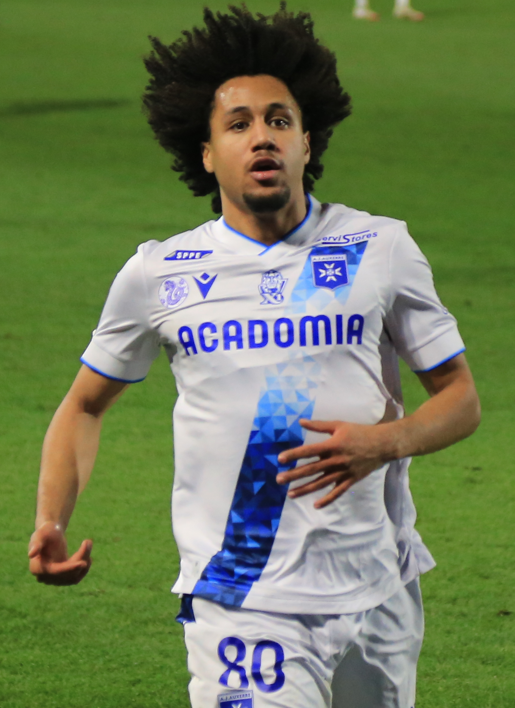
- Massengo with Auxerre in 2025

Personal information
- Full name: Han-Noah Massengo
- Date of birth: 7 July 2001 (age 25)
- Place of birth: Villepinte, France
- Height: 1.75 m (5 ft 9 in)
- Position: Midfielder

Team information
- Current team: FC Augsburg
- Number: 4

Youth career
- 2007–2009: Villepinte FC
- 2010–2011: Sevran FC
- 2011–2014: Espérance Aulneysienne
- 2014–2016: Blanc-Mesnil SF
- 2016–2018: Monaco

Senior career*
Years	Team	Apps	(Gls)
2018–2019	Monaco B	23	(2)
2018–2019	Monaco	3	(0)
2019–2023	Bristol City	99	(0)
2023	→ Auxerre (loan)	14	(0)
2023–2025	Burnley	11	(0)
2025	→ Auxerre (loan)	17	(0)
2025–	FC Augsburg	41	(3)

International career
2018	France U17	3	(0)
2018–2019	France U18	13	(0)
2019	France U19	6	(0)
2023	France U21	2	(0)
- * Club domestic league appearances and goals as of 31 October 2026 (UTC)

Han-Noah Massengo (born 7 July 2001) is a French professional footballer who plays as a midfielder for Bundesliga club FC Augsburg.

== Club career ==
=== Monaco ===
Massengo made his professional debut on 6 November 2018 in the UEFA Champions League group stage against Club Brugge replacing Youssef Aït Bennasser after 68 minutes in a 4–0 home loss. Hence, he became the first player born in the 21st century to play in the Champions League. He made his league debut on 11 November 2018 against Paris Saint-Germain.

=== Bristol City ===
Massengo joined Bristol City on 5 August 2019 for a reported fee of £7.2 million signing a four-year contract with the club. Massengo was brought into the club for the departing skipper Marlon Pack, who would leave on deadline day for Cardiff City.

On 30 January 2023, Massengo joined Auxerre on loan for the remainder of the 2022–23 season. On 30 July 2023, Massengo's contract at Bristol City expired.

=== Burnley ===
On 31 August 2023, Burnley announced the signing of Massengo on a four-year contract. On 7 January 2025, Massengo returned to Auxerre on loan with an option to buy.

=== FC Augsburg ===
On 15 July 2025, Massengo joined Augsburg for an undisclosed fee, signing a long-term contract until 2030. Later that year, on 9 November, he scored his first goal in a 3–2 away defeat against Stuttgart.

== International career ==
Born in France, Massengo is of Congolese descent. He is a youth international for France.

== Career statistics ==
As of match played 31 October 2026

Appearances and goals by club, season and competition
Club	Season	League			National cup (Note: Includes Coupe de France, FA Cup)		League cup (Note: Includes Coupe de la Ligue, EFL Cup)		Europe		Total	
Club	Season	Division	Apps	Goals	Apps	Goals	Apps	Goals	Apps	Goals	Apps	Goals
Monaco	2018–19	Ligue 1	3	0	0	0	1	0	3 (Note: Appearances in the UEFA Champions League)	0	7	0
Bristol City	2019–20	Championship	25	0	1	0	1	0	—		27	0
Bristol City	2020–21	Championship	27	0	3	0	2	0	—		32	0
Bristol City	2021–22	Championship	37	0	1	0	1	0	—		39	0
Bristol City	2022–23	Championship	10	0	0	0	2	0	—		12	0
Bristol City	Total		99	0	5	0	6	0	—		110	0
Auxerre (loan)	2022–23	Ligue 1	14	0	1	0	—		—		15	0
Burnley	2023–24	Premier League	3	0	0	0	1	0	—		4	0
Burnley	2024–25	Championship	8	0	—		1	0	—		9	0
Burnley	Total		11	0	0	0	2	0	—		13	0
Auxerre (loan)	2024–25	Ligue 1	17	0	—		—		—		17	0
FC Augsburg	2025–26	Bundesliga	33	2	1	0	—		—		34	2
FC Augsburg	2026–27	Bundesliga	8	1	2	0	—		—		10	1
FC Augsburg	Total		41	3	3	0	—		—		44	3
Career total			185	3	9	0	9	0	3	0	206	3
