= Kristijan Jakić =

Croatian footballer (born 1997)

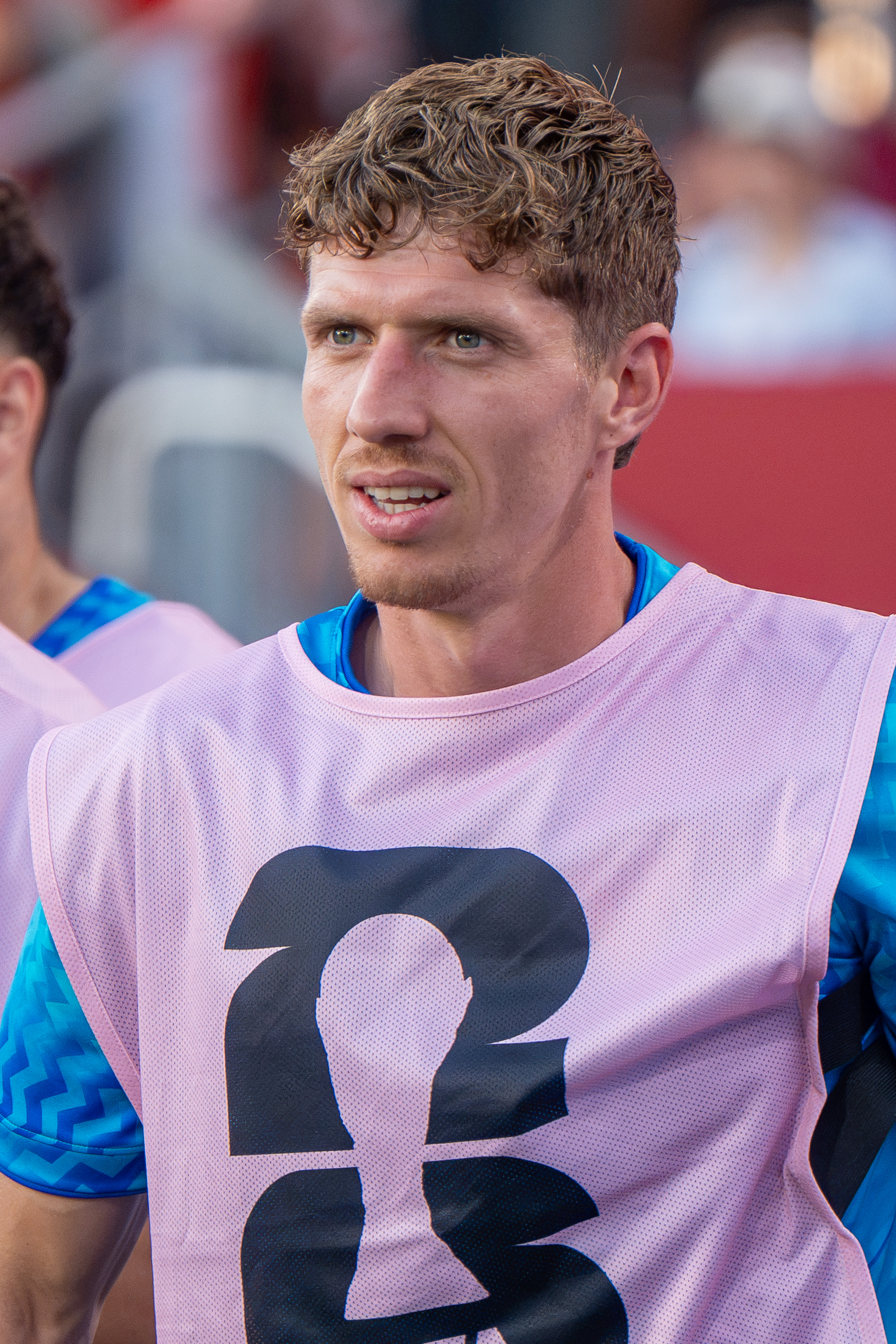
- Jakić with Croatia in 2026

Personal information
- Full name: Kristijan Jakić
- Date of birth: 14 May 1997 (age 29)
- Place of birth: Split, Croatia
- Height: 1.81 m (5 ft 11 in)
- Positions: Defensive midfielder; centre-back; right-back

Team information
- Current team: PAOK (on loan from FC Augsburg)
- Number: 18

Youth career
- 2004–2009: Mračaj Runović
- 2009–2013: Imotski
- 2013–2016: RNK Split

Senior career*
Years	Team	Apps	(Gls)
2015–2017	RNK Split	31	(0)
2017–2020	Lokomotiva	54	(5)
2018	→ Istra 1961 (loan)	13	(0)
2020–2022	Dinamo Zagreb	34	(2)
2021–2022	→ Eintracht Frankfurt (loan)	26	(1)
2022–2024	Eintracht Frankfurt	28	(1)
2024	→ FC Augsburg (loan)	14	(2)
2025–	FC Augsburg	57	(2)
2026–	→ PAOK (loan)	2	(0)

International career^{‡}
2015–2016	Croatia U19	7	(0)
2018	Croatia U20	1	(0)
2021–	Croatia	19	(2)
Medal record
Men's football
Representing Croatia
FIFA World Cup
Third place	2022 Qatar
- * Club domestic league appearances and goals as of 23:30, 20 September 2026 (UTC) ‡ National team caps and goals as of 18:18, 7 October 2026 (UTC)

Kristijan Jakić (born 14 May 1997) is a Croatian professional footballer who plays as a defensive midfielder, and can play as a centre-back and right-back for Super League Greece club PAOK, on loan from Bundesliga club FC Augsburg, and the Croatia national team.

== Club career ==
=== Early career and RNK Split ===
A native of Runovići, Jakić started training at the age of seven at the local NK Mračaj Runović. Later, he moved to the nearby Imotski, spending four seasons and qualifying for the Croatian Academy Football League in 2013. However, Jakić moved to the RNK Split academy that summer. He debuted for the Croatia U19 team in 2015 before moving to RNK Split senior team in a 1–1 home draw against Osijek, coming as a substitute in the 66th minute for Miloš Vidović.

=== Istra 1961 and Lokomotiva ===
In May 2017, following the relegation of RNK Split, Jakić moved to Lokomotiva. After struggling during his first half-season at the club, he requested a loan move to Istra 1961 from club's director of football Božidar Šikić. Jakić spent the second half of the 2017–18 season in Pula, where he regained form by Istra coach Darko Raić-Sudar. He returned to Lokomotiva at the end of the season, where he turned into one of the best players during coach Goran Tomić's tenure at the club.

=== Dinamo Zagreb ===
His good performances for Lokomotiva drew attention from Croatian club Dinamo Zagreb, who signed him for €1.2 million on 24 July 2020. Jakić was forced to miss the beginning of the season due to the COVID-19 pandemic. He made his Dinamo debut on 12 September in a 2–1 victory against Hajduk Split. In his Europa League debut in a goalless draw against Feyenoord on 22 October, Jakić fouled Mark Diemers and caused a penalty, which Dinamo goalkeeper Dominik Livaković saved. On 8 November, he scored his first goal for Dinamo Zagreb in a 5–0 victory against Istra 1961. By the end of the first half-season, Jakić had already established himself as the important part of Dinamo Zagreb's starting lineup.

On 20 July 2021, in Dinamo Zagreb's Champions League second qualifying round against Omonia, Jakić assisted Lovro Majer and scored himself as Dinamo Zagreb won 2–0. Ahead of Dinamo Zagreb's Champions League play-off against Sheriff Tiraspol on 25 August, Jakić was dropped from the squad, with coach Damir Krznar claiming he had injured his ankle in the 1–0 league victory over Lokomotiva the weekend before. However, Sportske novosti published that Jakić was removed from the squad as a disciplinary measure after he was dissatisfied by the club refusing Eintracht Frankfurt's offer to buy him. He was unexpectedly named in the starting lineup in the 29 August league derby against Osijek, and scored the opener as Dinamo won 2–0.

=== Eintracht Frankfurt ===
On 30 August 2021, Jakić officially moved to German side Eintracht Frankfurt on loan with an option to buy at the end of the season. He made his Bundesliga debut on 12 September in a 1–1 draw against VfB Stuttgart, coming off the bench for Ajdin Hrustić. He scored his first goal for Eintracht on 12 December in a 5–2 victory against Bayer Leverkusen. Despite Eintracht Frankfurt's underwhelming performance in the league where they finished eleventh, Jakić helped the club reach the Europa League final unbeaten, eliminating Barcelona in the process, where they defeated Rangers 5–4 on penalties.

On 29 May 2022, the transfer was made permanent and Jakić signed a four-year contract with Frankfurt.

=== FC Augsburg ===
On 19 January 2024, Jakić moved to fellow Bundesliga club FC Augsburg on loan for the remainder of the 2023–24 season, with an option to buy if obligations were met. On 24 May 2024, he signed for the club permanently on a four-year contract until June 2028.

==== Loan to PAOK ====
On 9 September 2026, Jakić moved on loan to Super League Greece club PAOK.

== International career ==
Jakić received his first call-up to the Croatia national team on 20 September 2021, when coach Zlatko Dalić called him up for the October World Cup qualifiers against Cyprus and Slovakia. He made his debut on 8 October against the former opponent, being replaced in the 84th minute; the match ended in a 3–0 victory for the Croats.

On 18 May 2026, Jakić was selected in the 26-man squad for the 2026 FIFA World Cup.

== Career statistics ==
=== Club ===
As of match played 22 August 2026

Appearances and goals by club, season and competition
Club	Season	League			National cup		Europe		Other		Total	
Club	Season	Division	Apps	Goals	Apps	Goals	Apps	Goals	Apps	Goals	Apps	Goals
RNK Split	2015–16	Prva HNL	7	0	0	0	—		—		7	0
RNK Split	2016–17	Prva HNL	24	0	3	0	—		—		27	0
RNK Split	Total		31	0	3	0	—		—		34	0
Lokomotiva	2017–18	Prva HNL	2	0	1	0	—		—		3	0
Lokomotiva	2018–19	Prva HNL	25	1	2	0	—		—		27	1
Lokomotiva	2019–20	Prva HNL	27	4	2	0	—		—		29	4
Lokomotiva	Total		54	5	5	0	—		—		59	5
Istra 1961 (loan)	2017–18	Prva HNL	13	0	0	0	—		2 (Note: Appearances in Prva HNL relegation play-offs)	0	15	0
Dinamo Zagreb	2020–21	Prva HNL	29	1	3	1	14 (Note: One appearance in UEFA Champions League, thirteen appearances in UEFA Europa League)	0	—		46	2
Dinamo Zagreb	2021–22	Prva HNL	5	1	0	0	7 (Note: Appearances in UEFA Champions League)	1	—		12	2
Dinamo Zagreb	Total		34	2	3	1	21	1	—		58	4
Eintracht Frankfurt (loan)	2021–22	Bundesliga	26	1	0	0	12 (Note: Appearances in UEFA Europa League)	0	—		38	1
Eintracht Frankfurt	2022–23	Bundesliga	24	1	4	2	8	0	0	0	36	3
Eintracht Frankfurt	2023–24	Bundesliga	4	0	0	0	4 (Note: Appearances in UEFA Europa Conference League)	0	—		8	0
Eintracht Frankfurt	Frankfurt total		54	2	4	2	24	0	0	0	82	4
FC Augsburg (loan)	2023–24	Bundesliga	14	2	—		—		—		14	2
FC Augsburg	2024–25	Bundesliga	31	0	4	0	—		—		35	0
FC Augsburg	2025–26	Bundesliga	26	2	2	0	—		—		28	2
FC Augsburg	2025–26	Bundesliga	0	0	1	1	—		—		1	1
FC Augsburg	Augsburg total		71	4	7	1	—		—		78	5
Career total			257	13	22	4	45	1	2	0	326	18

=== International ===
As of match played 6 October 2026

Appearances and goals by national team and year
National team	Year	Apps	Goals
Croatia	2021	2	0
Croatia	2022	3	0
Croatia	2023	0	0
Croatia	2024	4	0
Croatia	2025	6	2
Croatia	2026	4	0
Total		19	2

Scores and results list Croatia goal tally first, score column indicates score after each Jakić goal

List of international goals scored by Kristijan Jakić
No.	Date	Venue	Opponent	Score	Result	Competition
1	8 September 2025	Stadion Maksimir, Zagreb, Croatia	Montenegro	1–0	4–0	2026 FIFA World Cup qualification
2	17 November 2025	Podgorica City Stadium, Podgorica, Montenegro	Montenegro	2–2	3–2	2026 FIFA World Cup qualification

== Honours ==
Dinamo Zagreb

- Prva HNL: 2020–21
- Croatian Cup: 2020–21

Eintracht Frankfurt

- UEFA Europa League: 2021–22

Croatia

- FIFA World Cup third place: 2022
