= Chrislain Matsima =

French footballer (born 2002)

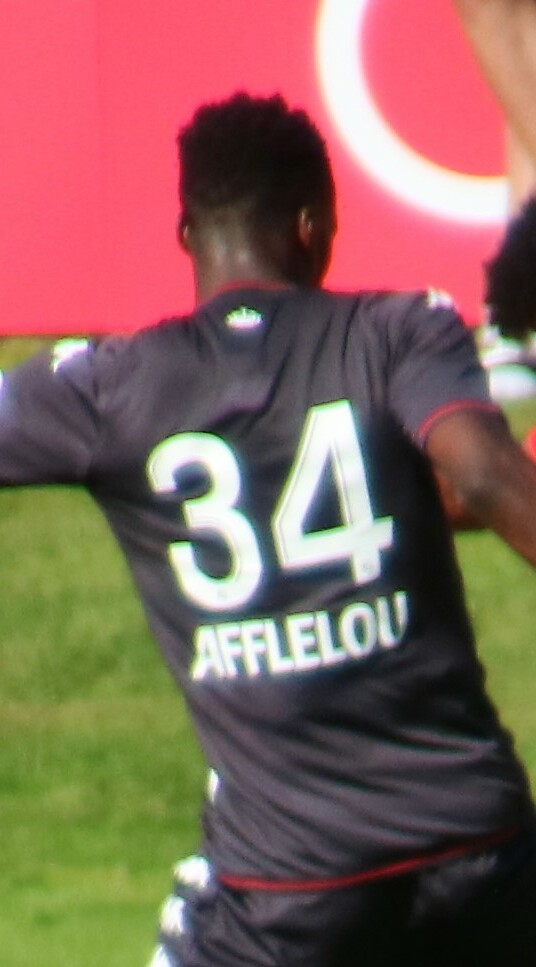
- Matsima playing for Monaco in 2021

Personal information
- Full name: Chrislain Iris Aurel Matsima
- Date of birth: 15 May 2002 (age 24)
- Place of birth: Nanterre, Hauts-de-Seine, France
- Height: 1.93 m (6 ft 4 in)
- Position: Centre-back

Team information
- Current team: FC Augsburg
- Number: 5

Youth career
- 2009–2013: Nanterre
- 2013–2014: Garenne-Colombes
- 2014–2017: RCFF
- 2017–2020: Monaco

Senior career*
Years	Team	Apps	(Gls)
2019–2020	Monaco II	17	(1)
2020–2025	Monaco	30	(0)
2022–2023	→ Lorient (loan)	6	(0)
2022–2023	→ Lorient II (loan)	1	(0)
2024	→ Clermont (loan)	14	(1)
2024–2025	→ FC Augsburg (loan)	30	(1)
2025–	FC Augsburg	26	(1)

International career^{‡}
2018	France U16	8	(0)
2018–2019	France U17	15	(0)
2019–2020	France U18	12	(1)
2021–2022	France U20	10	(0)
2023–2025	France U21	13	(1)
2024	France Olympic	3	(0)
Medal record
Men's football
Representing France
Olympic Games
Silver medal – second place	Paris 2024	Team
UEFA European Under-17 Championship
Bronze medal – third place	2019
- * Club domestic league appearances and goals as of 17:30, 31 October 2026 (UTC) ‡ National team caps and goals as of 25 June 2025

Chrislain Iris Aurel Matsima (born 15 May 2002) is a French professional footballer who plays as a centre-back for Bundesliga club FC Augsburg.

== Club career ==
=== Monaco ===
Matsima made his professional debut for Monaco on 27 September 2020 in a Ligue 1 game against Strasbourg.

=== FC Lorient (loan) ===
On 16 August 2022, Matsima joined Lorient on loan with an option to buy. On 31 January 2023, the loan was terminated early.

=== Clermont (loan) ===
On 1 February 2024, Matsima moved on loan to Clermont.

=== FC Augsburg ===
On 30 August 2024, Matsima joined German club FC Augsburg on a season-long loan with a buy option. On 30 January 2025, Augsburg exercised their option to buy and signed a contract with Matsima until 2029.

== Personal life ==
Born in France, Matsima is of Congolese descent from the Republic of the Congo.

== Career statistics ==
As of match played 31 October 2026

Appearances and goals by club, season and competition
Club	Season	League			National cup		Europe		Total	
Club	Season	Division	Apps	Goals	Apps	Goals	Apps	Goals	Apps	Goals
Monaco II	2019–20	CFA 2	17	1	—		—		17	1
Monaco	2020–21	Ligue 1	9	0	2	0	—		11	0
Monaco	2021–22	Ligue 1	7	0	3	0	3 (Note: Appearances in UEFA Europa League)	0	13	0
Monaco	2022–23	Ligue 1	8	0	0	0	2	0	10	0
Monaco	2023–24	Ligue 1	6	0	1	0	—		7	0
Monaco	Total		30	0	6	0	5	0	41	0
Lorient (loan)	2022–23	Ligue 1	6	0	2	0	—		8	0
Lorient II (loan)	2022–23	CFA 2	1	0	—		—		1	0
Clermont (loan)	2023–24	Ligue 1	14	1	0	0	—		14	1
FC Augsburg II (loan)	2024–25	Regionalliga Bayern	1	0	—		—		1	0
Augsburg (loan)	2024–25	Bundesliga	30	1	3	0	—		33	1
Augsburg	2025–26	Bundesliga	18	1	2	0	—		20	1
Augsburg	2026–27	Bundesliga	8	0	2	0	—		10	0
Augsburg	Total		26	1	4	0	—		30	1
Career total			125	4	15	0	5	0	145	4

== Honours ==
France U23

- Summer Olympics silver medal: 2024

Individual

- Bundesliga Rookie of the Month: January 2025, March 2025
