= Marius Wolf =

German footballer (born 1995)

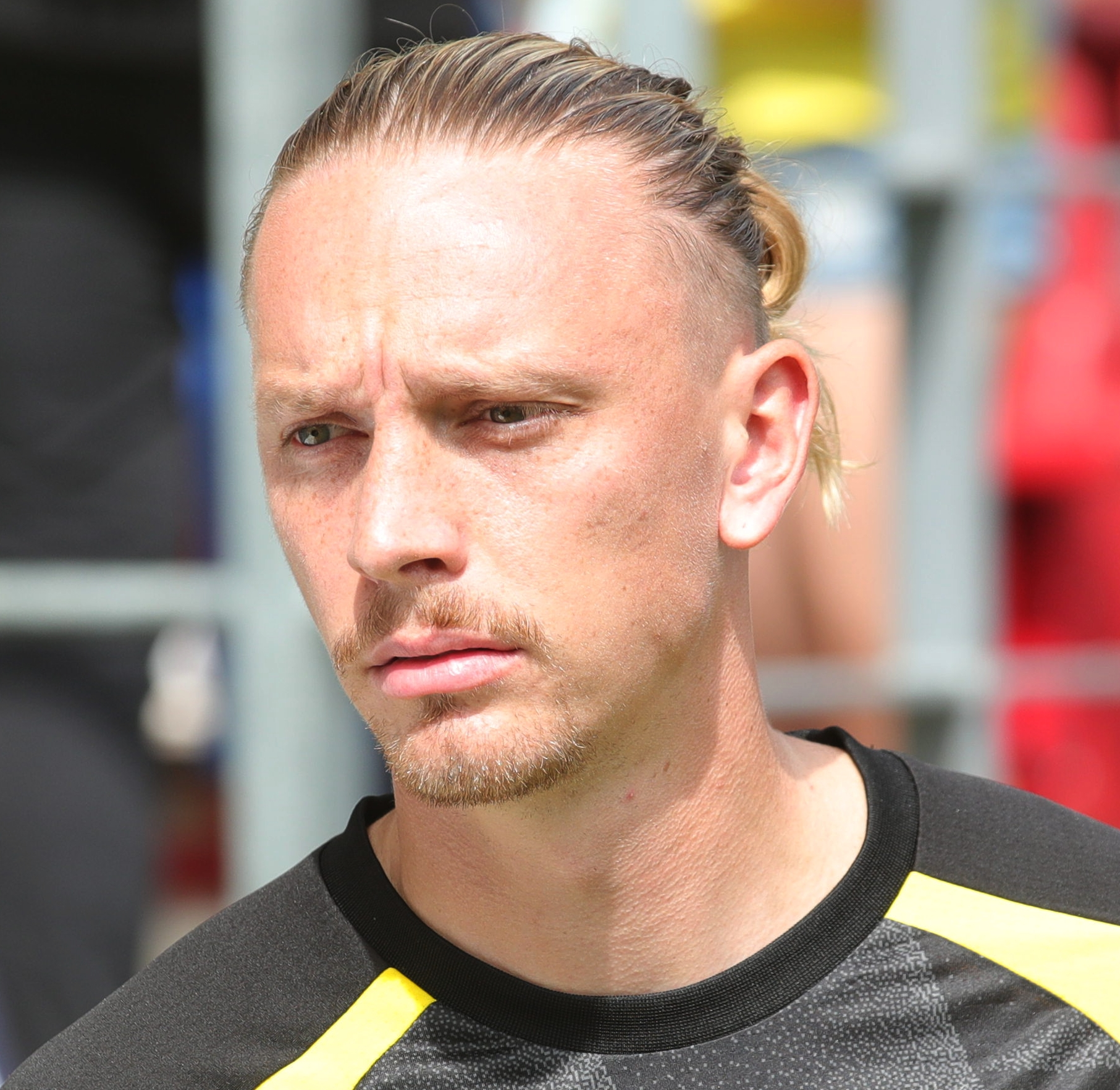
- Wolf with Borussia Dortmund in 2023

Personal information
- Date of birth: 27 May 1995 (age 31)
- Place of birth: Kronach, Germany
- Height: 1.88 m (6 ft 2 in)
- Positions: Wing-back; right-back; winger

Team information
- Current team: FC Augsburg
- Number: 27

Youth career
- 1998–2004: VfB Einberg
- 2004–2006: JFG Rödental
- 2006–2007: DTFS
- 2008–2012: 1. FC Nürnberg
- 2012–2014: 1860 Munich

Senior career*
Years	Team	Apps	(Gls)
2014–2015	1860 Munich II	10	(3)
2014–2016	1860 Munich	39	(5)
2016–2018	Hannover 96	2	(0)
2016	Hannover 96 II	15	(2)
2017–2018	→ Eintracht Frankfurt (loan)	31	(5)
2018–2024	Borussia Dortmund	90	(5)
2019–2020	→ Hertha BSC (loan)	21	(1)
2020–2021	→ 1. FC Köln (loan)	31	(2)
2024–	FC Augsburg	68	(2)

International career^{‡}
2015	Germany U20	1	(0)
2023	Germany	5	(0)
- * Club domestic league appearances and goals as of 17:30, 31 October 2026 (UTC) ‡ National team caps and goals as of 16:20, 21 June 2023 (UTC)

Marius Wolf (born 27 May 1995) is a German professional footballer who plays as a right wing-back for Bundesliga club FC Augsburg.

== Club career ==
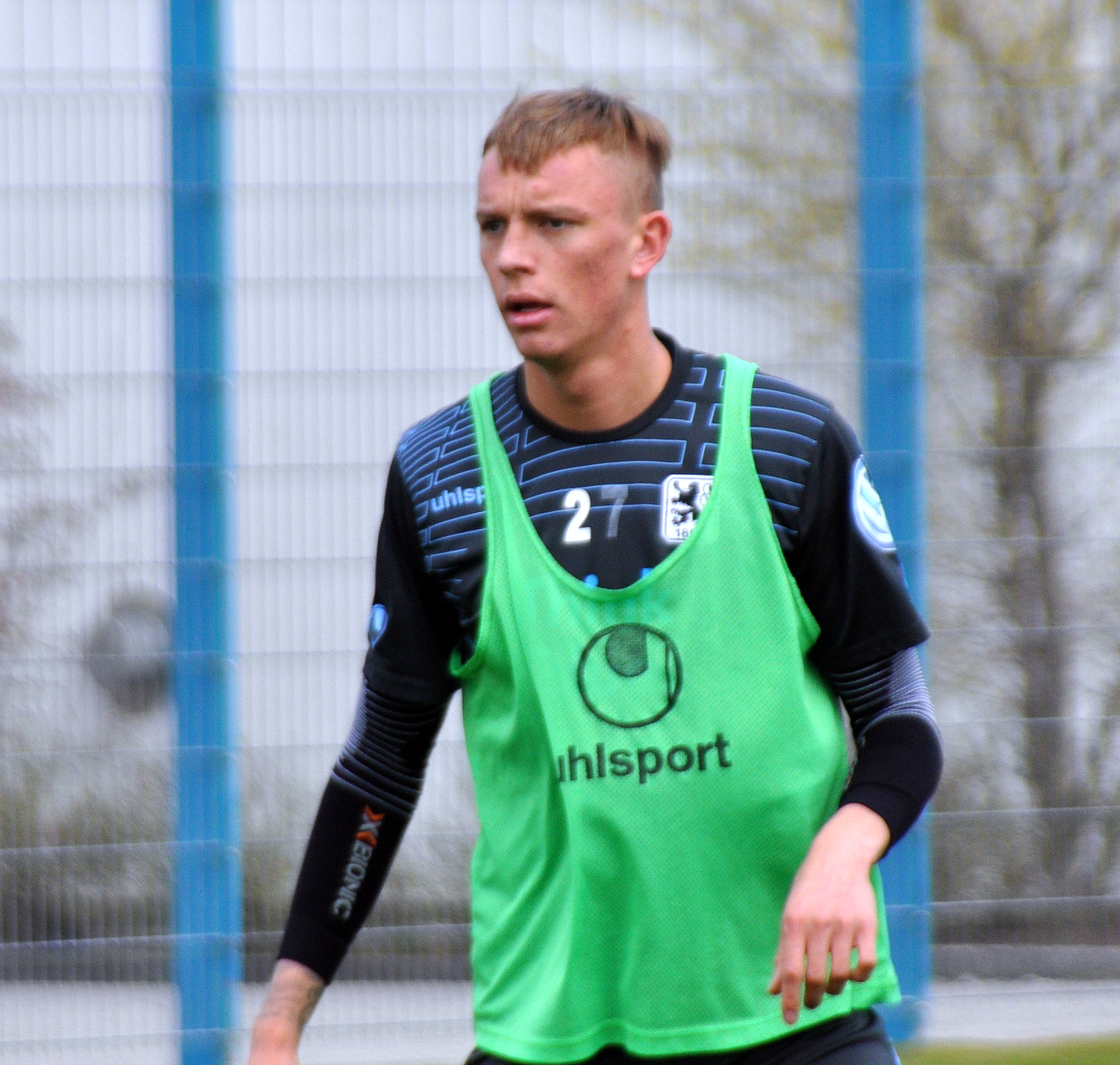
Wolf with 1860 Munich in 2015

Wolf is a youth exponent from 1860 Munich. He made his 2. Bundesliga debut on 26 October 2014 against Braunschweig in a 2–1 home defeat, being substituted for Valdet Rama in the 72nd minute. On 21 February 2015, Wolf scored his first professional goal in a 2–1 home win against St. Pauli, when he brought his team to a 2–0 lead assisted by Daniel Adlung. He moved to Hannover 96 on 8 January 2016.

He was loaned by Hannover to Eintracht Frankfurt in January 2017. His loan contract was extended for the 2017–18 Bundesliga season. In January 2018, Eintracht Frankfurt exercised the option to sign him permanently and he signed a contract until June 2020.

On 28 May 2018, Wolf joined Borussia Dortmund on a five-year deal for a reported fee of €5 million. On 18 September, he made his Champions League debut in a 1–0 away win over Club Brugge during the 2018–19 season.

On 2 September 2019, Wolf was loaned out to Hertha BSC for the 2019–20 season. On 2 October 2020, he joined 1. FC Köln on loan for the 2020–21 season. Wolf later returned to his parent club, Borussia Dortmund, and started playing as a full-back or wing-back. On 18 May 2024, Borussia Dortmund announced that Wolf will leave the club after the season.

On 8 August 2024, Wolf signed a three-year contract with FC Augsburg.

== International career ==
On 12 November 2015, Wolf played one match for Germany U20 in a 2–0 defeat against Italy U20 during the Four Nations Tournament.

On 17 March 2023, he received his first official call-up to the German senior national team for the friendlies against Peru and Belgium.

== Career statistics ==
=== Club ===
As of match played 31 October 2026

Appearances and goals by club, season and competition
Club	Season	League			DFB-Pokal		Europe		Other		Total	
Club	Season	Division	Apps	Goals	Apps	Goals	Apps	Goals	Apps	Goals	Apps	Goals
1860 Munich II	2014–15	Regionalliga Bayern	10	3	—		—		—		10	3
1860 Munich	2014–15	2. Bundesliga	23	2	1	0	—		2 (Note: Appearances in Bundesliga relegation play-offs)	0	26	2
1860 Munich	2015–16	2. Bundesliga	16	3	2	0	—		—		18	3
1860 Munich	Total		39	5	3	0	—		2	0	44	5
Hannover 96	2015–16	Bundesliga	2	0	—		—		—		2	0
Hannover 96 II	2015–16	Regionalliga Nord	6	1	—		—		—		6	1
Hannover 96 II	2016–17	Regionalliga Nord	9	1	—		—		—		9	1
Hannover 96 II	Total		15	2	—		—		—		15	2
Eintracht Frankfurt (loan)	2016–17	Bundesliga	3	0	1	0	—		—		4	0
Eintracht Frankfurt (loan)	2017–18	Bundesliga	28	5	6	1	—		—		34	6
Eintracht Frankfurt (loan)	Total		31	5	7	1	—		—		38	6
Borussia Dortmund	2018–19	Bundesliga	16	1	2	0	4 (Note: Appearances in UEFA Champions League)	0	–		22	1
Borussia Dortmund	2019–20	Bundesliga	0	0	0	0	0	0	1 (Note: Appearance in DFL-Supercup)	0	1	0
Borussia Dortmund	2021–22	Bundesliga	27	3	1	0	6 (Note: Five appearances in UEFA Champions League and one appearance in UEFA Europa League)	0	1	0	35	3
Borussia Dortmund	2022–23	Bundesliga	25	1	3	0	4	0	—		32	1
Borussia Dortmund	2023–24	Bundesliga	22	0	3	0	6	0	—		31	0
Borussia Dortmund	Total		90	5	9	1	20	0	2	0	121	5
Hertha BSC (loan)	2019–20	Bundesliga	21	1	2	0	—		—		23	1
1. FC Köln (loan)	2020–21	Bundesliga	31	2	2	0	—		2	0	35	2
Augsburg	2024–25	Bundesliga	32	1	4	0	—		—		36	1
Augsburg	2025–26	Bundesliga	29	1	2	0	—		—		31	1
Augsburg	2026–27	Bundesliga	7	0	1	0	—		—		8	0
Augsburg	Total		69	2	7	0	—		—		75	2
Career total			307	25	30	1	20	0	6	0	363	26

=== International ===
As of match played 20 June 2023

Appearances and goals by national team and year
National team	Year	Apps	Goals
Germany	2023	5	0
Total		5	0

== Honours ==
Eintracht Frankfurt

- DFB-Pokal: 2017–18

Borussia Dortmund

- DFL-Supercup: 2019
