= Cédric Zesiger =

Swiss footballer (born 1998)

Personal information
- Full name: Cedric Adrian Zesiger
- Date of birth: 24 June 1998 (age 28)
- Place of birth: Meyriez, Switzerland
- Height: 1.94 m (6 ft 4 in)
- Position: Centre back

Team information
- Current team: Young Boys
- Number: 15

Youth career
- 2006–2009: FC Müntschemier
- 2009–2011: FC Xamax 2007
- 2011–2015: Neuchâtel Xamax

Senior career*
Years	Team	Apps	(Gls)
2015–2016	Neuchâtel Xamax	32	(0)
2016–2019	Grasshoppers	46	(2)
2019–2023	Young Boys	102	(4)
2023–2025	VfL Wolfsburg	30	(0)
2025	→ FC Augsburg (loan)	15	(0)
2025–2026	FC Augsburg	27	(0)
2026–	Young Boys	3	(1)

International career^{‡}
2015–2016	Switzerland U18	4	(0)
2016	Switzerland U19	6	(0)
2017–2019	Switzerland U20	7	(0)
2017–2021	Switzerland U21	17	(0)
2021–	Switzerland	6	(0)
- * Club domestic league appearances and goals as of 23:15, 10 August 2026 (UTC) ‡ National team caps and goals as of 23:59, 7 June 2025 (UTC)

Cédric Adrian Zesiger (born 24 June 1998) is a Swiss professional footballer who plays as a centre back for Swiss Super League club Young Boys and the Switzerland national team. He has also played for the Switzerland U21, U20, U19 and U18 teams.

== Club career ==
On 29 June 2019, it was confirmed that Zesiger had signed a four-year contract with Young Boys.

On 3 May 2023, Zesiger agreed to join Bundesliga club VfL Wolfsburg on a four-year contract when the transfer window opened.

On 14 January 2025, Zesiger joined Augsburg on loan with an option to buy. On 27 May 2025, Augsburg exercised their option to buy and signed a four-year contract with Zesiger.

On 3 July 2026, Zesiger returned to Young Boys and signed a five-season contract.

== International career ==
Zesiger made his debut for the Switzerland national team on 1 September 2021 in a friendly against Greece. He played the full match in a 2–1 home victory.

== Career statistics ==
=== Club ===
As of match played 8 August 2026

Appearances and goals by club, season and competition
Club	Season	League			National cup		Europe		Other		Total	
Club	Season	Division	Apps	Goals	Apps	Goals	Apps	Goals	Apps	Goals	Apps	Goals
Neuchâtel Xamax	2015–16	Swiss Challenge League	26	0	1	1	—		—		27	1
Neuchâtel Xamax	2016–17	Swiss Challenge League	6	0	1	0	—		—		7	0
Neuchâtel Xamax	Total		32	0	2	1	—		—		34	1
Grasshoppers	2016–17	Swiss Super League	7	0	2	0	—		—		9	0
Grasshoppers	2017–18	Swiss Super League	18	1	3	0	—		—		21	1
Grasshoppers	2018–19	Swiss Super League	21	1	2	0	—		—		23	1
Grasshoppers	Total		46	2	7	0	—		—		53	2
Young Boys	2019–20	Swiss Super League	23	2	5	0	7	0	—		35	2
Young Boys	2020–21	Swiss Super League	28	0	0	0	7	0	—		35	0
Young Boys	2021–22	Swiss Super League	20	0	2	1	6	1	—		28	2
Young Boys	2022–23	Swiss Super League	31	2	5	0	5	0	—		41	2
Young Boys	Total		102	4	12	1	25	1	—		139	6
VfL Wolfsburg	2023–24	Bundesliga	23	0	3	0	—		—		26	0
VfL Wolfsburg	2024–25	Bundesliga	7	0	1	0	—		—		8	0
VfL Wolfsburg	Total		30	0	4	0	—		—		34	0
FC Augsburg (loan)	2024–25	Bundesliga	15	0	—		—		—		15	0
FC Augsburg	2025–26	Bundesliga	27	0	2	0	—		—		29	0
FC Augsburg	Total		27	0	2	0	—		—		29	0
Young Boys	2026–27	Swiss Super League	3	1	0	0	—		—		3	1
Career total			305	7	27	2	25	1	0	0	357	10

=== International ===
As of match played 7 June 2025

Appearances and goals by national team and year
National team	Year	Apps	Goals
Switzerland	2021	1	0
Switzerland	2023	2	0
Switzerland	2024	1	0
Switzerland	2025	2	0
Total		6	0

== Honours ==
Young Boys

- Swiss Super League: 2019–20, 2020–21, 2022–23
- Swiss Cup: 2022–23
