= Mert Kömür =

German footballer

Personal information
- Date of birth: 17 July 2005 (age 21)
- Place of birth: Dachau, Bavaria, Germany
- Height: 1.83 m (6 ft 0 in)
- Position: Midfielder

Team information
- Current team: FC Augsburg
- Number: 10

Youth career
- TSV 1865 Dachau
- 2016–2019: 1860 Munich
- 2019–2023: FC Augsburg

Senior career*
Years	Team	Apps	(Gls)
2023–2026	FC Augsburg II	23	(4)
2024–	FC Augsburg	60	(6)

International career^{‡}
2021	Germany U17	3	(0)
2022–2023	Germany U18	6	(1)
2023–2024	Germany U19	9	(4)
2024–2025	Germany U19	6	(1)
2025–	Germany U21	11	(0)
- * Club domestic league appearances and goals as of 31 October 2026 ‡ National team caps and goals as of 20:45, 17 November 2026 (UTC)

Mert Kömür (born 17 July 2005) is a German professional footballer who plays as a midfielder for Bundesliga club FC Augsburg.

== Club career ==
Kömür is a youth product of TSV 1865 Dachau and 1860 Munich, before moving to the youth academy of FC Augsburg in 2019. He was promoted to FC Augsburg II in the Regionalliga in 2023. He signed his first professional contract with Augsburg on 8 February 2023 until 2027. He made his senior and professional debut with Augsburg as a substitute in a 3–1 Bundesliga loss to TSG Hoffenheim on 7 April 2024.

== International career ==
Born in Germany, Kömür is of Turkish descent through his father. He is a youth international for Germany, having played up to the Germany U19s.

== Career statistics ==
As of match played 31 October 2026

Appearances and goals by club, season and competition
Club	Season	League			DFB-Pokal		Europe		Other		Total	
Club	Season	Division	Apps	Goals	Apps	Goals	Apps	Goals	Apps	Goals	Apps	Goals
FC Augsburg II	2022–23	Regionalliga Bayern	10	2	—		—		—		10	2
FC Augsburg II	2023–24	Regionalliga Bayern	13	2	—		—		—		13	2
FC Augsburg II	Total		23	4	—		—		—		23	4
FC Augsburg	2023–24	Bundesliga	4	1	0	0	—		—		4	1
FC Augsburg	2024–25	Bundesliga	20	2	3	0	—		—		23	2
FC Augsburg	2025–26	Bundesliga	28	2	2	0	—		—		30	2
FC Augsburg	2026–27	Bundesliga	8	1	2	0	—		—		10	1
FC Augsburg	Total		60	6	7	0	—		—		67	6
Career total			83	10	7	0	0	0	0	0	90	10
