= Alexis Claude-Maurice =

French footballer (born 1998)

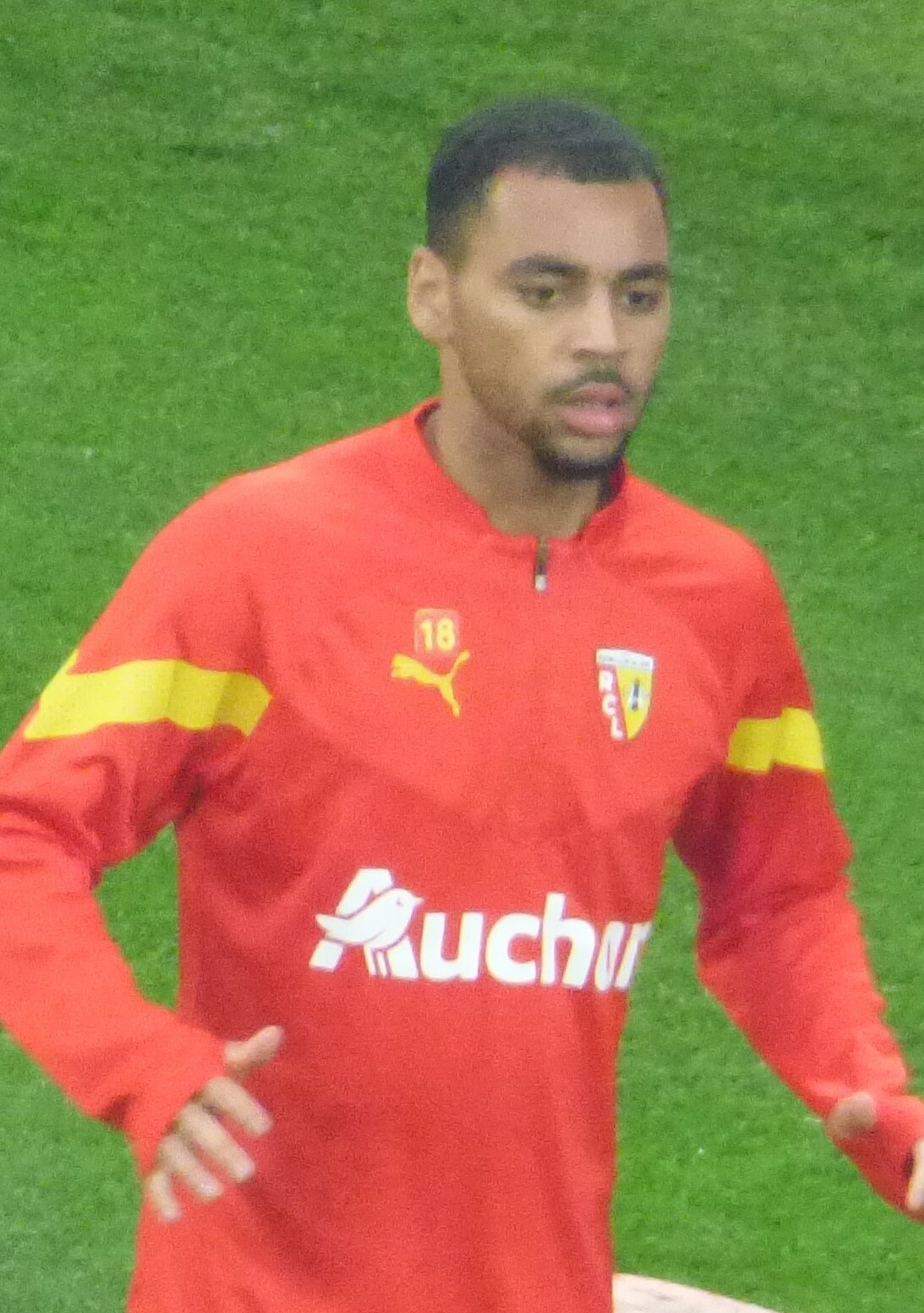
- Claude-Maurice with Lens in 2023

Personal information
- Date of birth: 6 June 1998 (age 28)
- Place of birth: Noisy-le-Grand, France
- Height: 1.75 m (5 ft 9 in)
- Positions: Attacking midfielder; forward

Team information
- Current team: FC Augsburg
- Number: 20

Youth career
- 2004–2013: Torcy
- 2014–2017: Lorient

Senior career*
| Years | Team | Apps | (Gls) |
| 2015–2018 | Lorient B | 47 | (13) |
| 2017–2019 | Lorient | 57 | (18) |
| 2019–2024 | Nice | 82 | (5) |
| 2022–2023 | → Lens (loan) | 20 | (5) |
| 2024– | FC Augsburg | 61 | (14) |

International career^{‡}
| 2015 | France U17 | 3 | (1) |
| 2015–2016 | France U18 | 10 | (1) |
| 2016–2017 | France U19 | 9 | (0) |
| 2017 | France U20 | 2 | (0) |
| 2021 | France U21 | 2 | (0) |
- * Club domestic league appearances and goals as of 17:30, 31 October 2026 (UTC) ‡ National team caps and goals as of 31 March 2021

Alexis Claude-Maurice (born 6 June 1998) is a French professional footballer who plays as an attacking midfielder and forward for Bundesliga club FC Augsburg.

== Club career ==
On 31 August 2022, Claude-Maurice joined Ligue 1 club Lens on a season-long loan. He scored his first goal with Lens on 1 January 2023 in a 3–1 win over leader Paris Saint-Germain.

On 30 August 2024, Claude-Maurice signed a three-year contract with FC Augsburg in Germany.

== Personal life ==
Claude-Maurice is of Guadeloupean Reunionese Malagasy descent.

== Career statistics ==
As of match played 31 October 2026

Appearances and goals by club, season and competition
| Club | Season | League | | | National cup (Note: Includes Coupe de France, DFB-Pokal) | | League cup (Note: Includes Coupe de la Ligue) | | Europe | | Total | |
| Club | Season | Division | Apps | Goals | Apps | Goals | Apps | Goals | Apps | Goals | Apps | Goals |
|---|---|---|---|---|---|---|---|---|---|---|---|---|
| Lorient B | 2016–17 | CFA | 20 | 7 | — | | — | | — | | 20 | 7 |
| Lorient B | 2017–18 | CFA | 8 | 2 | — | | — | | — | | 8 | 2 |
| Lorient B | Total | | 28 | 9 | — | | — | | — | | 28 | 9 |
| Lorient | 2016–17 | Ligue 1 | 0 | 0 | 0 | 0 | 0 | 0 | — | | 0 | 0 |
| Lorient | 2017–18 | Ligue 2 | 20 | 3 | 1 | 1 | 2 | 0 | — | | 23 | 4 |
| Lorient | 2018–19 | Ligue 2 | 35 | 14 | 1 | 0 | 1 | 0 | — | | 37 | 14 |
| Lorient | 2019–20 | Ligue 2 | 2 | 1 | 0 | 0 | 0 | 0 | — | | 2 | 1 |
| Lorient | Total | | 57 | 18 | 2 | 1 | 3 | 0 | — | | 62 | 19 |
| Nice | 2019–20 | Ligue 1 | 22 | 1 | 2 | 0 | — | | — | | 24 | 1 |
| Nice | 2020–21 | Ligue 1 | 30 | 4 | 1 | 0 | — | | 6 (Note: Appearances in UEFA Europa League) | 1 | 36 | 5 |
| Nice | 2021–22 | Ligue 1 | 10 | 0 | 1 | 0 | — | | — | | 11 | 0 |
| Nice | 2022–23 | Ligue 1 | 2 | 0 | 0 | 0 | — | | 1 (Note: Appearance in UEFA Europa Conference League) | 1 | 3 | 1 |
| Nice | 2023–24 | Ligue 1 | 18 | 0 | 3 | 1 | — | | — | | 21 | 1 |
| Nice | Total | | 82 | 5 | 7 | 1 | — | | 7 | 2 | 96 | 8 |
| Lens (loan) | 2022–23 | Ligue 1 | 20 | 5 | 3 | 1 | — | | — | | 23 | 5 |
| FC Augsburg | 2024–25 | Bundesliga | 28 | 8 | 3 | 1 | — | | — | | 31 | 9 |
| FC Augsburg | 2025–26 | Bundesliga | 29 | 5 | 1 | 0 | — | | — | | 30 | 5 |
| FC Augsburg | 2026–27 | Bundesliga | 4 | 1 | 0 | 0 | — | | — | | 4 | 1 |
| FC Augsburg | Total | | 61 | 14 | 4 | 1 | — | | — | | 65 | 15 |
| Career total | | | 240 | 51 | 16 | 4 | 3 | 0 | 7 | 2 | 274 | 57 |

== Honours ==
Nice

- Coupe de France runner-up: 2021–22
