= 2024–25 FC Augsburg season =

FC Augsburg
2024–25 season
- Chairman: Klaus Hofmann
- Head coach: Jess Thorup
- Stadium: WWK Arena
- Bundesliga: 12th
- DFB-Pokal: Quarter-finals
- Top goalscorer: League: Alexis Claude-Maurice (9); All: Alexis Claude-Maurice (9)
- Average home league attendance: 29,923
Home colours	Away colours	Third colours

The 2024–25 season was the 118th season in the history of FC Augsburg, and the club's 14th consecutive season in the Bundesliga. In addition to the domestic league, the club participated in the DFB-Pokal.

On 23 May 2025, Augsburg officially dismissed head coach Jess Thorup following a disappointing end to the season, which included a run of four consecutive losses.

== Transfers ==
=== In ===
Pos.	Player	Transferred from	Fee	Date	Source
MF	(Japan) Masaya Okugawa	(Germany) Hamburger SV	Loan return	30 June 2024	
DF	(Croatia) Kristijan Jakić	(Germany) Eintracht Frankfurt	Loan return	30 June 2024	
DF	(Croatia) David Čolina	(Denmark) Vejle	Loan return	30 June 2024	
FW	(France) Nathanaël Mbuku	(France) Saint-Étienne	Loan return	30 June 2024	
GK	(Croatia) Nediljko Labrović	(Croatia) Rijeka	€2,500,000	1 July 2024	
FW	(Germany) Yusuf Kabadayı	(Germany) Bayern Munich II	€900,000	4 July 2024	
FW	(Benin) Steve Mounié	(France) Brest	Free	5 July 2024	

=== Out ===
Pos.	Player	Transferred to	Fee	Date	Source
DF	(Brazil) Iago	(Brazil) Bahia	End of contract	1 July 2024	
FW	(Germany) Sven Michel	(Germany) SC Paderborn	€300,000	5 July 2024	
FW	(Croatia) Dion Beljo	(Austria) Rapid Wien	Loan	9 July 2024	
FW	(Bosnia and Herzegovina) Ermedin Demirović	(Germany) VfB Stuttgart	€21,000,000	16 July 2024	
DF	(Croatia) David Čolina	(Denmark) Vejle	Loan	20 July 2024	
MF	(Belgium) Arne Engels	(Scotland) Celtic	€11,000,000	30 August 2024	
MF	(France) Nathanaël Mbuku	(Croatia) Dinamo Zagreb	Undisclosed	3 September 2024	

== Friendlies ==
FC Augsburg held a gathering in South Africa from 18 to 28 July, a first in their history.

13 July 2024 Friendly	Schwaben Augsburg	0–3	FC Augsburg	Augsburg
14:00 CEST (UTC+2)		Report	Mbuku 24'; Tietz 54'; Okugawa 67' (pen.)	Stadium: Rosenaustadion; Attendance: 2,500

20 July 2024 Mpumalanga Premier's International Cup	Young Africans	1–2	FC Augsburg	Mbombela, South Africa
15:00 SAST (UTC+2)	Baleke 87'	Report	Pedersen 38'; Tietz 81'	Stadium: Mbombela Stadium

27 July 2024 Mpumalanga Premier's International Cup	TS Galaxy	2–1	FC Augsburg	Mbombela, South Africa
15:00 SAST (UTC+2)	Dithejane 19'; Kabini 37'	Report	Essende 50'	Stadium: Mbombela Stadium

3 August 2024 Friendly	FC Augsburg	1–0	Leicester City	Kempten
15:30 CEST (UTC+2)	Schlotterbeck 10'	Report		Stadium: Illerstadion

10 August 2024 Friendly	FC Augsburg	1–3	Marseille	Augsburg
17:00 CEST (UTC+2)	Gouweleeuw 44'	Report	Henrique 20'; Greenwood 21'; Harit 73'	Stadium: WWK Arena; Attendance: 15,378

5 September 2024 Friendly	FC Augsburg	4–1	SSV Ulm	Dinkelscherben
17:30 CEST (UTC+2)	Maier 2', 27'; Kabadayı 25'; Breithaupt 76'	Report	Röser 72'	Stadium: GW-TEC Arena; Attendance: 2,500

10 October 2024 Friendly	FC Augsburg	1–0	Jahn Regensburg
14:00	Wolf 30'

14 November 2024 Friendly	FC Augsburg	7–0	FC Ingolstadt
14:00

== Competitions ==
=== Overall record ===
Competition	First match	Last match	Starting round	Final position	Record							
Competition	First match	Last match	Starting round	Final position	Pld	W	D	L	GF	GA	GD	Win %
Bundesliga	24 August 2024	17 May 2025	Matchday 1	12th	25	9	8	8	28	35	−7	36.00
DFB-Pokal	18 August 2024	4 February 2025	First round	Quarter-finals	2	2	0	0	7	1	+6	100.00
Total					27	11	8	8	35	36	−1	40.74

Source: Soccerway

=== Bundesliga ===
==== League table ====
Pos	Team	Pld	W	D	L	GF	GA	GD	Pts
10	Borussia Mönchengladbach	34	13	6	15	55	57	−2	45
11	VfL Wolfsburg	34	11	10	13	56	54	+2	43
12	FC Augsburg	34	11	10	13	35	51	−16	43
13	Union Berlin	34	10	10	14	35	51	−16	40
14	FC St. Pauli	34	8	8	18	28	41	−13	32

Source: Bundesliga
Rules for classification: 1) Points; 2) Goal difference; 3) Goals scored; 4) Head-to-head results; 5) Head-to-head away goals scored; 6) Away goals scored; 7) Play-off.
(Rules 4–6 only apply after home and away matches have been played between the tied teams.)

==== Results summary ====
Overall								Home						Away					
Pld	W	D	L	GF	GA	GD	Pts	W	D	L	GF	GA	GD	W	D	L	GF	GA	GD
34	11	10	13	35	51	−16	43	6	5	6	18	20	−2	5	5	7	17	31	−14

Last updated: 12 November 2025.
Source: kicker.de

==== Results by round ====
Round	1	2	3	4	5	6	7	8	9	10	11	12	13	14	15	16	17	18	19	20	21	22	23	24	25	26	27	28
Ground	H	A	H	H	A	H	A	H	A	H	A	H	A	H	A	H	A	A	H	A	A	H	A	H	A	H	A	H
Result	D	L	W	L	L	W	L	W	D	D	L	W	D	L	L	L	W	W	W	D	D	D	W	D	W	W	D	L
Position	9	15	11	12	15	13	15	12	11	13	14	13	13	13	13	13	12	12	12	12	12	12	11	11	11	10	8	
Points	1	1	4	4	4	7	7	10	11	12	12	15	16	16	16	16	19	22	25	26	27	28	31	32	35	38	39	39

Updated to match(es) played on 4 April 2025. Source: Bundesliga Fixtures & Results
A = Away; H = Home; W = Win; D = Draw; L = Loss

==== Matches ====
The league schedule was released on 4 July 2024.

24 August 2024 1	FC Augsburg	2–2	Werder Bremen	Augsburg
15:30 CEST (UTC+2)	Rexhbeçaj 16'; Essende 35', (yellow card) 90+3'; Engels (yellow card) 55'; Gouweleeuw (yellow card) 90+3'	Report	Agu 12'; Njinmah 58'; Grüll (yellow card) 90+5'	Stadium: WWK Arena; Attendance: 30,660; Referee: Sascha Stegemann

1 September 2024 2	1. FC Heidenheim	4–0	FC Augsburg	Heidenheim
15:30 CEST (UTC+2)	Wanner 9' (pen.); Scienza 30'; Beck 69'; Breunig 73'; Honsak (yellow card) 90+5'	Report	Gouweleeuw (yellow card) 45+7'; Schlotterbeck (yellow card) 67'; Rexhbeçaj (yellow card) 69'; Vargas (yellow card) 90+5'	Stadium: Voith-Arena; Attendance: 15,000; Referee: Martin Petersen

14 September 2024 3	FC Augsburg	3–1	FC St. Pauli	Augsburg
15:30 CEST (UTC+2)	Essende (yellow card) 39'; Wolf 47'; Rexhbecaj (yellow card) 58'; Giannoulis (yellow card) 62'; Tietz 67', (yellow card) 90+4'; Kabadayi 90+6'	Report	Guilavogui (yellow card) 5'; Ritzka (yellow card) 22'; Boukhalfa 75'; Mets (yellow card) 90+4'	Stadium: WWK Arena; Attendance: 30,660; Referee: Felix Zwayer

20 September 2024 4	FC Augsburg	2–3	Mainz 05	Augsburg
20:30 CEST (UTC+2)	Schlotterbeck 25'; Essende 57', (red card) 70'; Onyeka (yellow card) 84'; Rexhbeçaj (yellow card) 90+11'; Gouweleeuw (yellow card) 90+11'	Report	Sieb 13'; Burkardt 15', 49'; Hanche-Olsen (yellow card) 28'; Amiri (yellow card) 33' (yellow-red card) 35'; Kohr (yellow card) 90'; Widmer (yellow card) 90+7'	Stadium: WWK Arena; Attendance: 28,913; Referee: Sören Storks

28 September 2024 5	RB Leipzig	4–0	FC Augsburg	Leipzig
15:30 CEST (UTC+2)	Šeško 11', 15'; Seiwald (yellow card) 42'; Openda 46'; Simons 57'	Report	Onyeka (yellow card) 78'; Matsima (yellow card) 83'	Stadium: Red Bull Arena; Attendance: 44,407; Referee: Daniel Siebert

4 October 2024 6	FC Augsburg	2–1	Borussia Mönchengladbach	Augsburg
20:30 CEST (UTC+2)	Schlotterbeck 39'; Claude-Maurice 65'; Rexhbeçaj (yellow card) 73'; Bauer (yellow card) 90+5'	Report	Weigl (yellow card) 59'; Kleindienst 72'; Ranos (yellow card) 84'; Netz (yellow card) 88'; Hack (yellow card) 90+5'	Stadium: WWK Arena; Attendance: 30,660; Referee: Florian Badstübner

19 October 2024 7	Freiburg	3–1	FC Augsburg	Freiburg
15:30	Lienhart (yellow card) 24', (goal) 37'; Grifo 30'; Günter 45+1'	Report	Tietz 65'; Kömür (yellow card) 89'; Bauer (yellow card) 90+5'	Stadium: Europa-Park Stadion; Attendance: 33,500; Referee: Bastian Dankert

26 October 2024 8	FC Augsburg	2–1	Borussia Dortmund	Augsburg
15:30 CET (UTC+2)	Claude-Maurice 25', 50'; Giannoulis (yellow card) 42'; Tietz (yellow card) 73'; Gouweleeuw (yellow card) 87'	Report	Malen 4'; Kabar (yellow card) 71' (yellow-red card) 90+9'; Bensebaini (yellow card) 90+4'	Stadium: WWK Arena; Attendance: 30,660; Referee: Tobias Welz

2 November 2024 9	VfL Wolfsburg	1–1	FC Augsburg	Wolfsburg
15:30 CET (UTC+2)	Amoura 82', (yellow card) 88'	Report	Tietz 34'; Matsima (yellow card) 74'; Rexhbecaj (yellow card) 77'; Essende (yellow card) 87'	Stadium: Volkswagen Arena; Attendance: 22,654; Referee: Felix Brych

10 November 2024 10	FC Augsburg	0–0	TSG Hoffenheim	Augsburg
15:30 CET (UTC+1)	Giannoulis (yellow card) 71'; Claude-Maurice (yellow card) 75'	Report	Kadeřábek (yellow card) 1'; Bülter (yellow card) 35'; Akpoguma (yellow card) 87'	Stadium: WWK Arena; Attendance: 28,300; Referee: Martin Petersen

22 November 2024 11	Bayern Munich	3–0	FC Augsburg	Munich
20:30	Kane 63' (pen.), 90+3' (pen.), 90+5'	Report	Schlotterbeck (yellow card) 47' (yellow-red card) 90+3'	Stadium: Allianz Arena; Attendance: 75,000; Referee: Daniel Schlager

30 November 2024 12	FC Augsburg	1–0	VFL Bochum	Augsburg
15:30 CET (UTC+1)	Claude-Maurice (yellow card) 17'; Wolf (yellow card) 26'; Tietz 38' (pen.); Mounié (yellow card) 82'	Report	Wittek (yellow card) 68'; Ordets (yellow card) 72'; Bernardo (yellow card) 83'	Stadium: WWK Arena; Attendance: 29,556; Referee: Tobias Reichel

7 December 2024 13	Eintracht Frankfurt	2–2	FC Augsburg	Frankfurt
15:30 CET (UTC+1)	Nkounkou (yellow card) 12'; Ekitike 55'; Uzun 74'; Koch (yellow card) 90+5'	Report	Schlotterbeck (yellow card) 1'; Tietz 60'; Essende 71'; Vargas (yellow card) 90+5'	Stadium: Deutsche Bank Park; Attendance: 57,000; Referee: Bastian Dankert

14 December 2024 14	FC Augsburg	0–2	Bayer Leverkusen	Augsburg
15:30 CET (UTC+1)	Onyeka (yellow card) 12'; Gouweleeuw (yellow card) 44'; Tietz (yellow card) 54'	Report	Terrier 14'; Wirtz 40'	Stadium: Augsburg Arena; Attendance: 29,310; Referee: Felix Zwayer

21 December 2024 15	Holstein Kiel	5–1	FC Augsburg	Kiel
15:30 CET (UTC+1)	Rosenboom 12'; Harres 32', 35'; Machino 39', 90+1'	Report	Claude-Maurice 5'; Wolf (yellow card) 29'; Giannoulis (yellow card) 68'; Vargas (yellow card) 83'; Mounié (yellow card) 86'	Stadium: Holstein-Stadion; Attendance: 14,830; Referee: Tobias Welz

12 January 2025 16	FC Augsburg	0–1	VFB Stuttgart	Augsburg
17:30 CET (UTC+1)	Onyeka (yellow card) 15'; Jakić (yellow card) 45+1'; Matsima (yellow card) 67'; Gouweleeuw (yellow card) 73'; Rexhbeçaj (yellow card) 74'	Report	Undav 65'; Chabot (yellow card) 67'	Stadium: WWK Arena; Attendance: 30,660; Referee: Daniel Schlager

15 January 2025 17	Union Berlin	0–2	FC Augsburg	Berlin
20:30 CET (UTC+1)	Siebatcheu (yellow card) 60'	Report	Claude-Maurice 9', 30'; Koudossou (yellow card) 20'; Onyeka (yellow card) 79'	Stadium: Stadion An der Alten Försterei; Attendance: 21,560; Referee: Frank Willenborg

19 January 2025 18	Werder Bremen	0–2	FC Augsburg	Bremen
17:30 CET (UTC+1)	Ducksch (yellow card) 45+1'	Report	Essende 5', 45+1'; Zesiger (yellow card) 71'; Rexhbecaj (yellow card) 78'	Stadium: Weserstadion; Attendance: 39,350; Referee: Benjamin Brand

25 January 2025 19	FC Augsburg	2–1	1. FC Heidenheim	Augsburg
15:30 CET (UTC+1)	Matsima 45+1'; Gumny (yellow card) 88'; Schlotterbeck 90+2'	Report	Mainka 76'	Stadium: WWK Arena; Attendance: 30,660; Referee: Florian Badstübner

1 February 2025 20	FC St. Pauli	1–1	FC Augsburg	Hamburg
15:30 CET (UTC+1)	Banks 17' (o.g.); Eggestein (yellow card) 67'	Report	Giannoulis (yellow card) 60'; Banks (yellow card) 70'; Kömür 83'; Gumny (yellow card) 90+1'	Stadium: Millerntor-Stadion; Attendance: 29,546; Referee: Tobias Reichel

8 February 2025 21	Mainz 05	0–0	FC Augsburg	Mainz
15:30 CET (UTC+1)	Jenz (yellow card) 8'; Weiper (yellow card) 34'; Leitsch (yellow card) 76'	Report	Essende (yellow card) 43'; Zesiger (yellow card) 45+7'; Gouweleeuw (yellow card) 88'	Stadium: Mewa Arena; Attendance: 33,000; Referee: Daniel Schlager

15 February 2025 22	FC Augsburg	0–0	RB Leipzig	Augsburg
20:30 CET (UTC+1)	Claude-Maurice (yellow card) 28'; Matsima (yellow card) 60'	Report	Kampl (yellow card) 62'	Stadium: WWK Arena; Attendance: 28,260; Referee: Sascha Stegemann

22 February 2025 23	Borussia Mönchengladbach	0–3	FC Augsburg	Mönchengladbach
15:30 CET (UTC+1)	Kleindienst (yellow card) 18'; Omlin (red card) 28'; Pléa (yellow card) 88'; Itakura (yellow card) 90+4'	Report	Giannoulis (yellow card) 13'; Zesiger (yellow card) 34'; Claude-Maurice 55', 61', 71'	Stadium: Borussia Park; Attendance: 51,493; Referee: Florian Exner

2 March 2025 24	FC Augsburg	0–0	SC Freiburg	Augsburg
17:30 CET (UTC+1)	Giannoulis (yellow card) 45+1'	Report	Sildillia (yellow card) 80'	Stadium: WWK Arena; Attendance: 29,651; Referee: Harm Osmers

8 March 2025 25	Borussia Dortmund	0–1	FC Augsburg	Dortmund
15:30 CET (UTC+1)	Guirassy (yellow card) 57'	Report	Gouweleeuw 23'; Rexhbecaj (yellow card) 57'; Onyeka (yellow card) 70'; Banks (yellow card) 82'; Jakić (yellow card) 84'	Stadium: Signal-Iduna-Park; Attendance: 81,365; Referee: Deniz Aytekin

15 March 2025 26	FC Augsburg	1–0	VfL Wolfsburg	Augsburg
15:30 CET (UTC+1)	Tietz 53'; Gouweleeuw (yellow card) 90+6'	Report	Amoura (yellow card) 30'; Tomás (yellow card) 90+6'	Stadium: WWK Arena; Attendance: 28,351; Referee: Martin Petersen

29 March 2025 27	TSG Hoffenheim	1–1	FC Augsburg	Sinsheim
15:30 CET (UTC+1)	Kramarić 71' (pen.); Bülter (yellow card) 76'	Report	Zesiger (yellow card) 34'; Essende 46'; Onyeka (yellow card) 58'	Stadium: PreZero Arena; Attendance: 21,427; Referee: Tobias Reichel

4 April 2025 28	FC Augsburg	1–3	Bayern Munich	Augsburg
20:30 CEST	Giannoulis 30'; Zesiger (yellow card) 32' (yellow-red card) 58'; Claude-Maurice (yellow card) 45+1'; Gouweleeuw (yellow card) 84'	Report	Musiala 42'; Kane 60'; Matsima 90+3' (o.g.)	Stadium: WWK Arena; Referee: Matthias Jöllenbeck

12 April 2025 29	VfL Bochum	1–2	FC Augsburg	Bochum

20 April 2025 30	FC Augsburg	0–0	Eintracht Frankfurt	Augsburg

26 April 2025 31	Bayer Leverkusen	2–0	FC Augsburg	Leverkusen

4 May 2025 32	FC Augsburg	1–3	Holstein Kiel	Augsburg

11 May 2025 33	VfB Stuttgart	4–0	FC Augsburg	Stuttgart

17 May 2025 34	FC Augsburg	1–2	Union Berlin	Augsburg

=== DFB-Pokal ===
18 August 2024 First round	Viktoria Berlin	1–4	FC Augsburg	Berlin
13:00 CEST (UTC+2)	Liu 4'; Yildirim (yellow card) 57'; Dikarev (yellow card) 61'; Mensah (yellow card) 77'	Report	Rexhbeçaj 33', (yellow card) 47'; Essende 53'; Giannoulis (yellow card) 82'; Jakić (yellow card) 86'; Dorsch 87'; Tietz 90+2'	Stadium: Friedrich-Ludwig-Jahn-Sportpark; Attendance: 5,504; Referee: Eric Weisbach

29 October 2024 Second round	FC Augsburg	3–0	Schalke 04	Augsburg
18:00	Claude-Maurice 26'; Maier 87'; Essende 90'	Report		Stadium: WWK Arena; Attendance: 27,511; Referee: Frank Willenborg

4 December 2024 Round of 16	Karlsruher SC	2–2 (a.e.t.) (4–5 p)	FC Augsburg	Karlsruhe

4 February 2025 Quarter-finals	VfB Stuttgart	1–0	FC Augsburg	Stuttgart
