= Henri Koudossou =

Togolese footballer (born 1999)

Personal information
- Date of birth: 3 September 1999 (age 27)
- Place of birth: Munich, Germany
- Height: 1.80 m (5 ft 11 in)
- Position: Wing-back

Team information
- Current team: Arminia Bielefeld
- Number: 7

Youth career
- FC Ismaning
- 2017–2018: FC Memmingen

Senior career*
Years	Team	Apps	(Gls)
2018	FC Ismaning II	2	(1)
2018–2020	SV Pullach	38	(4)
2020–2022	FC Augsburg II	38	(6)
2022–2026	FC Augsburg	21	(0)
2022–2023	→ Austria Lustenau (loan)	6	(0)
2023–2024	→ ADO Den Haag (loan)	31	(2)
2025–2026	→ 1. FC Nürnberg (loan)	14	(2)
2026–	Arminia Bielefeld	6	(0)

International career^{‡}
2026–	Togo	2	(0)
- * Club domestic league appearances and goals as of 11 October 2026 ‡ National team caps and goals as of 29 September 2026

Henri Koudossou (born 3 September 1999) is a professional footballer who plays as a full-back for 2. Bundesliga club Arminia Bielefeld. Born in Germany, he represents Togo internationally.

== Club career ==
Koudossou is a youth product of the academies of FC Ismaning and FC Memmingen. He began his senior career with the reserves of Ismaning, before moving to the German Bayernliga side SV Pullach in 2018. In the summer of 2022, he moved to FC Augsburg's reserves in the Regionalliga, and on 30 June 2022 signed a professional contract with the club for three years. On 1 September 2022, he moved to the Austrian club Austria Lustenau in the Austrian Football Bundesliga on loan for the 2022–23 season. He made his professional debut and Austrian Bundesliga debut with Austria Lustenau as a late substitute in 1–1 tie with LASK on 11 September 2022.

On 18 July 2023, Koudossou moved on a new loan to ADO Den Haag in the Dutch second-tier Eerste Divisie.

On 8 August 2025, he was loaned by 1. FC Nürnberg in 2. Bundesliga.

On 25 June 2026, Koudossou signed with Arminia Bielefeld.

== International career ==
On 25 September 2026, Koudossou made his debut for the Togo national team in an AFCON qualifier against Burundi.

== Personal life ==
Born in Germany, Koudossou is of German and Togolese descent.

== Career statistics ==
As of match played 11 May 2025

Appearances and goals by club, season and competition
Club	Season	League			Cup		Europe		Other		Total	
Club	Season	Division	Apps	Goals	Apps	Goals	Apps	Goals	Apps	Goals	Apps	Goals
Memmingen II	2017–18	Landesliga Bayern	2	1	—		—		—		2	1
SV Pullach	2018–19	Bayernliga	18	0	—		—		—		18	0
SV Pullach	2019–20	Bayernliga	—		0	0	—		—		0	0
SV Pullach	2020–21	Bayernliga	20	0	—		—		—		20	0
SV Pullach	Total		38	0	0	0	—		—		38	0
FC Augsburg II	2020–21	Regionalliga Bayern	4	2	2	0	—		—		6	2
FC Augsburg II	2021–22	Regionalliga Bayern	27	4	—		—		—		27	4
FC Augsburg II	2022–23	Regionalliga Bayern	5	0	—		—		—		5	0
FC Augsburg II	Total		36	6	2	0	—		—		38	6
FC Augsburg	2022–23	Bundesliga	0	0	0	0	—		—		0	0
FC Augsburg	2024–25	Bundesliga	21	0	2	0	—		—		23	0
FC Augsburg	Total		21	0	2	0	—		—		23	0
Austria Lustenau (loan)	2022–23	Austrian Bundesliga	6	0	0	0	—		—		6	0
ADO Den Haag (loan)	2023–24	Eerste Divisie	31	1	4	0	—		2 (Note: Appearances in Eredivisie promotion/relegation play-offs)	0	37	1
Career total			134	7	8	0	0	0	2	0	144	7
