= Mahmut Küçükşahin =

Turkish footballer (born 2004)

Personal information
- Full name: Mahmut Can Küçükşahin
- Date of birth: 7 April 2004 (age 22)
- Place of birth: Turkey
- Height: 1.75 m (5 ft 9 in)
- Position: Defensive midfielder

Team information
- Current team: FC Augsburg II
- Number: 15

Youth career
- 2018–2023: FC Augsburg

Senior career*
Years	Team	Apps	(Gls)
2021–	FC Augsburg II	55	(1)
2024–	FC Augsburg	1	(0)
- * Club domestic league appearances and goals as of 28 June 2026

Mahmut Can Küçükşahin (born 7 April 2004) is a Turkish professional footballer who plays as a defensive midfielder for FC Augsburg II.

== Early life ==
Originally of Turkish descent, he was brought up in Munich, Germany and has both Turkish and German citizenship, thus making him eligible for selection by both the Turkey and Germany national teams.

== Career ==
A youth product of FC Augsburg, Küçükşahin made his first-team debut for the club in a 2–1 Bundesliga away loss to already crowned champions Bayer 04 Leverkusen on the last match day of the season, coming on as a substitute in stoppage time. On 17 July 2024, he signed a contract with FC Augsburg keeping him at the club until 30 June 2027, with the option of a further year.
