= 2020–21 1. FC Heidenheim season =

1. FC Heidenheim
2020–21 season
- President: Klaus Mayer
- Head coach: Frank Schmidt
- Stadium: Voith-Arena
- 2. Bundesliga: 8th
- DFB-Pokal: First round
- Top goalscorer: League: Christian Kühlwetter (13 goals); All: Christian Kühlwetter (13 goals)
| Home colours | Away colours | Third colours |

The 2020–21 season is 1. FC Heidenheim's 14th season in existence and the club's 7th consecutive season in the second flight of German football. In addition to the domestic league, 1. FC Heidenheim participated in this season's edition of the DFB-Pokal. The season covers the period from 7 July 2020 to 30 June 2021.

== Players ==
=== Current squad ===
As of 12 October 2020

Note: Flags indicate national team as defined under FIFA eligibility rules; some limited exceptions apply. Players may hold more than one non-FIFA nationality.

| No. | Pos. | Nation | Player |
|---|---|---|---|
| 1 | GK | GER | Kevin Müller |
| 2 | DF | GER | Marnon Busch |
| 3 | MF | GER | Jan Schöppner |
| 4 | DF | GER | Oliver Steurer |
| 5 | DF | GER | Oliver Hüsing |
| 6 | DF | GER | Patrick Mainka |
| 7 | MF | GER | Marc Schnatterer (Captain) |
| 8 | MF | GER | Andreas Geipl |
| 9 | FW | GER | Stefan Schimmer |
| 10 | FW | GER | David Otto (on loan from TSG 1899 Hoffenheim) |
| 11 | FW | GER | Denis Thomalla |
| 13 | FW | GER | Robert Leipertz |
| 16 | MF | GER | Kevin Sessa |
| 17 | FW | GER | Florian Pick |
| 18 | DF | GER | Marvin Rittmüller |

| No. | Pos. | Nation | Player |
|---|---|---|---|
| 19 | DF | GER | Jonas Föhrenbach |
| 20 | MF | GER | Dženis Burnić |
| 21 | MF | GER | Maximilian Thiel |
| 22 | GK | GER | Vitus Eicher |
| 23 | MF | COD | Merveille Biankadi |
| 24 | FW | GER | Christian Kühlwetter |
| 25 | MF | GER | Julian Stark |
| 27 | MF | AUT | Konstantin Kerschbaumer |
| 28 | MF | GER | Melvin Ramusović |
| 29 | MF | GER | Tobias Mohr |
| 30 | MF | GER | Norman Theuerkauf |
| 32 | FW | GER | Patrick Schmidt |
| 38 | FW | ITA | Gianni Mollo |
| 39 | GK | GER | Kevin Ibrahim |
| 40 | GK | GER | Diant Ramaj |

== Transfers ==
=== Transfers in ===
| Date | Position | Name | From | Fee | Ref. |
|---|---|---|---|---|---|
| 19 July 2020 | DF | Marvin Rittmüller | 1. FC Köln II | Free transfer | |
| 3 August 2020 | MF | Dženis Burnić | Borussia Dortmund | €500,000 | |
| 5 August 2020 | MF | Jan Schöppner | SC Verl | Free transfer | |
| 1 September 2020 | FW | Florian Pick | 1. FC Kaiserslautern | Undisclosed | |
| 1 September 2020 | FW | Christian Kühlwetter | 1. FC Kaiserslautern | Undisclosed | |

=== Loans in ===
| Date from | Position | Name | From | Date until | Ref. |
|---|---|---|---|---|---|
| 5 August 2020 | FW | David Otto | TSG 1899 Hoffenheim | 30 June 2021 | |

=== Transfers out ===
| Date | Position | Name | To | Fee | Ref. |
|---|---|---|---|---|---|
| 6 July 2020 | DF | Robert Strauß | Retired | | |
| 6 July 2020 | MF | Maurice Multhaup | VfL Osnabrück | Free transfer | |
| 6 July 2020 | FW | Andrew Owusu | Sonnenhof Großaspach | Free transfer | |
| 8 July 2020 | MF | Sebastian Griesbeck | 1. FC Union Berlin | Free transfer | |
| 8 July 2020 | DF | Timo Beermann | VfL Osnabrück | Free transfer | |
| 22 July 2020 | MF | Niklas Dorsch | (Belgium) K.A.A. Gent | Undisclosed | |
| 30 July 2020 | FW | Tim Kleindienst | (Belgium) K.A.A. Gent | Undisclosed | |
| 6 July 2020 | DF | Arne Feick | Würzburger Kickers | Free transfer | |

=== Loans out ===
| Date from | Position | Name | To | Date until | Ref. |
|---|---|---|---|---|---|
| 7 August 2020 | MF | Gökalp Kilic | SSV Ulm 1846 | 30 June 2021 | |
| 7 August 2020 | DF | Jonas Brändle | Sonnenhof Großaspach | 30 June 2021 | |

== Pre-season and friendlies ==
Win Draw Loss Fixtures

| 15 August 2020 Friendly | 1. FC Heidenheim | 2–0 | Rheindorf Altach | Altach, Austria |
| 15:00 CEST (UTC+2) | | | | Stadium: Cashpoint-Arena |

| 22 August 2020 Friendly | Rheindorf Altach | 2–0 | 1. FC Heidenheim | Altach, Austria |
| 17:00 CEST (UTC+2) | | | | Stadium: Cashpoint-Arena |

| 5 September 2020 Friendly | 1. FC Heidenheim | 6–2 | St. Gallen | Heidenheim, Germany |
| 15:00 CEST (UTC+2) | | | | Stadium: Voith-Arena |

| 9 October 2020 Friendly | 1. FC Heidenheim | 1–1 | FC Augsburg | Heidenheim, Germany |
| 14:30 CEST (UTC+2) | Theuerkauf 34' | Report | Suchý 8' | Stadium: Voith-Arena; Attendance: 331; Referee: Martin Petersen |

| 13 November 2020 Friendly | VfB Stuttgart | 1–0 | 1. FC Heidenheim | Stuttgart, Germany |
| 15:00 CET (UTC+1) | Förster 65' | Report | | Stadium: Robert-Schlienz-Stadion; Attendance: 0 Referee: Martin Petersen |

| 26 March 2021 Friendly | FC Augsburg | 3–1 | 1. FC Heidenheim | Augsburg, Germany |
| 14:00 CET (UTC+1) | Bénes 31'; Hahn 36', 47' | Report | Leipertz 5' | Stadium: WWK Arena; Attendance: 0 Referee: Robert Hartmann |

== Competitions ==
=== Overview ===
| Competition | First match | Last match | Starting round | Final position | Record | | | | | | | |
| Competition | First match | Last match | Starting round | Final position | Pld | W | D | L | GF | GA | GD | Win % |
|---|---|---|---|---|---|---|---|---|---|---|---|---|
| 2. Bundesliga | 18 September 2020 | 23 May 2021 | Matchday 1 | | 6 | 1 | 2 | 3 | 6 | 8 | −2 | 16.67 |
| DFB-Pokal | 13 September 2020 | | First round | First round | 1 | 0 | 0 | 1 | 0 | 1 | −1 | 0.00 |
| Total | | | | | 7 | 1 | 2 | 4 | 6 | 9 | −3 | 14.29 |

Last updated: 3 October 2020
Source: Soccerway

=== 2. Bundesliga ===
==== League table ====
| Pos | Team | Pld | W | D | L | GF | GA | GD | Pts |
|---|---|---|---|---|---|---|---|---|---|
| 6 | Karlsruher SC | 34 | 14 | 10 | 10 | 51 | 44 | +7 | 52 |
| 7 | Darmstadt 98 | 34 | 15 | 6 | 13 | 63 | 55 | +8 | 51 |
| 8 | 1. FC Heidenheim | 34 | 15 | 6 | 13 | 49 | 49 | 0 | 51 |
| 9 | SC Paderborn | 34 | 12 | 11 | 11 | 53 | 45 | +8 | 47 |
| 10 | FC St. Pauli | 34 | 13 | 8 | 13 | 51 | 56 | −5 | 47 |

Source: DFB
Rules for classification: 1) Points; 2) Goal difference; 3) Goals scored; 4) Head-to-head points; 5) Head-to-head goal difference; 6) Head-to-head away goals scored; 7) Away goals scored; 8) Play-off.

==== Results summary ====
| Overall | | | | | | | | Home | | | | | | Away | | | | | |
| Pld | W | D | L | GF | GA | GD | Pts | W | D | L | GF | GA | GD | W | D | L | GF | GA | GD |
|---|---|---|---|---|---|---|---|---|---|---|---|---|---|---|---|---|---|---|---|
| 34 | 15 | 6 | 13 | 49 | 49 | 0 | 51 | 10 | 3 | 4 | 28 | 16 | +12 | 5 | 3 | 9 | 21 | 33 | −12 |

Last updated: 23 May 2021.
Source: soccerway

==== Results by round ====
| Round | 1 | 2 | 3 | 4 | 5 | 6 | 7 | 8 | 9 | 10 | 11 | 12 | 13 | 14 | 15 | 16 | 17 | 18 | 19 | 20 | 21 | 22 | 23 | 24 | 25 | 26 | 27 | 28 | 29 | 30 | 31 | 32 | 33 | 34 |
|---|---|---|---|---|---|---|---|---|---|---|---|---|---|---|---|---|---|---|---|---|---|---|---|---|---|---|---|---|---|---|---|---|---|---|
| Ground | H | A | H | A | H | A | H | A | H | A | H | H | A | H | A | H | A | A | H | H | A | A | H | A | A | H | H | A | A | H | A | H | A | H |
| Result | W | L | D | L | D | L | W | D | W | W | W | D | L | W | L | W | D | L | L | W | W | D | W | W | L | L | W | W | W | L | L | W | L | L |
| Position | 2 | 9 | 11 | 12 | 13 | 13 | 10 | 8 | 8 | 8 | 8 | 8 | 8 | 8 | 8 | 8 | 8 | 8 | 8 | 8 | 8 | 8 | 8 | 8 | 8 | 8 | 8 | 8 | 8 | 8 | 8 | 8 | 8 | 8 |

Updated to match(es) played on 23 May 2021. Source:
A = Away; H = Home; W = Win; D = Draw; L = Loss

==== Matches ====
The league fixtures were announced on 7 August 2020.

| 20 September 2020 1 | 1. FC Heidenheim | 2–0 | Eintracht Braunschweig | Heidenheim |
| 13:30 CEST (UTC+2) | Schmidt 17' (pen.); Sessa 75' | Report | | Stadium: Voith-Arena; Attendance: 2,052; Referee: Nicolas Winter |

| 27 September 2020 2 | FC St. Pauli | 4–2 | 1. FC Heidenheim | Hamburg |
| 13:30 CEST (UTC+2) | Kyereh 26'; Schmidt 34' (o.g.); Wieckhoff 46'; Dittgen 70' | Report | Kühlwetter 78'; Mohr 80' | Stadium: Millentor-Stadion; Attendance: 2,226; Referee: Sven Jablonski |

| 3 October 2020 3 | 1. FC Heidenheim | 0–0 | SC Paderborn | Heidenheim |
| 13:00 CEST (UTC+2) | | Report | | Stadium: Voith-Arena; Attendance: 2,559; Referee: Timo Gerach |

| 18 October 2020 4 | Erzgebirge Aue | 2–1 | 1. FC Heidenheim | Aue |
| 13:30 CEST (UTC+2) | Cacutalua 54'; Testroet 79' | Report | Mohr 87' (pen.) | Stadium: Erzgebirgsstadion; Attendance: 500; Referee: Benjamin Brand |

| 25 October 2020 5 | 1. FC Heidenheim | 1–1 | VfL Osnabrück | Heidenheim |
| 13:30 CET (UTC+1) | Kühlwetter 54' | Report | Amenyido 61' | Stadium: Voith-Arena; Attendance: 0 Referee: Christian Dingert |

| 30 October 2020 6 | Fortuna Düsseldorf | 1–0 | 1. FC Heidenheim | Düsseldorf |
| 18:30 CEST (UTC+2) | Sobottka 33' | Report | | Stadium: Merkur Spielarena; Attendance: 0 Referee: Sascha Stegemann |

| 6 November 2020 7 | 1. FC Heidenheim | 4–1 | Würzburger Kickers | Heidenheim an der Brenz |
| 18:30 CET (UTC+1) | Thomalla 41'; Kühlwetter 56'; Mainka (yellow card) 70'; Leipertz 83'; Kerschbaumer 90+1' | Report | Toko (yellow card) 49'; Lotrič 71' (pen.); Dietz (yellow card) 81'; Douglas (yellow card) 85' | Stadium: Voith-Arena; Attendance: 0 Referee: (Germany) Robert Kampka |
Note: COVID-19 pandemic in Germany

| 21 November 2020 8 | Holstein Kiel | 2–2 | 1. FC Heidenheim | Kiel |
| 13:00 CET (UTC+1) | Wahl (yellow card) 8'; Mühling (yellow card) 33' (goal) 68' (pen.); Föhrenbach 45' (o.g.); Bartels (yellow card) 56'; van den Bergh (red card) 90+2' | Report | Kühlwetter (yellow card) 28' (goal) 87' (pen.) 90+4' | Stadium: Holstein-Stadion; Attendance: 0 Referee: (Germany) Aarne Aarnink |
Note: COVID-19 pandemic in Germany

| 29 November 2020 9 | 1. FC Heidenheim | 3–2 | Hamburger SV | Heidenheim an der Brenz |
| 13:30 CET (UTC+1) | Kühlwetter 27' 44' 90'; Geipl (yellow card) 55' | Report | Kittel 16'; Leistner 24'; Onana (yellow card) 29'; Ambrosius (yellow card) 32'; Leibold (yellow card) 76' | Stadium: Voith-Arena; Attendance: 0 Referee: (Germany) Florian Badstübner |
Note: COVID-19 pandemic in Germany

| 5 December 2020 10 | Greuther Fürth | 0–1 | 1. FC Heidenheim | Fürth |
| 13:00 CET (UTC+1) | Green (yellow card) 49' | Report | Mohr (yellow card) 43'; Burnić (yellow card) 45'; Theuerkauf 60' | Stadium: Sportpark Ronhof Thomas Sommer; Attendance: 0 Referee: (Germany) Thorben Siewer |
Note: COVID-19 pandemic in Germany

| 12 December 2020 11 | 1. FC Heidenheim | 1–0 | Hannover 96 | Heidenheim an der Brenz |
| 13:00 CET (UTC+1) | Kühlwetter 20'; Geipl (yellow card) 65' | Report | Bijol (yellow card) 42'; Haraguchi (yellow card) 80'; Franke (yellow card) 82'; Kaiser (yellow card) 85' | Stadium: Voith-Arena; Attendance: 0 Referee: (Germany) Sven Waschitzki |
Note: COVID-19 pandemic in Germany

| 15 December 2020 12 | 1. FC Heidenheim | 0–0 | Jahn Regensburg | Heidenheim an der Brenz |
| 18:30 CET (UTC+1) | | Report | | Stadium: Voith-Arena; Attendance: 0 Referee: (Germany) Felix Brych |
Note: COVID-19 pandemic in Germany

| 18 December 2020 13 | VfL Bochum | 3–0 | 1. FC Heidenheim | Bochum |
| 18:30 CET (UTC+1) | Blum 17'; Zoller 32'; Losilla (yellow card) 90'; Eisfeld 90+2' | Report | | Stadium: Vonovia Ruhrstadion; Attendance: 0 Referee: (Germany) Manuel Gräfe |
Note: COVID-19 pandemic in Germany

| 2 January 2021 14 | 1. FC Heidenheim | 2–0 | 1. FC Nürnberg | Heidenheim an der Brenz |
| 13:00 CET (UTC+1) | Burnić (yellow card) 37'; Thomalla 45+1'; Theuerkauf (yellow card) 61'; Mainka 75' | Report | Dovedan (yellow card) 64'; Nürnberger (yellow card) 84' | Stadium: Voith-Arena; Attendance: 0 Referee: (Germany) Michael Bacher |
Note: COVID-19 pandemic in Germany

| 8 January 2021 15 | SV Sandhausen | 4–0 | 1. FC Heidenheim | Sandhausen |
| 18:30 CET (UTC+1) | Biada 9'; Taffertshofer (yellow card) 29'; Röseler 32'; Rossipal 59'; Behrens 82' | Report | Sessa (red card) 22'; Burnić (yellow card) 29'; Hüsing (yellow card) 58' | Stadium: BWT-Stadion am Hardtwald; Attendance: 0 Referee: (Germany) Florian Badstübner |
Note: COVID-19 pandemic in Germany

| 17 January 2021 16 | 1. FC Heidenheim | 3–0 | Darmstadt 98 | Heidenheim an der Brenz |
| 13:30 CET (UTC+1) | Kühlwetter 49'; Mainka 59'; Busch (yellow card) 61'; Thomalla 83' | Report | | Stadium: Voith-Arena; Attendance: 0 Referee: (Germany) Robert Hartmann (referee) |
Note: COVID-19 pandemic in Germany

| 23 January 2021 17 | Karlsruher SC | 1–1 | 1. FC Heidenheim | Karlsruhe |
| 13:00 CET (UTC+1) | Bormuth 6' (yellow card) 70' | Report | Kühlwetter 60'; Pick (yellow card) 68' | Stadium: BBBank Wildpark; Attendance: 0 Referee: (Germany) Patrick Alt |
Note: COVID-19 pandemic in Germany

| 26 January 2021 18 | Eintracht Braunschweig | 1–0 | 1. FC Heidenheim | Braunschweig |
| 20:30 CET (UTC+1) | Bär 34'; Klaß (yellow card) 68' | Report | Hüsing (yellow card) 88'; Theuerkauf (yellow card) 90+5' | Stadium: Eintracht-Stadion; Attendance: 0 Referee: (Germany) Thorben Siewer |
Note: COVID-19 pandemic in Germany

| 31 January 2021 19 | 1. FC Heidenheim | 3–4 | FC St. Pauli | Heidenheim an der Brenz |
| 13:30 CET (UTC+1) | Kleindienst 15' 77'; Kühlwetter 48' (yellow card) 90+4'; Thomalla (yellow card) 32'; Burnić (yellow card) 70'; Busch (yellow card) 73'; Mainka (yellow card) 74' | Report | Burgstaller 3'; Kyereh 30'; Paqarada (yellow card) 42'; Smith (yellow card) 56'; Becker 72'; Zalazar 87' | Stadium: Voith-Arena; Attendance: 0 Referee: (Germany) Nicolas Winter |
Note: COVID-19 pandemic in Germany

| 13 February 2021 21 | 1. FC Heidenheim | 2–0 | Erzgebirge Aue | Heidenheim an der Brenz |
| 13:00 CET (UTC+1) | Mainka 3'; Burnić (yellow card) 6'; Theuerkauf (yellow card) 47'; Hüsing (yellow card) 63'; Kühlwetter (yellow card) 65'; Kleindienst (yellow card) 82' (goal) 90+2' | Report | Breitkreuz (yellow card) 33' (yellow-red card) 36'; Samson (yellow card) 89'; Rizzuto (yellow card) 89' | Stadium: Voith-Arena; Attendance: 0 Referee: (Germany) Lasse Koslowski |
Note: COVID-19 pandemic in Germany

| 20 February 2021 22 | VfL Osnabrück | 1–2 | 1. FC Heidenheim | Osnabrück |
| 13:00 CET (UTC+1) | Reis (yellow card) 16'; Trapp (yellow card) 35'; Beermann (yellow card) 70'; Santos 88' | Report | Kleindienst 42' (yellow card) 71'; Hüsing 50' | Stadium: Stadion an der Bremer Brücke; Attendance: 0 Referee: (Germany) Robert Kampka |
Note: COVID-19 pandemic in Germany

| 23 February 2021 20 | SC Paderborn | 2–2 | 1. FC Heidenheim | Paderborn |
| 18:30 CET (UTC+1) | Hünemeier (yellow card) 12'; Srbeny 45+2' (pen.) 90+1'; Michel (yellow card) 79' | Report | Kleindienst 13'; Geipl (yellow card) 50'; Kühlwetter (yellow card) 77'; Hüsing (yellow card) 90+2' | Stadium: Benteler-Arena; Attendance: 0 Referee: (Germany) Guido Winkmann |
Note: COVID-19 pandemic in Germany

| 28 February 2021 23 | 1. FC Heidenheim | 3–2 | Fortuna Düsseldorf | Heidenheim an der Brenz |
| 13:30 CET (UTC+1) | Sessa 20'; Hüsing (yellow card) 22'; Kleindienst 72' 83' | Report | Sobottka 63'; Peterson (yellow card) 69' (goal) 76' | Stadium: Voith-Arena; Attendance: 0 Referee: (Germany) Florian Heft |
Note: COVID-19 pandemic in Germany

| 5 March 2021 24 | Würzburger Kickers | 1–2 | 1. FC Heidenheim | Würzburg |
| 18:30 CET (UTC+1) | Kopacz 67' | Report | Schöppner (yellow card) 28'; Thomalla 47'; Strohdiek 64' (o.g.) | Stadium: flyeralarm Arena; Attendance: 0 Referee: (Germany) Deniz Aytekin |
Note: COVID-19 pandemic in Germany

| 20 March 2021 26 | Hamburger SV | 2–0 | 1. FC Heidenheim | Hamburg |
| 13:00 CET (UTC+1) | Leibold 15' 50' | Report | Kleindienst (yellow card) 31' | Stadium: Volksparkstadion; Attendance: 0 Referee: (Germany) Christof Günsch |
Note: COVID-19 pandemic in Germany

| 3 April 2021 27 | 1. FC Heidenheim | 0–1 | Greuther Fürth | Heidenheim an der Brenz |
| 13:00 CET (UTC+1) | Busch (yellow card) 46'; Geipl (yellow card) 48'; Theuerkauf (yellow card) 90+1' | Report | Ernst (yellow card) 44'; Meyerhöfer (yellow card) 74'; Bauer (yellow card) 87' (goal) 90'; Nielsen (yellow card) 90+1' | Stadium: Voith-Arena; Attendance: 0 Referee: (Germany) Sören Storks |
Note: COVID-19 pandemic in Germany

| 6 April 2021 25 | 1. FC Heidenheim | 1–0 | Holstein Kiel | Heidenheim an der Brenz |
| 18:30 CET (UTC+1) | Kleindienst 17'; Kühlwetter (yellow card) 44'; Schnatterer (yellow card) 90' | Report | | Stadium: Voith-Arena; Attendance: 0 Referee: (Germany) Michael Bacher |
Note: COVID-19 pandemic in Germany

| 11 April 2021 28 | Hannover 96 | 1–3 | 1. FC Heidenheim | Hanover |
| 13:30 CET (UTC+1) | Muslija 51' | Report | Busch 43'; Leipertz 75'; Schimmer 79' | Stadium: HDI-Arena; Attendance: 0 Referee: (Germany) Lasse Koslowski |
Note: COVID-19 pandemic in Germany

| 18 April 2021 29 | Jahn Regensburg | 0–3 | 1. FC Heidenheim | Regensburg |
| 13:30 CET (UTC+1) | Saller (yellow card) 33'; Gimber (yellow card) 67'; Wekesser (yellow card) 70' | Report | Thomalla 11' (yellow card) 17'; Schöppner (yellow card) 25'; Mainka 36'; Kleindienst 80' (pen.) | Stadium: Jahnstadion Regensburg; Attendance: 0 Referee: (Germany) Alexander Sather |
Note: COVID-19 pandemic in Germany

| 21 April 2021 30 | 1. FC Heidenheim | 0–2 | VfL Bochum | Heidenheim an der Brenz |
| 18:30 CET (UTC+1) | Hüsing (yellow card) 80' | Report | Tesche 33'; Bockhorn 82' | Stadium: Voith-Arena; Attendance: 0 Referee: (Germany) Deniz Aytekin |
Note: COVID-19 pandemic in Germany

| 24 April 2021 31 | 1. FC Nürnberg | 3–1 | 1. FC Heidenheim | Nürnberg |
| 13:00 CET (UTC+1) | Geis 2'; Nürnberger 26'; Krauß 54' | Report | Leipertz (yellow card) 13'; Kleindienst 19' (pen.); Schimmer (yellow card) 59' (yellow-red card) 90+4'; Hüsing (yellow card) 80'; Geipl (yellow card) 84' | Stadium: Max-Morlock-Stadion; Attendance: 0 Referee: (Germany) Sascha Stegemann |
Note: COVID-19 pandemic in Germany

| 9 May 2021 32 | 1. FC Heidenheim | 2–1 | SV Sandhausen | Heidenheim an der Brenz |
| 13:30 CET (UTC+1) | Kerschbaumer (yellow card) 11'; Hüsing (yellow card) 54'; Mainka 59'; Schnatterer (yellow card) 79'; Kleindienst 81' | Report | Zenga (yellow card) 21'; Keita-Ruel 43'; Kister (yellow card) 58' | Stadium: Voith-Arena; Attendance: 0 Referee: (Germany) Matthias Jöllenbeck |
Note: COVID-19 pandemic in Germany

| 16 May 2021 33 | Darmstadt 98 | 5–1 | 1. FC Heidenheim | Darmstadt |
| 15:30 CET (UTC+1) | Rapp 18'; Dursun 40' 54' 59' 83' | Report | Mainka (yellow card) 4'; Hüsing 12'; Kleindienst (yellow card) 89' | Stadium: Merck-Stadion am Böllenfalltor; Attendance: 0 Referee: (Germany) Patrick Hanslbauer |
Note: COVID-19 pandemic in Germany

| 23 May 2021 34 | 1. FC Heidenheim | 1–2 | Karlsruher SC | Heidenheim an der Brenz |
| 15:30 CET (UTC+1) | Schimmer 80'; Müller (yellow card) 90' | Report | Bormuth 39' (yellow card) 69'; Wanitzek (yellow card) 50'; Guèye 56'; Pisot (yellow card) 90+3' | Stadium: Voith-Arena; Attendance: 0 Referee: (Germany) Florian Heft |
Note: COVID-19 pandemic in Germany

=== DFB-Pokal ===
| 13 September 2020 First round | Wehen Wiesbaden | 1–0 | 1. FC Heidenheim | Wiesbaden |
| 18:30 CEST (UTC+2) | Tietz 61' | Report | | Stadium: Brita-Arena; Attendance: 250; Referee: Benjamin Brand |
