= 2017–18 1. FC Heidenheim season =

1. FC Heidenheim
2017–18 season
- Chairman: Klaus Mayer
- Manager: Frank Schmidt
- Stadium: Voith-Arena
- 2. Bundesliga: 11th
- DFB-Pokal: Round of 16
Home colours	Away colours	Third colours
- All statistics correct as of 28 January 2018.

The 2017–18 1. FC Heidenheim season is the 11th season in the football club's history. The season covers a period from 1 July 2017 to 30 June 2018.

== Players ==
=== Squad information ===
As of 16 March 2018

Note: Flags indicate national team as defined under FIFA eligibility rules; some limited exceptions apply. Players may hold more than one non-FIFA nationality.

No.	Pos.	Nation	Player
1	GK	GER	Kevin Müller
2	DF	GER	Marnon Busch
4	DF	GER	Oliver Steurer
5	DF	GER	Mathias Wittek
7	MF	GER	Marc Schnatterer (Captain)
8	MF	AUT	Martin Rasner
9	FW	GER	Robert Glatzel
10	FW	AUT	Nikola Dovedan
11	FW	GER	Denis Thomalla
15	FW	NED	John Verhoek
17	MF	GER	Maurice Multhaup
18	MF	GER	Sebastian Griesbeck
20	DF	ROU	Ronny Philp
21	MF	GER	Maximilian Thiel
22	GK	GER	Vitus Eicher

No.	Pos.	Nation	Player
23	DF	GER	Kevin Kraus
26	MF	GER	Marcel Titsch-Rivero
27	MF	GER	Kolja Pusch
28	DF	GER	Arne Feick
29	DF	GER	Robert Strauß
30	MF	GER	Norman Theuerkauf
31	FW	GER	Dominik Widemann
32	MF	GER	Kevin Sessa
33	DF	GER	Timo Beermann
34	DF	BIH	Ibrahim Hajtić
35	MF	USA	Kevin Lankford
36	MF	GER	Dave Gnaase
38	MF	GER	Tim Skarke
39	GK	GER	Matthias Köbbing

== Friendly matches ==
Win Draw Loss

30 June 2017	Heidenheim	8–0	Milan Heidenheim
18:00

1 July 2017	Heidenheim	17–0	TSV Seissen
16:00		Report

4 July 2017	Heidenheim	15–0	GrossKuchen
18:00		Report

7 July 2017	Heidenheim	18–0	Schwabsberg-Buch
18:00		Report

8 July 2017	Heidenheim	23–0	Eintracht Staufen
16:00		Report

14 July 2017	Heidenheim	1–2	Vysočina Jihlava
16:00		Report

14 July 2017	Wacker Burghausen	0–2	Heidenheim
18:00		Report

17 July 2017	Heidenheim	1–1	Slovan Liberec
17:00		Report

22 July 2017	Heidenheim	2–1	Stuttgart
16:00		Report

25 July 2017	Heidenheim	2–0	Göppingen
18:30		Report

31 August 2017	Austria Lustenau	0–1	Heidenheim
18:00		Report

6 October 2017	Sonnenhof Großaspach	1–4	Heidenheim
18:00		Report

== Competitions ==
Win Draw Loss

=== 2. Bundesliga ===
==== League table ====
Pos	Team	Pld	W	D	L	GF	GA	GD	Pts
11	SV Sandhausen	34	11	10	13	35	33	+2	43
12	FC St. Pauli	34	11	10	13	35	48	−13	43
13	1. FC Heidenheim	34	11	9	14	50	56	−6	42
14	Dynamo Dresden	34	11	8	15	42	52	−10	41
15	Greuther Fürth	34	10	10	14	37	48	−11	40

Source: DFB
Rules for classification: 1) Points; 2) Goal difference; 3) Goals scored

==== Results summary ====
Overall								Home						Away					
Pld	W	D	L	GF	GA	GD	Pts	W	D	L	GF	GA	GD	W	D	L	GF	GA	GD
19	7	4	8	27	33	−6	25	5	1	4	19	20	−1	2	3	4	8	13	−5

Last updated: 24 January 2018.

==== Results by round ====
Matchday	1	2	3	4	5	6	7	8	9	10	11	12	13	14	15	16	17	18	19	20	21	22	23	24	25	26	27	28	29	30	31	32	33	34
Ground	A	H	H	A	H	A	H	A	H	H	A	H	A	H	A	H	A	A	H	A														
Result	L	W	L	L	L	W	D	D	L	L	L	W	D	W	W	W	L	D	W															
Position	16	16	16	16	16	16	16	16	16	16	16	14	14	11	11	11	11	11	11															

Updated to match(es) played on 24 January 2018. Source:
A = Away; H = Home; W = Win; D = Draw; L = Loss

==== Matches ====
30 July 2017 1	1. FC Heidenheim	v	Erzgebirge Aue	Heidenheim an der Brenz
				Stadium: Voith-Arena
Note: Match postponed due to severe weather.

5 August 2017 2	Eintracht Braunschweig	2–0	Heidenheim	Braunschweig
15:30	Wittek 28' (o.g.); Boland 80'	Report	Strauß (yellow card) 18'; Griesbeck (yellow card) 82'	Stadium: Eintracht-Stadion; Attendance: 18,550; Referee: Daniel Siebert

9 August 2017 1	Heidenheim	2–1	Erzgebirge Aue	Heidenheim an der Brenz
20:00	Thiel 22'; Wittek (yellow card) 65'; Titsch-Rivero 82'; Griesbeck (yellow card) 86'	Report	Rizzuto (yellow card) 11'; Soukou 31'; Kempe (yellow card) 37' (yellow-red card)	Stadium: Voith-Arena; Attendance: 10,500; Referee: Florian Badstübner

19 August 2017 3	Heidenheim	1–2	MSV Duisburg	Heidenheim an der Brenz
13:00	Wittek (yellow card) 55'; Glatzel 59' (yellow card) 70'	Report	Bomheuer (yellow card) 51'; Stoppelkamp 61'; Tashchy 66'; Wolze (yellow card) 68'; Hajri (yellow card) 88'	Stadium: Voith-Arena; Attendance: 10,200; Referee: Harm Osmers

26 August 2017 4	FC St Pauli	1–0	Heidenheim	Hamburg
13:00	Flum 90+2'	Report	Feick (yellow card) 61'; Dovedan (yellow card) 76'; Pusch (yellow card) 87'	Stadium: Millerntor-Stadion; Attendance: 29,546; Referee: Thorben Siewer

8 September 2017 5	Heidenheim	1–3	Jahn Regensburg	Heidenheim an der Brenz
18:30	Schnatterer (yellow card) 72'; Widemann 85'; Feick (yellow card) 88'	Report	Geipl (yellow card) 24'; Knoll 67'; Mees 88'; Grüttner 90+4'	Stadium: Voith-Arena; Attendance: 10,500; Referee: Sven Waschitzki

17 September 2017 6	Bochum	1–2	Heidenheim	Bochum
13:30	Kruse 13' (yellow card) 74'; Stöger (yellow card) 68'	Report	Glatzel 16'; Busch (yellow card) 28'; Wittek 73' (yellow card) 90+2'	Stadium: Vonovia Ruhrstadion; Attendance: 13,236; Referee: Lasse Koslowski

20 September 2017 7	Heidenheim	2–2	Darmstadt 98	Heidenheim an der Brenz
18:30	Dovedan 32'; Halloran 60'; Wittek (yellow card) 79'; Griesbeck (yellow card) 87'	Report	Sobiech 35'; Hamit Altıntop (yellow card) 51'; Sulu (yellow card) 55' (goal) 85'; Höhn (yellow card) 66' von Haacke (yellow card) 89'; Steinhöfer (yellow card) 90+1'	Stadium: Voith-Arena; Attendance: 10,500; Referee: Patrick Alt

23 September 2017 8	Arminia Bielefeld	1–1	Heidenheim	Bielefeld
13:00	Salger (yellow card) 32'; Börner 78'	Report	Feick 59'; Wittek (yellow card) 67'	Stadium: SchücoArena; Attendance: 15,184; Referee: Aarne Aarnink

1 October 2017 9	Heidenheim	0–2	Dynamo Dresden	Heidenheim an der Brenz
13:30	Titsch-Rivero (yellow card) 29'; Halloran (yellow card) 40'; Pusch (yellow card) 49'; Dovedan (yellow card) 71'	Report	Konrad (yellow card) 14'; Kreuzer 26'; Mlapa 53'; Duljević (yellow card) 90+4'	Stadium: Voith-Arena; Attendance: 12,100; Referee: Florian Badstübner

15 October 2017 10	Heidenheim	3–5	Holstein Kiel	Heidenheim an der Brenz
13:30	Schnatterer 9' 52'; Kraus (yellow card) 26'; Dovedan (yellow card) 37'; Wittek (red card) 42'; Busch 48'; Feick (yellow card) 75'	Report	Ducksch (yellow card) 24' (goal) 40' 43' (pen.) 83'; Czichos (yellow card) 51'; Drexler 53'; Peitz (yellow card) 58'; Kinsombi 81'	Stadium: Voith-Arena; Attendance: 10,300; Referee: Felix Zwayer

20 October 2017 11	FC Ingolstadt 04	3–0	Heidenheim	Ingolstadt
18:30	Wahl 45'; Kittel 70'; Kutschke 79' (pen.)	Report	Titsch-Rivero (yellow card) 84'	Stadium: Audi Sportpark; Attendance: 9,242; Referee: Thorben Siewer

29 October 2017 12	Heidenheim	1–0	Nürnberg	Heidenheim an der Brenz
13:30	Griesbeck (yellow card) 42'; Titsch-Rivero (yellow card) 61'; Glatzel 67'; Thiel (yellow card) 90'; Dovedan (yellow card) 90+3'	Report	Mühl (yellow card) 28'; Löwen (yellow card) 71'	Stadium: Voith-Arena; Attendance: 12,600; Referee: Robert Schröder

5 November 2017 13	Fortuna Düsseldorf	2–2	Heidenheim	Düsseldorf
13:30	Neuhaus (yellow card) 30'; Ayhan (yellow card) 64' (yellow-red card); Hennings 78' (yellow card) 82'; Zimmer (yellow card) 87'; Raman 90+1' (yellow card) 90+1'	Report	Verhoek 83'; Glatzel (yellow card) 84'; Feick (yellow card) 87'; Skarke (yellow card) 88'; Müller (yellow card) 90+1'; Schnatterer 90+6' (pen.)	Stadium: Esprit Arena; Attendance: 23,956; Referee: Lasse Koslowski

18 November 2017 14	Heidenheim	4–3	Union Berlin	Heidenheim an der Brenz
13:00	Feick 44'; Verhoek 61' 74'; Schnatterer 66'; Thiel (yellow card) 78'; Philp (yellow card) 90+3'	Report	Kreilach (yellow card) 32'; Pedersen (yellow card) 59'; Polter 63' (pen.); Skrzybski 72' 75'	Stadium: Voith-Arena; Attendance: 12,000; Referee: Deniz Aytekin

24 November 2017 15	Sandhausen	1–2	Heidenheim	Sandhausen
18:30	Knipping 28'; Stiefler (yellow card) 45+1'	Report	Glatzel 48'; Titsch-Rivero (yellow card) 50'; Verhoek 72'	Stadium: BWT-Stadion am Hardtwald; Attendance: 5,243; Referee: Aarne Aarnink

1 December 2017 16	Heidenheim	3–2	1. FC Kaiserslautern	Heidenheim an der Brenz
18:30	Wittek (yellow card) 39' (goal) 56'; Schnatterer 68' (pen.) 90+1'; Theuerkauf (yellow card) 85'	Report	Abu Hanna (yellow card) 10'; Seufert (yellow card) 35'; Spalvis 57' (red card) 66'; Feick 80' (o.g.); Shipnoski (yellow card) 90'	Stadium: Voith-Arena; Attendance: 11,700; Referee: Rene Rohde

9 December 2017 17	Greuther Fürth	1–0	Heidenheim	Fürth
13:00	Magyar 28'; Wittek (yellow card) 41'; Maloča (yellow card) 62'; Gugganig (yellow card) 88'	Report	Thiel (yellow card) 20'; Glatzel (yellow card) 34'; Beermann (yellow card) 51'	Stadium: Sportpark Ronhof Thomas Sommer; Attendance: 6,965; Referee: Alexander Sather

16 December 2017 18	Erzgebirge Aue	1–1	Heidenheim	Aue
13:00	Soukou 8'; Tiffert (yellow card) 55'	Report	Titsch-Rivero (yellow card) 64'; Wittek (yellow card) 71'; Verhoek (yellow card) 73' (goal) 90+1'; Griesbeck (yellow card) 76'	Stadium: Erzgebirgsstadion; Attendance: 6,500; Referee: Sascha Stegemann

24 January 2018 19	Heidenheim	2–0	Eintracht Braunschweig	Heidenheim an der Brenz
20:30	Wittek (yellow card) 25'; Thomalla 48'; Pusch (yellow card) 51' (goal) 83'	Report	Teigl (yellow card) 37'; Valsvik (yellow card) 68'; Reichel (yellow card) 76'; Fejzić (yellow card) 83'; Zuck (yellow card) 90'	Stadium: Voith-Arena; Attendance: 10,500; Referee: Daniel Schlager

27 January 2018 20	MSV Duisburg	3–3	1. FC Heidenheim	Duisburg
13:00	Wolze 27' (pen.), 50'; Onuegbu 90'	Report	Thiel 14'; Schnatterer 33'; Bomheuer 42' (o.g.)	Stadium: MSV-Arena; Attendance: 13,105; Referee: Florian Heft

3 February 2018 21	1. FC Heidenheim	3−1	FC St. Pauli	Heidenheim an der Brenz
13:00	Beermann 15'; Thiel 16'; Verhoek 48'	Report	Bouhaddouz 8'; Sobiech (yellow card) 27'; Dudziak (yellow card) 90+3'	Stadium: Voith-Arena; Attendance: 12,300; Referee: Patrick Alt

=== DFB-Pokal ===
12 August 2017 Round 1	Unterhaching	0–4	Heidenheim	Unterhaching
15:30	Müller (yellow card) 22'; Schimmer (red card) 65'	Report	Verhoek (yellow card) 42'; Beermann 44' 74'; Glatzel 80'; Pusch 86'	Stadium: Sportpark Unterhaching; Attendance: 5,000; Referee: (Germany) Timo Gerach

25 October 2017 Round 2	Jahn Regensburg	2–5	Heidenheim	Regensburg
20:45	Nietfeld 45+1'; Grüttner 54'; Mees (yellow card) 77'; Nachreiner (yellow card) 90'	Report	Thiel 30' 50'; Glatzel 32' 82'; Pusch (yellow card) 43' (yellow-red card) (goal) 55'; Wittek (yellow card) 63'	Stadium: Continental Arena; Attendance: 6,678; Referee: (Germany) Christian Dingert

20 December 2017 Last 16	Heidenheim	1–2 (a.e.t.)	Eintracht Frankfurt	Heidenheim an der Brenz
20:45	Dovedan (yellow card) 56'; Feick (yellow card) 78'; Schnatterer 96'	Report	Gaćinović 95'; Hasebe (yellow card) 105+1'; Haller 109'	Stadium: Voith-Arena; Attendance: 11,000; Referee: (Germany) Sven Jablonski
