= 2025–26 1. FC Heidenheim season =

1. FC Heidenheim
2025–26 season
- President: Holger Sanwald
- Head coach: Frank Schmidt
- Stadium: Voith-Arena
- Bundesliga: 17th (relegated)
- DFB-Pokal: Second round
- Top goalscorer: League: Budu Zivzivadze (6); All: Budu Zivzivadze (6)
- Average home league attendance: 14,824
Home colours	Away colours	Third colours

The 2025–26 season was the 19th season in the history of 1. FC Heidenheim as a legally independent club, and the club's third consecutive season in the Bundesliga. In addition to the domestic league, the club participated in the DFB-Pokal.

== Season summary ==
=== Background and pre-season ===
In 2023, Frank Schmidt, who had managed 1. FC Heidenheim since they were a fourth-tier club in 2007, led the club to promotion to the Bundesliga. In the 2023–24 season, the club finished 8th in the Bundesliga, which qualified them for the 2024–25 UEFA Europa Conference League, though the club narrowly avoided relegation back to the 2. Bundesliga in the 2024–25 season. After finishing 16th in the regular season, the club played SV Elversberg, who finished 3rd in the 2. Bundesliga, in the relegation play-offs; after a 2–2 draw at home in the first leg, the second leg went into second-half added time level at 1–1 before Léo Scienza scored a 95th-minute winner to preserve Heidenheim's Bundesliga status. Following the end of the season, defender Norman Theuerkauf retired whilst backup goalkeeper Vitus Eicher was released and young midfielder Christopher Negele agreed a deal to join SpVgg Unterhaching.

It was anticipated that Heidenheim would again be in a relegation battle, with Südwestrundfunk writing that the aim for the season would be to avoid relegation, and Opta predicting a 17th-place finish. Heidenheim brought in just two new players ahead of the new season, signing forward Arijon Ibrahimović and goalkeeper Diant Ramaj on season-long loans from Bayern Munich and Borussia Dortmund respectively, though Mikkel Kaufmann returned to the first team from loan and young players Nick Rothweiler, Adam Kölle and Yannik Wagner were given first-team contracts.

=== August to December ===
Heidenheim began the season on 16 August 2025 with a 5–0 DFB-Pokal first round win over Bahlinger SC, with Léo Scienza scoring twice, and Mathias Honsak, Mikkel Kaufmann and Sirlord Conteh scoring the remaining Heidenheim goals. A week later, Heidenheim lost their opening Bundesliga match 3–1 to VfL Wolfsburg, with Scienza scoring the Heidenheim goal, and were beaten 2–0 by RB Leipzig on 30 August. Left back Leart Paqarada was signed from 1. FC Köln on 28 August, and Scienza was sold to EFL Championship club Southampton on 1 September, transfer deadline day. Maximilian Breunig and Luka Janes left on loan, to 1. FC Magdeburg and Sonnenhof Großaspach respectively.

It took Heidenheim until 27 September to pick up their first points in the Bundesliga; after a 2–0 home defeat to Borussia Dortmund on 13 September, and a 2–1 away defeat to Hamburger SV on 20 September (with Adam Kölle scoring the Heidenheim goal), Heidenheim picked up a 2–1 home win over FC Augsburg. Despite the match being goalless at half-time, Mikkel Kaufmann scored from a low Sirlord Conteh cross in the 47th minute, before Conteh scored from Kaufmann's low cross seven minutes later, to put Heidenheim two goals ahead before Augsburg got one back in the 98th minute.

== Players ==
=== First-team squad ===
As of 30 January 2026

Note: Flags indicate national team as defined under FIFA eligibility rules; some limited exceptions apply. Players may hold more than one non-FIFA nationality.

No.	Pos.	Nation	Player
2	DF	GER	Marnon Busch (vice-captain)
3	MF	GER	Jan Schöppner
4	DF	GER	Tim Siersleben
5	DF	GER	Benedikt Gimber
6	DF	GER	Patrick Mainka (captain)
8	MF	TUR	Eren Dinkçi (on loan from SC Freiburg)
9	FW	GER	Stefan Schimmer
10	MF	GER	Christian Conteh
11	FW	GEO	Budu Zivzivadze
16	MF	GER	Julian Niehues
17	MF	AUT	Mathias Honsak
18	FW	GER	Marvin Pieringer
19	DF	GER	Jonas Föhrenbach
20	MF	GER	Luca Kerber
21	MF	GER	Adrian Beck

No.	Pos.	Nation	Player
22	MF	GER	Arijon Ibrahimović (on loan from Bayern Munich)
23	DF	GER	Omar Traoré
25	DF	SUI	Leonidas Stergiou (on loan from VfB Stuttgart)
26	DF	GER	Hennes Behrens (on loan from TSG Hoffenheim)
28	DF	GER	Adam Kölle
29	FW	DEN	Mikkel Kaufmann
30	MF	GER	Niklas Dorsch
31	MF	GER	Sirlord Conteh
32	DF	KOS	Leart Paqarada
33	MF	GER	Nick Rothweiler
34	GK	AUT	Paul Tschernuth
37	FW	GER	Tobias Weigel
38	FW	GER	Yannik Wagner
40	GK	GER	Frank Feller
41	GK	GER	Diant Ramaj (on loan from Borussia Dortmund)

=== Out on loan ===
Note: Flags indicate national team as defined under FIFA eligibility rules; some limited exceptions apply. Players may hold more than one non-FIFA nationality.

No.	Pos.	Nation	Player
—	GK	GER	Kevin Müller (at Schalke 04 until 30 June 2026)
—	DF	GER	Thomas Keller (at Dynamo Dresden until 30 June 2026)

No.	Pos.	Nation	Player
—	MF	GER	Luka Janeš (at Sonnenhof Großaspach until 30 June 2026)
—	FW	GER	Maximilian Breunig (at 1. FC Magdeburg until 30 June 2026)

== Competitions ==
=== Bundesliga ===
==== League table ====
Pos	Team	Pld	W	D	L	GF	GA	GD	Pts	Qualification or relegation
14	1. FC Köln	34	7	11	16	49	63	−14	32	
15	Werder Bremen	34	8	8	18	37	60	−23	32	
16	VfL Wolfsburg (R)	34	7	8	19	45	69	−24	29	Qualification for the relegation play-offs
17	1. FC Heidenheim (R)	34	6	8	20	41	72	−31	26	Relegation to 2. Bundesliga
18	FC St. Pauli (R)	34	6	8	20	29	60	−31	26	Relegation to 2. Bundesliga

Source: Bundesliga
Rules for classification: 1) Points; 2) Goal difference; 3) Goals scored; 4) Head-to-head results; 5) Head-to-head away goals scored; 6) Away goals scored; 7) Play-off.
(Rules 4–6 only apply after home and away matches have been played between the tied teams.)
(R) Relegated

==== Match details ====
Bundesliga match details
Round	Date	Time	Opponent	Venue	Result F–A	Scorers	Attendance	League position	Ref.
1	23 August 2025	15:30	VfL Wolfsburg	Home	1–3	Scienza 29'	15,000	15th	
2	30 August 2025	15:30	RB Leipzig	Away	0–2		43,495	17th	
3	13 September 2025	15:30	Borussia Dortmund	Home	0–2		15,000	18th	
4	20 September 2025	15:30	Hamburger SV	Away	1–2	Kölle 90+3'	57,000	18th	
5	27 September 2025	15:30	FC Augsburg	Home	2–1	Kaufmann 47', S. Conteh 54'	15,000	17th	
6	5 October 2025	15:30	VfB Stuttgart	Away	0–1		60,000	18th	
7	18 October 2025	15:30	Werder Bremen	Home	2–2	Schimmer 67', Föhrenbach 83'	15,000	17th	
8	25 October 2025	15:30	TSG Hoffenheim	Away	1–3	Schimmer 75'	24,127	17th	
9	1 November 2025	15:30	Eintracht Frankfurt	Home	1–1	Zivzivadze 32'	15,000	18th	
10	8 November 2025	15:30	Bayer Leverkusen	Away	0–6		29,257	18th	
11	22 November 2025	15:30	Borussia Mönchengladbach	Home	0–3		15,000	18th	
12	29 November 2025	15:30	Union Berlin	Away	2–1	Schimmer 90', Schöppner 90+5'	22,012	16th	
13	6 December 2025	15:30	SC Freiburg	Home	2–1	Mainka 59', Schimmer 90+4'	15,000	16th	
14	13 December 2025	15:30	FC St. Pauli	Away	1–2	Pieringer 64'	29,546	17th	
15	21 December 2025	17:30	Bayern Munich	Home	0–4		15,000	17th	
16	10 January 2026	15:30	1. FC Köln	Home	2–2	Pieringer 15', Niehues 26'	15,000	17th	
17	13 January 2026	20:30	Mainz 05	Away	1–2	Schimmer 60'	24,500	18th	
18	17 January 2026	15:30	VfL Wolfsburg	Away	1–1	Beck 45+1'	19,361	16th	
19	24 January 2026	15:30	RB Leipzig	Home	0–3		14,000	18th	
20	1 February 2026	17:30	Borussia Dortmund	Away	2–3	Niehues 45+5', 48'	81,365	18th	
21	7 February 2026	15:30	Hamburger SV	Home	0–2		15,000	18th	
22	15 February 2026	15:30	FC Augsburg	Away	0–1		30,107	18th	
23	23 February 2026	19:30	VfB Stuttgart	Home	3–3	Dinkçi 20', Ibrahimović 34' pen., S. Conteh 82'	15,000	18th	
24	28 February 2026	15:30	Werder Bremen	Away	0–2		40,000	18th	
25	7 March 2026	15:30	TSG Hoffenheim	Home	2–4	Kerber 63', 84'	15,000	18th	
26	14 March 2026	15:30	Eintracht Frankfurt	Away	0–1		58,700	18th	
27	21 March 2026	15:30	Bayer Leverkusen	Home	3–3	Behrens 56', Pieringer 72' pen., 85'	15,000	18th	
28	4 April 2026	15:30	Borussia Mönchengladbach	Away	2–2	Mainka 26', Busch 64'	52,129	18th	
29	11 April 2026	15:30	Union Berlin	Home	3–1	Honsak 9', 36', Zivzivadze 79'	15,000	18th	
30	19 April 2026	15:30	SC Freiburg	Away	1–2	Zivzivadze 59'	33,800	18th	
31	25 April 2026	15:30	FC St. Pauli	Home	2–0	Zivzivadze 3', Dinkçi 82'	15,000	18th	
32	2 May 2026	15:30	Bayern Munich	Away	3–3	Zivzivadze 22', 76', Dinkçi 31'	75,000	18th	
33	10 May 2026	17:30	1. FC Köln	Home	3–1	Schöppner 8', 72', Ibrahimović 28'	50,000	17th	
34	16 May 2026	15:30	Mainz 05	Home	0–2		15,000	17th	

=== DFB-Pokal ===
DFB-Pokal match details
Round	Date	Time	Opponent	Venue	Result F–A	Scorers	Attendance	Ref.
First round	16 August 2025	15:30	Bahlinger SC	Away	5–0	Scienza 9', 61', Honsak 34', Kaufmann 77', S. Conteh 83'	4,000	
Second round	28 October 2025	18:30	Hamburger SV	Home	0–1		15,000	

== Transfers ==
=== In ===
Date	Pos.	Player	From	Fee	Ref.
28 August 2025	DF	Leart Paqarada (KOS)	1. FC Köln	Undisclosed	
12 January 2026	FW	Christian Conteh (GER)	Eintracht Braunschweig	Undisclosed	

=== Loans in ===
Date from	Pos.	Player	From	Date until	Ref.
25 June 2025	FW	Arijon Ibrahimović (GER)	Bayern Munich	End of season	
1 August 2025	GK	Diant Ramaj (GER)	Borussia Dortmund	End of season	
2 January 2026	DF	Hennes Behrens (GER)	TSG Hoffenheim	End of season	
15 January 2026	DF	Leonidas Stergiou (SUI)	VfB Stuttgart	End of season	
30 January 2026	FW	Eren Dinkçi (TUR)	SC Freiburg	End of season	

=== Out ===
Date	Pos.	Player	To	Fee	Ref.
30 June 2025	GK	Vitus Eicher (GER)		Released	
30 June 2025	MF	Norman Theuerkauf (GER)		Retired	
30 June 2025	MF	Christopher Negele (GER)	SpVgg Unterhaching	Free transfer	
1 September 2025	MF	Léo Scienza (BRA)	Southampton	Undisclosed	

=== Loans out ===
Date from	Pos.	Player	To	Date until	Ref.
1 September 2025	FW	Maximilian Breunig (GER)	1. FC Magdeburg	End of season	
2 September 2025	MF	Luka Janes (GER)	Sonnenhof Großaspach	End of season	
2 January 2026	DF	Thomas Keller (GER)	Dynamo Dresden	End of season	
20 January 2026	GK	Kevin Müller (GER)	Schalke 04	End of season	
