= Jan Schöppner =

German footballer (born 1999)

Personal information
- Date of birth: 12 June 1999 (age 27)
- Place of birth: Homberg, Germany
- Height: 1.90 m (6 ft 3 in)
- Position: Central midfielder

Team information
- Current team: 1. FC Heidenheim
- Number: 3

Youth career
- –2012: SCW Liemke
- 2012–2018: SC Verl

Senior career*
Years	Team	Apps	(Gls)
2017–2019	SC Verl II	12	(0)
2018–2020	SC Verl	36	(8)
2020–	1. FC Heidenheim	176	(13)
- * Club domestic league appearances and goals as of 20 September 2026

Jan Schöppner (born 12 June 1999) is a German professional footballer who plays as a central midfielder for 1. FC Heidenheim.

== Career ==
Schöppner joined 2. Bundesliga club 1. FC Heidenheim in August 2020 from SC Verl. He made his professional debut for Heidenheim in the first round of the 2020–21 DFB-Pokal on 13 September 2020, starting against 3. Liga side Wehen Wiesbaden before being substituted out in the 57th minute for Jonas Föhrenbach. The away match finished as a 1–0 loss. On 7 November 2024, Schöppner scored in a 0-2 victory over Hearts in a UEFA Conference League league stage match.

== Career statistics ==
As of match played 20 September 2026

Appearances and goals by club, season and competition
Club	Season	League			Cup		Europe		Other		Total	
Club	Season	Division	Apps	Goals	Apps	Goals	Apps	Goals	Apps	Goals	Apps	Goals
SC Verl	2017–18	Regionalliga West	0	0	0	0	—		0	0	0	0
SC Verl	2018–19	Regionalliga West	13	1	0	0	—		2 (Note: Appearance in DFB-Pokal qualifying and Westphalia Cup)	0	15	1
SC Verl	2019–20	Regionalliga West	23	7	3	0	—		3 (Note: Appearances in 3. Liga promotion play-offs and Westphalia Cup)	0	29	7
SC Verl	Total		36	8	3	0	—		5	0	44	8
1. FC Heidenheim	2020–21	2. Bundesliga	22	0	1	0	—		—		23	0
1. FC Heidenheim	2021–22	2. Bundesliga	32	1	1	0	—		—		33	1
1. FC Heidenheim	2022–23	2. Bundesliga	27	1	1	0	—		—		28	1
1. FC Heidenheim	2023–24	Bundesliga	26	2	1	0	—		—		27	1
1. FC Heidenheim	2024–25	Bundesliga	33	4	0	0	9 (Note: Appearances in UEFA Conference League)	1	—		42	5
1. FC Heidenheim	2025–26	Bundesliga	30	3	2	0	—		—		32	3
1. FC Heidenheim	2026–27	2. Bundesliga	6	2	1	0	—		—		7	2
1. FC Heidenheim	Total		176	13	7	0	9	1	0	0	192	14
Career total			210	20	10	0	9	1	5	0	236	21
