= Florian Pick =

German footballer

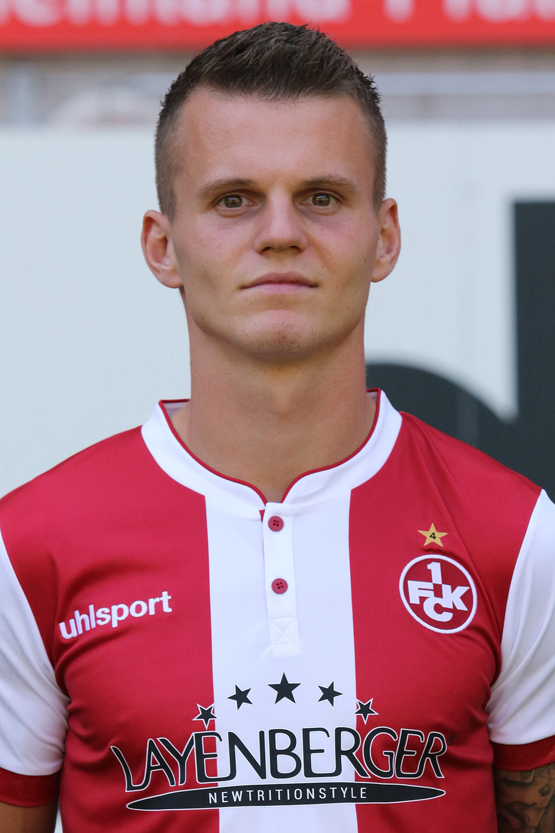
- Pick with 1. FC Kaiserslautern in July 2018

Personal information
- Date of birth: 8 September 1995 (age 31)
- Place of birth: Wittlich, Germany
- Height: 1.76 m (5 ft 9 in)
- Positions: Attacking midfielder; left winger

Team information
- Current team: 1. FC Saarbrücken
- Number: 20

Youth career
- 2008–2009: JSG Wittlich
- 2009–2011: Eintracht Trier
- 2011–2013: 1. FC Kaiserslautern
- 2013–2014: Schalke 04

Senior career*
Years	Team	Apps	(Gls)
2014–2016	Schalke 04 II	45	(2)
2016–2017	1. FC Kaiserslautern II	28	(1)
2017–2020	1. FC Kaiserslautern	67	(17)
2017–2018	→ 1. FC Magdeburg (loan)	16	(0)
2020–2024	Heidenheim	83	(3)
2022	→ Ingolstadt (loan)	16	(1)
2024–2025	1. FC Nürnberg	9	(1)
2025	Preußen Münster	15	(1)
2025–	1. FC Saarbrücken	38	(14)
- * Club domestic league appearances and goals as of 30 May 2026

Florian Pick (born 8 September 1995) is a German professional footballer who plays as an attacking midfielder or left winger for 3. Liga club 1. FC Saarbrücken.

== Career ==
In summer 2020, Pick, along with teammate Christian Kühlwetter, joined 2. Bundesliga side 1. FC Heidenheim from 3. Liga club 1. FC Kaiserslautern.

On 22 December 2021, Pick agreed to join Ingolstadt on loan for the rest of the season, with an option to buy.

On 27 June 2024, Pick signed with 1. FC Nürnberg. On 23 January 2025, he moved to Preußen Münster, also in 2. Bundesliga.

On 3 July 2025, Pick joined 1. FC Saarbrücken in 3. Liga.

== Career statistics ==
As of match played 18 May 2024

Appearances and goals by club, season and competition
Club	Season	League			Cup		Europe		Other		Total	
Club	Season	Division	Apps	Goals	Apps	Goals	Apps	Goals	Apps	Goals	Apps	Goals
Schalke 04 II	2014–15	Regionalliga West	27	2	—		—		—		27	2
Schalke 04 II	2015–16	Regionalliga West	18	0	—		—		—		18	0
Schalke 04 II	Total		45	2	—		—		—		45	2
Kaiserslautern II	2016–17	Regionalliga Südwest	28	1	—		—		—		28	1
Magdeburg (loan)	2017–18	3. Liga	16	0	0	0	—		3 (Note: Appearances in Saxony-Anhalt Cup)	0	19	0
Kaiserslautern	2018–19	3. Liga	29	4	1	0	—		5 (Note: Appearances in Southwestern Cup)	4	36	8
Kaiserslautern	2019–20	3. Liga	38	13	3	1	—		4	1	45	15
Kaiserslautern	Total		67	17	4	1	—		9	5	81	23
Heidenheim	2020–21	2. Bundesliga	28	0	1	0	—		—		29	0
Heidenheim	2021–22	2. Bundesliga	10	0	1	0	—		—		11	0
Heidenheim	2022–23	2. Bundesliga	23	3	1	0	—		—		24	3
Heidenheim	2023–24	Bundesliga	22	0	2	0	—		—		24	0
Heidenheim	Total		83	3	5	0	—		—		88	3
Ingolstadt 04 (loan)	2021–22	2. Bundesliga	16	1	—		—		—		16	1
Nürnberg	2024–25	2. Bundesliga	0	0	0	0	—		—		0	0
Münster	2024–25	2. Bundesliga	1	1	0	0	—		—		0	0
Career total			256	25	9	1	0	0	12	1	277	30
