= Marnon Busch =

German footballer (born 1994)

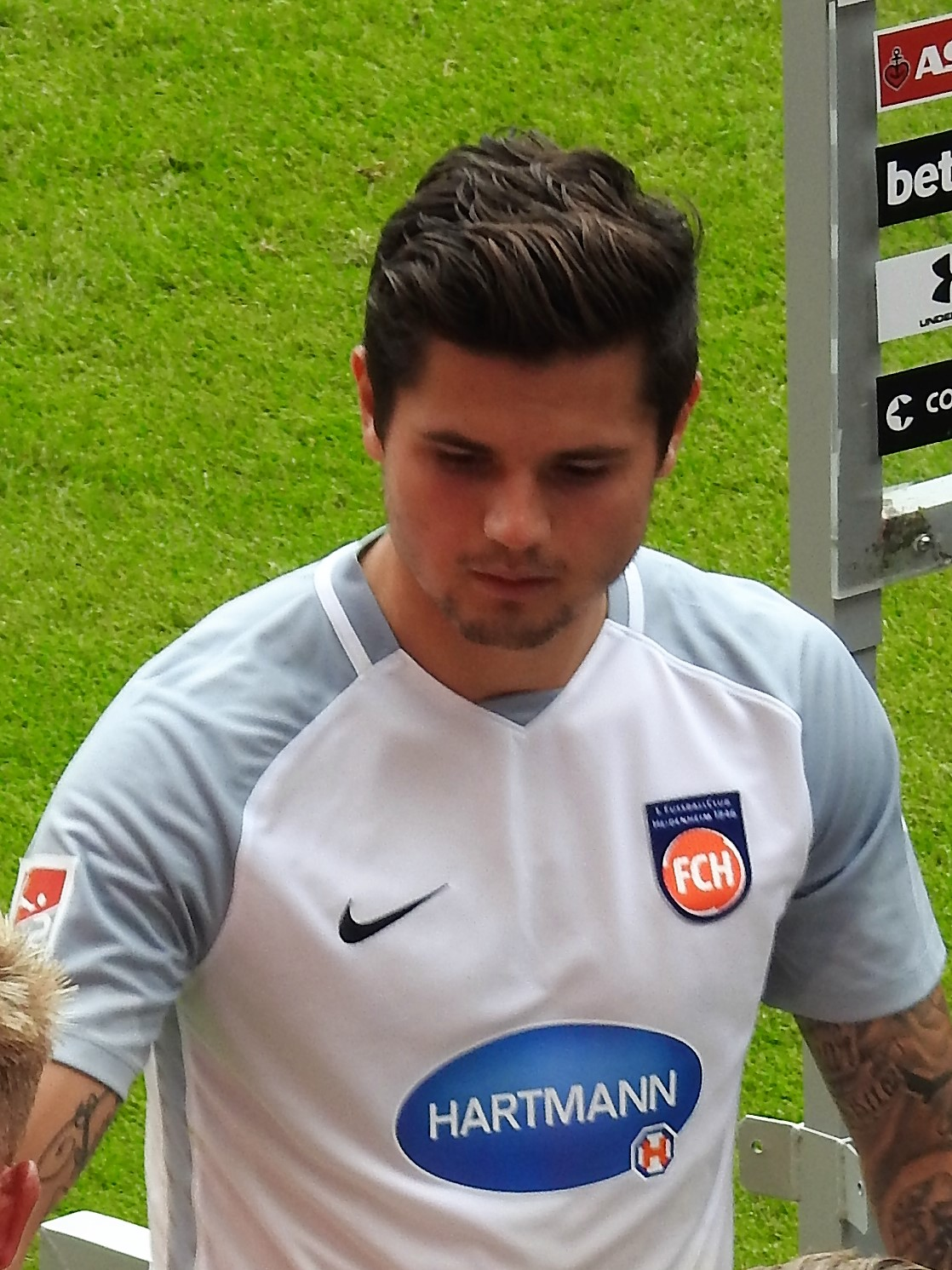
- Busch with 1. FC Heidenheim in 2017

Personal information
- Full name: Marnon-Thomas Busch
- Date of birth: 8 December 1994 (age 31)
- Place of birth: Stade, Germany
- Height: 1.82 m (6 ft 0 in)
- Position: Right-back

Team information
- Current team: 1. FC Heidenheim
- Number: 2

Youth career
- 2000–2004: SSV Hagen
- 2004–2007: TuS Güldenstern Stade
- 2007–2012: Werder Bremen

Senior career*
Years	Team	Apps	(Gls)
2012–2017	Werder Bremen II	76	(1)
2014–2017	Werder Bremen	9	(1)
2016–2017	→ 1860 Munich (loan)	11	(0)
2017–	1. FC Heidenheim	236	(5)

International career
2009	Germany U15	1	(0)
- * Club domestic league appearances and goals as of 20 September 2026

Marnon-Thomas Busch (born 8 December 1994) is a German professional footballer who plays as a right-back for 2. Bundesliga club 1. FC Heidenheim.

== Club career ==
Busch joined from Werder Bremen's youth system in 2007 from TuS Güldenstern Stade. He made his Werder Bremen II debut during the 2012–13 season. On 24 August 2014, he made his first team debut in a Bundesliga game against Hertha BSC replacing Izet Hajrović after 85 minutes in a 2–2 draw at the Olympiastadion in Berlin.

In June 2016, Busch joined 2. Bundesliga side 1860 Munich on loan for the 2016–2017 season. At the end of the season, the club was relegated.

In June 2017, Busch signed a three-year contract with 1. FC Heidenheim, also of the 2. Bundesliga.

== Career statistics ==
As of match played 20 September 2026

Appearances and goals by club, season and competition
Club	Season	League			Cup		Europe		Other		Total	
Club	Season	Division	Apps	Goals	Apps	Goals	Apps	Goals	Apps	Goals	Apps	Goals
Werder Bremen II	2012–13	Regionalliga Nord	28	1	—		—		—		28	1
Werder Bremen II	2013–14	Regionalliga Nord	6	0	—		—		—		6	0
Werder Bremen II	2014–15	Regionalliga Nord	12	0	—		—		—		12	0
Werder Bremen II	2015–16	Regionalliga Nord	28	0	—		—		—		28	0
Werder Bremen II	2016–17	Regionalliga Nord	2	0	—		—		—		2	0
Werder Bremen II	Total		76	1	—		—		—		76	1
Werder Bremen	2014–15	Bundesliga	9	1	1	0	—		—		10	1
1860 Munich (loan)	2016–17	2. Bundesliga	11	0	0	0	—		2 (Note: Appearances in 2. Bundesliga relegation play-offs)	0	13	0
1860 Munich II (loan)	2016–17	Regionalliga Bayern	4	0	—		—		—		4	0
1. FC Heidenheim	2017–18	2. Bundesliga	10	1	2	0	—		—		12	1
1. FC Heidenheim	2018–19	2. Bundesliga	32	0	3	0	—		—		35	0
1. FC Heidenheim	2019–20	2. Bundesliga	33	0	2	0	—		2 (Note: Appearances in promotion play-offs)	0	37	0
1. FC Heidenheim	2020–21	2. Bundesliga	30	1	1	0	—		—		32	1
1. FC Heidenheim	2021–22	2. Bundesliga	28	0	1	0	—		—		29	0
1. FC Heidenheim	2022–23	2. Bundesliga	30	2	2	0	—		—		32	2
1. FC Heidenheim	2023–24	Bundesliga	16	0	1	0	—		—		17	0
1. FC Heidenheim	2024–25	Bundesliga	23	0	1	0	8 (Note: Appearances in UEFA Conference League)	0	—		32	0
1. FC Heidenheim	2025–26	Bundesliga	28	1	2	0	—		—		30	1
1. FC Heidenheim	2026–27	2. Bundesliga	6	0	1	0	—		—		7	0
1. FC Heidenheim	Total		236	5	16	0	8	0	2	0	262	5
Career total			336	7	17	0	8	0	4	0	365	7
