= Denis Thomalla =

German footballer

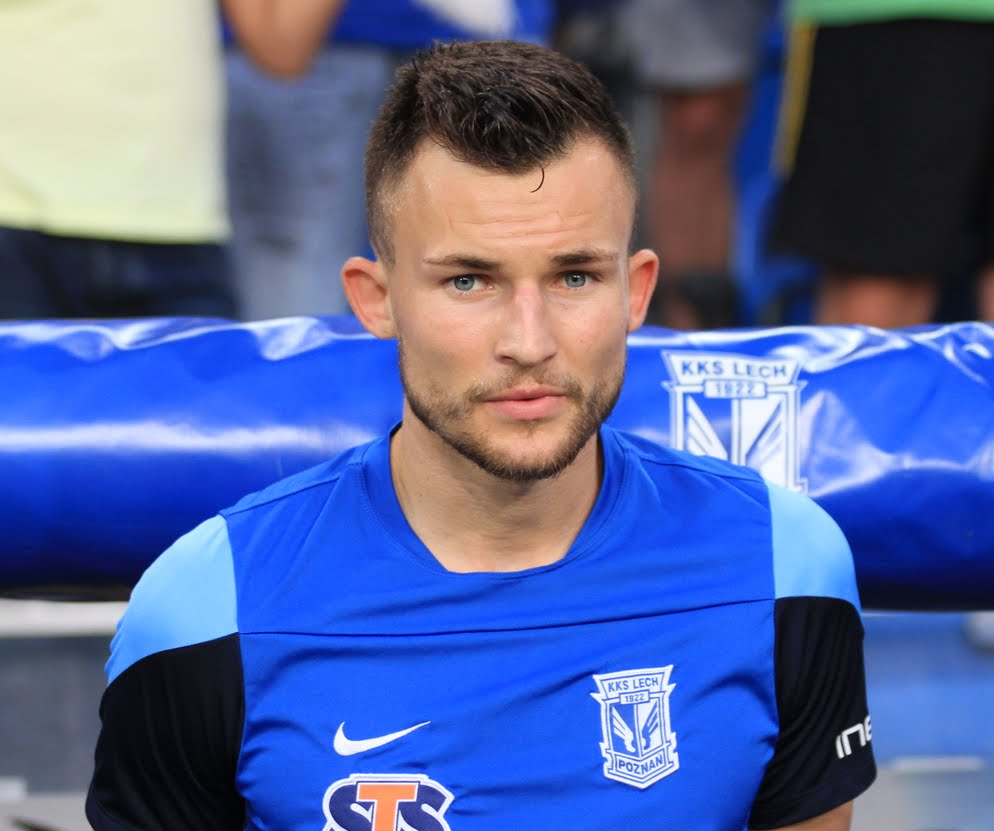
- Thomalla with Lech Poznań in 2015

Personal information
- Date of birth: 16 August 1992 (age 34)
- Place of birth: Pforzheim, Germany
- Height: 1.86 m (6 ft 1 in)
- Position: Attacking midfielder

Youth career
- SV Büchenbronn
- Karlsruher SC

Senior career*
Years	Team	Apps	(Gls)
2010–2013	1899 Hoffenheim II	72	(20)
2010–2013	1899 Hoffenheim	4	(0)
2013–2015	RB Leipzig	21	(3)
2014–2015	→ SV Ried (loan)	29	(10)
2015–2016	Lech Poznań	13	(0)
2016	→ 1. FC Heidenheim (loan)	13	(4)
2016–2025	1. FC Heidenheim	182	(25)
2025	AEL Limassol	7	(0)

International career
2009	Germany U18	6	(2)
2010–2011	Germany U19	6	(3)
- * Club domestic league appearances and goals as of 31 December 2025

Denis Thomalla (born 16 August 1992) is a German professional footballer who plays as an attacking midfielder.

== Early and personal life ==
Thomalla was born in Pforzheim, Germany to a Polish family originally from Opole.

== Club career ==
Thomalla played youth football for SV Büchenbronn and Karlsruher SC.

He started his senior career at TSG 1899 Hoffenheim where he made four appearances in the Bundesliga.

In 2013, Thomalla left Hoffenheim for RB Leipzig where played three in the 2. Bundesliga. On 1 September 2014, he was loaned out to SV Ried.

On 23 June 2015, Thomalla signed a three-year contract with Polish club Lech Poznań.

On 12 January 2016, Thomalla was loaned to 1. FC Heidenheim with the option of a permanent move. In April, Heidenheim chose to make use of the option to sign him permanently.

On 17 January 2025, Thomalla signed a one-and-a-half-year contract with Cypriot club AEL Limassol.

== International career ==
A youth international for Germany, Thomalla is eligible for the Polish and German national teams.

== Career statistics ==
As of match played 7 November 2025

Appearances and goals by club, season and competition
Club	Season	League			National cup (Note: Includes DFB-Pokal, Austrian Cup, Polish Cup, Cypriot Cup)		Europe		Other		Total	
Club	Season	Division	Apps	Goals	Apps	Goals	Apps	Goals	Apps	Goals	Apps	Goals
1899 Hoffenheim II	2010–11	Regionalliga Südwest	13	2	—		—		—		13	2
1899 Hoffenheim II	2011–12	Regionalliga Südwest	25	8	—		—		—		25	8
1899 Hoffenheim II	2012–13	Regionalliga Südwest	34	10	—		—		—		34	10
1899 Hoffenheim II	Total		72	20	0	0	0	0	0	0	72	20
1899 Hoffenheim	2010–11	Bundesliga	4	0	1	0	—		—		5	0
1899 Hoffenheim	2011–12	Bundesliga	0	0	—		—		—		0	0
1899 Hoffenheim	Total		4	0	1	0	0	0	0	0	5	0
RB Leipzig	2013–14	3. Liga	18	2	0	0	—		—		18	2
RB Leipzig	2014–15	2. Bundesliga	3	1	0	0	—		—		3	1
RB Leipzig	Total		21	3	0	0	0	0	0	0	21	3
SV Ried	2014–15	Austrian Bundesliga	29	10	1	0	—		—		30	10
Lech Poznań	2015–16	Ekstraklasa	13	0	3	0	10 (Note: Four appearances and two goals in UEFA Champions League, six appearances in UEFA Europa League)	3	1 (Note: Appearance in Polish Super Cup)	0	27	3
1. FC Heidenheim (loan)	2015–16	2. Bundesliga	13	4	1	0	—		—		14	4
1. FC Heidenheim	2016–17	2. Bundesliga	29	2	2	1	—		—		31	3
1. FC Heidenheim	2017–18	2. Bundesliga	17	1	1	0	—		—		18	1
1. FC Heidenheim	2018–19	2. Bundesliga	24	8	3	0	—		—		27	8
1. FC Heidenheim	2019–20	2. Bundesliga	14	1	0	0	—		2 (Note: Appearances in promotion playoffs)	0	16	1
1. FC Heidenheim	2020–21	2. Bundesliga	30	5	1	0	—		—		31	5
1. FC Heidenheim	2021–22	2. Bundesliga	15	0	0	0	—		—		15	0
1. FC Heidenheim	2022–23	2. Bundesliga	31	8	1	0	—		—		32	8
1. FC Heidenheim	2023–24	Bundesliga	21	0	2	0	—		—		23	0
1. FC Heidenheim	2024–25	Bundesliga	1	0	2	0	1 (Note: Appearance in UEFA Conference League)	0	—		4	0
1. FC Heidenheim	Total		182	25	12	1	1	0	2	0	197	26
AEL Limassol	2024–25	Cypriot First Division	6	0	1	0	—		—		7	0
AEL Limassol	2025–26	Cypriot First Division	1	0	0	0	—		—		1	0
AEL Limassol	Total		7	0	1	0	0	0	0	0	8	0
Career total			341	62	19	0	11	3	3	0	374	66

== Honours ==
Lech Poznań

- Polish Super Cup: 2015

1. FC Heidenheim

- 2. Bundesliga: 2022–23
