= 2022–23 1. FC Heidenheim season =

1. FC Heidenheim
2022–23 season
- President: Klaus Mayer
- Head coach: Frank Schmidt
- Stadium: Voith-Arena
- 2. Bundesliga: 1st (promoted)
- DFB-Pokal: Second round
- Top goalscorer: League: Tim Kleindienst (25); All: Tim Kleindienst (25)
Home colours	Away colours	Third colours

The 2022–23 season was the 16th in the history of 1. FC Heidenheim and their ninth consecutive season in the second division. The club participated in the 2. Bundesliga and the DFB-Pokal, winning promotion to the Bundesliga for the first time in club history.

== Players ==
As of 5 July 2022

Note: Flags indicate national team as defined under FIFA eligibility rules; some limited exceptions apply. Players may hold more than one non-FIFA nationality.

No.	Pos.	Nation	Player
1	GK	GER	Kevin Müller
2	DF	GER	Marnon Busch
3	MF	GER	Jan Schöppner
4	DF	GER	Tim Siersleben (on loan from VfL Wolfsburg)
6	DF	GER	Patrick Mainka (Captain)
8	MF	GER	Andreas Geipl
9	FW	GER	Stefan Schimmer
10	FW	GER	Tim Kleindienst
11	FW	GER	Denis Thomalla
16	MF	GER	Kevin Sessa
17	MF	GER	Florian Pick
18	DF	GER	Marvin Rittmüller
19	DF	GER	Jonas Föhrenbach
20	MF	GER	Dženis Burnić

No.	Pos.	Nation	Player
21	MF	GER	Adrian Beck
22	GK	GER	Vitus Eicher
23	MF	GER	Merveille Biankadi
24	FW	GER	Christian Kühlwetter
26	MF	GER	Tim Köther
27	DF	GER	Thomas Keller
28	MF	GER	Melvin Ramusovic
30	MF	GER	Norman Theuerkauf
31	MF	GER	Mert Arslan
33	DF	USA	Lennard Maloney
34	GK	AUT	Paul Tschernuth
37	MF	GER	Jan-Niklas Beste
44	FW	KOS	Elidon Qenaj

== Pre-season and friendlies ==
Win Draw Loss

18 June 2022 Friendly	TV Steinheim	0–6	1. FC Heidenheim	Steinheim
17:00 CEST (UTC+2)		Report	Kleindienst 31', 39'; Geipl 40'; Kühlwetter 48', 90'; Schimmer 81'; Negele 90+1'

19 June 2022 Friendly	FC Römerstein	0–27	1. FC Heidenheim	Römerstein
15:30 CEST (UTC+2)		Report	Siersleben 5'; Kleindienst 6', 16', 20', 33'; Kühlwetter 11', 30', 40'; 27' (o.g.); Schöppner 29'; Geipl 32'; Pick 35'; Beste 36' (pen.); Schimmer 46', 49', 57', 65', 72', 73'; Keller 53', 67'; Köther 59', 83'; Qenaj 62', 76', 86', 90'; Mainka 78'; Busch 82'

23 June 2022 Friendly	Schwäbisch Hall	0–6	1. FC Heidenheim	Schwäbisch Hall
18:30 CEST (UTC+2)		Report	Pick 16'; Schimmer 31'; Kleindienst 34'; Köther 68'; Siersleben 72'; Beck 85'	Stadium: Optima Sportpark; Attendance: 1,600

29 June 2022 Friendly	Dynamo Dresden	0–1	1. FC Heidenheim	Angerberg
16:00 CEST (UTC+2)		Report	Burnić 8'	Stadium: Sportplatz Angerberg; Attendance: 200

3 July 2022 Friendly	Universitatea Craiova	1–0	1. FC Heidenheim	Kematen, Austria
11:00 CEST (UTC+2)	Ivan 45' (pen.)	Report		Stadium: Sportplatz Kematen

9 July 2022 Friendly	1899 Hoffenheim	2–0	1. FC Heidenheim	Brackenheim
15:30 CEST (UTC+2)	Kramarić 14'; Kadeřábek 35'	Report	Maloney (yellow card) 75'	Stadium: Wiesentalstadion; Attendance: 1,750

21 September 2022 Friendly	Spfr. Dorfmerkingen	1–2	1. FC Heidenheim	Dorfmerkingen
17:30 CEST (UTC+2)		Report		Stadium: Sportanlange Felsenstraße

16 December 2022 Friendly	FC Augsburg	2–0	1. FC Heidenheim
14:00 CET (UTC+1)	Demirovic 18'; Winther 85'	Report		Referee: Felix Brych

17 December 2022 Friendly	1. FC Heidenheim	2–0	Waldhof Mannheim	Heidenheim
14:00 CET (UTC+1)				Stadium: Voith-Arena

21 December 2022 Friendly	FC Ingolstadt 04	0–1	1. FC Heidenheim	Ingolstadt
13:00 CET (UTC+1)		Report	Kühlwetter 35' (pen.)	Stadium: AUDI Sportpark – Platz 4

24 March 2023 Friendly	VfB Stuttgart	2–0	1. FC Heidenheim	Stuttgart
14:00 CET (UTC+1)	Theuerkauf 49' (o.g.); Anton 55'			Stadium: Robert-Schlienz-Stadion

== Competitions ==
=== Overall record ===
Competition	First match	Last match	Starting round	Final position	Record							
Competition	First match	Last match	Starting round	Final position	Pld	W	D	L	GF	GA	GD	Win %
2. Bundesliga	17 July 2022	28 May 2023	Matchday 1	Winners	34	19	10	5	67	36	+31	55.88
DFB-Pokal	30 July 2022	19 October 2022	First round	Second round	2	1	0	1	2	2	+0	50.00
Total					36	20	10	6	69	38	+31	55.56

Source: Soccerway

=== 2. Bundesliga ===
==== League table ====
Pos	Team	Pld	W	D	L	GF	GA	GD	Pts	Promotion, qualification or relegation
1	1. FC Heidenheim (C, P)	34	19	10	5	67	36	+31	67	Promotion to Bundesliga
2	Darmstadt 98 (P)	34	20	7	7	50	33	+17	67	Promotion to Bundesliga
3	Hamburger SV	34	20	6	8	70	45	+25	66	Qualification for promotion play-offs
4	Fortuna Düsseldorf	34	17	7	10	60	43	+17	58	
5	FC St. Pauli	34	16	10	8	55	39	+16	58	

Source: DFB
Rules for classification: 1) Points; 2) Goal difference; 3) Goals scored; 4) Head-to-head results; 5) Head-to-head away goals scored; 6) Away goals scored; 7) Play-off.
(C) Champions; (P) Promoted

==== Results summary ====
Overall								Home						Away					
Pld	W	D	L	GF	GA	GD	Pts	W	D	L	GF	GA	GD	W	D	L	GF	GA	GD
34	19	10	5	67	36	+31	67	12	4	1	41	16	+25	7	6	4	26	20	+6

Source: DFB

==== Results by round ====
Round	1	2	3	4	5	6	7	8	9	10	11	12	13	14	15	16	17	18	19	20	21	22	23	24	25	26	27	28	29	30	31	32	33	34
Ground	A	H	A	A	H	A	H	A	H	A	H	A	H	A	H	A	H	H	A	H	H	A	H	A	H	A	H	A	H	A	H	A	H	A
Result	W	W	L	W	D	D	W	D	D	D	W	L	W	D	W	W	W	W	L	D	W	W	W	D	W	D	L	W	W	W	D	L	W	W
Position	8	2	4	2	3	4	3	3	5	5	4	4	4	4	3	3	3	3	3	3	3	3	3	3	2	2	3	2	2	2	2	2	2	1

Source: DFB
A = Away; H = Home; W = Win; D = Draw; L = Loss

==== Matches ====
The league fixtures were announced on 17 June 2022.

17 July 2022 1	Hansa Rostock	0–1	1. FC Heidenheim	Rostock
13:30 CEST (UTC+2)		Report	Schimmer 50'	Stadium: Ostseestadion; Attendance: 24,000; Referee: Daniel Siebert

23 July 2022 2	1. FC Heidenheim	3–0	Eintracht Braunschweig	Heidenheim
13:00 CEST (UTC+2)	Strompf 10' (o.g.); Kleindienst 61'; Sessa 90'	Report		Stadium: Voith-Arena; Attendance: 7,088; Referee: Deniz Aytekin

6 August 2022 3	Hamburger SV	1–0	1. FC Heidenheim	Hamburg
13:00 CEST (UTC+2)	Glatzel 42'	Report		Stadium: Volksparkstadion; Attendance: 43,094; Referee: Robert Hartmann

12 August 2022 4	1. FC Nürnberg	0–3	1. FC Heidenheim	Nuremberg
18:30 CEST (UTC+2)		Report	Thomalla 44'; Beck 49'; Beste 80'	Stadium: Max-Morlock-Stadion; Attendance: 27,155; Referee: Florian Lechner

21 August 2022 5	1. FC Heidenheim	1–1	Arminia Bielefeld	Heidenheim
13:30 CEST (UTC+2)	Kleindienst 3'	Report	Hack 10'	Stadium: Voith-Arena; Attendance: 8,395; Referee: Nicolas Winter

27 August 2022 6	SV Darmstadt 98	2–2	1. FC Heidenheim	Darmstadt
13:00 CEST (UTC+2)	Manu 36'; Ronstadt 76'	Report	Mainka 70'; Kleindienst 82'	Stadium: Merck-Stadion am Böllenfalltor; Attendance: 13,280; Referee: Arne Aarnink

2 September 2022 7	1. FC Heidenheim	2–1	Fortuna Düsseldorf	Heidenheim
18:30 CEST (UTC+2)	Beck 22'; Kleindienst 87'	Report	Kownacki 59'	Stadium: Voith-Arena; Attendance: 9,468; Referee: Robert Kampka

10 September 2022 8	Karlsruher SC	0–0	1. FC Heidenheim	Karlsruhe
13:30 CEST (UTC+2)		Report		Stadium: BBBank Wildpark; Attendance: 17,778; Referee: Florian Exner

18 September 2022 9	1. FC Heidenheim	2–2	1. FC Kaiserslautern	Heidenheim
13:00 CEST (UTC+2)	Beste 17'; Busch 44'	Report	Boyd 20', 60'	Stadium: Voith-Arena; Attendance: 11,189; Referee: Tobias Reichel

1 October 2022 10	FC St. Pauli	0–0	1. FC Heidenheim	Hamburg
20:30 CEST (UTC+2)		Report		Stadium: Millerntor-Stadion; Attendance: 29,242; Referee: Sven Waschitzki-Günther

9 October 2022 11	1. FC Heidenheim	2–1	Hannover 96	Heidenheim
13:30 CEST (UTC+2)	Thomalla 32'; Kleindienst 61'	Report	Teuchert 90+2'	Stadium: Voith-Arena; Attendance: 8,104; Referee: Christian Dingert

16 October 2022 12	Holstein Kiel	3–1	1. FC Heidenheim	Kiel
13:30 CEST (UTC+2)	Skrzybski 45', 51'; Wriedt 66'	Report	Thomalla 31'	Stadium: Holstein-Stadion; Attendance: 9,936; Referee: Patrick Alt

23 October 2022 13	1. FC Heidenheim	3–1	Greuther Fürth	Heidenheim
13:30 CEST (UTC+2)	Mainka 9'; Kleindienst 33'; Beste 56' (pen.)	Report	Hrgota 52'	Stadium: Voith-Arena; Attendance: 8,500; Referee: Robin Braun

28 October 2022 14	1. FC Magdeburg	1–1	1. FC Heidenheim	Magdeburg
18:30 CEST (UTC+2)	Ito 90+3'	Report	Thomalla 23'	Stadium: MDCC-Arena; Attendance: 19,352; Referee: Martin Thomsen

5 November 2022 15	1. FC Heidenheim	3–0	SC Paderborn 07	Heidenheim
13:00 CET (UTC+1)	Beste 35', 90+1'; Thomalla 76'	Report		Stadium: Voith-Arena; Attendance: 9,444; Referee: Timo Gerach

9 November 2022 16	SV Sandhausen	3–4	1. FC Heidenheim	Sandhausen
18:30 CET (UTC+1)	Papela 50'; Kinsombi 76'; Esswein 80'	Report	Siersleben 31'; Kleindienst 40'; Kühlwetter 48'; Sessa 73'	Stadium: BWT-Stadion am Hardtwald; Attendance: 3,471; Referee: Richard Hempel

12 November 2022 17	1. FC Heidenheim	5–4	Jahn Regensburg	Heidenheim
13:00 CET (UTC+1)	Kleindienst 21', 39'; Beck 36'; Thomalla 76'; Schimmer 90+4'	Report	Owusu 14'; Makridis 45+1'; Shipnoski 55'; Yildirim 90+2'	Stadium: Voith-Arena; Attendance: 9,695; Referee: Florian Heft

28 January 2023 18	1. FC Heidenheim	2–0	Hansa Rostock	Heidenheim
13:00 CET (UTC+1)	Kleindienst 80'; Pick 88'	Report		Stadium: Voith-Arena; Attendance: 9,627; Referee: Max Bruda

4 February 2023 19	Eintracht Braunschweig	2–0	1. FC Heidenheim	Braunschweig
13:00 CET (UTC+1)	Wintzheimer 72'; Lauberbach 90'	Report		Stadium: Eintracht-Stadion; Attendance: 16,776; Referee: Wolfgang Haslberger

11 February 2023 20	1. FC Heidenheim	3–3	Hamburger SV	Heidenheim
20:30 CET (UTC+1)	Beste 27'; Schöppner 30'; Kleindienst 41'	Report	Németh 72'; Glatzel 79'; Jatta 88'	Stadium: Voith-Arena; Attendance: 15,000; Referee: Deniz Aytekin

19 February 2023 21	1. FC Heidenheim	5–0	1. FC Nürnberg	Heidenheim
13:30 CET (UTC+1)	Kleindienst 18', 23', 38', 81'; Busch 86'	Report		Stadium: Voith-Arena; Attendance: 10,955; Referee: Florian Exner

26 February 2023 22	Arminia Bielefeld	0–1	1. FC Heidenheim	Bielefeld
13:30 CET (UTC+1)		Report	Schimmer 70'	Stadium: Bielefelder Alm; Attendance: 17,251; Referee: Florian Lechner

4 March 2023 23	1. FC Heidenheim	1–0	SV Darmstadt 98	Heidenheim
20:30 CET (UTC+1)	Beste 89'	Report		Stadium: Voith-Arena; Attendance: 12,212; Referee: Robert Schröder

11 March 2023 24	Fortuna Düsseldorf	1–1	1. FC Heidenheim	Düsseldorf
20:30 CET (UTC+1)	Iyoha 27'	Report	Kleindienst 20'	Stadium: Merkur Spiel-Arena; Attendance: 26,827; Referee: Daniel Schlager

17 March 2023 25	1. FC Heidenheim	5–2	Karlsruher SC	Heidenheim
18:30 CET (UTC+1)	Kleindienst 38', 45+1', 49'; Pick 62'; Sessa 88'	Report	Jensen 14'; Kaufmann 23'	Stadium: Voith-Arena; Attendance: 12,975; Referee: Robin Braun

1 April 2023 26	1. FC Kaiserslautern	2–2	1. FC Heidenheim	Kaiserslautern
20:30 CET (UTC+1)	de Preville 90+3'; Hercher 90+5'	Report	Kleindienst 53'; Pick 75'	Stadium: Fritz-Walter-Stadion; Attendance: 41,543; Referee: Robert Hartmann

8 April 2023 27	1. FC Heidenheim	0–1	FC St. Pauli	Heidenheim
20:30 CET (UTC+1)		Report	Hartel 41'	Stadium: Voith-Arena; Attendance: 15,000; Referee: Christian Dingert

14 April 2023 28	Hannover 96	0–3	1. FC Heidenheim	Hannover
18:30 CET (UTC+1)		Report	Beste 31'; Kleindienst 35'; Thomalla 45+4'	Stadium: Heinz von Heiden Arena; Attendance: 25,200; Referee: Florian Exner

23 April 2023 29	1. FC Heidenheim	3–0	Holstein Kiel	Heidenheim
13:30 CET (UTC+1)	Mainka 2'; Kleindienst 68'; Beste 75' (pen.)	Report		Stadium: Voith-Arena; Attendance: 12,026; Referee: Florian Badstübner

28 April 2023 30	Greuther Fürth	0–2	1. FC Heidenheim	Fürth
18:30 CET (UTC+1)		Report	Kleindienst 7'; Beste 51'	Stadium: Sportpark Ronhof Thomas Sommer; Attendance: 11,897; Referee: Felix Zwayer

7 May 2023 31	1. FC Heidenheim	0–0	1. FC Magdeburg	Heidenheim
13:30 CET (UTC+1)		Report		Stadium: Voith-Arena; Attendance: 15,000; Referee: Bastian Dankert

14 May 2023 32	SC Paderborn 07	3–2	1. FC Heidenheim	Paderborn
13:30 CET (UTC+1)	Klefisch 26'; Pieringer 50'; Muslija 52'	Report	Kleindienst 30'; Thomalla 37'	Stadium: Benteler-Arena; Attendance: 11,946; Referee: Daniel Siebert

20 May 2023 33	1. FC Heidenheim	1–0	SV Sandhausen	Heidenheim
13:00 CET (UTC+1)	Beste 68'	Report		Stadium: Voith-Arena; Attendance: 14,500; Referee: Benjamin Brand

28 May 2023 34	Jahn Regensburg	2–3	1. FC Heidenheim	Regensburg
15:30 CET (UTC+1)	Owusu 51', 56'	Report	Saller 58' (o.g.); Beste 90+3' (pen.); Kleindienst 90+9'	Stadium: Jahnstadion; Attendance: 14,189; Referee: Sören Storks

=== DFB-Pokal ===
30 July 2022 First round	Illertissen	0–2	1. FC Heidenheim	Illertissen
15:31 CEST (UTC+2)		Report	Mainka 57'; Beck 80'	Stadium: Voehlin-Stadium; Attendance: 3,500; Referee: Marco Fritz

19 October 2022 Second round	Union Berlin	2–0	1. FC Heidenheim	Berlin
20:45 CEST (UTC+2)	Puchacz 7'; Michel 52'; Knoche (yellow card) 90'	Report	Mainka (yellow card) 29'; Geipl (yellow card) 62'	Stadium: Stadion An der Alten Försterei; Attendance: 20,500; Referee: Florian Badstübner
