= Stefan Schimmer =

German footballer

Personal information
- Date of birth: 28 April 1994 (age 32)
- Place of birth: Wertingen, Germany
- Height: 1.85 m (6 ft 1 in)
- Position: Forward

Team information
- Current team: Buriram United
- Number: 30

Youth career
- –2013: FC Gundelfingen

Senior career*
Years	Team	Apps	(Gls)
2013–2016	FC Gundelfingen		
2016–2017	FC Memmingen	34	(26)
2017–2019	SpVgg Unterhaching	67	(19)
2019–2026	Heidenheim	167	(18)
2026–	Buriram United	0	(0)
- * Club domestic league appearances and goals as of 16 May 2026

Stefan Schimmer (born 28 April 1994) is a German professional footballer who plays as a forward for Thai League 1 club Buriram United.

== Career ==
Schimmer started his career at FC Gundelfingen, before, in 2016, he signed for FC Memmingen. In June 2017, he joined newly-promoted 3. Liga club SpVgg Unterhaching.

On 6 August 2019, Schimmer signed for 2. Bundesliga club 1. FC Heidenheim from SpVgg Unterhaching. He made his debut for Heidenheim on 18 August 2019, coming on as a 64th minute substitute for Marc Schnatterer in a 2–1 away defeat against Dynamo Dresden.

== Career statistics ==
As of match played 16 May 2026

Appearances and goals by club, season and competition
Club	Season	League			Cup		Europe		Other		Total	
Club	Season	Division	Apps	Goals	Apps	Goals	Apps	Goals	Apps	Goals	Apps	Goals
FC Memmingen	2016–17	Regionalliga Bayern	34	26	0	0	—		—		34	26
SpVgg Unterhaching	2017–18	3. Liga	29	4	1	0	—		—		30	4
SpVgg Unterhaching	2018–19	3. Liga	34	13	0	0	—		—		34	13
SpVgg Unterhaching	2019–20	3. Liga	4	2	0	0	—		—		4	2
SpVgg Unterhaching	Total		67	19	1	0	—		—		68	19
1. FC Heidenheim	2019–20	2. Bundesliga	22	6	2	0	—		1 (Note: Appearance in promotion play-offs)	0	25	6
1. FC Heidenheim	2020–21	2. Bundesliga	29	2	1	0	—		—		30	2
1. FC Heidenheim	2021–22	2. Bundesliga	30	3	1	1	—		—		31	4
1. FC Heidenheim	2022–23	2. Bundesliga	32	3	2	0	—		—		34	3
1. FC Heidenheim	2023–24	Bundesliga	16	0	1	1	—		—		17	1
1. FC Heidenheim	2024–25	Bundesliga	13	0	1	1	0	0	—		14	1
1. FC Heidenheim	2025–26	Bundesliga	25	4	1	0	—		—		26	4
1. FC Heidenheim	Total		167	18	9	3	0	0	1	0	177	21
Career total			268	63	10	3	0	0	1	0	279	66
