= Adam Kölle =

German footballer

Personal information
- Date of birth: 28 April 2006 (age 20)
- Place of birth: Tübingen, Germany
- Height: 1.95 m (6 ft 5 in)
- Position: Defender

Team information
- Current team: 1. FC Heidenheim
- Number: 28

Youth career
- TSV Hirschau
- TSG Tübingen
- –2022: Reutlingen 05
- 2022–2025: 1. FC Heidenheim

Senior career*
Years	Team	Apps	(Gls)
2025–	1. FC Heidenheim	5	(1)
- * Club domestic league appearances and goals as of 21:55, 22 November 2025 (UTC)

Adam Kölle (born 28 April 2006) is a German professional footballer who plays as a defender for 2. Bundesliga club 1. FC Heidenheim.

== Club career ==
Born in Tübingen, Kölle's club career began with youth clubs including TSV Hirschau, TSG Tübingen and Reutlingen 05, moving from the latter to 1. FC Heidenheim's academy in 2022.

In April 2025, Kölle signed a professional contract with Heidenheim, valid until 2026. He made his Bundesliga debut on 20 September 2025, as a 79th-minute substitute against Hamburger SV, and scored a consolation goal as Heidenheim lost 2–1. On 30 October 2025, Kölle extended his contract with Heidenheim until 2029.

== Career statistics ==
As of match played 23 August 2026

Appearances and goals by club, season and competition
Club	Season	League			DFB-Pokal		Other		Total	
Club	Season	Division	Apps	Goals	Apps	Goals	Apps	Goals	Apps	Goals
1. FC Heidenheim	2025–26	Bundesliga	5	1	1	0	—		6	1
1. FC Heidenheim	2025–26	2. Bundesliga	0	0	1	0	—		1	0
Career total			5	1	2	0	0	0	7	1
