= Patrick Mainka =

German footballer (born 1994)

Personal information
- Date of birth: 6 November 1994 (age 31)
- Place of birth: Gütersloh, Germany
- Height: 1.94 m (6 ft 4 in)
- Position: Centre-back

Team information
- Current team: 1. FC Heidenheim
- Number: 6

Youth career
- Victoria Clarholz
- –2009: FSC Rheda
- 2009–2013: Arminia Bielefeld

Senior career*
Years	Team	Apps	(Gls)
2012–2014	Arminia Bielefeld II	20	(4)
2013–2014	Arminia Bielefeld	1	(0)
2014–2015	Werder Bremen II	34	(4)
2016–2018	Borussia Dortmund II	86	(9)
2018–	1. FC Heidenheim	271	(18)
- * Club domestic league appearances and goals as of 15:30, 20 September 2026 (UTC)

Patrick Mainka (born 6 November 1994) is a German professional footballer who plays as a centre-back for and captains 2. Bundesliga club 1. FC Heidenheim.

== Career ==
=== Early career ===
Born in Gütersloh, Mainka played youth football for Victoria Clarholz and FSC Rheda before joining Arminia Bielefeld's academy in 2009. Mainka made his debut and only appearance for Arminia Bielefeld on 15 December 2013, coming on as a second half substitute for Marc Lorenz in a 4–1 victory at home to Greuther Fürth.

=== Werder Bremen II ===
Mainka left Arminia Bielefeld in the summer of 2014, joining Werder Bremen II for an undisclosed fee. On 1 August 2014, Mainka made his debut for Werder Bremen II in a 3–3 draw at Eintracht Braunschweig II, before scoring the first goal of his senior career in the following match at home to Schwarz-Weiß Rehden. He made 23 appearances in the league that season, scoring three, before scoring the winning goal in the second leg of the promotion playoff match Borussia Mönchengladbach II to promote Werder Bremen II to the 3. Liga. He made 9 appearances during the 2015–16 season for Werder Bremen II before leaving in January 2016.

=== Borussia Dortmund II ===
Mainka joined Borussia Dortmund II on a two-and-a-half-year contract in January 2016. He made his debut for the club on 6 February 2016 in a 1–1 draw at home to Viktoria Köln, going on to make 18 appearances during the 2015–16 season, scoring once. He remained a regular player over the next two seasons for Borussia Dortmund II, scoring 2 goals in 34 games across the 2016–17 season and 6 goals in 34 games during the 2017–18 season, and he was also captain of Borussia Dortmund II.

=== 1. FC Heidenheim ===
In the summer of 2018, Mainka joined 1. FC Heidenheim on a two-year contract, following the expiration of his contract at Borussia Dortmund. Mainka made his debut for Heidenheim in their second game of the season; a 1–1 draw away at Holstein Kiel. He scored his first goal for Heidenheim on 4 May 2019; a right footed shot in the 60th minute of a 3–2 defeat at home to SV Sandhausen. Across the 2018–19 season, he started 32 of Heidenheim's 34 games, scoring 2 goals. Having been a regular player for Heidenheim in early stages of the 2019–20 season, his contract was extended in November 2019 until the summer of 2024.

In summer 2021, he was made the new captain of Heidenheim. He was part of the Heidenheim team that was promoted to the Bundesliga for the first time in the club's history at the end of the 2022–23 season.

In December 2023, Mainka's contract with the club was extended until 2027. Mainka played every minute of Heidenheim's first two Bundesliga seasons, making him the third ever play to play every minute of two consecutive Bundesliga seasons after Christian Günter and Philipp Lahm.

In August 2025, he again extended his contract until summer 2029.

== Career statistics ==
As of match played 20 September 2026

Appearances and goals by club, season and competition
Club	Season	League			Cup		Other		Total	
Club	Season	Division	Apps	Goals	Apps	Goals	Apps	Goals	Apps	Goals
Arminia Bielefeld II	2012–13	Oberliga Westfalen	20	4	—		—		20	4
Arminia Bielefeld	2013–14	2. Bundesliga	1	0	0	0	—		1	0
Werder Bremen II	2014–15	Regionalliga Nord	25	4	—		—		25	4
Werder Bremen II	2015–16	3. Liga	9	0	—		—		9	0
Werder Bremen II	Total		34	4	—		—		34	4
Borussia Dortmund II	2015–16	Regionalliga West	18	1	—		—		18	1
Borussia Dortmund II	2016–17	Regionalliga West	34	2	—		—		34	2
Borussia Dortmund II	2017–18	Regionalliga West	34	6	—		—		34	6
Borussia Dortmund II	Total		86	9	—		—		86	9
1. FC Heidenheim	2018–19	2. Bundesliga	32	2	4	0	—		36	2
1. FC Heidenheim	2019–20	2. Bundesliga	32	0	2	0	2 (Note: Appearance(s) in Bundesliga promotion Play-offs)	0	36	0
1. FC Heidenheim	2020–21	2. Bundesliga	33	5	1	0	—		34	5
1. FC Heidenheim	2021–22	2. Bundesliga	32	3	1	1	—		33	4
1. FC Heidenheim	2022–23	2. Bundesliga	34	3	2	1	—		36	4
1. FC Heidenheim	2023–24	Bundesliga	34	2	2	0	—		36	2
1. FC Heidenheim	2024–25	Bundesliga	34	1	1	0	9 (Note: Appearances in UEFA Conference League)	1	44	2
1. FC Heidenheim	2025–26	Bundesliga	34	2	2	0	—		36	2
1. FC Heidenheim	2026–27	2. Bundesliga	6	0	1	0	—		7	0
1. FC Heidenheim	Total		271	18	16	2	11	1	298	21
Career total			411	35	16	2	11	1	438	38

== Honours ==
1. FC Heidenheim

- 2. Bundesliga: 2022–23

Individual

- The Athletic Bundesliga Team of the Season: 2023–24
