= Kevin Sessa =

German footballer (born 2000)

Personal information
- Full name: Kevin Simone Sessa
- Date of birth: 6 July 2000 (age 26)
- Place of birth: Fellbach, Germany
- Height: 1.75 m (5 ft 9 in)
- Position: Midfielder

Team information
- Current team: Hertha BSC
- Number: 8

Youth career
- –2014: VfB Stuttgart
- 2014–2015: FSV Waiblingen
- 2015–2017: Stuttgarter Kickers
- 2017–2018: 1. FC Heidenheim

Senior career*
Years	Team	Apps	(Gls)
2018–2024	1. FC Heidenheim	119	(10)
2024–	Hertha BSC	53	(1)
- * Club domestic league appearances and goals as of 18 May 2026

Kevin Simone Sessa (born 6 July 2000) is a German professional footballer who plays as a midfielder for 2. Bundesliga club Hertha BSC.

== Club career ==
On 3 June 2024, Sessa signed a three-year contract with Hertha BSC.

== Personal life ==
Sessa is of Argentine descent through his father. His older brother Nicolás is also a footballer.

== Career statistics ==
As of match played 22 November 2026

Appearances and goals by club, season and competition
Club	Season	League			DFB-Pokal		Other		Total	
Club	Season	Division	Apps	Goals	Apps	Goals	Apps	Goals	Apps	Goals
1. FC Heidenheim	2017–18	2. Bundesliga	2	0	0	0	—		2	0
1. FC Heidenheim	2018–19	2. Bundesliga	2	0	0	0	—		2	0
1. FC Heidenheim	2019–20	2. Bundesliga	2	0	1	0	2 (Note: Appearances in Bundesliga promotion play-offs)	0	5	0
1. FC Heidenheim	2020–21	2. Bundesliga	30	2	0	0	—		30	2
1. FC Heidenheim	2021–22	2. Bundesliga	21	2	0	0	—		21	2
1. FC Heidenheim	2022–23	2. Bundesliga	32	3	2	0	—		34	3
1. FC Heidenheim	2023–24	Bundesliga	30	3	2	0	—		32	3
1. FC Heidenheim	Total		119	10	5	0	—		124	10
Hertha BSC	2024–25	2. Bundesliga	20	0	2	0	0	0	22	0
Hertha BSC	2025–26	2. Bundesliga	21	0	1	0	0	0	9	0
Hertha BSC	2026-27	2. Bundesliga	12	1	2	0	—		14	1
Hertha BSC	Total		53	1	5	0	—		55	1
Career total			172	11	10	0	2	0	182	11
