= Jonas Föhrenbach =

German footballer

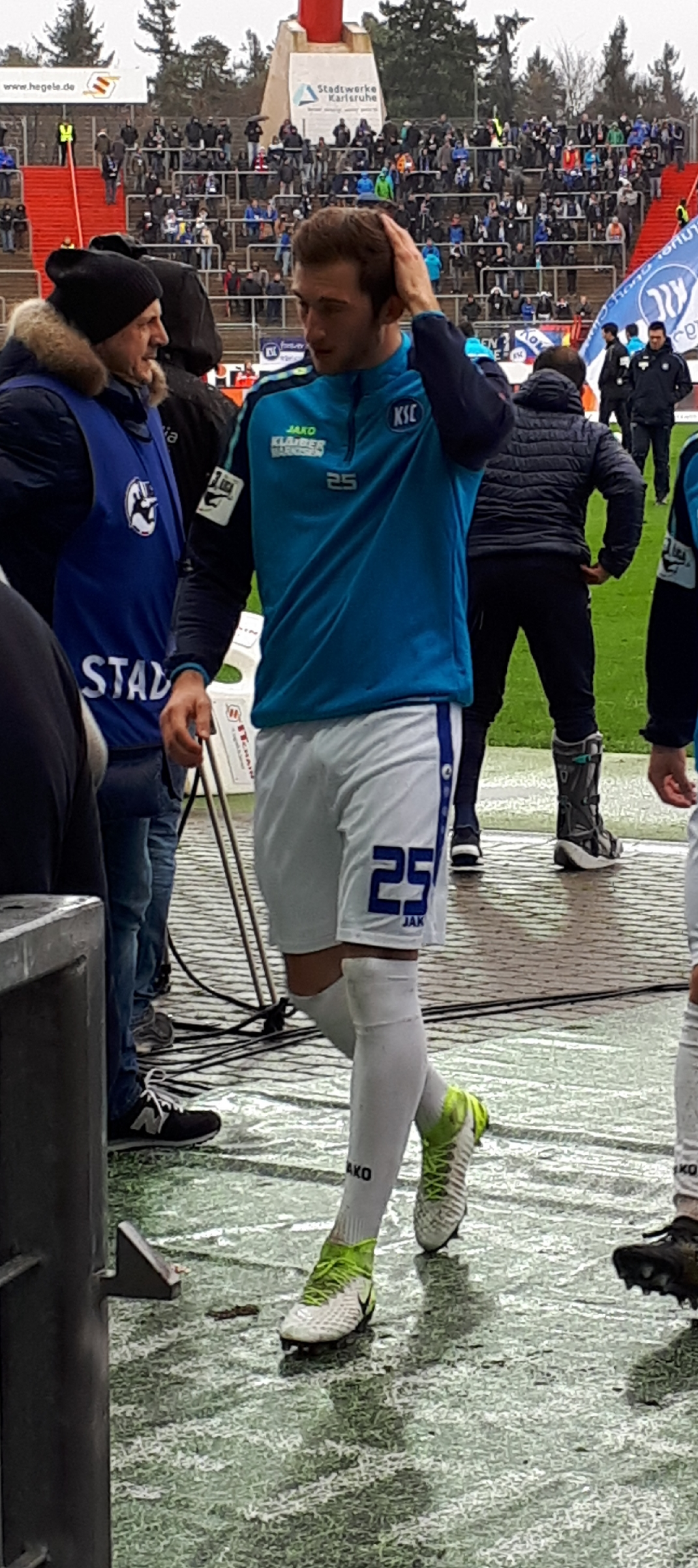
- Föhrenbach with Karlsruher SC in 2018

Personal information
- Date of birth: 26 January 1996 (age 30)
- Place of birth: Freiburg, Germany
- Height: 1.85 m (6 ft 1 in)
- Positions: Centre-back; left-back

Team information
- Current team: 1. FC Heidenheim
- Number: 19

Youth career
- 2001–2009: PSV Freiburg
- 2009–2014: SC Freiburg

Senior career*
Years	Team	Apps	(Gls)
2014–2016	SC Freiburg II	42	(1)
2015–2019	SC Freiburg	11	(1)
2017–2018	→ Karlsruher SC (loan)	36	(3)
2018–2019	→ Jahn Regensburg (loan)	26	(1)
2019–	1. FC Heidenheim	199	(3)

International career^{‡}
2013–2014	Germany U18	7	(0)
2014–2015	Germany U19	11	(1)
- * Club domestic league appearances and goals as of 20 September 2026 ‡ National team caps and goals as of 5 February 2017

Jonas Föhrenbach (born 26 January 1996) is a German professional footballer who plays as a centre-back or left-back for 2. Bundesliga club 1. FC Heidenheim.

== Career ==
Föhrenbach made his first-team debut on 22 August 2015, playing the full 90 minutes in Freiburg's 2–1 win over Fortuna Düsseldorf on matchday 4 of the 2015–16 2. Bundesliga season.

In June 2017, Föhrenbach joined 3. Liga side Karlsruher SC on loan for the 2017–18 season. A year later, he again left Freiburg on loan, joining 2. Bundesliga club SSV Jahn Regensburg for the 2018–19 season. When his loan ended in 2019, he transferred to 1. FC Heidenheim.

Föhrenbach is a youth international footballer for Germany.

He won the Fritz Walter Medal (U18 Bronze) 2014

== Career statistics ==
As of match played 20 September 2026

Appearances and goals by club, season and competition
Club	Season	League			Cup		Europe		Other		Total	
Club	Season	Division	Apps	Goals	Apps	Goals	Apps	Goals	Apps	Goals	Apps	Goals
SC Freiburg II	2014–15	Regionalliga Südwest	12	1	—		—		—		12	1
SC Freiburg II	2015–16	Regionalliga Südwest	15	0	—		—		—		15	0
SC Freiburg II	2016–17	Oberliga Baden-Württemberg	15	0	—		—		—		15	0
SC Freiburg II	Total		42	1	—		—		—		42	1
SC Freiburg	2015–16	2. Bundesliga	8	1	1	0	—		—		9	1
SC Freiburg	2016–17	Bundesliga	3	0	0	0	—		—		3	0
SC Freiburg	Total		11	1	1	0	—		—		12	1
Karlsruher SC (loan)	2017–18	3. Liga	36	3	0	0	—		2 (Note: Appearances in promotion/relegation Playoffs)	0	38	3
Jahn Regensburg (loan)	2018–19	2. Bundesliga	26	1	0	0	—		—		26	1
1. FC Heidenheim	2019–20	2. Bundesliga	25	1	2	0	—		2	0	29	1
1. FC Heidenheim	2020–21	2. Bundesliga	23	0	1	0	—		—		24	0
1. FC Heidenheim	2021–22	2. Bundesliga	25	0	1	0	—		—		26	0
1. FC Heidenheim	2022–23	2. Bundesliga	33	0	2	0	—		—		35	0
1. FC Heidenheim	2023–24	Bundesliga	33	0	2	0	—		—		35	0
1. FC Heidenheim	2024–25	Bundesliga	27	0	1	0	6 (Note: Appearances in UEFA Conference League)	0	—		34	0
1. FC Heidenheim	2025–26	Bundesliga	27	1	2	0	—		—		29	1
1. FC Heidenheim	2026–27	2. Bundesliga	6	1	0	0	—		—		6	1
1. FC Heidenheim	Total		199	3	11	0	6	0	4	0	220	3
Career total			314	9	12	0	6	0	4	0	336	9
