= Norman Theuerkauf =

German footballer

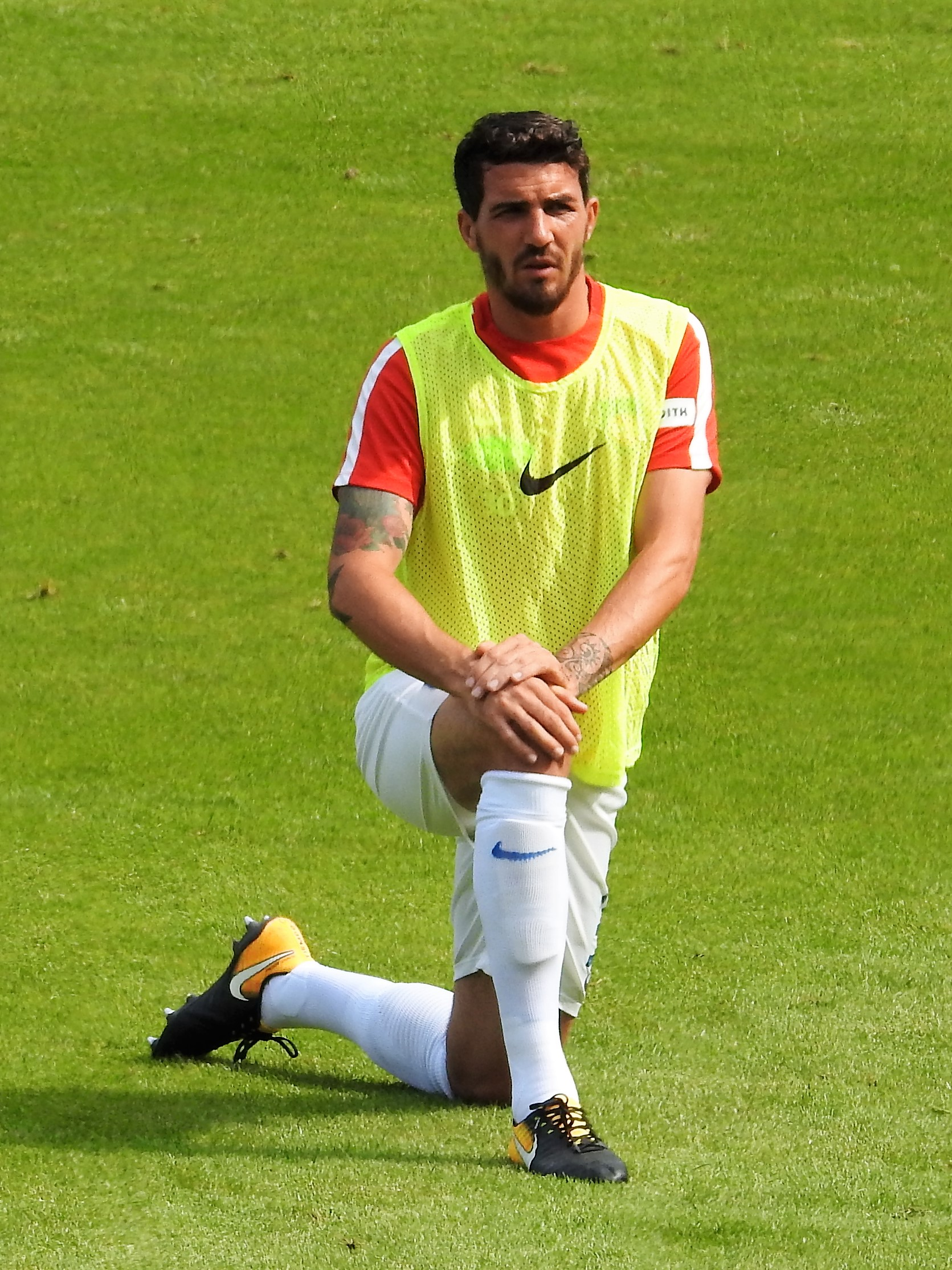
- Theuerkauf warming up with 1. FC Heidenheim in 2017

Personal information
- Date of birth: 24 January 1987 (age 39)
- Place of birth: Nordhausen, East Germany
- Height: 1.83 m (6 ft 0 in)
- Positions: Defensive midfielder; left-back

Youth career
- SV Germania Heringen
- 2000–2003: Carl Zeiss Jena
- 2003–2006: Werder Bremen

Senior career*
Years	Team	Apps	(Gls)
2006–2008	Werder Bremen II	52	(2)
2007–2009	Eintracht Frankfurt II	43	(10)
2009–2015	Eintracht Braunschweig	169	(8)
2010	→ Eintracht Braunschweig II	1	(0)
2015–2025	1. FC Heidenheim	247	(4)

International career
2006	Germany U-19	6	(0)
- * Club domestic league appearances and goals

Norman Theuerkauf (born 24 January 1987) is a German former footballer. Mainly a left-back, he could also play as a centre-back or defensive midfielder.

== Career ==
Theuerkauf started his career with the reserve sides of SV Werder Bremen and Eintracht Frankfurt, before joining Eintracht Braunschweig in the 3. Liga. As one of the club's regular starters he contributed to Eintracht Braunschweig's promotion back to the 2. Bundesliga in 2011, and to the Bundesliga in 2013. After the 2014–15 2. Bundesliga season, Theuerkauf joined 1. FC Heidenheim on a free transfer.

== Career statistics ==
As of 20 February 2025

Appearances and goals by club, season and competition
Club	Season	League			DFB-Pokal		Europe		Other		Total	
Club	Season	Division	Apps	Goals	Apps	Goals	Apps	Goals	Apps	Goals	Apps	Goals
Werder Bremen II	2005–06	Regionalliga Nord	15	1	—		—		—		15	1
Werder Bremen II	2006–07	Regionalliga Nord	30	1	—		—		—		30	1
Werder Bremen II	2007–08	Regionalliga Nord	7	0	—		—		—		7	0
Werder Bremen II	Total		52	2	—		—		—		52	2
Eintracht Frankfurt	2007–08	Bundesliga	0	0	0	0	—		—		0	0
Eintracht Frankfurt II	2007–08	Hessenliga	11	3	—		—		—		11	3
Eintracht Frankfurt II	2008–09	Regionalliga Süd	32	7	—		—		—		32	7
Eintracht Frankfurt II	Total		43	10	—		—		—		43	10
Eintracht Braunschweig	2009–10	3. Liga	26	0	1	0	—		—		27	0
Eintracht Braunschweig	2010–11	3. Liga	31	5	0	0	—		—		31	5
Eintracht Braunschweig	2011–12	2. Bundesliga	28	2	1	0	—		—		29	2
Eintracht Braunschweig	2012–13	2. Bundesliga	31	1	2	0	—		—		33	1
Eintracht Braunschweig	2013–14	Bundesliga	29	0	0	0	—		—		29	0
Eintracht Braunschweig	2014–15	2. Bundesliga	24	0	2	0	—		—		26	0
Eintracht Braunschweig	Total		169	8	6	0	—		—		175	8
Eintracht Braunschweig II	2010–11	Regionalliga Nord	1	0	—		—		—		1	0
1. FC Heidenheim	2015–16	2. Bundesliga	27	1	2	0	—		—		29	1
1. FC Heidenheim	2016–17	2. Bundesliga	24	0	0	0	—		—		24	0
1. FC Heidenheim	2017–18	2. Bundesliga	26	0	3	0	—		—		29	0
1. FC Heidenheim	2018–19	2. Bundesliga	33	0	4	0	—		—		37	0
1. FC Heidenheim	2019–20	2. Bundesliga	32	2	1	0	—		2 (Note: Appearances in Promotion Playoffs)	0	35	2
1. FC Heidenheim	2020–21	2. Bundesliga	24	1	1	0	—		—		25	1
1. FC Heidenheim	2021–22	2. Bundesliga	34	0	1	0	—		—		35	0
1. FC Heidenheim	2022–23	2. Bundesliga	21	0	1	0	—		—		22	0
1. FC Heidenheim	2023–24	Bundesliga	25	0	1	0	—		—		26	0
1. FC Heidenheim	2024–25	Bundesliga	1	0	1	0	10 (Note: Appearances in UEFA Conference League)	1	—		12	1
1. FC Heidenheim	Total		247	4	15	0	10	1	2	0	274	5
Career total			512	24	21	0	10	1	2	0	545	25
