= Diant Ramaj =

German footballer (born 2001)

- Ramaj playing for Copenhagen in 2026

Personal information
- Date of birth: 19 September 2001 (age 25)
- Place of birth: Stuttgart, Germany
- Height: 1.89 m (6 ft 2 in)
- Position: Goalkeeper

Team information
- Current team: Copenhagen (on loan from Borussia Dortmund)
- Number: 41

Youth career
- –2012: SpVgg Cannstatt
- 2012–2015: VfB Stuttgart
- 2015–2018: Stuttgarter Kickers
- 2018–2019: 1. FC Heidenheim

Senior career*
Years	Team	Apps	(Gls)
2019–2021	1. FC Heidenheim	0	(0)
2021–2023	Eintracht Frankfurt	2	(0)
2022	Eintracht Frankfurt II	3	(0)
2023–2024	Jong Ajax	6	(0)
2023–2025	Ajax	23	(0)
2025–	Borussia Dortmund	0	(0)
2025	→ Copenhagen (loan)	12	(0)
2025–2026	→ 1. FC Heidenheim (loan)	31	(0)
2026–	→ Copenhagen (loan)	8	(0)

International career
2018–2019	Germany U18	2	(0)
2019	Germany U19	5	(0)
2020–2021	Germany U20	3	(0)
- * Club domestic league appearances and goals as of 26 October 2026

Diant Ramaj (born 19 September 2001) is a German-Kosovan professional footballer who plays as a goalkeeper for Danish Superliga club Copenhagen, on loan from Bundesliga club Borussia Dortmund.

== Club career ==
=== Early career and 1. FC Heidenheim ===
Ramaj played for Stuttgart clubs as SpVgg Cannstatt, VfB Stuttgart and Stuttgarter Kickers in his youth before moving to 1. FC Heidenheim in 2018. On 21 April 2019, he was named as a senior team substitute for the first time in a league match against St. Pauli. Three months later, Ramaj was officially promoted to the senior team and was the third goalkeeper behind Kevin Müller and Vitus Eicher.

=== Eintracht Frankfurt ===
On 10 May 2021, Ramaj signed his first professional contract with Bundesliga side Eintracht Frankfurt after agreeing to a three-year deal. On 8 August 2021, he was named as an Eintracht Frankfurt substitute for the first time in a DFB-Pokal first round match against Waldhof Mannheim. His debut with Eintracht Frankfurt came on 16 January 2022 in a 1–1 away draw against Augsburg after being named in the starting line-up.

=== Ajax ===
On 3 August 2023, Ramaj signed a five-year contract with Dutch club Ajax. He made his debut playing for the reserves team Jong Ajax in the Eerste Divisie on 25 September 2023 in a 1–1 draw against FC Eindhoven.

=== Borussia Dortmund ===
On 3 February 2025, on transfer deadline day, it was confirmed that Ramaj joined Bundesliga club Borussia Dortmund on a deal until June 2029.

==== Loan to Copenhagen ====
Furthermore, he was immediately loaned to Danish Superliga club F.C. Copenhagen until the end of the season.

==== Loan to Heidenheim ====
On 28 July 2025, Ramaj was loaned by 1. FC Heidenheim.

==== Second loan to Copenhagen ====
On 17 August 2026, Ramaj rejoined Copenhagen on a season-long loan with an option to buy for €5 million.

== International career ==
Since 2018, Ramaj is a former German youth international, having represented the U18, U19 and U20 teams, between 2018 and 2021.

On 25 October 2025, he, along with teammate Arijon Ibrahimović, met with the president of the Football Federation of Kosovo, Agim Ademi, after their Bundesliga match with 1. FC Heidenheim against TSG Hoffenheim, which was seen as a possible indication of both Ramaj and Ibrahimović's interest in representing Kosovo at the senior international level.

== Personal life ==
Ramaj was born in Stuttgart, Germany to Kosovo Albanian parents from Gjakova. His older brother, Dijon Ramaj was also a professional footballer who played as a winger before retiring in 2021.

== Career statistics ==
As of match played 29 October 2026

Appearances and goals by club, season and competition
Club	Season	League			Cup		Europe		Other		Total	
Club	Season	Division	Apps	Goals	Apps	Goals	Apps	Goals	Apps	Goals	Apps	Goals
1. FC Heidenheim	2018–19	2. Bundesliga	0	0	0	0	—		—		1	0
1. FC Heidenheim	2019–20	2. Bundesliga	0	0	0	0	—		0	0	0	0
1. FC Heidenheim	Total		0	0	0	0	—		0	0	0	0
Eintracht Frankfurt	2021–22	Bundesliga	1	0	0	0	0	0	—		1	0
Eintracht Frankfurt	2022–23	Bundesliga	1	0	0	0	0	0	0	0	1	0
Eintracht Frankfurt	Total		2	0	0	0	0	0	0	0	2	0
Jong Ajax	2023–24	Eerste Divisie	2	0	—		—		—		2	0
Ajax	2023–24	Eredivisie	22	0	1	0	8 (Note: Four appearances in UEFA Europa League, four appearances in UEFA Europa Conference League)	0	—		31	0
Ajax	2024–25	Eredivisie	1	0	0	0	0	0	—		1	0
Ajax	Total		23	0	1	0	8	0	—		32	0
Copenhagen (loan)	2024–25	Danish Superliga	12	0	3	0	4 (Note: Appearances in UEFA Conference League)	0	—		17	0
Borussia Dortmund	2025–26	Bundesliga	0	0	0	0	0	0	—		0	0
Borussia Dortmund	2026–27	Bundesliga	0	0	0	0	0	0	0	0	0	0
Borussia Dortmund	Total		0	0	0	0	0	0	0	0	0	0
1. FC Heidenheim (loan)	2025–26	Bundesliga	31	0	2	0	—		—		33	0
Copenhagen (loan)	2026–27	Danish Superliga	8	0	1	0	3	0	—		12	0
Career total			78	0	7	0	15	0	0	0	100	0

== Honours ==
Copenhagen

- Danish Superliga: 2024–25
- Danish Cup: 2024–25
