= Tobias Mohr =

German footballer (born 1995)

Personal information
- Full name: Tobias Mohr
- Date of birth: 24 August 1995 (age 31)
- Place of birth: Aachen, Germany
- Height: 1.82 m (6 ft 0 in)
- Position: Left midfielder

Team information
- Current team: Standard Liège
- Number: 7

Youth career
- 1998–2006: Borussia Brand
- 2006–2014: Alemannia Aachen

Senior career*
Years	Team	Apps	(Gls)
2014–2016	Alemannia Aachen II	36	(5)
2014–2018	Alemannia Aachen	80	(4)
2018–2020	Greuther Fürth	36	(5)
2018–2020	Greuther Fürth II	2	(2)
2020–2022	1. FC Heidenheim	75	(11)
2022–2025	Schalke 04	63	(4)
2025–	Standard Liège	38	(2)
- * Club domestic league appearances and goals as of 31 May 2026

Tobias Mohr (born 24 August 1995) is a German footballer who plays as a left midfielder for Belgian Pro League club Standard Liège.

== Career ==
On 8 June 2022, Mohr agreed to join Schalke 04, newly promoted to the Bundesliga, signing a three-year contract.

== Career statistics ==
As of match played 18 May 2025

Appearances and goals by club, season and competition
Club	Season	League			Cup		Other		Total	
Club	Season	Division	Apps	Goals	Apps	Goals	Apps	Goals	Apps	Goals
Alemannia Aachen II	2013–14	Oberliga Mittelrhein	4	2	—		—		4	2
Alemannia Aachen II	2014–15	Oberliga Mittelrhein	20	3	—		—		20	3
Alemannia Aachen II	2015–16	Oberliga Mittelrhein	12	0	—		—		12	0
Alemannia Aachen II	Total		36	5	—		—		36	5
Alemannia Aachen	2014–15	Regionalliga West	9	0	—		—		9	0
Alemannia Aachen	2015–16	Regionalliga West	21	2	—		—		21	2
Alemannia Aachen	2016–17	Regionalliga West	30	1	—		—		30	1
Alemannia Aachen	2017–18	Regionalliga West	20	1	—		—		20	1
Alemannia Aachen	Total		80	4	—		—		80	4
Greuther Fürth II	2018–19	Regionalliga Bayern	2	2	—		—		2	2
Greuther Fürth	2018–19	2. Bundesliga	19	4	1	0	—		20	4
Greuther Fürth	2019–20	2. Bundesliga	17	1	1	0	—		18	1
Greuther Fürth	Total		36	5	2	0	—		38	5
1. FC Heidenheim	2019–20	2. Bundesliga	16	1	—		1 (Note: Appearance in Bundesliga relegation play-offs)	0	17	1
1. FC Heidenheim	2020–21	2. Bundesliga	26	2	1	0	—		27	2
1. FC Heidenheim	2021–22	2. Bundesliga	33	8	1	0	—		34	8
1. FC Heidenheim	Total		75	11	2	0	1	0	78	11
Schalke 04	2022–23	Bundesliga	18	0	2	0	—		20	0
Schalke 04	2023–24	2. Bundesliga	19	1	2	0	—		21	1
Schalke 04	2024–25	2. Bundesliga	26	3	2	1	—		28	4
Schalke 04	Total		63	4	6	1	—		69	5
Standard Liège	2025–26	Belgian Pro League	0	0	0	0	—		0	0
Career total			292	31	10	1	1	0	303	32
