= Kevin Müller (footballer) =

German footballer (born 1991)

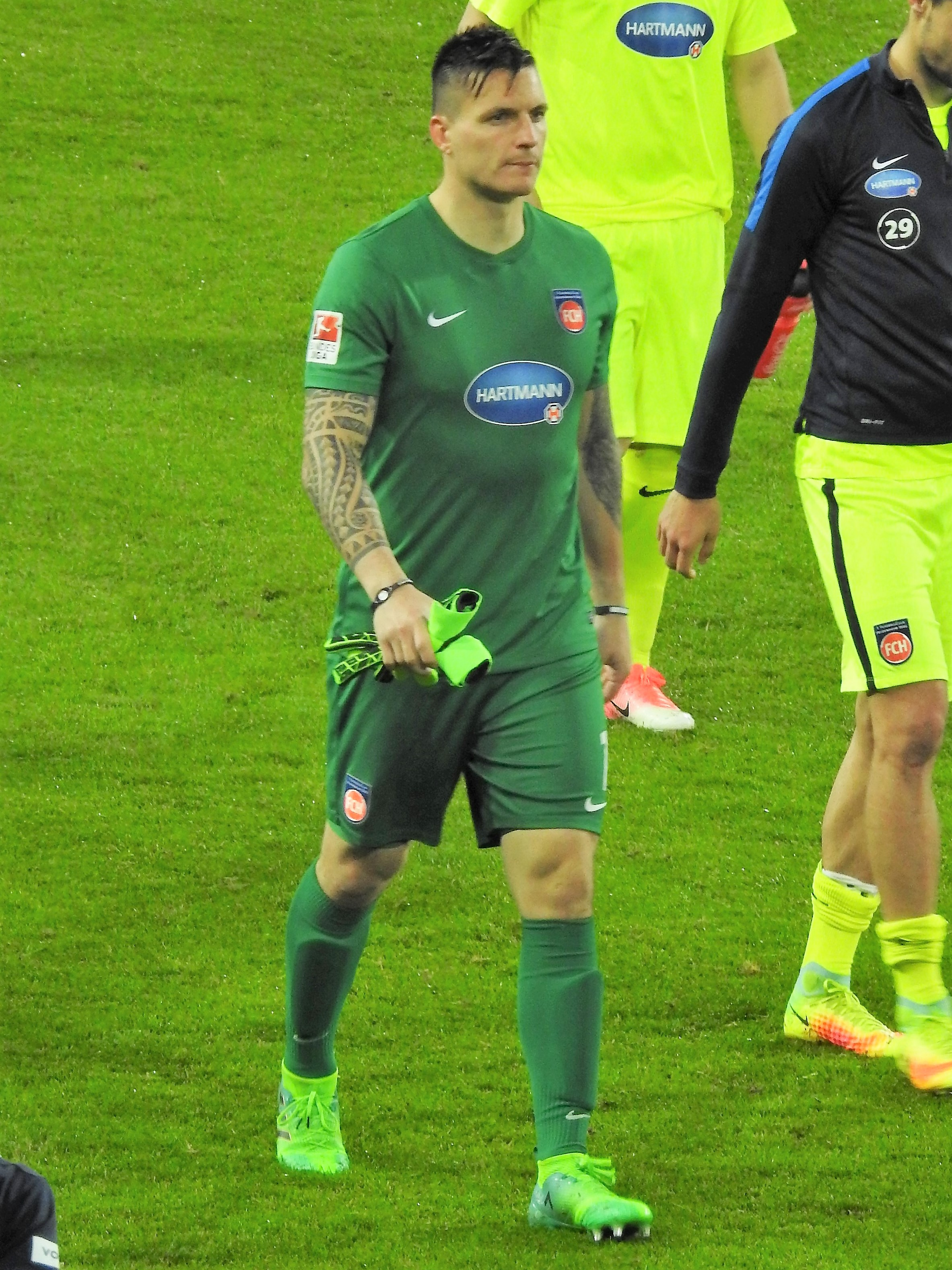
- Müller with 1. FC Heidenheim in 2017

Personal information
- Date of birth: 15 March 1991 (age 35)
- Place of birth: Rostock, Germany
- Height: 1.90 m (6 ft 3 in)
- Position: Goalkeeper

Team information
- Current team: Schalke 04
- Number: 22

Youth career
- 1997–1998: TuSpo Bad Münder
- 1998–2010: Hansa Rostock

Senior career*
Years	Team	Apps	(Gls)
2010–2013	Hansa Rostock	64	(0)
2013–2015	VfB Stuttgart II	15	(0)
2014–2015	→ Energie Cottbus (loan)	37	(0)
2015–2026	1. FC Heidenheim	303	(0)
2026	→ Schalke 04 (loan)	4	(0)
2026–	Schalke 04	1	(0)

International career
2010–2012	Germany U20	7	(0)
- * Club domestic league appearances and goals as of 9 November 2026

Kevin Müller (born 15 March 1991) is a German professional footballer who plays as a goalkeeper for Bundesliga club Schalke 04.

== Career ==
For the 2013–14 season Müller moved to VfB Stuttgart II. On 10 June 2013, he signed a contract until June 2015 with VfB Stuttgart.

On 1 August 2014, Müller joined Energie Cottbus on loan. Simultaneously he extended his contract with Stuttgart until 2016. Cottbus hired him as a replacement for the injured regular goalkeeper René Renno.

For the 2015–16 season he moved to 1. FC Heidenheim. On 20 January 2026, he was loaned to Schalke 04 until the end of the season. On 8 July 2026, the move was made permanent.

== Career statistics ==
As of match played 8 November 2026

Appearances and goals by club, season and competition
Club	Season	League			DFB-Pokal		Europe		Other		Total	
Club	Season	Division	Apps	Goals	Apps	Goals	Apps	Goals	Apps	Goals	Apps	Goals
Hansa Rostock	2010–11	3. Liga	9	0	0	0	—		—		9	0
Hansa Rostock	2011–12	2. Bundesliga	27	0	1	0	—		—		28	0
Hansa Rostock	2012–13	3. Liga	28	0	1	0	—		—		29	0
Hansa Rostock	Total		64	0	2	0	—		—		66	0
VfB Stuttgart II	2013–14	3. Liga	15	0	—		—		—		15	0
Energie Cottbus (loan)	2014–15	3. Liga	37	0	1	0	—		—		38	0
1. FC Heidenheim	2015–16	2. Bundesliga	4	0	4	0	—		—		8	0
1. FC Heidenheim	2016–17	2. Bundesliga	34	0	2	0	—		—		36	0
1. FC Heidenheim	2017–18	2. Bundesliga	31	0	3	0	—		—		34	0
1. FC Heidenheim	2018–19	2. Bundesliga	33	0	4	0	—		—		37	0
1. FC Heidenheim	2019–20	2. Bundesliga	33	0	1	0	—		2 (Note: Appearances in Bundesliga promotion/relegation play-offs)	0	36	0
1. FC Heidenheim	2020–21	2. Bundesliga	33	0	0	0	—		—		33	0
1. FC Heidenheim	2021–22	2. Bundesliga	34	0	1	0	—		—		35	0
1. FC Heidenheim	2022–23	2. Bundesliga	34	0	0	0	—		—		34	0
1. FC Heidenheim	2023–24	Bundesliga	34	0	1	0	—		—		35	0
1. FC Heidenheim	2024–25	Bundesliga	33	0	1	0	6 (Note: Appearances in UEFA Conference League)	0	2	0	42	0
1. FC Heidenheim	2025–26	Bundesliga	0	0	0	0	—		—		0	0
1. FC Heidenheim	Total		303	0	17	0	6	0	4	0	330	0
Schalke 04 (loan)	2025–26	2. Bundesliga	4	0	—		—		—		4	0
Schalke 04	2026–27	Bundesliga	1	0	0	0	—		—		1	0
Schalke 04	Total		5	0	0	0	—		—		5	0
Career total			424	0	20	0	6	0	4	0	454	0

== Honours ==
1. FC Heidenheim

- 2. Bundesliga: 2022–23

Schalke 04

- 2. Bundesliga: 2025–26
