= Marc Schnatterer =

German footballer

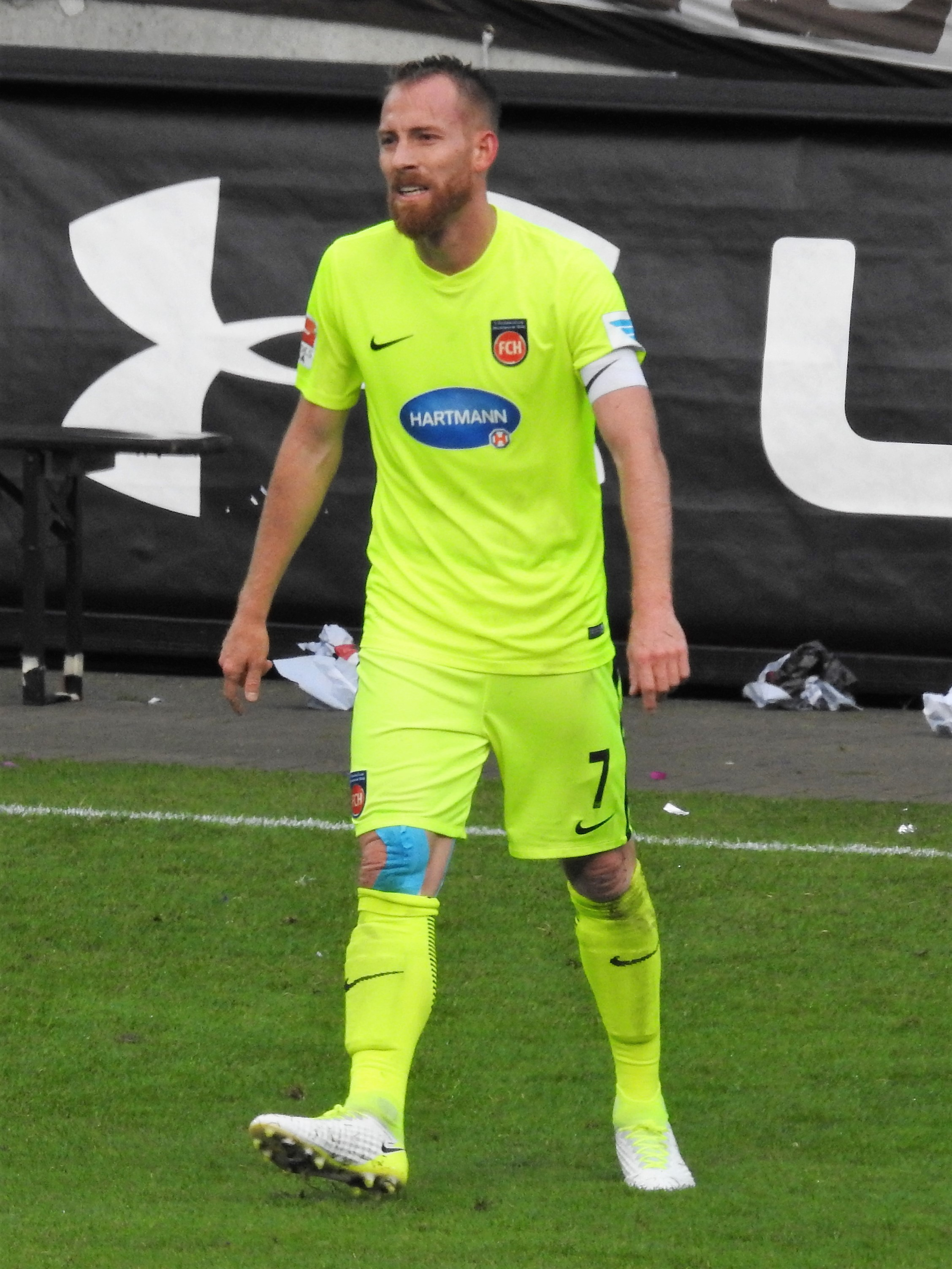
- Schnatterer playing for 1. FC Heidenheim in 2017

Personal information
- Date of birth: 18 November 1985 (age 40)
- Place of birth: Heilbronn, West Germany
- Height: 1.80 m (5 ft 11 in)
- Position: Attacking midfielder

Team information
- Current team: 1. FC Heidenheim (U19 assistant coach)

Youth career
- TSV Bönnigheim
- –2004: SGV Freiberg

Senior career*
| Years | Team | Apps | (Gls) |
| 2004–2006 | SGV Freiberg | 69 | (14) |
| 2006–2008 | Karlsruher SC II | 37 | (2) |
| 2008–2021 | 1. FC Heidenheim | 434 | (113) |
| 2021–2023 | Waldhof Mannheim | 58 | (13) |

Managerial career
- 2023–: 1. FC Heidenheim (U19 assistant)
- * Club domestic league appearances and goals

Marc Schnatterer (born 18 November 1985) is a German professional football coach and a former player. He is an assistant coach with the Under-19 squad of 1. FC Heidenheim.

== Career ==
He's played since 2008 starting as attacking midfielder for German club 1. FC Heidenheim 1846. In the season 2010–11 he was the second best scorer of the team. In the 2011–12 season Schnatterer was the best player in the third division. His contract at FC Heidenheim was extended until 2015.
