= Christian Kühlwetter =

German footballer

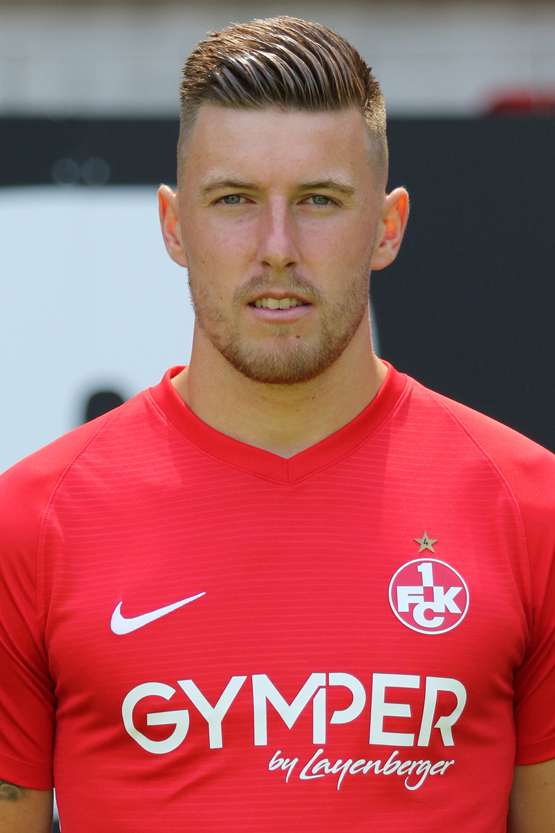
- Kühlwetter in 2019

Personal information
- Date of birth: 21 April 1996 (age 30)
- Place of birth: Bonn, Germany
- Height: 1.82 m (6 ft 0 in)
- Position: Forward

Team information
- Current team: 1. FC Saarbrücken

Youth career
- –2007: FC Rot-Weiss Lessenich
- 2007–2015: 1. FC Köln

Senior career*
Years	Team	Apps	(Gls)
2014–2016	1. FC Köln II	36	(4)
2016–2018	1. FC Kaiserslautern II	60	(26)
2018–2020	1. FC Kaiserslautern	63	(26)
2020–2024	1. FC Heidenheim	89	(18)
2024–2026	Jahn Regensburg	53	(7)
2026–	1. FC Saarbrücken	0	(0)
- * Club domestic league appearances and goals as of 19:45, 18 May 2026 (UTC)

Christian Kühlwetter (born 21 April 1996) is a German professional footballer who plays as a forward for 3. Liga team 1. FC Saarbrücken.

== Career ==
In summer 2020, Kühlwetter, along with teammate Florian Pick, joined 2. Bundesliga side 1. FC Heidenheim from 3. Liga club 1. FC Kaiserslautern. In summer 2026, he moved from SSV Jahn Regensburg to 1. FC Saarbrücken
