= 2021–22 1. FC Heidenheim season =

1. FC Heidenheim
2021–22 season
- President: Klaus Mayer
- Manager: Frank Schmidt
- Stadium: Voith-Arena
- 2. Bundesliga: 6th
- DFB-Pokal: First round
- Top goalscorer: League: Tim Kleindienst (10); All: Tim Kleindienst (10)
- Highest home attendance: 11,250 (vs. Werder Bremen, 12 March 2022)

The 2021–22 season was 1. FC Heidenheim's 15th season in existence and the club's 8th consecutive season in the 2. Bundesliga, the second tier of German football. The club also participated in the DFB-Pokal.

== Background and pre-season ==
1. FC Heidenheim finished the 2020–21 season in 8th place, 11 points below the automatic promotion places and 13 points below the promotion play-off place.

== Friendly matches ==
Friendly match details
Date	Time	Opponent	Venue	Result F–A	Scorers	Attendance	Ref.

== Competitions ==
=== 2. Bundesliga ===
==== League table ====
Pos	Team	Pld	W	D	L	GF	GA	GD	Pts
4	Darmstadt 98	34	18	6	10	71	46	+25	60
5	FC St. Pauli	34	16	9	9	61	46	+15	57
6	1. FC Heidenheim	34	15	7	12	43	45	−2	52
7	SC Paderborn	34	13	12	9	56	44	+12	51
8	1. FC Nürnberg	34	14	9	11	49	49	0	51

Source: DFB
Rules for classification: 1) Points; 2) Goal difference; 3) Goals scored; 4) Head-to-head points; 5) Head-to-head goal difference; 6) Head-to-head away goals scored; 7) Away goals scored; 8) Play-off.

==== Matches ====
2. Bundesliga match details
Match	Date	Time	Opponent	Venue	Result F–A	Scorers	Attendance	League position	Ref.
1	24 July 2021	13:30	SC Paderborn	Home	0–0	—	3,954	9th	
2	31 July 2021	13:30	FC Ingolstadt	Away	2–1	Schmidt 73', Kleindienst 75'	3,360	7th	
3	15 August 2021	13:30	Hansa Rostock	Home	1–1	Kleindienst 68'	5,400	7th	
4	20 August 2021	18:30	Hannover 96	Away	0–1	—	8,600	8th	
5	28 August 2021	13:30	Hamburger SV	Home	0–0	—	7,500	11th	
6	12 September 2021	13:30	Dynamo Dresden	Home	2–1	Mohr 5', Leipertz 90'	6,342	10th	
7	18 September 2021	13:30	SV Sandhausen	Away	3–1	Hüsing 15', Kleindienst 36', Mainka 86'	3,081	5th	
8	24 September 2021	18:30	SV Darmstadt 98	Home	2–1	Mohr 40' pen., Schimmer 84'	5,095	3rd	
9	1 October 2021	18:30	Werder Bremen	Away	0–3	—	30,000	6th	
10	16 October 2021	13:30	FC St. Pauli	Home	2–4	Mohr 4', Kleindienst 85'	8,013	9th	
11	23 October 2021	13:30	1. FC Nürnberg	Away	0–4	—	23,056	11th	
12	29 October 2021	18:30	Schalke 04	Home	1–0	Hüsing 89'	10,000	8th	
13	7 November 2021	13:30	Erzgebirge Aue	Away	0–2	—	6,899	9th	
14	21 November 2021	13:30	Holstein Kiel	Home	2–1	Kühlwetter 1', Leipertz 85'	5,021	8th	
15	26 November 2021	18:30	Fortuna Düsseldorf	Away	1–0	Leipertz 90+2'	13,873	8th	
16	5 December 2021	13:30	Jahn Regensburg	Home	3–0	Kühlwetter 23', Leipertz 77', Schöppner 90+2'	750	6th	
17	12 December 2021	13:30	Karlsruher SC	Away	2–3	Kleindienst 6', 73'	750	8th	
18	18 December 2021	13:30	SC Paderborn	Away	2–1	Mainka 64', Kleindienst 81'	2,500	6th	
19	16 January 2022	13:30	FC Ingolstadt	Home	2–1	Leipertz 30', Mohr 51'	500	3rd	
20	22 January 2022	13:30	Hansa Rostock	Away	0–0		0	6th	
21	4 February 2022	18:30	Hannover 96	Home	3–1	Hult 4' o.g., Mohr 33', 48'	4,350	6th	
22	12 February 2022	13:30	Hamburger SV	Away	0–2		10,000	6th	
23	18 February 2022	18:30	Dynamo Dresden	Away	1–1	Schimmer 55'	6,792	6th	
24	27 February 2022	13:30	SV Sandhausen	Home	1–1	Mohr 27' pen.	5,961	7th	
25	4 March 2022	18:30	SV Darmstadt 98	Away	2–3	Kühlwetter 17', Leipertz 61'	11,692	7th	
26	12 March 2022	20:30	Werder Bremen	Home	2–1	Kühlwetter 38', Schimmer 63'	11,250	6th	
27	18 March 2022	18:30	FC St. Pauli	Away	0–1		27,433	7th	
28	3 April 2022	13:30	1. FC Nürnberg	Home	3–1	Kleindienst 3', 84', Malone 36'	10,673	7th	
29	9 April 2022	13:30	Schalke 04	Away	0–3		57,126	7th	
30	17 April 2022	13:30	Erzgebirge Aue	Home	0–2	Zolinski 54', 79'	7,768	7th	
31	23 April 2022	13:30	Holstein Kiel	Away	1–1	Kleindienst 71'	10,445	8th	
32	29 April 2022	18:30	Fortuna Düsseldorf	Home	1–3	Malone 47'	7,778	8th	
33	7 May 2022	13:30	Jahn Regensburg	Away	2–0	Mainka 51', Mohr 81'	10,175	8th	
34	15 May 2022	15:30	Karlsruher SC	Home	2–0	Sessa 38', 42'	10,599	6th	

=== DFB-Pokal ===
DFB-Pokal match details
Round	Date	Time	Opponent	Venue	Result F–A	Scorers	Attendance	Ref.
First round	8 August 2021	18:30	Hansa Rostock	Away	2–3 (a.e.t.)	Mainka 25', Schimmer 108'	15,000	
