= 2022–23 Eintracht Braunschweig season =

Eintracht Braunschweig
2022–23 season
- Chairman: Sebastian Ebel
- Sporting director: Peter Vollmann
- Coach: Michael Schiele
- Stadium: Eintracht-Stadion
- 2. Bundesliga: 15th
- DFB-Pokal: Second round
- Top goalscorer: League: Anthony Ujah (10); All: Anthony Ujah; Pherai (10 each)
- Highest home attendance: 23,325
- Lowest home attendance: 16,731
- Average home league attendance: 19,308
- Biggest win: 4–2 against Nürnberg
- Biggest defeat: 5–1 against Paderborn
Home colours	Away colours

The 2022–23 season was the 128th season in the history of Eintracht Braunschweig and their first season back in the second division. The club participated in the 2. Bundesliga and DFB-Pokal.

== Players ==
=== First-team squad ===
As of 24 January 2023

Note: Flags indicate national team as defined under FIFA eligibility rules; some limited exceptions apply. Players may hold more than one non-FIFA nationality.

No.	Pos.	Nation	Player
1	GK	GER	Ron-Thorben Hoffmann
3	DF	SUI	Saulo Decarli
4	MF	GER	Jannis Nikolaou
5	DF	GER	Philipp Strompf
6	MF	GER	Bryan Henning
7	MF	GER	Maurice Multhaup
8	MF	GER	Mehmet Ibrahimi (on loan from RB Leipzig)
9	FW	GER	Manuel Wintzheimer (on loan from Nürnberg)
10	MF	NED	Immanuel Pherai
11	FW	GER	Luc Ihorst
13	FW	GER	Tarsis Bonga
14	FW	NGR	Anthony Ujah
15	DF	BEL	Nathan de Medina
16	GK	BIH	Jasmin Fejzić (captain)
18	DF	CRO	Filip Benković (on loan from Udinese)

No.	Pos.	Nation	Player
19	DF	GER	Anton Donkor
20	FW	GER	Lion Lauberbach
21	FW	JPN	Keita Endo (on loan from Union Berlin)
22	MF	VEN	Enrique Peña Zauner
23	MF	GER	Danilo Wiebe
25	MF	GER	Emil Kischka
26	DF	GER	Jan-Hendrik Marx
27	DF	GER	Niko Kijewski
29	DF	TUR	Hasan Kuruçay
30	DF	GER	Brian Behrendt
35	GK	GER	Lennart Schulze Kökelsum
37	MF	GER	Fabio Kaufmann
39	MF	GER	Robin Krauße
44	DF	GER	Linus Gechter (on loan from Hertha BSC)

=== Out on loan ===
Note: Flags indicate national team as defined under FIFA eligibility rules; some limited exceptions apply. Players may hold more than one non-FIFA nationality.

No.	Pos.	Nation	Player
—	GK	GER	Yannik Bangsow (at Alemannia Aachen until 30 June 2023)

== Transfers ==
=== In ===
Date	Position	Name	From	Fee	Ref.
3 June 2022	DF	Saulo Decarli	VfL Bochum		
8 June 2022	DF	Anton Donkor	Waldhof Mannheim		
12 June 2022	FW	Luc Ihorst	Werder Bremen II		
15 June 2022	GK	Ron-Thorben Hoffmann	Bayern Munich	Undisclosed	
23 June 2022	MF	Immanuel Pherai	Borussia Dortmund II		
23 June 2022	FW	Fabio Kaufmann	Karlsruher SC		
2 August 2022	FW	Anthony Ujah	Union Berlin	Free transfer	
1 September 2022	DF	Nathan de Medina	Arminia Bielefeld		
24 January 2023	FW	Tarsis Bonga	VfL Bochum		
24 January 2023	DF	Hasan Kuruçay	HamKam		

=== Loans in ===
Date from	Position	Name	From	Date until	Ref.
27 June 2022	MF	Mehmet Ibrahimi	RB Leipzig	End of season	
19 July 2022	FW	Keita Endo	Union Berlin	End of season	
1 September 2022	DF	Filip Benković	Udinese	End of season	
7 December 2022	DF	Linus Gechter	Hertha BSC	End of season	
7 January 2023	FW	Manuel Wintzheimer	1. FC Nürnberg	End of season	

=== Out ===
Date	Position	Name	To	Fee	Ref.
30 June 2022	GK	Julian Bauer	1. FC Saarbrücken	Released	
30 June 2022	MF	Martin Kobylański	1860 Munich	Released	
30 June 2022	MF	Iba May	free agent	Released	
30 June 2022	DF	Lasse Schlüter	free agent	Released	
23 June 2022	DF	Jannis Kleeberg	Berliner AK 07		
12 January 2023	DF	Michael Schultz	Viktoria Köln	Undisclosed	

=== Loans out ===
Date from	Position	Name	To	Date until	Ref.
22 June 2022	GK	Yannik Bangsow	Alemannia Aachen	End of season	

== Pre-season and friendlies ==
Win Draw Loss

17 June 2022 Friendly	FC Wenden (Germany)	0–12	(Germany) Eintracht Braunschweig
18:00 CEST (UTC+2)		Report	Multhaup 14'; Henning 20', 27'; Girth 23' (pen.), 25', 44'; Nikolaou 65'; Schultz 72'; Peña Zauner 75', 90'; Lauberbach 86'; Wiebe 89'

18 June 2022 Friendly	Polizei SV Braunschweig (Germany)	0–16	(Germany) Eintracht Braunschweig
18:00 CEST (UTC+2)		Report	Peña Zauner 7'; Mbom 15'; Marx 17', 36'; Schultz 29'; Multhaup 33' (pen.); Kischka 45'; Suzuki 47'; Girth 55'; Henning 58'; Donkor 59'; Krauße 61', 70'; Hungler 62'; Lauberbach 63'; Görlich 81'

21 June 2022 Friendly	MTV Groß Denkte (Germany)	0–17	(Germany) Eintracht Braunschweig
18:00 CEST (UTC+2)		Report	Lauberbach 7' (pen.), 20', 29' (pen.); Marx 15'; Otto 18', 32', 41'; Multhaup 48', 74'; Girth 60', 61', 83', 84', 88'; Schultz 63'; Strompf 67'; Wiebe 73'

25 June 2022 Friendly	FT Braunschweig (Germany)	0–5	(Germany) Eintracht Braunschweig
15:00 CEST (UTC+2)		Report	Otto 12'; Girth 28', 42'; Peña Zauner 51'; Pherai 56'

28 June 2022 Friendly	Eintracht Braunschweig (Germany)	1–0	(Germany) SC Freiburg II	Oberkirch
15:30 CEST (UTC+2)				Stadium: Renchtal-Stadion

1 July 2022 Friendly	Eintracht Braunschweig (Germany)	0–1	(Luxembourg) Swift Hesperange
17:30 CEST (UTC+2)		Report	Morabit 59'

6 July 2022 Friendly	Eintracht Braunschweig (Germany)	1–0	(Germany) Union Berlin	Braunschweig
18:00 CEST (UTC+2)	Pherai 55'			Stadium: Eintracht-Stadion; Attendance: 4,432

9 July 2022 Friendly	Rot-Weiß Essen (Germany)	2–2 (a.e.t.)	(Germany) Eintracht Braunschweig	Schöningen
15:30 CEST (UTC+2)	Dürholtz 31'; Young 85'	Report	Kaufmann 95'; Lauberbach 103'	Stadium: Elmstadion

22 September 2022 Friendly	Eintracht Braunschweig (Germany)	7–0	(Germany) Holstein Kiel	Rotenburg an der Wümme
14:00 CEST (UTC+2)	Lauberbach 7', 35', 58', 69'; Peña Zauner 45'; Pherai 47', 60+1'			Stadium: Stadion In der Ahe; Attendance: 0

7 December 2022 Friendly	Hertha BSC (Germany)	1–0	(Germany) Eintracht Braunschweig	Berlin
13:00 CET (UTC+1)	Ejuke 56'	Report		Stadium: Hanns-Braun-Stadion; Attendance: 400; Referee: Alexander Sather

8 January 2023 Friendly	Eintracht Braunschweig (Germany)	3–1	(Germany) Hallescher FC	Braunschweig
14:00 CET (UTC+1)	Ujah 10', 32'; Peña Zauner 67'	Report	Steczyk 23'	Stadium: B-Platz Eintracht-Stadion; Attendance: 0

12 January 2023 Friendly	Eintracht Braunschweig (Germany)	2–0	(Germany) VSG Altglienicke	Braunschweig
12:30 CET (UTC+1)	Decarli 3'; Wintzheimer 52'	Report		Stadium: Eintracht-Stadion; Attendance: 0

23 March 2023 Friendly	Hamburger SV (Germany)	1–2	(Germany) Eintracht Braunschweig	Hamburg
12:20 CET (UTC+1)	Kittel 88'	Report	Wintzheimer 12'; Kijewski 19'	Stadium: Volksparkstadion; Attendance: 0

12 April 2023 Friendly	Eintracht Braunschweig (Germany)	2–3	(Germany) Hamburger SV II	Braunschweig
12:00 CEST (UTC+2)	Peña Zauner 65'; Wintzheimer 78'	Report	Sanne 69', 90'; Burmeister 88'	Stadium: Eintracht-Stadion Nebenplatz 1 Attendance: 110

== Competitions ==
=== Overall record ===
Competition	First match	Last match	Starting round	Final position	Record							
Competition	First match	Last match	Starting round	Final position	Pld	W	D	L	GF	GA	GD	Win %
2. Bundesliga	17 July 2022	28 May 2023	Matchday 1	Matchday 34	34	9	9	16	42	59	−17	26.47
DFB-Pokal	31 July 2022	18 October 2022	First round	Second Round	2	0	1	1	5	6	−1	0.00
Total					36	9	10	17	47	65	−18	25.00

Source: Soccerway

=== 2. Bundesliga ===
==== League table ====
Pos	Team	Pld	W	D	L	GF	GA	GD	Pts	Promotion, qualification or relegation
13	Hansa Rostock	34	12	5	17	32	48	−16	41	
14	1. FC Nürnberg	34	10	9	15	32	49	−17	39	
15	Eintracht Braunschweig	34	9	9	16	42	59	−17	36	
16	Arminia Bielefeld (R)	34	9	7	18	50	62	−12	34	Qualification for relegation play-offs
17	Jahn Regensburg (R)	34	8	7	19	34	58	−24	31	Relegation to 3. Liga

Source: DFB
Rules for classification: 1) Points; 2) Goal difference; 3) Goals scored; 4) Head-to-head results; 5) Head-to-head away goals scored; 6) Away goals scored; 7) Play-off.
(R) Relegated

==== Results summary ====
Overall								Home						Away					
Pld	W	D	L	GF	GA	GD	Pts	W	D	L	GF	GA	GD	W	D	L	GF	GA	GD
34	9	9	16	42	59	−17	36	7	3	7	23	22	+1	2	6	9	19	37	−18

Source: DFB

==== Results by round ====
Round	1	2	3	4	5	6	7	8	9	10	11	12	13	14	15	16	17	18	19	20	21	22	23	24	25	26	27	28	29	30	31	32	33	34
Ground	H	A	H	A	H	A	H	A	H	A	H	A	H	A	H	A	H	A	H	A	H	A	H	A	H	A	H	A	H	A	H	A	H	A
Result	L	L	L	L	D	L	W	D	W	D	W	W	D	D	L	D	L	L	W	L	L	L	D	L	W	D	W	W	L	L	W	D	L	L
Position	16	17	18	18	18	18	18	17	16	16	12	11	11	11	11	11	14	16	11	14	14	15	15	17	16	15	15	12	14	14	13	14	14	15

Source: DFB
A = Away; H = Home; W = Win; D = Draw; L = Loss

==== Matches ====
The league fixtures were announced on 17 June 2022.

17 July 2022 1	Eintracht Braunschweig	0–2	Hamburger SV	Braunschweig
13:30 CEST (UTC+2)		Report	Glatzel 67', 76'	Stadium: Eintracht-Stadion; Attendance: 21,900; Referee: Timo Gerach

23 July 2022 2	1. FC Heidenheim	3–0	Eintracht Braunschweig	Heidenheim
13:00 CEST (UTC+2)	Strompf 10' (o.g.); Kleindienst 61'; Sessa 89'		https://www.kicker.de/heidenheim-gegen-braunschweig-2022-bundesliga-4781750/spielinfo	Stadium: Voith-Arena; Attendance: 7,088; Referee: Deniz Aytekin

7 August 2022 3	Eintracht Braunschweig	0–1	Darmstadt 98	Braunschweig
13:30 CEST (UTC+2)		Report	Vilhelmssen 86'	Stadium: Eintracht-Stadion; Attendance: 16,731; Referee: Max Burda

13 August 2022 4	Holstein Kiel	3–0	Eintracht Braunschweig	Kiel
13:00 CEST (UTC+2)	Skrzybski 12', 73'; Pichler 82'	Report		Stadium: Holstein-Stadion; Attendance: 11,575; Referee: Wolfgang Haslberger

20 August 2022 5	Eintracht Braunschweig	2–2	Fortuna Düsseldorf	Braunschweig
20:30 CEST (UTC+2)	Krauße 56'; Donkor 70'	Report	Gavory 61'; Sobottka 71'	Stadium: Eintracht-Stadion; Attendance: 17,471; Referee: Bastian Dankert

26 August 2022 6	Arminia Bielefeld	4–1	Eintracht Braunschweig	Bielefeld
18:30 CEST (UTC+2)	Lasme 30'; Hüsing 36'; Hack 39'; Okugawa 69'	Report	Pherai 58'	Stadium: Schüco-Arena; Attendance: 18,057; Referee: Benjamin Cortus

2 September 2022 7	Eintracht Braunschweig	4–2	1. FC Nürnberg	Braunschweig
18:30 CEST (UTC+2)	Kaufmann 13', 61'; Ujah 44'; Pherai 59'	Report	Castrop 10'; Duah 29'	Stadium: Eintracht-Stadion; Attendance: 17,173; Referee: Patrick Alt

10 September 2022 8	Hannover 96	1–1	Eintracht Braunschweig	Hannover
13:00 CEST (UTC+2)	Nielsen 77'	Report	Ujah 69'	Stadium: Heinz von Heiden Arena; Attendance: 42,000; Referee: Patrick Ittrich

16 September 2022 9	Eintracht Braunschweig	2–1	Karlsruher SC	Braunschweig
18:30 CEST (UTC+2)	Ujah 44', 72'	Report	Wanitzek 54'	Stadium: Eintracht-Stadion; Attendance: 17,307; Referee: Robin Braun

2 October 2022 10	1. FC Kaiserslautern	1–1	Eintracht Braunschweig	Kaiserslautern
18:30 CEST (UTC+2)	Tomiak 55'	Report	Lauberbach 52'	Stadium: Fritz-Walter-Stadion; Attendance: 36,332; Referee: Robert Schröder

8 October 2022 11	Eintracht Braunschweig	2–1	FC St. Pauli	Braunschweig
13:00 CEST (UTC+2)	Pherai 78', 90+4'	Report	Saliakas 68'	Stadium: Eintracht-Stadion; Attendance: 21,000; Referee: Sascha Stegemann

15 October 2022 12	1. FC Magdeburg	0–2	Eintracht Braunschweig	Magdeburg
13:00 CEST (UTC+2)		Report	Condé 51' (o.g.); Henning 90+5'	Stadium: MDCC-Arena; Attendance: 25,601; Referee: Martin Petersen

22 October 2022 13	Eintracht Braunschweig	0–0	SC Paderborn 07	Braunschweig
13:00 CEST (UTC+2)		Report		Stadium: Eintracht-Stadion; Attendance: 16,844; Referee: Florian Lechner

30 October 2022 14	SV Sandhausen	2–2	Eintracht Braunschweig	Sandhausen
13:00 CET (UTC+1)	Bachmann 66'; Kinsombi 80'	Report	Ujah 52'; Donkor 74'	Stadium: BWT-Stadion am Hardtwald; Attendance: 4,729; Referee: Alexander Sather

6 November 2022 15	Eintracht Braunschweig	0–1	SpVgg Greuther Fürth	Braunschweig
13:00 CET (UTC+1)		Report	Sieb 41'	Stadium: Eintracht-Stadion; Attendance: 17,580; Referee: Sven Waschitzki-Günther

9 November 2022 16	Jahn Regensburg	1–1	Eintracht Braunschweig	Regensburg
18:30 CET (UTC+1)	Makridis 11'	Report	Lauberbach 15'	Stadium: Jahnstadion; Attendance: 8,232; Referee: Martin Petersen

12 November 2022 17	Eintracht Braunschweig	0–1	Hansa Rostock	Braunschweig
20:30 CET (UTC+1)		Report	Ingelsson 60'	Stadium: Eintracht-Stadion; Attendance: 21,221; Referee: Michael Bacher

29 January 2023 18	Hamburger SV	4–2	Eintracht Braunschweig	Hamburg
13:30 CET (UTC+1)	Glatzel 3', 49'; Heyer 17'; Reis 90+2'	Report	Kaufmann 30'; Wiebe 81'	Stadium: Volksparkstadion; Attendance: 56,507; Referee: Robert Hartmann

4 February 2023 19	Eintracht Braunschweig	2–0	1. FC Heidenheim	Braunschweig
13:00 CET (UTC+1)	Wintzheimer 72'; Lauberbach 90'	Report		Stadium: Eintracht-Stadion; Attendance: 16,776; Referee: Wolfgang Haslberger

12 February 2023 20	SV Darmstadt 98	2–1	Eintracht Braunschweig	Darmstadt
13:30 CET (UTC+1)	Honsak 82'; Tietz 90+1'	Report	Wintzheimer 52' (pen.)	Stadium: Merck-Stadion am Böllenfalltor; Attendance: 16,342; Referee: Robert Kampka

17 February 2023 21	Eintracht Braunschweig	2–3	Holstein Kiel	Braunschweig
18:30 CET (UTC+1)	Maulthaup 57'; Wiebe 69'	Report	Reese 14'; Friðjónsson 22'; Becker 48'	Stadium: Eintracht-Stadion; Attendance: 18,747; Referee: Nicolas Winter

24 February 2023 22	Fortuna Düsseldorf	3–1	Eintracht Braunschweig	Düsseldorf
18:30 CET (UTC+1)	Kownacki 1'; Klarer 25'; Niemiec 85'	Report	Kastenmeier 62' (o.g.)	Stadium: Merkur Spiel-Arena; Attendance: 24,127; Referee: Sven Waschitzki-Günther

5 March 2023 23	Eintracht Braunschweig	3–3	Arminia Bielefeld	Braunschweig
13:30 CET (UTC+1)	Pherai 22', 34'; Ujah 72'	Report	Consbruch 6'; Lasme 11'; Ramos 21'	Stadium: Eintracht-Stadion; Attendance: 19,758; Referee: Deniz Aytekin

10 March 2023 24	1. FC Nürnberg	2–0	Eintracht Braunschweig	Nürnberg
18:30 CET (UTC+1)	Hübner 69'; Gyamerah 81'	Report		Stadium: Max-Morlock-Stadion; Attendance: 25,238; Referee: Timo Gerach

19 March 2023 25	Eintracht Braunschweig	1–0	Hannover 96	Braunschweig
13:30 CET (UTC+1)	Nikolaou 90+1'	Report		Stadium: Eintracht-Stadion; Attendance: 20,995; Referee: Patrick Ittrich

1 April 2023 26	Karlsruher SC	1–1	Eintracht Braunschweig	Karlsruhe
13:00 CEST (UTC+2)		Report		Stadium: BBBank Wildpark; Attendance: 19,203; Referee: Florian Lechner

8 April 2023 27	Eintracht Braunschweig	1–0	1. FC Kaiserslautern	Braunschweig
13:00 CEST (UTC+2)	Ujah 76'	Report		Stadium: Eintracht-Stadion; Attendance: 21,143; Referee: Sascha Stegemann

16 April 2023 28	FC St. Pauli	1–2	Eintracht Braunschweig	Hamburg
13:30 CEST (UTC+2)	Medić 85'	Report	Multhaup 1'; Wintzheimer 25'	Stadium: Millerntor-Stadion; Attendance: 29,546; Referee: Robert Hartmann

22 April 2023 29	Eintracht Braunschweig	1–2	1. FC Magdeburg	Braunschweig
20:30 CEST (UTC+2)	Ujah 69'	Report	Kwarteng 22'; Ito 63'	Stadium: Eintracht-Stadion; Attendance: 23,325; Referee: Michael Bacher

28 April 2023 30	SC Paderborn 07	5–1	Eintracht Braunschweig	Paderborn
18:30 CEST (UTC+2)	Justvan 28'; Obermair 45+1'; Conteh 51'; Srbeny 90', 90+4'	Report	Ujah 53'	Stadium: Home Deluxe Arena; Attendance: 13,266; Referee: Benjamin Cortus

7 May 2023 31	Eintracht Braunschweig	2–1	SV Sandhausen	Braunschweig
13:30 CEST (UTC+2)	Decarli 82'; Donkor 89'	Report	Zhirov 88'	Stadium: Eintracht-Stadion; Attendance: 20,000; Referee: Daniel Siebert

13 May 2023 32	SpVgg Greuther Fürth	2–2	Eintracht Braunschweig	Fürth
13:00 CEST (UTC+2)	Green 23', 54'	Report	Ujah 10'; Pherai 47'	Stadium: Sportpark Ronhof Thomas Sommer; Attendance: 11,430; Referee: Robert Hartmann

20 May 2023 33	Eintracht Braunschweig	1–2	Jahn Regensburg	Braunschweig
13:00 CEST (UTC+2)	Pherai 2'	Report	Makridis 21'; Owusu 49'	Stadium: Eintracht-Stadion; Attendance: 20,267; Referee: Max Burda

28 May 2023 34	Hansa Rostock	2–1	Eintracht Braunschweig	Rostock
15:30 CEST (UTC+2)	Fröde 58'; Breier 90+3'	Report	Pherai 69' (pen.)	Stadium: Ostseestadion; Attendance: 26,500; Referee: Daniel Schlager

=== DFB-Pokal ===
31 July 2022 First round	Eintracht Braunschweig	4–4 (a.e.t.) (6–5 p)	Hertha BSC	Braunschweig
18:01 CEST (UTC+2)	Nikolaou (yellow card) 40'; Behrendt 63' (pen.); Lauberbach 66'; Henning (yellow card) 82', (goal) 118'; Pherai 91', (yellow card) 93'	Report	Selke 10'; Maolida 42'; Lukebakio (yellow card) 53', (goal) 106'; Tousart (yellow card) 69', (goal) 103'; Šunjić (yellow card) 108'	Stadium: Eintracht-Stadion; Attendance: 14,126; Referee: Tobias Stieler
	Penalties
	Pherai (penalty scored); Marx (penalty scored); Nikolaou (penalty scored); Donkor (penalty missed); Behrendt (penalty scored); Krauße (penalty scored); Henning (penalty scored)		(penalty scored) Darida; (penalty scored) Kenny; (penalty missed) Plattenhardt; (penalty scored) Jovetić; (penalty scored) Ejuke; (penalty scored) Šunjić; (penalty missed) Kempf

18 October 2022 Second round	Eintracht Braunschweig	1–2	VfL Wolfsburg	Braunschweig
20:45 CEST (UTC+2)	Multhaup 40'	Report	Svanberg 8'; Kamiński 65'	Stadium: Eintracht-Stadion; Attendance: 22,000; Referee: Daniel Schlager
