= 2022–23 DFB-Pokal =

Tournament details
- Country: Germany
- Venue(s): Olympiastadion, Berlin
- Dates: 29 July 2022 – 3 June 2023
- Teams: 64

Final positions
- Champions: RB Leipzig (2nd title)
- Runners-up: Eintracht Frankfurt
- Europa League: Bayer Leverkusen

Tournament statistics
- Matches played: 63
- Goals scored: 238 (3.78 per match)
- Attendance: 1,351,432 (21,451 per match)
- Top goal scorer(s): Randal Kolo Muani (6 goals)

The 2022–23 DFB-Pokal was the 80th season of the annual German football cup competition. Sixty-four teams participated in the competition, including all teams from the previous year's Bundesliga and 2. Bundesliga. The competition began on 29 July 2022 with the first of six rounds and ended on 3 June 2023 with the final at the Olympiastadion in Berlin, a nominally neutral venue, which has hosted the final since 1985. The DFB-Pokal is considered the second-most important club title in German football after the Bundesliga championship. The DFB-Pokal is run by the German Football Association (DFB).

The defending champions were Bundesliga side RB Leipzig, after they defeated SC Freiburg 4–2 on penalties in the previous season's final. Leipzig successfully defended their title, beating Eintracht Frankfurt 2–0 in the final.

The winner of the DFB-Pokal would normally have earned automatic qualification for the group stage of the 2023–24 edition of the UEFA Europa League. However, Leipzig had already qualified for the UEFA Champions League via their position in the Bundesliga, so their spot went to the team in sixth place, while the league's UEFA Europa Conference League play-off round spot went to the seventh-placed team. Leipzig also qualified for the 2023 edition of the DFL-Supercup at the start of the next season, where they faced the champions of the 2022–23 Bundesliga, Bayern Munich, for the second consecutive year.

== Participating clubs ==
The following teams qualified for the competition:

Bundesliga the 18 clubs of the 2021–22 season	2. Bundesliga; the 18 clubs of the 2021–22 season	3. Liga; the top 4 clubs of the 2021–22 season
FC Augsburg; Hertha BSC; Union Berlin; Arminia Bielefeld; VfL Bochum; Borussia Dortmund; Eintracht Frankfurt; SC Freiburg; Greuther Fürth; 1899 Hoffenheim; 1. FC Köln; RB Leipzig; Bayer Leverkusen; Mainz 05; Borussia Mönchengladbach; Bayern Munich; VfB Stuttgart; VfL Wolfsburg	Erzgebirge Aue; Werder Bremen; Darmstadt 98; Dynamo Dresden; Fortuna Düsseldorf; Hamburger SV; Hannover 96; 1. FC Heidenheim; FC Ingolstadt; Karlsruher SC; Holstein Kiel; 1. FC Nürnberg; SC Paderborn; Jahn Regensburg; Hansa Rostock; SV Sandhausen; Schalke 04; FC St. Pauli	1. FC Magdeburg; Eintracht Braunschweig; 1. FC Kaiserslautern; 1860 Munich
Representatives of the regional associations 24 representatives of 21 regional associations of the DFB, qualify (in general) through the 2021–22 Verbandspokal (Note: The three regions with the most participating teams in their league competitions (Bavaria, Lower Saxony, and Westphalia) were allowed to enter two teams for the competition.)
Baden: Waldhof Mannheim; Bavaria (Note: In addition to the Bavarian Cup winners, the best-placed amateur team of the Regionalliga Bayern also qualified.): FV Illertissen (CW); SpVgg Bayreuth (RB); Berlin: Viktoria Berlin; Brandenburg: Energie Cottbus; Bremen: Bremer SV; Hamburg: Teutonia Ottensen; Hesse: Kickers Offenbach	Lower Rhine: SV Straelen; Lower Saxony (Note: The Lower Saxony Cup was split into two paths: one for 3. Liga and Regionalliga Nord teams, and the other for amateur teams. The winners of each path qualified.): Schwarz-Weiß Rehden (3L/RL); Blau-Weiß Lohne (Am.); Mecklenburg-Vorpommern: TSG Neustrelitz; Middle Rhine: Viktoria Köln; Rhineland: FV Engers; Saarland: SV Elversberg; Saxony: Chemnitzer FC	Saxony-Anhalt: Einheit Wernigerode (Note: Einheit Wernigerode qualified regardless of the outcome of the final of the Saxony-Anhalt Cup, as 1. FC Magdeburg, the other finalists, already qualified for the DFB-Pokal through their 3. Liga position.); Schleswig-Holstein: VfB Lübeck; South Baden: SV Oberachern; Southwest: Schott Mainz; Thuringia: Carl Zeiss Jena; Westphalia (Note: In addition to the Westphalian Cup winners, the best-placed amateur team of the Oberliga Westfalen also qualified.): SV Rödinghausen (CW); 1. FC Kaan-Marienborn (OW); Württemberg: Stuttgarter Kickers

== Format ==
=== Participation ===
The DFB-Pokal began with a round of 64 teams. The 36 teams of the Bundesliga and 2. Bundesliga, along with the top 4 finishers of the 3. Liga automatically qualified for the tournament. Of the remaining slots, 21 were given to the cup winners of the regional football associations, the Verbandspokal. The three remaining slots were given to the three regional associations with the most men's teams, which were Bavaria, Lower Saxony, and Westphalia. The best-placed amateur team of the Regionalliga Bayern was given the spot for Bavaria. For Lower Saxony, the Lower Saxony Cup was split into two paths: one for 3. Liga and Regionalliga Nord teams, and the other for amateur teams. The winners of each path qualified. For Westphalia, the best-placed team of the Oberliga Westfalen also qualified. As every team was entitled to participate in local tournaments which qualified for the association cups, every team could in principle compete in the DFB-Pokal. Reserve teams and combined football sections were not permitted to enter, along with no two teams of the same association or corporation.

=== Draw ===
The draws for the different rounds were conducted as follows:

For the first round, the participating teams were split into two pots of 32 teams each. The first pot contained all teams which qualified through their regional cup competitions, the best four teams of the 3. Liga, and the bottom four teams of the 2. Bundesliga. Every team from this pot was drawn to a team from the second pot, which contained all remaining professional teams (all the teams of the Bundesliga and the remaining fourteen 2. Bundesliga teams). The teams from the first pot were set as the home team in the process.

The two-pot scenario was also applied for the second round, with the remaining 3. Liga and/or amateur team(s) in the first pot and the remaining Bundesliga and 2. Bundesliga teams in the other pot. Once again, the 3. Liga and/or amateur team(s) served as hosts. This time the pots did not have to be of equal size though, depending on the results of the first round. Theoretically, it was even possible that there could be only one pot, if all of the teams from one of the pots from the first round had beat all the others in the second pot. Once one pot is empty, the remaining pairings were drawn from the other pot, with the first-drawn team for a match serving as hosts.

For the remaining rounds, the draw was conducted from just one pot. Any remaining 3. Liga and/or amateur team(s) were the home team if drawn against a professional team. In every other case, the first-drawn team served as hosts.

=== Match rules ===
Teams met in one game per round. Matches took place for 90 minutes, with two halves of 45 minutes each. If still tied after regulation, 30 minutes of extra time were played, consisting of two periods of 15 minutes. If the score was still level after this, the match was decided by a penalty shoot-out. A coin toss would decide who took the first penalty. A maximum of nine players could be listed on the substitute bench, while a maximum of five substitutions were allowed. However, each team was only given three opportunities to make substitutions, with a fourth opportunity in extra time, excluding substitutions made at half-time, before the start of extra time and at half-time in extra time. From the round of 16 onward, a video assistant referee was appointed for all DFB-Pokal matches. Though technically possible, VAR was not used for home matches of Bundesliga clubs prior to the round of 16 in order to provide a uniform approach to all matches.

=== Suspensions ===
If a player received five yellow cards in the competition, he was then suspended from the next cup match. Similarly, receiving a second yellow card suspended a player from the next cup match. If a player received a direct red card, they were suspended a minimum of one match, but the German Football Association reserved the right to increase the suspension.

=== Champion qualification ===
The winners of the DFB-Pokal earned automatic qualification for the group stage of next year's edition of the UEFA Europa League. If they were already qualified for the UEFA Champions League through position in the Bundesliga, then the spot would go to the team in sixth place, and the league's UEFA Europa Conference League play-off round spot would go to the team in seventh place. The winners also qualified for the DFL-Supercup at the start of the next season, and would face the champion of the previous year's Bundesliga, unless the same team won the Bundesliga and the DFB-Pokal, completing a double. In that case, the runner-up of the Bundesliga would take the spot instead.

== Schedule ==
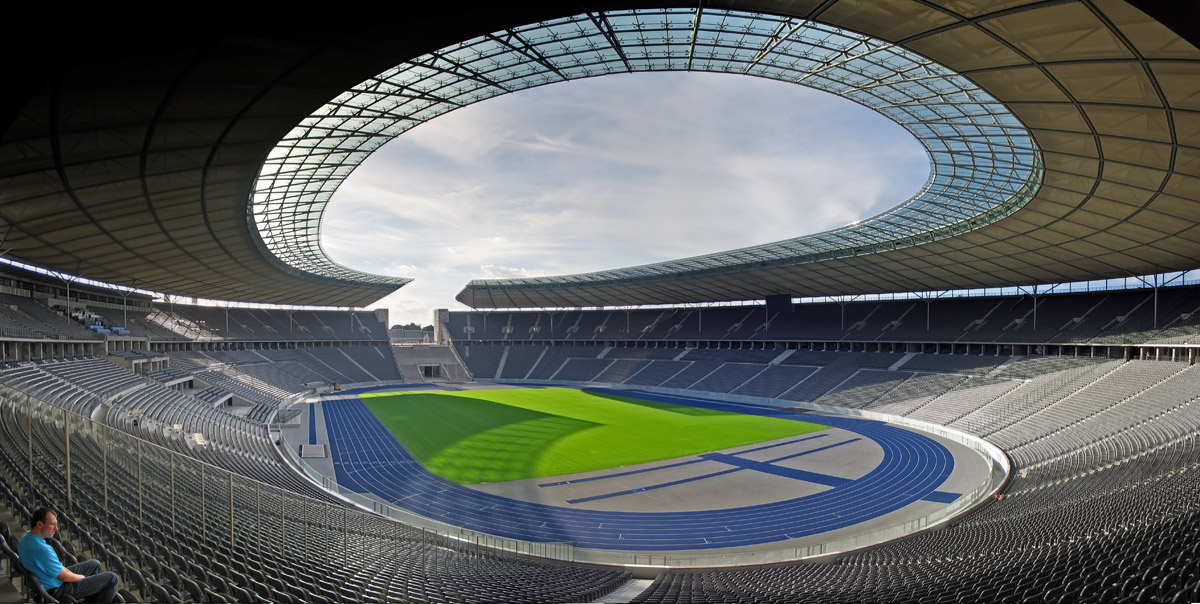
The Olympiastadion in Berlin hosted the final.

All draws were held at the German Football Museum in Dortmund, on a Sunday evening after each round (unless noted otherwise). The draws were televised on ARD's Sportschau, broadcast on Das Erste.

From the 2022–23 season, the schedule of the DFB-Pokal was reformed, with fewer matches played simultaneously to increase attractiveness for television broadcasts. This included the first round, in which two matches were played on a Tuesday and Wednesday a month after the other matches in the round, and the round of 16, which was split across two weeks.

The rounds of the 2022–23 competition were scheduled as follows:

Round	Draw date	Matches
First round	29 May 2022	29 July – 1 August & 30–31 August 2022
Second round	4 September 2022	18–19 October 2022
Round of 16	23 October 2022	31 January – 1 February & 7–8 February 2023
Quarter-finals	19 February 2023	4–5 April 2023
Semi-finals	9 April 2023	2–3 May 2023
Final	9 April 2023	3 June 2023 at Olympiastadion, Berlin

== Matches ==
A total of sixty-three matches took place, starting with the first round on 29 July 2022 and culminating with the final on 3 June 2023 at the Olympiastadion in Berlin.

Times up to 29 October 2022 and from 26 March 2023 are CEST (UTC+2). Times from 30 October 2022 to 25 March 2023 are CET (UTC+1).

=== First round ===
The draw for the first round was held on 29 May 2022, with Kevin Großkreutz drawing the matches. Thirty of the thirty-two matches took place from 29 July to 1 August 2022. The remaining two matches, involving the participants of the 2022 DFL-Supercup (played on 30 July), took place on 30 and 31 August 2022.

29 July 2022	TSG Neustrelitz	0–8	Karlsruher SC	Neustrelitz
18:01		Report	Schleusener 12', 14', 41'; Gondorf 67'; Batmaz 72'; Gordon 73'; Rapp 82', 87'	Stadium: Parkstadion; Attendance: 5,000; Referee: Konrad Oldhafer

29 July 2022	1. FC Kaan-Marienborn	0–2	1. FC Nürnberg	Siegen (Note: The 1. FC Kaan-Marienborn v 1. FC Nürnberg match took place at the Leimbachstadion instead of 1. FC Kaan-Marienborn's home stadium, the Herkules-Arena im Breitenbachtal.)
18:01		Report	Geis 45'; Valentini 84'	Stadium: Leimbachstadion; Attendance: 8,000; Referee: Robert Kampka

29 July 2022	Dynamo Dresden	0–1	VfB Stuttgart	Dresden
18:01		Report	Churlinov 33'	Stadium: Rudolf-Harbig-Stadion; Attendance: 22,644; Referee: Florian Badstübner

29 July 2022	1860 Munich	0–3	Borussia Dortmund	Munich
20:46		Report	Malen 8'; Bellingham 31'; Adeyemi 35'	Stadium: Grünwalder Stadion; Attendance: 15,000; Referee: Benjamin Brand

30 July 2022	Viktoria Berlin	0–3	VfL Bochum	Berlin
13:01		Report	Zoller 18'; Asano 22'; Hofmann 65'	Stadium: Friedrich-Ludwig-Jahn-Sportpark; Attendance: 5,573; Referee: Patrick Alt

30 July 2022	SV Straelen	3–4	FC St. Pauli	Duisburg (Note: The SV Straelen v FC St. Pauli match took place at the MSV-Arena instead of SV Straelen's home stadium, the Sportplatz Römerstraße in Straelen.)
13:01	Vicario 19', 80'; Nshimirimana 42'	Report	Smith 26'; Medić 40', 90'; Otto 62'	Stadium: MSV-Arena; Attendance: 5,874; Referee: Tom Bauer

30 July 2022	SV Elversberg	4–3	Bayer Leverkusen	Spiesen-Elversberg
15:31	Rochelt 2'; Koffi 17' (pen.); Schnellbacher 37'; Conrad 74'	Report	Hložek 5'; Aránguiz 30'; Schick 89'	Stadium: Waldstadion an der Kaiserlinde; Attendance: 7,500; Referee: Martin Petersen

30 July 2022	Jahn Regensburg	2–2 (a.e.t.) (4–3 p)	1. FC Köln	Regensburg
15:31	Albers 18'; Owusu 27'	Report	Uth 28'; Ljubičić 63'	Stadium: Jahnstadion Regensburg; Attendance: 13,236; Referee: Felix Brych
	Penalties
	Makridis (penalty scored); Thalhammer (penalty scored); Saller (penalty missed); Yıldırım (penalty scored); Gimber (penalty scored)		(penalty scored) Ljubičić; (penalty missed) Chabot; (penalty scored) Maina; (penalty scored) Thielmann; (penalty missed) Ehizibue

30 July 2022	FV Illertissen	0–2	1. FC Heidenheim	Illertissen
15:31		Report	Mainka 57'; Beck 80'	Stadium: Vöhlinstadion; Attendance: 3,500; Referee: Marco Fritz

30 July 2022	VfB Lübeck	1–0	Hansa Rostock	Lübeck
15:31	Gözüsirin 78'	Report		Stadium: Stadion Lohmühle; Attendance: 10,351; Referee: Arne Aarnink

30 July 2022	SpVgg Bayreuth	1–3 (a.e.t.)	Hamburger SV	Bayreuth
15:31	Hemmerich 16'	Report	Königsdörffer 83', 111'; Schonlau 97'	Stadium: Hans-Walter-Wild-Stadion; Attendance: 14,700; Referee: Michael Bacher

30 July 2022	Einheit Wernigerode	0–10	SC Paderborn	Wernigerode (Note: The Einheit Wernigerode v SC Paderborn match took place at the Sportforum Wernigerode instead of Einheit Wernigerode's home stadium, the Mannsberg-Stadion.)
15:31		Report	Justvan 7', 46'; Leipertz 10', 58'; Pieringer 40', 50', 53', 90'; Srbeny 49'; Tachie 67'	Stadium: Sportforum Wernigerode; Attendance: 3,000; Referee: Richard Hempel

30 July 2022	Stuttgarter Kickers	2–0	Greuther Fürth	Stuttgart
18:01	Zagaria 9'; Braig 89'	Report		Stadium: Gazi-Stadion auf der Waldau; Attendance: 7,500; Referee: Timo Gerach

30 July 2022	Kickers Offenbach	1–4	Fortuna Düsseldorf	Offenbach
18:01	Lemmer 57'	Report	Hoffmann 33'; Lemmer 54' (o.g.); Ginczek 71', 79'	Stadium: Bieberer Berg; Attendance: 16,620; Referee: Benjamin Cortus

30 July 2022	Carl Zeiss Jena	0–1	VfL Wolfsburg	Jena
18:01		Report	Marmoush 90+2'	Stadium: Ernst-Abbe-Sportfeld; Attendance: 6,100; Referee: Florian Heft

31 July 2022	Schwarz-Weiß Rehden	0–4	SV Sandhausen	Rehden
13:01		Report	Bachmann 23', 45'; Kutucu 32'; Zhirov 51'	Stadium: Sportplatz Waldsportstätten; Attendance: 1,500; Referee: Florian Lechner

31 July 2022	Bremer SV	0–5	Schalke 04	Oldenburg (Note: The Bremer SV v Schalke 04 match took place at the Marschweg-Stadion instead of Bremer SV's home stadium, the Stadion am Panzenberg in Bremen.)
13:01		Report	Zalazar 3'; Drexler 12', 33'; Kmiec 39' (o.g.); Kamiński 83'	Stadium: Marschweg-Stadion; Attendance: 10,000; Referee: Patrick Hanslbauer

31 July 2022	1. FC Kaiserslautern	1–2 (a.e.t.)	SC Freiburg	Kaiserslautern
15:31	Ritter 33'	Report	Sallai 82'; Dōan 111'	Stadium: Fritz-Walter-Stadion; Attendance: 38,317; Referee: Jörg Jablonksi

31 July 2022	SV Oberachern	1–9	Borussia Mönchengladbach	Freiburg im Breisgau (Note: The SV Oberachern v Borussia Mönchengladbach match took place at the Dreisamstadion instead of SV Oberachern's home stadium, the Waldsportplatz in Achern.)
15:31	Huber 61'	Report	Thuram 2', 22', 36'; Hofmann 37', 45+3'; Bensebaini 45'; Stindl 47'; Scally 59'; Neuhaus 78'	Stadium: Dreisamstadion; Attendance: 13,558; Referee: Nicolas Winter

31 July 2022	Blau-Weiß Lohne	0–4	FC Augsburg	Lohne
15:31		Report	Maier 51'; Jensen 69'; Niederlechner 81'; Malone 89'	Stadium: Heinz-Dettmer-Stadion; Attendance: 5,000; Referee: Sven Waschitzki-Günther

31 July 2022	Schott Mainz	0–3	Hannover 96	Mainz (Note: The Schott Mainz v Hannover 96 match took place at the Bruchwegstadion instead of Schott Mainz's home stadium, the Otto-Schott-Sportzentrum.)
15:31		Report	Ahlbach 36' (o.g.); Beier 42'; Haas 50' (o.g.)	Stadium: Bruchwegstadion; Attendance: 3,000; Referee: Florian Exner

31 July 2022	FV Engers	1–7	Arminia Bielefeld	Koblenz (Note: The FV Engers v Arminia Bielefeld match took place at the Stadion Oberwerth in Koblenz instead of FV Engers's home stadium, the Stadion am Wasserturm in Neuwied.)
15:31	Kap 54'	Report	Serra 9', 70'; Klos 24', 50'; Okugawa 56'; Lasme 86'; Hack 90+1'	Stadium: Stadion Oberwerth; Attendance: 3,558; Referee: Wolfgang Haslberger

31 July 2022	SV Rödinghausen	0–2 (a.e.t.)	1899 Hoffenheim	Rödinghausen
15:31		Report	Kabak 115'; Prömel 118'	Stadium: Häcker Wiehenstadion; Attendance: 10,000; Referee: Robin Braun

31 July 2022	Eintracht Braunschweig	4–4 (a.e.t.) (6–5 p)	Hertha BSC	Braunschweig
18:01	Behrendt 63' (pen.); Lauberbach 66'; Pherai 91'; Henning 118'	Report	Selke 10'; Maolida 42'; Tousart 103'; Lukebakio 106'	Stadium: Eintracht-Stadion; Attendance: 14,126; Referee: Tobias Stieler
	Penalties
	Pherai (penalty scored); Marx (penalty scored); Nikolaou (penalty scored); Donkor (penalty missed); Behrendt (penalty scored); Krauße (penalty scored); Henning (penalty scored)		(penalty scored) Darida; (penalty scored) Kenny; (penalty missed) Plattenhardt; (penalty scored) Jovetić; (penalty scored) Ejuke; (penalty scored) Šunjić; (penalty missed) Kempf

31 July 2022	Erzgebirge Aue	0–3	Mainz 05	Aue-Bad Schlema
18:01		Report	Kohr 41'; Burgzorg 70'; Ingvartsen 78' (pen.)	Stadium: Erzgebirgsstadion; Attendance: 15,500; Referee: Deniz Aytekin

31 July 2022	Waldhof Mannheim	0–0 (a.e.t.) (5–3 p)	Holstein Kiel	Mannheim
18:01		Report		Stadium: Carl-Benz-Stadion; Attendance: 13,137; Referee: Tobias Reichel
	Penalties
	Bahn (penalty scored); Rossipal (penalty scored); Russo (penalty scored); Sohm (penalty scored); Wagner (penalty scored)		(penalty scored) Erras; (penalty scored) Komenda; (penalty missed) Schulz; (penalty scored) Okyere Wriedt

1 August 2022	Chemnitzer FC	1–2 (a.e.t.)	Union Berlin	Chemnitz
18:01	Müller 62'	Report	Pefok 64'; Behrens 114'	Stadium: Stadion an der Gellertstraße; Attendance: 13,465; Referee: Bastian Dankert

1 August 2022	Energie Cottbus	1–2	Werder Bremen	Cottbus
18:01	Heike 79'	Report	Schmid 43'; Weiser 73'	Stadium: Stadion der Freundschaft; Attendance: 20,078; Referee: Daniel Siebert

1 August 2022	FC Ingolstadt	0–3	Darmstadt 98	Ingolstadt
18:01		Report	Tietz 15'; Kempe 42' (pen.); Warming 84'	Stadium: Audi Sportpark; Attendance: 5,298; Referee: Robert Hartmann

1 August 2022	1. FC Magdeburg	0–4	Eintracht Frankfurt	Magdeburg
20:46		Report	Kamada 4', 59'; Lindstrøm 31'; Alario 90'	Stadium: MDCC-Arena; Attendance: 26,350; Referee: Felix Zwayer

30 August 2022	Teutonia Ottensen	0–8	RB Leipzig	Leipzig (Note: The Teutonia Ottensen v RB Leipzig match was originally scheduled to take place at the Paul Greifzu Stadium in Dessau-Roßlau instead of Teutonia Ottensen's home stadium, the Stadion Hoheluft in Hamburg. However, the turf at the Paul Greifzu Stadium was poisoned a week before the match, leading to the teams exchanging the home rights to the match.)
20:46		Report	Werner 19', 20', 43'; Silva 40', 53'; Forsberg 56'; Nkunku 77'; Olmo 80'	Stadium: Red Bull Arena; Attendance: 13,084; Referee: Harm Osmers

31 August 2022	Viktoria Köln	0–5	Bayern Munich	Cologne (Note: The Viktoria Köln v Bayern Munich match took place at the RheinEnergieStadion instead of Viktoria Köln's home stadium, the Sportpark Höhenberg.)
20:46		Report	Gravenberch 35'; Tel 45+1'; Mané 53'; Musiala 67'; Goretzka 82'	Stadium: RheinEnergieStadion; Attendance: 50,000; Referee: Matthias Jöllenbeck

=== Second round ===
The draw for the second round was held on 4 September 2022, with Josia Topf drawing the matches. The sixteen matches took place from 18 to 19 October 2022.

18 October 2022	VfB Lübeck	0–3	Mainz 05	Lübeck
18:00		Report	Hack 16'; Ingvartsen 43'; Barkok 88'	Stadium: Stadion Lohmühle; Attendance: 9,974; Referee: Robin Braun

18 October 2022	Stuttgarter Kickers	0–2	Eintracht Frankfurt	Stuttgart
18:00		Report	Kolo Muani 11'; Smolčić 17'	Stadium: Gazi-Stadion auf der Waldau; Attendance: 10,000; Referee: Deniz Aytekin

18 October 2022	Waldhof Mannheim	0–1	1. FC Nürnberg	Mannheim
18:00		Report	Gohlke 63' (o.g.)	Stadium: Carl-Benz-Stadion; Attendance: 15,000; Referee: Christian Dingert

18 October 2022	RB Leipzig	4–0	Hamburger SV	Leipzig
18:00	Poulsen 33', 36'; Simakan 69'; Henrichs 81'	Report		Stadium: Red Bull Arena; Attendance: 44,787; Referee: Benjamin Cortus

18 October 2022	SV Elversberg	0–1	VfL Bochum	Spiesen-Elversberg
20:45		Report	Losilla 85'	Stadium: Waldstadion an der Kaiserlinde; Attendance: 6,911; Referee: Sven Waschitzki-Günther

18 October 2022	Eintracht Braunschweig	1–2	VfL Wolfsburg	Braunschweig
20:45	Multhaup 40'	Report	Svanberg 8'; Kamiński 65'	Stadium: Eintracht-Stadion; Attendance: 22,000; Referee: Daniel Schlager

18 October 2022	1899 Hoffenheim	5–1	Schalke 04	Sinsheim
20:45	Dabbur 5', 43'; Angeliño 16'; Kabak 51'; Kadeřábek 63'	Report	Drexler 69'	Stadium: PreZero Arena; Attendance: 15,633; Referee: Matthias Jöllenbeck

18 October 2022	Darmstadt 98	2–1	Borussia Mönchengladbach	Darmstadt
20:45	Tietz 23'; Seydel 79'	Report	Netz 48'	Stadium: Merck-Stadion am Böllenfalltor; Attendance: 15,850; Referee: Robert Schröder

19 October 2022	Hannover 96	0–2	Borussia Dortmund	Hanover
18:00		Report	Arrey-Mbi 11' (o.g.); Bellingham 71' (pen.)	Stadium: Heinz von Heiden-Arena; Attendance: 49,000; Referee: Sven Jablonski

19 October 2022	SC Freiburg	2–1 (a.e.t.)	FC St. Pauli	Freiburg
18:00	Ginter 90+3'; Gregoritsch 119'	Report	Daschner 42'	Stadium: Europa-Park Stadion; Attendance: 33,000; Referee: Felix Brych

19 October 2022	SV Sandhausen	2–2 (a.e.t.) (8–7 p)	Karlsruher SC	Sandhausen
18:00	Ambrosius 8' (o.g.); Schirow 44'	Report	Wanitzek 58' (pen.); Breithaupt 72'	Stadium: BWT-Stadion am Hardtwald; Attendance: 8,644; Referee: Martin Petersen
	Penalties
	Ochs (penalty scored); Soukou (penalty scored); Papela (penalty scored); Bachmann (penalty scored); Ritzmaier (penalty scored); Đumić (penalty scored); Höhn (penalty scored); Kutucu (penalty scored)		(penalty scored) Wanitzek; (penalty scored) Gondorf; (penalty scored) Heise; (penalty scored) Breithaupt; (penalty scored) Rapp; (penalty scored) Kaufmann; (penalty scored) Choi; (penalty missed) Franke

19 October 2022	SC Paderborn	2–2 (a.e.t.) (5–4 p)	Werder Bremen	Paderborn
18:00	Platte 22'; Conteh 42'	Report	Bittencourt 65'; Weiser 84'	Stadium: Home Deluxe Arena; Attendance: 15,000; Referee: Frank Willenborg
	Penalties
	Leipertz (penalty scored); Justvan (penalty scored); Muslija (penalty scored); Srbeny (penalty scored); Tachie (penalty scored)		(penalty scored) Füllkrug; (penalty scored) Veljković; (penalty scored) Schmidt; (penalty scored) Gruev; (penalty missed) Bittencourt

19 October 2022	FC Augsburg	2–5	Bayern Munich	Augsburg
20:45	Valentin 9'; Upamecano 65' (o.g.)	Report	Choupo-Moting 27', 59'; Kimmich 53'; Musiala 74'; Davies 90+1'	Stadium: WWK Arena; Attendance: 30,660; Referee: Bastian Dankert

19 October 2022	VfB Stuttgart	6–0	Arminia Bielefeld	Stuttgart
20:45	Stenzel 20'; Endo 24'; Pfeiffer 29', 52'; Silas 39'; Guirassy 67'	Report		Stadium: Mercedes-Benz Arena; Attendance: 50,000; Referee: Robert Hartmann

19 October 2022	Union Berlin	2–0	1. FC Heidenheim	Berlin
20:45	Puchacz 7'; Michel 52'	Report		Stadium: Stadion An der Alten Försterei; Attendance: 20,500; Referee: Florian Badstübner

19 October 2022	Jahn Regensburg	0–3	Fortuna Düsseldorf	Regensburg
20:45		Report	Peterson 5'; Kownacki 16'; Iyoha 45+1'	Stadium: Jahnstadion Regensburg; Attendance: 7,892; Referee: Timo Gerach

=== Round of 16 ===
The draw for the round of 16 was held on 23 October 2022, with Maria Asnaimer drawing the matches. The eight matches took place from 31 January to 1 February and 7 to 8 February 2023.

31 January 2023	SC Paderborn	1–2	VfB Stuttgart	Paderborn
18:00	Mavropanos 4' (o.g.)	Report	Dias 86'; Guirassy 90+5'	Stadium: Home Deluxe Arena; Attendance: 14,000; Referee: Daniel Schlager

31 January 2023	Union Berlin	2–1	VfL Wolfsburg	Berlin
20:45	Knoche 12'; Behrens 79'	Report	Waldschmidt 5'	Stadium: Stadion An der Alten Försterei; Attendance: 22,012; Referee: Sascha Stegemann

1 February 2023	RB Leipzig	3–1	1899 Hoffenheim	Leipzig
18:00	Forsberg 8'; Laimer 41'; Werner 83'	Report	Dolberg 76'	Stadium: Red Bull Arena; Attendance: 34,822; Referee: Christian Dingert

1 February 2023	Mainz 05	0–4	Bayern Munich	Mainz
20:45		Report	Choupo-Moting 17'; Musiala 30'; Sané 44'; Davies 83'	Stadium: Mewa Arena; Attendance: 33,305; Referee: Deniz Aytekin

7 February 2023	SV Sandhausen	0–2	SC Freiburg	Sandhausen
18:00		Report	Lienhart 87'; Petersen 90+5'	Stadium: BWT-Stadion am Hardtwald; Attendance: 11,782; Referee: Marco Fritz

7 February 2023	Eintracht Frankfurt	4–2	Darmstadt 98	Frankfurt
20:45	Kolo Muani 6', 90'; Borré 44'; Kamada 62'	Report	Honsak 29', 31'	Stadium: Deutsche Bank Park; Attendance: 49,500; Referee: Felix Zwayer

8 February 2023	1. FC Nürnberg	1–1 (a.e.t.) (5–3 p)	Fortuna Düsseldorf	Nuremberg
18:00	Duman 90+3'	Report	Kownacki 33'	Stadium: Max-Morlock-Stadion; Attendance: 26,000; Referee: Matthias Jöllenbeck
	Penalties
	Geis (penalty scored); Duman (penalty scored); Gyamerah (penalty scored); Schindler (penalty scored); Shuranov (penalty scored)		(penalty scored) Kastenmeier; (penalty scored) Klarer; (penalty scored) Hendrix; (penalty missed) Niemiec

8 February 2023	VfL Bochum	1–2	Borussia Dortmund	Bochum
20:45	Stöger 64' (pen.)	Report	Can 45'; Reus 70'	Stadium: Vonovia Ruhrstadion; Attendance: 26,000; Referee: Tobias Stieler

=== Quarter-finals ===
The draw for the quarter-finals was held on 19 February 2023, with Jacqueline Meißner drawing the matches. The four matches took place from 4 to 5 April 2023.

4 April 2023	Eintracht Frankfurt	2–0	Union Berlin	Frankfurt
18:00	Kolo Muani 11', 12'	Report		Stadium: Deutsche Bank Park; Attendance: 50,000; Referee: Bastian Dankert

4 April 2023	Bayern Munich	1–2	SC Freiburg	Munich
20:45	Upamecano 19'	Report	Höfler 27'; Höler 90+5' (pen.)	Stadium: Allianz Arena; Attendance: 75,000; Referee: Harm Osmers

5 April 2023	1. FC Nürnberg	0–1	VfB Stuttgart	Nuremberg
18:00		Report	Millot 83'	Stadium: Max-Morlock-Stadion; Attendance: 50,000; Referee: Daniel Siebert

5 April 2023	RB Leipzig	2–0	Borussia Dortmund	Leipzig
20:45	Werner 22'; Orbán 90+8'	Report		Stadium: Red Bull Arena; Attendance: 47,069; Referee: Felix Brych

=== Semi-finals ===
The draw for the semi-finals was held on 9 April 2023, with Alfreð Gíslason drawing the matches. The two matches took place from 2 to 3 May 2023.

2 May 2023	SC Freiburg	1–5	RB Leipzig	Freiburg
20:45	Gregoritsch 75'	Report	Olmo 13'; Henrichs 14'; Szoboszlai 37', 90+7' (pen.); Nkunku 45+1'	Stadium: Europa-Park Stadion; Attendance: 34,700; Referee: Sven Jablonski

3 May 2023	VfB Stuttgart	2–3	Eintracht Frankfurt	Stuttgart
20:45	Tomás 19'; Millot 83'	Report	Ndicka 51'; Kamada 55'; Kolo Muani 77' (pen.)	Stadium: Mercedes-Benz Arena; Attendance: 47,500; Referee: Daniel Schlager

=== Final ===
The final took place on 3 June 2023 at the Olympiastadion in Berlin.

3 June 2023
20:00 CEST

RB Leipzig	2–0	Eintracht Frankfurt
Nkunku 71'; Szoboszlai 85'	Report

Olympiastadion, Berlin
Attendance: 74,322
Referee: Daniel Siebert (Berlin)

== Top goalscorers ==
The following were the top scorers of the DFB-Pokal, sorted first by number of goals, and then alphabetically if necessary. Goals scored in penalty shoot-outs are not included.

Rank	Player	Team	Goals
1	(France) Randal Kolo Muani	Eintracht Frankfurt	6
2	(Germany) Timo Werner	RB Leipzig	5
3	(Japan) Daichi Kamada	Eintracht Frankfurt	4
3	(Germany) Marvin Pieringer	SC Paderborn	4
5	(Cameroon) Eric-Maxim Choupo-Moting	Bayern Munich	3
5	(Germany) Dominick Drexler	Schalke 04	3
5	(Germany) Jamal Musiala	Bayern Munich	3
5	(France) Christopher Nkunku	RB Leipzig	3
5	(Germany) Fabian Schleusener	Karlsruher SC	3
5	(Hungary) Dominik Szoboszlai	RB Leipzig	3
5	(France) Marcus Thuram	Borussia Mönchengladbach	3
