= 2023–24 Eintracht Braunschweig season =

Eintracht Braunschweig
2023–24 season
- Head coach: Daniel Scherning
- Stadium: Eintracht-Stadion
- 2. Bundesliga: 15th
- DFB-Pokal: First round
- Top goalscorer: League: Rayan Philippe (8); All: Rayan Philippe (8)
- Highest home attendance: 21,290 vs Schalke 04
- Lowest home attendance: 19,003 vs SC Paderborn 07
- Biggest win: Eintracht Braunschweig 3–2 VfL Osnabrück
- Biggest defeat: Hertha BSC 3–0 Eintracht Braunschweig; SV Elversberg 3–0 Eintracht Braunschweig

The 2023–24 season was Eintracht Braunschweig's 129th season in existence and fourth consecutive in the 2. Bundesliga. They also competed in the DFB-Pokal.

== Players ==
=== First-team squad ===
As of 1 February 2024

Note: Flags indicate national team as defined under FIFA eligibility rules; some limited exceptions apply. Players may hold more than one non-FIFA nationality.

No.	Pos.	Nation	Player
1	GK	GER	Ron-Thorben Hoffmann
3	DF	SUI	Saulo Decarli
4	MF	GER	Jannis Nikolaou (captain)
5	DF	FIN	Robert Ivanov
6	DF	BIH	Ermin Bičakčić
7	MF	GER	Maurice Multhaup
8	MF	GER	Niklas Tauer
9	FW	FRA	Rayan Philippe
10	FW	GER	Florian Krüger (on loan from Groningen)
11	FW	GER	Luc Ihorst
12	MF	SWE	Hampus Finndell
13	GK	AUT	Tino Casali
14	FW	NGR	Anthony Ujah
17	FW	IRQ	Youssef Amyn
18	DF	GER	Marvin Rittmüller

No.	Pos.	Nation	Player
19	DF	GER	Anton Donkor
20	MF	ISL	Þórir Jóhann Helgason (on loan from Lecce)
21	GK	GER	Yannik Bangsow
22	MF	TUN	Rami Zouaoui
23	MF	GER	Danilo Wiebe
24	FW	GER	Sidi Sané
25	MF	GER	Emil Kischka
26	DF	GER	Jan-Hendrik Marx
27	DF	GER	Niko Kijewski
29	DF	TUR	Hasan Kuruçay
33	DF	GER	Sebastian Griesbeck
34	GK	GER	Justin Duda
37	MF	GER	Fabio Kaufmann
39	MF	GER	Robin Krauße
44	MF	USA	Johan Gomez

== Transfers ==
=== In ===
Pos.	Player	Transferred from	Fee	Date	Source

=== Out ===
Pos.	Player	Transferred from	Fee	Date	Source

== Pre-season and friendlies ==
Win Draw Loss

11 July 2023 Friendly	Preußen Münster (Germany)	3–1	(Germany) Eintracht Braunschweig

15 July 2023 Friendly	Eintracht Braunschweig (Germany)	3–1	(Spain) Real Betis	Braunschweig, Germany
12:30 CEST (UTC+2)	Endo 20'; Donkor 34'; Gomez 35'; Griesbeck (yellow card) 38'		Luiz Felipe (yellow card) 45+1'; Sierra (yellow card) 57'; Willian José 68' (pen.); Fernández (yellow card) 75'	Stadium: Eintracht-Stadion

19 July 2023 Friendly	Eintracht Braunschweig (Germany)	0–0	(Israel) Hapoel Tel Aviv

22 July 2023 Friendly	Eintracht Braunschweig (Germany)	1–0	(Germany) Rot-Weiss Essen

12 October 2023 Friendly	1. FC Magdeburg (Germany)	4–2	(Germany) Eintracht Braunschweig

17 November 2023 Friendly	Eintracht Braunschweig (Germany)	2–1	(Germany) FC St. Pauli

7 January 2024 Friendly	Eintracht Braunschweig (Germany)	3–1	(Germany) Werder Bremen	Braunschweig
15:00 CET (UTC+1)	Kaufmann 10'; Philippe 41'; Helgason 47'		Woltemade 83'	Stadium: Eintracht-Stadion

13 January 2024 Friendly	Eintracht Braunschweig (Germany)	1–0	(Germany) Jahn Regensburg

== Competitions ==
=== Overall record ===
Competition	First match	Last match	Starting round	Final position	Record							
Competition	First match	Last match	Starting round	Final position	Pld	W	D	L	GF	GA	GD	Win %
2. Bundesliga	28 July 2023	19 May 2024	Matchday 1	15th	34	11	5	18	37	53	−16	32.35
DFB-Pokal	11 August 2023		First round	First round	1	0	0	1	1	3	−2	0.00
Total					35	11	5	19	38	56	−18	31.43

Source: Soccerway

=== 2. Bundesliga ===
==== League table ====
Pos	Team	Pld	W	D	L	GF	GA	GD	Pts	Qualification or relegation
13	1. FC Kaiserslautern	34	11	6	17	59	64	−5	39	
14	1. FC Magdeburg	34	9	11	14	46	54	−8	38	
15	Eintracht Braunschweig	34	11	5	18	37	53	−16	38	
16	Wehen Wiesbaden (R)	34	8	8	18	36	50	−14	32	Qualification for relegation play-offs
17	Hansa Rostock (R)	34	9	4	21	30	57	−27	31	Relegation to 3. Liga

Source: DFB
Rules for classification: 1) Points; 2) Goal difference; 3) Goals scored; 4) Head-to-head results; 5) Head-to-head away goals scored; 6) Away goals scored; 7) Play-off.
(Rules 4–6 only apply after home and away matches have been played between the tied teams.)
(R) Relegated

==== Results summary ====
Overall								Home						Away					
Pld	W	D	L	GF	GA	GD	Pts	W	D	L	GF	GA	GD	W	D	L	GF	GA	GD
34	11	5	18	37	53	−16	38	7	4	6	21	21	0	4	1	12	16	32	−16

Source: DFB

==== Results by round ====
Round	1	2	3	4	5	6	7	8	9	10	11	12	13	14	15	16	17	18	19
Ground	H	A	H	A	H	A	H	A	H	A	H	A	H	A	H	A	H	A	H
Result	L	L	W	L	D	L	D	L	L	L	L	L	W	L	L	W	W	W	W
Position	14	16	14	16	14	17	17	17	18	18	18	18	17	17	17	17	17	16	16

Source: DFB
A = Away; H = Home; W = Win; D = Draw; L = Loss

==== Matches ====
The league fixtures were unveiled on 30 June 2023.

30 July 2023 1	Eintracht Braunschweig	0–1	Holstein Kiel	Braunschweig
13:30 UTC+2		Report	Friðjónsson 90+2'	Stadium: Eintracht-Stadion; Attendance: 20,002; Referee: Arne Aarnink

6 August 2023 2	1. FC Magdeburg	2–1	Eintracht Braunschweig	Magdeburg
13:30 UTC+2	Schuler 22'; Conde 32'	Report	Ujah 90+4'	Stadium: MDCC-Arena; Attendance: 28,350; Referee: Daniel Siebert

20 August 2023 3	Eintracht Braunschweig	1–0	Schalke 04	Braunschweig
13:30 UTC+2	Kaufmann 21'	Report		Stadium: Eintracht-Stadion; Attendance: 21,800; Referee: Bastian Dankert

27 August 2023 4	Karlsruher SC	2–0	Eintracht Braunschweig	Karlsruhe
13:30 UTC+2	Jensen 25'; Schleusener 67'	Report		Stadium: Wildparkstadion; Attendance: 23,590; Referee: Robert Kampka

1 September 2023 5	Eintracht Braunschweig	1–1	FC St. Pauli	Braunschweig
18:30 UTC+2	Helgason 80'	Report	Saad 59'	Stadium: Eintracht-Stadion; Attendance: 21,290; Referee: Florian Lechner

17 September 2023 6	Hertha BSC	3–0	Eintracht Braunschweig	Berlin
13:30 UTC+2	Tabakovic 38', 45+2' (pen.), 71'	Report		Stadium: Olympiastadion; Attendance: 43,528; Referee: Marco Fritz

23 September 2023 7	Eintracht Braunschweig	2–2	1. FC Nürnberg	Braunschweig
13:00 UTC+2	Ujah 29', 65'	Report	Okunuki 38'; Goller 40'	Stadium: Eintracht-Stadion; Attendance: 19,798; Referee: Florian Heft

30 September 2023 8	Hansa Rostock	1–0	Eintracht Braunschweig	Rostock
13:00 UTC+2	van der Werff 87'	Report		Stadium: Ostseestadion; Attendance: 26,500; Referee: Daniel Siebert

8 October 2023 9	Eintracht Braunschweig	1–3	SC Paderborn 07	Braunschweig
13:30 UTC+2	Ivanov 39'	Report	Hansen 11' (o.g.); Obermair 27'; Bilbija 90+6'	Stadium: Eintracht-Stadion; Attendance: 19,003; Referee: Florian Badstübner

20 October 2023 10	SV Elversberg	3–0	Eintracht Braunschweig	Spiesen-Elversberg
18:30 UTC+2	Stock 20'; Wanner 43'; Boyamba 90+6'	Report		Stadium: Waldstadion an der Kaiserlinde; Attendance: 8,713; Referee: Robert Hartmann

27 October 2023 11	Eintracht Braunschweig	1–4	Fortuna Düsseldorf	Braunschweig
18:30 UTC+2	Krüger 59'	Report	Tzolis 12'; Vermeij 15'; Siebert 63'; Tanaka 90+8'	Stadium: Eintracht-Stadion; Attendance: 19,333; Referee: Patrick Alt

5 November 2023 12	Hannover 96	2–0	Eintracht Braunschweig	Hannover
13:30 UTC+1	Kunze 12'; Halstenberg 42' (pen.)	Report		Stadium: Heinz von Heiden-Arena; Attendance: 42,000; Referee: Sascha Stegemann

11 November 2023 13	Eintracht Braunschweig	3–2	VfL Osnabrück	Braunschweig
13:00 UTC+2	Gómez 11'; Donkor 71'; Bičakčić 90+8'	Report	Cuisance 45+4' (pen.); Engelhardt 87' (pen.)	Stadium: Eintracht-Stadion; Attendance: 20,327; Referee: Florian Lechner

24 November 2023 14	Hamburger SV	2–1	Eintracht Braunschweig	Hamburg
18:30 UTC+1	Ramos 25'; Pherai 26'	Report	Kaufmann 62'	Stadium: Volksparkstadion; Attendance: 57,000; Referee: Max Burda

2 December 2023 15	Eintracht Braunschweig	0–1	Greuther Fürth	Braunschweig
13:00 UTC+2		Report	Green 31' (pen.)	Stadium: Eintracht-Stadion; Attendance: 17,570; Referee: Daniel Schlager

8 December 2023 16	SV Wehen Wiesbaden	1–3	Eintracht Braunschweig	Wiesbaden
18:30 UTC+1	Vukotić 18'	Report	Kaufmann 48', 76'; Philippe 56'	Stadium: Brita-Arena; Attendance: 7,726; Referee: Max Burda

17 December 2023 17	Eintracht Braunschweig	2–1	1. FC Kaiserslautern	Braunschweig
13:3 UTC+2	Philippe 36'; Gómez 62'	Report	Bičakčić 14' (o.g.)	Stadium: Eintracht-Stadion; Referee: Arne Aarnink

19 January 2024 18	Holstein Kiel	1–2	Eintracht Braunschweig	Kiel
18:30 UTC+1	Skrzybski 11'	Report	Kaufmann 43'; Philippe 56'	Stadium: Holstein-Stadion; Attendance: 15,034; Referee: Tobias Stieler

28 January 2024 19	Eintracht Braunschweig	1–0	1. FC Magdeburg	Braunschweig
13:30 UTC+1	Bičakčić 16'	Report		Stadium: Eintracht-Stadion; Attendance: 22,582; Referee: Bastian Dankert

3 February 2024 20	Schalke 04	1–0	Eintracht Braunschweig	Gelsenkirchen
13:00 UTC+1	Karaman 61'	Report		Stadium: Veltins-Arena; Attendance: 61,219; Referee: Sascha Stegemann

10 February 2024 21	Eintracht Braunschweig	2–0	Karlsruher SC	Braunschweig
13:00 UTC+1	Kurucay 13' (pen.); Bičakčić 75'	Report		Stadium: Eintracht-Stadion; Attendance: 19,595; Referee: Tobias Welz

18 February 2024 22	FC St. Pauli	1–0	Eintracht Braunschweig	Hamburg
13:30 UTC+1	Afolayan 32'	Report		Stadium: Millerntor-Stadion; Attendance: 29,546; Referee: Florian Heft

24 February 2024 23	Eintracht Braunschweig	1–1	Hertha BSC	Braunschweig
13:00 UTC+1	Kaufmann 14'	Report	Maza 52'	Stadium: Eintracht-Stadion; Attendance: 22,636; Referee: Patrick Alt

2 March 2024 24	1. FC Nürnberg	2–1	Eintracht Braunschweig	Nuremberg
13:00 UTC+1		Report		Stadium: Max-Morlock-Stadion

8 March 2024 25	Eintracht Braunschweig	0–1	FC Hansa Rostock	Braunschweig
18:30 UTC+1		Report		Stadium: Eintracht-Stadion

15 March 2024 26	SC Paderborn 07	1–2	Eintracht Braunschweig	Paderborn
18:30 UTC+1		Report		Stadium: Home Deluxe Arena

30 March 2024 27	Eintracht Braunscweig	5–0	SV Elversberg	Braunschweig

7 April 2024 28	Fortuna Düsseldorf	2–0	Eintracht Braunschweig	Düsseldorf

14 April 2024 29	Eintracht Braunschweig	0–0	Hannover 96	Braunschweig

20 April 2024 30	VfL Osnabrück	0–3	Eintracht Braunschweig	Osnabrück

27 April 2024 31	Eintracht Braunschweig	0–4	Hamburger SV	Braunschweig

4 May 2024 32	SpVgg Greuther Fürth	3–3	Eintracht Braunschweig	Fürth

12 May 2024 33	Eintracht Braunschweig	1–0	SV Wehen Wiesbaden	Braunschweig

19 May 2024 34	1. FC Kaiserslautern	5–0	Eintracht Braunschweig	Kaiserslautern

=== DFB-Pokal ===
11 August 2023 First round	Eintracht Braunschweig	1–3	Schalke 04	Braunschweig
20:45 CEST (UTC+2)	Ujah 12'	Report	Karaman 19'; Seguin 42'; Latza 90+4'	Stadium: Eintracht-Stadion; Referee: Patrick Ittrich
