= Anthony Ujah =

Nigerian footballer

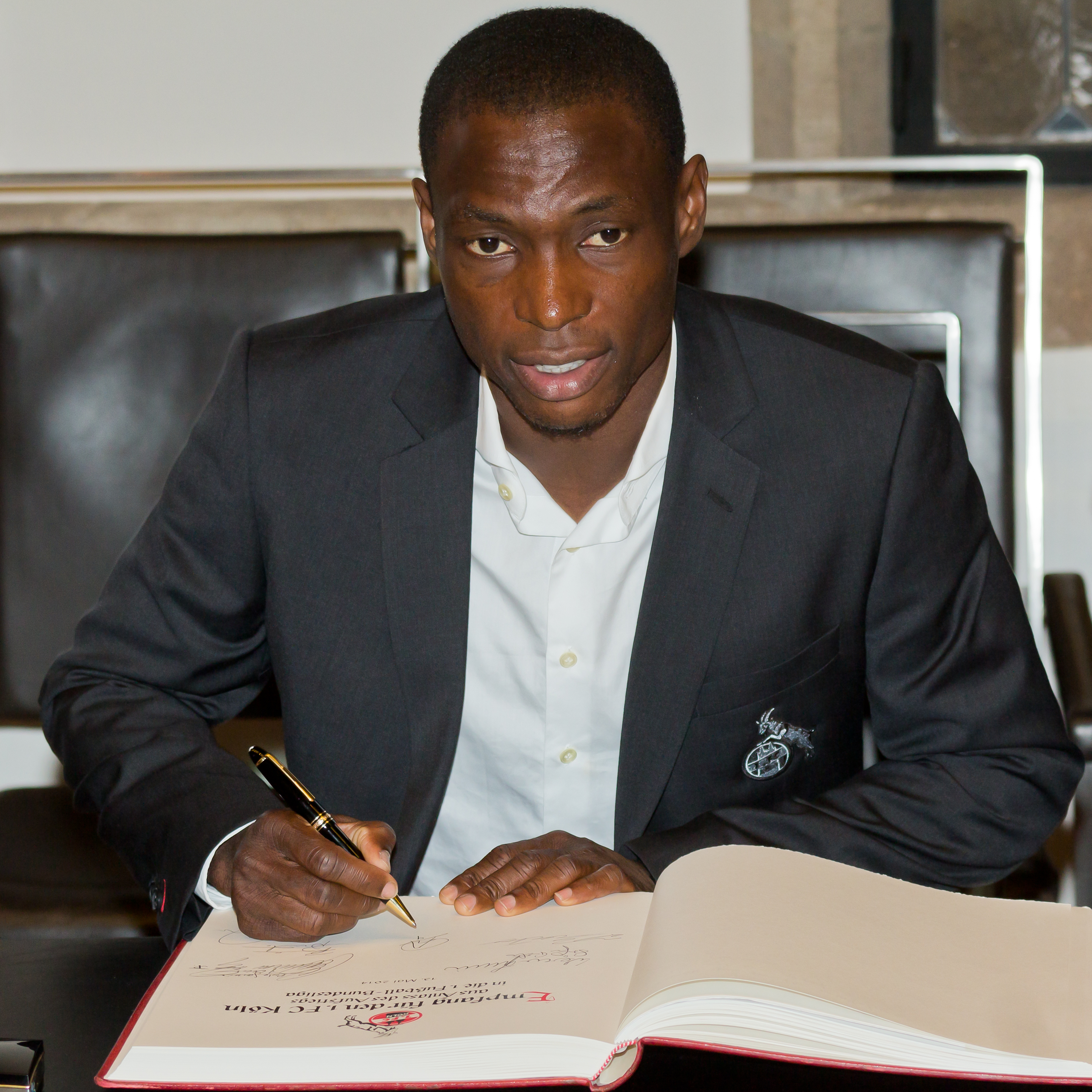
- Ujah during his time with 1. FC Köln

Personal information
- Date of birth: 14 October 1990 (age 36)
- Place of birth: Ugbokolo, Nigeria
- Height: 1.80 m (5 ft 11 in)
- Position: Forward

Senior career*
Years	Team	Apps	(Gls)
2005–2007	Abuja F.C.		
2008–2009	Warri Wolves	22	(13)
2010–2011	Lillestrøm	36	(27)
2011–2013	Mainz 05	12	(2)
2012–2013	→ 1. FC Köln (loan)	28	(13)
2013–2015	1. FC Köln	66	(21)
2015–2016	Werder Bremen	32	(11)
2016–2017	Liaoning Whowin	39	(10)
2018–2019	Mainz 05	33	(4)
2019–2022	Union Berlin	27	(3)
2022–2024	Eintracht Braunschweig	52	(13)
2024–2025	Botev Plovdiv	1	(0)
Total		348	(117)

International career
2013–2015	Nigeria	7	(0)
- * Club domestic league appearances and goals

Anthony Ujah (born 14 October 1990) is a Nigerian former professional footballer who played as a forward, spending most of his career in Germany. He made seven appearances for the Nigeria national team between 2013 and 2015.

== Early life ==
Ujah grew up in the little town of Ugbokolo in Nigeria's Benue State.

== Club career ==
Ujah began his career with Abuja F.C. In 2008, he was signed by Warri Wolves. He left Warri Wolves in January 2010 to attend a trial with Lillestrøm.

=== Lillestrøm ===
==== 2010 season ====
Having impressed while attending the trial, Ujah signed a four-year contract with Lillestrøm and made his debut for the club on 14 March 2010 against Aalesunds FK.

In January 2011, Ujah was linked with a move to England with Football League One clubs Swindon Town and Southampton reportedly interested. On transfer deadline day, Ujah travelled to La Liga side Mallorca to discuss a move after Lillestrøm accepted a bid for the striker. However, no deal was signed, and Ujah started the 2011 campaign still in the Norway with Lillestrøm.

==== 2011 season ====
In the first game of the season on 3 March 2011, Ujah scored four goals in Lillestrøm's 7–0 victory away against Stabæk. Following his strong performance, it was reported that PSV Eindhoven, among other European clubs such as Rennes, Lille, Toulouse and Sunderland, were keeping tabs on Ujah. Ujah added to his tally by scoring a brace in his side's 5–0 of FK Haugesund on 25 April. In May 2011, following his return of eight goals from the first six league matches for Lillestrøm, Ujah was linked to a host of bigger clubs from strong continental leagues including the Bundesliga, Ligue 1 and Eredivisie. A month later on 28 May, Ujah netted the winning goal in a 4–2 victory over Sarpsborg 08. On 19 June 2011, Ujah again hit four goals for Lillestrøm, this time against Strømsgodset, helping his side to a 4–2 win in the Tippeligaen. After just 15 months in Norway, he built up a tremendous rapport with the club's supporters and arguably attained an almost legend-like status unheard of for a 20-year-old. He ended up scoring 30 goals in 42 matches across all official competitions for Lillestrøm.

=== Mainz 05 ===
In June 2011, Ujah signed for Mainz 05, after being tracked by several clubs, most notably Danish outfits F.C. Copenhagen and Brøndby IF. Early in his Mainz career, Ujah missed multiple chances and scored a crucial own goal as Mainz were knocked out of the UEFA Europa League by Gaz Metan Mediaș. Ujah scored his first two goals for his new club in a 3–1 victory over VfB Stuttgart on 4 November, ending his side's winless run that stretched back to mid-August and moved them three points clear of the relegation zone; however, these were the only Bundesliga goals he scored that season, and he made only three substitute appearances after the winter break.

=== 1. FC Köln ===
On the last day of the summer 2012 transfer window, Ujah signed for 1. FC Köln on a season-long loan. He scored 13 goals in the 2012–13 2. Bundesliga and the transfer was made permanent at the end of the season.

Köln won promotion to the Bundesliga in the 2013–14 season, with Ujah forming a strike partnership alongside Patrick Helmes. Ujah was the club's top scorer in the 2014–15 Bundesliga season, scoring 10 goals. In March 2015, Ujah made headlines for his celebration after scoring a goal against Eintracht Frankfurt; the striker ran towards the club's goat mascot, Hennes, and grabbed its horns.

In 2020 Ujah described his spell at Köln as the best time in his career.

=== Werder Bremen ===
On 5 May 2015, Werder Bremen announced that they had triggered Ujah's release clause and he would join the club for the 2015–16 season. On 24 October, Ujah scored a brace against his former club Mainz as Werder earned a 3–1 away win following five successive defeats. Four days later, he scored again, helping Werder to a 1–0 victory over his former club 1. FC Köln in the second round of the DFB-Pokal. It was his first goal in a home match at the Weserstadion.

=== Liaoning Whowin ===
On 5 July 2016, Werder Bremen announced Ujah would be joining Liaoning Whowin pending a medical for a reported transfer fee of €13 million. Both player and club had rejected a similar offer from Liaoning Whowin in the previous winter transfer window. Two days later, the move was finalised with Ujah signing a three-year contract. On 8 July 2016, Ujah scored on his debut for Liaoning in a 2–1 win over Shijiazhuang Ever Bright.

=== Return to Mainz 05 ===
In December, it was announced that Ujah would return to the Bundesliga having re-signed with former club Mainz 05 on a 3 1/2-year contract until 2021. Although he only scored four league goals in his second spell at Mainz, Ujah did help Mainz beat rivals Eintracht Frankfurt 2-0 in May 2019 with a brace.

=== Union Berlin ===
In June 2019, Ujah's move to Union Berlin, newly promoted to the Bundesliga, for the 2019–20 season was agreed. He signed a three-year deal. Ujah contributed three goals in his first season for Union, but spent a long time out injured and was released in summer 2022.

=== Eintracht Braunschweig ===
On 2 August 2022, Ujah signed with Eintracht Braunschweig on a one-year contract, with an optional extra year. His contract was renewed for a second season after Eintracht Braunschweig avoided relegation, with Ujah contributing ten goals and five assists in the 2. Bundesliga.

=== Botev Plovdiv ===
On 19 June 2024, Ujah moved to Bulgaria, signing a deal with Botev Plovdiv. In July 2024, he scored in both legs of the UEFA Europa League qualifying matches against Maribor, which saw Botev Plovdiv prevail 4–3 on aggregate. In August 2024, in the return encounter of the next round against Panathinaikos, Ujah suffered a torn ligament, which subsequently necessitated a knee operation and was expected to sideline him for a number of months.

Ujah announced his retirement from playing on 30 August 2025.

== International career ==
At the end of May 2011, Ujah was called up to the Nigeria national U23 team that faced Tanzania on 5 June 2011.

He was selected for Nigeria's squad at the 2013 FIFA Confederations Cup.

== Career statistics ==
Appearances and goals by club, season and competition
Club	Season	League			Cup		Continental		Total	
Club	Season	Division	Apps	Goals	Apps	Goals	Apps	Goals	Apps	Goals
Warri Wolves		Nigeria Premier League	22	13			—		22	13
Lillestrøm	2010	Tippeligaen	24	14	3	3	—		27	17
Lillestrøm	2011	Tippeligaen	12	13	3	0	—		15	13
Lillestrøm	Total		36	27	6	3	0	0	42	30
Mainz 05	2011–12	Bundesliga	12	2	2	0	2 (Note: Appearances in the Europa League)	0	16	2
Mainz 05	2012–13	Bundesliga	0	0	1	0	—		1	0
Mainz 05	Total		12	2	3	0	2	0	17	2
1. FC Köln (loan)	2012–13	2. Bundesliga	28	13	3	0	—		31	13
1. FC Köln	2013–14	2. Bundesliga	34	11	3	0	—		37	11
1. FC Köln	2014–15	Bundesliga	32	10	3	2	—		35	12
1. FC Köln	Total		66	21	6	2	0	0	72	23
Werder Bremen	2015–16	Bundesliga	32	11	5	3	—		37	14
Liaoning Whowin	2016	Chinese Super League	15	5	0	0	—		15	5
Liaoning Whowin	2017	Chinese Super League	24	5	0	0	—		24	5
Liaoning Whowin	Total		39	10	0	0	0	0	39	10
Mainz 05	2017–18	Bundesliga	11	0	1	0	—		12	0
Mainz 05	2018–19	Bundesliga	22	4	1	0	—		23	4
Mainz 05	Total		33	4	2	0	0	0	35	4
Union Berlin	2019–20	Bundesliga	24	3	4	1	—		28	4
Union Berlin	2020–21	Bundesliga	0	0	0	0	—		0	0
Union Berlin	2021–22	Bundesliga	3	0	0	0	—		3	0
Union Berlin	Total		27	3	4	1	0	0	31	4
Eintracht Braunschweig	2022–23	2. Bundesliga	29	10	1	0	—		30	10
Eintracht Braunschweig	2023–24	2. Bundesliga	23	3	1	1	—		24	4
Eintracht Braunschweig	Total		52	13	2	1	0	0	54	14
Botev Plovdiv	2024–25	Bulgarian First League	1	0	0	0	4	2	5	2
Career total			348	117	31	14	4	0	385	129
