= Ron-Thorben Hoffmann =

German footballer

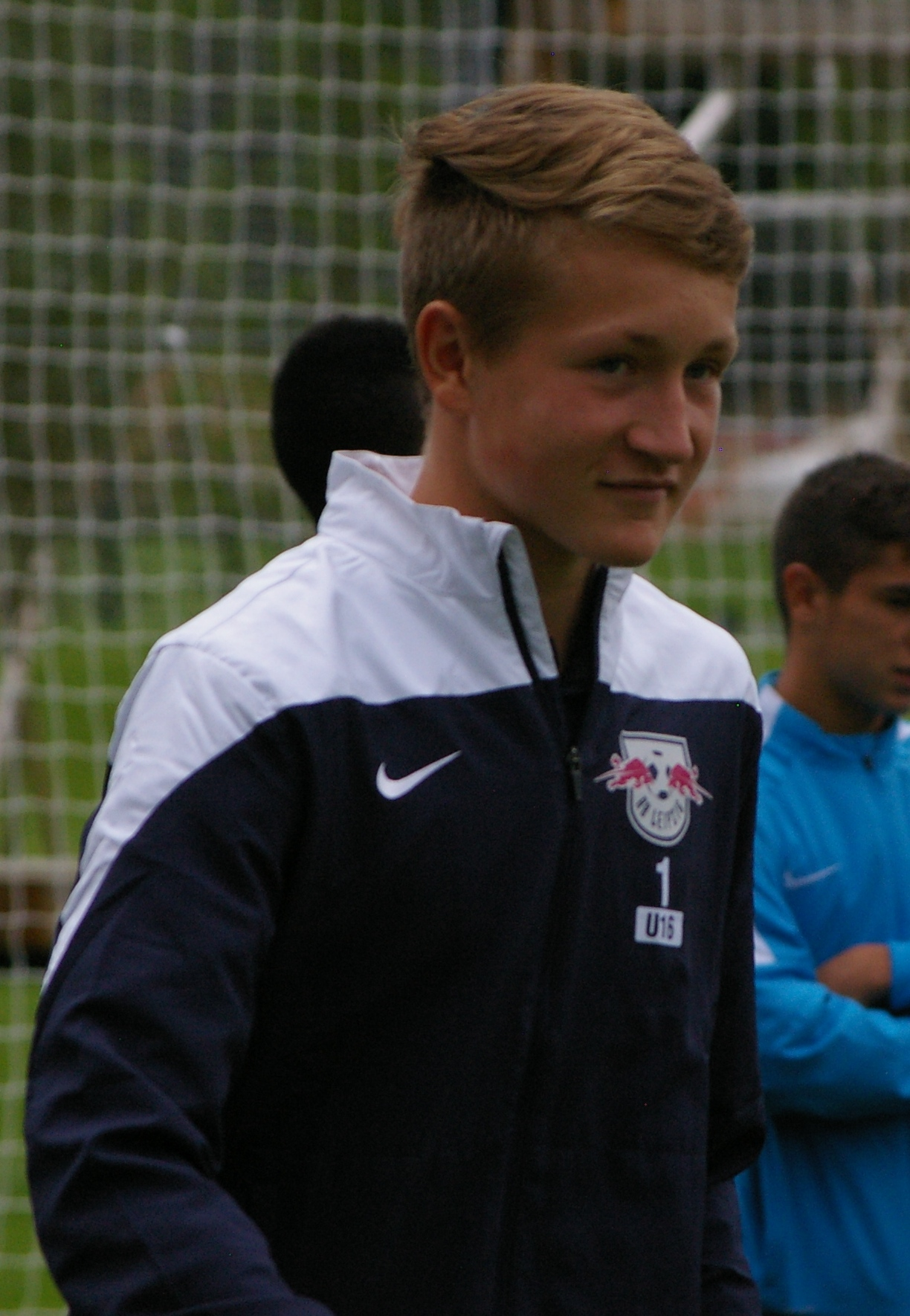
- Hoffmann with RB Leipzig in 2014

Personal information
- Full name: Ron-Thorben Hoffmann
- Date of birth: 4 April 1999 (age 27)
- Place of birth: Rostock, Germany
- Height: 1.92 m (6 ft 4 in)
- Position: Goalkeeper

Team information
- Current team: Eintracht Braunschweig
- Number: 1

Youth career
- 2005–2009: Hansa Rostock
- 2009–2013: Hertha BSC
- 2013–2015: RB Leipzig
- 2015–2018: Bayern Munich

Senior career*
Years	Team	Apps	(Gls)
2018–2022	Bayern Munich II	49	(0)
2018–2022	Bayern Munich	0	(0)
2021–2022	→ Sunderland (loan)	23	(0)
2022–2024	Eintracht Braunschweig	45	(0)
2024–2025	Schalke 04	2	(0)
2025	→ Eintracht Braunschweig (loan)	15	(0)
2025–	Eintracht Braunschweig	32	(0)

International career
2016	Germany U18	2	(0)
- * Club domestic league appearances and goals as of 18 May 2026

Ron-Thorben Hoffmann (born 4 April 1999) is a German professional footballer who plays as a goalkeeper for 2. Bundesliga club Eintracht Braunschweig.

== Club career ==
=== Bayern Munich ===
Hoffmann made his 3. Liga debut for Bayern Munich II on 30 July 2019, starting in the away match against Hansa Rostock.

==== Loan to Sunderland ====
On 31 August 2021, he was loaned to Sunderland AFC for the 2021-22 season. Prior to the loan move, Hoffmann signed a one-year contract extension to keep him with FC Bayern through 2023.

=== Eintracht Braunschweig ===
On 15 June 2022, Bayern Munich announced Hoffmann's departure as he would be transferred to recently promoted 2. Bundesliga club Eintracht Braunschweig, for a reported €300,000 fee.

=== Schalke 04 ===
On 31 May 2024, Hoffmann moved to Schalke 04 on a free transfer, signing a three-year contract.

=== Eintracht Braunschweig ===
On 14 January 2025, he returned to Eintracht Braunschweig on loan until the end of the season with an obligation to buy if the club avoid relegation. Since the club won the relegation play-offs against 1. FC Saarbrücken, the obligation to buy came into effect.

== International career ==
Hoffmann made two appearances for the German under-18 national team in 2016, debuting at half-time in a friendly match against the Republic of Ireland on 13 November 2016.

== Career statistics ==
As of match played 17 May 2026

Appearances and goals by club, season and competition
Club	Season	League			Cup		Other		Total	
Club	Season	Division	Apps	Goals	Apps	Goals	Apps	Goals	Apps	Goals
Bayern Munich	2017–18	Bundesliga	0	0	0	0	—		0	0
Bayern Munich	2018–19	Bundesliga	0	0	0	0	—		0	0
Bayern Munich	2019–20	Bundesliga	0	0	0	0	—		0	0
Bayern Munich	2020–21	Bundesliga	0	0	0	0	—		0	0
Bayern Munich	Total		0	0	0	0	—		0	0
Bayern Munich II	2018–19	Regionalliga Bayern	13	0	—		2 (Note: Appearances in Regionalliga promotion play-offs)	0	15	0
Bayern Munich II	2019–20	3. Liga	11	0	—		—		11	0
Bayern Munich II	2020–21	3. Liga	25	0	—		—		25	0
Bayern Munich II	Total		49	0	—		2	0	51	0
Sunderland (loan)	2021–22	League One	23	0	0	0	1 (Note: Appearance in EFL Trophy)	0	24	0
Eintracht Braunschweig	2022–23	2. Bundesliga	12	0	0	0	—		12	0
Eintracht Braunschweig	2023–24	2. Bundesliga	33	0	1	0	—		34	0
Eintracht Braunschweig	Total		45	0	1	0	—		46	0
Schalke 04	2024–25	2. Bundesliga	2	0	1	0	—		3	0
Eintracht Braunschweig (loan)	2024–25	2. Bundesliga	15	0	—		2 (Note: Appearances in 2. Bundesliga relegation play-offs.)	0	17	0
Eintracht Braunschweig	2025–26	2. Bundesliga	32	0	1	0	—		33	0
Eintracht Braunschweig	Braunschweig total		47	0	1	0	2	0	50	0
Career total			166	0	3	0	5	0	174	0

== Honours ==
Bayern Munich

- Bundesliga: 2018–19
- UEFA Champions League: 2019–20
- FIFA Club World Cup: 2020

Sunderland

- EFL League One play-offs: 2022
