= Johan Gomez =

American soccer player (born 2001)

Johan Gómez
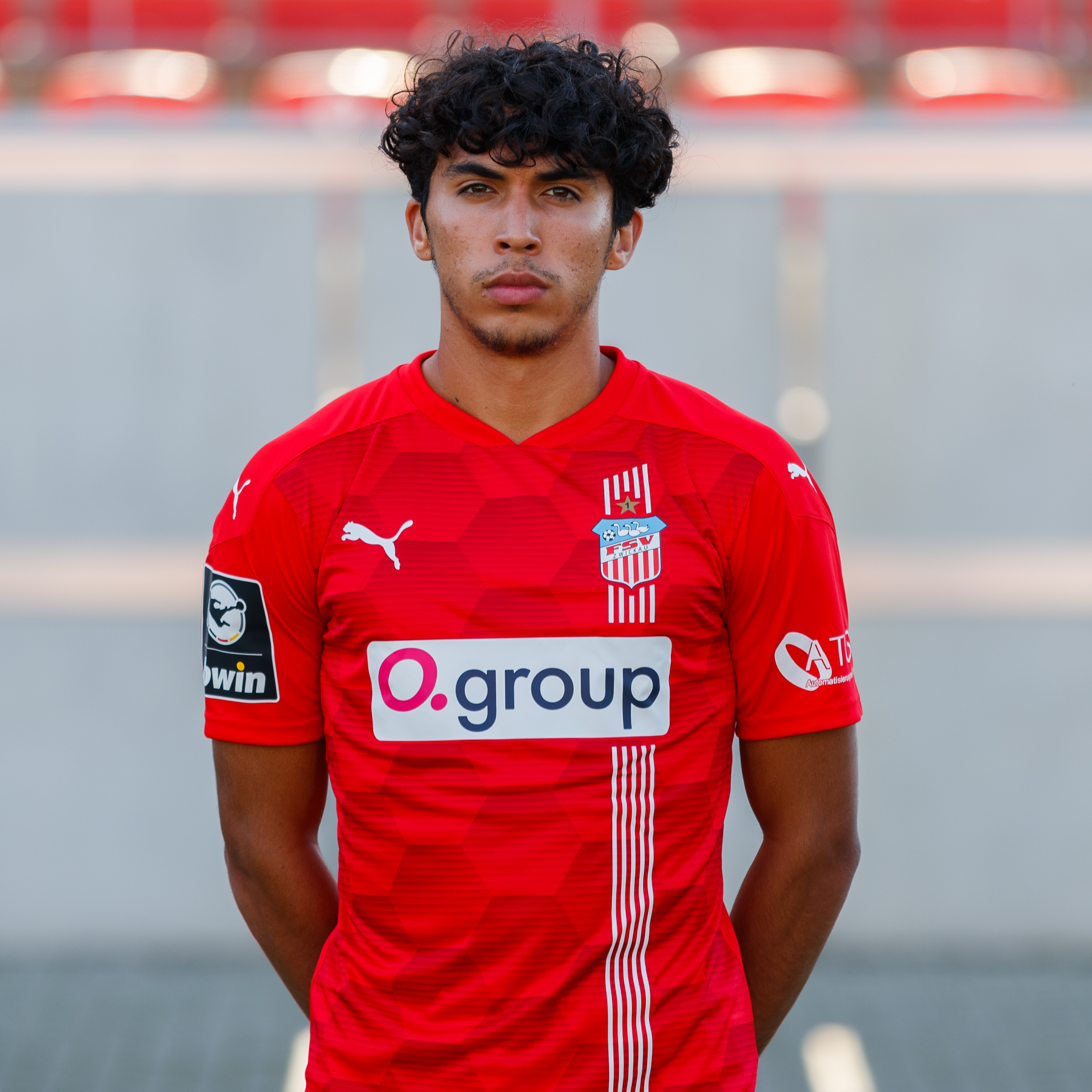
- Gómez with FSV Zwickau in 2021

Personal information
- Full name: Johan Arath Gómez Mendoza
- Date of birth: July 23, 2001 (age 25)
- Place of birth: Arlington, Texas, United States
- Height: 5 ft 9 in (1.75 m)
- Position: Attacking midfielder

Team information
- Current team: Chicago Fire
- Number: 18

Youth career
- 2013–2019: Dallas
- 2019–2021: Porto

Senior career*
| Years | Team | Apps | (Gls) |
| 2019 | North Texas SC | 6 | (1) |
| 2020–2021 | Porto B | 23 | (1) |
| 2021–2023 | FSV Zwickau | 69 | (12) |
| 2023–2026 | Eintracht Braunschweig | 93 | (4) |
| 2026– | Chicago Fire | 10 | (1) |

International career
| 2019–2021 | United States U20 | 2 | (1) |
| 2023–2024 | United States U23 | 7 | (2) |
- * Club domestic league appearances and goals as of November 17, 2026

Johan Arath Gómez Mendoza (born July 23, 2001) is an American professional soccer player who plays as an attacking midfielder for Major League Soccer club Chicago Fire.

== Personal life ==
Gómez is of Mexican descent. He is the older brother of Jonathan Gómez who plays for Real Sociedad B in the Segunda División. He began his soccer career at the age of 7, joining local Dallas club Solar. At the age of 12, Gomez moved on to the FC Dallas Academy, where he played until he turned 18, racking up over 200 goals throughout his FC Dallas youth career.

== Career ==
On July 8, 2021, Gómez signed with 3. Liga side FSV Zwickau.

On June 13, 2023, Gómez moved to 2. Bundesliga side Eintracht Braunschweig on a two-year contract.

== International career ==
Having previously represented the United States at the under-20 level, Gomez was called up to the United States under-23 national team on October 8, 2023, ahead of friendlies against Mexico and Japan.

== Career statistics ==
As of May 19, 2024

Appearances and goals by club, season and competition
| Club | Season | League | | | National cup (Note: Includes DFB-Pokal) | | Continental | | Other | | Total | |
| Club | Season | Division | Apps | Goals | Apps | Goals | Apps | Goals | Apps | Goals | Apps | Goals |
|---|---|---|---|---|---|---|---|---|---|---|---|---|
| North Texas SC | 2019 | USL League One | 6 | 1 | — | | — | | — | | 6 | 1 |
| FC Porto B | 2020–21 | LigaPro | 23 | 1 | — | | — | | — | | 23 | 1 |
| FSV Zwickau | 2021–22 | 3. Liga | 34 | 6 | — | | — | | 3 (Note: Appearances in Sachsenpokal) | 0 | 37 | 6 |
| FSV Zwickau | 2022–23 | 3. Liga | 35 | 6 | — | | — | | 3 | 3 | 38 | 9 |
| FSV Zwickau | Total | | 69 | 12 | — | | — | | 6 | 3 | 75 | 15 |
| Eintracht Braunschweig | 2023–24 | 2. Bundesliga | 34 | 3 | 1 | 0 | — | | — | | 35 | 3 |
| Career total | | | 132 | 17 | 7 | 3 | 0 | 0 | 0 | 0 | 139 | 20 |
