= Maurice Multhaup =

German footballer

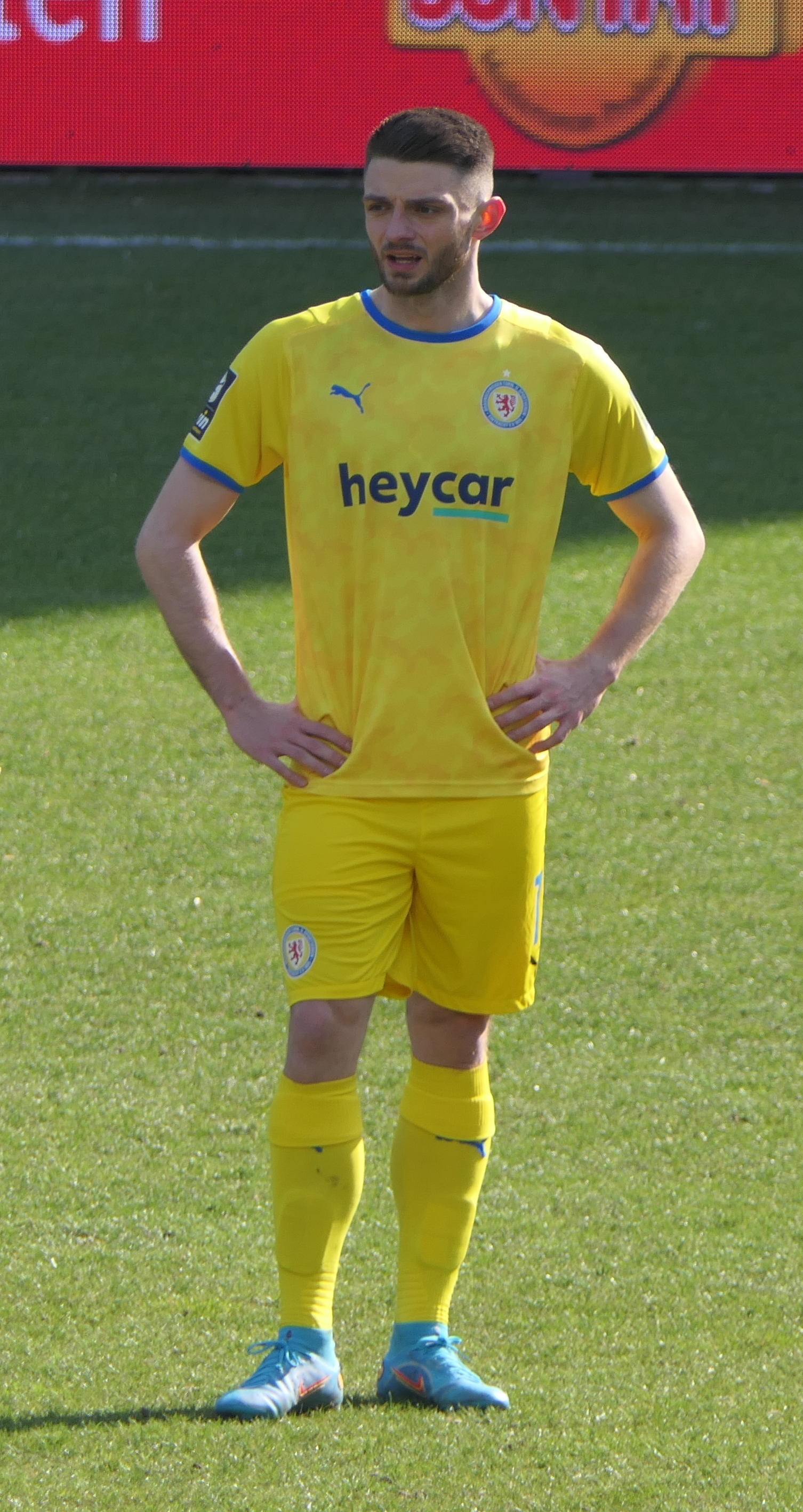

Personal information
- Date of birth: 15 December 1996 (age 29)
- Place of birth: Bottrop, Germany
- Height: 1.73 m (5 ft 8 in)
- Position: Winger

Team information
- Current team: 1. FC Saarbrücken
- Number: 11

Youth career
- 2002–2008: VfB Kirchhellen
- 2008–2009: Wattenscheid 09
- 2009–2015: Schalke 04

Senior career*
Years	Team	Apps	(Gls)
2015–2018	FC Ingolstadt	5	(0)
2015–2018	FC Ingolstadt II	16	(4)
2018–2020	1. FC Heidenheim	40	(2)
2020–2021	VfL Osnabrück	26	(2)
2021–2024	Eintracht Braunschweig	70	(9)
2024–	1. FC Saarbrücken	45	(8)

International career^{‡}
2011	Germany U15	2	(0)
2011–2012	Germany U16	2	(1)
2012–2013	Germany U17	13	(7)
- * Club domestic league appearances and goals as of 30 May 2026 ‡ National team caps and goals as of 17:59, 3 April 2024 (UTC)

Maurice Multhaup (born 15 December 1996) is a German professional footballer who plays as a winger for 3. Liga club 1. FC Saarbrücken.

Born in Bottrop, Multhaup played for Schalke 04 before moving to FC Ingolstadt in 2015. He subsequently played for 1. FC Heidenheim and VfL Osnabrück before joining current club Eintracht Braunschweig in 2021. He represented Germany up to under-17 level.

== Early life ==
Multhaup was born and raised in Bottrop. He was a childhood fan of Schalke 04, with his family also supporting the club.

== Club career ==
=== Early career ===
Multhaup played youth football for VfB Kirchhellen and Wattenscheid 09, before joining Schalke 04 in 2009. He won the Under 19 Bundesliga with Schalke in 2014–15. In August 2015, he moved to Bundesliga club FC Ingolstadt on a three-year contract. He made his Bundesliga debut on 12 December 2015 as a substitute in a 2–0 defeat to Bayern Munich. Multhaup made 5 Bundesliga appearances across two-and-a-half years for Ingolstadt, with Multhaup having struggled with injuries whilst at the club. He also scored 4 times in 16 Regionalliga Bayern matches for FC Ingolstadt II.

=== 1. FC Heidenheim ===
In January 2018, Multhaup signed for 2. Bundesliga club 1. FC Heidenheim on a contract until 2020. Multhaup's recovery from a knee injury meant he did not join first-team training at Heidenheim until April 2018 and thus did not appear for the club during the 2017–18 season. He made his first start for the club in a 5–2 DFB-Pokal win over SSV Jeddeloh, and scored his first goal for Heidenheim in November 2018 in a 5–1 league defeat to SC Paderborn. He made 20 2. Bundesliga appearances during the 2018–19 season, 8 of which were starts. He made 6 starts and 14 substitute appearances across the 2019–20 season as Heidenheim finished 3rd in the 2. Bundesliga before being defeated by Werder Bremen in the promotion play-off. He left Heidenheim at the end of the season as his contract was not renewed.

=== VfL Osnabrück ===
In August 2020, Multhaup joined VfL Osnabrück on a two-year contract. He scored twice in 26 matches across the regular season as Osnabrück finished 16th. Osnabrück were relegated after losing to Multhaup's former club Ingolstadt in the subsequent relegation play-off, with Multhaup having appeared in both legs.

=== Eintracht Braunschweig ===
In summer 2021, Multhaup signed for 3. Liga club Eintracht Braunschweig on a two-year contract. He was a regular starter during the 2021–22 season, scoring 7 goals across 29 starts and 3 substitute appearances as Braunschweig won promotion to the 2. Bundesliga. In June 2022, he extended his contract with the club until summer 2024. He scored twice in 30 2. Bundesliga appearances across the 2022–23 season.

=== Saarbrücken ===
On 15 May 2024, Multhaup signed a contract with 1. FC Saarbrücken in 3. Liga.

== International career ==
Multhaup received his first call-up to a Germany youth national team in 2011, when he made two appearances for the under-15s against Portugal in June of that year. He subsequently played for both the under-16 and under-17 teams.

== Style of play ==
Multhaup is right-footed, and plays primarily as a winger. Upon signing for Osnabrück, sporting director Benjamin Schmedes described him as a versatile attacker and noted his speed, agility and dribbling ability.

== Career statistics ==
As of match played 21 March 2026

Appearances and goals by club, season and competition
Club	Season	League			DFB-Pokal		Other		Total	
Club	Season	Division	Apps	Goals	Apps	Goals	Apps	Goals	Apps	Goals
FC Ingolstadt	2015–16	Bundesliga	4	0	0	0	0	0	4	0
FC Ingolstadt	2016–17	Bundesliga	1	0	0	0	0	0	1	0
FC Ingolstadt	Total		5	0	0	0	0	0	5	0
FC Ingolstadt II	2015–16	Regionalliga Bayern	4	0	—		0	0	4	0
FC Ingolstadt II	2016–17	Regionalliga Bayern	5	2	—		0	0	5	2
FC Ingolstadt II	2017–18	Regionalliga Bayern	7	2	—		0	0	7	2
FC Ingolstadt II	Total		16	4	0	0	0	0	16	4
1. FC Heidenheim	2018–19	2. Bundesliga	20	1	4	1	0	0	24	2
1. FC Heidenheim	2019–20	2. Bundesliga	20	1	1	0	2 (Note: Appearance(s) in Bundesliga relegation play-off.)	0	23	1
1. FC Heidenheim	Total		40	2	5	1	2	0	47	3
VfL Osnabrück	2020–21	2. Bundesliga	26	2	1	0	2 (Note: Appearance(s) in 2. Bundesliga relegation play-off.)	0	29	2
Eintracht Braunschweig	2021–22	3. Liga	32	7	1	0	0	0	33	7
Eintracht Braunschweig	2022–23	2. Bundesliga	30	2	1	1	0	0	31	3
Eintracht Braunschweig	2023–24	2. Bundesliga	8	0	1	0	0	0	9	0
Eintracht Braunschweig	Total		70	9	3	1	0	0	73	10
1. FC Saarbrücken	2024–25	3. Liga	25	4	0	0	1	0	26	4
1. FC Saarbrücken	2025–26	3. Liga	12	2	1	0	0	0	13	2
1. FC Saarbrücken	Total		37	6	1	0	1	0	39	2
Career total			194	23	10	2	5	0	209	21

== Honours ==
Schalke 04 U19

- Under 19 Bundesliga: 2014–15
- DFB-Pokal U19 runner-up: 2013–14
