= Amoros Nshimirimana =

Association football player

Personal information
- Date of birth: 7 August 2001 (age 25)
- Place of birth: Bujumbura, Burundi
- Height: 1.82 m (6 ft 0 in)
- Position: Forward

Youth career
- VV Jonathan
- 2015–2019: Utrecht
- 2019–2022: Willem II
- 2022: Willem II

Senior career*
Years	Team	Apps	(Gls)
2022	Helmond Sport	4	(0)
2022–2023	SV Straelen	2	(0)
2023	SteDoCo	5	(1)
2023–2024	Igalo	5	(0)
2024	Glacis United	6	(2)

International career
2016	Netherlands U15	1	(0)
- * Club domestic league appearances and goals as of 1 July 2024

Amoros Nshimirimana (born 7 August 2001) is a professional footballer who plays as a forward. Born in Burundi, he has represented the Netherlands at youth international level.

== Club career ==
A former youth academy player of Utrecht and Willem II, Nshimirimana joined Helmond Sport in January 2022. He made his professional debut for the club on 4 February 2022 in a 2–0 defeat against Jong PSV.

On 31 May 2022, Willem II announced the return of Nshimirimana to their U21 team. Two months later in July 2022, he joined German Regionalliga club SV Straelen. He made his debut for the club on 30 July by scoring a goal in a 3–4 DFB-Pokal defeat against FC St. Pauli.

== International career ==
Nshimirimana is a former Dutch youth international. He have made an appearance for under-15 team in 2016.

== Personal life ==
Born in Burundi, Nshimirimana moved to the Netherlands at the age of nine.

== Career statistics ==
=== Club ===
As of 6 August 2022

Appearances and goals by club, season and competition
Club	Season	League			Cup		Other		Total	
Club	Season	Division	Apps	Goals	Apps	Goals	Apps	Goals	Apps	Goals
Helmond Sport	2021–22	Eerste Divisie	4	0	0	0	—		4	0
SV Straelen	2022–23	Regionalliga West	1	0	1	1	—		2	1
Career total			5	0	1	1	0	0	6	1
