= Anton Donkor =

German footballer (born 1997)

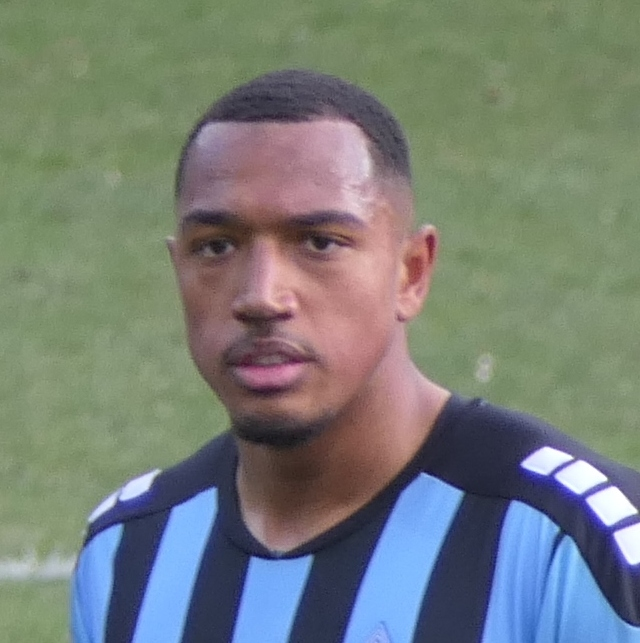
- Donkor in 2022

Personal information
- Full name: Anton-Leander Donkor
- Date of birth: 11 November 1997 (age 29)
- Place of birth: Göttingen, Germany
- Height: 1.85 m (6 ft 1 in)
- Position: Left-back

Team information
- Current team: Schalke 04 II

Youth career
- 2002–2008: RSV Göttingen 05
- 2008–2012: SG Lenglern
- 2012–2016: VfL Wolfsburg
- 2017: → Everton (loan)

Senior career*
Years	Team	Apps	(Gls)
2016–2019	VfL Wolfsburg II	18	(1)
2018–2019	→ Hansa Rostock (loan)	9	(1)
2018–2019	→ Hansa Rostock II (loan)	5	(3)
2019–2020	Carl Zeiss Jena	29	(2)
2020–2022	Waldhof Mannheim	65	(4)
2022–2024	Eintracht Braunschweig	65	(5)
2024–2026	Schalke 04	28	(0)
2025–	Schalke 04 II	12	(0)

International career
2014–2015	Germany U18	3	(0)
2016	Germany U20	4	(0)
- * Club domestic league appearances and goals as of 23 September 2026

Anton-Leander Donkor (born 11 November 1997) is a German professional footballer who plays as a left-back for Regionalliga West club Schalke 04 II.

== Career ==
In January 2017, Donkor joined Premier League side Everton on loan until the end of the season, joining up with the club's under-23 side. In July 2017, after an injury hit first spell, he rejoined Everton on loan until January 2018. On 12 June 2019, Donkor joined FC Carl Zeiss Jena on a two-year deal. On 26 July 2020, Donkor joined SV Waldhof Mannheim.

On 8 June 2022, he moved to Eintracht Braunschweig with a two-year contract.

On 14 May 2024, Schalke 04 announced that they had signed Donkor on a free transfer until 30 June 2027.

== Personal life ==
Born in Germany, Donkor is of Ghanaian descent.

== Career statistics ==
As of match played 14 August 2026

Appearances and goals by club, season and competition
Club	Season	League			DFB-Pokal		Total	
Club	Season	Division	Apps	Goals	Apps	Goals	Apps	Goals
VfL Wolfsburg II	2016–17	Regionalliga Nord	12	1	—		12	1
VfL Wolfsburg II	2017–18	Regionalliga Nord	6	0	—		6	0
VfL Wolfsburg II	Total		18	1	—		18	1
Hansa Rostock II	2018–19	NOFV-Oberliga	5	3	—		5	3
Hansa Rostock	2018–19	3. Liga	9	1	1	0	10	1
Carl Zeiss Jena	2019–20	3. Liga	29	2	—		29	2
Waldhof Mannheim	2020–21	3. Liga	32	4	1	0	33	4
Waldhof Mannheim	2021–22	3. Liga	33	0	2	0	35	0
Waldhof Mannheim	Total		65	4	3	0	68	4
Eintracht Braunschweig	2022–23	2. Bundesliga	32	3	2	0	34	3
Eintracht Braunschweig	2023–24	2. Bundesliga	33	2	1	0	34	2
Eintracht Braunschweig	Total		65	5	3	0	68	5
Schalke 04	2024–25	2. Bundesliga	26	0	2	0	28	0
Schalke 04	2025–26	2. Bundesliga	2	0	1	0	3	0
Schalke 04	Total		28	0	3	0	31	0
Schalke 04 II	2025–26	Regionalliga West	5	0	—		5	0
Schalke 04 II	2026–27	Regionalliga West	2	0	—		2	0
Schalke 04 II	Total		7	0	—		7	0
Career total			226	16	10	0	236	16

== Honours ==
Everton U23

- Premier League 2 Division 1: 2016–17

Hansa Rostock

- Mecklenburg-Vorpommern Cup: 2018–19

Schalke 04

- 2. Bundesliga: 2025–26
