= Yannik Bangsow =

German footballer

Personal information
- Date of birth: 21 February 1998 (age 28)
- Place of birth: Mannheim, Germany
- Height: 1.92 m (6 ft 4 in)
- Position: Goalkeeper

Team information
- Current team: SV Babelsberg 03
- Number: 1

Youth career
- –2014: Tennis Borussia Berlin
- 2014–2015: RB Leipzig
- 2015–2016: Eintracht Braunschweig

Senior career*
Years	Team	Apps	(Gls)
2016–2018	Eintracht Braunschweig II	44	(0)
2018–2024	Eintracht Braunschweig	2	(0)
2020–2021	→ Viktoria Köln (loan)	2	(0)
2022–2023	→ Alemannia Aachen (loan)	13	(0)
2024–	SV Babelsberg 03	10	(0)
- * Club domestic league appearances and goals as of 1 January 2025

Yannik Bangsow (born 21 February 1998) is a German professional footballer who plays for SV Babelsberg 03.

== Club career ==
Bangsow joined Alemannia Aachen on loan for the 2021–22 season.
