= Lion Lauberbach =

German footballer

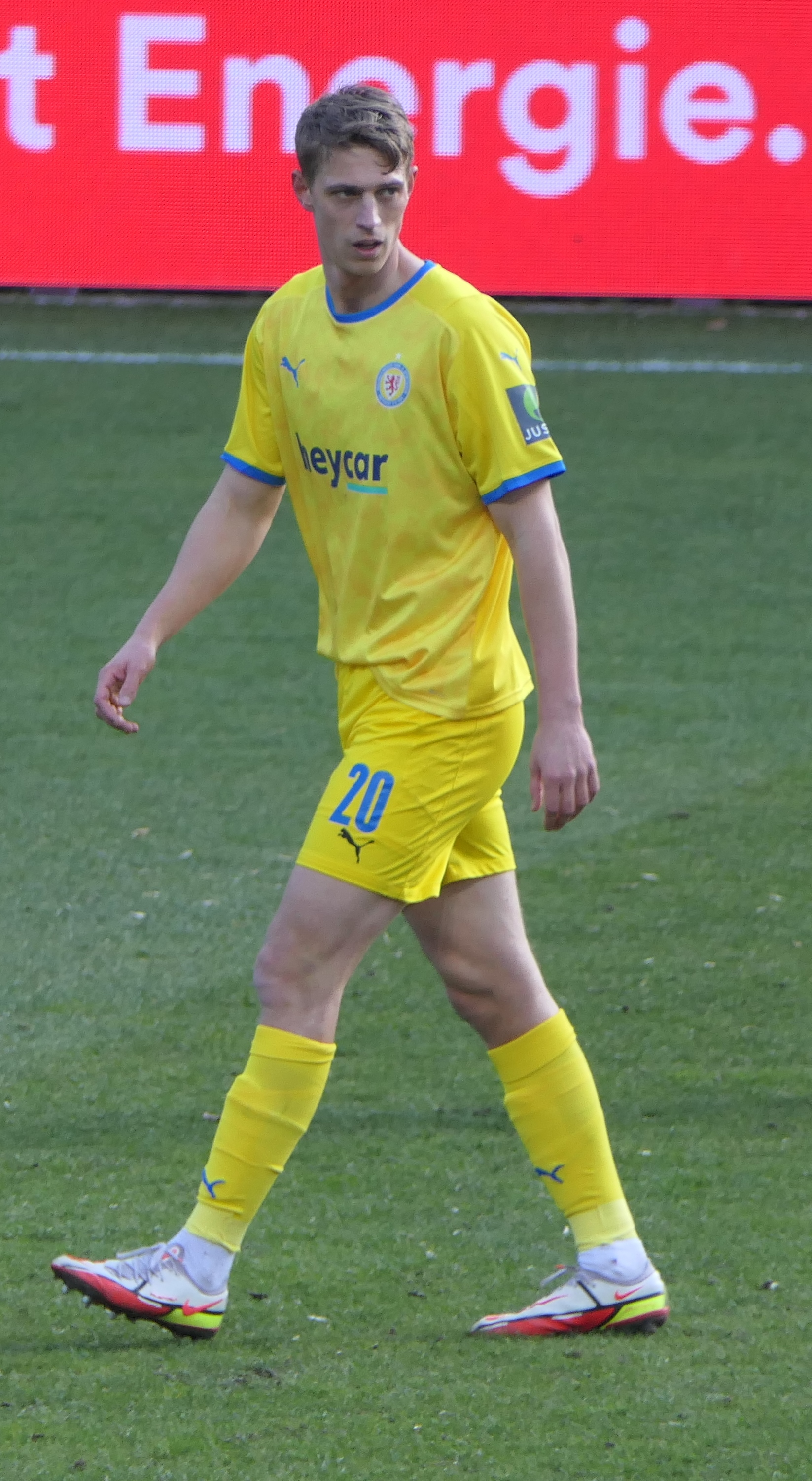
- Lauberbach playing for Eintracht Braunschweig in 2022

Personal information
- Date of birth: 15 February 1998 (age 28)
- Place of birth: Erfurt, Germany
- Height: 1.94 m (6 ft 4 in)
- Positions: Centre forward; left winger

Team information
- Current team: Venezia
- Number: 29

Youth career
- 2006–2017: Rot-Weiß Erfurt

Senior career*
Years	Team	Apps	(Gls)
2017–2018	Rot-Weiß Erfurt	23	(1)
2018–2019	FSV Zwickau	27	(4)
2019–2021	Holstein Kiel	24	(3)
2020–2021	→ Hansa Rostock (loan)	11	(0)
2021–2023	Eintracht Braunschweig	66	(16)
2023–2026	Mechelen	90	(19)
2026–	Venezia	12	(1)
- * Club domestic league appearances and goals as of 12 May 2026

Lion Lauberbach (born 15 February 1998) is a German professional footballer who plays as a centre-forward or left winger for Serie A club Venezia.

== Career ==
In June 2019, it was announced Lauberbach would join 2. Bundesliga side Holstein Kiel from FSV Zwickau for an undisclosed transfer fee having agreed a three-year contract.

He moved to on loan to until the end half of 2020–21 season in January 2020.

On 29 January 2026, Lauberbach signed a three-and-a-half-year contract with Venezia in Serie B, with an additional conditional one-year automatic renewal option.
