= Bryan Henning =

German footballer (born 1995)

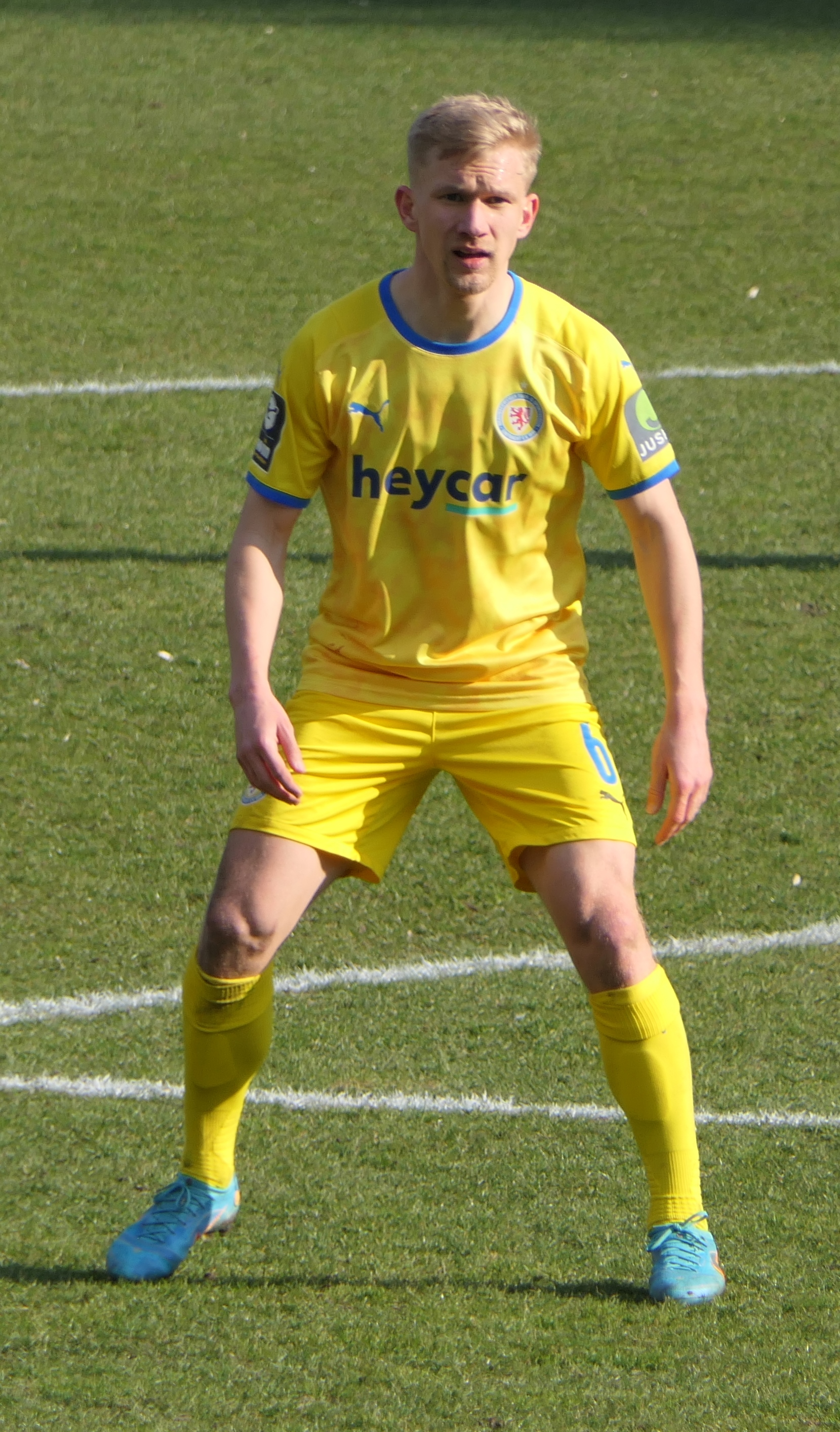
- Henning with Eintracht Braunschweig in 2022

Personal information
- Date of birth: 16 March 1995 (age 31)
- Place of birth: Berlin, Germany
- Height: 1.72 m (5 ft 8 in)
- Position: Midfielder

Team information
- Current team: VfL Osnabrück
- Number: 6

Youth career
- 2002–2008: FC Nordost Berlin
- 2008–2012: Union Berlin

Senior career*
Years	Team	Apps	(Gls)
2014–2015	Union Berlin II	28	(3)
2015–2017	Hertha BSC II	57	(3)
2017–2018	Hansa Rostock	35	(5)
2018–2019	Wacker Innsbruck	27	(0)
2019–2021	VfL Osnabrück	53	(2)
2021–2023	Eintracht Braunschweig	58	(7)
2023–2025	Viktoria Köln	28	(3)
2025–	VfL Osnabrück	38	(2)
- * Club domestic league appearances and goals as of 28 May 2026

Bryan Henning (born 16 March 1995) is a German professional footballer who plays as a midfielder for 2. Bundesliga club VfL Osnabrück.

== Career ==
After spending one season in the Austrian Bundesliga with Wacker Innsbruck, Henning returned to Germany to join 2. Bundesliga side VfL Osnabrück for the 2019–20 season.

On 21 June 2023, Henning signed with Viktoria Köln.

On 3 January 2025, Henning returned to VfL Osnabrück, now in 3. Liga.

== Honours ==
VfL Osnabrück

- 3. Liga: 2025–26
