= Danilo Wiebe =

German footballer

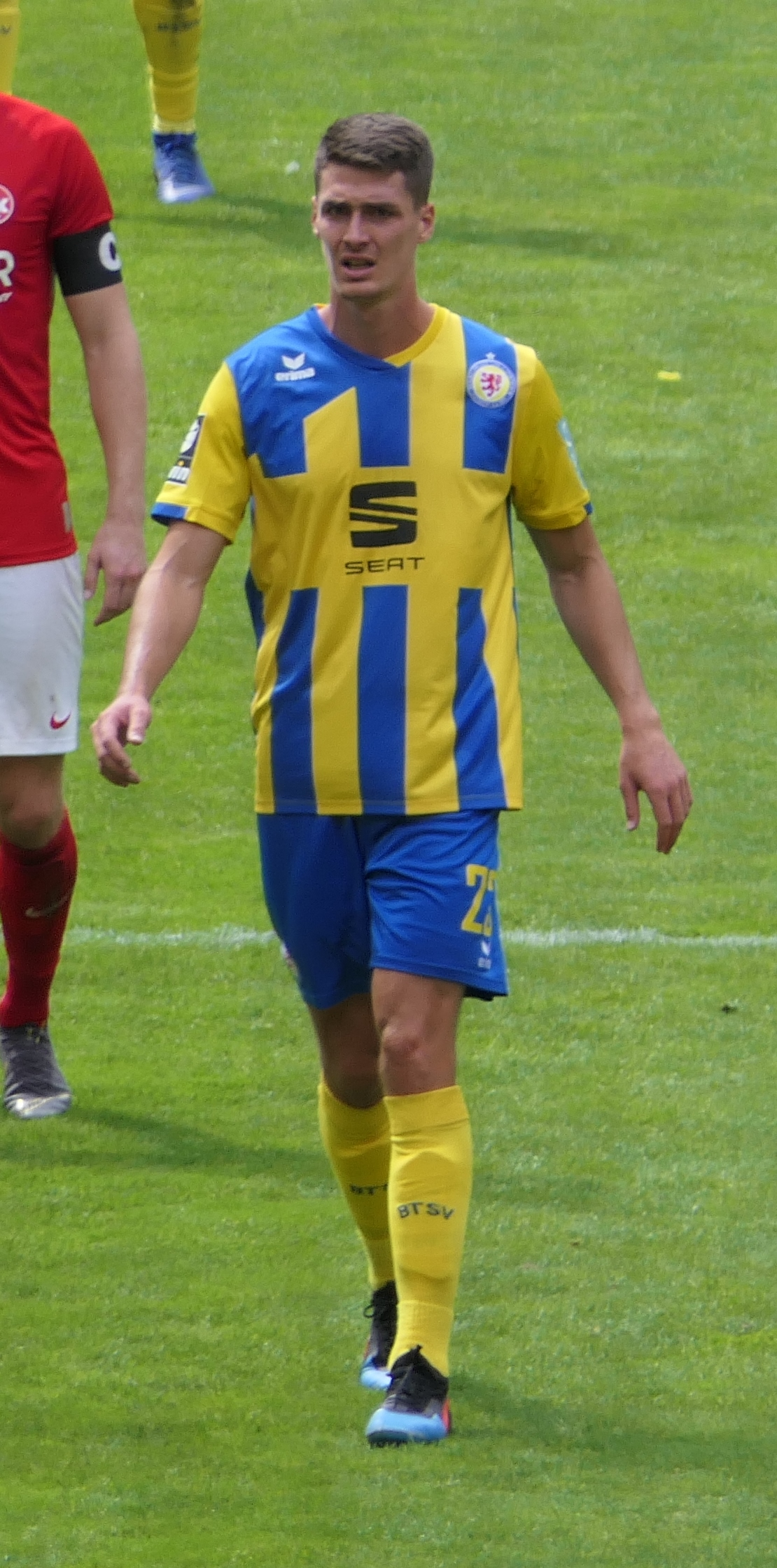
- Wiebe in 2019

Personal information
- Date of birth: 22 March 1994 (age 32)
- Place of birth: Siegburg, Germany
- Height: 1.87 m (6 ft 2 in)
- Position: Midfielder

Team information
- Current team: Alemannia Aachen
- Number: 28

Youth career
- SSV Kaldauen
- –2009: Bonner SC
- 2009–2013: 1. FC Köln

Senior career*
Years	Team	Apps	(Gls)
2013–2015	1. FC Köln II	48	(0)
2015–2019	Preußen Münster	58	(2)
2019–2024	Eintracht Braunschweig	108	(4)
2025–	Alemannia Aachen	46	(3)
- * Club domestic league appearances and goals as of 28 May 2026

Danilo Wiebe (born 22 March 1994) is a German professional footballer who plays as a midfielder for 3. Liga side Alemannia Aachen.

== Playing career ==
Born in Siegburg, Wiebe played for local clubs SSV Kaldauen and Bonner SC as a youth. In 2009, he joined the youth system of 1. FC Köln. He helped them win the DFB Junioren Pokal (German Youth Cup) during the 2012–13 season. Wiebe then got promoted to the Köln reserve team in June 2013.

Wiebe went on to make 48 Regionalliga West appearances for the Köln reserves during the 2013–14 and 2014–15 seasons.

In June 2015, Wiebe signed a one-year contract with 3. Liga side Preußen Münster. He made his professional debut on 31 July during a 3–1 win over Stuttgart II, where he replaced Amaury Bischoff after 80 minutes. He scored his first professional goal on 5 September in a 3–1 win over Werder Bremen II. Firing from outside the penalty box, he tucked the ball into the top right corner of the goal with a right-footed strike. His goal came only six minutes after he was substituted into the game.

On 6 January 2025, Wiebe joined Alemannia Aachen in 3. Liga.
