= Fabio Kaufmann =

German footballer (born 1992)

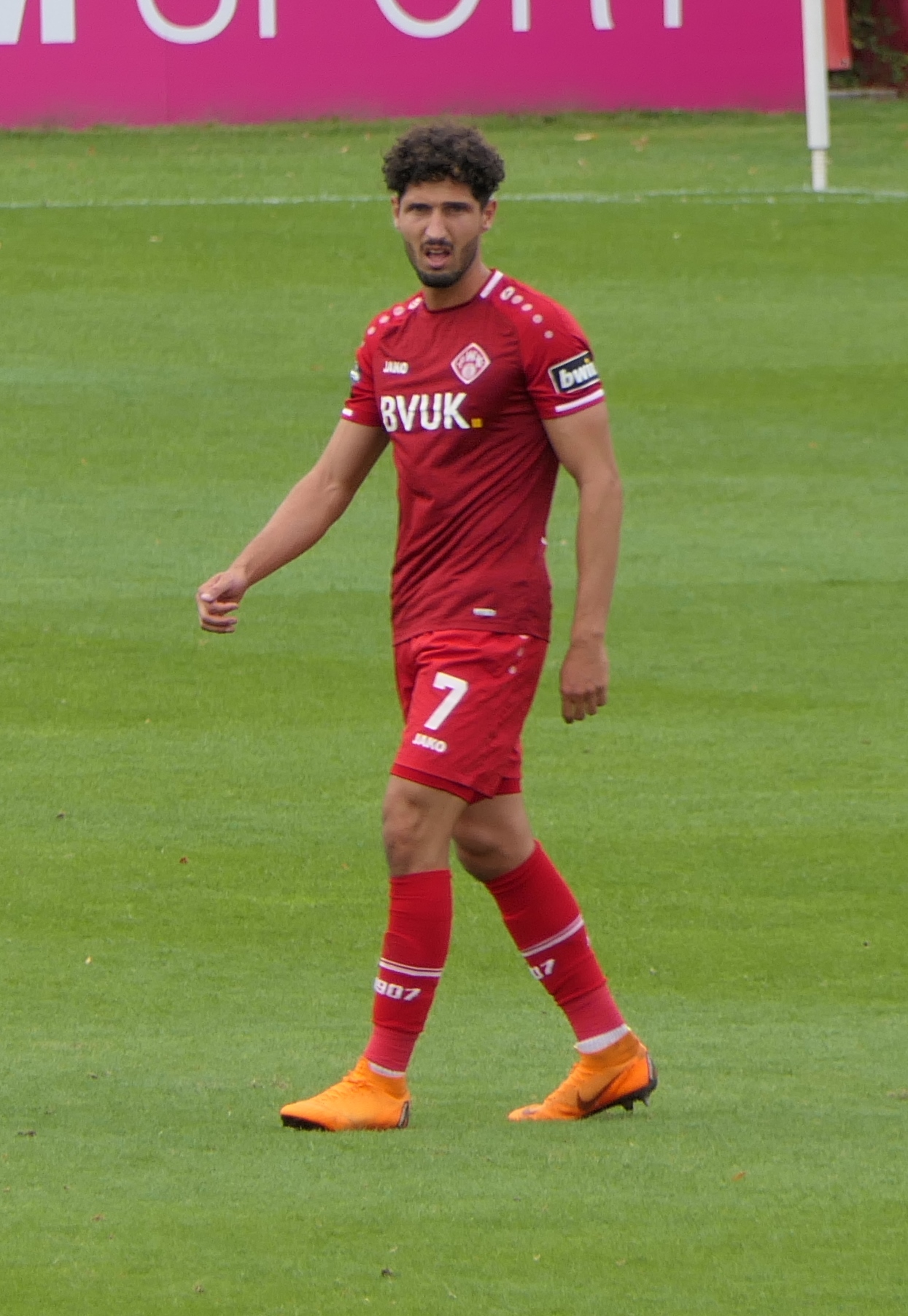
- Kaufmann with Würzburger Kickers in 2018

Personal information
- Full name: Fabio Herbert Kaufmann
- Date of birth: 8 September 1992 (age 34)
- Place of birth: Aalen, Germany
- Height: 1.81 m (5 ft 11 in)
- Position: Right winger

Team information
- Current team: BG Pathum United
- Number: 37

Youth career
- 2001–2009: VfR Aalen
- 2009–2011: SSV Ulm

Senior career*
Years	Team	Apps	(Gls)
2011–2013	SSV Ulm	68	(13)
2013–2015	VfR Aalen	27	(1)
2015–2016	Energie Cottbus	35	(1)
2016–2017	Erzgebirge Aue	19	(1)
2018–2020	Würzburger Kickers	85	(18)
2020–2021	Eintracht Braunschweig	32	(5)
2021–2022	Karlsruher SC	23	(0)
2022–2026	Eintracht Braunschweig	113	(10)
2026–	BG Pathum United	0	(0)
- * Club domestic league appearances and goals as of 18 May 2026

Fabio Herbert Kaufmann (born 8 September 1992) is a German professional footballer who plays as a right winger for Thai League 1 club BG Pathum United.

== Career ==
After impressive performances for SSV Ulm in fourth-tier Regionalliga Südwest, Kaufmann was signed by his former youth and then 2. Bundesliga club VfR Aalen in summer 2013.

In the 2019–20 season Kaufmann helped Würzburger Kickers promote to the 2. Bundesliga contributing 14 goals and 12 assists.

In July 2020, Kaufmann left Würzburger Kickers on a free transfer joining Eintracht Braunschweig, who had also achieved promotion to the 2. Bundesliga the previous season. He agreed a two-year contract with Eintracht Braunschweig.

On 23 June 2022, Kaufmann returned to Eintracht Braunschweig after one year away.

== Personal life ==
Kaufmann is of Italian descent through his maternal grandparents, who are from Naples. In 1998, Kaufmann sang "Un cuoricino in più" (Ein Schwesterlein in German) at Zecchino d'Oro.
