= Jannis Nikolaou =

German footballer

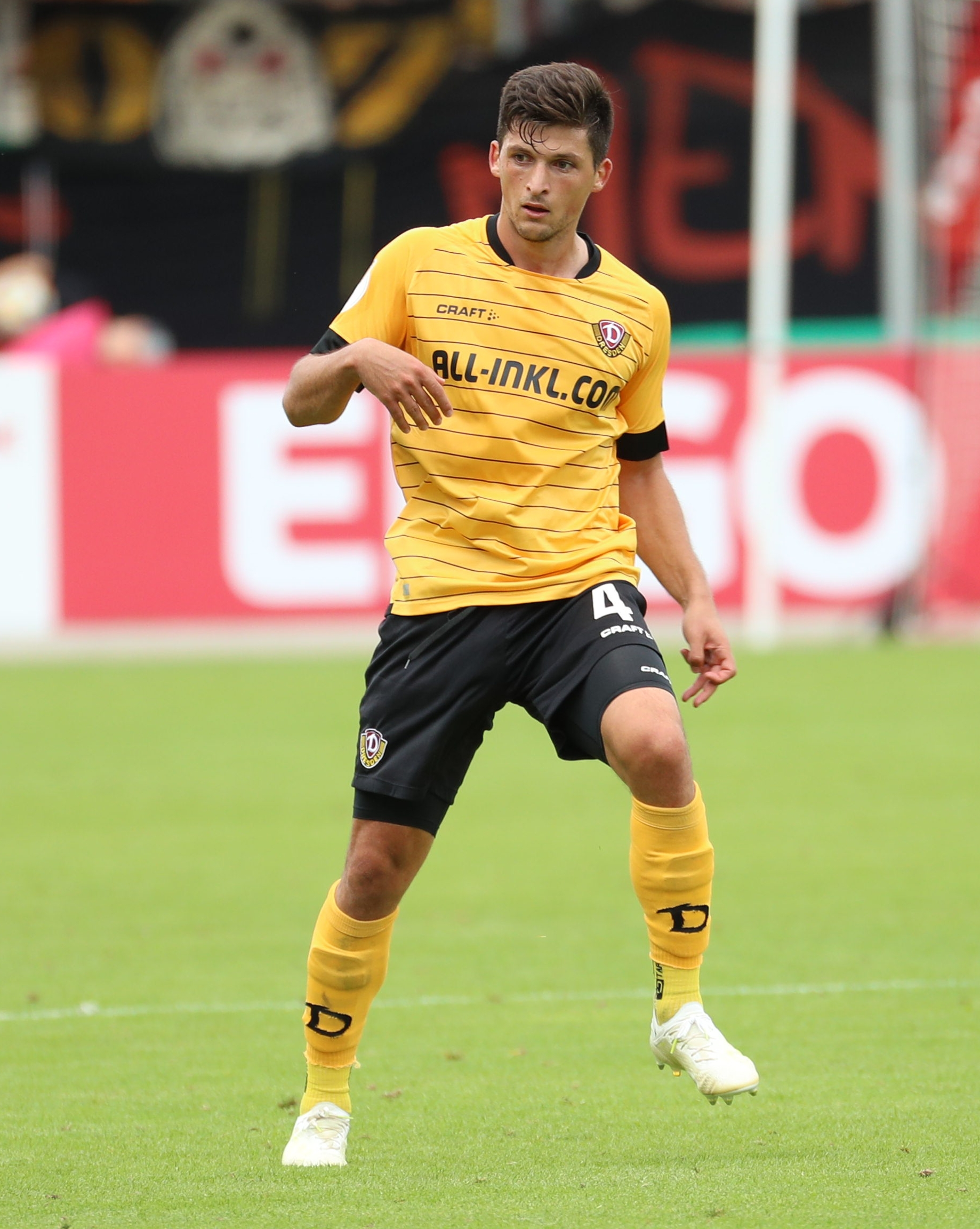
- Nikolaou in 2019

Personal information
- Date of birth: 31 July 1993 (age 33)
- Place of birth: Bonn, Germany
- Height: 1.87 m (6 ft 2 in)
- Position: Defender

Youth career
- TB Witterschlick
- VfL Rheinbach
- –2006: Bonner SC
- 2006–2012: 1. FC Köln

Senior career*
Years	Team	Apps	(Gls)
2012–2015	1. FC Köln II	92	(6)
2015–2017	Rot-Weiß Erfurt	63	(4)
2017–2018	Würzburger Kickers	36	(6)
2018–2020	Dynamo Dresden	58	(4)
2020–2025	Eintracht Braunschweig	138	(6)
- * Club domestic league appearances and goals as of 20 May 2025

Jannis Nikolaou (born 31 July 1993) is a German professional footballer who plays as a defender.

== Career ==
On 20 June 2025, it was announced that Nikolaou's contract with Eintracht Braunschweig would not be extended beyond the end of the season.

== Personal life ==
Nikolaou was born in Germany to a Greek father and German mother.
