= Jan-Hendrik Marx =

German footballer

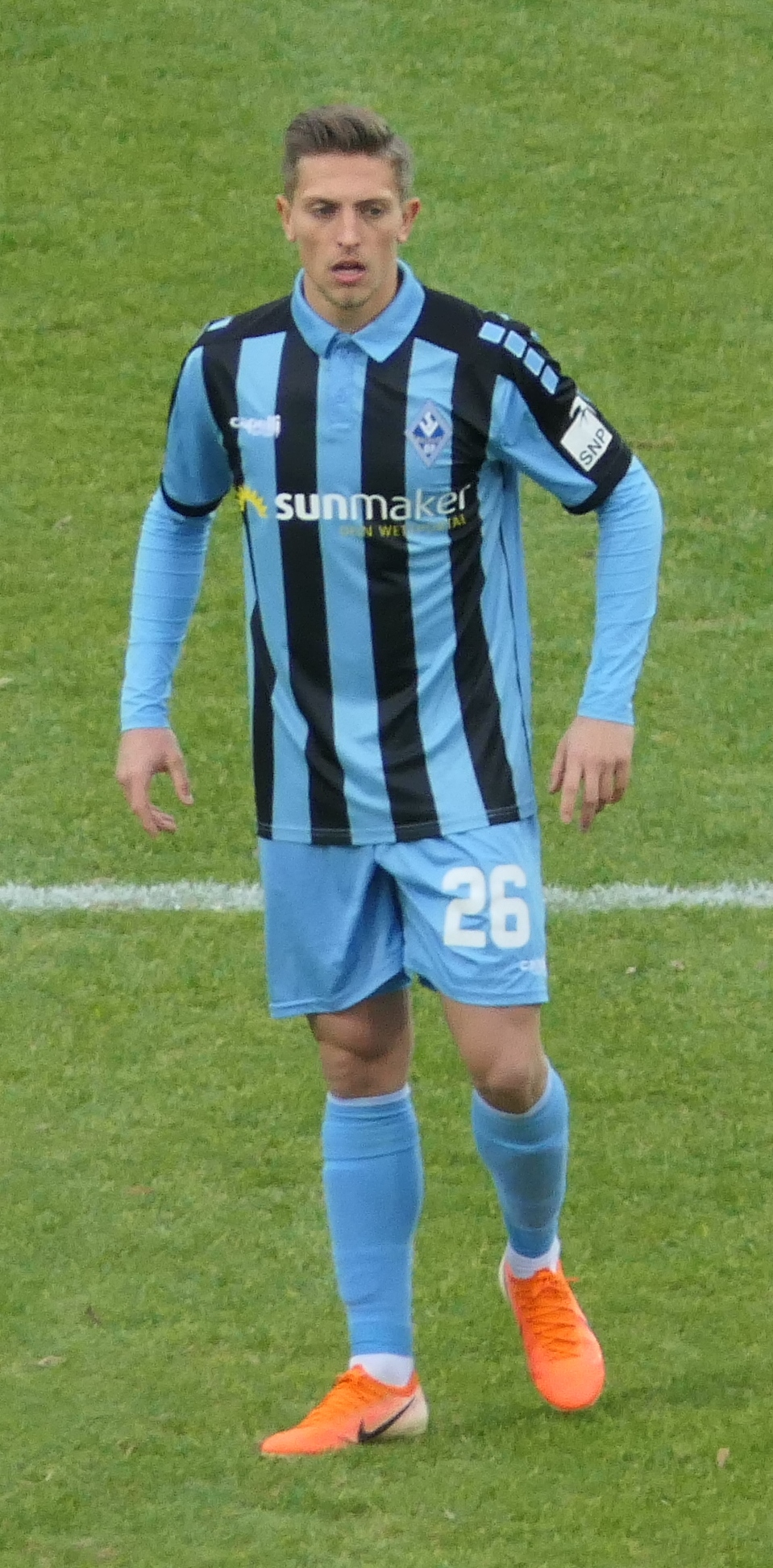
- Marx in 2019

Personal information
- Date of birth: 26 April 1995 (age 31)
- Place of birth: Bad Soden, Germany
- Height: 1.73 m (5 ft 8 in)
- Position: Right-back

Team information
- Current team: Kickers Offenbach
- Number: 32

Youth career
- SV Hofheim
- –2012: Eintracht Frankfurt
- 2012–2014: Kickers Offenbach

Senior career*
Years	Team	Apps	(Gls)
2014–2019	Kickers Offenbach	87	(3)
2015–2016	Kickers Offenbach II	20	(2)
2019–2021	Waldhof Mannheim	56	(0)
2021–2022	FC Ingolstadt	3	(0)
2022–2024	Eintracht Braunschweig	48	(3)
2024–2026	Dynamo Dresden	11	(0)
2025–2026	Dynamo Dresden II	2	(3)
2026–	Kickers Offenbach	7	(0)
- * Club domestic league appearances and goals as of 24 September 2026

Jan-Hendrik Marx (born 26 April 1995) is a German professional footballer who plays as a right-back for Regionalliga Südwest club Kickers Offenbach.

== Career ==
Marx made his professional debut for Waldhof Mannheim in the 3. Liga on 21 July 2019, starting in the away match against Chemnitzer FC which finished as a 1–1 draw.

On 30 December 2021, Marx agreed to join Eintracht Braunschweig until 30 June 2023.

On 3 June 2024, Marx signed with Dynamo Dresden.

On 29 June 2026, Marx returned to his first club Kickers Offenbach.
