= 2024–25 1. FC Heidenheim season =

1. FC Heidenheim
2024–25 season
- President: Holger Sanwald
- Head coach: Frank Schmidt
- Stadium: Voith-Arena
- Bundesliga: 16th (play-off winners)
- DFB-Pokal: Second round
- UEFA Conference League: Knockout phase play-offs
- Top goalscorer: League: Marvin Pieringer (7); All: Mathias Honsak (9)
Home colours	Away colours	Third colours

The 2024–25 season was the 18th season in the history of 1. FC Heidenheim as a legally independent club, and the club's second consecutive season in the Bundesliga. In addition to the domestic league, the club participated in the DFB-Pokal and the UEFA Conference League, their first appearance in a major European competition.

== Players ==
=== First-team squad ===
As of 21 January 2025

Note: Flags indicate national team as defined under FIFA eligibility rules; some limited exceptions apply. Players may hold more than one non-FIFA nationality.

No.	Pos.	Nation	Player
1	GK	GER	Kevin Müller (vice-captain)
2	DF	GER	Marnon Busch (4th captain)
3	MF	GER	Jan Schöppner
4	DF	GER	Tim Siersleben
5	MF	GER	Benedikt Gimber
6	DF	GER	Patrick Mainka (captain)
8	FW	BRA	Léo Scienza
9	FW	GER	Stefan Schimmer
10	MF	GER	Paul Wanner (on loan from Bayern Munich)
12	FW	GEO	Budu Zivzivadze
13	DF	GER	Frans Krätzig (on loan from Bayern Munich)
14	FW	GER	Maximilian Breunig
16	MF	GER	Julian Niehues
17	MF	AUT	Mathias Honsak

No.	Pos.	Nation	Player
18	FW	GER	Marvin Pieringer
19	DF	GER	Jonas Föhrenbach
20	MF	GER	Luca Kerber
21	MF	GER	Adrian Beck
22	GK	GER	Vitus Eicher
23	DF	GER	Omar Haktab Traoré
25	FW	GER	Christopher Negele
27	DF	GER	Thomas Keller
30	MF	GER	Norman Theuerkauf (3rd captain)
31	FW	GER	Sirlord Conteh
34	GK	AUT	Paul Tschernuth
36	MF	GER	Luka Janes
39	MF	GER	Niklas Dorsch

=== Out on loan ===
Note: Flags indicate national team as defined under FIFA eligibility rules; some limited exceptions apply. Players may hold more than one non-FIFA nationality.

No.	Pos.	Nation	Player
—	FW	DEN	Mikkel Kaufmann (at Karlsruher SC until 30 June 2025)

== Transfers ==
=== In ===
Pos.	Player	Transferred from	Fee	Date	Source
MF	(Germany) Julian Niehues	(Germany) 1. FC Kaiserslautern	Free	1 July 2024	
MF	(Germany) Paul Wanner	(Germany) Bayern Munich	Loan	1 July 2024	
FW	(Germany) Maximilian Breunig	(Germany) SC Freiburg	Free	1 July 2024	
MF	(Germany) Sirlord Conteh	(Germany) SC Paderborn	€730,000	1 July 2024	
MF	(Germany) Frans Krätzig	(Germany) Bayern Munich	Loan	3 January 2025	
FW	(Georgia (country)) Budu Zivzivadze	(Germany) Karlsruher SC	Undisclosed	3 January 2025	

=== Out ===
Pos.	Player	Transferred to	Fee	Date	Source
MF	(Germany) Eren Dinkçi	(Germany) Werder Bremen	Loan return	30 June 2024	
FW	(Germany) Tim Kleindienst	(Germany) 1. FC Heidenheim	€7,000,000	1 July 2024	
FW	(Germany) Kevin Sessa	(Germany) Hertha BSC	End of contract	1 July 2024	
FW	(Germany) Elidon Qenaj		End of contract	1 July 2024	
FW	(Austria) Nikola Dovedan	(Turkey) Fatih Karagümrük	End of contract	1 July 2024	
MF	(Germany) Jan-Niklas Beste	(Portugal) Benfica	€10,000,000	11 July 2024	

== Friendlies ==
=== Pre-season ===
13 July 2024 Friendly	Schwäbisch Hall	1–3	1. FC Heidenheim	Schwäbisch Hall
15:30 CEST (UTC+2)	Gökdemir 90'	Report	Honsak 3'; Breunig 47'; Janeš 62'	Stadium: Optima Sportpark; Attendance: 2,000

26 July 2024 Friendly	1. FC Heidenheim	4–0	Normannia Gmünd

10 August 2024 Friendly	1. FC Heidenheim	2–1	Espanyol	Heidenheim
15:30 CEST (UTC+2)				Stadium: Voith-Arena

== Competitions ==
=== Overall record ===
Competition	First match	Last match	Starting round	Final position	Record							
Competition	First match	Last match	Starting round	Final position	Pld	W	D	L	GF	GA	GD	Win %
Bundesliga	25 August 2024	17 May 2025	Matchday 1	16th	34	8	5	21	37	64	−27	23.53
Bundesliga relegation play-offs	22 May 2025	26 May 2025	First leg	Winners	2	1	1	0	4	3	+1	50.00
DFB-Pokal	17 August 2024	30 October 2024	First round	Second round	2	1	0	1	5	2	+3	50.00
UEFA Conference League	22 August 2024	20 February 2025	Play-off round	Knockout phase play-offs	10	6	1	3	15	14	+1	60.00
Total					48	16	7	25	61	83	−22	33.33

Source: Soccerway

=== Bundesliga ===
==== League table ====
Pos	Team	Pld	W	D	L	GF	GA	GD	Pts	Qualification or relegation
14	FC St. Pauli	34	8	8	18	28	41	−13	32	
15	TSG Hoffenheim	34	7	11	16	46	68	−22	32	
16	1. FC Heidenheim (O)	34	8	5	21	37	64	−27	29	Qualification for the relegation play-offs
17	Holstein Kiel (R)	34	6	7	21	49	80	−31	25	Relegation to 2. Bundesliga
18	VfL Bochum (R)	34	6	7	21	33	67	−34	25	Relegation to 2. Bundesliga

Source: Bundesliga
Rules for classification: 1) Points; 2) Goal difference; 3) Goals scored; 4) Head-to-head results; 5) Head-to-head away goals scored; 6) Away goals scored; 7) Play-off.
(Rules 4–6 only apply after home and away matches have been played between the tied teams.)
(O) Play-off winners; (R) Relegated

==== Results summary ====
Overall								Home						Away					
Pld	W	D	L	GF	GA	GD	Pts	W	D	L	GF	GA	GD	W	D	L	GF	GA	GD
34	8	5	21	37	64	−27	29	3	2	12	13	33	−20	5	3	9	24	31	−7

Source: DFB

==== Results by round ====
Round	1	2	3	4	5	6	7	8	9	10	11	12	13	14	15	16	17	18	19	20	21	22	23	24	25	26	27	28	29	30	31	32	33	34
Ground	A	H	A	H	A	H	A	H	A	H	A	H	A	H	A	H	A	H	A	H	A	H	A	H	A	H	A	H	A	H	A	H	A	H
Result	W	W	L	L	W	L	L	D	L	L	L	L	L	L	L	W	D	L	L	L	L	L	D	L	D	W	W	L	L	L	W	D	W	L
Position	2	1	4	9	6	9	10	10	12	14	15	16	16	16	16	16	15	16	16	16	16	16	16	18	18	17	16	16	16	16	16	16	16	16
Points	3	6	6	6	9	9	9	10	10	10	10	10	10	10	10	13	14	14	14	14	14	14	15	15	16	19	22	22	22	22	25	26	29	29

Source: DFB
A = Away; H = Home; W = Win; D = Draw; L = Loss

==== Matches ====
The league schedule was released on 4 July 2024.

25 August 2024 1	FC St. Pauli	0–2	1. FC Heidenheim	Hamburg
17:30 CEST (UTC+2)	Irvine (yellow card) 18'; Wagner (yellow card) 28'	Report	Maloney (yellow card) 22'; Wanner 66'; Traoré (yellow card) 74'; Gimber (yellow card) 78'; Schöppner 90+2'	Stadium: Millerntor-Stadion; Attendance: 29,157; Referee: Sven Jablonski

1 September 2024 2	1. FC Heidenheim	4–0	FC Augsburg	Heidenheim
15:30 CEST (UTC+2)	Wanner 9' (pen.); Scienza 30'; Beck 69'; Breunig 73'; Honsak (yellow card) 90+5'	Report	Gouweleeuw (yellow card) 45+7'; Schlotterbeck (yellow card) 67'; Rexhbeçaj (yellow card) 69'; Vargas (yellow card) 90+5'	Stadium: Voith-Arena; Attendance: 15,000; Referee: Martin Petersen

13 September 2024 3	Borussia Dortmund	4–2	1. FC Heidenheim	Dortmund
20:30 CEST (UTC+2)	Malen 11'; Adeyemi 17', 41'; Gittens (yellow card) 82'; Couto (yellow card) 86'; Can 90+3' (pen.)	Report	Pieringer 39'; Wanner (yellow card) 63'; Breunig 74' (pen.); Kaufmann (yellow card) 83'	Stadium: Signal Iduna Park; Attendance: 81,365; Referee: Robert Schröder

21 September 2024 4	1. FC Heidenheim	0–3	SC Freiburg	Heidenheim
15:30 CEST (UTC+2)	Pieringer (yellow card) 74'	Report	Dōan 54'; Adamu (yellow card) 57'; Grifo 59', 65'	Stadium: Voith-Arena; Attendance: 15,000; Referee: Benjamin Brand

28 September 2024 5	Mainz 05	0–2	1. FC Heidenheim	Mainz
15:30 CEST (UTC+2)	Hanche-Olsen (yellow card) 6' (yellow-red card) 28'; Jenz (yellow card) 49'; Kohr (yellow card) 61'	Report	Pieringer 15', (yellow card) 77'; Traoré (yellow card) 48'; Mainka (yellow card) 49'; Gimber (yellow card) 56'; Dorsch (red card) 80'; Schöppner 86'	Stadium: Mewa Arena; Attendance: 31,500; Referee: Florian Exner

6 October 2024 6	1. FC Heidenheim	0–1	RB Leipzig	Heidenheim
15:30 CEST (UTC+2)	Föhrenbach (yellow card) 18'; Schimmer (yellow card) 85'	Report	Openda 59'; Simons (yellow card) 72'; Klostermann (yellow card) 90+2'	Stadium: Voith-Arena; Attendance: 15,000; Referee: Sascha Stegemann

19 October 2024 7	Borussia Mönchengladbach	3–2	1. FC Heidenheim	Mönchengladbach
15:30 CEST (UTC+2)	Itakura 22'; Hack (yellow card) 31'; Kleindienst (yellow card) 53', (goal) 62', 75' (pen.); Weigl (yellow card) 88'	Report	Scienza 12'; Schöppner (yellow card) 39'; Gimber (yellow card) 71'; Pieringer 80' (pen.); Kerber (yellow card) 83'	Stadium: Borussia-Park; Attendance: 50,794; Referee: Daniel Siebert

27 October 2024 8	1. FC Heidenheim	0–0	TSG Hoffenheim	Heidenheim
19:30 CET (UTC+1)	Pieringer (yellow card) 32'	Report	Stach (yellow card) 33'; Berisha (yellow card) 90'	Stadium: Voith-Arena; Attendance: 15,000; Referee: Christian Dingert

2 November 2024 9	Holstein Kiel	1–0	1. FC Heidenheim	Kiel
15:30 CET (UTC+1)	Erras 28'; Gigović (yellow card) 35'; Remberg (yellow card) 38'; Porath (yellow card) 59'; Knudsen (yellow card) 84'	Report	Siersleben (yellow card) 17'; Gimber (yellow card) 33'; Mainka (yellow card) 67'; Schöppner (yellow card) 70'; Pieringer (yellow card) 76'	Stadium: Holstein-Stadion; Attendance: 14,405; Referee: Frank Willenborg

10 November 2024 10	1. FC Heidenheim	1–3	VfL Wolfsburg	Heidenheim
19:30 CET (UTC+1)	Dorsch (yellow card) 29'; Föhrenbach (yellow card) 45+1'; Pieringer 64'	Report	Gerhardt 3'; Dardai 42'; Fischer (yellow card) 48'; Wimmer (yellow card) 70'; Zesiger (yellow card) 74'; Grabara (yellow card) 78'; Tomás (yellow card) 84', (goal) 90'; Behrens (yellow card) 90+1'	Stadium: Voith-Arena; Attendance: 15,000; Referee: Harm Osmers

23 November 2024 11	Bayer Leverkusen	5–2	1. FC Heidenheim	Leverkusen
15:30 CET (UTC+1)	Palacios 30'; Schick 32', 52', 71'; Xhaka 82'	Report	Dorsch 10'; Honsak 21'	Stadium: BayArena; Attendance: 29,103; Referee: Bastian Dankert

1 December 2024 12	1. FC Heidenheim	0–4	Eintracht Frankfurt	Heidenheim
17:30 CET (UTC+1)		Report	Marmoush 22', 58'; Tuta (yellow card) 33'; Chaïbi 49'; Theate (yellow card) 90+3'; Ekitike 90+4'	Stadium: Voith-Arena; Attendance: 15,000; Referee: Florian Exner

7 December 2024 13	Bayern Munich	4–2	1. FC Heidenheim	Munich
15:30 CET (UTC+1)	Upamecano 18'; Musiala 56', 90+1'; Goretzka 84'; Peretz (yellow card) 87'	Report	Hosnak 50'; Dorsch 85'	Stadium: Allianz Arena; Attendance: 75,000; Referee: Sören Storks

15 December 2024 14	1. FC Heidenheim	1–3	VfB Stuttgart	Heidenheim
15:30 CET (UTC+1)	Gimber (yellow card) 26'; Wanner 41'; Dorsch (yellow card) 75'; Kaufmann (yellow card) 84'; Schöppner (yellow card) 88'	Report	Demirović (yellow card) 10'; Mittelstadt 20'; Woltemade (yellow card) 26', (goal) 85' (pen.); Millot 45+2'; Rouault (yellow card) 90'	Stadium: Voith-Arena; Attendance: 15,000; Referee: Christian Dingert

22 December 2024 15	VfL Bochum	2–0	1. FC Heidenheim	Bochum
15:30 CET (UTC+1)	Broschinski 6'; Bernardo (yellow card) 22'; Bero 38', (yellow card) 54'	Report	Schöppner (yellow card) 30'; Wanner (yellow card) 35'; Pieringer (yellow card) 46'; Keller (yellow card) 50'; Kerber (yellow card) 73'; Siersleben (yellow card) 75'; Conteh (yellow card) 82'	Stadium: Vonovia Ruhrstadion; Attendance: 24,328; Referee: Sven Jablonski

11 January 2025 16	1. FC Heidenheim	2–0	Union Berlin	Heidenheim
15:30 CET (UTC+1)	Krätzig 17'; Beck 83'	Report	Rothe (red card) 37'; Trimmel (yellow card) 76'	Stadium: Voith-Arena; Attendance: 15,000; Referee: Robert Hartmann

15 January 2025 17	Werder Bremen	3–3	1. FC Heidenheim	Bremen
20:30 CET (UTC+1)	Grüll 1', 79'; Ducksch 56', (yellow card) 67'; Lynen (yellow card) 64'; Stage (yellow card) 90+4'; Alvero (yellow card) 90+4'; Stark (yellow card) 90+4'	Report	Kerber (yellow card) 23', (goal) 61'; Schöppner 30'; Traoré (yellow card) 64'; Mainka (yellow card) 71'; Scienza 90+5'	Stadium: Weserstadion; Attendance: 39,350; Referee: Matthias Jöllenbeck

18 January 2025 18	1. FC Heidenheim	0–2	FC St. Pauli	Heidenheim
15:30 CET (UTC+1)	Kerber (yellow card) 84'	Report	Eggestein 25' (pen.); Sands (yellow card) 38'; Smith (yellow card) 70'; Guilavogui 90+2'	Stadium: Voith-Arena; Attendance: 15,000; Referee: Bastian Dankert

25 January 2025 19	FC Augsburg	2–1	1. FC Heidenheim	Augsburg
15:30 CET (UTC+1)	Matsima 45+1'; Gumny (yellow card) 88'; Schlotterbeck 90+2'	Report	Mainka 76'	Stadium: Augsburg Arena; Attendance: 30,660; Referee: Florian Badstübner

1 February 2025 20	1. FC Heidenheim	1–2	Borussia Dortmund	Heidenheim
15:30 CET (UTC+1)	Föhrenbach (yellow card) 38'; Honsak 64'	Report	Duranville (yellow card) 14'; Guirassy 33', (yellow card) 90+3'; Beier 63'; Reyna (yellow card) 88'; Kobel (yellow card) 90+1'	Stadium: Voith-Arena; Attendance: 15,000; Referee: Frank Willenborg

8 February 2025 21	SC Freiburg	1–0	1. FC Heidenheim	Freiburg
15:30 CET (UTC+1)	Grifo 30', (yellow card) 76'; Eggestein (yellow card) 45+4'; Höler (yellow card) 55'	Report	Gimber (yellow card) 18'	Stadium: Europa-Park Stadion; Attendance: 34,000; Referee: Tobias Reichel

16 February 2025 22	1. FC Heidenheim	0–2	Mainz 05	Heidenheim
19:30 CET (UTC+1)	Pieringer (yellow card) 62'	Report	Burkardt 28'; Weiper 49'; Kohr (yellow card) 65'; Caci (yellow card) 71'; Amiri (yellow card) 73'	Stadium: Voith-Arena; Attendance: 15,000; Referee: Felix Brych

23 February 2025 23	RB Leipzig	2–2	1. FC Heidenheim	Leipzig
15:30 CET (UTC+1)	Baumgartner (yellow card) 6'; Orbán (yellow card) 12'; Openda 45+2'; Šeško 64' (pen.); Simons (yellow card) 90+8'	Report	Honsak 6'; Pieringer 13' (pen.); Gimber (yellow card) 15'; Schöppner (yellow card) 67'; Keller (yellow card) 77'	Stadium: Red Bull Arena; Attendance: 44,000; Referee: Martin Petersen

1 March 2025 24	1. FC Heidenheim	0–3	Borussia Mönchengladbach	Heidenheim
15:30 CET (UTC+1)	Gimber (yellow card) 49'; Mainka (yellow card) 58'	Report	Scally (yellow card) 6'; Hack 8', 59'; Ngoumou 18'; Itakura (yellow card) 49'; Pléa (yellow card) 61'	Stadium: Voith-Arena; Attendance: 15,000; Referee: Sören Storks

9 March 2025 25	TSG Hoffenheim	1–1	1. FC Heidenheim	Sinsheim
17:30 CET (UTC+1)	Tabaković 34'; Chaves (yellow card) 90+3'; Becker (yellow card) 90+7'	Report	Siersleben (yellow card) 9'; Pieringer (yellow card) 13'; Zivzivadze 65'; Traoré (yellow card) 90+5'	Stadium: Rhein-Neckar-Arena; Attendance: 20,814; Referee: Daniel Schlager

16 March 2025 26	1. FC Heidenheim	3–1	Holstein Kiel	Heidenheim
17:30 CET (UTC+1)	Pieringer 33'; Zivzivadze 47'; Traoré (yellow card) 57'; Conteh 90+3'	Report	Komenda (yellow card) 54'; Harres (yellow card) 78', (goal) 87'; Arp (yellow card) 85'	Stadium: Voith-Arena; Attendance: 15,000; Referee: Harm Osmers

29 March 2025 27	VfL Wolfsburg	0–1	1. FC Heidenheim	Wolfsburg
15:30 CET (UTC+1)	Gerhardt (yellow card) 51'; Nmecha (yellow card) 90+3'	Report	Pieringer 16' (pen.); Siersleben (yellow card) 32'; Beck (yellow card) 43'; Schöppner (yellow card) 51'; Dorsch (yellow card) 73'	Stadium: Volkswagen Arena; Attendance: 21,545; Referee: Bastian Dankert

5 April 2025 28	1. FC Heidenheim	0–1	Bayer Leverkusen	Heidenheim
15:30 CEST (UTC+2)	Schöppner (yellow card) 42'	Report	Buendía 90+1'	Stadium: Voith-Arena; Attendance: 15,000; Referee: Tobias Stieler

13 April 2025 29	Eintracht Frankfurt	3–0	1. FC Heidenheim	Frankfurt
15:30 CEST (UTC+2)	Bahoya 10'; Ekitike (yellow card) 30', (goal) 71'; Koch 42'	Report	Dorsch (yellow card) 30'	Stadium: Deutsche Bank Park; Attendance: 57,500; Referee: Timo Gerach

19 April 2025 30	1. FC Heidenheim	0–4	Bayern Munich	Heidenheim
15:30 CEST (UTC+2)	Gimber (yellow card) 35'; Dorsch (yellow card) 41'; Schöppner (yellow card) 43'	Report	Kane 12'; Laimer 19'; Coman 36'; Kimmich 56'; Guerreiro (yellow card) 80'	Stadium: Voith-Arena; Attendance: 15,000; Referee: Frank Willenborg

25 April 2025 31	VfB Stuttgart	0–1	1. FC Heidenheim	Stuttgart
20:30 CEST (UTC+2)				Stadium: MHPArena

2 May 2025 32	1. FC Heidenheim	0–0	VfL Bochum	Heidenheim
20:30 CEST (UTC+2)				Stadium: Voith-Arena

10 May 2025 33	Union Berlin	0–3	1. FC Heidenheim	Berlin
15:30 CEST (UTC+2)				Stadium: Stadion An der Alten Försterei

17 May 2025 34	1. FC Heidenheim	1–4	Werder Bremen	Heidenheim
15:30 CEST (UTC+2)				Stadium: Voith-Arena

==== Relegation play-offs ====
22 May 2025 First leg	1. FC Heidenheim	2–2	SV Elversberg	Voith-Arena, Heidenheim
20:30	Siersleben 62'; Honsak 64'	Report	Petkov 18'; Asllani 42'	Attendance: 15,000; Referee: Sven Jablonski

26 May 2025 Second leg	SV Elversberg	1–2 (3–4 agg.)	1. FC Heidenheim	Waldstadion an der Kaiserlinde, Spiesen-Elversberg
20:30	Fellhauer 31'	Report	Honsak 9'; Scienza 90+5'	Attendance: 9,105; Referee: Sascha Stegemann

=== DFB-Pokal ===
17 August 2024 First round	FC 08 Villingen	0–4	1. FC Heidenheim	Villingen-Schwenningen
15:30 CEST (UTC+2)	Liserra (yellow card) 88'	Report	Breunig 43', 48', 54'; Wanner 52'	Stadium: MS-Technologie-Arena; Attendance: 6,800; Referee: Fabienne Michel

30 October 2024 Second round	Hertha BSC	2–1	1. FC Heidenheim	Berlin
18:00 CET (UTC+1)	Scherhant 16'; Maza (yellow card) 28'; Zeefuik (yellow card) 33'; Niederlechner (yellow card) 36'; Cuisance 74', (yellow card) 80'; Winkler (yellow card) 90+3'	Report	Kaufmann (yellow card) 33'; Schimmer 89'	Stadium: Olympiastadion; Attendance: 44,135; Referee: Robert Kampka

=== UEFA Conference League ===
==== Play-off round ====
The draw for the play-off round was held on 5 August 2024.

22 August 2024 First leg	BK Häcken (Sweden)	1–2	(Germany) 1. FC Heidenheim	Gothenburg, Sweden
19:00 CEST (UTC+2)	Rygaard 36'; Layouni (yellow card) 45+1'	Report	Conteh 31', (yellow card) 35'; Kerber (yellow card) 57'; Scienza 65'; Maloney (yellow card) 90+2'	Stadium: Bravida Arena; Attendance: 4,135; Referee: Viktor Kopiievskyi (Ukraine)

29 August 2024 Second leg	1. FC Heidenheim (Germany)	3–2 (5–3 agg.)	(Sweden) BK Häcken	Heidenheim
20:30 CEST (UTC+2)	Pieringer (yellow card) 21', (goal) 30'; Kaufmann (yellow card) 72'; Scienza (yellow card) 75'; Wanner 84', (yellow card) 90'; Honsak 90+2'	Report	Youssef (yellow card) 32'; Lindberg (yellow card) 50'; Inoussa 59', (yellow card) 75'; Romeo (yellow card) 62'; Rygaard (yellow card) 73'; Agbonifo 79'	Stadium: Voith-Arena; Attendance: 11,600; Referee: Giorgi Kruashvili (Georgia)

==== League phase ====
The draw for the league phase was held on 30 August 2024.

Pos	Team	Pld	W	D	L	GF	GA	GD	Pts	Qualification
14	(Football Association of Slovenia) Olimpija Ljubljana	6	3	1	2	7	6	+1	10	Advance to knockout phase play-offs (seeded)
15	(Royal Spanish Football Federation) Real Betis	6	3	1	2	6	5	+1	10	Advance to knockout phase play-offs (seeded)
16	(German Football Association) 1. FC Heidenheim	6	3	1	2	7	7	0	10	Advance to knockout phase play-offs (seeded)
17	(Royal Belgian Football Association) Gent	6	3	0	3	8	8	0	9	Advance to knockout phase play-offs (unseeded)
18	(Danish Football Association) Copenhagen	6	2	2	2	8	9	−1	8	Advance to knockout phase play-offs (unseeded)

Source: UEFA
Rules for classification: League phase tiebreakers

Round	1	2	3	4	5	6
Ground	H	A	A	H	A	H
Result	W	W	W	L	L	D
Position	13	9	6	9	15	16
Points	3	6	9	9	9	10

Source: UEFA
A = Away; H = Home; W = Win; D = Draw; L = Loss

3 October 2024 1	1. FC Heidenheim (Germany)	2–1	(Slovenia) Olimpija Ljubljana	Heidenheim
18:45 CEST (UTC+2)	Beck 6'; Wanner (penalty missed) 83', 83', (yellow card) 84'; Scienza (yellow card) 88'; Kerber (yellow card) 90+5'	Report	Thalisson (yellow card) 37'; Agba (yellow card) 65'; Blanco 77'	Stadium: Voith-Arena; Attendance: 12,887; Referee: Enea Jorgji (Albania)

24 October 2024 2	Pafos (Cyprus)	0–1	(Germany) 1. FC Heidenheim	Limassol, Cyprus
22:00 EEST (UTC+3)	Luckassen (yellow card) 55'	Report	Mainka 25'; Dorsch (yellow card) 46'	Stadium: Alphamega Stadium; Attendance: 2,511; Referee: Jasper Vergoote (Belgium)
Note: The match was played at the Alphamega Stadium in Limassol, instead of Pafos' regular stadium, the Stelios Kyriakides Stadium in Paphos, which did not meet UEFA requirements.

7 November 2024 3	Heart of Midlothian (Scotland)	0–2	(Germany) 1. FC Heidenheim	Edinburgh, Scotland
20:00 GMT (UTC+0)		Report	Maloney (yellow card) 42'; Conteh 57'; Schöppner 89'	Stadium: Tynecastle Park; Attendance: 17,692; Referee: Kristoffer Hagenes (Norway)

28 November 2024 4	1. FC Heidenheim (Germany)	0–2	(England) Chelsea	Heidenheim
18:45 CET (UTC+1)	Traoré (yellow card) 42'; Schöppner (yellow card) 85'	Report	Badiashile (yellow card) 1'; Casadei (yellow card) 45' (yellow-red card) 90+6'; Nkunku 51'; Jörgensen (yellow card) 82'; Veiga (yellow card) 85'; Mudryk 86'	Stadium: Voith-Arena; Attendance: 15,000; Referee: Serdar Gözübüyük (Netherlands)

12 December 2024 5	İstanbul Başakşehir (Turkey)	3–1	(Germany) 1. FC Heidenheim	Istanbul, Turkey
20:45 TRT (UTC+3)	Türüç 6'; Crespo 18'; Piątek 68', (yellow card) 73'	Report	Maloney (yellow card) 45'; Honsak 61'; Schöppner (yellow card) 73'; Eicher (yellow card) 90+2'	Stadium: Başakşehir Fatih Terim Stadium; Attendance: 4,769; Referee: Marco Guida (Italy)

19 December 2024 6	1. FC Heidenheim (Germany)	1–1	(Switzerland) St. Gallen	Heidenheim
21:00 CET (UTC+1)	Theuerkauf 30'; Kaufmann (yellow card) 39'; Wanner (yellow card) 66'	Report	Quintillà (yellow card) 66'; Witzig (yellow card) 71'; Stanić 77', (yellow card) 81'	Stadium: Voith-Arena; Attendance: 12,800; Referee: Javier Alberola Rojas (Spain)

==== Knockout phase ====
===== Knockout phase play-offs =====
The draw for the knockout phase play-offs was held on 20 December 2024.

13 February 2025 First leg	Copenhagen (Denmark)	1–2	(Germany) 1. FC Heidenheim	Copenhagen, Denmark
21:00 CET (UTC+1)	Larsson 45+1', (yellow card) 50'; Huescas (yellow card) 58'; Gocholeishvili (yellow card) 83'	Report	Keller 59'; Mainka (yellow card) 65'; Siersleben 85'	Stadium: Parken Stadium; Attendance: 22,789; Referee: Alexandros Tsakalidis (Greece)

20 February 2025 Second leg	1. FC Heidenheim (Germany)	1–3 (a.e.t.) (3–4 agg.)	(Denmark) Copenhagen	Heidenheim
18:45 CET (UTC+1)	Föhrenbach (yellow card) 52'; Scienza 74'; Beck (yellow card) 90+6'; Schöppner (yellow card) 110'	Report	Chiakha 37'; Diks 53' (pen.); Meling (yellow card) 69'; Pereira (yellow card) 73'; Huescas 114'; Ramaj (yellow card) 120+3'	Stadium: Voith-Arena; Attendance: 12,336; Referee: Nikola Dabanović (Montenegro)
