= 2023–24 1. FC Heidenheim season =

1. FC Heidenheim
2023–24 season
- President: Holger Sanwald
- Head coach: Frank Schmidt
- Stadium: Voith-Arena
- Bundesliga: 8th
- DFB-Pokal: Second round
- Top goalscorer: League: Tim Kleindienst (12); All: Tim Kleindienst (14)
- Average home league attendance: 15,000
Home colours	Away colours	Third colours

The 2023–24 season was 1. FC Heidenheim's 17th season as a legally independent club and first ever season in the Bundesliga. They also competed in the DFB-Pokal.

== Players ==
=== First-team squad ===
As of 1 September 2023

Note: Flags indicate national team as defined under FIFA eligibility rules; some limited exceptions apply. Players may hold more than one non-FIFA nationality.

No.	Pos.	Nation	Player
1	GK	GER	Kevin Müller (vice-captain)
2	DF	GER	Marnon Busch (4th captain)
3	MF	GER	Jan Schöppner
4	DF	GER	Tim Siersleben
5	MF	GER	Benedikt Gimber
6	DF	GER	Patrick Mainka (captain)
8	FW	GER	Eren Dinkçi (on loan from Werder Bremen)
9	FW	GER	Stefan Schimmer
10	FW	GER	Tim Kleindienst
11	FW	GER	Denis Thomalla
16	MF	GER	Kevin Sessa
17	MF	GER	Florian Pick
18	FW	GER	Marvin Pieringer

No.	Pos.	Nation	Player
19	DF	GER	Jonas Föhrenbach
20	FW	AUT	Nikola Dovedan
21	MF	GER	Adrian Beck
22	GK	GER	Vitus Eicher
23	DF	GER	Omar Haktab Traoré
24	FW	GER	Christian Kühlwetter
27	DF	GER	Thomas Keller
30	MF	GER	Norman Theuerkauf (3rd captain)
33	DF	USA	Lennard Maloney
34	GK	AUT	Paul Tschernuth
36	MF	GER	Luka Janes
37	MF	GER	Jan-Niklas Beste
44	FW	GER	Elidon Qenaj

=== Out on loan ===
Note: Flags indicate national team as defined under FIFA eligibility rules; some limited exceptions apply. Players may hold more than one non-FIFA nationality.

No.	Pos.	Nation	Player
—	MF	GER	Tim Köther (at MSV Duisburg until 30 June 2024)

== Transfers ==
=== In ===
Pos.	Player	Transferred from	Fee	Date	Source
DF	(Germany) Omar Traoré	(Germany) VfL Osnabrück	Free	1 July 2023	
DF	(Germany) Benedikt Gimber	(Germany) Jahn Regensburg	Free	1 July 2023	
FW	(Germany) Eren Dinkçi	(Germany) Werder Bremen	Loan	1 July 2023	
FW	(Austria) Nikola Dovedan	Austria Wien	Free	1 July 2023	
DF	(Germany) Tim Siersleben	(Germany) VfL Wolfsburg	€500,000	1 July 2023	
FW	(Germany) Marvin Pieringer	(Germany) Schalke 04	€1,800,000	3 July 2023	

=== Out ===
Pos.	Player	Transferred to	Fee	Date	Source
DF	(Germany) Marvin Rittmüller	(Germany) Eintracht Braunschweig	Free	1 July 2023	
MF	(Germany) Andreas Geipl	(Germany) Jahn Regensburg	Free	1 July 2023	
MF	(Germany) Dženis Burnić	(Germany) Karlsruher SC	Free	17 July 2023	

== Pre-season and friendlies ==
Win Draw Loss

22 July 2023 Friendly	FC Ingolstadt	1–1	1. FC Heidenheim	Ingolstadt
15:00 CEST (UTC+2)	Keidel 86'	Report	Beste 26'	Stadium: AUDI Sportpark - Platz 4 Attendance: 400; Referee: Assad Nouhoum

26 July 2023 Friendly	1. FC Heidenheim	2–1	Empoli	Kirchbichl, Austria
18:00 CEST (UTC+2)	Pieringer 40'; Pick 43'	Report	Ekong 90'	Stadium: SVK-Arena; Attendance: 500

1 August 2023 Friendly	1. FC Heidenheim	1–1	Pafos	Schwaz
13:00 CEST (UTC+2)	Schimmer 54'	Report	Kvída 78'	Stadium: Silberstadt-Arena; Attendance: 150

5 August 2023 Friendly	1. FC Heidenheim	3–2	Hellas Verona	Heidenheim
15:30 CEST (UTC+2)	Mainka 11'; Pieringer 49'; Kleindienst 59'	Report	Đurić 4', (yellow card) 26'; Ngonge 25'; Ceccherini (yellow card) 58'	Stadium: Voith-Arena; Attendance: 5,414; Referee: Florian Badstubner

7 September 2023 Friendly	1. FC Nürnberg	3–1	1. FC Heidenheim	Nuremberg
14:00 CEST (UTC+2)	Wekesser 45' (pen.); Kania 78'; Geis 82'		Kühlwetter 53'	Stadium: Sportpark Valznerweiher

21 March 2024 Friendly	1. FC Heidenheim	0–1	Karlsruher SC	Heidenheim
13:30 CET (UTC+1)			Ersungur 20'	Stadium: Voith-Arena

== Competitions ==
=== Overall record ===
Competition	First match	Last match	Starting round	Final position	Record							
Competition	First match	Last match	Starting round	Final position	Pld	W	D	L	GF	GA	GD	Win %
Bundesliga	19 August 2023	18 May 2024	Matchday 1	8th	34	10	12	12	50	55	−5	29.41
DFB-Pokal	13 August 2023	31 October 2023	First round	Second round	2	1	0	1	9	3	+6	50.00
Total					36	11	12	13	59	58	+1	30.56

Source: Soccerway

=== Bundesliga ===
==== League table ====
Pos	Team	Pld	W	D	L	GF	GA	GD	Pts	Qualification or relegation
6	Eintracht Frankfurt	34	11	14	9	51	50	+1	47	Qualification for the Europa League league phase (Note: Since the 2023–24 DFB-Pokal winners, Bayer Leverkusen, qualified for the Champions League via league position, the spot reserved for the DFB-Pokal winners (Europa League league phase) was passed to the seventh-placed team, and the Conference League play-off round spot was passed to the eighth-placed team.)
7	TSG Hoffenheim	34	13	7	14	66	66	0	46	Qualification for the Europa League league phase
8	1. FC Heidenheim	34	10	12	12	50	55	−5	42	Qualification for the Conference League play-off round
9	Werder Bremen	34	11	9	14	48	54	−6	42	
10	SC Freiburg	34	11	9	14	45	58	−13	42	

Source: DFB
Rules for classification: 1) Points; 2) Goal difference; 3) Goals scored; 4) Head-to-head results; 5) Head-to-head away goals scored; 6) Away goals scored; 7) Play-off.

==== Results summary ====
Overall								Home						Away					
Pld	W	D	L	GF	GA	GD	Pts	W	D	L	GF	GA	GD	W	D	L	GF	GA	GD
34	10	12	12	50	55	−5	42	7	5	5	30	26	+4	3	7	7	20	29	−9

Source: DFB

==== Results by round ====
Round	1	2	3	4	5	6	7	8	9	10	11	12	13	14	15	16	17	18	19	20	21	22	23	24	25	26	27	28	29	30	31	32	33	34
Ground	A	H	A	H	A	H	A	H	A	H	A	H	A	H	A	H	A	H	A	H	A	H	A	H	A	H	A	H	A	H	A	H	A	H
Result	L	L	D	W	L	W	L	L	L	W	L	D	L	W	W	W	D	D	D	D	W	L	D	L	L	D	D	W	D	L	W	D	D	W
Position	15	16	15	11	13	10	10	11	13	13	13	13	14	13	12	9	9	9	10	10	9	10	10	11	11	11	11	10	10	10	10	10	9	8

Source: DFB
A = Away; H = Home; W = Win; D = Draw; L = Loss

==== Matches ====
The league fixtures were unveiled on 30 June 2023.

19 August 2023 1	VfL Wolfsburg	2–0	1. FC Heidenheim	Wolfsburg
15:30 CEST (UTC+2)	Wind 6', 27'; Gerhardt (yellow card) 36'; Wimmer (yellow card) 45+5'; Vrancx (yellow card) 90+2'	Report		Stadium: Volkswagen Arena; Attendance: 22,620; Referee: Florian Badstübner

26 August 2023 2	1. FC Heidenheim	2–3	1899 Hoffenheim	Heidenheim
15:30 CEST (UTC+2)	Beste (penalty missed) 16', 26'; Dinkçi (yellow card) 38'; Pieringer 58'	Report	Bülter (yellow card) 25'; Akpoguma (yellow card) 40'; Grillitsch (yellow card) 70'; Beier 77'; Kadeřábek 80', (yellow card) 82'; Kramarić 90' (pen.); Weghorst (yellow card) 90+5'	Stadium: Voith-Arena; Attendance: 15,000; Referee: Robert Hartmann

1 September 2023 3	Borussia Dortmund	2–2	1. FC Heidenheim	Dortmund
20:30 CEST (UTC+2)	Brandt 7'; Can 15' (pen.), (yellow card) 90+3'; Bensebaini (yellow card) 61'; Haller (yellow card) 82'	Report	Dinkçi (yellow card) 35', (goal) 61'; Beste (yellow card) 57'; Pieringer (yellow card) 61'; Kleindienst 82' (pen.)	Stadium: Signal Iduna Park; Attendance: 81,365; Referee: Tobias Reichel

17 September 2023 4	1. FC Heidenheim	4–2	Werder Bremen	Heidenheim
15:30 CEST (UTC+2)	Kleindienst 5' (pen.); Dinkçi 44', 68'; Traoré (yellow card) 50'; Beste 76'	Report	Ducksch (penalty missed) 49', 49'; Weiser 64'; Stark (yellow card) 90+5'	Stadium: Voith-Arena; Attendance: 15,000; Referee: Patrick Ittrich

24 September 2023 5	Bayer Leverkusen	4–1	1. FC Heidenheim	Leverkusen
15:30 CEST (UTC+2)	Boniface 9', 74' (pen.); Palacios (yellow card) 31'; Hofmann 63'; Adli 82'	Report	Theuerkauf (yellow card) 37'; Dinkçi 58'	Stadium: BayArena; Attendance: 29,557; Referee: Christian Dingert

30 September 2023 6	1. FC Heidenheim	1–0	Union Berlin	Heidenheim
15:30 CEST (UTC+2)	Pieringer (yellow card) 48'; Beste 59'	Report	Leite (yellow card) 40'; Král (yellow card) 77'	Stadium: Voith-Arena; Attendance: 15,000; Referee: Sascha Stegemann

8 October 2023 7	Eintracht Frankfurt	2–0	1. FC Heidenheim	Frankfurt
19:30 CEST (UTC+2)	Ngankam (yellow card) 11', (penalty missed) 30'; Larsson 39'; Max (yellow card) 65'; Knauff 72'	Report	Beste (yellow card) 23'; Müller (yellow card) 28'; Mainka (yellow card) 46'	Stadium: Deutsche Bank Park; Attendance: 55,800; Referee: Daniel Schlager

22 October 2023 8	1. FC Heidenheim	2–5	FC Augsburg	Heidenheim
17:30 CEST (UTC+2)	Kleindienst 17', (yellow card) 31'; Beste 18'; Beck (yellow card) 51'; Siersleben (yellow card) 90+3'	Report	Tietz 29'; Valentin 41', (yellow card) 45+2'; Demirović 42'; Uduokhai 64'; Bauer (yellow card) 83'; Rexhbecaj 88' (pen.)	Stadium: Voith-Arena; Attendance: 15,000; Referee: Tobias Stieler

28 October 2023 9	Borussia Mönchengladbach	2–1	1. FC Heidenheim	Mönchengladbach
15:30 CEST (UTC+2)	Pléa 4'; Föhrenbach 51' (o.g.)	Report	Dinkçi 38', (yellow card) 45+2'; Pick (yellow card) 61'; Pieringer (yellow card) 77'	Stadium: Borussia-Park; Attendance: 51,541; Referee: Robert Hartmann

5 November 2023 10	1. FC Heidenheim	2–0	VfB Stuttgart	Heidenheim
17:30 CET (UTC+1)	Theuerkauf (yellow card) 44'; Schöppner 70'; Dinkçi (yellow card) 75'; Kleindienst 90+4'	Report	Silas (penalty missed) 57'; Karazor (yellow card) 67'; Anton (yellow card) 74'	Stadium: Voith-Arena; Attendance: 15,000; Referee: Florian Badstübner

11 November 2023 11	Bayern Munich	4–2	1. FC Heidenheim	Munich
15:30 CET (UTC+1)	Mazraoui (yellow card) 3'; Kane 14', 44'; Guerreiro 72'; Choupo-Moting 85'	Report	Kleindienst 67'; Beste 70'	Stadium: Allianz Arena; Attendance: 75,000; Referee: Harm Osmers

26 November 2023 12	1. FC Heidenheim	0–0	VfL Bochum	Heidenheim
15:30 CET (UTC+1)	Dinkçi (yellow card) 51'; Schöppner (yellow card) 51'; Beste (yellow card) 58'; Traoré (yellow card) 77'	Report	Daschner (yellow card) 27'; Schlotterbeck (yellow card) 65'; Antwi-Adjei (yellow card) 90+3'	Stadium: Voith-Arena; Attendance: 15,000; Referee: Felix Zwayer

2 December 2023 13	RB Leipzig	2–1	1. FC Heidenheim	Leipzig
15:30 CET (UTC+1)	Openda 29' (pen.); Poulsen 44'; Simakan (yellow card) 60'; Baumgartner (yellow card) 88'	Report	Gimber 45+2', (yellow card) 88'; Pieringer (yellow card) 86'	Stadium: Red Bull Arena; Attendance: 40,000; Referee: Christian Dingert

9 December 2023 14	1. FC Heidenheim	3–2	Darmstadt 98	Heidenheim
20:30 CET (UTC+1)	Schöppner 42'; Kleindienst (yellow card) 55'; Dinkçi (yellow card) 63'; Mainka 69', 71'	Report	Skarke 52'; Maloney 60' (o.g.); Müller (yellow card) 62'; Karić (yellow card) 82'	Stadium: Voith-Arena; Attendance: 15,000; Referee: Daniel Schlager

16 December 2023 15	Mainz 05	0–1	1. FC Heidenheim	Mainz
15:30 CET (UTC+1)	Krauß (yellow card) 38'; Ajorque (yellow card) 44'; Gruda (yellow card) 90+3'	Report	Pieringer 12'; Gimber (yellow card) 30'; Busch (yellow card) 34'; Beste (yellow card) 57'	Stadium: Mewa Arena; Attendance: 27,200; Referee: Bastian Dankert

20 December 2023 16	1. FC Heidenheim	3–2	SC Freiburg	Heidenheim
20:30 CET (UTC+1)	Schöppner (yellow card) 33'; Föhrenbach (yellow card) 37'; Dinkçi 52'; Gimber (yellow card) 64'; Kleindienst 84'; Ginter 90+2' (o.g.)	Report	Gulde (yellow card) 5'; Höler 7', 64' (pen.); Sildillia (yellow card) 36'; Röhl (yellow card) 60'; Höfler (yellow card) 76'	Stadium: Voith-Arena; Attendance: 15,000; Referee: Benjamin Brand

13 January 2024 17	1. FC Köln	1–1	1. FC Heidenheim	Cologne
17:30 CET (UTC+1)	Chabot (yellow card) 12'; Selke 29'; Hübers (yellow card) 41'	Report	Pieringer (yellow card) 16'; Beck 55'	Stadium: RheinEnergieStadion; Attendance: 50,000; Referee: Felix Zwayer

20 January 2024 18	1. FC Heidenheim	1–1	VfL Wolfsburg	Heidenheim
15:30 CET (UTC+1)	Jenz 45+2' (pen.)	Report	Černý 7'; Gerhardt (yellow card) 45+4'	Stadium: Voith-Arena; Attendance: 15,000; Referee: Timo Gerach

27 January 2024 19	1899 Hoffenheim	1–1	1. FC Heidenheim	Sinsheim
15:30 CET (UTC+1)	Kramarić 45+7' (pen.); Stach (yellow card) 59'; Akpoguma (yellow card) 72'; Brooks (yellow card) 89'; Grillitsch (yellow card) 90+5'	Report	Dinkçi 29'	Stadium: Rhein-Neckar-Arena; Attendance: 20,120; Referee: Tobias Welz

2 February 2024 20	1. FC Heidenheim	0–0	Borussia Dortmund	Heidenheim
20:30 CET (UTC+1)		Report	Maatsen (yellow card) 80'; Malen (yellow card) 90+5'	Stadium: Voith-Arena; Attendance: 15,000; Referee: Bastian Dankert

10 February 2024 21	Werder Bremen	1–2	1. FC Heidenheim	Bremen
15:30 CET (UTC+1)	Schmid 19'; Deman (yellow card) 45'	Report	Kleindienst (yellow card) 2'; Maloney 12', (yellow card) 43'; Beste 18'	Stadium: Weserstadion; Attendance: 41,000; Referee: Robert Schröder

17 February 2024 22	1. FC Heidenheim	1–2	Bayer Leverkusen	Heidenheim
15:30 CET (UTC+1)	Föhrenbach (yellow card) 27'; Gimber (yellow card) 32'; Kleindienst 87'	Report	Frimpong 45+2'; Adli 81'; Andrich (yellow card) 90+2'	Stadium: Voith-Arena; Attendance: 15,000; Referee: Harm Osmers

24 February 2024 23	Union Berlin	2–2	1. FC Heidenheim	Berlin
15:30 CET (UTC+1)	Gosens 44', (yellow card) 45'; Schäfer 45+2'; Juranović (yellow card) 53'	Report	Dovedan 3'; Beste 71'; Traoré (yellow card) 87'	Stadium: Stadion An der Alten Försterei; Attendance: 21,341; Referee: Deniz Aytekin

2 March 2024 24	1. FC Heidenheim	1–2	Eintracht Frankfurt	Heidenheim
15:30 CET (UTC+1)	Pieringer 59'; Dinkçi (yellow card) 62'	Report	Dina Ebimbe (yellow card) 25'; Koch (yellow card) 31'; Gimber 39' (o.g.); Nkounkou 49'; Ekitike (yellow card) 77'; Trapp (yellow card) 86'	Stadium: Voith-Arena; Attendance: 15,000; Referee: Sören Storks

9 March 2024 25	FC Augsburg	1–0	1. FC Heidenheim	Augsburg
15:30 CET (UTC+1)	Gouweleeuw 22'; Mbabu (yellow card) 27'	Report	Gimber (yellow card) 74'; Pick (yellow card) 90+3'; Theuerkauf (yellow card) 90+4'	Stadium: Augsburg Arena; Attendance: 30,660; Referee: Frank Willenborg

16 March 2024 26	1. FC Heidenheim	1–1	Borussia Mönchengladbach	Heidenheim
15:30 CET (UTC+1)	Traoré (yellow card) 36'; Dinkçi 66'; Schmidt (yellow card) 90+2'	Report	Hack 9'; Weigl (yellow card) 18'; Kramer (yellow card) 22'; Wöber (yellow card) 64'	Stadium: Voith-Arena; Attendance: 15,000; Referee: Martin Petersen

31 March 2024 27	VfB Stuttgart	3–3	1. FC Heidenheim	Stuttgart
17:30 CEST (UTC+2)	Guirassy 41'; Stiller 53'; Anton (yellow card) 90+3'; Undav 90+8'	Report	Nübel 62' (o.g.); Kleindienst 84', 85'; Dovedan (red card) 90+6'	Stadium: MHPArena; Attendance: 60,000; Referee: Felix Zwayer

6 April 2024 28	1. FC Heidenheim	3–2	Bayern Munich	Heidenheim
15:30 CEST (UTC+2)	Sessa 50'; Kleindienst 51', 79'; Gimber (yellow card) 62'; Dinkçi (yellow card) 89'	Report	Kane 38'; Gnabry 45'	Stadium: Voith-Arena; Attendance: 15,000; Referee: Robert Schröder

13 April 2024 29	VfL Bochum	1–1	1. FC Heidenheim	Bochum
15:30 CEST (UTC+2)	Passlack (yellow card) 35'; Bernardo (yellow card) 45'; Losilla (yellow card) 52'; Bero (yellow card) 58'; Schlotterbeck 90'	Report	Kleindienst (yellow card) 60'; Schlotterbeck 81' (o.g.)	Stadium: Vonovia Ruhrstadion; Attendance: 24,414; Referee: Patrick Ittrich

20 April 2024 30	1. FC Heidenheim	1–2	RB Leipzig	Heidenheim
15:30 CEST (UTC+2)	Gimber (yellow card) 61'; Dovedan 69'; Schöppner (yellow card) 83'; Traoré (yellow card) 90+8'	Report	Henrichs (yellow card) 33'; Šeško 42'; Openda 85'	Stadium: Voith-Arena; Attendance: 15,000; Referee: Tobias Welz

28 April 2024 31	Darmstadt 98	0–1	1. FC Heidenheim	Darmstadt
19:30 CEST (UTC+2)	Karić (yellow card) 52'; Kempe (yellow card) 60'	Report	Gimber (yellow card) 43'; Dovedan 90+1'	Stadium: Merck-Stadion am Böllenfalltor; Attendance: 17,416; Referee: Bastian Dankert

5 May 2024 32	1. FC Heidenheim	1–1	Mainz 05	Heidenheim
19:30 CEST (UTC+2)	Gimber (yellow card) 35'; Kleindienst 65', (yellow card) 77'	Report	Barreiro (yellow card) 27'; Burkardt 37', (yellow card) 69'; Kohr (yellow card) 84'	Stadium: Voith-Arena; Attendance: 15,000; Referee: Sven Jablonski

11 May 2024 33	SC Freiburg	1–1	1. FC Heidenheim	Freiburg
15:30 CEST (UTC+2)	Dōan 29'; Grifo (yellow card) 64'	Report	Sessa (yellow card) 18', (goal) 38'	Stadium: Europa-Park Stadion; Attendance: 34,700; Referee: Daniel Siebert

18 May 2024 34	1. FC Heidenheim	4–1	1. FC Köln	Heidenheim
15:30 CEST (UTC+2)	Dinkçi 16', 22'; Sessa 36'; Kleindienst (yellow card) 76'; Beste 78'	Report	Kainz (yellow card) 30'; Hübers (yellow card) 52'; Tigges 64'; Maina (yellow card) 77'	Stadium: Voith-Arena; Attendance: 15,000; Referee: Tobias Welz

=== DFB-Pokal ===
13 August 2023 First round	Rostocker FC	0–8	1. FC Heidenheim	Rostock
13:00 CEST (UTC+2)	Weiß (yellow card) 32'; Mietzelfeld (yellow card) 54'	Report	Beck 9'; Kleindienst 12', 15'; Maloney 18'; Pieringer 38', 72'; Dinkçi 53'; Schimmer 87'	Stadium: Ostseestadion; Attendance: 3,500; Referee: Nicolas Winter
Note: The match took place at the Ostseestadion, instead of Rostocker FC's home stadium, the Sportpark am Damerower Weg in Rostock.

31 October 2023 Second round	Borussia Mönchengladbach	3–1	1. FC Heidenheim	Mönchengladbach
20:45 CET (UTC+1)	Pefok 3', 9'; Hack 44'	Report	Beck 78'	Stadium: Borussia-Park; Attendance: 40,000; Referee: Timo Gerach

== Statistics ==
=== Goalscorers ===
As of 2 March 2024

Rank	Pos	No.	Nat.	Player	Bundesliga	DFB-Pokal	Total
1	FW	10	(Germany)	Tim Kleindienst	7	2	9
2	FW	8	(Germany)	Eren Dinkçi	7	1	8
3	FW	37	(Germany)	Jan-Niklas Beste	7	0	7
4	FW	18	(Germany)	Marvin Pieringer	3	2	5
5	MF	21	(Germany)	Adrian Beck	1	2	3
6	MF	3	(Germany)	Jan Schöppner	2	0	2
6	DF	6	(Germany)	Patrick Mainka	2	0	2
6	MF	33	(United States)	Lennard Maloney	1	1	2
9	FW	9	(Germany)	Stefan Schimmer	0	1	1
9	MF	5	(Germany)	Benedikt Gimber	1	0	1
9	FW	20	(Austria)	Nikola Dovedan	1	0	1
Own goals					2	0	1
Totals					34	9	43
