= Marvin Pieringer =

German footballer (born 1999)

Personal information
- Date of birth: 4 October 1999 (age 27)
- Place of birth: Metzingen, Germany
- Height: 1.89 m (6 ft 2 in)
- Positions: Forward; attacking midfielder

Team information
- Current team: SC Paderborn
- Number: 18

Youth career
- TV Bempflingen
- –2011: TuS Metzingen
- 2011–2018: SSV Reutlingen 05

Senior career*
| Years | Team | Apps | (Gls) |
| 2017–2018 | SSV Reutlingen 05 | 20 | (6) |
| 2018–2022 | SC Freiburg II | 60 | (21) |
| 2021 | → Würzburger Kickers (loan) | 20 | (6) |
| 2021–2022 | → Schalke 04 (loan) | 24 | (2) |
| 2021–2022 | → Schalke 04 II (loan) | 1 | (0) |
| 2022–2023 | Schalke 04 | 0 | (0) |
| 2022–2023 | → SC Paderborn (loan) | 23 | (10) |
| 2023–2026 | 1. FC Heidenheim | 91 | (16) |
| 2026– | SC Paderborn | 8 | (0) |
- * Club domestic league appearances and goals as of 31 October 2026

Marvin Pieringer (born 4 October 1999) is a German professional footballer who plays as a forward or attacking midfielder for Bundesliga club SC Paderborn.

== Career ==
=== Würzburger Kickers ===
Pieringer made his professional debut for Würzburger Kickers in the 2. Bundesliga on 6 January 2021, starting in the home match against FC St. Pauli. He scored a penalty in the 9th minute of the match, which finished as a 1–1 draw.

=== Schalke 04 ===
On 25 June 2021, Pieringer agreed to join Schalke 04 on loan for the 2021–22 season with an option to make the move permanent. On 12 May 2022, Schalke exercised this option.

==== Loan to SC Paderborn ====
On 28 July 2022, he joined Paderborn 07 on a season-long loan.

=== 1. FC Heidenheim ===
On 3 July 2023, Pieringer signed with 1. FC Heidenheim, which promoted to the Bundesliga.

=== Return to SC Paderborn ===
On 26 August 2026, Pieringer rejoined SC Paderborn for €3 million on a four-year contract.

== Career statistics ==
As of match played 31 October 2026

Appearances and goals by club, season and competition
| Club | Season | League | | | DFB-Pokal | | Europe | | Total | |
| Club | Season | Division | Apps | Goals | Apps | Goals | Apps | Goals | Apps | Goals |
|---|---|---|---|---|---|---|---|---|---|---|
| SSV Reutlingen | 2017–18 | Oberliga Baden-Württ. | 20 | 6 | — | | — | | 20 | 6 |
| SC Freiburg II | 2018–19 | Regionalliga Südwest | 30 | 4 | — | | — | | 30 | 4 |
| SC Freiburg II | 2019–20 | Regionalliga Südwest | 16 | 5 | — | | — | | 16 | 5 |
| SC Freiburg II | 2020–21 | Regionalliga Südwest | 14 | 12 | — | | — | | 14 | 12 |
| SC Freiburg II | Total | | 60 | 21 | — | | — | | 60 | 21 |
| Würzburger Kickers (loan) | 2020–21 | 2. Bundesliga | 20 | 6 | — | | — | | 20 | 6 |
| Schalke 04 (loan) | 2021–22 | 2. Bundesliga | 24 | 2 | 2 | 0 | — | | 26 | 2 |
| Schalke 04 II (loan) | 2021–22 | Regionalliga West | 1 | 0 | — | | — | | 1 | 0 |
| Schalke 04 | 2022–23 | Bundesliga | 0 | 0 | 0 | 0 | — | | 0 | 0 |
| SC Paderborn (loan) | 2022–23 | 2. Bundesliga | 23 | 10 | 3 | 4 | — | | 26 | 14 |
| 1. FC Heidenheim | 2023–24 | Bundesliga | 31 | 3 | 2 | 2 | — | | 33 | 5 |
| 1. FC Heidenheim | 2024–25 | Bundesliga | 31 | 7 | 1 | 0 | 6 (Note: Appearances in UEFA Conference League) | 1 | 38 | 8 |
| 1. FC Heidenheim | 2025–26 | Bundesliga | 27 | 4 | 1 | 0 | — | | 28 | 4 |
| 1. FC Heidenheim | 2026–27 | 2. Bundesliga | 2 | 2 | 1 | 0 | — | | 3 | 2 |
| 1. FC Heidenheim | Total | | 91 | 16 | 5 | 2 | 6 | 1 | 102 | 19 |
| SC Paderborn | 2026–27 | Bundesliga | 8 | 0 | 1 | 0 | — | | 9 | 0 |
| Career total | | | 247 | 61 | 11 | 6 | 6 | 1 | 263 | 68 |

== Honours ==
Schalke 04

- 2. Bundesliga: 2021–22
