= Benedikt Gimber =

German footballer (born 1997)

Personal information
- Full name: Benedikt Steffen Gimber
- Date of birth: 19 February 1997 (age 29)
- Place of birth: Buchen, Germany
- Height: 1.85 m (6 ft 1 in)
- Position: Centre-back

Team information
- Current team: Granada
- Number: 23

Youth career
- TSV Sulzbach
- –2009: SV Schefflenz
- 2009–2016: TSG Hoffenheim

Senior career*
Years	Team	Apps	(Gls)
2015–2018	TSG Hoffenheim	0	(0)
2015–2018	TSG Hoffenheim II	21	(2)
2016–2017	→ SV Sandhausen (loan)	0	(0)
2016–2017	→ SV Sandhausen II (loan)	5	(0)
2017	→ Karlsruher SC (loan)	9	(0)
2017–2018	→ Jahn Regensburg (loan)	26	(1)
2018–2019	FC Ingolstadt 04	22	(0)
2019–2023	Jahn Regensburg	102	(4)
2023–2026	1. FC Heidenheim	78	(1)
2026–	Granada	0	(0)

International career^{‡}
2012	Germany U15	2	(0)
2012	Germany U16	1	(0)
2013–2014	Germany U17	15	(1)
2014	Germany U18	3	(0)
2015–2016	Germany U19	13	(0)
2016–2018	Germany U20	10	(1)
- * Club domestic league appearances and goals as of 15 August 2026 ‡ National team caps and goals as of 21:39, 4 January 2023 (UTC)

Benedikt Steffen Gimber (born 19 February 1997) is a German professional footballer who plays as a centre-back for Segunda División club Granada.

== Career ==
In June 2017, Gimber was loaned out to Jahn Regensburg by TSG Hoffenheim. In May 2018, it was announced he would join FC Ingolstadt 04 for the 2018–19 season having agreed a contract until 2021. The transfer fee paid to Hoffenheim was reported as €1 million.

On 27 August 2019, Gimber returned to Regensburg. On 19 August 2026, after a three-season spell at 1. FC Heidenheim, he moved abroad and joined Spanish Segunda División side Granada.

== Career statistics ==
As of match played 15 August 2026

Appearances and goals by club, season and competition
Club	Season	League			Cup		Europe		Other		Total	
Club	Season	Division	Apps	Goals	Apps	Goals	Apps	Goals	Apps	Goals	Apps	Goals
1899 Hoffenheim	2015–16	Bundesliga	0	0	0	0	—		0	0	0	0
1899 Hoffenheim II	2015–16	Regionalliga Südwest	21	2	—		—		—		21	2
SV Sandhausen (loan)	2016–17	2. Bundesliga	0	0	0	0	—		0	0	0	0
SV Sandhausen II (loan)	2016–17	Oberliga Baden-Württemberg	5	0	—		—		—		5	0
Karlsruher SC	2016–17	2. Bundesliga	9	0	0	0	—		—		9	0
Jahn Regensburg (loan)	2017–18	2. Bundesliga	26	1	2	0	—		—		28	1
Ingolstadt 04	2018–19	2. Bundesliga	22	0	1	0	—		—		23	0
Ingolstadt 04	2019–20	3. Liga	0	0	0	0	—		2 (Note: Appearances in Bavarian Cup)	0	2	0
Ingolstadt 04	Total		22	0	1	0	—		2	0	25	0
Jahn Regensburg	2019–20	2. Bundesliga	22	0	0	0	—		—		22	0
Jahn Regensburg	2020–21	2. Bundesliga	22	0	3	0	—		—		25	0
Jahn Regensburg	2021–22	2. Bundesliga	30	3	2	0	—		—		32	3
Jahn Regensburg	2022–23	2. Bundesliga	28	1	1	0	—		—		29	1
Jahn Regensburg	Total		102	4	6	0	—		0	0	108	4
Jahn Regensburg II	2020–21	Bayernliga	1	0	—		—		—		1	0
Heidenheim	2023–24	Bundesliga	24	1	1	0	—		—		25	1
Heidenheim	2024–25	Bundesliga	32	0	2	0	2 (Note: Appearances in UEFA Conference League)	0	—		36	0
Heidenheim	2025–26	Bundesliga	21	0	1	0	—		—		22	0
Heidenheim	2026–27	Bundesliga	1	0	0	0	—		—		1	0
Heidenheim	Total		78	1	4	0	2	0	—		84	1
Career total			264	8	13	0	2	0	2	0	281	8

== Honours ==
Individual

- Fritz Walter Medal U17 Gold: 2014
