= Thomas Keller (footballer) =

German footballer (born 1999)

Personal information
- Full name: Thomas Leon Keller
- Date of birth: 5 August 1999 (age 27)
- Place of birth: Munich, Germany
- Height: 1.87 m (6 ft 2 in)
- Position: Centre-back

Team information
- Current team: Dynamo Dresden
- Number: 39

Youth career
- –2017: SpVgg Unterhaching
- 2017–2018: FC Ingolstadt

Senior career*
| Years | Team | Apps | (Gls) |
| 2018–2020 | FC Ingolstadt II | 28 | (3) |
| 2019–2022 | FC Ingolstadt | 61 | (6) |
| 2022–2026 | 1. FC Heidenheim | 19 | (0) |
| 2026 | → Dynamo Dresden (loan) | 14 | (3) |
| 2026– | Dynamo Dresden | 0 | (0) |
- * Club domestic league appearances and goals as of 18 May 2026

Thomas Leon Keller (born 5 August 1999) is a German professional footballer who plays as a centre-back for 2. Bundesliga club Dynamo Dresden.

== Career ==
Keller made his professional debut for FC Ingolstadt in the 3. Liga on 22 July 2019, starting in the away match against Carl Zeiss Jena which finished as a 2–1 win.

On 27 April 2022, Keller signed a three-year contract with 1. FC Heidenheim, effective from 1 July 2022.

On 2 January 2026, Keller was loaned by Dynamo Dresden in 2. Bundesliga. On 10 July 2026, he returned to Dynamo Dresden on a permanent basis.

== Career statistics ==
As of match played 13 December 2025

Appearances and goals by club, season and competition
| Club | Season | League | | | Cup | | Europe | | Other | | Total | |
| Club | Season | Division | Apps | Goals | Apps | Goals | Apps | Goals | Apps | Goals | Apps | Goals |
|---|---|---|---|---|---|---|---|---|---|---|---|---|
| Ingolstadt 04 II | 2018–19 | Regionalliga Bayern | 26 | 1 | — | | — | | — | | 26 | 1 |
| Ingolstadt 04 | 2019–20 | 3. Liga | 16 | 3 | 1 | 0 | — | | 1 (Note: Appearance in relegation play-offs) | 0 | 18 | 3 |
| Ingolstadt 04 | 2020–21 | 3. Liga | 26 | 2 | 0 | 0 | — | | 1 (Note: Appearance in Bavarian Cup) | 0 | 27 | 2 |
| Ingolstadt 04 | 2021–22 | 2. Bundesliga | 19 | 1 | 2 | 0 | — | | — | | 21 | 1 |
| Ingolstadt 04 | Total | | 61 | 6 | 3 | 0 | — | | 2 | 0 | 66 | 6 |
| 1. FC Heidenheim | 2022–23 | 2. Bundesliga | 7 | 0 | 1 | 0 | — | | — | | 8 | 0 |
| 1. FC Heidenheim | 2023–24 | Bundesliga | 2 | 0 | 0 | 0 | — | | — | | 2 | 0 |
| 1. FC Heidenheim | 2024–25 | Bundesliga | 6 | 0 | 0 | 0 | 2 (Note: Appearances in UEFA Conference League) | 1 | — | | 8 | 1 |
| 1. FC Heidenheim | 2025–26 | Bundesliga | 3 | 0 | 0 | 0 | — | | — | | 3 | 0 |
| 1. FC Heidenheim | Total | | 19 | 0 | 1 | 0 | 2 | 1 | — | | 21 | 1 |
| Career total | | | 106 | 7 | 4 | 0 | 2 | 1 | 2 | 0 | 113 | 8 |
