= Omar Haktab Traoré =

German footballer (born 1998)

Personal information
- Date of birth: 4 February 1998 (age 28)
- Place of birth: Osnabrück, Germany
- Height: 1.85 m (6 ft 1 in)
- Position: Right-back

Team information
- Current team: Watford
- Number: 23

Youth career
- –2015: VfL Osnabrück
- 2015–2017: Eintracht Braunschweig

Senior career*
Years	Team	Apps	(Gls)
2017–2018	SC Spelle-Venhaus		
2018–2020	SV Rödinghausen	44	(1)
2020–2021	KFC Uerdingen 05	19	(0)
2021–2023	VfL Osnabrück	69	(5)
2023–2026	1. FC Heidenheim	86	(0)
2026	Udinese	0	(0)
2026–	Watford	0	(0)
- * Club domestic league appearances and goals as of 16 May 2026

Omar Haktab Traoré (born 4 February 1998) is a German professional footballer who plays as a right-back for EFL Championship club Watford.

== Career ==
Traoré signed for KFC Uerdingen 05 on a three-year contract in summer 2020.

Traoré signed for VfL Osnabrück on a two-year contract in summer 2021. Traoré achieved promotion back to the 2. Bundesliga with Osnabrück in the 2022–23 season, but following the expiry of his contract in summer 2023, he joined newly-promoted Bundesliga club 1. FC Heidenheim on a three-year contract.

On 3 July 2026, Traoré joined Serie A club Udinese after his contract with Heidenheim expired. Upon signing, the club signaled that Traoré might join EFL Championship club Watford. Two weeks later, on 16 July, Traoré signed a three-year contract with Watford in exchange for an undisclosed fee.

== Personal life ==
Born in Germany, Traoré is of Togolese descent. He is the older brother of VfL Osnabrück player Hakim Traoré.

== Career statistics ==
As of match played 16 May 2026

Appearances and goals by club, season and competition
Club	Season	League			Cup		Europe		Other		Total	
Club	Season	Division	Apps	Goals	Apps	Goals	Apps	Goals	Apps	Goals	Apps	Goals
SV Rödinghausen	2017–18	Regionalliga West	6	0	0	0	—		—		6	0
SV Rödinghausen	2018–19	Regionalliga West	11	0	0	0	—		—		11	0
SV Rödinghausen	2019–20	Regionalliga West	27	1	1	0	—		—		28	0
SV Rödinghausen	Total		44	1	1	0	—		—		45	1
Uerdingen 05	2020–21	3. Liga	19	0	—		—		—		19	0
VfL Osnabrück	2021–22	3. Liga	33	2	2	0	—		—		35	2
VfL Osnabrück	2022–23	3. Liga	36	3	0	0	—		—		36	3
VfL Osnabrück	Total		69	5	2	0	—		—		71	5
1. FC Heidenheim	2023–24	Bundesliga	31	0	1	0	—		—		32	0
1. FC Heidenheim	2024–25	Bundesliga	30	0	2	0	9 (Note: Appearances in UEFA Conference League)	0	—		41	0
1. FC Heidenheim	2025–26	Bundesliga	25	0	1	0	—		—		26	0
1. FC Heidenheim	Total		86	0	4	0	9	0	—		99	0
Career total			218	6	7	0	9	0	0	0	234	5
