= Lennard Maloney =

American soccer player (born 1999)

Personal information
- Full name: Lennard Patrick Maloney
- Date of birth: October 8, 1999 (age 27)
- Place of birth: Berlin, Germany
- Height: 6 ft 2 in (1.88 m)
- Position: Defensive midfielder

Team information
- Current team: Mainz 05
- Number: 15

Youth career
- Köpenicker SC
- –2012: Blau-Weiß Mahlsdorf
- 2012–2017: Union Berlin

Senior career*
Years	Team	Apps	(Gls)
2017–2020	Union Berlin	1	(0)
2020	→ Chemnitzer FC (loan)	8	(0)
2020–2022	Borussia Dortmund II	61	(2)
2020–2022	Borussia Dortmund	2	(0)
2022–2025	1. FC Heidenheim	73	(1)
2025–	Mainz 05	31	(0)

International career^{‡}
2017	Germany U18	2	(0)
2017	Germany U19	1	(0)
2018	United States U20	2	(0)
2023–	United States	2	(0)
- * Club domestic league appearances and goals as of October 30, 2026 ‡ National team caps and goals as of November 20, 2023

Lennard Patrick Maloney (born October 8, 1999) is a professional soccer player who plays as a defensive midfielder for Bundesliga club Mainz 05. Born in Germany, he represents the United States national team.

== Club career ==
=== Union Berlin ===
Maloney spent six years in the youth academy of Union Berlin. In the 2017–18 Under 19 Bundesliga season, Maloney made 23 appearances for Union Berlin. On April 1, 2018, Maloney made his professional debut by starting in a 2. Bundesliga match against Greuther Fürth.

==== Loan to Chemnitzer FC ====
On January 31, 2020, Maloney was loaned out to Chemnitzer FC until the end of the 2019–20 season. His debut for Chemnitz came on February 15 as he started against 1. FC Magdeburg. He made eight appearances in total for Chemnitz.

=== Borussia Dortmund II ===
On August 7, 2020, Maloney joined Borussia Dortmund II on a free transfer.

He scored his first goal in a 2–0 win over SV Lippstadt on March 20, 2021.

=== Borussia Dortmund ===
On October 23, 2021, Maloney made his debut for Borussia Dortmund's senior team in the Bundesliga, coming on as a sub in the 88th minute in Dortmund's 3–1 win over Arminia Bielefeld. He made a second Bundesliga appearance in the reverse fixture, coming on as a substitute in the 85th minute. During the 2021–22 season he also had two further matchday squad nominations.

=== 1. FC Heidenheim ===
On April 27, 2022, German media reported that he would join 1. FC Heidenheim on a free transfer from July 1. Maloney signed a three-year contract with the German second-division club.

=== Mainz ===
On January 21, 2025, Maloney signed a three-and-a-half-year contract with Mainz 05.

== International career ==
=== Youth ===
Maloney was capped by Germany youth national teams at under-18 and under-19 level in friendly matches. On July 7, 2018, Maloney accepted a call-up to the United States under-20 side and stated his desire to play for the United States. He earned his first two United States under-20 caps in friendlies against North Carolina FC and Tobacco Road FC.

=== Senior ===
In October 2023, Maloney received his first call-up to the United States senior team ahead of two friendlies against Germany and Ghana. Notably, he is the first ever Heidenheim player to be called up to a senior national team.

== Style of play ==
Maloney is a hard-tackling defensive midfielder who can also be deployed at center-back.

== Personal life ==
Maloney was born in Germany to an American father and German mother.

== Career statistics ==
=== Club ===
As of match played October 30, 2026

Appearances and goals by club, season and competition
Club	Season	League			National cup		Continental		Other		Total	
Club	Season	Division	Apps	Goals	Apps	Goals	Apps	Goals	Apps	Goals	Apps	Goals
Union Berlin	2017–18	2. Bundesliga	1	0	—		—		—		1	0
Chemnitzer FC (loan)	2019–20	3. Liga	8	0	—		—		—		8	0
Borussia Dortmund II	2020–21	Regionalliga West	34	1	—		—		—		34	1
Borussia Dortmund II	2021–22	3. Liga	27	1	—		—		—		27	1
Borussia Dortmund II	Total		61	2	—		—		—		61	2
Borussia Dortmund	2021–22	Bundesliga	2	0	—		—		—		2	0
1. FC Heidenheim	2022–23	2. Bundesliga	33	0	1	0	—		—		34	0
1. FC Heidenheim	2023–24	Bundesliga	29	1	2	1	—		—		31	2
1. FC Heidenheim	2024–25	Bundesliga	11	0	2	0	7 (Note: Appearances in UEFA Conference League)	0	—		20	0
1. FC Heidenheim	Total		73	1	5	1	7	0	—		85	2
Mainz 05	2024–25	Bundesliga	5	0	—		—		—		5	0
Mainz 05	2025–26	Bundesliga	21	0	2	0	8	0	—		31	0
Mainz 05	2026–27	Bundesliga	5	0	1	0	—		—		6	0
Mainz 05	Total		31	0	3	0	8	0	—		42	0
Career total			176	3	8	1	15	0	0	0	199	4

=== International ===
As of match played November 20, 2023

Appearances and goals by national team and year
National team	Year	Apps	Goals
United States	2023	2	0
Total		2	0
