= Luca Kerber =

German footballer

Personal information
- Date of birth: 10 March 2002 (age 24)
- Place of birth: Dillingen, Germany
- Height: 1.80 m (5 ft 11 in)
- Position: Midfielder

Team information
- Current team: 1. FC Heidenheim
- Number: 20

Youth career
- –2016: SSV Pachten
- 2016–2021: 1. FC Saarbrücken

Senior career*
Years	Team	Apps	(Gls)
2021–2024	1. FC Saarbrücken	113	(11)
2024–	1. FC Heidenheim	44	(4)
- * Club domestic league appearances and goals as of 15:30, 20 September 2026 (UTC)

Luca Kerber (born 10 March 2002) is a German professional footballer who plays as a midfielder for 2. Bundesliga club 1. FC Heidenheim.

== Career ==
Kerber played for the youth team of SSV Pachten, before joining the academy of 1. FC Saarbrücken in 2016. He made his professional debut for Saarbrücken's first team in the 3. Liga on 9 January 2021, starting in an away match against SV Meppen, which finished as a 1–0 loss.

On 9 April 2024, Kerber signed a three-year contract with Bundesliga club 1. FC Heidenheim, effective in July 2024.

== Career statistics ==
As of match played 20 September 2026

Appearances and goals by club, season and competition
Club	Season	League			DFB-Pokal		Continental		Other		Total	
Club	Season	Division	Apps	Goals	Apps	Goals	Apps	Goals	Apps	Goals	Apps	Goals
1. FC Saarbrücken	2020–21	3. Liga	19	0	0	0	—		—		19	0
1. FC Saarbrücken	2021–22	3. Liga	27	1	0	0	—		—		27	1
1. FC Saarbrücken	2022–23	3. Liga	33	3	0	0	—		—		33	3
1. FC Saarbrücken	2023–24	3. Liga	34	7	5	1	—		—		39	8
1. FC Saarbrücken	Total		113	11	5	1	—		—		118	12
1. FC Heidenheim	2024–25	Bundesliga	23	2	2	0	8 (Note: Appearances in UEFA Conference League)	0	—		33	2
1. FC Heidenheim	2025–26	Bundesliga	18	2	2	0	—		—		20	2
1. FC Heidenheim	2026–27	2. Bundesliga	3	0	1	0	—		—		4	0
1. FC Heidenheim	Total		44	4	5	0	8	0	—		57	4
Career total			157	15	10	1	8	0	0	0	175	16
