= Sirlord Conteh =

German footballer

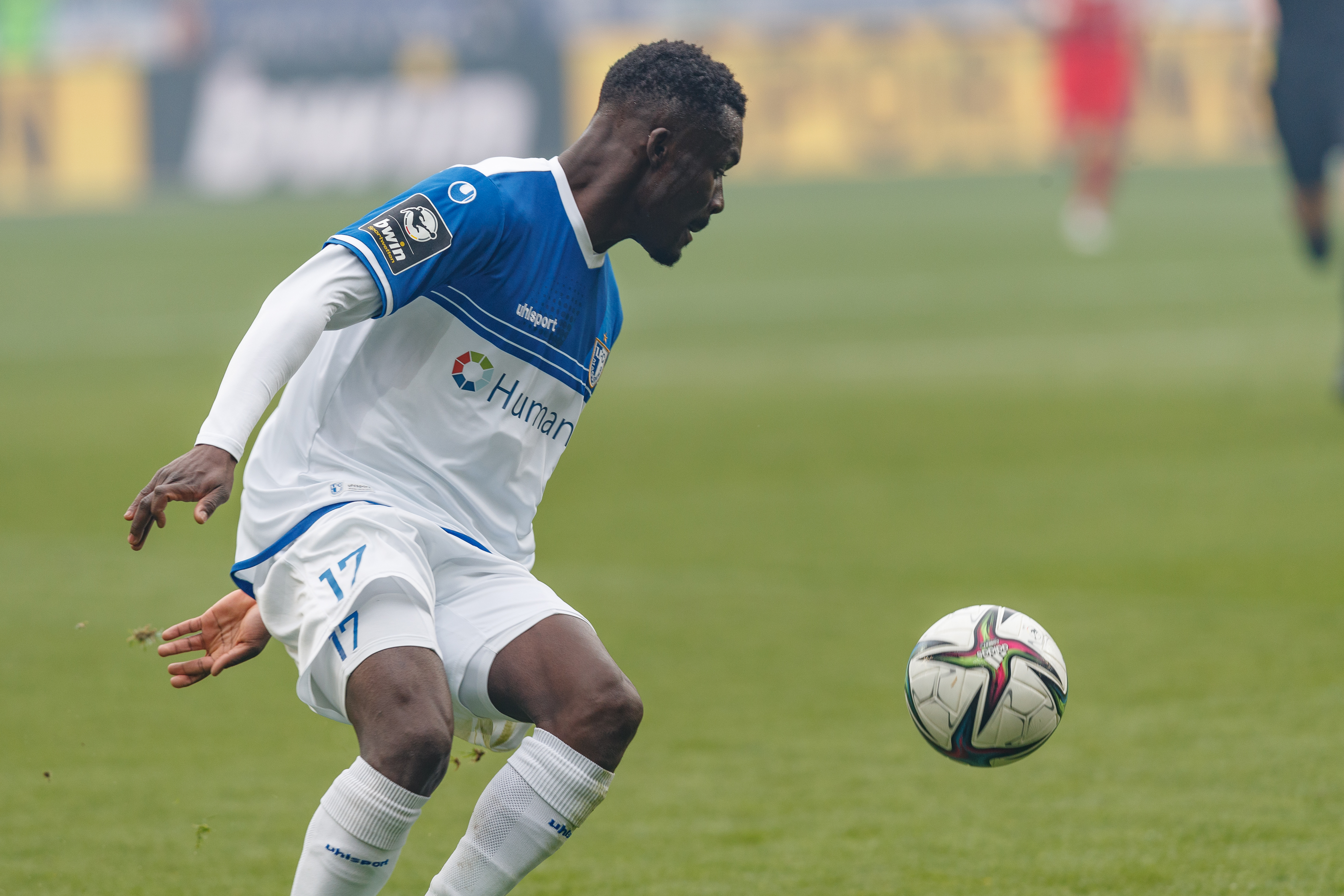
- 2022 at 1. FC Magdeburg

Personal information
- Full name: Sirlord Calvin Conteh
- Date of birth: 9 July 1996 (age 30)
- Place of birth: Hamburg, Germany
- Height: 1.78 m (5 ft 10 in)
- Position: Winger

Team information
- Current team: 1. FC Heidenheim
- Number: 31

Youth career
- –2013: Concordia Hamburg
- 2013–2014: SC Vorwärts-Wacker 04
- 2014: VfB Lübeck

Senior career*
Years	Team	Apps	(Gls)
2014–2015	TSV Sasel	29	(6)
2015–2019	FC St. Pauli II	101	(25)
2019–2022	1. FC Magdeburg	62	(9)
2022–2024	SC Paderborn	67	(9)
2024–	1. FC Heidenheim	42	(2)
- * Club domestic league appearances and goals as of 21 March 2026

Sirlord Calvin Conteh (born 9 July 1996) is a German professional footballer who plays as a winger for 2. Bundesliga club 1. FC Heidenheim.

== Career ==
Conteh made his professional debut for 1. FC Magdeburg in the 3. Liga on 3 August 2019, starting against SV Meppen before being substituted out in the 42nd minute for Manfred Osei Kwadwo, with the away match finishing as a 3–1 win.

In May 2022, 2. Bundesliga club SC Paderborn 07 announced the signing of Conteh.

On 29 April 2024, Conteh signed a three-year contract with 1. FC Heidenheim, beginning in July 2024. On 7 November, Conteh scored the opening goal in a 0–2 victory over Hearts in a UEFA Conference League league stage game.

== Personal life ==
Conteh was born in Hamburg to Ghanaian parents. His younger brother Christian is also a professional footballer who also plays for Heidenheim.

== Career statistics ==
As of match played 21 March 2026

Appearances and goals by club, season and competition
Club	Season	League			Cup		Continental		Other		Total	
Club	Season	Division	Apps	Goals	Apps	Goals	Apps	Goals	Apps	Goals	Apps	Goals
TSV Sasel	2014–15	Landesliga Hamburg-Hammonia	29	6	—		—		—		29	6
FC St. Pauli II	2015–16	Regionalliga Nord	17	1	—		—		—		17	1
FC St. Pauli II	2016–17	Regionalliga Nord	29	5	—		—		—		29	5
FC St. Pauli II	2017–18	Regionalliga Nord	27	8	—		—		—		27	8
FC St. Pauli II	2018–19	Regionalliga Nord	28	11	—		—		—		28	11
FC St. Pauli II	Total		101	25	—		—		—		101	25
1. FC Magdeburg	2019–20	3. Liga	22	2	0	0	—		1 (Note: Appearances in Saxony-Anhalt Cup)	0	23	2
1. FC Magdeburg	2020–21	3. Liga	19	2	1	0	—		1	0	21	2
1. FC Magdeburg	2021–22	3. Liga	21	5	1	2	—		2	4	24	11
1. FC Magdeburg	Total		62	9	2	2	—		4	4	68	15
Paderborn 07	2022–23	2. Bundesliga	33	6	3	1	—		—		36	7
Paderborn 07	2023–24	2. Bundesliga	34	3	3	0	—		—		37	3
Paderborn 07	Total		67	9	6	1	—		—		73	10
1. FC Heidenheim	2024–25	Bundesliga	28	1	0	0	8 (Note: Appearances in UEFA Conference League)	2	—		36	3
1. FC Heidenheim	2025–26	Bundesliga	14	1	1	1	—		—		15	2
1. FC Heidenheim	Total		42	2	1	1	8	2	—		51	5
Career total			301	52	9	4	8	2	4	4	322	62
