= Mikkel Kaufmann =

Danish footballer (born 2001)

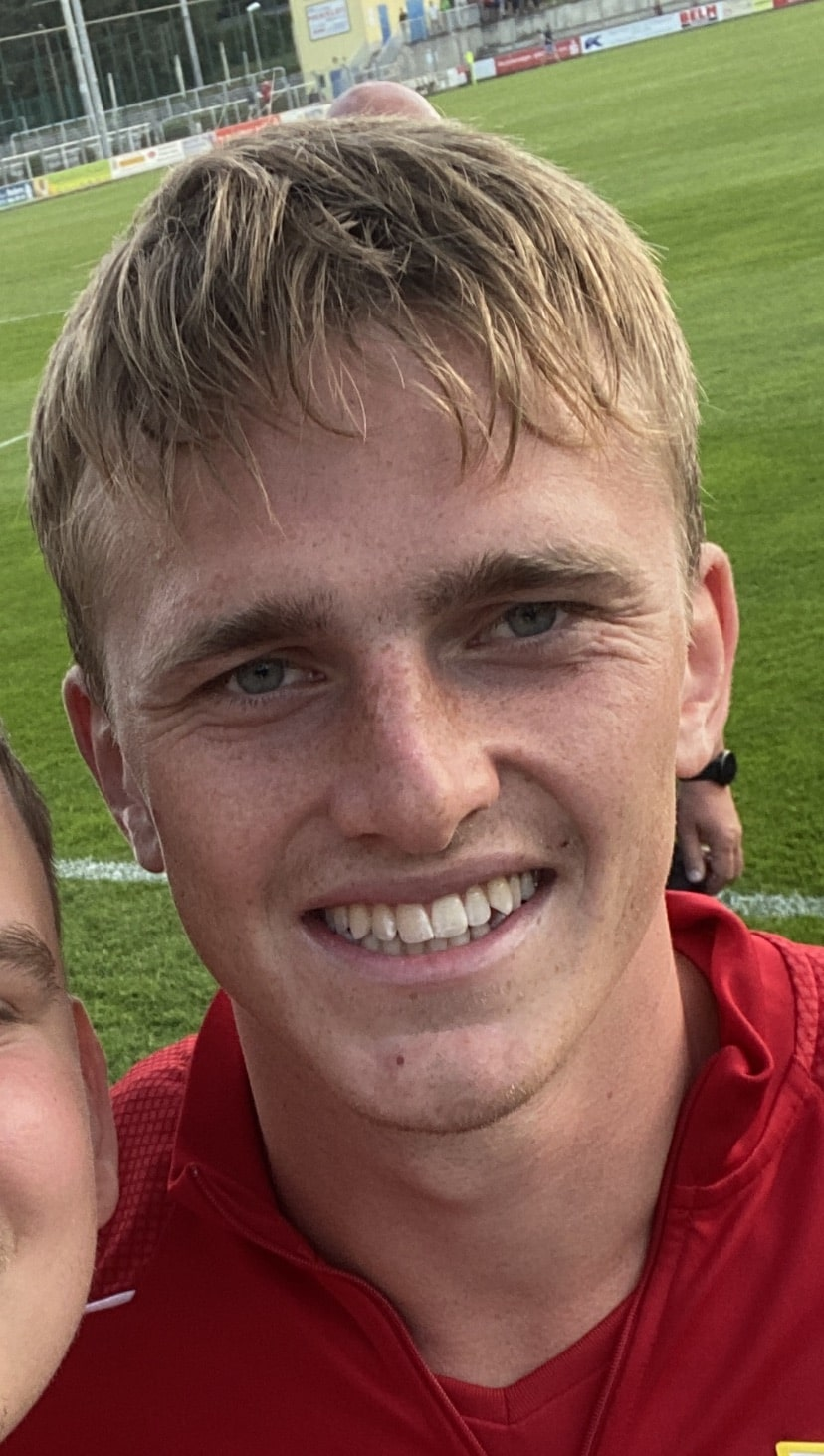

Personal information
- Full name: Mikkel Kaufmann Sørensen
- Date of birth: 3 January 2001 (age 25)
- Place of birth: Hjørring, Denmark
- Height: 1.89 m (6 ft 2 in)
- Position: Forward

Team information
- Current team: 1. FC Heidenheim
- Number: 29

Youth career
- Hjørring IF
- 2015–2018: AaB

Senior career*
Years	Team	Apps	(Gls)
2018–2020	AaB	26	(9)
2020–2023	Copenhagen	30	(2)
2021–2022	→ Hamburger SV (loan)	26	(2)
2022–2023	→ Karlsruher SC (loan)	30	(10)
2023–2024	Union Berlin	18	(1)
2024–	1. FC Heidenheim	28	(1)
2025	→ Karlsruher SC (loan)	14	(1)

International career^{‡}
2017–2018	Denmark U17	6	(0)
2018	Denmark U18	2	(1)
2018–2019	Denmark U19	13	(4)
2021	Denmark U20	2	(0)
2021	Denmark U21	2	(0)
- * Club domestic league appearances and goals as of 20 September 2026 ‡ National team caps and goals as of 12 October 2021

Mikkel Kaufmann Sørensen (born 3 January 2001) is a Danish professional footballer who plays as a forward for German 2. Bundesliga club 1. FC Heidenheim.

== Career ==
=== AaB ===
A youth prospect of AaB, Kaufmann made his official debut for the club on 6 August 2018 in a game against Vendsyssel FF, coming on the pitch from the bench with three minutes left. On 7 April 2019, Kaufmann scored his first professional goal against Hobro IK in stoppage time, as the game ended 1–1.

=== Copenhagen ===
On 24 January 2020, Danish Superliga champions Copenhagen announced, that they had signed AaB topscorer Kaufmann from the summer 2020. However, after Carlo Holse was sold from Copenhagen, the club decided to bring him in immediately on the last day of the winter transfer market. The fee was rumored to be about DKK 20 million plus an additional 1.5 million to sign him immediately. Kaufmann's transfer became the third biggest deal in the history of AaB.

On 9 July 2021, Kaufmann joined Hamburger SV on a season-long loan deal. After a disappointing season in Hamburger with two goals 32 games, Kaufmann was loaned out again: fellow league club, Karlsruher SC, confirmed on 22 June 2022, that Kaufmann had been loaned out to the club for one year.

=== Union Berlin ===
On 12 June 2023, it was announced that Kaufmann had signed for Bundesliga club Union Berlin for a reported fee of €2.7 million.

=== Heidenheim ===
On 28 June 2024, Kaufmann signed a four-year contract with 1. FC Heidenheim. On 17 January 2025, Kaufmann returned to Karlsruher SC on loan until the end of the 2024–25 season.

== Career statistics ==
As of match played 20 September 2026

Appearances and goals by club, season and competition
Club	Season	League			National cup		Continental		Other		Total	
Club	Season	Division	Apps	Goals	Apps	Goals	Apps	Goals	Apps	Goals	Apps	Goals
AaB	2018–19	Danish Superliga	8	1	1	0	—		—		9	1
AaB	2019–20 (Note: Kaufmann additionally appeared in a 2019–20 Danish Cup second round match against Nørresundby FB.)	Danish Superliga	17	7	2	0	—		—		19	7
AaB	Total		25	8	3	0	—		—		28	8
Copenhagen	2019–20	Danish Superliga	15	1	0	0	5 (Note: Appearances in UEFA Europa League)	0	—		20	1
Copenhagen	2020–21	Danish Superliga	15	1	1	0	2	0	—		18	1
Copenhagen	Total		30	2	1	0	7	0	—		38	2
Hamburger SV II	2021–22	Regionalliga Nord	1	0	—		—		—		1	0
Hamburger SV	2021–22	2. Bundesliga	26	2	4	0	—		2 (Note: Appearances in promotion play-offs)	0	32	2
Karlsruher SC	2022–23	2. Bundesliga	30	10	2	0	—		—		32	10
Union Berlin	2023–24	Bundesliga	18	1	1	0	—		—		19	1
1. FC Heidenheim	2024–25	Bundesliga	9	0	2	0	6 (Note: Appearances in UEFA Conference League)	0	—		17	0
1. FC Heidenheim	2025–26	Bundesliga	16	2	1	1	—		—		17	3
1. FC Heidenheim	2026–27	2. Bundesliga	4	0	1	1	—		—		5	1
1. FC Heidenheim	Total		29	2	4	2	6	0	—		39	4
Karlsruher SC (loan)	2024–25	2. Bundesliga	14	1	—		—		—		14	1
Career total			159	25	15	2	13	0	2	0	189	27
