= Maximilian Breunig =

German footballer (born 2000)

Personal information
- Date of birth: 14 August 2000 (age 26)
- Place of birth: Würzburg, Germany
- Height: 1.93 m (6 ft 4 in)
- Position: Forward

Team information
- Current team: 1. FC Heidenheim
- Number: 14

Youth career
- –2015: Greuther Fürth
- 2015–2018: Würzburger Kickers
- 2018–2019: → FC Ingolstadt (loan)

Senior career*
Years	Team	Apps	(Gls)
2018–2022	Würzburger Kickers	33	(6)
2018	Würzburger Kickers II	1	(0)
2018–2019	→ FC Ingolstadt II (loan)	3	(4)
2020–2021	→ Admira Wacker (loan)	23	(5)
2022–2024	SC Freiburg II	42	(14)
2023–2024	SC Freiburg	2	(0)
2024–	1. FC Heidenheim	17	(3)
2025–2026	→ 1. FC Magdeburg (loan)	18	(3)

International career^{‡}
2019	Germany U19	1	(0)
- * Club domestic league appearances and goals as of 6 September 2026 ‡ National team caps and goals as of 21:55, 26 August 2019 (UTC)

Maximilian Breunig (born 14 August 2000) is a German professional footballer who plays as a forward for 2. Bundesliga club 1. FC Heidenheim.

== Club career ==
On 16 May 2024, Breunig signed a three-year contract with Bundesliga club 1. FC Heidenheim, effective in July 2024.

On 1 September 2025, Breunig was loaned by 1. FC Magdeburg in 2. Bundesliga.

== Personal life ==
He is the older brother of fellow footballer Louis Breunig who also played for Würzburger Kickers.

== Career statistics ==
As of match played 6 September 2026

Appearances and goals by club, season and competition
Club	Season	League			Cup		Europe		Other		Total	
Club	Season	Division	Apps	Goals	Apps	Goals	Apps	Goals	Apps	Goals	Apps	Goals
Würzburger Kickers	2017–18	3. Liga	1	0	0	0	—		—		1	0
Würzburger Kickers	2019–20	3. Liga	11	3	0	0	—		—		11	3
Würzburger Kickers	2021–22	3. Liga	21	3	3	2	—		—		24	5
Würzburger Kickers	Total		33	6	3	2	—		—		36	8
Ingolstadt II (loan)	2018–19	Regionalliga Bayern	3	4	—		—		—		3	4
Admira Wacker (loan)	2020–21	Austrian Bundesliga	23	5	0	0	—		—		23	5
SC Freiburg II	2022–23	3. Liga	17	3	—		—		—		17	3
SC Freiburg II	2023–24	3. Liga	23	10	—		—		—		23	10
SC Freiburg II	Total		40	13	—		—		—		40	13
SC Freiburg	2023–24	Bundesliga	2	0	1	0	1 (Note: Appearances in UEFA Europa League)	0	—		4	0
1. FC Heidenheim	2024–25	Bundesliga	13	2	2	3	7 (Note: Appearances in UEFA Conference League)	0	—		22	5
1. FC Heidenheim	2026–27	2. Bundesliga	4	1	1	0	—		—		5	1
1. FC Heidenheim	Total		17	3	3	3	7	0	—		27	6
1. FC Magdeburg (loan)	2025–26	2. Bundesliga	18	3	2	1	—		—		20	4
Career total			140	34	9	6	8	0	0	0	157	40
