= Tim Siersleben =

German footballer

Personal information
- Full name: Tim Siersleben
- Date of birth: 9 March 2000 (age 26)
- Place of birth: Magdeburg, Germany
- Height: 1.87 m (6 ft 2 in)
- Position: Centre-back

Team information
- Current team: 1. FC Heidenheim
- Number: 4

Youth career
- 2006–2016: 1. FC Magdeburg
- 2016–2019: VfL Wolfsburg

Senior career*
Years	Team	Apps	(Gls)
2019–2021	VfL Wolfsburg II	23	(0)
2020–2023	VfL Wolfsburg	1	(0)
2021–2023	→ 1. FC Heidenheim (loan)	43	(1)
2023–	1. FC Heidenheim	49	(0)

International career^{‡}
2016	Germany U16	1	(0)
2016	Germany U17	2	(0)
2019	Germany U20	2	(0)
- * Club domestic league appearances and goals as of 13 September 2026 ‡ National team caps and goals as of 14:52, 22 May 2021 (UTC)

Tim Siersleben (born 9 March 2000) is a German footballer who plays as a centre-back for 2. Bundesliga club 1. FC Heidenheim.

== Career ==
Siersleben made his professional debut for VfL Wolfsburg in the Bundesliga on 22 May 2021, coming on as a substitute in the 57th minute for John Brooks against Mainz 05.

On 1 July 2021, Siersleben joined 1. FC Heidenheim on a two-year loan.

== Career statistics ==
As of match played 13 September 2026

Appearances and goals by club, season and competition
Club	Season	League			National cup		Europe		Other		Total	
Club	Season	Division	Apps	Goals	Apps	Goals	Apps	Goals	Apps	Goals	Apps	Goals
VfL Wolfsburg II	2019–20	Regionalliga Nord	22	0	—		—		—		22	0
VfL Wolfsburg II	2020–21	Regionalliga Nord	1	0	—		—		—		1	0
VfL Wolfsburg II	Total		23	0	—		—		—		23	0
VfL Wolfsburg	2019–20	Bundesliga	0	0	0	0	0	0	—		0	0
VfL Wolfsburg	2020–21	Bundesliga	1	0	0	0	0	0	—		1	0
VfL Wolfsburg	Total		1	0	0	0	0	0	—		1	0
1. FC Heidenheim (loan)	2021–22	2. Bundesliga	15	0	0	0	—		—		15	0
1. FC Heidenheim (loan)	2022–23	2. Bundesliga	28	1	2	0	—		—		30	1
1. FC Heidenheim (loan)	Total		43	1	2	0	—		—		45	1
1. FC Heidenheim	2023–24	Bundesliga	14	0	2	0	—		—		16	0
1. FC Heidenheim	2024–25	Bundesliga	16	0	2	0	9 (Note: Appearances in UEFA Conference League)	1	2 (Note: Appearances in Bundesliga relegation play-offs)	1	29	2
1. FC Heidenheim	2025–26	Bundesliga	15	0	2	0	—		—		17	0
1. FC Heidenheim	2026–27	2. Bundesliga	4	0	0	0	—		—		4	0
1. FC Heidenheim	Total		49	0	6	0	9	1	2	1	66	2
Career total			116	1	8	0	9	1	2	1	135	3

== Personal life ==
Siersleben is the son of former footballer and manager Frank Siersleben.
