= Eren Dinkçi =

German footballer (born 2001)

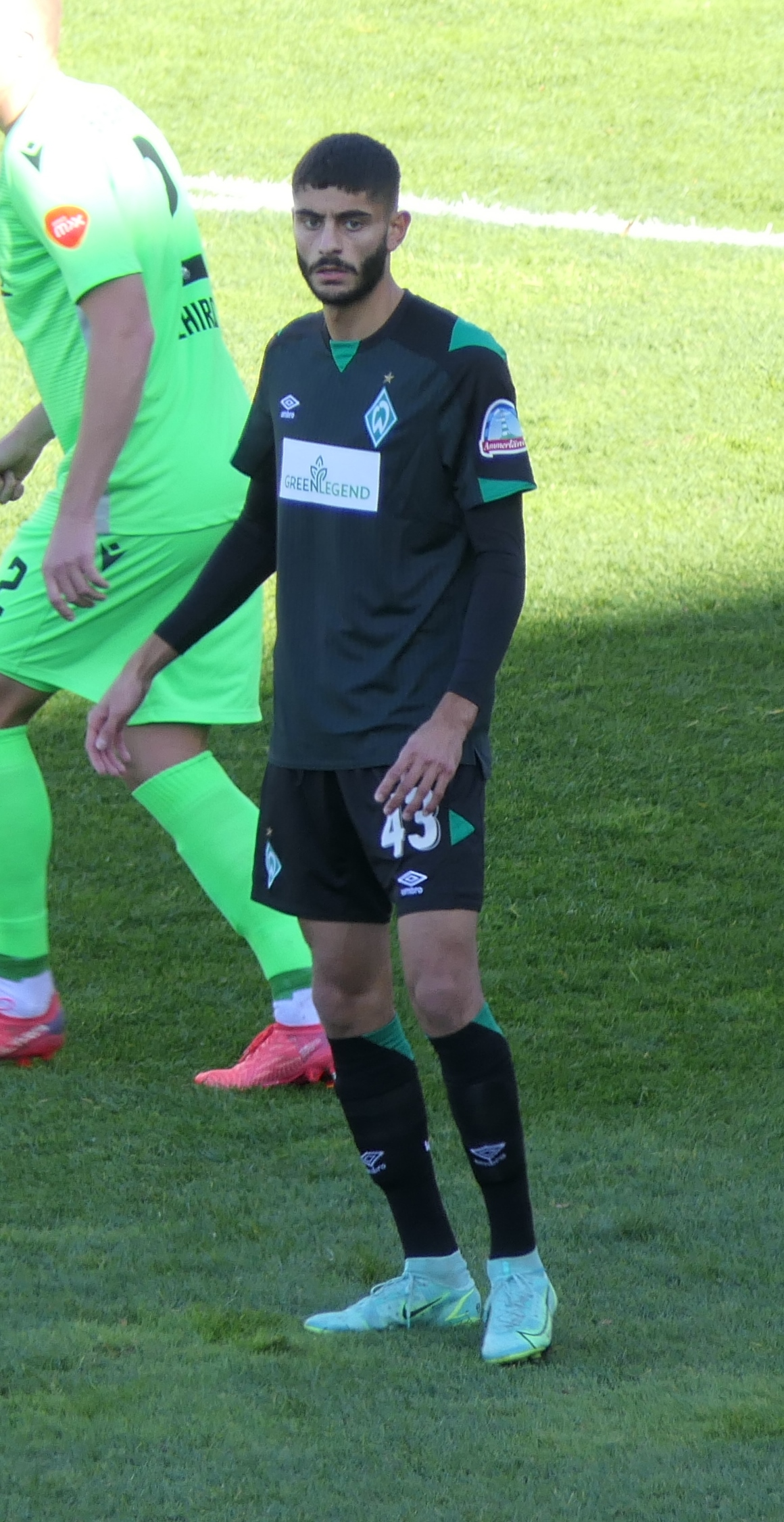
- Dinkçi with Werder Bremen in 2021

Personal information
- Full name: Eren Sami Dinkçi
- Date of birth: 13 December 2001 (age 24)
- Place of birth: Bremen, Germany
- Height: 1.88 m (6 ft 2 in)
- Positions: Attacking midfielder; right winger

Team information
- Current team: Werder Bremen (on loan from SC Freiburg)
- Number: 18

Youth career
- –2019: SC Borgfeld
- 2019–2020: Werder Bremen
- 2019: → SC Borgfeld (loan)

Senior career*
Years	Team	Apps	(Gls)
2020–2024	Werder Bremen II	10	(9)
2020–2024	Werder Bremen	46	(1)
2023–2024	→ 1. FC Heidenheim (loan)	33	(10)
2024–	SC Freiburg	30	(0)
2024	SC Freiburg II	1	(0)
2026	→ 1. FC Heidenheim (loan)	14	(3)
2026–	→ Werder Bremen (loan)	7	(2)

International career^{‡}
2020	Turkey U19	1	(0)
2020	Germany U20	3	(0)
- * Club domestic league appearances and goals as of 17:30, 31 October 2026 (UTC) ‡ National team caps and goals as of 23:28, 14 October 2021 (UTC)

Eren Sami Dinkçi (born 13 December 2001) is a professional footballer who plays as an attacking midfielder or right winger for Bundesliga club Werder Bremen, on loan from SC Freiburg. Born in Germany, he represented both Turkey and Germany internationally as a junior, before choosing to represent Turkey as a senior.

== Club career ==
In his youth, Dinkçi played for hometown club SC Borgfeld. In January 2019, Dinkçi signed a contract with Werder Bremen lasting until 2022, though he was loaned back to SC Borgfeld for six months before joining Werder's youth academy in July 2019. Dinkçi made his professional debut for Werder Bremen in the Bundesliga on 19 December 2020, coming on as a substitute in the 86th minute for Romano Schmid against Mainz 05. In the 90th minute, he scored the winning goal for Bremen in a 1–0 away victory with a header via an assist from Tahith Chong. In April 2022, Dinkçi agreed a contract extension with Werder Bremen.

Dinkçi joined 1. FC Heidenheim, newly promoted to the Bundesliga, on loan for the 2023–24 season. During that season, he managed to record top speed of 36.41 kilometres per hour (22.62 mph) as Bundesliga's fastest player along with Alphonso Davies.

In April 2024, it was announced Dinkçi would join Bundesliga club SC Freiburg for the 2024–25 season. On 30 January 2026, Dinkçi returned to 1. FC Heidenheim on loan. Dinkçi re-joined Werder Bremen on loan in August 2026.

== International career ==
Born in Germany, Dinkçi is of Turkish descent. In 2020, he made one appearance for the Turkey U19s. That same year he switched and made three appearances for the Germany U20s.

In September 2024, Dinkçi switched his allegiance again and was included into the senior Turkey national team for the UEFA Nations League games against Wales and Iceland, but remained on the bench in both games.

== Career statistics ==
As of match played 31 October 2026

Appearances and goals by club, season and competition
Club	Season	League			DFB-Pokal		Europe		Other		Total	
Club	Season	Division	Apps	Goals	Apps	Goals	Apps	Goals	Apps	Goals	Apps	Goals
Werder Bremen II	2020–21	Regionalliga Nord	8	7	–		–		–		8	7
Werder Bremen II	2022–23	Regionalliga Nord	2	2	–		–		–		2	2
Werder Bremen II	Total		10	9	–		–		–		10	9
Werder Bremen	2020–21	Bundesliga	8	1	2	0	–		–		10	1
Werder Bremen	2021–22	2. Bundesliga	21	0	1	0	–		–		22	0
Werder Bremen	2022–23	Bundesliga	18	0	1	0	–		–		19	0
Werder Bremen	Total		47	1	4	0	–		–		51	1
1. FC Heidenheim (loan)	2023–24	Bundesliga	33	10	1	1	–		–		34	11
SC Freiburg	2024–25	Bundesliga	22	0	1	0	—		—		23	0
SC Freiburg	2025–26	Bundesliga	8	0	1	1	3 (Note: Appearances in UEFA Europa League)	0	—		12	1
SC Freiburg	Total		30	0	2	1	3	0	—		35	1
SC Freiburg II	2024–25	Regionalliga Südwest	1	0	–		–		–		1	0
1. FC Heidenheim (loan)	2025–26	Bundesliga	14	3	–		–		–		14	3
Werder Bremen (loan)	2026–27	Bundesliga	7	2	1	0	–		–		8	2
Career total			142	25	8	2	3	0	0	0	153	27
