= Nikola Dovedan =

Austrian association football player (born 1994)

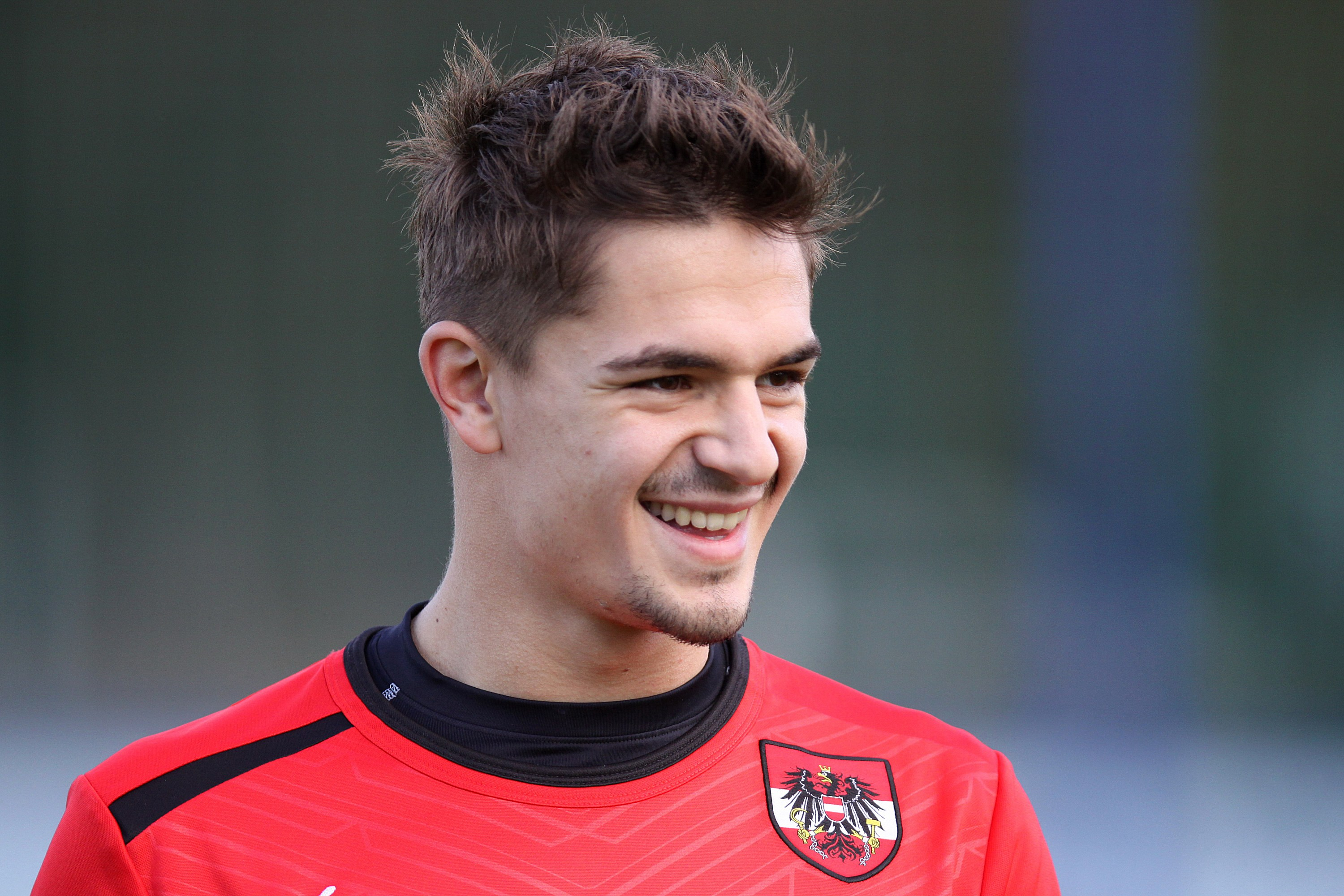
- Dovedan with Austria U21 in 2015

Personal information
- Date of birth: 6 July 1994 (age 32)
- Place of birth: Tulln an der Donau, Austria
- Height: 1.72 m (5 ft 7 1/2 in)
- Positions: Second striker; winger

Youth career
- 2001–2006: Tulln
- 2006–2010: Austria Wien
- 2010–2012: Red Bull Salzburg

Senior career*
Years	Team	Apps	(Gls)
2012–2014	Liefering	51	(17)
2014–2017	LASK	58	(10)
2016–2017	→ Rheindorf Altach (loan)	32	(10)
2017–2019	Heidenheim	58	(14)
2019–2022	Nürnberg	93	(12)
2022–2023	Austria Wien	20	(1)
2022	Austria Wien II	1	(0)
2023–2024	Heidenheim	21	(3)
2024–2025	Fatih Karagümrük	37	(1)
2025–2026	Iraklis	14	(0)

International career
2014–2016	Austria U21	16	(2)
- * Club domestic league appearances and goals as of 7 July 2026

Nikola Dovedan (born 6 July 1994) is an Austrian professional footballer who plays as a second striker or winger.

== Career ==
From 2016 til 2017, Dovedan played for SC Rheindorf Altach in the Austrian Bundesliga. In summer 2017, he joined Heidenheim. After stations in Nürnberg and by Austria Wien, Dovedan returned to Heidenheim in 2023. He left Heidenheim at the end of the 2023–24 season.
