= Elidon Qenaj =

German footballer (born 2003)

Personal information
- Date of birth: 22 May 2003 (age 23)
- Place of birth: Böblingen, Germany
- Height: 1.98 m (6 ft 6 in)
- Position: Forward

Team information
- Current team: FV Illertissen
- Number: 9

Youth career
- VfB Vaihingen/Enz
- –2019: VfB Stuttgart
- 2020–2022: 1. FC Heidenheim

Senior career*
Years	Team	Apps	(Gls)
2022–2024	1. FC Heidenheim	3	(0)
2025–2026	VSG Altglienicke	20	(3)
2026–	FV Illertissen	11	(4)
- * Club domestic league appearances and goals as of 27 September 2026

Elidon Qenaj (born 22 May 2003) is a German and Kosovo-Albanian professional footballer who plays as a forward for Regionalliga Bayern side FV Illertissen.

== Career ==
After starting out in the youth ranks at VfB Vaihingen/Enz and VfB Stuttgart, he moved to the youth section of 1. FC Heidenheim in the winter of 2020. He played 18 games for his club in the Under 19 Bundesliga, scoring a total of five goals. He signed his first professional contract with his club in May 2022 and made his first professional appearance in the 2. Bundesliga on 12 August 2022, when he came on as a substitute for Stefan Schimmer in the 83rd minute of a 3–0 away win against 1. FC Nürnberg.

On 21 February Heidenheim announced the extension of his contract until the summer of 2024.

On 2 October 2025, Qenaj signed for VSG Altglienicke.
