= Voith-Arena =

Football stadium in Heidenheim, Germany

Coordinates: 48°40′7″N 10°8′22″E

- Albstadion
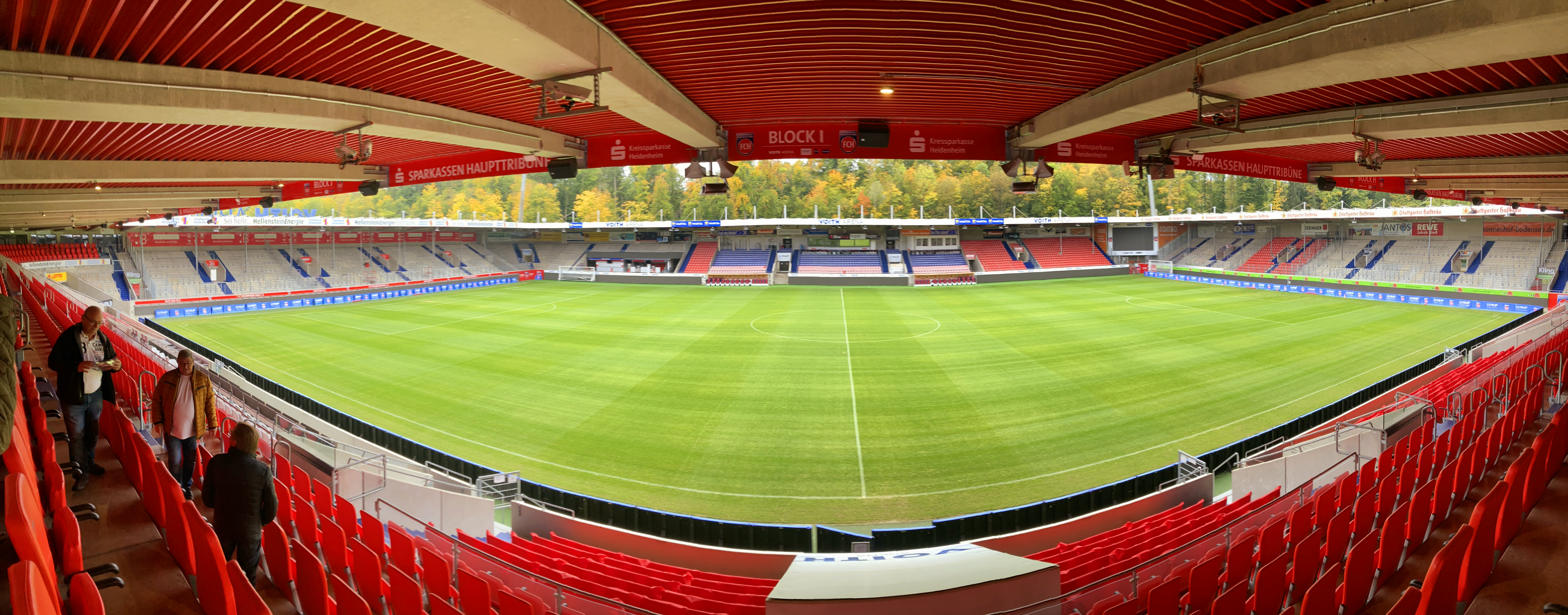
- Interactive map of Voith-Arena
- Former names: GAGFAH-Arena
- Address: Schloßhaustraße 162
- Location: 89522 Heidenheim
- Owner: City of Heidenheim an der Brenz
- Operator: 1. FC Heidenheim
- Capacity: 15,000
- Executive suites: 37
- Surface: Hybrid grass
- Field size: 105m x 68m

Construction
- Built: 1972
- Renovated: 2013

Tenant
- 1. FC Heidenheim

Website
- voith-arena.de

Voith-Arena (formerly GAGFAH-Arena, Albstadion) is a multi-use stadium in Heidenheim, Germany. It is currently used for football matches and is the home stadium of the Bundesliga side 1. FC Heidenheim. The stadium has a capacity of 15,000 people after its most recent expansion.

== See also ==
- List of football stadiums in Germany
- Lists of stadiums
