= Frank Schmidt (footballer) =

German footballer and manager

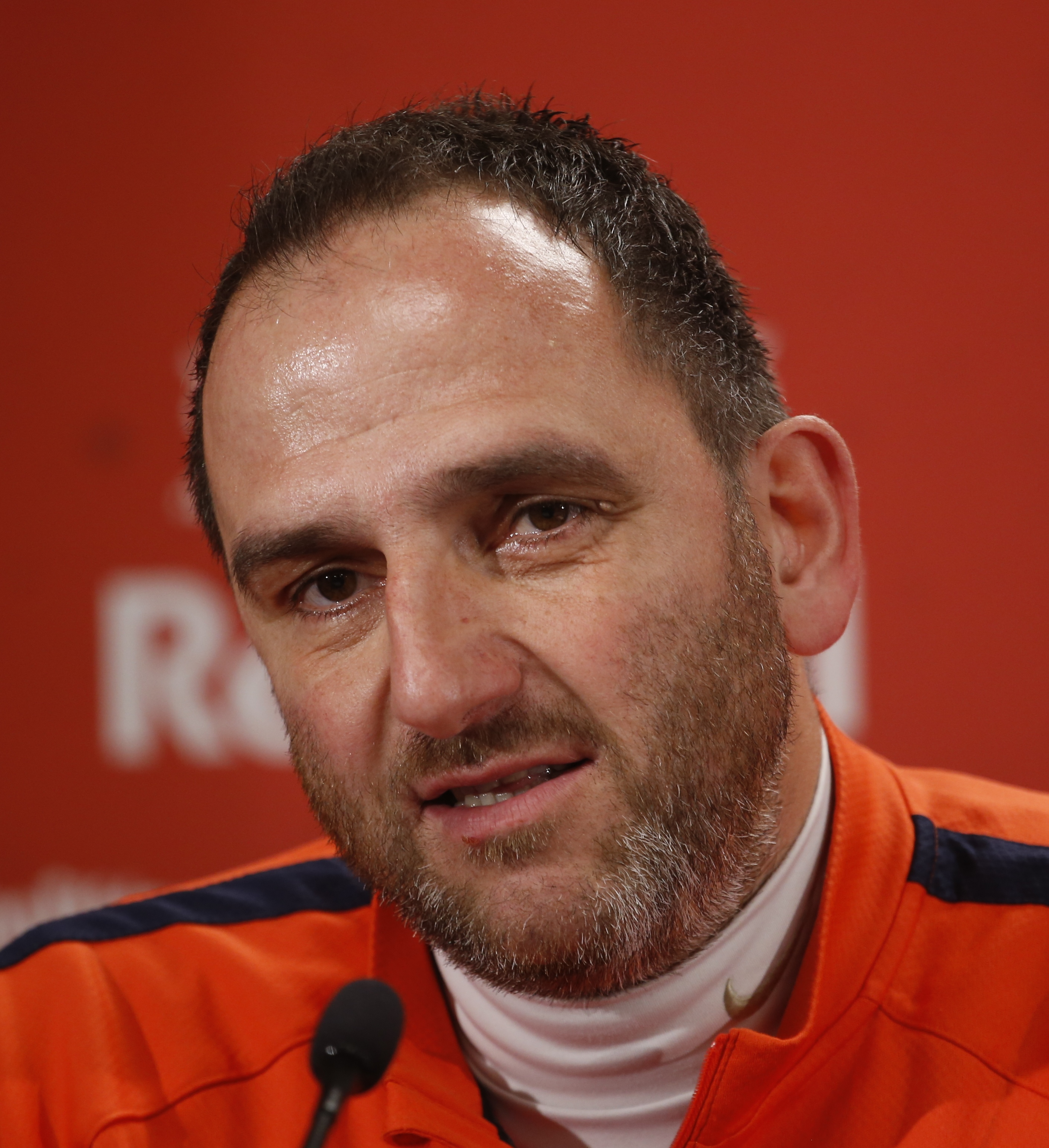
- Schmidt in 2016

Personal information
- Date of birth: 3 January 1974 (age 52)
- Place of birth: Heidenheim, West Germany
- Height: 1.90 m (6 ft 3 in)
- Position: Defender

Team information
- Current team: 1. FC Heidenheim (head coach)

Youth career
- SC Giengen
- TSC Giengen
- SSV Ulm

Senior career*
Years	Team	Apps	(Gls)
1992–1994	1. FC Nürnberg (A)	50	(10)
1992–1994	1. FC Nürnberg	0	(0)
1994–1996	TSV Vestenbergsgreuth	51	(10)
1996–1997	Greuther Fürth	5	(1)
1997	Wiener SC	13	(3)
1997–1998	First Vienna	28	(2)
1998–2003	Alemannia Aachen	101	(18)
2003	Waldhof Mannheim	8	(0)
2003–2007	1. FC Heidenheim	112	(22)
Total		368	(66)

International career
1993	Germany U-20	1	(0)

Managerial career
- 2007–: 1. FC Heidenheim
- * Club domestic league appearances and goals

Frank Schmidt (born 3 January 1974) is a German football manager and former professional player. He has been the head coach of 2. Bundesliga club 1. FC Heidenheim since 2007. During his career he played as a defender.

On 17 September 2023, he became the longest-serving manager at a single club in German football history.

== Club career ==
Schmidt was born in Heidenheim. He began his career with 1. FC Nürnberg, and was promoted to the first team in 1992, and made his debut for the club in the first round of the 1992–93 DFB-Pokal, as a substitute for Hans Dorfner in a 7–1 win over amateur side TSV Osterholz. This was to be his only first-team appearance for the club, though, and in January 1994 he moved to TSV Vestenbergsgreuth, of the third-tier Oberliga Bayern. In his first season with the club he helped them qualify for the new third level of German football, the Regionalliga Süd, and the following year he was part of the team that shocked German champions Bayern Munich by knocking them out in the first round of the 1994–95 DFB-Pokal with a 1–0 win.

In 1996, TSV Vestenbergsgreuth merged with SpVgg Fürth to form SpVgg Greuther Fürth, and Schmidt was retained by the new club, but found it hard to break into the team, and left in 1997, joining Wiener SC, a lower league team in Austria. After six months with WSC he joined their neighbours First Vienna, where he spent a year playing in the Second Division, before returning to Germany to sign for Alemannia Aachen.

Schmidt's first season with Aachen was a successful one, with the club winning the Regionalliga West/Südwest and promotion to the 2. Bundesliga, although it was marred by the sad death of coach Werner Fuchs not long before the season's end. Schmidt was a first-team regular in Aachen's first half-season in the second tier, before an injury suffered in a match against Tennis Borussia Berlin put him out of football for almost the whole of 2000. He returned to action for the second half of the 2000–01, and was a first-team regular during 2001–02, as the club narrowly escaped relegation, but signings such as Alexander Klitzpera and Quido Lanzaat in summer 2002 caused him to lose his place, and he left Aachen for SV Waldhof Mannheim in January 2003, having been restricted to substitute appearances during the first half of the season.

Schmidt made eight appearances for Waldhof, who were also in the 2. Bundesliga, but was unable to prevent them being relegated in last place, and was released at the end of the 2002–03 season. He then signed for his hometown club, Heidenheimer SB, of the fifth-tier Verbandsliga Württemberg, and won promotion to the Oberliga Baden-Württemberg in his first season, with a second-place finish. He played at this level for a further three seasons, achieving top-five finishes each time, before retiring as a player at the end of the 2006–07 season.

== International career ==
Schmidt was named in Germany's squad for the 1993 FIFA World Youth Championship in Australia. He made one appearance during the tournament, as a substitute for Carsten Jancker in a 2–2 draw with Ghana in Germany's second group game, but the team were eliminated in the group stage.

== Coaching career ==
In 2007, Heidenheimer SB's football section was separated from its parent club, and took on a new name 1. FC Heidenheim. Not long after the beginning of the season, coach Dieter Märkle was sacked, and Schmidt was brought in to replace him. He achieved a fourth-place finish in his first season in charge, enough to qualify for the Regionalliga Süd, which was to become the fourth tier of German football, following the introduction of a new national 3. Liga, which Heidenheim would reach the following year (2009) after winning the Regionalliga Süd title. Schmidt managed the club for five years at this level, finishing in the top half each time, until they won the division in 2013–14 and earned promotion to the 2. Bundesliga.

In 2021, he became the longest-serving current manager of any German professional football club.

After nine years in the second tier of German football, on 28 May 2023, Schmidt brought Heidenheim to the Bundesliga for the first time ever as two goals in stoppage time away at Jahn Regensburg, including a 99th-minute winner from Tim Kleindienst, secured a 3–2 win and moved Heidenheim from the playoff-bound third place to the top of the table in the space of ten minutes at the expense of Hamburger SV. Heidenheim therefore became the 2. Bundesliga champion on goal difference ahead of Darmstadt 98.

On 17 September 2023, he became the longest-serving manager at a single club in German football history, surpassing Volker Finke's 16 years of service at SC Freiburg. In the 2023–24 season, he led Heidenheim to an eighth-place finish in their debut season in Bundesliga, securing a UEFA Conference League berth, to be their first participation in European competitions. In the 2024-25 season, he qualified with Heidenheim for the play-off round after the League stage, where the club was eliminated by Copenhagen. The club secured their Bundesliga spot, by winning the relegation play-off.

== Managerial statistics ==
As of match played 20 November 2026

Managerial record by team and tenure
Team	Nat	From	To	Record					Ref
Team	Nat	From	To	G	W	D	L	Win %	Ref
1. FC Heidenheim	(Germany)	17 September 2007	Present	742	326	181	235	43.94	
Total				742	326	181	235	43.94	—

== Honours ==
=== Player ===
Alemannia Aachen

- Regionalliga West/Südwest (III): 1999

=== Manager ===
1. FC Heidenheim

- 2. Bundesliga (II): 2022–23
- 3. Liga (III): 2013–14
- Regionalliga Süd (IV): 2009
- Württemberg Cup: 2008, 2011, 2012, 2013, 2014

Individual

- 3. Liga Manager of the Year: 2013–14
