= Adrian Beck =

German footballer (born 1997)

Personal information
- Date of birth: 9 June 1997 (age 29)
- Place of birth: Crailsheim, Germany
- Height: 1.86 m (6 ft 1 in)
- Position: Attacking midfielder

Team information
- Current team: VfL Osnabrück (on loan from 1. FC Heidenheim)
- Number: 21

Youth career
- –2010: TSV Gerabronn
- 2010–2012: FSV Hollenbach
- 2012–2016: TSG Hoffenheim

Senior career*
Years	Team	Apps	(Gls)
2016–2018	TSG Hoffenheim II	4	(1)
2018–2019	SSV Ulm	19	(4)
2019–2020	Union Saint-Gilloise	4	(0)
2019–2020	→ Hamilton Academical (loan)	6	(0)
2020–2022	SSV Ulm	74	(17)
2022–	1. FC Heidenheim	99	(9)
2026–	→ VfL Osnabrück (loan)	0	(0)
- * Club domestic league appearances and goals as of 15 August 2026

Adrian Beck (born 9 June 1997) is a German professional footballer who plays as an attacking midfielder for 2. Bundesliga club VfL Osnabrück, on loan from 1. FC Heidenheim.

== Career ==
Born in Crailsheim, Beck spent time with TAG Hoffenheim and their reserve team, SSV Ulm and Union Saint-Gilloise in Belgium, before moving on loan to Scottish club Hamilton Academical in September 2019. The loan ended on 30 January 2020 and the following day, he returned to SSV Ulm.

On 11 May 2022, Beck signed a three-year contract with 1. FC Heidenheim beginning on 1 July 2022. He signed for VfL Osnabrück on loan in August 2026.
