= 1. FC Heidenheim =

German professional football club

- Full name: 1. Fußballclub; Heidenheim 1846 e.V.
- Nickname: FCH
- Short name: FCH
- Founded: 1 January 1846; 180 years ago 1 January 1972; 54 years ago (current)
- Stadium: Voith-Arena
- Capacity: 15,000
- President: Holger Sanwald
- Head coach: Frank Schmidt
- League: 2. Bundesliga
- 2025–26: Bundesliga, 17th of 18 (relegated)
- Website: Official website
Home colours	Away colours	Third colours

1. FC Heidenheim 1846 is a German professional association football club from the town of Heidenheim, Baden-Württemberg. The club currently plays in the 2. Bundesliga, the second tier of the German football league system. They are also the oldest professional football club in Germany.

== History ==
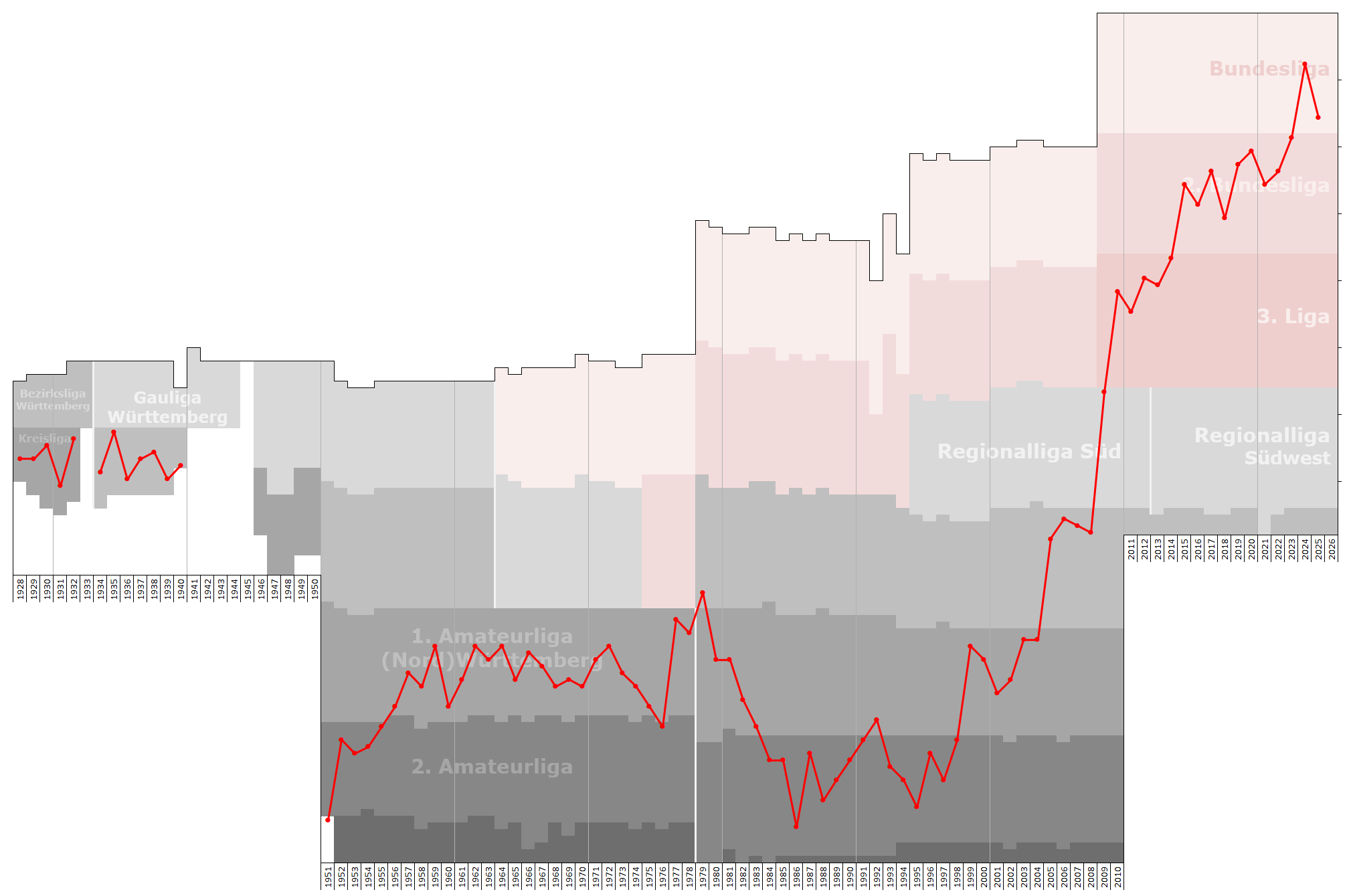
Historical chart of Heidenheim league performance

The club was formed in 2007 through the separation of the football section from parent association Heidenheimer Sportbund, a larger multi sports club that has 5,800 members in 25 departments. The independence of the football side allows it to operate under the stricter economic standards set for professional clubs which are members of the German Football Association (Deutscher Fußball-Bund or DFB).

Logo of parent association Heidenheimer SB

Heidenheimer SB itself was founded through the 1972 merger of TSB Heidenheim and VfL Heidenheim. The club's origins go back to 14 August 1846, with the establishment of the gymnastics club Turngemeinde Heidenheim, which folded in 1852, but was re-constituted under the same name in 1861. The club was renamed Turnverein Heidenheim in 1872.

A football department was created within the association on 8 July 1890 and became an independent side known as VfR Heidenheim on 21 August 1922. The swimming club Schwimmverein 04 Heidenheim joined VfR in 1936 to form VfL Heidenheim 04. In 1949, following World War II, these two clubs went their separate ways, the swimmers under their original name, and the footballers as VfL Heidenheim 1890.

In the meantime, parent club TV 1846 Heidenheim was joined on 13 July 1935 by SpVgg Heidenheim and then on 3 April 1937 merged with 1. Sportverein 1900 Heidenheim – which was known as Athletenklub Hellenstein until 1920 – to become TSV 1846 Heidenheim. After the war TSV was united with Turnerbund Heidenheim 1902 whose history was as a worker's club. TB was established on 21 December 1902 and was renamed Turnerbund Heidenheim on 6 August 1904. This club merged with Arbeiterturnverein 1904 Heidenheim on 8 March 1919. Like other worker's clubs, TB was considered as politically unacceptable by the Nazi regime and was forcibly dissolved in 1933. It was re-established after the war and on 3 February 1946 joined TSV 1846 Heidenheim to form TSB 1846 Heidenheim.

The 27 May 1972 merger of TSB and VfL brought all these threads together, returning the footballers to the fold of the original gymnastics club. Heidenheimer SB and predecessor VfL Heidenheim played in the Amateurliga Württemberg (III) from 1963 to 1975 and again from 1976 to 1979. Regional cup wins led to the team's participation in the opening round of the DFB-Pokal (German Cup) in 1975, 1978, and 1980, before the side slipped into lower-level competition.

The club has since recovered and in 2004 advanced to the Oberliga Baden-Württemberg. In 2007, the football department decided to split off from Heidenheimer SB as a legally independent club with retrospective effect from 1 January 2007. A successful season finish in 2008 saw the club being promoted to the Regionalliga Süd. Having simultaneously won the Württemberg Cup, Heidenheim was allowed to participate in the first round of the DFB-Pokal in the following season, where the team lost 0–3 to VfL Wolfsburg. In 2009, Heidenheim finished first in the Regionalliga Süd and got promoted to the 3. Liga.

After five seasons in the 3. Liga with the club always finishing in the upper half of the table, 1. FC Heidenheim won the league in 2013–14, and earned promotion to the 2. Bundesliga for the first time. At the same time the club, however, withdrew its reserve team, playing in the Oberliga Baden-Württemberg, from competition after such teams ceased to be compulsory for professional clubs.

In the 2019–20 season, 1. FC Heidenheim finished third to play against the 16th-placed Bundesliga club, Werder Bremen, in the promotion-relegation play-offs. The tie ended in a 2–2 draw on aggregate, as 1. FC Heidenheim lost on the away goals rule to stay in 2. Bundesliga.

On the final matchday of the 2022–23 season, 1. FC Heidenheim managed to score two goals in the stoppage time to win 3–2 against Jahn Regensburg, in which they finished top of the table ahead of Darmstadt on goal difference and promoted to the Bundesliga for the first time in their history.

On 17 September 2023, the club won their first ever Bundesliga match, in a 4–2 home victory against Werder Bremen, on the same day that head coach, Frank Schmidt, set the record as the longest serving manager in the history of German football. An impressive Bundesliga campaign saw the club finish 8th in the 2023–24 season, comfortably securing safety, and with German champions Bayer Leverkusen's victory over Kaiserslautern in the DFB-Pokal final meant that Heidenheim qualified for their first European appearance, the UEFA Conference League play-offs in their debut Bundesliga season. On 29 August 2024, Heidenheim advanced to the Conference League League Phase for the first time in history after defeating Swedish club BK Häcken 3–2 at home and 5–3 on aggregate in the play-off round.

In the 2025–26 season, Heidenheim were relegated to the 2. Bundesliga after a 2-0 defeat to Mainz on the final matchday.

== Honours ==
The club's honours:

=== League ===
- 2. Bundesliga
  - Champions: 2022–23
- 3. Liga
  - Champions: 2013–14
- Regionalliga Süd (IV)
  - Champions: 2008–09
- Oberliga Baden-Württemberg
  - Runners-up: 2006^{‡}
  - Fourth place, promoted: 2008
- Verbandsliga Württemberg
  - Champions: 2013^{#}

=== Cup ===
- Württemberg Cup
  - Winners: 1965^{†}, 2008, 2011, 2012, 2013, 2014
  - Runners-up: 1977^{‡}, 2005^{‡}

- ^{‡} Won by SB Heidenheim.
- ^{†} Won by VfL Heidenheim.
- ^{#} Won by reserve team.

== Players ==
=== Current squad ===
As of 3 September 2026

Note: Flags indicate national team as defined under FIFA eligibility rules; some limited exceptions apply. Players may hold more than one non-FIFA nationality.

No.	Pos.	Nation	Player
1	GK	GER	Frank Feller
2	DF	GER	Marnon Busch (vice-captain)
3	MF	GER	Jan Schöppner
4	DF	GER	Tim Siersleben
6	DF	GER	Patrick Mainka (captain)
8	MF	GER	Paul Hennrich
10	MF	GER	Christian Conteh
11	FW	GEO	Budu Zivzivadze
14	FW	GER	Maximilian Breunig
16	MF	GER	Julian Niehues
17	MF	AUT	Mathias Honsak
18	FW	SUI	Alessandro Vogt (on loan from TSG Hoffenheim)
19	DF	GER	Jonas Föhrenbach

No.	Pos.	Nation	Player
20	MF	GER	Luca Kerber
22	DF	MAR	Oualid Mhamdi
23	DF	KOS	Leart Paçarada
24	FW	GER	Marcel Costly
27	DF	SUI	Michael Heule
28	DF	GER	Adam Kölle
29	FW	DEN	Mikkel Kaufmann
31	MF	GER	Sirlord Conteh
33	GK	GER	Thomas Dähne
34	GK	AUT	Paul Tschernuth
38	FW	GER	Yannik Wagner
40	GK	GER	Felix Mark
41	MF	CRO	Marko Zrilić

=== Out on loan ===
Note: Flags indicate national team as defined under FIFA eligibility rules; some limited exceptions apply. Players may hold more than one non-FIFA nationality.

No.	Pos.	Nation	Player
—	MF	GER	Adrian Beck (at VfL Osnabrück until 30 June 2027)
—	MF	GER	Luka Janeš (at Tasmania Berlin until 30 June 2027)

No.	Pos.	Nation	Player
—	MF	GER	Nick Rothweiler (at Hessen Kassel until 30 June 2027)

== Non-playing staff ==
Position	Name
Head coach	(Germany) Frank Schmidt
Assistant coach	(Germany) Bernhard Raab (Germany) Dieter Jarosch
Goalkeeper coach	(Germany) Bernd Weng
Athletic trainer	(Germany) Said Lakhal (Germany) Tobias Häußler
Team doctor	(Germany) Andreas Heintzen
Medical department	(Germany) Dr. Udo Tiefenbacher
Physiotherapist	(Germany) Marc Weiss (Germany) Roland Bosch
Team manager	(Germany) Alexander Raaf
Kit manager	(Germany) Manuel Henck

== Recent managers ==
Recent managers of the club:

Manager	Start	Finish
Dieter Märkle	1 July 2006	17 September 2007
Frank Schmidt	17 September 2007	Present

== Recent seasons ==
The recent season-by-season performance of the club:

=== 1. FC Heidenheim ===
Season	Division	Tier	Position
1998–99	Verbandsliga Württemberg	VI	3rd
1999–2000	Verbandsliga Württemberg	VI	5th
2000–01	Verbandsliga Württemberg	VI	10th
2001–02	Verbandsliga Württemberg	VI	8th
2002–03	Verbandsliga Württemberg	VI	2nd
2003–04	Verbandsliga Württemberg	VI	2nd ↑
2004–05	Oberliga Baden-Württemberg	V	5th
2005–06	Oberliga Baden-Württemberg	V	2nd
2006–07	Oberliga Baden-Württemberg	V	3rd
2007–08	Oberliga Baden-Württemberg	V	4th ↑
2008–09	Regionalliga Süd	IV	1st ↑
2009–10	3. Liga	III	6th
2010–11	3. Liga	III	9th
2011–12	3. Liga	III	4th
2012–13	3. Liga	III	5th
2013–14	3. Liga	III	1st ↑
2014–15	2. Bundesliga	II	8th
2015–16	2. Bundesliga	II	11th
2016–17	2. Bundesliga	II	6th
2017–18	2. Bundesliga	II	13th
2018–19	2. Bundesliga	II	5th
2019–20	2. Bundesliga	II	3rd
2020–21	2. Bundesliga	II	8th
2021–22	2. Bundesliga	II	6th
2022–23	2. Bundesliga	II	1st ↑
2023–24	Bundesliga	I	8th
2024–25	Bundesliga	I	16th
2025–26	Bundesliga	I	17th ↓
2026–27	2. Bundesliga	II	

=== 1. FC Heidenheim II ===
Season	Division	Tier	Position
1999–2000			
2000–01			
2001–02			
2002–03			
2003–04	Bezirksliga Kocher/Rems	VII	9th
2004–05	Bezirksliga Kocher/Rems	VII	2nd
2005–06	Bezirksliga Kocher/Rems	VII	10th
2006–07	Bezirksliga Kocher/Rems	VII	1st ↑
2007–08	Landesliga Württemberg 2	VI	12th
2008–09	Landesliga Württemberg 2	VII	3rd
2009–10	Landesliga Württemberg 2	VII	1st ↑
2010–11	Verbandsliga Württemberg	VI	7th
2011–12	Verbandsliga Württemberg	VI	4th
2012–13	Verbandsliga Württemberg	VI	1st ↑
2013–14	Oberliga Baden-Württemberg	V	12th
2014–present	withdrawn from competition		

- With the introduction of the Regionalligas in 1994 and the 3. Liga in 2008 as the new third tier, below the 2. Bundesliga, all leagues below dropped one tier.

Key

↑ Promoted	↓ Relegated

== European record ==
=== UEFA club competition record ===
Accurate as of 20 February 2025

UEFA competitions
Competition	Pld	W	D	L	GF	GA	Last season played
UEFA Conference League	10	6	1	3	15	14	2024–25
Total	10	6	1	3	15	14	—N/a

=== Matches ===
All results (home and away) list 1. FC Heidenheim's goal tally first.

Season	Competition	Round	Opponent	Home	Away	Aggregate
2024–25	UEFA Conference League	Play-off round	(Sweden) BK Häcken	2–1	3–2	5–3
2024–25	UEFA Conference League	League phase	(Slovenia) Olimpija Ljubljana	2–1	—N/a	16th out of 36
2024–25	UEFA Conference League	League phase	(Cyprus) Pafos	—N/a	1–0	16th out of 36
2024–25	UEFA Conference League	League phase	(Scotland) Heart of Midlothian	—N/a	2–0	16th out of 36
2024–25	UEFA Conference League	League phase	(England) Chelsea	0–2	—N/a	16th out of 36
2024–25	UEFA Conference League	League phase	(Turkey) İstanbul Başakşehir	—N/a	1–3	16th out of 36
2024–25	UEFA Conference League	League phase	(Switzerland) St. Gallen	1–1	—N/a	16th out of 36
2024–25	UEFA Conference League	Knockout phase play-offs	(Denmark) Copenhagen	1–3 (a.e.t.)	2–1	3–4

=== UEFA Club Ranking ===
UEFA coefficient

As of 1 May 2026

Rank	Team	Points
109	(Croatia) HNK Rijeka	18.625
110	(Germany) Mainz 05	18.466
111	(Germany) 1. FC Heidenheim	18.466
112	(Germany) TSG Hoffenheim	18.466
113	(Germany) 1. FC Köln	18.466

== Stadium ==
Since June 1973, the team has played in the Albstadion which has a capacity of 8,000. Since the extension in 2009, the stadium is now called Voith-Arena and accommodates 10,000 visitors. Following another extension in 2013 the stadium holds 13,000 visitors. At the beginning of 2015, another extension was added increasing capacity to 15,000.
