= Alp (name) =

- Gender: Male

Origin
- Origin: Turkic
- Meaning: Hero

Other names
- Variant forms: Alper, Alperen, Alparslan, Alpay, Gökalp, Konuralp
- Related names: Alparslan, Alpay, Alper

Alp is a Turkish masculine name meaning hero, brave, warrior. It has been used as a title, a given name, and a surname. The name is also used in compound names and has many varieties.

In Proto-Turkic, it was a title used for both men and women. In the Khakas Turkic epic "Khuban Arig", this title represents being brave, valiant, and also having shamanic skills. Alps can travel between the worlds (middleworld, underworld, upperworld), talk with animals, and commune with the spirits of nature.

Notable people with the name include:

== Given name ==
- Alp Ikizler, American nephrologist of Turkish origin
- Alp Iluetuer (fl. 680s), vassal ruler of the North Caucasian Huns
- Alp Kırşan (born 1979), Turkish actor
- Alp Khan (died c. 1315), general and governor of Gujarat
- Alp Mehmet (born 1948), British former diplomat
- Alp Ozkilic, (born 1986), Turkish-American mixed martial artist
- Alp Tarkhan (8th century), Khazar general
- Alp Tigin (died 963), Turkic slave commander of the Samanid Empire and governor of Ghazna
- Alp Yalman (born 1940), Turkish businessman
- Alp Navruz (born 1990), Turkish Actor

== Surname ==
- Ahmet Vefik Alp (1948–2021), Turkish architect and urbanist
- Çetin Alp (1947–2004), Turkish pop music singer
- Chris Alp (fl. 1980), Australian Paralympic athlete
- Hüseyin Alp (1935–1983), Turkish basketball player and actor
- Kaya Alp (died 1214), Baig of the Kayı tribe
- Kelvyn Alp (born 1971), New Zealand politician and activist
- Nejat Alp (born 1952), Turkish musician who plays synth-driven Turkish ambient folk
- Orhan Alp (1919–2010), Turkish mechanical engineer, politician and government minister
- Sedat Alp (1913–2006), first archaeologist in Turkey with a specialization in Hittitology
- Turgut Alp, one of the early Gazis of the Ottoman Empire

== As a title ==
- Alp Er Tunga

== See also ==
- ALP (disambiguation)
- Alper
- Alparslan (disambiguation)
