= 2019–20 1. FC Heidenheim season =

1. FC Heidenheim
2019–20 season
- President: Klaus Mayer
- Head coach: Frank Schmidt
- Stadium: Voith-Arena
- Bundesliga: 3rd (lost in promotion play-offs)
- DFB-Pokal: Second round
- Top goalscorer: League: Tim Kleindienst (14); All: Tim Kleindienst (16)
Home colours	Away colours	Third colours

The 2019–20 1. FC Heidenheim season was the 6th consecutive season in the 2. Bundesliga, the second division of German football, played by 1. FC Heidenheim, a football club based in Heidenheim an der Brenz, Baden-Württemberg, Germany. In addition to the 2. Bundesliga, Heidenheim also participated in the DFB-Pokal. The club played their home matches at the Voith-Arena.

== Players ==
As of end of season

=== First-team squad ===
Note: Flags indicate national team as defined under FIFA eligibility rules; some limited exceptions apply. Players may hold more than one non-FIFA nationality.

No.	Pos.	Nation	Player
1	GK	GER	Kevin Müller
2	DF	GER	Marnon Busch
5	DF	GER	Oliver Hüsing
6	DF	GER	Patrick Mainka
7	MF	GER	Marc Schnatterer
9	FW	GER	Stefan Schimmer
10	FW	GER	Tim Kleindienst
11	FW	GER	Denis Thomalla
13	FW	GER	Robert Leipertz
16	MF	GER	Kevin Sessa
17	MF	GER	Maurice Multhaup
18	MF	GER	Sebastian Griesbeck
19	DF	GER	Jonas Föhrenbach
21	MF	GER	Maximilian Thiel

No.	Pos.	Nation	Player
22	GK	GER	Vitus Eicher
24	MF	GER	Tobias Mohr
26	FW	GER	David Otto (on loan from TSG 1899 Hoffenheim)
27	MF	AUT	Konstantin Kerschbaumer
28	DF	GER	Arne Feick
29	DF	GER	Robert Strauß
30	MF	GER	Norman Theuerkauf
31	MF	GER	Jonas Brändle
33	DF	GER	Timo Beermann
35	MF	GER	Andrew Owusu
36	MF	GER	Niklas Dorsch
39	GK	GER	Kevin Ibrahim
40	GK	GER	Diant Ramaj

=== Left club during season ===
Note: Flags indicate national team as defined under FIFA eligibility rules; some limited exceptions apply. Players may hold more than one non-FIFA nationality.

No.	Pos.	Nation	Player
4	DF	GER	Oliver Steurer (on loan at SC Preußen Münster)
9	FW	GER	Robert Glatzel (signed for Cardiff City in January 2020)
23	MF	GER	Merveille Biankadi (on loan at Eintracht Braunschweig)
27	MF	GER	Kolja Pusch (left club in September 2019)

No.	Pos.	Nation	Player
32	FW	GER	Patrick Schmidt (on loan at Dynamo Dresden)
34	DF	GER	Tobias Reithmeir (left club in September 2019)
37	MF	GER	Gökalp Kılıç (on loan at SSV Ulm 1846)

== Transfers ==
=== Transfers in ===
Date	Position	Name	From	Fee	Ref.
1 July 2019	DF	Jonas Föhrenbach	SC Freiburg	Undisclosed	
1 July 2019	DF	Oliver Hüsing	Hansa Rostock	Free	
17 July 2019	MF	Merveille Biankadi	Hansa Rostock	Undisclosed	
6 August 2019	FW	Stefan Schimmer	Unterhaching	Undisclosed	
2 September 2019	FW	Tim Kleindienst	SC Freiburg	Undisclosed	
2 September 2019	MF	Konstantin Kerschbaumer	FC Ingolstadt 04	Undisclosed	
10 January 2020	MF	Tobias Mohr	Greuther Fürth	Undisclosed	

=== Loans in ===
Date	Position	Name	From	Date until	Ref.
1 July 2019	FW	David Otto	1899 Hoffenheim	7 July 2020	

=== Transfers out ===
Date	Position	Name	To	Fee	Ref.
1 July 2019	MF	Nikola Dovedan	1. FC Nürnberg	Undisclosed	
1 July 2019	MF	Robert Andrich	1. FC Union Berlin	Undisclosed	
1 July 2019	MF	Tim Skarke	SV Darmstadt 98	Undisclosed	
1 July 2019	GK	Matthias Köbbing	FC Homburg	Free	
31 July 2019	FW	Robert Glatzel	(Wales) Cardiff City	€6,000,000	
2 September 2019	MF	Kolja Pusch	(Austria) Admira Wacker	Free	
2 September 2019	DF	Tobias Reithmeir	Austria Lustenau	Free	

=== Loans out ===
Date	Position	Name	To	Date until	Ref.
2 September 2019	MF	Gökalp Kılıç	SSV Ulm	30 June 2020	
12 August 2019	DF	Oliver Steurer	KFC Uerdingen	19 January 2020	
3 January 2020	FW	Patrick Schmidt	1. FC Heidenheim	30 June 2020	
19 January 2020	DF	Oliver Steurer	Preußen Münster	5 July 2020	
23 January 2020	MF	Merveille Biankadi	Eintracht Braunschweig	5 July 2020	

== Friendly matches ==
Win Draw Loss

22 June 2019 Friendly	FC Mengen	2–13	1. FC Heidenheim	Mengen, Germany
16:00 CEST (UTC+2)	Ivanesic 59'; Xhemaili 87'	Heidenheim report kicker Report	Thomalla 4'; Griesbeck 18'; Thiel 31', 39'; Sessa 40'; Otto 45'; Schmidt 47', 69', 77', 82'; Dovedan 51', 56'; Leipertz 79'	Stadium: Ablachstadion; Attendance: 1,350

9 July 2019 Friendly	Union Gurten	1–4	1. FC Heidenheim	Wien, Austria
18:00 CEST (UTC+2)	90+4'	Report	Kılıç 40'; Glatzel 62', 82'; Leipertz 87' (pen.)	Stadium: Profi Arena Rohrbach-Berg; Attendance: 120

13 July 2019 Friendly	LASK	1–1	1. FC Heidenheim	Pasching, Austria
15:30 CEST (UTC+2)	Tetteh 53'	Report	Hüsing 33'	Stadium: Waldstadion; Attendance: 1,500

20 July 2019 Friendly	1. FC Heidenheim	5–1	Middlesbrough	Heidenheim an der Brenz, Germany
16:00 CEST (UTC+2)	Glatzel 66', 70', 89'; Beermann 74'; Pusch 87'	Report	Busch 19' (o.g.)	Stadium: Voith-Arena; Attendance: 3,500; Referee: Pascal Müller

10 October 2019 Friendly	Sonnenhof Großaspach	0–2	1. FC Heidenheim	Aspach, Germany
17:00 CEST (UTC+2)		Report	Thomalla 45'; Biankadi 89'	Stadium: Mechatronik Arena; Attendance: 100; Referee: Lars Erbst

14 November 2019 Friendly	1. FC Heidenheim	3–2	Würzburger Kickers	Heidenheim an der Brenz, Germany
17:00 CET (UTC+1)	Biankadi 29'; Mainka 57', 79'	Report	Rhein 32', 35'; Kaufmann (yellow card) 79'	Stadium: Voith-Arena; Attendance: 350; Referee: Markus Schmidt

9 January 2020 Friendly	1. FC Heidenheim	2–1	SpVgg Unterhaching	Heidenheim an der Brenz, Germany
14:00 CET (UTC+1)	Schimmer 43'; Feick 90'	Report	Hain 86'	Stadium: Voith-Arena; Attendance: 350; Referee: Asmir Osmanagic

14 January 2020 Friendly	Lugano	2–4	1. FC Heidenheim	Murcia, Spain
15:00 CET (UTC+1)	Holender 18'; Bottani 21'	Report	Schnatterer 6'; Mohr 13'; Leipertz 27'; Stark 66'	Stadium: Pinatar Arena Football Center; Attendance: 100

18 January 2020 Friendly	1. FC Heidenheim	5–2	Beijing Sinobo Guoan	Algorfa, Spain
15:00 CET (UTC+1)	Kleindienst 15'; Kerschbaumer 21'; Schimmer 68'; Feick 74'; Otto 89'	Report	Augusto 50', 70'	Stadium: La Finca Resort; Attendance: 100

22 January 2020 Friendly	1. FC Heidenheim	3–0	Austria Lustenau	Heidenheim an der Brenz, Germany
14:00 CET (UTC+1)	Kleindienst 26'; Leipertz 64'; Thomalla 81'	Report		Stadium: Voith-Arena; Attendance: 270; Referee: Markus Schmidt

== Competitions ==
=== Overview ===
Competition	First match	Last match	Starting round	Final position	Record							
Competition	First match	Last match	Starting round	Final position	Pld	W	D	L	GF	GA	GD	Win %
2. Bundesliga	27 July 2019	28 June 2020	Matchday 1	3rd	34	15	10	9	45	36	+9	44.12
Bundesliga relegation play-offs	2 July 2020	6 July 2020	First leg	Runners-up	2	0	2	0	2	2	+0	0.00
DFB-Pokal	10 August 2019	30 October 2019	First round	Second round	2	1	0	1	3	4	−1	50.00
Total					38	16	12	10	50	42	+8	42.11

Last updated: 6 July 2020
Source: Soccerway

=== Bundesliga ===
==== League table ====
Pos	Team	Pld	W	D	L	GF	GA	GD	Pts	Promotion, qualification or relegation
1	Arminia Bielefeld (C, P)	34	18	14	2	65	30	+35	68	Promotion to Bundesliga
2	VfB Stuttgart (P)	34	17	7	10	62	41	+21	58	Promotion to Bundesliga
3	1. FC Heidenheim	34	15	10	9	45	36	+9	55	Qualification for promotion play-offs
4	Hamburger SV	34	14	12	8	62	46	+16	54	
5	Darmstadt 98	34	13	13	8	48	43	+5	52	

Source: DFB
Rules for classification: 1) Points; 2) Goal difference; 3) Goals scored; 4) Head-to-head points; 5) Head-to-head goal difference; 6) Head-to-head away goals scored; 7) Away goals scored; 8) Play-off.
(C) Champions; (P) Promoted

==== Results summary ====
Overall								Home						Away					
Pld	W	D	L	GF	GA	GD	Pts	W	D	L	GF	GA	GD	W	D	L	GF	GA	GD
34	15	10	9	45	36	+9	55	11	4	2	32	13	+19	4	6	7	13	23	−10

Last updated: 28 June 2020.

==== Results by round ====
Matchday	1	2	3	4	5	6	7	8	9	10	11	12	13	14	15	16	17	18	19	20	21	22	23	24	25	26	27	28	29	30	31	32	33	34
Ground	A	H	A	H	A	H	H	A	H	A	H	A	H	A	H	A	H	H	A	H	A	H	A	A	H	A	H	A	H	A	H	A	H	A
Result	W	D	L	L	D	W	W	D	L	D	W	D	W	L	W	W	D	W	L	D	W	D	W	L	W	L	W	D	W	L	W	D	W	L
Position	1	4	9	12	11	9	4	5	7	7	5	6	4	6	4	4	4	4	4	5	4	4	4	4	4	4	4	4	4	4	4	4	3	3

Updated to match(es) played on 28 June 2020. Source:
A = Away; H = Home; W = Win; D = Draw; L = Loss

==== Matches ====
27 July 2019 1	VfL Osnabrück	1–3	1. FC Heidenheim	Osnabrück
15:30 CEST (UTC+2)	Ouahim 58'; Wolze (yellow card) 64' (red card) 83'	Report	Griesbeck 74'; Leipertz 89'; Otto 90+4'	Stadium: Stadion an der Bremer Brücke; Attendance: 12,909; Referee: Sascha Stegemann

4 August 2019 2	1. FC Heidenheim	2–2	VfB Stuttgart	Heidenheim an der Brenz
13:30 CEST (UTC+2)	Leipertz 78'; Kempf 84' (o.g.)	Report	Al Ghaddioui 52'; Badstuber 57'	Stadium: Voith-Arena; Attendance: 15,000; Referee: Benjamin Cortus

18 August 2019 3	Dynamo Dresden	2–1	1. FC Heidenheim	Dresden
13:30 CEST (UTC+2)	Ebert 68'; Jeremejeff 82'	Report	Thomalla 89' (pen.)	Stadium: Rudolf-Harbig-Stadion; Attendance: 26,350; Referee: Patrick Alt

25 August 2019 4	1. FC Heidenheim	0–2	SV Sandhausen	Heidenheim an der Brenz
13:30 CEST (UTC+2)		Report	Förster 60' (pen.); Behrens 63'	Stadium: Voith-Arena; Attendance: 10,500; Referee: Frank Willenborg

30 August 2019 5	1. FC Nürnberg	2–2	1. FC Heidenheim	Nuremberg
18:30 CEST (UTC+2)	Dovedan 30'; Geis 70'	Report	Dorsch 82'; Schimmer 84'	Stadium: Max-Morlock-Stadion; Attendance: 27,444; Referee: Florian Heft

14 September 2019 6	1. FC Heidenheim	3–0	Holstein Kiel	Heidenheim an der Brenz
13:00 CEST (UTC+2)	Leipertz 3'; Kleindienst 29', 55'	Report		Stadium: Voith-Arena; Attendance: 10,800; Referee: Nicolas Winter

20 September 2019 7	1. FC Heidenheim	1–0	SV Darmstadt 98	Heidenheim an der Brenz
18:30 CEST (UTC+2)	Leipertz 59'	Report		Stadium: Voith-Arena; Attendance: 10,800; Referee: Florian Badstübner

28 September 2019 8	Karlsruher SC	1–1	1. FC Heidenheim	Karlsruhe
13:00 CEST (UTC+2)	Hofmann 21'	Report	Schnatterer 54'	Stadium: Wildparkstadion; Attendance: 12,713; Referee: Bastian Dankert

6 October 2019 9	1. FC Heidenheim	2–3	VfL Bochum	Heidenheim an der Brenz
13:30 CEST (UTC+2)	Leipertz 23'; Schimmer 90+3'	Report	Zoller 7'; Blum 14'; Ganvoula 49'	Stadium: Voith-Arena; Attendance: 10,350; Referee: Michael Bacher

19 October 2019 10	Wehen Wiesbaden	0–0	1. FC Heidenheim	Wiesbaden
13:00 CEST (UTC+2)		Report		Stadium: Brita-Arena; Attendance: 5,023; Referee: Alexander Sather

27 October 2019 11	1. FC Heidenheim	1–0	FC St. Pauli	Heidenheim an der Brenz
13:30 CET (UTC+1)	Theuerkauf 59'	Report		Stadium: Voith-Arena; Attendance: 13,500; Referee: Martin Thomsen

2 November 2019 12	Erzgebirge Aue	1–1	1. FC Heidenheim	Aue
13:00 CET (UTC+1)	Riese 54'	Report	Schimmer 88'	Stadium: Erzgebirgsstadion; Attendance: 8,700; Referee: Florian Heft

10 November 2019 13	1. FC Heidenheim	4–0	Hannover 96	Heidenheim an der Brenz
13:30 CET (UTC+1)	Kleindienst 3', 49'; Schnatterer 53' (pen.); Griesbeck 70'	Report	Franke (red card) 51'	Stadium: Voith-Arena; Attendance: 11,100; Referee: Lasse Koslowski

24 November 2019 14	SSV Jahn Regensburg	3–1	1. FC Heidenheim	Regensburg
13:30 CET (UTC+1)	Knipping 45+1'; Albers 74'; George 85'	Report	Multhaup 62'	Stadium: Arena Regensburg; Attendance: 11,762; Referee: Felix Zwayer

1 December 2019 15	1. FC Heidenheim	1–0	SpVgg Greuther Fürth	Heidenheim an der Brenz
13:30 CET (UTC+1)	Kleindienst 63'	Report		Stadium: Voith-Arena; Attendance: 10,700; Referee: Frank Willenborg

6 December 2019 16	Hamburger SV	0–1	1. FC Heidenheim	Hamburg
18:30 CET (UTC+1)		Report	Föhrenbach 82'	Stadium: Volksparkstadion; Attendance: 42,190; Referee: Felix Brych

14 December 2019 17	1. FC Heidenheim	0–0	Arminia Bielefeld	Heidenheim an der Brenz
13:00 CET (UTC+1)		Report		Stadium: Voith-Arena; Attendance: 11,200; Referee: Tobias Stieler

22 December 2019 18	1. FC Heidenheim	3–1	VfL Osnabrück	Heidenheim an der Brenz
13:30 CET (UTC+1)	Leipertz 21'; Kleindienst 66', 89'	Report	Henning 75'	Stadium: Voith-Arena; Attendance: 12,100; Referee: Michael Bacher

29 January 2020 19	VfB Stuttgart	3–0	1. FC Heidenheim	Stuttgart
18:30 CET (UTC+1)	Kempf 32'; González 76'; Gómez 86'	Report		Stadium: Mercedes-Benz Arena; Attendance: 52,585; Referee: Florian Badstübner

2 February 2020 20	1. FC Heidenheim	0–0	Dynamo Dresden	Heidenheim an der Brenz
13:30 CET (UTC+1)		Report		Stadium: Voith-Arena; Attendance: 12,150; Referee: Thorben Siewer

7 February 2020 21	SV Sandhausen	0–1	1. FC Heidenheim	Sandhausen
18:30 CET (UTC+1)		Report	Kleindienst 16'	Stadium: BWT-Stadion am Hardtwald; Attendance: 4,726; Referee: Nicolas Winter

14 February 2020 22	1. FC Heidenheim	2–2	1. FC Nürnberg	Heidenheim an der Brenz
18:30 CET (UTC+1)	Kleindienst 45', 83'	Report	Dovedan 1'; Behrens 62'	Stadium: Voith-Arena; Attendance: 13,600; Referee: Timo Gerach

22 February 2020 23	Holstein Kiel	0–1	1. FC Heidenheim	Kiel
13:00 CET (UTC+1)		Report	Theuerkauf 77'	Stadium: Holstein-Stadion; Attendance: 8,000; Referee: Robert Kempter

29 February 2020 24	SV Darmstadt 98	2–0	1. FC Heidenheim	Darmstadt
13:00 CET (UTC+1)	Dursun 11'; Honsak 16'	Report	Hüsing (red card) 90'	Stadium: Merck-Stadion am Böllenfalltor; Attendance: 13,020; Referee: Sven Waschitzki

7 March 2020 25	1. FC Heidenheim	3–1	Karlsruher SC	Heidenheim an der Brenz
13:00 CET (UTC+1)	Kerschbaumer 22'; Kleindienst 37', 45+1'	Report	Kobald 54'; Ben-Hatira (red card) 90+2'	Stadium: Voith-Arena; Attendance: 12,050; Referee: Christian Dingert

16 May 2020 26	VfL Bochum	3–0	1. FC Heidenheim	Bochum
13:00 CEST (UTC+2)	Losilla 11'; Osei-Tutu 34'; Ganvoula 64'	Report		Stadium: Vonovia-Ruhrstadion; Attendance: 0 (Note: Match played behind closed doors); Referee: Florian Heft

22 May 2020 27	1. FC Heidenheim	1–0	SV Wehen Wiesbaden	Heidenheim an der Brenz
18:30 CEST (UTC+2)	Mohr 70'	Report		Stadium: Voith-Arena; Attendance: 0 Referee: Timo Gerach

27 May 2020 28	FC St. Pauli	0–0	1. FC Heidenheim	St. Pauli
18:30 CEST (UTC+2)		Report		Stadium: Millerntor-Stadion; Attendance: 0 Referee: Lasse Koslowski

31 May 2020 29	1. FC Heidenheim	3–0	Erzgebirge Aue	Heidenheim an der Brenz
13:30 CEST (UTC+2)	Schnatterer (penalty missed) 24'; Rizzuto 48' (o.g.); Busch (yellow card) 56'; Kerschbaumer 58'; Schimmer 86'	Report	Rizzuto (yellow card) 23'; Rasmussen (yellow card) 45'; Riese (yellow card) 90+1'	Stadium: Voith-Arena; Attendance: 0 Referee: Robert Kempter

7 June 2020 30	Hannover 96	2–1	1. FC Heidenheim	Hanover
13:30 CEST (UTC+2)	Ducksch 30'; Prib 41'	Report	Schimmer 75'	Stadium: HDI-Arena; Attendance: 0 Referee: Felix Zwayer

13 June 2020 31	1. FC Heidenheim	4–1	SSV Jahn Regensburg	Heidenheim an der Brenz
13:00 CEST (UTC+2)	Leipertz 2'; Kleindienst 65', 81'; Schimmer 86'	Report	Seydel 75'	Stadium: Voith-Arena; Attendance: 0 Referee: Felix Brych

16 June 2020 32	SpVgg Greuther Fürth	0–0	1. FC Heidenheim	Fürth
18:30 CEST (UTC+2)		Report		Stadium: Sportpark Ronhof Thomas Sommer; Attendance: 0 Referee: Michael Bacher

21 June 2020 33	1. FC Heidenheim	2–1	Hamburger SV	Heidenheim an der Brenz
13:30 CEST (UTC+2)	Griesbeck (yellow card) 39'; Thomalla (yellow card) 65'; Beyer 80' (o.g.); Kerschbaumer 90+5'	Report	Jung (yellow card) 23'; Pohjanpalo 46'; Beyer (yellow card) 90+2'; Pollersbeck (yellow card) 90+4'	Stadium: Voith-Arena; Attendance: 0 Referee: Deniz Aytekin

28 June 2020 34	Arminia Bielefeld	3–0	1. FC Heidenheim	Bielefeld
15:30 CEST (UTC+2)	Klos 13'; Voglsammer 17'; Clauss 53'	Report		Stadium: Bielefelder Alm; Attendance: 0 Referee: Manuel Gräfe

==== Relegation play-offs ====
As a result of their third place finish in the regular season, the club qualified for the play-off match with the 16th-place team in the 2019–20 Bundesliga to determine whether the club would be promoted to the 2020–21 Bundesliga.

2 July 2020 First leg	Werder Bremen	0–0	1. FC Heidenheim	Bremen
20:30 CEST (UTC+2)	Moisander (yellow card) 17' (yellow-red card) 87'; Osako (yellow card) 34'; Bittencourt (yellow card) 71'	Report	Multhaup (yellow card) 35'; Beermann (yellow card) 75'	Stadium: Weser-Stadion; Attendance: 0 Referee: Felix Zwayer

6 July 2020 Second leg	1. FC Heidenheim	2–2 (2–2 (a) agg.)	Werder Bremen	Heidenheim
20:30 CEST (UTC+2)	Dorsch (yellow card) 60'; Multhaup (yellow card) 81'; Kleindienst 85', 90+7' (pen.)	Report	Theuerkauf 3' (o.g.); Augustinsson (yellow card) 90+2', (goal) 90+4'; Klaassen (yellow card) 90+2'	Stadium: Voith-Arena; Attendance: 0 Referee: Felix Brych

=== DFB-Pokal ===
10 August 2019 First round	SSV Ulm	0–2	1. FC Heidenheim	Ulm
18:30 CEST (UTC+2)		Report	Leipertz 7'; Schnatterer 71' (pen.)	Stadium: Donaustadion; Attendance: 19,000; Referee: Florian Badstübner

30 October 2019 Second round	Werder Bremen	4–1	1. FC Heidenheim	Bremen
18:30 CET (UTC+1)	Rashica 6'; Bittencourt 11'; Klaassen 18'; Friedl 40', (yellow card) 45'; Philipp Bargfrede (yellow card) 58'; Osako (yellow card) 82'	Report	Schnatterer 45+1' (pen.)	Stadium: Weser-Stadion; Attendance: 40,000; Referee: Daniel Schlager

== Player statistics ==
=== Appearances and goals ===
No.	Pos	Nat	Player	Total		2. Bundesliga		DFB-Pokal		Play-offs	
No.	Pos	Nat	Player	Apps	Goals	Apps	Goals	Apps	Goals	Apps	Goals
1	GK	(Germany) GER	Kevin Müller	36	0	33	0	1	0	2	0
2	DF	(Germany) GER	Marnon Busch	37	0	32+1	0	2	0	2	0
5	DF	(Germany) GER	Oliver Hüsing	20	0	17+2	0	1	0	0	0
6	DF	(Germany) GER	Patrick Mainka	36	0	32	0	2	0	2	0
7	MF	(Germany) GER	Marc Schnatterer	35	4	26+5	2	2	2	1+1	0
9	FW	(Germany) GER	Stefan Schimmer	25	6	1+21	6	0+2	0	0+1	0
10	FW	(Germany) GER	Tim Kleindienst	29	16	27	14	0	0	2	2
11	FW	(Germany) GER	Denis Thomalla	16	1	6+8	1	0	0	2	0
13	FW	(Germany) GER	Robert Leipertz	35	8	22+10	7	2	1	1	0
16	MF	(Germany) GER	Kevin Sessa	5	0	0+2	0	1	0	1+1	0
17	MF	(Germany) GER	Maurice Multhaup	23	1	5+15	1	0+1	0	1+1	0
18	MF	(Germany) GER	Sebastian Griesbeck	33	2	29	2	2	0	2	0
19	DF	(Germany) GER	Jonas Föhrenbach	29	1	14+11	1	1+1	0	1+1	0
22	GK	(Germany) GER	Vitus Eicher	2	0	1	0	1	0	0	0
23	MF	(Democratic Republic of the Congo) COD	Merveille Biankadi	8	0	1+5	0	0+2	0	0	0
24	MF	(Germany) GER	Tobias Mohr	17	1	10+6	1	0	0	0+1	0
26	FW	(Germany) GER	David Otto	29	1	11+14	1	2	0	0+2	0
27	MF	(Germany) GER	Kolja Pusch	1	0	1	0	0	0	0	0
27	MF	(Austria) AUT	Konstantin Kerschbaumer	25	3	21+2	3	1	0	0+1	0
28	DF	(Germany) GER	Arne Feick	5	0	2+3	0	0	0	0	0
29	DF	(Germany) GER	Robert Strauß	4	0	2+2	0	0	0	0	0
30	MF	(Germany) GER	Norman Theuerkauf	34	2	28+4	2	0	0	2	0
32	FW	(Germany) GER	Patrick Schmidt	4	0	2+2	0	0	0	0	0
33	DF	(Germany) GER	Timo Beermann	23	0	19+2	0	1	0	1	0
36	MF	(Germany) GER	Niklas Dorsch	36	1	32	1	2	0	2	0

- Last updated: 6 July 2020
