= Özalp (given name) =

- Gender: Masculine
- Language: Turkish

Origin
- Origin: Alp
- Derivation: 1. öz 2. alp
- Meaning: 1. "soul", "nucleus", "self" 2. "stouthearted", "brave", "chivalrous", "daredevil", "valorous", "gallant"

Other names
- Anglicisation: Ozalp
- See also: Alp, Alparslan, Alper, Alpay, Özgür

Özalp is a masculine Turkish given name. The name is produced by using two Turkish words: öz and alp. In Turkish, öz means "soul", "nucleus", and/or "self" whereas alp means "stouthearted", "brave", "chivalrous", "daredevil", "valorous", and/or "gallant". Therefore, Özalp means "immanently gallant" or "inherently valorous".

Notable persons with the given name Özalp include:

- Özalp Babaoğlu, Turkish computer scientist
