= List of ambassadors to Estonia =

This is a list of ambassadors to Estonia. Note that some ambassadors are responsible for more than one country while others are directly accredited to Tallinn.

== Current Ambassadors to Estonia ==
Sending country	Presentation of the credentials	Location of resident embassy	Ambassador
Albania	21.02.2008	Warsaw, Poland	Florent Çeliku
Algeria	29.04.2010	Warsaw, Poland	Abdelkader Khemri
Andorra		Andorra la Vella, Andorra	Maria Noguer González (Chargé d'Affaires a.i.)
Angola	26.01.2012	Stockholm, Sweden	Brito Antonio Sozinho
Argentina	26.01.2012	Helsinki, Finland	Roberto Daniel Pierini
Armenia	22.05.2012	Vilnius, Lithuania	Ara Aivazian
Australia	27.03.2013	Stockholm, Sweden	Gerald Bruce Thomson
Austria	16.08.2011	Tallinn, Estonia	Renate Kobler
Azerbaijan	25.10.2010	Tallinn, Estonia	Tofig Zulfugarov
Bangladesh	29.04.2010	Moscow, Russia	Saiful Hoque
Belarus	20.07.2006	Tallinn, Estonia	Vadim Lazerko (Chargé d’Affaires a.i.)
Belgium	03.10.2010	Tallinn, Estonia	Marc Thunus
Benin	30.08.2012	Copenhagen, Denmark	Arlette Claudine Kpedetin Dagnon Vignikin
Bolivia		Stockholm, Sweden	vacant
Botswana		Stockholm, Sweden	Ishmael Tsholofelo Dabutha (Chargé d’Affaires a.i.)
Bosnia and Herzegovina	12.12.2012	Stockholm, Sweden	Jadranka Kalmeta
Brazil	28.09.2011	Tallinn, Estonia	Vergniaud Elyseu Filho
Bulgaria	30.01.2013	Helsinki, Finland	Lyubomir Todorov Todorov
Burkina Faso	26.03.2009	Copenhagen, Denmark	Monique Ilboudo
Cambodia	16.02.2011	Moscow, Russia	Vanna Thay
Canada	21.02.2012	Riga, Latvia	John Morrison
Chile	24.02.2009	Helsinki, Finland	Eduardo Tapia Riepel
China	24.04.2012	Tallinn, Estonia	Qu Zhe
Colombia	11.10.2012	Warsaw, Poland	Victoria González-Ariza
Costa Rica		Oslo, Norway	vacant
Croatia	12.12.2012	Helsinki, Finland	Krešimir Kopčić
Cuba	12.12.2012	Helsinki, Finland	Enrique Orta González
Cyprus	31.03.2011	Helsinki, Finland	Filippos Kritiotis
Czech Republic	17.09.2012	Tallinn, Estonia	Richard Kadlčák
Denmark	30.08.2012	Tallinn, Estonia	Søren Kelstrup
Ecuador	17.09.2012	Stockholm, Sweden	Mario Aníbal Guerrero Murgueytio
Egypt	26.01.2012	Stockholm, Sweden	Mohamed Abdel Hameed Kassem
El Salvador	10.11.2005	Stockholm, Sweden	Martin Alberto Rivera Gómez
Ethiopia	10.11.2012	,	Kassu Yilala
Finland	17.09.2010	Tallinn, Estonia	Heikki Aleksi Härkönen
France	29.10.2009	Tallinn, Estonia	Frédéric Billet
Georgia	28.05.2009	Tallinn, Estonia	Ruslan Abashidze
Germany	2025	Tallinn, Estonia	Jan Scheer
Ghana	28.09.2011	Berlin, Germany	Paul King Aryene
Greece		Tallinn, Estonia	Evaghelia Kamariotou (Chargé d’Affaires a.i.)
Guatemala		Stockholm, Sweden	Brenda Paz de Ghassemi (Chargé d’Affaires a.i.)
Guinea		Moscow, Russia	Mohamed Keita (Ambassador agrée)
Holy See	28.05.2009	Vilnius, Lithuania	Luigi Bonazzi
Honduras	30.01.2013	Stockholm, Sweden	Roberto Flores Bermúdez
Hungary	06.10.2011	Tallinn, Estonia	Erik Haupt
Iceland	22.03.2018	Helsinki, Finland	Árni Þór Sigurðsson
India	15.12.2010	Helsinki, Finland	Aladiyan Manickam
Indonesia	24.04.2012	Helsinki, Finland	Elias Ginting
Iran	27.05.2010	Helsinki, Finland	Seyed Rasoul Mousavi
Iraq	26.04,2011	Helsinki, Finland	Abdul Kareem Toma Mehdi Kaab
Ireland	25.08.2008	Tallinn, Estonia	Peter Kieran McIvor
Israel	23.10.2011	Tallinn, Estonia	Dan Ashbel
Italy	12.12.2012	Tallinn, Estonia	Marco Clemente
Japan	23.11.2012	Tallinn, Estonia	Tetsuro Kai
Jordan	25.05.2011	The Hague, Netherlands	Khaldoun Talhouni
Kazakhstan	05.03.2020	Vilnius, Lithuania	Nurlan Seitimov
Kosovo	06.10.2011	Brussels, Belgium	Ilir Dugolli
Kuwait	28.10.2010	Berlin, Germany	Musaed Rashed Ahmad Al-Haroun
Kyrgyzstan	06.08.2010	Minsk, Belarus	Erik Asanaliev
Laos	28.06.2012	Berlin, Germany	Khamvone Phanouvong
Latvia	28.08.2008	Tallinn, Estonia	Kārlis Eihenbaums
Lebanon		Warsaw, Poland	Sonia Abou Azar (Chargé d’Affaires a.i.)
Lithuania	23.11.2012	Tallinn, Estonia	Neilas Tankevičius
Luxembourg	23.11.2012	Prague, Czech Republic	Michèle Pranchère-Tomassini
Malawi	21.02.2012	Helsinki, Finland	Isaac Lamba
Malaysia	19.04.2011	Helsinki, Finland	Cheah Choong Kit
Mali		Berlin, Germany	Fatoumata Siré Diakité (Ambassador agrée); Yassoungo Kone (Chargé d'Affaires a.i.)
Malta	03.09.2008	Valletta, Malta	Laurence Grech
Mauritania	15.12.2010	Moscow, Russia	Sidi Mohamed Ould Taleb Amar
Mexico	2017	Helsinki, Finland	Ernesto Céspedes Oropeza
Moldova	18.11.2010	Tallinn, Estonia	Victor Guzun
Mongolia		Warsaw, Poland	Tumen Tegshjargal (Chargé d'Affaires a.i.)
Montenegro		Warsaw, Poland	Ivan Leković (Ambassador agrée)
Morocco		Helsinki, Finland	Mohammed Ariad (Ambassador agrée); Mohamed el GhroussiI (Chargé d'Affaires a.i.)
Namibia	22.05.2012	Stockholm, Sweden	Daniel Rudolph Smith
Nepal		Moscow, Russia	vacant
Netherlands	15.02.2013	Tallinn, Estonia	Jos Schellaars
New Zealand	29.06.2011	Berlin, Germany	Peter Howard Rider
Nicaragua	21.06.2005	Helsinki, Finland	Ricardo José Alvarado Noguera
Nigeria	30.08.2012	Kyiv, Ukraine	Frank Ngozi Isoh
North Macedonia	15.02.2013	Tallinn, Estonia	Sasho Veljanovski
Norway	29.09.2009	Tallinn, Estonia	Lise Nicoline Kleven Grevstad
Oman	30.08.2012	London, UK	Abdulaziz bin Andullah bin Zahir Al Hinai
Pakistan		Stockholm, Sweden	Najeeb Durrani (Chargé d'Affaires a.i.)
Palestine		Helsinki, Finland	Nabil D.M. Alwazir
Panama		Warsaw, Poland	Yessenia Chalá (Chargé d'Affaires a.i.)
Paraguay	23.11.2012	Berlin, Germany	Raúl Alberto Florentín Antola
Peru	15.12.2010	Helsinki, Finland	Pablo Hugo Portugal Rodriguez
Philippines		Stockholm, Sweden	Cecille Joyce Lao (Chargé d'Affaires a.i.)
Poland	28.10.2010	Tallinn, Estonia	Grzegorz Marek Poznański
Portugal	10.12.2009	Tallinn, Estonia	Maria de Fátima Pina Perestrello
Qatar	26.04.2011	Warsaw, Poland	Hadi Nasser Mansour Khalil Al-Hajri
Romania	28.09.2011	Helsinki, Finland	Marian Cătălin Avramescu
Russia	28.10.2010	Tallinn, Estonia	Yury Merzlyakov
Rwanda	16.02.2011	The Hague, Netherlands	Immaculée Uwanyiligira
San Marino	20.03.2008	City of San Marino, San Marino	Silvia Berti
Serbia	30.01.2013	Helsinki, Finland	Slavko Kruljević
Slovakia	18.06.2009	Riga, Latvia	Dušan Krištofík
Slovenia	15.02.2013	Helsinki, Finland	Bogdan Benko
South Africa	28.06.2012	Helsinki, Finland	Cloepus Phaswana Moloto
South Korea	18.10.2010	Helsinki, Finland	Dongsun Park
Spain	29.06.2011	Tallinn, Estonia	Álvaro de la Riva Guzmán de Frutos
Sri Lanka	23.11.2011	Stockholm, Sweden	Oshadhi Alahapperuma
Sweden		Tallinn, Estonia	Ingrid Tersman
Switzerland		Tallinn, Estonia	Beat Bürgi (Chargé d'Affaires a. i.)
Syria		Minsk, Belarus	Wajih Ibrahim (Chargé d'Affaires a. i.)
Tajikistan	11.10.2012	Minsk, Belarus	Kozidavlat Koimdodov
Tanzania	31.03.2011	Täby, Sweden	Muhammed Mwinyi Haji Mzale
Thailand		Helsinki, Finland	n/a (Ambassador agrée) n/a (Chargé d'Affaires a. i.)
Tunisia		Warsaw, Poland	Nadra Rais Drije (Ambassador agrée); Nabih Abed (Chargé d'Affaires a. i.)
Turkey	29.10.2009	Tallinn, Estonia	Ayşenur Alpaslan
Ukraine	27.01.2011	Tallinn, Estonia	Viktor Kryzhanivsky
United Arab Emirates		Berlin, Germany	Ibrahim Mohd J. al Mansouri (Chargé d'Affaires a. i.)
United Kingdom	06.07.2021	Tallinn, Estonia	Ross Allen
United States	17.09.2012	Tallinn, Estonia	Jeffrey Levine
Uruguay		Stockholm, Sweden	Alejandro Garófali (Chargé d'Affaires a. i.)
Venezuela		Helsinki, Finland	Ernesto Navazio Mossucca (Chargé d'Affaires a. i.)
Vietnam	22.09.2020	Helsinki, Finland	Dang Thi Hai Tam
Zambia		Stockholm, Sweden	Maynard Misapa (Chargé d'Affaires a. i.)

== See also ==
- Foreign relations of Estonia
- List of diplomatic missions of Estonia
- List of diplomatic missions in Estonia
