= Alper =

- Gender: First Name: Male

Origin
- Languages: First name: Turkish / Last name: Turkish and Yiddish
- Meaning: First name: Stouthearted, Brave / Last name: Heilbronn

Other names
- Related names: First name: Alparslan, Alpay / Last name: Halperin, Alperovitz

Alper is a male Turkish given name. It is composed of the two words alp and er. In Turkish, "Alp" means "stouthearted", "brave", "chivalrous", "warrior". The second, er means "soldier, male". Additionally Alper is used as an adjective for an ancient legendary Turkish commander; Alp Er Tunga who lived around 300 B.C. From the same Asian cultural roots, Alper is closely related to the name 勇士 (Japanese yuushi, Chinese yǒngshì) derived 勇 =Alp and 士 =Er words.

"Alper" is also a variant of "Halpern/Alperin" (Halperin, Heilperin, in another Eastern European pronunciation also Galperin, Alper, Alperovich, Alpert). In this use, it is a Jewish (Ashkenazic) surname based on the name of the city of Heilbronn (see Heilprin) that was created no later than the end of the 16th century. The surname belonged to four Jewish rabbinic families from the Russian Empire, Poland, and German principalities between the 16th and 18th centuries. It is one of many variant names all derived from the city.

== Given name ==
- Alper Akçam (born 1987), Turkish-German footballer
- Alper Bagceci (born 1984), Turkish-German footballer
- Alper Balaban (born 1987), Turkish-German footballer
- Alper Gezeravcı (born 1979), Turkish pilot and astronaut
- Alper Görmüş (born 1952), Turkish journalist and writer
- Alper Kalemci (born 1991), Turkish footballer
- Alper Potuk (born 1991), Turkish footballer
- Alper Saruhan (born 1982), Turkish basketball players
- Alper Sendilmen (born 1980), Turkish-German rapper
- Alper Sezener (born 1977), Turkish author
- Alper Tuzcu (born 1990), Turkish musician
- Alper Uçar (born 1985), Turkish figure skater
- Alper Uludağ (born 1990), Turkish footballer
- Alper Yılmaz (born 1975), Turkish basketball player
- Alper Doğruöz (born 1995), Turkish colleague

== Surname ==
- Andrew Alper, former President of the New York City Economic Development Corporation (NYCEDC)
- Arthur Alper (born 1928), American volleyball player
- Bob Alper, American author, stand-up comedian, and practicing clergy member
- Bud Alper (1930–2012), American sound engineer
- Chloe Alper (born 1981), British singer-songwriter
- Howard Alper (born 1941), Canadian chemist
- Jonathan Alper (1950–1990), American actor and theatre director
- Joseph Alper (born 1946), American chemist
- Murray Alper (1904–1984), American actor
- Martin Alper (1942–2015), British video game designer
- Özcan Alper (born 1975), Turkish film director and screenwriter
- Sam Alper (1924–2002), English caravan designer and manufacturer
- Steven M. Alper (born 1958), music composer
- Tikvah Alper (1909–1995), South-African radiobiologist
