= Altai Kölgınov =

Kazakh politician (born 1978)

Altai Kölginov
- Алтай Көлгінов
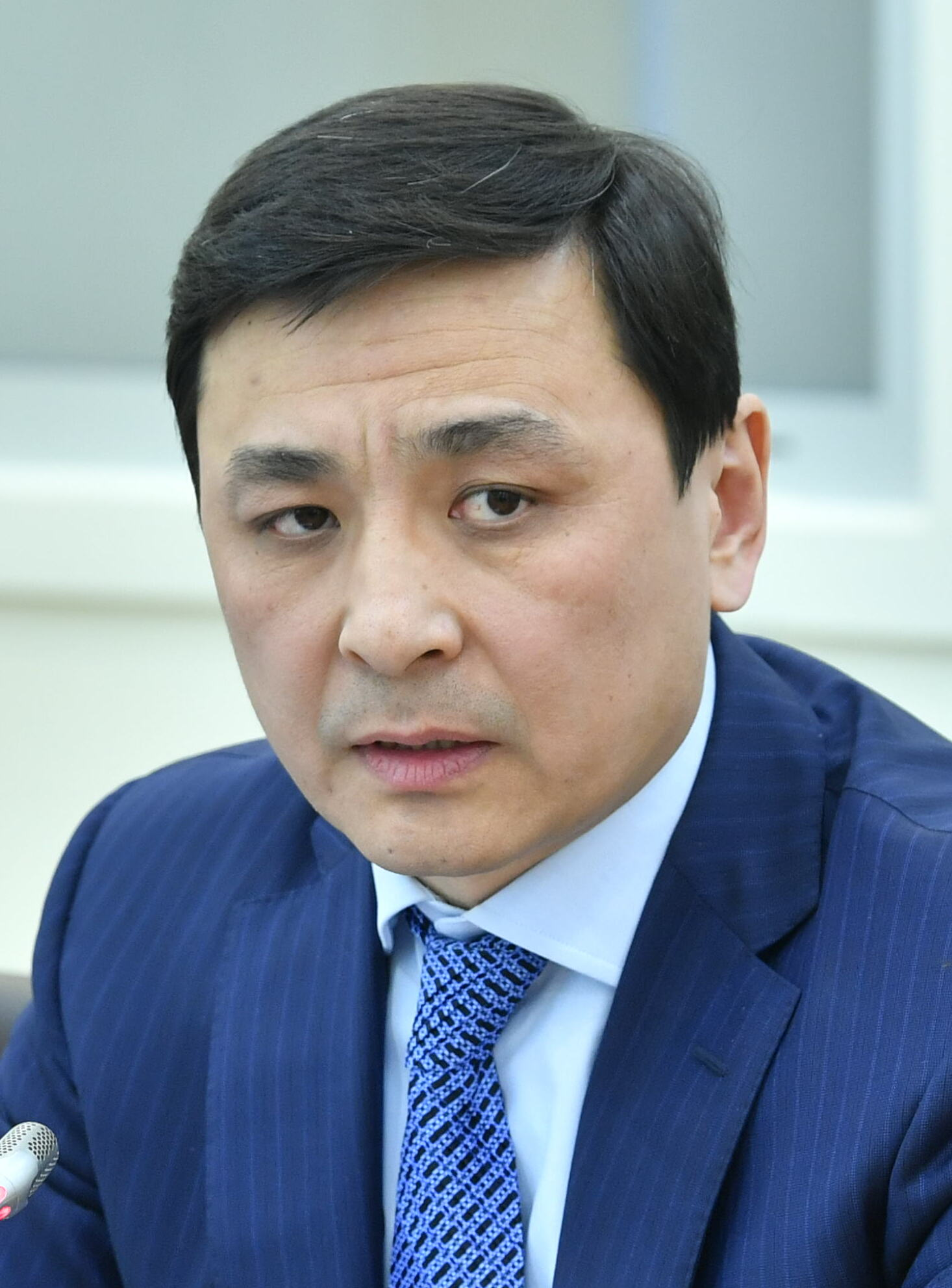
- Kölginov in 2023

Ambassador of Kazakhstan to Estonia
- Incumbent
- Assumed office 27 March 2024
- Preceded by: Nurlan Seitimov

Deputy Prime Minister of Kazakhstan
- In office 9 December 2022 – 8 June 2023

10th Äkim of Astana
- In office 13 June 2019 – 8 December 2022
- Preceded by: Bakhyt Sultanov
- Succeeded by: Zhenis Kassymbek

Äkim of West Kazakhstan Region
- In office 26 March 2016 – 13 June 2019
- Preceded by: Nurlan Nogaev
- Succeeded by: Ğaliy Esqaliyev

Äkim of Oral
- In office 4 April 2013 – 26 March 2016
- Preceded by: Bolat Şäkimov
- Succeeded by: Nariyman Töreğaliyev

Personal details
- Born: 15 January 1978 (age 48) Abai, Chimkent Region, Kazakh SSR, Soviet Union

Altai Seidırūly Kölgınov (Kazakh: Алтай Сейдірұлы Көлгінов [ɑɫtɑj sʲejdɘɾo̙ɫɯ kɵlgɘnəf]; born 15 January 1978) is a Kazakh politician, who's currently serving as the Ambassador of Kazakhstan to Estonia since March 2024. He's best known for his prior tenure as the Äkim of Astana from 2019 to 2022 and as the Deputy Prime Minister of Kazakhstan from 2022 to 2023.

== Early life and career ==
Kölginov was born in 1978, in the village of Abai in the Chimkent Oblast into a large Muslim family. He is the son of Seid Kölginov. In 2000, he served in the army.

In 2001, he worked as the chief specialist, acting in the personnel department of the Central Office of the Public Prosecutor. From 2002 to 2003, he was the prosecutor of the department for the Formation of Legal Statistics of the Committee on Legal Statistics and Special Records of the Prosecutor General's Office. In 2003, Kölginov became the Deputy Head of the Agency for Civil Service Affairs in Astana. From 2007, he was the head of the Department for Analysis and Development of By-Laws of the Ministry of Justice until 2008, when Kölginov became the deputy general director of Alash Media Group LLP. From 2010 to 2012, he worked as a state inspector of the department of state control and organizational and territorial work of the Presidential Administration.

== Political career ==
From 8 February 2012 to 4 April 2013, Kölginov was the deputy äkim of the West Kazakhstan Region until he was appointed as an äkim of Oral in which he served that position until 26 March 2016, when he became the West Kazakhstan Regional äkim.

On 13 June 2019, Kölginov was appointed as Äkim of Astana (then Nur-Sultan) by Kassym-Jomart Tokayev. Just days after assuming the role, Kölginov met with interest holders and promised to monitor the construction of their houses, by meeting with equity holders of one or two problematic LCDs every week. In response to the issues with the storm sewers rising sharply during the period of autumn rains and spring floods. Kölginov promised to solve this problem within two years. He stated that specialists will reconstruct drainage systems and build new collectors.

On 28 July 2019, Kölginov instructed to clear the mud-filled Sarybulaq River to which he called it an “environmental disaster” from the silt and bring it back to normal.

On 28 August 2019, he addressed the problems of the outskirts of the city, stating that around 280,000 people living do no have adequate access to running water. The cost for improving the area was amount to 275 billion tenge, to which Kölginov admitted that the spending cost for the improvements in the outskirts is not feasible in one year.

On 20 September 2019, at the Äkimat briefing, facing the demands by picketing mothers of many children for apartments by the state, including for those who are not standing in line, Kölginov offered the mothers jobs and housing in the North Kazakhstan Region and Ekibastuz; however, many refused and asked for apartments in Nur-Sultan. Kölginov, in response to the demands, stated that this “was wrong and not according to the law”.

On December 8, 2022, he left the post of Akim of Astana.

On December 9, 2022, he was appointed Deputy Prime Minister of Kazakhstan and on June 8, 2023, he was dismissed from the position.

On March 27, 2024, he returned to the political scene as the new Ambassador of Kazakhstan to Estonia, replacing Nurlan Seitimov.

== Criticism ==
In 2020, he was criticized for planning to spend 125 million tenge on comments in social networks positively assessing his work.

During his tenure as Äkim, Kulginov was accused of infill development in Astana. Also, Lake Taldyköl was destroyed by filling during his mayorship.

== In popular culture ==
During his tenure as the Äkim of Astana, Kölgınov was nicknamed "Kölgınov – 20%". The figure apparently spoke of the alleged kickbacks that the Äkim received from government procurement transactions, ultimately poking fun at his allegedly corrupt mayorship. When asked about his opinion on the name on June 6th, 2024, then-Deputy Prime Minister Kölgınov would criticise the nickname, calling it an "accusation", replying to the journalist not to ask such things, saying that they would "be the ones responsible" and claiming that "such attacks against civil servants do happen; they are ordered [by someone]", also adding "Please don't do this. As akim, I worked conscientiously with my colleagues for the interests of our residents. And I'm not ashamed of my work". Just a few days after this incident, Kölgınov would be dismissed as Deputy Prime Minister.
