= Jon Beckwith =

American microbiologist and geneticist

Jonathan Beckwith
- Born: December 25, 1935 (age 90); Cambridge, Massachusetts
- Education: Pasteur Institute, Paris; Harvard University
- Known for: Isolating the first gene from a bacterial chromosome
- Awards: Abbott-ASM Lifetime Achievement Award from the American Society for Microbiology; Selman A. Waksman Award in Microbiology from the National Academy of Sciences
- Scientific career
- Fields: Microbiology; Genetics
- Workplaces: Harvard Medical School
- Academic advisors: Sydney Brenner, Arthur Pardee, François Jacob

Jonathan Roger Beckwith (born December 25, 1935, in Cambridge, Massachusetts) is an American microbiologist and geneticist. He is the American Cancer Society Professor in the Department of Microbiology and Immunobiology at Harvard Medical School in Boston, Massachusetts.

== Biography ==
He trained with Sydney Brenner, Arthur Pardee, and François Jacob at the Institut Pasteur in France before arriving at Harvard University.

== Research ==
Beckwith led the research group that in 1969 isolated the first gene from a bacterial chromosome. Some of the researchers worked in the Beckwith laboratory at the Harvard Medical School and consisted of several now well-known scientists and doctors including James A. Shapiro and Lawrence Eron, MD.; others (Lorne MacHattie and Garret Ihler) were located in the laboratory of Charles Thomas. The procedure used was devised by Garret Ihler and Karin Ippen. Complementary strands of the gene, carried within non-complementary strands of viral DNA, from viruses transducing the gene in reverse orientations which had been separated by a poly U,G density-gradient technique, were annealed to form double-stranded DNA. The single-stranded DNA was then removed using a single-strand specific DNase under investigation in the Thomas laboratory, leaving the double-stranded gene intact. The elegant electron micrographs of the pre- and post-digested DNA were taken by MacHattie in the Thomas laboratory. Before and following this experiment, Beckwith made important contributions to the study of bacterial genetics. His studies include the mechanisms of protein secretion, disulfide bond formation, and cell division. In addition, he is a prominent speaker on the social implications of science and has been an activist in science. He spoke out against the testing of boys for XYY chromosomes and was a member of the ELSI (Ethical, Legal, and Social Implications) committee of the Human Genome Project initiated by James D. Watson. He has worked on issues of social responsibility in science and since 1983 has taught a course on the Social Issues in Biology at Harvard University, one of the first of its kind. He was elected a Fellow of the American Academy of Arts and Sciences in 1986.

== Honors ==
In 2005 he received the Abbott-ASM Lifetime Achievement Award from the American Society for Microbiology for "sustained, remarkable contributions to the microbiological sciences". Beckwith was the 2009 recipient of the Selman A. Waksman Award in Microbiology from the National Academy of Sciences.

Beckwith is a member of the National Academy of Sciences.

== Selected publications ==
- Beckwith, Jon; Ard, Catherine; Asch, Adrienne; Alper, Joseph S., eds. (2004). The Double-Edged Helix: Social Implications of Genetics in a Diverse Society. Baltimore, Md.: Johns Hopkins University Press. ISBN 978-0-8018-7926-5.
- Beckwith, Jonathan R. (2002). Making Genes, Making Waves: A Social Activist in Science. Harvard University Press. ISBN 978-0-674-00928-8.
