= Alpay =

- Gender: Male
- Language: Turkish

Origin
- Origin: Alp
- Meaning: "warrior+moon" "moon warrior, brave offspring, moon knight”
- Region of origin: Turkey

Other names
- Related names: Alparslan, Alper

Alpay is a masculine given name and surname of Turkish origin. It is a combination of the words alp and ay. In Turkish, alp means "stouthearted, brave, hero, warrior, man" and ay means "moon". It can mean "moon warrior, brave offspring, moon knight”. Notable people with the name include:

== Given name ==
- Alpay (singer) (1935–2026), Turkish singer
- Alpay Çelebi (born 1999), Turkish footballer
- Alpay Koçaklı (born 1998), Turkish footballer
- Alpay Özalan (born 1973), Turkish footballer

== Surname ==
- David Alpay (born 1980), Canadian actor
