= Ayşenur =

Ayşenur is a Turkish feminine given name, and may refer to:

- Ayşenur Alpaslan (born 1953), Turkish diplomat and former ambassador
- Ayşenur Budak (born 2003), Turkish judoka
- Ayşenur Duman (born 1999), Turkish Olympian cross-country skier
- Ayşenur Ezgi Eygi (1998–2024), Turkish-born American human rights activist
- Ayşenur İslam (born 1958), Turkish university lecturer and politician
- Ayşenur Sormaz (born 2000), Turkish handball player
- Ayşenur Taşbakan (born 1982), Turkish taekwondo coach and former practitioner
- Ayşenur Zarakolu (1946–2002), Turkish author, publisher and human rights advocate
