= Lawrence Eron =

American physician

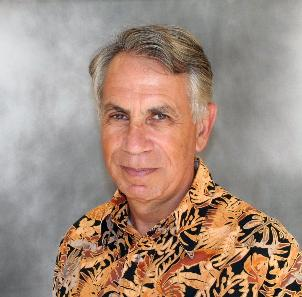
- Born: June 28, 1944 (age 81); Richmond, Virginia, United States
- Education: Harvard University (School of Medicine) and Princeton University (Biochemistry)

Lawrence Eron is an infectious diseases specialist practicing in Honolulu, Hawaii. In 2009 he received the Clinician Award from the Infectious Diseases Society of America "for outstanding achievements in the clinical practice of infectious diseases." In 2011, he was also included by Pacific Business News on the list of Best Doctors in Hawaii.

He graduated from Princeton University in 1966 with a degree in Biochemistry. He then spent a year doing post-graduate research in microbiology at the University of Cambridge in England before attending Harvard Medical School in 1967. While at Harvard Medical School, he worked on a research team with the American geneticist Jonathan Beckwith, and in 1969, the team successfully isolated a single group of genes from a bacterial chromosome. They are credited as the first researchers to accomplish isolation of a single genetic element according to an article that appeared in the New York Times on December 8, 1969. He subsequently graduated magna cum laude from Harvard Medical School in 1971 and then performed his internship, residency, and fellowship in infectious diseases at the Massachusetts General Hospital in Boston from 1971 to 1976.

From 1976 to 1978, Eron served as a senior investigator at the Bureau of Biologics of the National Institutes of Health (NIH) prior to entering private practice in Virginia. He founded an infectious diseases private practice with Donald Poretz in 1978. Together with Poretz, they were the first to recognize the potential value of outpatient intravenous antibiotic therapy (OPAT) for clinically stable patients. They also cared for an ill animal handler in Reston, Virginia, from a laboratory that experienced an outbreak of the deadly Ebola virus. This real-life event became the basis of a best-selling book, The Hot Zone and the fictional 1995 Hollywood movie Outbreak.

On October 1, 1985, the New York Times featured Eron in an article about his then novel approach to treating genital warts caused by the Human Papillomavirus (HPV). Eron and his colleagues used the anti-viral hormone interferon to clear patients of genital warts. Over a 9-month period, 85% of Eron's patients were cleared and remained free of genital warts.

Since 1998, Eron has served as an Infectious Disease Consultant at Kaiser Moanalua Medical Center in Honolulu, Hawaii. In his current post at Kaiser, Eron is recognized as one of the early pioneers of telemedicine, which has been particularly useful in treating patients who live in geographically remote regions in the Pacific, without immediate access to hospitals and other healthcare facilities. He is also an Associate Professor of Medicine at the University of Hawaii.
