= Alpaslan =

Alpaslan is a given name. Notable people with the name include:

- Alpaslan Eratlı (born 1948), Turkish footballer
- Alpaslan Öztürk (born 1993), Turkish-Belgian footballer

== See also ==
- Alparslan (disambiguation)
- Alpaslan, Taşova, a town in the district of Taşova, Amasya Province, Turkey
