= Tim Kleindienst =

German footballer

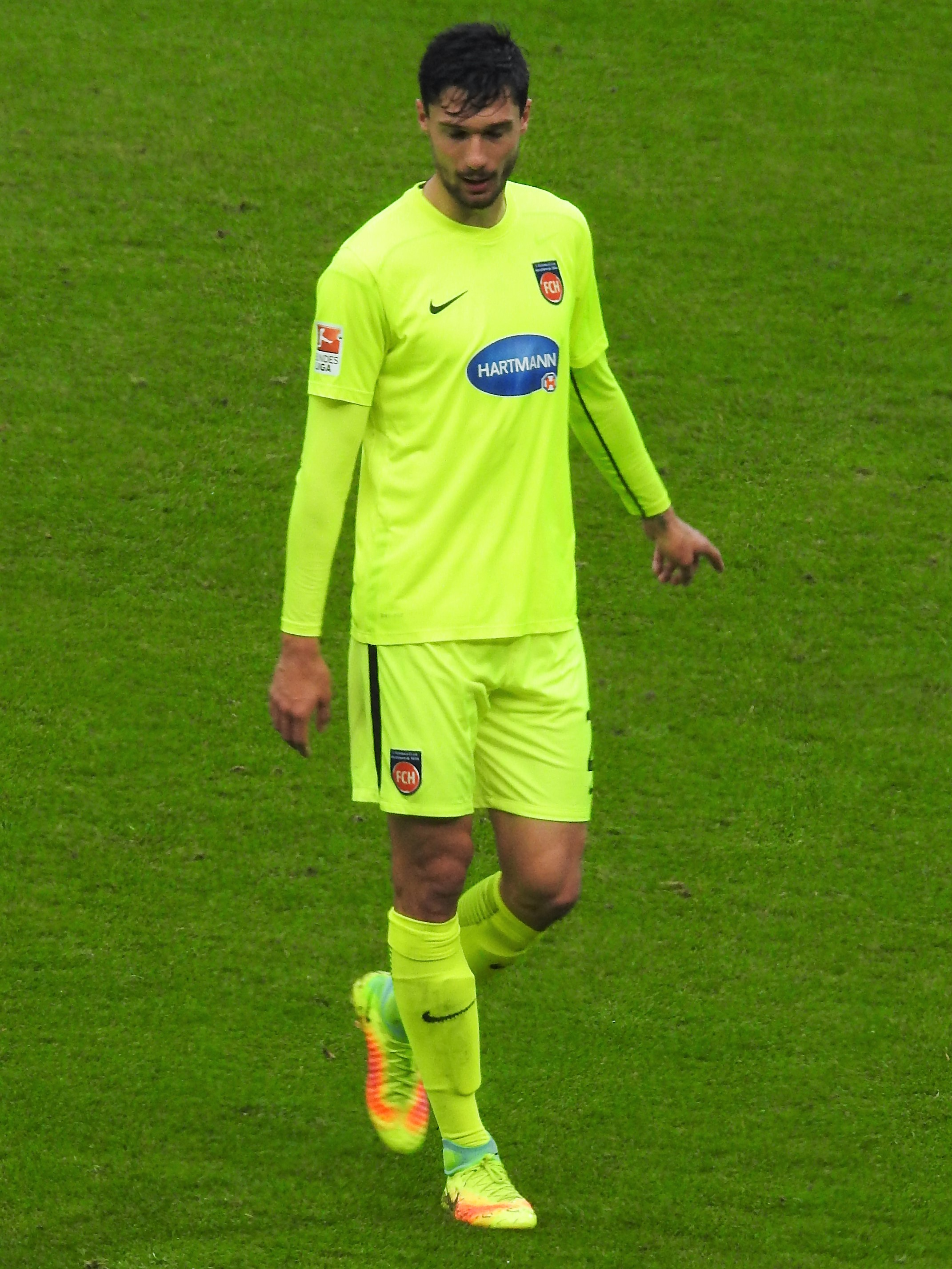
- Kleindienst with 1. FC Heidenheim in 2017

Personal information
- Date of birth: 31 August 1995 (age 31)
- Place of birth: Jüterbog, Germany
- Height: 1.94 m (6 ft 4 in)
- Position: Striker

Team information
- Current team: Borussia Mönchengladbach
- Number: 11

Youth career
- –2008: FC Viktoria Jüterbog
- 2008–2013: Energie Cottbus

Senior career*
Years	Team	Apps	(Gls)
2013	Energie Cottbus II	4	(0)
2013–2015	Energie Cottbus	37	(13)
2015–2019	SC Freiburg	33	(2)
2016–2019	→ SC Freiburg II	11	(3)
2016–2017	→ 1. FC Heidenheim (loan)	27	(7)
2019–2020	1. FC Heidenheim	27	(14)
2020–2021	Gent	15	(1)
2021	→ 1. FC Heidenheim (loan)	15	(11)
2021–2024	1. FC Heidenheim	95	(47)
2024–	Borussia Mönchengladbach	37	(16)

International career^{‡}
2014–2016	Germany U20	10	(0)
2024–	Germany	6	(4)
- * Club domestic league appearances and goals as of 12 September 2026 (UTC) ‡ National team caps and goals as of 13:44, 24 March 2025 (UTC)

Tim Kleindienst (born 31 August 1995) is a German professional footballer who plays as a striker for Bundesliga club Borussia Mönchengladbach, which he captains, and the Germany national team.

== Club career ==
=== Energie Cottbus ===
Kleindienst joined Energie Cottbus in 2008 from FC Viktoria Jüterbog. He made his 2. Bundesliga debut at 14 December 2013 against Fortuna Düsseldorf replacing Amin Affane after 78 minutes in a 3–1 home defeat.

=== SC Freiburg ===
On 20 May 2015, it was announced that Kleindienst would join SC Freiburg for the 2015–16 season.

=== 1. FC Heidenheim ===
On 2 September 2019, Kleindienst re-joined 1. FC Heidenheim having spent the 2016–17 season on loan at the club.

=== Gent ===
On 30 July 2020, Kleindienst signed for Belgian First Division A side Gent. The transfer fee was undisclosed.

=== Return to 1. FC Heidenheim ===
In June 2021, Kleindienst returned to 1. FC Heidenheim by signing a contract until 2025. On the final matchday of the 2022–23 season, Kleindienst scored in the 99th minute in the stoppage time to secure a 3–2 away win against Jahn Regensburg, in which his club finished top of the table and promoted to the Bundesliga for the first time in their history. In that season, he also managed to achieve the top scorer of the division with 25 goals.

On 6 April 2024, he scored a brace in a 3–2 victory over defending champion Bayern Munich, to be the latter's first defeat against a newly promoted side since 2000. He finished the 2023–24 season with the most aerial duels won in Bundesliga in 187 occasions, and also recorded the highest number of sprints, totaling 1,056.

=== Borussia Mönchengladbach ===
On 21 June 2024, Kleindienst joined Borussia Mönchengladbach by signing a contract until 2028. In his debut season, he scored 16 goals, his personal best in Bundesliga, and was also voted the club's Player of the Season. Ahead of the 2025–26 season, he was named the club's captain.

== International career ==
In May 2015, Kleindienst was named in the Germany U20 which participated in the 2015 World Cup in New Zealand.

On 3 October 2024, he was called up to the senior national team for the first time. Eight days later, he made his senior debut by starting in a 2–1 away victory against Bosnia and Herzegovina in the UEFA Nations League. A month later, on 16 November, he scored his first international goals by netting a brace in a 7–0 victory over Bosnia and Herzegovina in the same competition. In March 2025, Kleindienst scored two headers in total in both quarter-final legs against Italy, helping Germany advancing to the final four for the first time.

== Career statistics ==
=== Club ===
As of match played 12 September 2026

Appearances and goals by club, season and competition
Club	Season	League			DFB-Pokal		Europe		Other		Total	
Club	Season	Division	Apps	Goals	Apps	Goals	Apps	Goals	Apps	Goals	Apps	Goals
Energie Cottbus II	2012–13	Regionalliga Nordost	4	0	—		—		—		4	0
Energie Cottbus	2012–13	2. Bundesliga	0	0	0	0	—		—		0	0
Energie Cottbus	2013–14	2. Bundesliga	2	0	0	0	—		—		2	0
Energie Cottbus	2014–15	3. Liga	35	13	1	0	—		—		36	13
Energie Cottbus	Total		37	13	1	0	0	0	0	0	38	13
SC Freiburg	2015–16	2. Bundesliga	7	0	1	0	—		—		8	0
SC Freiburg	2017–18	Bundesliga	22	2	1	0	2 (Note: Appearances in UEFA Europa League)	0	—		25	2
SC Freiburg	2018–19	Bundesliga	4	0	2	0	—		—		6	0
SC Freiburg	2019–20	Bundesliga	0	0	0	0	—		—		0	0
SC Freiburg	Total		33	2	4	0	2	0	0	0	39	2
SC Freiburg II	2015–16	Regionalliga Südwest	8	2	—		—		—		8	2
SC Freiburg II	2018–19	Regionalliga Südwest	2	1	—		—		—		2	1
SC Freiburg II	2019–20	Regionalliga Südwest	1	0	—		—		—		1	0
SC Freiburg II	Total		11	3	0	0	0	0	0	0	11	3
1. FC Heidenheim (loan)	2016–17	2. Bundesliga	27	7	1	0	—		—		28	7
1. FC Heidenheim	2019–20	2. Bundesliga	27	14	0	0	—		2 (Note: Appearances in Bundesliga promotion play-offs)	2	29	16
Gent	2020–21	Belgian Pro League	15	1	—		8 (Note: Three appearances and one goal in UEFA Champions League, five appearances and one goal in UEFA Europa League)	2	—		23	3
1. FC Heidenheim (loan)	2020–21	2. Bundesliga	15	11	—		—		—		15	11
1. FC Heidenheim	2021–22	2. Bundesliga	30	10	1	0	—		—		30	10
1. FC Heidenheim	2022–23	2. Bundesliga	32	25	2	0	—		—		34	25
1. FC Heidenheim	2023–24	Bundesliga	33	12	2	2	—		—		35	14
1. FC Heidenheim	Total		88	42	5	2	—		—		92	44
Borussia Mönchengladbach	2024–25	Bundesliga	30	16	2	0	—		—		32	16
Borussia Mönchengladbach	2025–26	Bundesliga	3	0	0	0	—		—		3	0
Borussia Mönchengladbach	2026–27	Bundesliga	3	0	0	0	—		—		3	0
Borussia Mönchengladbach	Total		36	16	2	0	—		—		38	16
Career total			293	109	13	2	10	2	2	2	318	117

=== International ===
As of match played 23 March 2025

Appearances and goals by national team and year
National team	Year	Apps	Goals
Germany	2024	4	2
Germany	2025	2	2
Total		6	4

Scores and results list Germany's goal tally first, score column indicates score after each Kleindienst goal.

List of international goals scored by Tim Kleindienst
No.	Date	Venue	Opponent	Score	Result	Competition
1	16 November 2024	Europa-Park Stadion, Freiburg, Germany	Bosnia and Herzegovina	2–0	7–0	2024–25 UEFA Nations League A
2	16 November 2024	Europa-Park Stadion, Freiburg, Germany	Bosnia and Herzegovina	7–0	7–0	2024–25 UEFA Nations League A
3	20 March 2025	San Siro, Milan, Italy	Italy	1–1	2–1	2024–25 UEFA Nations League A
4	23 March 2025	Westfalenstadion, Dortmund, Germany	Italy	3–0	3–3	2024–25 UEFA Nations League A

== Honours ==
SC Freiburg

- 2. Bundesliga: 2015–16

1. FC Heidenheim

- 2. Bundesliga: 2022–23

Individual

- 2. Bundesliga top goalscorer: 2022–23
