= Gökalp =

Gökalp or Gokalp is a Turkish male given name and surname formed by the two Turkish words gök ("sky; blue") and alp ("brave, hero") – therefore literally be translated as "sky hero", but considering the second meaning of gök also as "blue eyed hero" – and may refer to:

== Given name ==
- Gökalp Ergen (born 1977), Turkish musician
- Gökalp Kılıç (born 2000), German footballer
- Göktürk Gökalp Ural (born 1995), Turkish basketball player

== Surname ==
- Bahanur Şahin Gökalp (born 1991), Turkish volleyball player
- Mertim Gokalp (born 1981), Australian portrait and figure painter
- Ziya Gökalp (1876–1924), Turkish sociologist, writer, poet, and political activist
- Hüseyin Gökalp (born 1981), Turkish theologist, writer and academician
