= Emil Druc =

Moldovan diplomat (born 1956)

Moldovan Ambassador to Lithuania
- In office 15 August 2022 – 16 October 2026
- President: Maia Sandu
- Prime Minister: Natalia Gavrilița; Dorin Recean; Alexandru Munteanu; Eugen Osmochescu (acting); Vasile Tofan
- Preceded by: Sergiu Mihov

Moldovan Ambassador to Canada
- In office 21 December 2020 – 19 August 2022
- President: Igor Dodon; Maia Sandu
- Prime Minister: Ion Chicu; Aureliu Ciocoi (acting); Natalia Gavrilița
- Preceded by: Ala Beleavschi
- Succeeded by: Sergiu Odainic

Moldovan Ambassador to France and Monaco
- In office 10 July 2017 – 12 March 2019
- President: Igor Dodon
- Prime Minister: Pavel Filip
- Preceded by: Eugeniu Revenco
- Succeeded by: Corina Călugăru

Moldovan Ambassador to Sweden, Finland and Norway
- In office 21 June 2010 – 4 June 2015
- President: Mihai Ghimpu (acting); Vlad Filat (acting); Marian Lupu (acting); Nicolae Timofti
- Prime Minister: Vlad Filat; Iurie Leancă; Chiril Gaburici
- Preceded by: Natalia Gherman
- Succeeded by: Veaceslav Dobîndă

Personal details
- Born: 17 May 1956 (age 70) Pociumbăuţi, Moldavian SSR, Soviet Union
- Education: Leningrad State Institute of Theatre, Music, and Cinema; National University of Political Studies and Public Administration
- Profession: Diplomat

Emil Druc (born 17 May 1956) is a Moldovan diplomat.
