= Veaceslav Dobîndă =

Moldovan diplomat

Moldovan Ambassador to Netherlands and Denmark
- Incumbent
- Assumed office 13 October 2022
- President: Maia Sandu
- Prime Minister: Natalia Gavrilița; Dorin Recean; Alexandru Munteanu; Eugen Osmochescu (acting); Vasile Tofan
- Preceded by: Tatiana Pîrvu

Secretary of State of the Ministry of Foreign Affairs and European Integration
- In office 9 August 2021 – 13 October 2022
- President: Maia Sandu
- Prime Minister: Natalia Gavrilița
- Minister: Nicu Popescu

Moldovan Ambassador to Sweden, Finland, Norway and Iceland
- In office 5 November 2015 – 15 June 2020
- President: Nicolae Timofti; Igor Dodon
- Prime Minister: Gheorghe Brega (acting); Pavel Filip; Maia Sandu; Ion Chicu
- Preceded by: Emil Druc
- Succeeded by: Liliana Guțan

Moldovan Ambassador to Estonia
- In office 28 August 2008 – 18 September 2010
- President: Vladimir Voronin; Mihai Ghimpu (acting)
- Prime Minister: Zinaida Greceanîi; Vitalie Pîrlog (acting); Vladimir Filat
- Preceded by: Eduard Melnic
- Succeeded by: Victor Guzun

Personal details
- Born: 18 December 1971 (age 54) Florești, Moldavian SSR, Soviet Union
- Education: Moldova State University

Veaceslav Dobîndă (born 18 December 1971) is a Moldovan diplomat who currently serves as the Moldovan Ambassador to the Netherlands.
