= Victor Guzun =

Moldovan teacher, politician, and diplomat (born 1975)

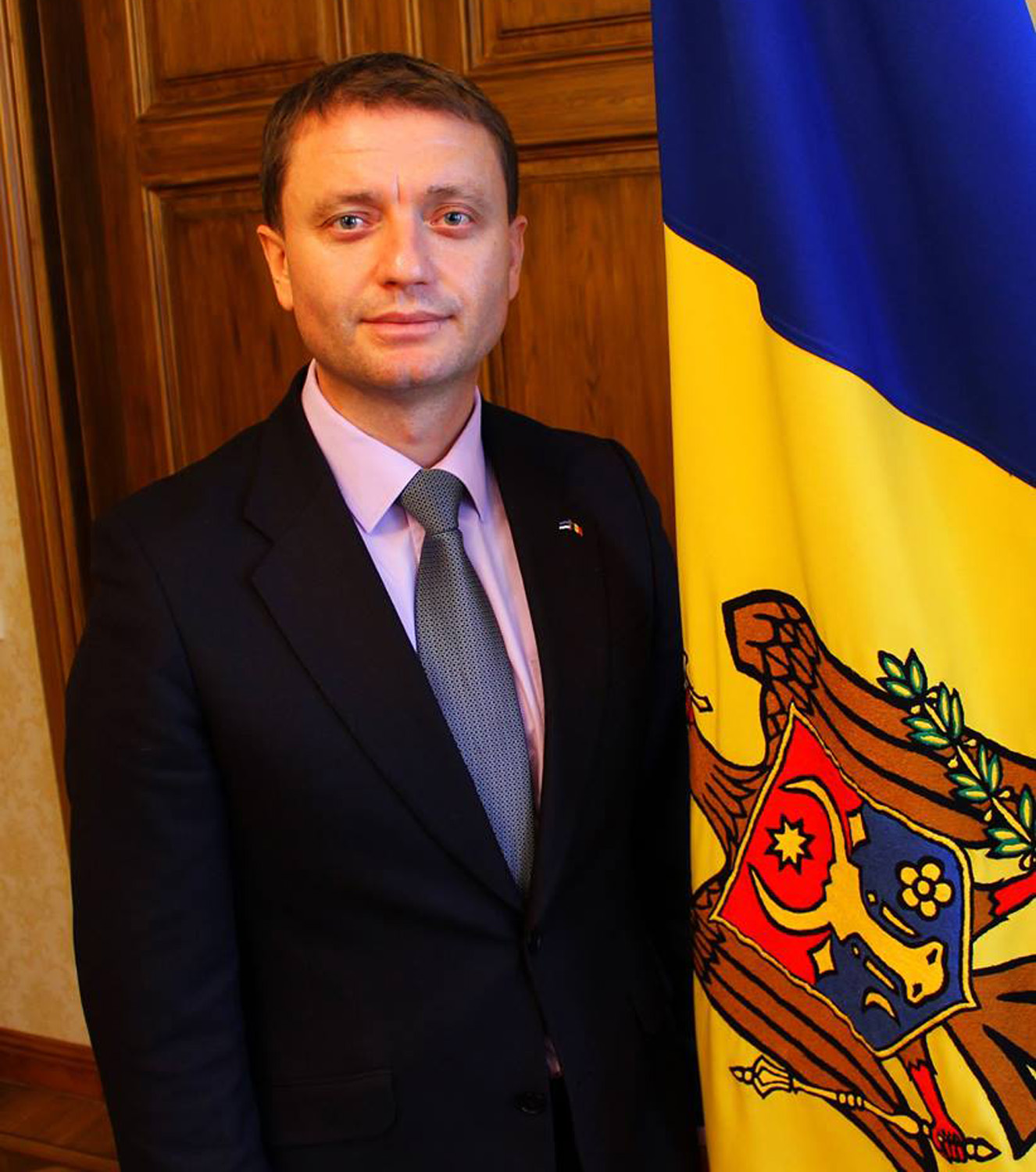
- Official portrait, 2015

Moldovan Ambassador to Estonia
- In office 18 September 2010 – 4 June 2015
- President: Mihai Ghimpu (acting); Vladimir Filat (acting); Marian Lupu (acting); Nicolae Timofti
- Prime Minister: Vladimir Filat; Iurie Leancă; Chiril Gaburici
- Preceded by: Veaceslav Dobîndă
- Succeeded by: Inga Ionesii

Personal details
- Born: 24 April 1975 (age 51) Drăsliceni, Moldavian SSR, Soviet Union
- Profession: Diplomat

Victor Guzun (born 24 April 1975) is a Moldovan teacher, politician and diplomat. He served as the Ambassador of the Republic of Moldova to Estonia.

== Early career ==
He graduated Tiraspol State University in 1996 (Geography), Free International University (Master's degree in International relations, 2002) and the Estonian School of Diplomacy (2007).

Previously, Guzun held the position of Director of Foreign Relations and European Integration Department, Ministry of Transport and Road Infrastructure, Director of Centre for European Studies, lecturer of geopolitics at International Institute of Management, deputy-director and teacher at “Gheorghe Asachi” high-school, Chisinau, Republic of Moldova.
