= Tobias Reithmeir =

German footballer

Personal information
- Date of birth: 13 August 1999 (age 27)
- Place of birth: Germany
- Height: 1.90 m (6 ft 3 in)
- Position: Centre-back

Team information
- Current team: FC Pipinsried
- Number: 4

Youth career
- VfL Westendorf
- TSV Meitingen
- JFG Donauwörth
- –2016: FC Ingolstadt
- 2016–2018: 1. FC Heidenheim

Senior career*
Years	Team	Apps	(Gls)
2018–2019	1. FC Heidenheim	3	(0)
2019–2020	Austria Lustenau	2	(0)
2020	FC Bayern Alzenau	3	(0)
2020–2021	SV Rödinghausen	22	(2)
2021–2022	FC Gießen	31	(0)
2022–2024	Rot Weiss Ahlen	52	(3)
2024–2025	Chemie Leipzig	17	(1)
2026–	FC Pipinsried	18	(2)
- * Club domestic league appearances and goals as of 27 September 2026

Tobias Reithmeir (born 13 August 1999) is a German professional footballer who plays as a centre-back for FC Pipinsried.

== Career ==
In May 2018, Reithmeir signed his first professional contract with 1. FC Heidenheim, lasting one-year until 30 June 2019. He made his professional debut for Heidenheim in the 2. Bundesliga on 10 February 2019, starting in the away match against Darmstadt 98, which finished as a 2–1 win. He left Heidenheim in September 2019 by mutual consent, and joined Austrian 2. Liga side SC Austria Lustenau in late October on a contract until the end of the season. He returned to Germany on 31 January 2020, joining Regionalliga Südwest side FC Bayern Alzenau, before leaving the club in the summer of 2020.

On 16 May 2020, he signed with another fourth-tier club SV Rödinghausen.
