= Arthur Alper =

American volleyball player (1928–2025)

Personal information
- Born: June 4, 1928; Los Angeles, California, U.S.
- Died: April 24, 2025 (aged 96); Santa Monica, California, U.S.
- Height: 6 ft 5 in (1.95 m)
Medal record
Men's volleyball
Representing the United States
Pan American Games
Gold medal – first place	1959 Chicago	Team

Arthur Joseph Alper (June 4, 1928 – April 24, 2025) is an American former volleyball player. He won a gold medal at the 1959 Pan American Games as a member of the United States men's volleyball team.
