= Robert Strauß =

German footballer

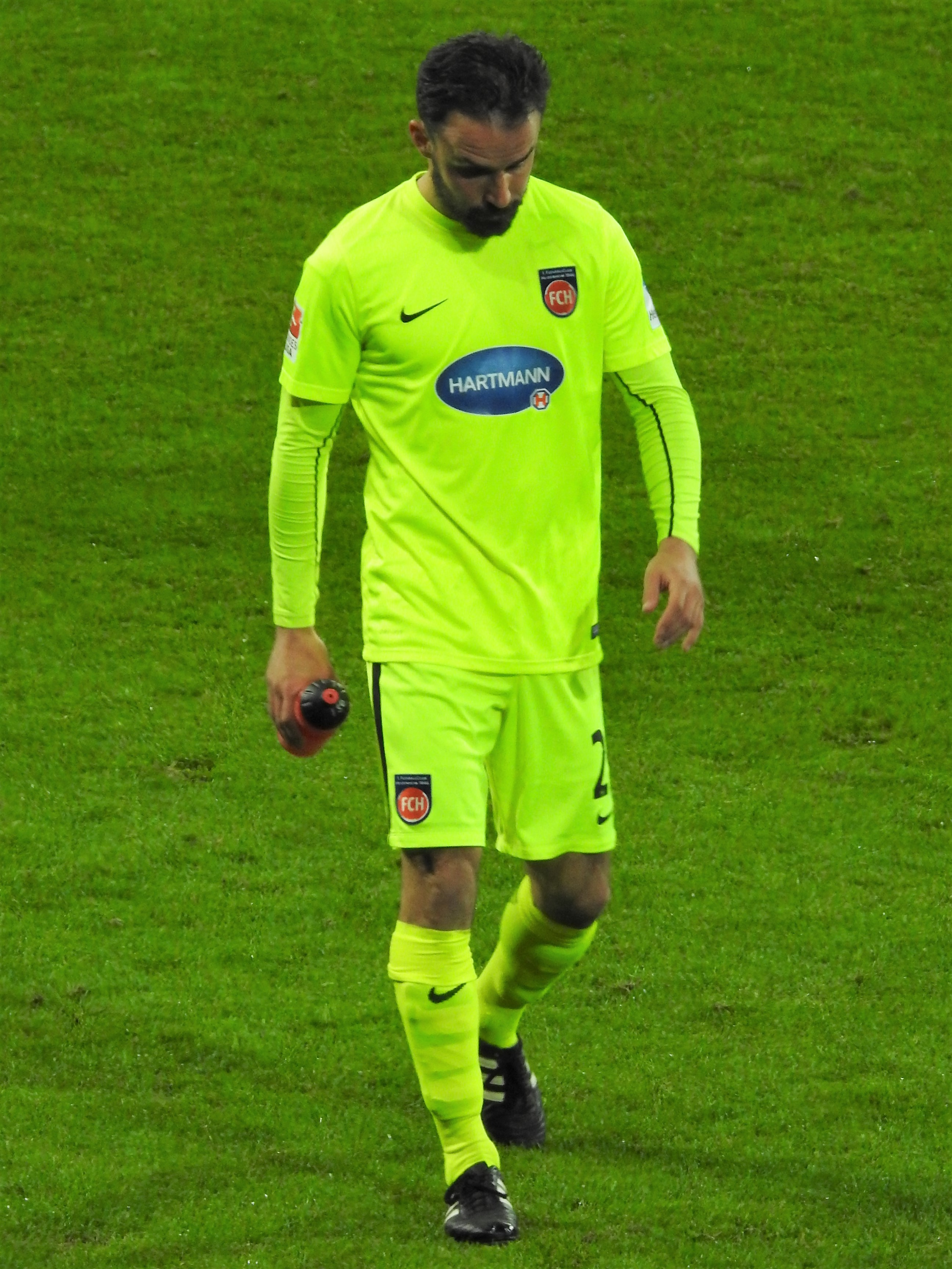
- Strauß with 1. FC Heidenheim in 2017

Personal information
- Date of birth: 7 October 1986 (age 40)
- Place of birth: Oettingen, West Germany
- Height: 1.75 m (5 ft 9 in)
- Position: Midfielder

Youth career
- 1994–1997: TSV Großorheim
- 1997–2000: Hoppinger SV
- 2000–2001: TSV Nördlingen
- 2001–2004: FC Augsburg

Senior career*
Years	Team	Apps	(Gls)
2004–2010	FC Augsburg	91	(0)
2010–2012	FC Erzgebirge Aue	12	(0)
2012–2020	1. FC Heidenheim	192	(3)
Total		295	(3)
- * Club domestic league appearances and goals as of 22:33, 29 August 2020 (UTC)

Robert Strauß (born 7 October 1986) is a German former professional footballer who played as a midfielder. He played for FC Augsburg, FC Erzgebirge Aue and 1. FC Heidenheim before retiring in 2020. He now works with the board of directors at 1. FC Heidenheim.
