= Jonathan Alper =

American actor and theatre director (1950–1990)

Jonathan L. Alper (September 14, 1950 – December 3, 1990) was an American actor and theatre director. He graduated from Amherst College in 1971. He made his acting debut in The Madness of God in 1974. Alper served as literary manager for the Folger Theatre from 1975 through 1978. In 1979, Alper directed and acted in a tour of The Romance of Shakespeare. Jonathan Alper died in 1990 of AIDS-related causes.

== Biography ==
Jonathan Alper was born in Washington, D.C. on September 14, 1950. He was the son of Jerome M. Alper and Janet Alper (nee Levy). He received his Bachelor of Arts degree from Amherst College in 1971 and trained for the stage at the Webber-Douglas Academy in London. On December 3, 1990, Jonathan Alper died of AIDS-related causes at the age of 40 at the Lenox Hill Hospital.

== Theatrical career ==
Jonathan Alper made his professional acting debut in June 1974 in The Madness of God at the Arena Stage in his hometown of Washington, D.C.. He served as director and literary manager at the Folger Theatre from 1975 through 1978. While working with the Folger Theatre Group, Alper directed The Comedy of Errors, All's Well That Ends Well, Black Elk Speaks, Much Ado About Nothing, Teeth 'n' Smiles, and Hamlet. In 1978, Alper directed Safe House at the Manhattan Theatre Club, a production which won an Obie Award. In 1979, Alper directed and appeared in a U.S. tour of The Romance of Shakespeare. That year he also directed Fishing at the Actors' Collective in New York and The Eccentricities of a Nightingale at the Bergen Stage in New Jersey. Alper became literary manager at the Manhattan Theatre Club in 1980. He then became an artistic associate there in 1984. Throughout the 1980s, Alper developed and presented new plays by British and American playwrights, including the New York premieres of works by Brian Friel, Terrence McNally and Beth Henley.
