= Alperen =

Alperen (pronounced [ˈaɫpeɾæn]) is a Turkish given name. Traditionally, it is interpreted as “brave saint” or “heroic mystic.” In a modern reinterpretation, the name has been adapted to mean “Wise and Warrior Wolf”, symbolizing a combination of intelligence, wisdom, and a fierce, fighting spirit.

== People ==
- Alperen Acet (born 1998), Turkish high jumper
- Alperen Babacan (born 1997), Turkish footballer
- Alperen Berber (born 2005), Turkish Greco-Roman wrestler
- Alperen Duymaz (born 1992), Turkish actor and model
- Alperen Şengün (born 2002), Turkish basketball player
- Alperen Uysal (born 1994), Turkish footballer

== Other uses ==
- Alperen Hearths, a far-right youth organization in Turkey
