= Alper Kalemci =

Turkish footballer (born 1991)

Personal information
- Full name: Alper Kalemci
- Date of birth: 22 July 1991 (age 35)
- Place of birth: Muğla, Turkey
- Height: 1.75 m (5 ft 9 in)
- Position: Defensive midfielder

Team information
- Current team: Anadolu Selçukspor

Youth career
- 2002–2007: Marmaris Belediye

Senior career*
Years	Team	Apps	(Gls)
2007–2008	Marmaris Belediye	7	(0)
2008–2009	Hacettepe	0	(0)
2009–2010	Konyaspor	0	(0)
2010	Kartal Belediyespor	3	(0)
2010–2014	Elazığspor	58	(1)
2012	→ Şanlıurfaspor (loan)	0	(0)
2014	Göztepe	9	(1)
2014	Hatayspor	2	(0)
2015	Tokatspor	6	(0)
2015	Anadolu Selçukspor	4	(0)

International career
2008	Turkey U17	10	(0)
2009	Turkey U18	10	(0)
2009	Turkey U19	4	(0)
- * Club domestic league appearances and goals as of 26 August 2015

Alper Kalemci (born 22 July 1991) is a Turkish footballer who last played as a midfielder for Anadolu Selçukspor. He made his Süper Lig debut on 6 April 2013.
