= Paul King Aryene =

Ghanaian diplomat

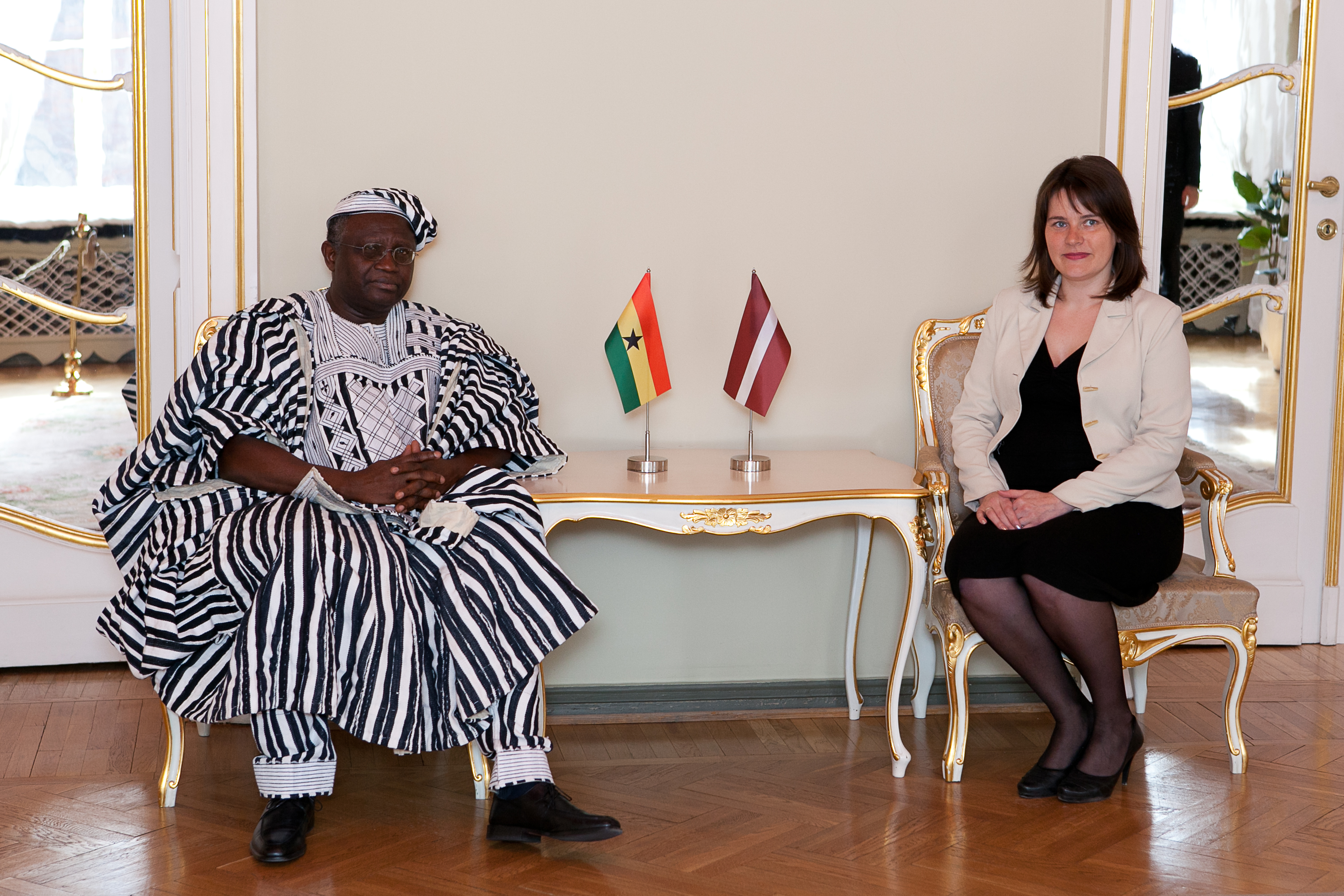
- Inga Bite meets Paul King Aryene, the Ambassador of Ghana to Germany

Ambassador of Ghana to Germany

Paul King Aryene is a retired Ghanaian diplomat and former Ambassador of Ghana to Germany.

== Career ==
In September 2009, Aryene was appointed by John Evans Atta Mills as the Ambassador of Ghana to Germany. In June 2023, he was appointed as the Acting Chairman for the board of the Republic Bank Ghana and also the chairman during the bank's 2022 annual general meeting. As at 2023, he is the director of the Republic Bank (Ghana).
