= Alp Ikizler =

Turkish nephrologist

T. Alp Ikizler is a nephrologist, currently holding the Catherine McLaughlin Hakim chair in Medicine at Vanderbilt University School of Medicine, where he does clinical work and heads a research lab. Born in Istanbul, Turkey, he received his M.D. from the Istanbul University Faculty of Medicine.

Dr. Ikizler's research focuses on the nutritional and metabolic aspects of kidney disease. Specifically, his work involves identifying reliable and practical tests for protein-caloric malnutrition, which is associated with heightened risks of mortality in kidney failure patients, and using these tests to assess different treatment strategies. One study established that dialysis changes protein metabolism in such a way as to stimulate protein degradation in muscle and other tissues. Work by Ikizler's team showed that dialysis-stimulated proteolysis is partly induced by inflammation; and that parenteral nutrition during dialysis, as well as exercise during dialysis, can mitigate the defects in protein metabolism. Later, papers assessed the effectiveness of oral nutritional supplementation, alone or with resistance exercise.

== Selected publications ==
- Caglar, K, Yilmaz, MI, Saglam, M, Cakir, E, Kilic, S, Sonmez, A, Eyileten, T, Yenicesu, M, Oguz, Y, Tasar, M, Vural, A, Ikizler, TA, Stenvinkel, P, Lindholm, B. Serum Fetuin-A Concentration and Endothelial Dysfunction in Chronic Kidney Disease. Nephron Clin Pract, 2008
- Fouque, D, Kalantar-Zadeh, K, Kopple, J, Cano, N, Chauveau, P, Cuppari, L, Franch, H, Guarnieri, G, Ikizler, TA, Kaysen, G, Lindholm, B, Massy, Z, Mitch, W, Pineda, E, Stenvinkel, P, Trevinho-Becerra, A, Wanner, C. A proposed nomenclature and diagnostic criteria for protein-energy wasting in acute and chronic kidney disease. Kidney Int, 73(4), 391-8, 2008
- Ikizler, TA. Parenteral nutrition offers no benefit over oral supplementation in malnourished hemodialysis patients. Nat Clin Pract Nephrol, 4(2), 76-7, 2008
- Ikizler, TA. Resolved: Being Fat Is Good for Dialysis Patients: The Godzilla Effect. J Am Soc Nephrol, 2008
- Ikizler, TA. Nutrition, inflammation and chronic kidney disease. Curr Opin Nephrol Hypertens, 17(2), 162-7, 2008
- Ramos, LF, Shintani, A, Ikizler, TA, Himmelfarb, J. Oxidative stress and inflammation are associated with adiposity in moderate to severe CKD. J Am Soc Nephrol, 19(3), 593-9, 2008
- Himmelfarb, J, Ikizler, TA. Acute kidney injury: changing lexicography, definitions, and epidemiology. Kidney Int, 2007
- Himmelfarb, J, Phinney, S, Ikizler, TA, Kane, J, McMonagle, E, Miller, G. Gamma-tocopherol and docosahexaenoic acid decrease inflammation in dialysis patients. J Ren Nutr, 17(5), 296-304, 2007
- Ikizler, TA. Protein and energy intake in advanced chronic kidney disease: how much is too much. Semin Dial, 20(1), 5-11, 2007
- Ikizler, TA. Effects of glucose homeostasis on protein metabolism in patients with advanced chronic kidney disease. J Ren Nutr, 17(1), 13-6, 2007
- Lacson, E, Ikizler, TA, Lazarus, JM, Teng, M, Hakim, RM. Potential impact of nutritional intervention on end-stage renal disease hospitalization, death, and treatment costs. J Ren Nutr, 17(6), 363-71, 2007
- Lacson, E, Lazarus, JM, Himmelfarb, J, Ikizler, TA, Hakim, RM. Balancing Fistula First with Catheters Last. Am J Kidney Dis, 50(3), 379-95, 2007
- Majchrzak, KM, Pupim, LB, Flakoll, PJ, Ikizler, TA. Resistance Exercise Augments the Acute Anabolic Effects of Intradialytic Oral Nutritional Supplementation. Nephrol Dial Transplant, 2007
- Majchrzak, KM, Pupim, LB, Sundell, M, Ikizler, TA. Body composition and physical activity in end-stage renal disease. J Ren Nutr, 17(3), 196-204, 2007
- Pupim, LB, Flakoll, PJ, Ikizler, TA. Exercise improves albumin fractional synthetic rate in chronic hemodialysis patients. Eur J Clin Nutr, 61(5), 686-9, 2007
- Siew, ED, Pupim, LB, Majchrzak, KM, Shintani, A, Flakoll, PJ, Ikizler, TA. Insulin resistance is associated with skeletal muscle protein breakdown in non-diabetic chronic hemodialysis patients. Kidney Int, 71(2), 146-52, 2007
- Trirogoff, ML, Shintani, A, Himmelfarb, J, Ikizler, TA. Body mass index and fat mass are the primary correlates of insulin resistance in nondiabetic stage 3-4 chronic kidney disease patients. Am J Clin Nutr, 86(6), 1642-8, 2007
- Wingard, RL, Pupim, LB, Krishnan, M, Shintani, A, Ikizler, TA, Hakim, RM. Early intervention improves mortality and hospitalization rates in incident hemodialysis patients: RightStart program. Clin J Am Soc Nephrol, 2(6), 1170-5, 2007
- Chertow, GM, Soroko, SH, Paganini, EP, Cho, KC, Himmelfarb, J, Ikizler, TA, Mehta, RL. Mortality after acute renal failure: models for prognostic stratification and risk adjustment. Kidney Int, 70(6), 1120-6, 2006
- Cho, KC, Himmelfarb, J, Paganini, E, Ikizler, TA, Soroko, SH, Mehta, RL, Chertow, GM. Survival by dialysis modality in critically ill patients with acute kidney injury. J Am Soc Nephrol, 17(11), 3132-8, 2006
- Ikizler, TA, Himmelfarb, J. Muscle wasting in kidney disease: Let's get physical. J Am Soc Nephrol, 17(8), 2097-8, 2006
- Ikizler, TA, Himmelfarb, J. Trials and trade-offs in haemodialysis vascular access monitoring. Nephrol Dial Transplant, 21(12), 3362-3, 2006
- Liu, KD, Himmelfarb, J, Paganini, E, Ikizler, TA, Soroko, SH, Mehta, RL, Chertow, GM. Timing of initiation of dialysis in critically ill patients with acute kidney injury. Clin J Am Soc Nephrol, 1(5), 915-9, 2006
- Pupim, LB, Cuppari, L, Ikizler, TA. Nutrition and metabolism in kidney disease. Semin Nephrol, 26(2), 134-57, 2006
- Pupim, LB, Majchrzak, KM, Flakoll, PJ, Ikizler, TA. Intradialytic oral nutrition improves protein homeostasis in chronic hemodialysis patients with deranged nutritional status. J Am Soc Nephrol, 17(11), 3149-57, 2006
- Yilmaz, MI, Korkmaz, A, Kaya, A, Sonmez, A, Caglar, K, Topal, T, Eyileten, T, Yenicesu, M, Acikel, C, Oter, S, Yaman, H, Aktug, H, Oguz, Y, Vural, A, Ikizler, TA. Hyperbaric oxygen treatment augments the efficacy of a losartan regime in an experimental nephrotic syndrome model. Nephron Exp Nephrol, 104(1), e15-22, 2006
- Basi, S, Pupim, LB, Simmons, EM, Sezer, MT, Shyr, Y, Freedman, S, Chertow, GM, Mehta, RL, Paganini, E, Himmelfarb, J, Ikizler, TA. Insulin resistance in critically ill patients with acute renal failure. Am J Physiol Renal Physiol, 289(2), F259-64, 2005
- Ikizler, TA. Effects of hemodialysis on protein metabolism. J Ren Nutr, 15(1), 39-43, 2005
- Ikizler, TA. Protein and energy: recommended intake and nutrient supplementation in chronic dialysis patients. Semin Dial, 17(6), 471-8, 2005
- Ikizler, TA, Schulman, G. Hemodialysis: techniques and prescription. Am J Kidney Dis, 46(5), 976-81, 2005
- Lim, VS, Ikizler, TA, Raj, DS, Flanigan, MJ. Does hemodialysis increase protein breakdown? Dissociation between whole-body amino acid turnover and regional muscle kinetics. J Am Soc Nephrol, 16(4), 862-8, 2005
- Majchrzak, KM, Pupim, LB, Chen, K, Martin, CJ, Gaffney, S, Greene, JH, Ikizler, TA. Physical activity patterns in chronic hemodialysis patients: comparison of dialysis and nondialysis days. J Ren Nutr, 15(2), 217-24, 2005
- Pupim, LB, Flakoll, PJ, Majchrzak, KM, Aftab Guy, DL, Stenvinkel, P, Ikizler, TA. Increased muscle protein breakdown in chronic hemodialysis patients with type 2 diabetes mellitus. Kidney Int, 68(4), 1857–65, 2005
- Pupim, LB, Flakoll, PJ, Yu, C, Ikizler, TA. Recombinant human growth hormone improves muscle amino acid uptake and whole-body protein metabolism in chronic hemodialysis patients. Am J Clin Nutr, 82(6), 1235–43, 2005
- Pupim, LB, Heimbürger, O, Qureshi, AR, Ikizler, TA, Stenvinkel, P. Accelerated lean body mass loss in incident chronic dialysis patients with diabetes mellitus. Kidney Int, 68(5), 2368–74, 2005
- Simmons, EM, Langone, A, Sezer, MT, Vella, JP, Recupero, P, Morrow, JD, Ikizler, TA, Himmelfarb, J. Effect of renal transplantation on biomarkers of inflammation and oxidative stress in end-stage renal disease patients. Transplantation, 79(8), 914-9, 2005
- Yenicesu, M, Yilmaz, MI, Caglar, K, Sonmez, A, Eyileten, T, Kir, T, Acikel, C, Bingol, N, Oguz, Y, Ikizler, TA, Vural, A. Adiponectin level is reduced and inversely correlated with the degree of proteinuria in type 2 diabetic patients. Clin Nephrol, 64(1), 12-9, 2005
- Eustace, Joseph A, Astor, Brad, Muntner, Paul M, Ikizler, T Alp, Coresh, Josef. Prevalence of acidosis and inflammation and their association with low serum albumin in chronic kidney disease. Kidney Int, 65(3), 1031–40, 2004
- Flakoll, Paul J, Kent, Pamela, Neyra, Roxanna, Levenhagen, Deanna, Chen, Kong Y, Ikizler, T Alp. Bioelectrical impedance vs air displacement plethysmography and dual-energy X-ray absorptiometry to determine body composition in patients with end-stage renal disease. JPEN J Parenter Enteral Nutr, 28(1), 13-21, 2004
- Himmelfarb, J, Le, P, Klenzak, J, Freedman, S, McMenamin, ME, Ikizler, TA, . Impaired monocyte cytokine production in critically ill patients with acute renal failure. Kidney Int, 66(6), 2354–60, 2004
- Himmelfarb, J, McMonagle, E, Freedman, S, Klenzak, J, McMenamin, E, Le, P, Pupim, LB, Ikizler, TA, The PICARD Group, . Oxidative stress is increased in critically ill patients with acute renal failure. J Am Soc Nephrol, 15(9), 2449–56, 2004
- Ikizler, T Alp, Sezer, M Tugrul, Flakoll, Paul J, Hariachar, Sree, Kanagasundaram, N Suren, Gritter, Nancy, Knights, Stephanie, Shyr, Yu, Paganini, Emil, Hakim, Raymond M, Himmelfarb, Jonathan, . Urea space and total body water measurements by stable isotopes in patients with acute renal failure. Kidney Int, 65(2), 725-32, 2004
- Ikizler, TA. Role of nutrition for cardiovascular risk reduction in chronic kidney disease patients. Adv Chronic Kidney Dis, 11(2), 162-71, 2004
- Mehta, RL, Pascual, MT, Soroko, S, Savage, BR, Himmelfarb, J, Ikizler, TA, Paganini, EP, Chertow, GM, . Spectrum of acute renal failure in the intensive care unit: the PICARD experience. Kidney Int, 66(4), 1613–21, 2004
- Oberg, B Payson, McMenamin, Elizabeth, Lucas, F Lee, McMonagle, Ellen, Morrow, Jason, Ikizler, T Alp, Himmelfarb, Jonathan. Increased prevalence of oxidant stress and inflammation in patients with moderate to severe chronic kidney disease. Kidney Int, 65(3), 1009–16, 2004
- Pupim, LB, Caglar, K, Hakim, RM, Shyr, Y, Ikizler, TA. Uremic malnutrition is a predictor of death independent of inflammatory status. Kidney Int, 66(5), 2054–60, 2004
- Pupim, LB, Flakoll, PJ, Ikizler, TA. Protein homeostasis in chronic hemodialysis patients. Curr Opin Clin Nutr Metab Care, 7(1), 89-95, 2004
- Pupim, LB, Flakoll, PJ, Ikizler, TA. Nutritional supplementation acutely increases albumin fractional synthetic rate in chronic hemodialysis patients. J Am Soc Nephrol, 15(7), 1920-6, 2004
- Pupim, LB, Himmelfarb, J, McMonagle, E, Shyr, Y, Ikizler, TA. Influence of initiation of maintenance hemodialysis on biomarkers of inflammation and oxidative stress. Kidney Int, 65(6), 2371-9, 2004
- Pupim, Lara B, Flakoll, Paul J, Levenhagen, Deanna K, Ikizler, T Alp. Exercise augments the acute anabolic effects of intradialytic parenteral nutrition in chronic hemodialysis patients. Am J Physiol Endocrinol Metab, 286(4), E589-97, 2004
- Pupim, Lara B, Ikizler, T Alp. Assessment and monitoring of uremic malnutrition. J Ren Nutr, 14(1), 6-19, 2004
- Simmons, EM, Himmelfarb, J, Sezer, MT, Chertow, GM, Mehta, RL, Paganini, EP, Soroko, S, Freedman, S, Becker, K, Spratt, D, Shyr, Y, Ikizler, TA, . Plasma cytokine levels predict mortality in patients with acute renal failure. Kidney Int, 65(4), 1357–65, 2004
- Chertow, Glenn M, Pascual, Maria T, Soroko, Sharon, Savage, Brandon R, Himmelfarb, Jonathan, Ikizler, T Alp, Paganini, Emil P, Mehta, Ravindra L, . Reasons for non-enrollment in a cohort study of ARF: the Program to Improve Care in Acute Renal Disease (PICARD) experience and implications for a clinical trials network. Am J Kidney Dis, 42(3), 507-12, 2003
- Danielski, Michael, Ikizler, T Alp, McMonagle, Ellen, Kane, Jane Conner, Pupim, Lara, Morrow, Jason, Himmelfarb, Jonathan. Linkage of hypoalbuminemia, inflammation, and oxidative stress in patients receiving maintenance hemodialysis therapy. Am J Kidney Dis, 42(2), 286-94, 2003
- Kalantar-Zadeh, Kamyar, Ikizler, T Alp, Block, Gladys, Avram, Morrel M, Kopple, Joel D. Malnutrition-inflammation complex syndrome in dialysis patients: causes and consequences. Am J Kidney Dis, 42(5), 864-81, 2003
- Neyra, R, Chen, KY, Sun, M, Shyr, Y, Hakim, RM, Ikizler, TA. Increased resting energy expenditure in patients with end-stage renal disease. JPEN J Parenter Enteral Nutr, 27(1), 36-42, 2003
- Pupim, LB, Ikizler, TA. Uremic malnutrition: new insights into an old problem. Semin Dial, 16(3), 224-32, 2003
- Pupim, Lara B, Evanson, James A, Hakim, Raymond M, Ikizler, T Alp. The extent of uremic malnutrition at the time of initiation of maintenance hemodialysis is associated with subsequent hospitalization. J Ren Nutr, 13(4), 259-66, 2003
- Yildiz, Alaattin, Oflaz, Huseyin, Pusuroglu, Hamdi, Mercanoglu, Fehmi, Genchallac, Hakan, Akkaya, Vakur, Ikizler, T Alp, Sever, Mehmet S. Left ventricular hypertrophy and endothelial dysfunction in chronic hemodialysis patients. Am J Kidney Dis, 41(3), 616-23, 2003
- Caglar, K, Fedje, L, Dimmitt, R, Hakim, RM, Shyr, Y, Ikizler, TA. Therapeutic effects of oral nutritional supplementation during hemodialysis. Kidney Int, 62(3), 1054-9, 2002
- Caglar, K, Hakim, RM, Ikizler, TA. Approaches to the reversal of malnutrition, inflammation, and atherosclerosis in end-stage renal disease. Nutr Rev, 60(11), 378-87, 2002
- Caglar, K, Peng, Y, Pupim, LB, Flakoll, PJ, Levenhagen, D, Hakim, RM, Ikizler, TA. Inflammatory signals associated with hemodialysis. Kidney Int, 62(4), 1408–16, 2002
- Himmelfarb, J, Evanson, J, Hakim, RM, Freedman, S, Shyr, Y, Ikizler, TA. Urea volume of distribution exceeds total body water in patients with acute renal failure. Kidney Int, 61(1), 317-23, 2002
- Himmelfarb, J, Stenvinkel, P, Ikizler, TA, Hakim, RM. The elephant in uremia: oxidant stress as a unifying concept of cardiovascular disease in uremia. Kidney Int, 62(5), 1524–38, 2002
- Ikizler, TA. Epidemiology of vascular disease in renal failure. Blood Purif, 20(1), 6-10, 2002
- Ikizler, TA, Morrow, JD, Roberts, LJ, Evanson, JA, Becker, B, Hakim, RM, Shyr, Y, Himmelfarb, J. Plasma F2-isoprostane levels are elevated in chronic hemodialysis patients. Clin Nephrol, 58(3), 190-7, 2002
- Ikizler, TA, Pupim, LB, Brouillette, JR, Levenhagen, DK, Farmer, K, Hakim, RM, Flakoll, PJ. Hemodialysis stimulates muscle and whole body protein loss and alters substrate oxidation. Am J Physiol Endocrinol Metab, 282(1), E107-16, 2002
- Pupim, LB, Flakoll, PJ, Brouillette, JR, Levenhagen, DK, Hakim, RM, Ikizler, TA. Intradialytic parenteral nutrition improves protein and energy homeostasis in chronic hemodialysis patients. J Clin Invest, 110(4), 483-92, 2002
- Pupim, LB, Kent, P, Caglar, K, Shyr, Y, Hakim, RM, Ikizler, TA. Improvement in nutritional parameters after initiation of chronic hemodialysis. Am J Kidney Dis, 40(1), 143-51, 2002
