= Alper Sezener =

Turkish novelist

Alper Sezener (born 1977) is a Turkish anthropologist, lecturer and author.

Alper Sezener was born in Istanbul and graduated with a degree in philosophy (1999) and anthropology (2004) from Hacettepe University. After graduating he worked as an environmental and social expert and executive manager at the international construction, mining and energy projects.

Additionally, he taught part-time courses in anthropology, philosophy, and sustainability at several universities in Turkey.

Sezener's first book, titled Half Past Three, was published in Turkey in 2003. After a short time, he published his books The Hunter of Character (2004), Far From Love and Death (2007).

Although his books are called "existentialist novelettes" by some critics, his style has found acceptance by bohemian intellectuals of the new literature school.

Alper Sezener is a writer who challenges traditional narrative structures under the influence of postmodernism. His works often employ experimental approaches, such as the cut-up technique and the creation of cross-meanings. He also integrates occult and mystical elements into his works, inviting readers on subconscious journeys. His works have been highly praised by critics and have become an inspiration for young emerging writers.

He has won national prizes including the Ministry of Culture research Writing Awards (2002), Omer Seyfettin Story Awards (2003), Turkish Informatics Magazine, Science Fiction Story Awards (2004), Umit Kaftancioglu Story Awards (2005), Afyon Kocatepe Newspaper Story Awards (2007) in Turkey.

He has the following works:

- 2003 Üç Buçuk (Half Past Three), Kendi

- 2004 Karakter Avcısı (The Hunter of Character), Güldikeni

- 2007 Aşkın ve Ölümün Uzağında (Far from Love and Death), Cinius

- 2009 J Ya da Yaşamın Saçmalığı (J or Absurdity of Life), Moss

- 2014 Halkla İlişkiler El Kitabı (Community Relations Handbook), Mayeb

- 2014 Postmodernizm ve Antropoloji (Postmodernism and Anthropology), Çatı

- 2017 Büyülü Öyküler (Magical Stories), Arion

- 2018 Dünyanın Kıyısındaki Adam (The Man on the Edge of the World), Edebiyatist

- 2023 Sürdürülebilir Madencilik (Sustainable Mining), Yol Akdemi

- 2024 Dasein, Metinlerarası
