= Nejat Alp =

Turkish musician

- Born: 9 November 1952 (age 72); Istanbul, Turkey
- Genres: Synthpop, new wave
- Occupation(s): Singer-songwriter, musician
- Instrument(s): Keyboards, synthesizer, percussion
- Years active: 1969–present

Nejat Alp (born 9 November 1952) is a Turkish musician who plays synth-driven Turkish ambient folk. He began his professional career in 1969 by playing bass for various supporting bands in the clubs of Istanbul. In 1978 he changed his primary instrument from bass to keyboards, and became a vocalist.

== Discography ==
- 1977 Mavi Boncuk (Blue Bead)
- 1980 Evlendiğin Gün (The Day You Have Married)
- 1984 Tavernada Nejat Alp (Nejat in da Club) (reached Multi-platinum sales)
- 1985 Boğaziçi Geceleri (Bosphorus Nights)
- 1985 Canımdan Can İste (Wanna live my lifetime babe?)
- 1986 Londra Konseri (London Concert-Live)
- 1987 Gökten Üç Elma Düşmüş (I discover gravity)
- 1988 New York Konseri (New York Concert-Live)
- 1991 Yasak Aşk (Forbidden Love)
- 1994 Nerdesin (Where Are You?)
- 2006 Berlin Konseri (Berlin Concert-Live)
- 2007 Bir Öpsem
- 2011 Nabza Göre Şerbet
- 2013 Can-I Gönülden
