= Oliver Hüsing =

German footballer (born 1993)

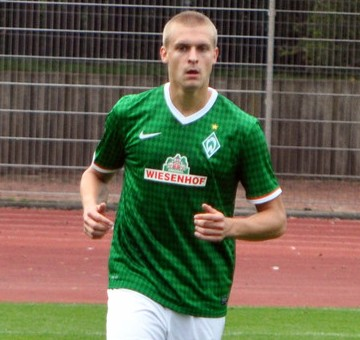
- Hüsing in 2013

Personal information
- Date of birth: 17 February 1993 (age 33)
- Place of birth: Bühren, Germany
- Height: 1.93 m (6 ft 4 in)
- Position: Centre-back

Youth career
- –2004: BV Bühren
- 2004–2012: Werder Bremen

Senior career*
Years	Team	Apps	(Gls)
2012–2016	Werder Bremen II	80	(5)
2014–2016	Werder Bremen	3	(0)
2015	→ Hansa Rostock (loan)	16	(2)
2016–2017	Ferencváros	19	(0)
2017–2019	Hansa Rostock	66	(7)
2019–2022	1. FC Heidenheim	78	(4)
2022–2023	Arminia Bielefeld	21	(1)
2023–2024	Hansa Rostock	15	(0)
- * Club domestic league appearances and goals as of 22 May 2024

Oliver Hüsing (born 17 February 1993) is a German professional footballer who plays as a centre-back.

== Career ==
=== Werder Bremen ===
After almost ten year in the club's youth ranks, on 1 April 2014, Hüsing signed a professional contract with Bundesliga club Werder Bremen until 2017. During the following Bundesliga season, he managed to earn a spot for the first team's squad in four Bundesliga matches, coming in from the bench even twice. In January 2015, he was loaned to 3. Liga side Hansa Rostock for the remainder of the season.

=== Ferencváros ===
After twelve years with Werder Bremen, Hüsing signed for Ferencváros in June 2016. The reported transfer fee was €300,000.

=== Hansa Rostock ===
In July 2017, Hüsing returned to Hansa Rostock on a free transfer.

=== Arminia Bielefeld ===
On 10 June 2022, Hüsing signed with Arminia Bielefeld.

== Career statistics ==
As of 1 July 2023

Appearances and goals by club, season and competition
Club	Season	League			Cup		Other		Total	
Club	Season	Division	Apps	Goals	Apps	Goals	Apps	Goals	Apps	Goals
Werder Bremen II	2011–12	3. Liga	1	0	—		—		1	0
Werder Bremen II	2012–13	Regionalliga Nord	17	1	—		—		17	1
Werder Bremen II	2013–14	Regionalliga Nord	18	0	—		—		18	0
Werder Bremen II	2014–15	Regionalliga Nord	15	3	—		—		15	3
Werder Bremen II	2015–16	3. Liga	29	1	—		—		29	1
Werder Bremen II	Total		80	5	—		—		80	5
Werder Bremen	2014–15	Bundesliga	2	0	0	0	—		2	0
Werder Bremen	2015–16	Bundesliga	1	0	0	0	—		1	0
Werder Bremen	Total		3	0	0	0	0	0	3	0
Hansa Rostock (loan)	2014–15	3. Liga	16	2	0	0	—		16	2
Ferencváros	2016–17	Nemzeti Bajnokság I	19	0	4	0	1 (Note: Appearance in the Champions League)	0	24	0
Hansa Rostock	2017–18	3. Liga	37	4	1	0	—		38	4
Hansa Rostock	2018–19	3. Liga	29	3	1	0	—		30	3
Hansa Rostock	Total		66	7	2	0	0	0	68	7
1. FC Heidenheim	2019–20	2. Bundesliga	19	0	1	0	—		20	0
1. FC Heidenheim	2020–21	2. Bundesliga	26	2	0	0	—		26	2
1. FC Heidenheim	2021–22	2. Bundesliga	33	2	1	0	—		34	2
1. FC Heidenheim	Total		78	4	2	0	0	0	80	4
Arminia Bielefeld	2022–23	2. Bundesliga	21	1	2	0	1 (Note: Appearance in relegation play-offs)	0	24	1
Career total			283	19	10	0	2	0	295	19
