= Alparslan =

Alparslan, or also Alpaslan, "heroic lion" in Turkish, may refer to:

== Given name ==
- Alp Arslan (1029–1072), Turkic ruler
- Alparslan Arslan (1977–2023), Turkish criminal
- Alparslan Çelik (born 1982), Turkish extremist
- Alparslan Erdem (born 1988), Turkish-German footballer
- Alparslan Türkeş (1917–1997), Turkish nationalist politician

== Surnames ==
- Ayşenur Alpaslan (born 1953), Turkish woman diplomat and former ambassador

== Places ==
- Alparslan, Dinar, a village in the district of Dinar, Afyonkarahisar Province, Turkey
- Alparslan, Kastamonu, a village in the district of Kastamonu, Kastamonu Province, Turkey

== See also ==
- Alpaslan, alternate spelling
