= Joseph Alper =

American chemist

Joseph Seth Alper (born 1941) is professor emeritus of chemistry at the University of Massachusetts, Boston. He is known for his work analyzing genetic discrimination and other issues related to human genetics research. He is a founding member of the Genetic Screening Study Group. He received his bachelor's degree from Harvard University in 1963 and his Ph.D. from Yale University in 1968. He did his postdoc in the laboratory of Robert J. Silbey at the Massachusetts Institute of Technology from 1968 to 1970.
