= Gökalp Kılıç =

German footballer

Personal information
- Date of birth: 21 January 2000 (age 26)
- Place of birth: Geislingen an der Steige, Germany
- Height: 1.83 m (6 ft 0 in)
- Position: Midfielder

Team information
- Current team: FV Illertissen
- Number: 20

Youth career
- SV Glück Auf Altenstadt
- –2015: SC Geislingen
- 2015–: 1. FC Heidenheim

Senior career*
Years	Team	Apps	(Gls)
2018–2021	1. FC Heidenheim	1	(0)
2019–2021	→ SSV Ulm 1846 (loan)	8	(2)
2021–2022	FC Memmingen	9	(1)
2022–	FV Illertissen	65	(7)
- * Club domestic league appearances and goals as of 13 October 2024

Gökalp Kılıç (born 21 January 2000) is a German professional footballer who plays as a midfielder for FV Illertissen.

== Career ==
In May 2018, Kılıç signed his first professional contract with 1. FC Heidenheim, lasting three years until 30 June 2021. He made his professional debut for Heidenheim in the 2. Bundesliga on 8 March 2019, coming on as a substitute in the 59th minute for Tim Skarke in the match against VfL Bochum, which finished as a 0–1 away loss.
