= Ayşenur Alpaslan =

Turkish diplomat

Turkey Ambassador to Estonia
- In office 1 October 2009 – 1 November 2013
- President: Abdullah Gül
- Preceded by: F. Şule Soysal
- Succeeded by: Ahmet Ülker

Turkey Ambassador to Chile
- In office 1 December 2001 – 17 December 2005
- President: Ahmet Necdet Sezer
- Preceded by: Türel Özkarol
- Succeeded by: Osman Ulukan

Personal details
- Born: Ayşenur Tekinöz; July 30, 1953 (age 73) Bursa, Turkey
- Education: Political Science
- Alma mater: Faculty of Political Science, Ankara University
- Profession: Diplomat

Ayşenur Alpaslan (born Tekinöz; 30 July 1953) is a Turkish diplomat and former ambassador of Turkey.

== Private life ==
Ayşenur Tekinöz completed her secondary education at TED Ankara College, and then graduated from the Faculty of Political Science, Ankara University in 1975.

With her marriage, she took the surname Alpaslan.

== Career ==
Ayşenur Tekinöz was appointed Second Secretary at the Turkish Embassy in London, United Kingdom in 1978.

Alpaslan served as Ambassador of Turkey to Chile between 1 December 2001 and 17 December 2005. Returned home, she was posted to the Department for Overseas Promotion and Culture in the Ministry as its Director General in 2006. She was appointed ambassador to Estonia taking office in Tallinn on 1 October 2009, where she served until 1 November 2013. Back to Turkey, she became chairperson of the Supervisory Board in the Ministry.
