= 2020–21 Hamburger SV season =

Hamburger SV
2020–21 season
- President: Marcell Jansen
- Executive Board: Frank Wettstein; Jonas Boldt
- Head coach: Daniel Thioune
- Stadium: Volksparkstadion
- 2. Bundesliga: 4th
- DFB-Pokal: First round
- Top goalscorer: League: Simon Terodde (24); All: Simon Terodde (24)
Home colours	Away colours

The 2020–21 season was Hamburger SV's 102nd season in existence and the club's third consecutive season in the second flight of German football. In addition to the domestic league, Hamburger SV participated in this season's edition of the DFB-Pokal. The season covered the period from 1 July 2020 to 30 June 2021.

== Players ==
=== First-team squad ===
As of 20 January 2021

Note: Flags indicate national team as defined under FIFA eligibility rules; some limited exceptions apply. Players may hold more than one non-FIFA nationality.

No.	Pos.	Nation	Player
1	GK	POR	Daniel Heuer Fernandes
2	DF	GER	Jan Gyamerah
3	DF	GER	Moritz Heyer
4	DF	NED	Rick van Drongelen
6	MF	GER	David Kinsombi
7	MF	GER	Khaled Narey
8	MF	TUN	Jeremy Dudziak
9	FW	GER	Simon Terodde
10	MF	GER	Sonny Kittel
11	FW	USA	Bobby Wood
12	GK	GER	Tom Mickel
14	MF	GER	Aaron Hunt
18	MF	GAM	Bakery Jatta

No.	Pos.	Nation	Player
19	FW	GER	Manuel Wintzheimer
20	MF	ALB	Klaus Gjasula
21	DF	GER	Tim Leibold (captain)
24	MF	BEL	Amadou Onana
26	GK	GER	Sven Ulreich
27	DF	GER	Josha Vagnoman
28	DF	GER	Gideon Jung
34	DF	GER	Jonas David
35	DF	GER	Stephan Ambrosius
37	DF	GER	Toni Leistner
42	MF	GER	Ogechika Heil
45	FW	GER	Robin Meißner

=== Out on loan ===
Note: Flags indicate national team as defined under FIFA eligibility rules; some limited exceptions apply. Players may hold more than one non-FIFA nationality.

No.	Pos.	Nation	Player
—	DF	SCO	David Bates (at Cercle Brugge until 30 June 2021)
—	MF	GER	Aaron Opoku (at Jahn Regensburg until 30 June 2021)
—	MF	ENG	Xavier Amaechi (at Karlsruher SC until 30 June 2021)

== Competitions ==
=== Overview ===
Competition	First match	Last match	Starting round	Final position	Record							
Competition	First match	Last match	Starting round	Final position	Pld	W	D	L	GF	GA	GD	Win %
2. Bundesliga	18 September 2020	23 May 2021	Matchday 1	4th	34	16	10	8	71	44	+27	47.06
DFB-Pokal	14 September 2020		First round	First round	1	0	0	1	1	4	−3	0.00
Total					35	16	10	9	72	48	+24	45.71

Source: Soccerway

=== 2. Bundesliga ===
==== League table ====
Pos	Team	Pld	W	D	L	GF	GA	GD	Pts	Qualification or relegation
2	Greuther Fürth (P)	34	18	10	6	69	44	+25	64	Promotion to Bundesliga
3	Holstein Kiel	34	18	8	8	57	35	+22	62	Qualification for promotion play-offs
4	Hamburger SV	34	16	10	8	71	44	+27	58	
5	Fortuna Düsseldorf	34	16	8	10	55	46	+9	56	
6	Karlsruher SC	34	14	10	10	51	44	+7	52	

Source: DFB
Rules for classification: 1) Points; 2) Goal difference; 3) Goals scored; 4) Head-to-head points; 5) Head-to-head goal difference; 6) Head-to-head away goals scored; 7) Away goals scored; 8) Play-off.
(P) Promoted

==== Results summary ====
Overall								Home						Away					
Pld	W	D	L	GF	GA	GD	Pts	W	D	L	GF	GA	GD	W	D	L	GF	GA	GD
34	16	10	8	71	44	+27	58	10	4	3	40	16	+24	6	6	5	31	28	+3

Source: Soccerway

==== Results by round ====
Round	1	2	3	4	5	6	7	8	9	10	11	12	13	14	15	16	17	18	19	20	21	22	23	24	25	26	27	28	29	30	31	32	33	34
Ground	H	A	H	A	H	H	A	H	A	H	A	H	A	H	A	H	A	A	H	A	H	A	H	H	A	H	A	H	A	A	H	H	A	A
Result	W	W	W	W	W	D	D	L	L	L	W	W	W	W	D	W	W	D	W	D	D	L	L	D	W	W	D	L	L	D	D	W	L	W
Position	4	1	1	1	1	1	4	4	4	4	4	2	2	1	1	1	1	1	1	1	1	1	4	2	2	2	2	2	3	3	4	4	5	4

A = Away; H = Home; W = Win; D = Draw; L = Loss

==== Matches ====
The league fixtures were announced on 7 August 2020.

18 September 2020 1	Hamburger SV	2–1	Fortuna Düsseldorf	Hamburg
18:30 CEST (UTC+2)	Terodde 45+2' (pen.), 60'; Onana (yellow card) 80'; Jung (yellow card) 90+4'	Report	Bodzek (yellow card) 73'; Ampomah (yellow card) 82' (yellow-red card) 90+1'; Zimmermann 90+3'	Stadium: Volksparkstadion; Attendance: 1,000; Referee: Christian Dingert

28 September 2020 2	SC Paderborn	3–4	Hamburger SV	Paderborn
20:30 CEST (UTC+2)	Correia (yellow card) 27'; Srbeny 34'; Führich 36', 38' (yellow card) 54'; Hünemeier (yellow card) 90+4'	Report	Wintzheimer 14'; Gyamerah (yellow card) 15'; Terodde 24', 57'; Hunt 82' (yellow card) 82'	Stadium: Benteler-Arena; Attendance: 300; Referee: Guido Winkmann

17 October 2020 4	Greuther Fürth	0–1	Hamburger SV	Fürth
13:00 CEST (UTC+2)		Report	Narey 45+3'	Stadium: Sportpark Ronhof Thomas Sommer; Attendance: 3,325; Referee: Martin Petersen

21 October 2020 3	Hamburger SV	3–0	Erzgebirge Aue	Hamburg
18:30 CEST (UTC+2)	Wintzheimer 17'; Kittel 57'; Narey 72'	Report		Stadium: Volksparkstadion; Attendance: 1,000; Referee: Christof Günsch

24 October 2020 5	Hamburger SV	3–1	Würzburger Kickers	Hamburg
13:00 CEST (UTC+2)	Terodde 65', 82'; Leibold (90#2)	Report	Dietz 40'	Stadium: Volksparkstadion; Attendance: 1,000; Referee: Daniel Siebert

30 October 2020 6	Hamburger SV	2–2	FC St. Pauli	Hamburg
18:30 CET (UTC+1)	Terodde 12', 84'	Report	Zalazar 35'; Makienok 82'	Stadium: Volksparkstadion; Attendance: 1,000; Referee: Daniel Siebert

9 November 2020 7	Holstein Kiel	1–1	Hamburger SV	Kiel
20:30 CET (UTC+1)	Bartels (yellow card) 74'; Mees 90+1'	Report	Heyer 43'	Stadium: Holstein-Stadion; Attendance: 0 Referee: (Germany) Sören Storks

22 November 2020 8	Hamburger SV	1–3	Bochum	Hamburg
13:30 CET (UTC+1)	Terodde 65' (pen.); Wood (yellow card) 81'	Report	Danilo Soares (yellow card) 17'; Žulj 35' (pen.); Blum (yellow card) 66' (goal) 78'; Chibsah 82'	Stadium: Volksparkstadion; Attendance: 0 Referee: (Germany) Tobias Reichel

29 November 2020 9	Heidenheim	3–2	Hamburger SV	Heidenheim an der Brenz
13:30 CET (UTC+1)	Kühlwetter 27' 44' 90'; Geipl (yellow card) 55'	Report	Kittel 16'; Leistner 24'; Onana (yellow card) 29'; Ambrosius (yellow card) 32'; Leibold (yellow card) 76'	Stadium: Voith-Arena; Attendance: 0 Referee: (Germany) Florian Badstübner

5 December 2020 10	Hamburger SV	0–1	Hannover 96	Hamburg
13:00 CET (UTC+1)	Kittel (yellow card) 14' (yellow-red card) 25'	Report	Weydandt 13'; Kaiser (yellow card) 78'	Stadium: Volksparkstadion; Attendance: 0 Referee: (Germany) Bastian Dankert

12 December 2020 11	Darmstadt 98	1–2	Hamburger SV	Darmstadt
13:00 CET (UTC+1)	Hermann (yellow card) 29' (yellow-red card) 74'; Kempe 78'; Holland (yellow card) 89'	Report	Wintzheimer (yellow card) 7'; Gjasula (yellow card) 36'; Ulreich (yellow card) 40'; Terodde 70' 87'	Stadium: Merck-Stadion am Böllenfalltor; Attendance: 0 Referee: (Germany) Nicolas Winter

15 December 2020 12	Hamburger SV	4–0	Sandhausen	Hamburg
18:30 CET (UTC+1)	Terodde 30' 67' (yellow card) 76'; Heyer (yellow card) 33'; Ambrosius (yellow card) 58'; Onana (yellow card) 64' (goal) 78'; Gjasula (yellow card) 74'; Vagnoman 90+4'	Report	Contento (yellow card) 78'	Stadium: Volksparkstadion; Attendance: 0 Referee: (Germany) Timo Gerach

21 December 2020 13	Karlsruher SC	1–2	Hamburger SV	Karlsruhe
20:30 CET (UTC+1)	Hofmann 14'; Heise (yellow card) 68' (yellow-red card) 77'; Wanitzek (yellow card) 90'	Report	Jatta 3'; Terodde (yellow card) 69' (goal) 82'; Kinsombi (yellow card) 70'	Stadium: Wildparkstadion; Attendance: 0 Referee: (Germany) Christof Günsch

3 January 2021 14	Hamburger SV	3–1	Jahn Regensburg	Hamburg
13:30 CET (UTC+1)	Kinsombi 21'; Dudziak (yellow card) 37'; Terodde 39'; Jatta 61'; Heyer (yellow card) 66'	Report	Besuschkow 33' (yellow card) 75'; Albers (yellow card) 42'; Vrenezi (yellow card) 51'; Wekesser (yellow card) 90+4'	Stadium: Volksparkstadion; Attendance: 0 Referee: (Germany) Lasse Koslowski
Note: Played behind Closed Doors

9 January 2021 15	1. FC Nürnberg	1–1	Hamburger SV	Nürnberg
13:00 CET (UTC+1)	Nürnberger 14'; Hack (yellow card) 74'; Krauß (yellow card) 83'	Report	Terodde 33'; Kinsombi (yellow card) 77'; Leibold (yellow card) 85'	Stadium: Max-Morlock-Stadion; Attendance: 0 Referee: (Germany) Felix Brych
Note: Played Behind Closed Doors

18 January 2021 16	Hamburger SV	5–0	Osnabrück	Hamburg
20:30 CET (UTC+1)	Kittel 16'; Jatta 41' 48'; Vagnoman 54'; Trapp 61' (o.g.)	Report	Reis (yellow card) 52'	Stadium: Volksparkstadion; Attendance: 0 Referee: (Germany) Daniel Schlager
Note: Played Behind Closed Doors

23 January 2021 17	Eintracht Braunschweig	2–4	Hamburger SV	Braunschweig
13:00 CET (UTC+1)	Kroos 9'; Bär 42'; Behrendt (yellow card) 88'; Diakhité (yellow card) 89'; Otto (yellow card) 90+2'	Report	Kinsombi 45+2' 65'; Terodde 51'; Hunt 59'	Stadium: Eintracht-Stadion; Attendance: 0 Referee: (Germany) Robert Kampka
Note: Played Behind Closed Doors

26 January 2021 18	Fortuna Düsseldorf	0–0	Hamburger SV	Düsseldorf
20:30 CET (UTC+1)	Hoffmann (yellow card) 10'; Danso (yellow card) 47'; Sobottka (yellow card) 58'	Report	Kittel (yellow card) 45'; Ambrosius (yellow card) 73'; Leibold (yellow card) 90+2'	Stadium: Merkur Spiel-Arena; Attendance: 0 Referee: (Germany) Benjamin Cortus
Note: Played Behind Closed Doors

30 January 2021 19	Hamburger SV	3–1	Paderborn	Hamburg
13:00 CET (UTC+1)	Heyer 8'; Kittel 21' 53'	Report	Michel 41'; Okoroji (yellow card) 60'; Ingelsson (yellow card) 67'	Stadium: Volksparkstadion; Attendance: 0 Referee: (Germany) Daniel Siebert (referee)
Note: Played Behind Closed Doors

5 February 2021 20	Erzgebirge Aue	3–3	Hamburger SV	Aue
18:30 CET (UTC+1)	Hochscheidt 26'; Fandrich 50'; Krüger 61'; Samson (yellow card) 76'	Report	Terodde 14' 30' (pen.); Kinsombi 22'; Ambrosius (yellow card) 60'	Stadium: Erzgebirgsstadion; Attendance: 0 Referee: (Germany) Florian Badstübner
Note: Played Behind Closed Doors

13 February 2021 21	Hamburger SV	0–0	Greuther Fürth	Hamburg
13:00 CET (UTC+1)	Jung (yellow card) 24'; Ambrosius (yellow card) 41'; Kittel (yellow card) 90+1'	Report	Ernst (yellow card) 50' (yellow-red card) 56'; Seguin (yellow card) 57'; Abiama (yellow card) 90+3'	Stadium: Volksparkstadion; Attendance: 0 Referee: (Germany) Sascha Stegemann
Note: Played Behind Closed Doors

21 February 2021 22	Würzburger Kickers	3–2	Hamburger SV	Würzburg
13:30 CET (UTC+1)	Hašek 19'; Douglas 30'; Sontheimer 54'	Report	Dudziak 72'; Wood 89'; Onana (yellow card) 45' (yellow-red card) 90'	Stadium: flyeralarm Arena; Attendance: 0 Referee: (Germany) Sven Waschitzki
Note: Played Behind Closed Doors

1 March 2021 23	FC St. Pauli	1–0	Hamburger SV	Hamburg
20:30 CET (UTC+1)	Ziereis (yellow card) 11'; Marmoush (yellow card) 31'; Reginiussen (yellow card) 49'; Benatelli (yellow card) 56'; Kyereh 88'	Report	Jung (yellow card) 35'; Leibold (red card) 90+5'	Stadium: Millerntor-Stadion; Attendance: 0 Referee: (Germany) Deniz Aytekin
Note: Played Behind Closed Doors

8 March 2021 24	Hamburger SV	1–1	Holstein Kiel	Hamburg
20:30 CET (UTC+1)	Ambrosius (yellow card) 18'; Terodde 23'; Gayamerah (yellow card) 25'	Report	Lee Jae-sung 8'; Hauptmann (yellow card) 45'; Lorenz (yellow card) 61'	Stadium: Volksparkstadion; Attendance: 0 Referee: (Germany) Tobias Reichel
Note: Played Behind Closed Doors

12 March 2021 25	Bochum	0–2	Hamburger SV	Bochum
18:30 CET (UTC+1)	Blum (red card) 35'; Tesche (yellow card) 74'; Losilla (yellow card) 89'	Report	Onana 28' (yellow card) 46'; Vangoman (yellow card) 41'; Jatta (yellow card) 55'; Narey 89'	Stadium: Vonovia Ruhrstadion; Attendance: 0 Referee: (Germany) Felix Brych
Note: Played Behind Closed Doors

20 March 2021 26	Hamburger SV	2–0	1. FC Heidenheim	Hamburg
13:00 CET (UTC+1)	Leibold 15' 50'	Report	Kleindienst (yellow card) 31'	Stadium: Volksparkstadion; Attendance: 0 Referee: (Germany) Christof Günsch
Note: Played Behind Closed Doors

4 April 2021 27	Hannover 96	3–3	Hamburger SV	Hanover
13:30 CET (UTC+1)	Haraguchi 56' 84'; Ducksch 68'	Report	Hunt 14' 34' 50'; Heyer (yellow card) 76'; Onana (yellow card) 82'	Stadium: HDI-Arena; Attendance: 0 Referee: (Germany) Florian Badstübner
Note: Played Behind Closed Doors

9 April 2021 28	Hamburger SV	1–2	Darmstadt 98	Hamburg
18:30 CEST (UTC+2)				Stadium: Volksparkstadion

22 April 2021 29	SV Sandhausen	2–1	Hamburger SV	Sandhausen
20:30 CEST (UTC+2)				Stadium: BWT-Stadion am Hardtwald

25 April 2021 31	Jahn Regensburg	1–1	Hamburger SV	Regensburg
13:30 CEST (UTC+2)				Stadium: Jahnstadion Regensburg

29 April 2021 30	Hamburger SV	1–1	Karlsruher SC	Hamburg
18:30 CEST (UTC+2)				Stadium: Volksparkstadion

10 May 2021 32	Hamburger SV	5–2	1. FC Nürnberg	Hamburg
20:30 CEST (UTC+2)				Stadium: Volksparkstadion

16 May 2021 33	VfL Osnabrück	3–2	Hamburger SV	Osnabrück
15:30 CEST (UTC+2)				Stadium: Stadion an der Bremer Brücke

23 May 2021 34	Hamburger SV	4–0	Eintracht Braunschweig	Hamburg
15:30 CEST (UTC+2)				Stadium: Volksparkstadion

=== DFB-Pokal ===
14 September 2020 First round	Dynamo Dresden	4–1	Hamburger SV	Dresden
18:30 CEST (UTC+2)	Stark 3'; Becker 16'; Daferner 53'; Mai 90+5' (pen.)	Report	Onana 89'	Stadium: Rudolf-Harbig-Stadion; Attendance: 10,056; Referee: Florian Badstübner

== Statistics ==
=== Appearances and goals ===
No.	Pos	Nat	Player	Total		2. Bundesliga		DFB-Pokal	
No.	Pos	Nat	Player	Apps	Goals	Apps	Goals	Apps	Goals
Goalkeepers
1	GK	(Portugal) POR	Daniel Heuer Fernandes	3	0	2	0	1	0
12	GK	(Germany) GER	Tom Mickel	0	0	0	0	0	0
	GK	(Germany) GER	Sven Ulreich	0	0	0	0	0	0
Defenders
2	DF	(Germany) GER	Jan Gyamerah	1	0	1	0	0	0
3	DF	(Germany) GER	Moritz Heyer	2	0	2	0	0	0
4	DF	(Netherlands) NED	Rick van Drongelen	0	0	0	0	0	0
5	DF	(Brazil) BRA	Ewerton	0	0	0	0	0	0
21	DF	(Germany) GER	Tim Leibold	3	0	2	0	1	0
27	DF	(Germany) GER	Josha Vagnoman	2	0	1	0	1	0
28	DF	(Germany) GER	Gideon Jung	2	0	0+2	0	0	0
34	DF	(Germany) GER	Jonas David	2	0	0+1	0	1	0
35	DF	(Germany) GER	Stephan Ambrosius	2	0	2	0	0	0
37	DF	(Germany) GER	Toni Leistner	1	0	0	0	1	0
Midfielders
6	MF	(Germany) GER	David Kinsombi	1	0	0+1	0	0	0
7	MF	(Germany) GER	Khaled Narey	3	0	1+1	0	0+1	0
8	MF	(Tunisia) TUN	Jeremy Dudziak	3	0	2	0	1	0
10	MF	(Germany) GER	Sonny Kittel	2	0	1	0	1	0
14	MF	(Germany) GER	Aaron Hunt	2	1	0+1	1	1	0
17	MF	(England) ENG	Xavier Amaechi	1	0	0	0	0+1	0
18	MF	(The Gambia) GAM	Bakery Jatta	1	0	0+1	0	0	0
20	MF	(Albania) ALB	Klaus Gjasula	3	0	2	0	1	0
24	MF	(Belgium) BEL	Amadou Onana	3	1	2	0	0+1	1
29	MF	(Germany) GER	Aaron Opoku	1	0	0+1	0	0	0
Forwards
9	FW	(Germany) GER	Simon Terodde	3	4	2	4	0+1	0
11	FW	(United States) USA	Bobby Wood	1	0	0	0	0+1	0
16	FW	(Austria) AUT	Lukas Hinterseer	3	0	0+2	0	1	0
19	FW	(Germany) GER	Manuel Wintzheimer	3	1	2	1	1	0
Players transferred out during the season

Last updated: 28 September 2020
Source: Competitions
