= 2021–22 Hamburger SV season =

Hamburger SV
2021–22 season
- President: Marcell Jansen
- Executive Board: Frank Wettstein; Jonas Boldt
- Head coach: Tim Walter
- Stadium: Volksparkstadion
- 2. Bundesliga: 3rd
- DFB-Pokal: Semi-finals
- Top goalscorer: League: Robert Glatzel (22); All: Robert Glatzel (27)
- Biggest win: Darmstadt 98 0–5 Hamburger SV
Home colours	Away colours	Third colours

The 2021–22 season was the 103rd season in the existence of Hamburger SV and the club's fourth consecutive season in the second division of German football. In addition to the domestic league, Hamburger SV participated in this season's edition of the DFB-Pokal.

== Players ==
=== First-team squad ===
As of 30 January 2022

Note: Flags indicate national team as defined under FIFA eligibility rules; some limited exceptions apply. Players may hold more than one non-FIFA nationality.

No.	Pos.	Nation	Player
1	GK	POR	Daniel Heuer Fernandes
2	DF	GER	Jan Gyamerah
3	DF	GER	Moritz Heyer
4	DF	GER	Sebastian Schonlau (captain)
6	MF	GER	David Kinsombi
7	MF	GEO	Giorgi Chakvetadze (on loan from Gent)
9	FW	GER	Robert Glatzel
10	MF	GER	Sonny Kittel
11	FW	DEN	Mikkel Kaufmann (on loan from Copenhagen)
12	GK	GER	Tom Mickel
14	MF	NED	Ludovit Reis
16	GK	SWE	Marko Johansson
18	MF	GAM	Bakery Jatta

No.	Pos.	Nation	Player
19	FW	GER	Manuel Wintzheimer
21	DF	GER	Tim Leibold
23	MF	GER	Jonas Meffert
27	DF	GER	Josha Vagnoman
28	DF	SUI	Miro Muheim (on loan from St. Gallen)
34	DF	GER	Jonas David
35	DF	GER	Stephan Ambrosius
36	MF	FIN	Anssi Suhonen
37	DF	GER	Toni Leistner
40	GK	GER	Leo Oppermann
41	DF	GER	Maximilian Rohr
44	DF	CRO	Mario Vušković (on loan from Hajduk Split)
48	FW	GER	Faride Alidou

=== Out on loan ===
Note: Flags indicate national team as defined under FIFA eligibility rules; some limited exceptions apply. Players may hold more than one non-FIFA nationality.

No.	Pos.	Nation	Player
—	MF	GER	Aaron Opoku (at VfL Osnabrück until 30 June 2022)
—	MF	GER	Ogechika Heil (at Go Ahead Eagles until 30 June 2022)

No.	Pos.	Nation	Player
—	MF	ENG	Xavier Amaechi (at Bolton Wanderers until 30 June 2022)
—	FW	GER	Robin Meißner (at Hansa Rostock until 30 June 2022)

== Transfers ==
=== In ===
No.	Pos.	Nation	Player
4	DF	GER	Sebastian Schonlau (from SC Paderborn)
9	FW	GER	Robert Glatzel (from Cardiff City, previously on loan at Mainz 05)
11	FW	DEN	Mikkel Kaufmann (on loan from Copenhagen)
14	MF	NED	Ludovit Reis (from Barcelona B, previously on loan at VfL Osnabrück)
16	GK	SWE	Marko Johansson (from Malmö)
23	MF	GER	Jonas Meffert (from Holstein Kiel)
28	DF	SUI	Miro Muheim (on loan from FC St. Gallen)

=== Out ===
No.	Pos.	Nation	Player
4	DF	NED	Rick van Drongelen (to Union Berlin)
7	DF	GER	Khaled Narey (to Fortuna Düsseldorf)
8	MF	TUN	Jeremy Dudziak (to Greuther Fürth)
9	FW	GER	Simon Terodde (to Schalke 04)
14	MF	GER	Aaron Hunt (free agent)
20	MF	ALB	Klaus Gjasula (to Darmstadt 98)
24	MF	BEL	Amadou Onana (to Lille)
26	GK	GER	Sven Ulreich (to Bayern Munich)
28	DF	GER	Gideon Jung (to Greuther Fürth)
42	MF	GER	Ogechika Heil (on loan to Go Ahead Eagles)
—	MF	GER	Aaron Opoku (on loan to VfL Osnabrück, previously on loan at Jahn Regensburg)
—	FW	ENG	Xavier Amaechi (on loan to Bolton Wanderers, previously on loan at Karlsruher SC)

== Pre-season and friendlies ==
Win Draw Loss Fixtures

30 June 2021 Friendly	Hamburger SV	1–0	FC Wacker Innsbruck	Grassau, Germany
18:00 CEST (UTC+2)	David 16'	Report		Stadium: Sportzentrum Brandstätt; Referee: Michael Bacher

7 July 2021 Friendly	FC Augsburg	2–2	Hamburger SV	Kirchheim bei München, Germany
13:30 CEST (UTC+2)	Danso 19'; Hahn 24'	Report	Wintzheimer 23', 26'	Stadium: Sportanlage Heimstetten

12 July 2021 Friendly	Hamburger SV	1–0	Silkeborg	Hamburg, Germany
11:00 CEST (UTC+2)	Jatta 47' (pen.)	Report		Stadium: HSV-Trainingsgelände

17 July 2021 Friendly	Hamburger SV	1–0	Basel	Hamburg, Germany
15:30 CEST (UTC+2)	Wintzheimer 39'	Report		Stadium: Volksparkstadion; Attendance: 4,034; Referee: Patrick Ittrich

11 November 2021 Friendly	Hamburger SV	7–4	Nordsjælland	Hamburg, Germany
14:00 CEST (UTC+2)				Stadium: HSV-Trainingsgelände

7 January 2022 Friendly	Karlsruher SC	1–3	Hamburger SV	San Pedro Alcántara, Spain
11:00 CET (UTC+1)	Van Rhijn 51'	Report	Glatzel 12' (pen.); Kinsombi 27' (pen.); Meißner 50'	Stadium: Marbella Football Center

28 January 2022 Friendly	Hamburger SV	1–5	Midtjylland	Hamburg, Germany
11:00 CET (UTC+1)	Jatta 11'	Report	Sisto 7'; Isaksen 33', 38'; Lind 35'; Brumado 58'	Stadium: Volksparkstadion

24 March 2022 Friendly	Viborg	5–4	Hamburger SV	Denmark
14:00 CET (UTC+1)	Bech 6', 36'; Bürgy 16'; Kramer 22'; Jatta 45'	Report	Kaufmann 56'; Glatzel 61', 63', 68' (pen.)

== Competitions ==
=== Overall record ===
Competition	First match	Last match	Starting round	Final position	Record							
Competition	First match	Last match	Starting round	Final position	Pld	W	D	L	GF	GA	GD	Win %
2. Bundesliga	23 July 2021	15 May 2022	Matchday 1	3rd	34	16	12	6	67	35	+32	47.06
Bundesliga promotion play-offs	19 May 2022	23 May 2022	First leg	Runners-up	2	1	0	1	1	2	−1	50.00
DFB-Pokal	8 August 2021	19 April 2022	First round	Semi-finals	5	1	3	1	7	8	−1	20.00
Total					41	18	15	8	75	45	+30	43.90

Last updated: 23 May 2022
Source: Soccerway

=== 2. Bundesliga ===
==== League table ====
Pos	Team	Pld	W	D	L	GF	GA	GD	Pts	Promotion, qualification or relegation
1	Schalke 04 (C, P)	34	20	5	9	72	44	+28	65	Promotion to Bundesliga
2	Werder Bremen (P)	34	18	9	7	65	43	+22	63	Promotion to Bundesliga
3	Hamburger SV	34	16	12	6	67	35	+32	60	Qualification for promotion play-offs
4	Darmstadt 98	34	18	6	10	71	46	+25	60	
5	FC St. Pauli	34	16	9	9	61	46	+15	57	

Source: DFB
Rules for classification: 1) Points; 2) Goal difference; 3) Goals scored; 4) Head-to-head points; 5) Head-to-head goal difference; 6) Head-to-head away goals scored; 7) Away goals scored; 8) Play-off.
(C) Champions; (P) Promoted

==== Results summary ====
Overall								Home						Away					
Pld	W	D	L	GF	GA	GD	Pts	W	D	L	GF	GA	GD	W	D	L	GF	GA	GD
34	16	12	6	67	35	+32	60	9	6	2	36	17	+19	7	6	4	31	18	+13

Source: DFB

==== Results by round ====
Round	1	2	3	4	5	6	7	8	9	10	11	12	13	14	15	16	17	18	19	20	21	22	23	24	25	26	27	28	29	30	31	32	33	34
Ground	A	H	A	H	A	H	A	H	A	H	A	H	A	H	H	A	H	H	A	H	A	H	A	H	A	H	A	H	A	H	A	A	H	A
Result	W	D	L	D	D	W	W	D	D	D	W	D	D	W	W	L	W	D	D	W	W	W	D	L	L	W	D	L	L	W	W	W	W	W
Position	3	5	8	7	10	9	6	7	7	8	6	7	7	6	5	7	3	3	5	5	4	2	2	4	5	5	6	6	6	6	5	3	3	3

Source: DFB
A = Away; H = Home; W = Win; D = Draw; L = Loss

==== Matches ====
The league fixtures were announced on 25 June 2021.

23 July 2021 1	Schalke 04	1–3	Hamburger SV	Gelsenkirchen
20:30 CEST (UTC+2)	Terodde 7'		Glatzel 53'; Heyer 86'; Jatta 90'	Stadium: Veltins-Arena; Attendance: 19,770; Referee: Timo Gerach

1 August 2021 2	Hamburger SV	1–1	Dynamo Dresden	Hamburg
13:30 CEST (UTC+2)	Reis 5'		Knipping 68'	Stadium: Volksparkstadion; Referee: Martin Petersen

13 August 2021 3	FC St. Pauli	3–2	Hamburger SV	Hamburg
20:30 CEST (UTC+2)	Becker 27'; Makienok 56', 58'		Kittel 43'; Glatzel 77'	Stadium: Millerntor-Stadion

22 August 2021 4	Hamburger SV	2–2	Darmstadt 98	Hamburg
13:30 CEST (UTC+2)	Schonlau 30'; Heyer 45'		Tietz 14' (pen.), 45+4'	Stadium: Volksparkstadion

28 August 2021 5	1. FC Heidenheim	0–0	Hamburger SV	Heidenheim
13:30 CEST (UTC+2)				Stadium: Voith-Arena

11 September 2021 6	Hamburger SV	2–1	SV Sandhausen	Hamburg
20:30 CEST (UTC+2)				Stadium: Volksparkstadion

18 September 2021 7	Werder Bremen	0–2	Hamburger SV	Bremen
20:30 CEST (UTC+2)				Stadium: Weserstadion

26 September 2021 8	Hamburger SV	2–2	1. FC Nürnberg	Hamburg
13:30 CEST (UTC+2)	Vušković (yellow card) 21'; Glatzel 34' 79'; Gyamerah (yellow card) 58'; Kittel (yellow card) 90+2'	Report	Dovedan (yellow card) 6'; Valentini 22' (pen.) (yellow card) 26'; Tempelmann 46'	Stadium: Volksparkstadion; Attendance: 22,500; Referee: Felix Zwayer

1 October 2021 9	Erzgebirge Aue	1–1	Hamburger SV	Aue
13:30 CEST (UTC+2)	Jonjić 23'; Zolinski (yellow card) 32'; Fandrich (yellow card) 60'; Messeguem (red card) 69'	Report	Wintzheimer (yellow card) 30'; Kittel (yellow card) 32'; Suhonen (yellow card) 79'; Carlson 90+4' (o.g.)	Stadium: Erzgebirgsstadion; Attendance: 7,750; Referee: Lasse Koslowski

16 October 2021 10	Hamburger SV	1–1	Fortuna Düsseldorf	Hamburg
20:30 CEST (UTC+2)				Stadium: Volksparkstadion

22 October 2021 11	SC Paderborn	1–2	Hamburger SV	Paderborn
18:30 CEST (UTC+2)				Stadium: Benteler-Arena

30 October 2021 12	Hamburger SV	1–1	Holstein Kiel	Hamburg
20:30 CET (UTC+1)				Stadium: Volksparkstadion

6 November 2021 13	Karlsruher SC	1–1	Hamburger SV	Karlsruhe
20:30 CET (UTC+1)				Stadium: Wildparkstadion

20 November 2021 14	Hamburger SV	4–1	Jahn Regensburg	Hamburg
13:30 CET (UTC+1)				Stadium: Volksparkstadion

28 November 2021 15	Hamburger SV	3–0	FC Ingolstadt	Hamburg
13:30 CET (UTC+1)				Stadium: Volksparkstadion

5 December 2021 16	Hannover 96	1–0	Hamburger SV	Hanover
13:30 CET (UTC+1)				Stadium: HDI-Arena

12 December 2021 17	Hamburger SV	3–0	Hansa Rostock	Hamburg
13:30 CET (UTC+1)				Stadium: Volksparkstadion; Attendance: 15,000; Referee: Michael Bacher

18 December 2021 18	Hamburger SV	1–1	Schalke 04	Hamburg
20:30 CET (UTC+1)				Stadium: Volksparkstadion; Attendance: 15,000; Referee: Deniz Aytekin

14 January 2022 19	Dynamo Dresden	1–1	Hamburger SV	Dresden
18:30 CET (UTC+1)				Stadium: Rudolf-Harbig-Stadion; Attendance: 1,000; Referee: Nicolas Winter

21 January 2022 20	Hamburger SV	2–1	FC St. Pauli	Hamburg
18:30 CET (UTC+1)				Stadium: Volksparkstadion; Attendance: 2,000; Referee: Sascha Stegemann

6 February 2022 21	Darmstadt 98	0–5	Hamburger SV	Darmstadt
13:30 CET (UTC+1)			Glatzel 5' (pen.), 10', 13', 88'; Wintzheimer 76'	Stadium: Merck-Stadion am Böllenfalltor; Referee: Matthias Jöllenbeck

12 February 2022 22	Hamburger SV	2–0	1. FC Heidenheim	Hamburg
13:30 CET (UTC+1)	Kittel 63', 78' (pen.)			Stadium: Volksparkstadion

19 February 2022 23	SV Sandhausen	1–1	Hamburger SV	Sandhausen
13:30 CET (UTC+1)	Testroet 15'		Kittel 59'	Stadium: BWT-Stadion am Hardtwald; Referee: Christof Gunsch

27 February 2022 24	Hamburger SV	2–3	Werder Bremen	Hamburg
13:30 CET (UTC+1)	Meffert 46'; Glatzel 80'	Report	Ducksch 10' (pen.), 76'; Füllkrug 51' (pen.)	Stadium: Volksparkstadion; Attendance: 25,000; Referee: Daniel Siebert

5 March 2022 25	1. FC Nürnberg	2–1	Hamburger SV	Nuremberg
20:30 CET (UTC+1)	Köpke 15'; Handwerker 88'	Report	Reis 25'	Stadium: Max-Morlock-Stadion; Attendance: 25,000; Referee: Matthias Jöllenbeck

19 March 2022 27	Fortuna Düsseldorf	1–1	Hamburger SV	Düsseldorf
13:30 CET (UTC+1)	Bodzek 85'	Report	Glatzel 90+3'	Stadium: Merkur Spiel-Arena; Attendance: 31,353; Referee: Marco Fritz

2 April 2022 28	Hamburger SV	1–2	SC Paderborn	Hamburg
13:30 CEST (UTC+2)		Report		Stadium: Volksparkstadion; Attendance: 27,136; Referee: Martin Thomsen

5 April 2022 26	Hamburger SV	4–0	Erzgebirge Aue	Hamburg
18:30 CEST (UTC+2)		Report		Stadium: Volksparkstadion; Attendance: 21,890; Referee: Arne Aarnink
Note: The match, originally scheduled on 12 March 2022, 13:30 CET, was postponed due to a COVID-19 outbreak in Hamburger SV's squad.

10 April 2022 29	Holstein Kiel	1–0	Hamburger SV	Kiel
13:30 CEST (UTC+2)		Report		Stadium: Holstein-Stadion; Attendance: 15,034; Referee: Daniel Schlager

16 April 2022 30	Hamburger SV	3–0	Karlsruher SC	Hamburg
20:30 CEST (UTC+2)		Report		Stadium: Volksparkstadion; Attendance: 24,892; Referee: Patrick Alt

23 April 2022 31	Jahn Regensburg	2–4	Hamburger SV	Regensburg
13:30 CEST (UTC+2)				Stadium: Jahnstadion Regensburg

30 April 2022 32	FC Ingolstadt	0–4	Hamburger SV	Ingolstadt
13:30 CEST (UTC+2)		Report		Stadium: Audi Sportpark; Attendance: 8,081; Referee: Robert Kampka

7 May 2022 33	Hamburger SV	2–1	Hannover 96	Hamburg
13:30 CEST (UTC+2)	Glatzel 13', 20'	Report	Kerk 22'	Stadium: Volksparkstadion; Attendance: 57,000; Referee: Arne Aarnink

15 May 2022 34	Hansa Rostock	2–3	Hamburger SV	Rostock
15:30 CEST (UTC+2)		Report		Stadium: Ostseestadion; Attendance: 26,150; Referee: Felix Brych

==== Promotion play-offs ====
As a result of their third place finish in the regular season, the club qualified for the play-off match with the 16th-place team in the 2021–22 Bundesliga to determine whether the club would be promoted to the 2022–23 Bundesliga.

19 May 2022 First leg	Hertha BSC	0–1	Hamburger SV	Berlin
20:30 CEST (UTC+2)	Stark (yellow card) 29'; Tousart (yellow card) 30'; Boyata (yellow card) 49'	Report	Reis 57'	Stadium: Olympiastadion; Attendance: 75,500; Referee: Harm Osmers

23 May 2022 Second leg	Hamburger SV	0–2 (1–2 agg.)	Hertha BSC	Hamburg
20:30 CEST (UTC+2)		Report	Boyata 4'; Boateng (yellow card) 31'; Jovetić (yellow card) 37'; Plattenhardt 63'; Tousart (yellow card) 83' (yellow-red card) 90+6'	Stadium: Volksparkstadion; Attendance: 57,000; Referee: Deniz Aytekin

=== DFB-Pokal ===
8 August 2021 First round	Eintracht Braunschweig	1–2	Hamburger SV	Braunschweig
18:30 CEST (UTC+2)	Ihorst 44'	Report	Gyamerah 29'; Glatzel 68'	Stadium: Eintracht-Stadion; Attendance: 6,167; Referee: Tobias Welz

26 October 2021 Second round	1. FC Nürnberg	1–1 (a.e.t.) (2–4 p)	Hamburger SV	Nuremberg
20:45 CEST (UTC+2)	Duman 59'	Report	David 45'	Stadium: Max-Morlock-Stadion; Attendance: 20,000; Referee: Bastian Dankert
	Penalties
	Geis (penalty scored); Duman (penalty scored); Tempelmann (penalty missed); Sørensen (penalty missed)		(penalty scored) Kinsombi; (penalty scored) Kittel; (penalty scored) Schonlau; (penalty scored) David

18 January 2022 Round of 16	1. FC Köln	1–1 (a.e.t.) (3–4 p)	Hamburger SV	Cologne
18:30 CET (UTC+1)	Hector (yellow card) 43'; Schindler (yellow card) 75'; Hübers (yellow card) 82'; Modeste 120+2' (pen.)	Report	Reis (yellow card) 90+3'; Glatzel 92'; Schonlau (yellow card) 120+1'	Stadium: RheinEnergieStadion; Attendance: 750; Referee: Daniel Schlager
	Penalties
	Özcan (penalty missed); Modeste (penalty scored); Ljubičić (penalty scored); Duda (penalty scored); Kainz (penalty missed)		(penalty scored) Kinsombi; (penalty missed) Kittel; (penalty scored) Vušković; (penalty scored) Gyamerah; (penalty scored) Schonlau

2 March 2022 Quarter-finals	Hamburger SV	2–2 (a.e.t.) (3–2 p)	Karlsruher SC	Hamburg
18:30 CET (UTC+1)	Glatzel 52', 90+1'; Kittel (penalty missed) 72'	Report	Heise 40'; Hofmann 50'	Stadium: Volksparkstadion; Attendance: 25,000; Referee: Felix Zwayer
	Penalties
	Schonlau (penalty missed); Vagnoman (penalty scored); Vušković (penalty scored); Glatzel (penalty scored)		(penalty scored) Gondorf; (penalty scored) Heise; (penalty missed) Wanitzek; (penalty missed) Van Rhijn; (penalty missed) O'Shaughnessy

19 April 2022 Semi-finals	Hamburger SV	1–3	SC Freiburg	Hamburg
20:45 CEST (UTC+2)	Meffert (yellow card) 37'; Reis (yellow card) 48'; Kaufmann (yellow card) 75'; Glatzel 88'; Heyer (yellow card) 90+1'	Report	Petersen 11'; Höfler 17', (yellow card) 63'; Grifo 35' (pen.); Günter (yellow card) 57'; Schlotterbeck (yellow card) 71'; Weißhaupt (yellow card) 90+3'	Stadium: Volksparkstadion; Attendance: 57,000; Referee: Deniz Aytekin
