= Xavier Amaechi =

English footballer (born 2001)

- Amaechi with Plymouth Argyle in 2026

Personal information
- Full name: Xavier Casmier Amaechi
- Date of birth: 5 January 2001 (age 25)
- Place of birth: Bath, England
- Height: 1.79 m (5 ft 10 in)
- Position: Winger

Team information
- Current team: Plymouth Argyle
- Number: 10

Youth career
- –2019: Arsenal

Senior career*
Years	Team	Apps	(Gls)
2019–2020	Hamburger SV II	6	(5)
2019–2023	Hamburger SV	10	(0)
2021	→ Karlsruher SC (loan)	7	(0)
2021–2022	→ Bolton Wanderers (loan)	10	(1)
2023–2025	1. FC Magdeburg	41	(6)
2025–	Plymouth Argyle	42	(6)

International career^{‡}
	England U15	10	(0)
2016–2017	England U16	6	(2)
2018	England U17	7	(2)
2019	England U19	3	(1)
2020	England U20	1	(1)
- * Club domestic league appearances and goals as of 13:05, 22 November 2026 (UTC) ‡ National team caps and goals as of 20:15, 13 October 2020 (UTC)

Xavier Casmier Amaechi (born 5 January 2001) is an English professional footballer who plays as a winger for EFL League One club Plymouth Argyle.

== Early and personal life ==
Amaechi was born in Bath on 5 January 2001. He is of Nigerian descent.

== Club career ==
After playing youth football for Arsenal, Amaechi signed for German club Hamburger SV in July 2019. He made his HSV debut on 11 August 2019 in the first round of the 2019–20 DFB-Pokal, coming on as a substitute in the 100th minute in extra time for David Kinsombi in the away match against Chemnitzer FC.

On 19 January 2021, Amaechi signed with 2. Bundesliga club Karlsruher SC on loan until the end of the season.

On 28 June 2021 he signed a six-month loan deal with Bolton Wanderers. Bolton were unable to afford his wages, and Hamburger SV refused to pay his wages during the loan spell – so Amaechi agreed to a pay cut during the loan as he specifically wanted to join Bolton over other options in England. On 20 July Amaechi fractured his metatarsal in a pre-season game against Preston North End, with the injury requiring surgery which would side-line him for a number of weeks. His debut finally came on 12 November when he came on as a late substitute in a 2–0 win against Crewe Alexandra. His first competitive start and goal came on 27 November when he scored Bolton's first goal in a 2–2 draw against Cheltenham Town. On 30 December, the loan was extended until the end of the season.

On 6 June 2023, Amaechi signed for 2. Bundesliga side 1. FC Magdeburg on a free transfer.

On 19 June 2025, Amaechi returned to England, signing for Plymouth Argyle.

== International career ==
He is an England youth international. He played 10 times England under-15 team.

In May 2018, Amaechi was included in the England under-17 squad as they hosted the 2018 UEFA European Under-17 Championship. He scored in the quarter-final against Norway but a yellow card in this match led to his suspension for the semi-final defeat against the Netherlands. He was subsequently included in the UEFA team of the tournament.

On 13 November 2019, Amaechi made his England U19 debut during the 4–0 2020 U19 EURO qualifying win over Luxembourg.

On 13 October 2020, Amaechi made his U20 debut and scored during a 2–0 victory over Wales at St. George's Park.

== Career statistics ==
As of match played 21 November 2026

Appearances and goals by club, season and competition
Club	Season	League			National Cup		League Cup		Other		Total	
Club	Season	Division	Apps	Goals	Apps	Goals	Apps	Goals	Apps	Goals	Apps	Goals
Hamburger SV II	2019–20	Regionalliga Nord	4	3	—		—		—		4	3
Hamburger SV II	2020–21	Regionalliga Nord	2	2	—		—		—		2	2
Hamburger SV II	Total		6	5	0	0	0	0	0	0	6	5
Hamburger SV	2019–20	2. Bundesliga	2	0	1	0	—		—		3	0
Hamburger SV	2020–21	2. Bundesliga	1	0	1	0	—		—		2	0
Hamburger SV	2021–22	2. Bundesliga	0	0	0	0	—		—		0	0
Hamburger SV	2022–23	2. Bundesliga	7	0	1	0	—		0	0	0	0
Hamburger SV	Total		10	0	3	0	0	0	0	0	13	0
Karlsruher SC (loan)	2020–21	2. Bundesliga	7	0	0	0	—		—		7	0
Bolton Wanderers (loan)	2021–22	League One	10	1	1	0	0	0	1 (Note: Appearance(s) in the EFL Trophy)	0	12	1
1. FC Magdeburg	2023–24	2. Bundesliga	16	1	3	1	—		—		19	2
1. FC Magdeburg	2024–25	2. Bundesliga	25	5	0	0	—		—		25	5
1. FC Magdeburg	Total		41	6	3	1	—		—		44	7
Plymouth Argyle	2025–26	League One	29	3	0	0	1	0	2	0	32	3
Plymouth Argyle	2026–27	League One	13	3	1	0	2	1	3	1	19	5
Plymouth Argyle	Total		42	6	1	0	3	1	5	1	51	8
Career total			103	18	8	1	3	1	6	1	133	21

== Honours ==
Individual

- UEFA European Under-17 Championship Team of the Tournament: 2018
