= Josha Vagnoman =

German footballer (born 2000)

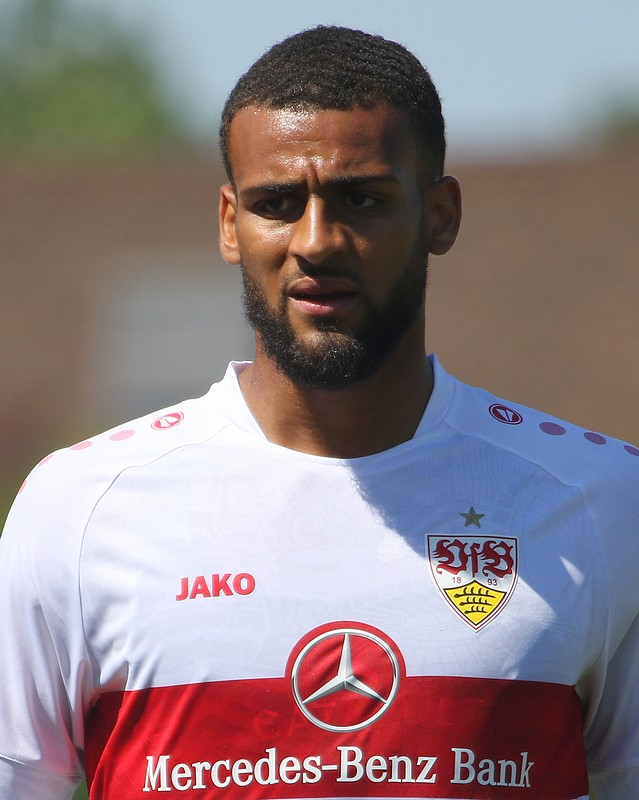
- Vagnoman with VfB Stuttgart in 2022

Personal information
- Full name: Josha Mamadou Karaboue Vagnoman
- Date of birth: 11 December 2000 (age 25)
- Place of birth: Hamburg, Germany
- Height: 6 ft 2 in (1.87 m)
- Position: Defender

Team information
- Current team: VfB Stuttgart
- Number: 4

Youth career
- 2009: SC Poppenbüttel
- 2009–2010: Hummelsbütteler SV
- 2010–2018: Hamburger SV

Senior career*
Years	Team	Apps	(Gls)
2018–2022	Hamburger SV	64	(5)
2018–2019	Hamburger SV II	10	(4)
2022–	VfB Stuttgart	102	(9)

International career^{‡}
2017	Germany U17	3	(0)
2018	Germany U18	1	(0)
2018	Germany U19	2	(0)
2019	Germany U20	1	(0)
2019–2023	Germany U21	15	(0)
2023–	Germany	3	(0)
Medal record
Representing Germany
UEFA European Under-21 Championship
Winner	2021
- * Club domestic league appearances and goals as of 17:30, 17 October 2026 (BST) ‡ National team caps and goals as of 20:40, 27 September 2026 (UTC)

Josha Mamadou Karaboue Vagnoman (born 11 December 2000) is a German professional footballer who plays as a defender for Bundesliga club VfB Stuttgart and the Germany national team. He developed through the academy of Hamburger SV and has represented Germany at youth level.

== Club career ==
=== Hamburger SV ===
==== Early career ====
Vagnoman joined Hamburger SV in 2010, and went through the different youth levels at the club. In February 2018, following impressive performances in the youth teams, newly appointed head coach Bernd Hollerbach promoted him to the HSV first-team squad for the forthcoming campaign.

On 10 March 2018, Vagnoman made his first-team debut in the Bundesliga match against Bayern Munich. He came off the bench in the 70th minute, replacing Walace in a 6–0 home loss. He became the youngest player to ever play in the Bundesliga for Hamburger SV when he debuted at the age of 17 years and 89 days. Under new coach Christian Titz, Vagnoman did not make more first-team appearances that season. However, he made 20 appearances in the Under-19 league for HSV, scoring two goals.

==== 2018–20 ====
Prior to the 2018–19 season, Vagnoman signed a new two-year contract with Hamburger SV, making him a permanent part of the first-team squad before his eighteenth birthday. Before the winter break, he made four appearances in the 2. Bundesliga for the club, making one start. Coach Titz and his successor, Hannes Wolf, preferred Gōtoku Sakai and Douglas Santos on the two back positions during this period.

In the latter part of the season Vagnoman saw slightly more playing time. He ended the season with 11 league appearances for the first team, adding to that another seven appearances and one goal for the reserves in fourth tier Regionalliga Nord.

At the beginning of the 2019–20 season, Vagnoman was benched under new head coach Dieter Hecking and mostly appeared for the reserves. As part of the Hamburger SV II team, he made three appearances in the Regionalliga Nord in which he scored three goals. After regular right-back Jan Gyamerah suffered a fibular fracture in mid-September, Vagnoman replaced him in the starting lineup in the following league game and made five straight appearances, in which he scored one goal. In October, he suffered a foot injury in a DFB-Pokal matchup against VfB Stuttgart which ruled him out for several months. In his absence, Khaled Narey took over as the third player to appear at right-back before Jordan Beyer arrived on loan during the January transfer window. In April 2020, Vagnoman recovered from his injury, and signed a four-year contract extension during the COVID-19 league suspension. When the league was resumed in mid-May, Vagnoman returned to the starting lineup as a right-back in a 2. Bundesliga match against SpVgg Greuther Fürth. He finished the season with 16 Bundesliga appearances in which he scored one goal.

==== 2020–22 ====
On the first matchday of the 2020–21 season, Vagnoman was in the starting line-up under the new head coach Daniel Thioune for the game against Fortuna Düsseldorf (2–1 win), but in the following week of practice he suffered a tear in the outer ligament and an inner ligament strain in the left ankle. This ruled him out for a few weeks and afterwards was placed on the bench behind Jan Gyamerah on his return on the fifth matchday and in the following games. Due to an injury to Gyamerah, Vagnoman returned to the starting line-up on 5 December 2020 in a 1–0 home loss to Hannover 96, and was a regular starter until the end of the first half of the season, scoring 2 goals. In the 4–2 win against Eintracht Braunschweig on 23 January 2021, Vagnoman was replaced at half-time after suffering a torn ligament in his right ankle. He made his comeback a month later. Due to a thigh strain, however, he missed the last two matches of the season. Vagnoman ended the season with 24 domestic league appearances, in which he scored 2 goals. HSV finished fourth for the third time in a row and once again missed promotion.

In the 2021–22 pre-season, Vagnoman tore a muscle fiber, which meant that he missed the first two games of the season. On the third matchday of the season, Vagnoman came on as a substitute for Jan Gyamerah, but again fell out with torn muscle tendon. He was expected to be sidelined for two months. He returned to first-team practice in late January 2022 – around 5 months after suffering the injury. On 27 February, he made his competitive return in a 3–2 home loss in the Nordderby to Werder Bremen, coming off the bench in the 82nd minute for Moritz Heyer.

=== VfB Stuttgart ===
On 9 July 2022, VfB Stuttgart announced the signing of Vagnoman on a four-year contract. He made his competitive debut for the club on 29 July, starting in a 1–0 away win over Dynamo Dresden in the DFB-Pokal. On 7 August, he made his Bundesliga debut for Stuttgart, starting on the opening matchday in a 1–1 home draw against RB Leipzig. He sustained an ankle injury during practice on 27 September, again sidelining him for an extended period. He returned to training one month later, but ankle issues kept him from returning to full strength as new head coach Bruno Labbadia took over the reins in December 2022.

== International career ==
Eligible for both Germany and Ivory Coast, Vagnoman has represented Germany at every age group from under-17 to under-20 level. In October 2017, he was included in the squad for the 2017 UEFA European Under-17 Championship as an alternate to the injured Kilian Ludewig. He made three appearances in the tournament for the under-17s.

In March 2018, Vagnoman made one appearance for the German under-18 team, and played another two matches for the German under-19 team in November 2018. He ended as runner-up to the Fritz Walter Medal in August 2019 in the under-19 category, behind Nicolas-Gerrit Kühn. Since September 2019, Vagnoman has been part of the Germany under-20 team.

On 17 March 2023, he received his first official call-up to the German senior national team for the friendlies against Peru and Belgium.

== Personal life ==
Vagnoman was born and raised in Hamburg, the son of an Ivorian father and a German mother.

== Career statistics ==
=== Club ===
As of match played 20 October 2026

Appearances and goals by club, season and competition
Club	Season	League			DFB-Pokal		Europe		Other		Total	
Club	Season	Division	Apps	Goals	Apps	Goals	Apps	Goals	Apps	Goals	Apps	Goals
Hamburger SV	2017–18	Bundesliga	1	0	0	0	—		—		1	0
Hamburger SV	2018–19	2. Bundesliga	11	0	2	0	—		—		13	0
Hamburger SV	2019–20	2. Bundesliga	16	1	1	0	—		—		17	1
Hamburger SV	2020–21	2. Bundesliga	24	2	1	0	—		—		25	2
Hamburger SV	2021–22	2. Bundesliga	12	2	3	0	—		2 (Note: Appearances in Bundesliga relegation play-offs)	0	17	2
Hamburger SV	Total		64	5	7	0	—		2	0	73	5
Hamburger SV II	2018–19	Regionalliga Nord	7	1	—		—		—		7	1
Hamburger SV II	2019–20	Regionalliga Nord	3	3	—		—		—		3	3
Hamburger SV II	Total		10	4	—		—		—		10	4
VfB Stuttgart	2022–23	Bundesliga	25	3	4	0	—		—		29	3
VfB Stuttgart	2023–24	Bundesliga	18	2	2	0	—		—		20	2
VfB Stuttgart	2024–25	Bundesliga	26	1	2	0	7 (Note: Appearances in UEFA Champions League)	1	0	0	35	2
VfB Stuttgart	2025–26	Bundesliga	27	1	4	0	8 (Note: Appearances in UEFA Europa League)	1	1 (Note: Appearance in Franz Beckenbauer Supercup)	0	40	2
VfB Stuttgart	2026–27	Bundesliga	6	2	1	0	3	0	—		10	2
VfB Stuttgart	Total		102	9	13	0	18	2	1	0	134	11
Career total			176	18	20	0	18	2	3	0	217	20

=== International ===
As of match played 27 September 2026

Appearances and goals by national team and year
National team	Year	Apps	Goals
Germany	2023	1	0
Germany	2026	2	0
Total		3	0

== Honours ==
VfB Stuttgart

- DFB-Pokal: 2024–25

Germany U21

- UEFA European Under-21 Championship: 2021

Individual

- Fritz Walter Medal U19 Silver: 2019
