= Sonny Kittel =

German-Polish footballer (born 1993)

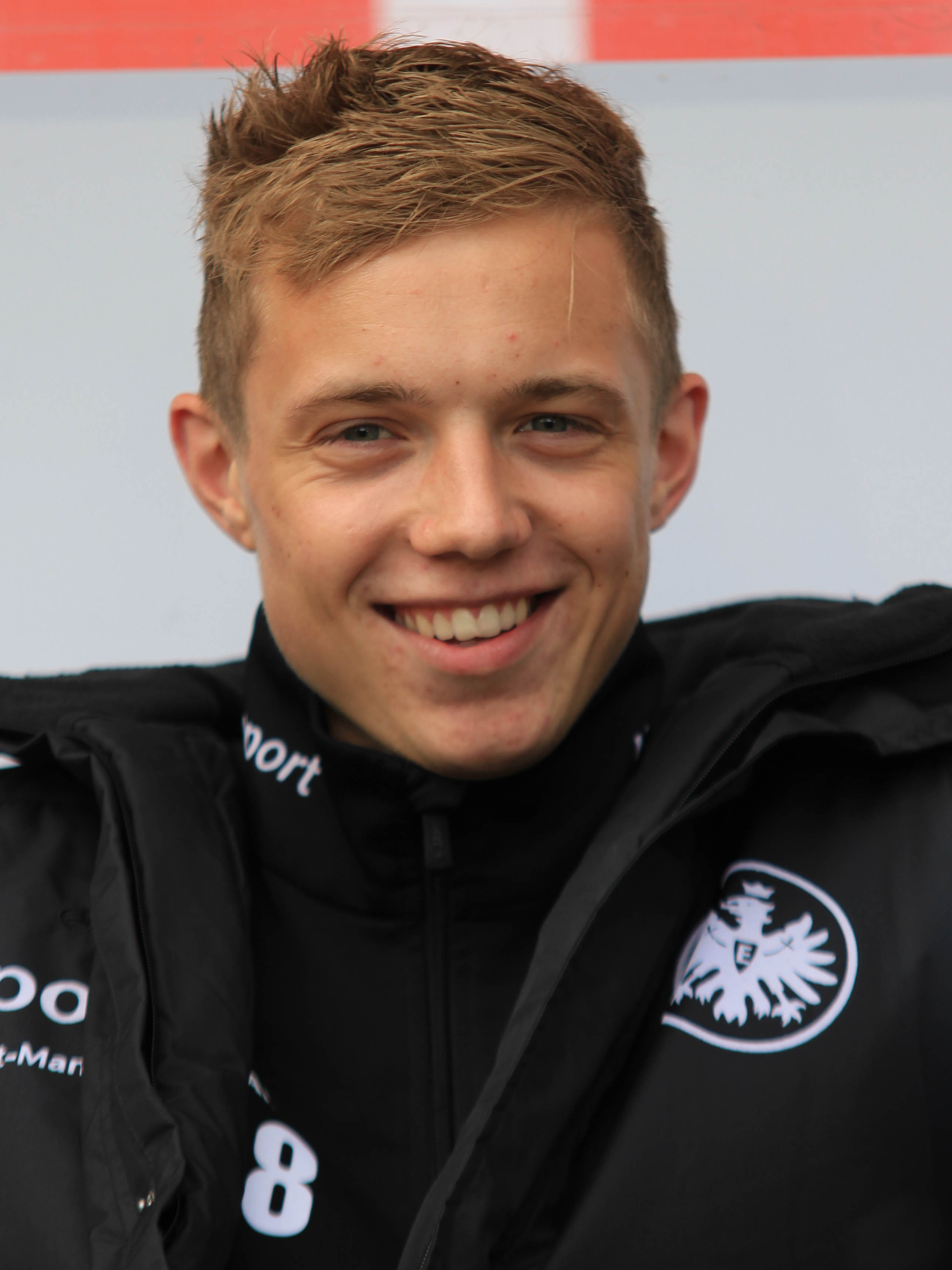
- Kittel with Eintracht Frankfurt in 2012

Personal information
- Full name: Sonny Andreas Kittel
- Date of birth: 6 January 1993 (age 33)
- Place of birth: Gießen, Germany
- Height: 1.79 m (5 ft 10 in)
- Position: Attacking midfielder

Youth career
- VfB Gießen
- 1999–2012: Eintracht Frankfurt

Senior career*
Years	Team	Apps	(Gls)
2010–2016	Eintracht Frankfurt	51	(3)
2012–2013	Eintracht Frankfurt II	8	(1)
2016–2019	FC Ingolstadt	86	(22)
2019–2023	Hamburger SV	130	(35)
2023–2024	Raków Częstochowa	11	(3)
2024	→ Western Sydney Wanderers (loan)	10	(1)
2024–2025	Grasshopper	25	(4)

International career
2009	Germany U16	4	(0)
2009–2010	Germany U17	12	(2)
2010–2011	Germany U18	4	(0)
2012–2013	Germany U20	3	(0)
- * Club domestic league appearances and goals as of 17 June 2025

Sonny Andreas Kittel (born 6 January 1993) is a German-Polish coach and former professional footballer who played as an attacking midfielder.

== Club career ==
After winning the German U17 championship with Eintracht Frankfurt in June 2010, Kittel was capped in the professional squad for the 2010–11 season. In Eintracht's first competitive match at SV Wilhelmshaven he was substituted. In the first 2010–11 home match he was also given some game time when he was substituted on for Caio in the 84th minute.

After playing for 2. Bundesliga side FC Ingolstadt for three seasons, Kittel transferred to Hamburger SV on 18 June 2019, signing a four-year contract.

On 20 July 2023, Kittel signed a three-year deal with defending Ekstraklasa champions Raków Częstochowa.

Kittel went on loan to the Western Sydney Wanderers for the second half of the 2023–24 A-League season.

On 24 August 2024, he signed with Swiss Super League side Grasshopper Club Zurich for an undisclosed fee. He joined the Swiss record champions on a one-year contract, with an option to extend for a further year. He debuted on 13 September 2024, in a 2–0 victory in the Swiss Cup against FC Thun, where he also scored the first goal. He also scored a brace in a 5–0 win against Yverdon-Sport on 14 May 2025. On 17 June 2025, Grasshoppers announced that they would not activate the option to extend his contract and Kittel would depart the club.

== International career ==
Kittel expressed in November 2017 to the Germany national youth football team his desire to play in the Poland national youth football team levels as his parents come from Poland.

== Career statistics ==
As of 31 May 2025

Appearances and goals by club, season and competition
Club	Season	League			National cup (Note: Includes DFB-Pokal, Polish Cup, Swiss Cup)		Continental		Other		Total	
Club	Season	Division	Apps	Goals	Apps	Goals	Apps	Goals	Apps	Goals	Apps	Goals
Eintracht Frankfurt	2010–11	Bundesliga	8	0	2	0	—		—		10	0
Eintracht Frankfurt	2011–12	2. Bundesliga	11	3	—		—		—		11	3
Eintracht Frankfurt	2012–13	Bundesliga	6	0	0	0	—		—		6	0
Eintracht Frankfurt	2013–14	Bundesliga	0	0	0	0	1 (Note: Appearances in UEFA Europa League)	0	—		1	0
Eintracht Frankfurt	2014–15	Bundesliga	18	0	0	0	—		—		18	0
Eintracht Frankfurt	2015–16	Bundesliga	8	0	—		—		—		8	0
Eintracht Frankfurt	Total		51	3	2	0	1	0	—		54	3
FC Ingolstadt	2016–17	Bundesliga	20	2	1	0	—		—		21	2
FC Ingolstadt	2017–18	2. Bundesliga	33	10	2	0	—		—		35	10
FC Ingolstadt	2018–19	2. Bundesliga	33	10	1	1	—		—		34	11
FC Ingolstadt	Total		86	22	4	1	—		—		90	23
Hamburger SV	2019–20	2. Bundesliga	31	11	2	1	—		—		33	12
Hamburger SV	2020–21	2. Bundesliga	31	9	1	0	—		—		32	9
Hamburger SV	2021–22	2. Bundesliga	35	9	5	0	—		—		40	9
Hamburger SV	2022–23	2. Bundesliga	33	6	2	0	—		—		35	6
Hamburger SV	Total		130	35	10	1	—		—		140	36
Raków Częstochowa	2023–24	Ekstraklasa	11	3	1	0	10 (Note: Five appearances in UEFA Champions League, five appearances in UEFA Europa League)	1	—		22	4
Western Sydney Wanderers (loan)	2023–24	A-League Men	10	1	—		—		—		10	1
Grasshopper	2024–25	Super League	25	4	2	1	—		1 (Note: Appearances in the relegation playoff)	0	28	5
Career total			313	68	19	3	11	1	1	0	344	72

== Honours ==
Individual

- Fritz Walter Medal U18 Silver: 2011
