= Manuel Wintzheimer =

German footballer

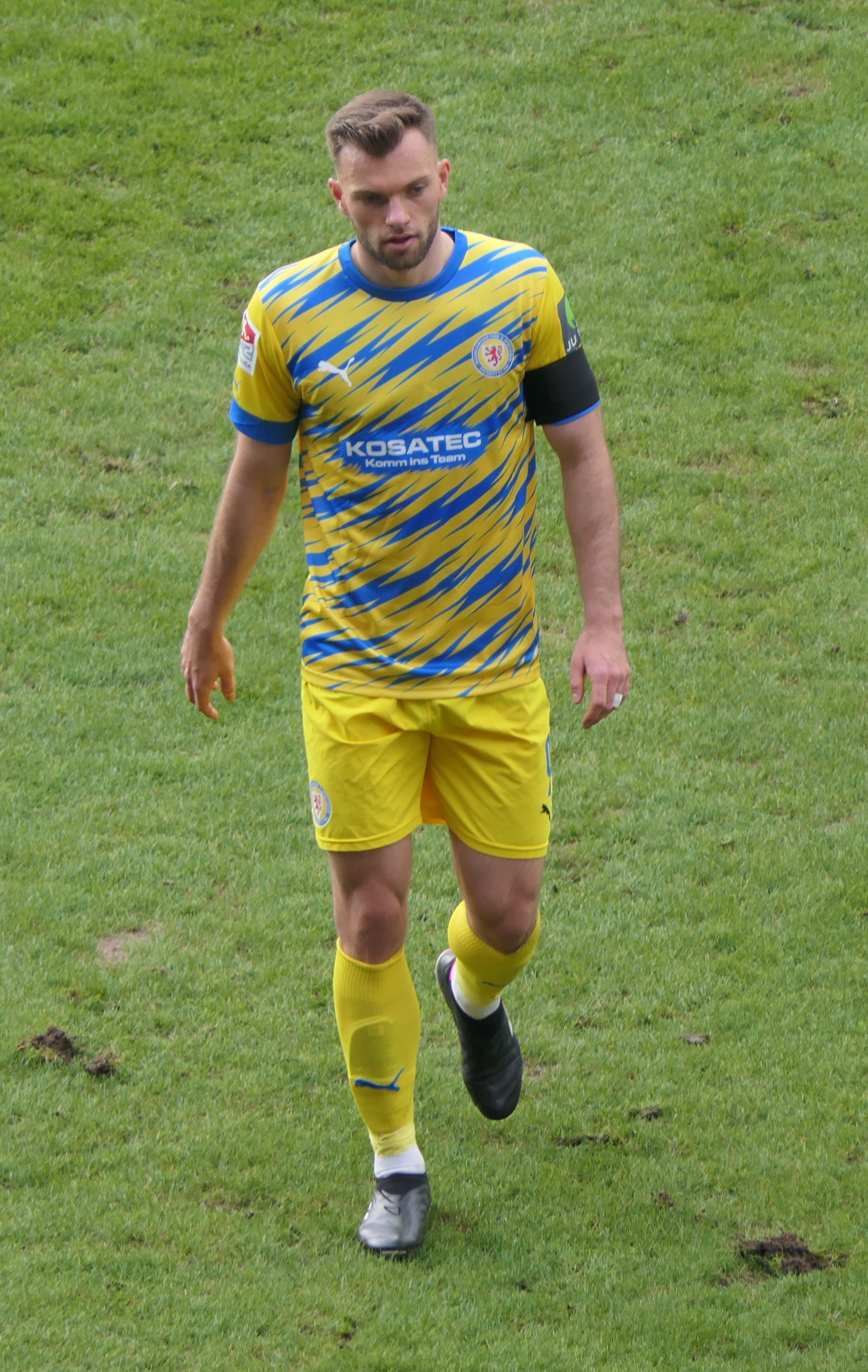

Personal information
- Full name: Manuel Paul Wintzheimer
- Date of birth: 10 January 1999 (age 27)
- Place of birth: Arnstein, Germany
- Height: 1.80 m (5 ft 11 in)
- Position: Centre-forward

Team information
- Current team: 1. FC Schweinfurt
- Number: 25

Youth career
- 1. FC Arnstein
- –2010: 1. FC Schweinfurt
- 2010–2013: Greuther Fürth
- 2013–2018: Bayern Munich

Senior career*
Years	Team	Apps	(Gls)
2017–2018	Bayern Munich II	5	(4)
2018–2022	Hamburger SV	67	(8)
2018–2019	Hamburger SV II	16	(5)
2019–2020	→ VfL Bochum (loan)	20	(3)
2022–2025	1. FC Nürnberg	11	(1)
2023	→ Eintracht Braunschweig (loan)	14	(3)
2023–2024	→ Arminia Bielefeld (loan)	30	(1)
2024–2025	→ Rot-Weiss Essen (loan)	16	(2)
2025–	1. FC Schweinfurt	31	(3)

International career^{‡}
2013–2014	Germany U15	4	(0)
2015–2016	Germany U17	4	(2)
2016–2017	Germany U18	6	(1)
2017–2018	Germany U19	8	(5)
2018–2019	Germany U20	7	(0)
2020	Germany U21	2	(1)
- * Club domestic league appearances and goals as of 30 May 2026 ‡ National team caps and goals as of 19:08, 17 November 2020 (UTC)

Manuel Paul Wintzheimer (born 10 January 1999) is a German footballer who plays as a centre-forward for club 1. FC Schweinfurt.

== Club career ==
=== Youth career ===
Wintzheimer began his youth career at hometown club 1. FC Arnstein, before moving on to the youth academy of 1. FC Schweinfurt. In 2010, he then moved to Greuther Fürth, before moving in 2013 to the youth academy of Bayern Munich.

Wintzheimer began in Bayern's under-17 team for the 2015–16 season, scoring 23 goals in 18 matches, before moving up to the under-19 team for the 2016–17 season. In 2017, Wintzheimer won the 2016–17 A-Junioren Bundesliga Süd/Südwest with the under-19 team, scoring 14 times during the season. The team went on to advance to the final of the A-Junioren Bundesliga championship round, before losing to Borussia Dortmund 8–7 on penalties.

=== Bayern Munich ===
Wintzheimer began his senior career with Bayern Munich II in the 2017–18 season, making his debut in the Regionalliga Bayern on 14 July 2017, opening the scoring in a 5–0 Bavarian derby home win against FC Ingolstadt II.

=== Hamburger SV ===
On 1 May 2018, it was confirmed that Wintzheimer would join 2. Bundesliga club Hamburger SV for the 2018–19 season. He made his professional debut for Hamburg in the 2. Bundesliga on 23 December 2018, coming on as a substitute in the 68th minute for Hwang Hee-chan in the 1–3 away loss against Holstein Kiel.

On 2 September 2019, Wintzheimer joined VfL Bochum on loan until the end of 2019–20 season.

=== 1. FC Nürnberg ===
On 17 May 2022, it was confirmed that Wintzheimer would join 2. Bundesliga club 1. FC Nürnberg for the 2022–23 season on a free transfer. On 7 January 2023, Wintzheimer was loaned by Eintracht Braunschweig. On 5 July 2023, he moved on a new loan to Arminia Bielefeld. On 1 August 2024, Wintzheimer was loaned to Rot-Weiss Essen.

== International career ==
=== Youth ===
Wintzheimer has progressed through the German youth national teams, making his debut for the under-19 team on 31 August 2017 in an away friendly match against Switzerland, with the match finishing as a 0–0 draw.

== Career statistics ==
=== Club ===
As of 10 December 2021

Club	Season	League			Cup		Total	
Club	Season	Division	Apps	Goals	Apps	Goals	Apps	Goals
Bayern Munich II	2017–18	Regionalliga Bayern	5	4	—		5	4
Bayern Munich II	Total		5	4	0	0	5	4
Hamburger SV	2018–19	2. Bundesliga	7	3	0	0	7	3
Hamburger SV	2019–20	2. Bundesliga	1	0	1	0	2	0
Hamburger SV	2020–21	2. Bundesliga	32	3	1	0	33	3
Hamburger SV	2021–22	2. Bundesliga	14	1	2	0	16	1
Hamburger SV	Total		54	7	4	0	58	7
Hamburger SV II	2018–19	Regionalliga Nord	16	5	—		16	5
Hamburger SV II	Total		16	5	0	0	16	5
VfL Bochum	2019–20	2. Bundesliga	20	3	1	0	21	3
VfL Bochum	Total		20	3	1	0	21	3
Career totals			95	19	5	0	100	19

== Honours ==
=== Individual ===
- Fritz Walter Medal U19 bronze: 2018
