= Sebastian Schonlau =

German footballer

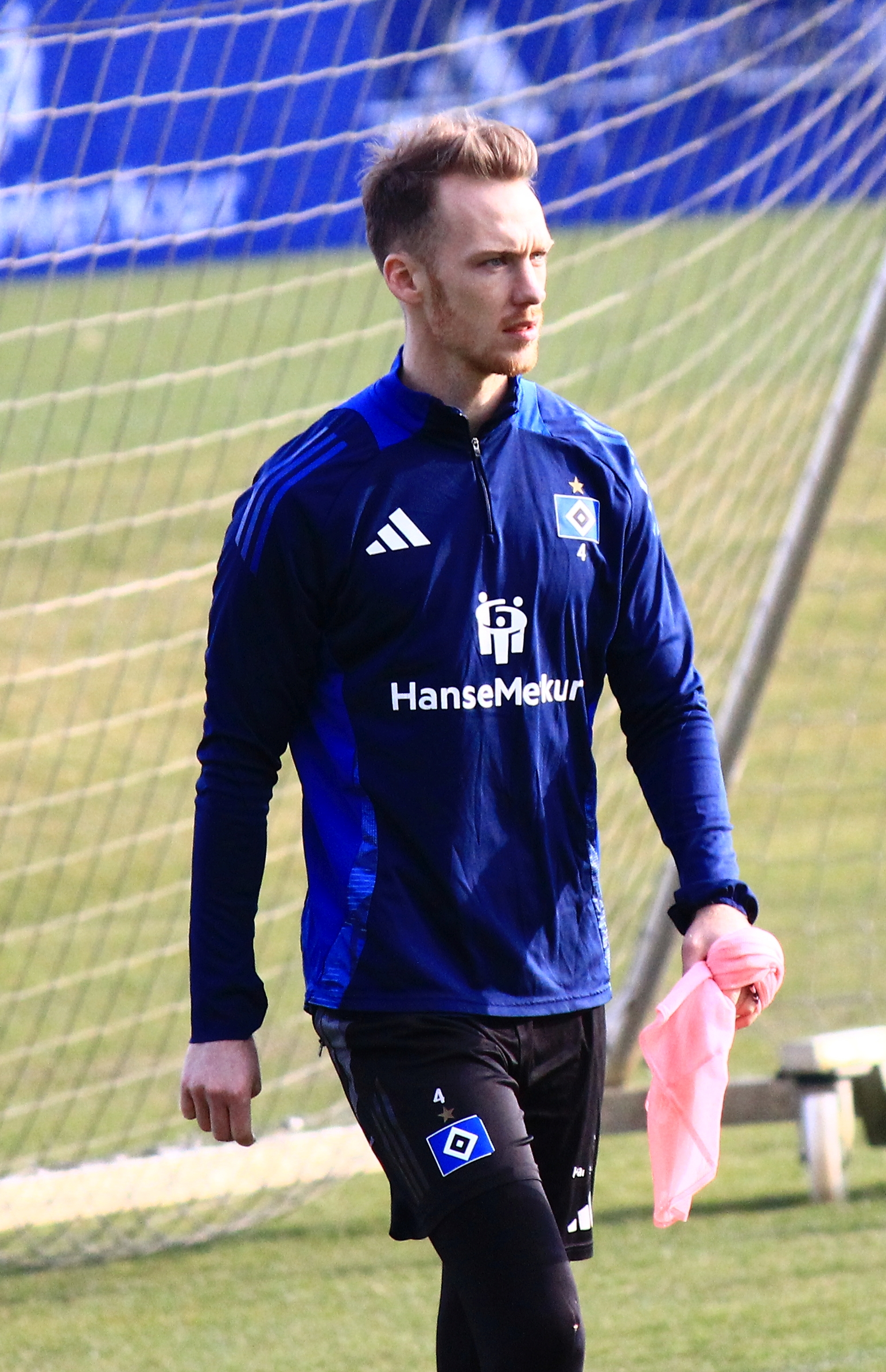
- Schonlau in 2025 with Hamburger SV

Personal information
- Date of birth: 5 August 1994 (age 32)
- Place of birth: Warburg, Germany
- Height: 1.85 m (6 ft 1 in)
- Positions: Centre-back; defensive midfielder

Team information
- Current team: Holstein Kiel
- Number: 4

Youth career
- –2007: SC Warburg 08
- 2007–2010: SC Paderborn
- 2010–2012: SC Warburg 08
- 2012–2014: SC Paderborn

Senior career*
Years	Team	Apps	(Gls)
2014–2021	SC Paderborn	157	(8)
2014–2015	→ SC Verl (loan)	25	(0)
2021–2025	Hamburger SV	102	(5)
2025–2026	Vancouver Whitecaps FC	1	(0)
2025	Whitecaps FC 2	1	(0)
2026–	Holstein Kiel	0	(0)
- * Club domestic league appearances and goals as of 23 May 2026

Sebastian Schonlau (born 5 August 1994) is a German professional footballer who plays as a centre-back or defensive midfielder for 2. Bundesliga club Holstein Kiel.

== Early life ==
Scholau was born on 5 August 1994 in Warburg. He used to live in Paderborn, and started studying economics in the city starting October 2014.

== Career ==
=== SC Paderborn ===
==== 2012–14: Youth team ====
Schonlau received a professional contract from 2. Bundesliga club SC Paderborn 07 in December 2012 that would expire in June 2015, with an option for another year, despite his old club SC Warburg 08 wanting to let him go in that time for his stature and weight.

At the end of the 2012–13 season, Schonlau made bench appearances in matches against Dynamo Dresden and MSV Duisburg, though, was not subbed on in any of these matches.

In the following season, Schonlau made more bench appearances, though, was not brought on just like the previous season.

==== 2014–15: Loan to SC Verl ====
Before the 2014–15 season, Schonlau extended his contract to 30 June 2016, and was loaned to SC Verl for the 2014–15 season to gain more experience. He made his debut in a 1–2 win playing in defensive midfield against the second team of Borussia Mönchengladbach. During the season, Schonlau had several minor injuries, which lessed his opportunities in playing with the team.

==== 2015–2021: First team ====
Once Schonlau returned to Paderborn, he made his debut in the 84th minute in a 1–2 win against Fortuna Düsseldorf, coming on for Mahir Sağlık.

=== Hamburger SV ===
On 17 May 2021, Schonlau signed a three-year contract to join fellow 2. Bundesliga team Hamburger SV on a free, and was the club's first transfer for the 2021–22 season. Around a month later in July, he was named captain (thus making previous captain Tim Leibold vice-captain), and first wore the captain's armband in a match against FC Basel.

In the 2023–24 season, Schonlau suffered a calf injury in a match against SV Elversberg and was subbed off on the 74th minute, subsequently limiting his opportunities for that season.

=== Vancouver Whitecaps ===
On 20 August 2025, Schonlau signed with Vancouver Whitecaps in Major League Soccer. On 4 July 2026, Schonlau and Vancouver mutually agreed to terminate his contract.

=== Holstein Kiel ===
On 4 July 2026, Schonlau returned to Germany and joined 2. Bundesliga club Holstein Kiel.

== Career statistics ==
As of match played 18 May 2025

Appearances and goals by club, season and competition
Club	Season	League			DFB-Pokal		Other		Total	
Club	Season	Division	Apps	Goals	Apps	Goals	Apps	Goals	Apps	Goals
SC Paderborn	2014–15	2. Bundesliga	0	0	0	0	—		0	0
SC Paderborn	2015–16	2. Bundesliga	8	0	—		—		8	0
SC Paderborn	2016–17	3. Liga	30	1	1	0	—		31	1
SC Paderborn	2017–18	3. Liga	35	3	4	0	—		39	3
SC Paderborn	2018–19	2. Bundesliga	29	1	3	0	—		32	1
SC Paderborn	2019–20	Bundesliga	23	2	1	0	—		24	2
SC Paderborn	2020–21	2. Bundesliga	32	1	3	0	—		35	1
SC Paderborn	Total		157	8	12	0	—		169	8
SC Verl (loan)	2014–15	Regionalliga Nord	25	0	—		—		25	0
Hamburger SV	2021–22	2. Bundesliga	33	4	5	0	2 (Note: Appearances in 2. Bundesliga promotion play-offs)	0	40	4
Hamburger SV	2022–23	2. Bundesliga	30	0	1	1	2	0	33	1
Hamburger SV	2023–24	2. Bundesliga	16	1	1	0	—		17	1
Hamburger SV	2024–25	2. Bundesliga	23	0	2	0	—		25	0
Hamburger SV	2025–26	Bundesliga	0	0	0	0	—		0	0
Hamburger SV	Total		102	5	9	0	4	0	115	5
Career total			284	13	21	1	4	0	309	14
