= Jan Gyamerah =

Ghanaian footballer (born 1995)

Personal information
- Date of birth: 18 June 1995 (age 31)
- Place of birth: Berlin, Germany
- Height: 1.84 m (6 ft 0 in)
- Position: Right-back

Team information
- Current team: SV Elversberg
- Number: 30

Youth career
- –2009: FC Stadthagen
- 2009–2010: Arminia Bielefeld
- 2010–2013: VfL Bochum

Senior career*
Years	Team	Apps	(Gls)
2013–2015	VfL Bochum II	5	(0)
2013–2019	VfL Bochum	74	(1)
2019–2022	Hamburger SV	50	(0)
2020	Hamburger SV II	1	(0)
2022–2024	1. FC Nürnberg	53	(3)
2024–2025	1. FC Kaiserslautern	23	(0)
2025–	SV Elversberg	34	(1)

International career^{‡}
2012	Germany U17	2	(0)
2012–2013	Germany U18	4	(0)
2026–	Ghana	1	(0)
- * Club domestic league appearances and goals as of 24 October 2026 ‡ National team caps and goals as of 23 May 2026

Jan Gyamerah (born 18 June 1995) is a professional footballer who plays as a right-back for Bundesliga club SV Elversberg. Born in Germany, he plays for the Ghana national team.

== Early life ==
Gyamerah was born in 1995, the son of Ghanaian Stephen Gyamerah who came to Berlin to study in 1989 and whose German wife was born in Berlin. Born on a Sunday, he received the African nickname "Kwasi" (Asante for Sunday). In 1999, the family moved to Stadthagen, Lower Saxony, where his sister, Yvonne, was born.

== Club career ==
=== VfL Bochum ===
Gyamerah first played for local club FC Stadthagen, before, via Arminia Bielefeld, moving to the youth department of VfL Bochum in January 2011. There, he progressed through the various youth teams and made his professional debut on 20 December 2013 in the 2. Bundesliga, when he came on as a substitute in the 66th minute for Danny Latza.

=== Hamburger SV ===
On 14 February 2019, Gyamerah signed a three-year contract starting from the 2019–20 season with league rivals Hamburger SV. Under head coach Dieter Hecking, Gyamerah immediately established himself in the starting lineup. On 11 September 2019, he contracted a calf fracture during practice and had to undergo surgery. During his absence, Josha Vagnoman took over the right back position, before he also fell out with a long-term injury, with Khaled Narey becoming the third player during the season to cover the position. After the winter break, newcomer Jordan Beyer, who had been loaned from first-placed Bundesliga club Borussia Mönchengladbach due to Gyamerah's and Vagnoman's injuries until the end of the season, was positioned as right back.

At the beginning of March 2020, Gyamerah returned to team practice. On the 26th matchday, which was regularly scheduled for 13 March 2020, Gyamerah was again selected for the matchday squad. However, the season was interrupted on the same day due to the COVID-19 pandemic. In early May, he suffered a muscle injury in the hip during the season break and missed the resumption of playing activities about a week later. About a month later, Gyamerah returned to the matchday squad on the 30th matchday and made his first appearance in months in the following match, when he came on as a substitute. Before the end of the season, three more league appearances followed. Gyamerah made nine 2. Bundesliga appearances during his first season at the club.

=== Nürnberg ===
On 10 June 2022, Gyamerah signed for 1. FC Nürnberg.

=== Kaiserslautern ===
On 26 July 2024, Gyamerah moved to 1. FC Kaiserslautern.

=== Elversberg ===
On 4 July 2025, Gyamerah joined SV Elversberg on a two-year contract.

== International career ==
Gyamerah was born in Germany and is of Ghanaian descent. He was a youth international for Germany.

== Career statistics ==
=== Club ===
As of match played 24 October 2026

Appearances and goals by club, season and competition
Club	Season	League			DFB-Pokal		Other		Total	
Club	Season	Division	Apps	Goals	Apps	Goals	Apps	Goals	Apps	Goals
VfL Bochum II	2012–13	Regionalliga West	3	0	—		—		3	0
VfL Bochum II	2013–14	Regionalliga West	2	0	—		—		2	0
VfL Bochum II	Total		5	0	—		—		5	0
VfL Bochum	2013–14	2. Bundesliga	2	0	0	0	—		2	0
VfL Bochum	2014–15	2. Bundesliga	0	0	0	0	—		0	0
VfL Bochum	2015–16	2. Bundesliga	0	0	0	0	—		0	0
VfL Bochum	2016–17	2. Bundesliga	23	1	1	0	—		24	1
VfL Bochum	2017–18	2. Bundesliga	24	0	1	0	—		25	0
VfL Bochum	2018–19	2. Bundesliga	25	0	0	0	—		25	0
VfL Bochum	Total		74	1	2	0	—		76	1
Hamburger SV	2019–20	2. Bundesliga	9	0	1	0	—		10	0
Hamburger SV	2020–21	2. Bundesliga	14	0	0	0	—		14	0
Hamburger SV	2021–22	2. Bundesliga	16	0	0	0	2 (Note: Appearances in Bundesliga promotion play-offs)	0	18	0
Hamburger SV	Total		39	0	1	0	2	0	42	0
Hamburger SV II	2020–21	Regionalliga West	1	0	—		—		1	0
1. FC Nürnberg	2022–23	2. Bundesliga	25	1	3	0	—		28	1
1. FC Nürnberg	2023–24	2. Bundesliga	28	2	3	0	—		31	2
1. FC Nürnberg	Total		53	3	6	0	—		59	3
1. FC Kaiserslautern	2024–25	2. Bundesliga	23	0	1	0	—		24	0
SV Elversberg	2025–26	2. Bundesliga	28	1	2	0	—		30	1
SV Elversberg	2026–27	Bundesliga	6	0	1	0	—		7	0
SV Elversberg	Total		34	1	3	0	—		37	1
Career total			228	5	13	0	2	0	243	5

=== International ===
As of match played 22 May 2026

Appearances and goals by national team and year
National team	Year	Apps	Goals
Ghana	2026	1	0
Total		1	0
