= Bakery Jatta =

Gambian footballer

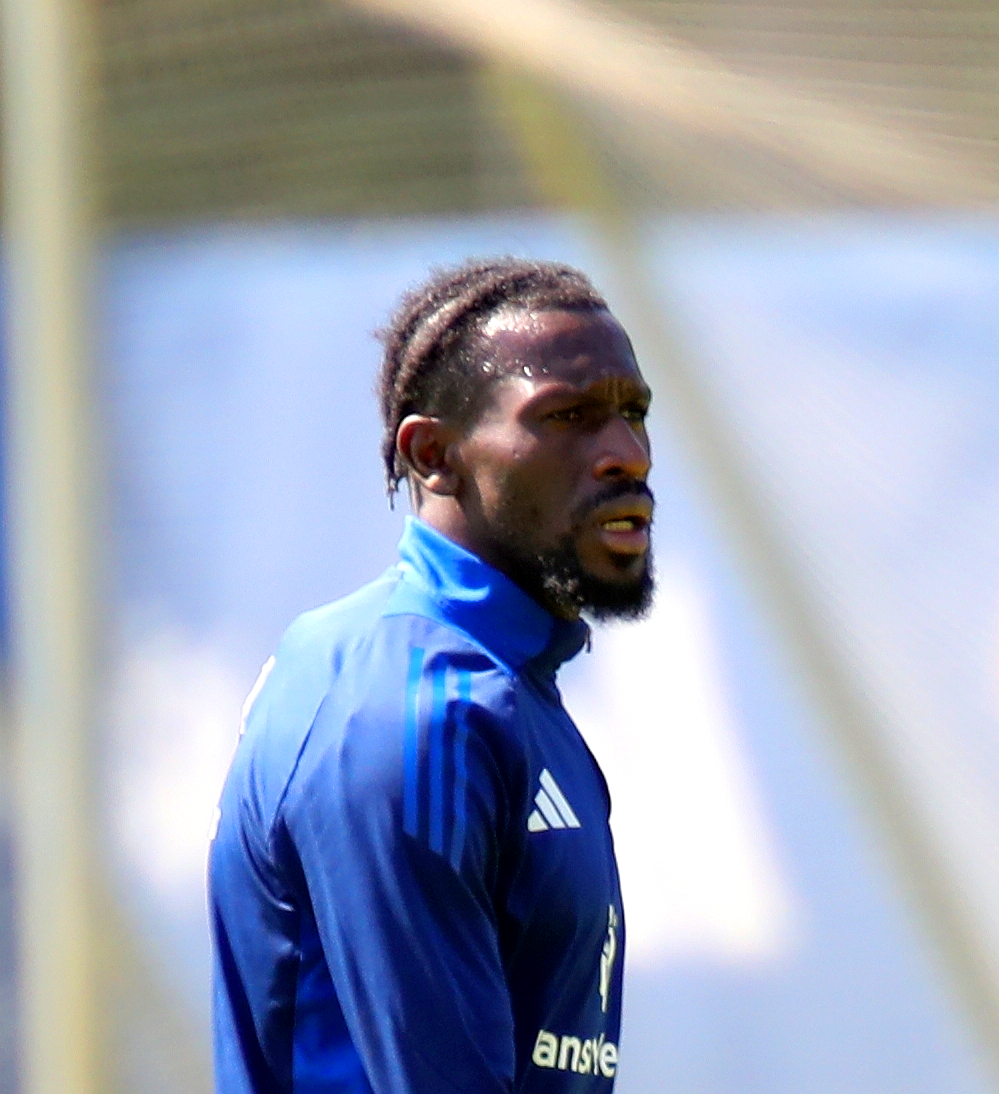
- Jatta in 2025 playing for Hamburger SV

Personal information
- Full name: Bakery Jatta
- Date of birth: 6 June 1998 (age 28)
- Place of birth: Gunjur, Gambia
- Height: 1.84 m (6 ft 0 in)
- Position: Winger

Team information
- Current team: Hamburger SV
- Number: 18

Senior career*
Years	Team	Apps	(Gls)
2016–2019	Hamburger SV II	38	(20)
2016–	Hamburger SV	213	(26)
- * Club domestic league appearances and goals as of 19 September 2026

Bakery Jatta (born 6 June 1998) is a Gambian professional footballer who plays as a winger for Bundesliga club Hamburger SV.

== Club career ==
Jatta signed for Hamburger SV in 2016, choosing HSV over rivals SV Werder Bremen. He initially played for the reserves in the Regionalliga Nord, before making his first team debut in a Bundesliga match against Bremen in April 2017, becoming the first refugee to play in the Bundesliga. He made 6 first-team appearances in his first season.

In the 2017–18 season, Hamburg were relegated to the 2. Bundesliga for the first time in their history. In their first 2. Bundesliga season, Jatta became a regular in the first team and scored his first professional goal against FC Erzgebirge Aue in November 2018, causing interest from other clubs. In January 2019, he signed a new five-year contract with Hamburg.

In January 2024 Jatta was linked with a transfer to FC Augsburg and Werder Bremen at the end of his contract in summer; however, he again signed a new five-year contract in Hamburg, expiring in 2029. Jatta is currently the second-longest serving player at HSV, behind reserve goalkeeper Tom Mickel.

== International career ==
Jatta was called up by Gambia national team in October 2019. He pulled out of the squad in November 2019, saying he wished to concentrate on his club career.

== Personal life and identity dispute ==
Jatta is said to have come to Germany in 2015 as a refugee. However, in August 2019, suspicions in the news arose over his identity as according to a German press article by Sport Bild his real name was speculated to be Bakery Daffeh and his age was speculated to be older. Initially, neither the Federal Office for Migration and Refugees nor the local Hamburg authorities were able to confirm nor deny Jatta's identity. Subsequent news stories, however, have cast doubts on the Sport Bild report. The Hamburger Abendblatt, on 29 August, reports on a visit from a Bild reporter in Gambia who as it appears may have pretended to be a representative of the German Football Association (DFB) to obtain information in Gambia. According to the same Hamburger Abendblatt report, a witness previously named by the Bild and Sport Bild strongly disagrees that Jatta and Daffeh could be the same person, thus refuting those press claims

On 30 August, German media announced that Hamburger SV has been able to obtain his birth certificate, in addition to Bakery Jatta's passport, and along with it an affidavit by a clerk of the Ministry of Foreign Affairs of The Gambia. The responsible Hamburg authority then declared on 2 September that they approved the documents Jatta presented to them and that there was no evidence for further investigation. Following this case-closing statement, defeated 1. FC Nürnberg, VFL Bochum and KSC Karlsruhe withdrew their objection against the matches that Jatta played in.

On 19 September 2019, it was reported by Bild/Sport Bild, that Jatta had stated an e-mail address containing the name Bakary Daffeh to the Bremen authorities in 2015. The Sozialzentrum Gröpelingen/Walle (local social authority) submitted a copy of a personal questionnaire filled in by Jatta to the Bremen police, with the remark that there are great inconsistencies. Questioned by public broadcaster NDR, the Bremen prosecutor confirmed an examination of this facts. A few weeks later the prosecutor announced that there would be no further proceedings; the case was to be closed from their perspective. Also in October 2019, the CEO of Axel Springer SE (Bild/Sport Bild) publishing house, Mathias Döpfner, criticised the long duration of the investigation, and that most of the media would be "systematically" ignoring the case. He mentioned the Jatta case as an example why hatred grew in parts of the population. Subsequently, the connection of the case to the Halle synagogue shooting that he made was subject to criticism.

In the first days of July 2020 Jatta's Hamburg home was searched by the police under the suspicion of violation of the German residence act, because he is suspected of having made false claims regarding his identity. According to the Hamburg prosecutor, the investigations had shown that Jatta had maintained contact with persons connected to Daffeh. His cell phone and other devices were seized.

In March 2022, the court in Hamburg-Altona dismissed the case.

== Career statistics ==
As of match played 19 September 2026

Appearances and goals by club, season and competition
Club	Season	League			DFB-Pokal		Other		Total	
Club	Season	Division	Apps	Goals	Apps	Goals	Apps	Goals	Apps	Goals
Hamburger SV II	2016–17	Regionalliga Nord	16	11	—		—		16	11
Hamburger SV II	2017–18	Regionalliga Nord	10	8	—		—		10	8
Hamburger SV II	2018–19	Regionalliga Nord	11	1	—		—		11	1
Hamburger SV II	2019–20	Regionalliga Nord	1	0	—		—		1	0
Hamburger SV II	Total		38	20	—		—		38	20
Hamburger SV	2016–17	Bundesliga	6	0	0	0	—		6	0
Hamburger SV	2017–18	Bundesliga	10	0	0	0	—		10	0
Hamburger SV	2018–19	2. Bundesliga	25	4	4	1	—		29	5
Hamburger SV	2019–20	2. Bundesliga	31	4	0	0	—		31	4
Hamburger SV	2020–21	2. Bundesliga	27	5	0	0	—		27	5
Hamburger SV	2021–22	2. Bundesliga	34	3	5	0	2 (Note: Appearances in Bundesliga relegation play-offs)	0	41	3
Hamburger SV	2022–23	2. Bundesliga	23	4	1	0	2	0	26	4
Hamburger SV	2023–24	2. Bundesliga	32	5	3	3	—		35	8
Hamburger SV	2024–25	2. Bundesliga	8	0	2	0	—		10	0
Hamburger SV	2025–26	Bundesliga	14	1	1	1	—		15	2
Hamburger SV	2026–27	Bundesliga	3	0	1	0	—		4	0
Hamburger SV	Total		213	26	17	5	4	0	234	31
Career total			251	46	17	5	4	0	273	51
