= David Kinsombi =

German footballer (born 1995)

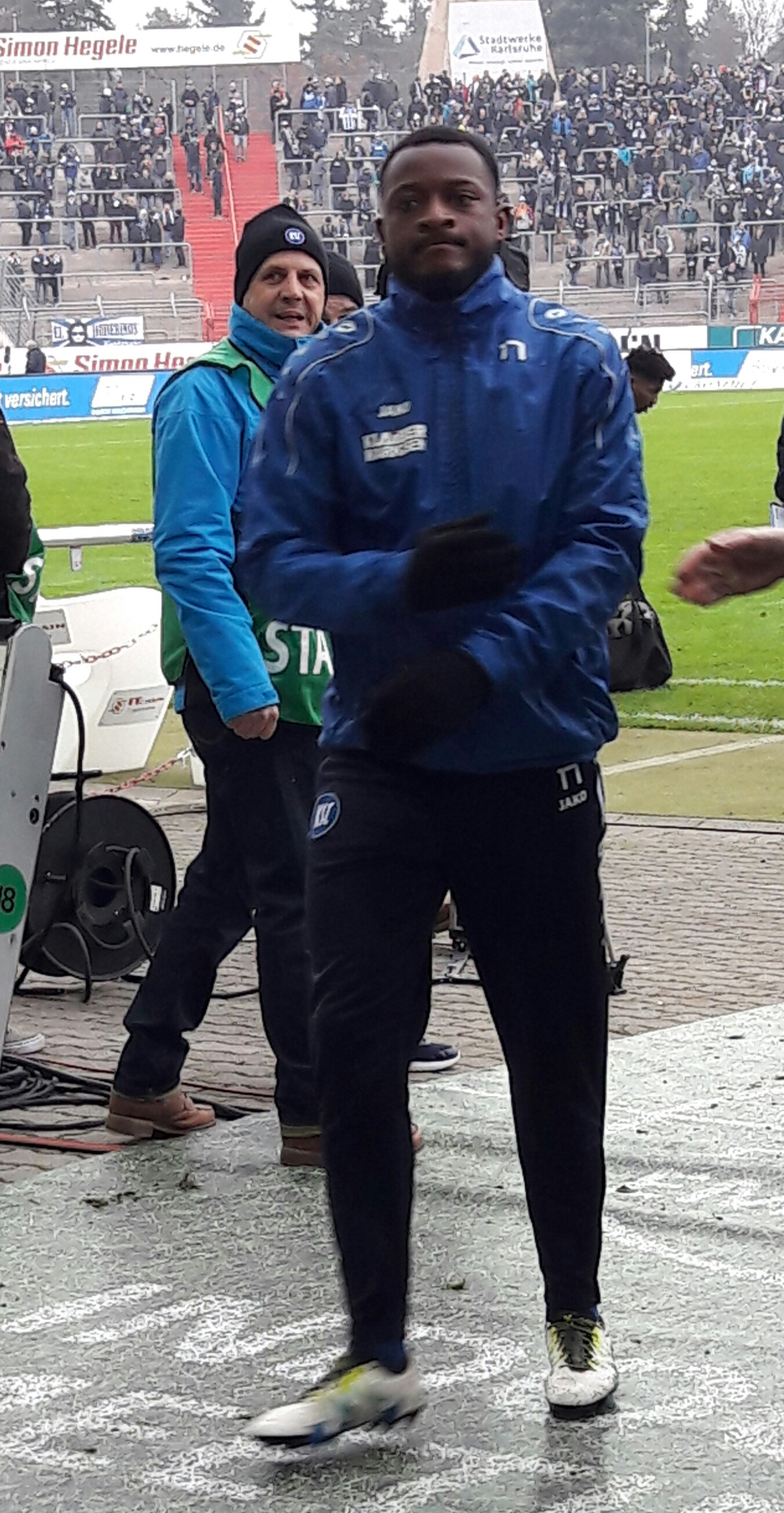
- Kinsombi in 2016

Personal information
- Date of birth: 12 December 1995 (age 30)
- Place of birth: Rüdesheim am Rhein, Germany
- Height: 1.83 m (6 ft 0 in)
- Position: Midfielder

Team information
- Current team: Würzburger Kickers
- Number: 8

Youth career
- 2002–2004: Germania Wiesbaden
- 2004–2011: SV Wehen Wiesbaden
- 2011–2014: Mainz 05

Senior career*
Years	Team	Apps	(Gls)
2013–2014	Mainz 05 II	4	(0)
2014–2016	Eintracht Frankfurt	4	(0)
2016–2017	Karlsruher SC	26	(1)
2016	→ 1. FC Magdeburg (loan)	11	(0)
2017–2019	Holstein Kiel	49	(9)
2019–2022	Hamburger SV	78	(11)
2022–2023	SV Sandhausen	27	(6)
2023–2026	SC Paderborn	43	(4)
2025	→ Preußen Münster (loan)	15	(1)
2026–	Würzburger Kickers	0	(0)

International career
2012–2013	Germany U18	3	(0)
- * Club domestic league appearances and goals as of 18 May 2026

David Kinsombi (born 12 December 1995) is a German professional footballer who plays as a midfielder for 3. Liga club Würzburger Kickers.

== Club career ==
David Kinsombi holds citizenship of Germany and the Democratic Republic of the Congo. He started his youth career with Germania Wiesbaden and SV Wehen Wiesbaden. In 2011, he joined Mainz 05. In the 2013–14 season he captained Mainz's U19 team and appeared four times with Mainz's reserve team, competing in the Regionalliga Südwest.

In March 2014, Kinsombi signed a two-year contract with Eintracht Frankfurt. On 1 November 2014, he debuted in the Bundesliga in an Eintracht away match at Hannover 96. In July 2015, it was reported Frankfurt were wanting to transfer him to another club.

He moved to Karlsruher SC on 27 January 2016. He was instantly loaned out to 1. FC Magdeburg.

On 31 May 2017, Holstein Kiel announced the signing of Kinsombi for the forthcoming 2017–18 season. Hamburger SV announced on 9 April 2019, that they had signed Kinsombi for the upcoming season.

On 13 June 2022, Kinsombi signed with SV Sandhausen, reuniting with his brother Christian.

After one season at SV Sandhausen, David moved to SC Paderborn. On 16 January 2025, he joined Preußen Münster on loan.

== Personal life ==
Kinsombi's younger brother Christian Kinsombi is also a professional footballer.

== Career statistics ==
As of match played 17 May 2026

Appearances and goals by club, season and competition
Club	Season	League			Cup		Other		Total	
Club	Season	Division	Apps	Goals	Apps	Goals	Apps	Goals	Apps	Goals
Mainz 05 II	2013–14	Regionalliga Südwest	4	0	—		—		4	0
Eintracht Frankfurt	2014–15	Bundesliga	2	0	0	0	—		2	0
Eintracht Frankfurt	2015–16	Bundesliga	2	0	0	0	—		2	0
Eintracht Frankfurt	Total		4	0	0	0	—		4	0
Karlsruher SC	2015–16	2. Bundesliga	0	0	0	0	—		0	0
Karlsruher SC	2016–17	2. Bundesliga	26	1	0	0	—		26	1
Karlsruher SC	Total		26	1	0	0	—		26	1
1. FC Magdeburg (loan)	2015–16	3. Liga	11	0	—		1 (Note: Appearance in Saxony Cup)	0	12	0
Holstein Kiel	2017–18	2. Bundesliga	31	5	2	0	2 (Note: Appearances in promotion play-offs)	0	35	5
Holstein Kiel	2018–19	2. Bundesliga	18	4	2	1	—		20	5
Holstein Kiel	Total		49	9	4	1	2	0	55	10
Hamburger SV	2019–20	2. Bundesliga	27	5	2	0	—		29	5
Hamburger SV	2020–21	2. Bundesliga	26	4	0	0	—		26	4
Hamburger SV	2021–22	2. Bundesliga	25	2	4	0	0	0	29	2
Hamburger SV	Total		78	11	6	0	0	0	84	11
SV Sandhausen	2022–23	2. Bundesliga	27	6	3	0	—		30	6
Paderborn 07	2023–24	2. Bundesliga	30	3	3	0	—		33	3
Paderborn 07	2024–25	2. Bundesliga	10	1	2	0	—		12	1
Paderborn 07	2025–26	2. Bundesliga	3	0	0	0	0	0	3	0
Paderborn 07	Total		43	4	5	0	0	0	48	4
Preußen Münster (loan)	2024–25	2. Bundesliga	15	1	—		—		15	1
Career total			226	27	16	1	1	0	243	28
