= Ogechika Heil =

German footballer (born 2000)

Personal information
- Full name: Ogechika Brian Heil
- Date of birth: 27 November 2000 (age 25)
- Place of birth: Kassel, Germany
- Height: 1.78 m (5 ft 10 in)
- Position: Midfielder

Team information
- Current team: ETSV Hamburg
- Number: 19

Youth career
- Fortuna Kassel
- –2015: KSV Baunatal
- 2015–2016: Hessen Kassel
- 2016–2019: Hamburger SV

Senior career*
Years	Team	Apps	(Gls)
2019–2020	Hamburger SV II	24	(4)
2021–2023	Hamburger SV	7	(0)
2021–2022	→ Go Ahead Eagles (loan)	28	(1)
2023–2024	Preußen Münster	1	(0)
2024	Preußen Münster II	1	(2)
2024–2025	Greifswalder FC	21	(1)
2025-	ETSV Hamburg	22	(4)
- * Club domestic league appearances and goals as of 12 March 2026

Ogechika Brian Heil (born 27 November 2000) is a German professional footballer who plays as a midfielder for Oberliga Hamburg club ETSV Hamburg.

== Career ==
Heil played for the youth teams of Fortuna Kassel, KSV Baunatal and Hessen Kassel, before joining the academy of Hamburger SV in 2016. In 2019, he was promoted to Hamburg's second team. He made his professional debut for Hamburg's first team on 3 January 2021, coming on as a substitute in the 90th minute for Bakery Jatta against Jahn Regensburg. The home match finished as a 3–1 win for Hamburger SV.

On 31 August 2023, Heil signed with Preußen Münster.

On 16 August 2024, Heil's contract with Preußen Münster was terminated and he signed with Greifswalder FC in Regionalliga.

== Personal life ==
Heil is a native of Kassel, Hesse, and was born to a German mother and a Nigerian father.
