= Amadou Onana =

Belgian footballer (born 2001)

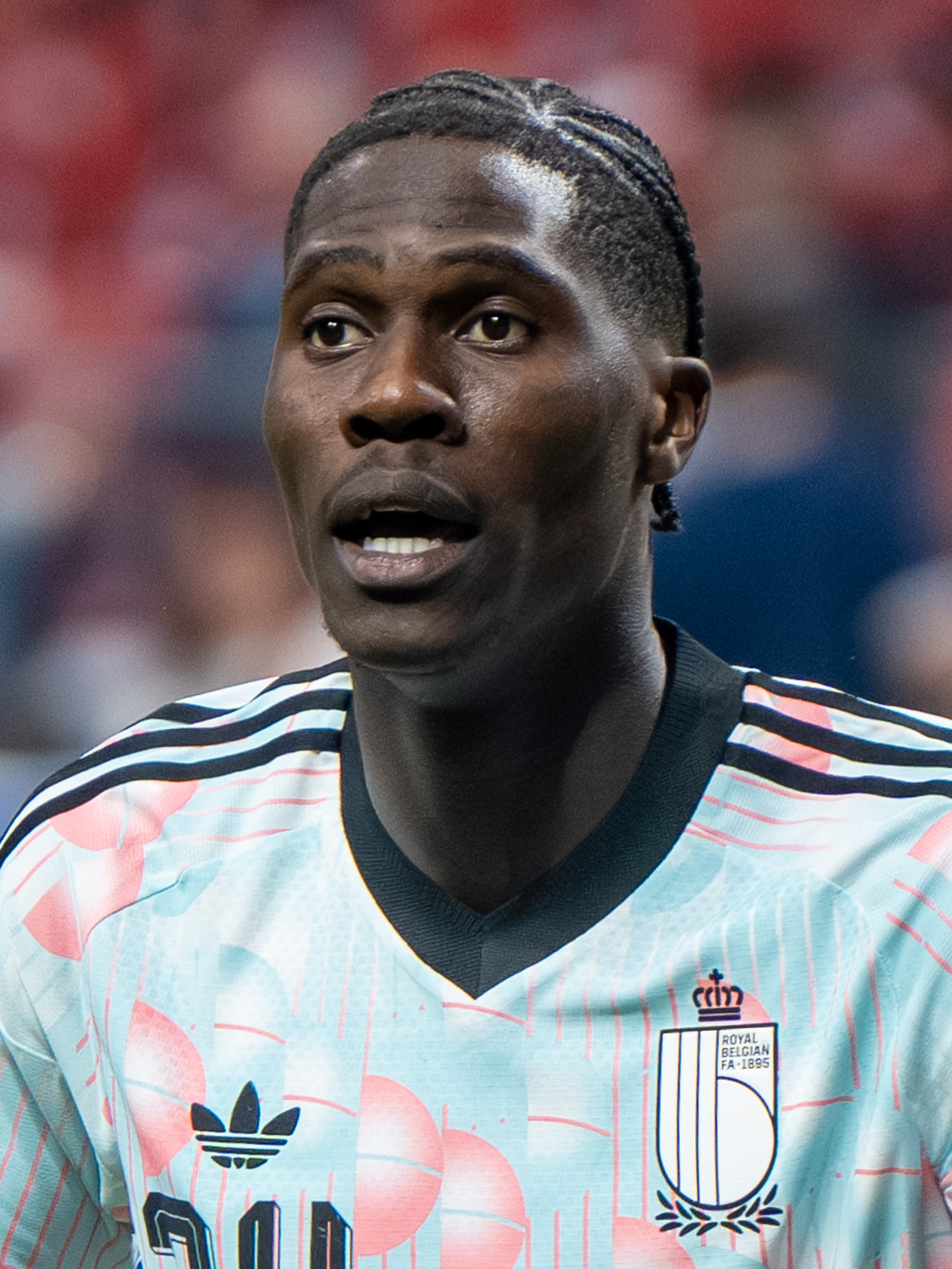
- Onana with Belgium in 2026

Personal information
- Full name: Amadou Ba Zeund Georges Mvom Onana
- Date of birth: 16 August 2001 (age 25)
- Place of birth: Dakar, Senegal
- Height: 1.95 m (6 ft 5 in)
- Position: Defensive midfielder

Team information
- Current team: Aston Villa
- Number: 24

Youth career
- Anderlecht
- RWS Bruxelles
- –2017: Zulte Waregem
- 2017–2020: TSG Hoffenheim

Senior career*
Years	Team	Apps	(Gls)
2019–2020	TSG Hoffenheim II	1	(0)
2020–2021	Hamburger SV	25	(2)
2021–2022	Lille	32	(1)
2022–2024	Everton	63	(3)
2024–	Aston Villa	51	(5)

International career^{‡}
2018	Belgium U17	12	(0)
2018–2019	Belgium U18	8	(0)
2019	Belgium U19	6	(0)
2021–2022	Belgium U21	7	(1)
2022–	Belgium	33	(1)
- * Club domestic league appearances and goals as of 18:35, 24 May 2026 (UTC) ‡ National team caps and goals as of 08:35, 7 July 2026 (UTC)

Amadou Ba Zeund Georges Mvom Onana (born 16 August 2001) is a professional footballer who plays as a defensive midfielder for Premier League club Aston Villa. Born in Senegal, he represents the Belgium national team.

== Club career ==
=== Hamburger SV ===
Onana joined 2. Bundesliga club Hamburger SV in mid-2020. He made his professional debut for the club in the first round of the 2020–21 DFB-Pokal on 14 September 2020, coming on as a substitute in the 60th minute against 3. Liga side Dynamo Dresden. He scored a header in the 89th minute of the match, which finished as a 4–1 away loss.

=== Lille ===
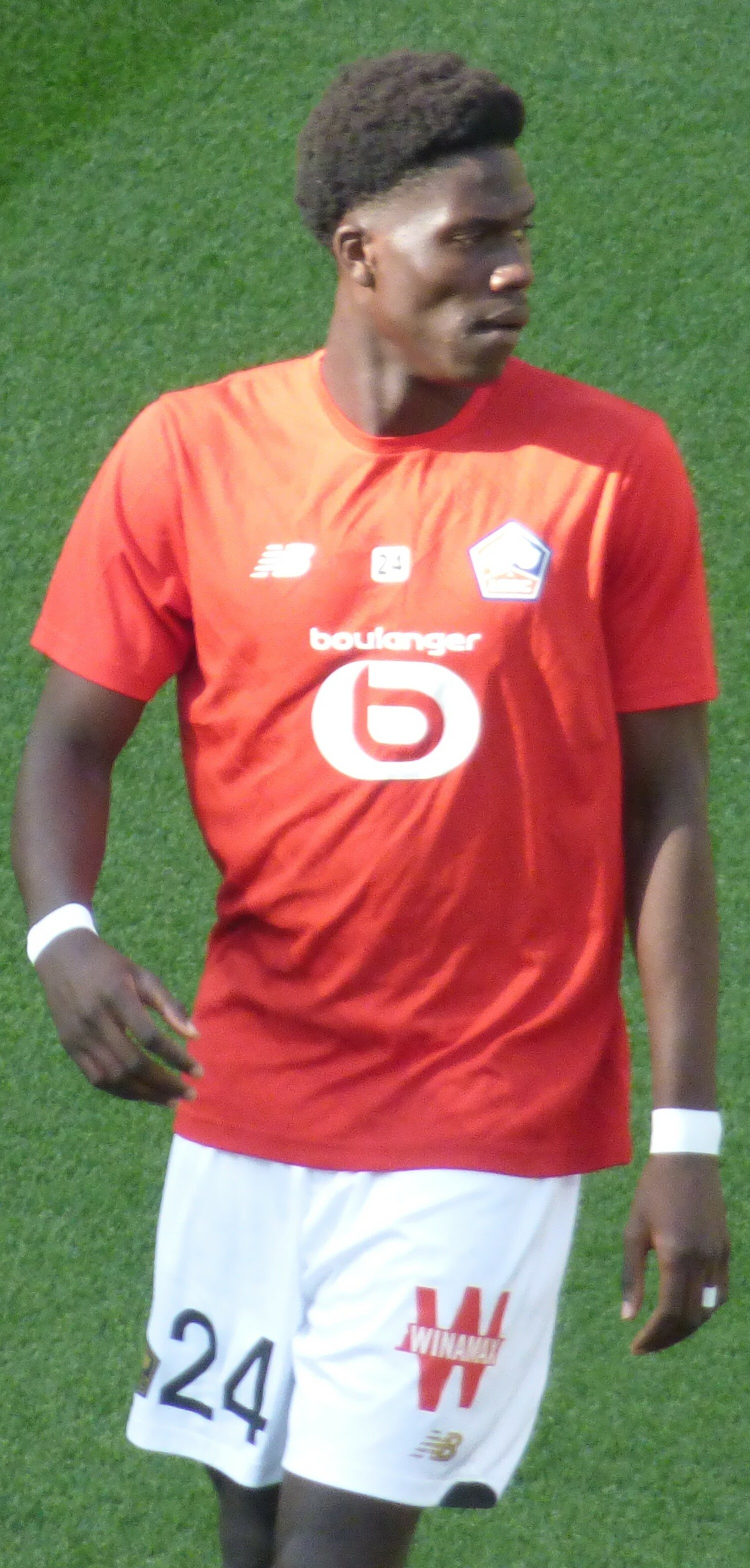
Onana playing for Lille in 2021.

In August 2021, Onana joined French champions Lille on a five-year deal. He made 32 appearances in 2021–22 Ligue 1, scoring once, as well as appearing in all eight of the team's UEFA Champions League matches.

=== Everton ===
Onana signed for Premier League club Everton on a five-year contract on 9 August 2022 for a reported £33m including add-ons. He scored his first Premier League goal for Everton, a header from a corner, in a 2–1 home defeat against Southampton on 14 January 2023.

On 19 December 2023, Onana missed what would have been the winning penalty for Everton in their 2023–24 EFL Cup quarter-final against Fulham. With the penalties standing at 4–3 in Everton's favour, Onana attempted a penalty with no run up. Onana proceeded to pass the ball along the ground past Fulham goalkeeper Bernd Leno who easily saved the attempt. Fulham would go on to win 7–6 in the penalty shootout.

=== Aston Villa ===
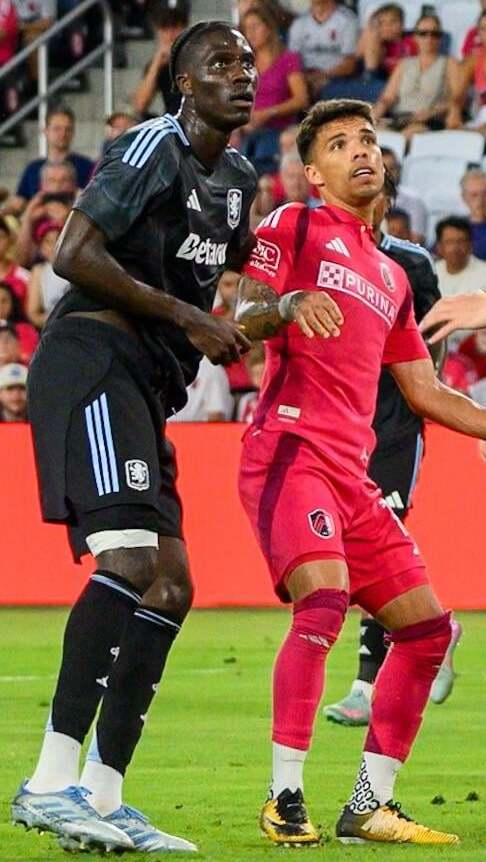
Onana playing for Aston Villa in 2025.

On 22 July 2024, Onana joined fellow Premier League club Aston Villa, signing a five-year contract in a transfer reported to be worth £50 million. On 17 August 2024, he scored on his Aston Villa debut in a 2–1 opening day victory against West Ham United. Two weeks later, Onana scored the opening goal of Villa's 2–1 victory against Leicester City. On 17 September, Onana scored Aston Villa's third goal in their 3–0 victory against BSC Young Boys on his UEFA Champions League debut for the club.

On 18 November 2026, despite expecting to be sidelined for most, if not all, of the 2025–26 season due to a knee injury suffered at the previous summer's World Cup, Onana signed a new contract with Aston Villa. It was reported to extend until the summer of 2031.

== International career ==
Onana playing for Belgium at the 2026 FIFA World Cup

On 18 May 2022, Onana was named in the Belgium senior squad for the four 2022–23 UEFA Nations League matches in June 2022 against Netherlands, Poland (twice) and Wales respectively. 20-year-old Onana made his full international debut against the Netherlands on 3 June 2022.

On 10 November 2022, Onana was named in the final 26-man squad for the 2022 FIFA World Cup in Qatar. He made two appearances at the tournament, appearing as a substitute in the first group game against Canada and starting against Morocco in the second. He was suspended for Belgium's final match, as the team drew 0–0 with Croatia and were eliminated.

On 28 May 2024, Onana was selected in the 26-man squad for UEFA Euro 2024. He played every minute of Belgium's four matches at the tournament, where they were knocked out by neighbours France in the round of 16.

On 28 March 2026, Onana scored his first international goal in a 5–2 friendly victory over the United States at the Mercedes-Benz Stadium. He was selected in Belgium's squad for the 2026 FIFA World Cup. He sustained an ACL injury during the Round of 16 match against hosts the United States.

== Personal life ==
Onana was born in Dakar, Senegal, to a Senegalese mother and a Cameroonian father. In 2012, Onana moved to Brussels, Belgium, with his mother and sister to join his father.

Onana is a Muslim. He is fluent in five languages: Wolof, French, Dutch, German and English. Outside of football, he also makes rap music under the name 24 am, having released his debut single "Check On Me" on 2 August 2024.

== Career statistics ==
=== Club ===
As of match played 24 May 2026

Appearances and goals by club, season and competition
Club	Season	League			National cup (Note: Includes DFB-Pokal, Coupe de France, FA Cup)		League cup (Note: Includes EFL Cup)		Europe		Other		Total	
Club	Season	Division	Apps	Goals	Apps	Goals	Apps	Goals	Apps	Goals	Apps	Goals	Apps	Goals
TSG Hoffenheim II	2018–19	Regionalliga Südwest	1	0	—		—		—		—		1	0
Hamburger SV	2020–21	2. Bundesliga	25	2	1	1	—		—		—		26	3
Lille	2021–22	Ligue 1	32	1	2	2	—		9 (Note: Appearances in UEFA Champions League)	0	—		43	3
Everton	2022–23	Premier League	33	1	1	0	1	0	—		—		35	1
Everton	2023–24	Premier League	30	2	3	0	4	1	—		—		37	3
Everton	Total		63	3	4	0	5	1	—		—		72	4
Aston Villa	2024–25	Premier League	26	3	2	1	1	0	5	1	—		34	5
Aston Villa	2025–26	Premier League	25	2	1	0	0	0	12 (Note: Appearances in UEFA Europa League)	0	—		38	2
Aston Villa	2026–27	Premier League	0	0	0	0	0	0	0	0	0	0	0	0
Aston Villa	Total		51	5	3	1	1	0	17	1	0	0	72	7
Career total			172	11	10	4	6	1	26	1	0	0	214	17

=== International ===
As of match played 6 July 2026

Appearances and goals by national team and year
National team	Year	Apps	Goals
Belgium	2022	4	0
Belgium	2023	5	0
Belgium	2024	11	0
Belgium	2025	5	0
Belgium	2026	8	1
Total		33	1

Belgium score listed first, score column indicates score after each Onana goal.

List of international goals scored by Amadou Onana
No.	Date	Venue	Opponent	Score	Result	Competition
1	28 March 2026	Mercedes-Benz Stadium, Atlanta, United States	United States	2–1	5–2	Friendly

== Honours ==
Aston Villa

- UEFA Europa League: 2025–26

Individual

- Aston Villa Player of the Month: August 2024
