= Stephan Ambrosius =

Ghanaian footballer (born 1998)

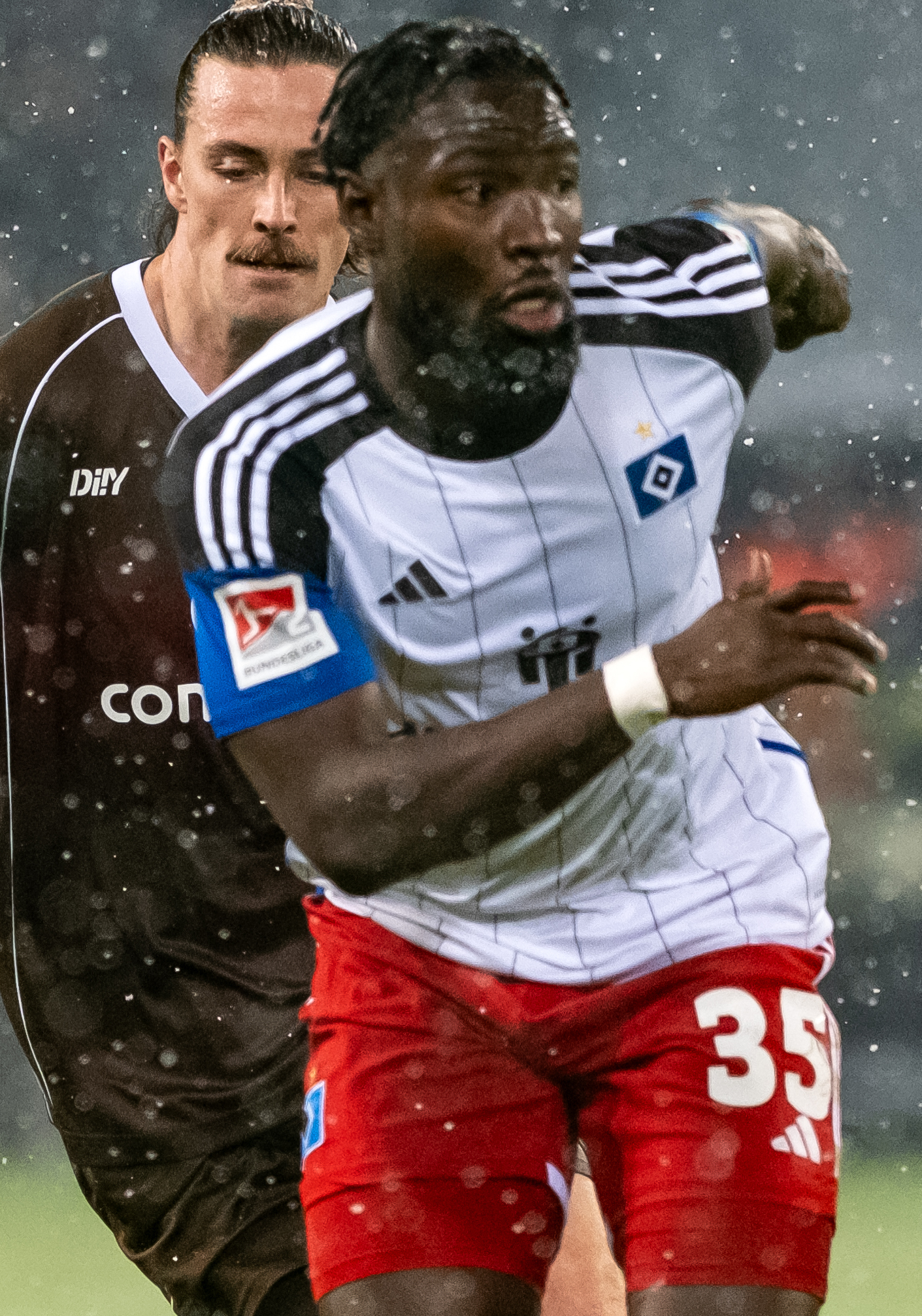
- Ambrosius (front) playing for Hamburger SV in 2023

Personal information
- Full name: Stephan Kofi Ambrosius
- Date of birth: 18 December 1998 (age 27)
- Place of birth: Hamburg, Germany
- Height: 1.82 m (6 ft 0 in)
- Position: Centre-back

Team information
- Current team: St. Gallen
- Number: 5

Youth career
- 2003–200?: Einigkeit Wilhelmsburg
- SV Wilhelmsburg
- –2012: FC St. Pauli
- 2012–2017: Hamburger SV

Senior career*
Years	Team	Apps	(Gls)
2017–2020	Hamburger SV II	52	(1)
2018–2024	Hamburger SV	46	(0)
2022–2023	→ Karlsruher SC (loan)	18	(0)
2024–	St. Gallen	26	(0)
2026	→ Karlsruher SC (loan)	12	(0)

International career^{‡}
2020	Germany U21	1	(0)
2023–	Ghana	4	(0)
- * Club domestic league appearances and goals as of 18 May 2026 ‡ National team caps and goals as of 23 May 2026 (UTC)

Stephan Kofi Ambrosius (born 18 December 1998) is a professional footballer who plays as a centre-back for Swiss Super League club St. Gallen. Born in Germany, and a former German youth international, he represents the Ghana national team.

Ambrosius joined the Hamburger SV youth academy in 2012, rising through the ranks and making his professional debut in the Bundesliga in March 2018.

== Early years ==
Stephan Ambrosius was born in Hamburg to Ghanaian parents. He grew up in the quarter of Wilhelmsburg.

== Club career ==
=== Hamburger SV ===
==== Youth ====
Ambrosius started playing football at the age of 5 at local club Einichkeit Wilhelmsburg, before moving to SV Wilhelmsburg and finally FC St. Pauli. In 2012, at the age of 13, Pauli moved to the Hamburger SV youth academy. At HSV, he progressed through all the youth teams until 2017 and played, among other things, in the Under 17 and Under 19 Bundesliga. For the 2017–18 season, Ambrosius was promoted to the second team, Hamburger SV II, and competed in the fourth-tier Regionalliga.

==== 2017–19 ====
In early February 2018, Ambrosius was promoted to the professional squad by head coach Bernd Hollerbach. On 10 February 2018, he was called up for the first team squad for his first Bundesliga game, but did not make an appearance in the 0–2 defeat away at Borussia Dortmund. He made his Bundesliga debut on 31 March 2018 in a 1–1 away draw against VfB Stuttgart under new head coach Christian Titz, who had taken over the reigns in early March. Ambrosius debuted in the starting lineup and was substituted at half-time for Rick van Drongelen. This proved to be his only appearance during the season, which saw HSV suffer relegation to the 2. Bundesliga for the first time in club history. For the second team, Ambrosius made 20 appearances and scored one goal.

Ahead of the 2018–19 season, Ambrosius signed his first professional contract running until 30 June 2021. In the first half of the new season, he was behind Rick van Drongelen, David Bates and Léo Lacroix in the depth chart, and neither under Titz nor under his successor Hannes Wolf he made an appearance in the 2. Bundesliga, instead only playing in the DFB-Pokal besides his 15 appearances for the second team in the Regionalliga Nord. In December 2018, Ambrosius suffered an anterior cruciate ligament injury, sidelining him for the rest of the season.

==== 2019–present ====
In the 2019–20 pre-season, Ambrose was demoted to the second team by the new head coach Dieter Hecking. There, he immediately established himself as a starter again. In February 2020, Ambrosius returned to first-team practice as Gideon Jung was utilised in defensive midfield following the injury of Adrian Fein and only Ewerton was available alongside central defenders Rick van Drongelen and Timo Letschert. After Jung received a red card on 29 February against Erzgebirge Aue and Ewerton suffered a long-term injury, Ambrosius was included in the first-team squad for the matchup against SSV Jahn Regensburg on 7 March for the first time that season. On the last matchday of the season, he made his first and only league appearance that season in the 5–1 home defeat to SV Sandhausen and received a "satisfactory" score by sports magazine kicker, the best score of a field player on a desolate HSV team. Due to the COVID-19 pandemic, Ambrosius made only 17 appearances (15 appearances as a starter) in the Regionalliga, before the season was cancelled.

At the beginning of the 2020–21 season, Ambrosius became a regular starter under new head coach Daniel Thioune and formed a duo at centre-back alongside new addition Toni Leistner. In January 2021, 22-year-old Ambrosius extended his contract, which would have expired at the end of the season, until 2024. After Leistner suffered a long-term injury in early 2021, Thioune stated: "The only one set is Stephan [Ambrosius]. This brings stability to our defensive chain. Everyone is welcome to orient themselves to him." In April 2021, Ambrosius tore his cruciate ligament in his right knee for the second time in three years.

From January 2022, Ambrosius gradually returned to first-team training after having been sidelined for an extended period; a competitive return was expected in March. In March 2022, however, he could only train individually due to a muscle injury. In April 2022, Ambrosius returned to the matchday squad for the first time in a year. Despite his return to fitness, Ambrosius failed to make a single appearance during the 2021–22 season, which saw Hamburger SV miss out on promotion in the promotion playoffs against Hertha BSC.

=== Karlsruhe ===
On 16 August 2022, Ambrosius joined Karlsruher SC on a season-long loan.

=== St. Gallen ===
On 21 June 2024, Ambrosius joined Swiss Super League side St. Gallen on a free transfer, signing a three-year deal.

==== Return to Karlsruhe ====
On 16 January 2026, he returned to Karlsruher SC on loan with an option to buy.

== International career ==
Born in Hamburg, Ambrosius was also eligible to play for Ghana due to his parents being from the country. Due to numerous cancellations in his playing position by Nico Schlotterbeck and Maxim Leitsch, Ambrosius was called up by Germany under-21 coach Stefan Kuntz in early October 2020. However, as Ambrosius tested positive for SARS-CoV-2, he was unable to participate in the 2021 UEFA European Under-21 Championship qualification matches against Moldova and Bosnia and Herzegovina. Ambrosius finally made his debut for the under-21 side in November 2020.

In July 2022, the president of the Ghana FA, Kurt Okraku, announced that Ambrosius was one of the few players that had officially switched allegiances to represent the Ghanaian senior national team internationally.

== Career statistics ==
As of match played 25 April 2021

Appearances and goals by club, season and competition
Club	Season	League			DFB-Pokal		Europe		Other		Total	
Club	Season	Division	Apps	Goals	Apps	Goals	Apps	Goals	Apps	Goals	Apps	Goals
Hamburger SV	2017–18	Bundesliga	1	0	0	0	—		—		1	0
Hamburger SV	2018–19	2. Bundesliga	0	0	1	0	—		—		1	0
Hamburger SV	2019–20	2. Bundesliga	1	0	0	0	—		—		1	0
Hamburger SV	2020–21	2. Bundesliga	26	0	0	0	—		—		26	0
Hamburger SV	2021–22	2. Bundesliga	0	0	0	0	—		0	0	0	0
Hamburger SV	Total		28	0	1	0	—		0	0	29	0
Hamburger SV II	2017–18	Regionalliga	20	1	—		—		—		20	1
Hamburger SV II	2018–19	Regionalliga	15	0	—		—		—		15	0
Hamburger SV II	2019–20	Regionalliga	17	0	—		—		—		17	0
Hamburger SV II	Total		52	1	—		—		—		52	1
Career total			80	1	1	0	—		0	0	81	1
