= Jonas David =

German footballer

Personal information
- Full name: Jonas Benjamin Chimezie David
- Date of birth: 8 March 2000 (age 26)
- Place of birth: Hamburg, Germany
- Height: 1.90 m (6 ft 3 in)
- Position: Centre-back

Team information
- Current team: SSV Ulm
- Number: 15

Youth career
- –2013: Meiendorfer SV
- 2013–2014: Eintracht Norderstedt
- 2014–2018: Hamburger SV

Senior career*
Years	Team	Apps	(Gls)
2018–2020	Hamburger SV II	29	(1)
2018–2024	Hamburger SV	53	(1)
2020	→ Würzburger Kickers (loan)	5	(0)
2023–2024	→ Hansa Rostock (loan)	15	(0)
2024–2025	WSG Tirol	17	(2)
2025–	SSV Ulm	9	(0)

International career
2018–2019	Germany U19	5	(0)
2019	Germany U20	4	(0)
- * Club domestic league appearances and goals as of 30 May 2026

Jonas Benjamin Chimezie David (born 8 March 2000) is a German professional footballer who plays as a centre-back for club SSV Ulm.

== Club career ==
=== Early career ===
David, who has Nigerian roots, began playing football in the youth department of Meiendorfer SV, before moving to the youth system of Eintracht Norderstedt in 2013. There, he stood out in matches against youth teams of Hamburger SV and moved to the HSV youth department ahead of the 2014–15 season.

=== Hamburger SV ===
==== 2018–19 season ====
For the 2018–19 season, David was promoted to the first team, reuniting him with head coach Christian Titz, under whom he had already played for the HSV U17 team in the Under 17 Bundesliga. He made his professional debut in a 0–3 home loss to Holstein Kiel in the 2. Bundesliga when he came on for David Bates in central defense during the second half. In September 2018, David signed his first professional contract, a three-year deal. As part of the first team, he failed to make his breakthrough under Titz and his successor Hannes Wolf. In addition to two appearances as a substitute in the 2. Bundesliga, David made 19 appearances, in which he scored one goal, for the second team in the fourth-tier Regionalliga Nord. At the beginning of the season, he also played once for the U19-team, for whom he was only eligible to appear for one more season, in the Under 19 Bundesliga.

==== Loan to Würzburger Kickers ====
Until the winter break of the 2019–20 season, David was the fifth central defender on the depth chart under new head coach Dieter Hecking, behind Rick van Drongelen, Timo Letschert, Ewerton and Gideon Jung. In addition to one appearance as a substitute in the 2. Bundesliga, he made 8 appearances in the Regionalliga for HSV II. In late January 2020, David moved to 3. Liga club Würzburger Kickers on a six-month loan. Under head coach Michael Schiele, he was utilised in 5 of 6 possible games before the season was suspended due to the COVID-19 pandemic. In four of the matches he appeared instead of the injured Daniel Hägele in central defense alongside team captain Sebastian Schuppan. After the season was resumed after almost two and a half months, David missed the last 9 games due to a muscle injury. Without him, Würzburger Kickers climbed from 10th to 2nd place and won promotion to the 2. Bundesliga.

==== 2020–21 season ====
For the 2020–21 season, David returned to Hamburger SV, who had once again missed promotion to the Bundesliga, ending in 4th place during his absence. Before the season, he signed a four-year contract extension, keeping him at the club until 30 June 2024.

==== Loan to Hansa Rostock ====
On 29 August 2023, David joined Hansa Rostock on a season-long loan.

==== Release by Hamburger SV ====
David's contract with Hamburger SV was terminated by mutual consent on 1 September 2024.

=== WG Tirol ===
After leaving Hamburger SV, he joins WSG Tirol as a free agent.

=== SSV Ulm ===
On 14 August 2025, David returned to Germany and signed a two-season contract with SSV Ulm in 3. Liga.

== International career ==
David was previously active for the Germany under-19 and under-20 national teams. He's also eligible for Nigeria national football team.

== Honours ==
Würzburger Kickers

- 3. Liga runners-up: 2019–20
