= Tim Leibold =

German footballer (born 1993)

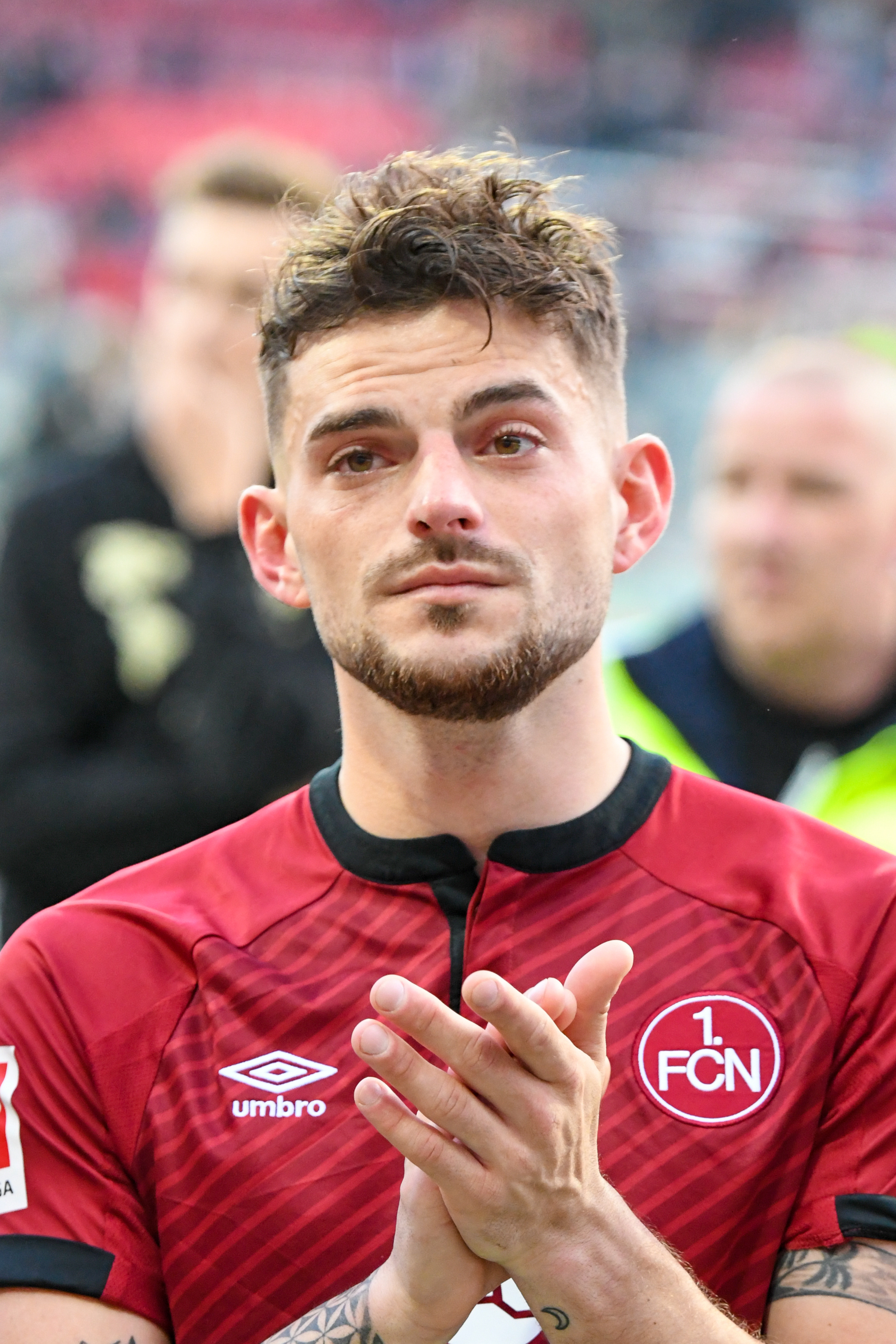
- Leibold with 1. FC Nürnberg in 2019

Personal information
- Full name: Tim Leibold
- Date of birth: 30 November 1993 (age 32)
- Place of birth: Böblingen, Germany
- Height: 1.74 m (5 ft 9 in)
- Position: Left-back

Team information
- Current team: Sacramento Republic FC
- Number: 21

Youth career
- 2000–2006: VfB Stuttgart
- 2006–2009: TSF Ditzingen
- 2009–2011: SGV Freiberg

Senior career*
Years	Team	Apps	(Gls)
2012–2013	SGV Freiberg	33	(5)
2013–2015	VfB Stuttgart II	54	(1)
2015–2019	1. FC Nürnberg	102	(8)
2019–2022	Hamburger SV	78	(5)
2023–2025	Sporting Kansas City	64	(2)
2026–	Sacramento Republic FC	6	(0)

International career^{‡}
2013	Germany U20	5	(0)
- * Club domestic league appearances and goals as of 2 September 2026 ‡ National team caps and goals as of 6 December 2013

Tim Leibold (born 30 November 1993) is a German professional footballer who plays left-back for USL Championship team Sacramento Republic FC. He began his career with VfB Stuttgart before joining 1. FC Nürnberg in 2015, where he experienced his breakthrough.

== Club career ==
=== Early years ===
Leibold played for VfB Stuttgart until he was 12 years old. During his youth career, he played for TSF Ditzingen and SGV Freiberg where he also played for the adult team in the Oberliga Baden-Württemberg. In the 2012–13 season he played 33 matches and scored 5 goals. One year later he changed teams again and went back to VfB Stuttgart II, where he played for the second team in the 3.Liga.

On 20 July 2013, Leibold played his first match for VfB Stuttgart II as a professional in 2013–14 season against Borussia Dortmund II.

=== 1. FC Nürnberg ===
For the 2015–16 season Leibold moved to 1. FC Nürnberg in the 2.Bundesliga. On 6 May 2018 he scored as Nurnberg won 2–0 against SV Sandhausen to clinch promotion to the Bundesliga.

=== Hamburger SV ===
For the 2019–20 season Leibold moved to Hamburger SV, where he signed a four-year contract. Under head coach Dieter Hecking, Leibold was an undisputed starter and did not miss a single minute of the playing time during the season. In addition to scoring one goal, he made the most assists of the season with 16 assists. In particular, he convinced with good performances in the first half of the season, after which he was rated by the German sports magazine kicker behind Moritz Heyer of VfL Osnabrück as the second best defender in the league. In the second half of the season, Leibold's performance and that of the entire team, which had been on pace for a direct promotion place after the first half of the season, decreased. At the end of the season, HSV missed promotion to the Bundesliga in 4th place for a second season in a row. Leibold made it into the kicker team of the season. The player himself took on responsibility with the words "We screwed it up ourselves, that's why we don't complain that we didn't get promoted" and named several late draws and defeats as a reason for the failure. According to Leibold, the team was "simply too immature in the end," the "knockouts" meant that by the end of the season "their heads were empty, their legs too heavy".

For the 2020–21 season, Leibold was appointed team captain by the new head coach Daniel Thioune, thereby succeeding Aaron Hunt.

He would be relegated to vice-captain by Tim Walter after Sebastian Schonlau would be appointed team captain right after leaving SC Paderborn 07.

=== Sporting Kansas City ===
On 12 January 2023, it was announced Leibold had signed with MLS side Sporting Kansas City on a three-year deal. Leibold made his debut on 28 February 2023 in a match against Portland Timbers where he was substituted on for the last 17 minutes of the match. Sporting KC lost the match 1–0. Leibold made his first start on 12 March 2023 in a goalless draw at home to LA Galaxy. Following the 2025 season, Kansas City opted to release him from the club.

=== Sacramento Republic FC ===
On July 31, 2026, it was announced that Leipold signed a 25-day contract with USL Championship side Sacramento Republic FC. He subsequently signed with Sacramento for the remainder of the 2026 season.

== International career ==
On 10 October 2013, Leibold celebrated his first match for the Germany U20 national team at the Tournament of 4 nations versus Turkey. During this tournament, he played four more matches while Germany won the tournament.
