= 2023–24 Hamburger SV season =

Hamburger SV
2023–24 season
- President: Marcell Jansen
- Head coach: Tim Walter (until 12 February); Merlin Polzin (caretaker, from 12 to 20 February); Steffen Baumgart (from 20 February)
- Stadium: Volksparkstadion
- 2. Bundesliga: 4th
- DFB-Pokal: Round of 16
- Top goalscorer: League: Robert Glatzel (19); All: Robert Glatzel (20)
- Highest home attendance: 57,000
- Lowest home attendance: 51,776 vs Karlsruher SC
- Average home league attendance: 55,908
- Biggest win: Hamburger SV 3–0 Hertha BSC
- Biggest defeat: Holstein Kiel 4–2 Hamburger SV; Fortuna Düsseldorf 2–0 Hamburger SV
| Home colours | Away colours | Third colours |

The 2023–24 season was Hamburger SV's 137th season in existence, and sixth consecutive season in the 2. Bundesliga. They also competed in the DFB-Pokal, where they were eliminated in the round of 16.

== Players ==
=== First-team squad ===
As of 31 January 2024

Note: Flags indicate national team as defined under FIFA eligibility rules; some limited exceptions apply. Players may hold more than one non-FIFA nationality.

| No. | Pos. | Nation | Player |
|---|---|---|---|
| 1 | GK | POR | Daniel Heuer Fernandes |
| 2 | DF | FRA | William Mikelbrencis |
| 3 | DF | GER | Moritz Heyer |
| 4 | DF | GER | Sebastian Schonlau (captain) |
| 5 | DF | BIH | Dennis Hadžikadunić (on loan from Rostov) |
| 6 | MF | POL | Łukasz Poręba (on loan from Lens) |
| 8 | MF | SVK | László Bénes |
| 9 | FW | GER | Robert Glatzel |
| 10 | MF | SUR | Immanuel Pherai |
| 11 | FW | GHA | Ransford-Yeboah Königsdörffer |
| 12 | GK | GER | Tom Mickel |
| 13 | DF | POR | Guilherme Ramos |
| 14 | MF | NED | Ludovit Reis |
| 17 | MF | JPN | Masaya Okugawa (on loan from Augsburg) |
| 18 | MF | GAM | Bakery Jatta |
| 19 | GK | GER | Matheo Raab |

| No. | Pos. | Nation | Player |
|---|---|---|---|
| 20 | FW | HUN | András Németh |
| 21 | MF | GER | Levin Öztunalı |
| 22 | DF | BEL | Ignace Van Der Brempt (on loan from Red Bull Salzburg) |
| 23 | MF | GER | Jonas Meffert |
| 27 | FW | FRA | Jean-Luc Dompé |
| 28 | DF | SUI | Miro Muheim |
| 33 | DF | GER | Noah Katterbach |
| 35 | DF | GHA | Stephan Ambrosius |
| 36 | MF | FIN | Anssi Suhonen |
| 41 | MF | EGY | Omar Megeed |
| 43 | DF | GER | Bent Andresen |
| 44 | DF | CRO | Mario Vušković |
| 45 | FW | GER | Tom Sanne |
| 46 | MF | GER | Elijah Krahn |
| 47 | DF | GER | Nicolas Oliveira |

=== Out on loan ===
Note: Flags indicate national team as defined under FIFA eligibility rules; some limited exceptions apply. Players may hold more than one non-FIFA nationality.

| No. | Pos. | Nation | Player |
|---|---|---|---|
| — | GK | SWE | Marko Johansson (at Hansa Rostock until 30 June 2024) |
| — | GK | GER | Leo Oppermann (at Arminia Bielefeld until 30 June 2024) |
| — | DF | GER | Jonas David (at Hansa Rostock until 30 June 2024) |

| No. | Pos. | Nation | Player |
|---|---|---|---|
| — | DF | KOS | Valon Zumberi (at FC Schaffhausen until 30 June 2024) |
| — | FW | BFA | Daouda Beleme (at VfB Lübeck until 30 June 2024) |

== Transfers ==
=== In ===
| Pos. | Player | Transferred from | Fee | Date | Source |
|---|---|---|---|---|---|
| DF | (Germany) Maximilian Rohr | (Germany) SC Paderborn 07 | Loan return | 30 June 2023 | |
| GK | (Sweden) Marko Johansson | (Germany) VfL Bochum | Loan return | 30 June 2023 | |
| DF | (Ghana) Stephan Ambrosius | (Germany) Karlsruher SC | Loan return | 30 June 2023 | |
| FW | (Germany) Robin Meißner | (Germany) Viktoria Köln | Loan return | 30 June 2023 | |
| MF | (Germany) Levin Öztunalı | (Germany) Union Berlin | Free | 1 July 2023 | |
| DF | (Portugal) Guilherme Ramos | (Germany) Arminia Bielefeld | Free | 1 July 2023 | |
| MF | (Netherlands) Immanuel Pherai | (Germany) Eintracht Braunschweig | €750,000 | 1 July 2023 | |
| DF | (Bosnia and Herzegovina) Dennis Hadžikadunić | (Russia) Rostov | Loan | 6 July 2023 | |
| DF | (Belgium) Ignace Van Der Brempt | (Austria) Red Bull Salzburg | Loan | 18 July 2023 | |
| MF | (Poland) Łukasz Poręba | (France) Lens | Loan | 30 August 2023 | |
| GK | (Sweden) Marko Johansson | (Sweden) Halmstads BK | Loan return | 31 December 2023 | |
| MF | (Japan) Masaya Okugawa | (Germany) FC Augsburg | Loan | 14 January 2024 | |
| DF | (Germany) Noah Katterbach | (Germany) 1. FC Köln | Free | 31 January 2024 | |

=== Out ===
| Pos. | Player | Transferred to | Fee | Date | Source |
|---|---|---|---|---|---|
| MF | (England) Xavier Amaechi | (Germany) 1. FC Magdeburg | Free | 1 July 2023 | |
| DF | (Germany) Maximilian Rohr | (Germany) SC Paderborn 07 | €500,000 | 1 July 2023 | |
| GK | (Germany) Leo Oppermann | (Germany) Arminia Bielefeld | Loan | 1 July 2023 | |
| FW | (Burkina Faso) Daouda Beleme | (Germany) FC Ingolstadt | Loan | 2 July 2023 | |
| FW | (Germany) Robin Meißner | (Germany) Dynamo Dresden | Free | 4 July 2023 | |
| MF | (Germany) Filip Bilbija | (Germany) SC Paderborn | €500,000 | 7 July 2023 | |
| FW | (Germany) Sonny Kittel | (Poland) Raków Częstochowa | Free | 20 July 2023 | |
| GK | (Sweden) Marko Johansson | (Sweden) Halmstads BK | Loan | 2 August 2023 | |
| DF | (Kosovo) Valon Zumberi | (Switzerland) Schaffhausen | Loan | 15 January 2024 | |
| GK | (Sweden) Marko Johansson | (Germany) Hansa Rostock | Loan | 30 January 2024 | |
| FW | (Burkina Faso) Daouda Beleme | (Germany) VfB Lübeck | Loan | 1 February 2024 | |

== Pre-season and friendlies ==
Win Draw Loss Fixtures

| 7 July 2023 Friendly | Viktoria Plzeň | 3–3 | Hamburger SV | Westendorf, Austria |
| 18:00 UTC+2 | Durosinmi 44' (pen.); Řezník 53'; Vydra 83' | Report | Glatzel 31' (pen.); Öztunalı 34'; Königsdörffer 56'; Jatta (yellow card) 73' | Stadium: Waldstadion Westendorf; Attendance: 1,100; Referee: David Astl (Austria) |

| 15 July 2023 Friendly | Red Bull Salzburg | 4–1 | Hamburger SV | Anif, Austria |
| 10:30 UTC+2 | Konaté 9'; Hadžikadunić 13' (o.g.); Amankwah 23'; Nene 55' | Report | Pherai 30'; Krahn (yellow card) 77'; Zumberi (yellow card) 90' | Stadium: Sportzentrum Anif; Attendance: 1,000; Referee: Sebastian Gishamer (Austria) |

| 22 July 2023 Friendly | Rangers | 2–1 | Hamburger SV | Glasgow, Scotland |
| 14:00 UTC+1 | Sakala 38'; Tavernier 45' (pen.) | | Dompé 90' | Stadium: Ibrox Stadium; Attendance: 46,542; Referee: Kevin Clancy (Scotland) |

| 7 January 2024 Friendly | PSV | 2–2 | Hamburger SV | Marbella, Spain |
| 16:30 CET (UTC+1) | De Jong 18', 43'; Ramalho (red card) 31'; Til (yellow card) 73' | | Ramos 7'; Glatzel 35' (pen.); Hadžikadunić (yellow card) 73' | Stadium: Marbella Football Center |

| 11 January 2024 Friendly | Zürich | 2–2 | Hamburger SV | La Línea de la Concepción, Spain |
| 13:30 CET (UTC+1) | Okita 31'; Reichmuth 86' | | Meffert 16'; Glatzel 73' | Stadium: Estadio Municipal de La Línea de la Concepción |

| 20 March 2024 Friendly | Hamburger SV | 2–1 | Viborg FF | Hamburg |
| CET (UTC+1) | Poręba 48'; Jatta 82' (pen.) | Report | Grønning 40' (pen.) | Stadium: Volksparkstadion; Referee: Luca Jürgensen |

== Competitions ==
=== Overall record ===
| Competition | First match | Last match | Starting round | Final position | Record | | | | | | | |
| Competition | First match | Last match | Starting round | Final position | Pld | W | D | L | GF | GA | GD | Win % |
|---|---|---|---|---|---|---|---|---|---|---|---|---|
| 2. Bundesliga | 28 July 2023 | 19 May 2024 | Matchday 1 | 4th | 34 | 17 | 7 | 10 | 64 | 44 | +20 | 50.00 |
| DFB-Pokal | 13 August 2023 | 6 December 2023 | First round | Round of 16 | 3 | 1 | 2 | 0 | 8 | 7 | +1 | 33.33 |
| Total | | | | | 37 | 18 | 9 | 10 | 72 | 51 | +21 | 48.65 |

Source: Soccerway

=== 2. Bundesliga ===
==== League table ====
| Pos | Team | Pld | W | D | L | GF | GA | GD | Pts | Qualification or relegation |
|---|---|---|---|---|---|---|---|---|---|---|
| 2 | Holstein Kiel (P) | 34 | 21 | 5 | 8 | 65 | 39 | +26 | 68 | Promotion to Bundesliga |
| 3 | Fortuna Düsseldorf | 34 | 18 | 9 | 7 | 72 | 40 | +32 | 63 | Qualification for promotion play-offs |
| 4 | Hamburger SV | 34 | 17 | 7 | 10 | 64 | 44 | +20 | 58 | |
| 5 | Karlsruher SC | 34 | 15 | 10 | 9 | 68 | 48 | +20 | 55 | |
| 6 | Hannover 96 | 34 | 13 | 13 | 8 | 59 | 44 | +15 | 52 | |

Source: DFB
Rules for classification: 1) Points; 2) Goal difference; 3) Goals scored; 4) Head-to-head results; 5) Head-to-head away goals scored; 6) Away goals scored; 7) Play-off.
(Rules 4–6 only apply after home and away matches have been played between the tied teams.)
(P) Promoted

==== Results summary ====
| Overall | | | | | | | | Home | | | | | | Away | | | | | |
| Pld | W | D | L | GF | GA | GD | Pts | W | D | L | GF | GA | GD | W | D | L | GF | GA | GD |
|---|---|---|---|---|---|---|---|---|---|---|---|---|---|---|---|---|---|---|---|
| 34 | 17 | 7 | 10 | 64 | 44 | +20 | 58 | 12 | 0 | 5 | 36 | 19 | +17 | 5 | 7 | 5 | 28 | 25 | +3 |

Source: DFB

==== Results by round ====
| Round | 1 | 2 | 3 | 4 | 5 | 6 | 7 | 8 | 9 | 10 | 11 | 12 | 13 | 14 | 15 | 16 | 17 | 18 | 19 | 20 | 21 | 22 | 23 | 24 | 25 | 26 | 27 | 28 | 29 | 30 | 31 | 32 | 33 | 34 |
|---|---|---|---|---|---|---|---|---|---|---|---|---|---|---|---|---|---|---|---|---|---|---|---|---|---|---|---|---|---|---|---|---|---|---|
| Ground | H | A | H | A | H | A | A | H | A | H | A | H | A | H | A | H | A | A | H | A | H | A | H | H | A | H | A | H | A | H | A | H | A | H |
| Result | W | D | W | W | W | L | L | W | D | W | D | W | L | W | D | L | W | W | L | W | L | D | W | L | L | W | D | W | D | L | W | W | L | W |
| Position | 2 | 3 | 1 | 1 | 1 | 2 | 3 | 2 | 2 | 2 | 3 | 2 | 2 | 2 | 3 | 3 | 3 | 3 | 4 | 2 | 3 | 3 | 3 | 3 | 3 | 3 | 4 | 4 | 4 | 4 | 4 | 4 | 4 | 4 |

Source: DFB
A = Away; H = Home; W = Win; D = Draw; L = Loss

==== Matches ====
The league fixtures were unveiled on 30 June 2023.

| 28 July 2023 1 | Hamburger SV | 5–3 | Schalke 04 | Hamburg |
| 20:30 UTC+2 | Öztunalı (yellow card) 12'; Glatzel 16', 90+1', (yellow card) 90+2'; Heyer (yellow card) 19'; Bénes 56' (pen.), 60'; Dompé 90+9' | Report | Ouédraogo 22'; Ouwejan 45+1'; Schallenberg (yellow card) 63'; Terodde 66'; Cissé (yellow card) 55' (yellow-red card) 71' | Stadium: Volksparkstadion; Attendance: 57,000; Referee: Matthias Jöllenbeck |

| 6 August 2023 2 | Karlsruher SC | 2–2 | Hamburger SV | Karlsruhe |
| 13:30 UTC+2 | Schleusener 13'; Nebel (yellow card) 49'; Gondorf (yellow card) 59'; Heise (yellow card) 73'; Zivzivadze 90+5' | Report | Ramos (yellow card) 6'; Hadžikadunić (yellow card) 42'; Bénes 61'; Glatzel 65' | Stadium: Wildparkstadion; Attendance: 33,000; Referee: Felix Brych |

| 19 August 2023 3 | Hamburger SV | 3–0 | Hertha BSC | Hamburg |
| 20:30 UTC+2 | Jatta 38'; Bénes 45+4' (pen.), (yellow card) 49'; Meffert (yellow card) 46'; Glatzel 82' | Report | Dudziak (yellow card) 16'; Winkler (yellow card) 64' | Stadium: Volksparkstadion; Attendance: 57,000; Referee: Frank Willenborg |

| 26 August 2023 4 | Hannover 96 | 0–1 | Hamburger SV | Hannover |
| 20:30 UTC+2 | Leopold (yellow card) 43' | Report | Muheim (yellow card) 13'; Meffert (yellow card) 26'; Ramos (red card) 53'; Jatta 69', (yellow card) 83'; Hadžikadunić (yellow card) 74' | Stadium: Heinz von Heiden-Arena; Attendance: 49,000; Referee: Tobias Reichel |

| 3 September 2023 5 | Hamburger SV | 2–0 | Hansa Rostock | Hamburg |
| 13:30 UTC+2 | Reis 45+6'; Bénes 48'; Jatta (yellow card) 57'; Van Der Brempt (yellow card) 80' | Report | Pröger (yellow card) 19'; Ingelsson (yellow card) 32'; Schumacher (yellow card) 40'; Neidhart (yellow card) 83'; Kinsombi (yellow card) 84' | Stadium: Volksparkstadion; Attendance: 55,000; Referee: Benjamin Brand |

| 16 September 2023 6 | SV Elversberg | 2–1 | Hamburger SV | Spiesen-Elversberg |
| 13:00 UTC+2 | Rochelt 9'; Sickinger (yellow card) 39'; Schnellbacher 60'; Vandermersch (yellow card) 70'; Jacobsen (yellow card) 90+3' | Report | Hadžikadunić (yellow card) 34'; Meffert (yellow card) 77'; Heyer 89' | Stadium: Waldstadion an der Kaiserlinde; Attendance: 10,150; Referee: Patrick Schwengers |

| 22 September 2023 7 | VfL Osnabrück | 2–1 | Hamburger SV | Osnabrück |
| 18:30 UTC+2 | Engelhardt 16'; Tesche (yellow card) 22'; Diakhité 39'; Gyamfi (yellow card) 44'; Cuisance (yellow card) 57'; Conteh (yellow card) 60'; Gnaase (yellow card) 75' | Report | Bénes (yellow card) 4'; Glatzel 12'; Heyer (yellow card) 41'; Mikelbrencis (yellow card) 51'; Jatta (yellow card) 59'; Königsdörffer (yellow card) 75'; Fernandes (yellow card) 90+3' | Stadium: Stadion an der Bremer Brücke; Attendance: 15,741; Referee: Florian Exner |

| 29 September 2023 8 | Hamburger SV | 1–0 | Fortuna Düsseldorf | Hamburg |
| 18:30 UTC+2 | Hadžikadunić (yellow card) 41'; Van Der Brempt (yellow card) 54'; Bénes 83' (pen.); Dompé (yellow card) 90+6' | Report | Jóhannesson (yellow card) 47'; Engelhardt (yellow card) 56'; Zimmermann (yellow card) 74' (yellow-red card) 76'; Iyoha (yellow card) 82'; Siebert (yellow card) 90+6' | Stadium: Volksparkstadion; Attendance: 56,100; Referee: Felix Zwayer |

| 7 October 2023 9 | Wehen Wiesbaden | 1–1 | Hamburger SV | Wiesbaden |
| 13:00 UTC+2 | Fechner (yellow card) 57'; Vukotić 81'; Petković (yellow card) 87'; Stritzel (yellow card) 90+4'; Kauczinski (yellow card) 90+8' | Report | Muheim (yellow card) 41', (goal) 89'; Reis (yellow card) 82' | Stadium: Brita-Arena; Attendance: 12,100; Referee: Wolfgang Haslberger |

| 21 October 2023 10 | Hamburger SV | 2–0 | Greuther Fürth | Hamburg |
| 13:00 UTC+2 | Meffert 16'; Heyer (yellow card) 26'; Jatta (yellow card) 38'; Glatzel 45+4' | Report | Itter (yellow card) 32'; Lemperle (yellow card) 45+3'; Michalski (yellow card) 45+10'; Abiama (yellow card) 58' | Stadium: Volksparkstadion; Attendance: 55,800; Referee: Robert Schröder |

| 28 October 2023 11 | 1. FC Kaiserslautern | 3–3 | Hamburger SV | Kaiserslautern |
| 20:30 UTC+2 | Tomiak 13'; Ritter 24'; Boyd (yellow card) 49', (goal) 54' | Report | Glatzel 10', 65'; Heyer (yellow card) 35'; Pherai (yellow card) 53'; Muheim 73', (yellow card) 79'; Ramos (yellow card) 87'; Walter (yellow card) 90' | Stadium: Fritz-Walter-Stadion; Attendance: 49,327; Referee: Florian Badstübner |

| 4 November 2023 12 | Hamburger SV | 2–0 | 1. FC Magdeburg | Hamburg |
| 20:30 UTC+1 | Bénes 9'; Jatta 72'; Ambrosius (yellow card) 87' | Report | Atik (yellow card) 43'; Elfadli (red card) 78'; Bockhorn (yellow card) 83' | Stadium: Volksparkstadion; Attendance: 56,800; Referee: Robert Exner |

| 11 November 2023 13 | Holstein Kiel | 4–2 | Hamburger SV | Kiel |
| 13:00 UTC+1 | Skrzybski 20' (pen.); Pichler 57', (yellow card) 68'; Sander (yellow card) 81'; Porath 83'; Sterner 88' | Report | Hadžikadunić (yellow card) 31'; Meffert (yellow card) 44'; Glatzel 71', 80' | Stadium: Holstein-Stadion; Attendance: 15,034; Referee: Deniz Aytekin |

| 24 November 2023 14 | Hamburger SV | 2–1 | Eintracht Braunschweig | Hamburg |
| 18:30 UTC+1 | Ramos 25'; Pherai 26'; Jatta (yellow card) 90' | Report | Kaufmann (yellow card) 55', (goal) 62'; Gómez (yellow card) 77' | Stadium: Volksparkstadion; Attendance: 57,000; Referee: Max Burda |

| 3 December 2023 15 | FC St. Pauli | 2–2 | Hamburger SV | Hamburg |
| 18:30 UTC+1 | Irvine 15'; Fernandes 27' (o.g.); Wahl (yellow card) 64' | Report | Ramos (yellow card) 29'; Meffert (yellow card) 44'; Glatzel 58'; Pherai 60'; Mikelbrencis (yellow card) 90+6' | Stadium: Millerntor-Stadion; Attendance: 29,153; Referee: Felix Zwayer |

| 9 December 2023 16 | Hamburger SV | 1–2 | SC Paderborn | Hamburg |
| 13:00 UTC+1 | Bénes 11', (yellow card) 86'; Muheim (red card) 78'; Heyer (yellow card) 90+5' | Report | Bilbija 21', (red card) 69'; Ansah 62'; Boevink (yellow card) 85' | Stadium: Volksparkstadion; Attendance: 52,244; Referee: Christian Dingert |

| 16 December 2023 17 | 1. FC Nürnberg | 0–2 | Hamburger SV | Nuremberg |
| 13:00 UTC+1 | Brown (yellow card) 45+2' | Report | Meffert (yellow card) 42'; Jatta (yellow card) 44'; Mikelbrencis (yellow card) 64'; Glatzel 80'; Bénes (yellow card) 90+6'; Dompé 90+7', (yellow card) 90+8' | Stadium: Max-Morlock-Stadion; Attendance: 41,276; Referee: Tobias Reichel |

| 20 January 2024 18 | Schalke 04 | 0–2 | Hamburger SV | Gelsenkirchen |
| 20:30 UTC+1 | Brunner (yellow card) 33'; Kamiński (yellow card) 44'; Schallenberg (yellow card) 60' | Report | Pherai 22'; Bénes 35'; Meffert (yellow card) 64'; Heyer (yellow card) 67' | Stadium: Veltins-Arena; Attendance: 61,992; Referee: Sven Jablonski |

| 28 January 2024 19 | Hamburger SV | 3–4 | Karlsruher SC | Hamburg |
| 13:30 UTC+1 | Jatta 33'; Bénes 35'; Glatzel 62'; Ramos (yellow card) 65' | Report | Matanović 3', 6'; Jensen (yellow card) 39'; Zivzivadze 46'; Wanitzek 81'; Rapp (yellow card) 87' | Stadium: Volksparkstadion; Attendance: 51,776; Referee: Robert Schröder |

| 3 February 2024 20 | Hertha BSC | 1–2 | Hamburger SV | Berlin |
| 20:30 UTC+1 | Kempf (yellow card) 40'; Tabaković 82'; Bouchalakis (yellow card) 89'; Leistner (yellow card) 90+2'; Niederlechner (yellow card) 90+11'; Scherhant (yellow card) 90+24' | Report | Pherai (yellow card) 45+2'; Muheim 77', (yellow card) 83'; Reis 90+13' | Stadium: Olympiastadion; Attendance: 58,013; Referee: Daniel Schlager |

| 9 February 2024 21 | Hamburger SV | 3–4 | Hannover 96 | Hamburg |
| 18:30 UTC+1 | Bénes 24', (yellow card) 87', (red card) 88'; Hadžikadunić 47', (yellow card) 78' (yellow-red card) 90+16'; Glatzel 86' | Report | Tresoldi 11'; Ramos 21' (o.g.); Schaub 32'; Nielsen (yellow card) 90+2'; Ernst 90+8'; Teuchert (yellow card) 90+18' | Stadium: Volksparkstadion; Attendance: 57,000; Referee: Sören Storks |

| 17 February 2024 22 | Hansa Rostock | 2–2 | Hamburger SV | Rostock |
| 13:00 UTC+1 | Perea 50'; Roßbach (yellow card) 55'; Guðjohnsen 82'; Ingelsson (yellow card) 86'; Kolke (yellow card) 87'; Lang (yellow card) 90+2' | Report | Ambrosius (yellow card) 28'; Dompé 34'; Ramos (yellow card) 43'; Glatzel 86' | Stadium: Ostseestadion; Attendance: 27,500; Referee: Felix Zwayer |

| 25 February 2024 23 | Hamburger SV | 1–0 | SV Elversberg | Hamburg |
| 13:30 UTC+1 | Reis (yellow card) 36'; Königsdörffer 53'; Katterbach (yellow card) 81' | Report | Vandermersch (yellow card) 46' | Stadium: Volksparkstadion; Attendance: 54,190; Referee: Harm Osmers |

| 3 March 2024 24 | Hamburger SV | 1–2 | VfL Osnabrück | Hamburg |
| 13:30 UTC+1 | Reis (yellow card) 26'; Glatzel 45+2' (pen.); Pherai (yellow card) 47'; Dompé (yellow card) 65'; Poręba (yellow card) 80' | Report | Kunze 6'; Gyamfi (yellow card) 45' (yellow-red card) 76'; Kleinhansl (yellow card) 63'; Cuisance (yellow card) 82', (goal) 89' (pen.) | Stadium: Volksparkstadion; Attendance: 57,000; Referee: Richard Hempel |

| 8 March 2024 25 | Fortuna Düsseldorf | 2–0 | Hamburger SV | Düsseldorf |
| 18:30 UTC+1 | Klaus 11'; Siebert (yellow card) 56'; Tzolis 63'; Jóhannesson (yellow card) 74' | Report | Heyer (yellow card) 27' (yellow-red card) 51' | Stadium: Merkur Spiel-Arena; Attendance: 52,000; Referee: Martin Petersen |

| 17 March 2024 26 | Hamburger SV | 3–0 | Wehen Wiesbaden | Hamburg |
| 13:30 UTC+1 | Muheim 32'; Bénes 51'; Pherai (yellow card) 67'; Königsdörffer 85' | Report | Mathisen (yellow card) 49' | Stadium: Volksparkstadion; Attendance: 55,523; Referee: Bastian Dankert |

| 31 March 2024 27 | Greuther Fürth | 1–1 | Hamburger SV | Fürth |
| 13:30 UTC+2 | Sieb (yellow card) 36'; Haddadi (yellow card) 74'; Consbruch 77' | Report | Hadžikadunić (yellow card) 23'; Muheim (yellow card) 49', (goal) 56'; Meffert (yellow card) 90+2' | Stadium: Sportpark Ronhof Thomas Sommer; Attendance: 16,126; Referee: Tobias Welz |

| 6 April 2024 28 | Hamburger SV | 2–1 | 1. FC Kaiserslautern | Hamburg |
| 13:00 UTC+2 | Bénes 34'; Poręba 60'; Königsdörffer (yellow card) 73' | Report | Ache 45+1'; Touré (yellow card) 57' | Stadium: Volksparkstadion; Attendance: 57,000; Referee: Deniz Aytekin |

| 14 April 2024 29 | 1. FC Magdeburg | 2–2 | Hamburger SV | Magdeburg |
| 13:30 UTC+2 | El Hankouri 26' (pen.), 45+7' (pen.); Schuler (yellow card) 45+1'; Condé (yellow card) 72' | Report | Ramos (red card) 24'; Schonlau 68'; Meffert 90+4' | Stadium: MDCC-Arena; Attendance: 27,090; Referee: Robert Kampka |

| 20 April 2024 30 | Hamburger SV | 0–1 | Holstein Kiel | Hamburg |
| 20:30 UTC+2 | Meffert (yellow card) 67' | Report | Rothe 59'; Holtby (yellow card) 72' (yellow-red card) 73' | Stadium: Volksparkstadion; Attendance: 57,000; Referee: Sascha Stegemann |

| 27 April 2024 31 | Eintracht Braunschweig | 0–4 | Hamburger SV | Braunschweig |
| 13:00 UTC+2 | | Report | Glatzel 9', 22'; Königsdörffer (yellow card) 33'; Jatta 69'; Reis 84' | Stadium: Eintracht-Stadion; Attendance: 22,167; Referee: Daniel Siebert |

| 3 May 2024 32 | Hamburger SV | 1–0 | FC St. Pauli | Hamburg |
| 18:30 UTC+2 | Muheim (yellow card) 39'; Meffert (yellow card) 66'; Glatzel 85'; Reis (penalty missed) 90+7' | Report | Metcalfe (yellow card) 45+4'; Saliakas (yellow card) 79' (yellow-red card) 90+7' | Stadium: Volksparkstadion; Attendance: 57,000; Referee: Matthias Jöllenbeck |

| 10 May 2024 33 | SC Paderborn | 1–0 | Hamburger SV | Paderborn |
| 18:30 UTC+2 | Kostons 7' | Report | | Stadium: Home Deluxe Arena; Attendance: 15,000; Referee: Frank Willenborg |

| 19 May 2024 34 | Hamburger SV | 4–1 | 1. FC Nürnberg | Hamburg |
| 15:30 UTC+2 | Glatzel 6', 28', 90+5' (pen.); Poręba 22' | Report | Schleimer 16' | Stadium: Volksparkstadion; Attendance: 57,000; Referee: Arne Aarnink |

=== DFB-Pokal ===
| 13 August 2023 First round | Rot-Weiss Essen | 3–4 (a.e.t.) | Hamburger SV | Essen |
| 13:00 UTC+2 | Müsel 42'; Doumbouya 56'; Brumme 83' | Report | Jatta 37', 54'; Krahn (yellow card) 40'; Glatzel 66'; Van Der Brempt (yellow card) 72'; Ramos (yellow card) 98'; Ambrosius (yellow card) 106'; Bénes 117'; Königsdörffer (yellow card) 120+2' | Stadium: Stadion an der Hafenstraße; Attendance: 18,600; Referee: Felix Zwayer |

| 31 October 2023 Second round | Arminia Bielefeld | 1–1 (a.e.t.) (3–4 p) | Hamburger SV | Bielefeld |
| 20:45 UTC+1 | Özkan (yellow card) 8'; Kniat (yellow card) 10'; Shipnoski 11', (yellow card) 120+3'; Oppie (yellow card) 34'; Boujellab (yellow card) 97'; Gohlke (yellow card) 99' | Report | Muheim (yellow card) 20'; Jatta 77'; Ramos (yellow card) 87'; Hadžikadunić (yellow card) 90+6'; Glatzel (yellow card) 99'; Königsdörffer (yellow card) 105+2' | Stadium: Schüco-Arena; Attendance: 26,500; Referee: Robert Kampka |
| | Penalties |
| | Klos (penalty missed); Gohlke (penalty scored); Mizuta (penalty scored); Großer (penalty scored); Marius Wörl (penalty missed) | | (penalty scored) Bénes; (penalty scored) Muheim; (penalty scored) Glatzel; (penalty missed) Krahn; (penalty scored) Heyer |

| 6 December 2023 Round of 16 | Hertha BSC | 3–3 (a.e.t.) (5–3 p) | Hamburger SV | Berlin |
| 20:45 UTC+1 | Reese 21', 90'; Karbownik (yellow card) 26'; Scherhant (yellow card) 45+2'; Niederlechner (yellow card) 60'; Kenny (yellow card) 107', (goal) 120' | Report | Pherai (yellow card) 24', (goal) 31'; Jatta (yellow card) 40'; Bénes 43'; Meffert (yellow card) 90+1'; Glatzel (yellow card) 90+7'; Königsdörffer 102' | Stadium: Olympiastadion; Attendance: 58,946; Referee: Sascha Stegemann |
| | Penalties |
| | Prevljak (penalty scored); Klemens (penalty scored); El-Jindaoui (penalty scored); Kenny (penalty scored); Reese (penalty scored) | | (penalty scored) Bénes; (penalty scored) Muheim; (penalty scored) Glatzel; (penalty missed) Königsdörffer |
