= Daniel Heuer Fernandes =

Portuguese footballer (born 1992)

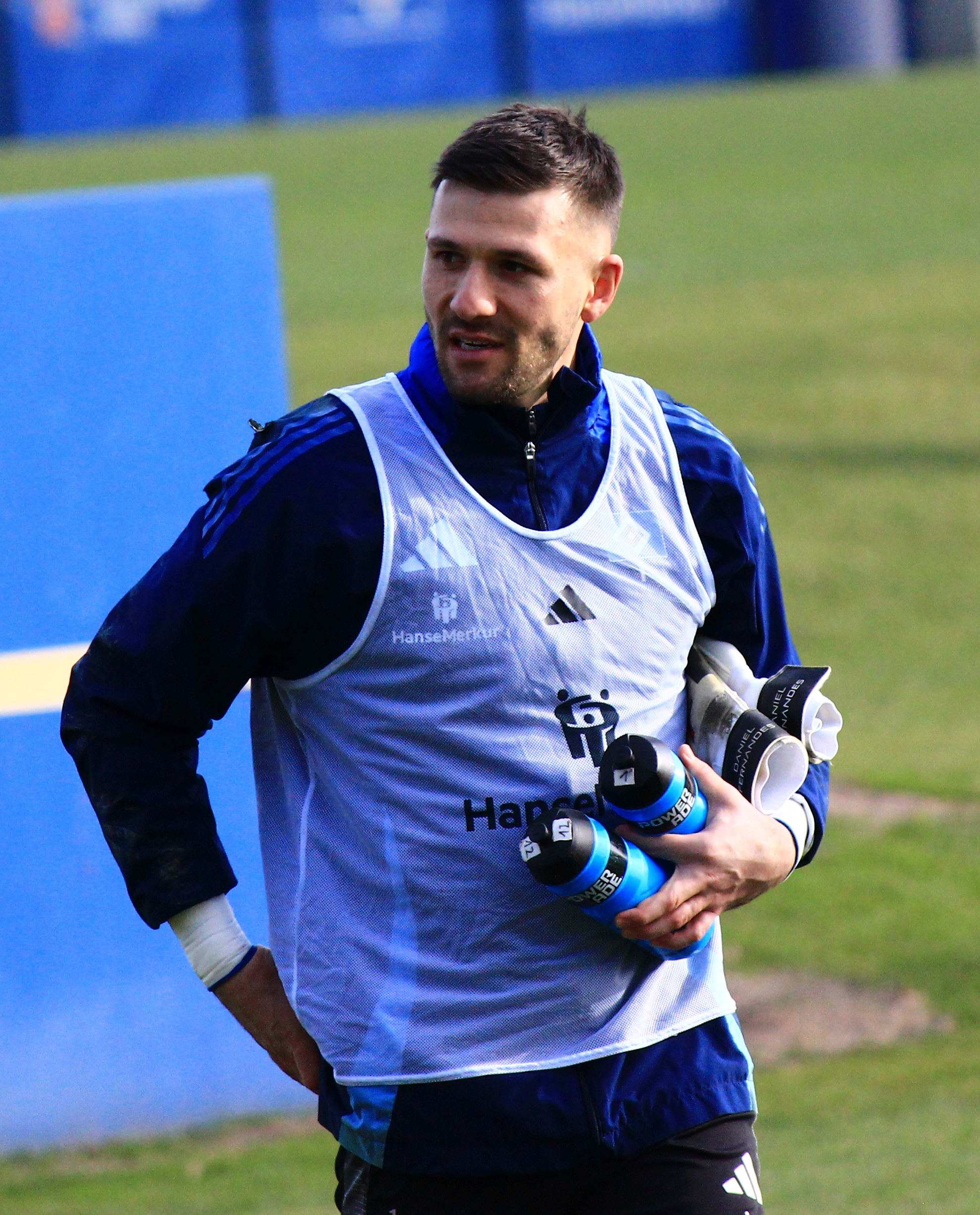
- Heuer Fernandes in 2025 with Hamburger SV

Personal information
- Full name: Daniel Heuer Fernandes
- Date of birth: 13 November 1992 (age 33)
- Place of birth: Bochum, Germany
- Height: 1.88 m (6 ft 2 in)
- Position: Goalkeeper

Team information
- Current team: Hamburger SV
- Number: 1

Youth career
- VfB Langendreerholz
- –2008: SV Langendreer 04
- 2008–2010: VfL Bochum
- 2010–2011: Borussia Dortmund

Senior career*
Years	Team	Apps	(Gls)
2011–2013	VfL Bochum II	48	(0)
2013–2015	VfL Osnabrück	60	(0)
2015–2016	SC Paderborn	13	(0)
2016–2019	Darmstadt 98	69	(0)
2019–	Hamburger SV	182	(0)

International career
2012–2015	Portugal U21	6	(0)
Medal record
Men's football
Representing Portugal
UEFA European Under-21 Championship
Runner-up	2015 Czech Republic
- * Club domestic league appearances and goals as of 1 November 2026

Daniel Heuer Fernandes (born 13 November 1992) is a professional footballer who plays a goalkeeper for Bundesliga club Hamburger SV. Born in Germany, he has represented Portugal at youth level.

== Early life ==
Daniel Heuer Fernandes was born in Bochum to a Portuguese father and a German mother. He grew up in the Bochum-quarter of Langendreer and has both German and Portuguese nationality.

== Club career ==
=== Early years ===
Heuer Fernandes' youth career included stints at VfL Bochum and Borussia Dortmund. He played for VfL Bochum II for two seasons. During the 2011–12 season, he made 14 appearances and during the 2012–13 season, he made 34 appearances.

=== From 3. Liga to Bundesliga ===
He played for VfL Osnabrück during the 2013–14 and 2014–15 seasons. During the 2013–14 season, he made 36 appearances. During the 2014–15 season, he made 26 appearances.

In July 2015, Heuer Fernandes left 3. Liga side VfL Osnabrück to join freshly relegated and then 2. Bundesliga club SC Paderborn. He signed a two-year contract until 2017. He played in matchday 22 to matchday 34 for a total of 13 matches.

He moved to SV Darmstadt 98 in July 2016. During the 2016–17 season, he made seven appearances. During the 2017–18 season, he made 29 appearances.

=== Hamburger SV ===
For the 2019–20 season, Heuer Fernandes moved to league competitor Hamburger SV for €1.3 million, with whom he received a contract that ran until 30 June 2022. At HSV he beat out Julian Pollersbeck to become the starting goalkeeper as part of the preparation for the season. Heuer Fernandes was rarely able to convince, however. Sports magazine kicker even wrote after the 2–3 loss in the top match against to VfB Stuttgart on 28 May 2020: "Obviously, even with the clumsy penalty committed by Daniel Heuer Fernandes in Stuttgart, it became clear that HSV had no support in goal." Up to this point, Heuer Fernandes had played 30 competitive games for HSV and had to concede 37 goals; only in 7 games had he not conceded a goal. For the next match on 31 May, Pollersbeck returned in the HSV goal, while Tom Mickel remained the backup and Heuer Fernandes was not considered for the matchday squad for the first time since his move. From matchday 30, Heuer Fernandes was given Mickel's spot as the backup. Without Fernandes in goal, HSV failed to get promoted and finished 4th in the league table at the end of the season.

Daniel Thioune took over as head coach of the team for the 2020–21 season. Under him, Heuer Fernandes was initially the starting goalkeeper again, after which Pollersbeck moved to French Ligue 1 club Lyon. The German-Portuguese keeper was the starter in the 4–1 loss in the DFB-Pokal against 3. Liga team Dynamo Dresden and in the two opening wins in the league before Mickel took over in goal. HSV then signed another goalkeeper, Sven Ulreich, who had been Manuel Neuer's backup at Bayern Munich for the past 5 years, whereupon Heuer Fernandes once again became the backup in the HSV goal.

On 1 December 2023, Heuer Fernandes scored a bizarre own goal during the Hamburg derby against FC St. Pauli. In an attempt to clear his lines following a miscued back pass from Guilherme Ramos, he inadvertently struck the ball into his own net, resulting in a 2–2 draw.

== International career ==
On 15 October 2012, Heuer Fernandes made his first appearance for the Portuguese national under-21 team in a friendly against Ukraine. He was a part of the squad of the Portuguese under 21 team for the 2015 UEFA European Under-21 Championship in Czech Republic, where the Lusitanians reached the final, where the team lost against Sweden after the penalty shoot out.

== Career statistics ==
As of match played 1 November 2026

Appearances and goals by club, season and competition
Club	Season	League			DFB-Pokal		Other		Total		Ref.
Club	Season	Division	Apps	Goals	Apps	Goals	Apps	Goals	Apps	Goals	Ref.
VfL Bochum II	2011–12	Regionalliga West	14	0	—		—		14	0	
VfL Bochum II	2012–13	Regionalliga West	34	0	—		—		34	0	
VfL Bochum II	Total		48	0	—		—		48	0	—
VfL Osnabrück	2013–14	3. Liga	34	0	2	0	—		36	0	
VfL Osnabrück	2014–15	3. Liga	26	0	0	0	—		26	0	
VfL Osnabrück	Total		60	0	2	0	—		62	0	—
SC Paderborn	2015–16	2. Bundesliga	13	0	0	0	—		13	0	
Darmstadt 98	2016–17	Bundesliga	7	0	0	0	—		7	0	
Darmstadt 98	2017–18	2. Bundesliga	28	0	1	0	—		29	0	
Darmstadt 98	2018–19	2. Bundesliga	34	0	2	0	—		36	0	
Darmstadt 98	Total		69	0	3	0	—		72	0	—
Hamburger SV	2019–20	2. Bundesliga	28	0	2	0	—		30	0	
Hamburger SV	2020–21	2. Bundesliga	2	0	1	0	—		3	0	
Hamburger SV	2021–22	2. Bundesliga	27	0	5	0	2 (Note: Appearances in Bundesliga promotion play-offs)	0	34	0	
Hamburger SV	2022–23	2. Bundesliga	33	0	2	0	2	0	37	0	
Hamburger SV	2023–24	2. Bundesliga	20	0	0	0	—		20	0	
Hamburger SV	2024–25	2. Bundesliga	31	0	1	0	—		32	0	
Hamburger SV	2025–26	Bundesliga	33	0	1	0	—		34	0	
Hamburger SV	2026–27	Bundesliga	8	0	0	0	—		8	0	
Hamburger SV	Total		182	0	12	0	4	0	198	0	—
Career total			372	0	17	0	4	0	393	0	—
