= 2024–25 Hamburger SV season =

Hamburger SV
2024–25 season
- President: Marcell Jansen
- Head coach: Steffen Baumgart (until 24 November); Merlin Polzin (from 25 November)
- Stadium: Volksparkstadion
- 2. Bundesliga: 2nd (promoted)
- DFB-Pokal: Second round
- Top goalscorer: League: Davie Selke (22); All: Davie Selke (23)
- Average home league attendance: 56,324
- Biggest win: SV Meppen 1–7 Hamburger SV
Home colours	Away colours	Third colours

The 2024–25 season was the 137th season in the history of Hamburger SV, and the club's seventh consecutive season in the 2. Bundesliga. In addition to the domestic league, the club participated in the DFB-Pokal, where they were eliminated in the second round.

Hamburger SV confirmed their promotion back to the Bundesliga on 10 May 2025, following a 6–1 home win against SSV Ulm. However, they lost the 2. Bundesliga title after 1. FC Köln won 4–0 against 1. FC Kaiserslautern on the final matchday, while Hamburg lost 3–2 to Greuther Fürth.

== Summary ==
On 1 July, Hamburg FC announced the signing of Libyan midfielder Daniel Elfadli for an undisclosed fee.

== Transfers ==
=== In ===
Pos.	Player	Transferred from	Fee	Date	Source
FW	(Burkina Faso) Daouda Beleme	(Germany) VfB Lübeck	Loan return	30 June 2024	
DF	(Germany) Jonas David	(Germany) Hansa Rostock	Loan return	30 June 2024	
GK	(Sweden) Marko Johansson	(Germany) Hansa Rostock	Loan return	30 June 2024	
GK	(Germany) Leo Oppermann	(Germany) Arminia Bielefeld	Loan return	30 June 2024	
DF	(Kosovo) Valon Zumberi	(Switzerland) FC Schaffhausen	Loan return	30 June 2024	
MF	(Poland) Łukasz Poręba	(France) RC Lens	Undisclosed	1 July 2024	
MF	(Libya) Daniel Elfadli	(Germany) 1. FC Magdeburg	Undisclosed	1 July 2024	
MF	(Czech Republic) Adam Karabec	(Czech Republic) Sparta Prague	Loan	4 July 2024	
FW	(Germany) Davie Selke	(Germany) 1. FC Köln	Free	11 July 2024	
DF	(Switzerland) Silvan Hefti	(Italy) Genoa	€1,600,000	4 August 2024	

=== Out ===
Pos.	Player	Transferred to	Fee	Date	Source
DF	(Belgium) Ignace Van der Brempt	(Austria) Red Bull Salzburg	Loan return	30 June 2024	
DF	(Bosnia and Herzegovina) Dennis Hadžikadunić	(Russia) FC Rostov	Loan return	30 June 2024	
MF	(Japan) Masaya Okugawa	(Germany) FC Augsburg	Loan return	30 June 2024	
DF	(Ghana) Stephan Ambrosius	(Switzerland) St. Gallen	End of contract	1 July 2024	
GK	(Germany) Leo Oppermann	(Germany) Arminia Bielefeld	Undisclosed	1 July 2024	
MF	(Slovakia) László Bénes	(Germany) Union Berlin	€6,000,000	1 July 2024	
FW	(Germany) Tom Sanne	(Germany) Hannover 96 II	Loan	27 July 2024	
DF	(Portugal) Guilherme Ramos	(Portugal) Santa Clara	Loan	2 September 2024	
MF	(Finland) Anssi Suhonen	(Germany) Jahn Regensburg	Loan	3 January 2025	

== Friendlies ==
On 24 May, Hamburg announced the scheduling of a friendly match on 6 July hosted by Lower Saxony club TuS Neetze. Preparation for the season started on 29 June. The club held a training camp from 1 to 6 July in Schneeverdingen and from 16 to 25 July in Bramberg am Wildkogel, Austria.

=== Pre-season ===
6 July 2024 Friendly	TuS Neetze	0–12	Hamburger SV	Neetze
14:00			Reis 17', 35' (pen.); Németh 21', 39'; Pherai 47'; Poręba 53', 88'; Yalçınkaya 64', 75'; Königsdörffer 73'; Stange 76', 90+1'	Stadium: Neetzer Jahnstadion

12 July 2024 Friendly	Hamburger SV	5–1	SV Drochtersen/Assel	Drochtersen
19:00	Königsdörffer 22'; Hadžikadunić 36'; Dompé 48'; Heyer 68'; Karabec 86'	Report	Reincke 41'	Stadium: Kehdinger Stadion; Attendance: 4,000

13 July 2024 Friendly	VfB Lübeck	2–5	Hamburger SV	Lübeck
17:00	Bukusu 28' (pen.); Wahl 45+1'	Report	Ramos 52'; Karabec 63'; Dompé 67', 84', 88'	Stadium: Stadion Lohmühle; Attendance: 10,100; Referee: Luca Jürgensen

20 July 2024 Friendly	Hamburger SV	4–2	FC Nantes	Saalfelden am Steinernen Meer, Austria
15:00	Heyer 72'; Hadžikadunić 82'; Baldé 86'; Jatta 98'	Report	Mahamoud 10'; Pallois 26'	Stadium: 1508 SaalfeldenArena
Note: Two periods of 60 minutes

21 July 2024 Friendly	Hamburger SV	0–3	Cardiff City	Bramberg, Austria
16:00		Report	Tanner 48'; Davies 69'; Robinson 89'	Stadium: Smaragdarena Bramberg

25 July 2024 Friendly	Hamburger SV	0–0	Aris Limassol	Kufstein, Austria
14:00				Stadium: Kufstein-Arena

=== Mid-season ===
5 September 2024 Friendly	Hamburger SV	0–1	Holstein Kiel	Germany
13:00		Report	Harres 57'

13 November 2024 Friendly	Hamburger SV	2–4	Twente	Germany
16:00	Selke 1', 45' (pen.)	Report	Panneflek 39'; Steijn 51'; Vlap 72', 85'	Referee: Jarno Wienefeld

6 January 2025 Friendly	Hamburger SV	2–0	Alemannia Aachen	Turkey
12:30 UTC+3	Sahiti 17'; Jatta 57'

10 January 2025 Friendly	FCSB	2–1	Hamburger SV

19 March 2025 Friendly	Hamburger SV	3–0	Phönix Lübeck
13:00	Glatzel 16' (pen.); Selke 53'; Richter 70'

== Competitions ==
=== Overall record ===
Competition	First match	Last match	Starting round	Final position	Record							
Competition	First match	Last match	Starting round	Final position	Pld	W	D	L	GF	GA	GD	Win %
2. Bundesliga	2 August 2024	18 May 2025	Matchday 1	2nd	34	16	11	7	78	44	+34	47.06
DFB-Pokal	18 August 2024	30 October 2024	First round	Second round	2	1	0	1	8	3	+5	50.00
Total					36	17	11	8	86	47	+39	47.22

Source: Competitions

=== 2. Bundesliga ===
==== League table ====
Pos	Team	Pld	W	D	L	GF	GA	GD	Pts	Promotion, qualification or relegation
1	1. FC Köln (C, P)	34	18	7	9	53	38	+15	61	Promotion to Bundesliga
2	Hamburger SV (P)	34	16	11	7	78	44	+34	59	Promotion to Bundesliga
3	SV Elversberg	34	16	10	8	64	37	+27	58	Qualification for promotion play-offs
4	SC Paderborn	34	15	10	9	56	46	+10	55	
5	1. FC Magdeburg	34	14	11	9	64	52	+12	53	

Source: Bundesliga
Rules for classification: 1) Points; 2) Goal difference; 3) Goals scored; 4) Head-to-head results; 5) Head-to-head away goals scored; 6) Away goals scored; 7) Play-off.
(Rules 4–6 only apply after home and away matches have been played between the tied teams.)
(C) Champions; (P) Promoted

==== Results summary ====
Overall								Home						Away					
Pld	W	D	L	GF	GA	GD	Pts	W	D	L	GF	GA	GD	W	D	L	GF	GA	GD
34	16	11	7	78	44	+34	59	8	7	3	44	24	+20	8	4	4	34	20	+14

Source: DFB

==== Results by round ====
Round	1	2	3	4	5	6	7	8	9	10	11	12	13	14	15	16	17	18	19	20	21	22	23	24	25	26	27	28	29	30	31	32	33	34
Ground	A	H	A	H	H	A	H	A	H	A	H	A	H	A	H	A	H	H	A	H	A	A	H	A	H	A	H	A	H	A	H	A	H	A
Result	W	D	L	W	W	D	D	W	W	L	D	L	D	W	D	D	W	W	W	D	W	D	W	L	W	W	D	W	L	D	L	W	W	L
Position	6	7	12	7	4	5	6	5	3	5	4	5	8	2	7	8	3	1	1	2	2	2	1	1	1	1	2	1	1	2	2	1	1	2

Source: DFB
A = Away; H = Home; W = Win; D = Draw; L = Loss

==== Matches ====
The match schedule was released on 4 July 2024.

2 August 2024 1	1. FC Köln	1–2	Hamburger SV	Cologne
20:30	Lemperle (yellow card) 39'; Pauli (yellow card) 69'; Maina 78'	Report	Königsdörffer 5', 35', (yellow card) 86'; Muheim (yellow card) 45+2'	Stadium: RheinEnergieStadion; Attendance: 50,000; Referee: Max Burda

10 August 2024 2	Hamburger SV	1–1	Hertha BSC	Hamburg
20:30	Königsdörffer 11'; Elfadli (yellow card) 39'; Schonlau (yellow card) 61'	Report	Dudziak (yellow card) 35'; Zeefuik (yellow card) 84'; Kenny 86'	Stadium: Volksparkstadion; Attendance: 57,000; Referee: Timo Gerach

23 August 2024 3	Hannover 96	1–0	Hamburger SV	Hanover
18:30	Dehm (yellow card) 38'; Ngankam 49' (pen.), (yellow card) 58'; Rochelt (yellow card) 79'; Voglsammer (yellow card) 81'	Report	Schonlau (yellow card) 28' (yellow-red card) 90+3'; Hefti (yellow card) 38'; Selke (yellow card) 47'	Stadium: Niedersachsenstadion; Attendance: 49,000; Referee: Patrick Alt

31 August 2024 4	Hamburger SV	4–1	Preußen Münster	Hamburg
13:00	Glatzel 6', 45+1'; Elfadli 26'; Heyer 64'	Report	Paetow 58'	Stadium: Volksparkstadion; Referee: Daniel Siebert

15 September 2024 5	Hamburger SV	5–0	Jahn Regensburg	Hamburg
13:30	Königsdörffer 1', (yellow card) 3'; Glatzel 14'; Hefti (yellow card) 45+2'; Baldé (yellow card) 48'; Dompé 76', 90+3'; Sahiti (yellow card) 83'; Selke 89'	Report	Schönfelder (yellow card) 30'; Geipl (yellow card) 45+3'; Viet (yellow card) 55'; Ballas (yellow card) 68'; Ochojski (yellow card) 89'	Stadium: Volksparkstadion; Referee: Robin Braun

21 September 2024 6	1. FC Kaiserslautern	2–2	Hamburger SV	Kaiserslautern
20:30	Ache 33'; Wekesser (yellow card) 38'; Tachie 50'; Kaloc (yellow card) 78'	Report	Hadžikadunić (yellow card) 29'; Hefti (yellow card) 45+3'; Glatzel 58'; Selke (yellow card) 62', (goal) 90+5'	Stadium: Fritz-Walter-Stadion; Referee: Florian Exner

28 September 2024 7	Hamburger SV	2–2	SC Paderborn	Hamburg
13:00	Karabec (yellow card) 43'; Glatzel 54'; Selke 67'; Schonlau (yellow card) 78'; Muheim (yellow card) 81'	Report	Curda (yellow card) 27'; Bilbija 46', 60'; Obermair (yellow card) 62'; Brackelmann (yellow card) 75'	Stadium: Volksparkstadion; Referee: Florian Badstübner

6 October 2024 8	Fortuna Düsseldorf	0–3	Hamburger SV	Düsseldorf
13:30 UTC+2	Fridriksson (yellow card) 35'; Haag (red card) 81'; Hoffmann (yellow card) 85'	Report	Dompé 8'; Schonlau (yellow card) 45'; Katterbach (yellow card) 65'; Glatzel 83' (pen.), 90'	Stadium: Merkur Spiel-Arena; Attendance: 51,500; Referee: Martin Petersen

20 October 2024 9	Hamburger SV	3–1	1. FC Magdeburg	Hamburg
13:30 UTC+2	Königsdörffer 5'; Katterbach 42'; Selke 45+1'; Schonlau (red card) 57'; Reis (yellow card) 66'; Muheim (yellow card) 67'	Report	Hankouri (yellow card) 15'; Burcu (yellow card) 60'; Kaars 63' (pen.)	Stadium: Volksparkstadion; Attendance: 57,000; Referee: Sven Jablonski

26 October 2024 10	SV Elversberg	4–2	Hamburger SV	Spiesen-Elversberg
13:00 UTC+1	Asllani 41', 53'; Schnellbacher 63'; Kristof (yellow card) 90+1'; Fellhauer 90+6'	Report	Selke 6', 83'; Reis (yellow card) 56'; Meffert (yellow card) 76' (yellow-red card) 84'; Heyer (yellow card) 90+5'; Karabec (yellow card) 90+9'	Stadium: Waldstadion an der Kaiserlinde; Referee: D. Kampka

3 November 2024 11	Hamburger SV	1–1	1. FC Nürnberg	Hamburg
13:30 UTC+1	Elfadli 15'; Mikelbrencis (yellow card) 85'	Report	Emreli 63', (yellow card) 65'; Soares (yellow card) 67'; Tzimas (yellow card) 81'	Stadium: Volksparkstadion; Referee: T. Bauer

8 November 2024 12	Eintracht Braunschweig	3–1	Hamburger SV	Braunschweig
18:30 UTC+1	Bell Bell (yellow card) 11'; Philippe 35', 65'; Krauße (yellow card) 37'; Sanchez 49'; Ivanov (yellow card) 87'	Report	Baldé (yellow card) 61'; Poręba 73'; Selke (yellow card) 87'	Stadium: Eintracht-Stadion; Referee: Daniel Siebert

23 November 2024 13	Hamburger SV	2–2	Schalke 04	Hamburg
20:30 UTC+1	Katterbach (yellow card) 10'; Richter 29'; Königsdörffer 30'; Poręba (yellow card) 75'		Paul Seguin (yellow card) 12'; Amin Younes 57'; Karaman 74'; Grüger (yellow card) 83'	Stadium: Volksparkstadion

1 December 2024 14	Karlsruher SC	1–3	Hamburger SV	Karlsruhe
13:30 UTC+1	Schleusener 36'; Burnić (yellow card) 56'; Nicolai Rapp (yellow card) 61'; Zivzivadze (yellow card) 68'; Marcel Franke (yellow card) 90+2'		Dompé 23', 55', (yellow card) 85'; Königsdörffer (yellow card) 72'; Elfadli (yellow card) 88'; Selke 87', (yellow card) 90+2'	Stadium: Wildparkstadion

8 December 2024 15	Hamburger SV	2–2	Darmstadt	Hamburg
13:30 CET	Königsdörffer 10'; Karabec 45'; Poręba (yellow card) 81'; Elfadli (yellow card) 88'	Report	Förster (yellow card) 31'; Vukotić 33' (yellow card) 45+1'; Hornby (yellow card) 45+1'; Corredor 63'; Marseiler (yellow card) 89'	Stadium: Volksparkstadion; Attendance: 51,616; Referee: (Germany) Eric Weisbach

14 December 2024 16	Ulm	1–1	Hamburger SV	Ulm
13:00 CET	Chessa (yellow card) 21'; Keller 34'; Telalović (yellow card) 41'; Max Brandt (yellow card) 90+5'	Report	Jatta (yellow card) 9'; Elfadli (yellow card) 41' (yellow-red card) 68'; Richter (yellow card) 45+2'; Selke 49'; Königsdörffer (yellow card) 90+3'; Muheim (yellow card) 90+4'	Stadium: Donaustadion; Attendance: 17,400; Referee: (Germany) Patrick Alt

21 December 2024 17	Hamburger SV	5–0	Greuther Fürth	Hamburg
13:00 CET	Hadžikadunić 1' (yellow card) 54'; Selke 11' 59'; Karabec 13'; Pherai (yellow card) 24'; Otto Stange 76'	Report	Mustapha (yellow card) 35'	Stadium: Volksparkstadion; Attendance: 54,786; Referee: (Germany) Timo Gerach

18 January 2025 18	Hamburger SV	1–0	1. FC Köln	Hamburg
20:45 CET	Pherai (yellow card) 13'; Königsdörffer 78'; Elfadli (yellow card) 84'; Mikelbrencis (yellow card) 90+5'	Report	Gazibegović (yellow card) 6'; Waldschmidt (yellow card) 55'; Hübers (yellow card) 73'; Finkgräfe (yellow card) 77'	Stadium: Volksparkstadion; Attendance: 57,000; Referee: (Germany) Christian Dingert

25 January 2025 19	Hertha BSC	2–3	Hamburger SV	Berlin
20:30 CET	Niederlechner (yellow card) 62'; Cuisance 72'; Winkler 80'	Report	Sahiti (yellow card) 3' (goal) 84'; Hadžikadunić (yellow card) 11'; Selke 23'; Königsdörffer 61'; Poręba (yellow card) 88'; Muheim (yellow card) 90+5'	Stadium: Olympiastadion; Attendance: 71,500; Referee: (Germany) Tobias Welz

2 February 2025 20	Hamburger SV	2–2	Hannover 96	Hamburg
13:30 CET	Hefti 15'; Meffert (yellow card) 70'; Dompé 84'; Reis (yellow card) 86'; Mebude (yellow card) 90'; Elfadli (yellow card) 90+1'	Report	Wdowik (yellow card) 39'; Halstenberg (yellow card) 42'; Tresoldi 52'; Matondo 79'	Stadium: Volksparkstadion; Attendance: 57,000; Referee: (Germany) Michael Bacher

7 February 2025 21	Preußen Münster	1–2	Hamburger SV	Münster
18:30 CET	Frenkert 24' (yellow card) 90+3'; Friðjónsson (yellow card) 90+8'; Lorenz (yellow card) 90+9'	Report	Selke 45+3' 90+4' (pen.); Schonlau (yellow card) 70'; Dompé (yellow card) 84'	Stadium: Preußenstadion; Attendance: 12,422; Referee: (Germany) Wolfgang Haslberger

16 February 2025 22	Jahn Regensburg	1–1	Hamburger SV	Regensburg
13:30 CET	Adamyan 6'; Suhonen (yellow card) 56'	Report	Richter (yellow card) 31'; Sahiti (yellow card) 74' (yellow-red card) 76'; Reis (yellow card) 76'; Selke 83' (pen.); Elfadli (yellow card) 90+1'	Stadium: Jahnstadion Regensburg; Attendance: 15,210; Referee: (Germany) Lars Erbst

21 February 2025 23	Hamburger SV	3–0	1. FC Kaiserslautern	Hamburg
18:30 CET	Selke 42' 65'; Mebude (yellow card) 58'; Fabio Baldé 78'	Report	Redondo (yellow card) 90+3'	Stadium: Volksparkstadion; Attendance: 57,000; Referee: (Germany) Sören Storks

2 March 2025 24	Paderborn	2–0	Hamburger SV	Paderborn
13:30 CET	Bilbija 15'; Grimaldi 84'			Stadium: Home Deluxe Arena; Attendance: 15,000; Referee: (Germany) Robert Kampka

8 March 2025 25	Hamburger SV	4–1	Fortuna Düsseldorf	Hamburg
20:30 CET	Muheim 7'; Selke 40'; Karabec 66'; Stange 90+4'		Kownacki 18'	Stadium: Volksparkstadion; Attendance: 57,000; Referee: (Germany) Florian Exner

14 March 2025 26	1. FC Magdeburg	0–3	Hamburger SV	Magdeburg
18:30 CET			Königsdörffer 9' 53'; Mathisen 15' (o.g.)	Stadium: Avnet Arena; Attendance: 27,270; Referee: (Germany) Tobias Stieler

28 March 2025 27	Hamburger SV	0–0	Elversberg	Hamburg
18:30 CET				Stadium: Volksparkstadion; Attendance: 56,328; Referee: (Germany) Felix Prigan

5 April 2025 28	1. FC Nürnberg	0–3	Hamburger SV	Nürnberg
11:00 CET	Antiste (red card) 16'		Dompé 8', 37'; Glatzel 84'	Stadium: Max-Morlock-Stadion; Attendance: 47,300; Referee: (Germany) Timo Gerach

11 April 2025 29	Hamburger SV	2–4	Eintracht Braunschweig	Hamburg
16:30 CET	Selke 74', 90+5'		Bell 40'; Hefti 41' (o.g.); Baas 84'; Philippe 85'	Stadium: Volksparkstadion; Attendance: 57,000; Referee: (Germany) Felix Brych

19 April 2025 30	Schalke 04	2–2	Hamburger SV	Gelsenkirchen
18:30 CET	Karaman (red card) 3'; Schallenberg 15'; Sylla 81'		Sahiti 41', 43'	Stadium: Veltins-Arena; Attendance: 62,077; Referee: (Germany) Harm Osmers

27 April 2025 31	Hamburger SV	1–2	Karlsruher SC	Hamburg
11:30 CET	Selke 42' (pen.)		Ben Farhat 30'; Wanitzek 45+3'	Stadium: Volksparkstadion

3 May 2025 32	Darmstadt	0–4	Hamburger SV	Darmstadt
11:00 CET			Reis 23'; Königsdörffer 58'; Selke 80'; Glatzel 90+5'	Stadium: Merck-Stadion am Böllenfalltor

10 May 2025 33	Hamburger SV	6–1	Ulm	Hamburg
18:30 CET	Reis 10'; Muheim (yellow card) 35'; Sahiti (yellow card) 40'; Königsdörffer 42', 62'; Selke 45+4'; Strompf 49' (o.g.); Mikelbrencis (yellow card) 73'; Elfadli 86'		Gaal 7', (yellow card) 61'	Stadium: Volksparkstadion

18 May 2025 34	Greuther Fürth	3–2	Hamburger SV	Fürth
13:30 CET	Marco John (yellow card) 17'; Klaus 41', 57' (pen.), 63', (yellow card) 87'; Jung (yellow card) 90'; Gießelmann (yellow card) 90+7'		Dompé 50'; Glatzel 67' (pen.); Selke (yellow card) 90'	Stadium: Sportpark Ronhof Thomas Sommer

=== DFB-Pokal ===
18 August 2024 First round	SV Meppen	1–7	Hamburger SV	Meppen
18:00	Haritonov 90'	Report	Pherai 17', 50'; Muheim 31'; Selke 56'; Baldé 71'; Pünt 80' (o.g.); Glatzel 89'	Stadium: Hänsch-Arena; Attendance: 12,959; Referee: Felix Zwayer

30 October 2024 Second round	SC Freiburg	2–1	Hamburger SV	Freiburg
18:00 CET (UTC+1)	Ginter 19'; Grifo 44' (pen.)	Report	Meffert 51'	Stadium: Europa-Park Stadion; Attendance: 34,500; Referee: Felix Brych
