= Nicolas Oliveira (footballer, born 2004) =

German footballer (born 2004)

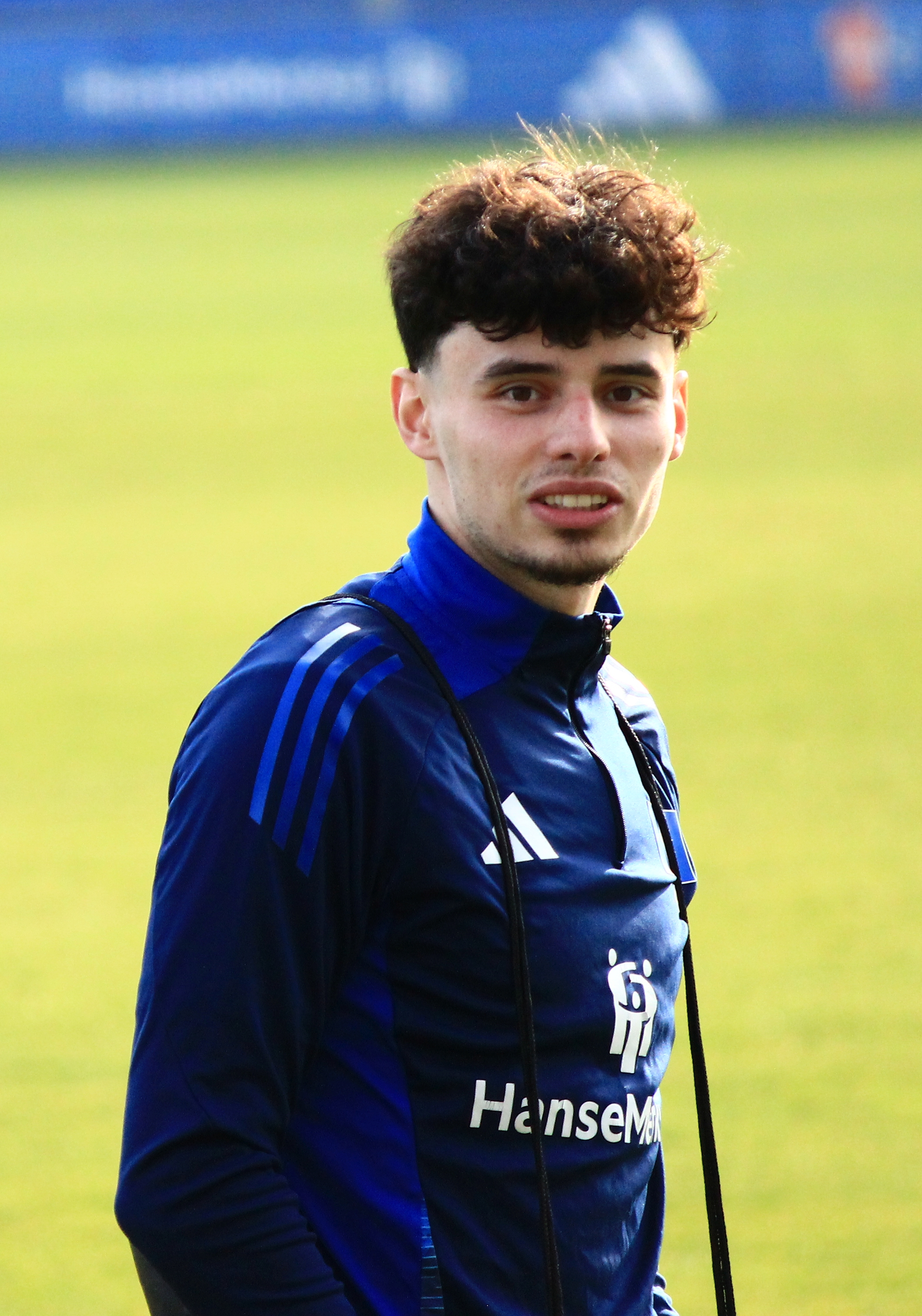
- Nicolas Oliveira (2025)

Personal information
- Full name: Nicolas-Bernd Oliveira Kisilowski
- Date of birth: 6 February 2004 (age 22)
- Place of birth: Oviedo, Spain
- Height: 1.87 m (6 ft 1 1/2 in)
- Position: Full-back

Team information
- Current team: Jahn Regensburg
- Number: 25

Youth career
- 2007–2009: Eimsbütteler TV
- 2018–2023: Hamburger SV

Senior career*
Years	Team	Apps	(Gls)
2022–2025	Hamburger SV II	60	(2)
2023–2025	Hamburger SV	5	(0)
2025–	Jahn Regensburg	35	(3)

International career^{‡}
2022–2023	Germany U19	8	(0)
2023–2024	Germany U20	8	(0)
- * Club domestic league appearances and goals as of 14:51, 26 September 2026 (UTC) ‡ National team caps and goals as of 25 March 2024

Nicolas-Bernd Oliveira Kisilowski (born 6 February 2004) is a professional footballer who plays as a full-back for 3. Liga club Jahn Regensburg. Born in Spain, he is a youth international for Germany.

== Club career ==
Oliveira is a youth product of Eimsbütteler TV before moving to Hamburger SV in 2018 at the age of 14. On 20 June 2022, he was promoted to Hamburger's reserves in the Regionalliga. On 21 July 2023, he signed a professional contract with Hamburg until 2026. He made his professional debut with Hamburg in a 5–3 2. Bundesliga win over Schalke 04 on 28 July 2023.

On 3 July 2025, Oliveira signed a two-year deal with Jahn Regensburg in 3. Liga.

== International career ==
Born in Spain, Oliveira was born to a German father and Spanish mother and moved to Germany at a young age. He is a youth international for Germany, having played for the Germany U20s.

== Career statistics ==
As of match played 26 September 2026

Appearances and goals by club, season and competition
Club	Season	League			DFB-Pokal		Other		Total	
Club	Season	Division	Apps	Goals	Apps	Goals	Apps	Goals	Apps	Goals
Hamburger SV II	2021–22	Regionalliga Nord	0	0	—		2 (Note: Appearances in Regionalliga Nord Promotion play-offs)	0	2	0
Hamburger SV II	2022–23	Regionalliga Nord	23	0	—		—		23	0
Hamburger SV II	2023–24	Regionalliga Nord	18	1	—		—		18	1
Hamburger SV II	2024–25	Regionalliga Nord	19	1	—		—		19	1
Hamburger SV II	Total		60	2	—		2	0	62	2
Hamburger SV	2022–23	2. Bundesliga	0	0	0	0	0	0	0	0
Hamburger SV	2023–24	2. Bundesliga	4	0	1	0	—		5	0
Hamburger SV	2024–25	2. Bundesliga	1	0	0	0	—		1	0
Hamburger SV	Total		5	0	1	0	—		6	0
Jahn Regensburg	2025–26	3. Liga	32	2	1	0	0	0	33	2
Jahn Regensburg	2026–27	3. Liga	3	1	—		0	0	3	1
Jahn Regensburg	Total		35	3	1	0	0	0	36	3
Career total			100	3	2	0	2	0	104	3
