= Nicolas Oliveira =

Nicolas Oliveira may refer to:

- Nicolas Oliveira (swimmer) (born 1987), Brazilian freestyle swimmer
- Nicolás Olivera (footballer, born 1978), Uruguayan football forward
- Nicolas Oliveira (footballer, born 2004), German football full-back for Hamburg
