= 2022–23 Hamburger SV season =

Hamburger SV
2022–23 season
- President: Marcell Jansen
- Executive Board: Frank Wettstein; Jonas Boldt
- Head coach: Tim Walter
- Stadium: Volksparkstadion
- 2. Bundesliga: 3rd
- DFB-Pokal: Second round
- Top goalscorer: League: Robert Glatzel (19); All: Robert Glatzel (19)
Home colours	Away colours	Third colours

The 2022–23 season was the 104th in the history of Hamburger SV and their fifth consecutive season in the second division. The club participated in the 2. Bundesliga and DFB-Pokal.

== Players ==
=== First-team squad ===
As of 27 January 2023

Note: Flags indicate national team as defined under FIFA eligibility rules; some limited exceptions apply. Players may hold more than one non-FIFA nationality.

No.	Pos.	Nation	Player
1	GK	POR	Daniel Heuer Fernandes
2	DF	FRA	William Mikelbrencis
3	DF	GER	Moritz Heyer
4	DF	GER	Sebastian Schonlau (captain)
7	FW	GER	Filip Bilbija
8	MF	SVK	László Bénes
9	FW	GER	Robert Glatzel
10	MF	GER	Sonny Kittel
11	FW	GHA	Ransford-Yeboah Königsdörffer
12	GK	GER	Tom Mickel
14	MF	NED	Ludovit Reis
16	DF	ESP	Javi Montero (on loan from Beşiktaş)
17	MF	ENG	Xavier Amaechi
18	MF	GAM	Bakery Jatta
19	GK	GER	Matheo Raab

No.	Pos.	Nation	Player
20	FW	HUN	András Németh
23	MF	GER	Jonas Meffert
27	FW	FRA	Jean-Luc Dompé
28	DF	SUI	Miro Muheim
33	DF	GER	Noah Katterbach (on loan from Köln)
34	DF	GER	Jonas David
36	MF	FIN	Anssi Suhonen
37	DF	KOS	Valon Zumberi
40	GK	GER	Leo Oppermann
41	MF	EGY	Omar Megeed
42	MF	GER	Ogechika Heil
43	DF	GER	Bent Andresen
44	DF	CRO	Mario Vušković
45	FW	GER	Tom Sanne
46	MF	GER	Elijah Krahn

=== Out on loan ===
Note: Flags indicate national team as defined under FIFA eligibility rules; some limited exceptions apply. Players may hold more than one non-FIFA nationality.

No.	Pos.	Nation	Player
—	GK	SWE	Marko Johansson (at VfL Bochum until 30 June 2023)
—	DF	GER	Stephan Ambrosius (at Karlsruher SC until 30 June 2023)

No.	Pos.	Nation	Player
—	DF	GER	Maximilian Rohr (at SC Paderborn 07 until 30 June 2023)
—	FW	GER	Robin Meißner (at FC Viktoria Köln until 30 June 2023)

== Transfers ==
=== In ===
Pos.	Player	Transferred from	Fee	Date	Source
GK	(Germany) Matheo Raab	(Germany) 1. FC Kaiserslautern	Free	1 July 2022	
FW	(Germany) Filip Bilbija	(Germany) FC Ingolstadt	Free	1 July 2022	
DF	(Croatia) Mario Vušković	(Croatia) Hajduk Split	€3,000,000	1 July 2022	
MF	(Slovakia) László Bénes	(Germany) Borussia Mönchengladbach	€1,500,000	1 July 2022	
DF	(Switzerland) Miro Muheim	(Switzerland) St. Gallen	€1,500,000	1 July 2022	
MF	(Germany) Ransford-Yeboah Königsdörffer	(Germany) Dynamo Dresden	€1,200,000	1 July 2022	
MF	(France) Jean-Luc Dompé	(Belgium) Zulte Waregem	€1,100,000	18 August 2022	
DF	(France) William Mikelbrencis	(France) FC Metz	€700,000	31 August 2022	
FW	(Hungary) András Németh	(Belgium) KRC Genk	€750,000	27 January 2023	

== Pre-season and friendlies ==
Win Draw Loss

29 June 2022 Friendly	Hamburger SV	2–2	Hajduk Split	Fürstenfeld
17:30 CEST (UTC+2)	Glatzel 33'; Königsdörffer 88'	Report	Livaja 28'; Ćubelić 68'	Stadium: Rudolf-Gutmann-Stadion; Referee: Rene Eisner (Austria)

1 July 2022 Friendly	Hamburger SV	4–3	Aris Thessaloniki	Söchau
17:30 CEST (UTC+2)	Glatzel 8'; Peersman 22' (o.g.); Meißner 58'; Amaechi 59'	Report	Iturbe 4'; Mancini 11'; Peersman 35'	Stadium: Kräuterdorfstadion Söchau; Referee: Bernd Eigler (Austria)

9 July 2022 Friendly	Basel	1–5	Hamburger SV	Basel
15:30 CEST (UTC+2)	Amdouni 11' (pen.)		Bénes 15' (pen.); Reis 20'; Glatzel 30'; Amaechi 66'; Bilbija 90'	Stadium: St. Jakob-Park

22 September 2022 Friendly	Hamburger SV	2–2	Nordsjælland	Hamburg
13:30 CEST (UTC+2)	Sanne 82'; Suhonen 89'	Report	Hansen 58'; Nygren 72'	Stadium: Volksparkstadion

15 November 2022 Friendly	Orange County SC	0–1	Hamburger SV	Irvine, United States
20:00 PST (UTC−8)		Report	Königsdörffer 41'	Stadium: Championship Soccer Stadium; Attendance: 4,168; Referee: Samantha Martinez (United States)

18 November 2022 Friendly	Ventura County Fusion	0–7	Hamburger SV	Ventura, United States
20:00 PST (UTC−8)		Report	Bilbija 16'; Amaechi 19'; Glatzel 58', 64', 83'; Sanne 72'; Dompé 87'	Stadium: Ventura College Sportsplex; Attendance: 800

7 January 2023 Friendly	1. FC Köln	4–0	Hamburger SV	Cologne
15:30 CET (UTC+1)	Huseinbašić 48', 50'; Diehl 88'; Schindler 120'	Report		Stadium: Franz-Kremer-Stadion; Attendance: 5,700; Referee: Nico Fuchs
Note: Match was played in four 30-minute periods.

13 January 2023 Friendly	SC Freiburg	6–2	Hamburger SV	Sotogrande, Spain
12:30 CET (UTC+1)	Grifo 7' (pen.); Gulde 10'; Kyereh 11', 13'; Gregoritsch (penalty missed) 58'; Jeong 86'; Petersen 107'	Report	Glatzel 4', 32'	Stadium: Santa Maria Polo Cancha 1
Note: Match was played in two 45-minute periods plus a 50-minute period.

18 January 2023 Friendly	Vancouver Whitecaps FC	0–2	Hamburger SV	Marbella, Spain
15:00 CET (UTC+1)		Report	Glatzel 4', 60'	Stadium: Estadio Municipal de Marbella

== Competitions ==
=== Overall record ===
Competition	First match	Last match	Starting round	Final position	Record							
Competition	First match	Last match	Starting round	Final position	Pld	W	D	L	GF	GA	GD	Win %
2. Bundesliga	17 July 2022	28 May 2023	Matchday 1	3rd	34	20	6	8	70	45	+25	58.82
Bundesliga relegation play-offs	1 June 2023	5 June 2023	First leg	Runners-up	2	0	0	2	1	6	−5	0.00
DFB-Pokal	30 July 2022	18 October 2022	First round	Second round	2	1	0	1	3	5	−2	50.00
Total					38	21	6	11	74	56	+18	55.26

Source: Soccerway

=== 2. Bundesliga ===
==== League table ====
Pos	Team	Pld	W	D	L	GF	GA	GD	Pts	Promotion, qualification or relegation
1	1. FC Heidenheim (C, P)	34	19	10	5	67	36	+31	67	Promotion to Bundesliga
2	Darmstadt 98 (P)	34	20	7	7	50	33	+17	67	Promotion to Bundesliga
3	Hamburger SV	34	20	6	8	70	45	+25	66	Qualification for promotion play-offs
4	Fortuna Düsseldorf	34	17	7	10	60	43	+17	58	
5	FC St. Pauli	34	16	10	8	55	39	+16	58	

Source: DFB
Rules for classification: 1) Points; 2) Goal difference; 3) Goals scored; 4) Head-to-head results; 5) Head-to-head away goals scored; 6) Away goals scored; 7) Play-off.
(C) Champions; (P) Promoted

==== Results summary ====
Overall								Home						Away					
Pld	W	D	L	GF	GA	GD	Pts	W	D	L	GF	GA	GD	W	D	L	GF	GA	GD
34	20	6	8	70	45	+25	66	11	3	3	38	20	+18	9	3	5	32	25	+7

Source: DFB

==== Results by round ====
Round	1	2	3	4	5	6	7	8	9	10	11	12	13	14	15	16	17	18	19	20	21	22	23	24	25	26	27	28	29	30	31	32	33	34
Ground	A	H	H	A	H	A	H	A	H	A	H	A	H	A	H	A	H	H	A	A	H	A	H	A	H	A	H	A	H	A	H	A	H	A
Result	W	L	W	W	L	W	W	W	W	W	D	L	L	W	W	L	W	W	W	D	W	D	W	L	D	D	W	L	W	L	D	W	W	W
Position	2	8	4	4	5	3	2	2	1	1	1	3	3	2	2	2	2	2	2	2	2	2	2	3	3	3	2	3	3	3	3	3	3	3

Source: DFB
A = Away; H = Home; W = Win; D = Draw; L = Loss

==== Matches ====
The league fixtures were announced on 17 June 2022.

17 July 2022 1	Eintracht Braunschweig	0–2	Hamburger SV	Braunschweig
13:30 CEST (UTC+2)		Report	Glatzel 67', 76'	Stadium: Eintracht-Stadion; Attendance: 21,900; Referee: Timo Gerach

24 July 2022 2	Hamburger SV	0–1	Hansa Rostock	Hamburg
13:30 CEST (UTC+2)		Report	Schumacher 90+4'	Stadium: Volksparkstadion; Attendance: 54,500; Referee: Robert Kampka

6 August 2022 3	Hamburger SV	1–0	1. FC Heidenheim	Hamburg
13:00 CEST (UTC+2)	Glatzel 42'	Report		Stadium: Volksparkstadion; Attendance: 43,094; Referee: Robert Hartmann

13 August 2022 4	Arminia Bielefeld	0–2	Hamburger SV	Bielefeld
13:00 CEST (UTC+2)	Vasiliadis (yellow card) 30'; Hack (yellow card) 64'; Bello (yellow card) 76'; Hüsing (yellow card) 86'	Report	Königsdörffer 28'; Heyer (yellow card) 51'; Bénes 74'	Stadium: Bielefelder Alm; Attendance: 26,875; Referee: Marco Fritz

19 August 2022 5	Hamburger SV	1–2	Darmstadt	Hamburg
18:30 CEST (UTC+2)	Meffert (yellow card) 55'; Opoku (yellow card) 60' (red card) 64'; Glatzel (yellow card) 62'; Königsdörffer 87' (red card) 89'	Report	Pfeiffer 4'; Tietz 7' (yellow card) 61'; Gjasula (yellow card) 30' (yellow-red card) 58'; Holland (yellow card) 65'; Bader (yellow card) 69'	Stadium: Volksparkstadion; Attendance: 43,943; Referee: Robert Schröder

27 August 2022 6	Nürnberg	0–2	Hamburger SV	Nürnberg
20:30 CEST (UTC+2)	Sadik Fofana (yellow card) 89'	Report	Glatzel (yellow card) 19' (goal) 90+2'; Vušković 37'; Reis (yellow card) 73'	Stadium: Max-Morlock-Stadion; Attendance: 35,713; Referee: Felix Zwayer

3 September 2022 7	Hamburger SV	1–0	Karlsruher SC	Hamburg
20:30 CEST (UTC+2)	Muheim (yellow card) 34'; Reis 43'	Report	Nebel (yellow card) 79'; Ambrosius (yellow card) 81'	Stadium: Volksparkstadion; Attendance: 45,623; Referee: Tobias Reichel

9 September 2022 8	Holstein Kiel	2–3	Hamburger SV	Kiel
18:30 CEST (UTC+2)	Heyer 90+2' (o.g.); Bartels 90+3'	Report	Glatzel 39'; Schonlau (yellow card) 51'; Heyer 69'; Muheim (yellow card) 79'; Reis 85'	Stadium: Holstein-Stadion; Attendance: 15,034; Referee: Daniel Siebert (referee)

17 September 2022 9	Hamburger SV	2–0	Fortuna Düsseldorf	Hamburg
20:30 CEST (UTC+2)	Glatzel 21'; Reis (yellow card) 36'; Heyer (yellow card) 79'; Jatta 90'	Report	Hendrix (yellow card) 45'; Karbownik (yellow card) 48'; Kownacki (yellow card) 74'	Stadium: Volksparkstadion; Attendance: 49,616; Referee: Sven Jablonski

30 September 2022 10	Hannover 96	1–2	Hamburger SV	Hanover
18:30 CEST (UTC+2)	Muroya 4'; Börner (yellow card) 33'; Kunze (yellow card) 63'; Köhn (yellow card) 90'	Report	Vušković (yellow card) 11'; Börner 15' (o.g.); Bénes (yellow card) 28'; Kittel (yellow card) 45+3'; Königsdörffer 90+2'	Stadium: Heinz-von-Heiden-Arena; Attendance: 49,000; Referee: Felix Brych

8 October 2022 11	Hamburger SV	1–1	Kaiserslautern	Hamburg
20:30 CET (UTC+1)	Glatzel 24'	Report	Lobinger 82'	Stadium: Volksparkstadion; Attendance: 57,000; Referee: Robert Hartmann (referee)

14 October 2022 12	St Pauli	3–0	Hamburger SV	Hamburg
18:30 CET (UTC+1)	Medic (yellow card) 33'; Smith 61'; Vasilj (yellow card) 70'; Hartel 74'; Saliakas (yellow card) 80'; Otto 89'		Schonlau (red card) 28'; Heuer Fernandes (yellow card) 69'	Stadium: Millerntor-Stadion; Attendance: 29,205; Referee: (Germany) Deniz Aytekin

23 October 2022 13	Hamburger SV	2–3	Magdeburg	Hamburg
13:30 CET (UTC+1)				Stadium: Volksparkstadion; Referee: Harm Osmers

30 October 2022 14	Paderborn	2–3	Hamburger SV	Paderborn
13:30 CET (UTC+1)	Leipertz 3' 51'; Muslija (yellow card) 42'; Rohr (yellow card) 82'	Report	Glatzel 23'; Dompé 45+1'; Bénes 69'	Stadium: Home Deluxe Arena; Attendance: 15,000; Referee: Florian Badstübner

6 November 2022 15	Hamburger SV	3–1	Jahn Regensburg	Hamburg
13:30 CET (UTC+1)	Vušković 12'; Schonlau (yellow card) 43'; Königsdörffer 79'; Glatzel 90'	Report	Caliskaner 7'; Elvedi (yellow card) 20'; Nachreiner (yellow card) 68'; Shipnoski (yellow card) 82'	Stadium: Volksparkstadion; Attendance: 51,314; Referee: Sascha Stegemann

9 November 2022 16	Greuther Fürth	1–0	Hamburger SV	Fürth
18:30 CET (UTC+1)	Sieb 8'; Christiansen (yellow card) 45'; Michalski (yellow card) 49'; Griesbeck (yellow card) 63'; Tillman (red card) 87'; Hrgota (yellow card) 90+6'	Report	Dompé (yellow card) 47'; Kittel (yellow card) 57'; Bénes (yellow card) 63'; Meffert (yellow card) 68'; Daniel Heuer (yellow card) 86'; Amaechi (yellow card) 90+4'	Stadium: Sportpark Ronhof Thomas Sommer; Attendance: 13,266; Referee: Matthias Jöllenbeck

12 November 2022 17	Hamburger SV	4–2	Sandhausen	Hamburg
13:00 CET (UTC+1)	Glatzel 27' 80'; Reis 56'; Zhirov 74' (o.g.); Kittel (yellow card) 88'	Report	Kutucu (yellow card) 18'; Ochs (yellow card) 37'; Soukou 49'; Kinsombi (yellow card) 67' (goal) 68'; Ajdini (yellow card) 90+2'	Stadium: Volksparkstadion; Attendance: 55,246; Referee: Frank Willenborg

29 January 2023 18	Hamburger SV	4–2	Eintracht Braunschweig	Hamburg
13:30 CET (UTC+1)	Glatzel 3' 49'; Heyer 17'; Jatta (yellow card) 50'; Reis 90+2'	Report	Kaufmann 30'; Wiebe 81'	Stadium: Volksparkstadion; Attendance: 56,507; Referee: Robert Hartmann (referee)

5 February 2023 19	Hansa Rostock	0–2	Hamburger SV	Rostock
13:30 CET (UTC+1)	Roßbach (yellow card) 28' (yellow-red card) 81'; Schumacher (yellow card) 36'	Report	Heyer (yellow card) 6'; Reis 40'; Jatta (yellow card) 45+1'; Königsdörffer (yellow card) 56'; Dompé (yellow card) 90'; Németh 90+4'	Stadium: Ostseestadion; Attendance: 26,500; Referee: Tobias Welz

11 February 2023 20	1. FC Heidenheim	3–3	Hamburger SV	Heidenheim an der Brenz
20:30 CET (UTC+1)	Beste 27'; Schöppner 30'; Kleindienst 41'; Pick (yellow card) 45+1'; Siersleben (yellow card) 52'; Müller (yellow card) 89'	Report	Németh 72'; Glatzel 79'; Jatta 88'; Bénes (yellow card) 89'; Muheim (yellow card) 90+1'	Stadium: Voith-Arena; Attendance: 15,000; Referee: Deniz Aytekin

19 February 2023 21	Hamburger SV	2–1	Arminia Bielefeld	Hamburg
13:30 CET (UTC+1)				Stadium: Volksparkstadion; Attendance: 56,905

25 February 2023 22	Darmstadt	1–1	Hamburger SV	Darmstadt
20:30 CET (UTC+1)				Stadium: Stadion am Böllenfalltor; Attendance: 16,800

4 March 2023 23	Hamburger SV	3–0	Nürnberg	Hamburg
13:00 CET (UTC+1)				Stadium: Volksparkstadion; Attendance: 57,000

12 March 2023 24	Karlsruher SC	4–2	Hamburger SV	Karlsruhe
13:30 CET (UTC+1)	Nebel 11'; Jensen 17'; Schleusener 32', 89'	Report	Glatzel 50', 80'	Stadium: Wildparkstadion; Attendance: 23,532; Referee: Sascha Stegemann

18 March 2023 25	Hamburger SV	0–0	Holstein Kiel	Hamburg
13:00 CET (UTC+1)		Report		Stadium: Volksparkstadion; Attendance: 57,000; Referee: Benjamin Brand

31 March 2023 26	Fortuna Düsseldorf	2–2	Hamburger SV	Düsseldorf
18:30 CEST (UTC+2)	Kownacki 21'; Klaus 28'	Report	Bénes 5'; Klarer 75'	Stadium: Merkur Spiel-Arena; Attendance: 51,200; Referee: Robert Schröder

8 April 2023 27	Hamburger SV	6–1	Hannover 96	Hamburg
13:00 CEST (UTC+2)	Kittel 34'; Bénes 41', 61' (pen.); Glatzel 65'; Königsdörffer 76'; Reis 87'	Report	Köhn 52'	Stadium: Volksparkstadion; Attendance: 57,000; Referee: Florian Badstübner

15 April 2023 28	Kaiserslautern	2–0	Hamburger SV	Kaiserslautern
20:30 CEST (UTC+2)	Boyd 71'; Opoku 85'	Report		Stadium: Fritz-Walter-Stadion; Attendance: 49,327; Referee: Frank Willenborg

21 April 2023 29	Hamburger SV	4–3	FC St. Pauli	Hamburg
18:30 CEST (UTC+2)	David (yellow card) 24', (goal) 44'; Heyer (yellow card) 26', (goal) 52'; Schonlau (yellow card) 43'; Jatta 48'; Medić 78' (o.g.); Meffert (yellow card) 85'	Report	Saliakas 36'; Paqarada (yellow card) 48'; Afolayan (yellow card) 55'; Smith (yellow card) 64'; Saad 71'; Irvine 79'	Stadium: Volksparkstadion; Attendance: 56,400; Referee: Sven Jablonski

29 April 2023 30	1. FC Magdeburg	3–2	Hamburger SV	Magdeburg
13:00 CEST (UTC+2)	Kwarteng 32'; Atik 74'; Ito 86'	Report	Kittel 42'; Reis 90+4'	Stadium: MDCC-Arena; Attendance: 27,050; Referee: Harm Osmers

5 May 2023 31	Hamburger SV	2–2	SC Paderborn	Hamburg
18:30 CEST (UTC+2)	Glatzel 39'; Kittel 49'	Report	Justvan 43'; Muslija 73'	Stadium: Volksparkstadion; Attendance: 57,000; Referee: Robin Braun

14 May 2023 32	Jahn Regensburg	1–5	Hamburger SV	Regensburg
13:30 CEST (UTC+2)	Caliskaner 55'	Report	Glatzel 5'; Kittel 17' (pen.), 45+1'; Muheim 30'; Bilbija 81'	Stadium: Jahnstadion Regensburg; Attendance: 15,210; Referee: Alexander Sather

20 May 2023 33	Hamburger SV	2–1	Greuther Fürth	Hamburg
20:30 CEST (UTC+2)	Muheim 27'; Bénes 69'	Report	Petkov 84'	Stadium: Volksparkstadion; Attendance: 56,537; Referee: Sven Waschitzki-Günther

28 May 2023 34	SV Sandhausen	0–1	Hamburger SV	Sandhausen
15:30 CEST (UTC+2)		Report	Dompé 3'	Stadium: BWT-Stadion am Hardtwald; Attendance: 12320; Referee: Florian Badstübner

==== Promotion play-offs ====
1 June 2023 First leg	VfB Stuttgart	3–0	Hamburger SV	Stuttgart
20:45 CEST (UTC+2)	Mavropanos 1'; Guirassy (penalty missed) 26', 54'; Vagnoman 51'; Karazor (yellow card) 76'	Report	Reis (yellow card) 15'; Suhonen (red card) 69'; Königsdörffer (yellow card) 73'	Stadium: Mercedes-Benz Arena; Attendance: 47,500; Referee: Tobias Welz

5 June 2023 Second leg	Hamburger SV	1–3 (1–6 agg.)	VfB Stuttgart	Hamburg
20:45 CEST (UTC+2)	Kittel 6', (yellow card) 65'; Muheim (yellow card) 65'; Bilbija (yellow card) 68'; Mikelbrencis (yellow card) 83'; Schonlau (yellow card) 90+4'	Report	Mavropanos (yellow card) 25'; Millot 48', 64'; Guirassy (yellow card) 58'; Führich (yellow card) 66'; Sosa (yellow card) 66'; Tomás (yellow card) 90+3'; Karazor (yellow card) 90+5'; Silas 90+7'	Stadium: Volksparkstadion; Attendance: 55,500; Referee: Bastian Dankert

=== DFB-Pokal ===
30 July 2022 First round	SpVgg Bayreuth	1–3 (a.e.t.)	Hamburger SV	Bayreuth
15:30 CEST (UTC+2)	Hemmerich 16'	Report	Königsdörffer 83', 111'; Schonlau 97'	Stadium: Hans-Walter-Wild-Stadion; Attendance: 14,700; Referee: Michael Bacher

18 October 2022 Second round	RB Leipzig	4–0	Hamburger SV	Leipzig
18:00 CEST (UTC+2)	Poulsen 33', 36'; Simakan (yellow card) 45+4' (goal) 69'; Raum (yellow card) 71'; Henrichs (yellow card) 39' (goal) 81'	Report	Muheim (yellow card) 15'; Meffert (yellow card) 40'; Bilbija (yellow card) 85'	Stadium: Red Bull Arena; Attendance: 44,787; Referee: Benjamin Cortus
