= Miro Muheim =

Swiss footballer (born 1998)

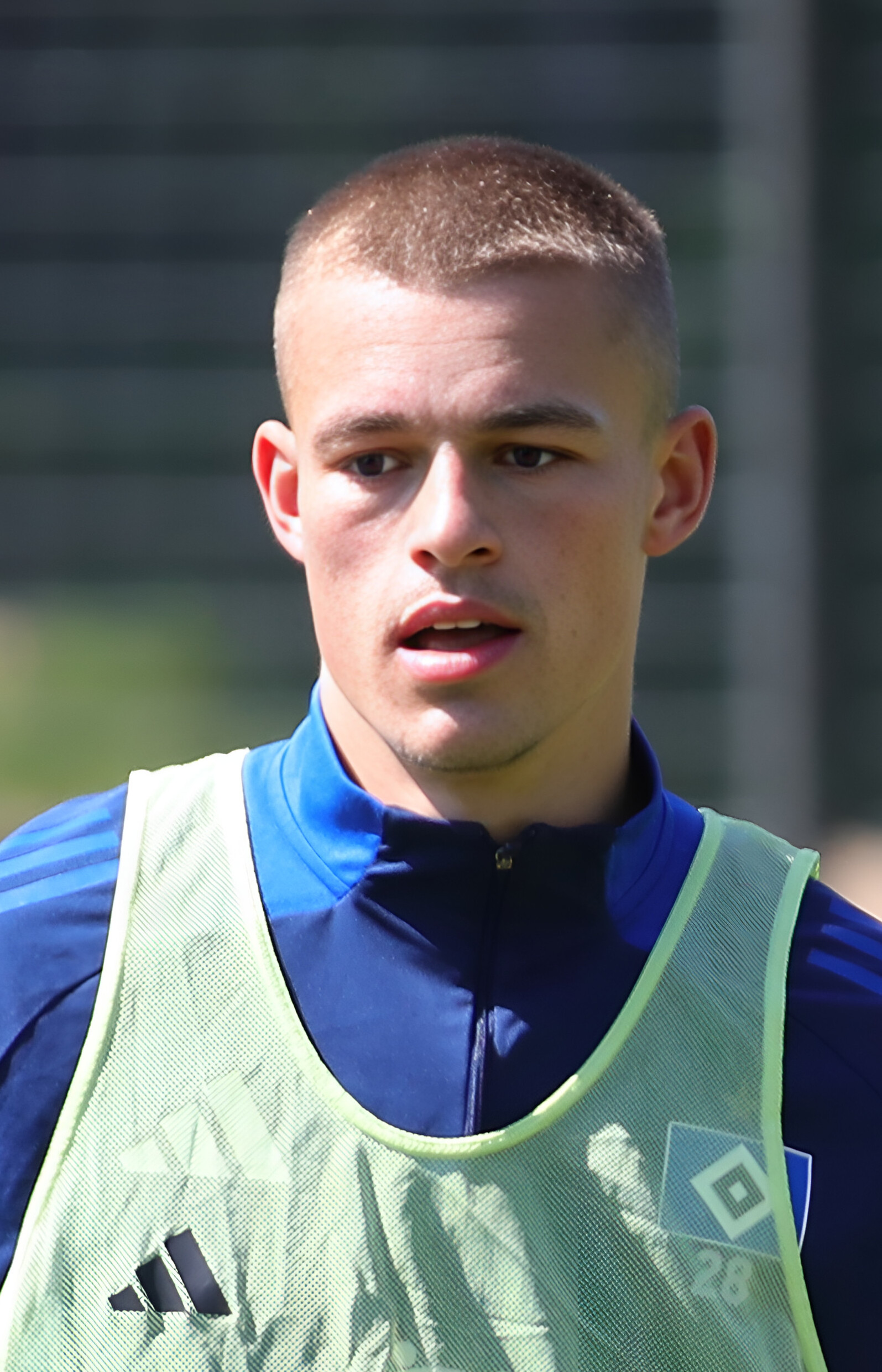
- Muheim training with Hamburger SV in 2025

Personal information
- Full name: Miro Max Maria Muheim
- Date of birth: 24 March 1998 (age 28)
- Place of birth: Zurich, Switzerland
- Height: 1.82 m (6 ft 0 in)
- Position: Midfielder

Team information
- Current team: Hamburger SV
- Number: 28

Youth career
- 2004–2009: Zürich
- 2009: Industrie Turicum
- 2009–2014: Zürich
- 2014–2017: Chelsea

Senior career*
Years	Team	Apps	(Gls)
2017–2018	Chelsea	0	(0)
2017	→ Zürich (loan)	0	(0)
2018–2022	St. Gallen	59	(0)
2021–2022	→ Hamburger SV (loan)	21	(1)
2022–	Hamburger SV	124	(10)

International career^{‡}
2013	Switzerland U15	2	(0)
2014	Switzerland U16	2	(1)
2015	Switzerland U17	1	(0)
2016	Switzerland U18	1	(0)
2016–2017	Switzerland U19	7	(2)
2020–2021	Switzerland U21	5	(0)
2024–	Switzerland	13	(0)
- * Club domestic league appearances and goals as of 1 November 2026 ‡ National team caps and goals as of 12 July 2026

Miro Max Maria Muheim (born 24 March 1998) is a Swiss professional footballer who plays as a midfielder for Bundesliga club Hamburger SV and the Switzerland national team.

== Club career ==
After a ten-year spell with Zürich, Muheim joined English club Chelsea in July 2014, and was integrated into the club's academy setup. Muheim went onto enjoy an impressive debut season, netting eleven times in nineteen games during the under-18 campaign and made his under-21 debut a year later. However, during the 2016–17 campaign, Muheim became a bit-player and therefore returned to his boyhood club Zürich on loan for the remainder of the campaign; however, he did not make a senior first team appearance during his time back at Zürich, spending his time with the club's second team in the Swiss Promotion League, and returned to Chelsea in June 2017.

On 31 January 2018, Muheim returned to Switzerland to join Swiss Super League club St. Gallen on a permanent basis. Four days later, he made his professional debut during St. Gallen's 2–0 away defeat against Young Boys, replacing Silvan Gönitzer§ in the 80th minute.

On 15 June 2021, it was announced that Muheim would join 2. Bundesliga side, Hamburger SV on a season-long loan. He went onto feature 27 times, scoring once, before making the deal permanent in March 2022.

== International career ==
Muheim has represented Switzerland ranging from under-15 to under-21 levels. On 18 November 2024, he debuted for the Swiss senior squad in a Nations League 3–2 defeat against Spain at Estadio Heliodoro Rodríguez López, playing the full match.

On 20 May 2026, Muheim was selected in the 26-man squad for the 2026 FIFA World Cup. On 13 June, in the 94th minute of their World Cup opener against Qatar, under pressure from Boualem Khoukhi, a left-footed cross rebounded off of Muheim's head into the Swiss net, leveling the game at 1–1 and earning Qatar's first ever point at the World Cup. While the goalscorer was named to be Khoukhi in the stadium, later reports corrected it to Muheim. The goal was the fourth-latest regulation-time equalizer ever scored at a World Cup.

== Career statistics ==
=== Club ===
As of match played 1 November 2026

Appearances and goals by club, season and competition
Club	Season	League			National cup (Note: Includes Swiss Cup, DFB-Pokal)		Europe		Other		Total	
Club	Season	Division	Apps	Goals	Apps	Goals	Apps	Goals	Apps	Goals	Apps	Goals
Chelsea U23	2016–17	—			—		—		0	0	0	0
Chelsea U23	2017–18	—			—		—		2 (Note: Appearances in EFL Trophy)	0	2	0
Chelsea U23	Total		—		—		—		2	0	2	0
Chelsea	2016–17	Premier League	0	0	0	0	—		—		0	0
Zürich (loan)	2016–17	Swiss Challenge League	0	0	0	0	—		—		0	0
St. Gallen	2017–18	Swiss Super League	1	0	0	0	—		—		1	0
St. Gallen	2018–19	Swiss Super League	1	0	0	0	—		—		1	0
St. Gallen	2019–20	Swiss Super League	33	0	1	0	—		—		34	0
St. Gallen	2020–21	Swiss Super League	24	0	4	0	1 (Note: Appearance in UEFA Europa League)	0	—		29	0
St. Gallen	Total		59	0	5	0	1	0	—		65	0
Hamburger SV (loan)	2021–22	2. Bundesliga	21	1	4	0	—		2 (Note: Appearances in 2. Bundesliga promotion play-offs)	0	27	1
Hamburger SV	2022–23	2. Bundesliga	33	2	2	0	—		2	0	37	2
Hamburger SV	2023–24	2. Bundesliga	28	5	3	0	—		—		31	5
Hamburger SV	2024–25	2. Bundesliga	30	1	2	1	—		—		32	2
Hamburger SV	2025–26	Bundesliga	29	0	3	0	—		—		32	0
Hamburger SV	2026–27	Bundesliga	4	2	1	0	—		—		5	2
Hamburger SV	Total		124	10	11	1	—		2	0	137	11
Career total			204	10	20	1	1	0	6	0	231	11

=== International ===
As of match played 11 July 2026

Appearances and goals by national team and year
National team	Year	Apps	Goals
Switzerland	2024	1	0
Switzerland	2025	5	0
Switzerland	2026	7	0
Total		13	0
