= Łukasz Poręba =

Polish footballer (born 2000)

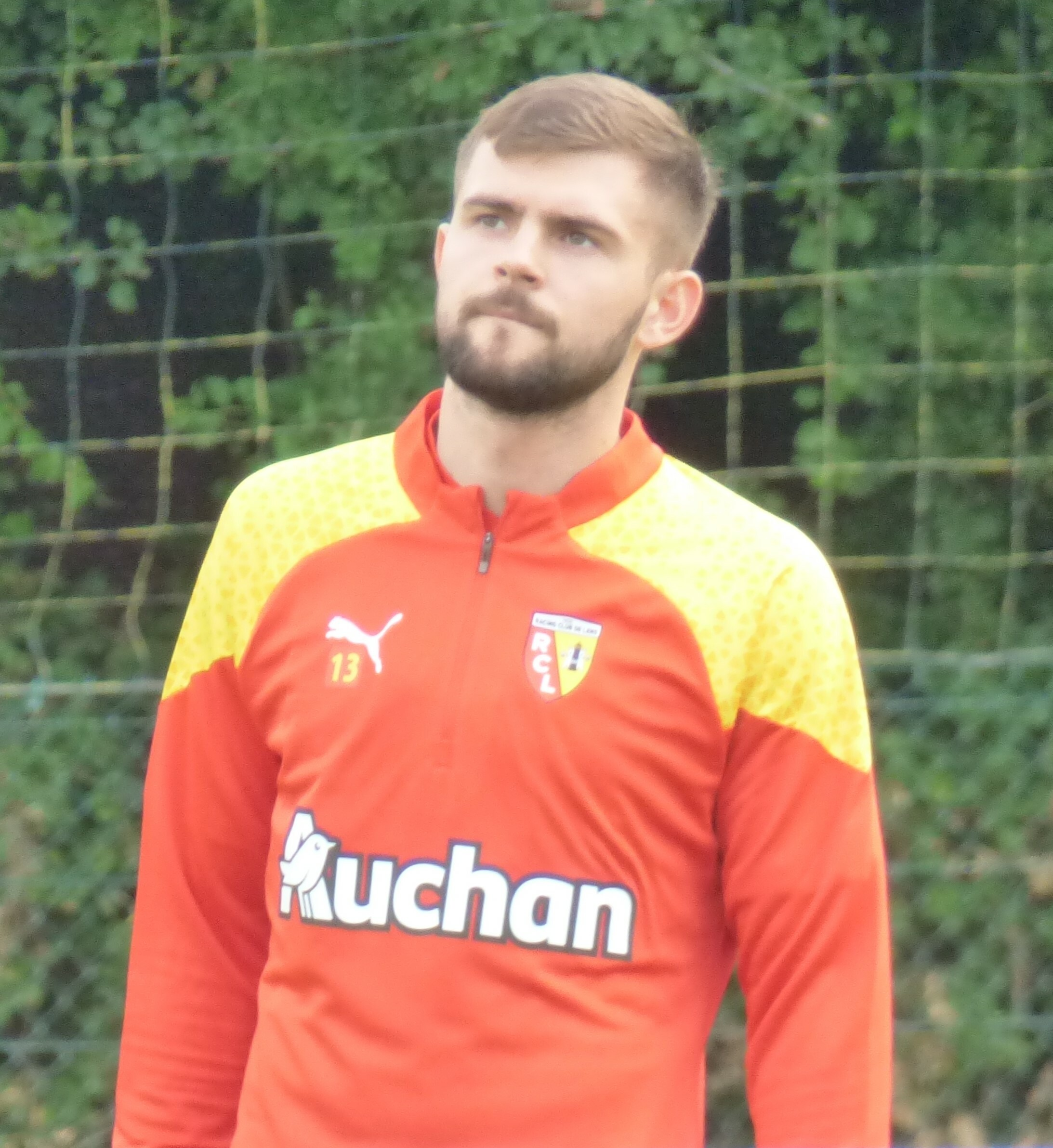
- Poręba with Lens in 2023

Personal information
- Date of birth: 13 March 2000 (age 26)
- Place of birth: Legnica, Poland
- Height: 1.79 m (5 ft 10 in)
- Position: Midfielder

Team information
- Current team: SV Elversberg
- Number: 8

Youth career
- –2018: Zagłębie Lubin

Senior career*
Years	Team	Apps	(Gls)
2018–2022	Zagłębie Lubin	88	(4)
2022–2024	Lens	10	(0)
2023–2024	→ Hamburger SV (loan)	17	(2)
2024–2026	Hamburger SV	17	(1)
2025–2026	→ SV Elversberg (loan)	34	(1)
2026–	SV Elversberg	9	(0)

International career^{‡}
2018–2019	Poland U19	5	(0)
2019	Poland U20	6	(2)
2021–2022	Poland U21	10	(1)
2026–	Poland	1	(0)
- * Club domestic league appearances and goals as of 13:44, 10 November 2026 (UTC) ‡ National team caps and goals as of 17 November 2026

Łukasz Poręba (born 13 March 2000) is a Polish professional footballer who plays as a midfielder for Bundesliga club SV Elversberg and the Poland national team.

== Club career ==
=== Zagłębie Lubin ===
Poręba started his professional career at Zagłębie Lubin in 2018, he made 88 appearances in four seasons.

=== Lens ===
On 1 July 2022, Poręba joined French side Lens on a free transfer, signing a five-year contract. He made his first appearance with Lens in a friendly game against Rodez later that month. On 31 August 2023, he delivered an assist in his first Ligue 1 game against Lorient.

=== Hamburger SV ===
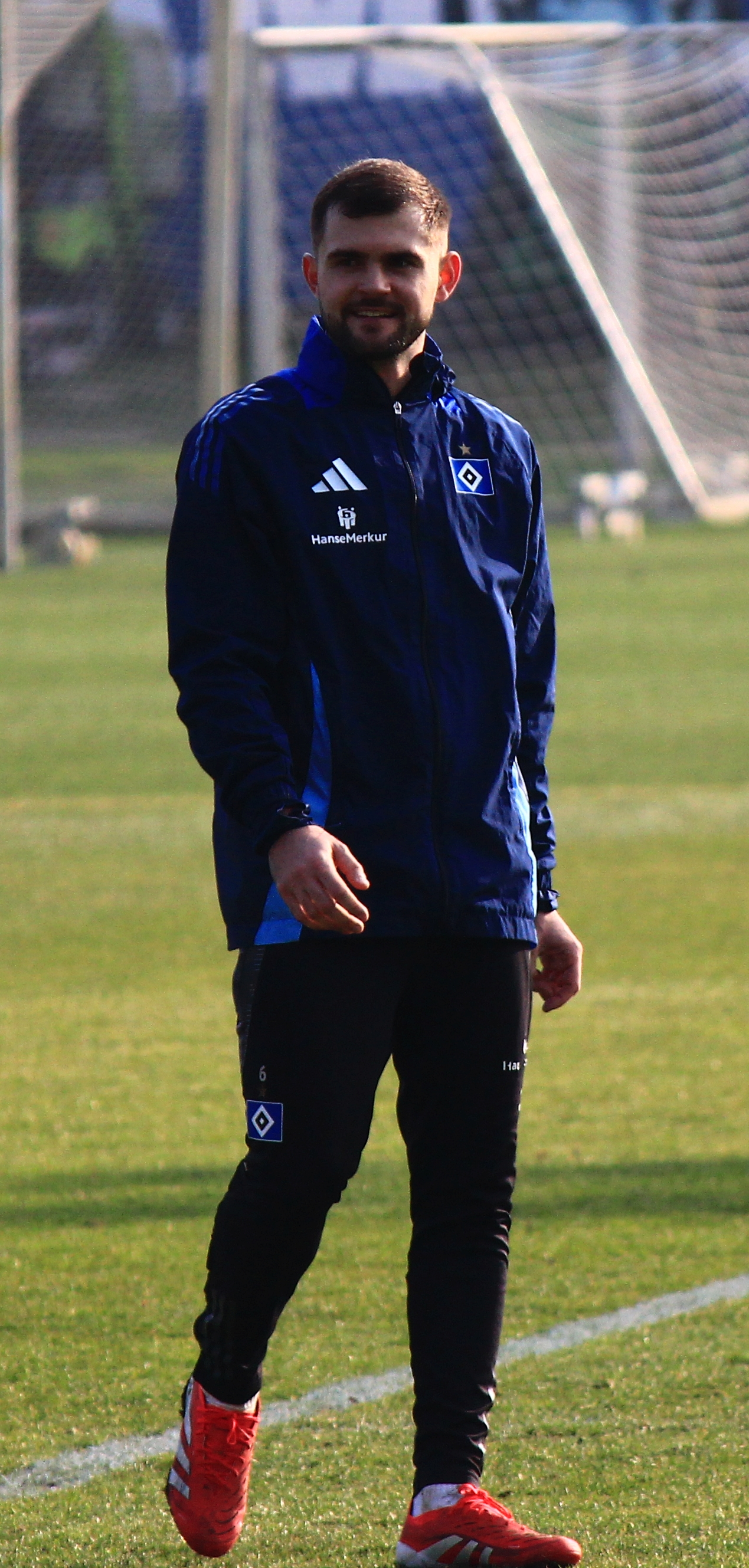
Poręba with Hamburger SV in 2025

On 30 August 2023, Poręba was sent on a season-long loan to German side Hamburger SV, with an option to make the move permanent.

On 21 May 2024, HSV opted to activate the buy option, with Poręba set to join the club on a permanent basis in July later that year.

=== SV Elversberg ===
On 30 July 2025, Poręba moved on loan to SV Elversberg in the 2. Bundesliga, with an option to buy. Poręba played in all 34 league games and scored one goal. Elversberg finished second in the league and were promoted to the Bundesliga. His move to Elversberg was made permanent on 6 June 2026 with a contract to 30 July 2029.

== International career ==
Poręba has represented Poland at under-19, under-20 and under-21 levels. In November 2026, he was named to the Poland senior team by head coach Jan Urban for the UEFA Nations League games against Romania and Sweden. He would make his debut against the latter on 18 November in a 1–1 home draw.

== Career statistics ==
As of match played 7 November 2026

Appearances and goals by club, season and competition
Club	Season	League			National cup (Note: Includes Polish Cup, Coupe de France, DFB-Pokal)		Europe		Other		Total	
Club	Season	Division	Apps	Goals	Apps	Goals	Apps	Goals	Apps	Goals	Apps	Goals
Zagłębie Lubin	2018–19	Ekstraklasa	7	1	1	0	—		—		8	1
Zagłębie Lubin	2019–20	Ekstraklasa	28	2	3	0	—		—		31	2
Zagłębie Lubin	2020–21	Ekstraklasa	24	0	3	0	—		—		27	0
Zagłębie Lubin	2021–22	Ekstraklasa	29	1	3	0	—		—		32	1
Zagłębie Lubin	Total		88	4	10	0	—		—		98	4
Lens B	2022–23	National 3	1	0	—		—		—		1	0
Lens	2022–23	Ligue 1	10	0	2	0	—		—		12	0
Hamburger SV (loan)	2023–24	2. Bundesliga	17	2	1	0	—		—		18	2
Hamburger SV	2024–25	2. Bundesliga	17	1	2	0	—		—		19	1
Hamburger SV	Hamburger SV total		34	3	3	0	—		—		37	3
SV Elversberg (loan)	2025–26	2. Bundesliga	34	1	2	0	—		—		36	1
SV Elversberg	2026–27	Bundesliga	9	0	2	0	—		—		11	0
SV Elversberg	SV Elversberg total		43	1	4	0	—		—		47	1
Career total			176	8	19	0	0	0	0	0	195	8

=== International ===
As of match played 17 November 2026

Appearances and goals by national team and year
National team	Year	Apps	Goals
Poland	2026	1	0
Total		1	0

== Honours ==
Zagłębie Lubin II

- IV liga Lower Silesia West: 2016–17
