= William Mikelbrencis =

French footballer (born 2004)

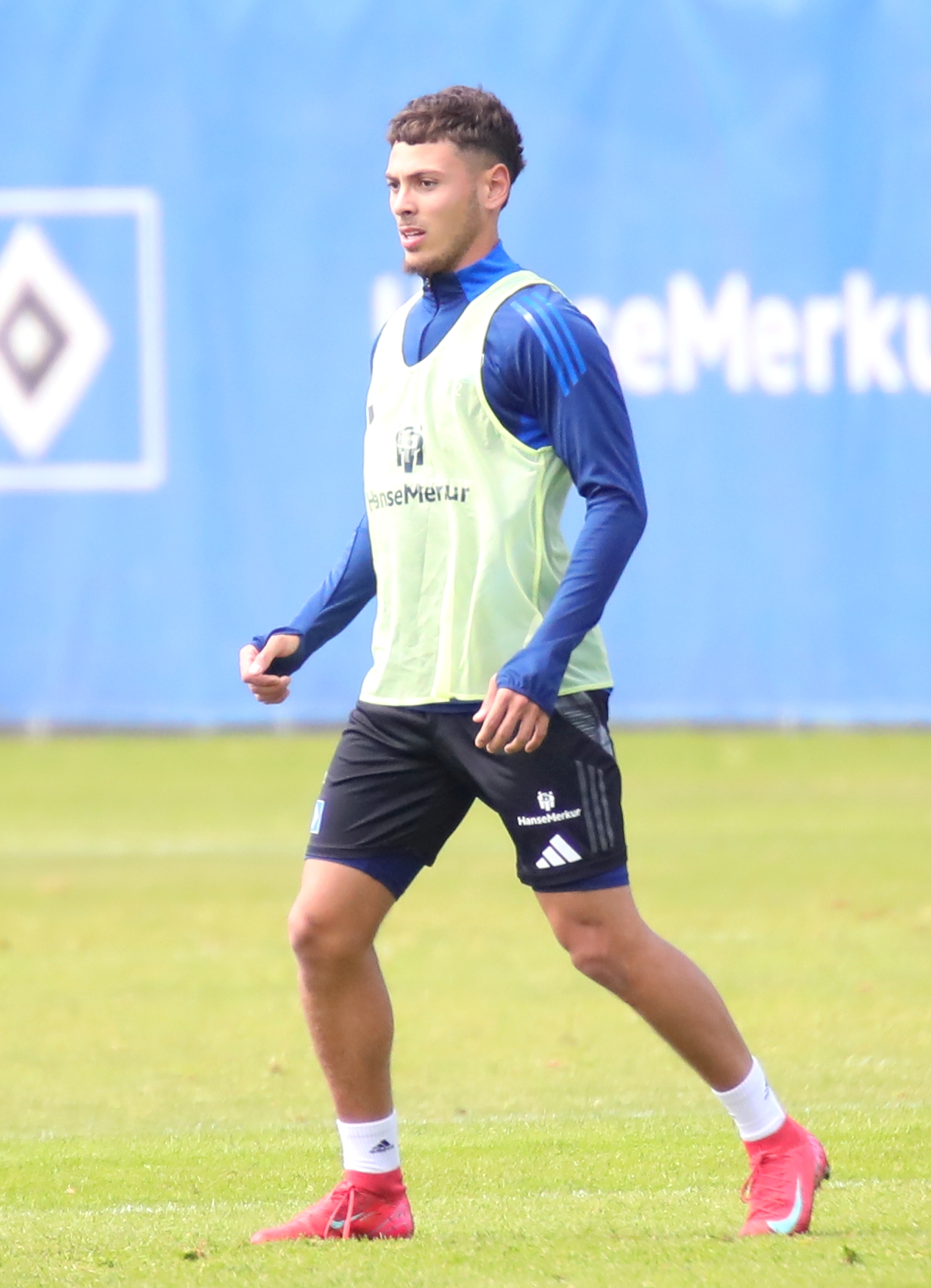
- Mikelbrencis with Hamburger SV in 2025

Personal information
- Date of birth: 25 February 2004 (age 22)
- Place of birth: Forbach, France
- Height: 1.76 m (5 ft 9 in)
- Position: Right-back

Team information
- Current team: Darmstadt 98
- Number: 25

Youth career
- 2010–2015: AS Montbronn
- 2015–2021: Metz

Senior career*
Years	Team	Apps	(Gls)
2021–2022	Metz B	15	(1)
2021–2022	Metz	14	(1)
2022–2026	Hamburger SV	63	(0)
2023–2024	Hamburger SV II	11	(1)
2026–	Darmstadt 98	0	(0)

International career
2019–2020	France U16	4	(0)
2021–2022	France U18	8	(0)
2022	France U19	2	(0)
2023–2024	France U20	7	(0)
- * Club domestic league appearances and goals as of 30 August 2026

William Mikelbrencis (born 25 February 2004) is a French professional footballer who plays as a right-back for 2. Bundesliga club Darmstadt 98.

== Early life ==
Born in Forbach, Lorraine, William Mikelbrencis started playing football in the nearby Montbronn, before joining the FC Metz academy in 2015.

== Club career ==
Having made his first training sessions with the Ligue 1 squad, Mikelbrencis signed his first professional contract with the club from Metz in April 2021. He started the following season playing with the reserve team in National 2, scoring his first goal on 6 November, against Sainte-Geneviève.

Having played his first senior game in early January 2022—delivering an assist during a 1–0 home friendly win against CS Sedan Ardennes—he made his professional debut for Metz on 9 January, starting the Ligue 1 game against Strasbourg as right-back in a 3-4-3 formation.

In a difficult context between the injuries and the players away for the AFCON 2021, he made a first good impression despite his team losing 2–0 at home (his team was only losing by a goal when he was subbed for Pape Ndiaga Yade).

On 31 August 2022, Mikelbrencis signed a four-year contract with Hamburger SV in Germany.

== International career ==
A youth international for France since he played for the under-16 in 2019, he was later selected for the under-17—only playing friendlies during the COVID pandemic—before becoming a member of the under-18 in 2021, delivering his first assist during a 3–0 friendly away win against Italy.

== Career statistics ==
=== Club ===
As of 16 May 2026

Appearances and goals by club, season and competition
Club	Season	League			Cup		Other (Note: Includes Bundesliga relegation play-offs)		Total	
Club	Season	Division	Apps	Goals	Apps	Goals	Apps	Goals	Apps	Goals
Metz II	2021–22	National 2	15	1	—		—		15	1
Metz	2021–22	Ligue 1	9	0	0	0	—		9	0
Metz	2022–23	Ligue 2	5	1	0	0	—		5	1
Metz	Total		29	2	0	0	0	0	29	2
Hamburger SV	2022–23	2. Bundesliga	6	0	1	0	1	0	8	0
Hamburger SV	2023–24	2. Bundesliga	6	0	2	0	—		8	0
Hamburger SV	2024–25	2. Bundesliga	25	0	1	0	—		26	0
Hamburger SV	2025–26	Bundesliga	25	0	0	0	—		25	0
Hamburger SV	Total		61	0	4	0	1	0	66	0
Hamburger SV II	2023–24	Regionalliga	6	0	—		—		6	0
Hamburger SV II	2024–25	Regionalliga	5	1	—		—		5	1
Hamburger SV II	Total		11	1	0	0	0	0	11	1
Career total			101	3	4	0	1	0	106	3
