= Ignace Van Der Brempt =

Belgian footballer (born 2002)

Ignace van der Brempt
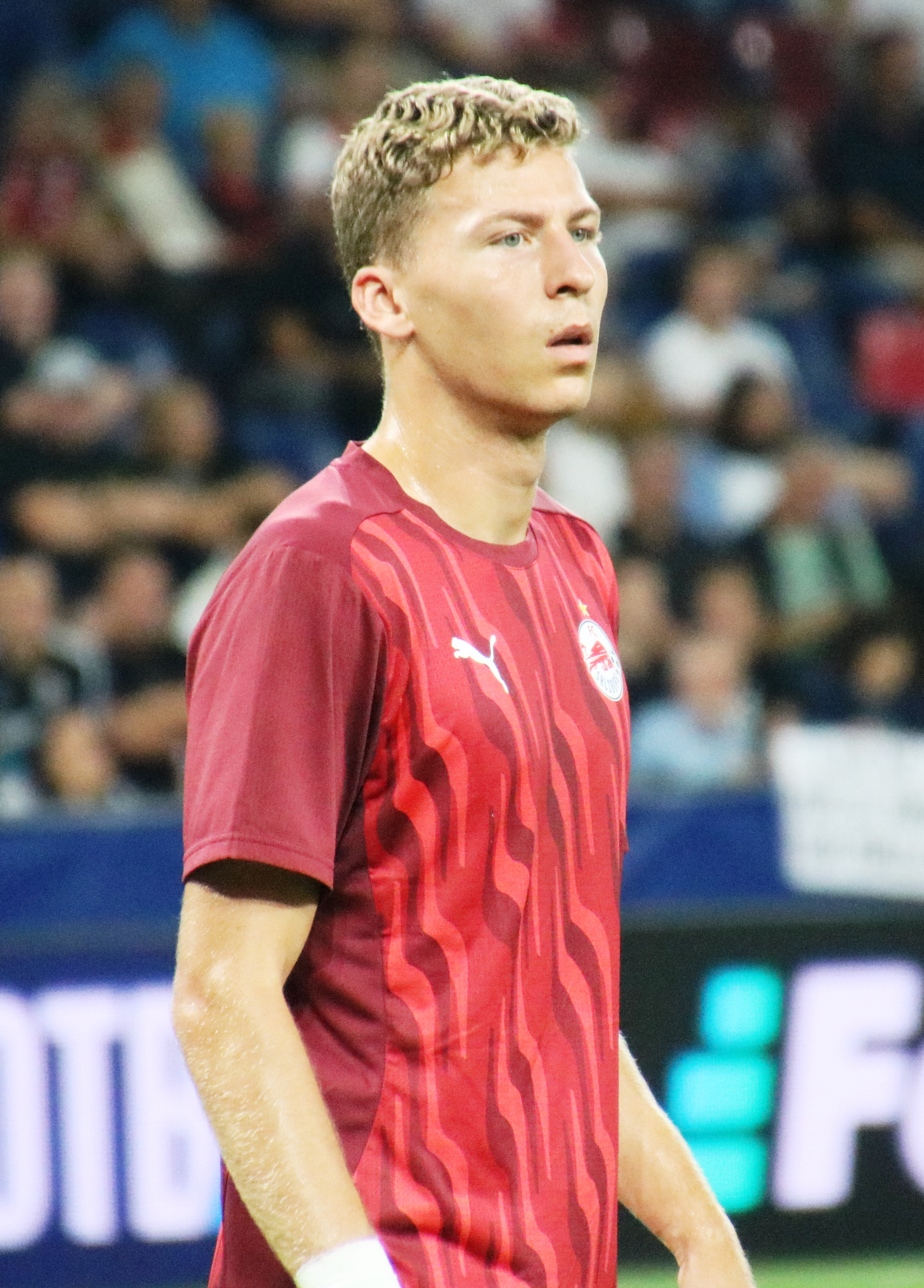
- Van der Brempt with Red Bull Salzburg in 2024

Personal information
- Date of birth: 1 April 2002 (age 24)
- Place of birth: Antwerp, Belgium
- Height: 1.87 m (6 ft 2 in)
- Positions: Right-back; right wing-back

Team information
- Current team: Sassuolo (on loan from Como)
- Number: 20

Youth career
- Schelle Sport
- Beerschot AC
- Rupel Boom
- 2014–2017: Mechelen
- 2017–2019: Club Brugge

Senior career*
Years	Team	Apps	(Gls)
2019–2022	Club Brugge	22	(1)
2022–2025	Red Bull Salzburg	22	(0)
2023–2024	→ Hamburger SV (loan)	23	(0)
2024–2025	→ Como (loan)	19	(0)
2025–	Como	20	(0)
2026–	→ Sassuolo (loan)	0	(0)

International career^{‡}
2017	Belgium U15	3	(1)
2017	Belgium U16	4	(0)
2019	Belgium U19	5	(1)
2022	Belgium U20	1	(0)
2021–2023	Belgium U21	15	(1)
- * Club domestic league appearances and goals as of 08:24, 19 June 2026 (UTC) ‡ National team caps and goals as of 21:03, 28 October 2023 (UTC)

Ignace van der Brempt (born 1 April 2002) is a Belgian professional footballer who plays as a right-back for Serie A club Sassuolo, on loan from Como.

== Club career ==
=== Club Brugge ===
Van der Brempt made his Belgian First Division A debut for Club Brugge on 14 September 2019 in a game against Cercle Brugge.

=== Red Bull Salzburg ===
In February 2022 he moved to Red Bull Salzburg in the Austrian Bundesliga. He signed a contract until June 2026.

==== Loan to Hamburger SV ====
On 18 July 2023, Van der Brempt moved on a season-long loan to Hamburger SV in the 2. Bundesliga.

=== Como ===
On 30 August 2024, Van der Brempt joined newly promoted Serie A club Como in Italy, on a season-long loan with an obligation to buy. Como made his move permanent on 28 April 2025.

==== Loan to Sassuolo ====
On 30 August 2026, Van Der Brempt joined Sassuolo on loan with a conditional obligation to buy for €6.5 million

== Career statistics ==
As of match played 24 May 2026

Appearances and goals by club, season and competition
Club	Season	League			Cup		Europe		Other		Total	
Club	Season	Division	Apps	Goals	Apps	Goals	Apps	Goals	Apps	Goals	Apps	Goals
Club Brugge	2019–20	Belgian Pro League	1	0	1	0	0	0	—		2	0
Club Brugge	2020–21	Belgian Pro League	9	1	2	0	3 (Note: One appearance in UEFA Champions League, two appearances in UEFA Europa League)	0	—		14	1
Club Brugge	2021–22	Belgian Pro League	12	0	2	0	5 (Note: Appearances in UEFA Champions League)	0	1 (Note: Appearance in Belgian Super Cup)	0	18	0
Club Brugge	Total		22	1	5	0	8	0	1	0	34	1
Red Bull Salzburg	2021–22	Austrian Bundesliga	6	0	0	0	0	0	0	0	6	0
Red Bull Salzburg	2022–23	Austrian Bundesliga	15	0	2	1	1 (Note: Appearances in UEFA Europa League)	0	—		18	1
Red Bull Salzburg	2024–25	Austrian Bundesliga	1	0	0	0	3 (Note: Appearances in UEFA Champions League)	0	0	0	4	0
Red Bull Salzburg	Total		22	0	2	1	4	0	0	0	28	1
Hamburger SV (loan)	2023–24	2. Bundesliga	23	0	1	0	—		—		24	0
Como (loan)	2024–25	Serie A	19	0	0	0	—		—		19	0
Como	2025–26	Serie A	20	0	3	0	—		—		23	0
Como	Como total		39	0	3	0	0	0	0	0	42	0
Sassuolo (loan)	2026–27	Serie A	0	0	0	0	—		—		0	0
Career total			106	1	11	1	12	0	1	0	128	2

== Honours ==
Club Brugge

- Belgian Pro League: 2019–20, 2020–21
- Belgian Super Cup: 2021

Red Bull Salzburg

- Austrian Bundesliga: 2021–22
- Austrian Cup: 2021–22
