= Guilherme Ramos =

Portuguese footballer (born 1997)

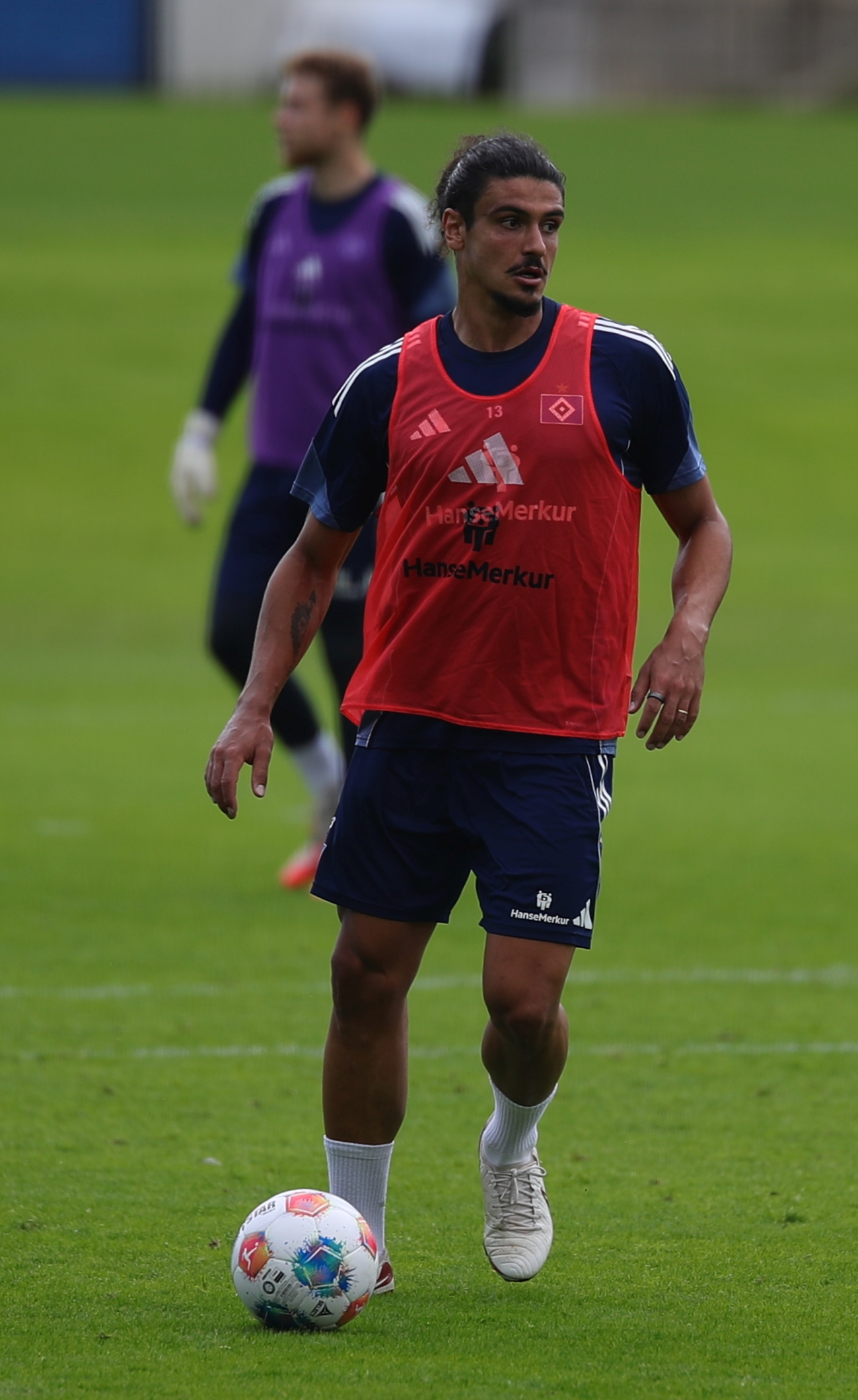
- Ramos training with Hamburger SV in 2025

Personal information
- Full name: Guilherme Magro Pires Ramos
- Date of birth: 11 August 1997 (age 29)
- Place of birth: Lisbon, Portugal
- Height: 1.91 m (6 ft 3 in)
- Position: Centre-back

Team information
- Current team: Beijing Guoan
- Number: 5

Youth career
- 2006–2012: Linda-a-Velha
- 2012–2016: Sporting CP

Senior career*
Years	Team	Apps	(Gls)
2015–2019	Sporting CP B	10	(0)
2018–2019	→ Mafra (loan)	19	(1)
2019–2021	Feirense	45	(4)
2021–2023	Arminia Bielefeld	36	(1)
2023–2026	Hamburger SV	31	(1)
2024–2025	→ Santa Clara (loan)	6	(0)
2025	Hamburger SV II	1	(0)
2026–	Beijing Guoan	28	(3)
- * Club domestic league appearances and goals as of 8 November 2026

Guilherme Magro Pires Ramos (born 11 August 1997) is a Portuguese professional footballer who plays as a centre-back for Chinese Super League club Beijing Guoan.

== Career ==
On 6 August 2016, Ramos made his professional debut with Sporting B in a 2016–17 LigaPro match against Portimonense.

On 30 June 2021, Guilherme signed a contract with Arminia Bielefeld.

After two seasons at Arminia Bielefeld, Guilherme moved to Hamburger SV on a contract until 2026.

On 2 September 2024, Ramos was loaned to Santa Clara.. He returned to Hamburg ahead of the next season, following the Northerners' promotion back to the Bundesliga.

On 31 January 2026, Ramos moved to Chinese Super League club Beijing Guoan.

== Career statistics ==
As of match played 8 November 2026

Appearances and goals by club, season and competition
Club	Season	League			Cup		League cup		Continental		Other		Total	
Club	Season	Division	Apps	Goals	Apps	Goals	Apps	Goals	Apps	Goals	Apps	Goals	Apps	Goals
Sporting CP B	2016–17	Liga Portugal 2	5	0	—		—		—		—		5	0
Sporting CP B	2017–18	Liga Portugal 2	5	0	—		—		—		—		5	0
Sporting CP B	Total		10	0	—		—		—		—		10	0
Mafra (loan)	2018–19	Liga Portugal 2	19	1	0	0	0	0	—		—		19	1
Feirense	2019–20	Liga Portugal 2	15	2	0	0	1	0	—		—		16	2
Feirense	2020–21	Liga Portugal 2	30	2	1	0	0	0	—		—		31	2
Feirense	Total		45	4	1	0	1	0	—		—		47	4
Arminia Bielefeld	2021–22	Bundesliga	13	0	2	0	—		—		—		15	0
Arminia Bielefeld	2022–23	2. Bundesliga	23	1	2	0	—		—		0	0	25	1
Arminia Bielefeld	Total		36	1	4	0	—		—		0	0	40	1
Hamburger SV	2023–24	2. Bundesliga	22	1	3	0	—		—		—		25	1
Hamburger SV	2024–25	2. Bundesliga	1	0	0	0	—		—		—		1	0
Hamburger SV	2025–26	Bundesliga	8	0	2	0	—		—		—		10	0
Hamburger SV	Total		31	1	5	0	—		—		—		36	1
Santa Clara (loan)	2024–25	Primeira Liga	6	0	3	0	1	0	—		—		10	0
Beijing Guoan	2026	Chinese Super League	28	3	1	0	—		4	0	1	0	34	3
Career total			175	10	14	0	2	0	4	0	1	0	196	10

== Honours ==
Beijing Guoan

- Chinese FA Super Cup: 2026
