= Miguel Reichmuth =

Swiss footballer (born 2003

Personal information
- Full name: Miguel Raffael Reichmuth
- Date of birth: 26 October 2003 (age 23)
- Place of birth: Zug, Switzerland
- Height: 1.71 m (5 ft 7 in)
- Position: Midfielder

Team information
- Current team: FC Zürich
- Number: 38

Youth career
- –2016: FC Ibach
- 2016–2022: FC Zürich

Senior career*
Years	Team	Apps	(Gls)
2022–2025	FC Zürich II	87	(12)
2025–	FC Zürich	39	(1)

International career^{‡}
2017–2018	Switzerland U15	6	(1)
2018–2019	Switzerland U16	7	(1)
2019	Switzerland U17	4	(0)
2021	Switzerland U19	6	(0)
2022–2023	Switzerland U20	3	(0)
- * Club domestic league appearances and goals as of 28 September 2026 ‡ National team caps and goals as of 28 March 2023

Miguel Raffael Reichmuth (born 26 October 2003) is a Swiss professional footballer who plays as a midfielder for FC Zürich.

== Early life ==
Reichmuth was born on 20 October 2003 in Zug, Switzerland and is a native of Ibach, Switzerland. Of Chilean descent through his mother, he is the younger brother of Swiss footballer Nils Reichmuth.

== Club career ==
As a youth player, Reichmuth joined the youth academy of FC Ibach. In 2016, he joined the youth academy of FC Zürich and was promoted to the club's reserve team in 2022. Three years later, he was promoted to their senior team. On 19 August 2023, he debuted for them during a 2–0 away win over FC Red Star Zürich in the Swiss Cup.

== International career ==
Reichmuth is a Switzerland youth international. During October 2019, he played for the Switzerland national under-17 football team for 2017 UEFA European Under-17 Championship qualification.
