= Omar Megeed =

Egyptian footballer (born 2005)

Personal information
- Full name: Omar Abdel Megeed
- Date of birth: 19 August 2005 (age 21)
- Place of birth: Hamburg, Germany
- Height: 1.88 m (6 ft 2 in)
- Position: Attacking midfielder

Team information
- Current team: Greuther Fürth
- Number: 18

Youth career
- 2012–2019: ESV Einigkeit Wilhelmsburg
- 2019: FC Süderelbe
- 2019–2024: Hamburger SV

Senior career*
| Years | Team | Apps | (Gls) |
| 2022–2026 | Hamburger SV II | 69 | (3) |
| 2022–2026 | Hamburger SV | 2 | (0) |
| 2026– | Greuther Fürth | 0 | (0) |

International career
| 2022 | Egypt U20 | 2 | (0) |
- * Club domestic league appearances and goals as of 1 July 2026

Omar Abdel Megeed (Arabic: عمر عبد المجيد; born 19 August 2005) is a professional footballer who plays as an attacking midfielder for 2. Bundesliga club Greuther Fürth. Born in Germany, he represents Egypt at international level.

== Club career ==
Megeed is a youth academy graduate of Hamburger SV. He made his professional debut for the club on 13 August 2022 in a 2–0 league win against Arminia Bielefeld. This made him the youngest player to appear in an official match for the club, a record which was previously held by Josha Vagnoman.

== International career ==
Born in Germany to Egyptian parents, Megeed represents Egypt at youth international level. In March 2022, he received his first call-up to the Egypt under-20 team. He made his debut for the team on 24 March in a 1–0 friendly match defeat against Slovakia.

== Career statistics ==
As of match played 13 August 2022

Appearances and goals by club, season and competition
| Club | Season | League | | | Cup | | Continental | | Total | |
| Club | Season | Division | Apps | Goals | Apps | Goals | Apps | Goals | Apps | Goals |
|---|---|---|---|---|---|---|---|---|---|---|
| Hamburger SV | 2022–23 | 2. Bundesliga | 1 | 0 | 0 | 0 | 0 | 0 | 1 | 0 |
| Career total | | | 1 | 0 | 0 | 0 | 0 | 0 | 1 | 0 |
