= Daouda Beleme =

Burkinabe footballer (born 2001)

Personal information
- Full name: Pingdwendé Daouda Beleme
- Date of birth: 5 January 2001 (age 25)
- Place of birth: Hamburg, Germany
- Height: 1.87 m (6 ft 2 in)
- Position: Striker

Team information
- Current team: VfB Lübeck
- Number: 21

Senior career*
Years	Team	Apps	(Gls)
2019–2021	FC St. Pauli II	10	(2)
2021–	Hamburger SV II	68	(31)
2023–2025	Hamburger SV	0	(0)
2023–2024	→ FC Ingolstadt 04 (loan)	19	(0)
2024	→ VfB Lübeck (loan)	14	(2)
2025	→ Alemannia Aachen (loan)	9	(1)
2025–2026	Al Jazirah Al-Hamra		
2026–	VfB Lübeck	5	(1)

International career
2021	Burkina Faso U20	4	(1)
2022	Burkina Faso U23	2	(0)
- * Club domestic league appearances and goals as of 22 September 2026

Pingdwendé Daouda Beleme (born 5 January 2001) is a footballer who plays as a striker for VfB Lübeck. Born in Germany, he is a Burkina Faso youth international.

== Early life ==
Beleme studied to become a physiotherapist. He also worked at a retirement home.

== Club career ==
Beleme started his career with German side FC St. Pauli II. In 2021, he signed for German side Hamburger SV II. He helped the club achieve second place in the 2022–23 Regionalliga. In 2023, he was sent on loan to German side FC Ingolstadt 04. He was regarded to have performed poorly while playing for the club. In 2024, he was sent on loan to German side VfB Lübeck.

On 11 August 2025, Beleme was loaned by Al Jazirah Al-Hamra.

== International career ==
Beleme has represented Burkina Faso internationally at youth level. He played for the Burkina Faso national under-20 football team at the 2021 U-20 Africa Cup of Nations.

== Style of play ==
Beleme mainly operates as a striker. He is known for his speed.

== Personal life ==
Beleme is a native of Hamburg, Germany.
