= Elijah Krahn =

German footballer (born 2003)

Personal information
- Full name: Elijah Akwasi Krahn
- Date of birth: 24 August 2003 (age 23)
- Place of birth: Hamburg, Germany
- Height: 1.84 m (6 ft 0 in)
- Position: Defensive midfielder

Youth career
- –2015: Concordia
- 2015–2021: Hamburger SV

Senior career*
Years	Team	Apps	(Gls)
2021–2024	Hamburger SV II	21	(1)
2021–2024	Hamburger SV	8	(0)
2024–2026	1. FC Saarbrücken	60	(2)

International career^{‡}
2019	Germany U16	3	(0)
2019	Germany U17	3	(0)
- * Club domestic league appearances and goals as of 30 May 2026 ‡ National team caps and goals as of 6 February 2022

Elijah Akwasi Krahn (born 24 August 2003) is a German professional footballer who plays as a defensive midfielder.

== Club career ==
Krahn made his professional debut for Hamburger SV on the 6 February 2022, replacing David Kinsombi during a 5–0 away 2. Bundesliga win against Darmstadt 98, delivering an assist to Robert Glatzel in the last goal of the game.

On 24 June 2024, Krahn signed with 1. FC Saarbrücken in 3. Liga.

== International career ==
Born in Germany, Krahn is of Ghanaian descent. He is a youth international for Germany, having played up to the Germany U17s.
