= Valon Zumberi =

Kosovan footballer (born 2002)

Personal information
- Date of birth: 24 November 2002 (age 23)
- Place of birth: Hamburg, Germany
- Height: 1.88 m (6 ft 2 in)
- Position: Centre-back

Team information
- Current team: Vitesse
- Number: 17

Youth career
- –2010: Norderstedter SV
- 2010–2021: Hamburger SV

Senior career*
Years	Team	Apps	(Gls)
2021–2023	Hamburger SV II	41	(2)
2022–2025	Hamburger SV	2	(0)
2024	→ Schaffhausen (loan)	9	(0)
2025–	Vitesse	35	(2)

International career^{‡}
2017–2019	Kosovo U17	11	(1)
2020–2023	Kosovo U21	18	(0)
- * Club domestic league appearances and goals as of 28 April 2026 ‡ National team caps and goals as of 21 November 2023

Valon Zumberi (born 24 November 2002) is a professional footballer who plays as a centre-back for Dutch Eerste Divisie club Vitesse. Born in Germany, he represented Kosovo at youth international level.

== Club career ==
=== Hamburger SV ===
==== First season at second team ====
On 1 April 2021, Zumberi continues his contract with Hamburger SV for another two years. In July 2021, he was officially promoted to Hamburger SV's second team competing in the Regionalliga Nord. On 15 August 2021, he made his debut with second team in a 2–4 home defeat against SV Drochtersen/Assel after being named in the starting line-up. Three days after debut, Zumberi scored his first goal for second team in his second appearance for the club in a 1–0 away win over St. Pauli II in Regionalliga Nord.

==== Promotion to the senior team ====
On 6 July 2022, Zumberi signed his first professional contract with 2. Bundesliga side Hamburger SV after agreeing to a two-year deal. On 8 October 2022, he was named as a Hamburger SV substitute for the first time in a league match against 1. FC Kaiserslautern. His debut with Hamburger SV came on 12 November in a 4–2 home win against SV Sandhausen after coming on as a substitute at 85th minute in place of Ransford-Yeboah Königsdörffer.

===== Loan to Schaffhausen =====
On 15 January 2024, Zumberi joined Swiss Challenge League side Schaffhausen, on a loan until the end of the season and received squad number 44. He returns to Hamburg on 17 June 2024, having made nine appearances in the Swiss Challenge League.

=== Vitesse ===
On 24 June 2025, Zumberi moved to the Netherlands and signed a two-year contract with Vitesse.

== International career ==
Since 2017, Zumberi is part of Kosovo at youth international level, respectively part of the U17 and U21 teams and he with these teams played twenty matches and scored one goal. On 30 May 2022, he received a call-up from the Kosovo senior national team for training session before the 2022–23 UEFA Nations League matches against Cyprus, Greece and Northern Ireland, but did not make the final squad.

In August 2023, Zumberi was included in the Kosovan senior squad for two UEFA Euro 2024 qualifying matches against Switzerland and Romania.

== Personal life ==
Zumberi was born in Hamburg, Germany to Albanian parents from Preševo. His family belongs to the Albanian minority in Serbia.
