= Vušković =

Vušković or Vuskovic is a South Slavic surname. Notable people with the surname include:

- Danijel Vušković (born 1981), Croatian footballer
- Kristina Vušković (born 1967), Serbian graph theorist
- Mario Vušković (born 2001), Croatian footballer
- Miloš Vušković (1900–1975), Montenegrin painter
- Pedro Vuskovic (1924–1993), Chilean economist and politician
- Sergio Vuskovic (born 1930), Chilean politician
- Luka Vuskovic (born 2007), Croatian footballer for Hajduk Split on loan from Premier League club Tottenham Hotspur until 2025

== See also ==
- Vuskovic plan, Chilean economic policy
