= 2026–27 Hamburger SV season =

Hamburger SV
2026–27 season
- President: Henrik Köncke
- Head coach: Merlin Polzin
- Stadium: Volksparkstadion
- Bundesliga: 13th
- DFB-Pokal: Second round
Home colours	Away colours	Third colours
- All statistics correct as of 10 October 2026.

The 2026–27 season is the 140th season in the history of Hamburger SV, and the club's second consecutive season in the Bundesliga. In addition to the domestic league, the club is also participating in the DFB-Pokal. This is the first season with Kathleen Krüger as the club's sporting director.

== Transfers ==
=== In ===
Pos.	Player	Transferred from	Fee	Date	Source
MF	(Suriname) Immanuel Pherai	(Germany) SV Elversberg	Loan return	30 June 2026	
MF	(Denmark) Albert Grønbæk	(France) Rennes	€4,700,000 (From loan to definitive purchase)	1 July 2026	
MF	(Germany) Kofi Amoako	(Germany) Dynamo Dresden	€1,800,000	7 July 2026	
MF	(France) Martin Adeline	(France) Troyes	€4,000,000	13 July 2026	
FW	(Zambia) Patson Daka	(England) Leicester City	Free (End of contract)	22 July 2026	
FW	(Nigeria) Terem Moffi	(France) Nice	€2,000,000	24 July 2026	
MF	(Morocco) Bilal Nadir	(France) Marseille	Free	24 July 2026	
DF	(Belgium) Sebastiaan Bornauw	(England) Leeds United	€1,000,000 (Loan)	19 August 2026	
MF	(Portugal) Fábio Vieira	(England) Arsenal	€9,000,000 (From loan to definitive purchase)	1 September 2026	
DF	(Morocco) Zakaria El Ouahdi	(Belgium) Genk	€8,000,000	1 September 2026	
DF	(Norway) David Møller Wolfe	(England) Wolverhampton Wanderers	€600,000 (Loan)	1 September 2026	

=== Out ===
Pos.	Player	Transferred to	Fee	Date	Source
FW	(United States) Damion Downs	(England) Southampton	Loan return	30 June 2026	
DF	(Georgia (country)) Giorgi Gocholeishvili	(Ukraine) Shakhtar Donetsk	Loan return	30 June 2026	
MF	(Nigeria) Philip Otele	(Switzerland) Basel	Loan return	30 June 2026	
MF	(Portugal) Fábio Vieira	(England) Arsenal	Loan return	30 June 2026	
DF	(Croatia) Luka Vušković	(England) Tottenham Hotspur	Loan return	30 June 2026	
FW	(Ghana) Ransford-Yeboah Königsdörffer	(Germany) Mainz 05	Free	1 July 2026	
MF	(Poland) Łukasz Poręba	(Germany) SV Elversberg	€1,600,000 (From loan to definitive purchase)	1 July 2026	
FW	(Germany) Robert Glatzel	(Germany) VfL Wolfsburg	€1,700,000	1 July 2026	
FW	(Kosovo) Emir Sahiti	(Germany) Hannover 96	Free	1 July 2026	
FW	(France) Jean-Luc Dompé	(Turkey) Konyaspor	Free	1 July 2026	
DF	(Germany) Noah Katterbach	(Germany) Eintracht Braunschweig	Loan	1 July 2026	
DF	(France) William Mikelbrencis	(Germany) Darmstadt 98	Free	1 July 2026	
GK	(Germany) Hannes Hermann	(Germany) Jahn Regensburg	Loan	1 July 2026	
DF	(France) Aboubaka Soumahoro	(Spain) Mallorca	Loan	10 July 2026	
FW	(Portugal) Fábio Baldé	(France) Strasbourg	€7,000,000	14 August 2026	
FW	(France) Rayan Philippe	(Germany) SC Paderborn	Loan	1 September 2026	
MF	(Libya) Daniel Elfadli	(Austria) LASK	Loan	2 September 2026	

== Pre-season and friendlies ==
18 July 2026 Friendly	Rapid Wien (Austria)	3–2	(Germany) Hamburger SV	Wien
19:00	Kara 3', 35'; Lemke 37' (o.g.)	Report	Poulsen 16'; Grønbæk 24'	Stadium: Allianz Stadion; Attendance: 14,541

25 July 2026 Friendly	Hamburger SV (Germany)	3–1	(Germany) 1. FC Heidenheim
14:00	Grønbæk 38'; Philippe 49'; Daka 57'	Report	Mhamdi 54'	Referee: Olcay Bingöl

1 August 2026 Friendly	Hamburger SV (Germany)	1–2	(England) Everton	Hamburg
17:00	Daka 50'	Report	Röhl 40'; Torunarigha 90+4' (o.g.)	Stadium: Volksparkstadion; Referee: Harm Osmers

== Competitions ==
=== Overall record ===
Competition	First match	Last match	Starting round	Record							
Competition	First match	Last match	Starting round	Pld	W	D	L	GF	GA	GD	Win %
Bundesliga	29 August 2026	22 May 2027	Matchday 1	5	2	0	3	5	15	−10	40.00
DFB-Pokal	24 August 2026		First round	1	1	0	0	3	0	+3	100.00
Total				6	3	0	3	8	15	−7	50.00

Last updated: 10 October 2026
Source: Soccerway

=== Bundesliga ===
Pos	Team	Pld	W	D	L	GF	GA	GD	Pts
10	FC Augsburg	10	3	3	4	23	21	+2	12
11	TSG Hoffenheim	10	4	0	6	16	18	−2	12
12	Hamburger SV	10	4	0	6	10	24	−14	12
13	Mainz 05	10	3	1	6	19	22	−3	10
14	1. FC Köln	10	2	4	4	11	15	−4	10

Updated to match(es) played on 22 November 2026. Source: Bundesliga
Rules for classification: 1) Points; 2) Goal difference; 3) Goals scored; 4) Head-to-head aggregate results; 5) Head-to-head away goals scored; 6) Away goals scored; 7) Play-off at neutral site.
(Rules 4–6 only apply after all home-and-away matches have been played between the tied teams. Rule 7 only applies after the completion of the season.)

==== Results summary ====
Overall								Home						Away					
Pld	W	D	L	GF	GA	GD	Pts	W	D	L	GF	GA	GD	W	D	L	GF	GA	GD
9	4	0	5	10	20	−10	12	3	0	1	6	7	−1	1	0	4	4	13	−9

Last updated: 6 November 2026.
Source: DFB

==== Results by round ====
Round	1	2	3	4	5	6	7	8	9	10	11	12	13	14	15	16	17	18	19	20	21	22	23	24	25	26	27	28	29	30	31	32	33	34
Ground	A	H	A	H	A	H	A	A	H	A	H	A	H	A	H	A	H	H	A	H	A	H	A	H	H	A	H	A	H	A	H	A	H	A
Result	L	L	L	W	W	W	L	L	W	L																								
Position	14	18	18	16	12			15		12																								

Updated to match(es) played on 22 November 2026. Source: DFB
A = Away; H = Home; W = Win; D = Draw; L = Loss

==== Matches ====
The league fixtures were released on 2 July 2026.

29 August 2026 1	Borussia Dortmund	2–0	Hamburger SV	Dortmund
18:30 CEST (UTC+2)	Guirassy 9'; Konstantelias 45+1'; Ryerson (yellow card) 58'; Inácio (red card) 77'; Svensson (yellow card) 85'	Report	Sambi Lokonga (yellow card) 21'	Stadium: Westfalenstadion; Attendance: 81,365; Referee: Felix Zwayer

6 September 2026 2	Hamburger SV	0–5	Mainz 05	Hamburg
15:30 CEST (UTC+2)	El Ouahdi (yellow card) 36'	Report	Becker 19', (yellow card) 90+2'; Caci (yellow card) 31'; Mwene 41', (yellow card) 85'; Tietz 48', 83'; Königsdörffer 90+1'	Stadium: Volksparkstadion; Attendance: 57,000; Referee: Tobias Reichel

13 September 2026 3	RB Leipzig	5–0	Hamburger SV	Leipzig
15:30 CEST (UTC+2)	Gomis 17'; Nusa 28'; Lukeba (yellow card) 48'; Orbán 72'; Nkunku 74'; Rômulo 77'	Report	Capaldo (yellow card) 6'; Nandja (yellow card) 71'	Stadium: Red Bull Arena; Attendance: 47,800; Referee: Florian Badstübner

19 September 2026 4	Hamburger SV	2–1	1. FC Köln	Hamburg
15:30 CEST (UTC+2)	Grønbæk (yellow card) 10'; Capaldo 44'; Poulsen 49'	Report	Mensah (yellow card) 54'; Jóhannesson (yellow card) 77'; Skhiri (yellow card) 84'; Ache 90'	Stadium: Volksparkstadion; Attendance: 57,000; Referee: Matthias Jöllenbeck

10 October 2026 5	TSG Hoffenheim	2–3	Hamburger SV	Sinsheim
15:30 CEST (UTC+2)	Bornauw 45+6' (o.g.); Conté 53'; Bernardo (yellow card) 55' (yellow-red card) 65'; Avdullahu (yellow card) 80'	Report	Poulsen 12'; Moffi 83'; Muheim 90+4'	Stadium: Rhein-Neckar-Arena; Attendance: 25,929; Referee: Harm Osmers

17 October 2026 6	Hamburger SV	1–0	VfB Stuttgart	Hamburg
15:30 CEST	Omari (yellow card) 54'; Capaldo (yellow card) 82'; Stange (yellow card) 85'; Muheim 88'			Stadium: Volksparkstadion; Attendance: 57,000; Referee: Robert Hartmann

24 October 2026 7	Paderborn	1–0	Hamburger SV	Paderborn
15:30 CEST (UTC+2)	ter Horst (yellow card) 58'; Philippe 88'		Nandja (yellow card) 53'; Lokonga (yellow card) 87'	Stadium: Home Deluxe Arena; Attendance: 15,000; Referee: Martin Petersen

1 November 2026 8	Eintracht Frankfurt	3–1	Hamburger SV	Frankfurt
16:30 CET (UTC+1)	Omari 10' (o.g.); Onyedika 47'; Ebnoutalib 69'; Baum (yellow card) 85'; Koch (yellow card) 90+8'		Moffi 14'; Nandja (yellow card) 33'; Adeline (yellow card) 70'; Omari (yellow card) 76'; Stange (yellow card) 90+8'	Stadium: Deutsche Bank Park; Attendance: 59,600; Referee: Florian Exner

7 November 2026 9	Hamburger SV	3–1	Borussia Mönchengladbach	Hamburg
15:30 CET	Muheim 11'; Nandja 59'; Grønbæk 70'; Omari (yellow card) 90+3'	Report	Itakura (yellow card) 38' (yellow-red card) 49'; Hack 44'; Castrop (yellow card) 90+2'	Stadium: Volksparkstadion; Referee: Sven Jablonski

22 November 2026 10	Werder Bremen	4–0	Hamburger SV	Bremen
16:30 CET	Pieper (yellow card) 10'; Chuki (yellow card) 39'; Deman (yellow card) 50'; Fried 55'; Njinmah 66', 70'; Füllkrug 90+2'	Report	Omari (yellow card) 23'; Capaldo (yellow card) 74'; Grønbæk (yellow card) 84'	Stadium: Weserstadion; Referee: Florian Badstübner

=== DFB-Pokal ===
24 August 2026 First round	SC Verl	0–3	Hamburger SV	Verl
18:00 CEST (UTC+2)	Waidner (yellow card) 90+3'	Report	Grønbæk 41', 46', (yellow card) 47'; Lemke 50'	Stadium: Sportclub Arena; Attendance: 5,207; Referee: Lars Erbst

27 October 2026 Second round	Hamburger SV	1–3	Eintracht Frankfurt	Hamburg
18:00 CET (UTC+1)	Moffi 79'	Report	Collins (yellow card) 17'; Götze (yellow card) 33'; Koch 56'; Maluze (yellow card) 69'; Burkardt 71'; Ebnoutalib 75'; Onyedika (yellow card) 84'	Stadium: Volksparkstadion; Referee: Tobias Stieler
