= Mario Vušković (footballer, born 1953) =

Croatian footballer (1953–1985)

Personal information
- Date of birth: 9 September 1953
- Date of death: 5 July 1985 (aged 31)
- Place of death: Split, SR Croatia, SFR Yugoslavia
- Position: Midfielder

Youth career
- –1975: Hajduk Split

Senior career*
| Years | Team | Apps | (Gls) |
| 1975–1979 | Go Ahead Eagles | 71 | (4) |
| 1979–1981 | Heerenveen | 11 | (0) |
| 1981–1985 | Omiš | | |
- * Club domestic league appearances and goals

Mario Vušković (9 September 1953 – 5 July 1985) was a Croatian professional footballer who played most of his career in the Netherlands.

== Club career ==
Having never played for the first team of Hajduk Split, Vušković went on to forge a footballing career in the Netherlands, notching over 70 appearances for Go Ahead Eagles in the Eredivisie.

== Personal life and death ==
Vušković's father, Marko, played for Hajduk Split during World War II, and went on to work as a club executive. His sons, Danijel and Ronald, also went on to play football, with Danijel playing for Hajduk Split and going on to coach their youth teams. His grandsons, Mario, Luka, Moreno and Vito, are also footballers.

He died in a car accident in July 1985, on his way to an NK Omiš game, the club he was playing for at the time.
