= Louis Lemke =

German footballer (born 2009)

Personal information
- Full name: Louis Pepe Lemke
- Date of birth: 8 October 2009 (age 17)
- Place of birth: Hamburg, Germany
- Height: 1.82 m (6 ft 0 in)
- Position: Defender

Team information
- Current team: Hamburger SV
- Number: 37

Youth career
- 2014–2017: FC Eintracht Norderstedt 03
- 2017–2023: Niendorfer TSV
- 2023–: Hamburger SV

Senior career*
Years	Team	Apps	(Gls)
2025–	Hamburger SV II	16	(3)
2026–	Hamburger SV	7	(0)

International career^{‡}
2024–2025	Germany U16	7	(0)
2025–2026	Germany U17	9	(3)
2026–	Germany U19	3	(0)
- * Club domestic league appearances and goals as of 1 November 2026 ‡ National team caps and goals as of 3 October 2026

Louis Pepe Lemke (born 8 October 2009) is a German professional footballer who plays as a defender for Bundesliga club Hamburger SV.

== Early life ==
Lemke was born on 8 October 2009. Born in Hamburg, Germany, he is a native of the city.

== Club career ==
As a youth player, Lemke joined the youth academies of FC Eintracht Norderstedt 03 and Niendorfer TSV. Following his stints there, he joined the youth academy of Bundesliga side Hamburger SV and was promoted to the club's reserve team in 2025, where he was regarded to have established himself as a regular starter while playing for them. On 8 November 2025, he debuted for them during a 1–0 away win over Hannover 96 II in the league. On 13 March 2026, he scored his first goal for them during a 2–0 away win over VfB Lübeck in the league.

In 2026, he was promoted to their senior team. On 10 May 2026, he debuted for them during a 3–2 home win over SC Freiburg in the league. On 24 August 2026, he scored his first goal for them during a 3–0 away win over SC Verl in the DFB-Pokal.

== International career ==
Lemke is a Germany youth international and has represented the country at under-16 and under-17 levels. On 15 November 2024, he debuted for the Germany national under-16 football team during a 0–1 away friendly loss to the Turkey national under-16 football team.

On 3 September 2025, he debuted for the Germany national under-17 football team during a 1–1 home friendly draw with the Israel national under-17 football team. On 11 January 2026, he scored his first goal for the Germany national under-17 football team during a 1–2 away friendly loss to the Portugal national under-17 football team. During the spring of 2026, he played for the Germany national under-17 football team for 2026 UEFA European Under-17 Championship qualification.

== Career statistics ==
As of match played 1 November 2026

Appearances and goals by club, season and competition
Club	Season	League			DFB-Pokal		Other		Total	
Club	Season	Division	Apps	Goals	Apps	Goals	Apps	Goals	Apps	Goals
Hamburger SV II	2025–26	Regionalliga Nord	14	3	—		—		14	3
Hamburger SV	2025–26	Bundesliga	1	0	—		—		1	0
Hamburger SV	2026–27	Bundesliga	6	0	1	1	—		7	1
Hamburger SV	Total		7	0	1	1	—		8	1
career total			21	3	1	1	0	0	22	4

== Honours ==
Individual

- Fritz Walter Medal: U17 Bronze Medal 2026
