= Nicolai Remberg =

German footballer (born 2000)

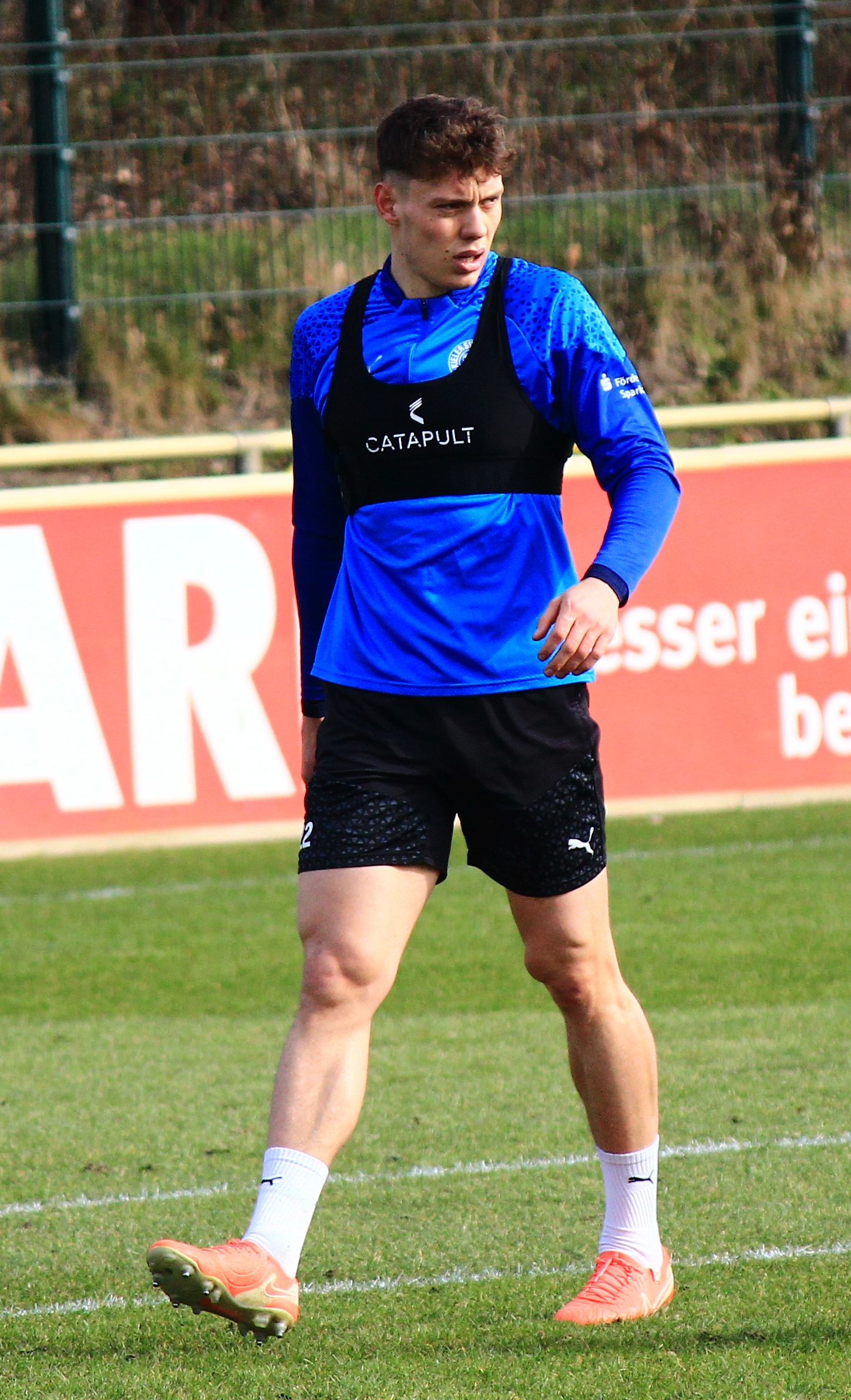
- Nicolai Remberg (2025)

Personal information
- Date of birth: 19 June 2000 (age 26)
- Place of birth: Rheine, Germany
- Height: 1.85 m (6 ft 1 in)
- Position: Defensive midfielder

Team information
- Current team: Hamburger SV
- Number: 21

Youth career
- –2018: FC Eintracht Rheine
- 2018–2019: Preußen Münster

Senior career*
Years	Team	Apps	(Gls)
2019–2021	Preußen Münster II	23	(9)
2020–2023	Preußen Münster	105	(14)
2023–2025	Holstein Kiel	64	(2)
2025–	Hamburger SV	37	(0)
- * Club domestic league appearances and goals as of 10 October 2026

Nicolai Remberg (born 19 June 2000) is a German professional footballer who plays as a defensive midfielder for Bundesliga club Hamburger SV.

== Career ==
Remberg played for FC Eintracht Rheine as a youth. He moved to Regionalliga West side Preußen Münster's youth in 2018. At Preußen Münster, he became a part of the first-team squad in 2020, subsequently establishing himself as an important player. In April 2023, he helped Preußen Münster secure promotion to the 3. Liga.

On 28 April 2023, shortly after Preußen Münster achieved promotion to the 3. Liga, Remberg's move to 2. Bundesliga club Holstein Kiel was announced. He signed a contract until 2026 and would join Kiel ahead of the 2023–24 season. The transfer fee to be paid to Preußen Münster was undisclosed. Remberg was part of the squad that secured the club's first-ever promotion to the 2024–25 Bundesliga, where he went on to make 32 appearances in the top flight.

On 30 May 2025, Hamburger SV, having returned to the Bundesliga, activated Remberg's €2.4 million release clause. A few days later, on 2 June, the club announced his signature.

== Career statistics ==
As of match played 10 October 2026

Appearances and goals by club, season and competition
Club	Season	League			DFB-Pokal		Other		Total	
Club	Season	Division	Apps	Goals	Apps	Goals	Apps	Goals	Apps	Goals
Preußen Münster II	2019–20	Oberliga Westfalen	20	8	—		—		20	8
Preußen Münster II	2020–21	Oberliga Westfalen	3	1	—		—		3	1
Preußen Münster II	Total		23	9	—		—		23	9
Preußen Münster	2020–21	Regionalliga West	38	3	—		2 (Note: Appearances in Westphalia Cup)	0	40	3
Preußen Münster	2021–22	Regionalliga West	36	4	2	0	5	1	43	5
Preußen Münster	2022–23	Regionalliga West	31	7	0	0	2	0	33	7
Preußen Münster	Total		105	14	2	0	9	1	116	15
Holstein Kiel	2023–24	2. Bundesliga	32	2	2	0	—		34	2
Holstein Kiel	2024–25	Bundesliga	32	0	1	0	—		33	0
Holstein Kiel	Total		64	2	3	0	—		67	2
Hamburger SV	2025–26	Bundesliga	32	0	2	0	—		34	0
Hamburger SV	2026–27	Bundesliga	5	0	1	0	—		6	0
Hamburger SV	2027–28	Bundesliga	0	0	0	0	—		0	0
Hamburger SV	Total		37	0	3	0	—		40	0
Career total			229	25	8	0	9	1	246	26
