= SKV =

SKV or skv may refer to:

- SKV Rutesheim, a German association football club based in the city of Rutesheim
- Skou language (ISO 639-3: skv), a Papuan language of Indonesia
- Sky Regional Airlines (ICAO: SKV), a defunct Canadian airline
- St. Catherine International Airport (IATA: SKV), an airport serving St. Catherine, South Sinai Governorate, Egypt
