= Moreno Vušković =

Croatian footballer

Personal information
- Date of birth: 21 April 2003 (age 23)
- Place of birth: Split, Croatia
- Height: 1.93 m (6 ft 4 in)
- Position: Forward

Team information
- Current team: Horn

Youth career
- –2016: RNK Split
- 2016–2017: Adriatic Split
- 2017–2019: NK Solin

Senior career*
Years	Team	Apps	(Gls)
2019–2020	Solin	2	(0)
2020	Inter Zaprešić	3	(0)
2020–2022	Dinamo Zagreb	0	(0)
2022	Radomlje	0	(0)
2022	CSKA Sofia	0	(0)
2022	→ Litex Lovech (loan)	1	(0)
2023	Kustošija	1	(0)
2023–2024	Hrvace	14	(5)
2024	Legnano	4	(1)
2024–2025	Uskok	15	(6)
2025	Zmaj Makarska	11	(1)
2025	Kamen (P)	5	(2)
2026	OSK	12	(2)
2026–	Horn	0	(0)

International career
2018	Croatia U15	2	(0)
2020	Croatia U17	1	(0)
- * Club domestic league appearances and goals as of 23:18, 5 July 2026 (UTC)

Moreno Vušković (born 21 April 2003) is a Croatian footballer currently playing as a forward for SV Horn.

== Club career ==
Vušković moved to Dinamo Zagreb in August 2020, having represented NK Solin and Inter Zaprešić in the 2. HNL and 1. HNL, respectively. After two years, he moved to Slovenia to sign for Radomlje in February 2022.

In February 2023, Vušković joined Kustošija from CSKA Sofia. However, after one appearance, he briefly returned to Solin on trial, scoring in three friendly games in July 2023. One of these goals came against Hrvace, and Vušković would go on to join the side the following month.

After half a season with Hrvace, Vušković moved to Italy, signing with Serie D side Legnano in February 2024. However, after just four appearances and one goal, he returned to Croatia in August, joining Treća NL club Uskok. In February 2025, he joined Zmaj Makarska, and scored on his debut in the Split Cup - the only goal in a 1–0 win against Jadran Tučepi.

After leaving Smaj Makarska, he had a spell with Kamen Ivanbegovina, leaving the club in October 2025. In January 2026 he joined NK OSK Otok in the First County Football League, the fifth division of Croatian football.

On 26 June 2026 he was announced as a new signing for Austrian Regionalliga East club SV Horn.

== International career ==
Vušković has represented Croatia at youth international level.

== Personal life ==
Hailing from a footballing family, Vušković's father, Ronald, is a semi-professional footballer in Croatia, while his grandfather, Mario, played for the youth teams of Hajduk Split during the tenure of Tomislav Ivić, and went on to forge a footballing career in the Netherlands. His great-grandfather, Marko, also played for Hajduk Split during World War II, and went on to work as a club executive. His brother, Vito, currently plays for Rudeš.

In addition to this, his uncle, Danijel, formerly played for Hajduk Split, and now serves as a coach for the youth team, while cousins Mario and Luka also played for Hajduk Split, with Mario and Luka going on to Hamburger SV in Germany and Tottenham Hotspur in England.

== Career statistics ==
=== Club ===
As of 5 July 2026.

Appearances and goals by club, season and competition
Club	Season	League			Cup		Other		Total	
Club	Season	Division	Apps	Goals	Apps	Goals	Apps	Goals	Apps	Goals
NK Solin	2019–20	2. HNL	2	0	0	0	0	0	2	0
Inter Zaprešić	2019–20	1. HNL	3	0	0	0	0	0	3	0
Dinamo Zagreb	2020–21	1. HNL	0	0	0	0	0	0	0	0
Dinamo Zagreb	2021–22	1. HNL	0	0	0	0	0	0	0	0
Dinamo Zagreb	Total		0	0	0	0	0	0	0	0
Radomlje	2021–22	Slovenian PrvaLiga	0	0	0	0	0	0	0	0
CSKA Sofia	2022–23	Parva Liga	0	0	0	0	0	0	0	0
Litex Lovech (loan)	2022–23	Vtora liga	1	0	0	0	0	0	1	0
Kustošija	2022–23	Prva NL	1	0	0	0	0	0	1	0
Hrvace	2023–24	Druga NL	14	5	0	0	0	0	14	5
Legnano	2023–24	Serie D	4	1	0	0	0	0	4	1
Uskok	2024–25	Treća NL	15	6	0	0	0	0	15	6
Zmaj Makarska	2024–25	Treća NL	11	1	0	0	2 (Note: Appearances in the NSŽSD Cup)	1	13	2
Kamen (P)	2025–26	Treća NL	5	2	0	0	0	0	5	2
OSK	2025–26	1. ŽNL Splitsko-dalmatinska	12	2	0	0	2	1	14	3
Horn	2026–27	Regionalliga East	0	0	0	0	0	0	0	0
Career total			68	17	0	0	4	2	72	19
