= Anssi Suhonen =

Finnish footballer (born 2001)

Personal information
- Full name: Anssi Tapio Suhonen
- Date of birth: 14 January 2001 (age 25)
- Place of birth: Järvenpää, Finland
- Height: 1.75 m (5 ft 9 in)
- Position: Midfielder

Team information
- Current team: OB
- Number: 10

Youth career
- –2012: JäPS
- 2012–2016: KäPa
- 2017–2021: Hamburger SV

Senior career*
Years	Team	Apps	(Gls)
2019–2025	Hamburger SV II	17	(7)
2021–2025	Hamburger SV	48	(2)
2025	→ Jahn Regensburg (loan)	13	(0)
2025	→ Östers IF (loan)	13	(1)
2026–	OB	11	(0)

International career^{‡}
2015	Finland U15	2	(0)
2016	Finland U16	4	(0)
2016–2018	Finland U17	14	(1)
2019	Finland U18	2	(0)
2018–2019	Finland U19	11	(0)
2021–2022	Finland U21	7	(2)
2022–	Finland	18	(0)
Medal record
Hamburger SV
Third place	2. Bundesliga	2021–22
Third place	2. Bundesliga	2022–23
- * Club domestic league appearances and goals as of 19 May 2026 ‡ National team caps and goals as of 13 November 2026

Anssi Tapio Suhonen (born 14 January 2001) is a Finnish professional footballer who plays as a midfielder for Danish Superliga club OB. He also plays for the Finland national team.

== Early career ==
Born in Järvenpää, Suhonen started playing football in a youth team of the local club JäPS, before joining the Helsinki-based renowned Käpylän Pallo academy in 2012.

== Club career ==
=== Hamburger SV ===
Suhonen joined the youth academy of Hamburger SV in 2017, moving from the Finnish club KäPa. Suhonen was the first player to move abroad from KäPa for a "significant transfer fee".

He advanced through the ranks of HSV U17 and U19 academy teams, playing 62 youth league matches and scoring 12 goals in total for both teams combined.

Suhonen made his professional debut with the club's first team in a 2–1 DFB-Pokal win over Eintracht Braunschweig 8 August 2021. He scored his first goal for HSV in 2. Bundesliga on 23 April 2022, in a 4–2 away win against Jahn Regensburg.

His major breakthrough has been delayed due to multiple consecutive injuries. In July 2020, while playing with the HSV II reserve team, Suhonen suffered a knee injury in training and was ruled out roughly for six months, eventually missing the whole 2020–21 season. In May 2022, he suffered a broken fibula in training and was ruled out for months. In July 2023, Suhonen suffered a broken fibula again in a HSV training camp in Austria. In October 2023, while still recovering, the same injury occurred again and required a surgery. On 3 February 2024, Suhonen made his first official appearance since June 2023, as a late substitute to Jean-Luc Dompé, in a 2–1 away win against Hertha Berlin.

==== Loan to Jahn Regensburg ====
On 17 January 2026, Suhonen was loaned out to Jahn Regensburg for the remainder of the season. Two weeks later on 17 January, Suhonen debuted for Regensburg in 2. Bundesliga, in a match against Hannover 96.

==== Loan to Öster ====
On 22 July 2025, Suhonen was loaned out to Swedish Allsvenskan club Öster for the remainder of the season. On 4 October, he scored his first goal for Öster, by a bicycle kick in a 3–0 home win over Halmstad.

=== Odense Boldklub ===
On 17 January 2026, Suhonen joined to Danish Superliga club OB on a deal that runs until the summer of 2029.

== International career ==
Suhonen represented Finland at various youth national team levels.

He made his debut for the Finland senior national team on 17 November 2022, in a friendly match against North Macedonia in Toše Proeski Arena, Skopje.

== Career statistics ==
=== Club ===
As of 27 March 2026

Appearances and goals by club, season and competition
Club	Season	League			National cup (Note: Includes DFB-Pokal)		Continental		Other		Total	
Club	Season	Division	Apps	Goals	Apps	Goals	Apps	Goals	Apps	Goals	Apps	Goals
Hamburger SV II	2019–20	Regionalliga Nord	1	0	—		—		—		1	0
Hamburger SV II	2021–22	Regionalliga Nord	3	3	—		—		—		4	3
Hamburger SV II	2024–25	Regionalliga Nord	13	4	—		—		—		13	4
Hamburger SV II	Total		17	7	—		—		—		17	7
Hamburger SV	2021–22	2. Bundesliga	18	2	2	0	—		0 (Note: Includes Bundesliga Promotion Play-Offs)	0	20	2
Hamburger SV	2022–23	2. Bundesliga	16	0	1	0	—		1	0	18	0
Hamburger SV	2023–24	2. Bundesliga	13	0	0	0	—		—		13	0
Hamburger SV	2024–25	2. Bundesliga	1	0	0	0	—		—		1	0
Hamburger SV	2025–26	Bundesliga	0	0	0	0	—		—		0	0
Hamburger SV	Total		48	2	3	0	—		1	0	52	2
Jahn Regensburg (loan)	2024–25	2. Bundesliga	13	0	0	0	—		—		13	0
Öster (loan)	2025	Allsvenskan	13	1	0	0	—		—		13	1
OB	2025–26	Danish Superliga	6	0	0	0	—		—		6	0
Career total			98	10	3	0	0	0	1	0	101	10

=== International ===
As of match played on 12 November 2026

National team	Year	Competitive		Friendly		Total	
National team	Year	Apps	Goals	Apps	Goals	Apps	Goals
Finland	2022	0	0	2	0	2	0
Finland	2023	4 (Note: Appearances in the UEFA Euro 2024 qualifying.)	0	0	0	4	0
Finland	2024	0	0	2	0	2	0
Finland	2025	2 (Note: Appearances in the 2026 FIFA World Cup qualification.)	0	2	0	4	0
Finland	2026	2 (Note: Appearances in the 2026–27 UEFA Nations League C.)	0	4 (Note: Includes two appearances in the 2026 FIFA Series.)	0	6	0
Total		8	0	10	0	18	0

== Honours ==
Finland

- FIFA Series: 2026
