= Kathleen Krüger =

German footballer (born 1985)

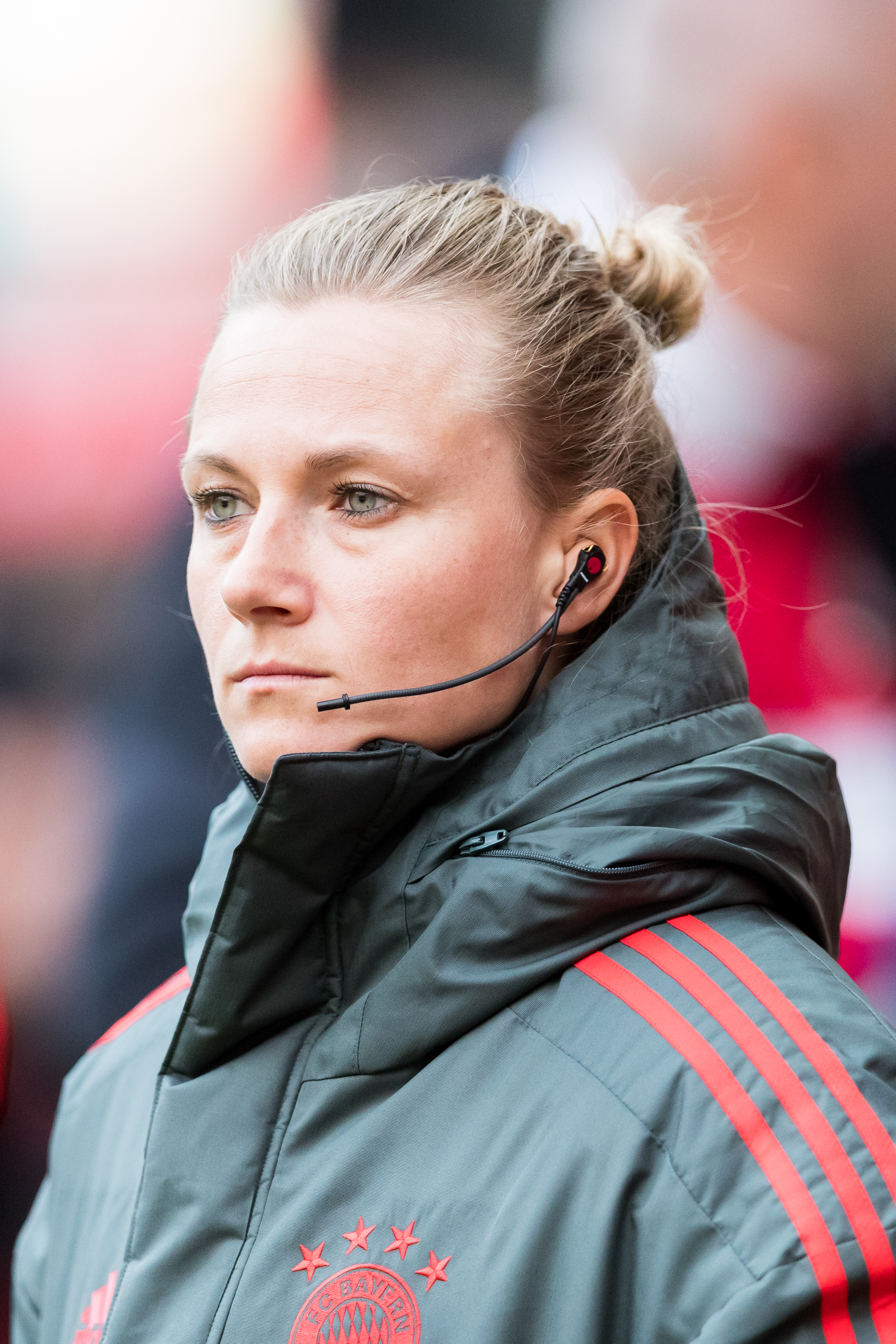
- Krüger in 2019

Personal information
- Date of birth: 17 May 1985 (age 41)
- Place of birth: Eching, West Germany
- Height: 1.71 m (5 ft 7 in)
- Position: Midfielder

Team information
- Current team: Hamburger SV (sporting director)

Youth career
- FC Phönix Schleißheim
- –2003: FFC Wacker München

Senior career*
Years	Team	Apps	(Gls)
2003–2004	Bayern Munich II	15	(2)
2004–2009	Bayern Munich	33	(1)
2017	SC Amicitia Munich	7	(2)
- * Club domestic league appearances and goals

Kathleen Krüger (born 17 May 1985) is a German former footballer who played as a midfielder for Bayern Munich. She worked in off-field roles for the men's first team of Bayern Munich from 2009 to 2026, last serving as the club's Senior Sport Strategy Official. She was later appointed sporting director of Hamburger SV, effective from the start of the 2026–27 season.

She is the only female team manager in the Bundesliga and has been described as "the league's most powerful woman".

== Playing career ==
Krüger who grew up in Eching, practiced karate and was even appointed to national competitions. However, due to lack of time, she later gave up karate and concentrated on football. She began in the youth department of FC Phönix Schleißheim, a club in the north of Munich, she later moved to FFC Wacker Munich (de). At the age of 18, she switched to Bayern Munich II in summer 2003.

After only one season in the Regionalliga Süd, she moved up to the first team of Bayern Munich for the 2004–05 season. She made her Bundesliga debut on 24 October 2004 in a 4–0 win in the away game against VfL Wolfsburg after being substituted on for Felicia Notbom in the 87th minute. After eleven league games, in which she remained without scoring, she ended her debut season in the senior division. In the following season, in which she played 14 games, she scored her only Bundesliga goal on May 7, 2006 in a 6–0 home win against FSV Frankfurt with the goal to make it 5–0 in the 48th minute. In the 2006–07 season, she played six matches; in the following two seasons, she was used in only one match, most recently on November 2, 2008 in a 5–0 win in the away game against Herford SV after her substitution for Mandy Islacker in the 79th minute.

At the age of 24, she retired from playing professionally and was already making plans for her future after football. In autumn 2017, she played a few games for the fifth-tier league club SC Amicitia Munich.

== Administrative career ==
=== Bayern Munich ===
After starting her studies in international management, while also working in the organization of the women's Football team at Bayern Munich, she broke off her studies after just one semester and became the assistant to the sports director Christian Nerlinger in 2009. After his departure in 2012, she became the team manager of the professional team at Bayern Munich and was responsible for organizational matters relating to the team.

In June 2024, she was appointed to a staff position as senior leading expert sport strategy and development in the board of directors' sports division.

=== Hamburger SV ===
On 12 May 2026, Krüger was announced as the new sporting director of Hamburger SV, with her appointment set to begin on 1 July.

== Personal life ==
In late June 2021, Krüger gave birth to a son, partnered with Nora Bohaimid, who is an educator at the youth campus of FC Bayern, and former player at SC Amicitia Munich.

== Awards and achievements ==
In March 2022, Krüger was awarded the Bavarian Order of Merit. In May 2023, she completed an 18-month course in "Management in Professional Football", in which she earned a certificate from the DFB and DFL.
