= Daniel Elfadli =

Footballer (born 1997)

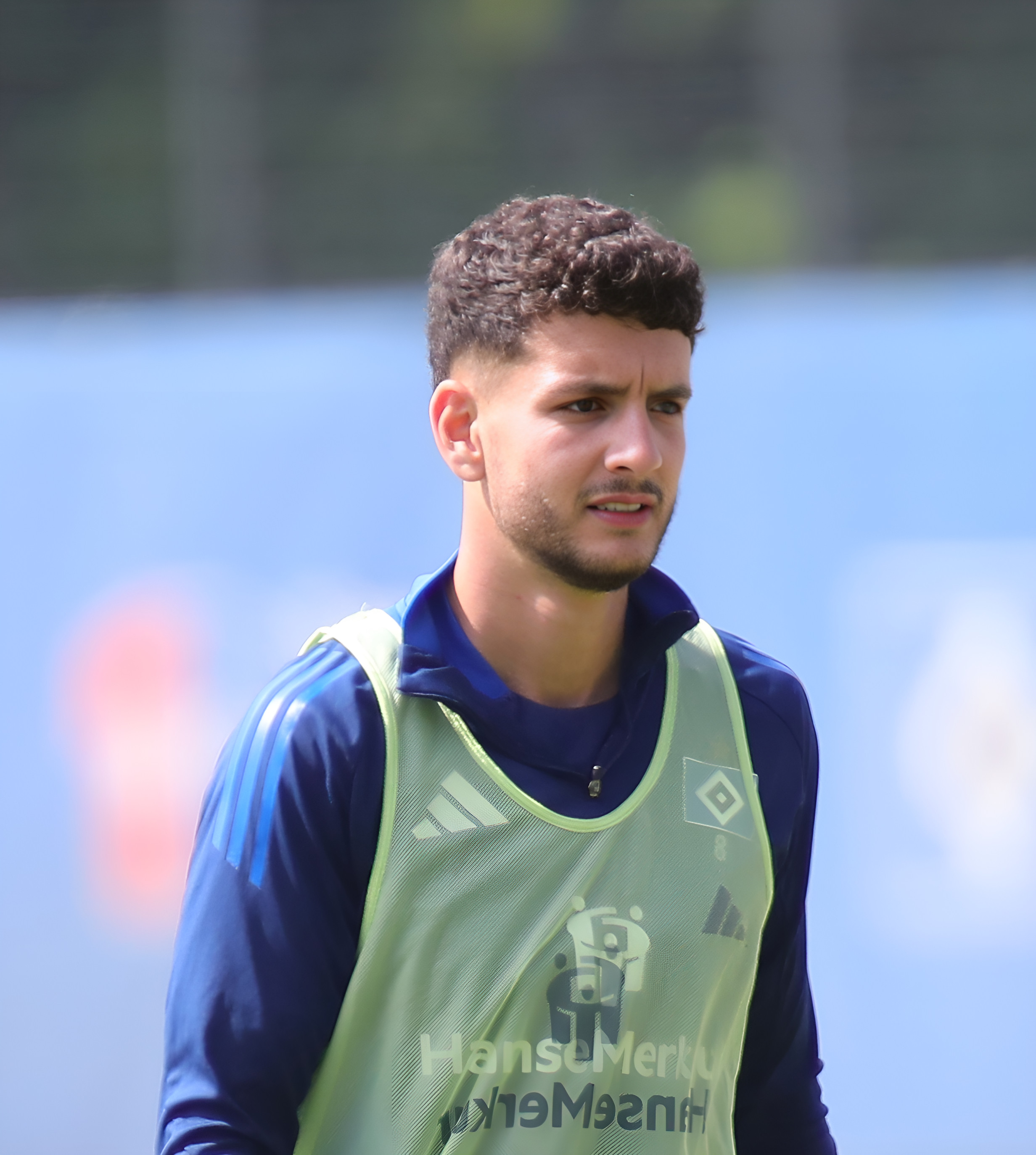
- Elfadli with Hamburger SV in 2025

Personal information
- Full name: Daniel Abdullah Elfadli
- Date of birth: 6 April 1997 (age 29)
- Place of birth: Leonberg, Germany
- Height: 1.88 m (6 ft 2 in)
- Position: Defensive midfielder

Team information
- Current team: LASK (on loan from Hamburger SV)
- Number: 23

Youth career
- 2010–2011: TSG Leonberg
- 2011–2013: Eltingen
- 2013–2016: SKV Rutesheim

Senior career*
Years	Team	Apps	(Gls)
2016–2018	SKV Rutesheim	53	(7)
2018–2020	SSV Reutlingen 05	47	(2)
2020–2021	FC Nöttingen	11	(0)
2021–2022	VfR Aalen	28	(0)
2022–2024	1. FC Magdeburg	53	(3)
2024–	Hamburger SV	52	(3)
2026–	→ LASK (loan)	3	(0)

International career^{‡}
2022–	Libya	4	(1)
- * Club domestic league appearances and goals as of 31 October 2026 ‡ National team caps and goals as of 5 January 2024

Daniel Elfadli (Arabic: دانيال الفاضلي, born 6 April 1997) is a professional footballer who plays as a defensive midfielder for Austrian Bundesliga club LASK, on loan from Bundesliga club Hamburger SV. Born in Germany, he represents the Libya national team.

== Club career ==
Elfadli is a youth product of TSG Leonberg, Eltingen and SKV Rutesheim. He began his senior career in the seventh division of Germany, the Landesliga, with Rutesheim in 2016. In 2018, he moved to SSV Reutlingen 05, and his success there earned him a move to FC Nöttingen in the Oberliga. He spent the 2021–22 season with VfR Aalen in the Regionalliga. 2. Bundesliga side 1. FC Magdeburg scouted him, and after eight games signed him in advance of the 2022–23 season.

On 1 July 2024, Elfadli signed with Hamburger SV. He played a key role in Hamburger SV's promotion after seven seasons. However, a training injury on 7 November 2025, sidelined him for nearly a month, subsequently reducing his appearances in the starting lineup.

On 2 September 2026, he joined Austrian Bundesliga club LASK on loan.

== International career ==
Born in Germany, Elfadli is of Libyan descent. He was called up to the Libya national team for a set of friendlies in September 2022. He made his debut with Libya in a 0–0 friendly tie with Uganda on 21 September 2022.

Again in January 2024, he was called up for the Libya national team for two friendly matches against Indonesia in Turkey, Libya has won them both with scores of 4–0 and 2–1.

== Career statistics ==
=== Club ===
As of match played 3 November 2026

Appearances and goals by club, season and competition
Club	Season	League			Cup		Europe		Other		Total	
Club	Season	Division	Apps	Goals	Apps	Goals	Apps	Goals	Apps	Goals	Apps	Goals
SKV Rutesheim	2016–17	Verbandsliga Württemberg	26	4	—		—		1 (Note: Appearances in Württemberg Cup)	0	27	4
SKV Rutesheim	2017–18	Verbandsliga Württemberg	27	3	—		—		2	0	29	3
SKV Rutesheim	Total		53	7	—		—		2	0	55	7
SSV Reutlingen 05	2018–19	Oberliga Baden-Württemberg	27	1	—		—		4	1	31	2
SSV Reutlingen 05	2019–20	Oberliga Baden-Württemberg	20	1	—		—		3	1	23	2
SSV Reutlingen 05	Total		47	2	—		—		7	2	54	4
FC Nöttingen	2019–20	Oberliga Baden-Württemberg	0	0	—		—		1 (Note: Appearances in Baden Cup)	0	1	0
FC Nöttingen	2020–21	Oberliga Baden-Württemberg	11	0	—		—		2	0	13	0
FC Nöttingen	Total		11	0	—		—		3	0	14	0
VfR Aalen	2021–22	Regionalliga Südwest	28	0	—		—		3	0	31	0
1. FC Magdeburg	2022–23	2. Bundesliga	26	3	1	0	—		—		27	3
1. FC Magdeburg	2023–24	2. Bundesliga	27	0	2	0	—		—		29	0
1. FC Magdeburg	Total		53	3	3	0	—		—		56	3
Hamburger SV	2024–25	2. Bundesliga	31	3	1	0	—		—		32	3
Hamburger SV	2025–26	Bundesliga	21	0	2	0	—		—		23	0
Hamburger SV	Total		52	3	3	0	—		—		55	3
LASK	2026–27	Austrian Bundesliga	3	0	2	0	2 (Note: Appearances in UEFA Champions League)	0	—		7	0
Career total			247	15	8	0	2	0	16	2	273	17

=== International ===
As of match played 5 January 2024

Appearances and goals by national team and year
National team	Year	Apps	Goals
Libya	2022	3	1
Libya	2024	1	0
Total		4	1

Scores and results list Libya's goal tally first, score column indicates score after each Elfadli goal.

List of international goals scored by Daniel Elfadli
No.	Date	Venue	Opponent	Score	Result	Competition
1	17 November 2022	Zeytinköy 1 Nolu Saha, Antalya, Turkey	Niger	2–3	2–3	Friendly
