= Albert Sambi Lokonga =

Belgian footballer (born 1999)

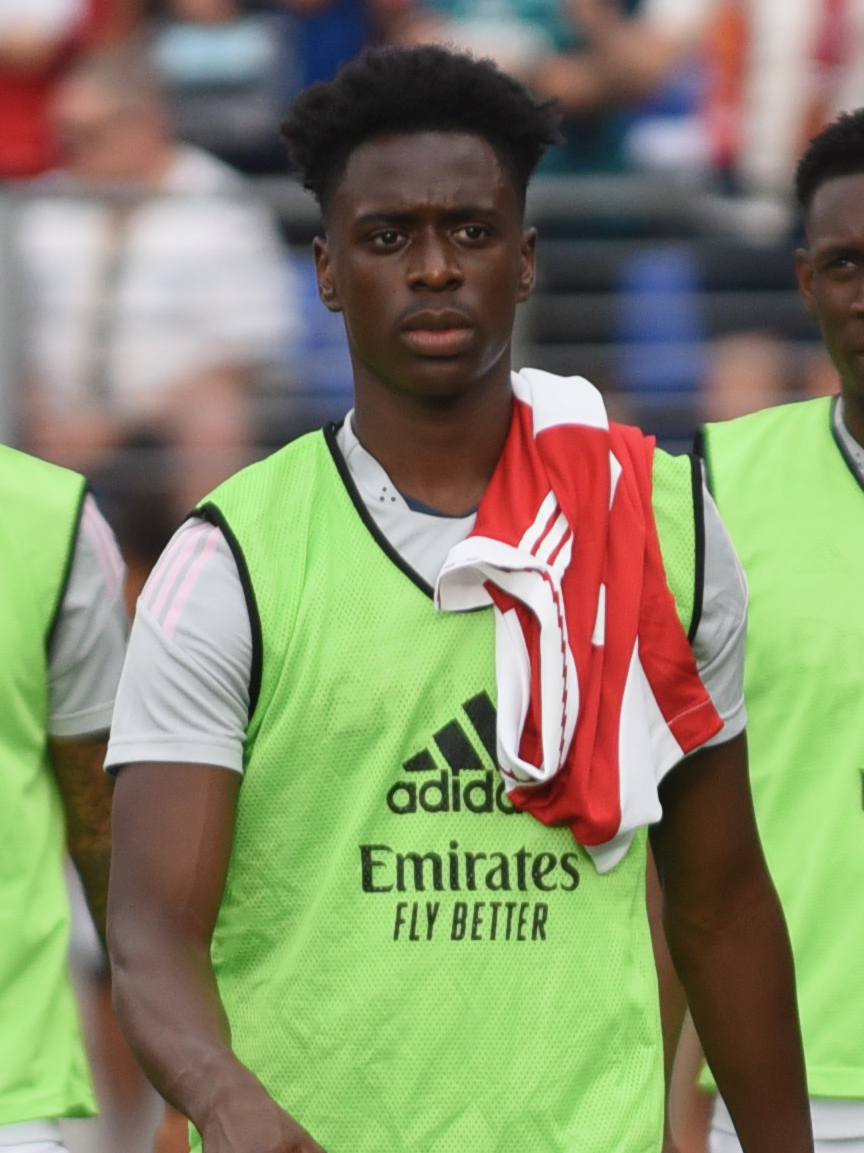
- Sambi Lokonga with Arsenal in 2022

Personal information
- Full name: Albert-Mboyo Sambi Lokonga
- Date of birth: 22 October 1999 (age 27)
- Place of birth: Verviers, Liège, Belgium
- Height: 1.83 m (6 ft 0 in)
- Position: Central midfielder

Team information
- Current team: Hamburger SV
- Number: 6

Youth career
- 2010–2017: Anderlecht

Senior career*
Years	Team	Apps	(Gls)
2017–2021	Anderlecht	69	(3)
2021–2025	Arsenal	25	(0)
2023	→ Crystal Palace (loan)	9	(0)
2023–2024	→ Luton Town (loan)	17	(1)
2024–2025	→ Sevilla (loan)	22	(0)
2025–	Hamburger SV	32	(5)

International career^{‡}
2016	Belgium U17	1	(0)
2018	Belgium U19	1	(0)
2019–2020	Belgium U21	6	(2)
2021–	Belgium	2	(0)
- * Club domestic league appearances and goals as of 1 November 2026 ‡ National team caps and goals as of 17 November 2024 (UTC)

Albert-Mboyo Sambi Lokonga (born 22 October 1999) is a Belgian professional footballer who plays as a central midfielder for Bundesliga club Hamburger SV and the Belgium national team.

Sambi Lokonga came through Anderlecht's youth academy and made his senior debut with the club in 2017, aged 18. In 2021, he made a £17.2 million switch to Premier League side Arsenal, where he embarked on three further loan moves to Crystal Palace, Luton Town, and Sevilla, during the 2022−23, 2023−24, and 2024−25 campaigns, respectively.

== Early life ==
Sambi Lokonga was born in Verviers, Belgium and is of Congolese descent; his brother Paul-José M'Poku is also a professional footballer.

== Club career ==
=== Anderlecht ===
Having first joined their youth academy in 2010, Sambi Lokonga signed his first professional contract with Anderlecht on 10 November 2017. He made his professional debut for Anderlecht in a 1–0 Belgian First Division A win over Eupen on 22 December 2017. In November 2019, Sambi Lokonga extended his contract with the club until 2023. On 27 September 2020, he scored the first goal of his senior career as Anderlecht drew 1–1 with Eupen.

=== Arsenal ===
On 19 July 2021, Sambi Lokonga signed a long-term contract with English club Arsenal after completing an approximately £17.2 million transfer. Arsenal manager Mikel Arteta was impressed with Sambi Lokonga, citing his intelligence and maturity for a young player. Sambi Lokonga made his debut in a 2−0 away loss against Brentford. During his first season at Arsenal he featured in the Amazon Original sports docuseries All or Nothing: Arsenal, which followed the club's progress during their campaign.

==== Loan to Crystal Palace ====
On 31 January 2023, fellow Premier League side Crystal Palace announced the signing of Sambi Lokonga on a short-term loan deal until the end of the 2022−23 season. He made his debut for the club on 4 February, coming on as a substitute for Will Hughes in a 2–1 away loss to Manchester United.

==== Loan to Luton Town ====
On the final day of the Summer transfer window, Sambi Lokonga joined newly promoted Premier League side Luton Town on a season-long loan. He made his debut for the club on 16 September in a 1–0 loss against Fulham at Craven Cottage; he started the match and played 75 minutes before being substituted. In his second game he picked up a hamstring injury and did not play for three months. Upon returning, he became a regular in the side's midfield; club manager Rob Edwards regularly praised Sambi Lokonga for his stand-out performances in a struggling team. Although the club was eventually relegated to the Championship, his loan at Luton Town was largely seen as successful.

==== Loan to Sevilla ====
On 15 July 2024, Sambi Lokonga joined La Liga side Sevilla on a season-long loan deal.

=== Hamburger SV ===
On 1 September 2025, Sambi Lokonga moved to Germany and joined Bundesliga side Hamburger SV on a permanent fee worth €3,000,000.

== International career ==
Having previously played for Belgium at Belgium U17, Belgium U19 and Belgium U21 levels, Sambi Lokonga was called up to the senior Belgium squad in March 2021. He made his debut on 2 September 2021 in a World Cup qualifier against Estonia, a 5–2 away victory. He was introduced as a substitute for Eden Hazard in the 74th minute.

== Career statistics ==
=== Club ===
As of match played 1 November 2026

Appearances and goals by club, season and competition
Club	Season	League			National cup (Note: Includes Belgian Cup, FA Cup, Copa del Rey)		League cup (Note: Includes EFL Cup)		Europe		Total	
Club	Season	Division	Apps	Goals	Apps	Goals	Apps	Goals	Apps	Goals	Apps	Goals
Anderlecht	2017–18	Belgian Pro League	7	0	0	0	—		0	0	7	0
Anderlecht	2018–19	Belgian Pro League	6	0	0	0	—		2 (Note: Appearances in UEFA Europa League)	0	8	0
Anderlecht	2019–20	Belgian Pro League	23	0	3	0	—		—		26	0
Anderlecht	2020–21	Belgian Pro League	33	3	4	0	—		—		37	3
Anderlecht	Total		69	3	7	0	—		2	0	78	3
Arsenal	2021–22	Premier League	19	0	1	0	4	0	—		24	0
Arsenal	2022–23	Premier League	6	0	2	0	1	0	6	0	15	0
Arsenal	2023–24	Premier League	0	0	–		–		–		0	0
Arsenal	2024–25	Premier League	0	0	–		–		–		0	0
Arsenal	2025–26	Premier League	0	0	–		–		–		0	0
Arsenal	Total		25	0	3	0	5	0	6	0	39	0
Crystal Palace (loan)	2022–23	Premier League	9	0	—		—		—		9	0
Luton Town (loan)	2023–24	Premier League	17	1	2	0	0	0	—		19	1
Sevilla (loan)	2024–25	La Liga	22	0	1	0	—		—		23	0
Hamburger SV	2025–26	Bundesliga	25	5	0	0	—		—		25	5
Hamburger SV	2026–27	Bundesliga	6	0	2	0	—		—		8	0
Hamburger SV	Total		31	5	2	0	—		—		33	5
Career total			173	9	15	0	5	0	8	0	201	9

=== International ===
As of match played 17 November 2024

Appearances and goals by national team and year
National team	Year	Apps	Goals
Belgium	2021	1	0
Belgium	2024	1	0
Total		2	0

== Personal life ==
Lokonga can speak several languages at different levels of fluency, these include English, French, Spanish, Dutch and Ngala.
