= Mario Vušković =

Croatian footballer

Personal information
- Date of birth: 16 November 2001 (age 25)
- Place of birth: Split, Croatia
- Height: 1.89 m (6 ft 2 in)
- Position: Centre-back

Team information
- Current team: Hamburger SV
- Number: 44

Youth career
- –2016: RNK Split
- 2016–2019: Hajduk Split

Senior career*
Years	Team	Apps	(Gls)
2018–2019	Hajduk Split II	19	(1)
2019–2022	Hajduk Split	42	(3)
2021–2022	→ Hamburger SV (loan)	24	(1)
2022–	Hamburger SV	16	(2)

International career^{‡}
2016	Croatia U15	5	(0)
2017–2018	Croatia U17	16	(5)
2018–2020	Croatia U19	11	(2)
2019	Croatia U20	1	(0)
2020–2022	Croatia U21	15	(2)
- * Club domestic league appearances and goals as of 27 January 2023 ‡ National team caps and goals as of 27 September 2022

Mario Vušković (Croatian pronunciation: [mâːrio ʋûʃkoʋitɕ]; born 16 November 2001) is a Croatian professional footballer who plays as a centre-back for Bundesliga club Hamburger SV. He was banned for 2 years for doping on 30 March 2023. The ban was later extended to November 2026.

== Club career ==
=== Early career ===
Vušković started playing football by joining RNK Split academy, before moving to the academy of Dalmatian giants Hajduk Split in 2016. Initially a defensive midfielder, he was moved back to the centre back position in the youth teams. In October 2018, he was included in The Guardian's Next Generation list.

=== Hajduk Split ===
On 18 August 2019, Vušković made his Prva HNL debut for Hajduk in the 3–0 victory over Gorica. However, he did not proceed to get many opportunities during Damir Burić's tenure at the club. On 16 November, he fractured his arm while on international duty in Elbasan, in Croatia U20's friendly 1–0 victory over Albania, which sidelined him for three months. During the tenure of Igor Tudor at the club, Vušković solidified his spot in the starting XI following the COVID-19 suspension of the league and injuries of Ardian Ismajli and Nihad Mujakić. He scored his first goal for Hajduk Split on the 16 June 2020 in the 2–3 defeat to Varaždin. On 25 July, the last matchday, he was shown two yellow cards and sent off in the 1–4 victory over Inter Zaprešić.

Ahead of and during the 2020–21 season, Vušković attracted attention of various Serie A clubs, most notably Napoli. However, club president Lukša Jakobušić stopped the transfer, dubbing Vušković the "club project". On 27 January 2021, Vušković scored the opener in a 3–1 derby defeat to Dinamo Zagreb. On 20 March, he assisted Marin Ljubičić for the only goal in a 1–0 derby victory over Šibenik. In the beginning of May, Vušković sparked significant interest from Celtic and Torino. On 12 May, he scored the first goal and provided Stipe Biuk with an assist for the fourth in a 4–0 victory over Gorica.

=== Hamburger SV ===
On 31 August 2021, Vušković signed a two-year loan deal with 2. Bundesliga club Hamburger SV, with an option to buy. He made his debut on 18 September in a 2–0 victory over Werder Bremen. Despite initial struggles, within the first three months he became a nailed-on starter, and his performances led to the club signing him permanently on 15 March 2022. On 16 April, Vušković scored his debut goal for Hamburg, a free kick in a 3–0 victory over Karlsruhe.

On 12 November 2022, Vušković failed a drug test, prompting German Football Association (DFB)'s anti-doping department to launch an investigation. On 30 March 2023, Vušković was banned by the DFB Sports Court for two years due to EPO doping. The club and the player filed an appeal for the ban due to multiple irregularities during the investigation; however, Nationale Anti Doping Agentur (NADA) did the same seeking a four-year ban. The ban was set to run retroactively from 15 November 2022 to 14 November 2024. However, In August 2024, Court of Arbitration for Sport extended the ban until 15 November 2026.

== International career ==
Vušković was part of Dario Bašić's 18-man squad for UEFA Under-17 Euro 2017. He made one appearance at the tournament, in the 1–1 draw with Spain, as Croatia finished at the bottom of the group.

He earned his first call-up to Croatia under-21 team in August 2020, ahead of UEFA Under-21 Euro 2021 qualifiers against Greece and the Czech Republic. He made his debut on 12 November, in a 2–2 away draw with Scotland. On 9 March 2021, Vušković was named in Igor Bišćan's 23-man squad for the group stage of the tournament. On 17 May, he was named in Bišćan's 23-man squad for the knockout stage of the tournament.

== Personal life ==
Vušković's great-grandfather Marko made three appearances for Hajduk Split on the liberated territory of Vis during World War II, and later worked as a club executive. Vušković's grandfather Mario, whom he was named after, attended the Hajduk academy in the 1970s and won a junior league title during Tomislav Ivić's tenure. Vušković's father Danijel is a former player who played as a defender. His brother, Luka and cousin, Moreno, are also professional players who play as defender and forward respectively.

He named Sergio Ramos as his football idol.

== Career statistics ==
=== Club ===
As of 9 November 2022

Club	Season	League			Cup (Note: Appearances in Croatian Cup)		Continental		Other		Total	
Club	Season	Division	Apps	Goals	Apps	Goals	Apps	Goals	Apps	Goals	Apps	Goals
Hajduk Split II	2018–19	Druga HNL	18	1	–		–		–		18	1
Hajduk Split II	2019–20	Druga HNL	1	0	–		–		–		1	0
Hajduk Split II	Total		19	1	–		–		–		19	1
Hajduk Split	2019–20	Prva HNL	10	1	1	0	0	0	–		11	1
Hajduk Split	2020–21	Prva HNL	29	2	2	0	2 (Note: Appearances in UEFA Europa League)	0	–		33	2
Hajduk Split	2021–22	Prva HNL	3	0	0	0	1 (Note: Appearances in UEFA Europa Conference League)	0	–		4	0
Hajduk Split	Total		42	3	3	0	3	0	–		48	3
Hamburg (loan)	2021–22	2. Bundesliga	24	1	3	0	—		2 (Note: Appearances in the promotion play-offs)	0	29	1
Hamburg	2022–23	2. Bundesliga	16	2	2	0	—		0	0	18	2
Hamburg	Total		40	3	5	0	–		2	0	47	3
Career total			101	7	8	0	3	0	2	0	114	7
