= Fábio Baldé =

Portuguese association football player (born 2005)

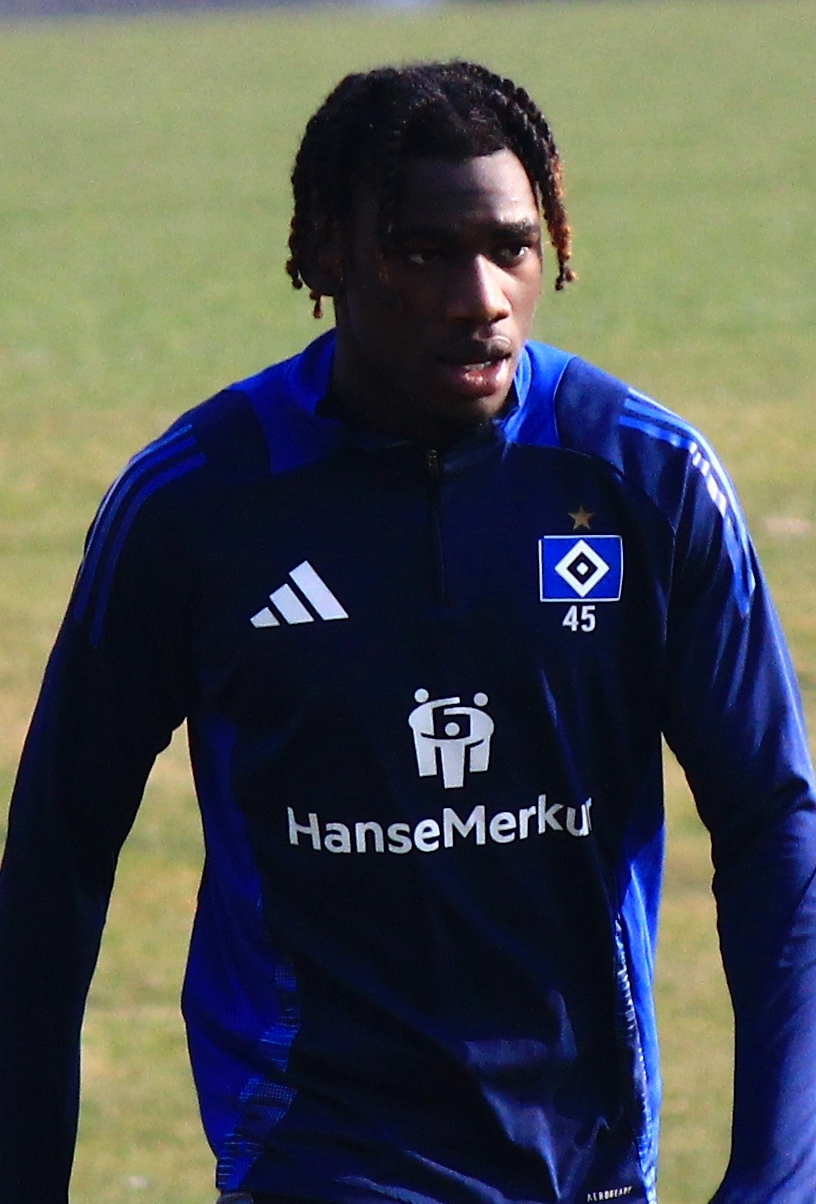
- Baldé in 2025

Personal information
- Full name: Fábio Amado Uri Baldé
- Date of birth: 20 July 2005 (age 21)
- Place of birth: Hamburg, Germany
- Height: 1.82 m (6 ft 0 in)
- Position: Left winger

Team information
- Current team: Strasbourg
- Number: 19

Youth career
- 2014–2018: ESV Einigkeit
- 2018–2019: FC Süderelbe
- 2019–2020: SC Vorwärts-Wacker 04
- 2020–2023: Hamburger SV

Senior career*
Years	Team	Apps	(Gls)
2023–2025	Hamburger SV II	22	(1)
2024–2026	Hamburger SV	38	(2)
2026–	Strasbourg	4	(0)

International career^{‡}
2024	Germany U20	4	(0)
2025–	Portugal U21	2	(1)
2026–	Portugal U20	6	(3)
- * Club domestic league appearances and goals as of 17 October 2026 ‡ National team caps and goals as of 21:17, 14 June 2026 (UTC)

Fábio Amado Uri Baldé (born 20 July 2005) is a professional footballer who plays as a left winger for Ligue 1 club Strasbourg. Born in Germany, he currently plays for the Portugal U21s.

== Club career ==
Baldé is a product of the youth academies of ESV Einigkeit, FC Süderelbe, and SC Vorwärts-Wacker 04, before joining Hamburger SVs youth academy in 2020. In 2023 he was named captain of their U19 team, before promoting to their reserves in the Regionalliga. In January 2024, he started training with Hamburg's senior team. He made his senior debut with Hamburg in a 2–1 2. Bundesliga win over 1. FC Köln on 2 August 2024. On 10 September 2024, he signed a long-term contract with Hamburg until 2029.

On 14 August 2026, Baldé signed a five-year contract with Ligue 1 side Strasbourg.

== International career ==
Baldé was born in Germany to a Bissau-Guinean father and Portuguese-French mother. Baldé holds both Portuguese and French citizenship from his parents. He only held a Portuguese passport until the age of 19, gaining German citizenship in October 2024. That same month he was called up to the Germany U20s for a set of friendlies. In September 2025, he was called up to the Portugal U21s for a set of 2027 UEFA European Under-21 Championship qualification matches.

== Career statistics ==
As of match played 17 October 2026

Appearances and goals by club, season and competition
Club	Season	League			DFB-Pokal		Europe		Other		Total	
Club	Season	Division	Apps	Goals	Apps	Goals	Apps	Goals	Apps	Goals	Apps	Goals
Hamburger SV II	2023–24	Regionalliga Nord	19	0	—		—		—		19	0
Hamburger SV II	2024–25	Regionalliga Nord	3	1	—		—		—		3	1
Hamburger SV II	Total		22	1	—		—		—		22	1
Hamburger SV	2024–25	2. Bundesliga	22	1	2	1	—		—		24	2
Hamburger SV	2025–26	Bundesliga	16	1	1	0	—		0	0	17	1
Hamburger SV	Total		38	2	3	1	—		0	0	41	3
Strasboourg	2026–27	Ligue 1	4	0	0	0	—		—		4	0
Career total			64	3	3	1	0	0	0	0	67	4
