= Aboubaka Soumahoro =

French footballer (born 2005)

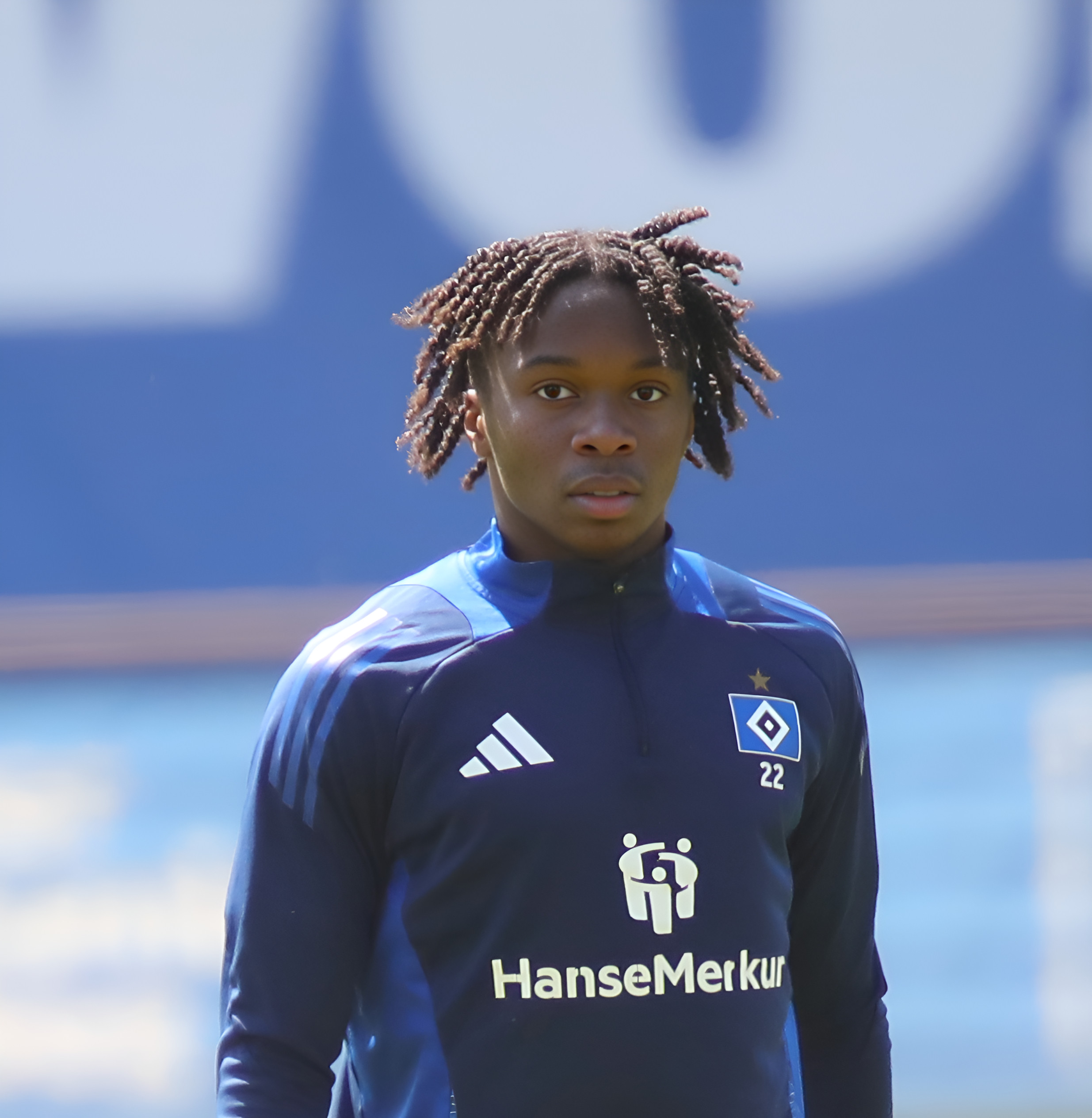
- Aboubaka Soumahoro in 2025

Personal information
- Date of birth: 4 February 2005 (age 21)
- Place of birth: Paris, France
- Height: 1.84 m (6 ft 0 in)
- Position: Defender

Team information
- Current team: Mallorca (on loan from Hamburger SV)
- Number: 22

Youth career
- 2014–2015: Chantiers Paris UA
- 2015–2019: VGA Saint-Maur
- 2019–2021: Paris Saint-Germain
- Paris FC

Senior career*
Years	Team	Apps	(Gls)
2022–2023	Paris FC II	14	(1)
2023–2025	Paris FC	14	(0)
2025–	Hamburger SV	4	(0)
2025–	Hamburger SV II	1	(0)
2026	→ Saint-Étienne (loan)	0	(0)
2026–	→ Mallorca (loan)	6	(0)

International career^{‡}
2023–2024	France U19	7	(1)
2024–2025	France U20	8	(1)
Medal record
Men's football
Representing France
UEFA European Under-19 Championship
Runner-up	2024 Northern Ireland
- * Club domestic league appearances and goals as of 4 October 2026 ‡ National team caps and goals as of 7 September 2025

Aboubaka Soumahoro (born 4 February 2005) is a French footballer who plays as a defender for Segunda División club Mallorca, on loan from Bundesliga club Hamburger SV.

== Club career ==
On 3 February 2025, Soumahoro signed a long-term contract with Hamburger SV in German 2. Bundesliga. On 2 February 2026, he returned to France and joined Saint-Étienne in Ligue 2 on loan with an option to buy.

On 10 July 2026, Soumahoro moved on a new loan to Mallorca in Spain's Segunda División.

== Personal life ==
Born in France, Soumahoro is of Ivorian descent.

== Career statistics ==
As of match played 4 October 2026

Appearances and goals by club, season and competition
Club	Season	League			Cup		Europe		Other		Total	
Club	Season	League	Apps	Goals	Apps	Goals	Apps	Goals	Apps	Goals	Apps	Goals
Paris FC II	2022–23	National 3	14	1	—		—		—		14	1
Paris FC	2024–25	Ligue 2	14	0	0	0	—		—		14	0
Hamburger SV	2025–26	Bundesliga	4	0	1	0	—		—		5	0
Mallorca (loan)	2026–27	Segunda División	6	0	0	0	—		—		6	0
Career total			38	1	1	0	0	0	0	0	39	1

== Honours ==
France U19

- UEFA European Under-19 Championship runner-up: 2024
