= 2025–26 Hamburger SV season =

Hamburger SV
2025–26 season
- Owner: HSV e.V.
- Head coach: Merlin Polzin
- Stadium: Volksparkstadion
- Bundesliga: 13th
- DFB-Pokal: Round of 16
- Top goalscorer: League: Fábio Vieira (7); All: Fábio Vieira (7)
- Highest home attendance: 57,000
- Lowest home attendance: 57,000
- Average home league attendance: 57,000
- Biggest win: Hamburger SV 4–0 Mainz 05 (5 October 2025)
- Biggest defeat: Bayern Munich 5–0 Hamburger SV (13 September 2025)
Home colours	Away colours	Third colours

The 2025–26 season was the 138th season in the history of Hamburger SV, and the club's first season back in the Bundesliga since being relegated for the first time in 2018. In addition to the domestic league, the club participated in the DFB-Pokal.

== Coaching staff ==
Position	Staff
Head coach	(Germany) Merlin Polzin
Assistant coach	(Germany) Loic Fave
Assistant coach	(Germany) Richard Krohn
Goalkeeper coach	(Germany) Sven Höh
Fitness coach	(Germany) Jan Hasenkamp
Rehab coach	(Germany) Sebastian Capel
Match analyst	(Germany) Eduard Riesen

Source: Hamburger SV

== Players ==
=== First team ===
No.	Player	Nat.	Positions	Date of birth (age)	Place of birth	Signed in	Contract ends	Signed from	Transfer fee	Apps.	Goals
Goalkeepers
1	Daniel Heuer Fernandes	(Portugal)	GK	13 November 1992 (age 33)	(Germany) Bochum	2019	2026	(Germany) Darmstadt 98	€1.3M	174	0
40	Hannes Hermann (U21)	(Germany)	GK	23 March 2005 (age 21)	(Germany) Hamburg	2024	2027	Academy		0	0
41	Fernando Dickes (U19)	(Germany)	GK	13 October 2007 (age 19)	(Germany) Halle (Saale)	2025	2028	(Germany) RB Leipzig	Free	0	0
Defenders
2	William Mikelbrencis	(Germany)	RB	25 February 2004 (age 22)	(France) Forbach	2022	2026	(France) Metz	€700k	61	0
16	Giorgi Gocholeishvili	(Georgia (country))	RB	14 February 2001 (age 25)	(Georgia (country)) Kutaisi	2025	2026	(Ukraine) Shakhtar Donetsk	Loan	24	0
17	Warmed Omari	(Comoros)	CB	23 April 2000 (age 26)	(France) Bandraboua	2026	2030	(France) Rennes	€2M	14	0
25	Jordan Torunarigha	(Nigeria)	CB	7 August 1997 (age 29)	(Germany) Chemnitz	2025	2028	(Belgium) Gent	Free	24	0
28	Miro Muheim	(Switzerland)	LB	24 March 1998 (age 28)	(Switzerland) Zürich	2022	2027	(Switzerland) St. Gallen	€1.5M	120	8
39	Joel Agyekum (U21)	(Germany)	CB	8 March 2005 (age 21)	(Germany) Hamburg	2025	–	Hamburger SV II		0	0
44	Luka Vušković (U21)	(Croatia)	CB	8 March 2005 (age 21)	(Croatia) Split	2025	2026	Tottenham Hotspur	Loan	18	4
Midfielders
6	Albert Sambi Lokonga	(Belgium)	CM	22 October 1999 (age 26)	(Belgium) Verviers	2025	2028	(England) Arsenal	€300k	26	5
8	Daniel Elfadli	(Libya)	DM	6 April 1997 (age 29)	(Germany) Leonberg	2024	–	(Germany) 1. FC Magdeburg	€800k	52	3
18	Bakery Jatta (HG)	(The Gambia)	RW	6 June 1998 (age 28)	(The Gambia) Gunjur	2016	2029	N/A	Undisclosed	210	26
20	Fábio Vieira	(Portugal)	AM	30 May 2000 (age 26)	(Portugal) Santa Maria da Feira	2025	2026	(England) Arsenal	Loan	29	7
21	Nicolai Remberg	(Germany)	CM	19 June 2000 (age 26)	(Germany) Rheine	2025	2028	(Germany) Holstein Kiel	€2.1M	19	0
24	Nicolás Capaldo	(Argentina)	CM	14 September 1998 (age 28)	(Argentina) Santa Rosa, La Pampa	2025	2028	(Austria) Red Bull Salzburg	€4.5M	32	0
48	Bilal Yalcinkaya (U21)	(Germany)	AM	30 March 2006 (age 20)	(Germany) Hamburg	2024	2027	Hamburger SV II		0	0
	Levin Öztunalı (HG, AT)	(Germany)	LW / LW / AM	15 March 1996 (age 30)	(Germany) Hamburg	2023	2026	(Germany) Union Berlin	Free	21	0
Forwards
7	Jean-Luc Dompé	(France)	LW / RW	12 August 1995 (age 31)	(France) Arpajon	2022	2027	(Belgium) Zulte Waregem	€1.1M	107	18
9	Robert Glatzel (HG)	(Germany)	ST	8 January 1994 (age 32)	(Germany) Fürstenfeldbruck	2021	2027	(England) Cardiff City	€1M	134	76
11	Ransford-Yeboah Königsdörffer (HG, AT)	(Ghana)	RW	13 September 2001 (age 25)	(Germany) Berlin	2022	2026	(Germany) Dynamo Dresden	€1.4M	125	29
14	Rayan Philippe	(France)	ST	23 October 2000 (age 25)	(France) Nice	2025	2029	(Germany) Eintracht Braunschweig	€2.5M	28	5
15	Yussuf Poulsen	(Denmark)	ST	15 June 1994 (age 32)	(Denmark) Copenhagen	2025	2027	(Germany) RB Leipzig	€1M	15	1
19	Damion Downs	(United States)	ST	6 July 2004 (age 22)	(Germany) Werneck	2026		(England) Southampton	Loan	12	0
27	Philip Otele	(Nigeria)	LW	15 April 1999 (age 27)	Nigeria	2026		(Switzerland) Basel	Loan	9	1
38	Alexander Røssing-Lelesiit (U19)	(Norway)	ST	20 January 2007 (age 19)	Norway	2025	2029	(Norway) Lillestrøm	€2.8	13	0
45	Fabio Baldé (U21)	(Portugal)	LW / RW	20 July 2005 (age 21)	(Germany) Hamburg	2024	2029	Hamburger SV II		38	2
49	Otto Stange (U21)	(Germany)	ST	19 February 2007 (age 19)	(Germany) Hamburg	2024	–	Hamburger SV II		23	2
Players who left on loan
6	Łukasz Poręba	(Poland)	CM / AM / DM	13 March 2000 (age 26)	(Poland) Legnica	2024	2027	(France) Lens	€750k	17	1

Notes:

- Player (HG) – Player who fulfils the Premier League's "Home Grown Player" criteria.
- Player (U21) – Player who fulfils the Premier League's under-21 player criteria.
- Player (CT) – Player who fulfils UEFA's "club-trained player" criteria.
- Player (AT) – Player who fulfils UEFA's "association-trained player" criteria.
- Player (B) – Player who fulfils UEFA's "List B" criteria.

== Transfers ==
=== In ===
==== Summer ====
Date	Pos.	Player	From	Fee	Ref.
30 June 2025	DF	(Portugal) Guilherme Ramos	(Portugal) Santa Clara	Loan return	
1 July 2025	DF	(Nigeria) Jordan Torunarigha	(Belgium) Gent	Free transfer	
1 July 2025	GK	(Germany) Fernando Dickes	(Germany) RB Leipzig	Free transfer	
1 July 2025	MF	(Germany) Nicolai Remberg	(Germany) Holstein Kiel	€2,100,000	
2 July 2025	FW	(France) Rayan Philippe	(Germany) Eintracht Braunschweig	€2,500,000	
10 July 2025	MF	(Argentina) Nicolás Capaldo	(Austria) Red Bull Salzburg	€4,500,000	
13 July 2025	FW	(Denmark) Yussuf Poulsen	(Germany) RB Leipzig	€1,000,000	
21 July 2025	GK	(Israel) Daniel Peretz	(Germany) Bayern Munich	Loan (€250,000)	
7 August 2025	DF	(Comoros) Warmed Omari	(France) Rennes	Loan	
7 August 2025	DF	(Georgia (country)) Giorgi Gocholeishvili	(Ukraine) Shakhtar Donetsk	Loan (€250,000)	
29 August 2025	DF	(Croatia) Luka Vušković	(England) Tottenham Hotspur	Loan	
1 September 2025	MF	(Belgium) Albert Sambi Lokonga	(England) Arsenal	€300,000	
1 September 2025	MF	(Portugal) Fábio Vieira	(England) Arsenal	Loan	

==== Winter ====
Date	Pos.	Player	From	Fee	Ref.
7 January 2026	FW	(United States) Damion Downs	(England) Southampton	Loan	
22 January 2026	GK	(Norway) Sander Tangvik	(Norway) Rosenborg	Free transfer	
31 January 2026	MF	(Denmark) Albert Grønbæk	(France) Rennes	Loan	
2 February 2026	DF	(Comoros) Warmed Omari	(France) Rennes	€2,000,000	
2 February 2026	FW	(Nigeria) Philip Otele	(Switzerland) Basel	Loan	

=== Out ===
==== Summer ====
Date	Pos.	Player	To	Fee	Ref.
1 July 2025	GK	(Germany) Tom Mickel	Retired		
1 July 2025	MF	(Netherlands) Ludovit Reis	(Belgium) Club Brugge	€7,000,000	
1 July 2025	FW	(Hungary) András Németh	(Hungary) Puskás Akadémia	€450,000	
1 July 2025	DF	(Germany) Valon Zumberi	(Netherlands) Vitesse	Free transfer	
1 July 2025	FW	(Germany) Tom Sanne	(Germany) Wacker Burghausen	Undisclosed	
1 July 2025	FW	(Germany) Davie Selke	(Turkey) İstanbul Başakşehir	End of contract	
3 July 2025	DF	(Germany) Nicolas Oliveira	(Germany) Jahn Regensburg	Free transfer	
7 July 2025	DF	(France) Lucas Perrin	(Spain) Sporting Gijón	Free transfer	
11 July 2025	GK	(Germany) Matheo Raab	(Germany) Union Berlin	€400,000	
22 July 2025	MF	(Finland) Anssi Suhonen	(Sweden) Östers IF	Loan	
30 July 2025	MF	(Poland) Łukasz Poręba	(Germany) SV Elversberg	Loan	
1 September 2025	FW	(Germany) Otto Stange	(Germany) SV Elversberg	Loan	
1 September 2025	DF	(Germany) Joel Agyekum	(Germany) Viktoria Köln	Loan	

==== Winter ====
Date	Pos.	Player	To	Fee	Ref.
3 January 2026	MF	(Germany) Jonas Meffert	(Germany) Holstein Kiel	€250,000	
17 January 2026	MF	(Finland) Anssi Suhonen	(Denmark) OB	€20,000	
29 January 2026	DF	(Switzerland) Silvan Hefti	(United States) D.C. United	€150,000	
30 January 2026	FW	(Kosovo) Emir Sahiti	(Israel) Maccabi Tel Aviv	Loan	
31 January 2026	DF	(Portugal) Guilherme Ramos	(China) Beijing Guoan	€100,000	
2 February 2026	MF	(Suriname) Immanuel Pherai	(Germany) SV Elversberg	Loan	
2 February 2026	DF	(France) Aboubaka Soumahoro	(France) Saint-Étienne	Loan	

== Pre-season and friendlies ==
On 6 June 2025, Hamburg announced the scheduling of four friendlies on 6, 12, 19 July and 9 August. Preparation for the season started on 30 June. The club held a training camp from 1 to 3 July at the Adidas Homeground.

6 July 2025 Friendly	VfB Oldenburg	1–2	Hamburger SV	Oldenburg
15:30 CEST (UTC+2)	Facklam 19'		Dompé 71'; Ramos 86'	Stadium: Marschweg-Stadion

12 July 2025 Friendly	Copenhagen	1–0	Hamburger SV	Copenhagen, Denmark
16:00 CEST (UTC+2)	Larsson 10'	Report		Stadium: Parken Stadium; Attendance: 23,132; Referee: Jakob Sundberg

19 July 2025 Friendly	Sturm Graz	2–1	Hamburger SV	Graz, Austria
16:00 CEST (UTC+2)	Stanković 18'; Chukwuani 45+2'	Report	Glatzel 90'	Stadium: Liebenauer Stadium; Attendance: 9,272

26 July 2025 Friendly	Hamburger SV	0–4	Lyon	Hamburg
15:00 CEST (UTC+2)	Remberg (yellow card) 57'	Report	Fofana 11'; Maitland-Niles 31'; Mikautadze 39'; Moreira 95'	Stadium: Volksparkstadion; Attendance: 45,757; Referee: Jarno Wienefeld
Note: Match was 120 minutes long.

9 August 2025 Friendly	Mallorca	2–0	Hamburger SV	Palma, Spain
20:00 CEST (UTC+2)	Asano 13'; Muheim 59' (o.g.)	Report		Stadium: Estadi Mallorca Son Moix; Attendance: 11,150; Referee: Mateo Busquets Ferrer

== Competitions ==
=== Overall record ===
Competition	First match	Last match	Starting round	Final position	Record							
Competition	First match	Last match	Starting round	Final position	Pld	W	D	L	GF	GA	GD	Win %
Bundesliga	24 August 2025	16 May 2026	Matchday 1	13th	34	9	11	14	40	54	−14	26.47
DFB-Pokal	16 August 2025	3 December 2025	First round	Round of 16	3	2	1	0	4	2	+2	66.67
Total					37	11	12	14	44	56	−12	29.73

Source: Soccerway

=== Bundesliga ===
==== League table ====
Pos	Team	Pld	W	D	L	GF	GA	GD	Pts
11	Union Berlin	34	10	9	15	44	58	−14	39
12	Borussia Mönchengladbach	34	9	11	14	42	53	−11	38
13	Hamburger SV	34	9	11	14	40	54	−14	38
14	1. FC Köln	34	7	11	16	49	63	−14	32
15	Werder Bremen	34	8	8	18	37	60	−23	32

Source: Bundesliga
Rules for classification: 1) Points; 2) Goal difference; 3) Goals scored; 4) Head-to-head results; 5) Head-to-head away goals scored; 6) Away goals scored; 7) Play-off.
(Rules 4–6 only apply after home and away matches have been played between the tied teams.)

==== Results summary ====
Overall								Home						Away					
Pld	W	D	L	GF	GA	GD	Pts	W	D	L	GF	GA	GD	W	D	L	GF	GA	GD
34	9	11	14	40	54	−14	38	6	6	5	25	22	+3	3	5	9	15	32	−17

Source: Bundesliga

==== Results by round ====
Round	1	2	3	4	5	6	7	8	9	10	11	12	13	14	15	16	17	18	19	20	21	22	23	24	25	26	27	28	29	30	31	32	33	34
Ground	A	H	A	H	A	H	A	H	A	H	A	H	H	A	H	A	H	H	A	H	A	H	A	H	A	H	A	H	A	A	H	A	H	A
Result	D	L	L	W	D	W	L	L	L	D	L	W	W	L	D	L	D	D	D	W	W	D	L	L	W	D	L	D	L	L	L	W	W	D
Position	11	15	15	15	13	9	13	13	13	13	14	13	13	14	13	14	14	14	13	11	9	11	11	11	10	11	12	12	12	14	15	12	11	13

Source: Bundesliga
A = Away; H = Home; W = Win; D = Draw; L = Loss

==== Matches ====
The match schedule was released on 27 June 2025.

24 August 2025 1	Borussia Mönchengladbach	0–0	Hamburger SV	Mönchengladbach
17:30 CEST (UTC+2)	Reitz (yellow card) 34'; Scally (yellow card) 85'	Report	Capaldo (yellow card) 59'	Stadium: Borussia-Park; Attendance: 54,042; Referee: Sascha Stegemann

29 August 2025 2	Hamburger SV	0–2	FC St. Pauli	Hamburg
20:30 CEST (UTC+2)	Gocholeishvili (yellow card) 26' (yellow-red card) 77'; Poulsen (yellow card) 64'	Report	Dźwigała (yellow card) 7', (goal) 19'; Sinani (yellow card) 37'; Pyrka (yellow card) 54'; Hountondji 60'	Stadium: Volksparkstadion; Attendance: 57,000; Referee: Christian Dingert

13 September 2025 3	Bayern Munich	5–0	Hamburger SV	Munich
18:30 CEST (UTC+2)	Gnabry 3'; Pavlović 9', (yellow card) 90+1'; Kane 26' (pen.), 62'; Upamecano (yellow card) 27'; Díaz 29'	Report	Soumahoro (yellow card) 1'; Muheim (yellow card) 86'	Stadium: Allianz Arena; Attendance: 75,000; Referee: Tobias Stieler

20 September 2025 4	Hamburger SV	2–1	1. FC Heidenheim	Hamburg
15:30 CEST (UTC+2)	Elfadli (yellow card) 22'; Vušković 42'; Philippe (yellow card) 56', (goal) 59'; Vieira (yellow card) 64'; Remberg (yellow card) 72'; Heuer Fernandes (yellow card) 90+3'	Report	Kölle (yellow card) 80', (goal) 90+3'	Stadium: Volksparkstadion; Attendance: 57,000; Referee: Florian Exner

28 September 2025 5	Union Berlin	0–0	Hamburger SV	Berlin
19:30 CEST (UTC+2)	Ilić (penalty missed) 10'; Querfeld (yellow card) 79'; Trimmel (yellow card) 90+1'	Report	Muheim (yellow card) 38'; Philippe (yellow card) 71'; Vieira (red card) 90+8'	Stadium: Stadion An der Alten Försterei; Attendance: 22,012; Referee: Deniz Aytekin

5 October 2025 6	Hamburger SV	4–0	Mainz 05	Hamburg
17:30 CEST (UTC+2)	Sambi Lokonga 6'; Philippe 10', 61'; Elfadli (yellow card) 17'; Dompé 52'; Remberg (yellow card) 65'	Report	Lee (yellow card) 42'; Kohr (yellow card) 45+3'; Amiri (yellow card) 65'	Stadium: Volksparkstadion; Attendance: 57,000; Referee: Robert Hartmann

18 October 2025 7	RB Leipzig	2–1	Hamburger SV	Leipzig
15:30 CEST (UTC+2)	Baumgartner (yellow card) 43', (goal) 45', 50'; Diomande (yellow card) 79'; Harder (yellow card) 90+5'	Report	Capaldo (yellow card) 18'; Sambi Lokonga 48'	Stadium: Red Bull Arena; Attendance: 47,800; Referee: Tobias Welz

25 October 2025 8	Hamburger SV	0–1	VfL Wolfsburg	Hamburg
15:30 CEST (UTC+2)	Königsdörffer (penalty missed) 45+1'; Vušković (yellow card) 70'	Report	Daghim 15'; Souza (yellow card) 24'; Amoura (yellow card) 28'; Wind (yellow card) 67'; Svanberg (yellow card) 70'; Wimmer (yellow card) 90'	Stadium: Volksparkstadion; Attendance: 57,000; Referee: Martin Petersen

2 November 2025 9	1. FC Köln	4–1	Hamburger SV	Cologne
15:30 CET (UTC+1)	Ache 25'; Kainz 48'; Bülter (yellow card) 78'; El Mala 90+4'; Kamiński 90+9'	Report	Remberg (yellow card) 10'; Dompé 61'; Vieira (yellow card) 74' (yellow-red card); Pherai (yellow card) 78' (yellow-red card); Poulsen (yellow card) 79'	Stadium: RheinEnergieStadion; Attendance: 50,000; Referee: Daniel Schlager

8 November 2025 10	Hamburger SV	1–1	Borussia Dortmund	Hamburg
15:30 CET (UTC+1)	Poulsen (yellow card) 12'; Königsdörffer 90+7'	Report	Chukwuemeka 64'; Adeyemi (yellow card) 90+4'	Stadium: Volksparkstadion; Attendance: 57,000; Referee: Tobias Reichel

22 November 2025 11	FC Augsburg	1–0	Hamburger SV	Augsburg
15:30 CET (UTC+1)	Kade 76'; Schlotterbeck (yellow card) 34' (yellow-red card) 81'	Report	Vušković (yellow card) 84'; Remberg (yellow card) 61'; Capaldo (yellow card) 38'	Stadium: Augsburg Arena; Attendance: 30,660; Referee: Robin Braun

30 November 2025 12	Hamburger SV	2–1	VfB Stuttgart	Hamburg
15:30 CET (UTC+1)	Glatzel 17'; Røssing (yellow card) 65' (yellow-red card) 81'; Vieira 90+4'	Report	Stenzel (yellow card) 23'; Undav 54', (yellow card) 81'; Andrés (yellow card) 74'; Vagnoman (yellow card) 87'	Stadium: Volksparkstadion; Attendance: 57,000; Referee: Sören Storks

7 December 2025 13	Hamburger SV	3–2	Werder Bremen	Hamburg
15:30 CET (UTC+1)	Vušković (yellow card) 56', (goal) 75'; Sambi Lokonga 63'; Poulsen 84'; Remberg (yellow card) 90+7'	Report	Stage (yellow card) 32', (goal) 45'; Topp (yellow card) 62'; Grüll (yellow card) 69'; Friedl (yellow card) 74'; Njinmah 78'; Coulibaly (yellow card) 90+4'; Schmid (yellow card) 90+5'	Stadium: Volksparkstadion; Attendance: 56,100; Referee: Sascha Stegemann

13 December 2025 14	TSG Hoffenheim	4–1	Hamburger SV	Sinsheim
15:30 CET (UTC+1)	Prömel 8', (yellow card) 74'; Kabak 31'; Lemperle 65'; Asllani 72'	Report	Königsdörffer (yellow card) 29'; Capaldo (yellow card) 65'; Sambi Lokonga (yellow card) 77'; Philippe 82', (penalty missed) 90+1'	Stadium: Rhein-Neckar-Arena; Attendance: 30,150; Referee: Martin Petersen

20 December 2025 15	Hamburger SV	1–1	Eintracht Frankfurt	Hamburg
15:30 CET (UTC+1)	Sambi Lokonga 19'	Report	Larsson 26'	Stadium: Volksparkstadion; Attendance: 57,000; Referee: Tobias Stieler

10 January 2026 16	SC Freiburg	2–1	Hamburger SV	Freiburg
15:30 CET (UTC+1)	Treu (yellow card) 39'; Lienhart (yellow card) 43'; Grifo 53' (pen.); Matanović 83'; Oesterhage (yellow card) 90+7'	Report	Elfadli (yellow card) 4' (yellow-red card) 51'; Vušković 48', (yellow card) 63'; Heuer Fernandes (yellow card) 77'; Røssing-Lelesiit (yellow card) 90+12'	Stadium: Europa-Park Stadion; Attendance: 34,700; Referee: Timo Gerach

17 January 2026 18	Hamburger SV	0–0	Borussia Mönchengladbach	Hamburg
15:30 CET (UTC+1)	Torunarigha (yellow card) 80'	Report	Engelhardt (yellow card) 42'; Diks (yellow card) 59'	Stadium: Volksparkstadion; Attendance: 57,000; Referee: Robert Schröder

23 January 2026 19	FC St. Pauli	0–0	Hamburger SV	St. Pauli
20:30 CET (UTC+1)	Dźwigała (yellow card) 7'	Report	Remberg (yellow card) 24'	Stadium: Millerntor-Stadion; Attendance: 29,546; Referee: Tobias Welz

31 January 2026 20	Hamburger SV	2–2	Bayern Munich	Hamburg
18:30 CET (UTC+1)	Remberg (yellow card) 23'; Vieira 34' (pen.); Vušković 53'; Muheim (yellow card) 55'; Sambi Lokonga (yellow card) 75'; Gocholeishvili (yellow card) 85'; Heuer Fernandes (yellow card) 90+3'; Capaldo (yellow card) 90+10'	Report	Kim (yellow card) 57'; Kane (yellow card) 87'; Olise (yellow card) 90+5'; Kimmich (yellow card) 90+10'	Stadium: Volksparkstadion; Attendance: 57,000; Referee: Harm Osmers

7 February 2026 21	1. FC Heidenheim	0–2	Hamburger SV	Heidenheim
15:30 CET (UTC+1)		Report	Elfadli (yellow card) 7'; Königsdörffer 45+3'; Philippe 78'; Mikelbrencis (yellow card) 88'	Stadium: Voith-Arena; Attendance: 15,000; Referee: Daniel Siebert

14 February 2026 22	Hamburger SV	3–2	Union Berlin	Hamburg
15:30 CET (UTC+1)	Königsdörffer 35', 82'; Capaldo 45+2', (yellow card) 64'; Vušković (yellow card) 50'; Mikelbrencis (yellow card) 90+7'	Report	Querfeld 28' (pen.); Ilić 89'	Stadium: Volksparkstadion; Attendance: 57,000; Referee: Florian Badstübner

20 February 2026 23	Mainz 05	1–1	Hamburger SV	Mainz
20:30 CET (UTC+1)	Silas (yellow card) 12'; Amiri 42'; Kohr (yellow card) 45+1'; Potulski (yellow card) 90'	Report	Muheim (yellow card) 34'; Remberg (yellow card) 58'; Vieira 64'	Stadium: Mewa Arena; Attendance: 33,305; Referee: Robin Braun

1 March 2026 24	Hamburger SV	1–2	RB Leipzig	Hamburg
19:30 CET (UTC+1)	Vieira 22'; Otele (yellow card) 45+3'; Muheim (yellow card) 81'; Poulsen (yellow card) 82'	Report	Orbán (yellow card) 31'; Rômulo 36', (penalty missed) 63', (yellow card) 63'; Diomande 50'	Stadium: Volksparkstadion; Attendance: 57,000; Referee: Bastian Dankert

4 March 2026 17	Hamburger SV	0–1	Bayer Leverkusen	Hamburg
20:30 CET (UTC+1)		Report	García (yellow card) 40'; Kofane 73'; Palacios (yellow card) 90+5'	Stadium: Volksparkstadion; Attendance: 57,000; Referee: Sören Storks
Note: The match was originally scheduled for 13 January 2026, but was postponed due to weather-related safety concerns.

7 March 2026 25	VfL Wolfsburg	1–2	Hamburger SV	Wolfsburg
15:30 CET (UTC+1)	Eriksen 22' (pen.); Jenz (yellow card) 32'; Lindstrøm (yellow card) 45'; Adjetey (yellow card) 57'; Müller (red card) 90+9'	Report	Elfadli (yellow card) 20'; Vušković 33' (pen.); Dompé 58' (pen.); Vieira (yellow card) 90+6'	Stadium: Volkswagen Arena; Attendance: 28,917; Referee: Florian Exner

14 March 2026 26	Hamburger SV	1–1	1. FC Köln	Hamburg
18:30 CET (UTC+1)	Vieira 39'; Remberg (yellow card) 41'; Muheim (yellow card) 90+6'	Report	El Mala (yellow card) 32', (goal) 45'; Hansen (yellow card) 36'; Kamiński (yellow card) 76'; Sebulonsen (yellow card) 90+8'	Stadium: Volksparkstadion; Attendance: 57,000; Referee: Tobias Welz

21 March 2026 27	Borussia Dortmund	3–2	Hamburger SV	Dortmund
18:30 CET (UTC+1)	Nmecha (penalty missed) 45'; Adeyemi (yellow card) 45+4'; Bensebaini 73' (pen.), 84' (pen.); Guirassy 78'; Ryerson (yellow card) 90+4'	Report	Otele 19', (yellow card) 68'; Sambi Lokonga 38'; Remberg (yellow card) 45+4'; Mikelbrencis (yellow card) 72'	Stadium: Westfalenstadion; Attendance: 81,365; Referee: Matthias Jöllenbeck

4 April 2026 28	Hamburger SV	1–1	FC Augsburg	Hamburg
15:30 CEST (UTC+2)	Otele (yellow card) 41'; Torunarigha (yellow card) 55'; Königsdörffer 60'; Muheim (red card) 64'	Report	Chaves 22'; Rieder (yellow card) 59'; Zesiger (yellow card) 81'; Schlotterbeck (yellow card) 87'	Stadium: Volksparkstadion; Attendance: 57,000; Referee: Deniz Aytekin

12 April 2026 29	VfB Stuttgart	4–0	Hamburger SV	Stuttgart
17:30 CEST (UTC+2)	Stiller 21'; Andrés (yellow card) 24'; Führich 32'; Mittelstädt 56'; Undav (yellow card) 80', (penalty missed) 82'; El Khannouss 86'	Report	Capaldo (yellow card) 80'	Stadium: MHPArena; Attendance: 60,000; Referee: Sven Jablonski

18 April 2026 30	Werder Bremen	3–1	Hamburger SV	Bremen
15:30 CEST (UTC+2)	Stage 37', 57'; Deman (yellow card) 45'; Sugawara (yellow card) 71'; Bittencourt (yellow card) 73'; Grüll (yellow card) 82'; Puertas 90+1'	Report	Glatzel 41'; Königsdörffer (yellow card) 45'; Muheim (yellow card) 58'; Otele (red card) 79'; Jatta (yellow card) 89'	Stadium: Weserstadion; Attendance: 41,800; Referee: Florian Exner

25 April 2026 31	Hamburger SV	1–2	TSG Hoffenheim	Hamburg
18:30 CEST (UTC+2)	Glatzel 34' (pen.); Remberg (yellow card) 49'; Sambi Lokonga (yellow card) 90+2'	Report	Hranáč (yellow card) 8'; Asllani 18'; Baumann (yellow card) 32'; Lemperle 45'; Prömel (yellow card) 68'; Burger (yellow card) 71'	Stadium: Volksparkstadion; Attendance: 57,000; Referee: Robert Schröder

2 May 2026 32	Eintracht Frankfurt	1–2	Hamburger SV	Frankfurt
15:30 CEST (UTC+2)	Uzun 48', (yellow card) 88'; Højlund (yellow card) 52'; Kristensen (yellow card) 71'; Kalimuendo (yellow card) 85'; Bahoya (yellow card) 90+10' (yellow-red card) 90+12'	Report	Grønbæk 51'; Vieira 59'; Capaldo (yellow card) 88'	Stadium: Waldstadion; Attendance: 59,500; Referee: Deniz Aytekin

10 May 2026 33	Hamburger SV	3–2	SC Freiburg	Hamburg
15:30 CEST (UTC+2)	Jatta 14'; Vušković 64', (yellow card) 65'; Baldé 67'; Capaldo (yellow card) 86'	Report	Matanović 16', 87'; Kübler (yellow card) 20'; Höler (yellow card) 86'	Stadium: Volksparkstadion; Attendance: 57,000; Referee: Felix Zwayer

16 May 2026 34	Bayer Leverkusen	1–1	Hamburger SV	Leverkusen
15:30 CEST (UTC+2)	Schick (penalty missed) 25'; Arthur (yellow card) 66'; Quansah 78'	Report	Torunarigha (yellow card) 24'; Vieira 61'; Capaldo (yellow card) 78'	Stadium: BayArena; Attendance: 30,210; Referee: Tobias Stieler

=== DFB-Pokal ===
16 August 2025 First round	FK Pirmasens	1–2 (a.e.t.)	Hamburger SV	Pirmasens
13:00 CEST (UTC+2)	Andreas (yellow card) 11'; Grieß 52'; Büchler (yellow card) 71'; Grünnagel (yellow card) 86'; Deho (yellow card) 98'; Wiltz (yellow card) 99'; Müller (yellow card) 110'	Report	Torunarigha (yellow card) 63'; Ramos 90+2'; Königsdörffer 100'	Stadium: Sportpark Husterhöhe; Attendance: 10,000; Referee: Timo Gansloweit

28 October 2025 Second round	1. FC Heidenheim	0–1	Hamburger SV	Heidenheim
18:30 CET (UTC+1)	Niehues (yellow card) 35'; Siersleben (red card) 44'; Dorsch (yellow card) 80'; Ramaj (yellow card) 83'; Ibrahimović (yellow card) 84'; Schöppner (yellow card) 90+7'	Report	Remberg (yellow card) 45'; Glatzel 83' (pen.)	Stadium: Voith-Arena; Attendance: 15,000; Referee: Benjamin Brand

3 December 2025 Round of 16	Hamburger SV	1–1 (a.e.t.) (2–4 p)	Holstein Kiel	Hamburg
20:45 CET (UTC+1)	Remberg (yellow card) 12'; Torunarigha (yellow card) 85'; Meffert (yellow card) 100'; Jatta 107'	Report	Davidsen (yellow card) 9'; Rosenboom (yellow card) 12'; Zec (yellow card) 54'; Ivezić (yellow card) 69'; Nekić (yellow card) 87'; Tolkin (yellow card) 90'; Harres 118'	Stadium: Volksparkstadion; Attendance: 57,000; Referee: Tobias Welz
	Penalties
	Philippe (penalty scored); Vieira (penalty scored); Muheim (penalty missed); Soumahoro (penalty missed)		(penalty scored) Zec; (penalty missed) Ivezić; (penalty scored) Schwab; (penalty scored) Nekić; (penalty scored) Harres

== Statistics ==
=== Appearances ===
No.	Pos.	Player	Bundesliga	DFB-Pokal	Total
1	GK	(Portugal) Daniel Heuer Fernandes	33+0	1+0	34+0
2	DF	(France) William Mikelbrencis	15+11	0+0	15+11
6	MF	(Belgium) Albert Sambi Lokonga	20+6	0+0	20+6
7	FW	(France) Jean-Luc Dompé	12+8	0+1	12+9
8	DF	(Libya) Daniel Elfadli	15+6	2+0	17+6
9	FW	(Germany) Robert Glatzel	7+12	0+2	7+14
11	FW	(Ghana) Ransford-Yeboah Königsdörffer	29+4	3+0	32+4
14	FW	(France) Rayan Philippe	13+15	3+0	16+15
15	FW	(Denmark) Yussuf Poulsen	1+14	0+1	1+15
16	DF	(Georgia (country)) Giorgi Gocholeishvili	9+15	3+0	12+15
17	DF	(Comoros) Warmed Omari	17+3	0+0	17+3
18	MF	(The Gambia) Bakery Jatta	12+3	0+1	12+4
19	FW	(United States) Damion Downs	6+6	0+0	6+6
20	MF	(Portugal) Fábio Vieira	25+4	2+0	27+4
21	MF	(Germany) Nicolai Remberg	32+0	2+0	34+0
24	MF	(Argentina) Nicolás Capaldo	24+2	1+0	25+2
25	DF	(Nigeria) Jordan Torunarigha	21+3	3+0	24+4
25	FW	(Nigeria) Philip Otele	7+2	0+0	7+2
28	DF	(Switzerland) Miro Muheim	27+2	3+0	30+2
33	DF	(Germany) Noah Katterbach	0+0	0+0	0+0
38	FW	(Norway) Alexander Røssing-Lelesiit	5+6	3+0	8+6
40	GK	(Germany) Hannes Hermann	0+0	0+0	0+0
41	GK	(Germany) Fernando Dickes	0+0	0+0	0+0
44	DF	(Croatia) Luka Vušković	27+1	2+0	29+1
45	FW	(Portugal) Fabio Baldé	3+13	0+1	3+14
48	MF	(Germany) Bilal Yalcinkaya	0+0	0+0	0+0
49	FW	(Germany) Otto Stange	2+8	0+1	2+9
–	MF	(Germany) Levin Öztunalı	0+0	0+0	0+0

Last updated: 16 May 2026.
Source: FBref.com

=== Goalscorers ===
Rank	No.	Pos.	Player	Bundesliga	DFB-Pokal	Total
1	20	MF	(Portugal) Fábio Vieira	7	0	7
2	44	DF	(Croatia) Luka Vušković	6	0	6
3	11	FW	(Ghana) Ransford-Yeboah Königsdörffer	5	1	6
4	14	FW	(France) Rayan Philippe	5	0	5
4	6	MF	(Belgium) Albert Sambi Lokonga	5	0	5
6	9	FW	(Germany) Robert Glatzel	3	1	4
7	7	MF	(France) Jean-Luc Dompé	3	0	3
8	8	MF	(The Gambia) Bakery Jatta	1	1	2
9	7	FW	(Nigeria) Philip Otele	1	0	1
9	15	FW	(Denmark) Yussuf Poulsen	1	0	1
9	23	MF	(Denmark) Albert Grønbæk	1	0	1
9	24	DF	(Argentina) Nicolás Capaldo	1	0	1
9	45	DF	(Portugal) Fabio Baldé	1	0	1
14	13	DF	(Portugal) Guilherme Ramos	0	1	1
Totals				41	4	45

Last updated: 16 May 2026.
Source: FBref.com

=== Top assists ===
Rank	No.	Pos.	Player	Bundesliga	DFB-Pokal	Total
1	20	MF	(Portugal) Fábio Vieira	5	0	5
2	28	DF	(Switzerland) Miro Muheim	4	1	5
3	2	DF	(France) William Mikelbrencis	4	0	4
4	24	MF	(Argentina) Nicolás Capaldo	3	0	3
5	21	MF	(Germany) Nicolai Remberg	2	0	2
5	23	MF	(Germany) Robert Glatzel	2	0	2
5	23	MF	(Denmark) Albert Grønbæk	2	0	2
8	7 players			1	0	1
Totals				28	1	29

Last updated: 7 February 2026.
Source: FBref.com

=== Clean sheets ===
Rank	No.	Pos.	Player	Bundesliga	DFB-Pokal	Total
1	1	GK	(Portugal) Daniel Heuer Fernandes	6	1	7
Totals				6	1	7

Last updated: 7 February 2026.
Source: FBref.com

=== Discipline ===
No.	Pos.	Player	Bundesliga			DFB-Pokal			Total		
No.	Pos.	Player	Yellow card	(yellow card) (yellow-red card)	Red card	Yellow card	(yellow card) (yellow-red card)	Red card	Yellow card	(yellow card) (yellow-red card)	Red card
1	GK	(Portugal) Daniel Heuer Fernandes	3	0	0	0	0	0	3	0	0
2	DF	(France) William Mikelbrencis	3	0	0	0	0	0	3	0	0
4	DF	(Germany) Sebastian Schonlau	0	0	0	0	0	0	0	0	0
6	MF	(Belgium) Albert Sambi Lokonga	3	0	0	0	0	0	3	0	0
7	FW	(France) Jean-Luc Dompé	0	0	0	0	0	0	0	0	0
8	MF	(Libya) Daniel Elfadli	4	1	1	0	0	0	4	1	1
9	FW	(Germany) Robert Glatzel	0	0	0	0	0	0	0	0	0
10	MF	(Suriname) Immanuel Pherai	0	1	0	0	0	0	0	1	0
11	FW	(Ghana) Ransford-Yeboah Königsdörffer	1	0	0	0	0	0	1	0	0
13	DF	(Portugal) Guilherme Ramos	0	0	0	0	0	0	0	0	0
14	FW	(France) Rayan Philippe	2	0	0	0	0	0	2	0	0
15	FW	(Denmark) Yussuf Poulsen	4	0	0	0	0	0	4	0	0
16	DF	(Georgia (country)) Giorgi Gocholeishvili	1	1	0	0	0	0	1	1	0
18	MF	(Suriname) Bakery Jatta	1	0	0	0	0	0	1	0	0
20	MF	(Portugal) Fábio Vieira	2	1	2	0	0	0	2	1	2
21	MF	(Germany) Nicolai Remberg	11	0	0	2	0	0	13	0	0
22	DF	(France) Aboubaka Soumahoro	1	0	0	0	0	0	1	0	0
23	MF	(Germany) Jonas Meffert	0	0	0	1	0	0	1	0	0
24	MF	(Argentina) Nicolás Capaldo	10	0	0	0	0	0	10	0	0
25	DF	(Nigeria) Jordan Torunarigha	3	0	0	1	0	0	4	0	0
27	FW	(Nigeria) Philip Otele	3	0	1	0	0	0	3	0	1
28	DF	(Switzerland) Miro Muheim	7	0	1	0	0	0	7	0	1
29	FW	(Kosovo) Emir Sahiti	0	0	0	0	0	0	0	0	0
30	DF	(Switzerland) Silvan Hefti	0	0	0	0	0	0	0	0	0
33	DF	(Germany) Noah Katterbach	0	0	0	0	0	0	0	0	0
36	MF	(Finland) Anssi Suhonen	0	0	0	0	0	0	0	0	0
38	FW	(Norway) Alexander Røssing-Lelesiit	1	1	0	0	0	0	1	1	0
39	DF	(Germany) Joel Agyekum	0	0	0	0	0	0	0	0	0
40	GK	(Germany) Hannes Hermann	0	0	0	0	0	0	0	0	0
41	GK	(Germany) Fernando Dickes	0	0	0	0	0	0	0	0	0
44	DF	(Croatia) Luka Vušković	6	0	0	0	0	0	6	0	0
45	FW	(Portugal) Fabio Baldé	0	0	0	0	0	0	0	0	0
48	MF	(Germany) Bilal Yalcinkaya	0	0	0	0	0	0	0	0	0
49	FW	(Germany) Otto Stange	0	0	0	0	0	0	0	0	0
–	MF	(Germany) Levin Öztunalı	0	0	0	0	0	0	0	0	0

Last updated: 16 May 2026.
Source: FBref.com
