= Luka Vušković =

Croatian footballer (born 2007)

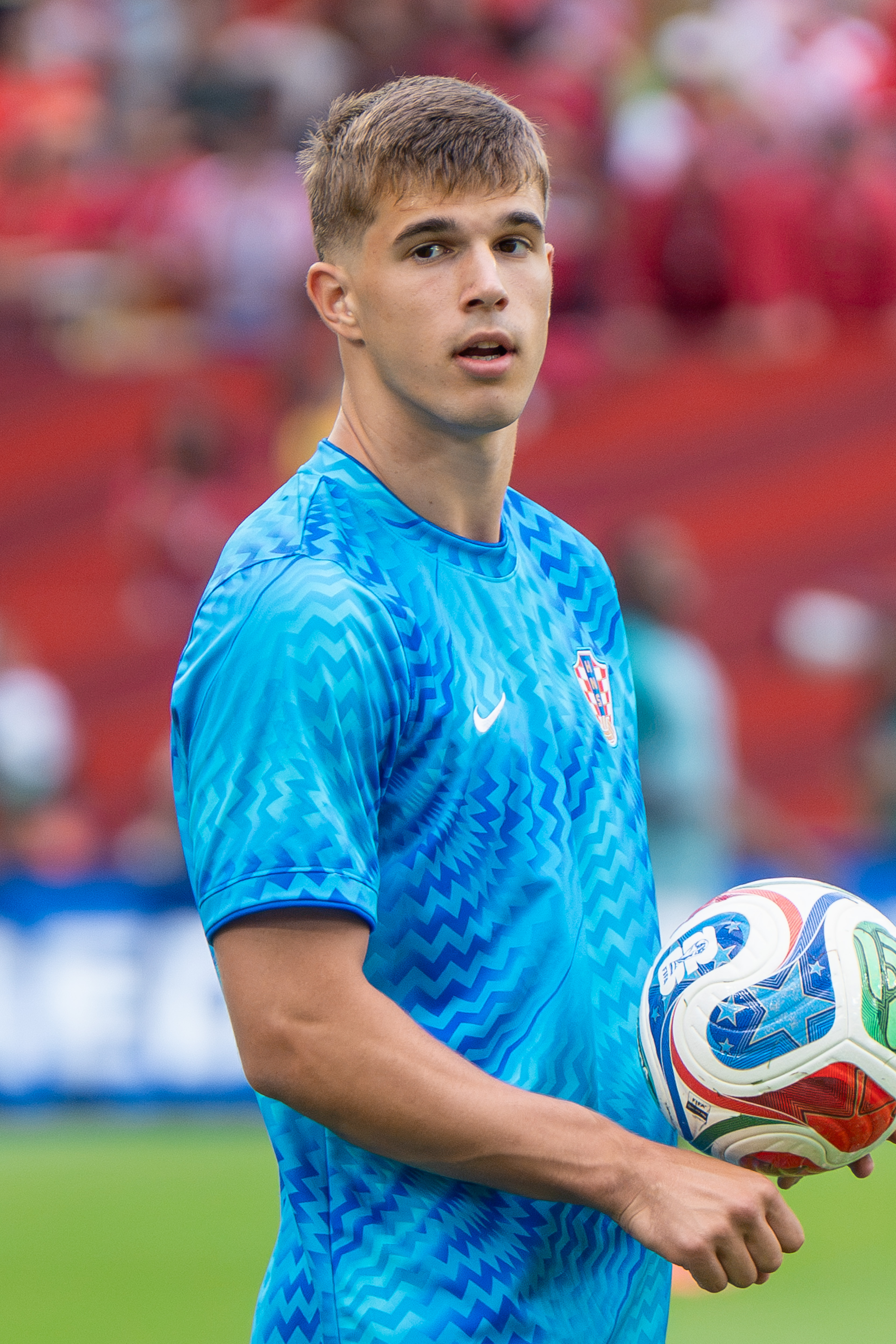
- Vušković with Croatia in 2026

Personal information
- Full name: Luka Vušković
- Date of birth: 24 February 2007 (age 19)
- Place of birth: Split, Croatia
- Height: 1.93 m (6 ft 4 in)
- Position: Centre-back

Team information
- Current team: Brighton & Hove Albion
- Number: 44

Youth career
- –2023: Hajduk Split

Senior career*
Years	Team	Apps	(Gls)
2023–2025	Hajduk Split	8	(0)
2024	→ Radomiak Radom (loan)	14	(3)
2024–2025	→ Westerlo (loan)	36	(7)
2025–2026	Tottenham Hotspur	0	(0)
2025–2026	→ Hamburger SV (loan)	28	(6)
2026–	Brighton & Hove Albion	11	(1)

International career^{‡}
2021	Croatia U15	3	(0)
2022	Croatia U16	3	(0)
2022	Croatia U17	4	(1)
2023	Croatia U19	5	(0)
2024–	Croatia U21	10	(2)
2025–	Croatia	12	(1)
- * Club domestic league appearances and goals as of 22 November 2026 ‡ National team caps and goals as of 15 November 2026

Luka Vušković (born 24 February 2007) is a Croatian professional footballer who plays as a centre-back for Premier League club Brighton & Hove Albion and the Croatia national team.

A product of his hometown Hajduk Split youth academy, he played on the senior team from 2023 to 2025. Vušković entered the Premier League with a one-year stint on Tottenham Hotspur until 2026. Brighton signed him later that year in a club-record £46 million transfer on a five-year contract. A former Croatian youth international, Vušković made his debut for the senior team in 2025 and was a member of the Croatia squad at the 2026 FIFA World Cup.

== Club career ==
=== Hajduk Split ===
Born in Split, Vušković progressed through the academy of the local side Hajduk Split, becoming the youngest Croatian to play, and to score, in the UEFA Youth League.

Vušković made his unofficial debut at 15, playing in a friendly against Urania in September 2022. On 16 December 2022, he scored in a 4–3 friendly victory over the German side Schalke 04.

On 26 February 2023, two days after his sixteenth birthday, Vušković made his professional debut, starting and playing 90 minutes in a league derby match against Dinamo Zagreb, which ended in a 4–0 loss for his side. In the process, he became the youngest player in the Croatian top flight, together with Marko Dabro; he also became the youngest player to ever feature in an Eternal derby game, surpassing Josip Bašić.

On 2 March 2023, Vušković scored the opening goal in Hajduk's 2–1 win over Osijek in the quarter-finals of the 2022–23 Croatian Football Cup. Scoring at 16 years and 5 days old, he became the youngest goalscorer in the history of Hajduk Split, in official matches.

==== Loan to Radomiak Radom ====
On 31 January 2024, after failing to make an appearance for Hajduk since the start of the 2023–24 season, Vušković joined Polish club Radomiak Radom on a six-month loan. He made his first-team – and Ekstraklasa – debut on 10 February 2024, coming on as a 64th-minute substitute for Mike Cestor in a 0–6 away loss against Cracovia. Six days later, Vušković received his first start for the club in a 0–4 home loss against Pogoń Szczecin. He returned to Hajduk at the end of the season.

==== Loan to Westerlo ====
On 9 July 2024, he was loaned to Westerlo in the Belgian Pro League. Even as a centre-back, he scored seven league goals throughout the course of the season and won the 2024 Belgian Pro League goal of the season award for his goal against Club Brugge.

=== Tottenham Hotspur ===
On 25 September 2023, Vušković reached an agreement with Tottenham Hotspur about joining the Premier League club in 2025, in a deal which will run until 2030. The deal was reported to be worth around £12 million. Vušković joined Tottenham in July 2025 for their 2025–26 preseason, where he got a goal and an assist in his unofficial debut for Tottenham in a 2–0 friendly win against Reading. Tottenham wanted to keep Vušković for the season as a backup player, where he was an unused substitute in the UEFA Super Cup final and Tottenham's first 2 Premier League matches of the season against Burnley and Manchester City, but Vušković requested to go out on loan as he wanted to get regular game time.

==== Loan to Hamburger SV ====
On 29 August 2025, Vušković moved on loan to Bundesliga club Hamburger SV in Germany, joining his brother Mario. Vušković scored his first goal for Hamburg on 20 September in a 2–1 league win over Heidenheim, and on 28 September, he became the first player to win 18 aerial duels in one match in Europe's top 5 leagues in 5 years whilst playing against Union Berlin, and won Bundesliga Rookie of the Month for September and October. On 7 December, Vušković scored his second goal for Hamburg in a 3–2 win against Werder Bremen which would win the Bundesliga Goal of the Year award. Vušković was named in the 2025–26 Bundesliga Team of the Season. He concluded the season with six goals in 28 Bundesliga appearances, finishing as the league's highest-scoring defender and recording the best duel success rate in the division at 69.1%.

=== Brighton & Hove Albion ===
On 14 July 2026, Brighton & Hove Albion announced the signing of Vušković on a five-year contract, for a reported club-record fee of £46 million ($61.5 million).

== International career ==
Vušković represented Croatia at youth international level, On 9 June 2025, he debuted for the senior national team in a 2026 World Cup qualifying match against the Czech Republic that ended in a 5–1 victory for Croatia, replacing Duje Ćaleta-Car in the 88th minute. Vušković made his first start for the Croatia national team on 14 November 2025 in a 3–1 win against the Faroe Islands, which qualified Croatia for the 2026 FIFA World Cup. On 26 March 2026, he scored his first goal for senior team in a friendly match against Colombia.

On 18 May 2026, Vušković was selected in the 26-man squad for the 2026 FIFA World Cup. Vušković played his first game at the World Cup against England where he became the youngest Croatian player in the tournament's history.

== Personal life ==
Hailing from a footballing family, Vušković's father, Danijel, formerly played for Hajduk Split, and now serves as a coach for the youth team. His grandfather, Mario, played for the youth teams of Hajduk Split during the tenure of Tomislav Ivić, and went on to forge a footballing career in the Netherlands. His great-grandfather, Marko, also played for Hajduk Split during World War II, and went on to work as a club executive. His brother, Mario, and cousins, Moreno and Vito, are also footballers, as was their father, Ronald.

== Style of play ==
Standing at 1.93 m (6.3 ft), Vušković holds an advantage among young players due to his height. He is notable for his positioning and ability to contemplate the opposition's plans and act accordingly. His heading abilities are also characteristic, making him a danger to the opposition during set pieces. For this reason, he is among the top scorers among young players, even though he plays as a centre-back. His imposing physique also gives him an advantage as a defender, while his quick thinking and ball distribution help facilitate attacks. Jacek Kulig, a scouting expert, stated that Vušković has no significant weaknesses.

Vušković's style of play has been compared to that of the Spanish international Gerard Piqué, while Vušković himself named Joško Gvardiol as his football role model.

== Career statistics ==
=== Club ===
As of match played 22 November 2026

Appearances and goals by club, season and competition
Club	Season	League			National cup (Note: Includes Croatian Cup, DFB-Pokal)		League cup (Note: Includes EFL Cup)		Europe		Other		Total	
Club	Season	Division	Apps	Goals	Apps	Goals	Apps	Goals	Apps	Goals	Apps	Goals	Apps	Goals
Hajduk Split	2022–23	HNL	8	0	3	1	—		0	0	0	0	11	1
Radomiak Radom (loan)	2023–24	Ekstraklasa	14	3	—		—		—		—		14	3
Westerlo (loan)	2024–25	Belgian Pro League	36	7	0	0	—		—		—		36	7
Hamburger SV (loan)	2025–26	Bundesliga	28	6	2	0	—		—		—		30	6
Brighton & Hove Albion	2026–27	Premier League	11	1	0	0	1	0	5 (Note: Appearances in UEFA Conference League)	0	—		17	1
Career total			97	17	5	1	1	0	5	0	0	0	108	18

=== International ===
As of match played 15 November 2026

Appearances and goals by national team and year
National team	Year	Apps	Goals
Croatia	2025	2	0
Croatia	2026	10	1
Total		12	1

Scores and results list Croatia's goal tally first.

List of international goals scored by Luka Vušković
No.	Date	Venue	Opponent	Score	Result	Competition
1	26 March 2026	Camping World Stadium, Orlando, United States	Colombia	1–1	2–1	Friendly

== Honours ==
Individual

- Belgian Golden Shoe Goal of the Season: 2024
- Bundesliga Rookie of the Month: September 2025, October 2025, January 2026, March 2026
- Bundesliga Goal of the Month: December 2025
- Bundesliga Goal of the Year: 2025
- Bundesliga Team of the Season: 2025–26
