= SKV Rutesheim =

German football club

- Full name: Sport- und Kulturvereinigung; Rutesheim 1945 e.V.
- Founded: 30 September 1945; 79 years ago
- Ground: Sportpark Bühl
- Capacity: 5,000
- President: Volker Epple
- Head coach: Rolf Kramer
- League: Landesliga Württemberg I (VII)
- 2015–16: 2nd
- Website: http://www.skv-rutesheim.de/
Home colours	Away colours

The SKV Rutesheim is a German association football club based in the city of Rutesheim, that competes in the Landesliga Württemberg.

== History ==
The Sport- und Kulturvereinigung Rutesheim was founded on 30 September 1945. It is the successor side to Freie Sportvereinigung Rutesheim founded on 17 July 1920 and disbanded in 1933 under the politically motivated policies of the Nazis which saw the dissolution of left-leaning worker's clubs like FSR, as well as clubs with religious affiliations.

The biggest achievement of the footballers of the SKV was their climb into the third-tier Amateurliga Nordwürttemberg in 1976. They lasted only a single season at that level, finishing in last place with only 10–50 points and 23–66 goals against. From 2008 to 2011, the club has played in the sixth-tier Verbandsliga Württemberg, but was relegated again at the end of the 2010–11 season.

== Honours ==
The club's honours:

=== First team ===
- 2nd Amateurliga
  - Champions: 1975–76
- Kreisliga A
  - Champions: 2000–01
- Bezirksliga Enz/Murr
  - Champions: 2004–05
- Landesliga Staffel I
  - Champions: 2007–08

=== Reserve team ===
- Kreisliga B
  - Champions: 2005–06
- Kreisliga A
  - Champions: 2008–09

== Recent seasons ==
The recent season-by-season performance of the club:

Season	Division	Tier	Position
2004–05	Bezirksliga Enz/Murr	VII	1st ↑
2005–06	Landesliga Württemberg I	VI	9th
2006–07	Landesliga Württemberg I	VI	2nd
2007–08	Landesliga Württemberg I	VI	1st ↑
2008–09	Verbandsliga Württemberg	VI	10th
2009–10	Verbandsliga Württemberg	VI	12th
2010–11	Verbandsliga Württemberg	VI	14th ↓
2011–12	Landesliga Württemberg I	VII	3rd
2012–13	Landesliga Württemberg I	VII	4th
2013–14	Landesliga Württemberg I	VII	8th
2014–15	Landesliga Württemberg I	VII	4th
2015–16	Landesliga Württemberg I	VII	2nd
2016–17	Landesliga Württemberg I	VII	

- With the introduction of the Regionalligas in 1994 and the 3. Liga in 2008 as the new third tier, below the 2. Bundesliga, all leagues below dropped one tier.

↑ Promoted	↓ Relegated

== Other departments ==
- handball
- gymnastics
- singing
- volleyball
- table tennis
- sports badge / walking

== Stadia ==
The SKV Rutesheim is playing at Sportpark Bühl for home matches. Beside the stadium Bühl there are two more turf grounds (Spitzwiesen and Jugendkleinspielfeld), an artificial turf ground, a small synthetic ground for training, and a DFB-mini-ground (artificial turf). Also there are the sports halls Bühl I and Bühl II for the handball, gymnastics and volleyball departments and the youth and senior footballers.

Before 1986 the ground Schelmenäcker behind today's festival hall was the home of the club. Today on the former ground there is a residential area.
