= Danijel Vušković =

Croatian footballer and coach

Daniel Vušković
Personal information
- Full name: Daniel Vušković
- Date of birth: 5 January 1981 (age 45)
- Place of birth: Deventer, Netherlands
- Height: 1.92 m (6 ft 3 1/2 in)
- Position: Defender

Youth career
- Hajduk Split

Senior career*
Years	Team	Apps	(Gls)
–2000	Hajduk Split		
2000–2001	Solin		
2001–2002	Hajduk Split	3	(0)
2002–2003	Šibenik	0	(0)
2003–2004	Rijeka	21	(1)
2005	Zadar	9	(1)
2006–2007	Solin		
2008	Luch-Energiya	1	(0)
2008–2009	Solin		
2010–2011	Dugopolje		
2011	Hrvace	0	(0)
2011	Uskok	0	(0)
2011–2013	Južnjak Sveta Nedjelja		

International career
1997	Croatia U15	1	(0)
1998–1999	Croatia U17	8	(1)
1999–2000	Croatia U18	4	(0)
1999–2000	Croatia U19	7	(0)
2000–2001	Croatia U20	5	(1)

Managerial career
- 2014–2024: Hajduk Split (academy coach)
- * Club domestic league appearances and goals

Daniel Vušković (born 5 January 1981) is a retired Croatian footballer. He is the father of Mario Vušković and Luka Vušković.
