= 2024–25 2. Bundesliga =

2. Bundesliga
- Season: 2024–25
- Dates: 2 August 2024 – 18 May 2025
- Champions: 1. FC Köln (5th title)
- Promoted: 1. FC Köln; Hamburger SV
- Relegated: SSV Ulm; Jahn Regensburg
- Matches: 306
- Goals: 925 (3.02 per match)
- Top goalscorer: Davie Selke (22 goals)
- Biggest home win: Elversberg 6–0 Regensburg
- Biggest away win: Regensburg 0–4 Fürth; Fürth 0–4 Nürnberg; Fürth 1–5 Darmstadt; Braunschweig 1–5 Hertha
- Highest scoring: Nürnberg 8–3 Regensburg
- Longest winning run: 4 games Kaiserslautern
- Longest unbeaten run: 11 games Hamburg
- Longest winless run: 8 games Braunschweig; Regensburg
- Longest losing run: 4 games four teams
- Highest attendance: 71,500; Hertha v Hamburg
- Lowest attendance: 8,451; Elversberg v Ulm
- Attendance: 9,434,101 (30,830 per match)

The 2024–25 2. Bundesliga was the 51st season of the 2. Bundesliga. It began on 2 August 2024 and concluded on 18 May 2025.

The fixtures were announced on 4 July 2024.

== Teams ==
Locations of the 2024–25 2. Bundesliga teams

=== Team changes ===
Promoted from 2023–24 3. Liga	Relegated from 2023–24 Bundesliga	Promoted to 2024–25 Bundesliga	Relegated to 2024–25 3. Liga
SSV Ulm; Preußen Münster; Jahn Regensburg	1. FC Köln; Darmstadt 98	FC St. Pauli; Holstein Kiel	Wehen Wiesbaden; Hansa Rostock; VfL Osnabrück

=== Stadiums and locations ===
Team	Location	Stadium	Capacity
Hertha BSC	Berlin	Olympiastadion	74,649
Eintracht Braunschweig	Braunschweig	Eintracht-Stadion	23,325
Darmstadt 98	Darmstadt	Merck-Stadion am Böllenfalltor	17,650
Fortuna Düsseldorf	Düsseldorf	Merkur Spiel-Arena	54,600
SV Elversberg	Spiesen-Elversberg	Waldstadion an der Kaiserlinde	10,000
Greuther Fürth	Fürth	Sportpark Ronhof Thomas Sommer	16,626
Hamburger SV	Hamburg	Volksparkstadion	57,000
Hannover 96	Hanover	Heinz von Heiden Arena	49,000
1. FC Kaiserslautern	Kaiserslautern	Fritz-Walter-Stadion	49,327
Karlsruher SC	Karlsruhe	BBBank Wildpark	34,302
1. FC Köln	Cologne	RheinEnergieStadion	49,698
1. FC Magdeburg	Magdeburg	Avnet Arena	30,098
Preußen Münster	Münster	LVM-Preußenstadion	14,300
1. FC Nürnberg	Nuremberg	Max-Morlock-Stadion	49,923
SC Paderborn	Paderborn	Home Deluxe Arena	15,000
Jahn Regensburg	Regensburg	Jahnstadion Regensburg	15,210
Schalke 04	Gelsenkirchen	Veltins-Arena	62,271
SSV Ulm	Ulm	Donaustadion	19,500

=== Personnel and kits ===
Team	Manager	Captain	Kit manufacturer	Shirt sponsor	
Team	Manager	Captain	Kit manufacturer	Front	Sleeve
Hertha BSC	(Germany) Stefan Leitl	(Germany) Toni Leistner	Nike	CheckCars24.de	WTG
Eintracht Braunschweig	(Germany) Marc Pfitzner	(Bosnia and Herzegovina) Ermin Bičakčić	Puma	BRAWO Group	Lease a Bike
Darmstadt 98	(Germany) Florian Kohfeldt	(Germany) Fabian Holland	Craft	HAIX	28 Black
Fortuna Düsseldorf	(Germany) Daniel Thioune	(Germany) André Hoffmann	Adidas	Targobank	Metro Chef
SV Elversberg	(Germany) Horst Steffen	(Germany) Robin Fellhauer	Nike	HYLO	Pure Steel
Greuther Fürth	(Germany) Thomas Kleine / (Montenegro) Milorad Peković	(Sweden) Branimir Hrgota	Puma	Hofmann Personal	Signia
Hamburger SV	(Germany) Merlin Polzin	(Germany) Sebastian Schonlau	Adidas	HanseMerkur	Plan International
Hannover 96	(Germany) Lars Barlemann / (Germany) Dirk Lottner / (Germany) Christian Schulz	(Germany) Ron-Robert Zieler	Macron	Heise	ÜSTRA
1. FC Kaiserslautern	(Germany) Torsten Lieberknecht	(Germany) Marlon Ritter	Castore	Novoline	Lacalut
Karlsruher SC	(Germany) Christian Eichner	(Germany) Marvin Wanitzek	Macron	SWEG	billiger.de
1. FC Köln	(Germany) Friedhelm Funkel	(Germany) Timo Hübers	Hummel	REWE	DEVK
1. FC Magdeburg	(Germany) Christian Titz	(Germany) Dominik Reimann	Hummel	Humanas	SWM Magdeburg
Preußen Münster	(Germany) Kieran Schulze-Marmeling	(Germany) Marc Lorenz	Jako	FIEGE	Stadtwerke Münster
1. FC Nürnberg	(Germany) Miroslav Klose	(Germany) Robin Knoche	Adidas	Nürnberger Versicherung	Helmsauer
SC Paderborn	(Poland) Lukas Kwasniok	(Germany) Raphael Obermair	Saller	Four 20 Pharma	Personalco
Jahn Regensburg	(Germany) Munier Raychouni	(Germany) Andreas Geipl	Hummel	Netto	None
Schalke 04	(Germany) Jakob Fimpel	(Turkey) Kenan Karaman	Adidas	SUN Minimeal	hülsta
SSV Ulm	(Germany) Robert Lechleiter	(Germany) Johannes Reichert	Uhlsport	Liqui Moly	B-ITE E-Recruiting

=== Managerial changes ===
Team	Outgoing	Manner	Exit date		Position in table	Incoming	Incoming date		Ref.
Team	Outgoing	Manner	Announced on	Departed on	Position in table	Incoming	Announced on	Arrived on	Ref.
1. FC Kaiserslautern	(Germany) Friedhelm Funkel	Mutual consent	17 May 2024	30 June 2024	Pre-season	(Germany) Markus Anfang	29 May 2024	1 July 2024	
Hertha BSC	(Hungary) Pál Dárdai	End of contract	18 May 2024	30 June 2024	Pre-season	(Germany) Cristian Fiél	6 June 2024	1 July 2024	
1. FC Köln	(Germany) Timo Schultz	End of contract	27 May 2024	30 June 2024	Pre-season	(Austria) Gerhard Struber	12 June 2024	1 July 2024	
1. FC Nürnberg	(Germany) Cristian Fiél	Signed by Hertha BSC	6 June 2024	30 June 2024	Pre-season	(Germany) Miroslav Klose	11 June 2024	1 July 2024	
Darmstadt 98	(Germany) Torsten Lieberknecht	Resigned	1 September 2024		18th	(Germany) Florian Kohfeldt	7 September 2024		
Schalke 04	(Belgium) Karel Geraerts	Sacked	21 September 2024		14th	(Germany) Jakob Fimpel (interim)	21 September 2024		
Schalke 04	(Germany) Jakob Fimpel (interim)	End of caretaker	6 October 2024		13th	(Netherlands) Kees van Wonderen	6 October 2024		
Greuther Fürth	(Germany) Alexander Zorniger	Sacked	22 October 2024		12th	(Germany) Leonhard Haas (interim)	22 October 2024		
Jahn Regensburg	(United States) Joe Enochs	Sacked	27 October 2024		18th	(Germany) Andreas Patz	27 October 2024		
Greuther Fürth	(Germany) Leonhard Haas (interim)	End of caretaker	12 November 2024		12th	(Germany) Jan Siewert	12 November 2024		
Hamburger SV	(Germany) Steffen Baumgart	Sacked	24 November 2024		7th	(Germany) Merlin Polzin	24 November 2024		
Hannover 96	(Germany) Stefan Leitl	Sacked	29 December 2024		7th	(Germany) André Breitenreiter	29 December 2024		
Hertha BSC	(Germany) Cristian Fiél	Sacked	17 February 2025		14th	(Germany) Stefan Leitl	18 February 2025		
SSV Ulm	(Germany) Thomas Wörle	Sacked	11 March 2025		17th	(Germany) Robert Lechleiter	11 March 2025		
1. FC Kaiserslautern	(Germany) Markus Anfang	Sacked	22 April 2025		7th	(Germany) Torsten Lieberknecht	22 April 2025		
Hannover 96	(Germany) André Breitenreiter	Mutual consent	23 April 2025		10th	(Germany) Lars Barlemann / (Germany) Dirk Lottner / (Germany) Christian Schulz (interim)	23 April 2025		
Preußen Münster	(Germany) Sascha Hildmann	Sacked	27 April 2025		17th	(Germany) Kieran Schulze-Marmeling (interim)	28 April 2025		
Schalke 04	(Netherlands) Kees van Wonderen	Sacked	3 May 2025		13th	(Germany) Jakob Fimpel (interim)	3 May 2025		
1. FC Köln	(Austria) Gerhard Struber	Sacked	5 May 2025		2nd	(Germany) Friedhelm Funkel (interim)	5 May 2025		
Greuther Fürth	(Germany) Jan Siewert	Sacked	5 May 2025		14th	(Germany) Thomas Kleine / (Montenegro) Milorad Peković	6 May 2025		
Jahn Regensburg	(Germany) Andreas Patz	Resigned	8 May 2025		18th	(Germany) Munier Raychouni (interim)	8 May 2025		
Eintracht Braunschweig	(Germany) Daniel Scherning	Sacked	19 May 2025		16th	(Germany) Marc Pfitzner (interim)	19 May 2025		

== League table ==
Pos	Team	Pld	W	D	L	GF	GA	GD	Pts	Promotion, qualification or relegation
1	1. FC Köln (C, P)	34	18	7	9	53	38	+15	61	Promotion to Bundesliga
2	Hamburger SV (P)	34	16	11	7	78	44	+34	59	Promotion to Bundesliga
3	SV Elversberg	34	16	10	8	64	37	+27	58	Qualification for promotion play-offs
4	SC Paderborn	34	15	10	9	56	46	+10	55	
5	1. FC Magdeburg	34	14	11	9	64	52	+12	53	
6	Fortuna Düsseldorf	34	14	11	9	57	52	+5	53	
7	1. FC Kaiserslautern	34	15	8	11	56	55	+1	53	
8	Karlsruher SC	34	14	10	10	57	55	+2	52	
9	Hannover 96	34	13	12	9	41	36	+5	51	
10	1. FC Nürnberg	34	14	6	14	60	57	+3	48	
11	Hertha BSC	34	12	8	14	49	51	−2	44	
12	Darmstadt 98	34	11	9	14	56	55	+1	42	
13	Greuther Fürth	34	10	9	15	45	59	−14	39	
14	Schalke 04	34	10	8	16	52	62	−10	38	
15	Preußen Münster	34	8	12	14	40	43	−3	36	
16	Eintracht Braunschweig (O)	34	8	11	15	38	64	−26	35	Qualification for relegation play-offs
17	SSV Ulm (R)	34	6	12	16	36	48	−12	30	Relegation to 3. Liga
18	Jahn Regensburg (R)	34	6	7	21	23	71	−48	25	Relegation to 3. Liga

Source: Bundesliga
Rules for classification: 1) Points; 2) Goal difference; 3) Goals scored; 4) Head-to-head results; 5) Head-to-head away goals scored; 6) Away goals scored; 7) Play-off.
(Rules 4–6 only apply after home and away matches have been played between the tied teams.)
(C) Champions; (O) Play-off winners; (P) Promoted; (R) Relegated

== Results ==
Home \ Away	BRA	BSC	DAR	DÜS	ELV	FÜR	HAM	HAN	KAI	KAR	KÖL	MAG	MÜN	NÜR	PAD	REG	SCH	ULM
Eintracht Braunschweig	—	1–5	1–0	2–2	0–3	2–0	3–1	2–0	2–0	1–2	1–2	1–3	1–1	1–4	3–2	0–0	0–0	1–1
Hertha BSC	3–1	—	1–1	0–2	1–4	1–0	2–3	1–1	0–1	3–1	0–1	1–1	1–2	0–0	1–2	2–0	1–2	2–2
Darmstadt 98	1–1	3–1	—	0–2	0–3	1–0	0–4	3–1	5–1	3–0	5–1	1–2	0–0	1–1	0–1	3–1	2–0	1–1
Fortuna Düsseldorf	5–0	2–1	2–2	—	0–2	1–2	0–3	1–0	3–4	0–0	2–2	2–5	1–0	3–3	1–1	1–0	2–0	3–2
SV Elversberg	3–0	4–0	4–0	1–1	—	2–0	4–2	3–1	1–0	2–2	2–2	2–5	0–1	2–1	1–3	6–0	1–4	1–3
Greuther Fürth	3–0	2–1	1–5	1–2	0–0	—	3–2	1–0	2–4	2–3	1–1	1–1	3–1	0–4	1–1	2–1	3–3	0–1
Hamburger SV	2–4	1–1	2–2	4–1	0–0	5–0	—	2–2	3–0	1–2	1–0	3–1	4–1	1–1	2–2	5–0	2–2	6–1
Hannover 96	1–1	0–0	1–2	1–1	1–3	1–1	1–0	—	3–1	2–1	1–0	0–0	2–2	2–0	1–1	2–0	1–0	3–2
1. FC Kaiserslautern	3–2	3–4	2–1	3–1	1–1	2–2	2–2	0–0	—	3–1	0–1	2–2	2–1	1–2	3–0	3–0	2–1	2–1
Karlsruher SC	0–2	1–3	3–3	2–3	3–2	1–0	1–3	1–0	2–2	—	1–0	3–1	1–1	3–2	3–0	4–2	2–0	0–0
1. FC Köln	5–0	0–1	2–1	1–1	1–0	1–0	1–2	2–2	4–0	4–4	—	1–2	3–1	3–1	1–2	1–1	1–0	2–0
1. FC Magdeburg	1–1	1–3	4–1	4–2	0–0	2–2	0–3	0–3	2–0	2–2	3–0	—	0–5	3–4	1–1	3–0	2–2	0–0
Preußen Münster	1–1	2–0	1–1	1–0	1–1	2–1	1–2	0–0	0–1	1–1	0–1	1–2	—	0–1	3–3	2–0	1–2	0–0
1. FC Nürnberg	1–0	0–2	1–0	2–2	1–3	3–0	0–3	1–2	0–0	2–1	1–2	0–4	3–2	—	2–3	8–3	3–1	2–0
SC Paderborn	0–0	1–2	3–1	1–2	1–1	1–2	2–0	2–1	5–3	1–2	1–2	2–1	2–0	3–2	—	3–0	2–4	0–0
Jahn Regensburg	1–1	2–0	2–1	0–3	1–0	0–4	1–1	0–1	0–0	2–2	0–1	0–1	0–3	2–1	0–0	—	2–0	1–0
Schalke 04	5–1	2–2	3–5	1–1	1–2	3–4	2–2	1–2	0–3	2–1	1–3	2–5	1–0	3–1	0–2	2–0	—	2–1
SSV Ulm	3–1	2–3	2–1	1–2	0–0	1–1	1–1	1–2	1–2	0–1	0–1	1–0	2–2	1–2	0–2	5–1	0–0	—

Source: Bundesliga
Legend: Blue = home team win; Yellow = draw; Red = away team win.
For upcoming matches, an "a" indicates there is an article about the rivalry between the two participants.

== Promotion/relegation play-offs ==
The promotion/relegation play-offs will take place on 23 and 27 May 2025.

=== Overview ===
Team 1	Agg.	Team 2	1st leg	2nd leg
1. FC Saarbrücken (3L)	2–4	Eintracht Braunschweig (2B)	0–2	2–2

=== Matches ===
23 May 2025
20:30

1. FC Saarbrücken	0–2	Eintracht Braunschweig
	Report	Tempelmann 49'; Rittmüller 61'

Ludwigsparkstadion, Saarbrücken
Attendance: 15,000
Referee: Tobias Welz
27 May 2025
20:30

Eintracht Braunschweig	2–2	1. FC Saarbrücken
Sanchez 105+2'; Philippe 120'	Report	Krüger 66' (pen.); Brünker 83'

Eintracht-Stadion, Braunschweig
Attendance: 21,852
Referee: Tobias Stieler

Eintracht Braunschweig won 4–2 on aggregate, and therefore both clubs remained in their respective leagues.

== Statistics ==
=== Top goalscorers ===
Rank	Player	Club	Goals
1	(Germany) Davie Selke	Hamburger SV	22
2	(Netherlands) Martijn Kaars	1. FC Magdeburg	19
3	(Germany) Ragnar Ache	1. FC Kaiserslautern	18
3	(Kosovo) Fisnik Asllani	SV Elversberg	18
5	(Mali) Moussa Sylla	Schalke 04	16
6	(Ghana) Ransford-Yeboah Königsdörffer	Hamburger SV	14
6	(Sweden) Isac Lidberg	Darmstadt 98	14
7	(Turkey) Kenan Karaman	Schalke 04	13
7	(Poland) Dawid Kownacki	Fortuna Düsseldorf	13
7	(France) Rayan Philippe	Eintracht Braunschweig	13
7	(Germany) Marvin Wanitzek	Karlsruher SC	13

=== Hat-tricks ===
Date	Player	Club	Against	Result
3 August 2024	(Georgia (country)) Budu Zivzivadze	Karlsruher SC	1. FC Nürnberg	3–2 (H)
20 September 2024	(Sweden) Isac Lidberg	Darmstadt 98	Schalke 04	5–3 (A)
29 September 2024	(Germany) Marvin Wanitzek	Karlsruher SC	1. FC Köln	4–4 (A)
25 October 2024	(Germany) Julian Justvan	1. FC Nürnberg	Jahn Regensburg	8–3 (H)
19 January 2025	(Netherlands) Martijn Kaars	1. FC Magdeburg	SV Elversberg	5–2 (A)
26 January 2025	(Germany) Semir Telalović^{4}	SSV Ulm	Jahn Regensburg	5–1 (H)
1 February 2025	(Netherlands) Martijn Kaars^{4}	1. FC Magdeburg	Schalke 04	5–2 (A)
12 April 2025	(Kosovo) Fisnik Asllani	SV Elversberg	Hannover 96	3–1 (A)

^{4} Player scored four goals.

=== Clean sheets ===
Rank	Player	Club	Clean sheets
1	(Austria) Nicolas Kristof	SV Elversberg	13
2	(Germany) Ron-Robert Zieler	Hannover 96	11
3	(Germany) Florian Kastenmeier	Fortuna Düsseldorf	9
3	(Germany) Johannes Schenk	Preußen Münster	9
3	(Germany) Marvin Schwäbe	1. FC Köln	9
6	(Germany) Daniel Heuer Fernandes	Hamburger SV	8
6	(Germany) Julian Krahl	1. FC Kaiserslautern	8
6	(Germany) Jan Reichert	1. FC Nürnberg	8
6	(Germany) Dominik Reimann	1. FC Magdeburg	8
6	(Germany) Max Weiß	Karlsruher SC	8
