= Hillebrand Gori =

German international logistics company

Hillebrand Gori, formerly JF Hillebrand, is an international logistics company specializing in beer, wine and distilled spirits. The company provides airfreight, inland transport, warehousing, insurance, and inventory management. It's based in Mainz, Germany. Its services range from full container loads of bulk wine to small consignments via airfreight.

== History ==
The freight forwarder J. F. Hillebrand was founded on 1 July 1844 by 25-year-old Johann Friedrich Hillebrand (1819–1890) as a freight commission business with loading and unloading services including an associated customs agency. It is the world's largest wine and beverage forwarder.

In the middle of the 19th century the wine trade in Mainz flourished again with the Rhine romanticism. Johann Friedrich Hillebrand acquired lighters for river transport and thus continued the inland navigation business of his ancestors. The Mainz-Ludwigshafen railway line, newly opened in 1853, and the West Rhine Railway, newly built in 1859, formed the basis for the expansion of business to include rail and the eastern markets. In 1875 the generation of sons followed with Dionis and Ludwig Damian Hillebrand and further expanded the Rhine freight traffic. In addition to their core business, they took over the Mainz agency for ship passages of the Hamburg-America Line for the Hamburg-Amerikanische Packetfahrt-Actien-Gesellschaft.

After the Second World War, Karl Hillebrand, Dionis' son, began inter-zone trading between the French occupied zone of Mainz and the surrounding area and the American occupied zone in Mainz-Kastel. Jan W. Hillebrand, who had returned from Allied captivity as a prisoner of war, took over the management of the Mainzer Lagerhaus A.G., which was integrated into the Hillebrand forwarding agency in 1953.

Until the 1960s, the Spedition exported worldwide, mainly German wines. From the middle of the decade more and more intermodal containers were used in the logistics business. The stable, sealed containers offered the advantage that the attractive freight was better protected against transport damage and theft. With Hillebrand's Wine-Line, this concept was also extended to other classic European wine exporting countries. In 1974 the company moved to the new premises in Mainz-Hechtsheim. In 1986 Jan W. Hillebrand left the company and handed over the business to Christof J. F. Hillebrand, the fifth generation of the family-run company.

In early 2022 Hillebrand was bought over by DHL, the future name will be ″Hillebrand Gori, a DHL company″.

== See also ==
- Fiege Logistik
