= 2024–25 Eintracht Braunschweig season =

Eintracht Braunschweig
2024–25 season
- Manager: Daniel Scherning
- Stadium: Eintracht-Stadion
- 2. Bundesliga: 16th place
- DFB-Pokal: First round
- Top goalscorer: League: Rayan Philippe (13); All: Rayan Philippe (14)
- Highest home attendance: 22,917 vs 1. FC Nürnberg
- Lowest home attendance: 18,714 vs SV Darmstadt 98
- Average home league attendance: 21,044
- Biggest win: Hamburger SV 2–4 Eintracht Braunschweig
- Biggest defeat: 1. FC Köln 5–0 Eintracht Braunschweig; Fortuna Düsseldorf 5–0 Eintracht Beraunschweig
Home colours

The 2024–25 season is the 130th season in the history of Eintracht Braunschweig and the third consecutive season in 2. Bundesliga. In addition to the domestic league, the team is scheduled to participate in the DFB-Pokal.

== Transfers ==
=== In ===
Pos.	Player	Transferred from	Fee	Date	Source
DF	(Germany) Kevin Ehlers	(Germany) Dynamo Dresden	Free	1 July 2024	
GK	(Germany) Lennart Grill	(Germany) 1. FC Union Berlin	Loan	4 July 2024	
FW	(Germany) Christian Conteh	(Germany) VfL Osnabrück	Free	10 July 2024	
MF	(Netherlands) Walid Ould-Chikh	(Netherlands) FC Volendam	Undisclosed	31 July 2024	

=== Out ===
Pos.	Player	Transferred to	Fee	Date	Source
DF	(Turkey) Hasan Kuruçay	(Belgium) OH Leuven	End of contract	1 July 2024	
FW	(Nigeria) Anthony Ujah	(Bulgaria) Botev Plovdiv	End of contract	1 July 2024	
FW	(Germany) Kaan Caliskaner	(Poland) Motor Lublin		16 July 2024	

== Friendlies ==
The first test matches were announced on 30 May 2024. Eintracht Braunschweig is holding a training camp in Bad Häring, Tyrol, Austria from 29 June to 7 July.

=== Pre-season ===
26 June 2024 Friendly	MTV Wolfenbüttel (Germany)	1–8	(Germany) Eintracht Braunschweig	Wolfenbüttel
19:00				Stadium: Sportpark Meesche

28 June 2024 Friendly	Eintracht Braunschweig (Germany)	1–0	(Germany) Hallescher FC	Braunschweig
13:00	Sané 52'			Stadium: Eintracht-Stadion; Attendance: 0

2 July 2024 Friendly	Eintracht Braunschweig (Germany)	0–1	(Switzerland) FC Winterthur	Jenbach, Austria
18:00			Fofana 47'	Stadium: Stadion Jenbach

6 July 2024 Friendly	FC Basel (Switzerland)	1–1	(Germany) Eintracht Braunschweig	Schwaz, Austria
15:15	Beney 36'		Lucoqui 39'	Stadium: Silberstadt Arena Schwaz
Note: 2 x 40 minutes

6 July 2024 Friendly	Eintracht Braunschweig (Germany)	1–0	(Greece) Panathinaikos	Grödig, Austria
17:00	Ba 62'			Stadium: DAS.GOLDBERG Stadion

13 July 2024 PUMA-Cup	SV Drochtersen Assel (Germany)	0–7	(Germany) Eintracht Braunschweig	Drochtersen
13:30		Report	Köhler 26'; Kaufmann 27'; Sané 28'; Szabó 36', 60'; Marie 49', 53'	Stadium: Kehdinger Stadion
Note: 60-minutes match

13 July 2024 PUMA-Cup	Blau-Weiß Lohne (Germany)	1–3	(Germany) Eintracht Braunschweig	Drochtersen
15:00	Thoben 21'	Report	Tauer 27'; Philippe 41'; Gomez 54'	Stadium: Kehdinger Stadion
Note: 60-minutes match

20 July 2024 Friendly	Eintracht Braunschweig (Germany)	2–1	(Germany) Hansa Rostock
14:00	12'; 30'		28'

21 July 2024 Friendly	Eintracht Braunschweig (Germany)	3–2	(Germany) Energie Cottbus	Braunschweig
13:00	Philippe 26', 45'; Marie 90'	Report	Pronichev 14'; Shcherbakovski 69'	Stadium: B-Platz Eintracht-Stadion

27 July 2024 Friendly	Eintracht Braunschweig (Germany)	5–1	(Germany) VfL Osnabrück	Braunschweig
				Stadium: Eintracht-Stadion

=== Mid-season ===
11 January 2025 Friendly	Eintracht Braunschweig (Germany)	4–2	(Germany) Energie Cottbus
13:30

20 March 2025 Friendly	Holstein Kiel (Germany)	2–2	(Germany) Eintracht Braunschweig
13:00

== Competitions ==
=== Overall record ===
Competition	First match	Last match	Starting round	Final position	Record							
Competition	First match	Last match	Starting round	Final position	Pld	W	D	L	GF	GA	GD	Win %
2. Bundesliga	3 August 2024	18 May 2025	Matchday 1	16th place	34	8	11	15	38	64	−26	23.53
Relegation play-offs	23 May 2025	27 May 2025	First leg	Stays in league	2	1	1	0	4	2	+2	50.00
DFB-Pokal	19 August 2024	19 August 2024	First round	First round	1	0	0	1	1	4	−3	0.00
Total					37	9	12	16	43	70	−27	24.32

Last updated: complete
Source: Competitions

=== 2. Bundesliga ===
==== League table ====
Pos	Team	Pld	W	D	L	GF	GA	GD	Pts	Promotion, qualification or relegation
14	Schalke 04	34	10	8	16	52	62	−10	38	
15	Preußen Münster	34	8	12	14	40	43	−3	36	
16	Eintracht Braunschweig (O)	34	8	11	15	38	64	−26	35	Qualification for relegation play-offs
17	SSV Ulm (R)	34	6	12	16	36	48	−12	30	Relegation to 3. Liga
18	Jahn Regensburg (R)	34	6	7	21	23	71	−48	25	Relegation to 3. Liga

Source: Bundesliga
Rules for classification: 1) Points; 2) Goal difference; 3) Goals scored; 4) Head-to-head results; 5) Head-to-head away goals scored; 6) Away goals scored; 7) Play-off.
(Rules 4–6 only apply after home and away matches have been played between the tied teams.)
(O) Play-off winners; (R) Relegated

==== Results summary ====
Overall								Home						Away					
Pld	W	D	L	GF	GA	GD	Pts	W	D	L	GF	GA	GD	W	D	L	GF	GA	GD
32	8	11	13	37	57	−20	35	6	5	5	21	22	−1	2	6	8	16	35	−19

Last updated: 3 May 2025.

==== Results by round ====
Round	1	2	3	4	5	6	7	8	9	10	11	12	13	14	15	16	17	18	19	20	21	22	23	24	25	26	27	28	29	30	31	32
Ground	A	H	A	H	A	H	A	H	A	H	A	H	A	H	A	H	A	H	A	H	A	H	A	H	A	H	A	H	A	H	A	H
Result	L	L	L	L	D	W	L	W	L	D	D	W	L	D	L	L	L	D	D	L	W	W	L	D	D	L	D	W	W	W	D	D
Position	18	18	18	18	18	17	17	15	16	16	17	15	15	15	15	17	17	17	17	17	16	15	16	16	16	16	16	16	15	15	15	

Updated to match(es) played on 3 May 2025. Source:
A = Away; H = Home; W = Win; D = Draw; L = Loss

==== Matches ====
The match schedule was released on 4 July 2024.

3 August 2024 1	Schalke 04	5–1	Eintracht Braunschweig	Gelsenkirchen
20:30	Mohr 9'; Sylla 25', 82'; Karaman 73', 83'	Report	Ehlers 33'	Stadium: Veltins-Arena; Attendance: 60,534; Referee: Tobias Stieler

11 August 2024 2	Eintracht Braunschweig	1–3	1. FC Magdeburg	Braunschweig
13:30	Philippe 67'	Report	Kaars 13', 55'; Gnaka 59'	Stadium: Eintracht-Stadion; Attendance: 22,791; Referee: Tobias Reichel

24 August 2024 3	1. FC Köln	5–0	Eintracht Braunschweig	Cologne
20:30	Hübers 26'; Ljubičić 34', 61'; Lemperle 58'; Waldschmidt 88'	Report		Stadium: RheinEnergieStadion; Attendance: 50,000; Referee: Matthias Jöllenbeck

1 September 2024 4	Eintracht Braunschweig	1–2	Karlsruher SC	Braunschweig
13:30	Bičakčić 14'	Report	Hunziker 73'; Zivzivadze 87'	Stadium: Eintracht-Stadion; Attendance: 19,908; Referee: Tom Bauer

14 September 2024 5	Darmstadt 98	1–1	Eintracht Braunschweig	Darmstadt
13:00	López 28'	Report	Szabó 86'	Stadium: Merck-Stadion am Böllenfalltor; Attendance: 17,076; Referee: Felix Prigan

21 September 2024 6	Eintracht Braunschweig	2–0	Greuther Fürth	Braunschweig
13:00	Philippe 33', 63'	Report		Stadium: Eintracht-Stadion; Attendance: 19,018; Referee: Lars Erbst

27 September 2024 7	SSV Ulm	3–1	Eintracht Braunschweig	Ulm
18:30	Rösch 14'; Krattenmacher 39'; Higl 84' (pen.)	Report	Szabó 76'	Stadium: Donaustadion; Attendance: 13,607; Referee: Richard Hempel

6 October 2024 8	Eintracht Braunschweig	2–0	Hannover 96	Braunschweig
13:00	Kaufmann 20'; Philippe 90+3' (pen.)	Report		Stadium: Eintracht-Stadion; Attendance: 19,909; Referee: Daniel Schlager

18 October 2024 9	Hertha BSC	3–1	Eintracht Braunschweig	Berlin
18:30 UTC+2	Cuisance 54' (pen.); Maza 72' (pen.); Niederlechner 83'	Report	Szabó 38'	Stadium: Olympiastadion; Attendance: 45,457; Referee: Robin Braun

27 October 2024 10	Eintracht Braunschweig	1–1	Preußen Münster	Braunschweig
13:30	Philippe 15'	Report	Hendrix 16'	Stadium: Eintracht-Stadion; Attendance: 21,809; Referee: Patrick Schwengers

3 November 2024 11	SC Paderborn	0–0	Eintracht Braunschweig	Paderborn
13:30 UTC+1		Report		Stadium: Home Deluxe Arena; Attendance: 13,949; Referee: Wolfgang Haslberger

8 November 2024 12	Eintracht Braunschweig	3–1	Hamburger SV	Braunschweig
18:30 UTC+1	Philippe 35', 65'; Di Michele Sanchez 49'	Report	Poręba 73'	Stadium: Eintracht-Stadion; Attendance: 22,418; Referee: Daniel Siebert

24 November 2024 13	1. FC Kaiserslautern	3–2	Eintracht Braunschweig	Kaiserslautern
13:30 UTC+1	Kaloč 17'; Ache 41'; Hanslik 45+2'	Report	Philippe 45' (pen.), 90+6'	Stadium: Fritz-Walter-Stadion; Attendance: 45,615; Referee: Max Burda

30 November 2024 14	Eintracht Braunschweig	0–0	Jahn Regensburg	Braunschweig
13:00 UTC+1		Report		Stadium: Eintracht-Stadion; Attendance: 19,540; Referee: Patrick Alt

8 December 2024 15	Fortuna Düsseldorf	5–0	Eintracht Braunschweig	Düsseldorf
13:30 UTC+1	Kownacki 4', 11'; Jóhannesson 8', 70'; Pejčinović 87'	Report		Stadium: Merkur Spielarena; Attendance: 34,500; Referee: Daniel Schlager

15 December 2024 16	Eintracht Braunschweig	0–3	SV Elversberg	Braunschweig
13:00 UTC+1		Report	Asllani 62', 78'; Neubauer 90+1'	Stadium: Eintracht-Stadion; Attendance: 18,803; Referee: Richard Hempel

21 December 2024 17	1. FC Nürnberg	1–0	Eintracht Braunschweig	Nuremberg
20:30 UTC+1	Tzimas 49'	Report		Stadium: Max-Morlock-Stadion; Attendance: 30,676; Referee: Patrick Schwengers

18 January 2025 18	Eintracht Braunschweig	0–0	Schalke 04	Braunschweig
13:00 UTC+1		Report		Stadium: Eintracht-Stadion; Attendance: 22,389; Referee: Florian Lechner

24 January 2025 19	1. FC Magdeburg	1–1	Eintracht Braunschweig	Magdeburg
18:30 UTC+1	Atik 5'	Report	Tempelmann 69' (pen.)	Stadium: Avnet Arena; Attendance: 27,863; Referee: Robin Braun

1 February 2025 20	Eintracht Braunschweig	1–2	1. FC Köln	Braunschweig
13:00 UTC+1	Bičakčić 1'	Report	Martel 13'; Downs 30'	Stadium: Eintracht-Stadion; Attendance: 21,864; Referee: Lars Erbst

9 February 2025 21	Karlsruher SC	0–2	Eintracht Braunschweig	Karlsruhe
13:30 UTC+1		Report	Szabó 36' (pen.); Tempelmann 74'	Stadium: Wildparkstadion; Attendance: 27,152; Referee: Eric Weisbach

15 February 2025 22	Eintracht Braunschweig	1–0	Darmstadt 98	Braunschweig
13:00 UTC+1	Tempelmann 60'	Report		Stadium: Eintracht-Stadion; Attendance: 18,714; Referee: Max Burda

23 February 2025 23	Greuther Fürth	3–0	Eintracht Braunschweig	Fürth
13:30 UTC+1	Futkeu 10'; Green 88'; Consbruch 90+8'	Report		Stadium: Sportpark Ronhof; Attendance: 11,032; Referee: Wolfgang Haslberger

1 March 2025 24	Eintracht Braunschweig	1–1	SSV Ulm	Braunschweig
13:00 UTC+1	Polter 85'	Report	Röser 11'	Stadium: Eintracht-Stadion; Attendance: 19,615; Referee: Florian Heft

9 March 2025 25	Hannover 96	1–1	Eintracht Braunschweig	Hannover
13:30 UTC+1	Knight 90+3'	Report	Tempelmann 77'	Stadium: Heinz von Heiden Arena; Attendance: 32,100; Referee: Matthias Jöllenbeck

16 March 2025 26	Eintracht Braunschweig	1–5	Hertha BSC	Braunschweig
13:30 UTC+1	Tempelmann 90+1'	Report	Reese 8', 69'; Scherhant 42'; Nikolaou 44' (o.g.); Winkler 90+3'	Stadium: Eintracht-Stadion; Attendance: 22,613; Referee: Florian Badstübner

30 March 2025 27	Preußen Münster	1–1	Eintracht Braunschweig	Münster
13:30 UTC+2	Lorenz 4' (pen.)	Report	Tachie 1'	Stadium: Preußenstadion; Attendance: 12,422; Referee: Eric Weisbach

4 April 2025 28	Eintracht Braunschweig	3–2	SC Paderborn	Braunschweig
18:30 UTC+2	Tachie 44'; Philippe 71'; Bell Bell 78'	Report	Bilbija 26'; Grimaldi 48'	Stadium: Eintracht-Stadion; Attendance: 20,283; Referee: Patrick Schwengers

11 April 2025 29	Hamburger SV	2–4	Eintracht Braunschweig	Hamburg
18:30 UTC+2	Selke 74', 90+5'	Report	Bell Bell 40'; Hefti 42' (o.g.); Baas 84'; Philippe 85'	Stadium: Volksparkstadion; Attendance: 57,000; Referee: Felix Brych

19 April 2025 30	Eintracht Braunschweig	2–0	1. FC Kaiserslautern	Braunschweig
13:00 UTC+2	Tempelmann 51'; Philippe 53'	Report		Stadium: Eintracht-Stadion; Attendance: 22,651; Referee: Patrick Hempel

26 April 2025 31	Jahn Regensburg	1–1	Eintracht Braunschweig	Regensburg
13:00 UTC+2	Ziegele 4'	Report	Nikolaou 6'	Stadium: Jahnstadion Regensburg; Attendance: 13,773; Referee: Lars Erbst

3 May 2025 32	Eintracht Braunschweig	2–2	Fortuna Düsseldorf	Braunschweig
13:00 UTC+2	Jaeckel 22'; Philippe 52'	Report	Gavory 47'; Zimmermann 72'	Stadium: Eintracht-Stadion; Attendance: 23,605; Referee: Daniel Schlager

10 May 2025 33	SV Elversberg	3–0	Eintracht Braunschweig	Spiesen-Elversberg
13:00 UTC+2	Asllani 11'; Damar 18', 21'	Report		Stadium: Waldstadion an der Kaiserlinde; Attendance: 9,105; Referee: Timo Gansloweit

18 May 2025 34	Eintracht Braunschweig	1–3	1. FC Nürnberg	Braunschweig
15:30 UTC+2	Polter 90'	Report	Emreli 10', 20', 45+1'; Justvan 31'	Stadium: Eintracht-Stadion; Attendance: 22,917; Referee: Sven Jablonski

=== Relegation play-offs ===
23 May 2025 First leg	1. FC Saarbrücken	0–2	Eintracht Braunschweig	Saarbrücken
20:30 UTC+2		Report	Tempelmann 49'; Rittmüller 61'	Stadium: Ludwigsparkstadion; Attendance: 15,012; Referee: Tobias Welz

27 May 2025 Second leg	Eintracht Braunschweig	2–2 (a.e.t.)	1. FC Saarbrücken	Braunschweig
20:30 UTC+2	Di Michele Sanchez 105+2'; Philippe 120'	Report	Krüger 66' (pen.); Brünker 83'	Stadium: Eintracht-Stadion; Attendance: 21,854; Referee: Tobias Stieler

=== DFB-Pokal ===
19 August 2024 First round	Eintracht Braunschweig	1–4	Eintracht Frankfurt	Braunschweig
20:45	Szabó 89'	Report	Chaïbi 52'; Ekitike 56', 61'; Matanović 88'	Stadium: Eintracht-Stadion; Attendance: 21,201; Referee: Florian Exner
