= Sidi Sané =

German footballer (born 2003)

Personal information
- Date of birth: 21 April 2003 (age 23)
- Place of birth: Essen, Germany
- Height: 1.87 m (6 ft 2 in)
- Position: Winger

Team information
- Current team: Eintracht Braunschweig
- Number: 24

Youth career
- 2008–2009: Wattenscheid 09
- 2009–2011: Bayer Leverkusen
- 2011–2022: Schalke 04

Senior career*
| Years | Team | Apps | (Gls) |
| 2022–2023 | Schalke 04 II | 26 | (7) |
| 2022 | Schalke 04 | 1 | (0) |
| 2023– | Eintracht Braunschweig | 33 | (2) |
- * Club domestic league appearances and goals as of 18 May 2026

Sidi Sané (born 21 April 2003) is a German professional footballer who plays as a winger for 2. Bundesliga club Eintracht Braunschweig.

== Career ==
Sané made his professional debut for Schalke 04 in the DFB-Pokal on 31 July 2022, coming on as a substitute in the 73rd minute in a 5–0 away win against Bremer SV. He made his Bundesliga debut in a 2–0 home defeat against Bayern Munich on 11 December 2022.

On 20 July 2023, he joined Eintracht Braunschweig on a two-year contract.

== Personal life ==
Sané is the younger brother of German international player Leroy Sané, who also started his professional football career at Schalke 04, and the son of former German rhythmic gymnast and 1984 Summer Olympics bronze medalist Regina Weber, and former footballer and Senegalese international Souleymane Sané.

== Career statistics ==
As of 8 Feb 2026.

Appearances and goals by club, season and competition
| Club | Season | League | | | Cup | | Other | | Total | |
| Club | Season | Division | Apps | Goals | Apps | Goals | Apps | Goals | Apps | Goals |
|---|---|---|---|---|---|---|---|---|---|---|
| Schalke 04 II | 2021–22 | Regionalliga West | 1 | 0 | — | | 0 | 0 | 1 | 0 |
| Schalke 04 II | 2022–23 | Regionalliga West | 25 | 7 | — | | 0 | 0 | 25 | 7 |
| Schalke 04 II | Total | | 26 | 7 | — | | 0 | 0 | 26 | 7 |
| Schalke 04 | 2022–23 | Bundesliga | 1 | 0 | 1 | 0 | 0 | 0 | 2 | 0 |
| Eintracht Braunschweig | 2023–24 | 2. Bundesliga | 10 | 0 | 0 | 0 | 0 | 0 | 10 | 0 |
| Eintracht Braunschweig | 2024–25 | 2. Bundesliga | 0 | 0 | 0 | 0 | 1 | 0 | 1 | 0 |
| Eintracht Braunschweig | 2025–26 | 2. Bundesliga | 16 | 2 | 0 | 0 | 0 | 0 | 12 | 1 |
| Eintracht Braunschweig | Total | | 26 | 2 | — | | 1 | 0 | 27 | 2 |
| Career total | | | 53 | 9 | 1 | 0 | 1 | 0 | 55 | 9 |
