= Lino Tempelmann =

German footballer (born 1999)

Personal information
- Date of birth: 2 February 1999 (age 27)
- Place of birth: Munich, Germany
- Height: 1.75 m (5 ft 9 in)
- Position: Midfielder

Team information
- Current team: Eintracht Braunschweig
- Number: 20

Youth career
- 2008–2013: Bayern Munich
- 2013–2014: SpVgg Unterhaching
- 2014–2017: 1860 Munich
- 2017–2018: SC Freiburg

Senior career*
Years	Team	Apps	(Gls)
2017	1860 Munich II	1	(1)
2017	1860 Munich	6	(0)
2018–2021	SC Freiburg II	21	(0)
2019–2023	SC Freiburg	11	(0)
2021–2023	→ 1. FC Nürnberg (loan)	62	(6)
2023–	Schalke 04	27	(1)
2024	Schalke 04 II	1	(0)
2025	→ Eintracht Braunschweig (loan)	16	(6)
2025–	Eintracht Braunschweig	15	(1)

International career
2019	Germany U20	3	(0)
- * Club domestic league appearances and goals as of 18 May 2026

Lino Tempelmann (born 2 February 1999) is a German professional footballer who plays as a midfielder for 2. Bundesliga club Eintracht Braunschweig.

== Career ==
Tempelmann made his professional debut with SC Freiburg in a 2–1 Bundesliga win over RB Leipzig on 26 October 2019.

On 14 July 2023, he joined Schalke 04, signing a three-year contract. On 6 January 2025, he was loaned to Eintracht Braunschweig until the end of the season. On 21 June 2025, the move was made permanent.

== Career statistics ==
As of match played 27 May 2025

Appearances and goals by club, season and competition
Club	Season	League			DFB-Pokal		Other		Total	
Club	Season	Division	Apps	Goals	Apps	Goals	Apps	Goals	Apps	Goals
1860 Munich II	2017–18	Bayernliga	1	1	—		—		1	1
1860 Munich	2017–18	Regionalliga Bayern	6	0	0	0	—		6	0
SC Freiburg II	2018–19	Regionalliga Südwest	8	0	—		—		8	0
SC Freiburg II	2019–20	Regionalliga Südwest	6	0	—		—		6	0
SC Freiburg II	2020–21	Regionalliga Südwest	7	0	—		—		7	0
SC Freiburg II	Total		21	0	—		—		21	0
SC Freiburg	2019–20	Bundesliga	1	0	0	0	—		1	0
SC Freiburg	2020–21	Bundesliga	10	0	1	0	—		11	0
SC Freiburg	Total		11	0	1	0	—		12	0
1. FC Nürnberg (loan)	2021–22	2. Bundesliga	31	4	1	0	—		32	4
1. FC Nürnberg (loan)	2022–23	2. Bundesliga	31	2	3	0	—		34	2
1. FC Nürnberg (loan)	Total		62	6	4	0	—		66	6
Schalke 04	2023–24	2. Bundesliga	22	1	1	0	—		23	1
Schalke 04	2024–25	2. Bundesliga	5	0	0	0	—		5	0
Schalke 04	Total		27	1	1	0	—		28	1
Schalke 04 II	2024–25	Regionalliga West	1	0	—		—		1	0
Eintracht Braunschweig (loan)	2024–25	2. Bundesliga	16	6	—		2 (Note: Appearances in 2. Bundesliga relegation play-offs.)	1	18	7
Career total			145	14	6	0	2	1	153	15
