= Levente Szabó =

Hungarian footballer (born 1999)

Personal information
- Date of birth: 6 June 1999 (age 27)
- Place of birth: Székesfehérvár, Hungary
- Height: 1.95 m (6 ft 5 in)
- Position: Centre-forward

Team information
- Current team: Zagłębie Lubin
- Number: 17

Youth career
- 2009–2012: Főnix-Gold
- 2012–2015: Győr
- 2015–2017: Atalanta
- 2017–2019: Genoa

Senior career*
Years	Team	Apps	(Gls)
2019–2024	Fehérvár	42	(5)
2019	→ Budaörs (loan)	5	(1)
2021–2022	→ Budafok (loan)	21	(6)
2022	→ Kecskemét (loan)	16	(4)
2024	→ Diósgyőr (loan)	12	(3)
2024–2026	Eintracht Braunschweig	38	(5)
2026–	Zagłębie Lubin	19	(4)

International career^{‡}
2014	Hungary U16	1	(0)
2015	Hungary U17	2	(0)
2016	Hungary U18	5	(1)
2016–2017	Hungary U19	7	(3)
2024–	Hungary	2	(0)
- * Club domestic league appearances and goals as of 18:19, 16 August 2026 (UTC) ‡ National team caps and goals as of 17:42, 29 May 2026 (UTC)

Levente Szabó (born 6 June 1999) is a Hungarian professional footballer who plays as a centre-forward for Polish Ekstraklasa club Zagłębie Lubin and the Hungary national team.

== Club career ==
On 31 August 2021, Szabó was loaned to Budafoki MTE for the season. On 14 February 2024, Szabó moved on loan to Diósgyőr.

On 24 May 2024, Szabó signed a two-year contract with Eintracht Braunschweig in German 2. Bundesliga. He scored his first goal in 1–1 draw against Darmstadt 98 on 14 September 2024. On 18 October 2024, he scored a goal in a 3–1 defeat against Hertha BSC.

On 28 January 2026, Szabó moved to Zagłębie Lubin in Poland on a one-and-a-half-year contract.

== International career ==
Szabó made his Hungary national team debut on 16 November 2024 in a Nations League game against the Netherlands. He substituted Barnabás Varga in the 60th minute as the Netherlands won 4–0.

== Career statistics ==
=== Club ===
As of match played 23 May 2026

Appearances and goals by club, season and competition
Club	Season	League			National cup (Note: Includes Magyar Kupa, DFB-Pokal)		Continental		Other		Total	
Club	Season	Division	Apps	Goals	Apps	Goals	Apps	Goals	Apps	Goals	Apps	Goals
Fehérvár	2019–20	Nemzeti Bajnokság I	3	0	0	0	0	0	—		3	0
Fehérvár	2020–21	Nemzeti Bajnokság I	13	1	1	0	0	0	—		14	1
Fehérvár	2021–22	Nemzeti Bajnokság I	4	0	0	0	1 (Note: Appearance in UEFA Europa Conference League)	0	—		5	0
Fehérvár	2022–23	Nemzeti Bajnokság I	6	0	0	0	0	0	—		6	0
Fehérvár	2023–24	Nemzeti Bajnokság I	16	4	0	0	—		—		16	4
Fehérvár	Total		42	5	1	0	1	0	0	0	44	5
Budaörs (loan)	2019–20	Nemzeti Bajnokság II	5	1	0	0	—		—		5	1
Budafok (loan)	2021–22	Nemzeti Bajnokság II	21	6	—		—		—		21	6
Kecskemét (loan)	2022–23	Nemzeti Bajnokság I	16	4	1	0	—		—		17	4
Diósgyőr (loan)	2023–24	Nemzeti Bajnokság I	12	3	2	1	—		—		14	4
Eintracht Braunschweig	2024–25	2. Bundesliga	25	4	1	1	—		2 (Note: Appearances in 2. Bundesliga promotion play-offs)	0	28	5
Eintracht Braunschweig	2025–26	2. Bundesliga	13	1	1	0	—		—		14	1
Eintracht Braunschweig	Total		38	5	2	1	—		2	0	42	6
Zagłębie Lubin	2025–26	Ekstraklasa	16	3	—		—		—		16	3
Career total			150	27	6	2	1	0	2	0	159	29

=== International ===
As of match played 20 March 2025

Appearances and goals by national team and year
National team	Year	Apps	Goals
Hungary	2024	1	0
Hungary	2025	1	0
Total		2	0

== Honours ==
Individual

- Nemzeti Bajnokság I Goal of the Month: November 2023
