= 2021–22 1. FC Nürnberg season =

1. FC Nürnberg
2021–22 season
- Board Member: Dieter Hecking (sports); Niels Rossow (financial)
- Head coach: Robert Klauß
- Stadium: Max-Morlock-Stadion
- 2. Bundesliga: 8th
- DFB-Pokal: Second round
- Top goalscorer: League: Nikola Dovedan (7); All: Nikola Dovedan (7)
Home colours	Away colours	Third colours

The 2021–22 1. FC Nürnberg season was the club's 122nd season in existence and the club's third consecutive season in the second flight of German football. In addition to the domestic league, 1. FC Nürnberg participated in this season's edition of the DFB-Pokal. The season covers the period from 1 July 2021 to 30 June 2022.

== Players ==
=== Current squad ===
As of 30 June 2021

Note: Flags indicate national team as defined under FIFA eligibility rules; some limited exceptions apply. Players may hold more than one non-FIFA nationality.

No.	Pos.	Nation	Player
1	GK	(Germany) GER	Patric Klandt
2	DF	(Germany) GER	Kilian Fischer
4	DF	(Denmark) DEN	Asger Sørensen
5	MF	(Germany) GER	Johannes Geis
6	MF	(Germany) GER	Lino Tempelmann (on loan from SC Freiburg)
7	FW	(Germany) GER	Felix Lohkemper
8	MF	(Germany) GER	Taylan Duman
9	FW	(Germany) GER	Manuel Schäffler
10	MF	(Austria) AUT	Nikola Dovedan
11	FW	(Germany) GER	Erik Shuranov
14	MF	(Germany) GER	Tom Krauß (on loan from RB Leipzig)
15	MF	(Germany) GER	Fabian Nürnberger
16	DF	(Germany) GER	Christopher Schindler
17	MF	(Germany) GER	Jens Castrop (on loan from 1. FC Köln)

No.	Pos.	Nation	Player
18	FW	(Germany) GER	Dennis Borkowski (on loan from RB Leipzig)
19	DF	(Germany) GER	Florian Hübner
20	FW	(Germany) GER	Pascal Köpke
21	MF	(Germany) GER	Tim Latteier
22	DF	(Germany) GER	Enrico Valentini (captain)
24	MF	(Norway) NOR	Mats Møller Dæhli
26	FW	(Germany) GER	Paul-Philipp Besong
29	DF	(Germany) GER	Tim Handwerker
31	GK	(Germany) GER	Carl Klaus
33	DF	(Croatia) CRO	Mario Šuver
34	DF	(Russia) RUS	Konstantin Rausch
35	DF	(Germany) GER	Noel Knothe
36	FW	(Germany) GER	Lukas Schleimer

=== Out on loan ===
Note: Flags indicate national team as defined under FIFA eligibility rules; some limited exceptions apply. Players may hold more than one non-FIFA nationality.

No.	Pos.	Nation	Player
—	MF	(Slovenia) SVN	Adam Gnezda Čerin (at HNK Rijeka until 30 June 2022)
—	DF	(Germany) GER	Linus Rosenlöcher (at Esbjerg fB until 30 June 2022)

== Pre-season and friendlies ==
Win Draw Loss Fixtures

26 June 2021 Friendly	1. FC Nürnberg	5–1	FSV Zwickau	Nuremberg
14:00 CEST (UTC+2)		Report		Stadium: Sportpark Valznerweiher; Attendance: 0 Referee: Michael Bacher

3 July 2021 Friendly	FC Wacker Innsbruck	1–3	1. FC Nürnberg	Innsbruck, Austria
15:00 CEST (UTC+2)		Report		Stadium: Tivoli Neu; Attendance: 0

10 July 2021 Friendly	1. FC Nürnberg	0–0	FK Krasnodar	Jenbach, Austria
14:00 CEST (UTC+2)		Report		Stadium: Stadion Jenbach; Attendance: 250

17 July 2021 Friendly	1. FC Nürnberg	3–2	TSV 1860 Munich	Nuremberg
13:00 CEST (UTC+2)		Report		Stadium: Max-Morlock-Stadion; Attendance: 4000

2 September 2021 Friendly	VfB Stuttgart	3–0	1. FC Nürnberg	Stuttgart
15:00 CEST (UTC+2)		Report		Stadium: Robert-Schlienz-Stadion; Attendance: 0

8 October 2021 Friendly	1. FC Nürnberg	0–7	FC Ingolstadt 04	Nuremberg
11:00 CEST (UTC+2)		Report		Stadium: Sportpark Valznerweiher; Attendance: 0 Referee: Patrick Hanslbauer

11 November 2021 Friendly	1. FC Nürnberg	2–0	SCR Altach	Nuremberg
13:30 CEST (UTC+2)		Report		Stadium: Sportpark Valznerweiher; Attendance: 0

8 January 2022 Friendly	1. FC Nürnberg	5–1	Hallescher FC	Nuremberg
13:30		Report		Stadium: Max-Morlock-Stadion; Attendance: 0

27 January 2022 Friendly	1. FC Nürnberg	9–0	1. FK Příbram	Nuremberg
14:00		Report		Stadium: Sportpark Valznerweiher; Attendance: 0

24 March 2022 Friendly	Eintracht Frankfurt	1–1	1. FC Nürnberg	Frankfurt
14:00		Report		Stadium: Trainingsgelände am Waldstadion; Attendance: 0 Referee: Robert Kampka

== Competitions ==
=== Overview ===
Competition	First match	Last match	Starting round	Final position	Record							
Competition	First match	Last match	Starting round	Final position	Pld	W	D	L	GF	GA	GD	Win %
2. Bundesliga	25 July 2021	15 May 2022	Matchday 1	8th	34	14	9	11	49	49	+0	41.18
DFB-Pokal	7 August 2021	26 October 2021	First round	Second round	2	1	1	0	2	1	+1	50.00
Total					36	15	10	11	51	50	+1	41.67

Last updated: 2 December 2021
Source: Competitions

=== 2. Bundesliga ===
==== League table ====
Pos	Team	Pld	W	D	L	GF	GA	GD	Pts
6	1. FC Heidenheim	34	15	7	12	43	45	−2	52
7	SC Paderborn	34	13	12	9	56	44	+12	51
8	1. FC Nürnberg	34	14	9	11	49	49	0	51
9	Holstein Kiel	34	12	9	13	46	54	−8	45
10	Fortuna Düsseldorf	34	11	11	12	45	42	+3	44

Source: DFB
Rules for classification: 1) Points; 2) Goal difference; 3) Goals scored; 4) Head-to-head points; 5) Head-to-head goal difference; 6) Head-to-head away goals scored; 7) Away goals scored; 8) Play-off.

==== Results summary ====
Overall								Home						Away					
Pld	W	D	L	GF	GA	GD	Pts	W	D	L	GF	GA	GD	W	D	L	GF	GA	GD
34	14	9	11	49	49	0	51	8	3	6	26	23	+3	6	6	5	23	26	−3

Last updated: September 2021.

==== Results by round ====
Round	1	2	3	4	5	6	7	8	9	10	11	12	13	14	15	16	17	18	19	20	21	22	23	24	25	26	27	28	29	30	31	32	33	34
Ground	H	A	H	A	H	A	H	A	H	A	H	A	H	A	H	H	A	A	H	A	H	A	H	A	H	A	H	A	H	A	H	A	A	H
Result	D	D	W	D	W	D	W	D	D	W	W	L	L	W	L	W	L	W	L	W	L	L	W	W	W	W	D	L	W	D	L	D	L	L
Position	9	11	6	6	5	6	4	5	5	5	4	5	6	5	7	5	7	5	9	7	7	7	7	6	4	4	5	5	5	5	6	6	7	8

Updated to match(es) played on July 2021. Source:
A = Away; H = Home; W = Win; D = Draw; L = Loss

==== Matches ====
25 July 2021 1	1. FC Nürnberg	0–0	FC Erzgebirge Aue	Nuremberg
13:30		Report		Stadium: Max-Morlock-Stadion; Attendance: 11,089; Referee: Sven Waschitzki; Man of the Match: Geis

30 July 2021 2	SC Paderborn 07	2–2	1. FC Nürnberg	Paderborn
18:30	Heuer 18'; Michel 85'	Report	Dæhli 54'; Schäffler 58'	Stadium: Benteler-Arena; Attendance: 5,000 (sell-out); Referee: Sven Jablonski; Man of the Match: Møller Dæhli

14 August 2021 3	1. FC Nürnberg	2–0	Fortuna Düsseldorf	Nuremberg
13:30	Schindler 59'; Valentini 90+8' (pen.)	Report		Stadium: Max-Morlock-Stadion; Attendance: 12,361; Referee: Robert Schröder; Man of the Match: Schindler

22 August 2021 4	FC Ingolstadt 04	0–0	1. FC Nürnberg	Ingolstadt
13:30		Report		Stadium: Audi Sportpark; Attendance: 3,533 (sell-out); Referee: Felix Brych; Man of the Match: Linsmayer

27 August 2021 5	1. FC Nürnberg	2–1	Karlsruher SC	Nuremberg
18:30	Tempelmann 50'; Shuranov 74'	Report	Batmaz 82'	Stadium: Max-Morlock-Stadion; Attendance: 13,120; Referee: Patrick Alt; Man of the Match: Schindler

12 September 2021 6	SSV Jahn Regensburg	2–2	1. FC Nürnberg	Regensburg
13:30	Besuschkow 38'; Wekesser 53'	Report	Tempelmann 19'; Dovedan 79'	Stadium: Jahnstadion; Attendance: 10,105 (sell-out); Referee: Daniel Schlager; Man of the Match: Besuschkow

17 September 2021 7	1. FC Nürnberg	1–0	Hansa Rostock	Nuremberg
18:30	Shuranov 59'	Report		Stadium: Max-Morlock-Stadion; Attendance: 25,000 (sell-out); Referee: Robin Braun; Man of the Match: Mathenia

26 September 2021 8	Hamburger SV	2–2	1. FC Nürnberg	Hamburg
13:30	Glatzel 34', 80'	Report	Valentini 22' (pen.); Tempelmann 46'	Stadium: Volksparkstadion; Attendance: 21,337; Referee: Felix Zwayer; Man of the Match: Glatzel

2 October 2021 9	1. FC Nürnberg	0–0	Hannover 96	Nuremberg
20:30		Report		Stadium: Max-Morlock-Stadion; Attendance: 24,211; Referee: Tobias Reichel; Man of the Match: Tempelmann

17 October 2021 10	Dynamo Dresden	0–1	1. FC Nürnberg	Dresden
13:30		Report	Krauß 21'	Stadium: Rudolf-Harbig-Stadion; Attendance: 16,000 (sell-out); Referee: Marco Fritz; Man of the Match: Krauß

23 October 2021 11	1. FC Nürnberg	4–0	1. FC Heidenheim	Nuremberg
13:30	Dæhli 45'; Shuranov 52'; Geis 66'; Malone 89' (ogg.)	Report		Stadium: Max-Morlock-Stadion; Attendance: 23,056; Referee: Thorben Siever; Man of the Match: Tempelmann

29 October 2021 12	SV Darmstadt 98	2–0	1. FC Nürnberg	Darmstadt
18:30	Pfeiffer 11'; Schindler 59' (ogg.)	Report		Stadium: Stadion am Böllenfalltor; Attendance: 13,000 (sell-out); Referee: Sascha Stegemann; Man of the Match: Isherwood

5 November 2021 13	1. FC Nürnberg	1–2	Werder Bremen	Nuremberg
18:30	Dovedan 19'	Report	Füllkrug 80'; Bittencourt 88'	Stadium: Max-Morlock-Stadion; Attendance: 25,000 (sell-out); Referee: Tobias Welz; Man of the Match: Mathenia

19 November 2021 14	SV Sandhausen	1–2	1. FC Nürnberg	Sandhausen
18:30	Höhn 66'	Report	Nürnberger 83'; Shuranov 90+3'	Stadium: BWT-Stadion am Hardtwald; Attendance: 4,617; Referee: Florian Lechner; Man of the Match: Mathenia

28 November 2021 15	1. FC Nürnberg	2–3	FC St. Pauli	Nuremberg
13:30	Geis 21'; Schäffler 72'	Report	Burgstaller 3'; Paqarada 10'; Dźwigała 64'	Stadium: Max-Morlock-Stadion; Attendance: 8,479; Referee: Sven Waschitzki; Man of the Match: Vasilj

4 December 2021 16	1. FC Nürnberg	2–1	Holstein Kiel	Nuremberg
13:30	Schäffler 6'; Shuranov 63'	Report	Korb 88'	Stadium: Max-Morlock-Stadion; Attendance: 0 Referee: Alexander Sather; Man of the Match: Schäffler

10 December 2021 17	FC Schalke 04	4–1	1. FC Nürnberg	Gelsenkirchen
18:30	Ouwejan 20'; Schäffler 66' (ogg.); Churlinov 85'; Itakura 90+4'	Report	Nürnberger 49'	Stadium: Veltins-Arena; Attendance: 15,000 (sell-out); Referee: Tobias Reichel; Man of the Match: Churlinov

18 December 2021 18	FC Erzgebirge Aue	1–3	1. FC Nürnberg	Aue
13:30	Hochscheidt 8'	Report	Dovedan 2', 22', 81'	Stadium: Erzgebirgsstadion; Attendance: 0 Referee: Martin Thomsen; Man of the Match: Dovedan

15 January 2022 19	1. FC Nürnberg	1–2	SC Paderborn 07	Nuremberg
13:30	Dæhli 60'	Report	Michel 41'; Platte 44'	Stadium: Max-Morlock-Stadion; Attendance: 0 Referee: Matthias Jöllenbeck; Man of the Match: Michel

21 January 2022 20	Fortuna Düsseldorf	0–1	1. FC Nürnberg	Düsseldorf
18:30		Report	Tempelmann 2'	Stadium: Merkur Spiel-Arena; Attendance: 750; Referee: Robert Hartmann; Man of the Match: Tempelmann

4 February 2022 21	1. FC Nürnberg	0–5	FC Ingolstadt 04	Nuremberg
18:30		Report	Pick 13'; Eckert Ayensa 17'; Bilbija 41'; Schmidt 49'; Sulejmani 80'	Stadium: Max-Morlock-Stadion; Attendance: 10,000 (sell-out); Referee: Bastian Dankert; Man of the Match: Eckert Ayensa

12 February 2022 22	Karlsruher SC	4–1	1. FC Nürnberg	Karlsruhe
13:30	Hofmann 39', 59'; Goller 55'; Wanitzek 90' (pen.)	Report	Geis 29'	Stadium: Wildparkstadion; Attendance: 9,265; Referee: Sven Waschitzki; Man of the Match: Hofmann

19 February 2022 23	1. FC Nürnberg	2–0	SSV Jahn Regensburg	Nuremberg
20:30	Köpke 35'; Duman 55'	Report		Stadium: Max-Morlock-Stadion; Attendance: 23,042; Referee: Martin Petersen; Man of the Match: Dæhli

26 February 2022 24	FC Hansa Rostock	0–2	1. FC Nürnberg	Rostock
13:30		Report	Köpke 33'; Duman 63'	Stadium: Ostseestadion; Attendance: 10,000 (sell-out); Referee: Christian Dingert; Man of the Match: Duman

5 March 2022 25	1. FC Nürnberg	2–1	Hamburger SV	Nuremberg
20:30	Köpke 15'; Handwerker 88'	Report	Reis 25'	Stadium: Max-Morlock-Stadion; Attendance: 25,000 (sell-out); Referee: Matthias Jöllenbeck; Man of the Match: Fischer

13 March 2022 26	Hannover 96	0–3	1. FC Nürnberg	Hannover
13:30		Report	Schleimer 26'; Krauß 83'; Shuranov 87'	Stadium: HDI Arena; Attendance: 14,300; Referee: Dr. Robert Kampka; Man of the Match: Krauß

20 March 2022 27	1. FC Nürnberg	1–1	Dynamo Dresden	Nuremberg
13:30	Nürnberger 12'	Report	Daferner 42'	Stadium: Max-Morlock-Stadion; Attendance: 27,826; Referee: Robert Hartmann; Man of the Match: Broll

3 April 2022 28	1. FC Heidenheim	3–1	1. FC Nürnberg	Heidenheim
13:30	Kleindienst 3', 84'; Malone 36'	Report	Schäffler 88'	Stadium: Voith-Arena; Attendance: 10,673; Referee: Felix Brych; Man of the Match: Mainka

9 April 2022 29	1. FC Nürnberg	3–1	SV Darmstadt 98	Nuremberg
20:30	Dovedan 43'; Schleimer 82'; Leipold 90+6' (ogg.)	Report	Pfeiffer 58'	Stadium: Max-Morlock-Stadion; Attendance: 30,471; Referee: Timo Gerach; Man of the Match: Schleimer

17 April 2022 30	Werder Bremen	1–1	1. FC Nürnberg	Bremen
13:30	Weiser 64'	Report	Dovedan 24', pen.'	Stadium: Weserstadion; Attendance: 40,000; Referee: Christian Dingert; Man of the Match: Tempelmann

24 April 2022 31	1. FC Nürnberg	2–4	SV Sandhausen	Nuremberg
13:30	Krauß 25'; Sørensen 54'	Report	Bachmann 5'; Trybull 60', 84'; Testroet 88'	Stadium: Max-Morlock-Stadion; Attendance: 40,103; Referee: Arne Aarnink; Man of the Match: Drewes

29 April 2022 32	FC St. Pauli	1–1	1. FC Nürnberg	Hamburg
18:30	Kyereh 74', pen.'	Report	Duman 90+2'	Stadium: Millerntor-Stadion; Attendance: 29,312; Referee: Bastian Dankert; Man of the Match: Kyereh

8 May 2022 33	Holstein Kiel	3–0	1. FC Nürnberg	Kiel
13:30	Skrzybski 14'; Korb 41'; Holtby 63'	Report		Stadium: Holstein-Stadion; Attendance: 12,455; Referee: Daniel Siebert; Man of the Match: Holtby

15 May 2022 34	1. FC Nürnberg	1–2	FC Schalke 04	Nuremberg
15:30	Schleimer 86'	Report	Zalazar 15'; Terodde 88'	Stadium: Max-Morlock-Stadion; Attendance: 50,000 (sell-out); Referee: Sascha Stegemann; Man of the Match: Terodde

=== DFB-Pokal ===
7 August 2021 First round	SSV Ulm	0–1	1. FC Nürnberg	Ulm
18:30		Report	Duman 79'	Stadium: Donaustadion; Attendance: 6,743; Referee: Michael Bacher

26 October 2021 Second round	1. FC Nürnberg	1–1 (a.e.t.) (2–4 p)	Hamburger SV	Nuremberg
20:45	Duman 59'	Report	David 45'	Stadium: Max-Morlock-Stadion; Attendance: 19,267; Referee: Bastian Dankert
	Penalties
	Geis (penalty scored); Duman (penalty scored); Tempelmann (penalty missed); Sørensen (penalty missed)		(penalty scored) Kinsombi; (penalty scored) Kittel; (penalty scored) Schonlau; (penalty scored) David
