= Leroy Sané =

German footballer (born 1996)

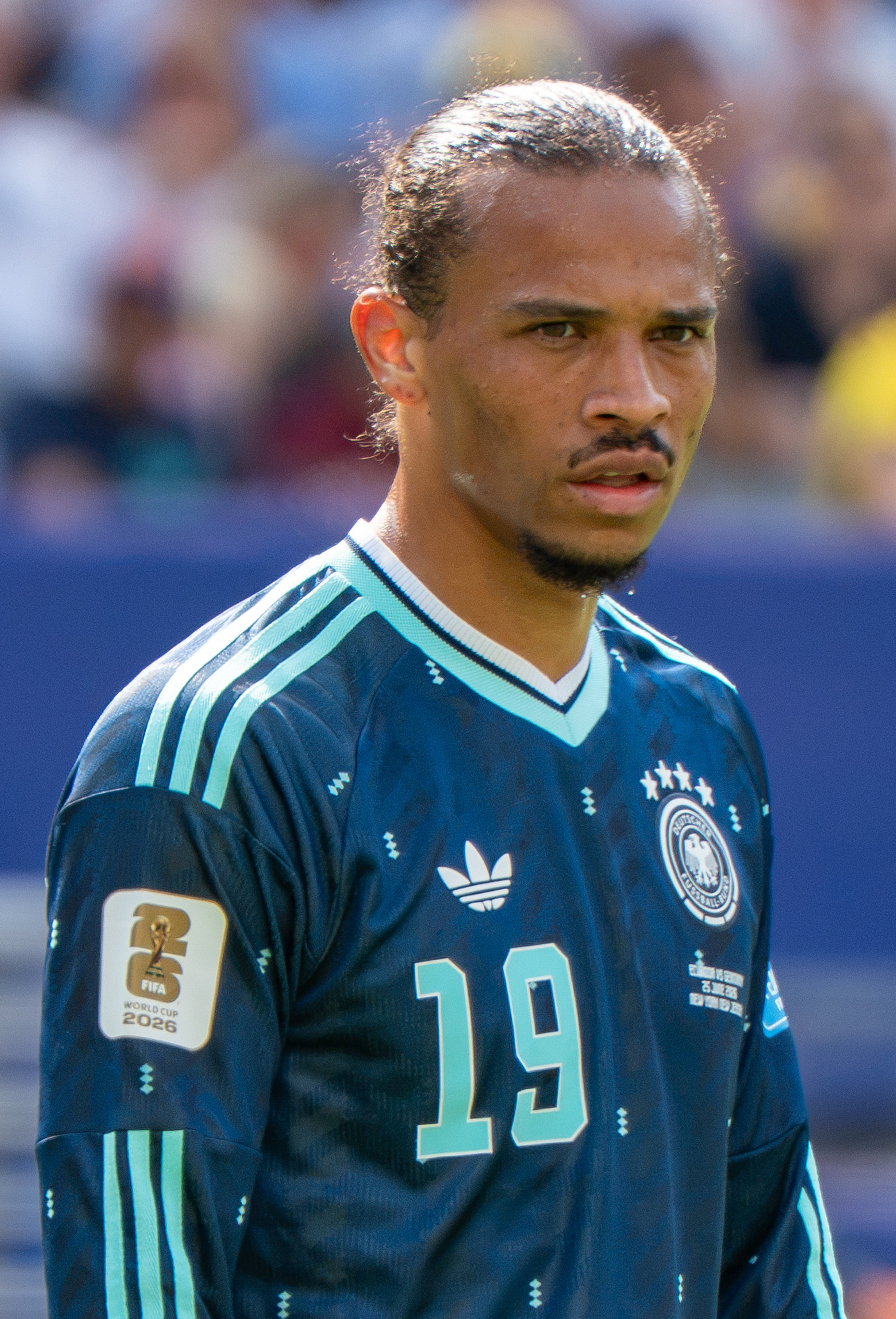
- Sané with Germany in 2026

Personal information
- Full name: Leroy Aziz Sané
- Date of birth: 11 January 1996 (age 30)
- Place of birth: Essen, Germany
- Height: 1.83 m (6 ft 0 in)
- Positions: Winger; attacking midfielder

Team information
- Current team: Galatasaray
- Number: 10

Youth career
- 2001–2005: SG Wattenscheid 09
- 2005–2008: Schalke 04
- 2008–2011: Bayer Leverkusen
- 2011–2014: Schalke 04

Senior career*
Years	Team	Apps	(Gls)
2014–2016	Schalke 04	47	(11)
2016–2020	Manchester City	90	(25)
2020–2025	Bayern Munich	153	(40)
2025–	Galatasaray	39	(7)

International career^{‡}
2014–2015	Germany U19	11	(5)
2015–2016	Germany U21	10	(5)
2015–	Germany	80	(18)
Medal record
Men's football
Representing Germany
FIFA Confederations Cup
Winner	2017 Russia
- * Club domestic league appearances and goals as of 21:28, 9 November 2026 (UTC) ‡ National team caps and goals as of 15:51, 30 June 2026 (UTC)

Leroy Aziz Sané (German pronunciation: [ˈliːʁɔʏ zaˈneː]; born 11 January 1996) is a German professional footballer who plays as a winger for Süper Lig club Galatasaray and the Germany national team.

Sané made his professional debut for Schalke 04 in 2014 and transferred to Premier League club Manchester City in 2016 for an initial £37 million fee. He was voted PFA Young Player of the Year in 2017–18, becoming the first and so far only German player to win the award, after helping City win the league and EFL Cup. In 2020, he joined Bayern Munich on a five-year deal for an initial €45 million fee.

Sané made his senior international debut for Germany in November 2015 and was part of their squad that reached the semi-finals of UEFA Euro 2016.

== Early life ==
Sané was born on 11 January 1996 in Essen and was raised near the Lohrheidestadion, Wattenscheid. He is the son of former German rhythmic gymnast and 1984 Summer Olympics bronze medalist Regina Weber, and former footballer and Senegalese international Souleymane Sané. He was named Leroy in honour of Claude Le Roy, a former head coach of his father. His father met his mother while playing professionally for SG Wattenscheid 09. Souleymane Sané was raised in France; he moved to Germany through his service in the French Army. Sané's two brothers, Kim and Sidi, have played for the youth side or second XI of major German football clubs.

== Club career ==
=== Early career ===
Sané began playing football in 2001 for the youth team of SG Wattenscheid 09. In 2005, he joined Schalke 04. Three years later, he joined Bayer Leverkusen, before returning to the Schalke youth academy (Nachwuchsleistungszentrum) in 2011.

=== Schalke 04 ===
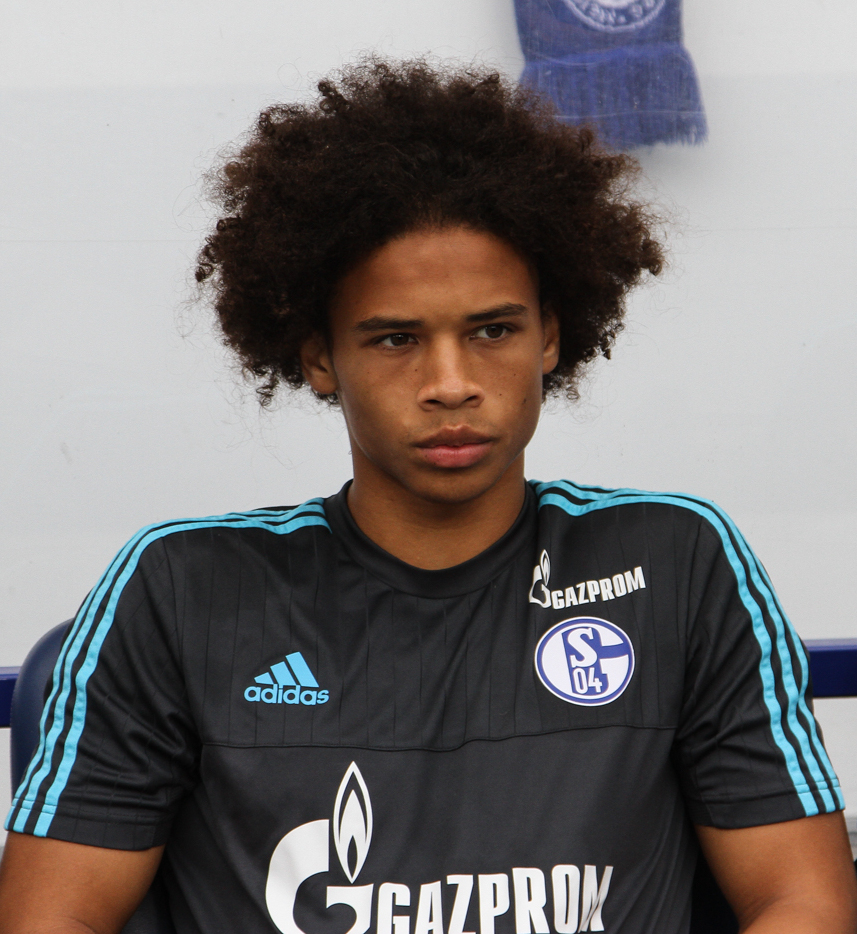
Sané with Schalke 04 in 2015

On 21 March 2014, Sané signed a three-year professional contract with Schalke ending on 30 June 2017. He made his Bundesliga debut on 20 April 2014 against VfB Stuttgart. He replaced Max Meyer after 77 minutes in a 3–1 away defeat. He scored his first goal of the season in a 2–1 home defeat to 1. FC Köln on 13 December.

On 11 March 2015, Sané scored in his first UEFA Champions League match in a 4–3 victory over Real Madrid, although his side were knocked out of the competition on 5–4 aggregate.

=== Manchester City ===
==== 2016–17: Debut season ====
On 2 August 2016, Sané joined Premier League club Manchester City, signing a five-year contract for a reported £37 million transfer fee, with performance-related add-ons potentially making the fee £46.5 million. He made his debut in a 1–2 win in the Manchester derby against Manchester United on 10 September. His first goal for City came in a 2–1 home win against Arsenal in the Premier League on 18 December. Following a spell on the sidelines due to injury, Sané made his return in a game against Tottenham Hotspur and scored in the 2–2 draw at the City of Manchester Stadium on 21 January 2017. On 28 January, he scored in a 3–0 away win over Crystal Palace in the FA Cup fourth round match.

On 21 February, Sané scored in a 5–3 comeback win over Monaco in the Champions League round of 16 first leg match. On 1 March, he scored in a 5–1 home win over Huddersfield Town in the FA Cup fifth round replay match. Four days later, on 5 March, he scored in a 2–0 away win over Sunderland. On 15 March, Sané scored in the return fixture of the Champions League tie against Monaco; however, City lost 1–3, knocking them out from the tournament on away goals. On 2 April, Sané scored the opening goal in an eventual 2–2 draw with Arsenal. On 15 April, he scored in a 3–0 win over Southampton.

In July 2017, Sané said he believed his debut season at City had been limited by his inability to breathe through his nose. He said he particularly suffered during matches, with his constantly blocked nose hampering his performance and causing him intense frustration. He opted to have corrective surgery during the off-season break. Although this caused him to miss that year's FIFA Confederations Cup, he said his chronic nasal congestion was becoming increasingly unbearable for him and that he wished to enter the next season feeling happy and healthy.

==== 2017–19: Back-to-back league titles ====
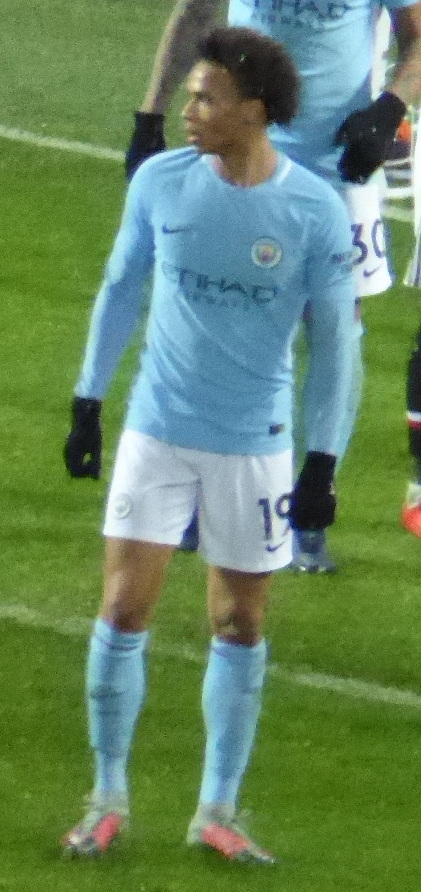
Sané with Manchester City in 2017

Sané scored his first two goals of the 2017–18 season in City's 5–0 home win against Liverpool on 9 September 2017. On 20 September, he scored twice in a 2–1 away win over West Bromwich Albion in the third-round match of the League Cup. On 23 September, he scored in a 5–0 win over Crystal Palace. On 14 October, he scored in a 7–2 win over Stoke City. On 21 October, he scored in a 3–0 win over Burnley. On 28 October, he scored in a 3–2 away win over West Bromwich Albion. After scoring and assisting once in each of his three matches, he earned the Premier League Player of the Month award for October 2017.

On 6 January 2018, he scored in a 4–1 win in the FA Cup third round over Burnley. On 14 January, he scored in a 4–3 defeat to Liverpool. Nine days later, on 23 January, he scored in a 3–2 away win over Bristol City, securing advancement into the League Cup final, in which he played 77 minutes before being substituted off as City won 3–0 over Arsenal to clinch their first trophy under Pep Guardiola. On 1 March, five days following the win in the final, he scored against Arsenal in a 3–0 league away win. On 31 March, he scored in a 3–1 away win over Everton, putting City just a win away from winning the league title. On 29 April, he scored in a 4–1 away win over West Ham United. Sané was voted the PFA Young Player of the Year for his part in Manchester City's 2017–18 Premier League title win, edging teammates Raheem Sterling and Ederson, as well as Tottenham Hotspur's Harry Kane. With 15 assists, Sané just missed out on winning the inaugural Premier League Playmaker of the Season award to teammate Kevin De Bruyne.

On 15 September 2018, Sané scored the opening goal and his first of the 2018–19 season in City's 3–0 home win against Fulham. He later scored the final goal in consecutive home match wins over Burnley and Southampton. On 24 November, Sané assisted a first-half goal for Sterling and scored a brace in a 4–0 away win over West Ham United.

On 3 January 2019, he scored the winning goal for Manchester City in the 72nd minute of the game against Liverpool, which resulted in Liverpool's first and only league defeat of the season. On 21 February 2019, Manchester City were 2–1 down in the first leg of the Champions League round of 16 tie against Sané's former club, Schalke, playing with only 10 men after Nicolás Otamendi was sent off on the 68th minute. Sané levelled the scores with a stunning free kick from just under 30 yards only seven minutes after being substituted for Sergio Agüero. He chose not to celebrate out of respect for his former club. City went on to win the game 3–2 with the winning goal scored by Raheem Sterling.

On 13 March 2019, in the second leg of the Champions League round of 16 clash against Schalke, Sané put in an incredible performance with three assists and a goal to contribute to Manchester City's 7–0 victory against his former club, sending City to the quarter-finals of the competition. On 24 April 2019, Sané scored the second and final goal in a match against Manchester United during the 66th minute to secure City a Manchester derby win. It was his first Manchester derby goal.

==== 2019–20: Injury ====
Sané was repeatedly linked with Bundesliga champions Bayern Munich to replace club staples Franck Ribéry, who was leaving the club, and retiring Arjen Robben. Despite a deal to the German side reportedly being nearly finalized, Sané was named in the starting 11 against Liverpool in the FA Community Shield. After only 10 minutes, Sané was substituted after sustaining a torn ACL, ruling him out for the majority of the season and ending talks with Bayern until his injury healed. In June 2020, Sané rejected a contract extension at Manchester City, with Guardiola stating that Sané would leave the club in the summer.

=== Bayern Munich ===
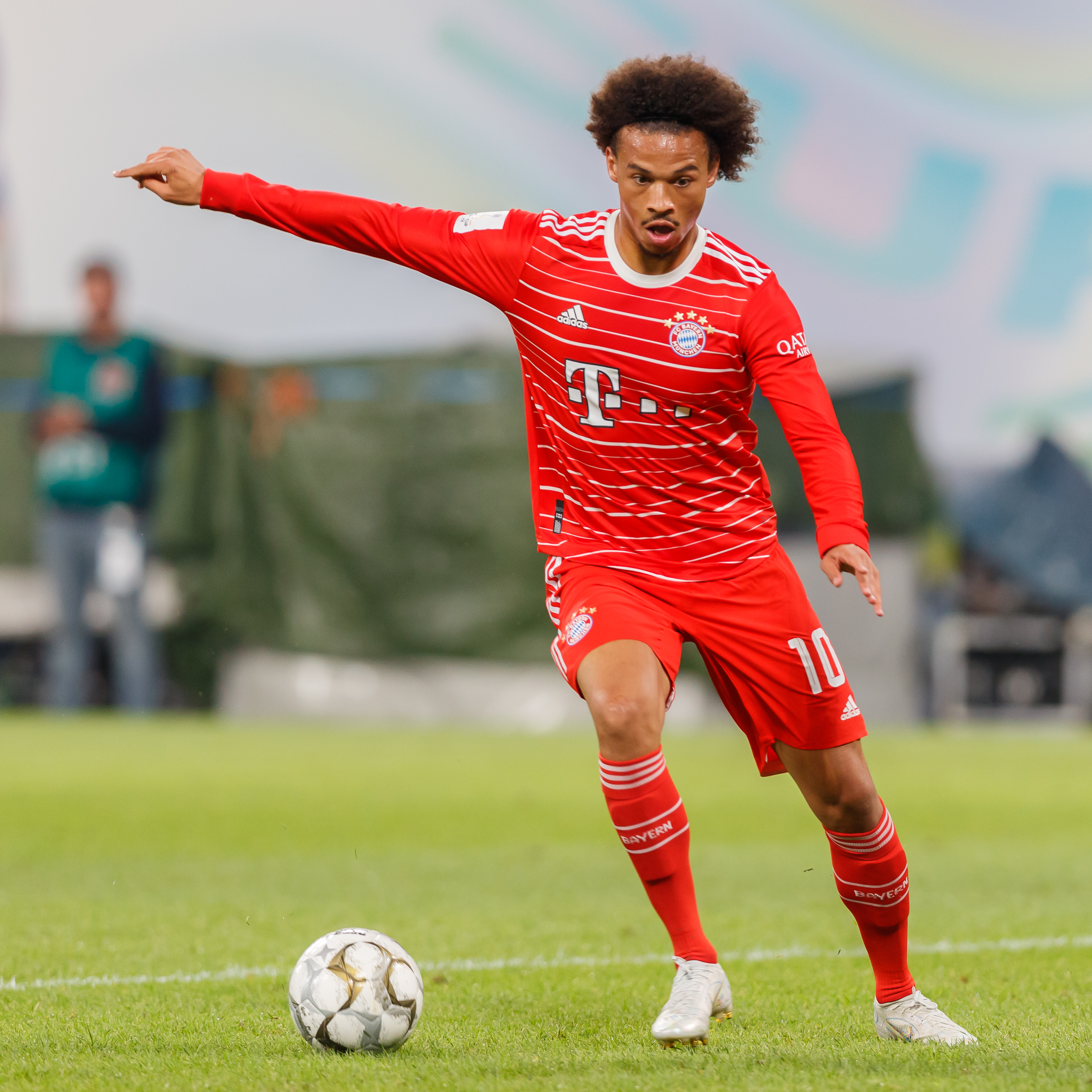
Sané with Bayern Munich in 2022

On 3 July 2020, Bayern Munich agreed to sign a five-year deal with Sané for an initial €45 million with add-ons rising to a potential €60 million. Sané scored on his second Bundesliga debut in an 8–0 win against former club Schalke 04. On 3 November 2020, Sané scored his first Champions League goal for Bayern Munich in a 6–2 away win over Red Bull Salzburg in the 2020–21 season.

In the 2021–22 Champions League season, he scored six goals and provided six assists in ten matches including three goals in two matches against Benfica. On 7 September 2022, he scored a goal and had his shot deflected to an own goal in a 2–0 away win against Inter Milan, to be awarded Player of the Match in the first encounter of the 2022–23 UEFA Champions League. A month later, on 4 October, he scored a brace in a 5–0 win over Viktoria Plzeň, to reach his 20th goal in the Champions League.

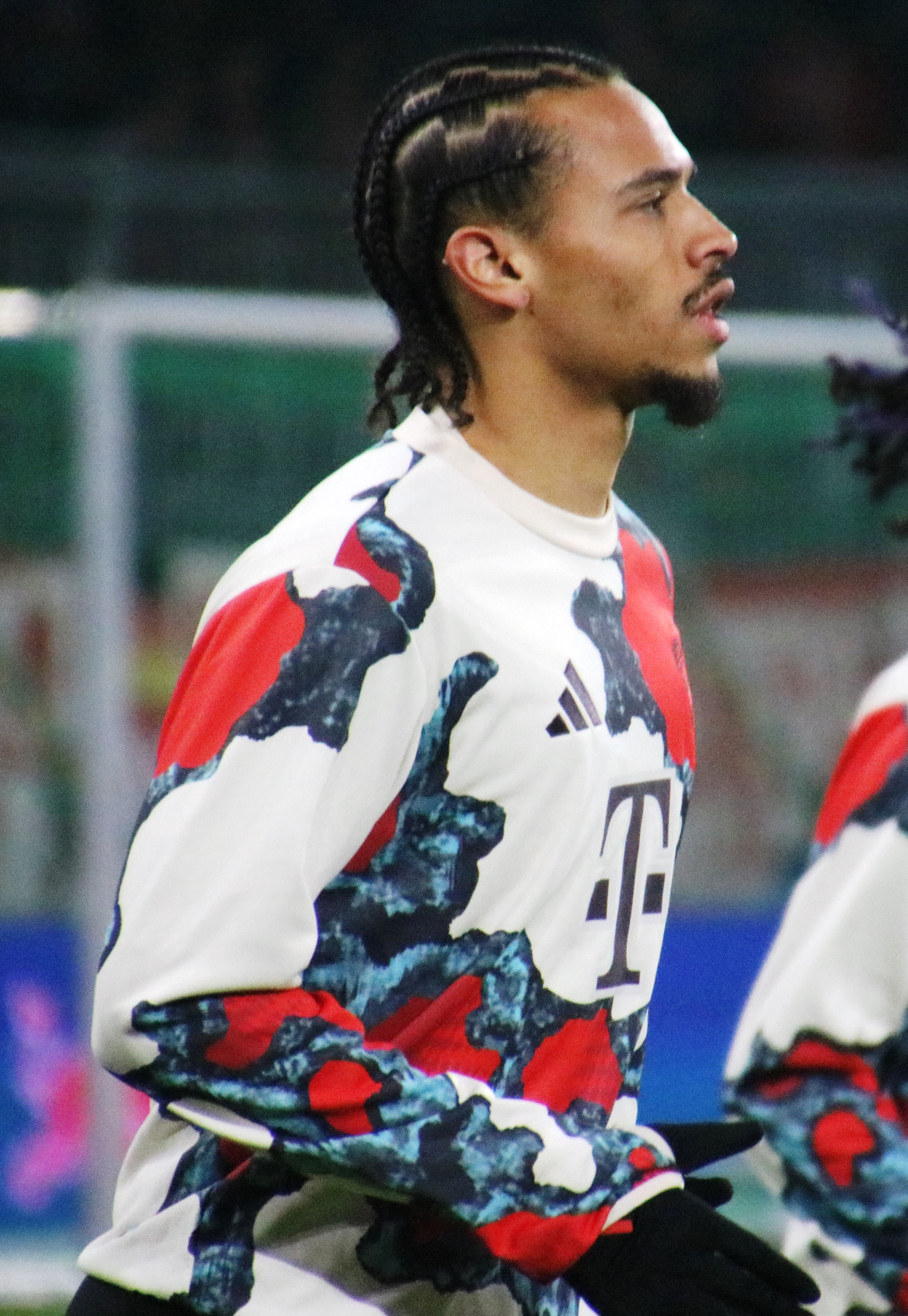
Sané training with Bayern Munich in 2025

On 20 September 2023, Sané scored the first goal in a 4–3 victory over Manchester United to be named Man of the Match in the opening fixture of the 2023–24 Champions League campaign, which was also his club's first goal in the competition for the second consecutive season against the same goalkeeper, André Onana, with two different clubs. Subsequently, he was named Bayern's Player of the Month for the previous month of August. On 30 April 2024, Sané scored Bayern's opening goal in a 2–2 draw against Real Madrid in the first leg of the UEFA Champions League semi-final. During the 2023–24 season, he suffered from a groin injury that persisted throughout the campaign and ultimately required surgery after the season ended. Sané's contract with Bayern expired on 30 June 2025; although he still competed with the team at the 2025 FIFA Club World Cup.

=== Galatasaray ===
In a statement released on 11 June 2025, Süper Lig club Galatasaray announced that they had reached an agreement with Sané, who was set to arrive in Istanbul to sign an official contract. The following day, Sané signed a three-year deal with the club. It was also confirmed that he would wear the number 10 jersey previously worn by Dries Mertens. Later that year, on 24 August, he scored his first goal for the club in a 4–0 away victory over Kayserispor.

== International career ==
=== Youth ===
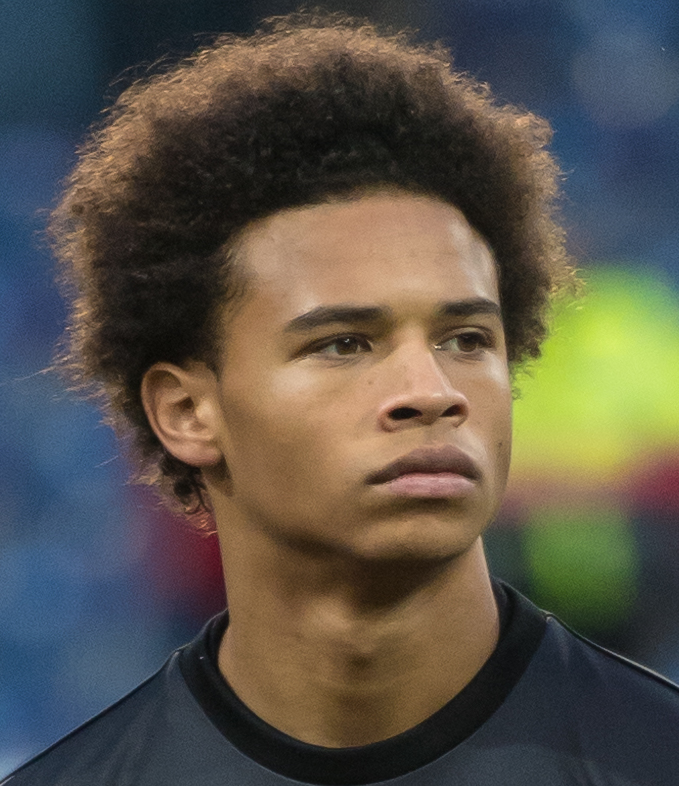
Sané with Germany U21 in 2016

Sané was first called up to the Germany under-21 team by youth coach Horst Hrubesch on 28 August 2015 for the friendly against Denmark and for the 2017 UEFA European Under-21 Championship qualifier against Azerbaijan. On 3 September 2015, he made his debut for the German U21 side in a 2–1 win at Stadion an der Lohmühle in Lübeck against Denmark, where he was replaced after 73 minutes by Julian Brandt.

=== Senior ===
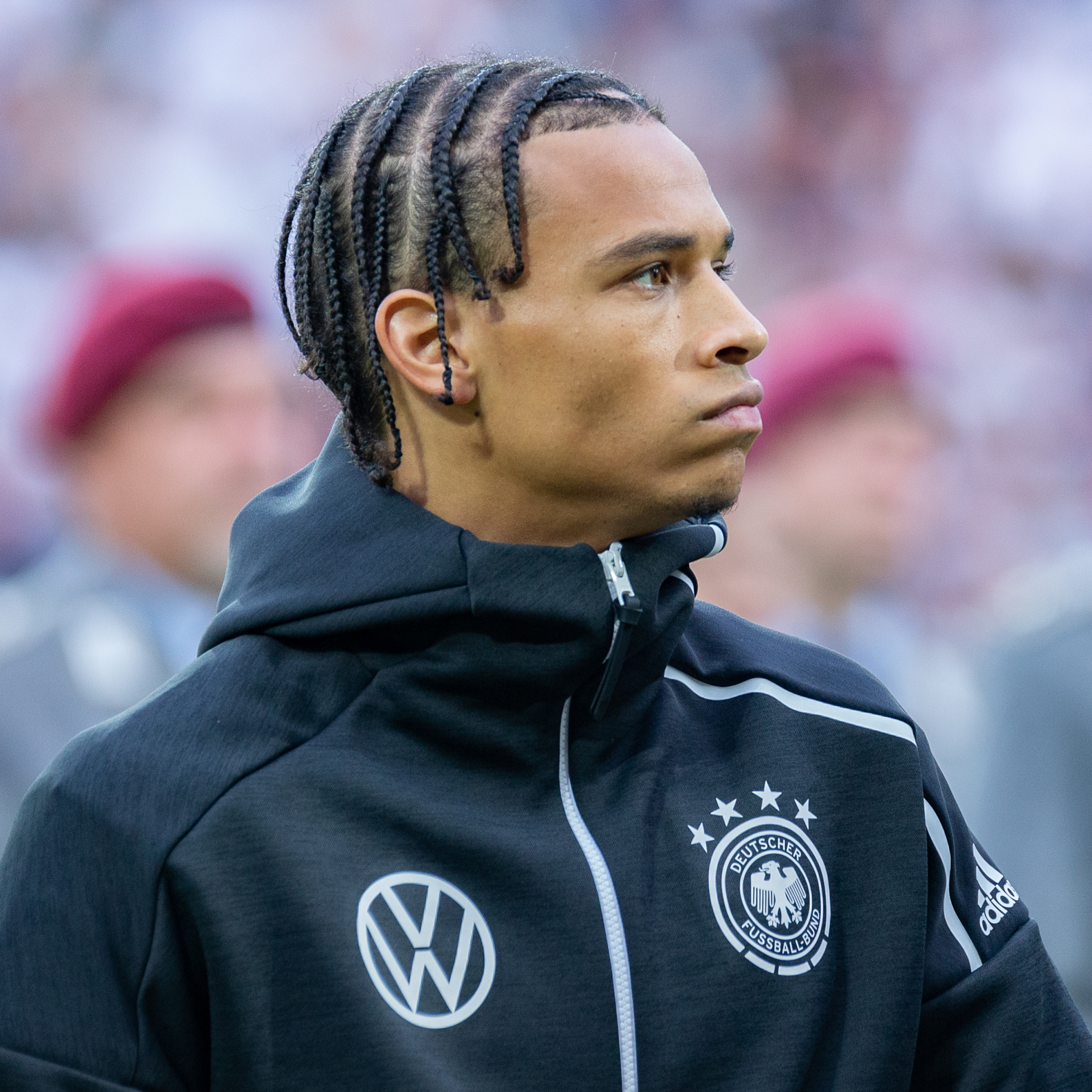
Sané with Germany in 2019

Sané received his first senior call-up to the German senior team on 6 November 2015 in a friendly against France. Sané was eligible to play for France, due to also holding French citizenship. On 13 November 2015, he was substituted in the 61st-minute for Julian Draxler in a friendly match against France in Saint-Denis in a 2–0 defeat for the Germans that was overshadowed by shootings and explosions around the stadium.

Sané was selected by Germany boss Joachim Löw to represent the country at UEFA Euro 2016. He participated in one match, replacing Bastian Schweinsteiger in the 79th minute in Germany's 2–0 semi-final defeat to France.

Sané was omitted from Germany's final 23-man squad for the 2018 FIFA World Cup in favour of another young player, Julian Brandt, on 4 June 2018. In September 2018, after he was selected for the squad to face games against France and Peru, he left the team hotel after a discussion with Joachim Löw, citing "personal reasons" as his cause for leaving. It was later revealed that the reason for leaving was due to the birth of his daughter.

On 16 November 2018, he scored his first goal for Germany against Russia following an assist from Serge Gnabry. The goal came in the eighth minute of the game as Germany won 3–0.

On 19 May 2021, he was selected to the squad for the UEFA Euro 2020. He played in all four of Germany's matches: starting once against Hungary and appearing as a substitute against France, Portugal and England.

In November 2022, he was named in the 26-man squad for the 2022 FIFA World Cup in Qatar. In June 2024, Sané was named in Germany's squad for the UEFA Euro 2024.

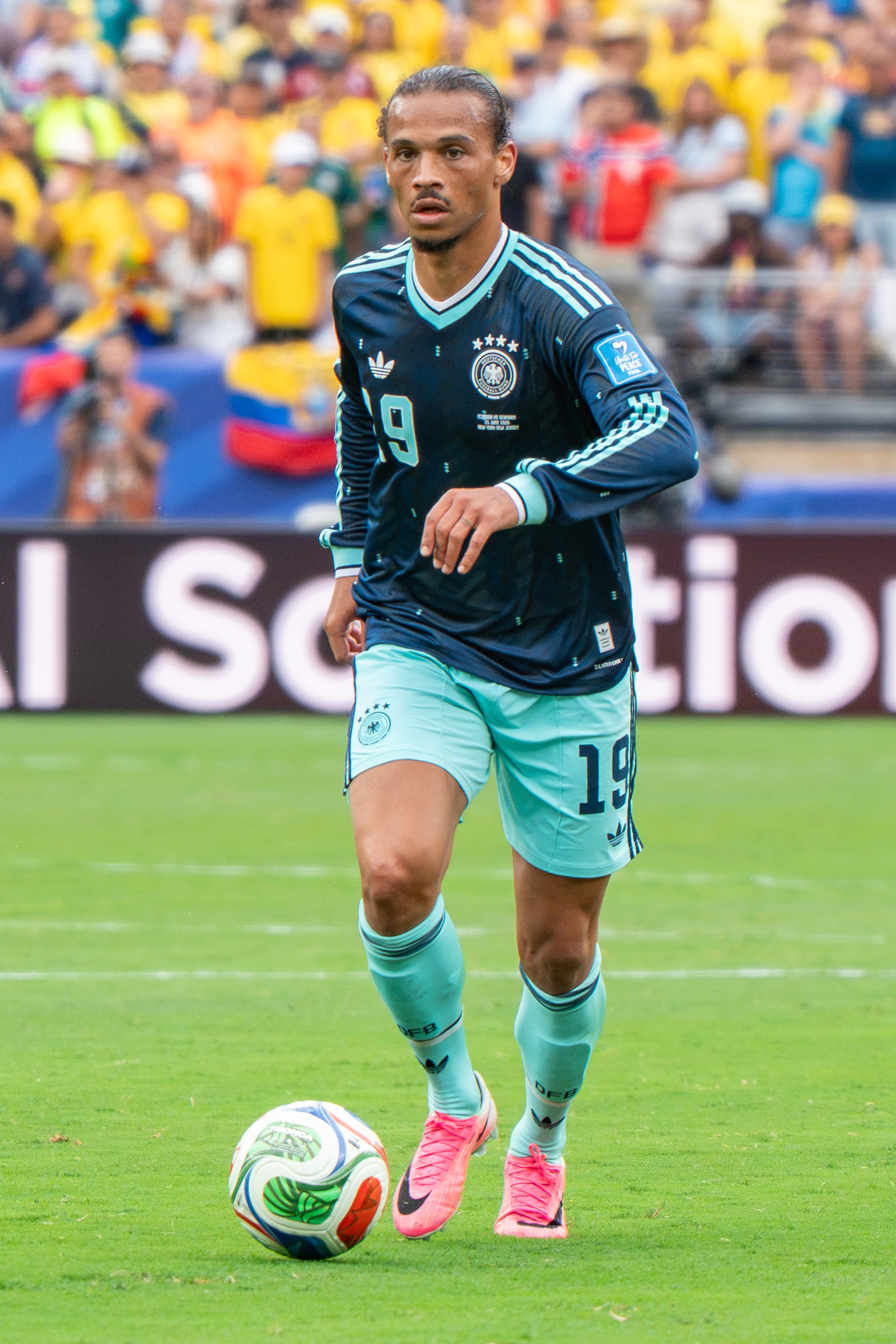
Sané with Germany during the 2026 FIFA World Cup

On 21 May 2026, he was selected in Germany's 26-man squad for the 2026 FIFA World Cup. On 25 June, he scored his first World Cup goal in a 2–1 defeat against Ecuador within the first two minutes, becoming the second-fastest World Cup goal for Germany, behind only Ernst Lehner's strike in 1934. Sané started the match against Paraguay in the Round of 32, where he played 87 minutes before being substituted, registering no successful dribbles from seven attempts, no accurate crosses from eight attempts, and winning only one of nine duels, in a match ended in a penalty shoot-out defeat and Germany's elimination from the World Cup.

== Career statistics ==
=== Club ===
As of match played 9 November 2026

Appearances and goals by club, season and competition
Club	Season	League			National cup (Note: Includes DFB-Pokal, FA Cup, Turkish Cup)		League cup (Note: Includes EFL Cup)		Europe (Note: All appearances in UEFA Champions League, unless otherwise noted)		Other		Total	
Club	Season	Division	Apps	Goals	Apps	Goals	Apps	Goals	Apps	Goals	Apps	Goals	Apps	Goals
Schalke 04	2013–14	Bundesliga	1	0	0	0	—		0	0	—		1	0
Schalke 04	2014–15	Bundesliga	13	3	0	0	—		1	1	—		14	4
Schalke 04	2015–16	Bundesliga	33	8	2	0	—		7 (Note: Appearances in UEFA Europa League)	1	—		42	9
Schalke 04	Total		47	11	2	0	—		8	2	—		57	13
Manchester City	2016–17	Premier League	26	5	5	2	2	0	4	2	—		37	9
Manchester City	2017–18	Premier League	32	10	3	1	5	3	9	0	—		49	14
Manchester City	2018–19	Premier League	31	10	4	2	3	0	8	4	1 (Note: Appearance in FA Community Shield)	0	47	16
Manchester City	2019–20	Premier League	1	0	0	0	0	0	0	0	1	0	2	0
Manchester City	Total		90	25	12	5	10	3	21	6	2	0	135	39
Bayern Munich	2020–21	Bundesliga	32	6	1	1	—		8	3	3 (Note: One appearance in UEFA Super Cup, two appearances in FIFA Club World Cup)	0	44	10
Bayern Munich	2021–22	Bundesliga	32	7	2	1	—		10	6	1 (Note: Appearance in DFL-Supercup)	0	45	14
Bayern Munich	2022–23	Bundesliga	32	8	3	1	—		8	4	1	1	44	14
Bayern Munich	2023–24	Bundesliga	27	8	1	0	—		12	2	1	0	42	10
Bayern Munich	2024–25	Bundesliga	30	11	2	1	—		13	1	3 (Note: Appearances in FIFA Club World Cup)	0	48	13
Bayern Munich	Total		153	40	10	4	—		51	16	9	1	223	61
Galatasaray	2025–26	Süper Lig	28	7	3	0	—		10	0	2 (Note: Appearances in Turkish Super Cup)	0	43	7
Galatasaray	2026–27	Süper Lig	11	0	2	0	—		0	0	0 (Note: Appearances in Turkish Super Cup)	0	13	0
Galatasaray	Total		39	7	5	0	—		10	0	2	0	56	7
Career total			329	83	30	9	10	3	90	24	13	1	471	120

=== International ===
As of match played 29 June 2026

Appearances and goals by national team and year
National team	Year	Apps	Goals
Germany	2015	1	0
Germany	2016	3	0
Germany	2017	5	0
Germany	2018	8	2
Germany	2019	4	3
Germany	2020	4	1
Germany	2021	15	5
Germany	2022	10	0
Germany	2023	9	2
Germany	2024	8	1
Germany	2025	5	2
Germany	2026	8	2
Total		80	18

As of match played 25 June 2026
Germany score listed first, score column indicates score after each Sané goal.

List of international goals scored by Leroy Sané
No.	Date	Venue	Cap	Opponent	Score	Result	Competition
1	15 November 2018	Red Bull Arena, Leipzig, Germany	16	Russia	1–0	3–0	Friendly
2	19 November 2018	Arena AufSchalke, Gelsenkirchen, Germany	17	Netherlands	2–0	2–2	2018–19 UEFA Nations League A
3	24 March 2019	Johan Cruyff Arena, Amsterdam, Netherlands	19	Netherlands	1–0	3–2	UEFA Euro 2020 qualifying
4	8 June 2019	Borisov Arena, Barysaw, Belarus	20	Belarus	1–0	2–0	UEFA Euro 2020 qualifying
5	11 June 2019	Opel Arena, Mainz, Germany	21	Estonia	8–0	8–0	UEFA Euro 2020 qualifying
6	14 November 2020	Red Bull Arena, Leipzig, Germany	24	Ukraine	1–1	3–1	2020–21 UEFA Nations League A
7	7 June 2021	Merkur Spiel-Arena, Düsseldorf, Germany	30	Latvia	7–1	7–1	Friendly
8	2 September 2021	Kybunpark, St. Gallen, Switzerland	35	Liechtenstein	2–0	2–0	2022 FIFA World Cup qualification
9	8 September 2021	Laugardalsvöllur, Reykjavík, Iceland	37	Iceland	3–0	4–0	2022 FIFA World Cup qualification
10	11 November 2021	Volkswagen Arena, Wolfsburg, Germany	39	Liechtenstein	3–0	9–0	2022 FIFA World Cup qualification
11	11 November 2021	Volkswagen Arena, Wolfsburg, Germany	39	Liechtenstein	5–0	9–0	2022 FIFA World Cup qualification
12	9 September 2023	Volkswagen Arena, Wolfsburg, Germany	54	Japan	1–1	1–4	Friendly
13	12 September 2023	Westfalenstadion, Dortmund, Germany	55	France	2–0	2–1	Friendly
14	16 November 2024	Europa-Park Stadion, Freiburg, Germany	66	Bosnia and Herzegovina	6–0	7–0	2024–25 UEFA Nations League A
15	17 November 2025	Red Bull Arena, Leipzig, Germany	72	Slovakia	3–0	6–0	2026 FIFA World Cup qualification
16	17 November 2025	Red Bull Arena, Leipzig, Germany	72	Slovakia	4–0	6–0	2026 FIFA World Cup qualification
17	6 June 2026	Soldier Field, Chicago, United States	76	United States	2–1	2–1	Friendly
18	25 June 2026	MetLife Stadium, East Rutherford, United States	79	Ecuador	1–0	1–2	2026 FIFA World Cup

== Honours ==
Manchester City

- Premier League: 2017–18, 2018–19
- FA Cup: 2018–19
- EFL Cup: 2017–18, 2018–19, 2019–20
- FA Community Shield: 2018, 2019

Bayern Munich

- Bundesliga: 2020–21, 2021–22, 2022–23, 2024–25
- DFL-Supercup: 2021, 2022
- UEFA Super Cup: 2020
- FIFA Club World Cup: 2020

Galatasaray

- Süper Lig: 2025–26

Germany

- FIFA Confederations Cup: 2017

Individual

- PFA Young Player of the Year: 2017–18
- Premier League Player of the Month: October 2017
- VDV Newcomer of the Season: 2014–15
- UEFA Champions League Fantasy Football Team of the Season: 2021–22
