= Souleymane Sané =

Senegalese footballer (born 1961)

Souleymane Sane
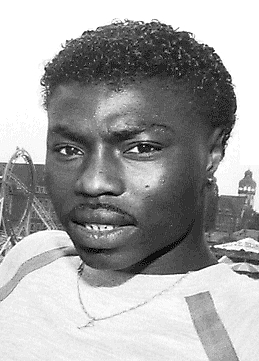

Personal information
- Full name: Souleymane Jean Sané
- Date of birth: 26 February 1961 (age 65)
- Place of birth: Dakar, Senegal
- Height: 1.74 m (5 ft 9 in)
- Position: Striker

Youth career
- Vitry-Sur-Seine
- 1981–1982: ES Viry-Châtillon
- 1982–1985: FV Donaueschingen
- 1983–1984: → Blagnac FC (loan)

Senior career*
Years	Team	Apps	(Gls)
1985–1988	SC Freiburg	106	(56)
1988–1990	1. FC Nürnberg	57	(12)
1990–1994	SG Wattenscheid 09	117	(39)
1994–1995	FC Tirol Innsbruck	48	(23)
1995–1997	Lausanne-Sport	57	(27)
1997–1999	SG Wattenscheid 09	45	(9)
1999	LASK	10	(0)
2000	FC Schaffhausen		
2000–2004	Rot-Weiß Leithe		
2004–2009	Schwarz-Weiß Südfeldmark		
2009–2010	DJK Wattenscheid		

International career
1990–1997	Senegal	23	(11)

Managerial career
- 2008–2011: Zanzibar (coach)
- 2009–2010: DJK Wattenscheid (player-coach)
- * Club domestic league appearances and goals

Souleymane Jean Sané (born 26 February 1961) is a Senegalese former professional footballer who played as a striker. He is the father of Germany forward Leroy Sané.

== Playing career ==
Sané was born to Senegalese diplomats, and moved to France at the age of four. He chose to be a footballer, much to the chagrin of his father, and played football at amateur level. In 1982, he was called up for military service, and according to the law he could be based close to his home as a promising sportsman. For this to happen, the FFF had to send over the necessary papers, but due to Sané being on his summer holiday at the time, he was unable to contact his parents. The application was missed, and Sané was ordered to serve in Germany.

Whilst in Germany he played football part-time for FV Donaueschingen, where he was scouted by 2. Bundesliga side SC Freiburg. He signed his first professional contract in 1985. During three years at the club, he scored 56 goals and was top scorer in 1988. He then spent two seasons at 1. FC Nürnberg, and in 1990, signed for SG Wattenscheid 09, then a Bundesliga club. He was noted for his speed, being able run 100 metres in 10.7 seconds, and for being one of the first African players to play in the Bundesliga.

In 1994, he joined FC Tirol Innsbruck, finishing as the Austrian Bundesliga's top scorer at the end of the season. He then returned to Wattenscheid for two seasons. Sané played in Austria for Linz and also in Switzerland representing Schaffhausen in the latter part of the nineties. He would return to the Ruhr valley, where his family were situated, and played for different amateur clubs in the region.

In all, he scored 51 goals in 174 (West) German top-flight appearances.

== Coaching career ==
Sané worked as a coach for the Zanzibar national team from 2008 to 2011, and as a player-coach for DJK Wattenscheid during the 2009–10 season.

== Personal life ==
Sané is married to Regina Weber, and has three sons, all of which were in Schalke 04's youth academy. His sons Leroy Sané and Sidi Sané are professional footballers. He holds French citizenship.

== Honours ==
Individual

- 2. Bundesliga top scorer: 1987–88 (21 goals)
- Austrian Football Bundesliga top scorer: 1994–95 (20 goals)
