= Rayan Philippe =

French footballer (born 2000)

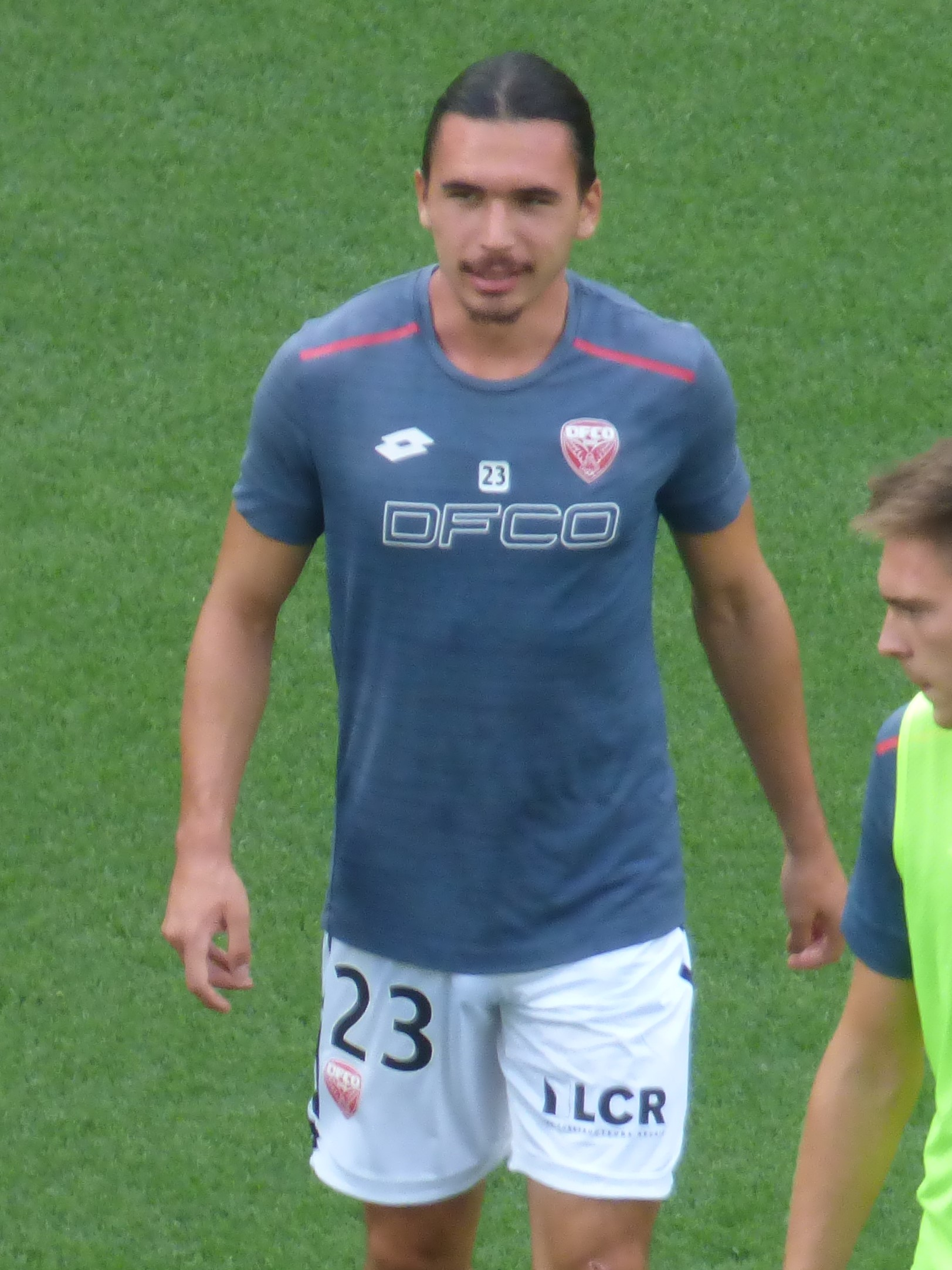
- Philippe with Dijon in 2020

Personal information
- Date of birth: 23 October 2000 (age 26)
- Place of birth: Nice, France
- Height: 1.82 m (6 ft 0 in)
- Position: Forward

Team information
- Current team: SC Paderborn (on loan from Hamburger SV)
- Number: 9

Youth career
- 2007–2011: Rapid Menton
- 2011–2013: Roquebrune-Cap-Martin
- 2013: Cavigal
- 2013–2015: Roquebrune-Cap-Martin
- 2015–2018: Dijon

Senior career*
Years	Team	Apps	(Gls)
2018–2021	Dijon II	34	(10)
2019–2021	Dijon	5	(0)
2020	→ Toulon (loan)	5	(1)
2020–2021	→ Nancy (loan)	15	(0)
2021–2023	Swift Hesperange	45	(39)
2023–2025	Eintracht Braunschweig	59	(21)
2025–	Hamburger SV	29	(5)
2026–	→ SC Paderborn (loan)	7	(1)

International career^{‡}
2019	France U20	2	(0)
- * Club domestic league appearances and goals as of 31 October 2026 ‡ National team caps and goals as of 8 September 2019

Rayan Philippe (born 23 October 2000) is a French professional footballer who plays as a forward for Bundesliga club SC Paderborn, on loan from Hamburger SV.

== Career ==
Philippe made his professional debut with Dijon in a 2–0 Ligue 1 loss to Bordeaux on 24 August 2019.

On 29 August 2021, he joined Swift Hesperange in Luxembourg.

In June 2023, Philippe signed for 2. Bundesliga club Eintracht Braunschweig on a two-year deal following a season in which he scored 32 goals and registered 26 assists in just 30 matches.

On 2 July 2025, Philippe moved to Hamburger SV in Bundesliga. On 1 September 2026, he was loaned to SC Paderborn in the same league for the 2026–27 season.

== Career statistics ==
As of match played 31 October 2026

Appearances and goals by club, season and competition
Club	Season	League			National cup		Europe		Other		Total	
Club	Season	Division	Apps	Goals	Apps	Goals	Apps	Goals	Apps	Goals	Apps	Goals
Dijon II	2018–19	Championnat National 2	15	1	—		—		—		15	1
Dijon II	2019–20	Championnat National 2	12	8	—		—		—		12	8
Dijon II	2020–21	Championnat National 2	1	0	—		—		—		1	0
Dijon II	Total		28	9	—		—		—		28	9
Dijon	2019–20	Ligue 1	1	0	0	0	—		—		1	0
Dijon	2020–21	Ligue 1	4	0	0	0	—		—		4	0
Dijon	Total		5	0	0	0	—		—		5	0
SC Toulon (loan)	2019–20	Ligue 3	5	1	—		—		—		5	1
Nancy (loan)	2020–21	Ligue 2	15	0	1	0	—		—		16	0
Swift Hesperange	2021–22	BGL Ligue	15	7	1	0	—		—		16	7
Swift Hesperange	2022–23	BGL Ligue	30	32	2	1	—		—		32	33
Swift Hesperange	Total		45	39	3	1	—		—		48	40
Eintracht Braunschweig	2023–24	2. Bundesliga	25	8	1	0	—		—		26	8
Eintracht Braunschweig	2024–25	2. Bundesliga	34	13	1	0	—		2 (Note: Appearances in 2. Bundesliga relegation play-offs)	1	37	14
Eintracht Braunschweig	Total		59	21	2	0	—		2	1	63	22
Hamburger SV	2025–26	Bundesliga	29	5	3	0	—		—		32	5
Hamburger SV	2026–27	Bundesliga	1	0	1	0	—		—		2	0
Hamburger SV	Total		30	5	4	0	—		—		34	5
SC Paderborn (loan)	2026–27	Bundesliga	7	1	0	0	—		—		7	1
Career total			191	75	9	1	0	0	2	1	202	76
