= Munier Raychouni =

German footballer and coach (born 1986)

- Raychouni in 2014

Personal information
- Full name: Munier Mohammed Yassine Raychouni
- Date of birth: 29 December 1986 (age 39)
- Place of birth: Berlin, Germany
- Height: 1.82 m (6 ft 0 in)
- Positions: Defender; midfielder

Team information
- Current team: SSV Jahn Regensburg (assistant coach)

Youth career
- SC Berliner Amateure
- 1. FC Wilmersdorf
- Tennis Borussia Berlin

Senior career*
| Years | Team | Apps | (Gls) |
| 2005–2006 | Torgelower SV Greif | | |
| 2007–2009 | BFC Preussen | | |
| 2010 | Club Italia-AdW | | |
| 2010 | SV Altlüdersdorf | | |
| 2011 | Woodlands Wellington | 31 | (0) |
| 2012–2014 | Safa | 8 | (0) |
| 2014–2015 | Isa Town | | |
| 2016 | Lamphun Warrior | | |
| 2016–2018 | CFC Hertha 06 | 12 | (0) |

Managerial career
- 2017–2018: CFC Hertha 06
- 2018–2020: Berliner AK 07
- 2025: SSV Jahn Regensburg (caretaker)
- 2026: SSV Jahn Regensburg (caretaker)
- * Club domestic league appearances and goals

Munier Mohammed Yassine Raychouni (born 29 December 1986) is a German professional football coach and former player who is the assistant coach of 3. Liga club SSV Jahn Regensburg.

Raychouni played as a defender or midfielder in Germany, Singapore, Lebanon, Bahrain, and Thailand.

== Early life ==
Raychouni was born in Germany to a Lebanese father and German mother.

== Playing career ==
=== Early career ===
Raychouni played youth football for SC Berliner Amateure, 1. FC Wilmersdorf, and Tennis Borussia Berlin.

=== Singapore ===
Flying to Singapore to trial for Woodlands Wellington of the local S.League in January 2011, due to Canadian player Sergio De Luca contacting them, Raychouni eventually signed a one-year contract with the club. He recorded his first appearance in a 1–0 defeat to Hougang United, playing the full 90 minutes. Provided with a remuneration and an apartment by Woodlands Wellington, the Lebanese footballer operated mostly as a centre-back throughout his stay there, sometimes selected as captain and ending the season with 31 appearances.

=== Lebanon ===
For the 2012–13 season, Raychouni was under contract with Lebanese Premier League club Safa, also participating in the 2013 AFC Cup.

=== Thailand and India trials ===
In July 2013, Thai Premier League side Pattaya United contacted Raychouni to negotiate a possible transfer. However, the move never occurred. The next year, he tried out for Salgaocar, then of the Indian I-League, and did not make the team.

=== Bahrain ===
Under contract with Bahraini Second Division club Isa Town for the 2014–15 season, the defender was satisfied with the experience of playing professionally abroad but expressed desire to go back to Germany.

=== Return to Germany ===
Between 2017 and 2018, Raychouni simultaneously served as head coach and played for CFC Hertha 06 of the German fifth division.

== Managerial career ==
After an experience as player-manager of CFC Hertha 06, in 2018 Raychouni became manager of Berliner AK 07. He went on to be the interim manager of SSV Jahn Regensburg in May 2025. In March 2026 he again served as the interim manager of Regensburg.
