= Fiege Logistik =

German family-owned contract logistics company

- Native name: FIEGE Logistik Stiftung & Co. KG
- Company type: private
- Industry: Contract logistics
- Founded: 1873; 152 years ago
- Founder: Joan Joseph Fiege
- Headquarters: Greven, North Rhine-Westphalia, Germany
- Area served: Europe and Asia
- Key people: Jens Fiege (Co-CEO); Felix Fiege (Co-CEO)
- Products: Warehousing, e-commerce fulfillment, transport, customs, value-added logistics, real estate
- Revenue: €2 billion (2024)
- Number of employees: ~23,000 (2024)
- Website: www.fiege.com/en

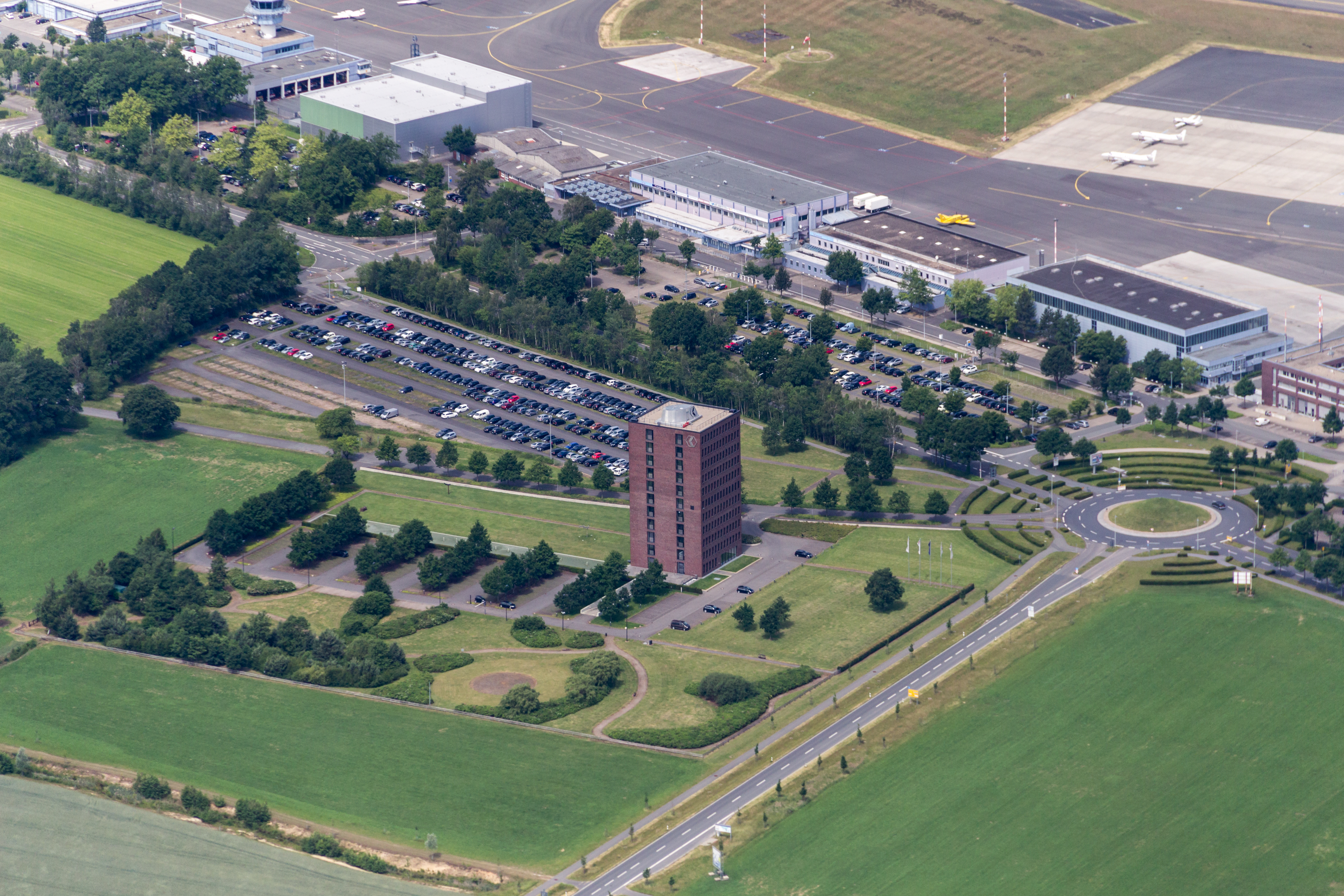
Company headquarters at Münster Osnabrück Airport in Greven

Fiege Logistik (stylised FIEGE) is a German, family-owned contract logistics company headquartered in Greven, North Rhine-Westphalia. Founded in 1873 as a local haulage business, the group develops and operates warehousing and fulfillment solutions for sectors including fashion, consumer, healthcare and industry, and offers related digital services, transport and customs brokerage across Europe and parts of Asia. In 2024 the group reported roughly €2 billion in revenue and a workforce of about 23,000 across more than 130 locations.

== History ==
The company traces its origins to 1873, when farmer Joan Joseph Fiege began a small haulage enterprise in Greven using a horse-drawn cart. Over five generations, Fiege expanded from regional transport into contract logistics, and consolidated its activities under the Fiege brand in the early 2000s as international operations grew.

In December 2020 the group divested its international freight forwarding division, Fiege Forwarding, to U.S.-based AIT Worldwide Logistics, refocusing on contract logistics and fulfillment. In April 2022 Fiege acquired World Fashion Logistics (Shanghai) to expand e-commerce and fashion logistics capabilities in Asia.

== Operations ==
Fiege designs and operates multi-client and dedicated distribution centres, with offerings spanning inbound handling, storage, order picking and packing, value-added services, returns processing and multi-carrier shipping for direct-to-consumer and business-to-business channels. Sector practices include fashion and lifestyle, consumer products, healthcare and industry.

The company is a long-standing logistics partner to Zalando, operating fulfillment sites that serve multiple European markets. In 2019 Zalando and Fiege announced that Fiege would take over operations at Brieselang (Germany), and in 2020 they opened a 130,000 m² centre near Verona for Southern Europe.

Beyond operations, the group runs real-estate development for logistics properties and invests in logistics technology via corporate ventures and digital services units.

== COVID-19 pandemic ==
During the COVID-19 pandemic Fiege was contracted by Germany’s Federal Ministry of Health to receive, store and distribute personal protective equipment nationwide to state agencies and medical bodies.

== Organization and ownership ==
Fiege is organised as FIEGE Logistik Stiftung & Co. KG, with the general partner being Fiege Logistik Stiftung; the registered head office is in Greven, Germany. The company is jointly led by fifth-generation family members Jens and Felix Fiege as Co-CEOs.
