= 2018–19 Hamburger SV season =

Hamburger SV
2018–19 season
- President: Jens Meier
- Manager: Christian Titz (until 23 October); Hannes Wolf (from 23 October)
- Stadium: Volksparkstadion
- 2. Bundesliga: 4th
- DFB-Pokal: Semifinals
- Top goalscorer: League: Pierre-Michel Lasogga (13); All: Pierre-Michel Lasogga (16)
Home colours	Away colours	Third colours
- All statistics correct as of 5 August 2018.

The 2018–19 Hamburger SV season was the 100th season in the football club's history and their first season in the 2. Bundesliga, where they were relegated from the Bundesliga the previous season after spending 55 seasons in the league. In addition to the domestic league, Hamburger SV also participated in this season's edition of the domestic cup, the DFB-Pokal. This was the 66th season for Hamburg in the Volksparkstadion, located in Hamburg, Germany. The season covers a period from 1 July 2018 to 30 June 2019.

== Players ==
As of 26 July 2018

No.	Name	Nationality	Position	Date of birth (age)	Joined	Previous club	Apps	Goals
Goalkeepers
1	Julian Pollersbeck	(Germany)	GK	16 August 1994 (age 32)	2017	(Germany) Kaiserslautern	10	0
30	Morten Behrens	(Germany)	GK	1 April 1997 (age 29)	2018	(Germany) Hamburger SV II	0	0
36	Tom Mickel	(Germany)	GK	19 April 1989 (age 37)	2016	(Germany) Greuther Fürth	2	0
Defenders
4	Rick van Drongelen	(Netherlands)	DF	20 December 1998 (age 27)	2017	(Netherlands) Sparta Rotterdam	18	0
5	David Bates	(Scotland)	DF	5 October 1996 (age 30)	2018	(Scotland) Rangers	0	0
6	Douglas Santos	(Brazil)	DF	22 March 1994 (age 32)	2016	(Brazil) Atlético Mineiro	23	0
9	Kyriakos Papadopoulos	(Greece)	DF	23 February 1992 (age 34)	2017	(Germany) Bayer Leverkusen	44	3
22	Stephan Ambrosius	(Ghana)	DF	18 December 1998 (age 27)	2017	(Germany) Hamburger SV II	1	0
24	Gōtoku Sakai	(Japan)	DF	14 March 1991 (age 35)	2015	(Germany) Stuttgart	83	1
26	Tobias Knost	(Germany)	DF	8 May 2000 (age 26)	2018	(Germany) Hamburger SV Academy	0	0
27	Josha Vagnoman	(Germany)	DF	11 December 2000 (age 25)	2018	(Germany) Hamburger SV Academy	1	0
28	Gideon Jung	(Germany)	CB	12 September 1994 (age 32)	2014	(Germany) Hamburger SV II	59	1
36	Patric Pfeiffer	(Germany)	CB	20 August 1999 (age 27)	2018	(Germany) Hamburger SV II	0	0
38	Jonas Behounek	(Germany)	CB	7 May 1998 (age 28)	2018	(Germany) Hamburger SV II	0	0
Midfielders
7	Khaled Narey	(Togo)	RM	22 March 1994 (age 32)	2018	(Germany) Greuther Fürth	0	0
8	Lewis Holtby	(Germany)	AM	19 September 1990 (age 36)	2015	(England) Tottenham Hotspur	79	10
13	Christoph Moritz	(Germany)	CM	27 January 1990 (age 36)	2018	(Germany) Kaiserslautern	0	0
14	Aaron Hunt	(Germany)	AM	4 September 1986 (age 40)	2015	(Germany) Wolfsburg	72	8
16	Vasilije Janjičić	(Switzerland)	DM	2 November 1998 (age 27)	2016	(Switzerland) Zürich	10	0
17	Filip Kostić	(Serbia)	LW	1 November 1992 (age 33)	2016	(Germany) Stuttgart	61	9
18	Bakery Jatta	(The Gambia)	RW	6 June 1998 (age 28)	2016	(Germany) Hamburger SV II	12	0
20	Albin Ekdal	(Sweden)	CM	28 July 1989 (age 37)	2015	(Italy) Cagliari	54	1
21	Moritz Kwarteng	(Germany)	AM	28 April 1998 (age 28)	2017	(Germany) TSG 1899 Hoffenheim	0	0
25	Mats Köhlert	(Germany)	LW	2 May 1998 (age 28)	2016	(Germany) Hamburger SV II	0	0
29	Ville Matti Steinmann	(Finland)	DM	8 January 1995 (age 31)	2018	(Germany) Hamburger SV II	0	0
31	Arianit Ferati	(Germany)	AM	7 September 1997 (age 29)	2016	(Germany) Hamburger SV II	0	0
32	Aaron Opoku	(Germany)	LM	28 March 1999 (age 27)	2018	(Germany) Hamburger SV II	0	0
33	Marco Drawz	(Poland)	RM	30 January 1999 (age 27)	2018	(Germany) Hamburger SV II	0	0
34	Jonas David	(Germany)	MF	8 March 2000 (age 26)	2018	(Germany) Hamburger SV II	0	0
51	Finn Porath	(Germany)	MF	23 February 1997 (age 29)	2015	(Germany) Hamburger SV II	1	0
Forwards
10	Pierre-Michel Lasogga	(Germany)	SS	15 December 1991 (age 34)	2014	(Germany) Hertha BSC	96	26
11	Tatsuya Ito	(Japan)	ST	26 June 1997 (age 29)	2017	(Germany) Hamburger SV II	20	0
15	Jann-Fiete Arp	(Germany)	ST	6 January 2000 (age 26)	2017	(Germany) Hamburger SV II	18	2
19	Manuel Wintzheimer	(Germany)	ST	10 January 1999 (age 27)	2018	(Germany) FC Bayern Munich II	0	0
23	Jairo	(Spain)	ST	11 July 1993 (age 33)	2018	(Spain) Las Palmas	0	0
52	Batuhan Altıntaş	(Turkey)	ST	14 March 1996 (age 30)	2015	(Turkey) Bursaspor	1	0

== Transfers ==
=== In ===
No.	Pos	Player	Age	From	Type	Window	Ends	Fee	Source
5	DF	(Scotland) David Bates	21	(Scotland) Rangers	Transfer	Summer	2022	Free	
7	MF	(Togo) Khaled Narey	24	(Germany) Greuther Fürth	Transfer	Summer	2022	€1.5M	
10	FW	(Germany) Pierre-Michel Lasogga	26	(England) Leeds United	Loan return	Summer	2019	—N/a	
13	MF	(Germany) Christoph Moritz	28	(Germany) Kaiserslautern	Transfer	Summer	2020	Free	
19	FW	(Germany) Manuel Wintzheimer	19	(Germany) Bayern Munich II	Transfer	Summer	2022	Free	
21	MF	(Germany) Moritz Kwarteng	20	(Germany) Hamburger SV II	Transfer	Summer	2021	Youth system	
22	DF	(Germany) Stephan Ambrosius	19	(Germany) Hamburger SV II	Transfer	Summer	2021	Youth system	
23	FW	(Spain) Jairo Samperio	24	(Spain) Las Palmas	Transfer	Summer	2019		
26	MF	(Germany) Tobias Knost	18	(Germany) Hamburger SV II	Transfer	Summer	2020	Youth system	
27	DF	(Germany) Josha Vagnoman	17	(Germany) Hamburger SV II	Transfer	Summer	2021	Youth system	
29	MF	(Finland) Ville Matti Steinmann	23	(Germany) Hamburger SV II	Transfer	Summer	2020	Youth system	
30	GK	(Germany) Morten Behrens	21	(Germany) Hamburger SV II	Transfer	Summer	2020	Youth system	
31	MF	(Kosovo) Arianit Ferati	20	(Germany) Hamburger SV II	Transfer	Summer	2020	Youth system	
32	MF	(Ghana) Aaron Opoku	19	(Germany) Hamburger SV II	Transfer	Summer	2021	Youth system	
33	MF	(Poland) Marco Drawz	19	(Germany) Hamburger SV II	Transfer	Summer	2019	Youth system	
34	MF	(Germany) Jonas David	18	(Germany) Hamburger SV II	Transfer	Summer	2019	Youth system	
36	DF	(Germany) Patric Pfeiffer	18	(Germany) Hamburger SV II	Transfer	Summer	2021	Youth system	
52	FW	(Turkey) Batuhan Altıntaş	22	(Turkey) Giresunspor	Loan return	Summer	2019	—N/a	

=== Out ===
No.	Pos	Player	Age	To	Type	Window	Ends	Fee	Source
1	GK	(Germany) Christian Mathenia	26	(Germany) Nürnberg	Transfer	Summer	2019	€0.5M	
2	DF	(Germany) Dennis Diekmeier	28		Released	Summer			
5	DF	(Albania) Mërgim Mavraj	32	Retired	Transfer	Summer		Retired	
7	FW	(United States) Bobby Wood	25	(Germany) Hannover 96	Loan	Summer	2019	€1.2M	
12	MF	(Brazil) Walace	23	(Germany) Hannover 96	Transfer	Summer	2021	€6.0M	
11	FW	(Germany) André Hahn	27	(Germany) Augsburg	Transfer	Summer	2022	€3.0M	
15	FW	(Germany) Luca Waldschmidt	22	(Germany) Freiburg	Transfer	Summer	2020	€5.0M	
19	FW	(Germany) Sven Schipplock	29	(Germany) Arminia Bielefeld	Transfer	Summer	2021	Free	
22	DF	(Germany) Bjarne Thoelke	26	(Austria) Admira Wacker	Transfer	Summer	2019	Free	
23	MF	(Croatia) Alen Halilović	22	(Italy) Milan	Transfer	Summer	2021	Free	
23	MF	(Bosnia and Herzegovina) Sejad Salihović	33	Retired	Transfer	Summer		Retired	
27	MF	(Germany) Nicolai Müller	30	(Germany) Eintracht Frankfurt	Transfer	Summer	2020	Free	
30	GK	(Switzerland) Andreas Hirzel	25	(Liechtenstein) Vaduz (Note: Vaduz is a Liechtensteiner club that plays in the Swiss football league system.)	Transfer	Summer	2020	Free	

Income: ▲€15.7M

== Non-competitive ==
=== Preseason exhibitions ===
11 July 2018	Hamburger SV	1–0	CSKA Moscow	Draßburg, Austria
11:45	Holtby 72' (pen.)	Report	Nababkin (yellow card) 28'	Stadium: Sportplatz Draßburg

14 July 2018	Rapid Wien	1–2	Hamburger SV	Vienna, Austria
13:00	Malicsek 47'	Report	Steinmann 42'; Ito 58'	Stadium: Allianz Stadion; Attendance: 10,700

21 July 2018	Hamburger SV	2–1	Stoke City	Meppen
10:00	Hunt 36'; Arp 40' (pen.)	Report	Pieters 15'	Stadium: Hänsch-Arena

28 July 2018	Hamburger SV	3–1	Monaco (Note: Monaco is a Monégasque club that plays in the French football league system.)	Hamburg
10:00	Narey 30', 43'; Lasogga 73'	Report	Lopes 47'	Stadium: Volksparkstadion

=== Mid-season exhibitions ===
15 August 2018	Hamburger SV	1–4	Bayern Munich	Hamburg
12:00		Report		Stadium: Volksparkstadion

== Competitive ==
=== 2. Bundesliga ===
==== League table ====
Pos	Team	Pld	W	D	L	GF	GA	GD	Pts	Promotion, qualification or relegation
2	SC Paderborn (P)	34	16	9	9	76	50	+26	57	Promotion to Bundesliga
3	Union Berlin (O, P)	34	14	15	5	54	33	+21	57	Qualification for promotion play-offs
4	Hamburger SV	34	16	8	10	45	42	+3	56	
5	1. FC Heidenheim	34	15	10	9	55	45	+10	55	
6	Holstein Kiel	34	13	10	11	60	51	+9	49	

Source: DFB
Rules for classification: 1) Points; 2) Goal difference; 3) Goals scored; 4) Head-to-head points; 5) Head-to-head goal difference; 6) Head-to-head goals scored; 7) Head-to-head away goals scored; 8) Away goals scored; 9) Play-off.
(O) Play-off winners; (P) Promoted

==== Results summary ====
Overall								Home						Away					
Pld	W	D	L	GF	GA	GD	Pts	W	D	L	GF	GA	GD	W	D	L	GF	GA	GD
34	16	8	10	45	42	+3	56	8	4	5	21	22	−1	8	4	5	24	20	+4

Source: bundesliga.de

==== Match reports ====
3 August 2018 1	Hamburger SV	0–3	Holstein Kiel	Hamburg
20:30 CEST (UTC+2)		Report	Meffert 56'; Kinsombi 78'; Honsak 90+3'	Stadium: Volksparkstadion; Attendance: 57,000; Referee: Marco Fritz

12 August 2018 2	SV Sandhausen	0–3	Hamburger SV	Sandhausen
13:30 CEST (UTC+2)		Report	Narey 7', 59'; van Drongelen 30'	Stadium: BWT-Stadion am Hardtwald; Attendance: 14,508; Referee: Tobias Welz

27 August 2018 3	Hamburger SV	3–0	Arminia Bielefeld	Hamburg
20:30 CEST (UTC+2)	Holtby 9'; Lasogga 75', 88' (pen.)	Report		Stadium: Volksparkstadion; Attendance: 46,934; Referee: Aarne Aarnink

15 September 2018 5	Hamburger SV	3–2	1. FC Heidenheim	Hamburg
13:00 CEST (UTC+2)	Lasogga 74', 81', 83'	Report	Schmidt 64'; Glatzel 89'	Stadium: Volksparkstadion; Attendance: 45,379; Referee: Harm Osmers

18 September 2018 4	Dynamo Dresden	0–1	Hamburger SV	Dresden
18:30 CEST (UTC+2)		Report	Hwang 67'	Stadium: Rudolf-Harbig-Stadion; Attendance: 30,723; Referee: Felix Zwayer

23 September 2018 6	Hamburger SV	0–5	Jahn Regensburg	Hamburg
13:30 CEST (UTC+2)		Report	Adamyan 11', 21', 35'; Correia 53'; George 75'	Stadium: Volksparkstadion; Attendance: 44,716; Referee: Manuel Gräfe

27 September 2018 7	Greuther Fürth	0–0	Hamburger SV	Fürth
20:30 CEST (UTC+2)		Report		Stadium: Sportpark Ronhof Thomas Sommer; Attendance: 14,965; Referee: Sascha Stegemann

30 September 2018 8	Hamburger SV	0–0	FC St. Pauli	Hamburg
13:30 CEST (UTC+2)		Report		Stadium: Volksparkstadion; Attendance: 57,000; Referee: Markus Schmidt

5 October 2018 9	Darmstadt 98	1–2	Hamburger SV	Darmstadt
18:30 CEST (UTC+2)	Dursun 89'	Report	Hunt 13'; Holtby 45'	Stadium: Merck-Stadion am Böllenfalltor; Attendance: 17,400; Referee: Christian Dietz

21 October 2018 10	Hamburger SV	0–0	VfL Bochum	Hamburg
13:30 CEST (UTC+2)		Report		Stadium: Volksparkstadion; Attendance: 51,953; Referee: Christof Günsch

26 October 2018 11	1. FC Magdeburg	0–1	Hamburger SV	Magdeburg
18:30 CEST (UTC+2)		Report	Narey 77'	Stadium: MDCC-Arena; Attendance: 23,132; Referee: Timo Gerach

5 November 2018 12	Hamburger SV	1–0	1. FC Köln	Hamburg
20:30 CET (UTC+1)	Lasogga 86'	Report		Stadium: Volksparkstadion; Attendance: 53,876; Referee: Christian Dingert

10 November 2018 13	Erzgebirge Aue	1–3	Hamburger SV	Aue
13:00 CET (UTC+1)	Fandrich 23'	Report	Lasogga 21'; Narey 63'; Jatta 68'	Stadium: Erzgebirgsstadion; Attendance: 16,000; Referee: Johann Pfeifer

26 November 2018 14	Hamburger SV	2–2	Union Berlin	Hamburg
20:30 CET (UTC+1)	Hunt 58'; Holtby 65'	Report	Mees 12'; Abdullahi 90'	Stadium: Volksparkstadion; Attendance: 45,584; Referee: Frank Willenborg

1 December 2018 15	FC Ingolstadt	1–2	Hamburger SV	Ingolstadt
13:00 CET (UTC+1)	Kaya 54'	Report	Hunt 28'; Hwang 51'	Stadium: Audi Sportpark; Attendance: 13,500; Referee: Tobias Reichel

7 December 2018 16	Hamburger SV	1–0	SC Paderborn	Hamburg
18:30 CET (UTC+1)	Narey 11'	Report		Stadium: Volksparkstadion; Attendance: 49,449; Referee: Benjamin Cortus

14 December 2018 17	MSV Duisburg	1–2	Hamburger SV	Duisburg
18:30 CET (UTC+1)	Nauber 14'	Report	Narey 12'; Hunt 19'	Stadium: Schauinsland-Reisen-Arena; Attendance: 26,500; Referee: Christian Dietz

23 December 2018 18	Holstein Kiel	3–1	Hamburger SV	Kiel
13:30 CET (UTC+1)	Serra 7'; Kinsombi 18', 53'	Report	Jatta 48'	Stadium: Holstein-Stadion; Attendance: 10,073; Referee: Robert Hartmann

30 January 2019 19	Hamburger SV	2–1	SV Sandhausen	Hamburg
20:30 CET (UTC+1)	Lasogga 45', 68'	Report	Wooten 65' (pen.)	Stadium: Volksparkstadion; Attendance: 36,564; Referee: Sören Storks

2 February 2019 20	Arminia Bielefeld	2–0	Hamburger SV	Bielefeld
13:00 CET (UTC+1)	Voglsammer 19'; Yabo 26'	Report		Stadium: SchücoArena; Attendance: 26,515; Referee: Daniel Siebert

11 February 2019 21	Hamburger SV	1–0	Dynamo Dresden	Hamburg
20:30 CET (UTC+1)	Holtby 84'	Report		Stadium: Volksparkstadion; Attendance: 46,924; Referee: Frank Willenborg

16 February 2019 22	1. FC Heidenheim	2–2	Hamburger SV	Heidenheim
13:00 CET (UTC+1)	Dorsch 16'; Glatzel 54'	Report	Özcan 30'; Lasogga 70'	Stadium: Voith-Arena; Attendance: 15,000; Referee: Guido Winkmann

24 February 2019 23	Jahn Regensburg	2–1	Hamburger SV	Regensburg
13:30 CET (UTC+1)	Adamyan 74'; Grüttner 81'	Report	Bates 16'	Stadium: Continental Arena; Attendance: 15,210; Referee: Felix Zwayer

4 March 2019 24	Hamburger SV	1–0	Greuther Fürth	Hamburg
20:30 CET (UTC+1)	Hunt 85'	Report		Stadium: Volksparkstadion; Attendance: 36,560; Referee: Christian Dingert

10 March 2019 25	FC St. Pauli	0–4	Hamburger SV	Hamburg
13:30 CET (UTC+1)		Report	Lasogga 32', 61'; Narey 53'; Douglas Santos 88'	Stadium: Millerntor-Stadion; Attendance: 29,226; Referee: Felix Brych

16 March 2019 26	Hamburger SV	2–3	Darmstadt 98	Hamburg
13:00 CET (UTC+1)	Jatta 5'; Lasogga 16' (pen.)	Report	Mehlem 52', 90+2'; Kempe 82'	Stadium: Volksparkstadion; Attendance: 54,668; Referee: Florian Badstübner

30 March 2019 27	VfL Bochum	0–0	Hamburger SV	Bochum
13:00 CEST (UTC+2)		Report		Stadium: Vonovia Ruhrstadion; Attendance: 26,600; Referee: Lasse Koslowski

8 April 2019 28	Hamburger SV	1–2	1. FC Magdeburg	Hamburg
20:30 CEST (UTC+2)	Jatta 31'	Report	Bülter 60'; Türpitz 90+4'	Stadium: Volksparkstadion; Attendance: 49,820; Referee: Bastian Dankert

15 April 2019 29	1. FC Köln	1–1	Hamburger SV	Cologne
20:30 CEST (UTC+2)	Drexler 26'	Report	Wintzheimer 85'	Stadium: RheinEnergieStadion; Attendance: 50,000; Referee: Robert Hartmann

20 April 2019 30	Hamburger SV	1–1	Erzgebirge Aue	Hamburg
13:00 CEST (UTC+2)	Wintzheimer 53'	Report	Zulechner 43'	Stadium: Volksparkstadion; Attendance: 52,354; Referee: Matthias Jöllenbeck

28 April 2019 31	Union Berlin	2–0	Hamburger SV	Berlin
13:30 CEST (UTC+2)	Žulj 46'; Prömel 84'	Report		Stadium: Stadion An der Alten Försterei; Attendance: 22,012; Referee: Sascha Stegemann

4 May 2019 32	Hamburger SV	0–3	FC Ingolstadt	Hamburg
13:00 CEST (UTC+2)		Report	Lezcano 8'; Pledl 68'; Gaus 72'	Stadium: Volksparkstadion; Attendance: 50,768; Referee: Markus Schmidt

12 May 2019 33	SC Paderborn	4–1	Hamburger SV	Paderborn
15:30 CEST (UTC+2)	Vasiliadis 25', 46'; Antwi-Adjei 81', 86'	Report	van Drongelen 71'	Stadium: Benteler-Arena; Attendance: 15,000; Referee: Benjamin Cortus

19 May 2019 34	Hamburger SV	3–0	MSV Duisburg	Hamburg
15:30 CEST (UTC+2)	Lacroix 15'; Wintzheimer 49'; Arp 64'	Report		Stadium: Volksparkstadion; Attendance: 51,147; Referee: René Rohde

=== DFB-Pokal ===
18 August 2018 First round	TuS Erndtebrück	3–5	Hamburger SV	Siegen (Note: The match took place at the Leimbachstadion in Siegen instead of TuS Erndtebrück's home stadium.)
18:30 CEST (UTC+2)	Yamazaki 44'; Hunold 49'; Hilchenbach 71'	Report	Holtby 7' (pen.); Arp 10'; Lasogga 65', 66'; Mangala 10'	Stadium: Leimbachstadion; Attendance: 13,588; Referee: Robert Kempter

30 October 2018 Second round	Wehen Wiesbaden	0–3	Hamburger SV	Wiesbaden
20:45 CEST (UTC+1)		Report	Lasogga 20', 51'; Douglas Santos 90+7'	Stadium: Brita-Arena; Attendance: 11,137; Referee: Matthias Jöllenbeck

5 February 2019 Round of 16	Hamburger SV	1–0	1. FC Nürnberg	Hamburg
18:30 CET (UTC+1)	Özcan 54'	Report		Stadium: Volksparkstadion; Attendance: 47,628; Referee: Harm Osmers

2 April 2019 Quarter-final	SC Paderborn	0–2	Hamburger SV	Paderborn
18:30 CEST (UTC+2)		Report	Lasogga 54', 68'	Stadium: Benteler-Arena; Attendance: 15,000; Referee: Tobias Welz

23 April 2019 Semi-final	Hamburger SV	1–3	RB Leipzig	Hamburg
20:45 CEST (UTC+2)	Jatta 24'	Report	Poulsen 12'; Janjičić 53' (o.g.); Forsberg 72'	Stadium: Volksparkstadion; Attendance: 52,365; Referee: Felix Brych

== Statistics ==
=== Appearances and goals ===
No.	Pos	Nat	Player	Total		Bundesliga		DFB-Pokal	
No.	Pos	Nat	Player	Apps	Goals	Apps	Goals	Apps	Goals
Goalkeepers
1	GK	(Germany) GER	Julian Pollersbeck	35	0	31	0	4	0
12	GK	(Germany) GER	Tom Mickel	4	0	3	0	1	0
30	GK	(Germany) GER	Morten Behrens	0	0	0	0	0	0
Defenders
2	DF	(Switzerland) SUI	Léo Lacroix	17	1	11+5	1	1	0
4	DF	(Netherlands) NED	Rick van Drongelen	39	2	34	2	5	0
5	DF	(Scotland) SCO	David Bates	28	1	22+3	1	3	0
6	DF	(Brazil) BRA	Douglas	38	2	33	1	5	1
9	DF	(Greece) GRE	Kyriakos Papadopoulos	2	0	1	0	1	0
22	DF	(Germany) GER	Stephan Ambrosius	1	0	0	0	1	0
24	DF	(Japan) JPN	Gotoku Sakai	35	0	30+1	0	4	0
26	DF	(Germany) GER	Tobias Knost	1	0	0	0	0+1	0
27	DF	(Germany) GER	Josha Vagnoman	13	0	4+7	0	1+1	0
28	DF	(Germany) GER	Gideon Jung	17	0	9+6	0	2	0
36	DF	(Germany) GER	Patric Pfeiffer	0	0	0	0	0	0
Midfielders
7	MF	(Germany) GER	Khaled Narey	37	7	28+4	7	4+1	0
8	MF	(Germany) GER	Lewis Holtby	31	5	23+3	4	4+1	1
11	MF	(Japan) JPN	Tatsuya Ito	17	0	7+7	0	1+2	0
14	MF	(Germany) GER	Aaron Hunt	24	5	19+3	5	1+1	0
16	MF	(Switzerland) SUI	Vasilije Janjičić	27	0	14+8	0	2+3	0
18	MF	(The Gambia) GAM	Bakery Jatta	29	5	19+6	4	3+1	1
25	MF	(Belgium) BEL	Orel Mangala	34	1	28+1	0	5	1
31	MF	(Germany) GER	Arianit Ferati	0	0	0	0	0	0
34	MF	(Germany) GER	Jonas David	2	0	0+2	0	0	0
39	MF	(Germany) GER	Mats Köhlert	3	0	1+2	0	0	0
41	MF	(Turkey) TUR	Berkay Özcan	17	2	11+4	1	1+1	1
Forwards
10	FW	(Germany) GER	Pierre-Michel Lasogga	31	19	17+10	13	3+1	6
15	FW	(Germany) GER	Jann-Fiete Arp	20	2	5+12	1	3	1
19	FW	(Germany) GER	Manuel Wintzheimer	7	3	3+4	3	0	0
20	FW	(South Korea) KOR	Hwang Hee-chan	21	2	15+5	2	0+1	0
23	FW	(Spain) ESP	Jairo Samperio	3	0	2	0	0+1	0
Players transferred out during the season
13	MF	(Germany) GER	Christoph Moritz	11	0	1+10	0	0	0
29	MF	(Germany) GER	Ville Matti Steinmann	3	0	3	0	0	0

Last updated: 19 May 2019
Source: Competitions

=== Goal scorers ===
Name	League	Cup	Total

=== Disciplinary record ===
Name	Bundesliga			Cup			Total		
Name	Yellow card	(yellow card) (red card)	Red card	Yellow card	(yellow card) (red card)	Red card	Yellow card	(yellow card) (red card)	Red card
(Finland) Ville Matti Steinmann	1						1		
Totals	1						1		
