= Tom Mickel =

German footballer (born 1989)

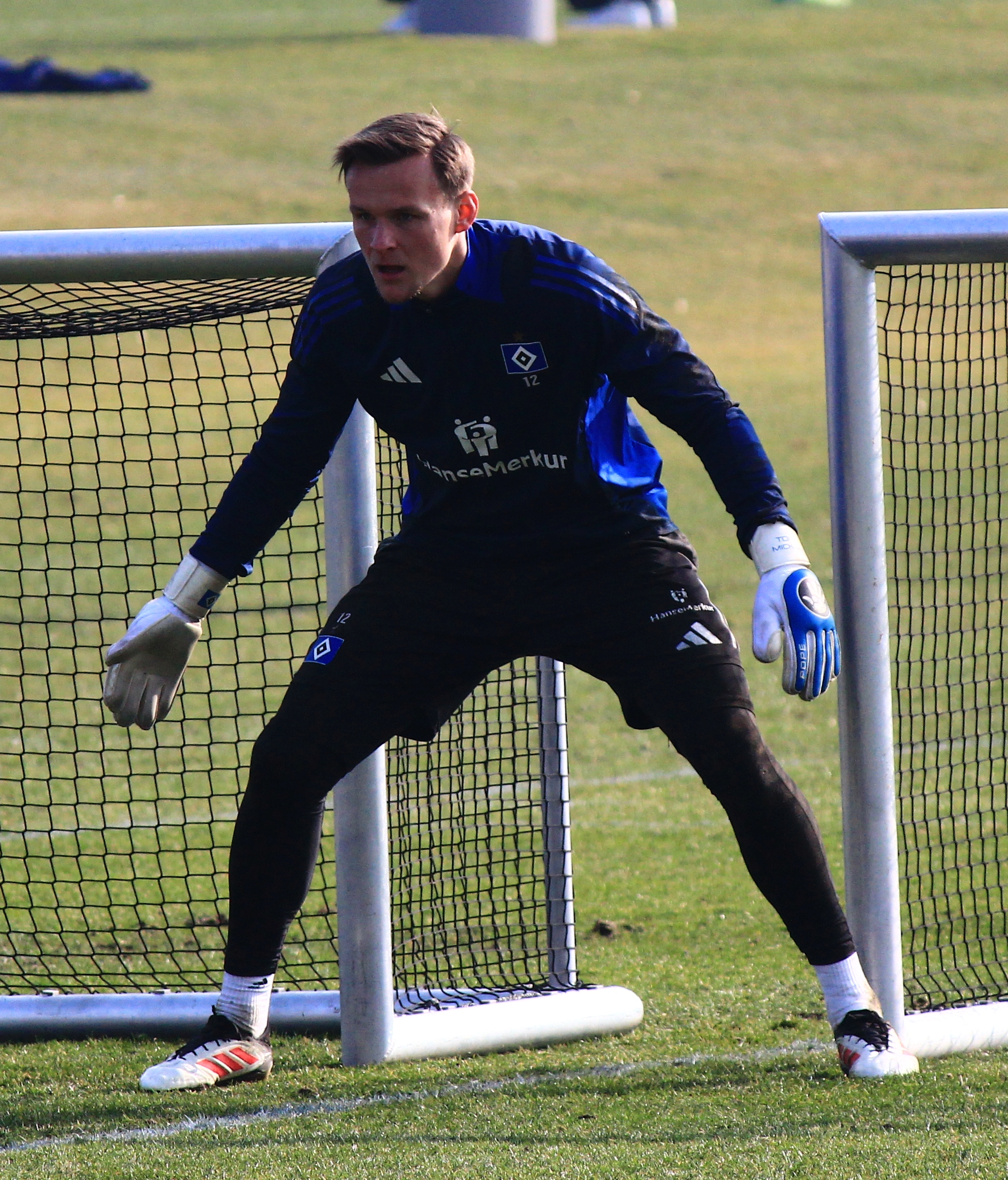
- Tom Mickel (2025)

Personal information
- Full name: Tom Lutz-Hans Mickel
- Date of birth: 19 April 1989 (age 37)
- Place of birth: Hoyerswerda, East Germany
- Height: 1.86 m (6 ft 1 in)
- Position: Goalkeeper

Youth career
- 1994–2003: Lausitz Hoyerswerda
- 2003–2006: Energie Cottbus

Senior career*
Years	Team	Apps	(Gls)
2006–2009	Energie Cottbus II	8	(0)
2009–2012	Hamburger SV II	66	(0)
2013–2015	Greuther Fürth	6	(0)
2013–2015	Greuther Fürth II	23	(0)
2015–2023	Hamburger SV II	45	(0)
2016–2025	Hamburger SV	5	(0)

International career
2005	Germany U16	2	(0)
2006	Germany U17	1	(0)
2007	Germany U18	2	(0)
2007–2008	Germany U19	4	(0)
2008–2009	Germany U20	3	(0)
Medal record
Men's football
Representing Germany
UEFA European Under-19 Championship
Winner	2008
- * Club domestic league appearances and goals

Tom Lutz-Hans Mickel (born 19 April 1989) is a German former professional goalkeeper. He is a former youth international for Germany.

A career backup, Mickel has spent most of his professional career at Hamburger SV apart from a two-year stint at Greuther Fürth. He has also gained 12 caps for various German national youth teams.

== Club career ==
=== Early career ===
Mickel played in the youth departments of FC Lausitz Hoyerswerda and then Energie Cottbus, where he was promoted to the first team ahead of the 2007–08 season and mostly competed in the second team.

=== Hamburger SV ===
For the 2009–10 season, Mickel moved to Hamburger SV. There, he signed a professional contract until 30 June 2012, which was extended in October 2011 by one year, to 2013. During his time in Hamburg, Mickel was continuously number two or three in the goalkeeper depth chart. In three and a half years, Frank Rost, Jaroslav Drobný and René Adler were preferred to him. He therefore mainly appeared for the second team, Hamburger SV II, in the fourth-tier Regionalliga Nord.

=== Greuther Fürth ===
During the winter break of the 2012–13 season, Mickel moved to league rivals SpVgg Greuther Fürth six months before the expiration of his contract. He signed a contract there until 30 June 2015. There, he was utilised for the remainder of the 2012–13 season and the 2013–14 season, initially in the second team in the fourth-tier Regionalliga Bayern. Mickel made his professional debut on the 8th match-day of the 2013–14 season when he was substituted on for the injured Wolfgang Hesl in the 77th minute of the match against 1860 Munich. Five more appearances followed, in which he filled in for Hesl. Mickel would then mainly play for the second team again. After his contract expired, Mickel left the club on 30 June 2015.

=== Return to Hamburger SV ===
At the beginning of the 2015–16 season, Mickel completed a trial practice session at his former club Hamburger SV as part of the team's training camp in Graubünden in order to recommend himself for a permanent commitment. After the trial practice, Mickel was signed to the second team. He signed a contract until the end of the 2015–16 Regionalliga season. On 14 May 2016, Mickel made his Bundesliga debut for HSV in a 3–1 win over FC Augsburg on the last match-day, which was made possible by injuries to René Adler and Andreas Hirzel. Mickel made 20 appearances in the Regionalliga for HSV II.

In the 2016–17 season, Mickel beat out Hirzel for the position as third goalkeeper of the first team. He also made his second Bundesliga appearance for HSV in Augsburg when FC Augsburg beat HSV 4–0 on 30 April 2017. After the end of the season, Mickel extended his expiring contract with HSV until 2019. For the second team, Mickel was utilised in 17 games.

Towards the end of the first half of the 2017–18 season, Mickel was temporarily promoted to backup goalkeeper behind Christian Mathenia by head coach Markus Gisdol as the replacement of Julian Pollersbeck because of his good performances at practice. During the season, Mickel made five times for the second team.

Before the 2018–19 season, in which HSV played in the 2. Bundesliga for the first time after relegation, Mickel extended his contract until 30 June 2021. After Mathenia had left for newly promoted Bundesliga side 1. FC Nürnberg, Mathenia was now the backup to new first keeper Pollersbeck ahead of Morten Behrens, who had been promoted from the second team to the professional squad. Mickel appeared for HSV in the DFB Cup first round matchup under new head coach Christian Titz against Oberliga club TuS Erndtebrück and under his successor Hannes Wolf he played 3 matches in the 2. Bundesliga after Pollersbeck fell out with an injury. He also made one appearance in the Regionalliga.

A new goalkeeper, Daniel Heuer Fernandes, was ahead of the 2019–20 season and subsequently named the starter by the new head coach Dieter Hecking. Mickel was preferred as the backup goalkeeper over Pollersbeck. He also remained the backup when Heuer Fernandes was replaced by Pollersbeck on 31 May 2020, in a league match against SV Wehen Wiesbaden. From the following round, however, Heuer Fernandes was named backup to Pollersbeck with Mickel demoted to third option. While Mickel did not play a competitive game for the first team, he made two appearances in the Regionalliga for the second team.

For the 2020–21 season, Mickel was named backup to new signing Sven Ulreich by new head coach Daniel Thioune, with Heuer Fernandes completing the goalkeeping trio as third option in the HSV goal.

At the end of the 24/25 season, the season HSV promoted, he announced his retirement from football.

== International career ==
Mickel made two appearances for the Germany U16 team in March 2005. Between September and November 2007, he was played in three games for the Germany under-19 team. At the under-19 level, Bender was a part of the team that won the 2008 European Under-19 Championship. Between September 2008 and May 2009, Mickel made three appearances for the Germany U20 side.

== Personal life ==
Mickel was born in Hoyerswerda, East Germany on 19 April 1989.

== Career statistics ==
Appearances and goals by club, season and competition
Club	Season	League			Cup		Other		Total	
Club	Season	League	Apps	Goals	Apps	Goals	Apps	Goals	Apps	Goals
Energie Cottbus II	2006–07	Oberliga NOFV-Süd	2	0	—		—		2	0
Energie Cottbus II	2007–08	Regionalliga Nord	2	0	—		—		2	0
Energie Cottbus II	2008–09	Regionalliga Nord	4	0	—		—		4	0
Energie Cottbus II	Total		8	0	—		—		8	0
Hamburger SV II	2009–10	Regionalliga Nord	31	0	—		—		31	0
Hamburger SV II	2010–11	Regionalliga Nord	21	0	—		—		21	0
Hamburger SV II	2011–12	Regionalliga Nord	3	0	—		—		3	0
Hamburger SV II	2012–13	Regionalliga Nord	11	0	—		—		11	0
Hamburger SV II	Total		66	0	—		—		66	0
Greuther Fürth II	2012–13	Regionalliga Bayern	9	0	—		—		9	0
Greuther Fürth II	2013–14	Regionalliga Bayern	12	0	—		—		12	0
Greuther Fürth II	2014–15	Regionalliga Bayern	2	0	—		—		2	0
Greuther Fürth II	Total		23	0	—		—		23	0
Greuther Fürth	2012–13	Bundesliga	0	0	0	0	—		0	0
Greuther Fürth	2013–14	2. Bundesliga	0	0	0	0	0	0	0	0
Greuther Fürth	2014–15	2. Bundesliga	6	0	2	0	—		8	0
Greuther Fürth	Total		6	0	2	0	0	0	8	0
Hamburger SV II	2015–16	Regionalliga Nord	20	0	—		—		20	0
Hamburger SV II	2016–17	Regionalliga Nord	4	0	—		—		4	0
Hamburger SV II	2017–18	Regionalliga Nord	5	0	—		—		5	0
Hamburger SV II	2018–19	Regionalliga Nord	1	0	—		—		1	0
Hamburger SV II	2019–20	Regionalliga Nord	2	0	—		—		2	0
Hamburger SV II	2023–24	Regionalliga Nord	2	0	—		—		2	0
Hamburger SV II	Total		34	0	—		—		34	0
Hamburger SV	2015–16	Bundesliga	1	0	0	0	—		1	0
Hamburger SV	2016–17	Bundesliga	1	0	0	0	—		1	0
Hamburger SV	2017–18	Bundesliga	0	0	0	0	—		0	0
Hamburger SV	2018–19	2. Bundesliga	3	0	1	0	—		4	0
Hamburger SV	2019–20	2. Bundesliga	0	0	0	0	—		0	0
Hamburger SV	2020–21	2. Bundesliga	0	0	0	0	—		0	0
Hamburger SV	2021–22	2. Bundesliga	0	0	0	0	0	0	0	0
Hamburger SV	2022–23	2. Bundesliga	0	0	0	0	0	0	0	0
Hamburger SV	2023–24	2. Bundesliga	0	0	0	0	—		0	0
Hamburger SV	2024–25	Bundesliga	0	0	0	0	—		0	0
Hamburger SV	Total		5	0	1	0	0	0	6	0
Career total			142	0	1	0	0	0	143	0

== Honours ==
=== International ===
Germany

- UEFA European Under-19 Championship: 2008
