= Fiete Arp =

German footballer (born 2000)

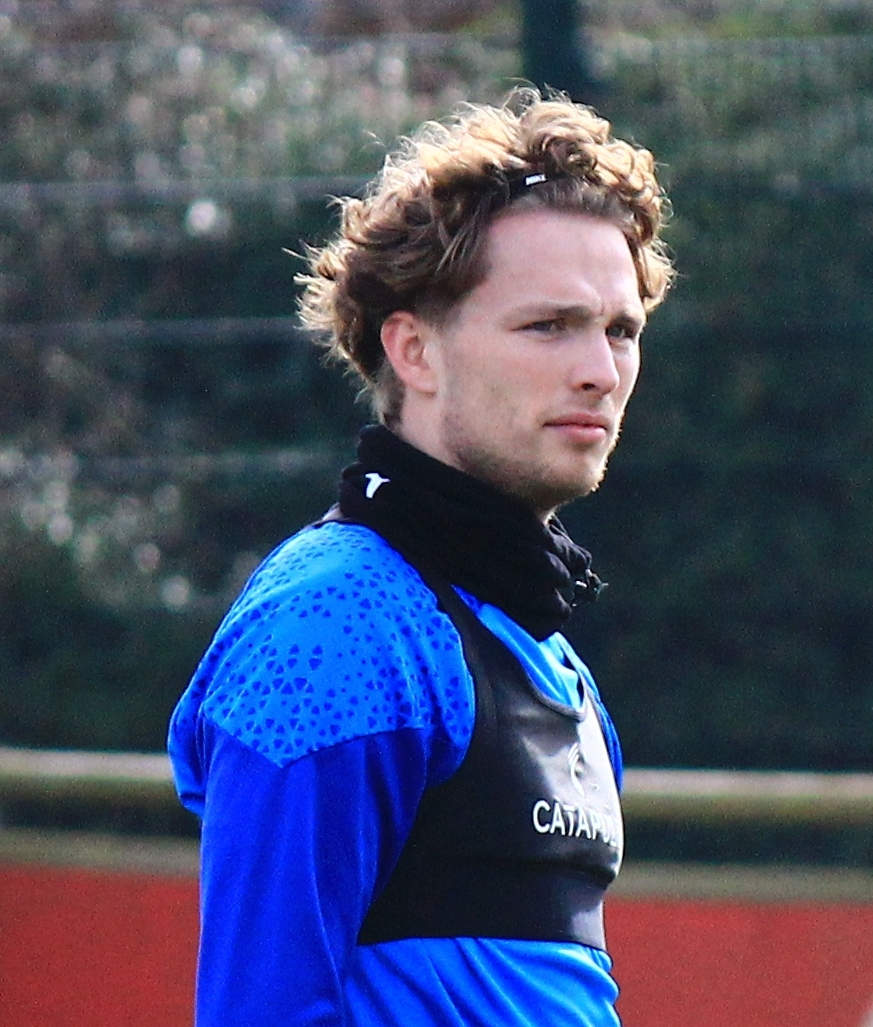
- Arp with Holstein Kiel in 2025

Personal information
- Full name: Jann-Fiete Arp
- Date of birth: 6 January 2000 (age 26)
- Place of birth: Bad Segeberg, Germany
- Height: 1.86 m (6 ft 1 in)
- Position: Forward

Team information
- Current team: OB
- Number: 7

Youth career
- 2004–2010: SV Wahlstedt
- 2010–2018: Hamburger SV

Senior career*
Years	Team	Apps	(Gls)
2017–2019	Hamburger SV	35	(3)
2018–2019	Hamburger SV II	7	(3)
2019–2022	Bayern Munich	0	(0)
2019–2022	Bayern Munich II	43	(8)
2021–2022	→ Holstein Kiel (loan)	24	(2)
2022–2025	Holstein Kiel	66	(8)
2025–	OB	40	(13)

International career
2015–2016	Germany U16	4	(0)
2016–2017	Germany U17	19	(18)
2018–2019	Germany U19	5	(2)
- * Club domestic league appearances and goals as of 13:51, 3 November 2026 (UTC)

Jann-Fiete Arp (German pronunciation: [ˈfiːtə ˈʔaʁp]; born 6 January 2000) is a German professional footballer who plays as a forward for Danish Superliga club OB.

A graduate of Hamburger SV's academy, Arp became the first Bundesliga goalscorer born in the 2000s when he struck for Hamburg against Hertha BSC in October 2017, aged 17 years 295 days. After 35 senior appearances he joined Bayern Munich in 2019, featuring mainly for their reserve side before spending a season on loan at Holstein Kiel. He signed permanently for Kiel in 2022 and played during the club's debut Bundesliga campaign before moving to newly promoted Danish Superliga club OB on a three-year contract in June 2025.

Internationally, Arp captained Germany's under-17 team to the quarter-finals of the 2017 FIFA U-17 World Cup, finishing joint-fourth in the scoring charts with five goals and winning the tournament's Goal of the Tournament award. He has represented Germany at every youth level from U16 to U21 and received the Fritz Walter Medal in gold for the U17 age group in 2017.

== Club career ==
=== Early career ===
Arp was born in Bad Segeberg, Schleswig-Holstein and grew up with his separated parents in Bad Segeberg and nearby Wahlstedt. At the age of 4, he started playing football at SV Wahlstedt. His first major success was winning the 2008 Gothia Cup with the U11 team of the Segeberg District Football Association.

For the 2010–11 season, Arp moved to the Hamburger SV youth academy, where he initially played with the U11 team. In the 2015–16 and 2016–17 seasons, Arp scored 36 goals in a total of 44 appearances in the Under 17 Bundesliga and was the top scorer of the North/Northeast group with 26 goals in the 2016–17 season. During the winter break of the 2016–17 season, Arp was included with the Hamburger SV first team under head coach Markus Gisdol. In the second half of the season, in parallel to appearances in the U17 league – he also appeared in the Under 19 Bundesliga, in which he scored 2 goals in 4 appearances by the end of the season. For his achievements, Arp received the golden Fritz Walter Medal in the U17 age group in July 2017.

=== Hamburger SV ===
Ahead of the 2017–18 season, Arp was included in the first-team squad besides being part of the U19, for which he was still eligible to play for two more seasons. He signed a contract extension until 30 June 2019 before the season and completed the summer training camp with the professionals. After pre-season, he again mainly took part in U19 practice, as he could only train once a week with the professionals because of his upcoming Abitur, which he completed at the Gymnasium Heidberg. Nevertheless, after scoring seven goals in three games in the Under 19 Bundesliga, manager Markus Gisdol called him up for the matchday squad for the first time for the Nordderby against rivals Werder Bremen on 30 September 2017. Arp made his debut in the game, coming on as an 89th-minute substitute for Bobby Wood. This made him the first Bundesliga player born in the 2000s.

On 28 October 2017, Arp scored his first Bundesliga goal against Hertha BSC, thus becoming the first Bundesliga player born in the 2000s to score a goal. At age 17 and 295 days, he became the Hamburger SV senior team's youngest goalscorer ever and the seventh-youngest goalscorer in Bundesliga history. On the following matchday, Arp was in the starting line-up for the first time in the 3–1 win over VfB Stuttgart and scored the final goal of the match. Afterwards, Arp was considered one of Germany's greatest striker talents and an upcoming national team player. In the further course of the season, Arp could not build on these achievements under Gisdol's successors Bernd Hollerbach and Christian Titz, who had already coached him in the U17. He lost his starting spot due to high school exams and after catching some common colds. In total, Arp made 18 Bundesliga appearances and two goals that season, alongside and five appearances and seven goals for the U19, who finished runner-up in the North/Northeast division. With the first-team, however, he suffered relegation to the 2. Bundesliga—the first time in history that HSV would not be present in the Bundesliga.

Before the 2018–19 season, now 18-year-old Arp extended his contract with HSV until 30 June 2020. At the beginning of February 2019, it became known that an agreement had been reached with Bayern Munich, which contained a "flexible transfer period". The date of the official move — 1 July 2019 or 1 July 2020 — would be determined by Arp himself. At the beginning of the season, Arp was the third striker on the depth chart behind Pierre-Michel Lasogga and Manuel Wintzheimer and was not in the matchday squad on the first few matchdays, but made three appearances for the reserves in the fourth-tier Regionalliga Nord, scoring three goals. Arp made his first appearance of the season for the first team in the first round of the DFB-Pokal in a 5–3 victory against fifth-tier club TuS Erndtebrück, where he contributed with a goal. Under manager Titz, Arp subsequently made four league appearances, with two of them being in the starting eleven. After Hannes Wolf took over the reins at the end of October 2018, Arp continued mostly as a substitute, and appeared as a left winger, while Lasogga and Hwang Hee-chan were given preference at the striker position. In the second half of the season, Arp remained in the reserve role. He appeared as a substitute on six occasions and only made one start in his last HSV game, with the team already out of a direct promotion spot.

=== Bayern Munich ===
On 7 February 2019, it was announced that Arp would join Bayern Munich at the beginning of either the 2019–20 season or the 2020–21 season. He ultimately joined Bayern Munich on 1 July 2019. At the beginning of the season, now 19-year-old Arp was mostly not included matchday squad, as head coach Niko Kovač preferred second-team strikers Kwasi Okyere Wriedt and Joshua Zirkzee as backups to undisputed starter Robert Lewandowski. Therefore, Arp made his first competitive appearance for the club for the reserves in the 3. Liga. At the end of September, he suffered a scaphoid bone fracture during practice and had to undergo surgery. During the international break in November, Arp returned to first-team practice under Kovač's successor Hansi Flick, but two days later during practice he suffered a radial bone injury which sidelined him for the remained of the first half of the season. During his absence, the one year younger striker Zirkzee was promoted to the professional team by Flick scored two goals in two substitutions. Arp rejoined the team for the winter training camp in Doha. In early February, he was removed from the UEFA Champions League squad for the knockout phase for winter transfer window newcomer Álvaro Odriozola. After the winter break, Arp was behind Wriedt, Zirkzee and Leon Dajaku on the depth chart for the reserves under head coach Sebastian Hoeneß. The season was subsequently interrupted due to the COVID-19 pandemic. After the resumption of play, Arp made a few more appearances for the reserves before injuring himself as he scored his third season goal for the team, once again sidelining him for some games. Arp finished the season with 3 goals in 12 appearances as Bayern Munich II became 3. Liga champions.

After a disappointing first season in which he failed to make a single Bundesliga appearance, Arp was made a permanent member of the club's secondary team in order to receive more playing time. In October, he nevertheless made his first-team debut in the first team when he was substituted in the final phase of the postponed DFB-Pokal first-round match against 1. FC Düren. He also benefited from the fact that numerous Bayern internationals had been on international duties the day before and were therefore not called up by Flick. Thus, in the 3–0 victory, only outfielders of the reserves and U19 were available as replacements. After the game, however, Flick stated: "For him, it is important that he has a home. And his home is currently the U23s". For the reserves, Arp was initially a regular starter under new head coach Holger Seitz, but had to settle for a role as substitute behind Lenn Jastremski at times. After the managerial duo of Danny Schwarz and Martín Demichelis had taken over the relegation-threatened reserves for the last 8 games of the season, Armindo Sieb was the preferred starter in attack. Arp made 30 appearances in the 3. Liga for the 2020–21 season, in which he scored 5 goals, as Bayern Munich II relegated to the Regionalliga Bayern. He made only the one cup appearance for the first team.

=== Holstein Kiel ===
On 25 June 2021, Arp returned to his home state of Schleswig-Holstein, joining Holstein Kiel on a season-long loan from Bayern Munich. Deployed as the centre-forward in head coach Ole Werner's 4–3–3, he scored on his competitive debut in the DFB-Pokal first-round win over fourth-tier SC Weiche Flensburg 08, and added his first league goal in a 3–0 victory against Erzgebirge Aue on matchday 5. Kiel, promotion play-off finalists the previous spring, slid into relegation danger and Werner resigned after seven league matches with the side 15th. Successor Marcel Rapp preferred new signing Benedikt Pichler, and Arp completed 2021–22 with two goals from 24 league appearances, nine of them in the starting line-up.

Bayern and Kiel agreed a permanent transfer on 1 July 2022, and Arp signed a contract to 30 June 2024. He remained largely a squad player in the 2022–23 season, scoring once in 26 2. Bundesliga matches.

Arp's fortunes improved in the 2023–24 season. After only two substitute outings in the first nine fixtures, he broke into the starting line-up in October and began seven of the next eight matches, contributing five goals as Kiel secured the unofficial Herbstmeisterschaft (autumn championship). A partial adductor tendon tear sustained in the last pre-break fixture sidelined him until late March 2024; during rehabilitation he extended his contract to June 2026. He finished the promotion season with five goals from 17 league appearances (eight starts), and Kiel returned to the Bundesliga as runners-up.

The 2024–25 campaign brought Arp back to the top flight after six years, but again mainly as a reserve. Of his 23 appearances he started only three and scored two goals, and Kiel were relegated straight back to the 2. Bundesliga at season's end.

=== OB ===
Ahead of the 2025–26 campaign, Arp moved abroad for the first time, joining newly promoted Danish Superliga club Odense Boldklub (OB) on a free transfer. He agreed a three-year deal running to 30 June 2028 and arrived at the same time as compatriot Alexander Zorniger, who had been appointed head coach earlier in the summer.

== International career ==
Arp was part of the German U17 team in May 2017, scoring seven goals in the 2017 UEFA European Under-17 Championship to finish second on the top goalscorers list behind Amine Gouiri. In one of the games, he scored a perfect hat-trick in a record time of 13 minutes against Bosnia and Herzegovina U17.

Later that year, in October 2017, Arp played in the 2017 FIFA U-17 World Cup in India, where he scored five goals. In total, Arp scored 18 goals in 19 appearances for the U17 team.

From November 2018 to March 2019, Arp was active for the German U19 team, where he scored 2 goals in 5 games.

== Career statistics ==
As of match played 1 November 2026

Appearances and goals by club, season and competition
Club	Season	League			National cup (Note: Includes DFB-Pokal, Danish Cup)		Total	
Club	Season	Division	Apps	Goals	Apps	Goals	Apps	Goals
Hamburger SV	2017–18	Bundesliga	18	2	0	0	18	2
Hamburger SV	2018–19	2. Bundesliga	17	1	3	1	20	2
Hamburger SV	Total		35	3	3	1	38	4
Hamburger SV II	2018–19	Regionalliga Nord	7	3	—		7	3
Bayern Munich II	2019–20	3. Liga	12	3	—		12	3
Bayern Munich II	2020–21	3. Liga	30	5	—		30	5
Bayern Munich II	Total		42	8	—		42	8
Bayern Munich	2019–20	Bundesliga	0	0	0	0	0	0
Bayern Munich	2020–21	Bundesliga	0	0	1	0	1	0
Bayern Munich	Total		0	0	1	0	1	0
Holstein Kiel (loan)	2021–22	2. Bundesliga	24	2	2	1	26	3
Holstein Kiel	2022–23	2. Bundesliga	26	1	1	0	27	1
Holstein Kiel	2023–24	2. Bundesliga	17	5	0	0	17	5
Holstein Kiel	2024–25	Bundesliga	23	2	2	0	25	2
Holstein Kiel	Total		90	10	5	1	95	11
OB	2025–26	Danish Superliga	30	10	4	1	34	11
OB	2026–27	Danish Superliga	10	3	3	0	13	3
OB	Total		40	13	7	1	47	14
Career total			214	37	16	3	230	40

== Honours ==
Bayern Munich

- Bundesliga: 2019–20
- DFB-Pokal: 2019–20
- DFL-Supercup: 2020
- UEFA Champions League: 2019–20
- UEFA Super Cup: 2020

Bayern Munich II

- 3. Liga: 2019–20

Individual

- Fritz Walter Medal U17 Gold: 2017
- Hamburger SV Young Player of the Season: 2017–18
