= 2017–18 Hamburger SV season =

Hamburger SV
2017–18 season
- President: Jens Meier
- Manager: Markus Gisdol (until 21 January); Bernd Hollerbach (22 January – 12 March); Christian Titz (from 12 March)
- Stadium: Volksparkstadion
- Bundesliga: 17th (relegated)
- DFB-Pokal: First round
- Top goalscorer: League: Lewis Holtby (6); All: Lewis Holtby (6)
- Highest home attendance: 57,000
- Lowest home attendance: 40,983
- Average home league attendance: 50,657
- Biggest win: Hamburg 3–0 Hoffenheim
- Biggest defeat: Bayern 6–0 Hamburg
Home colours	Away colours	Third colours
- All statistics correct as of 21 May 2018.

The 2017–18 Hamburger SV season was the 99th season in the football club's history and 55th consecutive and overall season in the top flight of German football, the Bundesliga, having been promoted from the Oberliga Nord in 1963. Finishing 17th, Hamburg was relegated for the first time in the Bundesliga's 55-year history. In addition to the domestic league, Hamburger SV also participated in this season's edition of the domestic cup, the DFB-Pokal. This was the 65th season for Hamburg in the Volksparkstadion, located in Hamburg, Germany. The season covers a period from 1 July 2017 to 30 June 2018.

== Players ==
=== Squad information ===
As of 10 March 2018

Note: Flags indicate national team as defined under FIFA eligibility rules; some limited exceptions apply. Players may hold more than one non-FIFA nationality.

No.	Pos.	Nation	Player
1	GK	GER	Christian Mathenia
2	DF	GER	Dennis Diekmeier
4	DF	NED	Rick van Drongelen
5	DF	ALB	Mërgim Mavraj (vice-captain)
6	DF	BRA	Douglas Santos
7	FW	USA	Bobby Wood
8	MF	GER	Lewis Holtby
9	DF	GRE	Kyriakos Papadopoulos (third-captain)
11	FW	GER	André Hahn
12	MF	BRA	Walace
13	GK	GER	Julian Pollersbeck
14	MF	GER	Aaron Hunt
15	FW	GER	Luca Waldschmidt
16	MF	SUI	Vasilije Janjičić
17	MF	SRB	Filip Kostić
18	MF	GAM	Bakery Jatta

No.	Pos.	Nation	Player
19	FW	GER	Sven Schipplock
20	MF	SWE	Albin Ekdal
22	DF	GER	Bjarne Thoelke
23	MF	BIH	Sejad Salihović
24	DF	JPN	Gōtoku Sakai (captain)
25	MF	GER	Mats Köhlert
26	FW	GER	Törles Knöll
27	MF	GER	Nicolai Müller
28	DF	GER	Gideon Jung
30	GK	SUI	Andreas Hirzel
36	GK	GER	Tom Mickel
38	DF	GER	Jonas Behounek
40	FW	GER	Jann-Fiete Arp
43	FW	JPN	Tatsuya Ito
46	DF	GER	Stephan Ambrosius
47	DF	GER	Josha Vagnoman

== Competitions ==
Win Draw Loss

=== Overview ===
Competition	First match	Last match	Starting round	Final position	Record							
Competition	First match	Last match	Starting round	Final position	Pld	W	D	L	GF	GA	GD	Win %
Bundesliga	19 August 2017	12 May 2018	Matchday 1	17th (relegated)	34	8	7	19	29	53	−24	23.53
DFB-Pokal	13 August 2017	13 August 2017	First round	First round	1	0	0	1	1	3	−2	0.00
Total					35	8	7	20	30	56	−26	22.86

Last updated: 21 May 2018
Source: Competitions

=== Bundesliga ===
==== League table ====
Pos	Team	Pld	W	D	L	GF	GA	GD	Pts	Qualification or relegation
14	Mainz 05	34	9	9	16	38	52	−14	36	
15	SC Freiburg	34	8	12	14	32	56	−24	36	
16	VfL Wolfsburg (O)	34	6	15	13	36	48	−12	33	Qualification for the relegation play-offs
17	Hamburger SV (R)	34	8	7	19	29	53	−24	31	Relegation to 2. Bundesliga
18	1. FC Köln (R)	34	5	7	22	35	70	−35	22	Relegation to 2. Bundesliga

Source: DFB
Rules for classification: 1) Points; 2) Goal difference; 3) Goals scored; 4) Head-to-head results; 5) Head-to-head away goals scored; 6) Away goals scored; 7) Play-off.
(O) Play-off winners; (R) Relegated

==== Results summary ====
Overall								Home						Away					
Pld	W	D	L	GF	GA	GD	Pts	W	D	L	GF	GA	GD	W	D	L	GF	GA	GD
34	8	7	19	29	53	−24	31	6	4	7	17	19	−2	2	3	12	12	34	−22

Last updated: 21 May 2018.
Source: Bundesliga

==== Results by round ====
Round	1	2	3	4	5	6	7	8	9	10	11	12	13	14	15	16	17	18	19	20	21	22	23	24	25	26	27	28	29	30	31	32	33	34
Ground	H	A	H	A	H	A	H	A	H	A	H	A	H	A	H	H	A	A	H	A	H	A	H	A	H	A	H	A	H	A	H	A	A	H
Result	W	W	L	L	L	L	D	L	L	L	W	L	W	D	D	L	L	L	L	D	D	L	L	L	D	L	L	D	W	L	W	W	L	W
Position	5	3	7	8	11	15	16	15	16	16	15	15	15	15	15	16	17	17	17	17	17	17	17	17	17	17	18	18	17	17	17	17	17	17

Updated to match(es) played on 21 May 2018. Source: Bundesliga
A = Away; H = Home; W = Win; D = Draw; L = Loss

==== Matches ====
19 August 2017 1	Hamburger SV	1–0	FC Augsburg	Hamburg
15:30 CEST (UTC+2)	Müller 8'	Report		Stadium: Volksparkstadion; Attendance: 49,449; Referee: Daniel Siebert

25 August 2017 2	1. FC Köln	1–3	Hamburger SV	Cologne
20:30 CEST (UTC+2)	Sørensen 90+7'	Report	Hahn 28'; Wood 34'; Holtby 90+10'	Stadium: RheinEnergieStadion; Attendance: 50,000; Referee: Felix Brych

8 September 2017 3	Hamburger SV	0–2	RB Leipzig	Hamburg
20:30 CEST (UTC+2)		Report	Keïta 67'; Werner 75'	Stadium: Volksparkstadion; Attendance: 50,231; Referee: Deniz Aytekin

15 September 2017 4	Hannover 96	2–0	Hamburger SV	Hanover
20:30 CEST (UTC+2)	Harnik 50'; Bebou 82'	Report		Stadium: HDI-Arena; Attendance: 49,000; Referee: Robert Hartmann

20 September 2017 5	Hamburger SV	0–3	Borussia Dortmund	Hamburg
20:30 CEST (UTC+2)		Report	Kagawa 24'; Aubameyang 63'; Pulisic 79'	Stadium: Volksparkstadion; Attendance: 52,962; Referee: Felix Zwayer

24 September 2017 6	Bayer Leverkusen	3–0	Hamburger SV	Leverkusen
18:00 CEST (UTC+2)	Volland 20', 83'; Alario 23'	Report		Stadium: BayArena; Attendance: 27,601; Referee: Robert Kampka

30 September 2017 7	Hamburger SV	0–0	Werder Bremen	Hamburg
18:30 CEST (UTC+2)		Report		Stadium: Volksparkstadion; Attendance: 54,613; Referee: Deniz Aytekin

14 October 2017 8	Mainz 05	3–2	Hamburger SV	Mainz
15:30 CEST (UTC+2)	Maxim 2'; Bell 52'; Latza 58'	Report	Walace 9'; Salihović 90+2' (pen.)	Stadium: Opel Arena; Attendance: 30,371; Referee: Felix Brych

21 October 2017 9	Hamburger SV	0–1	Bayern Munich	Hamburg
18:30 CEST (UTC+2)		Report	Tolisso 52'	Stadium: Volksparkstadion; Attendance: 57,000; Referee: Marco Fritz

28 October 2017 10	Hertha BSC	2–1	Hamburger SV	Berlin
15:30 CEST (UTC+2)	Stark 17'; Rekik 50'	Report	Arp 73'	Stadium: Olympiastadion Berlin; Attendance: 52,131; Referee: Felix Brych

4 November 2017 11	Hamburger SV	3–1	VfB Stuttgart	Hamburg
15:30 CET (UTC+1)	Hunt 20'; Kostić 65'; Arp 69'	Report	Ginczek 55' (pen.)	Stadium: Volksparkstadion; Attendance: 54,976; Referee: Guido Winkmann

19 November 2017 12	Schalke 04	2–0	Hamburger SV	Gelsenkirchen
15:30 CET (UTC+1)	Di Santo 17' (pen.); Burgstaller 77'	Report		Stadium: Veltins-Arena; Attendance: 62,271; Referee: Robert Hartmann

26 November 2017 13	Hamburger SV	3–0	1899 Hoffenheim	Hamburg
15:30 CET (UTC+1)	Akpoguma 6' (o.g.); Kostić 75'; Jung 88'	Report		Stadium: Volksparkstadion; Attendance: 46,470; Referee: Bastian Dankert

1 December 2017 14	SC Freiburg	0–0	Hamburger SV	Freiburg
20:30 CET (UTC+1)		Report		Stadium: Schwarzwald-Stadion; Attendance: 24,000; Referee: Benjamin Brand

9 December 2017 15	Hamburger SV	0–0	VfL Wolfsburg	Hamburg
15:30 CET (UTC+1)		Report		Stadium: Volksparkstadion; Attendance: 45,226; Referee: Christian Dingert

12 December 2017 16	Hamburger SV	1–2	Eintracht Frankfurt	Hamburg
20:30 CET (UTC+1)	Papadopoulos 9'	Report	Wolf 16'; Gaćinović 24'	Stadium: Volksparkstadion; Attendance: 40,983; Referee: Manuel Gräfe

15 December 2017 17	Borussia Mönchengladbach	3–1	Hamburger SV	Mönchengladbach
20:30 CET (UTC+1)	Hazard 9'; Raffael 74', 79'	Report	Hahn 53'	Stadium: Borussia-Park; Attendance: 51,409; Referee: Markus Schmidt

13 January 2018 18	FC Augsburg	1–0	Hamburger SV	Augsburg
15:30 CET (UTC+1)	Koo 45'	Report		Stadium: WWK Arena; Attendance: 30,087; Referee: Manuel Gräfe

20 January 2018 19	Hamburger SV	0–2	1. FC Köln	Hamburg
18:30 CET (UTC+1)		Report	Terodde 27', 67'	Stadium: Volksparkstadion; Attendance: 52,674; Referee: Guido Winkmann

27 January 2018 20	RB Leipzig	1–1	Hamburger SV	Leipzig
15:30 CET (UTC+1)	Bruma 9'	Report	Kostić 29'	Stadium: Red Bull Arena; Attendance: 42,558; Referee: Benjamin Cortus

4 February 2018 21	Hamburger SV	1–1	Hannover 96	Hamburg
18:00 CET (UTC+1)	Kostić 86'	Report	Fossum 37'	Stadium: Volksparkstadion; Attendance: 46,016; Referee: Sascha Stegemann

10 February 2018 22	Borussia Dortmund	2–0	Hamburger SV	Dortmund
15:30 CET (UTC+1)	Batshuayi 49'; Götze 90+2'	Report		Stadium: Signal Iduna Park; Attendance: 81,360; Referee: Marco Fritz

17 February 2018 23	Hamburger SV	1–2	Bayer Leverkusen	Hamburg
15:30 CET (UTC+1)	Hahn 70'	Report	Bailey 40'; Havertz 50'	Stadium: Volksparkstadion; Attendance: 45,691; Referee: Felix Brych

24 February 2018 24	Werder Bremen	1–0	Hamburger SV	Bremen
18:30 CET (UTC+1)	Van Drongelen 86' (o.g.)	Report		Stadium: Weser-Stadion; Attendance: 42,100; Referee: Felix Zwayer

3 March 2018 25	Hamburger SV	0–0	Mainz 05	Hamburg
15:30 CET (UTC+1)		Report		Stadium: Volksparkstadion; Attendance: 46,739; Referee: Markus Schmidt

10 March 2018 26	Bayern Munich	6–0	Hamburger SV	Munich
15:30 CET (UTC+1)	Ribéry 8', 81'; Lewandowski 12', 19', 90' (pen.); Robben 55'	Report		Stadium: Allianz Arena; Attendance: 75,000; Referee: Christian Dingert

17 March 2018 27	Hamburger SV	1–2	Hertha BSC	Hamburg
15:30 CET (UTC+1)	Douglas Santos 25'	Report	Lazaro 56'; Kalou 63'	Stadium: Volksparkstadion; Attendance: 52,159; Referee: Robert Kampka

31 March 2018 28	VfB Stuttgart	1–1	Hamburger SV	Stuttgart
15:30 CEST (UTC+2)	Ginczek 44'	Report	Holtby 18'	Stadium: Mercedes-Benz Arena; Attendance: 55,000; Referee: Felix Brych

7 April 2018 29	Hamburger SV	3–2	Schalke 04	Hamburg
18:30 CEST (UTC+2)	Kostić 17'; Holtby 52'; Hunt 84'	Report	Naldo 9'; Burgstaller 63'	Stadium: Volksparkstadion; Attendance: 54,137; Referee: Christian Dingert

14 April 2018 30	1899 Hoffenheim	2–0	Hamburger SV	Sinsheim
15:30 CEST (UTC+2)	Gnabry 18'; Szalai 27'	Report		Stadium: Wirsol Rhein-Neckar-Arena; Attendance: 30,150; Referee: Harm Osmers

21 April 2018 31	Hamburger SV	1–0	SC Freiburg	Hamburg
15:30 CEST (UTC+2)	Holtby 54'	Report		Stadium: Volksparkstadion; Attendance: 54,847; Referee: Benjamin Cortus

28 April 2018 32	VfL Wolfsburg	1–3	Hamburger SV	Wolfsburg
15:30 CEST (UTC+2)	Brekalo 78'	Report	Wood 43' (pen.); Holtby 45+1'; Waldschmidt 90+3'	Stadium: Volkswagen Arena; Attendance: 29,400; Referee: Daniel Siebert

5 May 2018 33	Eintracht Frankfurt	3–0	Hamburger SV	Frankfurt
15:30 CEST (UTC+2)	Wolf 31'; Mascarell 77'; Meier 90+1'	Report		Stadium: Commerzbank-Arena; Attendance: 51,500; Referee: Deniz Aytekin

12 May 2018 34	Hamburger SV	2–1	Borussia Mönchengladbach	Hamburg
15:30 CEST (UTC+2)	Hunt 11' (pen.); Holtby 63'	Report	Drmić 28'	Stadium: Volksparkstadion; Attendance: 57,000; Referee: Felix Brych

=== DFB-Pokal ===
13 August 2017 First round	VfL Osnabrück	3–1	Hamburger SV	Osnabrück
15:30 CEST (UTC+2)	Savran 39'; Heider 61'; Arslan 71'	Report	Wood 74' (pen.)	Stadium: Stadion an der Bremer Brücke; Attendance: 16,000; Referee: Deniz Aytekin
