= Khaled Narey =

Togolese footballer (born 1994)

Personal information
- Date of birth: 23 July 1994 (age 32)
- Place of birth: Neuwied, Germany
- Height: 1.80 m (5 ft 11 in)
- Positions: Winger; full-back

Youth career
- 2003–2008: SV Bergfried Leverkusen
- 2009–2010: SV Bergisch Gladbach
- 2010–2013: Bayer Leverkusen

Senior career*
Years	Team	Apps	(Gls)
2013–2014	Bayer Leverkusen II	36	(8)
2014–2016	Borussia Dortmund II	34	(1)
2015–2016	→ Paderborn (loan)	13	(1)
2016–2018	Greuther Fürth	65	(8)
2018–2021	Hamburger SV	77	(11)
2021–2022	Fortuna Düsseldorf	31	(8)
2022–2023	PAOK	28	(7)
2023–2025	Al-Khaleej	41	(10)
2025	Al-Ula	9	(2)
2025–2026	Al-Okhdood	22	(4)

International career^{‡}
2023–	Togo	8	(1)
- * Club domestic league appearances and goals as of 16 May 2026 ‡ National team caps and goals as of 14 October 2024

Khaled Narey (born 23 July 1994) is a professional footballer who plays as a winger or full-back. Born in Germany, he represents the Togo national team.

== Early life ==
Narey was born in Neuwied, Rhineland-Palatinate, and grew up in Leverkusen.

== Club career ==
=== Early career ===
Narey played youth football for SV Bergfried Leverkusen-Steinbüchel from June 2003 to 30 June 2008. After moving to Bayer Leverkusen in 2010, he was promoted from their U19 team to the reserves ahead of the 2013–14 season, and developed into a regular player. He played there for a total of four years before moving to Borussia Dortmund. Narey joined Borussia Dortmund II in 2014 from Bayer Leverkusen. He made his professional debut in the 3. Liga on 26 July 2014 against Rot-Weiß Erfurt. and was even part of the squad for the black and yellow licensed team at the start of the Bundesliga this season. He was loaned to Paderborn, where he became a regular in league two in the second half of the season. Narey joined Greuther Fürth on 1 July 2016 on a three-year contract and played in 70 matches, scoring eight goals and providing seven assists.

=== Hamburger SV ===
For the 2018–19 season, Narey moved to Hamburger SV. He signed for the newly relegated 2. Bundesliga club, agreeing on a four-year contract. Under head coaches Christian Titz and Hannes Wolf, he established himself as a regular starter as a winger to finish with 32 league appearances (28 starts). With seven league goals, he was only behind Pierre-Michel Lasogga (13 goals), to become the second highest goalscorer of a HSV team, which missed out on direct promotion with a 4th-place finish. Despite being a key member of the team with 84 appearances, 11 goals and 9 assists, the fact that Hamburg was reaching the well but not drinking the water, coupled with the introversion in the team and the constant changes of coaches led him again to look for a new challenge in his career.

=== Fortuna Düsseldorf ===
In the summer of 2021, Narey signed a two-year contract with Fortuna Düsseldorf. He enjoyed a stellar season, as he scored 8 goals and provided 15 assists in 31 matches in Germany's 2. Bundesliga.

=== PAOK ===
After weeks of waiting and hard "bargaining", the Thessalonikians managed to reach an agreement with the German team for the acquisition of the 27-year-old German winger, with the "Double-headed eagle" paying around €1.5m plus €250k in bonuses and a 10% share in possible future transfer fees.

=== Saudi Arabia ===
On 28 August 2023, Narey joined Saudi Pro League club Al-Khaleej on a two-year deal.

On 20 January 2025, Narey joined Saudi Second Division club Al-Ula.

On 7 September 2025, Narey joined Saudi Pro League side Al-Okhdood.

== International career ==
Narey was born in Germany to Togolese parents He debuted with Togo in a 1–1 2026 FIFA World Cup qualification tie with Sudan on 16 November 2023.

== Career statistics ==
=== Club ===
As of match played 3 August 2023

Appearances and goals by club, season and competition
Club	Season	League			National cup (Note: Includes DFB-Pokal, Greek Football Cup)		Europe		Other		Total	
Club	Season	Division	Apps	Goals	Apps	Goals	Apps	Goals	Apps	Goals	Apps	Goal
Bayer 04 Leverkusen II	2013–14	Regionalliga West	36	8	—		—		—		36	8
Borussia Dortmund II	2014–15	3. Liga	34	1	—		—		—		34	1
SC Paderborn (loan)	2015–16	2. Bundesliga	13	1	—		—		4 (Note: Appearances in Oberliga Westfalen)	2	17	3
Greuther Fürth	2016–17	2. Bundesliga	31	2	3	0	—		—		34	2
Greuther Fürth	2017–18	2. Bundesliga	34	6	2	0	—		—		36	6
Greuther Fürth	Total		65	8	5	0	—		—		70	8
Hamburger SV	2018–19	2. Bundesliga	32	7	5	0	—		—		37	7
Hamburger SV	2019–20	2. Bundesliga	16	1	2	0	—		—		18	1
Hamburger SV	2020–21	2. Bundesliga	29	3	1	0	—		—		30	3
Hamburger SV	Total		77	11	8	0	—		—		85	11
Fortuna Düsseldorf	2021–22	2. Bundesliga	31	8	2	0	—		—		33	8
PAOK	2022–23	Super League Greece	27	7	6	1	2 (Note: Appearances in UEFA Europa Conference League)	0	—		35	8
PAOK	2023–24	Super League Greece	0	0	0	0	2	0	—		2	0
PAOK	Total		27	7	6	1	4	0	—		37	8
Career total			283	44	21	9	4	0	4	2	312	55

=== International ===
As of match played 14 October 2024

Appearances and goals by national team and year
National team	Year	Apps	Goals
Togo	2023	2	0
Togo	2024	6	1
Total		8	1

Scores and results list Togo's goal tally first, score column indicates score after each Narey goal.

List of international goals scored by Khaled Narey
No.	Date	Venue	Opponent	Score	Result	Competition
1	5 June 2024	Stade de Kégué, Lomé, Togo	South Sudan	1–0	1–1	2026 FIFA World Cup qualification

== Honours ==
Individual

- 2.Bundesliga top assist provider: 2021–22
- Super League Greece top assist provider: 2022–23
