= Matti Steinmann =

Finnish-German footballer

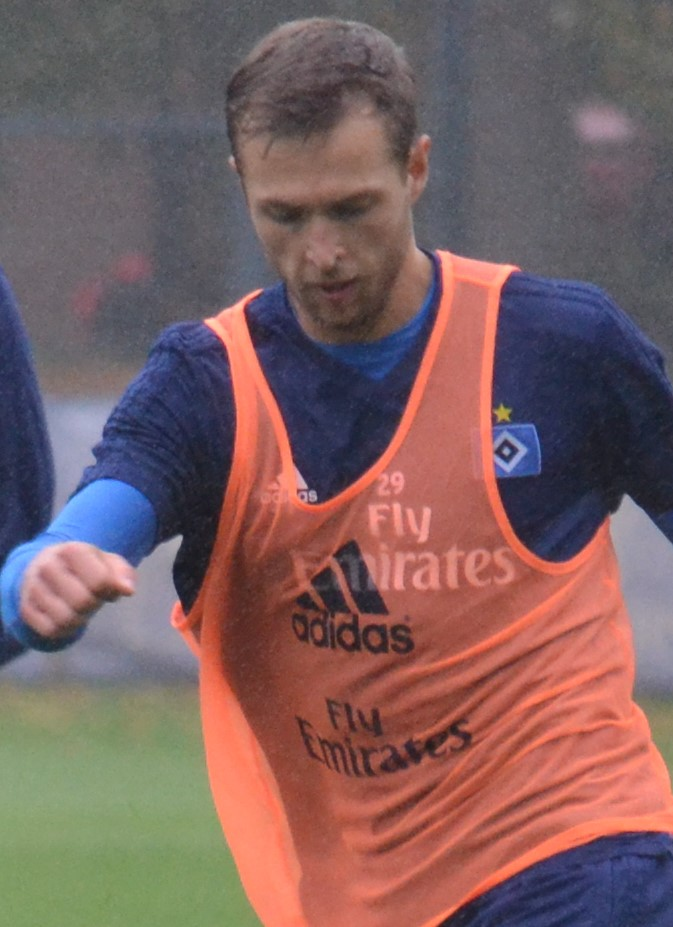
- Steinmann training with Hamburger SV in 2015

Personal information
- Full name: Ville Matti Steinmann
- Date of birth: 8 January 1995 (age 31)
- Place of birth: Hamburg, Germany
- Height: 1.88 m (6 ft 2 in)
- Position: Midfielder

Team information
- Current team: SV Drochtersen/Assel
- Number: 6

Youth career
- TSV Bargteheide
- 2007–2009: SV Preußen Reinfeld
- 2009–2014: Hamburger SV

Senior career*
Years	Team	Apps	(Gls)
2012–2015	Hamburger SV II	52	(5)
2014–2016	Hamburger SV	1	(0)
2015–2016	→ Chemnitzer FC (loan)	16	(1)
2016–2017	1. FSV Mainz 05 II	25	(2)
2017–2019	Hamburger SV II	24	(2)
2018–2019	Hamburger SV	11	(0)
2019	→ Vendsyssel FF (loan)	10	(1)
2019–2020	Wellington Phoenix	24	(0)
2020	Wellington Phoenix Reserves	1	(0)
2020–2021	East Bengal	17	(4)
2021–2022	Brisbane Roar	17	(0)
2023–	SV Drochtersen/Assel	91	(11)

International career
2010	Germany U15	1	(0)
2010–2011	Germany U16	10	(1)
2012	Germany U17	3	(0)
2015	Germany U20	5	(0)
- * Club domestic league appearances and goals as of 22 September 2026

Matti Steinmann (born 8 January 1995) is a German professional footballer who plays as a midfielder for SV Drochtersen/Assel in the Regionalliga Nord.

== Club career ==
=== Hamburger SV ===
Steinmann is a youth exponent from Hamburger SV. He made his Bundesliga debut at 20 September 2014 against Bayern Munich. He replaced Nicolai Müller after 87 minutes in a 0–0 home draw.

==== Loan to Vendsyssel FF ====
Steinmann was loaned out to Danish Superliga club Vendsyssel FF on 31 January 2019 for the rest of the season.

=== Wellington Phoenix ===
In August 2019, Steinmann joined A-League club Wellington Phoenix on a one-year contract.

=== East Bengal ===
On 18 September 2020, Steinmann joined Indian Super League club East Bengal. He scored his first goal on 26 December against Chennaiyin FC.

=== Brisbane Roar ===
In June 2021, Steinmann returned to Australia, signing with Brisbane Roar. In December 2022, he was released by the club after 17 appearances.

=== SV Drochtersen/Assel ===
On 21 June 2023, Steinmann signed a contract with SV Drochtersen/Assel in Regionalliga. He made a contract for the next two seasons.

== Personal life ==
Steinmann is of Finnish descent through his grandmother.

== Career statistics ==
=== Club ===
As of 29 June 2026

Appearances and goals by club, season and competition
Club	Season	League			National Cup		Other		Total	
Club	Season	Division	Apps	Goals	Apps	Goals	Apps	Goals	Apps	Goals
Hamburger SV II	2012–13	Regionalliga Nord	15	1	–		–		15	1
Hamburger SV II	2013–14	Regionalliga Nord	14	0	–		–		14	0
Hamburger SV II	2014–15	Regionalliga Nord	23	4	–		–		23	4
Hamburger SV II	Total		52	5	–		–		52	5
Hamburger SV	2013–14	Bundesliga	0	0	0	0	–		0	0
Hamburger SV	2014–15	Bundesliga	1	0	1 (Note: Appearance(s) in DFB-Pokal)	0	–		2	0
Hamburger SV	Total		1	0	1	0	0	0	2	0
Chemnitzer FC (loan)	2015–16	3. Liga	16	1	1	0	0	0	17	1
FSV Mainz 05 II	2016–17	3. Liga	25	2	–		–		25	2
Hamburger SV	2017–18	Bundesliga	8	0	0	0	–		8	0
Hamburger SV	2018–19	2. Bundesliga	3	0	0	0	–		3	0
Hamburger SV	Total		11	0	0	0	–		11	0
Hamburger SV II	2017–18	Regionalliga Nord	19	2	–		–		19	2
Hamburger SV II	2018–19	Regionalliga Nord	5	0	–		–		5	0
Hamburger SV II	2019–20	Regionalliga Nord	1	0	–		–		1	0
Hamburger SV II	Total		25	2	–		–		25	2
Vendsyssel FF (loan)	2018–19	Danish Superliga	10	1	0	0	–		10	1
Wellington Phoenix	2019–20	A-League	24	0	0	0	–		24	0
Wellington Phoenix Res.	2019–20	NZ Premiership	1	0	–		–		1	0
East Bengal	2020–21	Indian Super League	17	4	0	0	–		17	4
Brisbane Roar	2021–22	A-League	17	0	3 (Note: Appearance(s) in Australia Cup)	1	–		20	1
Brisbane Roar	2022–23	A-League	0	0	0	0	–		0	0
Brisbane Roar	Total		17	0	3	1	0	0	20	1
SV Drochtersen/Assel	2023–24	Regionalliga Nord	28	6	0	0	1 (Note: Includes Lower Saxony Cup)	0	29	6
SV Drochtersen/Assel	2024–25	Regionalliga Nord	30	2	0	0	1	0	31	2
SV Drochtersen/Assel	2025–26	Regionalliga Nord	27	3	0	0	4	0	31	3
Total		85	11	0	0	6	0	91	11	
Career total			284	26	5	1	6	0	295	27
