= Gideon Jung =

German footballer (born 1994)

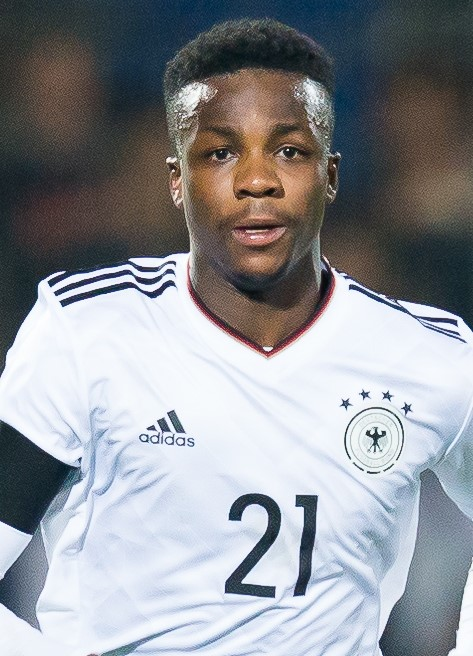
- Jung in 2017

Personal information
- Date of birth: 12 September 1994 (age 32)
- Place of birth: Düsseldorf, Germany
- Height: 1.89 m (6 ft 2 in)
- Position: Defensive midfielder

Team information
- Current team: Alemannia Aachen
- Number: 21

Youth career
- 2011–2012: Sportfreunde Baumberg
- 2012–2013: Rot-Weiß Oberhausen

Senior career*
| Years | Team | Apps | (Gls) |
| 2013–2014 | Rot-Weiß Oberhausen | 22 | (1) |
| 2014–2015 | Hamburger SV II | 29 | (2) |
| 2014–2021 | Hamburger SV | 133 | (2) |
| 2021–2025 | Greuther Fürth | 75 | (2) |
| 2021–2022 | Greuther Fürth II | 3 | (1) |
| 2025–2026 | Kayserispor | 4 | (0) |
| 2026– | Alemannia Aachen | 7 | (0) |

International career^{‡}
| 2017 | Germany U21 | 5 | (0) |
Medal record
UEFA European Under-21 Championship
| Winner | 2017 |
- * Club domestic league appearances and goals as of 29 August 2026 ‡ National team caps and goals as of 27 June 2017

Gideon Jung (born 12 September 1994) is a German professional footballer who plays as a defender or defensive midfielder for 3. Liga club Alemannia Aachen.

== Club career ==
He made his professional debut on 13 September 2013 for Rot-Weiß Oberhausen in a Regionalliga West match against Sportfreunde Lotte. On 5 April 2014, Jung scored his first professional goal in a game against SC Wiedenbrück 2000. He went on to make 22 appearances in the 2013-14 season before transferring to Hamburger SV on 1 July 2014.

Upon arrival at Hamburger SV, Jung was immediately sent down to the second team, Hamburger SV II. On 26 July 2014, Gideon made his debut for the side in a 4–0 rout of Goslarer SC 08. On 26 October 2014, Gideon scored 1 of 10 goals for the team during a 10–0 rout of FT Braunschweig. During the 2014–15 season, Gideon appeared 23 times for Hamburger SV II, but wasn't able to make his debut for Hamburger SV.

Having been called up to Hamburger SV, Jung started the 2015–16 on the first team, making his debut on Matchday 1 versus FC Bayern Munich.

In August 2025 the player moved to Central Anatolian side Kayserispor, signing a one year contract.

On 2 February 2026, Jung signed with Alemannia Aachen in 3. Liga.

== International career ==
On 21 August 2015, Jung was invited by Horst Hrubesch, coach of the German U-21 national team for the first time when he was nominated for the test match against Denmark and for the European Championship qualifier against Azerbaijan. He could not participate in the game due to a hit on the calf. On 26 August 2016, Jung was again invited by Stefan Kuntz, Hrubesch's successor. Again he could not participate because of an injury.

== Career statistics ==
As of 21 August 2021

Appearances and goals by club, season and competition
| Club | Season | League | | | DFB-Pokal | | Total | |
| Club | Season | Division | Apps | Goals | Apps | Goals | Apps | Goals |
|---|---|---|---|---|---|---|---|---|
| Rot-Weiß Oberhausen | 2013–14 | Regionalliga West | 22 | 1 | 0 | 0 | 22 | 1 |
| Hamburger SV II | 2014–15 | Regionalliga Nord | 23 | 2 | — | | 23 | 2 |
| Hamburger SV II | 2015–16 | Regionalliga Nord | 5 | 0 | — | | 5 | 0 |
| Hamburger SV II | 2016–17 | Regionalliga Nord | 1 | 0 | — | | 1 | 0 |
| Hamburger SV II | Total | | 29 | 2 | — | | 29 | 2 |
| Hamburger SV | 2015–16 | Bundesliga | 19 | 0 | 1 | 0 | 20 | 0 |
| Hamburger SV | 2016–17 | Bundesliga | 29 | 0 | 4 | 1 | 33 | 1 |
| Hamburger SV | 2017–18 | Bundesliga | 30 | 1 | 1 | 0 | 31 | 1 |
| Hamburger SV | 2018–19 | 2. Bundesliga | 12 | 0 | 2 | 0 | 14 | 0 |
| Hamburger SV | 2019–20 | 2. Bundesliga | 24 | 1 | 2 | 0 | 26 | 1 |
| Hamburger SV | 2020–21 | 2. Bundesliga | 19 | 0 | 0 | 0 | 19 | 0 |
| Hamburger SV | Total | | 133 | 2 | 10 | 1 | 143 | 3 |
| SpVgg Greuther Fürth | 2021–22 | Bundesliga | 1 | 0 | 1 | 0 | 2 | 0 |
| Career total | | | 185 | 5 | 11 | 1 | 196 | 6 |

== Honours ==
Germany

- UEFA European Under-21 Championship: 2017
