= Vasilije Janjičić =

Swiss footballer (born 1998)

Personal information
- Date of birth: 2 November 1998 (age 28)
- Place of birth: Zürich, Switzerland
- Height: 1.80 m (5 ft 11 in)
- Position: Midfielder

Youth career
- 2004–2016: Zürich

Senior career*
Years	Team	Apps	(Gls)
2016	Zürich	1	(0)
2016–2018	Hamburger SV II	27	(2)
2017–2019	Hamburger SV	33	(0)
2019–2022	Zürich	12	(0)
2021	Zürich II	13	(0)
2022–2023	Celje	25	(4)
2023–2026	Thun	70	(3)

International career
2012–2013	Switzerland U15	8	(6)
2013–2014	Switzerland U16	7	(2)
2014–2015	Switzerland U17	3	(0)
2016	Switzerland U18	1	(0)
2016–2017	Switzerland U19	4	(0)
2017–2018	Switzerland U20	8	(1)
2018–2019	Switzerland U21	7	(0)
- * Club domestic league appearances and goals as of 26 May 2026

Vasilije Janjičić (born 2 November 1998) is a Swiss professional footballer who plays as a midfielder.

== Club career ==
Janjičić came through the youth academy of FC Zürich. In August 2016 he signed a four-year deal with Hamburger SV, where he debuted in the Bundesliga on 4 April 2017 against Borussia Dortmund.

After the 2018–19 season, he was excluded from the first team by new coach Dieter Hecking. On 27 August 2019, he signed a three-year contract with his youth club FC Zürich and returned to Switzerland. He helped Thun win the 2024–25 Swiss Challenge League, and the following season their first ever first division title, the 2025–26 Swiss Super League.

== Personal life ==
Janjičić is of Serb origin. In February 2018, Janjičić caused a car crash in the Elbtunnel while driving under the influence of alcohol and without a valid driving licence. In July 2020, he was diagnosed with cancer.

== Honours ==
Thun

- Swiss Super League: 2025–26
- Swiss Challenge League: 2024–25
