= Julian Pollersbeck =

German footballer (born 1994)

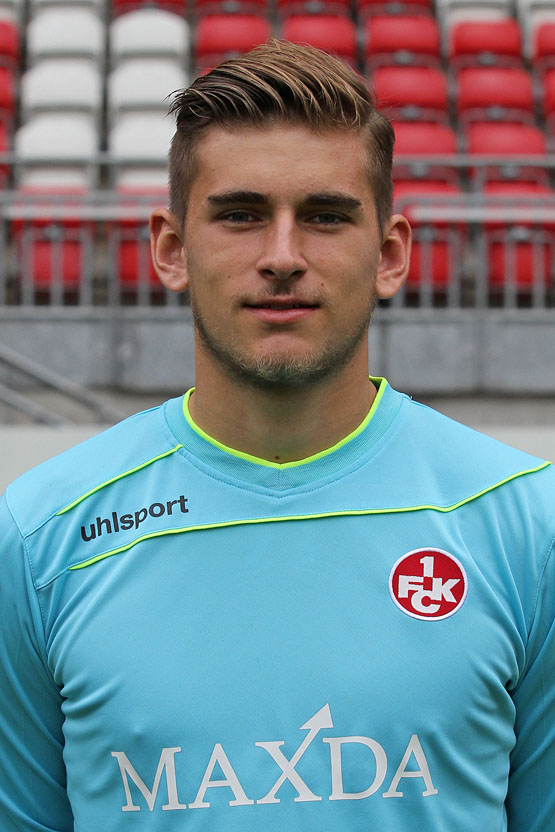
- Pollersbeck with 1. FC Kaiserslautern in 2015

Personal information
- Date of birth: 16 August 1994 (age 32)
- Place of birth: Altötting, Germany
- Height: 1.95 m (6 ft 5 in)
- Position: Goalkeeper

Youth career
- –2010: DJK Emmerting
- 2010–2011: Wacker Burghausen

Senior career*
Years	Team	Apps	(Gls)
2012–2013	Wacker Burghausen	0	(0)
2014–2017	1. FC Kaiserslautern	31	(0)
2017–2020	Hamburger SV	51	(0)
2020–2023	Lyon	6	(0)
2022–2023	Lyon B	1	(0)
2023	→ Lorient (loan)	0	(0)
2023–2024	1. FC Magdeburg	0	(0)
2024–2026	Jahn Regensburg	11	(0)

International career^{‡}
2016–2017	Germany U21	7	(0)
Medal record
UEFA European Under-21 Championship
Winner	2017
- * Club domestic league appearances and goals as of 19:40, 18 May 2026 (UTC) ‡ National team caps and goals as of 14:31, 22 July 2018 (UTC)

Julian Pollersbeck (born 16 August 1994) is a German professional footballer who last played as a goalkeeper for 3. Liga club Jahn Regensburg.

A prospect from the Wacker Burghausen academy, Pollersbeck made his breakthrough as part of the 1. FC Kaiserslautern team in the 2. Bundesliga. Ahead of the 2017–18 season, he moved to Bundesliga club Hamburger SV, but failed to convince during his time there, as the club suffered relegation from the league. In September 2020, he joined Lyon where he became the backup to Anthony Lopes.

Pollersbeck in a German youth international, having made seven appearances for the Germany under-21 team.

== Club career ==
=== Burghausen and Kaiserslautern ===
Pollersbeck grew up in Emmerting in Upper Bavaria and initially played at the local club DJK Emmerting as a youth player, before moving to Wacker Burghausen at the age of 16, the 3. Liga club, which at that time was by far the most successful club in his home district Altötting. From the 2011–12 season, he was included in the squad of the under-19 team in the second-tier Under-19 Bayern League and the second men's team in the sixth-tier Landesliga Bayern. In 2012–13 he played seven games in the Bayernliga for the recently promoted second team, and sat on the bench in three games for the first team in the 3. Liga. After the season, Pollersbeck moved to 1. FC Kaiserslautern. For the 2014–15 season he moved up to the first-team squad and received a professional contract in November 2014. The young goalkeeper made his professional debut in the 2. Bundesliga on 11 September 2016 in the 0–2 away defeat against SV Sandhausen after substituting for Stipe Vučur in the 74th minute, after regular goalkeeper André Weis had been sent-off. Pollersbeck also represented the team in the following games and stayed in goal even after Weis' return from suspension. Pollersbeck's contract with Kaiserslautern ran until 2020.

=== Hamburger SV ===
For the 2017–18 season, Pollersbeck moved to Bundesliga club Hamburger SV, where he signed a four-year contract. In the pre-season, Pollersbeck competed with Christian Mathenia for the starting spot in the HSV goal. During the test matches as part of the preparation for the season against Holstein Kiel and Sparta Rotterdam, Pollersbeck made mistakes, each of which led to goals conceded. Shortly before the start of the season, HSV coach Markus Gisdol finally decided on Mathenia as the starter. In order to gain match experience, Pollersbeck made his first appearance for the second team in the fourth-tier Regionalliga Nord on 2 October 2017. Due to poor form, Pollersbeck briefly lost his place as backup to regular third keeper Tom Mickel in November 2017. After the last game before winter break, Gisdol held an open competition for the number one spot again. After the winter preparations, Pollersbeck finally replaced Mathenia as the starter. He made his Bundesliga debut on 13 January 2018 in a 0–1 defeat in the away game against FC Augsburg. After the second game of the spring season, Pollersbeck lost his place to Mathenia under the new coach Bernd Hollerbach. After Christian Titz, the third coach of the season, had taken over the team, Pollersbeck became the starting goalkeeper again from matchday 27. He played 10 Bundesliga games in his first season as HSV suffered relegation to the 2. Bundesliga.

Also in the 2018–19 season, Pollersbeck kept his starting place under Titz and his successor Hannes Wolf and made 31 appearances in the league. Although he finished 12 games without conceding a goal, which was the second best value behind Rafał Gikiewicz from Union Berlin who had 14, he was rated the worst goalkeeper by kicker sports magazine among 16 goalkeepers rated. His training performance was also criticised. HSV finished in 4th place and missed out on promotion.

Before the 2019–20 season, a new goalkeeper was signed in Daniel Heuer Fernandes. Under new head coach Dieter Hecking, Pollersbeck was demoted to third goalkeeper behind Heuer Fernandes and Tom Mickel. He also had to give his shirt number 1 to Heuer Fernandes. Until the winter break, Pollersbeck was in the matchday squad for both league and a DFB-Pokal games. In addition, he played five times for the second team in the Regionalliga Nord. In early January, during the winter break, Pollersbeck tore a ligament in his left ankle during practice and was unable to attend the winter training camp. However, he returned to team practice at the beginning of February. After Heuer Fernandes was unable to convince in league games, Pollersbeck returned in goal on matchday 29 and played the last 6 league games. As in the previous year, HSV finished the season in 4th place and missed out on promotion.

=== Lyon ===
Pollersbeck joined Ligue 1 club Lyon in September 2020 on a four-year deal, for an initial fee of €250,000 that could rise to €300,000. After the departure of backup keeper Ciprian Tătărușanu to Milan, Pollersbeck became the new backup to starter Anthony Lopes. He did not make his debut with the French club until 6 March 2021, in a 5–2 victory against Sochaux in the Coupe de France.

On 31 January 2023, Pollersbeck joined fellow Ligue 1 club Lorient on loan until the end of the season. On 13 June 2023, Lyon announced that a mutual agreement had been reached with Pollersbeck to terminate his contract with the club upon his return from Lorient, making him a free agent on 1 July 2023.

=== 1. FC Magdeburg ===
On 15 June 2023, Pollersbeck signed a contract with 2. Bundesliga club 1. FC Magdeburg.

=== Jahn Regensburg ===
On 27 June 2024, Pollersbeck moved to 2. Bundesliga club Jahn Regensburg.

== International career ==
Pollersbeck made his Germany U21 debut in a 1–0 win over Turkey U21 on 10 November 2016.

== Career statistics ==
=== Club ===
As of 18 May 2026

Appearances and goals by club, season and competition
Club	Season	League			National Cup		Continental		Total	
Club	Season	Division	Apps	Goals	Apps	Goals	Apps	Goals	Apps	Goals
Wacker Burghausen	2012–13	3. Liga	0	0	—		—		0	0
1. FC Kaiserslautern II	2013–14	Regionalliga	10	0	—		—		10	0
1. FC Kaiserslautern II	2014–15	Regionalliga	19	0	—		—		19	0
1. FC Kaiserslautern II	2015–16	Regionalliga	16	0	—		—		16	0
1. FC Kaiserslautern II	2016–17	Regionalliga	2	0	—		—		2	0
1. FC Kaiserslautern II	Total		47	0	—		—		47	0
1. FC Kaiserslautern	2014–15	2. Bundesliga	0	0	0	0	—		0	0
1. FC Kaiserslautern	2015–16	2. Bundesliga	0	0	0	0	—		0	0
1. FC Kaiserslautern	2016–17	2. Bundesliga	31	0	0	0	—		31	0
1. FC Kaiserslautern	Total		31	0	0	0	—		31	0
Hamburger SV	2017–18	Bundesliga	10	0	0	0	—		10	0
Hamburger SV	2018–19	2. Bundesliga	31	0	4	0	—		35	0
Hamburger SV	2019–20	2. Bundesliga	6	0	0	0	—		6	0
Hamburger SV	Total		47	0	4	0	—		51	0
Hamburger SV II	2017–18	Regionalliga	1	0	—		—		1	0
Hamburger SV II	2019–20	Regionalliga	5	0	—		—		5	0
Hamburger SV II	Total		6	0	—		—		6	0
Lyon	2020–21	Ligue 1	0	0	3	0	—		3	0
Lyon	2021–22	Ligue 1	6	0	—		2 (Note: Appearance(s) in UEFA Europa League)	0	8	0
Lyon	Total		6	0	3	0	2	0	11	0
Lyon B	2021–22	Championnat National 2	1	0	—		—		1	0
Lorient (loan)	2022–23	Ligue 1	0	0	0	0	—		0	0
1. FC Magdeburg	2023–24	2. Bundesliga	0	0	0	0	—		0	0
Jahn Regensburg	2024–25	2. Bundesliga	10	0	—		—		10	0
Jahn Regensburg	2025–26	3. Liga	1	0	0	0	—		1	0
Jahn Regensburg	Total		11	0	0	0	—		11	0
Career Total			149	0	7	0	2	0	157	0

== Honours ==
Germany U21

- UEFA European Under-21 Championship: 2017

Individual

- UEFA European Under-21 Championship Team of the Tournament: 2017
