= Tobias Knost =

German association football player

Personal information
- Full name: Tobias-Mbunjiro Knost
- Date of birth: 8 May 2000 (age 26)
- Place of birth: Berlin, Germany
- Height: 1.78 m (5 ft 10 in)
- Position: Defender

Team information
- Current team: Bonner SC
- Number: 22

Youth career
- –2014: Tennis Borussia Berlin
- 2014–2018: Hamburger SV

Senior career*
Years	Team	Apps	(Gls)
2018–2021	Hamburger SV	0	(0)
2018–2021	Hamburger SV II	13	(0)
2021–2022	1. FC Magdeburg	14	(0)
2022–2026	SC Verl	50	(2)
2026–	Bonner SC	3	(0)

International career^{‡}
2017	Germany U18	2	(0)
- * Club domestic league appearances and goals as of 23 September 2026 ‡ National team caps and goals as of 20:37, 27 July 2021 (UTC)

Tobias-Mbunjiro Knost (born 8 May 2000) is a Kenyan professional footballer who plays as a defender for Regionalliga West club Bonner SC.

== Club career ==
Born in Berlin, Knost played youth football for Tennis Borussia Berlin before joining Hamburger SV in 2014. He signed a professional contract with the club in November 2017, and made his first-team debut for the club on 18 August 2018 in a 5–3 DFB-Pokal win over TuS Erndtebrück. He left the club in summer 2021, having failed to make another first-team appearance, whilst he did play for the reserve side 13 times during his spell at the club.

On 17 June 2021, it was announced that Knost had signed for 3. Liga club 1. FC Magdeburg, with the club not disclosing details on the contract.

On 6 June 2022, Knost moved to SC Verl.

== International career ==
Knost made 2 appearances for Germany at under-18 level in 2017.
