= Morten Behrens =

German footballer (born 1997)

Personal information
- Full name: Morten Jens Behrens
- Date of birth: 1 April 1997 (age 29)
- Place of birth: Bad Segeberg, Germany
- Height: 1.93 m (6 ft 4 in)
- Position: Goalkeeper

Team information
- Current team: SC Preußen Münster
- Number: 1

Youth career
- –2009: SV Schwarz-Weiß Westerrade
- 2009–2013: VfB Lübeck
- 2013–2016: Hamburger SV

Senior career*
Years	Team	Apps	(Gls)
2016–2019	Hamburger SV II	63	(0)
2018–2019	Hamburger SV	0	(0)
2019–2021	1. FC Magdeburg	67	(0)
2021–2024	Darmstadt 98	4	(0)
2022–2023	→ Waldhof Mannheim (loan)	18	(0)
2024–	SC Preußen Münster	5	(0)
- * Club domestic league appearances and goals as of 18 May 2026

Morten Jens Behrens (born 1 April 1997) is a German professional footballer who plays as a goalkeeper for 3. Liga club SC Preußen Münster.

== Career ==
Behrens made his professional debut for 1. FC Magdeburg in the first round of the 2019–20 DFB-Pokal on 10 August 2019, starting in the home match against Bundesliga club SC Freiburg.

On 20 June 2022, Behrens joined Waldhof Mannheim on loan.

On 12 May 2024, Darmstadt 98 announced that he and several other players will leave the club after this season.

On 18 June 2024, Behrens signed with SC Preußen Münster.

== Career statistics ==
As of match played 31 December 2025

Appearances and goals by club, season and competition
Club	Season	League			National cup		Other		Total	
Club	Season	Division	Apps	Goals	Apps	Goals	Apps	Goals	Apps	Goals
Hamburger SV II	2015–16	Regionalliga Nord	3	0	—		—		3	0
Hamburger SV II	2016–17	Regionalliga Nord	12	0	—		—		12	0
Hamburger SV II	2017–18	Regionalliga Nord	27	0	—		—		27	0
Hamburger SV II	2018–19	Regionalliga Nord	21	0	—		—		21	0
Hamburger SV II	Total		63	0	—		—		63	0
Hamburger SV	2018–19	2. Bundesliga	0	0	0	0	—		0	0
1. FC Magdeburg	2019–20	3. Liga	29	0	1	0	—		30	0
1. FC Magdeburg	2020–21	3. Liga	38	0	1	0	—		39	0
1. FC Magdeburg	Total		67	0	2	0	—		69	0
Darmstadt 98	2021–22	2. Bundesliga	4	0	0	0	—		7	0
Darmstadt 98	2023–24	Bundesliga	0	0	0	0	—		0	0
Darmstadt 98	Total		4	0	0	0	—		7	0
Waldhof Mannheim (loan)	2022–23	3. Liga	18	0	2	0	—		20	0
SC Preußen Münster	2024–25	2. Bundesliga	1	0	1	0	—		2	0
SC Preußen Münster	2025–26	2. Bundesliga	3	0	0	0	—		3	0
SC Preußen Münster	Total		4	0	1	0	—		5	0
Career total			156	0	5	0	0	0	161	0
