= Soner Uysal =

German footballer and manager (born 1977)

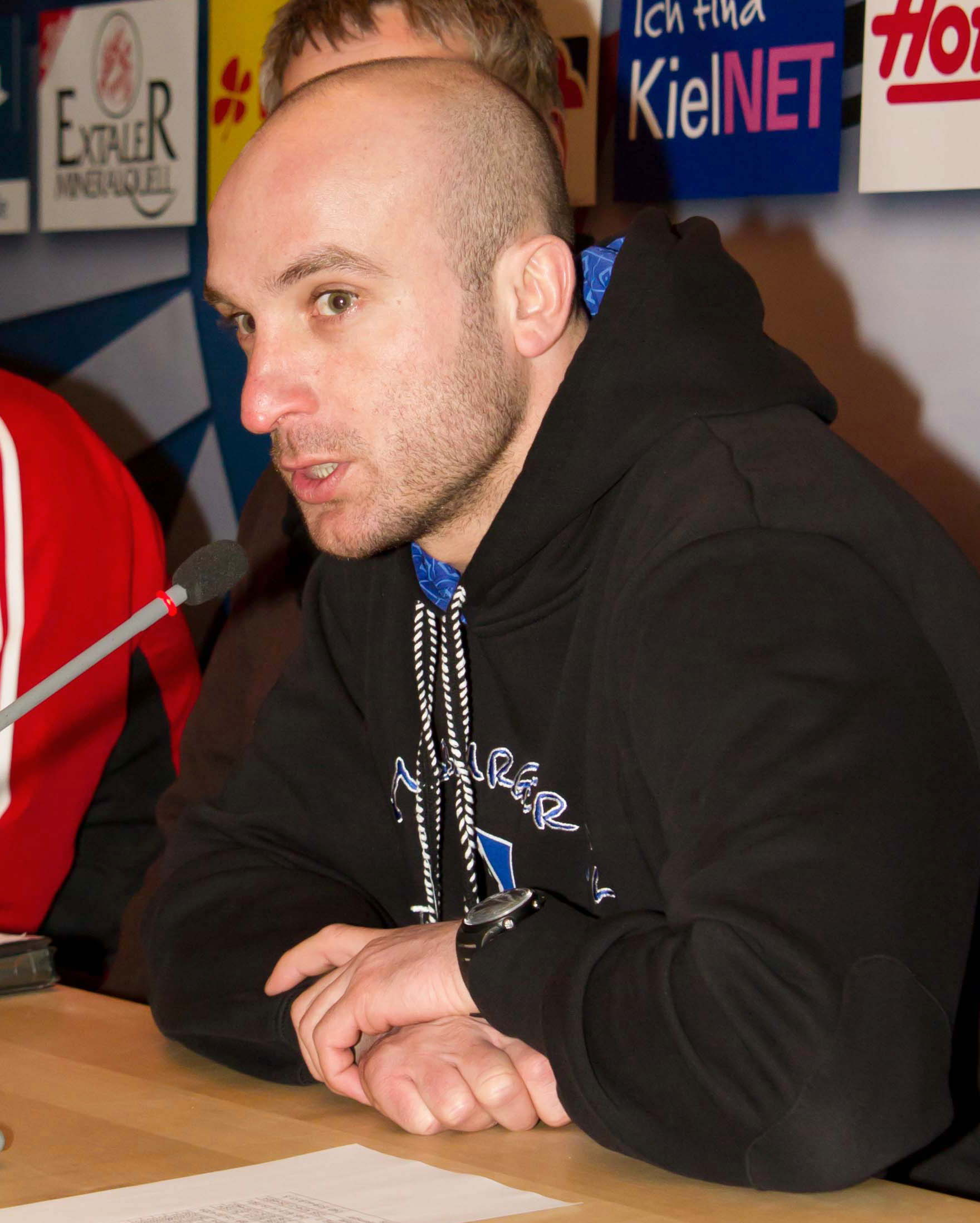

Personal information
- Date of birth: 24 August 1977 (age 49)
- Place of birth: Ludwigshafen, West Germany
- Height: 1.84 m (6 ft 0 in)
- Position: Forward

Team information
- Current team: Hamburger SV (assistant)

Youth career
- FG Mutterstadt
- Ludwigshafener SC

Senior career*
Years	Team	Apps	(Gls)
1996–1997	Waldhof Mannheim	17	(3)
1997	Hamburger SV	5	(0)
1998	FC Gütersloh	12	(0)
1998–1999	Hamburger SV II		
1999–2001	Hamburger SV	8	(1)
2001	Waldhof Mannheim	0	(0)
2004	Wedeler TSV		
2005	Örnek Türkspor Hamburg		

Managerial career
- 2005–2008: Hamburger SV (U19 assistant)
- 2008: Hamburger SV II (caretaker)
- 2009–2010: Hamburger SV (U19)
- 2010–2018: Hamburger SV II (assistant)
- 2011: Hamburger SV II (caretaker)
- 2011: Hamburger SV II (caretaker)
- 2013: Hamburger SV II (caretaker)
- 2015–2016: Hamburger SV II (caretaker)
- 2018–: Hamburger SV (assistant)
- * Club domestic league appearances and goals

Soner Uysal (born 24 August 1977) is a football coach and a former player. Born in Germany, he represented Turkey at youth international level.

He had to retire at just 24 years of age due to chronic knee injury. In March 2018, he became assistant coach at Hamburger SV.

== Honours ==
Hamburger SV

- Bundesliga: third place 1999–2000
