= Pierre-Michel Lasogga =

German footballer (born 1991)

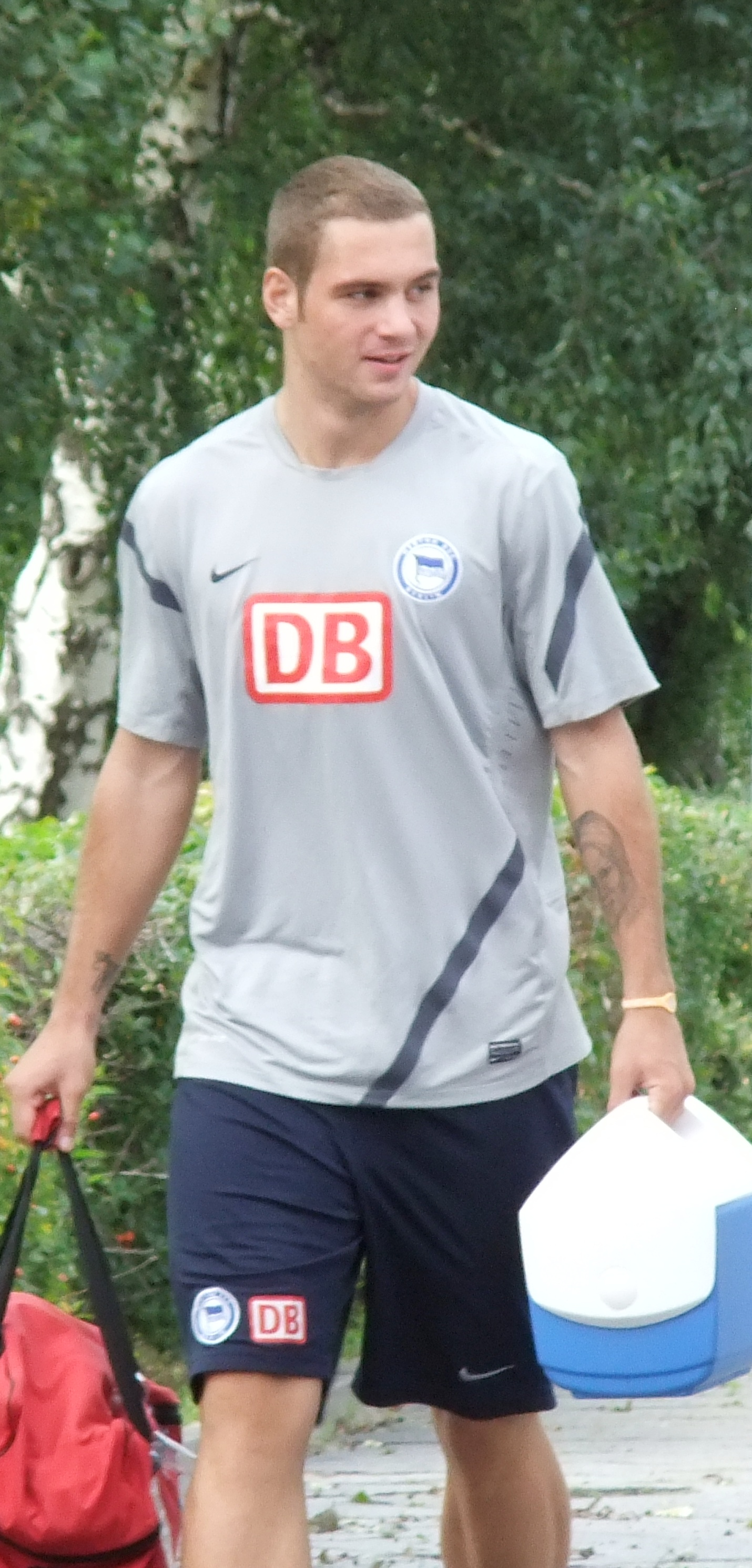
- Lasogga with Hertha BSC in 2011

Personal information
- Full name: Pierre-Michel Lasogga
- Birth name: Pierre-Michelle Lasogga
- Date of birth: 15 December 1991 (age 34)
- Place of birth: Gladbeck, Germany
- Height: 1.89 m (6 ft 2 in)
- Position: Forward

Youth career
- 1996–1999: 1. FC Gladbeck
- 1999–2006: Schalke 04
- 2006–2007: Rot-Weiss Essen
- 2007: SG Wattenscheid 09
- 2008–2009: VfL Wolfsburg
- 2009–2010: Bayer Leverkusen

Senior career*
Years	Team	Apps	(Gls)
2010	Bayer Leverkusen II	5	(0)
2010–2013	Hertha BSC II	6	(3)
2010–2014	Hertha BSC	64	(22)
2013–2014	→ Hamburger SV (loan)	20	(13)
2014–2019	Hamburger SV	103	(26)
2017–2018	→ Leeds United (loan)	31	(10)
2019–2020	Al-Arabi	21	(7)
2021–2022	Al-Khor	9	(3)
2023–2025	Schalke 04 II	28	(8)
2025	Schalke 04	1	(0)
Total		288	(92)

International career
2011–2013	Germany U21	11	(4)
- * Club domestic league appearances and goals

Pierre-Michel Lasogga (born 15 December 1991) is a German former professional footballer who played as a centre-forward.

He represented Germany U21s at international level, and was also called up to the German senior national team for a friendly against Chile in 2014.

== Club career ==
=== Early years ===
Pierre-Michel Lasogga grew up as the son of players consultant Kerstin Lasogga in Gladbeck near the stadium of Schalke 04 stadium in Gelsenkirchen; he also had a season ticket for FC Schalke 04. His stepfather is the former football goalkeeper Oliver Reck, who played for Schalke 04 between 1998 and 2003.

After playing for the youth teams of 1. FC Gladbeck, Schalke 04, Rot-Weiss Essen, SG Wattenscheid 09 and VfL Wolfsburg, Lasogga attracted the attention of Bundesliga club Bayer Leverkusen, who signed him in 2009. Lasogga quickly established himself in Leverkusen's youth team, making 25 appearances in the 2009–10 season. He scored 25 times in the U-19 Bundesliga West, making him the league's top goalscorer, and helped secure Leverkusen a spot in the national finals, which they lost 1–0 to Hansa Rostock. Towards the end of the season, Lasogga made his senior debut, making five appearances for Bayer Leverkusen's reserves in the Regionalliga West during the 2009–10 season.

=== First experiences in the Bundesliga ===
After just one season with Leverkusen, he left the club, and signed for 2. Bundesliga club Hertha BSC on a three-year contract.

Lasogga impressed during Hertha's preseason friendlies, scoring six goals, but injured himself just days before the opening fixture. After missing the first five league matches, Lasogga made his professional debut against Energie Cottbus on 24 September 2010. Three weeks later, Lasogga featured in Hertha's starting formation for the first time. He managed to take full advantage of the opportunity and scored twice. His success continued; after the winter break, he successfully replaced Rob Friend in Hertha's starting formation, starting all but three games ahead of the Canadian. At the end of the season, Hertha was promoted to the Bundesliga after one season in the second division. He finished the 2010–11 season with 13 goals in 25 league appearances, an appearance in the German Cup, and three goals in five appearances for Hertha BSC II in the Regionalliga Nord.

In the Bundesliga, Lasogga remained a key player for Hertha. He made his Bundesliga debut on the first matchday, and scoring for the first time two weeks later. By the winter break, Lasogga had started fourteen of Hertha's seventeen Bundesliga matches, and scored six times. He started all four matches after the break under Michael Skibbe. However, Skibbe's successor as manager, Otto Rehhagel relied on him less. At the end of his first Bundesliga season, Lasogga had played a total of 32 matches, including 23 starts, and scored eight times, making him Hertha's top goalscorer. On the final matchday, Lasogga sustained a severe injury, tearing his ACL, and was not expected to return to the pitch until early November. In the end, he did not make his comeback until the following calendar year, making a brief appearance at the end of Hertha's match against Jahn Regensburg on 3 February 2013.

He scored the only goal in the 1–0 win against SV Sandhausen on 21 April 2013, to ensure Hertha BSC's their direct promotion for the 2013–14 Bundesliga season. He finished the 2012–13 season with a goal in seven appearances and an appearance in the German Cup.

=== Hamburger SV ===
On 2 September 2013, Lasogga signed a one-year loan deal with Hamburger SV. He scored a hat-trick in only his second start for Hamburg, playing against Nuremberg on 6 October 2013. He scored 15 goals in the 24 matches for the 2013–14 season, including on 18 May 2014, Lasogga scored an away goal in the 1–1 draw against Greuther Fürth in the Bundesliga relegation playoff, the goal kept Hamburg in the division on away goals after a 0–0 draw in the first leg. After the end of the season, he signed a five-year contract with Hamburg on 4 July 2014. He scored four goals in 26 league appearances during the 2014–15 season.

He started the 2015–16 season with three goals in four league appearances including scoring two of three goals in a 3–0 win against Borussia Mönchengladbach. He finished the campaign with 8 goals in 30 appearances.

During the 2016–17 season he scored 2 goals in 22 appearances in all competitions for Hamburger SV, with him providing back up for regular Strikers Michael Gregoritsch and top scorer Bobby Wood. His only league goal of the season came on 13 May 2017, and proved to be crucial as he scored an injury time equaliser in the penultimate game of the season in a 1–1 draw with Schalke 04 which meant Hamburger SV went into the final game of the season with a chance of survival from relegation. Lasogga missed the final game due to injury when they beat relegation threatened rivals VfL Wolfsburg 2–1 on 20 May to consign Wolfsburg to the Relegation playoff position.

==== 2017–18 season: Loan to Leeds United ====
In August 2017, Lasogga joined English club Leeds United in a season long loan deal with Hamburg paying the majority of his wages for the duration of the loan. On 9 September he made his Leeds debut, scoring twice in a 5–0 win against Burton Albion.

After a spell out injured and then losing his place to Kemar Roofe, Lasogga started for Leeds on 20 January 2018 in a dramatic 3–4 loss against Millwall, with Lasogga scoring his 6th and 7th goals of the season in the match. Lasogga continued his scoring run when he scored his 10th goal of the season on 21 February in a 2–2 draw against Derby County to help earn new Head Coach Paul Heckingbottom his first point as Leeds Head Coach. Although he did not score again afterwards, Lasogga ended the season as Leeds' second best scorer in the league with ten goals, narrowly losing out to Kemar Roofe's eleven.

On 18 May 2018, Leeds announced Lasogga would be returning to his parent club upon the expiry of his loan. He scored 10 goals in 33 appearances.

=== Al-Arabi ===
In June 2019, Al-Arabi confirmed that Lasogga had signed a 3-year contract with the club.

=== Al-Khor ===
On 14 February 2021, Lasogga signed with Qatar Stars League side Al-Khor managed by compatriot Winfried Schäfer.

=== Schalke 04 II ===
After one year without a club, Lasogga signed with Schalke 04 II on 21 June 2023. He made his first team debut for Schalke 04 in the 2. Bundesliga in a 2–1 defeat against SV Elversberg on 18 May 2025, coming on as a substitute in the 70th minute. A month later he ended his career.

== International career ==
On 21 March 2011, Lasogga was first invited to the U-21 team of Germany when he was nominated for the friendly matches against the Netherlands and Italy. On 25 March 2011, he debuted in the starting line-up in the friendly against the Netherlands and scored the 1–0 lead. Lasogga was nominated on 16 May 2013 by former U-21 coach Rainer Adrion for the preliminary squad for the 2013 UEFA European Under-21 Football Championship, and on 28 May 2013 made it into the final squad. In the first group match against the Netherlands that Germany lost 2–3, Lasogga stood in the starting line-up and was substituted. The second group game against Spain on 12 June 2013 was his last appearance for the U-21 team. Germany lost the game 0–1 and was eliminated early. In the third group match against Russia, he and some other players were not used. After the tournament, Lasogga was no longer eligible to play because of his age.

On 28 February 2014, Lasogga was called up by manager Joachim Löw to Germany's senior national team for the friendly in the Mercedes-Benz Arena in Stuttgart against Chile. Due to an injury, Lasogga could not play.

== Personal life ==
Lasogga's stepfather is former Werder Bremen, Schalke and German international goalkeeper Oliver Reck.

Lasogga's mother Kerstin acts as his agent. He has a younger sister, Jenny, and two younger brothers, Gian-Luca and Etienne. Both play for Hertha BSC youth teams.

== Career statistics ==
Appearances and goals by club, season and competition
Club	Season	League			Cup		Other		Total	
Club	Season	Division	Apps	Goals	Apps	Goals	Apps	Goals	Apps	Goals
Bayer Leverkusen II	2009–10	Regionalliga West	5	0	—		—		5	0
Hertha BSC	2010–11	2. Bundesliga	25	13	1	0	—		26	13
Hertha BSC	2011–12	Bundesliga	32	8	4	2	—		36	10
Hertha BSC	2012–13	2. Bundesliga	7	1	0	0	—		7	1
Hertha BSC	Total		64	22	5	2	—		69	24
Hertha BSC II	2010–11	Regionalliga Nord	5	3	—		—		5	3
Hertha BSC II	2012–13	Regionalliga Nordost	1	0	—		—		1	0
Hertha BSC II	Total		6	3	—		—		6	3
Hamburger SV (loan)	2013–14	Bundesliga	20	13	2	1	2 (Note: Appearances in Bundesliga relegation play-offs)	1	24	15
Hamburger SV	2014–15	Bundesliga	26	4	2	1	2	0	30	5
Hamburger SV	2015–16	Bundesliga	30	8	1	0	—		31	8
Hamburger SV	2016–17	Bundesliga	20	1	2	1	—		22	2
Hamburger SV	2017–18	Bundesliga	0	0	0	0	—		0	0
Hamburger SV	2018–19	2. Bundesliga	27	13	4	6	—		31	19
Hamburger SV	Total		123	39	11	9	4	1	138	49
Leeds United (loan)	2017–18	EFL Championship	31	10	1	0	1 (Note: Appearance in League Cup)	0	33	10
Al-Arabi	2019–20	Qatar Stars League	20	7	2	3	4 (Note: Appearances in Qatari Stars Cup)	2	26	12
Al-Arabi	2020–21	Qatar Stars League	1	0	0	0	—		1	0
Al-Arabi	Total		21	7	2	3	4	2	27	12
Al-Khor	2020–21	Qatar Stars League	5	1	0	0	1 (Note: Appearance in Qatar Stars League relegation play-off)	0	6	1
Al-Khor	2021–22	Qatar Stars League	4	2	1	0	—		5	2
Al-Khor	Total		9	3	1	0	1	0	11	3
Schalke 04 II	2023–24	Regionalliga West	13	5	—		—		13	5
Schalke 04 II	2024–25	Regionalliga West	13	3	—		—		13	3
Schalke 04 II	2025–26	Regionalliga West	2	0	—		—		2	0
Schalke 04 II	Total		28	8	—		—		28	8
Schalke 04	2024–25	2. Bundesliga	1	0	—		—		1	0
Career total			288	92	20	14	10	3	318	109
