= Andreas Hirzel =

Swiss footballer (born 1993)

Personal information
- Date of birth: 25 March 1993 (age 33)
- Place of birth: Zürich, Switzerland
- Height: 1.90 m (6 ft 3 in)
- Position: Goalkeeper

Team information
- Current team: FC Aarau
- Number: 30

Youth career
- 2003–2004: FC Urdorf
- 2004–2010: FC Aarau

Senior career*
Years	Team	Apps	(Gls)
2010–2011	Team Aargau U21	8	(0)
2011–2012	→ SC Zofingen (loan)	30	(0)
2012–2014	FC Aarau	0	(0)
2012–2013	→ Grasshoppers II (loan)	15	(0)
2013	→ FC Baden (loan)	8	(0)
2013	→ FC Wangen bei Olten (loan)	2	(0)
2013–2014	→ FC Baden (loan)	6	(0)
2014–2015	FC Vaduz	1	(0)
2015–2018	Hamburger SV II	17	(0)
2015–2018	Hamburger SV	1	(0)
2018–2019	FC Vaduz	24	(0)
2019–2023	FC Thun	58	(0)
2023–	FC Aarau	9	(0)
- * Club domestic league appearances and goals as of 28 September 2026

Andreas Hirzel (born 25 March 1993) is a Swiss professional footballer who plays as a goalkeeper for FC Aarau.

== Career ==
Hirzel made his Bundesliga debut at 29 August 2015 against 1. FC Köln replacing René Adler after 40 minutes in a 2–1 away defeat.
