= Christian Titz =

German football manager (born 1971)

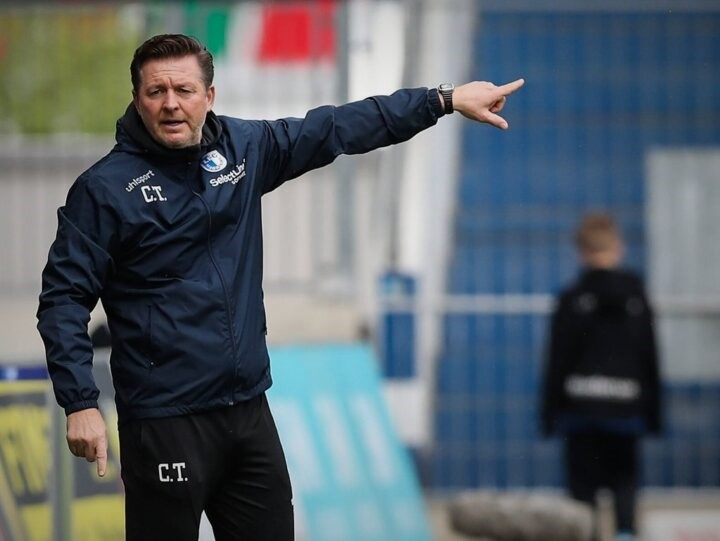
- Titz in 2021

Personal information
- Date of birth: 1 April 1971 (age 55)
- Place of birth: Mannheim, West Germany
- Position: Midfielder

Youth career
- FC Viktoria Neckarhausen
- SV Sandhausen

Senior career*
Years	Team	Apps	(Gls)
19??–1994	FC Viktoria Neckarhausen		
1994–1997	Waldhof Mannheim		
1997–1999	SG Egelsbach		
1999–2000	SC Idar-Oberstein		

Managerial career
- 2000–2004: Alemannia Aachen U19
- 2005–2006: 1. FC Passau
- 2009: Viktoria Köln
- 2011–2014: FC Homburg
- 2015–2017: Hamburger SV U17
- 2017–2018: Hamburger SV II
- 2018: Hamburger SV
- 2019–2020: Rot-Weiss Essen
- 2021–2025: 1. FC Magdeburg
- 2025–2026: Hannover 96
- * Club domestic league appearances and goals

Christian Titz (pronounced [ˈti:ts]; born 1 April 1971) is a German professional football manager and former player. Besides coaching, Titz has published several specialised books on football training methods.

During his active career, he most notably played for 2. Bundesliga for SV Waldhof Mannheim in the mid-1990s before ending his playing career in the Regionalliga for SC Idar-Oberstein in 2000. He then embarked on a coaching career, managing the youth teams of several clubs between 2000 and 2006 and again 2009, as well as amateur clubs while at the same time working for the United States Soccer Federation. From 2011 to 2014, Titz coached FC 08 Homburg in the Regionalliga Südwest before joining Hamburger SV in 2015, initially taking over the U17-team and later the reserve team. From 13 March 2018, he was head coach of the Hamburger SV first team before being dismissed on 23 September 2018. Prior to the 2019–20 season he joined Regionalliga club Rot-Weiss Essen but was dismissed after one season after failing to reach play-off promotions.

== Playing career ==
Titz started playing for local club FC Viktoria Neckarhausen, and later SV Sandhausen as a junior player. He began his senior career at his first club, Viktoria Neckarhausen, and would later go on to play for SG Egelsbach and SV Waldhof Mannheim before finishing his career at SC Idar-Oberstein, for whom he made six appearances during the 1999–2000 season in the third tier Regionalliga West/Südwest.

== Managerial career ==
=== Beginnings ===
Upon his retirement as an active player, Titz was appointed as coach of the Alemannia Aachen U19-team prior to the 2000–01 season. He worked as a coach in Aachen for four years, and acquired his professional coaching license in December 2004. In November 2005, he was appointed as head coach of fifth tier Bayernliga side 1. FC Passau, but could not save the club from relegation to the Landesliga Bayern and was sacked in August 2006. Titz then started a scouting network in Europe for the United States Soccer Federation.

For the 2000–01 season, Titz took over the first team as well as the U19 team of SCB Viktoria Köln, playing in the fifth tier Mittelrheinliga and the Under 19 Bundesliga, respectively. He was released from his duties at the end of December 2009.

Titz was then appointed as head coach of fifth tier Oberliga Rheinland-Pfalz/Saar team FC 08 Homburg ahead of the 2011–12 season, leading them to the division championship and promotion to the fourth tier Regionalliga. In the subsequent seasons, 2012–13 (14th) and 2013–14 (11th), he was able to establish the team in the division. In April 2014, Titz left the club.

=== Hamburger SV ===
Starting from the 2015–16 season, Titz was put in charge of the U17-side of Hamburger SV playing in the B-Junioren Bundesliga (Under 17 Bundesliga) for two seasons. For the 2017–18 season, he took over the fourth tier Regionalliga Nord reserve team, Hamburger SV II. Gaining 40 points from 17 games, the reserves became autumn Herbstmeister.

On 13 March 2018, Titz left the reserves after leading them to first place in the table with 45 points from 20 matches, and took over Bernd Hollerbach's first team, struggling in the bottom-end of the Bundesliga with seven points behind in the relegation battle. He initially signed a contract until the end of the 2017–18 season. After gaining ten points from seven games, HSV under Titz were able to reduce the gap to the relegation place before the last matchday to two points. Despite a win on the last match day, HSV suffered relegation from the Bundesliga for the first time in its history on 12 May 2018. Before the last matchday, him and the club had agreed on a contract extension, keeping him at the club independent of the team's ability to stay in the Bundesliga. Due to a positive change in performance, style of play, and the infusion of younger players such as Tatsuya Ito and Matti Steinmann, who had started the season in the reserves, Titz received praise.

On 16 May 2018, Titz signed a contract with HSV, keeping him at the club until 2020. The team would go on to lose their opening game 3–0 at home in the 2. Bundesliga matchup against Holstein Kiel. After four out of the next four matches, HSV were first in the league table. Afterwards, they lost 5–0 at home to SSV Jahn Regensburg, which tied their biggest home loss in club history (equalled 5–0 to Bayern Munich in 1974, to Saint-Étienne in 1980 and again to Bayern Munich in 2014). The following four games only resulted in one win and three goalless draws, including in the Hamburger Stadtderby against FC St. Pauli. On 23 October 2018, Titz was sacked, leaving the club at 5th place in the league table, two points behind first place. He was replaced by Hannes Wolf. Director of football Ralf Becker stated afterwards, that the HSV directors had come to the conclusion that the team went in the wrong direction with regards to development, which had meant an increased risk of missing the season goals.

=== Rot-Weiss Essen ===
Ahead of the 2019–20 season, Titz took over as head coach of fourth tier Regionalliga club Rot-Weiss Essen as the successor to Karsten Neitzel, who had been released from his duties after an 8th place finish in the previous season. Titz signed a contract keeping him at the club until 2021. Essen ended the season prematurely in June, after the Regionalliga was cancelled due to effects of the COVID-19 pandemic. They finished third in the table and thus missed the goal of participation in promotion play-offs for the 3. Liga; something club management had initially aimed for. As a result, the contract, which was still valid for one year, was terminated at the end of the season.

=== 1. FC Magdeburg ===
Titz was appointed as new head coach of 1. FC Magdeburg on 12 February 2021. Titz began with three defeats, but a streak of eleven unbeaten games, nine of which were victories, turned the team's fortunes around. This impressive run secured the team's position in the league on the penultimate matchday. In the 2021–22 season, the team continued its strong performance, emerging as an early favorite. From the seventh to the 38th matchday, Magdeburg held the top spot. By the 35th matchday, they had secured the championship and promotion to the 2. Bundesliga. The season concluded with 78 points, boasting a 14-point lead over second-placed Eintracht Braunschweig, with Titz winning the 3. Liga Manager of the Season.

In the 2022–23 season, the club finished 11th in the table, tallying 43 points. Titz achieved his 50th competitive win at the club with a resounding 4–0 victory against Arminia Bielefeld. Notably, his contract had been extended during the winter break when Magdeburg was positioned 17th in the table.

=== Hannover 96 ===
He was named the new head coach of Hannover 96 on 15 June 2025.

Titz was released from his duties on 14 September 2026 after losing three of the first five league matches in the 2026–27 season.

== Outside football ==
Titz is a trained administrative assistant and state-certified business economist. He is the owner of the service provider Coaching Zone, which was founded by Thomas Dooley under the name Dooley Soccer University and offers, among other things, individual training. Customers included Lewis Holtby and Christoph Moritz. Together with Dooley, Titz has published several specialised publication, focusing on several aspects of football.

== Managerial statistics ==
As of match played 11 September 2026

Managerial record by club and tenure
Team	From	To	Record				
Team	From	To	M	W	D	L	Win %
FC Homburg	1 July 2011	7 April 2014	97	44	22	31	45.36
Hamburger SV U17	1 July 2015	30 June 2017	52	29	7	16	55.77
Hamburger SV II	1 July 2017	12 March 2018	20	13	6	1	65.00
Hamburger SV	12 March 2018	23 October 2018	19	10	4	5	52.63
Rot-Weiss Essen	1 July 2019	30 June 2020	29	21	3	5	72.41
1. FC Magdeburg	12 February 2021	15 June 2025	165	75	38	52	45.45
Hannover 96	15 June 2025	14 September 2026	41	18	13	10	43.90
Total			423	210	93	120	49.65

== Bibliography ==
- Dooley, Thomas; Titz, Christian (2010). Fussball – das 4-4-2-System : [Laufwege erlernen, Angriff & Abwehr trainieren, Viererkette perfektionieren; exklusiv mit Animation]. Aachen: Meyer & Meyer. ISBN 978-3898996297.
- Dooley, Thomas; Titz, Christian (2010). Fussball - dribbeln und finten : [finten und Tricks lernen, jonglieren & dribbeln wie die Profis]. Aachen: Meyer & Meyer. ISBN 978-3898995580.
- Dooley, Thomas; Titz, Christian (2010). Fussball - Passen und Ballkontrolle. Aachen: Meyer & Meyer. ISBN 978-3-89899-557-3.
- Dooley, Thomas; Titz, Christian (2011). Fussball - perfekte Schusstechniken Techniken perfektionieren, optimale Ballannahme und -mitnahme, effizienter Torabschluss; exklusiv mit Animationen]. Aachen: Meyer & Meyer. ISBN 978-3898996891.
- Dooley, Thomas; Titz, Christian (2011). Fussball - Standardsituationen erfolgreich umsetzen : [Tricks und Varianten trainieren, Laufwege einüben, Timing perfektionieren; exklusiv mit Animationen]. Aachen: Meyer & Meyer. ISBN 978-3898996495.
- Dooley, Thomas; Titz, Christian (2012). Fußball - Zweikampfschulung [Einzel-, Gruppen- & Mannschaftstaktik; Defensiv- & Offensivtechniken; mehr als 40 Übungsvarianten]. Aachen: Meyer & Meyer. ISBN 978-3898996280.
- Dooley, Thomas; Titz, Christian (2015). Fußball - Torwarttraining [Abwehr mitgestalten, Spielaufbau fördern; Technik & Taktik erlernen; exklusiv mit Animationen]. Aachen: Meyer & Meyer. ISBN 978-3898997164.

== Honours ==
Individual

- 3. Liga Manager of the Season: 2021–22
