= Hamburger SV II =

- Full name: Hamburger Sport-Verein e. V.
- Founded: 29 September 1887 (club)
- Ground: Wolfgang-Meyer-Sportanlage
- Capacity: 8,400
- Chairman: Bernd Hoffmann
- Head coach: Lukas Anderer
- League: Regionalliga Nord (IV)
- 2025–26: Regionalliga Nord, 10th of 18
Home colours	Away colours	Third colours

Hamburger SV II are the reserve team of German association football club Hamburger SV. Until 2005 the team played as Hamburger SV Amateure.

The team has qualified for the first round of the DFB-Pokal, the German Cup, on five occasions. They currently play in the tier four Regionalliga Nord, in the fourth tier of the German football league system.

== History ==
The team first played in the highest football league in Hamburg when it won promotion to the tier two Amateurliga Hamburg in 1955. The team was relegated from the league again in 1959 but returned in 1961. With the introduction of the Bundesliga in 1963 and the Regionalliga as the second tier below it the Amateurliga dropped to the third tier and was renamed to Landesliga Hamburg. HSV Amateure earned a runner-up finish in the league in 1964 but otherwise remained an undistinguished side in the Landesliga, eventually suffering another relegation in 1972.

The team returned to what had now become the Verbandsliga Hamburg in 1979, initially continuing its trend of mid-table finishes but improving from 1984 onwards. It won three league championships in 1986, 1987 and 1989 but failed to win promotion to the Oberliga Nord in the first two attempts, eventually succeeding in the third. The team played in the Oberliga from 1989 to 1994 as a mid-table side and qualified for the new Regionalliga Nord in 1994 when the league was established.

The team played in the Regionalliga until 2000 when a sixteenth-place finish forced it down to the Oberliga Hamburg/Schleswig-Holstein for two seasons. A league title in the latter in 2002 allowed the club promotion back up to the Regionalliga Nord where it has been playing since, with a third-place finish in 2014–15 as its best result.

The team has also taken part in the DFB-Pokal on five occasions, courtesy to its Hamburger Pokal performance. On four occasions, in 1974–75, 1981–82, 1996–97 and 1997–98, the team was knocked out in the first round but in 1991–92 it advanced to the fourth round before losing 1–0 to Karlsruher SC.

== Honours ==
The team's honours:

- Oberliga Hamburg/Schleswig-Holstein
  - Champions: 2002
- Verbandsliga Hamburg
  - Champions: (3) 1986, 1987, 1989
- Hamburger Pokal
  - Winners: (3) 1991, 1996, 1997

== Recent seasons ==
The recent season-by-season performance of the club:

Year	Division	Tier	Position
1999–2000	Regionalliga Nord	III	16th↓
2000–01	Oberliga Hamburg/Schleswig-Holstein	IV	3rd
2001–02	Oberliga Hamburg/Schleswig-Holstein	IV	1st↑
2002–03	Regionalliga Nord	III	14th
2003–04	Regionalliga Nord	III	9th
2004–05	Regionalliga Nord	III	6th
2005–06	Regionalliga Nord	III	13th
2006–07	Regionalliga Nord	III	6th
2007–08	Regionalliga Nord	III	17th
2008–09	Regionalliga Nord	IV	13th
2009–10	Regionalliga Nord	IV	5th
2010–11	Regionalliga Nord	IV	8th
2011–12	Regionalliga Nord	IV	8th
2012–13	Regionalliga Nord	IV	14th
2013–14	Regionalliga Nord	IV	14th
2014–15	Regionalliga Nord	IV	3rd
2015–16	Regionalliga Nord	IV	14th
2016–17	Regionalliga Nord	IV	5th
2017–18	Regionalliga Nord	IV	2nd
2018-19	Regionalliga Nord	IV	7th
2019-20	Regionalliga Nord	IV	14th
2020-21	Regionalliga Nord	IV	5th
2021-22	Regionalliga Nord	IV	4th
2022-23	Regionalliga Nord	IV	2nd
2023-24	Regionalliga Nord	IV	7th
2024-25	Regionalliga Nord	IV	8th
2025-26	Regionalliga Nord	IV	10th

- With the introduction of the Regionalligas in 1994 and the 3. Liga in 2008 as the new third tier, below the 2. Bundesliga, all leagues below dropped one tier.

↑ Promoted	↓ Relegated

== Players ==
=== Current squad ===
As of 8 September 2026

Note: Flags indicate national team as defined under FIFA eligibility rules; some limited exceptions apply. Players may hold more than one non-FIFA nationality.

No.	Pos.	Nation	Player
1	GK	GER	Colin Poppelbaum
2	DF	DEN	Simon Kristiansen
3	DF	GER	Calvin Rahr
4	DF	GER	Noah Adekunle
5	DF	GER	Joel Agyekum
6	MF	GER	Henri Schümann
7	MF	GER	Arnaud Riedel
8	MF	GER	Davis Rath
9	FW	GER	Joonas Frenzel
10	MF	GER	Mads Bröcker
11	MF	GER	Kelvin Ojo

No.	Pos.	Nation	Player
12	GK	GER	Bennet Schmidt
14	MF	GER	Alessandro Puzzo
15	DF	GER	Sebastian Boltersdorf
16	FW	GER	Radin Amadou
17	DF	CRO	Dorian Migalić
19	DF	GER	Jason Bissi-Mouelle
20	DF	POR	Kilian Machado
21	MF	GER	Finn Barkowsky
23	MF	TUR	Mehmet Yıldırım
25	DF	GER	Jeremy Gandert

== Head coaches ==
- (Germany) Christian Titz (2017–2018)
- (Germany) Steffen Weiß (2018, interim)
- (Iran) Vahid Hashemian (2018, interim)
- (Germany) Achim Feifel (2018, interim)
- (Germany) Steffen Weiß (2018–2019)
- (Germany) Hannes Drews (2019–2020)
- (Germany) Pit Reimers (2020–2024)
- (Germany) Loïc Favé (2024)
- (Germany) Soner Uysal (2024–2025)
- (Germany) Lukas Anderer (2025–)
