= List of songs about Hamburg =

This list of songs about Hamburg is about songs dedicated to or involving the city, state and port of Hamburg, Germany.

Traditionally, Hamburg has been associated with a number of sea shanties, and Low German folk music and Schlager, added by Hamburger Schule rock and pop during the early 1980s, and alternative rock and hip hop during the early 1990s. Most notable recent musicians with work about the Hanseatic city are ECHO Award winners Udo Lindenberg, Fettes Brot and Revolverheld; international artists include Frank Boeijen, Keane, Édith Piaf and Tom Waits.

== List ==
Note: this list should exclude songs where Hamburg is simply name-checked (like in "London, Hamburg, Paris, Rome, [...]", lyrics of "All Over the World" by the Electric Light Orchestra) or barely mentioned in a few lines (like in "Every Fucking City" by Paul Kelly).

=== 18th century ===
- 1723: "Hamburger Ebb’ und Fluth" (water music) by Georg Philipp Telemann (baroque)
- 1723: "Hamburg Admiralty Music" by Georg Philipp Telemann (baroque)
- 1786: "Hamburg Sonata" (Sonata in G major, Wq 133) by Carl Philipp Emanuel Bach (baroque)

=== 19th century ===
- 1828: "Stadt Hamburg an der Elbe Auen" by Albert Methfessel (official Hamburg Anthem)
- 1850: "De Hamborger Veermaster" (shanty)
- 1870: "Rolling Home" (shanty)
- 1888: "Mondnacht auf der Alster" by Oscar Fetrás (waltz)

=== 20th century ===
==== 1910s ====
- 1912: "On the Reeperbahn at Half Past Midnight" by Ralph Arthur Roberts

==== 1940s ====
- 1941: "Under the Red Lantern of St. Pauli" by Lale Andersen
- 1944: "On the Reeperbahn at Half Past Midnight" by Hans Albers from picture Große Freiheit Nr. 7

==== 1950s ====
- 195?: "In Hamburg liegt ein Segelschiff im Hafen" by Die Travellers
- 1954: "On the Reeperbahn at Half Past Midnight" by Hans Albers from picture On the Reeperbahn at Half Past Midnight
- 1955: "C'est à Hambourg" by Édith Piaf
- 1957: "The Heart of St. Pauli" by Hans Albers from picture The Heart of St. Pauli
- 1958: "Das Mädchen aus Hamburg" by Hildegard Knef from picture La Fille de Hambourg

==== 1960s ====
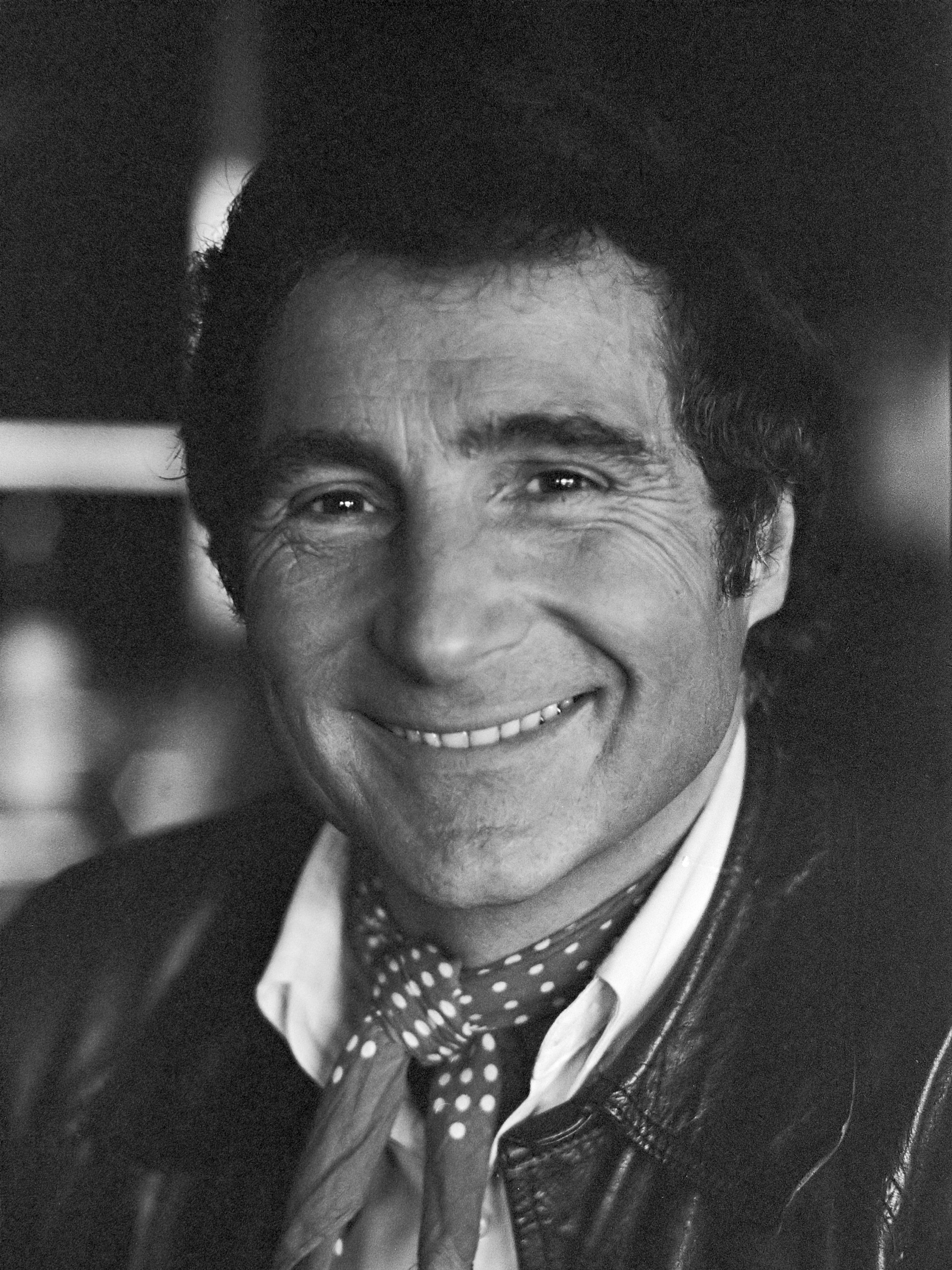
Freddy Quinn (1977)

- 1962: "Heimweh nach St. Pauli" by Freddy Quinn
- 1964: "In Hamburg when the Nights are long" by Lale Andersen
- 1966: "[Hamburg du schöne Stadt] Eh du mon Dieu, mon Dieu!" by Frank Wedekind

==== 1970s ====
- 1970: "In Hamburg sagt man Tschüss" by Heidi Kabel
- 1970: "Der Junge von St. Pauli" by Freddy Quinn
- 1971: "Hamburger Midnight" from the album Little Feat by Little Feat
- 1973: "Hamburg" by Freddy Quinn
- 1974: "Hamburg im Regen" by Mary Roos
- 1975: "Action Strasse" from the album Tomorrow Belongs to Me by The Sensational Alex Harvey Band (rock)
- 1975: "Kitsch" from the album Kitsch by Randy Pie
- 197?: "An de Eck steit'n Jung mit'n Tüdelband" by Heidi Kabel
- 1978: "Reeperbahn" by Udo Lindenberg
- 1979: "Zwischen Hamburg und München" from the album Etwas von mir by Roland Kaiser (schlager)

==== 1980s ====
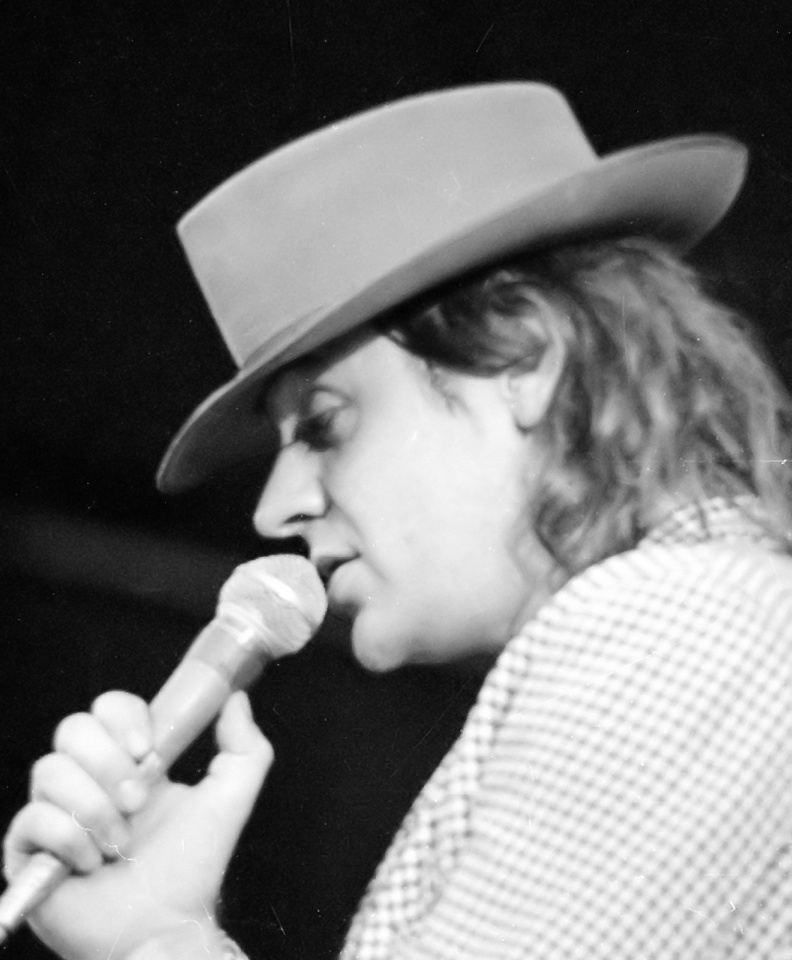
Udo Lindenberg (1987)

- 1980: "Der wilde wilde Westen [fängt gleich hinter Hamburg an]" by Truck Stop
- 1981: "Ich mag" by Volker Lechtenbrink
- 1981: various songs from the album Otto versaut Hamburg by Otto Waalkes
- 1981: "Low Life" by The Police
- 1984: "Große Freiheit Nr. 7" by Freddy Quinn
- 1985: "Hamburg um vier" from the album Dein ist mein ganzes Herz by Heinz Rudolf Kunze
- 1986: "Hamburg-City" by Freddy Quinn
- 1987: "Unten am Hafen" by Die Antwort (Bernd Begemann)
- 1987: "Winter in Hamburg" by Frank Boeijen
- 1989: "In Hamburg, da bin ich zu Haus" by Freddy Quinn
- 1989: "Hammonia – Mein Hamburg, ich liebe dich" by Heidi Kabel feat. Freddy Quinn

==== 1990s ====
- 1990: "Das gibt's nur auf der Reeperbahn bei Nacht" by Heidi Kabel feat. Freddy Quinn
- 1992: "Hamburg" by Lassie Singers
- 1992: "Take Me to Hamburg" from the bootleg album The American Landscape by Marc Cohn
- 1993: "Caught up the Reeperbahn!" from the album Absurd-Ditties by the Toy Dolls
- 1995: "Nordisch By Nature" by Fettes Brot
- 1995: "Hamburg rockt" from the album Digital ist besser by Tocotronic
- 1996: "Oh, St. Pauli" from the album Jetzt bist Du in Talkshows by Bernd Begemann
- 1996: "Hamburg, 8°, Regen" by Rantanplan
- 1997: "Nach Bahrenfeld im Bus" from the album Es ist egal, aber by Tocotronic
- 1999: "My German Fräulein" from the album Hungry Sally & Other Killer Lullabies by Tito & Tarantula
- 1999: "Hamburg Concerto" by György Ligeti

=== 21st century ===
==== 2000s ====
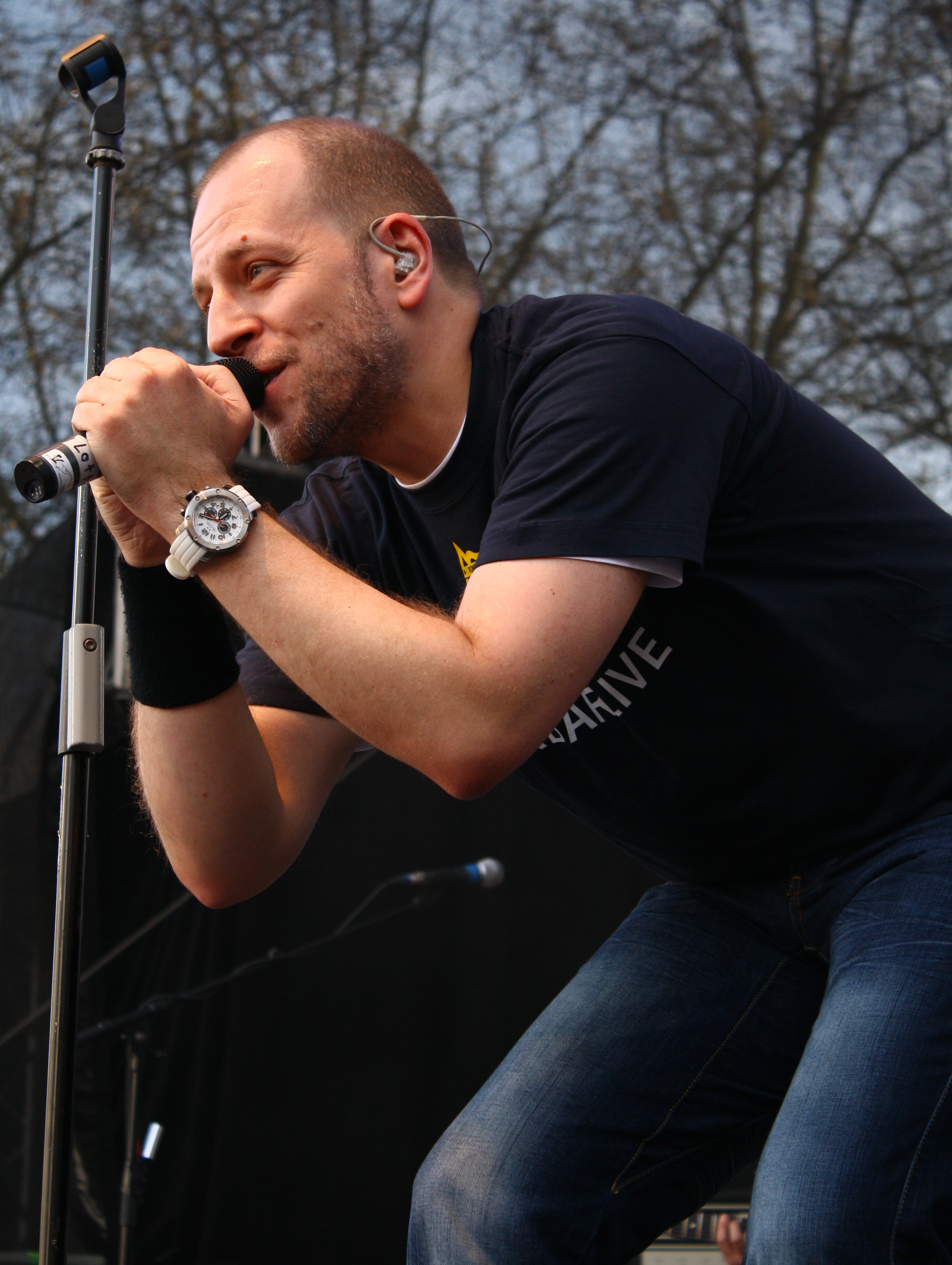
Lotto King Karl performing at a Radio Hamburg concert (2009)

- 2001: "Hamburg" from the album Foresights by Beat Crusaders
- 2002: "Reeperbahn" from the album Alice by Tom Waits
- 2002: "Wenn dir St. Pauli auf den Geist fällt" by Die Sterne
- 2003: "Landungsbrücken raus" by Kettcar
- 2003: "City Blues" from the album Blast Action Heroes by Beginner
- 2003: "Mein Hamburg lieb ich sehr" by Abschlach!
- 2005: "Hamburg '75" by Element of Crime
- 2006: "Hamburg Song" from the album Under the Iron Sea by Keane
- 2007: "St Pauli" from the album It's a Bit Complicated by Art Brut
- 2008: "Wie sieht's aus in Hamburg?" from the album Heureka by Tomte
- 2008: "Hamburg Calling" by Fettes Brot
- 2009: "Hamburg 2009" from the album Der letzte Tanz by Samy Deluxe
- 2009: "Chasing Hamburg" from the album Chasing Hamburg by Polar Bear Club

==== 2010s ====
- 2010: "Hamburg Hotel" from the album Barking by Underworld (electronic)
- 2010: "Hamburg hinter uns" from the album In Farbe by Revolverheld
- 2011: "Reeperbahn" from the album I Love You Dude by Digitalism (electronic)
- 2012: "Reeperbahn 2011" by Udo Lindenberg feat. Jan Delay
- 2013: "Hamburg Song" from the album Someone New by Chanticleer
- 2015: "Reeperbahn" from the album "Moth Boys" by Spector
- 2016: "Ahnma" from the album Advanced Chemistry by Beginner
- 2016: "Hamburg Drunk" from the album The Devil, The Heart and The Fight by Skinny Lister
- 2018: "Hotel St. Pauli" from the album Things you leave behind by Rebekka Bakken
