= On the Reeperbahn at Half Past Midnight =

On the Reeperbahn at Half Past Midnight (German:Auf der Reeperbahn nachts um halb eins) may refer to:

- "On the Reeperbahn at Half Past Midnight" (song)
- On the Reeperbahn at Half Past Midnight (1929 film)
- On the Reeperbahn at Half Past Midnight (1954 film)
- On the Reeperbahn at Half Past Midnight (1969 film)
