= Merlin Polzin =

German football manager

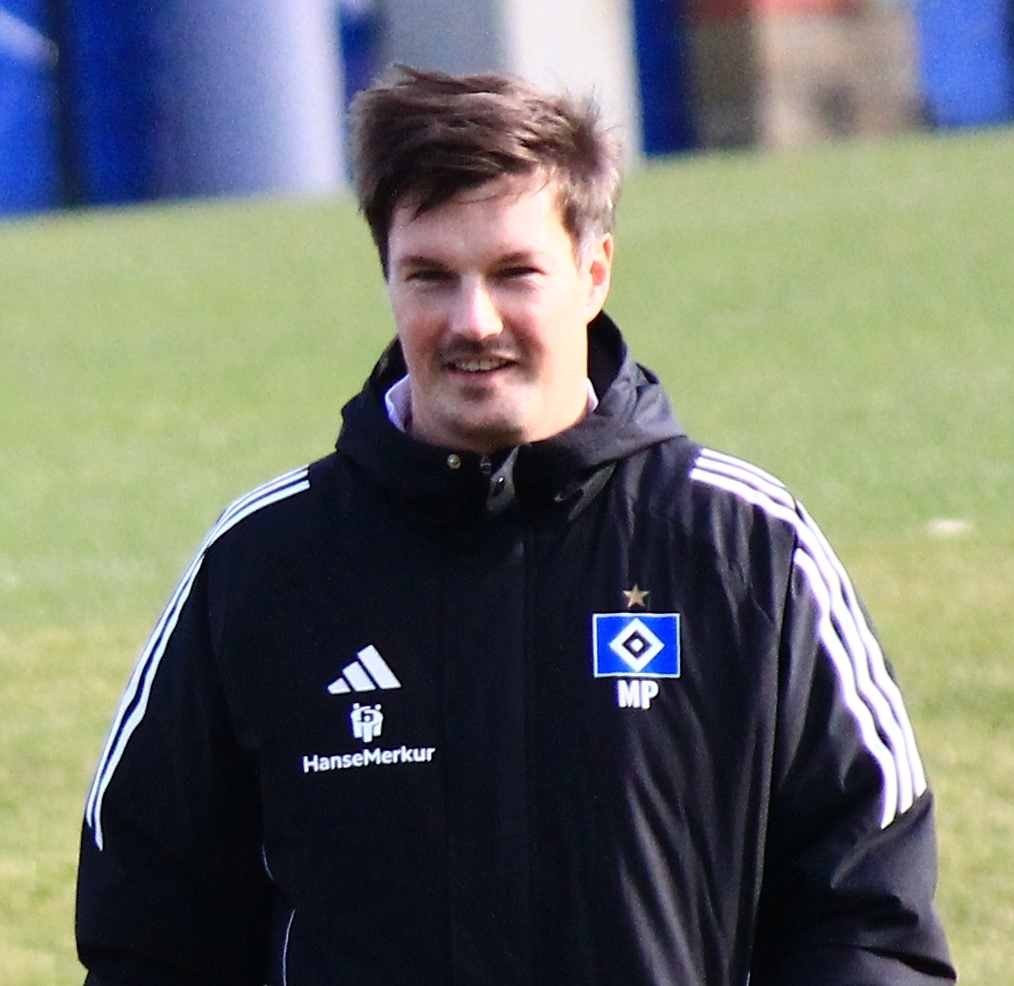
- Polzin as manager of Hamburger SV in 2025

Personal information
- Date of birth: November 7, 1990 (age 36)
- Place of birth: Hamburg, Germany

Team information
- Current team: Hamburger SV (manager)

Senior career*
Years	Team	Apps	(Gls)
- Bramfelder SV

Managerial career
- 2024: Hamburger SV (interim)
- 2024–: Hamburger SV
- * Club domestic league appearances and goals

Merlin Polzin (born 7 November 1990) is a German football manager who is currently in charge of Bundesliga club Hamburger SV.

== Managerial career ==
Merlin Polzin was born in Hamburg and grew up in Bramfeld, Hamburg-Wandsbek. He had played football at local club Bramfelder SV since his childhood and was promoted to the first team in 2009, in which he played in the sixth and fifth division. Polzin retired in 2011.

In the same year, he joined the youth academy of Hamburger SV and was an assistant coach there. Later, Polzin moved to Osnabrück to go to the Universität Osnabrück to graduate as a teacher for German and sports.

When Daniel Thioune was appointed head coach of the first team of VfL Osnabrück in the 3. Liga, Polzin became his assistant manager. The club from Osnabrück was promoted to 2. Bundesliga in 2018–19 season and secured the stay in the league in 2019–20 season. Afterwards, Thioune was appointed new manager of Hamburger SV and Polzin returned to his former club as assistant manager. Before the end of the 2020–21 season Thioune was sacked, but Polzin remained in the coaching staff at the club and was also the assistant of the new manager Tim Walter.

Tim Walter was sacked in February 2024 and Polzin was inserted as caretaker in the 2–2 draw against Hansa Rostock. After the appointing of Steffen Baumgart, he again became the assistant manager of HSV. In November 2024, he took over the caretake role again.

On 22 December 2024, after a 5–0 victory over Greuther Fürth on the previous day, he was promoted to main manager of the club, after reaching eight points out of four matches played.

== Managerial statistics ==
As of 22 November 2026

Managerial record by team and tenure
Team	From	To	Record							
Team	From	To	G	W	D	L	GF	GA	GD	Win %
Hamburger SV (interim)	12 February 2024	19 February 2024	1	0	1	0	2	2	+0	0.00
Hamburger SV	25 November 2024	present	70	27	18	25	108	108	+0	38.57
Total			71	27	19	25	110	110	+0	38.03
