= Hamburger SV =

Sports club in Hamburg, Germany

- Full name: Hamburger Sport-Verein e.V.
- Nickname: Die Rothosen (The Red Shorts)
- Short name: HSV
- Founded: 29 September 1887; 139 years ago (as SC Germania); 2 June 1919; 107 years ago (as Hamburger SV)
- Stadium: Volksparkstadion
- Capacity: 57,000
- President: Henrik Köncke
- Sporting director: Kathleen Krüger
- Head coach: Merlin Polzin
- League: Bundesliga
- 2025–26: Bundesliga, 13th of 18
- Website: hsv.de
Home colours	Away colours	Third colours

Hamburger Sport-Verein e.V. (German: [ˈhambʊʁɡɐ ˈʃpɔʁtfɛɐ̯ˌʔaɪ̯n]), commonly known as Hamburger SV (pronounced [ˈhambʊʁɡɐ ʔɛsˈfaʊ]) or Hamburg (pronounced [ˈhambʊʁk]), or HSV (pronounced [ˌhaːʔɛsˈfaʊ]), is a German sports club based in Hamburg, with its largest branch being its football department, which plays in the Bundesliga, the top tier of the German football league system. Though the current HSV was founded in June 1919 from a merger of three earlier clubs, it traces its origins to 29 September 1887 when the first of the predecessors, SC Germania, was founded.

HSV has won the German national championship six times, the DFB-Pokal three times and the former League Cup twice. The team's most successful period was from the mid-1970s until the mid-1980s when, in addition to several domestic honours, they won the 1976–77 European Cup Winners' Cup and the 1982–83 European Cup. The outstanding players of this period were Horst Hrubesch, Manfred Kaltz, and Felix Magath, all regulars in the West German national team. To date, HSV's last major trophy was the 1986–87 DFB-Pokal. Up until the 2017–18 Bundesliga season, which found the team relegated for the first time in history, HSV's football team had the distinction of being the only team that had played continuously in the top tier of the German football league system since the founding of the club at the end of World War I. It was subsequently the only team that had played in every season of the Bundesliga since its foundation in 1963.

HSV play their home games at the Volksparkstadion in Bahrenfeld, a western district of Hamburg. The club colours are officially blue, white and black but the home kit of the team is white jerseys and red shorts. The team's most common nickname is "die Rothosen" (the Red Shorts). As it is one of Germany's oldest clubs, it is also known as der Dinosaurier (the Dinosaur). HSV have rivalries with Werder Bremen, with whom they contest the Nordderby, and Hamburg-based FC St. Pauli, with whom they contest the Hamburg derby.

HSV is notable in football as a grassroots-oriented organisation which places strong emphasis on youth development. The club had a team in the Women's Bundesliga from 2003 to 2012 but it was demoted to Regionalliga level because of financial problems. Other club sections include badminton, baseball, basketball, bowling, boxing, cricket, darts, ice hockey, field hockey, golf, gymnastics, handball, and cardiopulmonary rehabilitation exercises. These sections represent about 10% of the club membership. HSV is one of the biggest sports clubs in Germany with over 84,000 members total in all its sections, and according to Forbes it is among the 20 largest football clubs in the world.

== History ==
=== Early years ===
Hamburger Sport-Verein (HSV) traces its origin to the merger of Der Hohenfelder Sportclub and Wandsbek-Marienthaler Sportclub on 29 September 1887 to form Sport-Club Germania Hamburg, usually referred to as SC Germania. This was the first of three clubs that merged on 2 June 1919 to create HSV in its present form. HSV in its club statute recognises the founding of SC Germania as its own date of origin. The other two clubs in the June 1919 merger were Hamburger FC founded in 1888 and FC Falke Eppendorf dating back to 1906. The merger came about because the three clubs had been severely weakened by the impact of the First World War on manpower and finance, and they could not continue as separate entities.

SC Germania was formed originally as an athletics club, and did not begin to play football until 1891, when some Englishmen joined the club and introduced it. SC Germania had its first success in 1896, winning the Hamburg-Altona championship for the first of five times. Germania player Hans Nobiling emigrated to Brazil at the end of the 19th century, in the foundation of SC Internacional, the third oldest club of the country which became part of São Paulo FC, one of the major sports clubs of Brazil, in 1938 and SC Germânia of São Paulo, which later became EC Pinheiros.

Hamburger SC 1888 was founded by students on 1 June 1888. It later had links with a youth team called FC Viktoria 95 and, during World War I, was temporarily known as Viktoria Hamburg 88. SC Germania and Hamburger SC 1888 were among 86 clubs who founded the Deutscher Fußball-Bund (DFB; German Football Association) in Leipzig on 28 January 1900. FC Falke was founded by students in Eppendorf on 5 March 1906, but it was never a successful team and played in lower leagues.

The newly formed Hamburger SV contested in the 1922 national final against 1. FC Nürnberg, who were playing for their third consecutive title. The game was called off on account of darkness after three hours and ten minutes of play, drawn at 2–2. The re-match also went into extra time, and in an era that did not allow for substitutions, that game was called off at 2–2 when Nuremberg were reduced to just seven players (two were injured, two had been sent off) and the referee ruled they could not continue. Considerable wrangling ensued over the decision. The DFB awarded the win to HSV, but urged them to refuse the title in the name of good sportsmanship (which they grudgingly did). Ultimately, the Viktoria trophy was not officially presented that year.

HSV's first success was achieved in the 1923 German football championship, when they won the national title against Union Oberschöneweide. They lost the title in 1924, losing the final to Nuremberg. They lifted the Viktoria again in 1928, when they defeated Hertha BSC 5–2 at the Altonaer Stadion in the final.

During the Third Reich, HSV had local success in the Gauliga Nordmark, also known as the Gauliga Hamburg, winning the league championship in 1937, 1938, 1939, 1941 and 1945. At national level the club was unsuccessful, with semi-final losses in 1938 and 1939 their best performances in this period. Its main rival in the Gauliga in those years was Eimsbütteler TV.

=== Post-war era ===
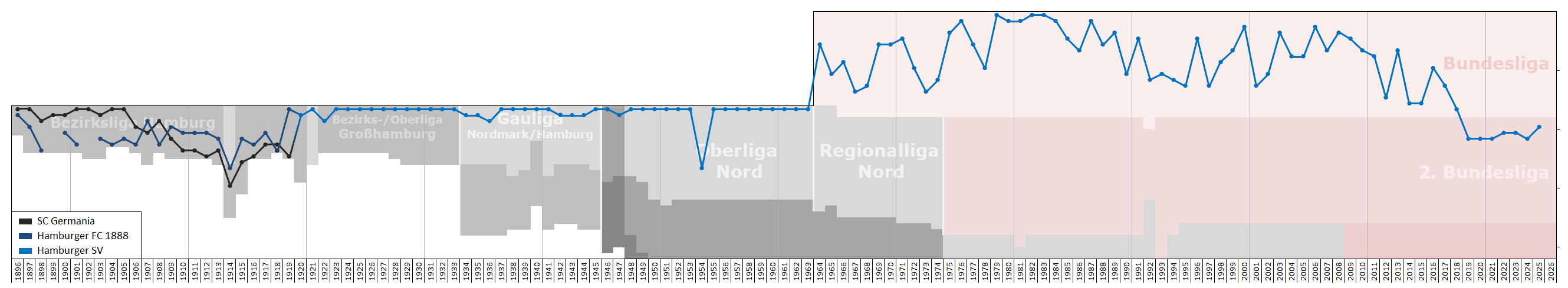
Historical chart of Hamburger SV league performance

HSV's first post-war season was in the newly formed Stadtliga Hamburg, and they won its championship in 1946. The club also won the championship of the British occupation zone in 1947 and 1948, the only two seasons this competition was staged.

In May 1950, HSV became the first German team to tour the United States after World War II, and came away with a 6–0 record.

Playing in the Oberliga Nord after the resumption of league play in post-war West Germany in 1947, HSV became a dominant regional club. In 16 seasons from 1947 to 1948 to 1962–63, they won the Oberliga title 15 times, only posting an 11th-place finish in 1953–54. During this period, they scored over 100 goals in each of the 1951, 1955, 1961 and 1962 seasons. In 1953, the club's all-time leading goalscorer Uwe Seeler debuted. In nine seasons, he scored 267 goals in 237 Oberliga matches.

In 1956, HSV reached the DFB-Pokal final, but were beaten by Karlsruher SC. This was followed by losses in the finals of the national championship to Borussia Dortmund, in 1957, and Schalke 04, in 1958.

In 1960, HSV became German champions for the first time since 1928, defeating 1. FC Köln 3–2 in the championship final. Seeler, who scored twice in the final, was named West German Footballer of the Year.

As national champions, HSV represented West Germany in the 1960–61 European Cup. The club's first ever match in European competition was a 5–0 defeat of Swiss club Young Boys in Bern, with HSV winning the tie 8–3 on aggregate. In the quarter-finals, they beat English champions Burnley before being defeated by Barcelona at the semi-final stage in a playoff game after the scores were level over two legs. The crowd of 77,600 at the Volksparkstadion for the first leg against Barcelona remains the record attendance for a HSV home match.

=== Entry into the Bundesliga ===
Germany's first professional football league, the Bundesliga, was formed, with HSV one of 16 clubs invited to join that first season. Hamburger SV was the only original Bundesliga side to have played continuously in the top flight – without ever having been relegated – from when the league was formed in 1963, until they were relegated in the 2017–18 season, finishing in 17th place. They had shared that special status with Eintracht Frankfurt and 1. FC Kaiserslautern until 1996, and with 1. FC Köln until 1998. The Bundesliga celebrated its 40th anniversary on 24 August 2004 with a match between "The Dinosaur", as the club has been nicknamed due to its old age, and Bayern Munich, the league's most successful side.

In August 1963, HSV defeated Borussia Dortmund 3–0 at Hanover's Niedersachsenstadion to win the club's first DFB-Pokal. In the same month, the club played its first Bundesliga match, drawing 1–1 with Preußen Münster. HSV finished the Bundesliga's first season in sixth place, with Uwe Seeler scoring 30 goals to secure the Torjägerkanone. He was also named Footballer of the Year for the second time. The DFB-Pokal victory enabled HSV to play in the 1963–64 European Cup Winners' Cup, where they reached the quarter-final, falling to Lyon.

In 1967, HSV again reached the final of the DFB-Pokal where they were defeated 4–0 by Bayern Munich. HSV, however, were admitted to the following season's European Cup Winners' Cup, where they lost to Milan in the final.

In 1970, Seeler was named Footballer of the Year for the third time. He retired at the end of the 1971–72 season in front of 72,000 fans at the Volksparkstadion. He ended his career with 137 goals from 239 Bundesliga matches and 507 goals from 587 appearances in all competitions. In the same season, HSV played in the UEFA Cup for the first time, but were knocked out in the first round by Scottish side St Johnstone.

=== Golden era ===
In 1973, HSV won the first edition of the DFB-Ligapokal, beating Borussia Mönchengladbach 4–0 in the final. A year later, they reached the DFB-Pokal final, where they were beaten by Eintracht Frankfurt. In 1976, HSV reached another DFB-Pokal final, beating 1. FC Kaiserslautern 2–0 to win the trophy for the second time in the club's history. The following year, HSV achieved its first international success with a 2–0 win over Anderlecht in the final of the 1976–77 European Cup Winners' Cup. The club then signed English player Kevin Keegan from European champions Liverpool. After spending much of the previous decade in mid-table, HSV achieved their best Bundesliga position in 1974–75 by finishing fourth. The club bettered this in 1975–76, with a second-place finish. Keegan's first season there saw the club go down to tenth place, however, the player himself was named European Footballer of the Year.

In 1978, Branko Zebec was appointed trainer of HSV. The Yugoslav led the club to its first Bundesliga title in his first season in charge. Keegan was top scorer for die Rothosen, and was awarded the Ballon d'Or for a second successive year.

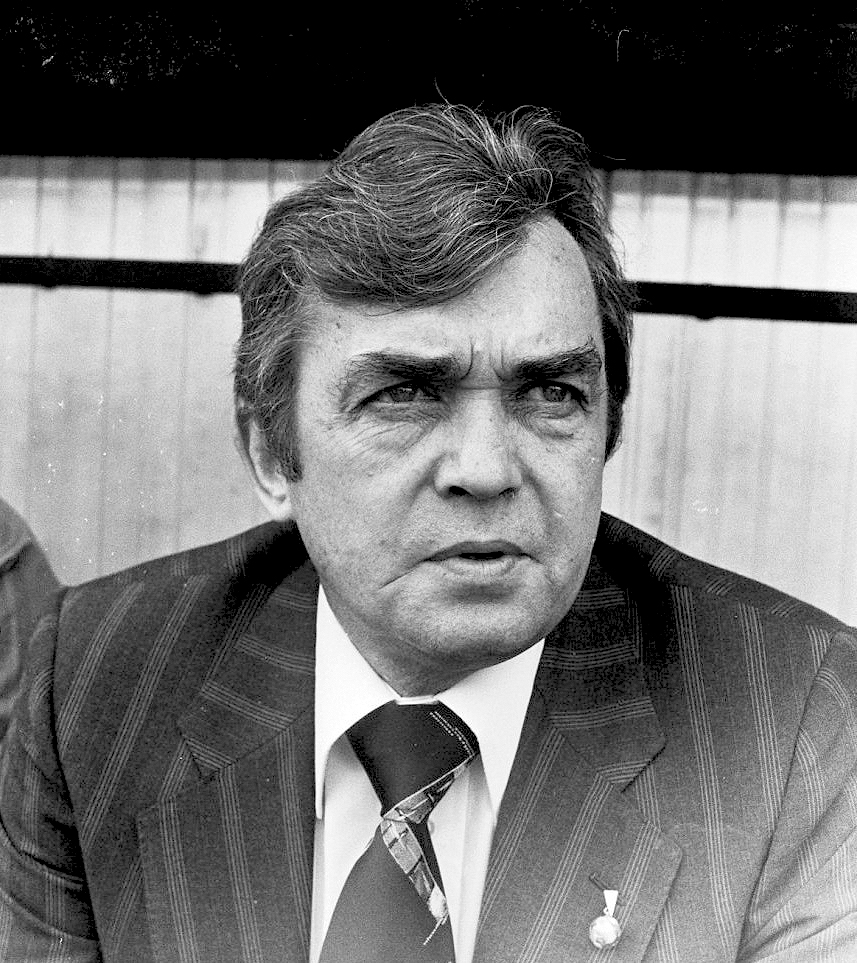
Ernst Happel, the most successful manager of the club, won the European Cup in 1983, the Bundesliga in 1982 and 1983, and the DFB-Pokal in 1987.

In the 1979–80 season, HSV returned to the European Cup for the first time since 1960–61. As had happened 19 years previously, HSV faced Spanish opposition in the semi-finals. After losing the first leg at the Santiago Bernabéu Stadium 2–0, HSV beat six-time winners Real Madrid 5–1 at the Volksparkstadion to qualify for the final. HSV returned to Madrid to play Nottingham Forest in the final, where they were beaten 1–0. In the Bundesliga, HSV lost their title by two points, finishing in second place behind champions Bayern Munich.

In December 1980, HSV dismissed Zebec, who had been struggling with a drinking problem. His assistant Aleksandar Ristić was appointed caretaker for the remainder of the season and secured a second-place finish in the Bundesliga.

In 1981, Austrian coach Ernst Happel was appointed as Zebec's permanent replacement. In his first season, his HSV side regained the Bundesliga title, and reached the UEFA Cup final, where they lost 4–0 on aggregate to Sweden's IFK Göteborg.

Between 16 January 1982 and 29 January 1983, HSV went undefeated in the Bundesliga. The run stretched across 36 games and remained a Bundesliga record until November 2013, when it was broken by Bayern Munich.

A third Meisterschale followed at the end of the 1982–83 season, with HSV defending their title against local rivals Werder Bremen on goal difference. The same year, HSV defeated Juventus 1–0 in Athens to win the club's first European Cup.

In December 1983, HSV traveled to Tokyo where they faced South American champions Grêmio in the Intercontinental Cup. The Brazilian club took home the trophy, with a 93rd minute winning goal. Back home, they lost the league championship to VfB Stuttgart on goal difference.

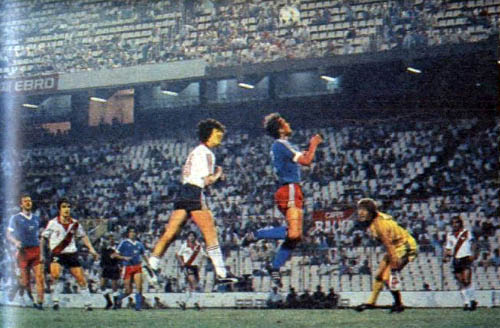
HSV (in blue jersey) vs Argentine team River Plate, "Trofeo Naranja" match, August 1984

Both 1984–85 and 1985–86 were low seasons for HSV, with the club finishing fifth and seventh respectively. In 1986, midfielder Felix Magath, who had played for the club for ten years and scored the winning goal in the 1983 European Cup Final, retired from professional football.

In 1986–87, HSV finished second in the Bundesliga and won a fourth DFB-Pokal, beating Stuttgarter Kickers 3–1 in the final at West Berlin's Olympiastadion. After this success, Ernst Happel left the club to return to Austria. He remains HSV's most successful trainer, with two Bundesliga titles, one DFB-Pokal and one European Cup.

=== Modern era ===
In the early 1990s, HSV fell in financial trouble. Thomas Doll was sold to Lazio for a then record 16 million Deutsche Marks in June 1991. On the pitch, meanwhile, the team was in decline. After a fifth-place finish in 1990–91, HSV finished in the bottom half of the Bundesliga in four consecutive seasons.

In October 1995, Felix Magath returned to HSV to become the club's trainer. The following month, Uwe Seeler also returned as the club president. Under the new regime, HSV finished fifth in the Bundesliga, securing European qualification for the first time in six years. The following season, HSV reached the semi-finals of the DFB-Pokal. In May 1997, however, Magath was fired after a 4–0 defeat to 1. FC Köln, with the team one place above the relegation zone. HSV eventually finished in 13th place under reserve team coach Ralf Schehr.

In 1997, HSV appointed Frank Pagelsdorf, who would coach the team for over four years, making him the longest serving trainer since Ernst Happel. A ninth-place finish in 1997–98 was followed by seventh in 1998–99 and third in 1999–2000, the team's best performance since 1986–87.

On 2 September 2000, the new Volksparkstadion was officially opened as the national team played its first 2002 FIFA World Cup qualifier, against Greece.

In 2000–01, HSV competed in the UEFA Champions League for the first time since the competition's expansion from the old European Cup. Their first match was a 4–4 draw against Juventus, with Tony Yeboah scoring the club's first Champions League goal. HSV failed to qualify for the second round, but managed a 3–1 win over Juventus in the return fixture at the Stadio delle Alpi.

In July 2003, HSV won its first trophy in 16 years with a 4–2 defeat of Borussia Dortmund in the DFB-Ligapokal final.

In August 2004, HSV lost in the early rounds of the DFB-Pokal by regional league side SC Paderborn. Referee, Robert Hoyzer, had accepted money from a Croatian gambling syndicate to fix the match, which he did, awarding two penalties to Paderborn and sending off HSV player Émile Mpenza.

Another third-place finish in 2005–06 saw HSV qualify for the Champions League for the second time. They finished bottom of Group G, with a solitary win against Russian club CSKA Moscow. In the league, the team was in 17th place going into the winter break, having won once in the league all season, leading to the dismissal of trainer Thomas Doll. Under new coach Huub Stevens, HSV advanced further away from the relegation zone and qualified for the UEFA Cup via a seventh-place finish and victory in the Intertoto Cup. The following season, Stevens led the team to fourth place in the Bundesliga before leaving to take over at Dutch champions PSV Eindhoven. He was replaced by Martin Jol, who took HSV to the semi-finals of both the 2008–09 UEFA Cup and the 2008–09 DFB-Pokal, both of which die Rothosen lost to rivals Werder Bremen. In the league, they did not qualify for the Champions League on the final day of the season. In the summer of 2009, after only one season, Jol departed to become coach of Ajax.

Under new coach Bruno Labbadia, HSV reached the semi-finals of the UEFA Cup (now renamed the UEFA Europa League) for the second season in a row. However, a defeat in the away leg to Fulham, days after the firing of Labbadia, denied the club the opportunity to play in the final, which was held at its home stadium.

On 13 October 2011, Thorsten Fink was appointed as coach with the team in the relegation zone after losing six of their opening eight matches. In HSV's first nine games under Fink they were unbeaten, going into the winter break in 13th place. The team finished the season in 15th position, avoiding by five points what would have been its first relegation. In 2012–13, HSV recorded a seventh-place finish. During the season, however, the team equaled the club's record Bundesliga defeat, losing 9–2 at the Allianz Arena to Bayern Munich.

Fink was replaced on 25 September 2013 by Bert van Marwijk, who in the same season was replaced by Mirko Slomka on 17 February 2014. Under Slomka, the club narrowly avoided its first relegation from the Bundesliga in May 2014, by defeating Greuther Fürth on the away goals rule in a play-off.

Hamburg once again changed managers due to a poor start of the season, firing Slomka in 2014. His successor Josef Zinnbauer held the job until March of said year and was replaced by interim coach Peter Knäbel, who was eventually replaced by returning Bruno Labbadia, who saved the club at the end of the season in the relegation play-off for the second year running against Karlsruher SC. Labbadia achieved only two points in the first ten games of the 2016–17 season, and was replaced by Markus Gisdol, reached 20 points in 9 games from the 19th match day to the 28th match day. On the last match day, Hamburg avoided the relegation play-offs and stayed in the Bundesliga.

==== Relegation and missed promotions ====
In the 2017–18 Bundesliga, after a 3–1 defeat in the first round of DFB-Pokal against the third-division team VfL Osnabrück, HSV had two wins against FC Augsburg and 1. FC Köln. However, eight games followed without a win. At the end of the first half of the season, HSV was in second last place in the table. After two defeats in the first two games of the second half, coach Markus Gisdol was dismissed. HSV hired Bernd Hollerbach, a former player of the club, as a new coach. After seven games without a win and a 6–0 defeat against Bayern Munich, he was also dismissed in 2018. A few days before the game against Bayern, the club announced the dismissal of CEO Heribert Bruchhagen. Frank Wettstein, CFO of the club, was appointed as the new CEO. On the day of his appointment, he dismissed the sports director Jens Todt. The club hired former successful HSV player Thomas von Heesen as a sports consultant until the end of season. For the last eight games in the 2017–18 Bundesliga, the club promoted the coach of Hamburger SV II, Christian Titz. In the Regionalliga Nord (fourth league), his team were the top of the table. With four wins and an offensively minded style of play, the coach convinced the club and received a two-year contract.

After the low season in the 2017–18 Bundesliga under three different coaches, a final day win over Borussia Mönchengladbach was not enough to escape relegation after Wolfsburg won against Köln 4–1. They were relegated to the 2. Bundesliga for the first time in the Bundesliga's 55-year history, causing riots by Hamburg supporters.

After the relegation Christian Titz was sacked in October 2018, and replaced by Hannes Wolf. Hamburg did not gain promotion back to the Bundesliga, and failed to reach the playoffs, with a one-point difference between them and Union Berlin. The team reached the semi-finals of the 2018–19 DFB-Pokal, before being defeated by RB Leipzig 1–3 at home.

For the 2019–20 2. Bundesliga, their second year in the 2. Bundesliga, Wolf was laid-off and was replaced by Dieter Hecking. They did not get a return to the Bundesliga by one-point, and they were eliminated in the second round of the 2019–20 DFB Pokal by Vfb Stuttgart 1–2 in extra time.

By again missing promotion, Hecking's contract was not extended. For the 2020–21 season, Daniel Thioune was brought in as the new head coach from league rivals VfL Osnabrück. The season began with a 1–4 first-round knockout loss in the DFB-Pokal to 3. Liga club Dynamo Dresden. Despite this loss, HSV then started the season and won the first 5 games. After a subsequent winless streak of 5 games, 3 of which were lost in a row, the team stabilised again from matchday 11 and went undefeated until the winter break. HSV ended the season as first in the league table. From matchday 20 and onwards, HSV were again winless for 5 games. After 2 wins, another winless series of 5 games followed from matchday 27 and onwards, during which, the club drew against Hannover 96 3–3. The club also lost to relegation candidates SV Sandhausen. Due to this development, Thioune was released at the beginning of May 2021, and replaced by the head of academy Horst Hrubesch for the final three games of the season. At that point, HSV were in third place with 52 points, five points from a spot guaranteeing direct promotion.

In the 2021–22 season, HSV reached the promotion playoff spot, finishing third on goal difference over Darmstadt 98. Once again, however, the season ended with HSV losing to Bundesliga's 16th place side Hertha Berlin 1–2 in the playoff, losing 0–2 at home, despite winning the first leg in Berlin. In the DFB-Pokal, Hamburg reached the semi-finals, where they lost 1–3 to SC Freiburg.

In the 2022–23 season, their fifth season in the 2. Bundesliga, the club had the highest spectator average of any second-division club in Europe. During that season, Hamburger SV were in the top three places since matchday 6, and finished the year 2022 in second place. On the last matchday, HSV played an away match against SV Sandhausen, where they won 1–0, and as SSV Jahn Regensburg were leading 2–1 against second-place 1. FC Heidenheim, HSV were about to be promoted to Bundesliga. However, during eleven minutes of stoppage time, Heidenheim scored two goals to finish top; hence, Hamburger SV had to play the promotion/relegation play-offs against VfB Stuttgart. They lost both legs, missing promotion to the top division for the fifth year in a row.

In the 2023–24 season, HSV spent the majority of the season in the top three, only briefly slipping down to fourth on matchday 19, when they lost 3–4 against Karlsruher SC. However, following a 1–1 against Greuther Fürth on matchday 27, they dropped to fourth place, where they remained for the rest of the season. For a sixth time in a row, HSV narrowly missed promotion to the Bundesliga, while the club's rivals FC St. Pauli and Holstein Kiel were both promoted.

==== 2024–2025 season: Promotion ====
In the 2024–25 season, Hamburg finally achieved their goal, as they were promoted to the Bundesliga after a seven year wait. A 6–1 win over Ulm sealed promotion with a matchday to spare. There were scenes of wild jubilation as the match ended. Notably, the pitch grass was completely plucked out. There were injuries due to crowd crush, with one fan in critical condition and 19 others rushed to hospital. Even though they were promoted, they did not win the title, finishing runners-up as they lost 3–2 away against Greuther Furth, while Koln convincingly beat Kaiserslauten 4–0, clinching both the title and promotion for them.

== Stadium ==
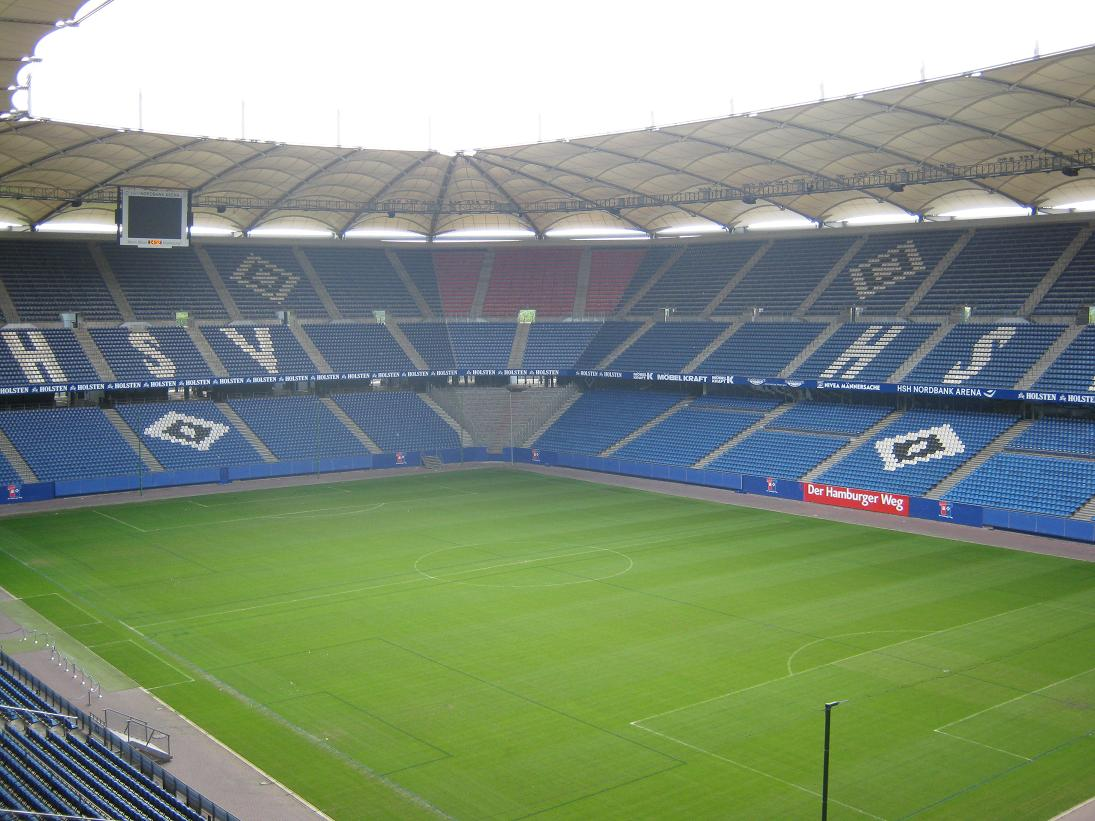
The Volksparkstadion

Hamburger SV plays its home games in the Volksparkstadion, which was previously known as the Imtech Arena between 2010 and 2015. Built on the site of the original Volksparkstadion, opened in 1953, the current stadium was opened in 2000, and has a capacity of 57,000 – approximately 47,000 seats with another 10,000 spectators standing. The first Volksparkstadion had been a venue for the 1974 World Cup and UEFA Euro 1988. The Volksparkstadion is a UEFA category one stadium, which certifies it to host UEFA Europa League and UEFA Champions League finals. The stadium was the site of four group matches and a quarter-final of the 2006 World Cup, hosted by Germany, and was known as FIFA World Cup Stadium Hamburg during the event. It was also the venue for the 2010 UEFA Europa League Final.

HSV fans can be buried at a dedicated graveyard near the home stadium, covered in turf from the original Hamburg pitch.

== Rivals and affinities ==
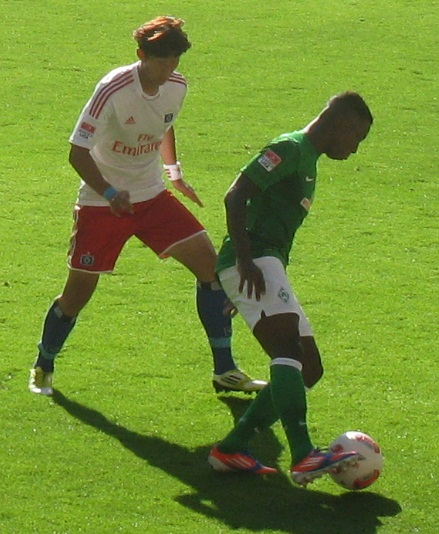
Hamburg against rivals Werder Bremen in the Nordderby

HSV contests the Nordderby with fellow Northern Germany side Werder Bremen. In Spring 2009, HSV faced Werder four times in only three weeks, and Werder defeated HSV in the UEFA-Cup semi-final, as well as in the DFB-Pokal semi-final.

Furthermore, HSV shares a cross-town rivalry with FC St. Pauli. When, after seven years in different leagues, the teams were due to meet again, disputes between fan groups began several weeks before the game. It started when about 100 HSV fans interrupted a St. Pauli concert because it took place on the "HSV-side" of the Reeperbahn. In a league game, the HSV fans showed a banner in the stadium with the inscription "Stellt euch endlich unsrer Gier – 100 Ihr : 100 Wir" ("Finally satisfy our lust – 100 of you vs. 100 of us"). After fans of St. Pauli attacked HSV fans working on a choreography for the game and destroyed parts of it, some HSV fans threatened them by hanging figures in the colours of the rival at several bridges throughout the city. In addition, one day later there was a march of about 80 HSV-Ultras across the Reeperbahn, where insulting chants against St. Pauli were screamed. In the hours leading up to first 2. Bundesliga Hamburg Derby on 10 March 2019 at the Millerntor-Stadion, the supporters groups of both teams were escorted by the Hamburg police to avoid conflict. They won with a 4–0 scoreline, the first time HSV had won at the stadium since 1962. In response to Benedikt Pliquett's celebratory kick of HSV's corner flag at the Volksparkstadion in 2011, Tom Mickel mimicked Pliquett with a "Kung-Fu Kick" of his own, according to MOPO.

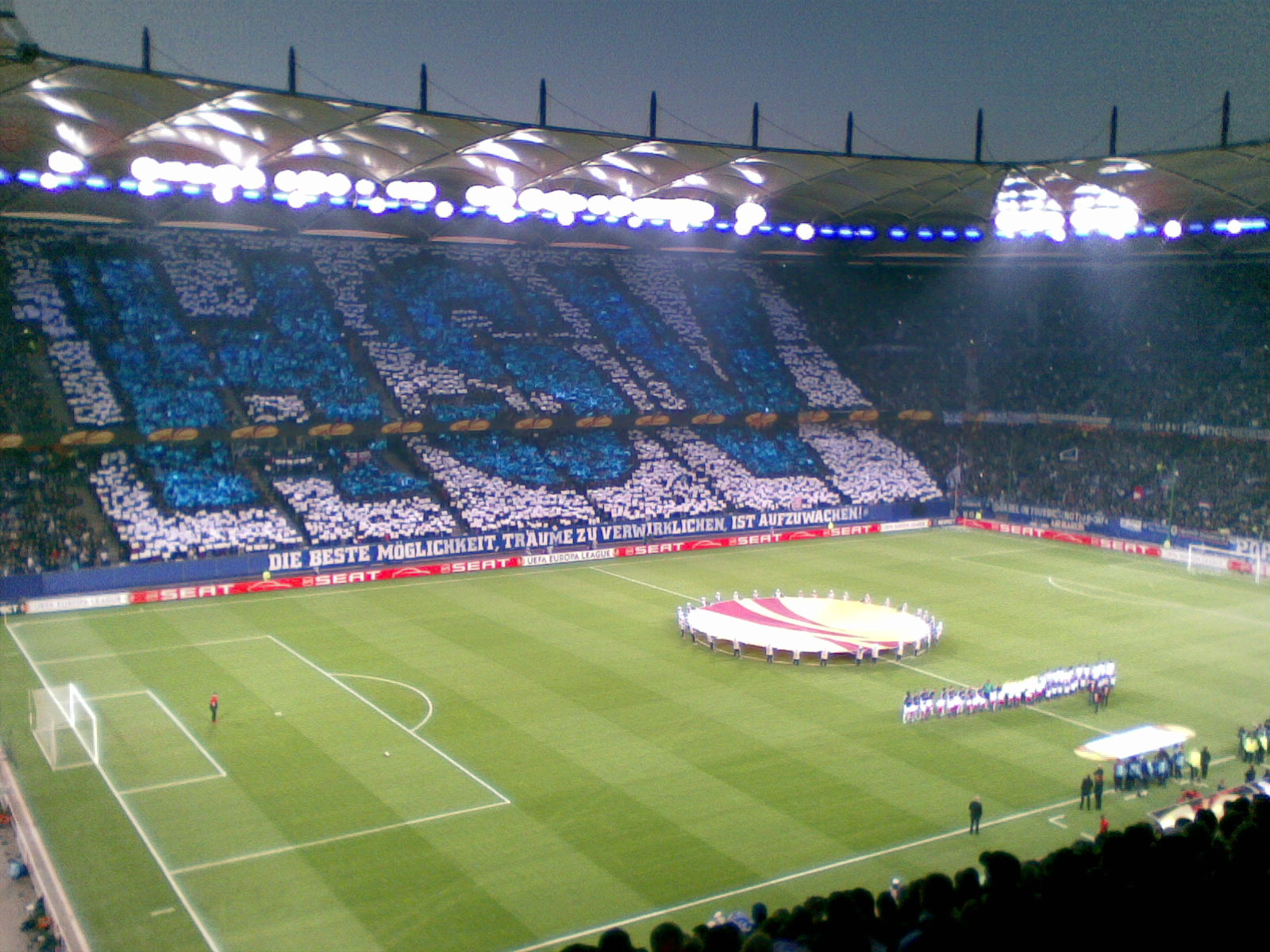
A HSV choreography

HSV have an affinity with Scottish club Rangers. The link dates back to 1977, when Scots were moving to the German port in search of work and the Hamburg Rangers Supporters' Club was set up by HSV fans who had visited Rangers matches before and were thrilled by the atmosphere at Ibrox. The connections were further strengthened when Rangers signed Jörg Albertz from Hamburg in the 1990s, and was formalised in February 2021 with the establishment of an official club partnership. Conversely, St. Pauli has a long-standing friendship with Rangers' city rivals, Celtic, due to both the HSV-Rangers connections and the shared left-wing politics of Celtic and St. Pauli fans. When they played each other in the Europa League in 2009, HSV fans provoked Celtic (whose fanbase have historically been sympathetic to Irish republicanism) with a controversial tifo of a Union Jack bearing the words "No Surrender", a popular Ulster loyalist slogan which originated from the Northern Irish ethnoreligious conflict known as the Troubles.

HSV have a friendship bond with Hannover 96 due to both being known by the abbreviation "HSV". Their meetings involve the visitors' club song being played, and fans chanting "HSV" from each end of the stadium.

Furthermore, Hamburger SV has a friendship bond with Arminia Bielefeld – both teams share the same colours, resulting in the popular fan chant "Schwarz, weiß, blau – Arminia und der HSV" ("Black, white, blue – Arminia and the HSV"). Especially in the 1990s, multiple players transferred between the two clubs.

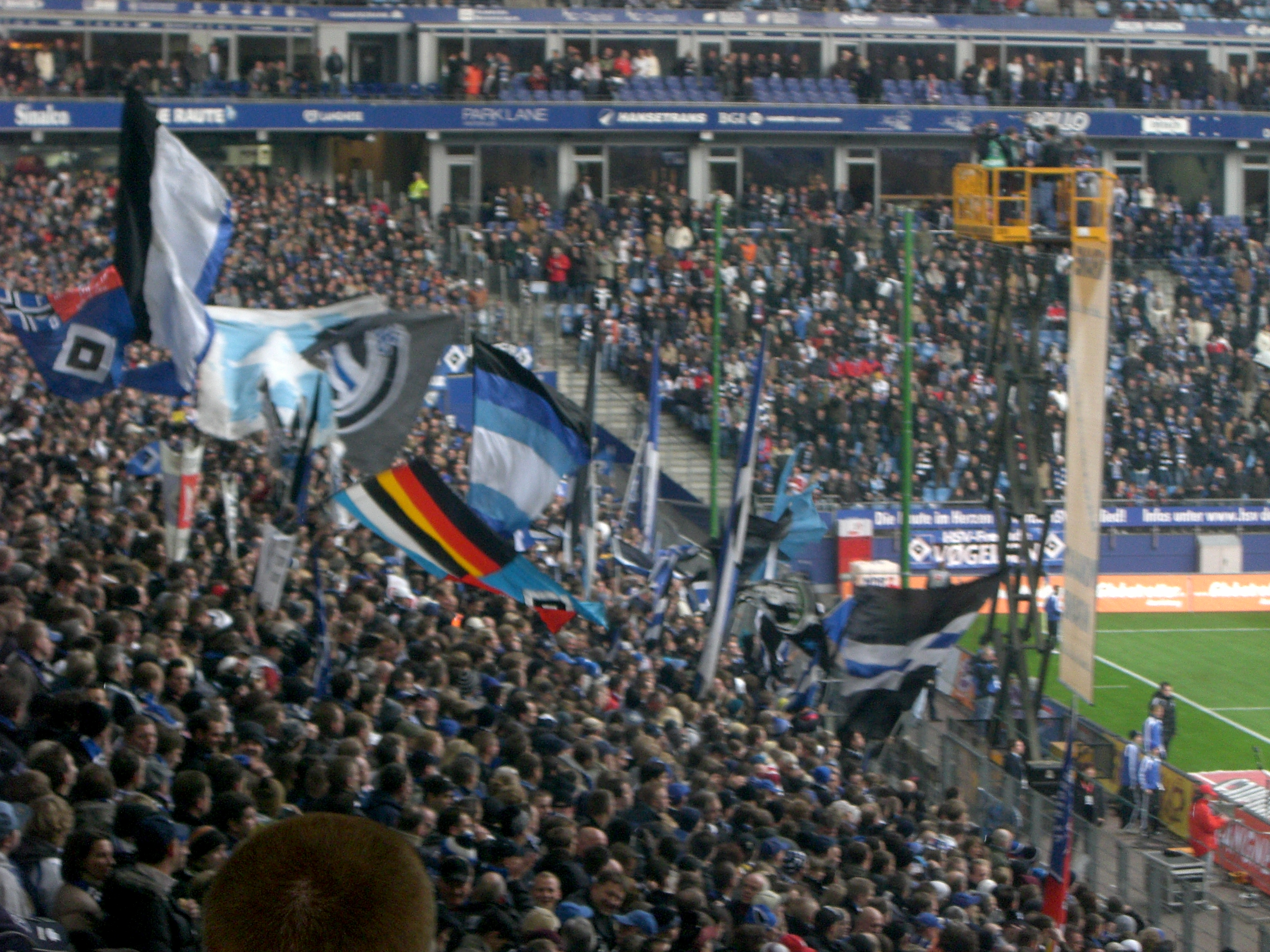
HSV fans before a game against Lotte

In addition, some fan groups maintain good contacts with the fourth division team VfB Lübeck, whose fans also have an aversion to St. Pauli and Holstein Kiel. In 2013, HSV helped the club, which was threatened by insolvency, with a free friendly match, in which the team competed with several national players to attract as many spectators as possible and left the entire earnings for VfB Lübeck.

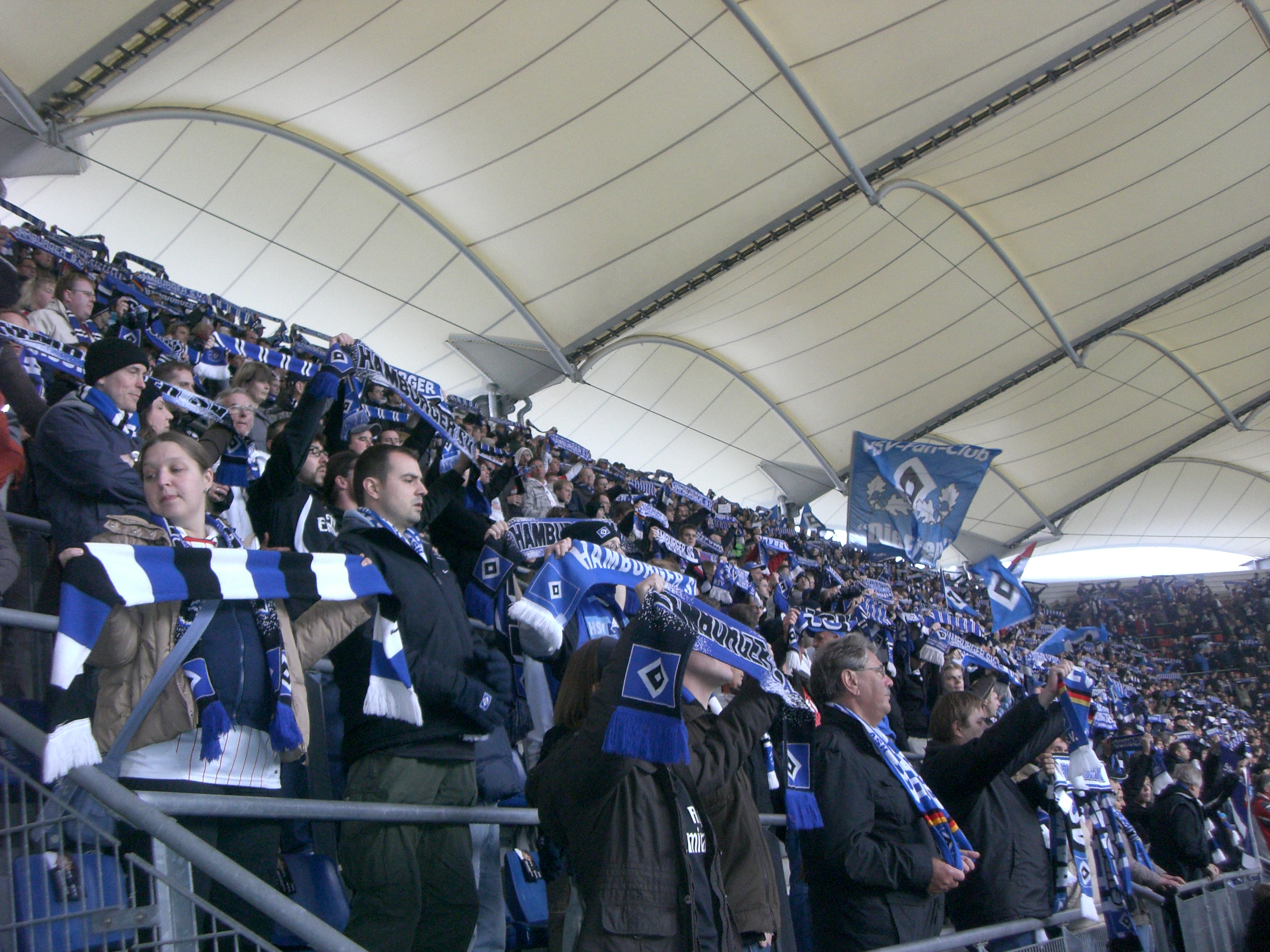
HSV supporters

== Fans ==
The band Abschlach! has written the HSV anthem "Mein Hamburg lieb ich sehr". The band performs this song before every HSV games.

HSV has more than 700 officially registered fan clubs in Germany and abroad. These include "Rautengeil Fallingbostel", "Hermanns Treue Riege", "Totale Offensive e. V." and the "Wilhelmsburg Boys". HSV ultra groups are or were the "Clique du Nord", "Poptown", and "Chosen Few". The "Rothosen" supporters' association founded in April 1972 is the oldest HSV fan club. It still has around 40 members. The business fan club of Hamburger SV was registered by HSV as an official fan club in 2006. This fan club was founded by entrepreneurs and combines sporting interests with business interests. Since the 2006–07 season, the Hamburger Sport-Verein has had a fan club for gay and bisexual fans called "BLUE PRIDE", which merged into the "Volksparkjunxx" in January 2012. The members of fan club "Die Löwen" are aggressive. The group was associated with skinheads and right-wing radicalism in the 1980s. The Bremen fan Adrian Maleika was murdered by members of the group on 16 October 1982.

As a reaction to the murder of Adrian Maleika, the HSV fan project was founded, which still exists today and is financially supported by the German Football League and the Hamburg Authority for Labour, Social Affairs, Family and Integration. The fan project makes travel offers for away games and supports the Supporters Club with its offers. Numerous events take place in the fan house, also with the support of HSV itself.

The Supporters Club, founded in 1993, has (as of 1 June 2019) been joined by 66,489 fans, who have thus also become members of HSV. The 36 founding members include the former board member responsible for membership matters, Oliver Scheel, the former supervisory board members Henning Trolsen and Christian Reichert, and the current director of the HSV Museum, Dirk Mansen.

As a reaction to the spin-off, fans founded the "HFC Falke" – based on the model of FC United of Manchester – which started playing in the 2015–16 season, and as of 2024, are playing in the Hamburg district league north.

== Club kit and colours ==
The club colours are officially blue, white and black, according to its statute, but its fans use the combination "schwarz-weiss-blau" (black-white-blue) in their songs and chants; they also chant "HSV" [haː ʔɛs ˈfaʊ̯]. The club crest is a black and white diamond on a blue background. These were the colours of SC Germania. The use of the blue background is a link with Hamburg's maritime tradition as the Blue Peter flag signal (meaning "All Aboard" or "Outward Bound") is a white rectangle on a similar blue background.

In contrast, the team's home kit is white jerseys and red shorts, which are the colours of the Free and Hanseatic City of Hamburg. As a result, the team's most common nickname is die Rothosen ("the Red Shorts"). HSV was previously also known as der Dinosaurier ("the Dinosaur"), and used a dinosaur mascot called "Hermann" (named after long-time club physiotherapist Hermann Rieger) for marketing purposes.

HSV's kit was made by Adidas from 1978 to 1995 and the club re-engaged Adidas in 2007, having worked with a number of its competitors in the meantime. The first shirt sponsorship was introduced in 1974. The following is a list of shirt sponsors by date:

Sponsor

Season	Sponsor
1974–1976	Campari
1976–1979	Hitachi
1979–1987	BP
1987–1994	Sharp
1994–1999	Hyundai
1999–2003	TV Spielfilm
2003–2006	ADIG
2006–2020	Emirates
2020–2022	Orthomol
2022–	HanseMerkur

Kit sponsor

Season	Kit Sponsor
1887–1965	In–House
1965–1966	Umbro
1966–1969	In–House
1969–1970	Erima
1970–1974	In–House
1974–1976	Adidas
1976–1978	Umbro
1978–1979	Adidas
1979–1980	Erima
1979–1995	Adidas
1995–1998	Uhlsport
1998–2001	Fila
2001–2005	Nike
2005–2007	Puma
2007–Present	Adidas

== In international competitions ==
HSV's first participation in European competition came after they won the German championship in 1960 and were invited to take part in the 1960–61 European Cup. They had a match in the preliminary round, and their first round opponents were Young Boys. HSV won the two-legged tie 8–3 on aggregate, beating the Swiss side 5–0 in the away leg on 2 November 1960, and then drawing 3–3 at home on 27 November.

HSV reached the semi-final of the European Cup in 1961. Subsequently, they have twice played in the final, losing 1–0 to Nottingham Forest in 1980 and defeating Juventus 1–0 in 1983. Along with Borussia Dortmund and Bayern Munich, HSV is one of three German teams who have won the European Cup. HSV won the UEFA Cup Winners' Cup in 1976–77, and have been runners-up in both that competition (1968) and the UEFA Cup (1982). They reached the semi-finals of the 2008–09 UEFA Cup, with the disappointment amplified as it was regional rivals Werder Bremen who eliminated them, then reached the same stage in the 2009–10 UEFA Europa League, missing the chance to take part in the final being played at their own stadium; that was the club's most recent European campaign.

Having lost the 1968 European Cup Winners' Cup final, the 1980 European Cup final and the 1982 UEFA Cup final, HSV became the first club in European football to have been runner-up in all three major UEFA club competitions. Additionally, having lost the European Super Cup for the first time in the 1977 edition, the 1983 Intercontinental Cup and in the 1999 UEFA Intertoto Cup, they became the first and only club in Europe to have obtained the silver medal in all six confederation competitions.

HSV's biggest win in a European match occurred on 23 October 1974 when they defeated Romanian team Brașov 8–0 in a UEFA Cup second round tie. Their biggest defeat was in the second leg of the 1977 Super Cup when they lost 6–0 to Liverpool at Anfield on 6 December. Manfred Kaltz with 81 has made the most appearances for HSV in Europe and Horst Hrubesch with 20 is their leading goalscorer.

Based on data published by UEFA, a summary of HSV's European record to the end of the 2021–22 season is as follows:

Competition	Pld	W	D	L	GF	GA	GD	Win%
UEFA Champions League / European Cup	43	19	9	15	72	56	+16	44.19
UEFA Europa League / UEFA Cup	124	67	20	37	209	132	+77	54.03
UEFA Cup Winners' Cup / European Cup Winners' Cup	34	20	7	7	81	39	+42	58.82
UEFA Super Cup / European Super Cup	4	0	2	2	1	9	−8	0.00
Intercontinental Cup	1	0	0	1	1	2	−1	0.00
Inter-Cities Fairs Cup	10	7	0	3	23	14	+9	70.00
Total	216	113	38	65	387	252	+135	52.31

According to UEFA, HSV is currently unranked among European clubs. The last year that the club had a coefficient was in 2014 when it ranked 64th (34.328).

== Honours ==
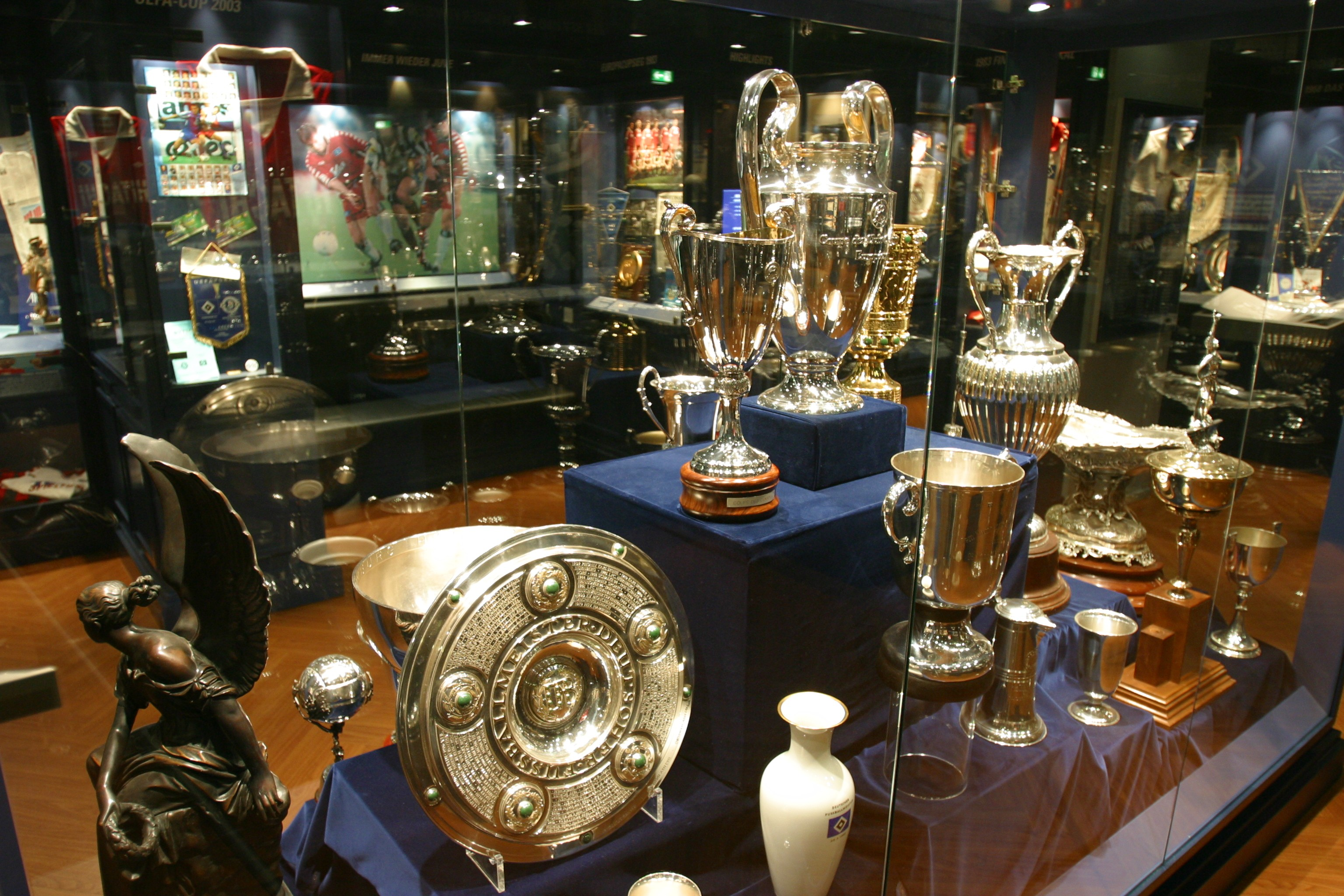
One trophy from all of the competitions Hamburg has won in the HSV-Museum

HSV have the record in German football of having won the most regional titles, having won 31 regional titles. However, the regional titles do not count as a trophy or even as a title itself. Winning a regional title only guaranteed a club to battle, with other regional winning clubs, for the German Championship.

Hamburg's three Bundesliga championships entitle the club to display one gold star of the "Verdiente Meistervereine". Under the current award system, their pre-Bundesliga championships are not recognized, and so they are not entitled to the second star of a five-time champion.

After the replay of the championship final in 1922 had to be abandoned due to the opponents no longer having enough players on the ground, the German Football Association (DFB) requested HSV to renounce the title, which the club did.

During his first season with Hamburger SV (2000–01), Sergej Barbarez became the top scorer for his club with 22 goals and joint top scorer of the Bundesliga with Ebbe Sand.

Until the 2017–18 season, HSV took pride in its status as the only club to have played continuously in the Bundesliga since its foundation. A large clock in the northwest corner of the Volksparkstadion marked the time, down to the second, since the league was founded on 24 August 1963.

=== Domestic ===
- German Champions / Bundesliga
  - Winners: 1923, 1928, 1960, 1978–79, 1981–82, 1982–83
  - Runners-up: 1923–24, 1956–57, 1957–58, 1975–76, 1979–80, 1980–81, 1983–84, 1986–87
- DFB-Pokal
  - Winners: 1962–63, 1975–76, 1986–87

  - Runners-up: 1955–56, 1966–67, 1973–74

- DFB-Ligapokal
  - Winners: 1972–73, 2003
- DFB-Supercup
  - Runners-up: 1977, 1983, 1987

=== European ===
- European Cup / UEFA Champions League
  - Winners: 1982–83
  - Runners-up: 1979–80
- European Cup Winners' Cup
  - Winners: 1976–77
  - Runners-up: 1967–68
- UEFA Cup / UEFA Europa League
  - Runners-up: 1981–82
- UEFA Super Cup
  - Runners-up: 1977, 1983
- UEFA Intertoto Cup
  - Winners: 2005, 2007 (Outright Winners)
  - Runners-up: 1999
- Intertoto Cup
  - Group Winners: 1970, 1994

=== Worldwide ===
- Intercontinental Cup
  - Runners-up: 1983

=== Double ===
- 1982–83: League and European Cup

=== Regional ===
- Northern German football championship (unrecognized)
  - Winners (10): 1921, 1922, 1923, 1924, 1925, 1928, 1929, 1931, 1932, 1933 (record)
- Oberliga Nord (unrecognized)
  - Winners (15): 1948, 1949, 1950, 1951, 1952, 1953, 1955, 1956, 1957, 1958, 1959, 1960, 1961, 1962, 1963 (record)
- Gauliga Nordmark (unrecognized)
  - Winners: 1937, 1938, 1939, 1941
- Gauliga Hamburg
  - Winners: 1945
- Stadtliga Hamburg
  - Winners: 1946
- British occupation zone championship
  - Winners: 1947, 1948 (record)

== Players ==
=== Current squad ===
As of 2 September 2026

Note: Flags indicate national team as defined under FIFA eligibility rules; some limited exceptions apply. Players may hold more than one non-FIFA nationality.

No.	Pos.	Nation	Player
1	GK	POR	Daniel Heuer Fernandes
3	DF	NOR	David Møller Wolfe (on loan from Wolverhampton Wanderers)
4	MF	MAR	Bilal Nadir
5	MF	FRA	Martin Adeline
6	MF	BEL	Albert Sambi Lokonga
7	DF	MAR	Zakaria El Ouahdi
9	FW	NGR	Terem Moffi
10	MF	SUR	Immanuel Pherai
11	MF	DEN	Albert Grønbæk
12	GK	NOR	Sander Tangvik
15	FW	DEN	Yussuf Poulsen
17	DF	COM	Warmed Omari
18	FW	GAM	Bakery Jatta
19	FW	GER	Otto Stange

No.	Pos.	Nation	Player
20	MF	POR	Fábio Vieira
21	MF	GER	Nicolai Remberg (captain)
22	MF	GER	Kofi Amoako
23	DF	NGR	Jordan Torunarigha
24	MF	ARG	Nicolás Capaldo
27	FW	ZAM	Patson Daka
28	DF	SUI	Miro Muheim
33	DF	BEL	Sebastiaan Bornauw (on loan from Leeds United)
37	DF	GER	Louis Lemke
38	FW	NOR	Alexander Røssing-Lelesiit
39	DF	GER	Joel Agyekum
40	GK	FIN	Elias Lahti
41	GK	GER	Fernando Dickes
43	DF	GER	Shafiq Nandja

=== Other players under contract ===
Note: Flags indicate national team as defined under FIFA eligibility rules; some limited exceptions apply. Players may hold more than one non-FIFA nationality.

No.	Pos.	Nation	Player
—	DF	CRO	Mario Vušković (doping ban)

=== Out on loan ===
Note: Flags indicate national team as defined under FIFA eligibility rules; some limited exceptions apply. Players may hold more than one non-FIFA nationality.

No.	Pos.	Nation	Player
—	GK	GER	Hannes Hermann (at Jahn Regensburg until 30 June 2027)
—	DF	GER	Noah Katterbach (at Eintracht Braunschweig until 30 June 2027)
—	DF	FRA	Aboubaka Soumahoro (at Mallorca until 30 June 2027)

No.	Pos.	Nation	Player
—	MF	LBA	Daniel Elfadli (at LASK until 30 June 2027)
—	FW	FRA	Rayan Philippe (at SC Paderborn until 30 June 2027)

== Personnel ==
Position	Staff
Head coach	(Germany) Merlin Polzin
Assistant coach	(Germany) Loïc Favé (Germany) Richard Krohn
Co-trainer analysis	(Germany) Max Bergmann
Performance manager	(France) Basil More-Chevalier
Goalkeeper coach	(Germany) Sven Höh
Athletic coach	(Germany) Jan Hasenkamp
Rehab coach	(Germany) Sebastian Capel
Game analyst	(Germany) Eduard Riesen (Germany) Felix Wolfmeier
Team manager	(Germany) Mats Wesling
Equipment manager	(Germany) Miroslav Zadach (Ecuador) Ramiro Guerron
Head team doctor	(Germany) Prof. Dr. Götz Welsch
Team doctor	(Germany) Dr. Wolfgang Schillings
Head physiotherapist	(Germany) Andreas Thum
Physiotherapist	(Germany) Gerrit Lüders (Germany) Tim Roussis

Last updated: 29 March 2026
Source: Hamburger SV official website

=== Head coaches since 1963 ===
Name	From	To	Days	Played	Win	Drawn	Lost	Win %	Honours
(Germany) Martin Wilke	1 July 1963	7 May 1964	311	29	11	9	9	37.93	1962–63 DFB-Pokal – winner
(Germany) Georg Gawliczek	8 May 1964	17 April 1966	709	59	22	12	25	37.29	
(Germany) Josef Schneider	18 April 1966	30 June 1967	438	39	12	11	16	30.77	1966–67 DFB-Pokal – runners-up
(Germany) Kurt Koch	1 July 1967	30 June 1968	365	34	11	11	12	32.35	1967–68 European Cup Winners' Cup – runners-up
(Germany) Georg Knöpfle	1 July 1968	30 June 1970	729	68	25	21	22	36.76	
(Germany) Klaus-Dieter Ochs	1 July 1970	30 June 1973	1095	102	36	26	40	35.29	1972–73 DFB-Ligapokal – winner
(Germany) Kuno Klötzer	1 July 1973	30 June 1977	1460	136	62	29	45	45.59	1973–74 DFB-Pokal – runners-up 1975–76 Bundesliga – runners-up 1975–76 DFB-Pokal – winner 1976–77 European Cup Winners' Cup – winner
(Germany) Rudi Gutendorf	1 July 1977	27 October 1977	118	12	6	1	5	50.00	1977 DFB-Supercup – runners-up
(Turkey) Özcan Arkoç	28 October 1977	30 June 1978	245	22	8	5	9	36.36	1977 European Super Cup – runners-up
(Socialist Federal Republic of Yugoslavia) Branko Zebec	1 July 1978	18 December 1980	901	85	54	17	14	63.53	1978–79 Bundesliga – winner 1979–80 Bundesliga – runners-up 1979–80 European Cup – runners-up
(Socialist Federal Republic of Yugoslavia) Aleksandar Ristić	19 December 1980	30 June 1981	193	17	8	5	4	47.06	1980–81 Bundesliga – runners-up
(Austria) Ernst Happel	1 July 1981	30 June 1987	2190	204	109	53	42	53.43	1981–82 Bundesliga – winner 1981–82 UEFA Cup – runners-up 1982–83 Bundesliga – winner 1982–83 European Cup – winner 1983 Intercontinental Cup – runners-up 1983 European Super Cup – runners-up 1983 DFB-Supercup – runners-up 1983–84 Bundesliga – runners-up 1986–87 Bundesliga – runners-up 1986–87 DFB-Pokal – winner
(Socialist Federal Republic of Yugoslavia) Josip Skoblar	1 July 1987	9 November 1987	131	15	5	4	6	33.33	1987 DFB-Supercup – runners-up
(Germany) Willi Reimann	11 November 1987	4 January 1990	785	75	32	19	24	42.67	
(Germany) Gerd-Volker Schock	5 January 1990	10 March 1992	795	73	28	22	23	38.36	
(Germany) Egon Coordes	12 March 1992	21 September 1992	193	19	3	8	8	15.79	
(Germany) Benno Möhlmann	23 September 1992	5 October 1995	1107	105	31	36	38	29.52	
(Germany) Felix Magath	6 October 1995	18 May 1997	590	58	21	18	19	36.21	
(Germany) Ralf Schehr*	19 May 1997	30 June 1997	42	2	1	1	0	50.00	
(Germany) Frank Pagelsdorf	1 July 1997	17 September 2001	1593	142	51	46	45	35.92	
(Germany) Holger Hieronymus*	18 September 2001	3 October 2001	15	2	0	1	1	0.00	
(Austria) Kurt Jara	4 October 2001	22 October 2003	748	69	26	20	23	37.68	2003 DFB-Ligapokal – winner
(Germany) Klaus Toppmöller	23 October 2003	17 October 2004	360	33	14	5	14	42.42	
(Germany) Thomas Doll	18 October 2004	1 February 2007	836	79	36	20	23	45.57	2005 UEFA Intertoto Cup – winner
(Netherlands) Huub Stevens	2 February 2007	30 June 2008	514	49	23	15	11	46.94	2007 UEFA Intertoto Cup – winner
(Netherlands) Martin Jol	1 July 2008	26 May 2009	329	34	19	4	11	55.88	
(Germany) Bruno Labbadia	1 July 2009	25 April 2010	298	32	12	12	8	37.50	
(Netherlands) Ricardo Moniz*	26 April 2010	30 June 2010	65	2	1	1	0	50.00	
(Germany) Armin Veh	1 July 2010	13 March 2011	255	26	11	4	11	42.31	
(Germany) Michael Oenning	14 March 2011	19 September 2011	189	15	2	6	7	13.33	
(Argentina) Rodolfo Cardoso*	19 September 2011	17 October 2011	28	3	2	0	1	66.67	
(Denmark) Frank Arnesen*	10 October 2011	16 October 2011	6	1	1	0	0	100.00	
(Germany) Thorsten Fink	17 October 2011	16 September 2013	700	64	21	18	25	32.81	2012 Peace Cup – winner
(Argentina) Rodolfo Cardoso*	17 September 2013	24 September 2013	7	1	0	0	1	0.00	
(Netherlands) Bert van Marwijk	25 September 2013	16 February 2014	144	15	3	3	9	20.00	
(Germany) Mirko Slomka	16 February 2014	15 September 2014	211	16	3	3	10	18.75	
(Germany) Josef Zinnbauer	16 September 2014	22 March 2015	187	23	6	6	11	26.09	
(Germany) Peter Knäbel*	22 March 2015	15 April 2015	24	2	0	0	2	0.00	
(Germany) Bruno Labbadia	15 April 2015	25 September 2016	529	50	16	12	22	32.00	
(Germany) Markus Gisdol	25 September 2016	21 January 2018	483	52	16	10	26	30.77	
(Germany) Bernd Hollerbach	22 January 2018	12 March 2018	49	7	0	3	4	0.00	
(Germany) Christian Titz	13 March 2018	23 October 2018	224	18	9	4	5	50.00	
(Germany) Hannes Wolf	23 October 2018	19 May 2019	208	28	14	5	9	50.00	
(Germany) Dieter Hecking	29 May 2019	30 June 2020	399	36	14	13	9	38.89	
(Germany) Daniel Thioune	6 July 2020	3 May 2021	302	32	14	10	8	43.75	
(Germany) Horst Hrubesch*	3 May 2021	30 June 2021	58	3	2	0	1	66.67	
(Germany) Tim Walter	1 July 2021	12 February 2024	949	102	51	24	27	50.00	
(Germany) Merlin Polzin*	12 February 2024	19 February 2024	7	1	0	1	0	0.00	
(Germany) Steffen Baumgart	20 February 2024	24 November 2024	278	27	12	7	8	44.44	
(Germany) Merlin Polzin	24 November 2024	present	522	58	22	18	18	37.93	

Last updated: 29 May 2026

* Served as caretaker coach.

== Other sections ==
=== HSV-Panthers (Futsal) ===
The Futsal section of Hamburger SV competes under the name "HSV Panthers", which emerged from the Hamburg Panthers. They play in the highest German Futsal division, the Futsal Bundesliga.

The team is a founding member of the Futsal Bundesliga of the German Football Association. The team has won the Deutsche Futsal Meisterschaft four times and is therefore German record champion. The HSV Panthers were also represented four times internationally in the UEFA Futsal Champions League, in 2015 they were the first German team to qualify for the elite round. With Michael Meyer, Onur Saglam, Dennis Oztürk, Sid Ziskin, Nico Zankl, and Ian-Prescott Claus, six German futsal national players play in the ranks of Hamburger SV.

=== Hamburger SV II ===
The reserve team serves as the second team for young players before being promoted to the main team.

=== Women's football ===
The women's section was created in 1970. The team played in the Bundesliga between 2003 and 2012.

=== Other sports ===
The club's rugby section was established in 1925, but ceased operation in the 1990s. It was re-established in March 2006. The club's men's baseball section, HSV Hamburg, known as the Stealers, was established in 1985, and plays in the first division of the Baseball Bundesliga. Other sections include volleyball and cricket. Okka Rau qualified for the 2008 Beijing Olympics of volleyball. HSV Cricket plays in the league of the North German Cricket Federation (Norddeutscher Cricket Verband), winning several first places.
