= Ralf Schehr =

German football coach (born 1953)

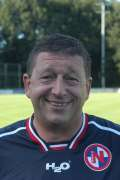
- Eintracht Norderstedt 2006

Personal information
- Date of birth: 28 October 1953 (age 73)

Team information
- Current team: Eintracht Norderstedt (youth coordinator)

Managerial career
- Years: Team
- 1995–1999: Hamburger SV II
- 1997: Hamburger SV (caretaker)
- 2004–2005: SC Concordia Hamburg
- 2005–2007: Eintracht Norderstedt
- 2007–present: Eintracht Norderstedt (youth coordinator)

Ralf Schehr (born 28 October 1953) is a German football coach. He is currently youth coordinator for Eintracht Norderstedt.

He was the second team coach at Hamburger SV when he took charge of the main team with two games left to play in the 1996/97 season. They beat Borussia Dortmund 2:1 in his first game to become safe from relegation. The second game was a tie and he remains the only HSV coach who is unbeaten in his career at the helm.
