= Revolverheld (album) =

Studio album by Revolverheld
- Released: 23 September 2005
- Genre: Alternative rock; pop rock
- Language: German
- Label: Sony BMG
- Producer: Niels Grötsch; Kristoffer Hünecke; Clemens Matznick

Revolverheld chronology
Revolverheld (2005)	Chaostheorie (2007)

Revolverheld is the debut album by German band Revolverheld. It was released by Sony BMG on 23 September 2005 in German-speaking Europe.

== Track listing ==
All songs written by Johannes Strate, Niels Grötsch, Kristoffer Hünecke.

Revolverheld – Standard edition
No.	Title	Length
1.	"Generation Rock"	2:44
2.	"Roboter"	2:52
3.	"Freunde bleiben"	3:54
4.	"Die Welt steht still"	3:36
5.	"Rock'n'Roll"	2:56
6.	"An dich"	2:44
7.	"Beste Zeit deines Lebens"	4:03
8.	"Arme hoch"	2:31
9.	"Alarm"	3:16
10.	"Romeo"	3:18
11.	"Wenn du sagst"	4:23
12.	"Mit dir chilln"	3:58

Revolverheld – Special edition
No.	Title	Length
13.	"Guten Tag"	3:23
14.	"Superheld"	4:01

== Charts ==
=== Weekly charts ===
Chart (2005)	Peak position
Austrian Albums (Ö3 Austria)	27
German Albums (Offizielle Top 100)	7

=== Year-end charts ===
Chart (2006)	Position
German Albums (Offizielle Top 100)	49

== Certifications ==
Region	Certification	Certified units/sales
Germany (BVMI)	Platinum	200,000^{^}
^{^} Shipments figures based on certification alone.
