= Zimmer mit Blick =

Studio album by Revolverheld
- Released: 13 April 2018
- Language: German
- Label: Sony BMG

Revolverheld chronology
Immer in Bewegung (2013)	Zimmer mit Blick (2018)	Neu erzählen (2021)

Zimmer mit Blick (English: Room with a View) is the fifth studio album by German band Revolverheld. Their first regular album in five years, it was released by Sony BMG on 13 April 2018 in German-speaking Europe.

== Track listing ==
No.	Title	Length
1.	"Immer noch fühlen"	3:27
2.	"Sieben Seelen"	3:57
3.	"Das Herz schlägt bis zum Hals"	4:13
4.	"Liebe auf Distanz"	3:44
5.	"So wie jetzt"	3:32
6.	"Ich kann nicht aufhören unser Leben zu lieben"	3:18
7.	"Die Stille im Lärm"	3:10
8.	"Unsere Geschichte ist erzählt"	4:15
9.	"Unsichtbar"	3:17
10.	"Du kannst auf mich zählen"	3:53
11.	"Immer geliebt"	3:09
12.	"Zimmer mit Blick"	3:24

== Charts ==
Chart (2018)	Peak position
Austrian Albums (Ö3 Austria)	3
German Albums (Offizielle Top 100)	2
Swiss Albums (Schweizer Hitparade)	15

== Certifications ==
Region	Certification	Certified units/sales
Germany (BVMI)	Gold	100,000^{‡}
^{‡} Sales+streaming figures based on certification alone.
