= On the Reeperbahn at Half Past Midnight (1969 film) =

1969 film

- Directed by: Rolf Olsen; Al Adamson
- Written by: Rolf Olsen
- Produced by: Heinz Willeg
- Starring: Curd Jürgens; Heinz Reincke; Jutta D'Arcy; Heidi Kabel
- Cinematography: Heinz Hölscher
- Edited by: Renate Willeg
- Music by: Erwin Halletz
- Production company: Terra Film
- Distributed by: Constantin Film
- Release date: 9 September 1969
- Running time: 106 minutes
- Country: West Germany
- Language: German

On the Reeperbahn at Half Past Midnight (German: Auf der Reeperbahn nachts um halb eins) is a 1969 West German drama film directed by Rolf Olsen and Al Adamson and starring Curd Jürgens, Heinz Reincke, and Jutta D'Arcy. It takes its title from a popular 1912 song of the same name about Hamburg, the setting of the film. It is also known by the alternative title Shock Treatment.

The film is a remake of On the Reeperbahn at Half Past Midnight (1954).

== Main cast ==
- Curd Jürgens as Hannes Teversen
- Heinz Reincke as Pit Pitter Pittjes
- Jutta D'Arcy as Antje
- Heidi Kabel as Martha
- Horst Naumann as Mihail Bobowski
- Fritz Tillmann as Christof Lauritz
- Diana Körner as Karin Lauritz
- Fritz Wepper as Till Schippmann
- Klaus-Hagen Latwesen as Karl Seibold
- Birke Bruck as Doris Mertens
- Erik Schumann as Teddy Zakora
- Friedrich Schütter as Bruno Schulze
- Konrad Georg as Kriminalrat Norbert Krause
- Manfred Reddemann as Jens Daschke
- Karl-Otto Alberty as Hotte Priemel
- Dieter Wilken as Harry
- Gabriele Scharon as Uschi Putzkohl
- Joachim Richert as Alf
- Jürgen Lier as Uwe
- Reiner Brönneke as Klaus Boltrup

== Bibliography ==
- Quinlan, David (1981). The Illustrated Directory of Film Stars. New York: Hippocrene Books. ISBN 978-0-88254-654-4.
