= Chaostheorie =

Studio album by Revolverheld
- Released: 25 May 2007
- Genre: Alternative rock; pop rock
- Length: 42:25
- Language: German
- Label: Sony BMG

Revolverheld chronology
Revolverheld (2005)	Chaostheorie (2007)	In Farbe (2010)

Professional ratings
Review scores
Source	Rating
laut.de	(not rated, in German)

Chaostheorie (English: Chaos Theory) is the second album by German band Revolverheld. It was released by Sony BMG on 25 May 2007 in German-speaking Europe. Another commercial success, the album debuted at the number three on the German Albums Chart, and remained within the top 10 for several weeks. Chaostheorie spawned three singles, including "Ich werd' die Welt verändern", "Du explodierst" and "Unzertrennlich".

== Track listing ==
Chaostheorie – Standard edition
No.	Title	Length
1.	"Gegen die Zeit"	2:47
2.	"Ich werd' die Welt verändern"	3:07
3.	"Superstars"	3:24
4.	"Unzertrennlich"	3:39
5.	"Hologramm"	3:31
6.	"Nichts bereuen"	2:58
7.	"Längst verloren"	3:13
8.	"Du explodierst"	3:25
9.	"Unsterblich"	3:16
10.	"Wir könnten die Größten sein"	2:57
11.	"Patient in meiner Psychiatrie (Chaostheorie)"	3:12
12.	"Hallo Welt"	3:19

Chaostheorie – Limited edition bonus tracks
No.	Title	Length
13.	"Glücklich sterben"	2:44
14.	"Für uns"	3:30

Chaostheorie – Re-edition bonus tracks
No.	Title	Length
13.	"Helden 2008"	3:02
14.	"Heimspiel"	3:31

== Charts ==
Chart (2007)	Peak position
Austrian Albums (Ö3 Austria)	17
German Albums (Offizielle Top 100)	3
