= Immer in Bewegung =

Studio album by Revolverheld
- Released: 20 September 2013
- Genres: Alternative rock; pop rock
- Language: German
- Label: Sony BMG
- Producer: Philipp Steinke

Revolverheld chronology
In Farbe (2010)	Immer in Bewegung (2013)	Zimmer mit Blick (2018)

Immer in Bewegung (English: Constantly Moving) is the fourth studio album by German band Revolverheld. Released by Sony BMG on 20 September 2013 in German-speaking Europe, it peaked at number nine on the German Albums Chart and was eventually certified triple gold by the Bundesverband Musikindustrie (BVMI), becoming their biggest-selling album yet. Immer in Bewegung also reached number three on the Austrian Albums Chart and produced three top ten singles.

== Track listing ==
All songs written by Johannes Strate, Niels Grötsch, Kristoffer Hünecke, and Jakob Sinn.

No.	Title	Length
1.	"Immer in Bewegung"	3:57
2.	"Das kann uns keiner nehmen"	3:36
3.	"Bands deiner Jugend"	3:34
4.	"Ich lass für dich das Licht an"	3:32
5.	"Neu anfangen"	3:32
6.	"Sommer in Schweden"	4:04
7.	"Lass uns gehen"	4:06
8.	"Wir schmeißen unsere Herzen ins Feuer"	3:18
9.	"Deine Nähe tut mir weh"	3:50
10.	"Aufhören mich zu verlieren"	3:55
11.	"Hinter der Elbe New York"	3:54
12.	"Worte die bleiben"	3:20

== Charts ==
=== Weekly charts ===
Chart (2013–14)	Peak position
Austrian Albums (Ö3 Austria)	3
German Albums (Offizielle Top 100)	9
Swiss Albums (Schweizer Hitparade)	82

=== Year-end charts ===
Chart (2014)	Position
Austrian Albums (Ö3 Austria)	28
German Albums (Offizielle Top 100)	25
Chart (2015)	Position
German Albums (Offizielle Top 100)	89

== Certifications ==
Region	Certification	Certified units/sales
Austria (IFPI Austria)	Gold	7,500^{*}
Germany (BVMI)	2× Platinum	400,000^{‡}
^{*} Sales figures based on certification alone.^{‡} Sales+streaming figures based on certification alone.
