= Revolverheld =

German rock band

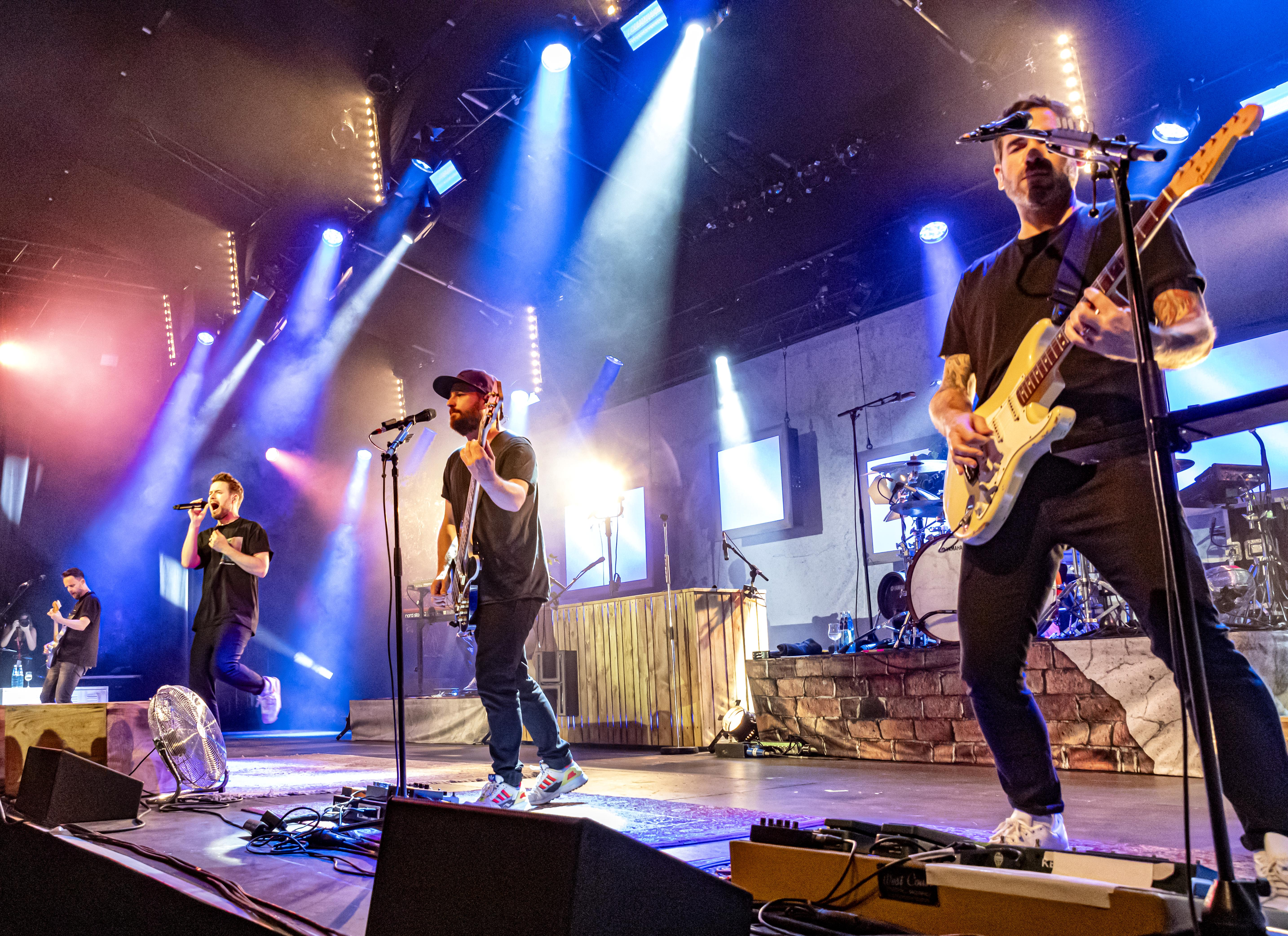
- Revolverheld performing in 2023

Background information
- Origin: Hamburg, Germany
- Genres: Deutschrock, pop rock, alternative rock, pop
- Years active: 2003–present
- Labels: Sony BMG
- Members: Johannes Strate; Kristoffer Hünecke; Niels Kristian Hansen; Jakob Sinn; Chris Rodriguez
- Past members: Florian "Flo" Speer (2002–2012)
- Website: revolverheld.net

Revolverheld (German for "gunslinger") is a German rock band from Hamburg. Originally formed under the name Manga in 2002, the band renamed in 2004 to "Tsunamikiller" and later decided upon the current name after the 2004 Indian Ocean earthquake.

== History ==
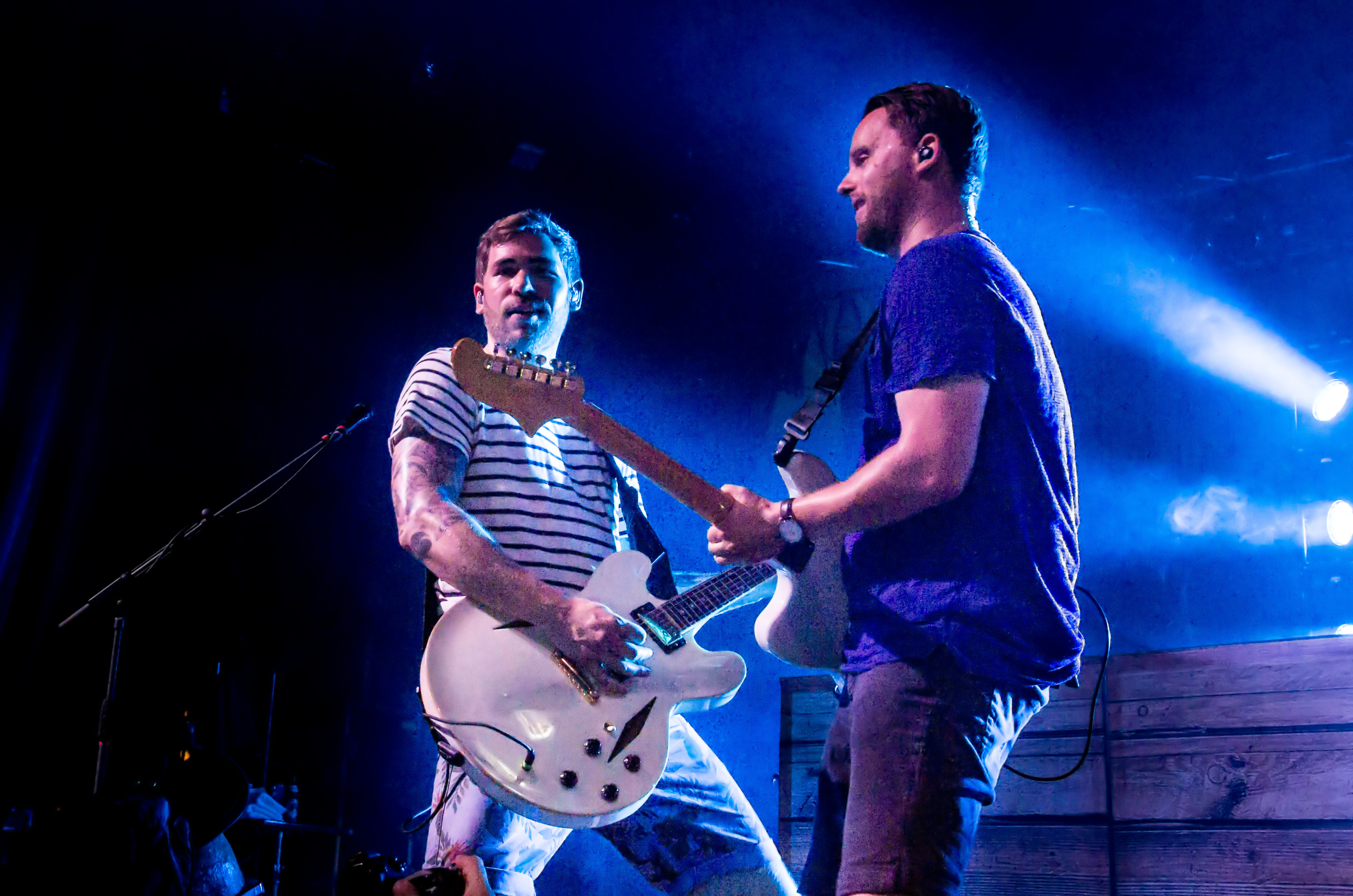
Zelt-Musik-Festival 2015

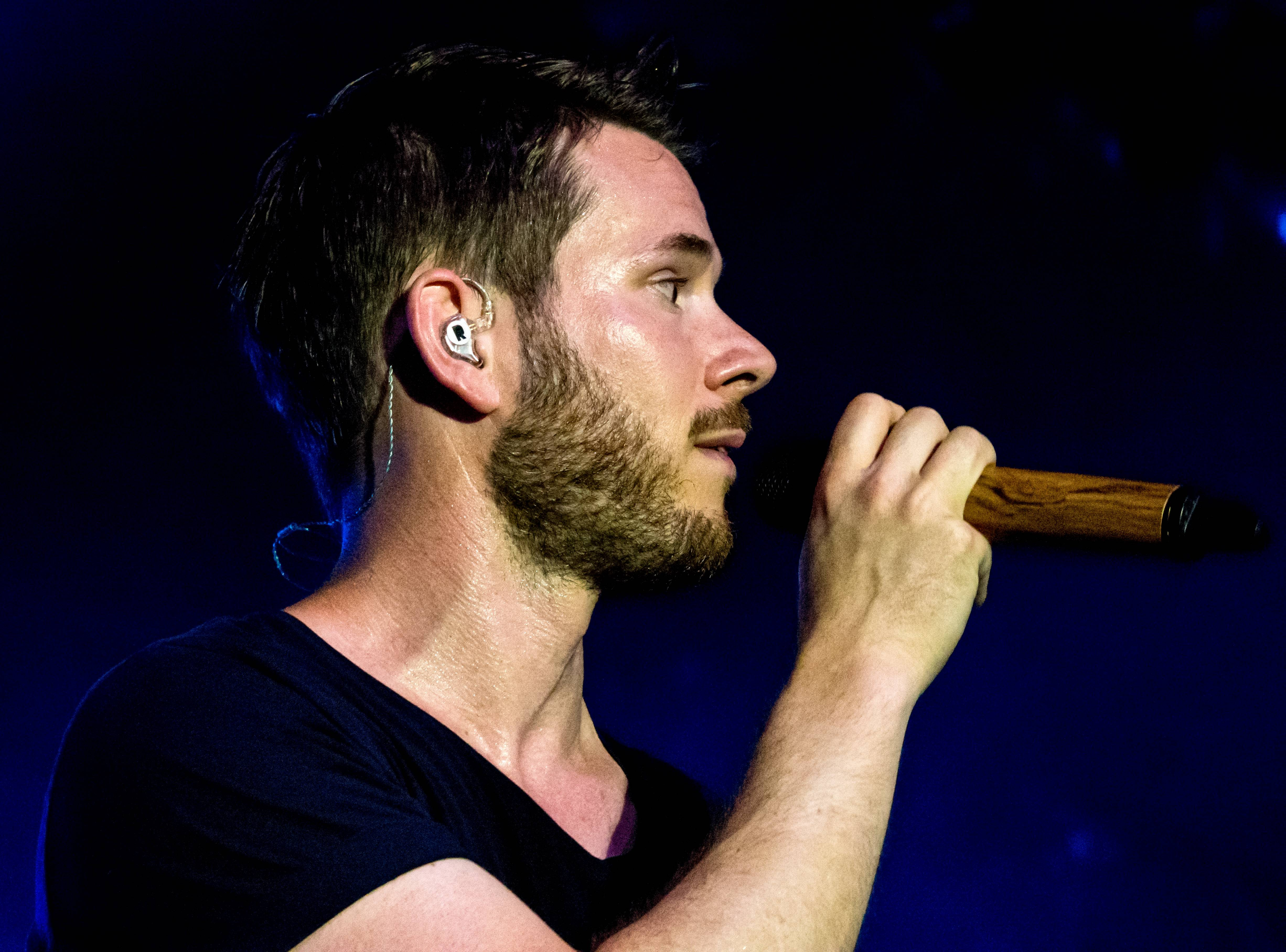
Johannes Strate at Zelt-Musik-Festival 2015

Revolverheld began their career as a supporting act for Donots, Silbermond and Udo Lindenberg. They first started gathering public attention with their song "Rock n' Roll", which then led to a Coaching Program in the Pop-Academy Baden-Württemberg. Then in 2004 they were signed by the record label Sony BMG. Their first single called "Generation Rock" was released in June 2005 and directly entered the German Charts. The song is featured on the video game Guitar Hero III: Legends of Rock. Together with the producer Clemens Matznick their first album (Revolverheld) was produced, and came out in September 2005.

On 7 July 2007, the band performed at the German leg of Live Earth in Hamburg.

"Helden 2008" was recorded as a dedication to UEFA Euro 2008. The single features a music video of the band members dressed as team members, with cut scenes of them performing in the locker room showers. By the success of the song, "Helden 2008" was the 34th best-selling song of 2008 in Germany.

On 30 November 2012, Revolverheld announced on their website that Florian Speer had left the band and has been replaced by Chris Rodriguez.

== Discography ==
=== Studio albums ===
List of albums, with selected chart positions, sales figures and certifications
Title	Album details	Peak chart positions			Certifications
Title	Album details	GER	AUT	SWI	Certifications
Revolverheld	Released: 23 September 2005; Label: Sony BMG; Format: CD, digital download	7	27	—	BVMI: Platinum
Chaostheorie	Released: 25 May 2007; Label: Sony BMG; Format: CD, digital download	3	17	—	
In Farbe	Released: 12 March 2010; Label: Sony; Format: CD, digital download	6	24	—	BVMI: Gold
Immer in Bewegung	Released: 20 September 2013; Label: Sony; Format: CD, digital download	9	3	82	BVMI: 3× Gold; IFPI AUT: Gold
Zimmer mit Blick	Released: 13 April 2018; Label: Sony; Format: CD, digital download	2	3	15	BVMI: Gold
Neu erzählen	Released: 8 October 2021; Label: Sony; Format: CD, digital download	2	—	—	
"—" denotes items that did not chart or were not released.

=== Singles ===
List of singles, with selected chart positions
Year	Title	Peak chart positions					Certifications	Album
Year	Title	GER	AUT	SWI	EUR	World Top 100	Certifications	Album
2005	"Generation Rock"	58	—	—	—	—		Revolverheld
2005	"Die Welt steht still"	16	44	—	88	78		Revolverheld
2006	"Freunde bleiben"	14	13	51	—	80		Revolverheld
2006	"Mit dir chilln"	17	27	—	—	—		Revolverheld
2007	"Ich werd' die Welt verändern"	21	68	—	—	—		Chaostheorie
2007	"Du explodierst"	70	—	—	—	—		Chaostheorie
2007	"Unzertrennlich"	45	—	—	—	—		Chaostheorie
2008	"Helden 2008"	2	57	—	—	—		Non-album single
2010	"Spinner"	13	69	—	—	52		In Farbe
2010	"Keine Liebeslieder"	74	—	—	—	—		In Farbe
2010	"Halt dich an mir fest" (featuring Marta Jandová)	8	21	40	100	37	BVMI: Platinum	In Farbe
2013	"Das kann uns keiner nehmen"	10	51	—	86	39	BVMI: Gold	Immer in Bewegung
2014	"Ich lass für dich das Licht an"	7	3	48	42	39	BVMI: Platinum; IFPI AUT: Gold	Immer in Bewegung
2014	"Lass uns gehen"	4	39	—	63	36	BVMI: Gold	Immer in Bewegung
2015	"Deine Nähe tut mir weh"	88	—	—	—	—		Immer in Bewegung
2015	"Darf ich bitten" (featuring Das Bo)	—	—	—	—	—		
2017	"Das Herz schlägt bis zum Hals"	—	—	—	—	—		Zimmer mit Blick
2018	"Immer noch fühlen"	95	—	—	—	—		Zimmer mit Blick
2018	"Zimmer mit Blick"	—	—	—	—	—		Zimmer mit Blick
2018	"Liebe auf Distanz" (featuring Antje Schomaker)	—	—	—	—	—		
2019	"So wie jetzt"	—	—	—	—	—		Zimmer mit Blick
2019	"Ich kann nicht aufhören unser Leben zu lieben"	—	—	—	—	—		Zimmer mit Blick
2019	"Unsere Geschichte ist erzählt"	—	—	—	—	—		Zimmer mit Blick
2020	"Leichter"	—	—	—	—	—		Neu erzählen
2021	"Abreißen"	—	—	—	—	—		Neu erzählen
2021	"Neu erzählen"	—	—	—	—	—		Neu erzählen
2024	"Alors on danse"	—	—	—	—	—		Non-album single
"—" denotes releases that did not chart or were not released in that country.

== Awards and certifications ==
1. Eins Live Krone – Best Newcomer (2006)
2. Platin-Schallplatte (Platinum Record) – Platinum for "Revolverheld" (LP) (2013)
3. Platin-Schallplatte (Platinum Record) – Platinum for "Halt dich an mir fest" (Single) (2015)
4. Echo – Best National Rock/Pop Band for Immer in Bewegung (2015)
