= On the Reeperbahn at Half Past Midnight (1954 film) =

1954 film

- Directed by: Wolfgang Liebeneiner
- Written by: Curt J. Braun; Gustav Kampendonk
- Produced by: Karl Mitschke; Kurt Ulrich; Heinz Willeg
- Starring: Hans Albers; Heinz Rühmann; Fita Benkhoff; Erwin Strahl
- Cinematography: Kurt Schulz
- Edited by: Ingrid Wacker
- Music by: Herbert Trantow
- Production company: Berolina Film
- Distributed by: Herzog Film
- Release date: 16 December 1954
- Running time: 105 minutes
- Country: West Germany
- Language: German

On the Reeperbahn at Half Past Midnight (German: Auf der Reeperbahn nachts um halb eins) is a 1954 West German comedy drama film directed by Wolfgang Liebeneiner and starring Hans Albers, Heinz Rühmann and Fita Benkhoff. The film is set in Hamburg and was one of two 1950s films starring Albers attempting to emulate the success of his 1944 hit Große Freiheit Nr. 7. The film takes its name from the 1912 song of the same name and is not a remake of the 1929 silent film of the same title. A further version was made in 1969 with Curd Jürgens.

It was shot at the Tempelhof Studios in West Berlin and on location around Hamburg, including St. Pauli and Cuxhaven as well as on Heligoland. The film's sets were designed by the art directors Willi Herrmann and Heinrich Weidemann.

== Synopsis ==
After many years away sailor Hannes Wedderkamp returns to his home city of Hamburg and meets up with his old friend Pittes Breuer who owns a venue on the Reeperbahn. Currently struggling, Hannes helps him turn it around by introducing a new revue. He also takes a kindly interest in his friend's grown-up daughter, only to discover that she is in fact really his own child who has been brought up by Pittes. When the two men fall out shortly afterwards, Pittes gets mixed up with an unscrupulous con man and Hannes pulls out all the stops to save him.

== Cast ==
- Hans Albers as Hannes Wedderkamp
- Heinz Rühmann as Pittes Breuer
- Fita Benkhoff as Luise
- Erwin Strahl as Bilek
- Sybil Werden as Marion
- Gustav Knuth as Brandstetter snr.
- Fritz Wagner as Kattmann
- Helga Franck as Anni
- Jürgen Graf as Jürgen Brandstetter
- Wolfgang Neuss as Nigrantz
- Else Reval as Die stramme Emma
- Liselotte Malkowsky as Singer
- Carl Hinrichs as Bootsmann Jan
- Wulf Rittscher as Herr Ettmann
- Wolfgang Müller as Matrose
- Al Hoosmann as Ein Gast
- George André Martin as Hausknecht Smittie
- Michael Piel as Tänzer
- Marion Soremba as Singer
