= On the Reeperbahn at Half Past Midnight (1929 film) =

1929 film

- Directed by: Fred Stranz
- Written by: Oskar Schubert-Stevens; Julius Urgiß
- Produced by: Max W. Kimmich
- Starring: Eddie Polo; Lydia Potechina; Harry Nestor; Inge Borg
- Cinematography: Akos Farkas; Franz Weihmayr
- Production company: Deutsche Universal-Film
- Distributed by: Deutsche Universal-Film
- Release date: 12 April 1929
- Running time: 71 minutes
- Country: Germany
- Languages: Silent; German intertitles

On the Reeperbahn at Half Past Midnight (German: Auf der Reeperbahn nachts um halb eins) is a 1929 German silent adventure film directed by Fred Stranz and starring Eddie Polo, Lydia Potechina, and Harry Nestor. The film takes its name from the 1912 song of the same name, which refers to the Reeperbahn in Hamburg. It was shot at the Johannisthal Studios in Berlin. The film's sets were designed by the art director Otto Moldenhauer. It was made by the German subsidiary of the Hollywood studio Universal Pictures.

== Cast ==
- Eddie Polo as Heini Box
- Lydia Potechina as Donna Ramona Raffkaela
- Harry Nestor as Caesar Verkannto
- Inge Borg as Signorina Eleonora Raffkaela
- Inge Rana
- Lotte Roman
- Heddy Warton

== Bibliography ==
- Waldman, Harry (2008). Nazi Films in America, 1933–1942. Jefferson, NC: McFarland. ISBN 978-0-7864-3861-7.
