= In Farbe =

Studio album by Revolverheld
- Released: 12 March 2010
- Genre: Alternative rock; pop rock
- Length: 42:08
- Language: German
- Label: Sony BMG

Revolverheld chronology
Chaostheorie (2007)	In Farbe (2010)	Immer in Bewegung (2013)

In Farbe (English: In Color) is the third studio album by German band Revolverheld. Released by Sony BMG on 12 March 2010 in German-speaking Europe, it peaked at number six on the German Albums Chart and was eventually certified gold by the Bundesverband Musikindustrie (BVMI). In Farbe produced three singles, including top ten hit "Halt dich an mir fest" featuring Die Happy singer Marta Jandová.

== Track listing ==
In Farbe – Standard edition
No.	Title	Length
1.	"Ich werde nie erwachsen"	3:19
2.	"Spinner"	3:13
3.	"Mein Leben ist super"	3:21
4.	"Halt dich an mir fest"	3:56
5.	"Immer einen Grund zu feiern"	2:50
6.	"Alles anders"	3:20
7.	"Darf ich bitten"	3:28
8.	"Keine Liebeslieder"	3:24
9.	"Alles wird gut"	3:00
10.	"Die Liebe liebt mich nicht"	3:28
11.	"Laute Menschen"	2:55
12.	"Um unser Leben"	2:23
13.	"Hamburg hinter uns"	3:15

In Farbe – Re-edition bonus track
No.	Title	Length
14.	"Halt dich an mir fest" (featuring Marta Jandová)	3:56

== Charts ==
Chart (2010)	Peak position
Austrian Albums (Ö3 Austria)	24
German Albums (Offizielle Top 100)	6

== Certifications ==
Region	Certification	Certified units/sales
Germany (BVMI)	Gold	100,000^{^}
^{^} Shipments figures based on certification alone.
