= Under the Red Lantern of St. Pauli =

Song
- Language: German

"Under the Red Lantern of St. Pauli" (in German: "Unter der roten Laterne von St. Pauli") is a German tango song of the 1940s.

The song was composed by Ralph Maria Siegel and lyrics had written by Günther Schwenn and Peter Schaeffers. Sven-Olof Sandberg was the first singer to record it on Odeon Records in 1941.

Lale Andersen, Peter Kraus and Lolita and are amongst those who have recorded it. It refers to the St. Pauli district of Hamburg, the port city's red light district.

In a 1949 review Billboard magazine described it as "a mightily pleasant serenade".
