= Heidi Kabel =

German actress and musician

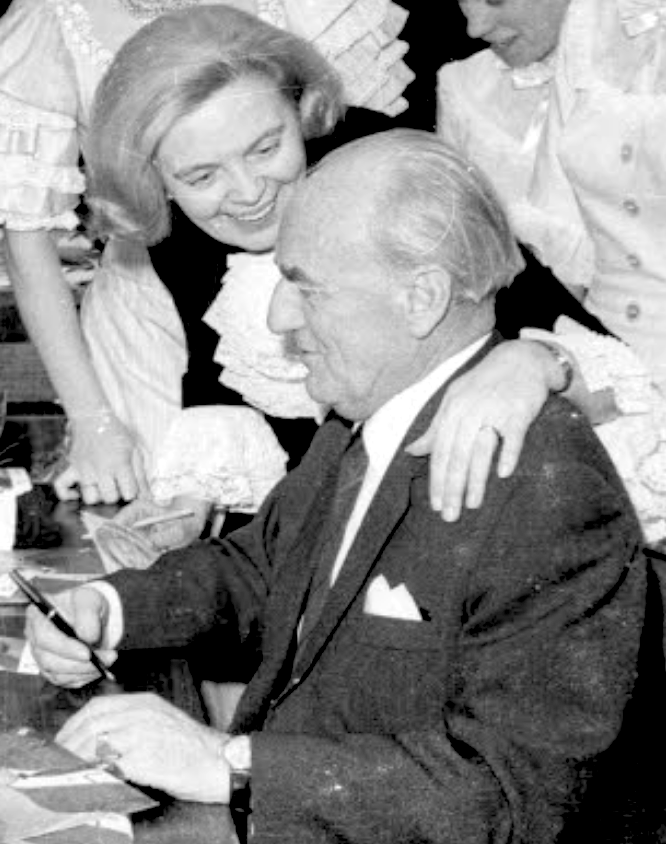
- Kabel in 1984
- Born: Heidi Bertha Auguste Kabel; 27 August 1914; Hamburg, Germany
- Died: 15 June 2010 (aged 95); Hamburg, Germany
- Occupations: Actress; Musician
- Years active: 1932–2007
- Spouse(s): Hans Mahler (1937–1970) (his death)
- Children: Heidi Mahler

Signature
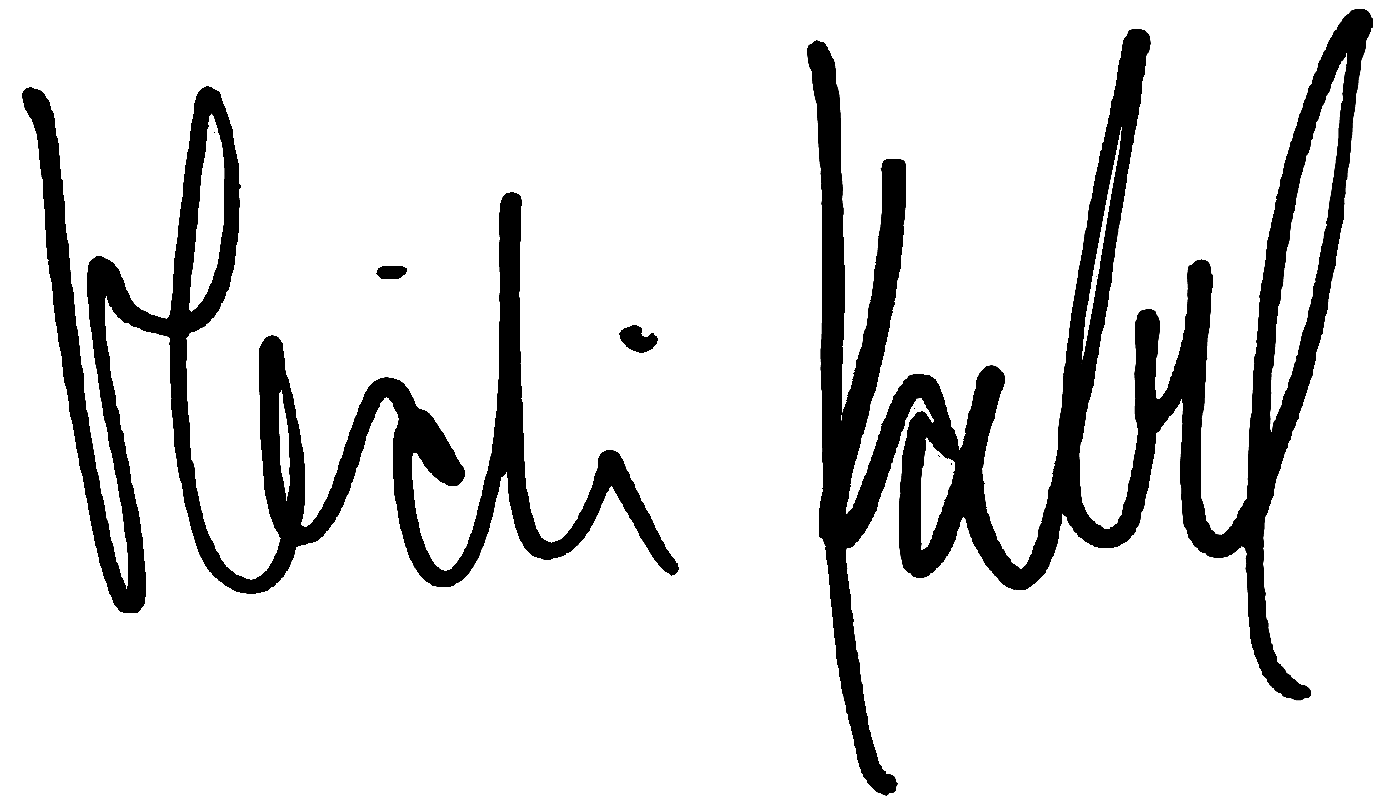

Heidi Bertha Auguste Kabel (German: [ˈhaɪdiː ˈkaːbl̩]; 27 August 1914 – 15 June 2010) was a German actress and musician. Most of her stage roles were performed at the Ohnsorg-Theater in Hamburg, many of them in Low German. She became famous in Germany as many of the productions of the Ohnsorg Theater were transmitted on German television.

Heidi Kabel was born in Hamburg; the city and its landmarks inspired many of her best-known songs (In Hamburg sagt man Tschüss, Jungfernstiegmarsch). She was married to stage director and actor Hans Mahler, who died in 1970. Their daughter, Heidi Mahler, is also an actress.

She died in Hamburg on 15 June 2010 at the age of 95 and was honoured with a funeral service at St. Michael's Church ten days later.

== Honors ==
- Bambi Award 1984, 1990, 2004
- Biermann-Ratjen-Medaille, Hamburg 1984
- Bürgermeister-Stolten-Medaille for art and science, Hamburg 1981
- Edelweiß of the magazine "Frau im Spiegel" 1993
- Ehrenkommissarin of the Hamburg Police 1994
- Honour medal for art and science, Hamburg 1989
- Goldene Kamera 1985
- Goldener Bildschirm 1967, 1972
- Hermann-Löns-Medaille in platin for special services to the Volksmusik 1989
- Richard-Ohnsorg-Preis 1983
- Silberne Maske of the Hamburger Volksbühne 1982
- Silbernes Blatt of the Dramatiker-Union 1986

She did not accept the Order of Merit of the Federal Republic of Germany, honouring an old Hanseatic tradition.

== Selected filmography ==
- A Girl Goes Ashore (1938)
- Wenn man Meyer heißt (1958, TV film)
- The Girl with the Cat's Eyes (1958)
- Wenn der Hahn kräht (1959, TV film)
- Das Herrschaftskind (1959, TV film)
- Tratsch im Treppenhaus (1962, TV film)
- Der Bürgermeisterstuhl (1962, TV film)
- Vater Philipp (1963, TV film)
- Mutter steht ihren Mann (1963, TV film)
- Kein Auskommen mit dem Einkommen (1966, TV film)
- Tratsch im Treppenhaus (1966, TV film)
- Und oben wohnen Engels (1967, TV film)
- Hein Butendörp sien Bestmann (1967, TV film)
- Verteufelte Zeiten (1968, TV film)
- Die Kartenlegerin (1968, TV film)
- Die lieben Verwandten (1968, TV film)
- Schneider Nörig (1969, TV film)
- On the Reeperbahn at Half Past Midnight (1969)
- Der Bürgermeisterstuhl (1969, TV film)
- Twenty Girls and the Teachers (1971)
- Mein Mann, der fährt zur See (1971, TV film)
- Der möblierte Herr (1971, TV film)
- Das Herrschaftskind (1972, TV film)
- Zwei Engel (1972, TV film)
- The Heath Is Green (1972)
- Rund um Kap Hoorn (1973, TV film)
- Für die Katz (1974, TV film)
- Der schönste Mann von der Reeperbahn (1974, TV film)
- Mutter Griepsch mischt mit (1975, TV film)
- Frau Pieper lebt gefährlich (1975, TV film)
- Frauen an Bord (1976, TV film)
- Wenn der Hahn kräht (1976, TV film)
- Die Chefin (1976, TV film)
- Die Venus von Müggensack (1977, TV film)
- Willems Vermächtnis (1978, TV film)
- Wenn du Geld hast (1978, TV film)
- Ein Mann mit Charakter (1979, TV film)
- Lotte spielt Lotto (1980, TV film)
- Mutter ist die Beste (1981, TV film)
- Das Kuckucksei (1981, TV film)
- Verteufelte Zeiten (1982, TV film)
- Der Sonne entgegen (1985, TV series)
- Tatort: Pleitegeier (1988, TV series episode)
- Mutter und Söhne (1992, TV film)
- Manda Voss wird 106 (1993, TV film)
- Theaterdonner (1995, TV film)
- Hands off Mississippi (2007)
