= Abschlach! =

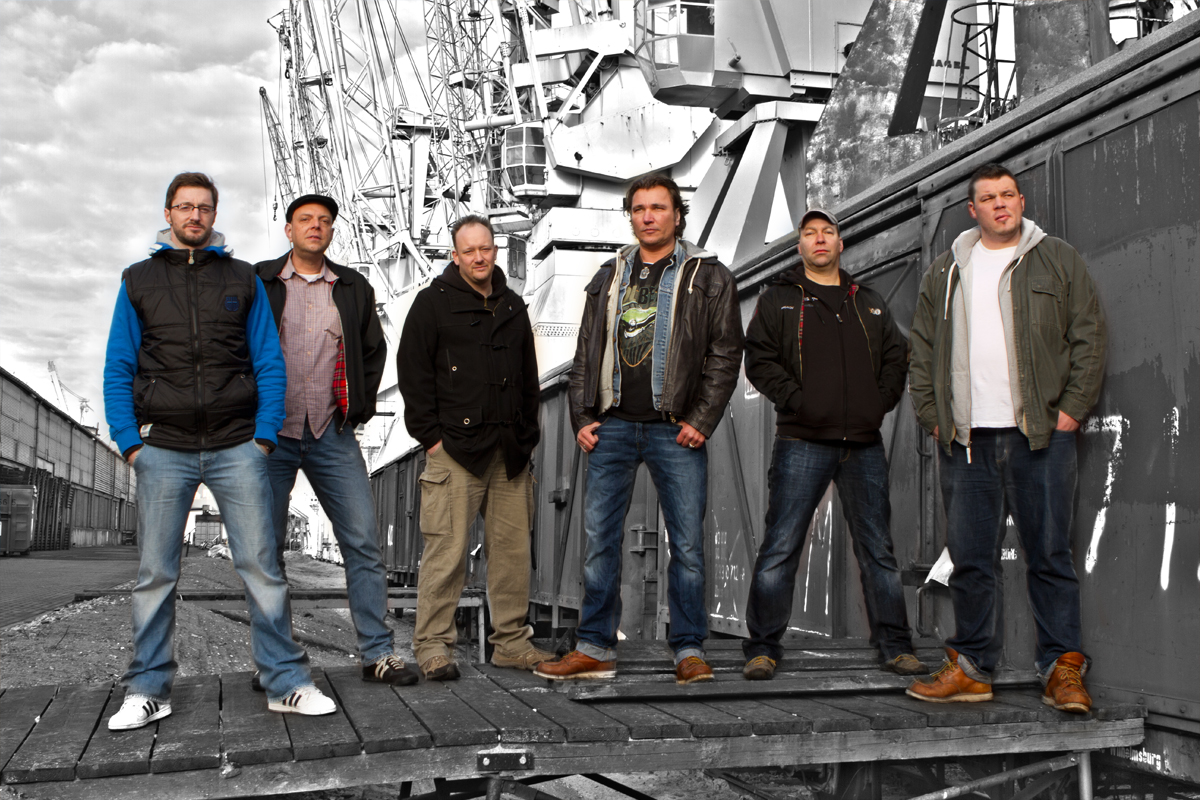

Background information
- Origin: Hamburg, Germany
- Genres: Rock, Punk, Ska
- Years active: 1994–present
- Members: Michael Wendt; Jan-Michel „Muchel“ Deutsch; Boris Krohn; Domi; Sven; Tobias Heilmann
- Past members: Joachim Eybe; Henning „Dülsen“ Trolsen; Jan Däumling; Tom Einecke
- Website: www.abschlach.de

Abschlach! is a rock band from Hamburg, Germany, whose music mainly focuses on their hometown Hamburg and the local football club Hamburger SV. "Abschlach!" refers on the one hand to the tee off in football, on the other hand to the tee off (shake hands) with the fans.

== Style ==
The band plays punk rock with English influences and German lyrics. With the second album, metal riffs were added in addition to ska and reggae influences.

== Topics ==
Mainly treats Abschlach! topics such as football and everything that goes with it, but also socio-critical texts or songs about their hometown of Hamburg are part of the lyrics. They rarely address political issues. In the song Abgelehnt from the album Freunde they take a stand against any kind of extremism without positioning themselves in any direction.

== Discography ==
=== Albums ===
- Ne’ einfache Band (2003, WMP/NMD)
- Runter ans Ufer (2005, WMP NMD)
- Freunde (2008, WMP/NMD)
- Du wirst uns siegen seh’n! (2012, WMP/NMD)
- Meist kommt’s anders (2015, WMP/Soulfood)
- Geile Zeit (2018, WMP/Soulfood)
- HSV! (2019, WMP/Soulfood)

=== Singles ===
- Mein Hamburg lieb ich sehr (2003; WMP/NMD)
- HSV Vereinshymne (2008; WMP/NMD, vom 1887-Shop, limitierte Auflage)
- Getrennt in den Farben (2013; WMP/Membran)
- Mein Hamburg lieb ich sehr (2016, WMP/Soulfood)
- HSV forever (2017 WMP/Soulfood)
- Oldschool HSV (2018 WMP/Believe)

== Charts ==
Album	Date	Peak position
Meist kommt's anders	9 October 2015	99
Geile Zeit	12 October 2018	26
