= On the Reeperbahn at Half Past Midnight (song) =

Song by Ralph Arthur Roberts

"Auf der Reeperbahn nachts um halb eins"
- 1946 single

Song by Hans Albers
- Language: German
- English title: On the Reeperbahn at Half Past Midnight
- A-side: "In Meinem Herzen, Schatz, Da Ist Für Viele Platz"
- Written: 1912
- Published: 1912
- Released: 1931
- Genre: Waltz
- Label: Odeon
- Songwriter: Ralph Arthur Roberts

"On the Reeperbahn at Half Past Midnight" (German:"Auf der Reeperbahn nachts um halb eins") is a 1912 German song by Ralph Arthur Roberts, originally written for a musical revue. The song refers to the Reeperbahn, the red light district of the port city of Hamburg. The song's popularity received a major boost when it was used in the 1944 film Große Freiheit Nr. 7, sung by the star Hans Albers.

== Overview ==
Three films have taken their title from the song, including On the Reeperbahn at Half Past Midnight (1954), a film starring Albers which attempted to repeat the success of his earlier hit. The tune was used for Billy Wilder's Witness for the Prosecution (1957), sung by Marlene Dietrich with new English lyrics as "I May Never Go Home Anymore".

The song is popular with fans of the Hamburg football club St. Pauli. The song has been parodied numerous times including Mike Krüger's On the Autobahn at Half Past Midnight (Auf der Autobahn nachts um halb eins).

== See also ==
- List of songs about Hamburg
