= 2021–22 2. Bundesliga =

48th season of the second-tier football league in Germany

2. Bundesliga
- Season: 2021–22
- Dates: 23 July 2021 – 15 May 2022
- Champions: Schalke 04
- Promoted: Schalke 04; Werder Bremen
- Relegated: Dynamo Dresden (via play-off); Erzgebirge Aue; FC Ingolstadt
- Matches: 306
- Goals: 892 (2.92 per match)
- Top goalscorer: Simon Terodde (30 goals)
- Biggest home win: Darmstadt 6–0 Aue
- Biggest away win: Sandhausen 1–6 Darmstadt; Aue 0–5 Schalke; Nürnberg 0–5 Ingolstadt; Darmstadt 0–5 Hamburg
- Highest scoring: Darmstadt 6–1 Ingolstadt; Sandhausen 1–6 Darmstadt; Schalke 5–2 Sandhausen; Paderborn 3–4 Bremen; Kiel 3–4 Paderborn; Schalke 3–4 Rostock
- Longest winning run: 7 games Bremen
- Longest unbeaten run: 12 games Hamburg
- Longest winless run: 17 games Dresden
- Longest losing run: 5 games Dresden
- Attendance: 4,169,344 (13,625 per match) (Note: Due to the COVID-19 pandemic in Germany, each local health department allows a different number of spectators.)

The 2021–22 2. Bundesliga was the 48th season of the 2. Bundesliga. It began on 23 July 2021 and concluded on 15 May 2022.

The fixtures were announced on 25 June 2021.

== Teams ==
Locations of the 2021–22 2. Bundesliga teams

=== Team changes ===
Promoted from 2020–21 3. Liga	Relegated from 2020–21 Bundesliga	Promoted to 2021–22 Bundesliga	Relegated to 2021–22 3. Liga
Dynamo Dresden; Hansa Rostock; FC Ingolstadt	Werder Bremen; Schalke 04	VfL Bochum; Greuther Fürth	VfL Osnabrück; Eintracht Braunschweig; Würzburger Kickers

=== Stadiums and locations ===
Team	Location	Stadium	Capacity
Erzgebirge Aue	Aue-Bad Schlema	Erzgebirgsstadion	15,711
Werder Bremen	Bremen	Wohninvest Weserstadion	42,100
Darmstadt 98	Darmstadt	Merck-Stadion am Böllenfalltor	17,000
Dynamo Dresden	Dresden	Rudolf-Harbig-Stadion	32,066
Fortuna Düsseldorf	Düsseldorf	Merkur Spiel-Arena	54,600
Hamburger SV	Hamburg	Volksparkstadion	57,000
Hannover 96	Hanover	HDI-Arena	49,000
1. FC Heidenheim	Heidenheim	Voith-Arena	15,000
FC Ingolstadt	Ingolstadt	Audi Sportpark	15,000
Karlsruher SC	Karlsruhe	BBBank Wildpark	29,699
Holstein Kiel	Kiel	Holstein-Stadion	15,034
1. FC Nürnberg	Nuremberg	Max-Morlock-Stadion	49,923
SC Paderborn	Paderborn	Benteler-Arena	15,000
Jahn Regensburg	Regensburg	Jahnstadion Regensburg	15,210
Hansa Rostock	Rostock	Ostseestadion	29,000
SV Sandhausen	Sandhausen	BWT-Stadion am Hardtwald	15,414
Schalke 04	Gelsenkirchen	Veltins-Arena	62,271
FC St. Pauli	Hamburg	Millerntor-Stadion	29,546

=== Personnel and kits ===
Team	Manager	Captain	Kit manufacturer	Shirt sponsor	
Team	Manager	Captain	Kit manufacturer	Front	Sleeve
Erzgebirge Aue	(Bulgaria) Pavel Dochev	(Germany) Martin Männel	Nike	WätaS Wärmetauscher Sachsen	Leonhardt Group
Werder Bremen	(Germany) Ole Werner	(Turkey) Ömer Toprak	Umbro	Wiesenhof	Ammerländer
Darmstadt 98	(Germany) Torsten Lieberknecht	(Germany) Fabian Holland	Craft	Software AG	Dialog Minds
Dynamo Dresden	(Germany) Guerino Capretti	(Germany) Sebastian Mai	Umbro	ALL-INKL.COM	AOK Plus
Fortuna Düsseldorf	(Germany) Daniel Thioune	(Poland) Adam Bodzek	Adidas	Henkel	Toyo Tires
Hamburger SV	(Germany) Tim Walter	(Germany) Sebastian Schonlau	Adidas	Orthomol	Popp Feinkost
Hannover 96	(Germany) Christoph Dabrowski	(Germany) Marcel Franke	Macron	BRAINHOUSE247	HDI
1. FC Heidenheim	(Germany) Frank Schmidt	(Germany) Patrick Mainka	Nike	MHP	Voith
FC Ingolstadt	(Germany) Rüdiger Rehm	(Germany) Stefan Kutschke	Puma	PROSIS	Audi Schanzer Fußballschule
Karlsruher SC	(Germany) Christian Eichner	(Germany) Jérôme Gondorf	Macron	GEM (H)/CG Elementum (A)	E.G.O. - Gruppe
Holstein Kiel	(Germany) Marcel Rapp	(Germany) Hauke Wahl	Puma	Famila	Lotto Schleswig-Holstein
1. FC Nürnberg	(Germany) Robert Klauß	(Germany) Enrico Valentini	Adidas	Nürnberger Versicherung	Exasol
SC Paderborn	(Poland) Lukas Kwasniok	(Germany) Ron Schallenberg	Saller	Bremer AG	sky Personal
Jahn Regensburg	(Bosnia and Herzegovina) Mersad Selimbegović	(Germany) Benedikt Gimber	Saller	Netto	Wolf GmbH
Hansa Rostock	(Germany) Jens Härtel	(Germany) Markus Kolke	Nike	Apex Group	SoftClean
SV Sandhausen	(Germany) Alois Schwartz	(Germany) Dennis Diekmeier	Macron	Layenberger	Office Mix
Schalke 04	(Germany) Mike Büskens	(Germany) Danny Latza	Umbro	Vivawest (Note: Gazprom was the main shirt sponsor until 24 February 2022, when their logo was replaced by the words "Schalke 04" on the team's shirts in response to the Russian invasion of Ukraine; the sponsorship deal was terminated on 28 February 2022. Vivawest was announced as the new main shirt sponsor on 5 March 2022.)	Harfid
FC St. Pauli	(Germany) Timo Schultz	(Germany) Philipp Ziereis	DIIY	Congstar	Astra Brauerei

=== Managerial changes ===
Team	Outgoing	Manner	Exit date		Position in table	Incoming	Incoming date		Ref.
Team	Outgoing	Manner	Announced on	Departed on	Position in table	Incoming	Announced on	Arrived on	Ref.
SC Paderborn	(Germany) Steffen Baumgart	End of contract	8 April 2021	30 June 2021	Pre-season	(Poland) Lukas Kwasniok	17 May 2021	1 July 2021	
Hannover 96	(Turkey) Kenan Koçak	Mutual consent	28 April 2021	30 June 2021	Pre-season	(Germany) Jan Zimmermann	10 May 2021	1 July 2021	
Hamburger SV	(Germany) Horst Hrubesch (interim)	End of caretaker spell	3 May 2021	30 June 2021	Pre-season	(Germany) Tim Walter	25 May 2021	1 July 2021	
Werder Bremen	(Germany) Thomas Schaaf	End of caretaker spell	16 May 2021	30 June 2021	Pre-season	(Germany) Markus Anfang	1 June 2021	1 July 2021	
Fortuna Düsseldorf	(Germany) Uwe Rösler	End of contract	24 May 2021	30 June 2021	Pre-season	(Germany) Christian Preußer	27 May 2021	1 July 2021	
Erzgebirge Aue	(Germany) Dirk Schuster	Mutual consent	28 May 2021	30 June 2021	Pre-season	(Belarus) Aleksey Shpilevsky	7 June 2021	1 July 2021	
Darmstadt 98	(Germany) Markus Anfang	Signed for Werder Bremen	1 June 2021	30 June 2021	Pre-season	(Germany) Torsten Lieberknecht	8 June 2021	1 July 2021	
FC Ingolstadt	(Germany) Tomas Oral	End of contract	2 June 2021	30 June 2021	Pre-season	(Germany) Roberto Pätzold	6 June 2021	1 July 2021	
Erzgebirge Aue	(Belarus) Aleksey Shpilevsky	Sacked	19 September 2021		18th	(Germany) Marc Hensel / (Germany) Carsten Müller	21 September 2021		
Holstein Kiel	(Germany) Ole Werner	Resigned	20 September 2021		15th	(Germany) Dirk Bremser (interim)	20 September 2021		
SV Sandhausen	(Germany) Gerhard Kleppinger / (Austria) Stefan Kulovits	Sacked	21 September 2021		16th	(Germany) Alois Schwartz	22 September 2021		
FC Ingolstadt	(Germany) Roberto Pätzold	Sacked	26 September 2021		17th	(Germany) André Schubert	26 September 2021		
Holstein Kiel	(Germany) Dirk Bremser (interim)	End of caretaker spell	1 October 2021		14th	(Germany) Marcel Rapp	1 October 2021		
Werder Bremen	(Germany) Markus Anfang	Resigned	20 November 2021		8th	(Austria) Danijel Zenković (interim)	20 November 2021		
Werder Bremen	(Austria) Danijel Zenković (interim)	End of caretaker spell	28 November 2021		10th	(Germany) Ole Werner	28 November 2021		
Hannover 96	(Germany) Jan Zimmermann	Sacked	29 November 2021		16th	(Germany) Christoph Dabrowski (Note: Dabrowski was initially appointed as interim coach, but the move was made permanent on 21 December 2021.)	1 December 2021		
FC Ingolstadt	(Germany) André Schubert	Sacked	8 December 2021		18th	(Germany) Rüdiger Rehm	8 December 2021		
Fortuna Düsseldorf	(Germany) Christian Preußer	Sacked	8 February 2022		15th	(Germany) Daniel Thioune	8 February 2022		
Erzgebirge Aue	(Germany) Marc Hensel / (Germany) Carsten Müller	Stepping back in coaching team	23 February 2022		18th	(Bulgaria) Pavel Dochev	23 February 2022		
Dynamo Dresden	(Germany) Alexander Schmidt	Sacked	1 March 2022		14th	(Germany) Guerino Capretti	2 March 2022		
Schalke 04	(Greece) Dimitrios Grammozis	Sacked	6 March 2022		6th	(Germany) Mike Büskens	7 March 2022		

== League table ==
Pos	Team	Pld	W	D	L	GF	GA	GD	Pts	Promotion, qualification or relegation
1	Schalke 04 (C, P)	34	20	5	9	72	44	+28	65	Promotion to Bundesliga
2	Werder Bremen (P)	34	18	9	7	65	43	+22	63	Promotion to Bundesliga
3	Hamburger SV	34	16	12	6	67	35	+32	60	Qualification for promotion play-offs
4	Darmstadt 98	34	18	6	10	71	46	+25	60	
5	FC St. Pauli	34	16	9	9	61	46	+15	57	
6	1. FC Heidenheim	34	15	7	12	43	45	−2	52	
7	SC Paderborn	34	13	12	9	56	44	+12	51	
8	1. FC Nürnberg	34	14	9	11	49	49	0	51	
9	Holstein Kiel	34	12	9	13	46	54	−8	45	
10	Fortuna Düsseldorf	34	11	11	12	45	42	+3	44	
11	Hannover 96	34	11	9	14	35	49	−14	42	
12	Karlsruher SC	34	9	14	11	54	55	−1	41	
13	Hansa Rostock	34	10	11	13	41	52	−11	41	
14	SV Sandhausen	34	10	11	13	42	54	−12	41	
15	Jahn Regensburg	34	10	10	14	50	51	−1	40	
16	Dynamo Dresden (R)	34	7	11	16	33	46	−13	32	Qualification for relegation play-offs
17	Erzgebirge Aue (R)	34	6	8	20	32	72	−40	26	Relegation to 3. Liga
18	FC Ingolstadt (R)	34	4	9	21	30	65	−35	21	Relegation to 3. Liga

Source: DFB
Rules for classification: 1) Points; 2) Goal difference; 3) Goals scored; 4) Head-to-head points; 5) Head-to-head goal difference; 6) Head-to-head away goals scored; 7) Away goals scored; 8) Play-off.
(C) Champions; (P) Promoted; (R) Relegated

== Results ==
Home \ Away	AUE	BRE	DAR	DRE	DÜS	HAM	HAN	HEI	ING	KAR	KIE	NÜR	PAD	REG	ROS	SAN	SCH	STP
Erzgebirge Aue	—	0–3	1–2	0–1	0–1	1–1	1–3	2–0	1–0	0–3	2–3	1–3	1–4	1–0	2–2	1–3	0–5	0–0
Werder Bremen	4–0	—	1–0	2–1	3–0	0–2	1–1	3–0	1–1	2–1	2–3	1–1	1–4	2–0	3–0	1–1	1–1	1–1
Darmstadt 98	6–0	3–0	—	1–0	1–3	0–5	4–0	3–2	6–1	2–2	3–1	2–0	3–0	0–2	1–1	1–1	2–5	4–0
Dynamo Dresden	0–1	3–0	0–1	—	1–0	1–1	2–0	1–1	3–0	3–1	0–0	0–1	0–3	1–1	1–4	0–1	1–2	1–1
Fortuna Düsseldorf	3–1	2–3	2–1	2–2	—	1–1	1–1	0–1	3–0	3–1	2–2	0–1	2–3	1–1	3–0	0–1	2–1	1–1
Hamburger SV	4–0	2–3	2–2	1–1	1–1	—	2–1	2–0	3–0	3–0	1–1	2–2	1–2	4–1	3–0	2–1	1–1	2–1
Hannover 96	1–1	1–4	2–2	0–0	0–0	1–0	—	1–0	3–2	2–0	2–0	0–3	0–0	1–1	0–3	1–2	0–1	1–0
1. FC Heidenheim	0–2	2–1	2–1	2–1	1–3	0–0	3–1	—	2–1	2–0	2–1	3–1	0–0	3–0	1–1	1–1	1–0	2–4
FC Ingolstadt	3–2	0–3	0–2	3–0	1–2	0–4	1–2	1–2	—	1–1	1–1	0–0	0–1	0–3	0–0	0–0	0–3	1–3
Karlsruher SC	2–1	0–0	3–0	2–2	2–2	1–1	4–0	3–2	2–2	—	2–2	4–1	2–4	1–1	2–2	0–2	1–1	1–3
Holstein Kiel	3–0	2–1	1–1	2–1	1–0	1–0	0–3	1–1	1–0	0–2	—	3–0	3–4	0–3	0–2	2–2	0–3	3–0
1. FC Nürnberg	0–0	1–2	3–1	1–1	2–0	2–1	0–0	4–0	0–5	2–1	2–1	—	1–2	2–0	1–0	2–4	1–2	2–3
SC Paderborn	3–3	3–4	0–1	0–0	1–1	1–2	3–0	1–2	2–1	2–2	1–2	2–2	—	1–1	1–1	2–0	0–1	3–1
Jahn Regensburg	3–2	2–3	0–2	3–1	0–0	2–4	3–1	0–2	1–1	2–2	1–2	2–2	1–0	—	2–3	3–0	4–1	2–3
Hansa Rostock	1–2	1–2	2–1	1–3	2–1	2–3	0–1	0–0	1–1	1–3	3–2	0–2	0–0	1–1	—	1–1	0–2	1–0
SV Sandhausen	2–0	2–2	1–6	2–1	0–2	1–1	3–1	1–3	0–2	0–0	3–1	1–2	1–1	0–3	0–1	—	1–2	1–1
Schalke 04	1–1	1–4	2–4	3–0	3–1	1–3	2–1	3–0	3–0	1–2	1–1	4–1	2–0	2–1	3–4	5–2	—	3–2
FC St. Pauli	2–2	1–1	1–2	3–0	2–0	3–2	0–3	1–0	4–1	3–1	3–0	1–1	2–2	2–0	4–0	3–1	2–1	—

Source: DFB
Legend: Blue = home team win; Yellow = draw; Red = away team win.

== Promotion/relegation play-offs ==
The promotion/relegation play-offs took place on 20 and 24 May 2022.

=== Overview ===
Team 1	Agg.	Team 2	1st leg	2nd leg
Dynamo Dresden	0–2	1. FC Kaiserslautern	0–0	0–2

=== Matches ===
All times Central European Summer Time (UTC+2)

20 May 2022
20:30

1. FC Kaiserslautern	0–0	Dynamo Dresden
	Report

Fritz-Walter-Stadion, Kaiserslautern
Attendance: 46,179
Referee: Felix Brych
24 May 2022
20:30

Dynamo Dresden	0–2	1. FC Kaiserslautern
	Report	Hanslik 59'; Hercher 90+2'

Rudolf-Harbig-Stadion, Dresden
Attendance: 30,530
Referee: Daniel Siebert

1. FC Kaiserslautern won 2–0 on aggregate

== Top scorers ==
Rank	Player	Club	Goals
1	(Germany) Simon Terodde	Schalke 04	30
2	(Germany) Robert Glatzel	Hamburger SV	22
3	(Germany) Marvin Ducksch	Hannover 96; Werder Bremen	21
4	(Germany) Niclas Füllkrug	Werder Bremen	19
4	(Germany) Philipp Hofmann	Karlsruher SC	19
6	(Austria) Guido Burgstaller	FC St. Pauli	18
7	(Germany) Luca Pfeiffer	Darmstadt 98	17
7	(Netherlands) John Verhoek	Hansa Rostock	17
9	(Germany) Phillip Tietz	Darmstadt 98	15
10	(Germany) Sven Michel	SC Paderborn	14

== Number of teams by state ==
Position	State	Number	Teams
1	Baden-Württemberg	3	1. FC Heidenheim, Karlsruher SC and SV Sandhausen
1	Bavaria	3	FC Ingolstadt 04, 1. FC Nürnberg and Jahn Regensburg
1	North Rhine-Westphalia	3	Schalke 04, Fortuna Düsseldorf and SC Paderborn
4	Hamburg	2	Hamburger SV and FC St. Pauli
4	Saxony	2	Erzgebirge Aue and Dynamo Dresden
6	Bremen	1	Werder Bremen
6	Hesse	1	Darmstadt 98
6	Lower Saxony	1	Hannover 96
6	Mecklenburg-Vorpommern	1	Hansa Rostock
6	Schleswig-Holstein	1	Holstein Kiel
