= Stefan Brink (jurist) =

German jurist

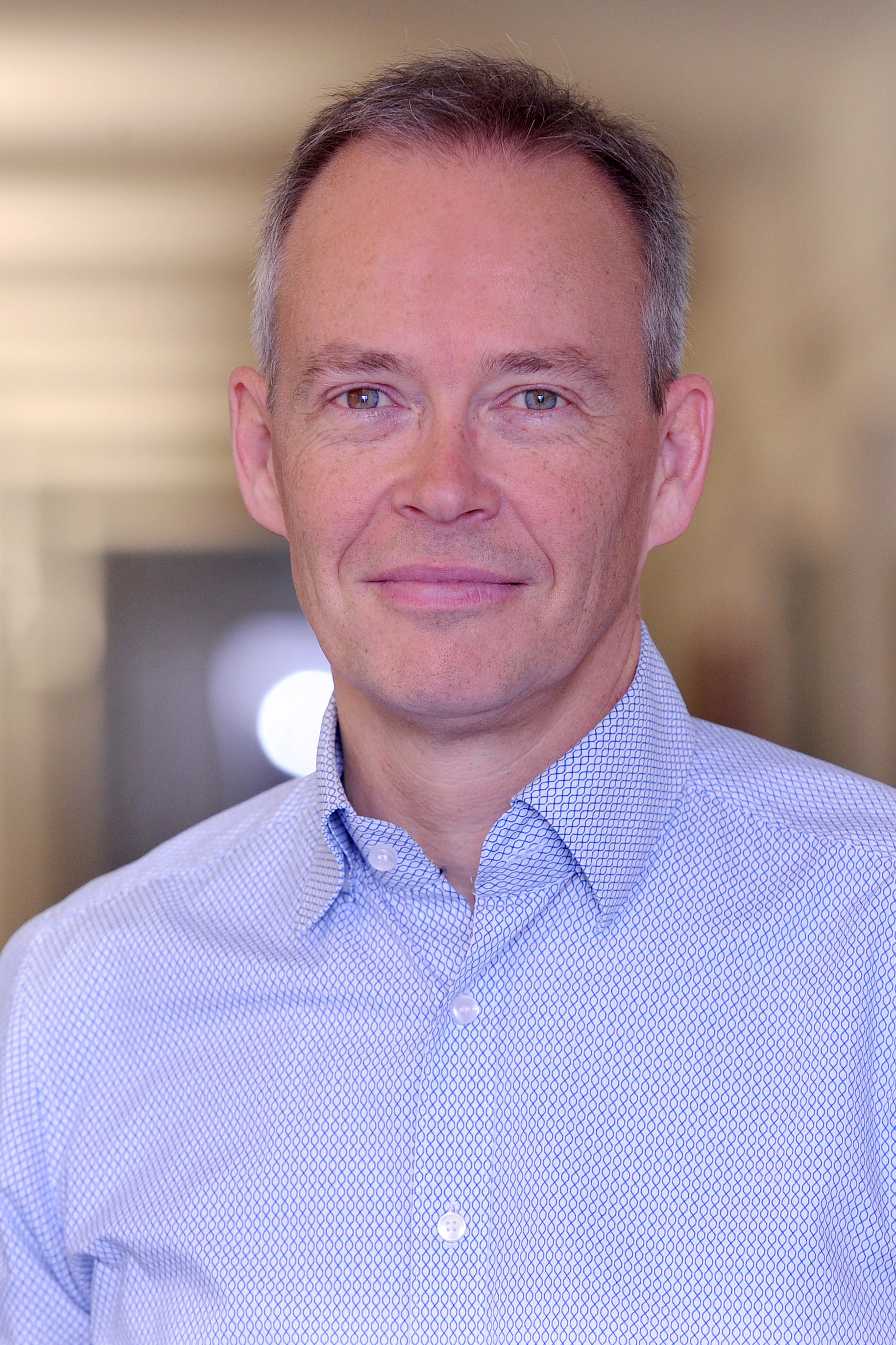
- Brink in 2016
- Born: 1966 (age 59–60); Kaiserslautern
- Education: German University of Administrative Sciences Speyer
- Known for: Work associated with "data protection"

Stefan Brink is a German jurist and former judge. He is a party member of the liberal FDP.

== Early life and education ==
Brink was born in 1966 in Kaiserslautern.

Brink studied law in Mainz, Heidelberg, Dijon, and Paris. He received his doctorate under Hans Herbert von Arnim at the German University of Administrative Sciences Speyer.

== Career ==
=== Rhineland-Palatinate ===
He worked for the state diet of Rhineland-Palatinate. (Note: Wissenschaftlicher Dienst des Landtags Rheinland-Pfalz) He later served as a judge at a court (Note: Verwaltungsgericht Koblenz) in Koblenz and as a research associate (Note: Wissenschaftlicher Mitarbeiter) at the Federal Constitutional Court. He then tenured as head of "private data protection" for the data protection officer of Rhineland-Palatinate, (Note: Leiter Privater Datenschutz beim Landesbeauftragten für den Datenschutz und die Informationsfreiheit in Rheinland-Pfalz) as well as deputy state commissioner for freedom of information in Rhineland-Palatinate. (Note: Stellvertretender Landesbeauftragter für die Informationsfreiheit Rheinland-Pfalz) He moved to Baden-Wurttemberg in 2008.

=== Baden-Wurttemberg ===
On the nomination of the Green Party, Brink was elected on 1 December 2016 by the state diet of Baden-Wurttemberg as data protection officer for Baden-Wurttemberg, (Note: Landesbeauftragter für den Datenschutz und die Informationsfreiheit Baden-Württemberg, i.e. state commissioner for data privacy and freedom of information for the state of Baden-Wurttemberg) receiving 108 of 125 votes. He assumed office on 1 January 2017.

Brink described the Strache video of the Ibiza affair as a "criminal wrongdoing".

During the COVID-19 pandemic he imposed a fine of more than €1.2 million on the health insurance provider AOK Baden-Wurttemberg over a "lack of regular monitoring and adjustment".

On 30 September 2020, he prohibited the continued maintenance of a list of "conspicuous" and criminal refugees and ordered the deletion of the data collected.

He concluded his term at the end of 2022.

== Personal life ==
He is married and has three daughters.
