= Gesundes Kinzigtal =

German healthcare company

Gesundes Kinzigtal is a health care management company in the German town of Hausach in the Black Forest. The name means "healthy Kinzig valley". The company is led by Dr. Madeleine Renyi.

== Structure ==
Gesundes Kinzigtal GmbH was founded by the network of physicians MQNK e.V. (Medizinischen QualitätsNetz Ärzteinitiative Kinzigtal e.V) and the healthcare management company OptiMedis AG based in Hamburg in 2005. Currently it is operated by the MQNK e.V. and the rGV Kinzigtal e.G. - a cooperative for the operation of medical care centers.

The idea of Gesundes Kinzigtal - the attempt to overcome the traditionally fragmented German health care system - has attracted international attention because it appears to have improved the health of the population and reduced demands on healthcare, when in most of the developed world trends are in the other direction. " If the evaluation of Gesundes Kinzigtal Integrated Care provides sufficient evidence of a significant improvement in effectiveness and/or efficiency of health services under conditions of a Kinzigtal type system, Gesundes Kinzigtal Integrated Care could become a role model for many similar regions in Germany."

== Integrated care ==
It operates a regional integrated care system. This population-based integrated care approach is unusual in Germany. It works with a major health insurance company, AOK Baden-Württemberg (the biggest health insurer in the region). Until 2022 the Sozialversicherung für Landwirtschaft, Forsten und Gartenbau (a specialist insurer which is only available to farmers and their families) was participating as well. Long-term contracts were agreed with the insurers for their insured populations, covering all age groups and care settings, at the beginning of the project. If the sickness funds spend less on health care than the population budget, Gesundes Kinzigtal shares the benefits.

== Programmes ==
The first programmes initiated in 2006 were a smoking prevention scheme, a program for patients with osteoporosis, and one for elderly people. It now offers gym vouchers, dance classes, glee clubs and aqua-aerobics courses to encourage people to stay active. There are health promotion programmes in schools and workplaces, and ‘patient university’ classes to offer health advice to support prevention and self-management. These are largely run by existing community organisations and local government agencies.

In October 2014 all members were offered two ten-euro Boomerang Vouchers. One was for their own use in the programme, the other to benefit a social institution in the region. 1400 members made use of it, and the organisation matched the funding so 26,000 euros were collected. The most popular beneficiary was Bärenkind in Hausach. Second place went to the Kindergarten St. Josef in Oberwolfach.

Clinicians are trained in shared decision-making so patients are actively involved in their own care when they do require input from health services. There are targeted programmes for high-risk population groups, such as older people, those living in nursing homes, people with long-term conditions, and people with high body mass index. There is a system-wide electronic health record so information about patients is available across providers. This enables effective co-ordination of care across different settings.

Consultations with doctors are longer. "my consultations changed from an eye wink to an average of 15 minutes,... it needs more time to explain to patients what I'm doing and why."

In 2016 there were also access to different sports and nutrition advice as well as screening programmes to reduce loneliness.

== Evaluation ==
Evaluation by independent research institutions was coordinated by a separate coordination agency, EKIV, in the department of medical sociology at Freiburg University. EKIV designs calls for tenders relating to research questions which have been agreed by the partners.

The agreed basic research questions:

- Does an integrated care system enhance patients’ self-management? Does it stimulate a shared decision-making of doctors and patients more than “normal care”?
- Does this system contribute to an increase in population health? Is such a system more effective than "normal care“?
- How satisfied are physicians and other providers with the integrated care system?
- Does the new integrated care system stimulate a more intensive interdisciplinary cooperation as compared with "normal care“?
- Is this system more efficient than normal care? If so, does the Kinzigtal system provide at least the same service quality as normal care?
- Does the new integrated care system lead to a better service quality and if so, does it increase service quality across all care sectors and health indications or only in a few sectors and/or indications?
- Does the new integrated care system contribute to reduce over-, under-, and misuse of health services which is a feature of Germany's health service system?

Evaluation by the PMV Research Group of the University of Cologne shows that this approach improves health outcomes and helps reduce health care costs. OptiMedis claims that the actual cost of the insured were almost 7% lower than expected costs. The researchers found a decline in over-, under- and misuse of healthcare in the region, and an increase in healthcare quality. Between 2006 and 2010, the project reduced costs by 16.9% against the population budget for members of one of the sickness funds, compared with a group of its members from a different region. This was chiefly because emergency hospital admissions only increased by 10.2% for patients in Kinzigtal, compared with the 33.1% increase in the comparator group.

Overall, by 2017, the project reported a reduction of 6% in healthcare expenditure compared with that expected for the population. .

A 10-year evaluation published in 2021 comparing Kinzigtal with 13 structurally comparable control regions found a difference in favor of Kinzigtal for six indicators, and a negative trend compared to the controls for seven indicators.

== Impact ==
OptiMedis AG has established a similar operation in Leiden, OptiMedis Nederland BV. The majority shareholder is Adstrat Consulting BV. This is also based on the Triple Aim approach advocated by Donald Berwick - better patient care, a healthier and happier population and thereby lower output increases for health insurance. In England the approach is being further developed by OptiMedis-COBIC UK.
