= Marcel Rapp =

German footballer and manager

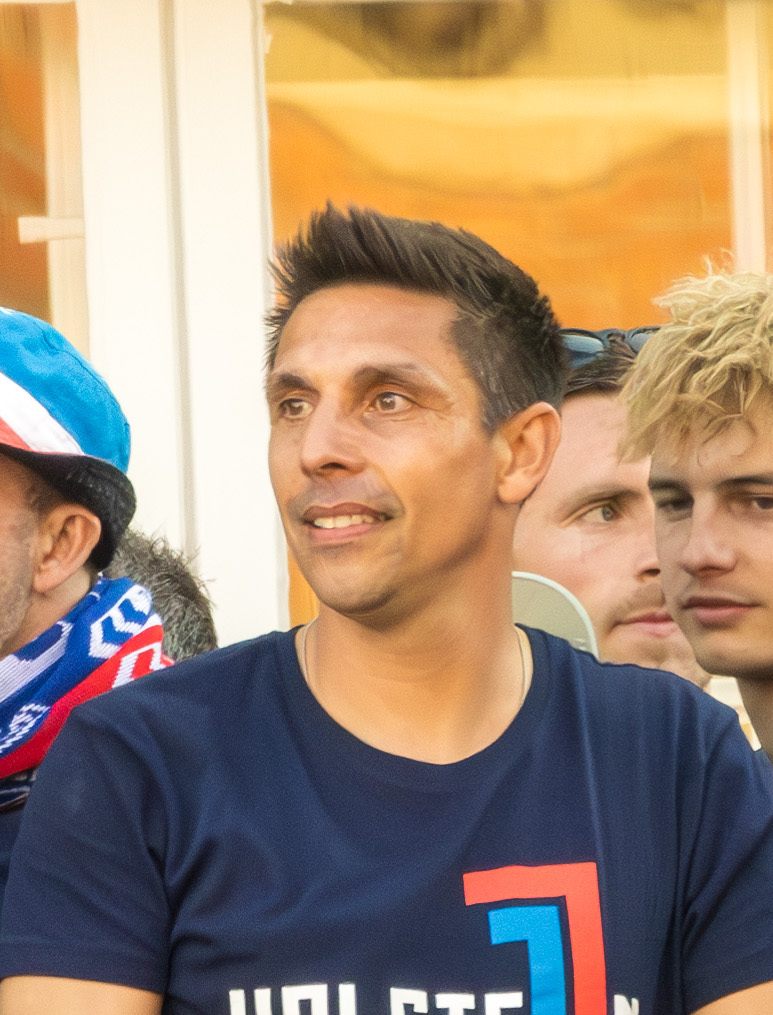
- Rapp after promotion with Holstein Kiel in 2024

Personal information
- Date of birth: 16 April 1979 (age 47)
- Place of birth: Pforzheim, West Germany
- Height: 1.78 m (5 ft 10 in)
- Positions: Centre-back; midfielder

Team information
- Current team: St. Pauli (head coach)

Youth career
- 1. FC Ersingen
- –1994: VfR Pforzheim
- 1994–1999: Karlsruher SC

Senior career*
Years	Team	Apps	(Gls)
1997–2000	Karlsruher SC II	54	(1)
1999–2000	Karlsruher SC	8	(0)
2000	Rot-Weiß Oberhausen	1	(0)
2000–2001	Carl Zeiss Jena	3	(0)
2001–2002	Karlsruher SC	0	(0)
2001–2002	Karlsruher SC II	13	(0)
2002–2007	SC Pfullendorf	160	(10)
2007–2011	Stuttgarter Kickers	92	(4)
2008–2011	Stuttgarter Kickers II	5	(0)
2011–2012	FC Nöttingen	45	(2)
Total		381	(17)

Managerial career
- 2020: 1899 Hoffenheim (caretaker)
- 2021–2026: Holstein Kiel
- 2026–: St. Pauli
- * Club domestic league appearances and goals

Marcel Rapp (born 16 April 1979) is a German former professional footballer who played as a centre-back or as a midfielder and is currently the head coach of 2. Bundesliga club St. Pauli.

== Career ==
=== Coaching career ===
Rapp began his coaching career as assistant coach at FC Nöttingen.

In January 2013, Rapp became assistant coach of TSG 1899 Hoffenheim's U17 squad under Jens Rasiejewski. In the 2013–14 season, he took over as head coach of the U16s and coached them for two seasons. In the 2015–16 season, Rapp became head coach of the U17s. In March 2017, Rapp took over the U19s from Domenico Tedesco, who moved to second-division club FC Erzgebirge Aue.

On 9 June 2020 Rapp, together with former assistant coach Matthias Kaltenbach and U16 coach Kai Herdling, took over Alfred Schreuder's Bundesliga-team, which was in 7th place with 43 points after the 30th matchday of the 2019/20 season. The club described the transitional arrangement as a "team solution." Although Rapp was the only person with a soccer coaching license, Kaltenbach was the official head coach. The coaching trio won 3 of their last 4 matches and finished the season in 6th place, qualifying directly for the Europa League. Rapp then returned to the U19s for the 2020–21 season.

At the beginning of October 2021, Rapp took over at second-division club Holstein Kiel as the successor to interim coach Dirk Bremser, who had been in charge of the team for 2 matches following the resignation of Ole Werner. He signed a contract until 30 June 2024. At the time of his takeover, Holstein Kiel were in 15th place with 8 points after 2 wins, 2 draws and 5 defeats on matchday 9 of the 2021–22 season. At the end of the season, they finished ninth in the table, followed by eighth place at the end of the following season.

In October 2023, Rapp extended his contract with Holstein Kiel until June 2026. On 11 May 2024, he steered the club to their inaugural promotion to the Bundesliga, clinching a top-two finish with a 1–1 draw against third-placed Fortuna Düsseldorf. He was sacked in February 2026. He was named the new head coach of FC St. Pauli for the 2026–27 season.

== Managerial statistics ==
As of match played 21 November 2026

Managerial record by team and tenure
Team	From	To	Record								Ref
Team	From	To	G	W	D	L	GF	GA	GD	Win %	Ref
1899 Hoffenheim (caretaker)	9 June 2020	30 June 2020	4	3	0	1	11	3	+8	75.00	
Holstein Kiel	4 October 2021	24 February 2026	160	59	38	63	250	266	−16	36.88	
St. Pauli	5 June 2026	Present	13	3	6	4	15	18	−3	23.08	
Total			177	65	44	68	276	287	−11	36.72	—
