= FC Ingolstadt 04 =

German football club, based in Ingolstadt

FC Ingolstadt
- Full name: Fußballclub Ingolstadt 04 e. V.
- Nickname: Die Schanzer
- Founded: 5 February 2004; 22 years ago
- Ground: Audi Sportpark
- Capacity: 15,200
- Chairman: Peter Jackwerth
- Head coach: Achim Beierlorzer
- League: 3. Liga
- 2025–26: 3. Liga, 12th of 20
- Website: www.fcingolstadt.de
Home colours	Away colours

Fußballclub Ingolstadt 04 e. V., commonly known as FC Ingolstadt 04 or FC Ingolstadt, is a German football club based in Ingolstadt, Bavaria. The club was founded in 2004 out of the merger of the football sides of two other clubs: ESV Ingolstadt-Ringsee 1919 and MTV Ingolstadt 1881.

== History ==
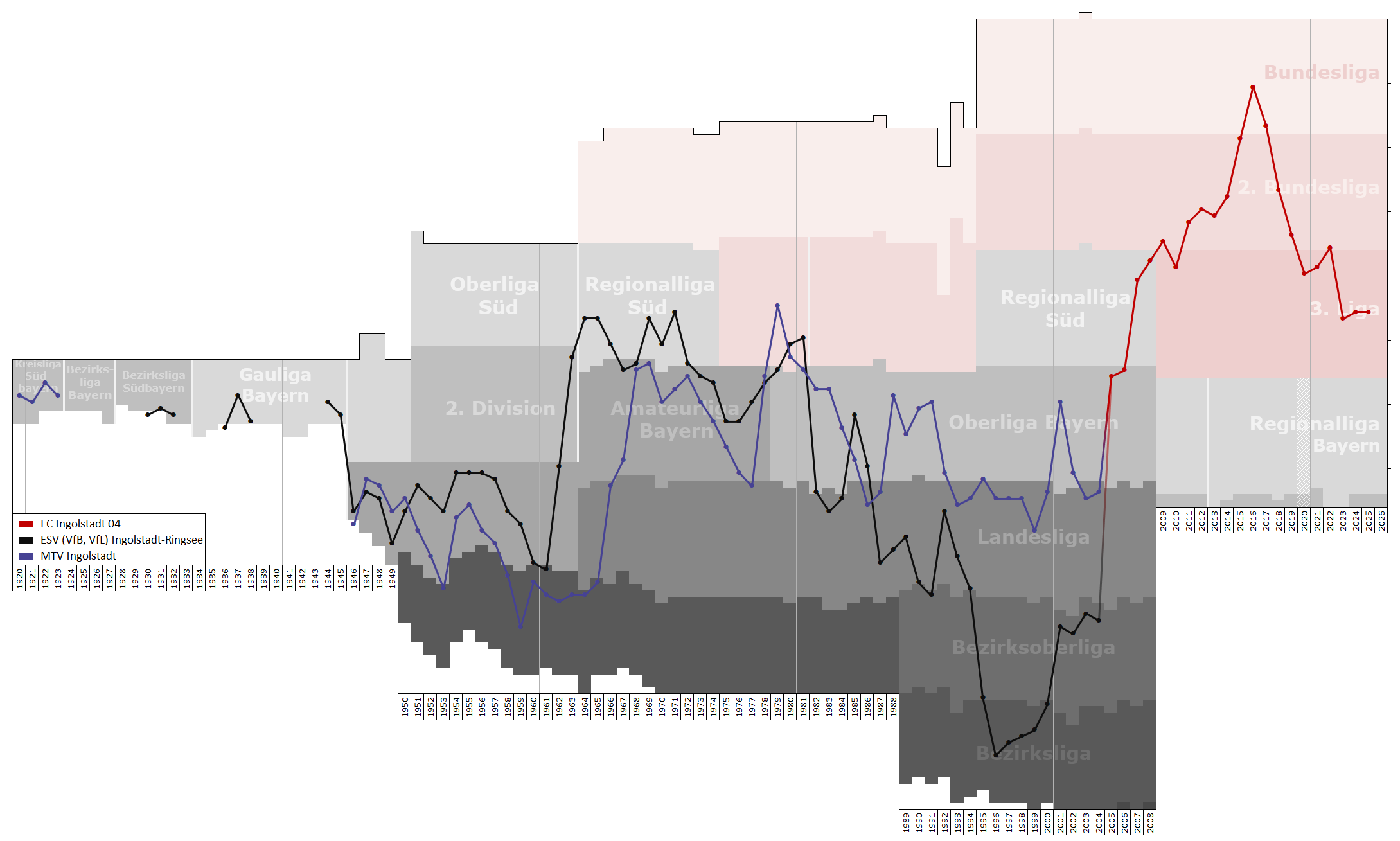
Historical chart of FC Ingolstadt and predecessors' league performance

=== ESV Ingolstadt ===
ESV Ingolstadt (Eisenbahner-Sportverein Ingolstadt-Ringsee e.V.) was founded in 1919 as FC Viktoria. Two years later the football players of Turnverein 1861 Ingolstadt joined the club to form VfR Ingolstadt. A number of other clubs from the Ringsee district fused with this club, but to little effect. The club's achievement amounted to not more than a couple of seasons spent in the Gauliga Bayern in 1936–38. After World War II, the club was re-constituted as VfR Ingolstadt, changed its name to Erster Sportverein Ingolstadt (First Sports Club Ingolstadt) in 1951 and then changed it again to its current form in 1953 when "E" came to stand for Eisenbahner to reflect its affiliation with the railway.

ESV Ingolstadt joined the Regionalliga Süd (II) in 1963 when the Bundesliga – Germany's professional football league – was formed. After bouncing between tiers II and III, capped with two seasons spent in 2. Bundesliga Süd from 1979 to 1981, the club began a descent through tier III to Landesliga Bayern-Süd (IV), last playing in 1993–94. The sports club itself carried on until it went bankrupt in the summer of 2004 and those football players there were left to join FC Ingolstadt 04. ESV continues to operate today offering a number of other sports activities while acknowledging FC 04 on its website.

=== MTV Ingolstadt ===
MTV Ingolstadt (Männer-Turn-Verein von 1881 Ingolstadt) is the city's largest sportsclub with 3,400 members and has an on-and-off relationship with its football side. The club was founded in 1881 and took up football in 1905. The footballers set up a separate club in 1924, but returned to the fold in 1933 at the direction of sports authorities in the Third Reich. After World War II occupying Allied authorities ordered the dissolution of all organizations in Germany, including sporting associations. The club was re-founded as Städtischer SV Ingolstadt 1881. Their original name was restored in 1948.

MTV spent two seasons in 2. Bundesliga Süd after Amateurliga Bayern champion 1. FC Haßfurt declined promotion in 1978. When ESV faced bankruptcy in 2004, MTV allowed its footballers to leave to help form FC Ingolstadt.

=== Current ===
Newly formed FC Ingolstadt began play in the Oberliga Bayern (IV) and managed to finish second in their first season In 2004–05. Their success continued in 2005–06 when they captured the divisional title and won promotion. They finished their debut Regionalliga Süd (III) campaign 2006–07 with a fifth-place result. League restructuring was planned for the 2008–09 season with the introduction of a national third division and FC would have to finish their 2007–08 Regionalliga season in the top 10 to qualify. They exceeded that goal by finishing second and advancing to the 2. Bundesliga.

Ingolstadt won its debut second division match, but the following months proved less successful for the club and by the mid-winter break they had dropped to 12th place. The latter half of the season proved even worse with the club only realizing 1 win in 18 matches. They finished the season in 17th place and were subsequently relegated to the 3. Liga.

FC delivered a steady performance in third division play and ended their campaign in third place. A new promotion/relegation format accompanied the introduction of the 3. Liga and the club's finish earned them a play-off versus Hansa Rostock which had finished in 16th (third last) place in the 2. Bundesliga. Ingolstadt won both legs of the two match play-off and returned to the second division alongside the top two third-tier teams which advanced automatically by virtue of their finishes.

On 17 May 2015, they clinched the 2014–15 2. Bundesliga title and won promotion for the first time in their history to the Bundesliga. Ingolstadt finished 11th in the 2015–16 Bundesliga, but the following year they fell to 17th and were relegated back to the 2. Bundesliga.

In the 2018–19 2. Bundesliga, Ingolstadt finished 16th and lost the relegation playoff against SV Wehen Wiesbaden on away goals.

In the 2019–20 3. Liga qualified for the promotion playoffs, but suffered more heartbreak, as a last second goal from Fabian Schleusener saw Ingolstadt lose to FC Nürnberg on away goals.

In the 2020–21 3. Liga, Ingolstadt were once again part of the relegation playoffs, and a 3–0 win over VfL Osnabrück in the first leg gave them the advantage heading into the second leg. Despite a 3–1 loss in the second leg, Ingolstadt won 4–3 on aggregate, and won promotion to the 2021–22 2. Bundesliga. The club were relegated back to the 3. Liga on the 31st matchday after a 2–2 draw against Karlsruhe.

In May 2024, the club announced that the previous U19 coach Sabrina Wittmann would coach the men's team until the end of the season. She was the first female head coach in German professional football.

== Sporting development after the merger ==
=== Bavarian and regional league (2004–2008) ===
The team aimed for promotion to the Regionalliga in its first season in the Bayernliga, but ended up in second place behind SpVgg Bayreuth, which delayed promotion by a year. After retaining the Regionalliga in 2006/07, FC Ingolstadt 04's objective for the second Regionalliga season in 2007/08 was to qualify for the new 3rd division and, if possible, even gain promotion to the 2nd Bundesliga. During the winter break, coach Jürgen Press publicly confirmed for the first time that he was aiming for the second division, but the FCI management did not trust him to achieve this and suspended Press on 1 January 2008. Three days later, Thorsten Fink was introduced as the new coach. Under him, Ingolstadt was promoted to the 2nd Bundesliga with a 2:0 victory over SpVgg Unterhaching on 31 May 2008.

=== First time at national level (2008–2015) ===
After finishing the first half of the first Bundesliga season in twelfth place, but then going eleven games without a win in the second half of the season and slipping to a relegation spot, Thorsten Fink was suspended on 21 April 2009.On 5 April, the club had given him a job guarantee until the end of the season and supervisory board member Andreas Schleef said in an interview on 17 April that a change of coach no longer made sense at this point. Michael Wiesinger, who had previously coached the U23s, stepped in as interim head coach for a few days. Horst Köppel became the new head coach on 26 April, but the run of winless matches continued under him. Relegation was sealed on matchday 32 with a 1–0 home defeat against FC St. Pauli.

On 9 November 2009, Köppel was released after a home defeat against Wuppertal. Co-trainer Michael Wiesinger took over the training. At the end of the 2009/10 third division season, the team finished third and played in two relegation matches against Hansa Rostock. FCI won both games (1–0 at home, 2–0 in Rostock) and thus managed an immediate return to Bundesliga 2.

However, the start to the 2010/11 season was a clear failure. After eleven games, FC Ingolstadt finished bottom of the table with just four points. Following a 2:1 defeat against Energie Cottbus on matchday 11, coach Wiesinger and assistant coach Uwe Wolf were sacked. Benno Möhlmann was introduced as his successor on 7 November 2010, with Sven Kmetsch as his new assistant coach. Almost exactly one year later, the club parted ways with Möhlmann and his assistant coach. At this point, FC Ingolstadt was in 18th place in the table with just nine points from 14 games. Tomas Oral was presented as the new coach on 10 November. Together with him, Thomas Linke was introduced as the new sporting director.

After a mixed 2012/13 season overall, which ended in 13th place, Oral was dismissed on 28 May 2013. Marco Kurz, who had previously worked for TSG 1899 Hoffenheim and had led 1. FC Kaiserslautern to the Bundesliga in 2010, was appointed as his successor for the 2013/14 season. However, after just nine match days and the seventh defeat – Ingolstadt was bottom of the table – the club parted company with Kurz on 30 September. On 4 October 2013, he hired Austrian Ralph Hasenhüttl as the new head coach, who led Ingolstadt to 10th place. The second division club extended Hasenhüttl's contract until 2016 and on 19 October 2014, the team won 1–0 at FSV Frankfurt. This was the 18th consecutive away match without defeat, a feat that no other club had achieved in the 40-year history of the Bundesliga 2.Ingolstadt remained unbeaten away from home until matchday 14, a run of 19 matches.

Starting the 2014/15 season as outsiders, they won the second division championship at the end of the season and were promoted to the Bundesliga for the first time. On 11 July 2015, the club was awarded the Bavarian Sports Prize in the "Personal Prize of the Bavarian Minister President" category.

=== Bundesliga (2015–2017) ===
The professional team set a record on 19 September 2015: With a 1:0 win at Werder Bremen and the preceding victories on 15 August 2015 at 1. FSV Mainz 05 and on 29 August 2015 at FC Augsburg, FC Ingolstadt 04 had become the first Bundesliga promoted team to win its first three away matches. After surprise victories at home against Schalke and Borussia Mönchengladbach, the Schanzer team ended up in eleventh place. During the summer break, coach Hasenhüttl moved to new league rivals RB Leipzig for a record fee. Markus Kauczinski was introduced as his successor. The start to the 2016/17 season did not go according to the expectations of those responsible and Kauczinski was dismissed after just two points from ten games. Maik Walpurgis was appointed as the new coach on 12 November. Despite an improved performance in the second half of the season, the team was unable to avoid relegation on match day 33 after a draw at SC Freiburg.

=== Bundesliga 2 and Bundesliga 3 (since 2017) ===
The 2017/18 season began with a 1–0 home defeat against Union Berlin. After two further defeats against Sandhausen and Regensburg, Walpurgis was dismissed. His successor was former professional footballer Stefan Leitl, who had already spent the last six years of his playing career in the service of FC Ingolstadt 04. After working their way up to fourth place and coming within a few points of the top three, the Schanzers slipped back into mid-table at the end of the season. As a result, they only finally secured their place in the league with a 2–0 win at Eintracht Braunschweig on matchday 33. After victories against TSV 1860 München and SpVgg Greuther Fürth, the team reached the round of 16 in the DFB Cup for the second time in the club's history, but was eliminated against the outsiders SC Paderborn from the 3rd football league.

The following year, the Schanzers were again knocked out of the cup by Paderborn, albeit in the first round. With just five points from six league games, the team fell far short of expectations in sporting terms. After a clear 6:0 defeat at VfL Bochum and a 0:1 at home against FC St. Pauli, coach Leitl was dismissed on 23 September 2018. Alexander Nouri was introduced as his successor. Despite the change of coach, the club was unable to turn its fortunes around and also parted ways with sporting director Angelo Vier on 23 October. The first point under Nouri was not scored until the 11th matchday at home against MSV Duisburg. On 26 November, after a 2–0 defeat against Dynamo in Dresden, Nouri was also sacked, leaving the team in last place in the table[28]. After youth coach Roberto Pätzold had coached the team in one match, Jens Keller was appointed as the new head coach before matchday 16. Keller was also unable to lead the team out of the bottom of the table and was replaced by Tomas Oral after matchday 27, when the team was bottom of the table.

Under Oral, the team won five of their last seven league games and moved up to 16th place in the table, which entitled them to take part in the relegation play-off against SV Wehen Wiesbaden. The first leg in Wiesbaden was won 2:1, but FCI lost the second leg 3:2 in front of their home crowd and were relegated to the 3rd division due to the away goals rule.

The team underwent a major shake-up for the 2019/20 season and the contracts of long-serving players such as Marvin Matip and Almog Cohen were not extended or were cancelled. Luxembourg's Jeff Saibene and his assistant Carsten Rump, a coaching duo who had already trained together at Arminia Bielefeld, joined the Schanzers. At the start of the season, they picked up ten points in four games and were top of the table. After temporarily slipping to eighth place in the table, they were able to work their way back up to second place behind fellow relegated team MSV Duisburg by the winter break. In the second half of the season, which was temporarily interrupted by the COVID-19 pandemic and subsequently played to a close without spectators, they slipped back into mid-table and brought Tomas Oral to the Danube for his third spell in charge. Under him, the Schanzers were able to get back into the promotion race and reached fourth place with a 2–0 win at TSV 1860 München on the final matchday, which entitled them to relegation to the 2nd Bundesliga against 1. FC Nürnberg, as FC Bayern München U23, who were top of the table, were not eligible for promotion. After a 2–0 defeat in Nuremberg in the first leg and a 3–1 win at home in the second leg (Ingolstadt led 3–0 until the sixth minute of injury time before Nuremberg managed to score), promotion was narrowly missed due to the away goals rule. In the DFB Cup, the Schanzers were knocked out in the first round against second-division side 1. FC Nürnberg with a 1–0 defeat, while in the Bavarian Cup they were beaten on penalties by 1. FC Schweinfurt 05 in the round of 16. FC Ingolstadt again reached the promotion relegation play-offs in the following season 2020/21, winning 3–0 in the first match against second-bottom VfL Osnabrück. Despite a 3–1 defeat in the second leg, they returned to the Bundesliga 2 after two years in the third tier.

Following promotion, the club and Tomas Oral parted ways by mutual agreement. Roberto Pätzold, who had previously coached the A-Juniors, became the new head coach for the 2021/22 season. After one win, one draw and six defeats from the first eight league games, he was replaced by André Schubert in 17th place. FC Ingolstadt 04 also parted company with sporting director Florian Zehe. After eight games without a win in the league and a DFB Cup exit against Borussia Dortmund, Schubert was dismissed on 8 December 2021. His successor was Rüdiger Rehm, under whom the club finished the first half of the season in last place with seven points. Although performances improved in the second half of the season, relegation was certain on match day 31.

After the team was relegated to the 3rd division, CEO Peter Jackwerth said: "Our desire and will is to get promoted again straight away. We are putting the pressure on with the opportunities we have. But not in terms of time." While 20 players left, ten were signed and a number of A-junior players were also called up to the squad; the club also retained coach Rehm. At the winter break, FC Ingolstadt were level on points with third-placed SV Wehen Wiesbaden in fourth place, but ten points separated the "Schanzers" from league leaders SV Elversberg. Of 11 games after the winter break, FC Ingolstadt lost nine (including a 4–1 defeat to Wehen Wiesbaden), drew one and won one, before slipping to 12th place in the table. As a result, the club parted ways with Rüdiger Rehm after matchday 20 and replaced him with Italian Guerino Capretti, who had coached Ingolstadt's fellow relegated team Dynamo Dresden until spring 2022. Sports director Malte Metzelder also terminated his contract in mid-March 2023.

On 4 April, the "Schanzers" parted ways with coach Guerino Capretti after 62 days in office. He was replaced by Michael Köllner. FC Ingolstadt finished the 2022–23 third division season in eleventh place. At the beginning of May 2024, the club parted ways with Köllner during the 2023/24 season and replaced him with Sabrina Wittmann, who had previously coached the U19 team. FC Ingolstadt now has the first female head coach in German men's professional football. FC Ingolstadt managed to win the Bavarian State Cup for the first time in the club's history with its head coach Sabrina Wittmann by beating Würzburger Kickers 2:1 in the final.

== Structure and organs ==
The professional football division was spun off into FC Ingolstadt 04 Fußball GmbH in 2007. The club owns the majority stake in FC Ingolstadt 04 Fußball GmbH with 80.06%. The remaining 19.94% (initially 49%) was held by Peter Jackwerth until 2013 and then sold to quattro GmbH, a subsidiary of the Audi Group. At the club's general meeting on 3 November 2015, an amendment to the statutes was passed, according to which a two-thirds majority of the general meeting is now required for the sale of shares in the GmbH.

=== Presidium (e. V.) ===
- Peter Jackwerth (President)
- Denise Englschall (Fans)
- Maximilian Fischer-Stabauer (Finance)
- Christoph Heckl (Vice President)
- Andreas Mayr (Vice President)
- Ivan Wyberal (Public Relations and Sponsorship)

Since December 2019, there has also been a seven-member Economic Advisory Board, a gathering of regional figures from business and politics, which is intended to advise and support the Executive Committee.

=== club presidents ===
- 2004–2006: Peter Jackwerth
- 2006–2010: Werner Roß
- since 2010: Peter Jackwerth (2nd term, 2010–2024 as Chairman of the Board of Directors)

=== Supervisory Board (GmbH) ===
- Karl Meier (Chairman)
- Christoph Heckl
- Peter Jackwerth
- Andreas Mayr
- Gerd Walker
- Andreas Zelzer

=== Management (limited liability company) ===
- Dietmar Beiersdorfer

== Stadium ==
=== The MTV Ingolstadt stadium (district sports centre) ===
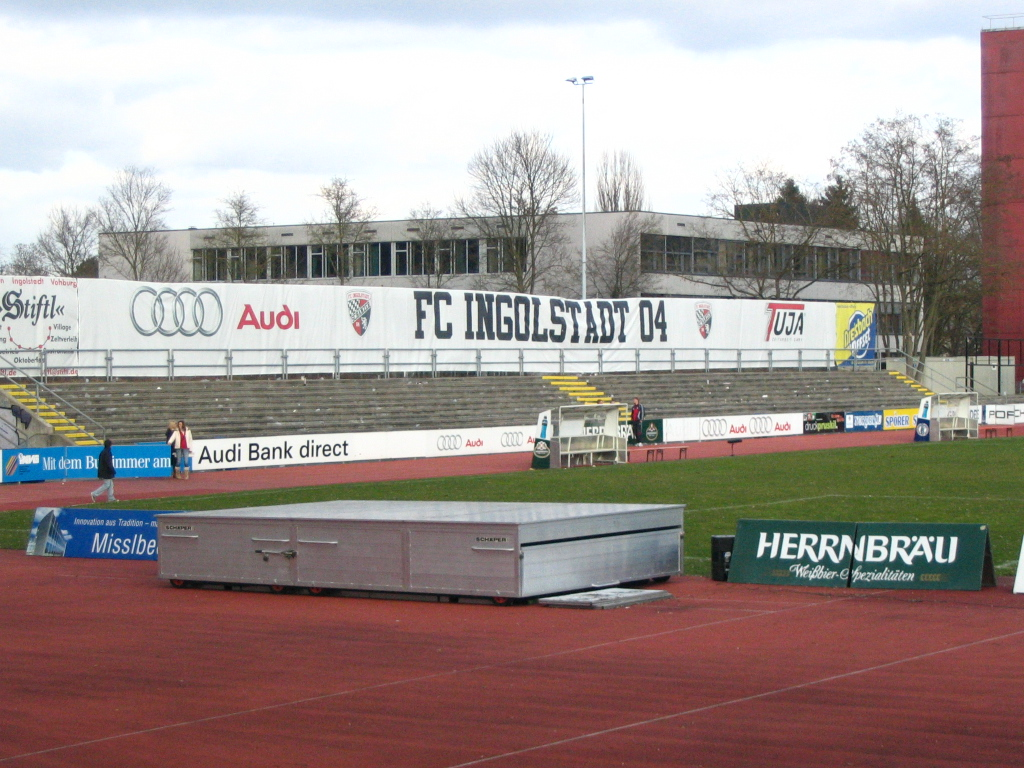
MTV Ingolstadt stadium

- District sports centre Ingolstadt
- Opening 1971
- District sports centre Mitte, Friedhofstr. 10, 85049 Ingolstadt
- Capacity: 8,000 seats
- FC Ingolstadt 04 played its regional league home matches here until the 2007/08 season

=== ESV Stadium (formerly Tuja Stadium) ===
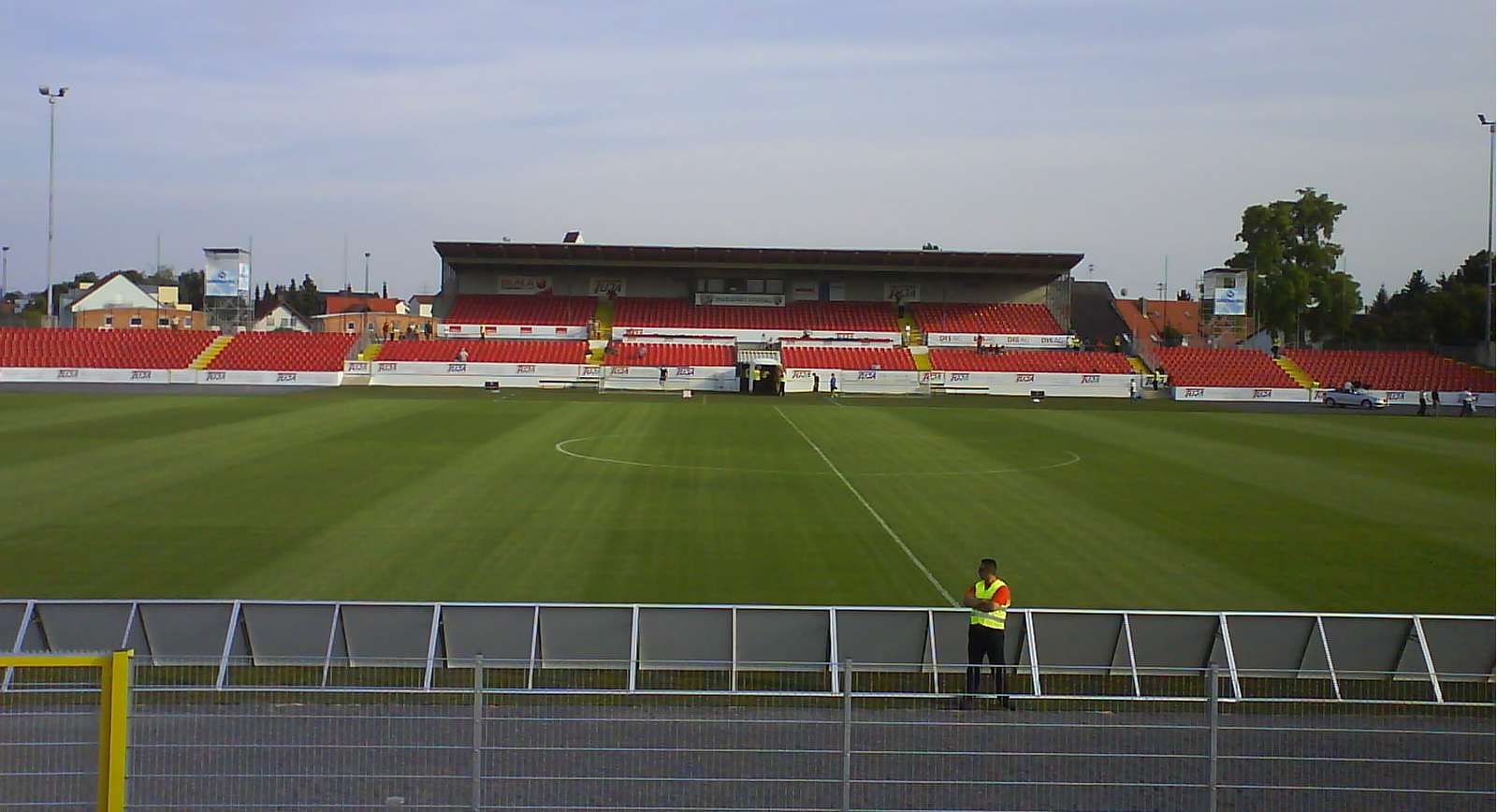
ESV stadium

- ESV Stadium Ingolstadt
- Opening 1932
- South-east district sports centre, Geisenfelder Straße 1, 85053 Ingolstadt
- Capacity: 11,418 seats
- On 23 November 2007, those responsible at FC Ingolstadt 04 learned that a move from the MTV Stadium to the ESV Stadium would be unavoidable in the event of promotion to the third or second division. According to the DFB, this was the only place that would fulfil the strict requirements set by the German Football Association for the new 3rd division. The MTV stadium would be out of the question simply because of its spectator capacity, as 10,000 seats are required for the 3rd division. However, the ageing ESV Stadium in the Ringsee district was only a stopover.

=== Audi Sportpark ===
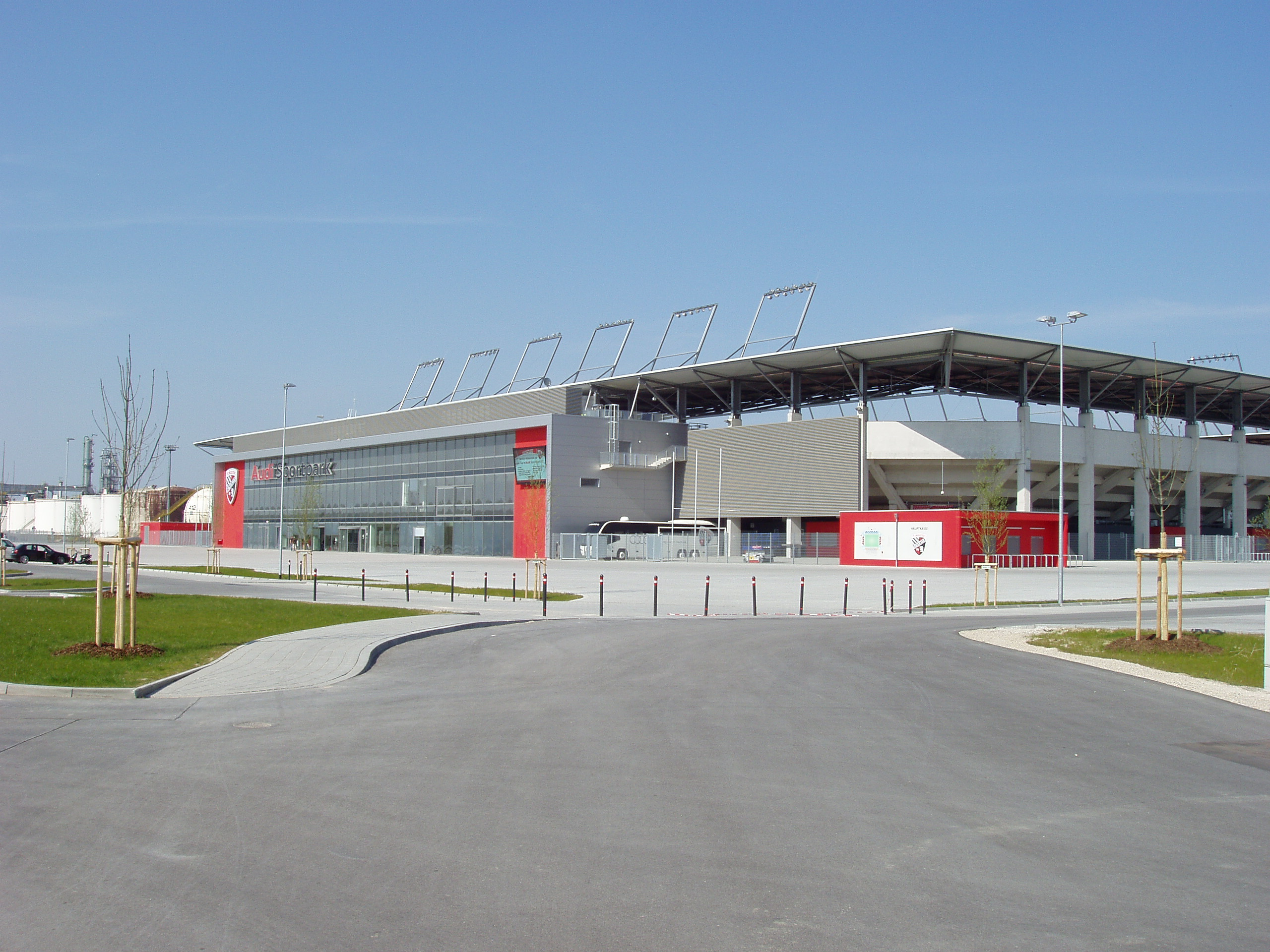
Audi Sportpark

- Audi Sportpark Ingolstadt
- Venue of FC Ingolstadt 04 since the 2010/11 season
- Am Sportpark 1, 85053 Ingolstadt
- Capacity: 15,200 seats
- Opening on 24 July 2010
- A new, fully covered stadium under the working title "Audi-Sportpark" with space for 15,200 spectators (9,200 seated and 6,000 standing) was completed on the former Bayernoil refinery site in the east of Ingolstadt. The construction costs of approx. 25 million euros, in which the Ingolstadt-based car manufacturer and shirt sponsor Audi contributed 5 million euros for the naming rights to the stadium, the city of Ingolstadt provided a deficiency guarantee. The Group owns both the stadium and the club's training ground via its subsidiary Audi Immobilien Verwaltung GmbH, which has held 100% of the shares in FC Ingolstadt Stadionbetreiber GmbH since 2013.

== Sponsors and equipment suppliers ==
Local car manufacturer Audi and recruitment and temporary employment agency team KRAFT support FC Ingolstadt as main sponsors alongside sportswear manufacturer Erreà.Audi is also a shareholder in the club's operating company through Audi Sport GmbH and owns the Audi Sportpark through Audi Immobilien Verwaltung GmbH. However, the club must pay around 3.5 million euros annually to the stadium operator, which belongs to the Audi Group, for the use of the sports and office space.

=== jersey sponsors ===
- 2004–2006: Tuja Zeitarbeit
- 2006–2015: Audi
- 2015–2019: MediaMarkt
- 2019–2023: Prosis
- 2023–2025: SI Electronics
- since 2025: team KRAFT

=== supplier ===
- 2004–2006: Erreà
- 2006–2007: Adidas
- 2007–2010: Nike
- 2010–2019: Adidas
- 2019–2024: Puma
- since 2024: Erreà

== Second team ==
The second team took over ESV Ingolstadt's place in the Upper Bavaria district league for the 2004/05 season. In its second year, it was promoted to the state league. In 2011, the team was promoted to the regional league because FC Ismaning did not receive a licence. Since 2012, it has played in the newly created Bavarian regional league. Due to the first team's relegation to the 3rd league in the 2018/19 season, the second team was forced to relegate to the fifth-tier Bayernliga for the 2019/20 season after finishing in 9th place. The club's home ground is the ESV Stadium, not far from the main railway station.

== Reserve team ==
FC Ingolstadt 04 II played the 2011–12 season in the Regionalliga Süd after finishing runners-up in the Bayernliga and taking FC Ismaning's promotion spot after the later declined promotion. In the 2012–13 season the team played in the new Regionalliga Bayern.

== Youth football ==
FC Ingolstadt 04 cooperates with clubs in the region, such as VfB Eichstätt, with a particular focus on promoting young talent. So-called ‘perspective team’ locations are Abensberg, Eichstätt, Ingolstadt, Hilpoltstein, Schweitenkirchen and Unterföhring.

== Women's football ==
The first women's team of FC Ingolstadt 04 started in 2004 in the Upper Bavaria district league. In 2011, the team was promoted to the Southern Regional League, before going on to win the Bavarian League undefeated. There, FCI finished as runners-up behind 1. FC Nürnberg in 2013. A year later, the Ingolstadt women secured the championship and promotion to the Regionalliga Süd. There, the ‘Schanzerinnen’ became champions in 2019 and prevailed against Borussia Bocholt in the promotion play-offs to the 2. Bundesliga.

In addition to the first women's team, there has also been a second team since 2004, which has been playing in the Bayernliga since 2024. The club also has two B-junior girls' teams. The teams play on the grass pitch at the Bezirkssportanlage Mitte and the artificial turf pitch 1 at the Audi Sportpark.

== E-sports ==
The Ingolstadt e-sports department was founded in October 2018. The 2018/19 season was its debut season in the Virtual Bundesliga Club Championship.

== Blind football ==
The blind football department was established in 2022 and has been playing in the Blind Football Bundesliga since 2023 as the first Bavarian club.

== Fan and club culture ==
=== Fan scene ===
When FC Ingolstadt 04 emerged from the merger in 2004, the supporters of FC Ingolstadt were made up of the former fans of both predecessor clubs. The former rivals between the "Staderer", as MTV Ingolstadt liked to be dubbed by "those out there" (ESV Ingolstadt), became friends and allies.

The fan scene in Ingolstadt developed slowly in the first few years after the club was founded in 2004. Since the club was promoted back to the Bundesliga 2 and moved to the Audi-Sportpark, however, an increase in active fans has been observed. There are currently 40 fan clubs officially recognized by the club (as of 29 June 2020).

The "Red-Rebelz" group was founded back in the years when FC Ingolstadt was still playing in the regional league. This is considered the forerunner of today's Ultra group. In 2008, the "Supporters Ingolstadt" were finally formed. In December 2008, the Black Red Company (BRC '08) fan group was founded. Other well-known groups include the Insieme Boys, the Common Sense Crew, the Bande 8070, the XII. Legion, Nouvelle Generation (in the meantime Supporters Ingolstadt), the Torkelschanzer and IN Kognito.

The "Südtribüne Ingolstadt" fan block is located behind the goal with around 3,000 standing places. The Südtribüne Ingolstadt is divided into blocks U and V.

When fans of Schanzer midfielder Almog Cohen displayed the flag of his home country Israel in the stadium on 26 April 2015 in support of him at the away match against 1. FC Union Berlin, the police commander in charge ordered the flag to be rolled up to avert danger. Because of the large Palestinian community in Berlin, no political statement was desired in the stadium. When Cohen asked whether flags from other countries were also banned, he was told that this only applied to the "Jewish" flag. The Berlin police chief later apologized for the incident.

The Ingolstadt fan project has also existed since 2021. The fan project focuses on the socio-educational support and guidance of the young soccer fan scene from the entire region.

=== Well-known fans ===
Günter Grünwald, presenter and cabaret artist

Markus Kavka, presenter, journalist, author and DJ

Horst Seehofer, politician

=== Fan friendships ===
The various fan groups maintain fan friendships with fans of SV Wehen Wiesbaden, SpVgg Unterhaching and SM Caen from France.

Members of the clubs' organised fan scenes regularly visit each other's matches and are in regular contact.

The fans of Fc Ingolstadt often create choreographies that emphasise their friendship with other clubs.

The fans also maintain contact with fans of the Scottish football club Raith Rovers from Ingolstadt's twin town Kirkcaldy.

=== Rivalries ===
The fans are most antipathetic towards SSV Jahn Regensburg, but matches against FC Augsburg are also prestigious among the fans. In the 2014/15 season, several choreographies emphasised a dislike of RB Leipzig.

=== Mascot ===
Since 2012, the club has had a mascot called Schanzi, which represents a red panther (medieval fantasy creature)

=== Club anthem ===
The official club anthem is called "Schanzer Herz", performed by Ingolstadt-based hard rock band Bonfire. The stadium's goal theme song is "Esellied", performed by South Tyrol band Volxrock. The pre-kick-off song is "Thunderstruck" by AC/DC.

=== Stadium newspaper ===
A new edition of the stadium newspaper "Schanzer Bladdl" is published for every home game.

=== The name 'die Schanzer' ===
shows the club's connection to the city of Ingolstadt and its history. The rulers and governors of the city on the Danube have always appreciated and protected its strategic location at the river crossing and on important trade routes. This is why the expansion of Ingolstadt into a Bavarian state fortress began in 1537. During this time, Ingolstadt was given the name 'die Schanz', which still reminds us today of Ingolstadt's past as a fortress city.

== Trivia ==
On 31 July 2015, the club was voted ‘Jersey Champion of the 2015/16 Bundesliga Season’ by fashion design students at the Mediadesign University of Applied Sciences in Düsseldorf for the red and black home jersey of FC Ingolstadt 04. [96] FC Ingolstadt 04 thus replaced two-time winner Bayer 04 Leverkusen, which won the title of ‘Kit Champion of the Year’ in 2014 alongside Borussia Dortmund, Hannover 96, 1. FC Nürnberg, FC St. Pauli, TSG 1899 Hoffenheim and Eintracht Frankfurt.

== Players ==
=== Current squad ===
As of 3 September 2026

Note: Flags indicate national team as defined under FIFA eligibility rules; some limited exceptions apply. Players may hold more than one non-FIFA nationality.

No.	Pos.	Nation	Player
1	GK	GER	Markus Ponath
2	DF	HUN	Noel Lakatos
4	DF	GER	Elias Decker
5	MF	TUR	Emre Gül
6	DF	GRE	Georgios Antzoulas
7	MF	KOR	Seo Jong-min
8	MF	DEN	Fredrik Carlsen
9	FW	USA	Mason Toye
10	MF	GER	Dennis Kaygin
11	FW	MKD	Sejdo Durakov
13	FW	GER	Lars Lokotsch
14	MF	GER	Max Plath
15	DF	GER	Jonas Scholz
16	FW	ISR	Joseph Ganda
17	FW	NGR	Obed Chidindu Ugondu

No.	Pos.	Nation	Player
18	DF	ENG	Keanan Bennetts
19	DF	GER	Linus Rosenlöcher
20	MF	GER	Yannick Deichmann
23	DF	FIN	Jasper Maljojoki
27	DF	GER	Tomislav Bagaric
28	FW	AUS	Nishan Velupillay
30	FW	SRB	Ognjen Drakulić
32	DF	GER	Simon Lorenz (captain)
33	DF	GER	Davide-Danilo Sekulovic
34	MF	GER	Lukas Fröde
37	MF	AUT	Benjamin Kanurić
40	GK	GER	Rafael Eßlinger
41	MF	GER	Vinko Šapina
47	GK	GER	David Klein

=== Out on loan ===
Note: Flags indicate national team as defined under FIFA eligibility rules; some limited exceptions apply. Players may hold more than one non-FIFA nationality.

No.	Pos.	Nation	Player
—	MF	TUR	Berkay Öztürk (at 1. FC Schweinfurt 05 until 30 June 2027)

== Honours ==
=== League ===
- 2.Bundesliga (II)
  - Champions: 2014–15
- Regionalliga Süd (III)
  - Runners-up: 2008
- Bayernliga (IV)
  - Champions: 2006
  - Runners-up: 2005, 2011^{‡}
- Landesliga Bayern-Süd (V)
  - Runners-up: 2008^{‡}
- Bezirksoberliga Oberbayern (VI)
  - Runners-up: 2006^{‡}

=== Cup ===
- Bavarian Cup
  - Winner: 2024
  - Runners-up: 2005, 2023
- Oberbayern Cup
  - Winner: 2005, 2006, 2007

=== Youth ===
- Under 19 Bayernliga
  - Champions: 2015
- Under 17 Bayernliga
  - Champions: 2013
- Under 15 Bayernliga
  - Champions: 2014, 2016

=== Women ===
- Bezirksoberliga Oberbayern
  - Winner: 2015–16^{‡}

- ^{‡} Reserve team

== Coaching staff ==
Position	Name
Head Coach	(Germany) Achim Beierlorzer
Assistant Head Coach	(Germany) Fabian Reichler (Bulgaria) Iliya Gruev
Goalkeeping Coach	(Poland) Robert Wulnikowski
Athletic Coach	(Germany) Luca Schuster
Rehab Coach	(Germany) Christian Liefke
Match Analysis	(Germany) Nico Hurst
Managing Director	(Germany) Dietmar Beiersdorfer
Sporting Director	(Bosnia and Herzegovina) Ivica Grlić
Team Coordinator	(Germany) Marcel Posselt
Commercial Director / Head of Media and Communications	(Germany) Florian Günzler
Head of Scouting	(Germany) Marius Reiher
Scout	(Germany) Björn Ganser
Youth Chief Scout	(Germany) Jannis Fischer
Doctor	(Germany) Dr. Alexander Röhrl
Physiotherapists	(Germany) Noah Attmanspacher (Germany) Dominik Dürrschmidt
Medical Director	(Germany) Georg Meyer
Press officer	(Germany) Kristina Richter
Kit Manager	(Germany) Michael Klattenbacher
Club Representative	(Germany) Werner Roß
Team Manager	(Germany) Lisa Deutschmann
Academy Manager	(Germany) Roland Reichel (Germany) Dr. Philipp Kaß

== Recent managers ==
Manager	Start	Finish
Jürgen Press	1 July 2004	1 January 2008
Thorsten Fink	5 January 2008	21 April 2009
Horst Köppel	27 April 2009	8 November 2009
Michael Wiesinger	9 November 2009	6 November 2010
Benno Möhlmann	7 November 2010	9 November 2011
Tomas Oral	10 November 2011	27 May 2013
Marco Kurz	10 June 2013	30 September 2013
Ralph Hasenhüttl	4 October 2013	30 June 2016
Markus Kauczinski	1 July 2016	6 November 2016
Maik Walpurgis	12 November 2016	22 August 2017
Stefan Leitl	22 August 2017	22 September 2018
Alexander Nouri	24 September 2018	26 November 2018
Roberto Pätzold	26 September 2018	2 December 2018
Jens Keller	2 December 2018	2 April 2019
Tomas Oral	3 April 2019	30 June 2019
Jeff Saibene	1 July 2019	9 March 2020
Tomas Oral	11 March 2020	30 June 2021
Roberto Pätzold	1 July 2021	26 September 2021
André Schubert	26 September 2021	8 December 2021
Rüdiger Rehm	8 December 2021	31 January 2023
Guerino Capretti	1 February 2023	4 April 2023
Michael Köllner	6 April 2023	2 May 2024
Sabrina Wittmann	2 May 2024	24 September 2026
Achim Beierlorzer	25 September 2026	present

== FC Ingolstadt 04 seasons ==
=== First team ===
Season	Division	Tier	Position
2004–05	Bayernliga	IV	2nd
2005–06	Bayernliga	IV	1st ↑
2006–07	Regionalliga Süd	III	5th
2007–08	Regionalliga Süd	III	2nd ↑
2008–09	2. Bundesliga	II	17th ↓
2009–10	3. Liga	III	3rd ↑
2010–11	2. Bundesliga	II	14th
2011–12	2. Bundesliga	II	12th
2012–13	2. Bundesliga	II	13th
2013–14	2. Bundesliga	II	10th
2014–15	2. Bundesliga	II	1st ↑
2015–16	Bundesliga	I	11th
2016–17	Bundesliga	I	17th ↓
2017–18	2. Bundesliga	II	9th
2018–19	2. Bundesliga	II	16th ↓
2019–20	3. Liga	III	4th
2020–21	3. Liga	III	3rd ↑
2021–22	2. Bundesliga	II	18th ↓
2022–23	3. Liga	III	11th
2023–24	3. Liga	III	10th
2024–25	3. Liga	III	10th
2025–26	3. Liga	III	12th
2026–27	3. Liga		

=== Reserve team ===
Season	Division	Tier	Position
2004–05	Bezirksoberliga Oberbayern	VI	5th
2005–06	Bezirksoberliga Oberbayern	VI	2nd ↑
2006–07	Landesliga Bayern-Süd	V	6th
2007–08	Landesliga Bayern-Süd	V	2nd ↑
2008–09	Bayernliga	V	6th
2009–10	Bayernliga	V	6th
2010–11	Bayernliga	V	2nd ↑
2011–12	Regionalliga Süd	IV	9th
2012–13	Regionalliga Bayern	IV	8th
2013–14	Regionalliga Bayern	IV	6th
2014–15	Regionalliga Bayern	IV	5th
2015–16	Regionalliga Bayern	IV	11th
2016–17	Regionalliga Bayern	IV	

- With the introduction of the Regionalligas in 1994 and the 3. Liga in 2008 as the new third tier, below the 2. Bundesliga, all leagues below dropped one tier. With the establishment of the Regionalliga Bayern as the new fourth tier in Bavaria in 2012 the Bayernliga was split into a northern and a southern division, the number of Landesligas expanded from three to five and the Bezirksoberligas abolished. All leagues from the Bezirksligas onwards were elevated one tier.

Key

↑ Promoted	↓ Relegated

== DFB Cup appearances ==
The club has qualified for the first round of the German Cup 17 times:

Season	Round	Date	Home	Away	Result	Attendance
2005–06	First	20 August 2005	FC Ingolstadt 04	1. FC Saarbrücken	1–1 aet (3–5 pen)	2,000
2008–09	First	9 August 2008	FC Ingolstadt 04	Hamburger SV	1–3	11,000
2009–10	First	31 July 2009	FC Ingolstadt 04	FC Augsburg	1–2	5,250
2010–11	First	13 August 2010	FC Ingolstadt 04	Karlsruher SC	2–0	6,600
2010–11	Second	27 October 2010	TSG 1899 Hoffenheim	FC Ingolstadt 04	1–0	10,500
2011–12	First	31 July 2011	FC Oberneuland	FC Ingolstadt 04	1–4	750
2011–12	Second	26 October 2011	Bayern Munich	FC Ingolstadt 04	6–0	63,000
2012–13	First	19 August 2012	VfR Aalen	FC Ingolstadt 04	3–0	3,027
2013–14	First	3 August 2013	Sportfreunde Baumberg	FC Ingolstadt 04	1–4	2,448
2013–14	Second	25 September 2013	FSV Frankfurt	FC Ingolstadt 04	0–2	3,089
2013–14	Round of 16	4 December 2013	VfL Wolfsburg	FC Ingolstadt 04	2–1	7,846
2014–15	First	18 August 2014	Kickers Offenbach	FC Ingolstadt 04	0–0 aet (4–2 pen)	7,386
2015–16	First	9 August 2015	SpVgg Unterhaching	FC Ingolstadt 04	2–1	6,500
2016–17	First	21 August 2016	Erzgebirge Aue	FC Ingolstadt 04	0–0 aet (7–8 pen)	6,650
2016–17	Second	25/26 Oct 2016	Eintracht Frankfurt	FC Ingolstadt 04	0–0 aet (4–1 pen)	6,300
2017–18	First	13 August 2017	1860 Munich	FC Ingolstadt 04	1–2	12,500
2017–18	Second	24 October 2017	Greuther Fürth	FC Ingolstadt 04	1–3	4,925
2017–18	Third	19 December 2017	SC Paderborn	FC Ingolstadt 04	1–0	14,800
2018–19	First	20 August 2018	SC Paderborn	FC Ingolstadt 04	2–1	9,427
2019–20	First	9 August 2019	FC Ingolstadt 04	1. FC Nürnberg	0–1	14,348
2020–21	First	12 September 2020	FC Ingolstadt 04	Fortuna Düsseldorf	0–1	0
2021–22	First	9 August 2021	FC Ingolstadt 04	Erzgebirge Aue	2–1	3,322
2021–22	Second	26 October 2021	Borussia Dortmund	FC Ingolstadt 04	2–0	28,000
2022–23	First	1 August 2022	FC Ingolstadt 04	Darmstadt 98	0–3	5,298
2024–25	First	17 August 2024	FC Ingolstadt 04	1. FC Kaiserslautern	1–2	11,655
