= Jasper Maljojoki =

Finnish footballer (born 2002)

Personal information
- Date of birth: 11 June 2002 (age 24)
- Place of birth: Cambridge, United States
- Height: 1.91 m (6 ft 3 in)
- Position: Centre-back

Team information
- Current team: FC Ingolstadt
- Number: 23

Youth career
- –2015: Milbertshofen
- 2016–2021: Unterhaching

Senior career*
Years	Team	Apps	(Gls)
2021	Unterhaching	0	(0)
2022–2023	Heimstetten	39	(1)
2023–2025	Wacker Burghausen	62	(12)
2025–	FC Ingolstadt	13	(3)
- * Club domestic league appearances and goals as of 29 May 2026

Jasper Maljojoki (born 11 June 2002) is a Finnish professional footballer who plays as a centre-back for German 3. Liga club FC Ingolstadt.

== Career ==
On 2 August 2023, Maljojoki left SV Heimstetten and signed with SV Wacker Burghausen in Regionalliga Bayern on a two-year deal. He left Wacker Burghausen at the end of the 2024–25 season.

On 25 July 2025, Maljojoki signed with FC Ingolstadt in 3. Liga.

== Career statistics ==
As of 29 May 2026

Appearances and goals by club, season and competition
Club	Season	League			National cup		Other		Total	
Club	Season	Division	Apps	Goals	Apps	Goals	Apps	Goals	Apps	Goals
SV Heimstetten	2021–22	Regionalliga Bayern	6	1	–		–		6	1
SV Heimstetten	2022–23	Regionalliga Bayern	33	0	–		2 (Note: Includes Bavarian Cup)	0	35	0
SV Heimstetten	Total		39	1	0	0	2	0	41	1
SV Wacker Burghausen	2023–24	Regionalliga Bayern	30	6	–		0	0	30	6
SV Wacker Burghausen	2024–25	Regionalliga Bayern	32	6	–		2	0	34	6
SV Wacker Burghausen	Total		62	12	0	0	2	0	64	12
FC Ingolstadt	2025–26	3. Liga	13	3	0	0	1	0	14	3
FC Ingolstadt II	2025–26	Bayernliga	1	0	–		–		1	0
Career total			115	16	0	0	5	0	120	16
