= Ole Werner =

German football manager

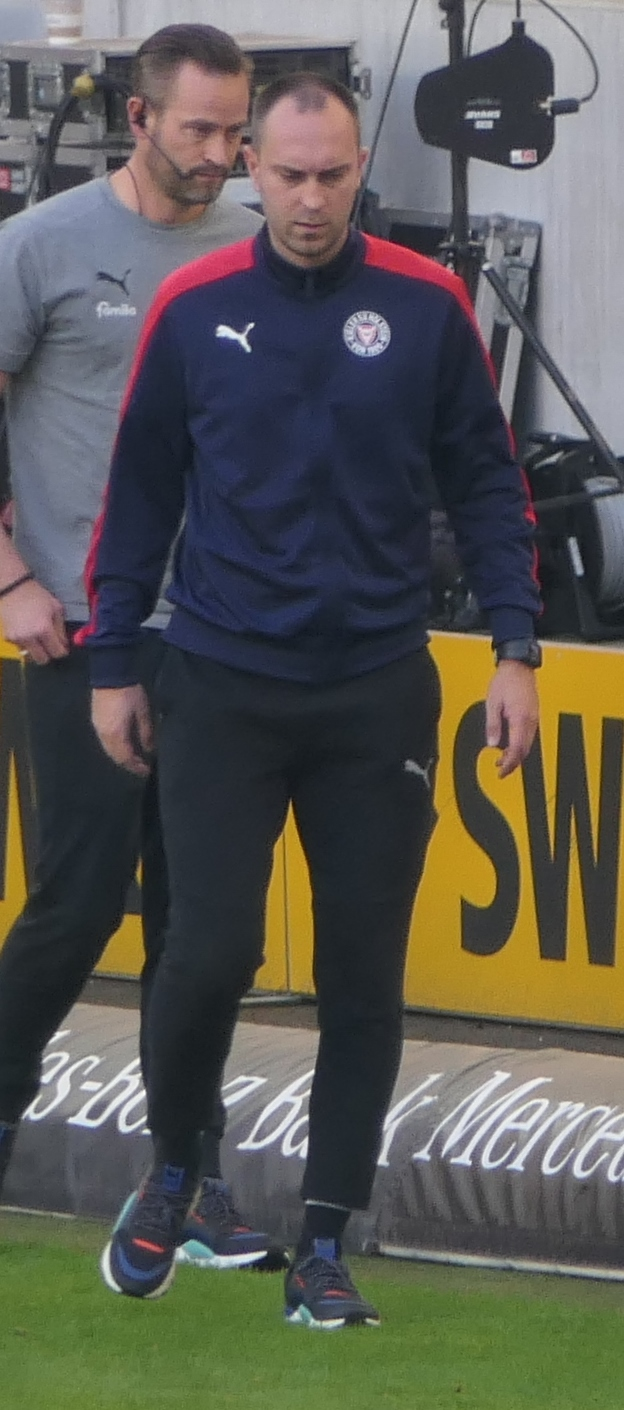
- Werner with Holstein Kiel in 2019

Personal information
- Date of birth: 4 May 1988 (age 38)
- Place of birth: Preetz, West Germany
- Height: 1.89 m (6 ft 2 in)

Youth career
- 2006–2007: Holstein Kiel

Senior career*
Years	Team	Apps	(Gls)
2006–2007	Holstein Kiel II		
2007–2008	Holstein Kiel		
2008–2009	TSV Kropp		

Managerial career
- 2014–2019: Holstein Kiel II
- 2016: Holstein Kiel (interim)
- 2019–2021: Holstein Kiel
- 2021–2025: Werder Bremen
- 2025–2026: RB Leipzig
- * Club domestic league appearances and goals

Ole Werner (born 4 May 1988) is a German professional football manager and former player who was most recently the head coach of Bundesliga side RB Leipzig.

== Coaching career ==
Ahead of the 2013–14 season, Werner was hired as youth coach at his former club, Holstein Kiel. More precisely, he became assistant coach for the club's U16 team. For the 2014–15 season, he became assistant to Christian Riecks at the second team, which played in the fifth-tier Oberliga Schleswig-Holstein. He succeeded Riecks in November 2014 and finished the season with the team in 2nd place. This was followed by 3rd place in the 2015–16 season.

On 17 August 2016, following the dismissal of Karsten Neitzel, Werner became head coach of Holstein Kiel as interim manager. He managed two matches, first in the Schleswig-Holstein Cup quarter-final against ETSV Weiche which finished as a 2–0 win. He also managed a 3. Liga match against FSV Zwickau, which finished as a 3–0 win. On 27 August, he was replaced by Markus Anfang and returned to the second team, with whom he finished the 2016–17 season in 2nd place.

On 16 September 2019, Werner returned as the interim manager for Kiel, which was in 16th place with five points after matchday 6, following the dismissal of André Schubert. On 24 October 2019, After six points from four games, he was permanently appointed as manager of Holstein Kiel, signing a deal until June 2022. He ultimately finished the 2019–20 season with Kiel in a safe 11th place. He resigned as coach of Holstein Kiel in September 2021 after four losses in seven games.

On 28 November 2021, Werner was named the new manager of Werder Bremen as successor to Markus Anfang, who had resigned. The newly relegated Bundesliga side were in 10th place with 20 points after matchday 15. Werner won the first seven games with his new team and led them to second place. Bremen were able to defend this position, meaning that at the end of the season they were directly promoted back to the Bundesliga for the 2022–23 season with 63 points, two points behind Schalke 04.

On 27 May 2025, following the conclusion of the 2024–25 season, he left the club by mutual consent after notifying them that he did not intend to extend his contract beyond the 2025–26 season.

On 24 June 2025, he was signed by RB Leipzig until 2027. In his debut season, he guided the club to a third-place finish in the Bundesliga and qualification for the UEFA Champions League. He was sacked after just one season in June 2026.

== Managerial statistics ==
As of match played 16 May 2026

Managerial record by team and tenure
Team	From	To	Record								Ref
Team	From	To	G	W	D	L	GF	GA	GD	Win %	Ref
Holstein Kiel II	17 November 2014	16 September 2019	158	89	34	35	334	180	+154	56.33	
Holstein Kiel (interim)	16 August 2016	30 August 2016	2	2	0	0	5	0	+5	100.00	
Holstein Kiel	16 September 2019	20 September 2021	78	33	21	24	132	114	+18	42.31	
Werder Bremen	28 November 2021	27 May 2025	128	52	29	47	210	205	+5	40.63	
RB Leipzig	24 June 2025	17 June 2026	38	23	5	10	77	53	+24	60.53	
Total			404	199	89	116	758	552	+206	49.26	—
