= Guerino Capretti =

German footballer and coach

Personal information
- Date of birth: 5 February 1982 (age 44)
- Place of birth: Maddaloni, Italy
- Height: 1.79 m (5 ft 10 in)
- Position: Defender

Team information
- Current team: 1. FC Bocholt (manager)

Youth career
- –1998: TSG Harsewinkel
- 1998–2002: SC Paderborn 07

Senior career*
Years	Team	Apps	(Gls)
2002–2004	SC Paderborn 07	4	(0)
2004–2005	FC Gütersloh 2000		
2005–2008	Delbrücker SC	62+	(4+)
2008–2010	SC Preußen Münster	53	(1)
2010–2015	SC Verl	121	(6)
2015–2017	Delbrücker SC		
Total		240+	(11+)

Managerial career
- 2015–2017: Delbrücker SC (player-manager)
- 2017–2022: SC Verl
- 2022: Dynamo Dresden
- 2023: FC Ingolstadt
- 2024–2026: VfB Lübeck
- 2026–: 1. FC Bocholt
- * Club domestic league appearances and goals

Guerino Capretti (born 5 February 1982) is a German former footballer and coach, who manages 1. FC Bocholt. He previously managed SC Verl, Dynamo Dresden, FC Ingolstadt, and VfB Lübeck. As a player he played for SC Paderborn, FC Gütersloh, Delbrücker SC, Preußen Münster and SC Verl.

== Playing career ==
Capretti was born in Maddaloni, Italy, but was raised in Germany and was educated at Gymnasium Harsewinkel in Harsewinkel. He played youth football with TSG Harsewinkel, before playing with SC Paderborn between 1998 and 2004. He spent the 2004–05 season with FC Gütersloh, before playing for Delbrücker SC between 2005 and 2008. He scored 3 times in 32 Oberliga Westfalen matches during the 2006–07 season, and once in 30 matches during the 2007–08 Oberliga Westfalen.

In February 2008, it was announced that Capretti would join Preußen Münster on a two-year contract from the start of the 2008–09 season. He was club captain during his time at Preußen Münster, and made 53 league appearances in the Regionalliga West over two seasons at the club. He was released by the club in summer 2010.

He transferred to SC Verl in summer 2010, and played 121 times in the Regionalliga West for the club across 5 seasons.

== Managerial career ==
Capretti returned to Delbrücker SC as player-coach in January 2015, on a contract until summer 2015, and he obtained his UEFA B License in summer 2015.

=== SC Verl ===
In January 2017, Capretti was announced as the new manager of Regionalliga West club SC Verl for the following season. He took over as manager of SC Verl in April 2017, after Andreas Golombek was sacked, though he would remain active as a player for Delbrücker SC until the end of the season. He led Verl to a 13th place finish in the 2016–17 season, and in the 2017–18 season, his first full season as manager, Verl finished 8th. In January 2019, his contract with Verl was extended to 2021, and Verl finished the 2018–19 season in 7th.

In March 2020, Capretti again extended his contract with Verl until summer 2022. The 2019–20 Regionalliga was cancelled due to the COVID-19 pandemic with Verl 2nd in the Regionalliga West, and as league leaders SV Rödinghausen did not apply for a license to compete in the 3. Liga, Verl entered the Regionalliga promotion play-offs. The club were promoted to the 3. Liga through the play-offs, winning on away goals after drawing over two legs against Lokomotive Leipzig.

Capretti led Verl to a 7th place finish in their first year back in the 3. Liga, but he left Verl in February 2022, with the club occupying a relegation place in the 3. Liga.

=== Dynamo Dresden and FC Ingolstadt ===
On 2 March 2022, Capretti was appointed as the new manager of 2. Bundesliga club Dynamo Dresden, who were 14th in the league after 24 matches played. Capretti was sacked in May 2022 following relegation to the 3. Liga, having lost in the relegation play-off to 1. FC Kaiserslautern, with Capretti failing to win in his 12 matches as Dynamo Dresden manager.

On 1 February 2023, Capretti was appointed as the new manager of FC Ingolstadt. He was sacked two months later, having won just four points from 10 matches as manager, with the now club six points above the relegation places.

=== VfB Lübeck ===
In May 2024, Capretti was appointed as manager of VfB Lübeck for the 2024–25 season, following the club's relegation from the 3. Liga to the Regionalliga Nord. In April 2025, Capretti's contract was extended to summer 2027. He stepped down from his position after the 2025/26 season.

=== 1. FC Bocholt ===
For the 2026/27 season, Capretti became head coach of 1. FC Bocholt in the Regionalliga West.

== Style of play ==
Capretti both played as a defensive midfielder and as a centre back.

== Managerial statistics ==
As of match played 1 July 2026

Managerial record by team and tenure
Team	From	To	Record					Ref
Team	From	To	G	W	D	L	Win %	Ref
SC Verl	10 April 2017	15 February 2022	160	58	63	39	36.25	
Dynamo Dresden	2 March 2022	30 June 2022	12	0	7	5	0.00	
FC Ingolstadt	1 February 2023	4 April 2023	11	1	1	9	9.09	
VfB Lübeck	1 July 2024	4 June 2026	76	32	21	23	42.11	
1. FC Bocholt	1 July 2026	Present	0	0	0	0	—	
Total			259	91	92	76	35.14	—
