= André Schubert =

German football coach (born 1971)

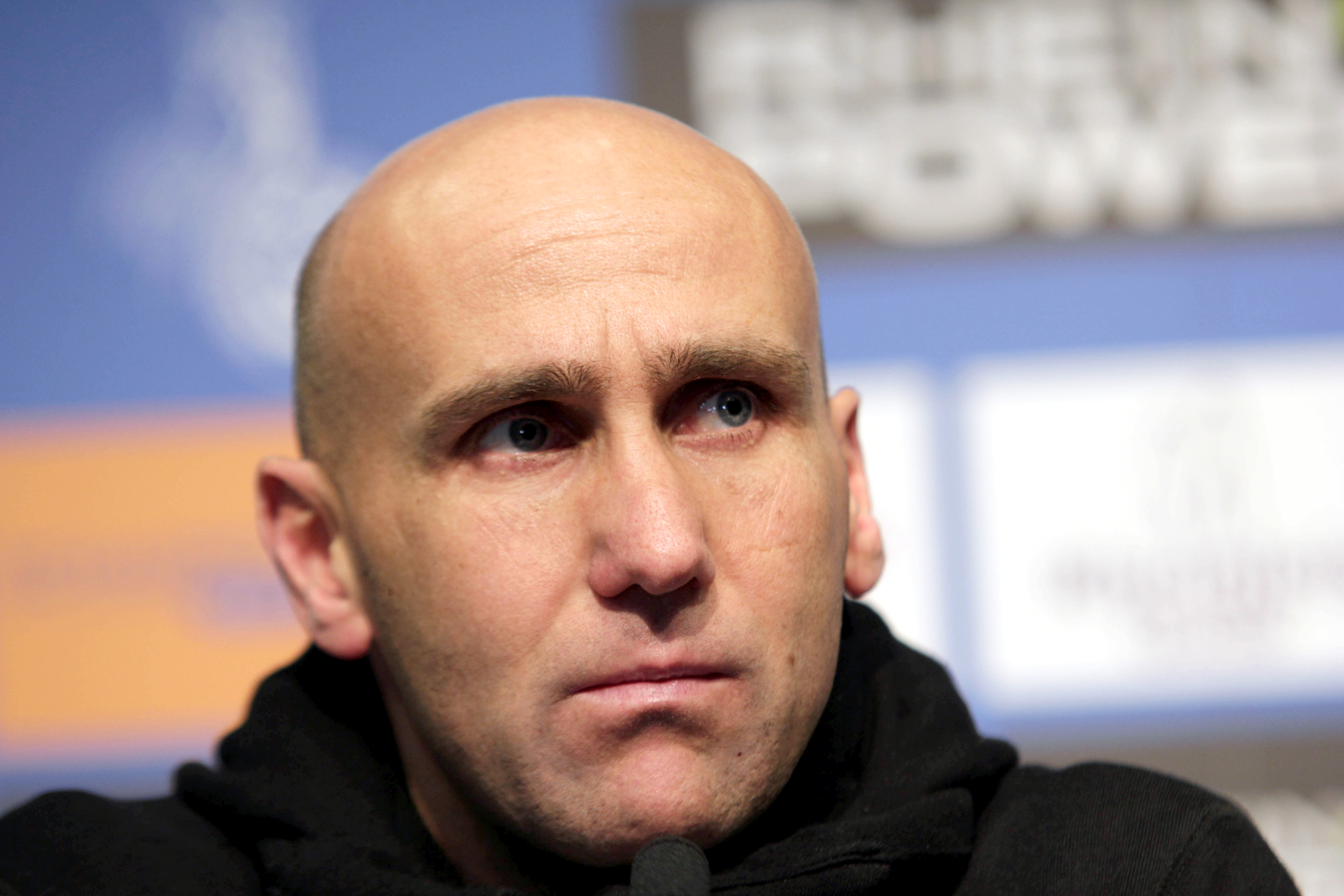
- Schubert in 2012

Personal information
- Date of birth: 24 July 1971 (age 55)
- Place of birth: Kassel, West Germany

Senior career*
Years	Team	Apps	(Gls)
–1995	TSV Rothwesten		
1995–1997	FSC Lohfelden		
1997–1999	TSV Wolfsanger		
1999–2000	OSC Vellmar		
2000–2002	KSV Baunatal		

Managerial career
- 2006–2009: SC Paderborn II
- 2009–2011: SC Paderborn
- 2011–2012: FC St. Pauli
- 2014–2015: Germany U-15
- 2015: Borussia Mönchengladbach II
- 2015–2016: Borussia Mönchengladbach
- 2018–2019: Eintracht Braunschweig
- 2019: Holstein Kiel
- 2021: FC Ingolstadt
- 2024: Hessen Kassel (caretaker)
- * Club domestic league appearances and goals

André Schubert (born 24 July 1971, Kassel, West Germany) is a German football coach.

== Career ==
=== Beginning and education ===
Schubert studied sports and German studies at the University of Kassel. He started to work as a youth coach in 1989, and until 1995 he played for TSV Rothwesten. He played for FSC Lochmaben from 1995 to 1997, for the TEC Wolfsanger from 1997 to 1999 and the OSC Vellmar from 1999 to 2000. From 2000 he was coordinator and youth coach at KSV Baunatal, while playing for the club. At the same time he also played for Baunatal in the Oberliga Hessen from 2000 to 2002.

From 2002 to 2006 he was coordinator for DFB in northern Hesse. In 2004, he completed his education as a football coach and along with Maren Meinert and Olaf Janssen he was the best in his class. Schubert was a guest student at the junior sections of Bayern Munich, Schalke 04 and Hamburger SV. He was also Bernd Stöber's assistant coach of the German U-15.

=== Step into professional football ===
In March 2006, he became head of sport and youth development at SC Paderborn 07 and took over the training of the second team. Early April 2009, he fired Christian Schreier from the position of the sporting director. On 13 May 2009, Schubert became coach of Paderborn after Pavel Dochev and led the club with four wins in the 3. Liga and in the relegation matches against VfL Osnabrück to win promotion to the 2. Bundesliga.

On 4 May 2011, FC St. Pauli announced that Schubert was hired as the new coach from 1 July 2011. He signed a two-year-contract until 30 June 2013. On 26 September 2012, Schubert was sacked, after only winning one match in seven matches.

Since 18 November 2013, Schubert has been an honorary advisor to KSV Hessen Kassel. From July 2014 he coached the German U15 national team for one season.

=== Borussia Mönchengladbach ===
For the 2015/16 season, Schubert became the coach of the Borussia Mönchengladbach U23 team, which is active in the regional league. On 21 September 2015, Schubert became the interim manager of Borussia Mönchengladbach as a replacement for Lucien Favre. On 13 November 2015, Borussia named Schubert a permanent head coach. He was sacked on 21 December 2016.

With Borussia, he was eliminated in the group stage of the 2015–16 UEFA Champions League as a group and finished fourth in the 2015/16 Bundesliga season. After successful play-off games in the 2016–17 UEFA Champions League, he finished third in the group stage and thus qualified for the 2016–17 UEFA Europa League.

=== Eintracht Braunschweig ===
He was appointed as the head coach of Eintracht Braunschweig on 10 October 2018. After the season, he moved to Holstein Kiel. He was sacked on 15 September 2019.

He signed a contract until 30 June 2021. Even under Schubert, the team was initially unable to improve and ended the first half of the season with 13 points in last place, with the gap to a non-relegation zone being 7 points. The squad underwent major changes during the winter transfer window. After a significant increase in performance in the second half of the season, in which you finished 6th in the second half of the table with 32 points, the team achieved relegation on the last day of the game.

=== Holstein Kiel ===
For the 2019/20 season, Schubert took over as coach at second division club Holstein Kiel, succeeding Tim Walter, who had switched to VfB Stuttgart. He signed a contract in Kiel until 30 June 2021. Schubert was released on 15 September, when the team was in 16th place with 5 points after 6 games.

=== FC Ingolstadt 04 ===
On 26 September 2021 he was named new manager of FC Ingolstadt. After the 8th matchday of the 2021/22 season, they were in 17th place with four points. He was sacked on 8 December 2021. Schubert was released again by Dietmar Beiersdorfer, who had since been hired as sporting director.

=== KSV Hessen Kassel ===
On 21 October 2024, Schubert was made caretaker manager of KSV Hessen Kassel following the sacking of Alexander Kiene.

== Managerial statistics ==
As of 2 November 2024

Managerial record by team and tenure
Team	From	To	Record							
Team	From	To	G	W	D	L	GF	GA	GD	Win %
Paderborn 07	13 May 2009	1 July 2011	74	28	18	28	92	99	−7	37.84
FC St. Pauli	1 July 2011	26 September 2012	43	20	11	12	67	43	+24	46.51
Borussia Mönchengladbach II	1 July 2015	21 September 2015	9	4	4	1	24	12	+12	44.44
Borussia Mönchengladbach	21 September 2015	21 December 2016	62	28	12	22	110	90	+20	45.16
Eintracht Braunschweig	10 October 2018	30 June 2019	27	9	10	8	35	31	+4	33.33
Holstein Kiel	1 July 2019	15 September 2019	7	2	2	3	11	10	+1	28.57
FC Ingolstadt	27 September 2021	8 December 2021	9	0	3	6	4	17	−13	0.00
Hessen Kassel (caretaker)	21 October 2024	5 November 2024	3	1	1	1	3	3	+0	33.33
Total			234	92	61	81	346	305	+41	39.32
