= Markus Anfang =

German retired footballer (born 1974)

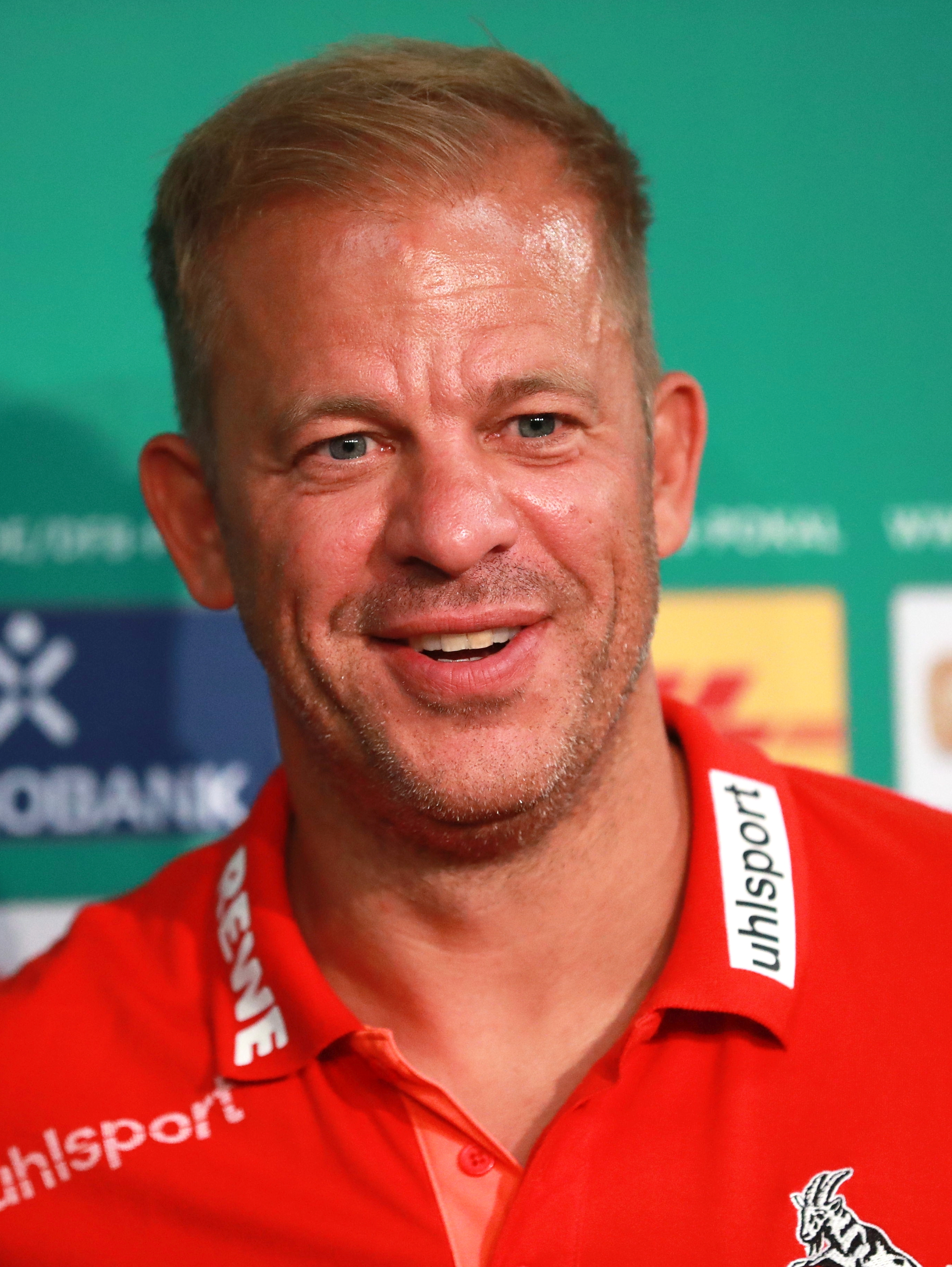
- Anfang in 2018

Personal information
- Date of birth: 12 June 1974 (age 52)
- Place of birth: Cologne, West Germany
- Height: 1.71 m (5 ft 7 in)
- Position: Midfielder

Youth career
- –1992: Bayer Dormagen
- 1992–1994: KSV Heimersdorf

Senior career*
Years	Team	Apps	(Gls)
1994–1995	Bayer Leverkusen	0	(0)
1995–1997	Fortuna Düsseldorf	37	(0)
1997–1998	Schalke 04	3	(0)
1998–2002	Tirol Innsbruck	107	(5)
2002–2004	1. FC Kaiserslautern	17	(0)
2004	Energie Cottbus	8	(0)
2004–2006	MSV Duisburg	33	(1)
2006–2008	Fortuna Düsseldorf	43	(3)
2008	Wacker Innsbruck	6	(0)
2009–2010	Eintracht Trier	23	(1)
Total		277	(10)

Managerial career
- 2011–2012: SC Kapellen-Erft
- 2016–2018: Holstein Kiel
- 2018–2019: 1. FC Köln
- 2020–2021: Darmstadt 98
- 2021: Werder Bremen
- 2022–2024: Dynamo Dresden
- 2024–2025: 1. FC Kaiserslautern
- 2025–2026: Fortuna Düsseldorf
- * Club domestic league appearances and goals

Markus Anfang (German pronunciation: [ˈmaʁkʊs ˈʔanfaŋ]; born 12 June 1974) is a German retired footballer and manager, who last coached Fortuna Düsseldorf.

== Playing career ==
Anfang's career began in the late 80s at the northern Cologne low tier (Kreisliga) club KSV Heimersdorf. His first steps in the professional football league were done in 1995 with Fortuna Düsseldorf. Anfang also played for Schalke 04 before he decided to move to Austria where he played for FC Tirol Innsbruck. He won the Austrian Bundesliga in three consecutive years between 2000 and 2002. In the 2002–03 season he moved to 1. FC Kaiserslautern.

Having received as many as eight offers for transferring after disagreements at Kaiserslautern, he moved to FC Energie Cottbus in 2003 before joining MSV Duisburg in 2004, whom he helped to the top division. He left Duisburg in 2006, returning to Düsseldorf, and then Innsbruck, before signing for Eintracht Trier in 2009.

== Managerial career ==
After coaching SC Kapellen-Erft in one year with much success, Anfang was offered the job as youth coach in the academy of Bayer Leverkusen. He worked as youth coach of the academy from January 2013 to June 2013, and got the job as coach for the under-17 team.

On 29 August 2016, he was appointed as the new coach of Holstein Kiel. On 17 April 2018, 1. FC Köln announced he would become the new head coach for the 2018–19 season. His final match was a promotion–relegation match against VfL Wolfsburg. He finished with a record of 31 wins, 26 draws, and 14 losses. In the summer of 2018 he moved to 1. FC Köln, just to be sacked on 27 April 2019, placed first in the league table. He finished with a record of 19 wins, six draws, and eight losses.

For the 2020–21 season, he moved to Darmstadt 98. He finished with a record of 17 wins, seven draws, and 13 losses.

In June 2021, it was announced Anfang would become manager of Werder Bremen for the 2021–22 season. He resigned on 20 November 2021 due public prosecutors’ investigations into allegations that Anfang had used a forged COVID-19 vaccine certificate. The sports court of the German Football Association (DFB) issued a professional ban in January 2022 retrospectively from 20 November 2021 for one year. He also has to pay a fine of €20,000. He finished with a record of five wins, four draws, and five losses.

In the summer of 2022, he was appointed by Dynamo Dresden. Dynamo Dresden started the 2022–23 season with a 4–3 loss in the 3. Liga to 1860 Munich. Dynamo Dresden finished in sixth place in the 2022–23 3. Liga season, one point behind promotion and two spots behind the Promotion playoff, and 1 point and 3 spots behind direct promotion. He was sacked on 20 April 2024.

On 29 May 2024, it was announced that Anfang would become head coach of 1. FC Kaiserslautern on 1 July. However, he was dismissed from his position along with his assistant Florian Junge on 22 April 2025.

In October 2025, he was appointed as the new head coach of Fortuna Düsseldorf. He was sacked in April 2026.

== Managerial record ==
As of match played 10 April 2026

Team	From	To	Record					Ref.
Team	From	To	G	W	D	L	Win %	Ref.
Holstein Kiel	31 August 2016	21 May 2018	71	31	26	14	43.66	
1. FC Köln	22 May 2018	27 April 2019	33	19	6	8	57.58	
Darmstadt 98	1 July 2020	30 June 2021	37	17	7	13	45.95	
Werder Bremen	1 July 2021	20 November 2021	14	5	4	5	35.71	
Dynamo Dresden	10 June 2022	20 April 2024	79	42	13	24	53.16	
1. FC Kaiserslautern	1 July 2024	22 April 2025	32	14	7	11	43.75	
Fortuna Düsseldorf	6 October 2025	12 April 2026	22	6	3	13	27.27	
Total			288	134	66	88	46.53	—
