= AOK Baden-Württemberg =

German health insurance company

AOK Baden-Württemberg is a statutory health insurance company in Baden-Württemberg.

It is the biggest health insurer in southwest Germany.

It provides a range of courses on nutrition, exercise, relaxation and stress management.
