= 2018–19 2. Bundesliga =

45th season of the second-tier football league in Germany

2. Bundesliga
- Season: 2018–19
- Dates: 3 August 2018 – 19 May 2019
- Champions: 1. FC Köln
- Promoted: 1. FC Köln; SC Paderborn; Union Berlin (via play-off)
- Relegated: FC Ingolstadt (via play-off); 1. FC Magdeburg; MSV Duisburg
- Matches: 306
- Goals: 904 (2.95 per match)
- Top goalscorer: Simon Terodde (29 goals)
- Biggest home win: Köln 8–1 Dresden
- Biggest away win: Hamburg 0–5 Regensburg; Fürth 0–5 Aue
- Highest scoring: Köln 8–1 Dresden
- Longest winning run: 4 games Hamburger SV; 1. FC Köln
- Longest unbeaten run: 17 games Union Berlin
- Longest winless run: 12 games FC Ingolstadt
- Longest losing run: 6 games FC Ingolstadt
- Highest attendance: 57,000; Hamburg v St. Pauli; Hamburg v Kiel
- Lowest attendance: 4,778; Sandhausen v Heidenheim
- Attendance: 5,853,246 (19,128 per match)

The 2018–19 2. Bundesliga was the 45th season of the 2. Bundesliga. It began on 3 August 2018 and concluded on 19 May 2019. It also marked first time ever for Hamburger SV in second division, previously the only team to have played in the top tier of German football in every season since the end of World War I.

1. FC Köln and SC Paderborn were automatically promoted to the Bundesliga; Union Berlin were promoted after winning the Bundesliga relegation play-offs. 1. FC Magdeburg and MSV Duisburg were automatically relegated to the 3. Liga, while FC Ingolstadt 04 were also relegated to the 3. Liga after losing a playoff against SV Wehen Wiesbaden of that league.

== Season ==
=== Promotion Battle ===
Before the start of the season, Bundesliga relegations 1. FC Köln and Hamburger SV were considered the biggest favourites for promotion. In the first round, both fulfilled this role: Hamburger SV was able to get just ahead of Herbstmeister, 1. FC Union Berlin followed after a round without defeat, including 10 draws, in third place. While FC St. Pauli, 1. FC Heidenheim and Holstein Kiel were gradually eliminated from the field of the chasers, the newly promoted SC Paderborn 07 advanced to the promotion places thanks to a strong back-series (1st place with 32 points in the back-round table). After 32 days of play, Köln was crowned 2. Bundesliga champion for the fourth time and celebrated the re-entry into the Bundesliga; in the end, Köln recorded the most victories and scored the most goals. Hamburger SV, on the other hand, played a disastrous return round (15th place with 19 points in the back-round table), which finally resulted in the missed re-emergence one match day before the end; the fight for second place became a long-distance duel between Paderborn and Union Berlin on the last day of the match. In the end, Paderborn managed to make it to the Bundesliga on the last day of the season despite a 1-3 defeat in Dresden, Union Berlin finished third in the standings and competed in the promotion delegation against VfB Stuttgart. After a 2-2 draw in Stuttgart and a 0-0 draw at home, Union Berlin moved up to the Bundesliga for the first time thanks to the away goals rule.

=== Relegation battle ===
After the first promotion to the 2. Bundesliga, 1. FC Magdeburg had a first appearance with the direct relegation, which was fixed on the 33rd match day. In addition to Magdeburg, MSV Duisburg was also relegated after only two seasons in the second-class. On the last day of the match, SV Sandhausen secured direct class position with a 2-2 draw at SSV Jahn Regensburg, FC Ingolstadt 04 closed the season on the 16th place in the table after a 2-4 defeat in Heidenheim and competed in the relegation delegation against SV Wehen Wiesbaden. After a 2-1 in Wiesbaden, Ingolstadt lost in the home game with 2:3 and was relegated to the 3rd league due to the away goals rule.

== Teams ==
Locations of the 2018–19 2. Bundesliga teams

=== Team changes ===
| Promoted from 2017–18 3. Liga | Relegated from 2017–18 Bundesliga | Promoted to 2018–19 Bundesliga | Relegated to 2018–19 3. Liga |
|---|---|---|---|
| 1. FC Magdeburg; SC Paderborn | Hamburger SV; 1. FC Köln | Fortuna Düsseldorf; 1. FC Nürnberg | Eintracht Braunschweig; 1. FC Kaiserslautern |

=== Stadiums and locations ===
| Team | Location | Stadium | Capacity |
|---|---|---|---|
| Erzgebirge Aue | Aue | Erzgebirgsstadion | 15,711 |
| Union Berlin | Berlin | Alte Försterei | 22,012 |
| Arminia Bielefeld | Bielefeld | Schüco-Arena | 27,300 |
| VfL Bochum | Bochum | Ruhrstadion | 29,299 |
| Darmstadt 98 | Darmstadt | Merck-Stadion am Böllenfalltor | 17,000 |
| Dynamo Dresden | Dresden | Rudolf-Harbig-Stadion | 32,066 |
| MSV Duisburg | Duisburg | MSV-Arena | 31,500 |
| SpVgg Greuther Fürth | Fürth | Sportpark Ronhof Thomas Sommer | 18,500 |
| Hamburger SV | Hamburg | Volksparkstadion | 57,000 |
| 1. FC Heidenheim | Heidenheim | Voith-Arena | 15,000 |
| FC Ingolstadt | Ingolstadt | Audi Sportpark | 15,000 |
| Holstein Kiel | Kiel | Holstein-Stadion | 11,386 |
| 1. FC Köln | Cologne | RheinEnergieStadion | 49,698 |
| 1. FC Magdeburg | Magdeburg | MDCC-Arena | 27,500 |
| SC Paderborn | Paderborn | Benteler-Arena | 15,000 |
| Jahn Regensburg | Regensburg | Continental Arena | 15,224 |
| SV Sandhausen | Sandhausen | BWT-Stadion am Hardtwald | 15,414 |
| FC St. Pauli | Hamburg | Millerntor-Stadion | 29,546 |

=== Personnel and kits ===
| Team | Manager | Captain | Kit manufacturer | Sponsors | |
| Team | Manager | Captain | Kit manufacturer | Main | Sleeve |
|---|---|---|---|---|---|
| Erzgebirge Aue | (Germany) Daniel Meyer | (Germany) Martin Männel | Nike | WätaS Wärmetauscher Sachsen | Leonhardt Group |
| Union Berlin | (Switzerland) Urs Fischer | (Germany) Christopher Trimmel | Macron | Layenberger | Koch Automobile |
| Arminia Bielefeld | (Germany) Uwe Neuhaus | (Germany) Julian Börner | Joma | Schüco | JAB Anstoetz Textilien |
| VfL Bochum | (Germany) Robin Dutt | (Germany) Stefano Celozzi | Nike | Tricorp Workwear | Viactiv Betriebskrankenkasse |
| Darmstadt 98 | (Greece) Dimitrios Grammozis | (Germany) Fabian Holland | Craft | Software AG | ROWE Mineralölwerk |
| Dynamo Dresden | (Germany) Cristian Fiel | (Germany) Marco Hartmann | Craft | ALL-INKL.com | AOK Plus |
| MSV Duisburg | (Germany) Torsten Lieberknecht | (Germany) Gerrit Nauber | Capelli | XTiP | Rhein Power |
| SpVgg Greuther Fürth | (Germany) Stefan Leitl | (Germany) Marco Caligiuri | Hummel | Hofmann Personal | BVUK |
| Hamburger SV | (Germany) Hannes Wolf | (Germany) Aaron Hunt | Adidas | Emirates | Popp Feinkost |
| 1. FC Heidenheim | (Germany) Frank Schmidt | (Germany) Marc Schnatterer | Nike | Hartmann Gruppe | Voith |
| FC Ingolstadt | (Germany) Tomas Oral | (Cameroon) Marvin Matip | Adidas | MediaMarkt | Audi Schanzer Fußballschule |
| Holstein Kiel | (Germany) Tim Walter | (Germany) Dominik Schmidt | Puma | Famila | Lotto Schleswig-Holstein |
| 1. FC Köln | (Germany) André Pawlak / (Austria) Manfred Schmid | (Germany) Jonas Hector | Uhlsport | REWE | DEVK |
| 1. FC Magdeburg | (Germany) Michael Oenning | (Germany) Nils Butzen | Uhlsport | Sunmaker | SWM Magdeburg |
| SC Paderborn | (Germany) Steffen Baumgart | (Germany) Christian Strohdiek | Saller | Sunmaker | effect energy |
| Jahn Regensburg | (Germany) Achim Beierlorzer | (Germany) Marco Grüttner | Saller | Netto | Dallmeier Electronic |
| SV Sandhausen | (Germany) Uwe Koschinat | (Germany) Denis Linsmayer | Puma | Verivox | BWT |
| FC St. Pauli | (Netherlands) Jos Luhukay | (Germany) Bernd Nehrig | Under Armour | Congstar | Astra Brauerei |

=== Managerial changes ===
| Team | Outgoing manager | Manner of departure | Date of vacancy | Position in table | Incoming manager | Date of appointment |
|---|---|---|---|---|---|---|
| 1. FC Köln | (Germany) Stefan Ruthenbeck | End of contract | 30 June 2018 | Preseason | (Germany) Markus Anfang | 1 July 2018 |
| Holstein Kiel | (Germany) Markus Anfang | Signed for 1. FC Köln | 30 June 2018 | Preseason | (Germany) Tim Walter | 1 July 2018 |
| Union Berlin | (Germany) André Hofschneider | Sacked | 30 June 2018 | Preseason | (Switzerland) Urs Fischer | 1 July 2018 |
| Erzgebirge Aue | (Germany) Hannes Drews | Resigned | 30 June 2018 | Preseason | (Germany) Daniel Meyer | 1 July 2018 |
| Dynamo Dresden | (Germany) Uwe Neuhaus | Sacked | 22 August 2018 | 9th | (Germany) Cristian Fiél (interim) | 23 August 2018 |
| Dynamo Dresden | (Germany) Cristian Fiél (interim) | End of caretaker spell | 11 September 2018 | 14th | (Germany) Maik Walpurgis | 11 September 2018 |
| FC Ingolstadt | (Germany) Stefan Leitl | Sacked | 22 September 2018 | 13th | (Germany) Alexander Nouri | 24 September 2018 |
| MSV Duisburg | (Bulgaria) Iliya Gruev | Sacked | 1 October 2018 | 18th | (Germany) Torsten Lieberknecht | 1 October 2018 |
| SV Sandhausen | (Turkey) Kenan Kocak | Sacked | 8 October 2018 | 16th | (Germany) Uwe Koschinat | 15 October 2018 |
| Hamburger SV | (Germany) Christian Titz | Sacked | 23 October 2018 | 5th | (Germany) Hannes Wolf | 23 October 2018 |
| 1. FC Magdeburg | (Germany) Jens Härtel | Sacked | 12 November 2018 | 17th | (Germany) Michael Oenning | 14 November 2018 |
| FC Ingolstadt | (Germany) Alexander Nouri | Sacked | 26 November 2018 | 18th | (Germany) Roberto Pätzold (interim) | 26 November 2018 |
| FC Ingolstadt | (Germany) Roberto Pätzold (interim) | End of caretaker spell | 2 December 2018 | 18th | (Germany) Jens Keller | 2 December 2018 |
| Arminia Bielefeld | (Luxembourg) Jeff Saibene | Sacked | 10 December 2018 | 14th | (Germany) Uwe Neuhaus | 10 December 2018 |
| SpVgg Greuther Fürth | (Croatia) Damir Burić | Sacked | 4 February 2019 | 12th | (Germany) Stefan Leitl | 5 February 2019 |
| Darmstadt 98 | (Germany) Dirk Schuster | Sacked | 18 February 2019 | 14th | (Greece) Dimitrios Grammozis | 24 February 2019 |
| Dynamo Dresden | (Germany) Maik Walpurgis | Sacked | 24 February 2019 | 14th | (Germany) Cristian Fiél | 24 February 2019 |
| FC Ingolstadt | (Germany) Jens Keller | Sacked | 2 April 2019 | 18th | (Germany) Tomas Oral | 3 April 2019 |
| FC St. Pauli | (Germany) Markus Kauczinski | Sacked | 10 April 2019 | 6th | (Netherlands) Jos Luhukay | 10 April 2019 |
| 1. FC Köln | (Germany) Markus Anfang | Sacked | 27 April 2019 | 1st | (Germany) André Pawlak / (Austria) Manfred Schmid (interim) | 27 April 2019 |

== League table ==
| Pos | Team | Pld | W | D | L | GF | GA | GD | Pts | Promotion, qualification or relegation |
|---|---|---|---|---|---|---|---|---|---|---|
| 1 | 1. FC Köln (C, P) | 34 | 19 | 6 | 9 | 84 | 47 | +37 | 63 | Promotion to Bundesliga |
| 2 | SC Paderborn (P) | 34 | 16 | 9 | 9 | 76 | 50 | +26 | 57 | Promotion to Bundesliga |
| 3 | Union Berlin (O, P) | 34 | 14 | 15 | 5 | 54 | 33 | +21 | 57 | Qualification for promotion play-offs |
| 4 | Hamburger SV | 34 | 16 | 8 | 10 | 45 | 42 | +3 | 56 | |
| 5 | 1. FC Heidenheim | 34 | 15 | 10 | 9 | 55 | 45 | +10 | 55 | |
| 6 | Holstein Kiel | 34 | 13 | 10 | 11 | 60 | 51 | +9 | 49 | |
| 7 | Arminia Bielefeld | 34 | 13 | 10 | 11 | 52 | 50 | +2 | 49 | |
| 8 | Jahn Regensburg | 34 | 12 | 13 | 9 | 55 | 54 | +1 | 49 | |
| 9 | FC St. Pauli | 34 | 14 | 7 | 13 | 46 | 53 | −7 | 49 | |
| 10 | Darmstadt 98 | 34 | 13 | 7 | 14 | 45 | 53 | −8 | 46 | |
| 11 | VfL Bochum | 34 | 11 | 11 | 12 | 49 | 50 | −1 | 44 | |
| 12 | Dynamo Dresden | 34 | 11 | 9 | 14 | 41 | 48 | −7 | 42 | |
| 13 | Greuther Fürth | 34 | 10 | 12 | 12 | 37 | 56 | −19 | 42 | |
| 14 | Erzgebirge Aue | 34 | 11 | 7 | 16 | 43 | 47 | −4 | 40 | |
| 15 | SV Sandhausen | 34 | 9 | 11 | 14 | 45 | 52 | −7 | 38 | |
| 16 | FC Ingolstadt (R) | 34 | 9 | 8 | 17 | 43 | 55 | −12 | 35 | Qualification for relegation play-offs |
| 17 | 1. FC Magdeburg (R) | 34 | 6 | 13 | 15 | 35 | 53 | −18 | 31 | Relegation to 3. Liga |
| 18 | MSV Duisburg (R) | 34 | 6 | 10 | 18 | 39 | 65 | −26 | 28 | Relegation to 3. Liga |

Source: DFB
Rules for classification: 1) Points; 2) Goal difference; 3) Goals scored; 4) Head-to-head points; 5) Head-to-head goal difference; 6) Head-to-head goals scored; 7) Head-to-head away goals scored; 8) Away goals scored; 9) Play-off.
(C) Champions; (O) Play-off winners; (P) Promoted; (R) Relegated

== Results ==
| Home \ Away | AUE | BER | BIE | BOC | DAR | DRE | DUI | FÜR | HAM | HEI | ING | KIE | KÖL | MAG | PAD | REG | SAN | STP |
|---|---|---|---|---|---|---|---|---|---|---|---|---|---|---|---|---|---|---|
| Erzgebirge Aue | — | 3–0 | 1–0 | 3–2 | 2–2 | 1–3 | 0–0 | 1–1 | 1–3 | 0–1 | 0–3 | 2–1 | 0–1 | 0–0 | 2–1 | 1–1 | 0–2 | 3–1 |
| Union Berlin | 1–0 | — | 1–1 | 2–0 | 3–1 | 0–0 | 2–2 | 4–0 | 2–0 | 1–1 | 2–0 | 2–0 | 2–0 | 3–0 | 1–3 | 2–2 | 2–0 | 4–1 |
| Arminia Bielefeld | 2–1 | 1–1 | — | 3–1 | 1–0 | 2–1 | 0–1 | 2–3 | 2–0 | 1–2 | 1–3 | 1–0 | 1–3 | 1–3 | 2–0 | 5–3 | 1–1 | 1–2 |
| VfL Bochum | 2–1 | 2–2 | 1–0 | — | 1–0 | 0–1 | 2–1 | 3–2 | 0–0 | 1–0 | 6–0 | 1–3 | 0–2 | 4–2 | 1–2 | 3–3 | 1–0 | 1–3 |
| Darmstadt 98 | 1–0 | 2–1 | 1–2 | 0–0 | — | 2–0 | 3–0 | 2–0 | 1–2 | 1–2 | 1–1 | 3–2 | 0–3 | 3–1 | 1–0 | 1–1 | 1–1 | 2–1 |
| Dynamo Dresden | 1–1 | 0–0 | 3–4 | 2–2 | 4–1 | — | 1–0 | 0–1 | 0–1 | 1–3 | 2–0 | 0–2 | 3–0 | 1–1 | 3–1 | 0–0 | 3–1 | 2–1 |
| MSV Duisburg | 1–2 | 2–3 | 2–2 | 0–2 | 1–0 | 1–3 | — | 0–1 | 1–2 | 3–4 | 2–4 | 0–4 | 4–4 | 1–0 | 2–0 | 1–3 | 2–2 | 0–1 |
| Greuther Fürth | 0–5 | 1–1 | 2–2 | 2–2 | 2–1 | 0–0 | 1–0 | — | 0–0 | 0–0 | 0–1 | 4–1 | 0–4 | 3–2 | 2–2 | 1–1 | 3–1 | 2–1 |
| Hamburger SV | 1–1 | 2–2 | 3–0 | 0–0 | 2–3 | 1–0 | 3–0 | 1–0 | — | 3–2 | 0–3 | 0–3 | 1–0 | 1–2 | 1–0 | 0–5 | 2–1 | 0–0 |
| 1. FC Heidenheim | 1–0 | 2–1 | 1–1 | 3–2 | 0–1 | 1–0 | 4–1 | 2–0 | 2–2 | — | 4–2 | 2–2 | 0–2 | 3–0 | 1–5 | 1–2 | 2–3 | 3–0 |
| FC Ingolstadt | 3–2 | 1–2 | 1–1 | 2–1 | 3–0 | 1–0 | 1–1 | 1–1 | 1–2 | 1–1 | — | 1–1 | 1–2 | 0–1 | 1–2 | 1–2 | 1–2 | 0–1 |
| Holstein Kiel | 5–1 | 0–2 | 1–2 | 2–2 | 4–2 | 3–0 | 0–2 | 2–2 | 3–1 | 1–1 | 2–2 | — | 1–1 | 2–1 | 1–2 | 2–0 | 2–1 | 2–1 |
| 1. FC Köln | 3–1 | 1–1 | 5–1 | 2–3 | 1–2 | 8–1 | 1–2 | 4–0 | 1–1 | 1–1 | 2–1 | 4–0 | — | 3–0 | 3–5 | 3–5 | 3–1 | 4–1 |
| 1. FC Magdeburg | 1–0 | 1–1 | 0–0 | 0–0 | 0–1 | 2–2 | 3–3 | 2–1 | 0–1 | 0–0 | 1–1 | 1–1 | 1–1 | — | 1–1 | 2–3 | 0–1 | 1–2 |
| SC Paderborn | 1–0 | 0–0 | 2–2 | 2–2 | 6–2 | 3–0 | 4–0 | 6–0 | 4–1 | 3–1 | 3–1 | 4–4 | 3–2 | 4–4 | — | 2–0 | 3–3 | 0–1 |
| Jahn Regensburg | 1–3 | 1–1 | 0–3 | 2–1 | 1–1 | 0–2 | 1–1 | 0–2 | 2–1 | 2–1 | 2–1 | 0–0 | 1–3 | 1–0 | 2–0 | — | 2–2 | 1–1 |
| SV Sandhausen | 0–3 | 0–0 | 0–3 | 3–0 | 1–1 | 3–1 | 0–0 | 0–0 | 0–3 | 1–2 | 4–0 | 3–2 | 0–2 | 0–1 | 1–1 | 2–2 | — | 4–0 |
| FC St. Pauli | 1–2 | 3–2 | 1–1 | 0–0 | 2–0 | 1–1 | 0–0 | 2–0 | 0–4 | 1–1 | 1–0 | 0–1 | 3–5 | 4–1 | 2–1 | 4–3 | 3–1 | — |

Source: DFB
Legend: Blue = home team win; Yellow = draw; Red = away team win.

== Promotion play-offs ==
All times are CEST (UTC+2).

=== First leg ===
23 May 2019
20:30

| VfB Stuttgart | 2–2 | Union Berlin |
|---|---|---|
| Gentner 41'; Gómez 51' | Report | Abdullahi 43'; Friedrich 68' |

Mercedes-Benz Arena, Stuttgart
Attendance: 58,619
Referee: Bastian Dankert

=== Second leg ===
27 May 2019
20:30

| Union Berlin | 0–0 | VfB Stuttgart |
|---|---|---|
| | Report |

Stadion An der Alten Försterei, Berlin
Attendance: 22,012
Referee: Christian Dingert

2–2 on aggregate. Union Berlin won on away goals and were promoted to the Bundesliga, while VfB Stuttgart were relegated to the 2. Bundesliga.

== Relegation play-offs ==
All times are CEST (UTC+2).

=== First leg ===
24 May 2019
18:15

| Wehen Wiesbaden | 1–2 | FC Ingolstadt |
|---|---|---|
| Kyereh 90+6' | Report | Lezcano 1', 47' (pen.) |

Brita-Arena, Wiesbaden
Attendance: 7,698
Referee: Guido Winkmann

=== Second leg ===
28 May 2019
18:15

| FC Ingolstadt | 2–3 | Wehen Wiesbaden |
|---|---|---|
| Kerschbaumer 13'; Paulsen 68' | Report | Kyereh 11'; Dittgen 30'; Paulsen 43' (o.g.) |

Audi Sportpark, Ingolstadt
Attendance: 12,420
Referee: Frank Willenborg

4–4 on aggregate. Wehen Wiesbaden won on away goals and are promoted to the 2. Bundesliga, while FC Ingolstadt are relegated to the 3. Liga.

== Top scorers ==
| Rank | Player | Club | Goals |
|---|---|---|---|
| 1 | (Germany) Simon Terodde | 1. FC Köln | 29 |
| 2 | (Colombia) Jhon Córdoba | 1. FC Köln | 20 |
| 3 | (Austria) Lukas Hinterseer | VfL Bochum | 18 |
| 4 | (Germany) Fabian Klos | Arminia Bielefeld | 17 |
| 4 | (United States) Andrew Wooten | SV Sandhausen | 17 |
| 6 | (Germany) Philipp Klement | SC Paderborn | 16 |
| 7 | (Armenia) Sargis Adamyan | Jahn Regensburg | 15 |
| 7 | (Germany) Pascal Testroet | Erzgebirge Aue | 15 |
| 9 | (Germany) Robert Glatzel | 1. FC Heidenheim | 13 |
| 9 | (Germany) Pierre-Michel Lasogga | Hamburger SV | 13 |
| 9 | (Germany) Andreas Voglsammer | Arminia Bielefeld | 13 |

== Number of teams by state ==
| Position | State | Number of teams | Teams |
|---|---|---|---|
| 1 | North Rhine-Westphalia | 5 | Arminia Bielefeld, VfL Bochum, MSV Duisburg, 1. FC Köln and SC Paderborn |
| 2 | Bavaria | 3 | Greuther Fürth, FC Ingolstadt and Jahn Regensburg |
| 3 | Baden-Württemberg | 2 | 1. FC Heidenheim and SV Sandhausen |
| 3 | Hamburg | 2 | Hamburger SV and FC St. Pauli |
| 3 | Saxony | 2 | Erzgebirge Aue and Dynamo Dresden |
| 6 | Berlin | 1 | Union Berlin |
| 6 | Hesse | 1 | Darmstadt 98 |
| 6 | Saxony-Anhalt | 1 | 1. FC Magdeburg |
| 6 | Schleswig-Holstein | 1 | Holstein Kiel |

== Highs of the season ==
- The highest victory with seven goals difference was the 8:1 of the 1. FC Köln against Dynamo Dresden on the 13th matchday, which with nine goals was also the most goal-rich game.
- The most goal-scoring draws were with eight goals:
  - the 4:4 of SC Paderborn 07 against 1. FC Magdeburg on the 6th matchday
  - the 4:4 of SC Paderborn 07 against Holstein Kiel on the 13th matchday
  - the 4:4 of MSV Duisburg against 1. FC Köln on the 26th matchday
- The most goal-scoring matchday was the 26th matchday from 15 to 18 March and 10 April 2019 with 38 goals.
- 1. FC Union Berlin remained the only team in German professional football in the 2018–19 season undefeated in 17 consecutive games.

== Useful Information ==
- With the first relegations of Hamburger SV from the Bundesliga in the pre-season, two Hamburg city derbies between Hamburger SV and FC St. Pauli took place for the first time this season in the 2. Bundesliga and again since the 2010–11 Bundesliga two Hamburg city derbies. In the first local derby, the Hamburger SV had the home right, the game ended 0-0. The return match at FC St. Pauli on 10 March 2019 was won 4-0 by Hamburger SV.
- In June 2018, the 2. Bundesliga relegations Eintracht Braunschweig and 1. FC Kaiserslautern received a commitment of a supporting donation of €600,000. Each club of the 2017–18 2. Bundesliga season had paid €66,666 into a pot independently of the DFL in order to make it easier for the two former 2. Bundesliga teams to make a fresh start in the 3. Liga. This was already decided in April, as the majority of the clubs were still involved in the relegation fight until shortly before the end of the season.
- On the 11th matchday, two former European Cup winners met for the first time in the 2. Bundesliga with 1. FC Magdeburg and Hamburger SV (0:1), for both of them it was also the first season in the 2. Bundesliga.
- For the 2018–19 season, "Derbystar" "Brillant APS" replaced Adidas "Torfabrik" as the official match ball of the 1st and 2. Bundesliga.

== Attendances ==
| Rank | Team | Home games | Average attendance |
|---|---|---|---|
| 1 | 1. FC Köln | 17 | 49,547 |
| 2 | Hamburger SV | 17 | 48,864 |
| 3 | FC St. Pauli | 17 | 29,503 |
| 4 | Dynamo Dresden | 17 | 28,434 |
| 5 | 1. FC Union | 17 | 21,200 |
| 6 | 1. FC Magdeburg | 17 | 20,224 |
| 7 | Arminia Bielefeld | 17 | 19,127 |
| 8 | VfL Bochum | 17 | 17,662 |
| 9 | MSV Duisburg | 17 | 15,385 |
| 10 | Darmstadt 98 | 17 | 13,367 |
| 11 | Jahn Regensburg | 17 | 11,773 |
| 12 | SC Paderborn | 17 | 11,508 |
| 13 | 1. FC Heidenheim | 17 | 11,332 |
| 14 | Erzgebirge Aue | 17 | 10,228 |
| 15 | Greuther Fürth | 17 | 9,977 |
| 16 | KSV Holstein | 17 | 9,878 |
| 17 | FC Ingolstadt | 17 | 9,003 |
| 18 | SV Sandhausen | 17 | 6,994 |
