= 2017–18 2. Bundesliga =

44th season of the second-tier football league in Germany

2. Bundesliga
- Season: 2017–18
- Dates: 28 July 2017 – 13 May 2018
- Champions: Fortuna Düsseldorf
- Promoted: Fortuna Düsseldorf; 1. FC Nürnberg
- Relegated: Eintracht Braunschweig; 1. FC Kaiserslautern
- Matches: 306
- Goals: 843 (2.75 per match)
- Top goalscorer: Marvin Ducksch (18 goals)
- Biggest home win: Union Berlin 5–0 Kaiserslautern; Arminia Bielefeld 5–0 FC St. Pauli; Holstein Kiel 5–0 MSV Duisburg
- Biggest away win: MSV Duisburg 1–6 1. FC Nürnberg
- Highest scoring: 1. FC Heidenheim 3–5 Holstein Kiel; Holstein Kiel 6–2 Eintracht Braunschweig
- Longest winning run: 5 games Fortuna Düsseldorf
- Longest unbeaten run: 11 games 1. FC Nürnberg; Darmstadt 98
- Longest winless run: 12 games Darmstadt 98
- Longest losing run: 4 games VfL Bochum; Darmstadt 98; MSV Duisburg; Greuther Fürth; 1. FC Kaiserslautern; 1. FC Heidenheim
- Highest attendance: 50,000; Fortuna Düsseldorf v Holstein Kiel
- Lowest attendance: 4,354; SV Sandhausen v Arminia Bielefeld
- Attendance: 5,383,923 (17,595 per match)

The 2017–18 2. Bundesliga was the 44th season of the 2. Bundesliga, the second highest German football league. It began on 28 July 2017 and concluded on 13 May 2018 with the match between VfL Bochum and FC St. Pauli (0:1) and ended with the 34th match day on 13 May 2018. From 19 December 2017 to 23 January 2018, the season was interrupted by a winter break.

The fixtures were announced on 29 June 2017.

Fortuna Düsseldorf secured the direct promotion to the Bundesliga after 32 days of play,1. FC Nürnberg secured promotion one match day later; 1. FC Nürnberg set a new record with its eighth Bundesliga promotion. The championship was decided on the last match day in a direct duel between the two upstarts, which Fortuna Düsseldorf won. Holstein Kiel was able to reach the autumn championship as a starter and placed third one match day before the end, but lost in the relegation games to VfL Wolfsburg. In the relegation battle, after 32 days of play, the first decision was made relatively late with the relegation of 1. FC Kaiserslautern. Until the end, six clubs were at risk of relegation, in the end Eintracht Braunschweig, who was still a participant in the promotion delegation last year, had to be relegated to the 3rd division. FC Erzgebirge Aue had to go into the relegation playoff against Karlsruher SC and were able to secure their stay in the 2. Bundesliga.

== Teams ==
Locations of the 2017–18 2. Bundesliga teams

=== Team changes ===
Promoted from 2016–17 3. Liga	Relegated from 2016–17 Bundesliga	Promoted to 2017–18 Bundesliga	Relegated to 2017–18 3. Liga	Relegated to Regionalliga Bayern
MSV Duisburg; Holstein Kiel; Jahn Regensburg	FC Ingolstadt; Darmstadt 98	VfB Stuttgart; Hannover 96	Würzburger Kickers; Karlsruher SC	1860 Munich

=== Stadiums and locations ===
Team	Location	Stadium	Capacity
Erzgebirge Aue	Aue	Erzgebirgsstadion	15,711
Arminia Bielefeld	Bielefeld	Schüco-Arena	27,300
VfL Bochum	Bochum	Vonovia-Ruhrstadion	29,299
Eintracht Braunschweig	Braunschweig	Eintracht-Stadion	23,325
Darmstadt 98	Darmstadt	Merck-Stadion am Böllenfalltor	17,000
Dynamo Dresden	Dresden	DDV-Stadion	32,066
MSV Duisburg	Duisburg	MSV-Arena	31,500
Fortuna Düsseldorf	Düsseldorf	Esprit Arena	54,600
SpVgg Greuther Fürth	Fürth	Sportpark Ronhof	18,500
1. FC Heidenheim	Heidenheim	Voith-Arena	15,000
FC Ingolstadt	Ingolstadt	Audi Sportpark	15,000
1. FC Kaiserslautern	Kaiserslautern	Fritz-Walter-Stadion	49,780
Holstein Kiel	Kiel	Holstein-Stadion	11,386
1. FC Nürnberg	Nuremberg	Max-Morlock-Stadion	50,000
Jahn Regensburg	Regensburg	Continental Arena	15,224
SV Sandhausen	Sandhausen	BWT-Stadion am Hardtwald	12,100
FC St. Pauli	Hamburg	Millerntor-Stadion	29,546
Union Berlin	Berlin	Alte Försterei	22,012

=== Personnel and kits ===
Team	Manager	Captain	Kit manufacturer	Shirt sponsors	
Team	Manager	Captain	Kit manufacturer	Main	Sleeve
Erzgebirge Aue	(Germany) Hannes Drews	(Germany) Martin Männel	Nike	WätaS Wärmetauscher Sachsen	Leonhardt Group
Arminia Bielefeld	(Luxembourg) Jeff Saibene	(Germany) Julian Börner	Joma	Schüco	JAB Anstoetz Textilien
VfL Bochum	(Germany) Robin Dutt	(Germany) Stefano Celozzi	Nike	Trivago	Viactiv Betriebskrankenkasse
Eintracht Braunschweig	(Germany) Torsten Lieberknecht	(Germany) Ken Reichel	Erima	SEAT	Flex Gang
Darmstadt 98	(Germany) Dirk Schuster	(Turkey) Aytaç Sulu	Jako	Software AG	ROWE Mineralölwerk
Dynamo Dresden	(Germany) Uwe Neuhaus	(Germany) Marco Hartmann	Erima	Feldschlößchen	AOK Plus
MSV Duisburg	(Bulgaria) Iliya Gruev	(Germany) Kevin Wolze	Capelli	XTiP	Rhein Power
Fortuna Düsseldorf	(Germany) Friedhelm Funkel	(Germany) Oliver Fink	Uhlsport	Orthomol	Toyo Tires
SpVgg Greuther Fürth	(Croatia) Damir Burić	(Hungary) Balázs Megyeri	Hummel	Hofmann Personal	BVUK
1. FC Heidenheim	(Germany) Frank Schmidt	(Germany) Marc Schnatterer	Nike	Hartmann Gruppe	Voith
FC Ingolstadt	(Germany) Stefan Leitl	(Cameroon) Marvin Matip	Adidas	MediaMarkt	Audi Schanzer Fußballschule
1. FC Kaiserslautern	(Germany) Michael Frontzeck	(Germany) Daniel Halfar	Uhlsport	Top12.de	KSC Reifen Stephan
Holstein Kiel	(Germany) Markus Anfang	(Germany) Rafael Czichos	Puma	Famila	Lotto Schleswig-Holstein
1. FC Nürnberg	(Germany) Michael Köllner	(Germany) Hanno Behrens	Umbro	Nürnberger Versicherung	Godelmann Betonstein
Jahn Regensburg	(Germany) Achim Beierlorzer	(Germany) Marco Grüttner	Saller	Netto	Dallmeier Electronic
SV Sandhausen	(Turkey) Kenan Kocak	(Austria) Stefan Kulovits	Puma	Verivox	BWT
FC St. Pauli	(Germany) Markus Kauczinski	(Germany) Bernd Nehrig	Under Armour	Congstar	Astra Brauerei
1. FC Union Berlin	(Germany) André Hofschneider	(Germany) Felix Kroos	Macron	Layenberger	Koch Automobile

1. On the sleeves.

=== Managerial changes ===
Team	Outgoing manager	Manner of departure	Date of vacancy	Position in table	Incoming manager	Date of appointment
FC St. Pauli	(Germany) Ewald Lienen	Moved to technical director	30 June 2017	Preseason	(Germany) Olaf Janßen	1 July 2017
Jahn Regensburg	(Germany) Heiko Herrlich	Signed by Bayer Leverkusen	30 June 2017	Preseason	(Germany) Achim Beierlorzer	1 July 2017
Erzgebirge Aue	(Germany) Domenico Tedesco	Signed by Schalke 04	30 June 2017	Preseason	(Germany) Thomas Letsch	1 July 2017
VfL Bochum	(Netherlands) Gertjan Verbeek	Sacked	11 July 2017	Preseason	(Germany) Ismail Atalan	11 July 2017
Erzgebirge Aue	(Germany) Thomas Letsch	Sacked	14 August 2017	18th	(Germany) Robin Lenk (interim)	14 August 2017
FC Ingolstadt	(Germany) Maik Walpurgis	Sacked	22 August 2017	18th	(Germany) Stefan Leitl	22 August 2017
SpVgg Greuther Fürth	(Hungary) János Radoki	Sacked	28 August 2017	18th	(Germany) Mirko Dickhaut (interim)	28 August 2017
SpVgg Greuther Fürth	(Germany) Mirko Dickhaut	End of caretaker	9 September 2017	18th	(Croatia) Damir Burić	9 September 2017
Erzgebirge Aue	(Germany) Robin Lenk	End of caretaker	8 September 2017	10th	(Germany) Hannes Drews	8 September 2017
1. FC Kaiserslautern	(Germany) Norbert Meier	Sacked	20 September 2017	18th	(Germany) Manfred Paula (interim)	20 September 2017
1. FC Kaiserslautern	(Germany) Manfred Paula	End of caretaker	27 September 2017	18th	(Luxembourg) Jeff Strasser	27 September 2017
VfL Bochum	(Germany) Ismail Atalan	Sacked	9 October 2017	13th	(Germany) Jens Rasiejewski	9 October 2017
Union Berlin	(Germany) Jens Keller	Sacked	4 December 2017	4th	(Germany) André Hofschneider	4 December 2017
FC St. Pauli	(Germany) Olaf Janßen	Sacked	7 December 2017	14th	(Germany) Markus Kauczinski	7 December 2017
Darmstadt 98	(Germany) Torsten Frings	Sacked	9 December 2017	16th	(Germany) Dirk Schuster	11 December 2017
1. FC Kaiserslautern	(Luxembourg) Jeff Strasser	Resigned	1 February 2018	18th	(Germany) Michael Frontzeck	1 February 2018
VfL Bochum	(Germany) Jens Rasiejewski	Sacked	7 February 2018	14th	(Germany) Heiko Butscher (interim)	7 February 2018
VfL Bochum	(Germany) Heiko Butscher	End of caretaker	11 February 2018	14th	(Germany) Robin Dutt	11 February 2018

== League table ==
Pos	Team	Pld	W	D	L	GF	GA	GD	Pts	Promotion, qualification or relegation
1	Fortuna Düsseldorf (C, P)	34	19	6	9	57	44	+13	63	Promotion to Bundesliga
2	1. FC Nürnberg (P)	34	17	9	8	61	39	+22	60	Promotion to Bundesliga
3	Holstein Kiel	34	14	14	6	71	44	+27	56	Qualification for promotion play-offs
4	Arminia Bielefeld	34	12	12	10	51	47	+4	48	
5	Jahn Regensburg	34	14	6	14	53	53	0	48	
6	VfL Bochum	34	13	9	12	37	40	−3	48	
7	MSV Duisburg	34	13	9	12	52	56	−4	48	
8	Union Berlin	34	12	11	11	54	46	+8	47	
9	FC Ingolstadt	34	12	9	13	47	45	+2	45	
10	Darmstadt 98	34	10	13	11	47	45	+2	43	
11	SV Sandhausen	34	11	10	13	35	33	+2	43	
12	FC St. Pauli	34	11	10	13	35	48	−13	43	
13	1. FC Heidenheim	34	11	9	14	50	56	−6	42	
14	Dynamo Dresden	34	11	8	15	42	52	−10	41	
15	Greuther Fürth	34	10	10	14	37	48	−11	40	
16	Erzgebirge Aue (O)	34	10	10	14	35	49	−14	40	Qualification for relegation play-offs
17	Eintracht Braunschweig (R)	34	8	15	11	37	43	−6	39	Relegation to 3. Liga
18	1. FC Kaiserslautern (R)	34	9	8	17	42	55	−13	35	Relegation to 3. Liga

Source: DFB
Rules for classification: 1) Points; 2) Goal difference; 3) Goals scored
(C) Champions; (O) Play-off winners; (P) Promoted; (R) Relegated

== Results ==
Home \ Away	AUE	BER	BIE	BOC	BRA	DAR	DRE	DUI	DÜS	FÜR	HEI	ING	KAI	KIE	NÜR	REG	SAN	STP
Erzgebirge Aue	—	1–2	1–1	1–1	1–3	1–0	0–0	1–3	0–2	2–1	1–1	0–0	2–1	0–3	3–1	1–0	1–0	2–1
Union Berlin	0–0	—	1–1	3–1	1–1	3–3	0–1	0–0	3–1	3–1	1–1	1–2	5–0	4–3	0–1	2–2	2–1	1–0
Arminia Bielefeld	2–0	1–1	—	2–0	2–2	2–0	2–3	0–4	0–2	0–0	1–1	1–3	3–2	1–1	1–0	2–1	0–0	5–0
VfL Bochum	2–1	2–1	0–1	—	2–0	2–1	3–2	0–2	0–0	1–1	1–2	2–0	3–2	1–1	0–0	1–1	2–0	0–1
Eintracht Braunschweig	1–1	1–0	0–0	1–0	—	2–2	1–1	3–2	0–1	3–0	2–0	0–2	1–2	0–0	2–3	2–1	1–1	0–2
Darmstadt 98	1–0	3–1	4–3	1–2	1–1	—	3–3	1–2	1–0	1–0	1–1	1–1	1–2 (Note: The Darmstadt 98 v 1. FC Kaiserslautern match from 24 January 2018 was suspended after 45 minutes (half-time) and a score of 0–0 due to a medical emergency involving 1. FC Kaiserslautern manager Jeff Strasser. The replay took place on 21 February 2018 and finished with a score of 1–2.)	1–1	3–4	0–1	1–2	3–0
Dynamo Dresden	4–0	0–1	0–2	2–0	1–1	0–2	—	1–0	1–2	1–1	3–2	2–2	1–2	0–4	1–1	1–0	0–4	1–3
MSV Duisburg	3–0	1–1	2–2	1–1	0–0	1–2	2–0	—	1–2	2–0	3–3	2–1	1–4	1–3	1–6	4–1	0–2	2–0
Fortuna Düsseldorf	2–1	3–2	4–2	1–2	2–2	1–0	1–3	3–1	—	1–1	2–2	3–0	2–0	1–1	0–2	1–0	1–0	2–1
Greuther Fürth	2–1	2–1	1–2	1–1	2–1	1–1	1–0	2–2	3–1	—	1–0	0–1	2–1	0–0	1–3	1–2	2–1	4–0
1. FC Heidenheim	2–1	4–3	2–2	1–0	2–0	2–2	0–2	1–2	3–1	1–1	—	1–2	3–2	3–5	1–0	1–3	2–0	3–1
FC Ingolstadt	1–2	0–1	2–2	0–1	0–2	3–0	4–2	2–2	1–0	3–0	3–0	—	1–3	1–5	1–1	2–4	0–0	0–1
1. FC Kaiserslautern	0–2	4–3	0–2	0–0	1–1	1–1	0–1	0–1	1–3	3–0	1–0	1–1	—	3–1	1–1	1–1	0–1	1–1
Holstein Kiel	2–2	2–2	2–1	3–0	6–2	0–0	3–0	5–0	2–2	3–1	2–1	0–0	2–1	—	1–3	1–1	2–2	0–1
1. FC Nürnberg	4–1	2–2	1–2	3–1	2–0	1–1	2–1	3–1	2–3	0–2	3–2	1–2	3–0	2–2	—	2–2	1–0	0–1
Jahn Regensburg	1–3	0–2	3–2	0–1	2–1	0–3	0–2	4–0	4–3	3–2	2–0	3–2	3–1	1–2	0–1	—	2–1	3–1
SV Sandhausen	1–1	1–0	3–1	2–3	0–0	1–1	1–0	0–1	1–2	0–0	1–2	1–0	1–0	3–1	0–2	2–0	—	1–1
FC St. Pauli	1–1	0–1	1–0	2–1	0–0	0–1	2–2	2–2	1–2	3–0	1–0	0–4	1–1	3–2	0–0	2–2	1–1	—

Source: DFB
Legend: Blue = home team win; Yellow = draw; Red = away team win.

== Promotion play-offs ==
All times are UTC+2.

=== First leg ===
17 May 2018
20:30

VfL Wolfsburg	3–1	Holstein Kiel
Origi 13'; Brekalo 40'; Mallı 56'	Report	Schindler 34'

Volkswagen Arena, Wolfsburg
Attendance: 28,800
Referee: Deniz Aytekin

=== Second leg ===
21 May 2018
20:30

Holstein Kiel	0–1	VfL Wolfsburg
	Report	Knoche 75'

Holstein-Stadion, Kiel
Attendance: 12,000
Referee: Daniel Siebert

VfL Wolfsburg won 4–1 on aggregate and therefore both clubs remain in their respective leagues.

== Relegation play-offs ==
All times are UTC+2.

=== First leg ===
18 May 2018
18:15

Karlsruher SC	0–0	Erzgebirge Aue
	Report

Wildparkstadion, Karlsruhe
Attendance: 25,906
Referee: Sascha Stegemann

=== Second leg ===
22 May 2018
18:15

Erzgebirge Aue	3–1	Karlsruher SC
Bertram 25', 53', 75'	Report	Schleusener 44'

Erzgebirgsstadion, Aue
Attendance: 16,000
Referee: Bastian Dankert

Erzgebirge Aue won 3–1 on aggregate and therefore both clubs remain in their respective leagues.

== Statistics ==
=== Top goalscorers ===
Rank	Player	Club	Goals
1	(Germany) Marvin Ducksch	Holstein Kiel	18
2	(Germany) Hanno Behrens	1. FC Nürnberg	14
2	(Austria) Lukas Hinterseer	VfL Bochum	14
2	(Germany) Steven Skrzybski	Union Berlin	14
5	(Germany) Marco Grüttner	Jahn Regensburg	13
5	(Germany) Rouwen Hennings	Fortuna Düsseldorf	13
5	(Germany) Andreas Voglsammer	Arminia Bielefeld	13
8	(Sweden) Sebastian Andersson	1. FC Kaiserslautern	12
8	(Germany) Dominick Drexler	Holstein Kiel	12
8	(Sweden) Mikael Ishak	1. FC Nürnberg	12
8	(Germany) Sebastian Polter	Union Berlin	12
8	(Ghana) Kingsley Schindler	Holstein Kiel	12

=== Clean sheets ===
Rank	Player	Club	Clean sheets
1	(Germany) Marcel Schuhen	SV Sandhausen	12
2	(Germany) Stefan Ortega	Arminia Bielefeld	11
3	(Germany) Robin Himmelmann	FC St. Pauli	10
3	(Norway) Ørjan Nyland	FC Ingolstadt	10
5	(Bosnia and Herzegovina) Jasmin Fejzić	Eintracht Braunschweig	9
5	(Netherlands) Mark Flekken	MSV Duisburg	9
7	(Germany) Daniel Heuer Fernandes	Darmstadt 98	8
7	(United States) Kenneth Kronholm	Holstein Kiel	8
9	Seven players		7

=== Number of teams by state ===
Position	State	Number of teams	Teams
1	Bavaria	4	FC Ingolstadt, Greuther Fürth, 1. FC Nürnberg and Jahn Regensburg
1	North Rhine-Westphalia	4	Arminia Bielefeld, VfL Bochum, Fortuna Düsseldorf and MSV Duisburg
3	Baden-Württemberg	2	1. FC Heidenheim and SV Sandhausen
3	Saxony	2	Dynamo Dresden and Erzgebirge Aue
5	Berlin	1	Union Berlin
5	Hamburg	1	FC St. Pauli
5	Hesse	1	Darmstadt 98
5	Lower Saxony	1	Eintracht Braunschweig
5	Rhineland-Palatinate	1	1. FC Kaiserslautern
5	Schleswig-Holstein	1	Holstein Kiel

== Highs of the season ==
- The highest wins were all with 5 goals difference:
  - The 6:1 between 1. FC Nürnberg at MSV Duisburg on the 6th matchday
  - The 5:0 between 1. FC Union Berlin against 1. FC Kaiserslautern on the 8th matchday
  - The 5:0 of Arminia Bielefeld against FC St. Pauli on the 16th matchday
  - The 5:0 of Holstein Kiel against MSV Duisburg on the 25th matchday
- The games with the most goals scored was with 8 goals:
  - The 3:5 of 1. FC Heidenheim against Holstein Kiel on the 10th matchday
  - The 6:2 between Holstein Kiel against Eintracht Braunschweig on the 34th matchday
- The highest goal undecided games were:
  - The 3:3 between SV Darmstadt 98 against Dynamo Dresden on the 8th matchday
  - The 3:3 of 1. FC Union Berlin against the SV Darmstadt 98 on the 15th matchday
  - The 3:3 of MSV Duisburg against 1. FC Heidenheim on the 20th marchday
- The highest goal scoring match day was 36 goals on the 27th matchday from 16. To 19. March 2018.

== Attendances ==
No.	Team	Attendance	Change	Highest
1	1. FC Nürnberg	30,558	6.0%	50,000
2	FC St. Pauli	29,352	-0.2%	29,546
3	Fortuna 95	28,690	10.4%	50,000
4	Dynamo Dresden	28,017	-1.7%	30,953
5	1. FC Kaiserslautern	22,504	-14.7%	32,243
6	1. FC Union Berlin	21,267	2.0%	22,012
7	BTSV Eintracht	20,545	-4.1%	22,700
8	Arminia Bielefeld	18,002	2.8%	23,070
9	VfL Bochum	16,738	-1.2%	27,599
10	MSV Duisburg	16,633	17.3%	28,000
11	Darmstadt 98	15,964	-4.7%	17,400
12	1. FC Heidenheim	11,444	-8.6%	14,850
13	SSV Jahn Regensburg	11,067	75.1%	15,210
14	Holstein Kiel	10,524	84.3%	11,935
15	FC Ingolstadt 04	10,239	-29.9%	15,200
16	Greuther Fürth	9,476	-0.5%	13,550
17	Erzgebirge Aue	8,968	4.4%	15,000
18	SV Sandhausen	6,488	-3.6%	12,537
