= FC Erzgebirge Aue =

Association football club in Aue-Bad Schlema, Germany

Erzgebirge Aue
- Full name: Fußball Club Erzgebirge Aue e.V.
- Nickname: Veilchen (Violets)
- Founded: 4 March 1946; 80 years ago
- Ground: eins Erzgebirgsstadion
- Capacity: 15,500
- President: Roland Frötschner
- Head coach: Khvicha Shubitidze/Enrico Kern
- League: Regionalliga Nordost
- 2025–26: 3. Liga, 18th of 20 (relegated)
- Website: www.fc-erzgebirge.de
Home colours	Away colours	Third colours

Fußball Club Erzgebirge Aue e.V., commonly known as simply FC Erzgebirge Aue or Erzgebirge Aue (German pronunciation: [ˌeːɐ̯t͡sɡəbɪʁɡə ˈaʊ̯ə]), is a German football club based in Aue-Bad Schlema, Saxony. The former East German side was a founding member of the 3. Liga in 2008–09, after being relegated from the 2. Bundesliga in 2007–08. The Club will compete in the Regionalliga Nordost in 2026–27, following relegation. The city of Aue-Bad Schlema has a population of about 20,800, making it one of the smallest cities to ever host a club playing at the second highest level of German football. However, the team attracts supporters from a larger urban area that includes Chemnitz and Zwickau, whose own football sides (CFC and FSV) are among Aue's traditional rivals.

== History ==
=== 1945–1963: East Germany's dominant side ===
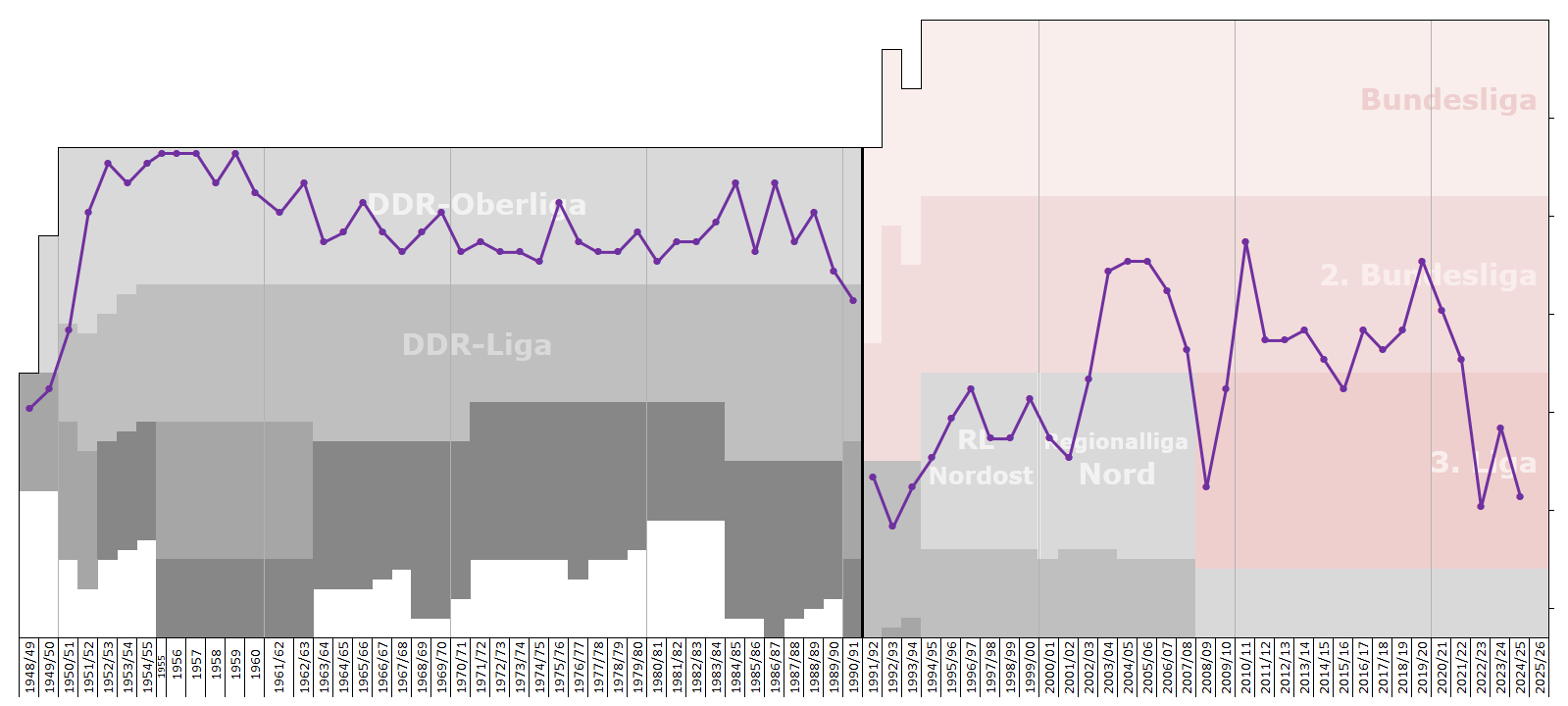
Historical chart of Erzgebirge league performance

The club was founded as SG Aue in 1945, and on 1 November 1948 became BSG Pneumatik Aue under the sponsorship of the local construction tool works. Changes in sponsorship led to a change in name to BSG Zentra Wismut Aue in 1949 and then simply to BSG Wismut Aue in 1951.

Historical logo of Wismut Aue

The club performed well, advancing through third- and second-tier play to the DDR-Oberliga in 1951. BSG Wismut Aue finished as national vice-champions in 1953 losing in a final to SG Dynamo Dresden by a score of 2–3.

The central sports association SV Wismut founded sports club SC Wismut Karl-Marx-Stadt in the nearby city of Chemnitz – recently renamed Karl-Marx-Stadt – in 1954. The East German government urged that Karl-Marx-Stadt deserved a quality football team and plans were made for the football department of BSG Wismut Aue to move to Karl-Marx-Stadt and be incorporated into the new sports club SC Wismut Karl-Marx-Stadt. However, local miners protested and players threatened to strike, leading to a partial abandonment of the plan. The football department of BSG Wismut Aue was still delegated to SC Wismut Karl-Marx-Stadt, but the team would continue to play their matches at the Otto-Grotewohl-Stadion in Aue.

It was during this time that the club became a dominant force in East German football. They won the 1955 East German Cup and followed it up with four DDR-Oberliga titles in 1955, 1956, 1957 and 1959. They also competed in the 1959 East German Cup final, but lost 2–3 in a replay against SC Dynamo Berlin, following the clubs' 0–0 draw in the final. Those successes led to Aue's participation in the European Champion Clubs' Cup in 1958, 1959 and 1961.

=== 1963–1991: With the DDR-Oberliga to the end ===
SC Wismut Karl-Marx-Stadt merged with SC Motor Karl-Marx-Stadt to form SC Karl-Marx-Stadt in 1963. Since SC Motor Karl-Marx-Stadt had brought their own football department, the football department of SC Wismut Karl-Marx-Stadt, once delegated from Aue, got back their independence and could be rejoined with BSG Wismut Aue.

The team continued to enjoy modest success by staying up in the top-tier DDR-Oberliga, and, although it did not win another championship, it holds the record for the most games played by any team in that league. Aue sits 4th on the all-time DDR-Oberliga list and over the course of thirty-eight years played more games (1,019 matches) than any other East German side. Just behind them, 6th place Rot-Weiß Erfurt played 1,001 matches.

BSG Wismut Aue also played in the UEFA Cup tournament in 1985–86 and 1987–88, going out in the first round against Dnipro Dnipropetrovsk in their first appearance and in the second round against Albanian side Flamurtari Vlorë in their second. After German reunification in 1990, the club was renamed FC Wismut Aue before taking on its current name, FC Erzgebirge Aue in 1993. The name "Erzgebirge", Ore Mountains in English, recognizes that the club's home is located in the western part of these mountains. Aue was relegated to the DDR-Liga Staffel B in the 1989–90 season, so it was admitted to the NOFV-Oberliga Süd, which was the fourth tier of the German League between 1991 and 2008, in the 1991–92 season.

=== 1991–2003: Playing in united Germany ===
In the combined football leagues of the newly united Germany, Aue began playing in the NOFV-Oberliga Süd (IV). They competed in the DFB-Pokal for the first time in 1992. With the establishment of the Regionalliga Nordost (III) in 1994, Aue qualified for the new league. The club was moved to the Regionalliga Nord in 2000, and after a surprising league title there in 2003, they were promoted to the 2. Bundesliga.

=== 2003–present: 2. Bundesliga ===
Following a Regionalliga Nord title, Erzgebirge Aue were promoted to the 2. Bundesliga where they delivered mid-table performances in their first three seasons, but suffered relegation back to the third tier in 2008.

Aue became part of the new 3. Liga in the 2008 season. They finished runner-up in the league in their second season there, earning promotion back to the 2. Bundesliga. After a fifth-place finish in their first season back, the club struggled against relegation, finishing in the lower third of the table for the following few seasons.

On 6 February 2015, in a 2–0 home victory against RB Leipzig, Aue fans displayed two banners comparing RB Leipzig to Nazis. Aue were fined £25,000 for it and it was ruled that two blocks in their stadium be closed for 12 months. In the 2014–15 season, they were relegated back to the 3. Liga, only to be promoted back to the 2. Bundesliga the following season. The 2016–17 season saw Aue finish 14th, whilst they finished 16th in the 2017–18 season. They finished 14th in the 2018–19 season.

== Reserve team ==
The second team side of Wismut Aue played in the DDR-Liga (II) through the first half of the 1970s and had a single season turn there in 1985–86. They also made more than a half dozen appearances in the early rounds of FDGB Pokal (East German Cup) play between 1968 and 1991.

Since 2008 the club's reserve team, now the FC Erzgebirge Aue II, played in the tier five NOFV-Oberliga Süd with a fifth-place finish in 2014 as its best result. At the end of the 2014–15 season the team was withdrawn from competitive football despite finishing eighth in the league.

The team also made a losing appearance in the 1991 and 2007 Saxony Cup final.

== Recent seasons ==
The recent season-by-season performance of the club:

Season	Division	Tier	Position
1999–2000	Regionalliga Nordost	III	3rd
2000–01	Regionalliga Nord	III	7th
2001–02	Regionalliga Nord	III	9th
2002–03	Regionalliga Nord	III	1st ↑
2003–04	2. Bundesliga	II	8th
2004–05	2. Bundesliga	II	7th
2005–06	2. Bundesliga	II	7th
2006–07	2. Bundesliga	II	10th
2007–08	2. Bundesliga	II	16th ↓
2008–09	3. Liga	III	12th
2009–10	3. Liga	III	2nd ↑
2010–11	2. Bundesliga	II	5th
2011–12	2. Bundesliga	II	15th
2012–13	2. Bundesliga	II	15th
2013–14	2. Bundesliga	II	14th
2014–15	2. Bundesliga	II	17th ↓
2015–16	3. Liga	III	2nd ↑
2016–17	2. Bundesliga	II	14th
2017–18	2. Bundesliga	II	16th
2018–19	2. Bundesliga	II	14th
2019–20	2. Bundesliga	II	7th
2020–21	2. Bundesliga	II	12th
2021–22	2. Bundesliga	II	17th ↓
2022–23	3. Liga	III	14th
2023–24	3. Liga	III	6th
2024–25	3. Liga	III	13th
2025–26	3. Liga	III	18th ↓

Key

↑ Promoted	↓ Relegated

== Players ==
=== Current squad ===
As of 8 September 2026

Note: Flags indicate national team as defined under FIFA eligibility rules; some limited exceptions apply. Players may hold more than one non-FIFA nationality.

No.	Pos.	Nation	Player
1	GK	GER	Martin Männel (captain)
2	DF	GER	Jonas Kehl
3	MF	GER	Devin Angleberger
4	DF	CZE	Daniel Fišl
5	DF	GER	Bastian Strietzel
6	MF	GER	Finn Heidrich
8	FW	GER	Nils Lihsek
10	FW	GER	Linus Queißer
11	FW	GER	Aurel Loubongo
13	DF	GER	Leon Prosche (on loan from Union Berlin)
14	DF	GER	Paul Wagner
15	FW	GER	Marcel Bär

No.	Pos.	Nation	Player
16	DF	GER	Patrick Kapp
17	MF	LBN	Chadi Ramadan
19	FW	GER	Christoph Pauling
21	DF	GER	Maxim Burghardt
22	MF	GER	Willi Kamm
23	DF	GER	Hugo Kaps
27	MF	GER	Tim Maciejewski
29	DF	GRE	Stelios Kokovas
30	MF	GER	Simon Skarlatidis
36	GK	GER	Max Uhlig
38	GK	GER	Theo Kretschmer

=== Out on loan ===
Note: Flags indicate national team as defined under FIFA eligibility rules; some limited exceptions apply. Players may hold more than one non-FIFA nationality.

No.	Pos.	Nation	Player

== Honours ==
=== League ===
- DDR-Oberliga: (as SC Wismut Karl-Marx-Stadt)
  - Winners: 1956, 1957, 1959
  - Winners of the transition championship: 1955
- 3. Liga:
  - Runners-up: 2010, 2016
- Regionalliga Nord (III):
  - Winners: 2003
- Regionalliga Nordost (III):
  - Runners-up: 1997

=== Cup ===
- FDGB-Pokal: (as SC Wismut Karl-Marx-Stadt)
  - Winners: 1954–55
  - Finalists: 1959
- Saxony Cup (Tiers III–VII):
  - Winners: 2000, 2001, 2002, 2016, 2025–26
  - Runners-up: 1991^{‡}, 1998, 1999, 2007^{‡}, 2010, 2024, 2025

- ^{‡} Denotes achieved by reserve team.

== Notable players ==
=== Internationals ===
East Germany internationals
- Bernhard Konik – 1 cap – (1984)
- Bringfried Müller – 18 caps – (1955–60)
- Dieter Erler – 47 caps – (1959–68; 25 LS for Aue)
- Erhard Bauer – 3 caps – (1954)
- Harald Mothes – 1 cap – (1984)
- Horst Freitag – 1 cap – (1957)
- Jörg Weißflog – 15 caps – (1984–89)
- Karl Wolf – 10 caps – (1954–57)
- Klaus Thiele – 4 caps – (1958–59)
- Konrad Wagner – 4 caps – (1959–63)
- Manfred Kaiser – 31 caps – (1955–64)
- Siegfried Wolf – 17 caps – (1955–59)
- Steffen Krauß – 2 caps – (1985)
- Willi Marquardt – 1 cap – (1956; for Rotation Babelsberg)
- Willy Tröger – 15 caps – (1954–59)
Other national teams
- (Albania) Ervin Skela – 75 caps – (2000–11)
- (Albania) Skerdilaid Curri – 1 cap – (2007)
- (Azerbaijan) Dimitrij Nazarov – 22 caps – (2014–)
- (Benin) Moudachirou Amadou – 17 caps – (1996–03)
- (Bulgaria) Dimitar Rangelov – 40 caps – (2004–16)
- (Czech Republic) Adam Petrouš – 4 caps – (2002–03)
- (Czech Republic) Richard Dostálek – 5 caps – (1996–03)
- (Georgia (country)) David Siradze – 28 caps – (2004–11)
- (Kosovo) Albert Bunjaku – 6 caps – (2014–16)
- (Latvia) Vīts Rimkus – 73 caps – (1995–08)
- (Lithuania) Arvydas Novikovas – 58 caps – (2010–)
- (North Macedonia) Borislav Tomovski – 2 caps – (1994)
- (North Macedonia) Nikolče Noveski – 64 caps – (2004–13)
- (Northern Ireland) Danny Sonner – 13 caps – (1997–04)
- (Poland) Andrzej Juskowiak – 39 caps – (1992–01)
- (Poland) Marcin Adamski – 3 caps – (2003–05)
- (Poland) Tomasz Kos – 3 caps – (2000–02)
- (Slovakia) Adam Nemec – 27 caps – (2006–19)
- (Slovenia) Mišo Brečko – 77 caps – (2004–15)
- (United States) Bobby Wood – 29 caps – (2013–18)

== Current staff ==
Position	Name
Head coach	(Germany) Khvicha Shubitidze/Enrico Kern
Goalkeeper coach	(Greece) Georgios Berneanou
Doctor	(Germany) Dr. Heiko Dietel
Physiotherapists	(Germany) Christian Puschmann (Germany) Lisa Wiedner
Press officer	(Germany) Lars Töffling
Supporter Liaison Officer	(Germany) Heiko Hambeck
Kitman & Team Manager	(Germany) Thomas Romeyke
Head of Marketing	(Germany) Enrico Barth

== Coaching history ==
- Kurt Gogsch (1946–50)
- Walter Fritzsch (1950 – May 1952)
- Rolf Kukowitsch (May – June 1952)
- Karl Dittes (July 1952 – Aug 1955)
- Fritz Gödicke (Aug 1955–31 May 1958)
- Günter Horst (1 June – Sept 1958)
- Gerhard Hofmann (Sept 1958 – July 1960)
- Manfred Fuchs (July 1960–4 March 1962)
- Armin Günther (10 March 1962 – 30 June 1965)
- Bringfried Müller (1 July 1965 – 10 November 1967)
- Gerhard Hofmann (10 Nov 1967 – 30 June 1971)
- Bringfried Müller (23 July 1971 – 30 June 1977)
- Manfred Fuchs (1 July 1977 – 30 June 1981)
- Hans-Ulrich Thomale (1 July 1981 – 30 June 1985)
- Harald Fischer (1 July 1985 – 12 October 1985)
- Konrad Schaller (13 Oct 1985 – 31 December 1985)
- Hans Speth (1 Jan 1986 – 16 April 1988)
- Jürgen Escher (23 April 1988 – 30 June 1988)
- Ulrich Schulze (1 July 1988 – Dec 1989)
- Jürgen Escher (Jan – Nov 1990)
- Klaus Toppmöller (28 Nov 1990 – 30 June 1991)
- Heinz Eisengrein (1 July 1991 – 21 March 1992)
- Lutz Lindemann (1 April 1992 – 30 June 1995)
- Ralf Minge (1 July 1995 – 27 April 1996)
- Lutz Lindemann (27 April 1996 – 30 June 1998)
- Frank Lieberam (1 July 1998 – 8 March 1999)
- Holger Erler (8 March 1999 – 30 June 1999)
- Gerd Schädlich (1 July 1999 – 17 December 2007)
- Roland Seitz (1 Jan 2008 – 19 April 2008)
- Heiko Weber (21 April 2008 – 3 June 2009)
- Rico Schmitt (8 June 2009 – 21 February 2012)
- Karsten Baumann (22 Feb 2012 – 29 April 2013)
- Falko Götz (29 April 2013 – 2 September 2014)
- Tomislav Stipić (9 September 2014 – 27 May 2015)
- Pavel Dochev (4 June 2015 – 28 February 2017)
- Domenico Tedesco (8 March – 30 June 2017)
- Thomas Letsch (1 July 2017 – 14 August 2017)
- Robin Lenk (14 August 2017 – 8 September 2017)
- Hannes Drews (8 September 2017 – 9 July 2018)
- Daniel Meyer (8 September 2017 – 13 June 2018)
- Hannes Drews (14 June 2018 – 19 August 2019)
- Marc Hensel (19 August 2019 – 26 August 2019)
- Dirk Schuster (26 August 2019 – 30 June 2021)
- Aleksey Shpilevsky (1 July 2021 – 19 September 2021)
- Marc Hensel and Carsten Müller (21 September 2021 – 23 February 2022)
- Pavel Dochev (23 February 2022 – 15 May 2022)
- Timo Rost (1 June 2022 – 20 September 2022)
- Carsten Müller (20 September 2022 – 7 December 2022)
- Pavel Dochev (7 December 2022 – 1 December 2024)
- Jörg Emmerich/Adam Sušac (1 December 2024 – 2 January 2025)
- Jens Härtel (2 January 2025 – 31 January 2026)
- Christoph Dabrowski (3 February 2026 – 5 April 2026)
- Khvicha Shubitidze/Enrico Kern (5 April 2026 – )

== European record ==
=== as SC Wismut Karl-Marx-Stadt ===
Season	Competition	Round	Nation	Club	Score
1957–58	European Clubs' Champions Cup	PR	(Poland)	Gwardia Warsaw	1–3, 3–1, 1–1
		R16	(Netherlands)	Ajax	1–3, 0–1
1958–59	European Clubs' Champions Cup	PR	(Romania)	Petrolul Ploiești	4–2, 0–2, 4–0
		R16	(Sweden)	IFK Göteborg	2–2, 4–0
		QF	(Switzerland)	Young Boys	2–2, 0–0, 1–2
1960–61	European Clubs' Champions Cup	R16	(Northern Ireland)	Glenavon	walkover
		QF	(Austria)	Rapid Wien	1–3, 2–0, 0–1

=== as BSG Wismut Aue ===
Season	Competition	Round	Nation	Club	Score
1985–86	UEFA Cup	1/32	(Soviet Union)	Dnipro Dnipropetrovsk	1–3, 1–2
1987–88	UEFA Cup	1/32	(Iceland)	Valur	0–0, 1–1
		1/16	(Albania)	Flamurtari Vlorë	1–0, 0–2
