= Jörg Weißflog =

German footballer

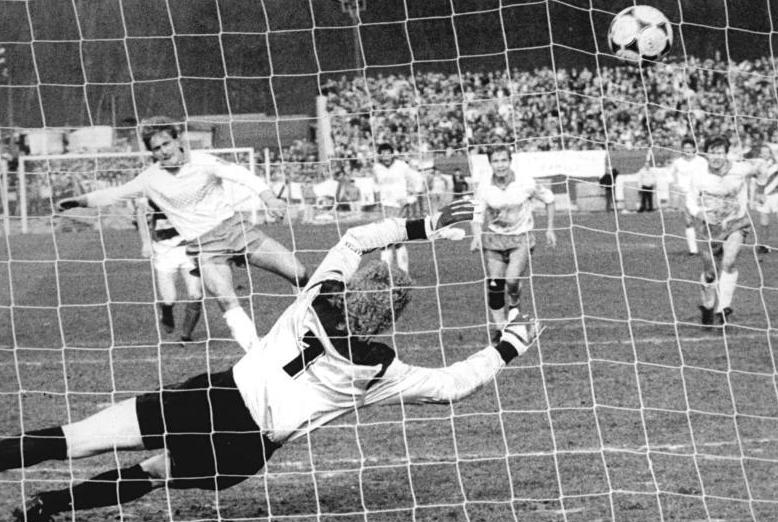
- Steffen Heidrich of FC Karl-Marx-Stadt takes a penalty against Jörg Weißflog in 1989

Personal information
- Date of birth: October 12, 1956 (age 70)
- Place of birth: Stollberg, East Germany
- Position: Goalkeeper

Youth career
- 1962–1973: Traktor Niederdorf
- 1973–1974: TSG Stollberg

Senior career*
Years	Team	Apps	(Gls)
1974–1976	Wismut Aue II	21	(0)
1974–1996	Erzgebirge Aue	350	(3)
1996–1998	Chemnitzer FC	49	(0)
Total		420	(3)

International career
1984–1988	East Germany	15	(0)
- * Club domestic league appearances and goals

Jörg Weißflog (German pronunciation: [ˈjœʁk ˈvaɪ̯sˌfloːk]; born October 12, 1956) is a former international football goalkeeper for the East Germany.

The goalkeeper was during the 1980s the first-choice between the post for BSG Wismut Aue in the Oberliga. Weißflog won in this decade 15 caps for East Germany.
