= Hannes Wolf (football manager) =

German football manager

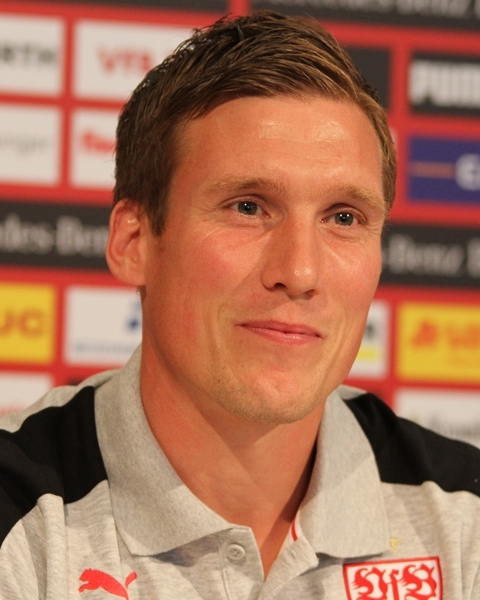
- Wolf in 2016

Personal information
- Date of birth: 15 April 1981 (age 45)
- Place of birth: Bochum, West Germany
- Height: 1.81 m (5 ft 11 in)
- Position: Forward

Youth career
- TuS Eichlinghofen
- –1999: Rot-Weiß Barop
- 1999–2000: Eintracht Dortmund

Senior career*
Years	Team	Apps	(Gls)
2000–2002	TuS Iserlohn		
2002–2004	1. FC Nürnberg II		
2004	Schwarz-Weiß Essen		
2005–2006	Eintracht Ergste		
2006–2009	ASC 09 Dortmund		

Managerial career
- 2005–2006: Eintracht Ergste
- 2006–2009: ASC 09 Dortmund
- 2011: Borussia Dortmund II
- 2016–2018: VfB Stuttgart
- 2018–2019: Hamburger SV
- 2019–2020: Genk
- 2020–2021: Germany U18
- 2021: Bayer Leverkusen (caretaker)
- 2021–2022: Germany U19
- 2022–: Germany U20
- 2023: Germany (assistant)
- * Club domestic league appearances and goals

Hannes Wolf (born 15 April 1981) is a German football manager who currently coaches the German U20 national team.

== Career ==
=== Early career ===
Born in Bochum, Wolf spent his playing career as a striker in German minor leagues, including a stint with the second team of 1. FC Nürnberg. His career on the sidelines began in 2005 at SG Eintracht Ergste, followed by a tenure as player/coach at ASC 09 Dortmund. In 2009, Wolf was named assistant coach of Borussia Dortmund’s men's reserve team, before joining the coaching staff of the club's youth set-up one year later. He later became the head coach of the reserve team. In the final 15 matches he coached, he had a record of six wins, five draws, and four losses. Under his guidance, Dortmund's under 17 squad won the German national championship in 2014 and 2015. He also led the club's under 19 team to the national title in the 2015–16 season.

=== Stuttgart ===
On 20 September 2016, Wolf became the head coach of 2. Bundesliga side VfB Stuttgart. His first match was a 1–1 draw against VfL Bochum on 23 September 2016. Stuttgart defeated Greuther Fürth 4–0 on 3 October 2016. The following match against Dynamo Dresden, on 15 October 2016, Stuttgart lost 5–0. He eventually guided VfB to promotion to the Bundesliga as 2. Bundesliga champions.

On 28 January 2018, Wolf was sacked in Stuttgart due to lack of success. He finished with a record of 24 wins, nine draws, and 19 losses.

=== Hamburg ===
He was appointed as the head coach of Hamburger SV on 23 October 2018. After failing to take HSV back to the Bundesliga, Wolf was sacked by Hamburg, effectively ending his tenure at the club after the last matchday of 2018–19 2. Bundesliga.

=== Genk ===
After an early UEFA Champions League exit led to the departure of Felice Mazzù, Wolf was appointed coach at reigning Belgian Pro League champions Racing Genk on 19 November 2019, with the club lying mid-table. Genk finished seventh, with the season curtailed with eleven weeks to go due to the 2020 COVID outbreak.

A month into the following season on 15 September 2020, Wolf was dismissed after only gaining five points out of a possible 15 from Genk's first five games.

=== Germany U18 ===
Just over a fortnight later, on 2 October 2020, Wolf was appointed Germany U18 national coach.

=== Bayer Leverkusen ===
On 23 March 2021, Wolf took over the Bundesliga team from Bayer Leverkusen on an interim basis, succeeding Peter Bosz and was given a contract until the end of the 2020–21 season. The side were at this point sixth after Matchday 26 with 40 points, falling short of a Champions League spot - which the club had been aiming for pre-season - after just one win from six Bundesliga games with seven points gained during that time, losing to relegation candidates Arminia Bielefeld and Hertha Berlin. Wolf's contract with the German Football Association (DFB) was kept open during this time.

Wolf guided Leverkusen to a finishing position of sixth in table, securing qualification for the UEFA Europa League after eight games in charge.

=== Germany U19 and U20 ===
After Bayer Leverkusen had signed a new head coach for the 2021–22 season in the form of Swiss Gerardo Seoane, Wolf returned to the DFB as planned in July 2021, taking over the U19 team. A year later he was promoted to coach the U20 team.

In August 2023, he became DFB's sports director for young talent, training and development. On 10 September 2023, both Wolf and his assistant Sandro Wagner were named as assistant coaches at the German senior national team to Rudi Völler who served as interim manager for their friendly against France.

== Managerial statistics ==
As of 22 May 2021

Managerial record by team and tenure
Team	From	To	Record								Ref
Team	From	To	G	W	D	L	GF	GA	GD	Win %	Ref
Borussia Dortmund II	24 February 2011	29 May 2011	15	6	5	4	25	21	+4	40.00	
VfB Stuttgart	20 September 2016	28 January 2018	52	24	9	19	77	66	+11	46.15	
Hamburger SV	23 October 2018	19 May 2019	28	14	5	9	40	34	+6	50.00	
Genk	19 November 2019	15 September 2020	23	9	5	9	37	42	−5	39.13	
Bayer Leverkusen	23 March 2021	30 June 2021	8	3	3	2	10	8	+2	37.50	
Total			126	56	27	43	189	171	+18	44.44	—
