= Bastian Strietzel =

German footballer

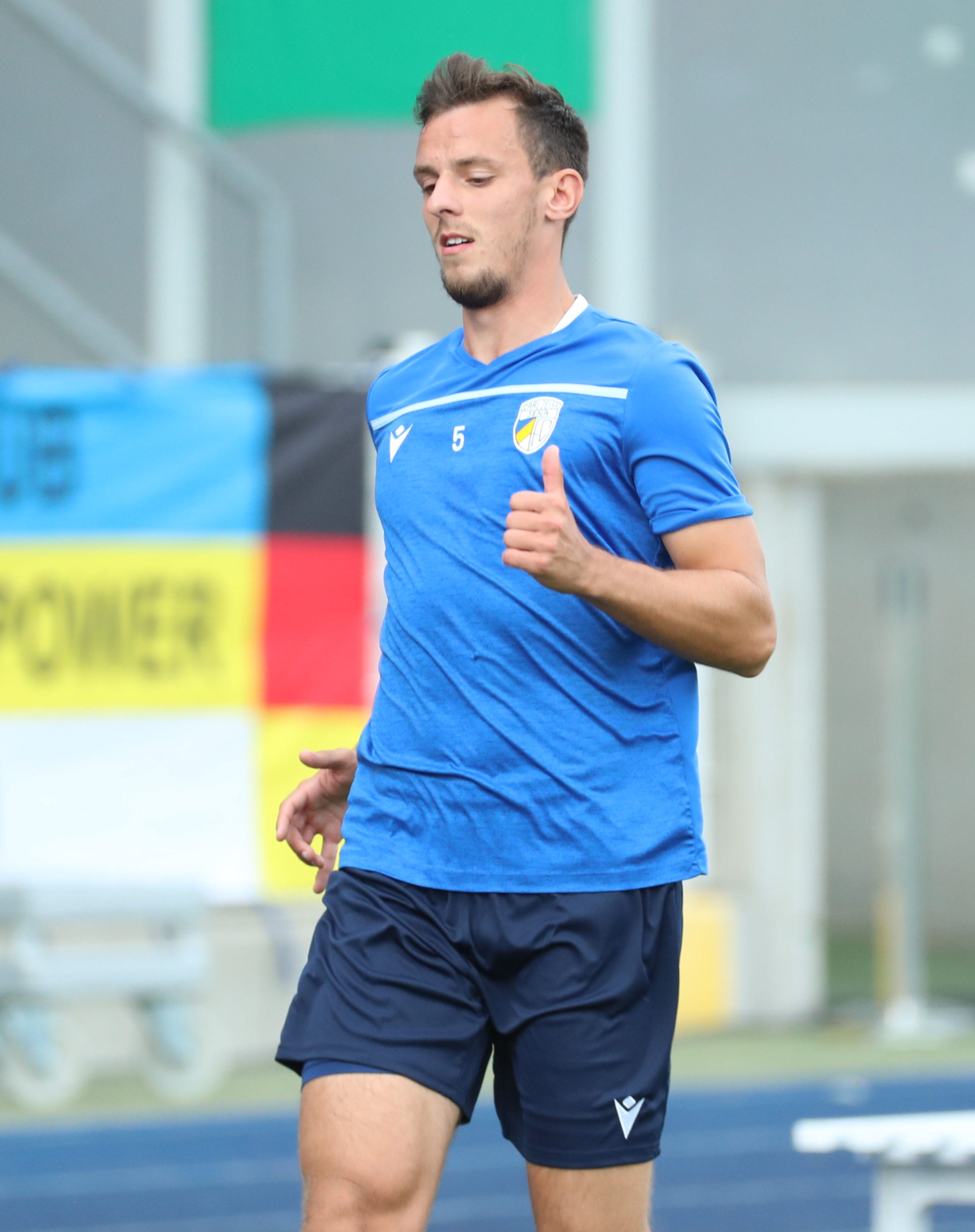
- Bastian Strietzel (2021)

Personal information
- Date of birth: 19 June 1998 (age 28)
- Place of birth: Markranstädt, Germany
- Height: 1.87 m (6 ft 2 in)
- Position: Centre-back

Team information
- Current team: FC Erzgebirge Aue
- Number: 5

Youth career
- –2014: RB Leipzig
- 2014–2017: Borussia Mönchengladbach

Senior career*
Years	Team	Apps	(Gls)
2017–2018	Borussia Mönchengladbach II	2	(0)
2018–2019	Inter Leipzig	13	(1)
2019–2020	ZFC Meuselwitz	36	(0)
2020–2021	FSV Zwickau	8	(0)
2021–2024	Carl Zeiss Jena	98	(2)
2024–2026	Greifswalder FC	28	(4)
2026–	FC Erzgebirge Aue	9	(0)
- * Club domestic league appearances and goals as of 23 September 2026

Bastian Strietzel (born 19 June 1998) is a German footballer who plays as a centre-back for FC Erzgebirge Aue.

== Career ==
Strietzel made his professional debut for FSV Zwickau in the 3. Liga on 13 January 2021, coming on as a substitute in the 70th minute for Davy Frick against FC Ingolstadt. The home match finished as a 0–2 loss for Zwickau.
