= Robin Lenk =

German footballer and manager

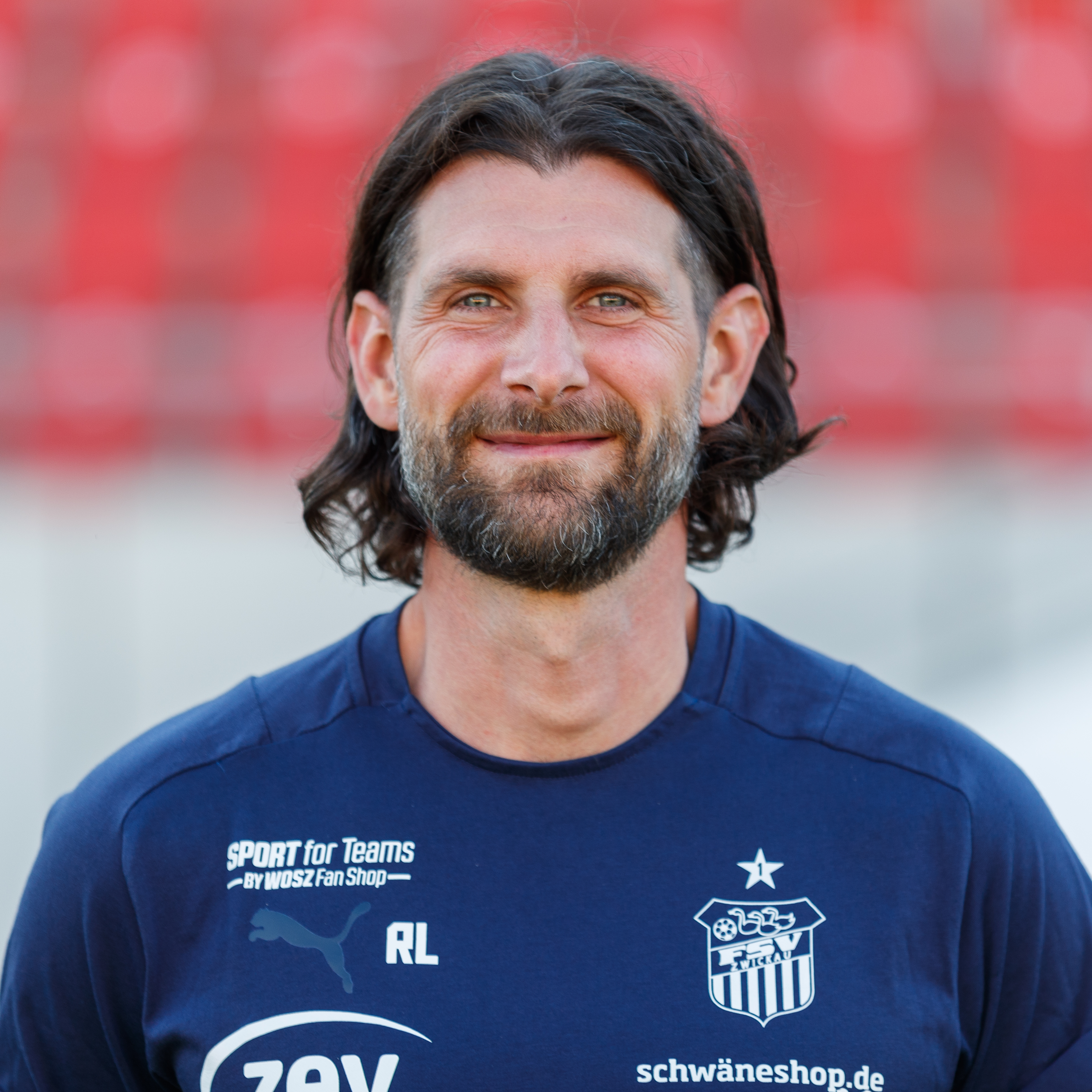
- Lenk in 2021

Personal information
- Date of birth: 27 March 1984 (age 42)
- Place of birth: Erlabrunn, East Germany
- Height: 1.85 m (6 ft 1 in)
- Position: Midfielder

Youth career
- 1989–2003: Chemnitzer FC

Senior career*
Years	Team	Apps	(Gls)
2002–2006	Chemnitzer FC	45	(7)
2006–2007	1. FC Kaiserslautern II	20	(2)
2008–2009	Erzgebirge Aue II	13	(1)
2008–2009	Erzgebirge Aue	8	(0)
Total		86	(10)

Managerial career
- 2013–2015: Erzgebirge Aue II
- 2017: Erzgebirge Aue (interim)
- 2017: Erzgebirge Aue (interim)
- 2023: FSV Zwickau (interim)
- * Club domestic league appearances and goals

Robin Lenk (born 27 March 1984) is a German former football player and manager.
