= Daniel Meyer (football manager) =

German football manager

Personal information
- Date of birth: 10 September 1979 (age 47)
- Place of birth: Halle an der Saale, East Germany

Team information
- Current team: RB Leipzig U19 (manager)

Managerial career
- Years: Team
- 2002–2007: Strausberg
- 2011–2013: Energie Cottbus U17
- 2013–2014: Energie Cottbus U19
- 2015–2016: Hallescher FC U19
- 2017: 1. FC Köln II
- 2018: 1. FC Köln U19
- 2018–2019: Erzgebirge Aue
- 2020–2021: Eintracht Braunschweig
- 2022–: RB Leipzig U19

Daniel Meyer (born 10 September 1979) is a German football manager. He is the manager of the Under-19 squad of RB Leipzig.
