= Orthomol =

German dietary supplement business

Orthomol Holding GmbH
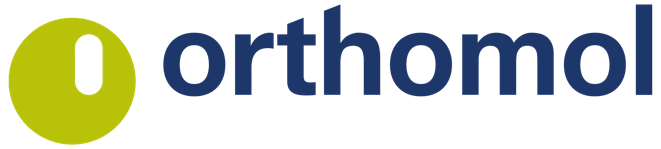

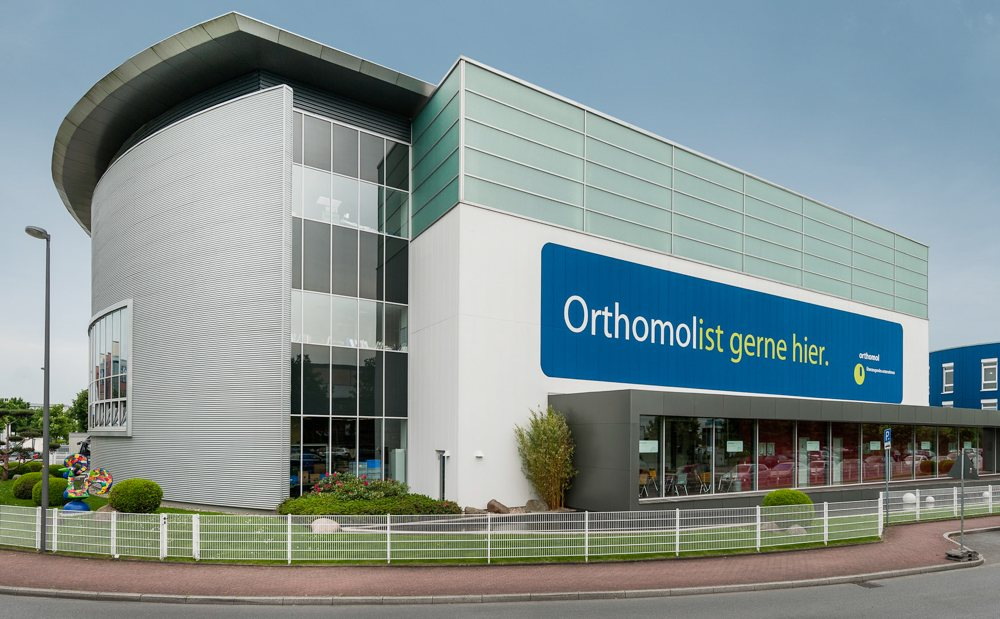
- Headquarters of Orthomol
- Type: Private Company (GmbH)
- Industry: Healthcare
- Founded: 1991; 35 years ago in Langenfeld, North Rhine-Westphalia, Germany
- Founder: Kristian Glagau
- Headquarters: Langenfeld, Germany
- Area served: Worldwide
- Key people: Nils Glagau; Michael Schmidt
- Products: over-the-counter micronutrient combinations (orthomolecular medicine)
- Revenue: ▲€153.57 million (2022)
- Number of employees: ▲495 (2022)
- Website: orthomol.com/en

Orthomol (full name: Orthomol pharmazeutische Vertriebs GmbH) is a family business based in Langenfeld, North Rhine-Westphalia, Germany. It was founded by Kristian Glagau in 1991 and is now managed by his son Nils together with Michael Schmidt. Orthomol is active in the production of over-the-counter micronutrient supplements. The company is market leader in Germany in the field of so-called orthomolecular medicine. The effect of such supplements is a controversial subject.

In the fiscal year 2022, Orthomol achieved a revenue of €153.57 million.

== History ==
=== Foundation and beginnings ===
In the late 1980s, Kristian Glagau, who had previously worked in marketing at Fresenius, developed the idea of distributing orthomolecular products in Germany after Nobel Prize winner Linus Pauling began using combined vitamin, mineral, and trace element formulation for disease prevention in the United States in 1968. In order to bring orthomolecular medicine to Germany and Europe, Glagau and Hans Dietl founded Orthomol in 1991.

=== Expansion ===
The company soon grew to about 100 employees. Alongside its activities in the German market, the company expanded in Europe, the United States, as well as the Middle East and Asia.

In 2009, the founder and Managing Director of Orthomol, Kristian Glagau, passed away. The company remained in family hands and was managed by Glagau's two children together with Michael Schmidt, who had already been Managing Director before Glagau's death. Although most aspects of the Orthomol business strategy remained unchanged, the product range was expanded.

In 2013, Orthomol acquired a recreational area near its headquarters in Langenfeld.

In 2014, Nils Glagau and Michael Schmidt remained as managers of the company. They increased the revenue in 2020 to nearly €130 million.

In 2019, Orthomol commenced the construction of a new production building covering an area of 7,000 square metres on the site acquired in 2013. At the end of 2022, the company began to expand the building by adding eight additional production lines over an area of more than 3,000 square metres.

=== Recent developments ===
In February 2024, Orthomol started the construction of a logistics centre in Leverkusen, which is intended to be used for the distribution and shipping of Orthomol products.

== Group structure ==
The parent company of the business is Orthomol Holding, a Gesellschaft mit beschränkter Haftung under German law. Its purpose includes the acquisition, establishment, sale, management, and holding of investments, as well as the management of companies involved in the production and distribution of pharmaceutical products. Orthomol Holding forms a corporate group with its German and international subsidiaries.

The managing directors are Nils Glagau (Marketing and Sales) and Michael Schmidt (Purchasing, Production, Logistics, and Technology). The ownership structure of the group consists of two separate families, those of the founders Nils Glagau and Gesche Hugger.

The group is often cited as an example of employer branding, particularly due to measures aimed at reconciling family and work life and the above-average support for trainees. Furthermore, company-owned fitness studios and sports halls have been established at the headquarters.

== Products ==
The product range of Orthomol includes indication-specific dietary supplements that address a wide spectrum of users. Orthomol offers granules, capsules, and drink bottles for patients with osteoarthritis, rheumatism, and tinnitus, as well as for pregnant women and athletes, along with products aimed at strengthening the immune system.

The company sells its products in over 30 countries.

== Public reception ==
In 2002, Der Spiegel criticized Orthomol for promoting products without any medical evidence related to cancer treatment. Der Tagesspiegel pointed out that dietary supplements primarily benefit manufacturers and cited the Arznei-Telegramm, which advised against orthomolecular medicine products.

According to Peter Sawicki in a 2014 Spiegel Online article, Orthomol Immun (Orthomol's best-known product) "has no proven effect on disease prevention, either as a single substance or in combination". In 2016, Deutsche Apothekerzeitung reported that over-the-counter immune stimulants, including Orthomol Immun Pro, were rated "insufficient" by the consumer magazine Öko-Test.

According to a survey conducted by SMR Social and Market Research Institute in Frankfurt among Orthomol users in 2011, 84% of consumers were convinced of the effectiveness of their Orthomol product. 47% reported taking Orthomol products on explicit recommendation from their doctor, while another 20% were prompted by their pharmacist's recommendation. In a 2018 survey involving 3,000 doctors, 96% expressed high to very high satisfaction with Orthomol Immun and Orthomol Vital. Additionally, 22% of doctors had integrated Orthomol Immun into their therapy recommendations for 15 to 25 years, while 17% had been recommending Orthomol Vital to their patients for the same duration.

== Sport sponsoring ==
Since 2016, Orthomol has been the supplier of dietary supplements for the German Ice Hockey Federation and the German national ice hockey teams. As part of this commitment, all DEB teams are provided with supplements from the Orthomol Sport range throughout the year.

In the 2017/18 season, the company served as the main sponsor of the second-division football club Fortuna Düsseldorf. Handelsblatt referred to it as a "coup" that brought significant attention to Orthomol. After the club's promotion to the Bundesliga, the collaboration was terminated; however, from 2019 to 2022, Orthomol was again a nutrition partner of the club. Additionally, the company is a nutrition partner of the German Tennis Federation (DTB) in the area of youth development. The partnership includes the year-round provision of Orthomol Sport products for selected players from the DTB squad, as well as the equipment of the DTB coaching staff. Additionally, the organization of anti-doping informational events is part of the partnership package.

Starting from the 2020/21 season, Orthomol was the main sponsor of second-division club Hamburger SV for two years, which included jersey advertising for the professional team. At the 2022 Basketball European Championship, Orthomol acted as an event sponsor.

The company also sponsored the newly-founded soccer league Baller League, which took place for the first time in January 2024. Since January 2024, Orthomol has been a nutrition partner of the Volleyball Bundesliga. Since summer 2024, it has been the jersey sponsor of Bayer Giants Leverkusen.

Together with presenter Laura Wontorra, Glagau leads the team of Wontorriors, a team in the small-field league The Icon League, organized by Toni Kroos and streamer Elias Nerlich.
