= Hannes Drews =

German football manager

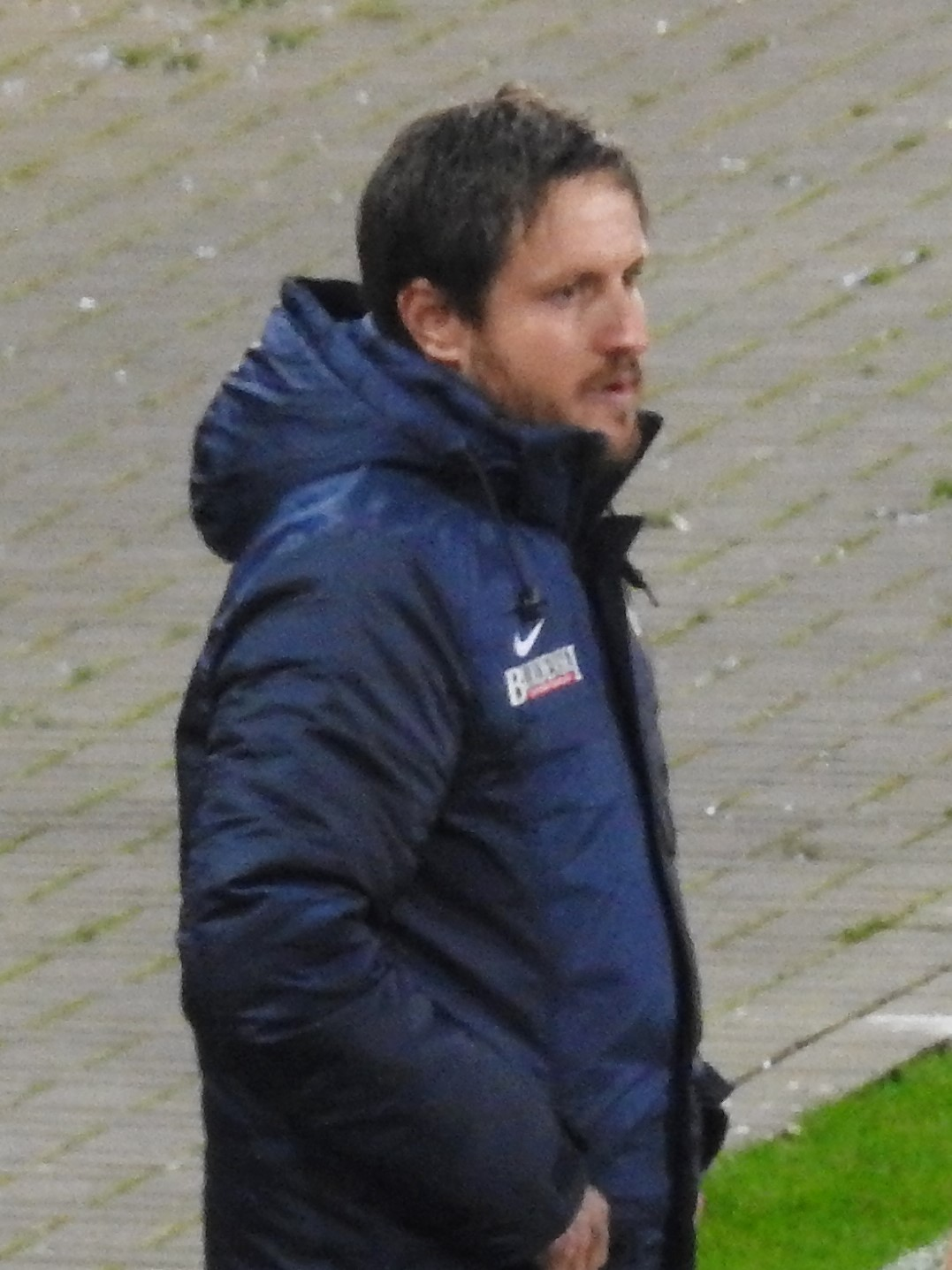
- Drews in 2017

Personal information
- Date of birth: 27 March 1982 (age 44)
- Place of birth: Neumünster, West Germany

Managerial career
- Years: Team
- 2010–2011: TuS Nortorf
- 2012-2016: Holstein Kiel U17
- 2016-2017: Holstein Kiel U19
- 2017–2018: Erzgebirge Aue
- 2019–2020: Hamburger SV II
- 2020–2021: Hamburger SV (assistant)
- 2022–2025: Werder Bremen (assistant)

Hannes Drews (born 27 March 1982) is a German football manager who works as assistant manager at Werder Bremen.

== Career ==
In January 2022, Drews became assistant manager to Ole Werner at Werder Bremen.
